= List of awards and nominations received by Claudine Barretto =

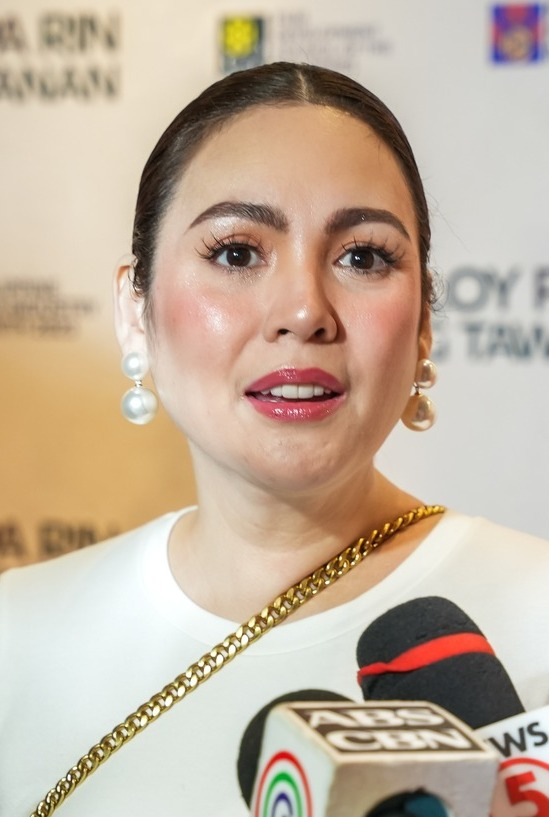
Barretto in 2023

Claudine Barretto is a Filipino actress who has received numerous accolades for her work in film and television, including three FAMAS Awards, a Luna Award, a Maria Clara Award, and two Box Office Entertainment Awards, including nominations for an Asian Television Award and three Gawad Urian Awards. In 2008, Barretto was inducted into the Eastwood City Walk of Fame.

Barretto began her career as a teenager in the youth-oriented variety show Ang TV (1992), for which she received the Star Award for Best New Television Personality. Her breakthrough came in the romantic drama Mula sa Puso (1997), for which she received the Parangal ng Bayan for Best Young Actress. For playing three identical characters in the romantic drama Saan Ka Man Naroroon (1999), Barretto received a nomination for an Asian Television Award for Best Actress and in 2000, she garnered a Luna Award nomination for Best Supporting Actress for her role in the drama Soltera. In 2002, she was awarded the German Moreno Youth Achievement Award at the FAMAS Awards.

Further critical and commercial success followed with her succeeding film and television roles in the 2000s. Barretto was awarded the Box Office Entertainment Award for Box Office Queen for the success of Got 2 Believe opposite Rico Yan and Kailangan Kita opposite Aga Muhlach. The latter earned her nominations for a FAMAS, Gawad Urian, Luna and Star Award for Best Actress. In 2004, she starred in the romantic drama Milan opposite Piolo Pascual where she won the FAMAS and Luna Award for Best Actress. The same year, Barretto played the titular role in the fantasy Marina, where she was nominated for a Star Award for Best Drama Actress.

Barretto next starred in the romantic thriller Nasaan Ka Man opposite Jericho Rosales and Diether Ocampo, for which she won the FAMAS and Star Award for Best Actress. The same year, she also starred in Dubai opposite Aga Muhlach and John Lloyd Cruz, where she won the Maria Clara Award for Best Actress. For the second time, she was awarded the Box Office Entertainment Award for Box Office Queen for Sukob (2006), which was the then-highest grossing Filipino film in history. She was also nominated for a Star Award for Best Drama Actress for each of her roles in soap operas in the succeeding years. These include Ikaw ang Lahat sa Akin (2005), Walang Kapalit (2007), and Iisa Pa Lamang (2008).

== Accolades ==
Awards and nominations received by Claudine Barretto
Organizations (Note: Awards, festivals, honors and other miscellaneous organizations are listed in alphabetical order.)	Year (Note: Indicates the year of ceremony. Each year is linked to the article about the awards held that year, wherever possible.)	Recipient(s)	Category	Result	Ref.
Asian Television Awards	1999	Saan Ka Man Naroroon	Best Television Actress	Nominated	
Box Office Entertainment Awards	2003	Got 2 Believe, Kailangan Kita	Box Office Queen	Won	
Box Office Entertainment Awards	2006	Sukob	Box Office Queen (Note: shared with Kris Aquino)	Won	
Cinema One Originals Digital Film Festival	2009	Claudine Barretto	Legend Award	Won	
FAMAS Awards	2002	Claudine Barretto	German Moreno Youth Achievement Award	Won	
FAMAS Awards	2003	Kailangan Kita	Best Actress	Nominated	
FAMAS Awards	2005	Milan	Best Actress	Won	
FAMAS Awards	2006	Nasaan Ka Man	Best Actress	Won	
FAMAS Awards	2007	Sukob	Best Actress	Nominated	
FAMAS Awards	2025	When Magic Hurts	Best Supporting Actress	Nominated	
Golden Screen Awards	2005	Ikaw Ang Lahat sa Akin	Outstanding Lead Actress in a Drama Series	Nominated	
Golden Screen Awards	2006	Dubai	Best Performance by an Actress in a Supporting Role (Drama, Musical or Comedy)	Nominated	
Gawad Pasado	2006	Nasaan Ka Man	Best Actress	Won	
Gawad Pasado	2007	Sukob	Best Actress	Nominated	
Gawad Pasado	2016	Etiquette for Mistresses	Highly Commended Group Performance (Note: shared with Kris Aquino, Iza Calzado, Kim Chiu, and Cheena Crab)	Won	
Gawad Urian	2003	Kailangan Kita	Best Actress	Nominated	
Gawad Urian	2005	Milan	Best Actress	Nominated	
Gawad Urian	2006	Nasaan Ka Man	Best Actress	Nominated	
Luna Awards	2000	Soltera	Best Supporting Actress	Nominated	
Luna Awards	2003	Kailangan Kita	Best Actress	Nominated	
Luna Awards	2005	Milan	Best Actress	Won	
Luna Awards	2006	Nasaan Ka Man	Best Actress	Nominated	
Luna Awards	2006	Dubai	Best Actress	Nominated	
Luna Awards	2011	In Your Eyes	Best Actress	Nominated	
Maria Clara Awards	2006	Dubai	Best Actress	Won	
Parangal ng Bayan	1999	Mula sa Puso	Best Young Actress	Won	
Star Awards for Movies	2003	Kailangan Kita	Movie Actress of the Year	Nominated	
Star Awards for Movies	2005	Milan	Movie Actress of the Year	Nominated	
Star Awards for Movies	2006	Nasaan Ka Man	Movie Actress of the Year	Won	
Star Awards for Movies	2022	Deception	Movie Actress of the Year	Nominated	
Star Awards for Movies	2023	Claudine Barretto	Female Star of the Night	Won	
Star Awards for Movies	2024	Mamasapano: Now It Can Be Told	Movie Supporting Actress of the Year	Nominated	
Star Awards for Television	1993	Ang TV	Best New Television Personality	Won	
Star Awards for Television	2003	ASAP Mania	Best Female Television Host	Won	
Star Awards for Television	2005	Marina	Best Drama Actress	Nominated	
Star Awards for Television	2006	Ikaw ang Lahat sa Akin	Best Drama Actress	Nominated	
Star Awards for Television	2007	Walang Kapalit	Best Drama Actress	Nominated	
Star Awards for Television	2009	Iisa Pa Lamang	Best Drama Actress	Nominated	
Star Awards for Television	2016	Maalaala Mo Kaya: Itak/Bolo	Best Single Performance by an Actress	Won	

== Other accolades ==
=== Listicles ===
Name of publisher, name of listicle, year(s) listed, and placement result
Publisher	Listicle	Year(s)	Ref(s).
Philippine Entertainment Portal	15 Greatest Movie Actresses in Leading Roles (2000–2020)	2021	
Yes! Magazine	100 Most Beautiful Stars	2010	
Yes! Magazine	Top 20 stars who ruled the decade (2000–2009)	2010	
