= Candy Pangilinan =

Filipino actress and comedian

- Born: Maria Carmela Espiritu Pangilinan; May 8, 1972 (age 54); Metro Manila, Philippines
- Occupations: Actress, comedian
- Years active: 1991–present
- Spouse: Gilbert Alvarado (separated)
- Children: 1
- Parent(s): Augusto Tongol Pangilinan (father); Teodorica Espiritu (mother)
- Relatives: Francis Pangilinan (first cousin)

Maria Carmela "Candy" Espiritu Pangilinan (born May 8, 1972) is a Filipino film and television actress and comedian. She won best actress for CineFilipino 2016 and Los Angeles International Film Festival for the movie Star na si Van Damme.

== Television and film career ==
In the early 1990s, she starred in supporting roles in romantic comedy films such as Hindi Magbabago with Carmina Villarroel in 1994 and in lead roles such as Dahil Ba sa Kanya in 1998. In 2007, she was cast in a comedy film Apat Dapat, Dapat Apat with friends and comedians Rufa Mae Quinto, Pokwang, Eugene Domingo, produced by Quinto with Viva Films and ON Q-28 Productions. In television, she is known for her role in the series Mula sa Puso until its finale in 1999 she then played side kick to Claudine Barretto's character Rosario in Saan Ka Man Naroroon in 1999 to 2001. I Love Betty La Fea from 2008 to 2009 with a follow-up on the Philippine remake of Only You with Angel Locsin, Sam Milby and Diether Ocampo on ABS-CBN and the Critically Acclaimed Series Minsan Lang Kita Iibigin in 2011, in 2012 she did supporting roles for GMA Network such as Forever with Heart Evangelista, Geoff Eigenmann and Gloria Romero, and Hiram na Puso with Gina Alajar and Kris Bernal, she then did notable guest appearances on the hit Saturday trivia-game show Celebrity Bluff alongside Eugene Domingo in 2013. In 2014, she guest starred on TV5 on Sharon, Kasama Mo Kapatid, Beki Boxer, Regal Shocker Presents, Showbiz Police, Face the People and Tropa Mo Ako Unli. In Wansapanataym, the revived TV series back in ABS-CBN in Perfecto and Noreen Capili's My App Boyfie.

== In popular culture ==
Pangilinan portrayed herself on the November 30, 2024, episode of Magpakailanman entitled "My Very Special Son: The Candy Pangilinan Story", featuring her life story.

== Personal life ==
Pangilinan was born to Dori Espiritu.

Pangilinan married at age 31 although she and her husband, Gilbert Alvarado, are currently separated. In 2003, she gave birth to a son, who has ADHD and autism.

In August 2024, Pangilinan had been in a 10-day isolation after having been diagnosed with herpes zoster.

== Filmography ==
=== Film ===
Year	Title	Role
1991	Shake, Rattle & Roll III	Sally
1993	Dahil Mahal Kita: The Dolzura Cortez Story	Nurse
1993	Johnny Tinoso and the Proud Beauty	
1994	Hindi Magbabago	Annette
1994	The Secrets of Sarah Jane: Sana’y Mapatawad Mo	Regina
1995	Isang Kahig, Tatlong Tuka (Daddy Ka Na, Mommy Ka Pa!)	
1995	Love Notes	Melody
1995	Romano Sagrado: Talim sa Dilim	Lourdes
1995	Ikaw Lang ang Mamahalin: Camiguin	
1995	Ikaw Pa, Eh Love Kita	TV analyst
1995	Boy! Gising!	
1995	Manalo Matalo, Mahal Kita	Bisay
1995	Isko: Adventures in Animasia	Carol
1996	Impakto	Melba
1996	April Boys: Sana'y Mahalin Mo Rin Ako	Chuchay
1996	Mahal Kita, Alam Mo Ba?	Gelli
1996	Isa, Dalawa, Takbo!	Wet Lady
1996	Medrano	Geneva
1997	Dahil Tanging Ikaw	Angel
1997	Rizal sa Dapitan	Maria
1997	Honey, Nasa Langit Na Ba Ako?	Noel's co-teacher
1998	Kung Ayaw Mo, Huwag Mo!	Cris
1998	Dahil Ba sa Kanya	Gina
1998	Sige, Subukan Mo	Sonia
1999	Mula sa Puso: The Movie	Berta
1999	Higit Pa sa Buhay Ko	Vangie
1999	Weder-Weder Lang 'Yan	Nikki
1999	Ikaw Lamang	Helena
2000	Eto Na Naman Ako	Silly
2000	Ayos Na... Ang Kasunod	Pilar
2002	Ikaw Lamang Hanggang Ngayon	Dina
2002	Akala Mo	Beauty
2003	Pakners	Ceiling
2006	D' Lucky Ones	Tita Cara
2006	Binibining K	Tess
2007	Apat Dapat, Dapat Apat: Friends 4 Lyf and Death	Maria Resurrection 'Res' Macabuhay
2007	Enteng Kabisote 4: Okay Ka, Fairy Ko... The Beginning of the Legend	Elsa
2008	For the First Time	Josie
2009	And I Love You So	Teacher Paula
2009	Ang Tanging Pamilya (A Marry-Go-Round!)	Ka Away
2010	Petrang Kabayo	Maita
2010	HIV: Si Heidi, Si Ivy at Si V	
2011	Who's That Girl?	Monique
2013	Ang Huling Henya	Peachy
2013	Momzillas	Gracia
2014	Wala Na Bang Ibang Title?	
2014	Mulat	Cathy
2014	Diary ng Panget	Mayordoma
2014	Talk Back and You're Dead	Selene Perez
2014	The Gifted	Mrs. Tabayoyong
2015	Wang Fam	Kay
2015	La Amigas	Veronica "Nica" Verallo-Bermudez
2015	Etiquette for Mistresses	Joy
2015	Everyday I Love You	Ninang Beth
2015	All You Need Is Pag-Ibig	Grace/Mel's Eldest Sister
2016	This Time	Mrs. Analyn Buhay
2016	Star Na si Van Damme Stallone	Nadia
2016	Lumayo Ka Nga sa Akin	Divina Tuazon
2016	Dukot	Police Chief dela Vega
2017	Deadma Walking	Martha
2018	Ang Pambansang Third Wheel	Maddie
2018	Ang Babaeng Allergic sa WiFi	Aries / Leo's Mom
2018	Nakalimutan ko nang kalimutan ka	Doc Rolex
2018	Abay Babes	Madam Astra
2019	Jowable	Nun
2019	Miracle in Cell No. 7	Orphanage rectress
2020	Hindi Tayo Pwede	Ramona
2021	Ang Babaeng Walang Pakiramdam	Tindera
2021	Tililing	Maricel
2021	Sa Haba ng Gabi	Neneng
2022	Partners in Crime	Giging Reynes
2023	Adik Sa'yo	Ida
2023	Sa Muli	Manang Susan
2023	The Cheating Game	Tita Gelly
2023	Penduko	Dayang Aurora
2024	Road Trip	Sophia
2024	Sunny	Dang
2026	A Werewolf Boy	Stella
2026	Wonderful Nightmare	Madam Chavez
2026	Love, Ngo	Queen

=== Television ===
Year	Title	Role
1994	Mixed N.U.T.S.	Herself
1996–1997	Good Evening... Pls.	Herself
1998–2004	Ispup	Herself
1998–1999	Mula sa Puso	Berta
1999–2001	Saan Ka Man Naroroon	Jengky
2001–2004	Whattamen	Bebeng
2002	Sa Dulo ng Walang Hanggan	Gundina
2008	I Love Betty La Fea	Catalina Dominguez With Bea Alonzo and John Lloyd Cruz
2009	Only You With Angel Locsin, Sam Milby, and Diether Ocampo	Chef Minnie
2010	Kokey @ Ako	Cynthia Caparas
2011	Minsan Lang Kita Iibigin	Mimi Estrella With Coco Martin, Maja Salvador, and Andi Eigenmann
2011	Daldalita	Daisy the duck
2011	P. S. I Love You	Lovely
2012	Gandang Gabi Vice	Herself
2012	Hiram na Puso	Becky
2013	Indio	Lupeng
2013	Forever	Susie
2013	The Gift	Dorina
2013	Wansapanataym Presents: Flores De Yayo	Mommy
2013	Celebrity Bluff	Player
2014	Wansapanataym Presents: Enchanted House	Cindy Dimasupil
2014	Beki Boxer	Consuelo Ponciano
2014	Wansapanataym Presents: Perfecto	Elaine
2015	Kapamilya, Deal or No Deal	Herself - Briefcase Number 8
2015	Celebrity Bluff	Guest player
2015	Karelasyon	Joan
2015	Marimar	Perfecta
2015	Sunday PINASaya	Guest
2016	Dear Uge	Laurie
2016	Hay, Bahay!	Chef Pangga
2016	Laff, Camera, Action!	Herself
2016	Magpakailanman:Sa Malas at Swerte	Rexy Soliman
2016	Celebrity Playtime	Player of Team 90's
2016	FPJ's Ang Probinsyano	Aida Bale
2017	Pinulot Ka Lang sa Lupa	Liza Marquez
2017	Wansapanataym: Annika Pintasera	Flora With Julia Montes and JC Santos
2017	The Lolas' Beautiful Show	Guest
2018	Precious Hearts Romances Presents: Araw Gabi	Emmy Reyes-Verano / Lupe Reyes
2018–2019	My Special Tatay	Chona Mariano
2019	Dragon Lady	Mimi
2020	Make It with You	Mariel Montenegro-Dimaguiba
2020	Bilangin ang Bituin sa Langit	Connie Herrera
2020	Fill in the Bank	Herself / Contestant
2021	Heartful Café	Madam Andi
2022	The Fake Life	Young Sonya
2022	Magpakailanman: Born to Be a Queen (The Edwin Luis Story)	Lily
2024	Da Pers Family	Marites
2024	Magpakailanman: My Very Special Son: The Candy Pangilinan Story	Herself
2025	It's Showtime	Herself
2025	7 Last Words	Testimony Sharer, Third Word
2025	Rainbow Rumble	Herself

== Awards and nominations ==
Awards and nominations
Year	Award giving body	Category	Nominated work	Results
2010	26th PMPC (Philippine Movie Press Club) Star Awards Star Awards	Digital Movie Original Theme Song Of The Year	Astig Ka	Included
2016	Cine Filipino Film Festival awards	Best Actress	Star na si Van Damme Stallone	Won
2016	Los Angeles International Film Festival Movie Star awards	Best Actress	Star na si Van Damme Stallone	Won
