= Soltera =

Soltera may refer to:

- Soltera (film), a 1999 Filipino film
- "Soltera" (Shakira song), 2024
- "Soltera" (Lunay, Chris Jeday and Gaby Music song), 2019
- "Soltera", a song by Maluma featuring Madonna from Maluma's 2019 album 11:11

== See also ==
- Subaru Solterra, an electric sport utility vehicle
