= Iisa Pa Lamang =

- Title card
- Also known as: My Only One
- Genre: Romance, Melodrama, Suspense
- Created by: ABS-CBN Studios
- Developed by: ABS-CBN Studios
- Directed by: Ruel S. Bayani; Manny Q. Palo
- Starring: Claudine Barretto; Angelica Panganiban; Diether Ocampo; Gabby Concepcion; Cherry Pie Picache; Susan Roces; Laurice Guillen; Joel Torre; Melissa Ricks; Matt Evans
- Opening theme: "Iisa Pa Lamang" by Lani Misalucha / Martin Nievera
- Composers: Jose Javier Reyes; Danny Tan
- Country of origin: Philippines
- Original language: Filipino
- No. of episodes: 85

Production
- Executive producers: Carlo Katigbak; Cory Vidanes; Laurenti Dyogi; Roldeo Endrinal
- Producer: Emerald Suarez
- Production locations: Metro Manila, Philippines; Nagcarlan, Laguna, Philippines
- Camera setup: Multi-camera setup
- Running time: 30-45 minutes
- Production company: Dreamscape Entertainment Television

Original release
- Network: ABS-CBN
- Release: July 14 – November 7, 2008

Iisa Pa Lamang (International title: My Only One / transl. Just One) is a 2008 Philippine television drama melodrama series broadcast by ABS-CBN. Directed by Ruel S. Bayani and Manny Q. Palo, it stars Claudine Barretto, Angelica Panganiban, Diether Ocampo, Gabby Concepcion, Cherry Pie Picache, Susan Roces, Laurice Guillen, Joel Torre, Melissa Ricks and Matt Evans. It aired on the network's Primetime Bida line up and worldwide on TFC from July 14 to November 7, 2008, replacing Lobo and was replaced by Pinoy Fear Factor.

The series is part of ABS-CBN International Sales, a line-up of Filipino telenovelas.

== Synopsis ==
The story revolves on a barrio lass Catherine Ramirez (Claudine Barretto), a young woman who has been deprived of everything. Due to her mother's death and her father's disappearance, she is concerned that one day someone will abandon her and she will end up like her parents. She grows up in the care of her grandmother Aurora (Susan Roces). The family is connected to the Castillejos, a family Aurora is a part of; she was born out of wedlock to the late Castillejo patriarch.

Their lives seem to be in an unlikely fate when Isadora (Cherry Pie Picache) the greedy new wife of Aurora's stepbrother, tries to take control of half of their property. Isadora has a son named Miguel. On the night of their arrival Miguel runs away after being horribly abused by his mother. Miguel runs into the barn; Catherine follows him and sees him crying. The young Rafael (AJ Perez) saves the two in from a fire. Catherine suddenly sees Rafael as a guardian while Miguel owes him his life, but is jealous. The young puppy love is cut short, but Catherine remembers the promise the three made that when the time comes they will all meet again.

Catherine grows into a beautiful woman. When Miguel (Diether Ocampo) comes home, a longing affection strikes them and draws an attraction. But beyond their happiest moments Rafael (Gabby Concepcion) comes home to visit the two. What Catherine does not know is that they returned just to see her and spend time with her. Miguel's ex-girlfriend Scarlet (Angelica Panganiban) comes home from abroad to disturb Miguel. Catherine and Miguel try to escape and get help from Rafael. Catherine is abducted, leaving them worried and speechless.

Three months pass and Catherine is trapped in a basement. She tries her best to run away and is saved by Louella from this heartache. She decides to regain her strength from the pain that this has caused her. Catherine, in the middle of hope and salvation, meets a rich old man Martin Dela Rhea (Bembol Roco). After finding important belongings and a load of cash at a park, he repays the offer by giving her a scholarship. She agrees and does well; leading her to a position and eventually, a proposal of marriage. Even though her grandmother opposes, she uses this as a way to fight off Isadora and Scarlet, who is revealed to be Martin's spoiled daughter and now Miguel's wife.

But how long will she be happy? How long will she suffer the consequences of her decision? Who will be the only one so far to love her? In the end, whom will she choose: Rafael or Miguel?

== Cast ==
=== Main cast ===
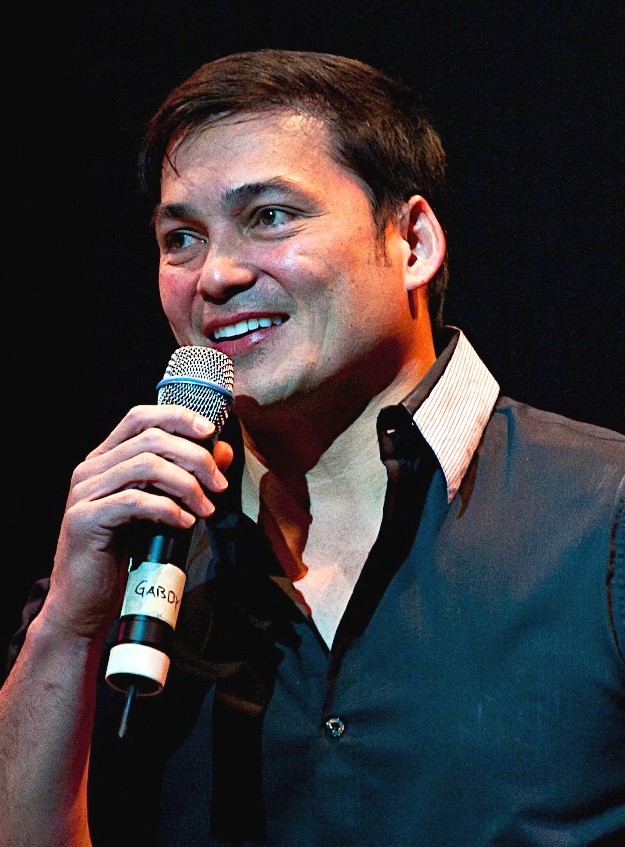
Gabby Concepcion plays Raphael Torralba, the leading man of Claudine Barretto, who portrays Catherine.

Cast	Character	Character Information
Claudine Barretto	Catherine Ramirez-Torralba / Catherine "Cate" Ramirez-Dela Rhea	She, Miguel, and Raphael met when they were children and vowed to meet again. When they were adults, Catherine and Miguel became lovers and decided to elope, with the help of Raphael. Unfortunately, Isadora, Miguel's mother, imprisons her in the Castillejos Memorial Hospital basement. When she is freed, it is revealed that Miguel has already married Scarlet Dela Rhea. Things become ever worse for Catherine as Isadora forcefully expels her, Louella, and Aura from their home. Catherine then vows to get revenge on all the people who hurt her. Later, she meets a rich old man named Martin Dela Rhea, who is Scarlet's father. They get married and when Martin died, she inherits his fortune. She uses this to fight off Estelle, Isadora, and Scarlet. Later she forgave everyone and married Raphael.
Gabby Concepcion	Atty. Cong. Raphael Torralba	Catherine's boyfriend and later husband. He, Miguel, and Catherine met when they were children and he becomes their "Kuya". During his adult years, he starts to develop and interest for Catherine and helps her and Miguel to elope together without their family's knowledge. After Catherine suffered from a miscarriage because of Isadora's schemes, he wanted to help her. Because of her anger, she refuses, but later Catherine accepts Raphael's help. Raphael and Miguel start to become rivals and start to break their friendship as they both want to win Catherine's heart. His mother, Estelle, refuses to accept Catherine and does several attempts to break off their love. In the end, he later marries Catherine and starts a family.
Diether Ocampo	Miguel Castillejos †	Isadora and Vernon's son and Scarlet's husband. He met Catherine and Raphael during their childhood days. In their adulthood, Miguel starts to develop feelings for Catherine and they decided to elope. Unfortunately, Catherine was abducted by Isadora's men. Isadora sent pictures to Miguel causing him to have a broken heart and decides to end all his connections with Catherine and marry Scarlet. Catherine then confronted Miguel and begs for him to believe her but he doesn't. Catherine then vows revenge against him. The world becomes smaller for the both of them as Cate Dela Rhea, the reformed Catherine Ramirez and now wife of Martin Dela Rhea, becomes his boss in the Dela Rhea Foods Incorporation. Once Catherine returns to his life, this causes ruffle between his and Scarlet's marriage. He later tries to win back Catherine by doing anything, but has to accept that she is already in the arms of another man - Raphael. Later on, he accepts Catherine and Raphael's union and decides to still be friends with them. Towards the end of the series, when Isadora made a mistake of him as Marco, she killed her own son, and Miguel dies.
Angelica Panganiban	Scarlet Dela Rhea-Castillejos	Miguel's ex-girlfriend and later wife. She is the spoiled bratty daughter of Martin Dela Rhea, and Scarlet despises her new stepmother, Catherine. Scarlet was caught kissing another man, as such Miguel decided to end their relationship. She and him later got married for financial reasons but had an unhappy marriage. Catherine and Scarlet get into several arguments and she calls her stepmother a gold digger in red and jail bird in orange. After Scarlet accused Catherine for killing her father Martin, she offers a reward of P5,000,000 to whoever finds Catherine. Isadora later brings Scarlet, Catherine and demands her "reward". Scarlet then started bleeding and Catherine brought her to the hospital. Because of what happened, Scarlet decides to forgive Catherine and helps her against Isadora. She and Catherine then become friends.

=== Supporting cast ===
Cast	Character	Character Information
Susan Roces†	Lola Aurora "Aura" Castillejos †	Catherine's loving grandmother. Took care of Catherine from a young age after she was abandoned by Rolando, her father because he blames himself for the death of Catherine's mother. Aura was born out-of-wedlock to the late Castillejos patriarch. She and Catherine start to suffer as Isadora, the greedy new wife of her half-brother decides to take control of half of their property. Things become even more complicated as they start to have hardships because of Isadora. Eventually, Aura is ready to fight back to Isadora along with Catherine, and takes back what is rightfully theirs after she proves that her half-brother is unable to sire children, Isadora is not legally a Castillejos, and Sofia is not a Castillejos. However, Aura is killed after a confrontation with Isadora as she pushes her and falls down the stairs to her death.
Laurice Guillen	Estelle Torralba†	Raphael and Toby's mother as well as Enrique's wife. When Raphael becomes romantically involved with Catherine, Estelle objects to this as her mind is manipulated by her "friend" Isadora. Cannot accept Catherine for her son as she believes that she'll hurt her son believing in what Isadora had told her. A loving wife, but becomes saddened after her husband, Enrique, suddenly dies in an ambush planned by Vernon, Isadora's ex-husband and lover. She later helps Aura get back her land from Isadora. One time, Isadora spilled wine on her clothes and Estelle let her borrow her handkerchief. But she was framed up by Isadora for the death of Aura when she put her handkerchief in Aura's hand; but was proven innocent. She overheard Vernon talking and she heard him say that Isadora was the one who killed Rolando. Afraid of what might happen, Isadora shot Estelle deadly and Catherine was framed up. Later she is proven innocent. Estelle then accepts Raphael to be with Catherine.
Cherry Pie Picache	Isadora Castillejos†	Miguel and Sofia's mother and Maggie's grandmother. Smart, clever, and quick thinking and at the same time greedy, merciless, pitiless especially to Catherine. Isadora is the greedy new wife of Victor Castillejos, Aurora's half-brother. She took control of half of their property and forcefully kicked out Aura, Louella, and Catherine. Catherine then vows revenge against her. Aura then gets back at Isadora by taking control back of their hacienda, and kicks Isadora out. Things become even worse for Isadora as it is revealed that Rolando is Sofia's biological father, meaning that she is not a Castillejos. Aura and Isadora have a confrontation in their house and Isadora accidentally pushes Aura as she falls to her death. Towards the end of the show, Isadora and Catherine confront each other and she admits everything - Vernon was the one who planned to assassinate Enrique; she was the one who killed Rolando; Isadora was the one who shot Estelle and framed up Catherine; and the most hurtful of all, she was the one who killed her Lola Aura. Isadora was later thought dead as she fell in quick sand after Catherine accidentally pushed her, but was saved by Vernon. In the finale, she asks for Miguel and Sofia's forgiveness and dies after she catches the grenade from Marco to protect Sofia and Miguel.
Matt Evans	Toby Torralba	Enrique and Estelle's son and Raphael's younger brother. He has an interest for Sofia, who is Isadora's daughter. Toby and Sofia go to the same school but are rivals in the beginning of the story. Eventually, the create a romance with each other despite their family issues. He was the one who informed Catherine that Sofia is her half-sister and Catherine saved her from the men she ordered to harm her. Toby later feels that nothing will happen because the police are moving slowly processing Enrique's case so her decides to take matters into his own hands. He confronts Vernon and Isadora, holding a gun at them. In the end, he marries Sofia.
Melissa Ricks	Sofia Castillejos-Torralba / Sofia Ramirez	Isadora and Rolando's daughter and Miguel and Catherine's younger half-sister. Sofia is feisty and hot-headed. Sofia was bossed around by her mother forcing her to ask Miguel money whenever she needs it. She knows nothing about her mother's true colors and tactics and schemes. Defends her mother against Catherine. She also confronts and argues with Catherine. Sofia starts to doubt if Victor Castillejos is her biological father. It is later revealed in the story that she is Rolando's daughter with Isadora. Catherine believed that Sofia killed Rolando, but after she was proven innocent Catherine, still full of anger, decides to do some schemes herself and has Sofia kidnapped. After finding out the truth, Catherine saves Sofia and asks for her forgiveness. Throughout the series, Sofia becomes romantically involved with Toby, Estelle's son and Raphael's younger brother. When she finds out of her mother's true colors and motives, she rebels against her and joins Catherine's side. In the end, she marries Toby.
Joel Torre	Rolando Ramirez†	Catherine and Sofia's father. Rolando left Catherine under the care of Aura after he felt guilty for his wife's death. With Catherine's mother deadly ill, he asks help from Isadora for help, but for a big price. He has to impregnate her. When his wife found out, she died; which causes him to disappear. Later, he returns to Catherine and Sofia's life hoping to make their family complete once again. He gave Catherine and Sofia matching bracelets to give them a clue to find each other. When Sofia and Catherine find each other they immediately love and accept each other and read the late Rolando's letter. Vernon wanted to kill Rolando as he was the only witness of the men who assassinated Enrique Torralba. Vernon's men failed and Isadora killed him by injecting morphine into his body. Sofia was blamed for his death but was later proven not liable.
Kitkat	Louella	Catherine's best friend. Louella was a janitor at the Castillejos Memorial Hospital where Catherine was being detained by Isadora, illegally, in the basement, She saves Catherine from Isadora's hands and helps her escape. She and Catherine become lifelong friends and she helps Aura and her with their family problems. She then lives with Aura and Catherine and befriends them. Louella also despises Isadora and Scarlet.
Bembol Roco	Martin Dela Rhea†	Scarlet's father and Catherine's deceased husband. He met Catherine and decided to call her "Cate". Martin was the one who gave Catherine the scholarship to help her study and they become good friends. Until Martin realizes that he loves Cate and proposes to her, despite their big age differences - 26-year-old woman and a 57-year-old man. Despite that, Martin loves and protects Cate from all of Scarlet's schemes. Later he dies after he got into an accident. Catherine was blamed for his death and the testimony was by Scarlet. In the end, Martin later gave Cate the Dela Rhea Food Corporations, but Cate gave it to Scarlet as now that they are in good terms.
Jaime Fabregas	Cong. Enrique Torralba†	Toby and Raphael's father and Estelle's late husband. A good father, but focuses on his ambition on politics and even uses his own son, Raphael, since he's an attorney to get him out of his scandals. During the election, Vernon planned to assassinate him and it was successful as he died. In the aftermath of his death, Estelle becomes depressed and the Torralba family starts to break. Toby, his youngest son, will not stop until he seeks justice for what happened to Enrique. In the end of the series, Isadora admits to Catherine that Vernon was the mastermind of assassinating him.
Jestoni Alarcon	Vernon Fuentes	Miguel's biological father and Isadora's ex-husband. Vernon went to work abroad for Miguel and Isadora. But since Isadora was a selfish woman and only thought about herself, she decided to leave him for a better life and married a rich haciendero, named Victor Castillejos. Even though this happened, Vernon still loves Isadora and is her accomplice in her schemes against her enemies. In order for Miguel to win the election, Vernon ordered his men to assassinate Enrique Torralba. When Isadora was trying to win back the land from Aura, she wanted Vernon to lie that he left her and Miguel. But Vernon didn't agree to that bargain because it was a lie because Isadora was the one who left him for Victor. Later, he owns up for his wrongdoings and was put to jail for life imprisonment.
Daniel Fernando	Marco Selveste†	Towards the end of series, as Scarlet became even more desperate to find Catherine, she meets Marco. And orders him to hunt down Catherine. Unfortunately, when he saw Catherine and Miguel, when Miguel took Catherine with him. He got shot. Later on, Scarlet went on live TV and told everyone in the whole Philippines about the reward which is P5,000,000. He then thinks that he has a right with the reward money as Catherine has a big debt on him. Marco and Isadora then become enemies to find Catherine. In the end, Isadora thought that Marco was Miguel and shot her own son. After Isadora begged for Sofia and Miguel's forgiveness, Marco tried to shoot Isadora but Miguel shot him first. But Marco didn't stop and threw a grenade to kill Isadora.

=== Guest cast ===
- Frances Makil-Ignacio as Winnie "Tita Winnie" Ignacio: One of Scarlet's employees and friend.
- Martin del Rosario as Eric Suarez: Toby's friend.
- Reb Sibal as Jonas
- Beauty Gonzalez as Jenna: Sofia's best friend
- Cheska Garcia as Tracy
- Angel Aquino as young Isadora
- Aldred Gatchalian
- Neil Ryan Sese as Atty. Sanchez†
- Jefrrey Hidalgo: A woman Isadora hired to pose with Catherine, naked, hoping to destroy Miguel and Catherine's relationship by sending pictures. The former succeeds and their relationship is ruined.
- Soliman Cruz
- Jeoff Monzon
- Gigi Locsin as Edith
- AJ Perez† as young Rafael Torralba: Young Raphael saved Catherine and Miguel as becomes their "Kuya".
- Chinggoy Alonzo† as Victor Castillejos†: The late head of the Castillejos' clan and Aura's cousin.
- Angelo Patrimonio
- Mika dela Cruz as young Sofia Castillejos / Sofia Ramirez
- Gemmae Custodio as young Catherine Ramirez
- Bing Pimentel as Anna Castillejo-Ramirez†: Catherine's deceased mother and Rolando's wife.
- John Suarez as young Miguel Castillejos: After being abused greatly by his mother, Isadora Castillejos, Miguel decided to run away and he meets Catherine and Raphael. Little did he know that they would be in a love triangle in their adult years.

== Trivia ==
This was the last soap opera appearance of Claudine Barretto before moving to GMA Network in 2009. She also reunited with Diether Ocampo for the last time after 11 years since Mula sa Puso in 1997, Saan Ka Man Naroroon in 1999 and Ikaw ang Lahat sa Akin in 2005.

== Reruns ==
The show began airing re-runs on Jeepney TV from January 6 to April 10, 2014; November 17, 2014 to March 13, 2015; May 27 to August 9, 2019; August 23 to October 15, 2021; November 25, 2024 to January 24, 2025; and May 4 to August 21, 2026.

== International broadcast ==
Country/Region
Vietnam

== See also ==
- List of programs broadcast by ABS-CBN
- List of ABS-CBN Studios original drama series
- List of programs broadcast by Jeepney TV
