= Maligno =

Maligno may refer to:

- Maligno, a 1977 film by Celso Ad. Castillo
- Maligno (TV series), a Philippine television drama horror series aired on ABS-CBN
