= Kailangan Kita =

- Official movie poster
- Directed by: Rory B. Quintos
- Screenplay by: Shaira Mella Salvador; Moira Lang (Note: Credited as Raymond Lee; Lee became Moira Lang in 2013.)
- Story by: Shaira Mella Salvador; Moira Lang; Emman dela Cruz
- Produced by: Charo Santos-Concio; Malou N. Santos
- Starring: Aga Muhlach; Claudine Barretto
- Cinematography: Shayne Sarte Clemente
- Edited by: Marya Ignacio
- Music by: Jessie Lasaten
- Production company: Star Cinema
- Distributed by: ABS-CBN Film Productions
- Release date: November 6, 2002
- Country: Philippines
- Language: Filipino
- Box office: ₱100,000,756.00

Kailangan Kita (lit. 'I Need You') is a 2002 Filipino romantic drama film directed by Rory B. Quintos and written by Shaira Mella Salvador and Moira Lang, from a story by Salvador, Lang, and Emman dela Cruz. Set in the province of Albay, it stars Claudine Barretto who plays Lena, a simple lady in the province, and Aga Muhlach as Carl, a Filipino working in the United States who visited Albay to fix his wedding with Lena's elder sister.

Produced and distributed by ABS-CBN Film Productions, the film was theatrically released on November 6, 2002. This is the first film to feature Claudine Barretto without her on-screen partner Rico Yan, who died eight months earlier, as Claudine remained in Sa Dulo ng Walang Hanggan.

== Synopsis ==
New York-based celebrity chef Carl Diesta is coming home to the Philippines after being away for seventeen long years to marry his fiancée, supermodel Chrissy Duran, in her hometown of Albay province. With Chrissy still being held up somewhere in Europe for a photo shoot, Carl has to meet her family by himself and instantly impresses everyone except for Chrissy's father, 'Papay' Rogelio. Here, Carl gets to meet Chrissy's other sister - Lena. Through Lena, Carl has now come to terms with his forcibly forgotten identity - both as a son and as a Filipino. Lena has also awakened a love in Carl that he has never felt before.

== Cast ==
- Aga Muhlach as Carl "Caloy" Diesta
- Claudine Barretto as Elena "Lena" Duran
- Jericho Rosales as Abel
- Johnny Delgado as Rogelio Duran
- Liza Lorena as Consuelo Duran
- Dante Rivero as Ka Pinong (Carl's Father)
- Cris Villanueva as Father Ruben
- Gerald Madrid as Mario
- Rissa Mananquil-Samson as Crissy Duran
- Ces Quesada as Lucci Dellosa
- Igi Boy Flores as Buboy Duran
- Farrah Florer as Sylvia
- Mads Nicolas as Elvie Mirandilla
- Cholo Escaño as Sonny Duran
- Nicole Judalena as Giselle Duran
- Idda Yaneza as Martha
- Cyrus Balingit as Henry

== Music ==
- Sa Kabukiran - Freddie Aguilar
- Kailangan Kita - Gary Valenciano
