= Bakit Manipis ang Ulap? =

2016 Philippine television drama series

- Title card
- Genre: Romance; Melodrama
- Created by: Viva Communications
- Based on: Bakit Manipis ang Ulap by Danny Zialcita
- Directed by: Joel Lamangan
- Starring: Claudine Barretto; Diether Ocampo; Cesar Montano; Meg Imperial
- Theme music composer: Willy Cruz
- Opening theme: "Kahit Na" by Anja Aguilar
- Country of origin: Philippines
- Original language: Tagalog
- No. of episodes: 48

Production
- Production locations: Quezon City, Philippines
- Camera setup: Multiple-Camera Setup
- Running time: 30–45 minutes

Original release
- Network: TV5
- Release: February 15 – April 22, 2016

Related
- Habang Kapiling Ka (GMA) (2002-2003)

Bakit Manipis ang Ulap? (lit. 'Why are the Clouds Thin?') is a 2016 Philippine television drama series broadcast by TV5. The series is based on the 1985 Philippine film of the same title. Directed by Joel Lamangan. It stars Claudine Barretto, Diether Ocampo, Cesar Montano and Meg Imperial. It aired from February 15 to April 22, 2016, replacing Movie Max 5 and was replaced by the second season of Arrow

The story revolves around Marla, a woman who falls victim of an illicit affair with Miguel. She is also the love of George's life. George has been a good friend, but Marla has always loved Miguel even since college. Later on, Miguel marries Katrina to keep the family business from afloat. Marla falls in love with a new suitor, Ricardo, a rich businessman. Problems escalate when Marla becomes the stepmother of Alex, whom she met several times.

== Rerun ==
The series was re-aired on TV5 from April 10 to June 16, 2023 on Hapon Champion afternoon block at 3:00 PM replacing the rerun of Sa Ngalan ng Ina and was replaced by the rerun of For Love or Money.

== Cast ==
=== Main cast ===
- Claudine Barretto as Marla Alvarez
- Diether Ocampo as George Bustamante
- Cesar Montano as Ricardo Villafuerte
- Meg Imperial as Alexandra "Alex" Villafuerte

=== Supporting cast ===
- Carmina Manzano as Leticia Maximilliano
- Bernard Palanca as Miguel "Migs" Custodio
- Mariel de Leon as Rhona Custodio
- Dindi Gallardo as Serena Almodal
- Ruffa Gutierrez as Vera Strong
- Roxanne Barcelo as Katrina Alarcon
- Samantha Lopez as Digna Herrera
- Janelle Jamer as Bernadette De Jesus
- Bret Jackson as Pax Almodal
- Maxel Flores - now, Max Corpuz as Rydel
- Issa Pressman as Rowena
- Jay Manalo as Roberto

== See also ==
- List of TV5 (Philippine TV network) original programming
