= Only You (2009 TV series) =

- Title card
- Genre: Drama; Romantic comedy
- Created by: ABS-CBN Studios; SBS (South Korea)
- Based on: Only You by Hwang Sung Yeon
- Written by: Henry King Quitain; Denise O' Hara; Arden Rod Condez; Pam Miras
- Directed by: Rory B. Quintos
- Starring: Angel Locsin; Diether Ocampo; Sam Milby
- Opening theme: "Only You" by Sam Milby
- Country of origin: Philippines
- Original language: Filipino
- No. of episodes: 85

Production
- Executive producers: Carlo Katigbak; Cory Vidanes; Laurenti Dyogi; Malou Santos; Ginny Monteagudo-Ocampo
- Producers: Sackey Prince Pendatun; Myleen Ongkiko
- Production locations: Metro Manila, Philippines; South Korea
- Editors: Ariel Pascual; Dennis Salgado; Joy Buenaventura
- Running time: 30-45 minutes
- Production company: Star Creatives

Original release
- Network: ABS-CBN
- Release: April 27 – August 21, 2009

Only You is a 2009 Philippine television drama broadcast by ABS-CBN. The series is based on the 2005 South Korean drama series of the same title. Directed by Rory B. Quintos, it stars Angel Locsin, Diether Ocampo and Sam Milby. It aired on the network's Primetime Bida line 8p and worldwide on TFC from April 27 to August 21, 2009, replacing I Love Betty La Fea and was replaced by Dahil May Isang Ikaw.

== Synopsis ==
Despite her mother's protests, Jillian pursues her dream of becoming a chef by joining a cooking contest where she gets a chance to study culinary arts in different Asian countries. Before anyone can stop her, she is already on her way to South Korea with her long-time best friend, Jonathan. But it soon becomes clear to her that skill alone is not enough to make her pass such a difficult course. So in her desperate attempt to succeed and create a good life for her family, she goes in search for a woman who can teach her a winning recipe.

She crosses paths with TJ, an arrogant, wealthy businessman who is looking for his mother, the same woman Jillian is looking for. They hardly get along yet they eventually end up having a one-night stand as Jillian momentarily makes him forget about his worries about his mother's second marriage. They go their separate ways the next morning after a misunderstanding. Later on, Jillian learns that she is pregnant, which means that she cannot continue her studies. A twist of fate brings them together again in the Philippines, six years after their fateful encounter abroad.

== Cast and characters ==
=== Main cast ===
- Angel Locsin as Jillian Mendoza
- Diether Ocampo as Jonathan Sembrano
- Sam Milby as Theodore "TJ" Javier, Jr.

=== Supporting cast ===
- Tirso Cruz III as Theodore "Teddy" Javier, Sr.
- Iya Villania as Trixie Gonzales
- Dimples Romana as Dina Javier
- Bing Pimentel as Erika Javier
- Al Tantay as Fernando "Nanding" Mendoza / Ramon
- Dick Israel as Rodolfo "Rod" Sembrano / Elvis
- Irma Adlawan as Corazon "Cora" Mendoza
- Candy Pangilinan as Chef Minnie
- Ella Cruz as Andrea Mendoza
- Elijah Magundayao as Joshua Javier

=== Guest cast ===
- Angel Sy as young Jillian
- Francis Magundayao as young Jonathan
- Jacob Rica as young TJ
- Hennesy Lee as young Trixie
- Ian Galliguez as China
- Carla Humphries as Agnes Aguirre
- Justin Cuyugan as Vince Lapuz III
- Franzen Fajardo as Aji
- Gabe Mercado as Boyet Marcos
- Jose Sarasola as George
- JC Cuadrado as Derek

== Production ==
Only You had its first cast look test pictorial on February 17, 2009, with Angel Locsin, Diether Ocampo and Sam Milby. Principal photography began in late March 2009 in Seoul, South Korea with Locsin, Ocampo and Milby alongside Iya Villania and Dimples Romana. Filming for the series concluded in the Philippines on August 14, 2009.

== Reception ==
Only You debuted with a 39.2% nationwide rating based on Kantar Media/TNS National Households TV Audience Measurement. The finale episode registered a nationwide average of 39.8% in the TV Ratings based on Kantar Media/TNS National Households data.

== See also ==
- List of programs broadcast by ABS-CBN
- List of ABS-CBN Studios original drama series
