= Juan Rodrigo =

Filipino actor, model and singer (1961)

- Born: José Dante P. Pascual; August 22, 1952 (age 74); Philippines
- Occupations: Actor, singer, model, dancer, recording artist, chemist
- Years active: 1979–present

José Dante P. Pascual, known professionally as Juan Rodrigo, is a Filipino stage, film and television actor, singer and model. He is considered the father of the Filipino soap opera.

== Personal life and career ==
Rodrigo was discovered by his former talent manager Boy De Guia. He started as a dancer, became a Karilagan model and stage actor, then became a film actor. He is the first actor that was launched in the telenovelas like Mara Clara and Mula sa Puso. Rodrigo did films with Nora Aunor like Annie Batungbakal (1979), Bongga Ka Day (1980), and Ang Totoong Buhay ni Pacita M. (1992), among others. He also appeared in movies such as Kisapmata (1981) with Charo Santos, Haplos (1982) with Vilma Santos, Ang Babaeng Nawawala Sa Sarili (1989) with Dina Bonnevie, Hindi Palulupig (1989) starring Lito Lapid, Bawal Na Gamot with Romnick Sarmenta, and Mga Batang Bangketa (2006) with Camille Prats. He received an award of FAMAS Best Supporting Actor 1982 for the movie Moral and 2nd PMPC Star Awards for Television Best Drama Actor for RPN 9's Banyuhay.

In 1988, Rodrigo was cast in two action films titled Dugo sa Bawat Punglo and Kumander Nelson.

Rodrigo studied BS Chemistry, at Far Eastern University. He used to be a laboratory analyst for quality control at the Philippine Refining Company, now Unilever.

== Filmography ==
=== Film ===
- Annie Batungbakal (1979)
- Aliw (1979)
- Pader at Rehas (1980)
- Palawan (1980)
- Esmeralda at Ruby (1980)
- Bongga Ka Day (1980)
- Taga sa Panahon (1980)
- Tondo Girl (1981)
- Caught in the Act (1981)
- Kisapmata (1981) – Ernie
- Rock N' Roll (1981)
- Schoolgirls (1982)
- Haplos (1982)
- Moral (1982) – Robert
- Gabi Kung Sumikat ang Araw (1983)
- Bago Kumalat ang Kamandag (1983)
- Apoy sa Inyong Kandungan (1984)
- Sampung Ahas ni Eva (1984)
- Lihim sa Likod ng Buwan (1985)
- Ulo ng Gang-ho (1985)
- God Save Me! (1985)
- Moises Padilla Story: The Missing Chapter (1985)
- Urban Terrorist (1988)
- Hindi Palulupig (1989)
- Ipaglalaban Ko (1989)
- Dear Diary (1989)
- Ang Babaeng Nawawala sa Sarili (1989)
- Pangarap Na Ginto (1990)
- Lumaban Ka... Sagot Kita (1990)
- Andrea, Paano Ba ang Maging Isang Ina? (1990) – Momoy
- Dalawa Man ang Buhay Mo, Pagsasabayin Ko (1991) – Ruben
- Anak ng Cabron: Ikalawang Ugat (1991)
- Ang Totoong Buhay ni Pacita M. (1992) – Raul
- Canary Brothers of Tondo (1992)
- Secret Love (1993)
- Tikboy Tikas at Mga Khroaks Boys (1993)
- Gaano Kita Kamahal (1993) Boy Suclad
- Secret Love (1994) – Romy
- Bawal Na Gamot (1994) – Tony
- Mara Clara: The Movie (1996)
- Wag na Wag Kang Lalayo (1996) – Mike
- Ako Ba ang Nasa Puso Mo? (1997)
- Matrikula (1997)
- Mula sa Puso: The Movie (1999)
- Kiss Mo 'Ko (1999)
- Biktima: Campus Coed (2003)
- Mga Batang Bangketa (2006)
- Eternity (2006)
- Green Paradise (2007)
- Iisang Lahi: Pearl of the Orient Seas (2008)
- Ang Sugo sa Huling Araw (not specific)
- Four Sisters and a Wedding (2013) – Caloy Salazar (voice and photo appearances only)
- Lorna (2014)
- Ex with Benefits (2015) – Father of Scarlet
- Upline Downline (2015)
- Mamasapano: Now It Can Be Told (2022) – Secretary Mar Roxas
- Voltes V: Legacy – The Cinematic Experience – Dr. Baden
- Kuya: The Governor Edwin Jubahib Story (upcoming)
- Kid Alpha One (upcoming)
- Romano (2026)

=== Theatre ===
- Mirandolina (1982)
- Lorenzo Ruiz (1989)

=== Television / Digital Series ===
Year	Title	Role	Ref.		
1992–97	Mara Clara	Amanthe del Valle (Note: Rodrigo was the original actor who portrayed the character, in the original TV series.)			
1997–99	Mula sa Puso	Don Fernando Pereira (Note: Rodrigo was the original actor who played the character, Don Fernando Pereira, during the original television series.)			
1999–01	Saan Ka Man Naroroon	Dominador "Domeng" Javier			
2000–02	Pangako Sa 'Yo	Fr. Crispin Arenas			
2002–03	Sa Dulo ng Walang Hanggan	Efren Wilwayco			
2004	Mangarap Ka	Mike			
2004–05	Forever in My Heart	Roberto Bernabe			
2005–06	Now and Forever: Agos	Ricardo			
2006	Gulong ng Palad	Juancho			
2006	Your Song	Andrea's father (Episode: "I've Fallen In Love")			
2006	Komiks Presents: Da Adventures of Pedro Penduko	Kiko			
2006	Love Spell	Nikki's father (Episode: "Line To Heaven")			
2007	Mga Kwento ni Lola Basyang	Sultan (Episode: "Akong Ikit")			
2007	Ysabella	Fernando Montalban			
2007	Maalaala Mo Kaya	Dr. Sanchez (Episode: "Pilat")			
2008	Sine Novela: Maging Akin Ka Lamang	Don Augusto Monteverde			
2008	Babangon Ako't Dudurugin Kita	Arturo Salcedo			
2009	Sine Novela: Dapat Ka Bang Mahalin?	Rene Ramos			
2010	May Bukas Pa	Libay's father			
2010	Rubi	Genaro Ferrer			
2010	Beauty Queen	Virigilio Rivas			
2010	Pepito Manaloto	Erika's father			
2011–12	Amaya	Datu Pulujan			
2012	Broken Vow	Mayor Lucio Sebastian			
2012	Maalaala Mo Kaya	Inggoy (Episode: "Lubid")			
2012	Maalaala Mo Kaya	Merly's father (Episode: "Apoy")			
2012	Precious Hearts Romances Presents: Paraiso	Rodolfo Galang			
2013	Maalaala Mo Kaya	Emong (Episode: "Gown")			
2013	Anna Karenina	Don Xernan Monteclaro (Note: Rodrigo plays the remake version of the character, Xernan Monteclaro.)			
2013	Genesis	Dr. Lazon			
2014	Innamorata	Don Leonardo Padilla			
2014	Kambal Sirena	Manolo Montero			
2014	Dading	Don Romeo Rodriguez			
2014	Ang Lihim ni Annasandra	Jojo Salvador			
2015	Ipaglaban Mo!	Dario (Episode: "Nasa Maling Landas")			
2015	FlordeLiza	Mariano "Nano" Perez			
2015	Maynila	Rodrigo Duterte (Episode: "Signs of Love")			
2016	Wish I May	Edward Pizarro			
2016	FPJ's Ang Probinsyano	Romeo "Romy" Maglipon			
2016	Maalaala Mo Kaya	Ismael (Episode: "Salamin")			
2017	Trops	Kevin Mercado			
2017	Mulawin vs. Ravena	Lumbas			
2017	Wildflower	Ramon Montoya			
2017	Kambal, Karibal	Tomas Magpantay			
2017	Stories for the Soul	Jess (Episode: "Alibughang Anak")			
2018	Cain at Abel	Oscar Evangelista			
2019	Sahaya	Bapa			
2019	Beautiful Justice	Pocholo Cuevas			
2021	Legal Wives	Cesar San Luis			
2022–23	Maria Clara at Ibarra	Santiago "Kapitan Tiago" Delos Santos			
2023	Voltes V: Legacy	Dr. Baden			
2023	Maging Sino Ka Man	Miguelito "Miguel" Arnaiz			
2023	Pinoy Crime Stories	Ricky Dasco (Episode: "Notoryus")			
2024	My Guardian Alien				
2025	Batang Quiapo	Alfredo Pangan†		2026	Sigabo

== Discography ==
- It's About Time (Album)
- Pangako
- Walang Kasing Sarap
- Close To Forever
- Kabayan Huwag Kang Mag-alala
