= Claudine Barretto =

Filipino actress (born 1979)

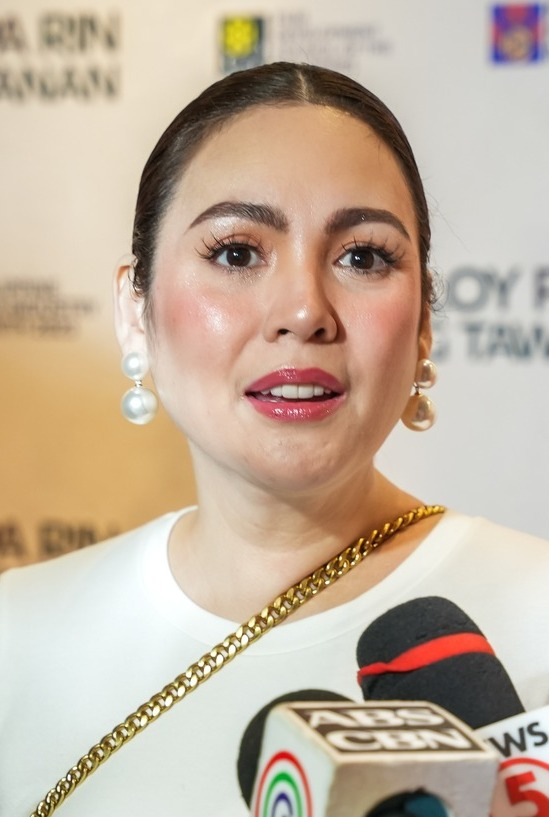
- Barretto in 2023
- Born: Claudine Margaret Castelo Barretto; July 20, 1979 (age 47); Manila, Philippines
- Occupation: Actress
- Years active: 1992–present
- Spouse: Raymart Santiago (m. 2006; ann. 2013)
- Partners: Rico Yan (1998–2002)
- Children: 4
- Relatives: Gretchen Barretto (sister); Marjorie Barretto (sister); Julia Barretto (niece); Júnior (uncle); Shaila Dúrcal (cousin); Alberto Barretto (great-granduncle)
- Awards: Full list

Claudine Margaret Castelo Barretto (Tagalog: [klaʊˈdin baˈrɛto]; born July 20, 1979) is a Filipino actress. A recipient of four PMPC Star Awards for Television, two FAMAS Awards, and a Maria Clara Award, she made her screen debut as a teenager on the youth-oriented variety show, Ang TV (1992–1996). Barretto later became a mainstay in several sitcoms, including Home Along Da Riles (1992–1997 and Oki Doki Doc (1993–1998) and a string of soap operas including Mula sa Puso (1997), Saan Ka Man Naroroon (1999), Marina (2004) and Iisa Pa Lamang (2008).

Her reign as “Teleserye Queen” was very important to the Primetime television culture in the late 90s and late 2000’s her telenovelas were also shown on cable television. Via (Studio 23) and Cinema One, Pinoy Central (International channel) and TFC where she achieved more success. In 2010 she did her first Drama anthology for GMA TV Network named “Claudine” . In 2016 she did a short lived Television series “Bakit Manipis Ang Ulap?” Which reaired in 2020 and 2023. In 2024 she played a very important role in GMA Networks Lovers and Liars a remake of Jose Javier Reyes film “Bayarang Puso”.

== Career ==
=== Early work: ABS-CBN (1992–1997) ===
Barretto was discovered by talent manager Douglas Quijano in 1992 through older sister, Gretchen Barretto, also an actress. That same year, she landed her first major role on television when she was cast for ABS-CBN's youth-oriented variety show, Ang TV.

In 1993, she starred at television series Home Along Da Riles with Dolphy which further introduced her to local media. She also appeared in television shows like Oki Doki Doc (1993–2000), Palibhasa Lalake (1993–1998) and movie May Minamahal (1993). She also made a three times appearance on Maalaala Mo Kaya.

At the same time, Barretto made 2 already film with Star Cinema as she started on showbiz industry

In 1994, she became part of a Star Cinema's film Lagalag: The Eddie Fernandez Story.

In 1995, she starred in Mangarap Ka, her first major film role with Mark Anthony Fernandez and Pare Ko.

In 1996, she was better known on the various film of Star Cinema which includes, Radio Romance, her first film with Rico Yan, Oki Doki Doc: The Movie and Madrasta with Christopher de Leon and Sharon Cuneta. She also appeared again two times in Maalaala Mo Kaya.

=== Breakthrough (1997–2002) ===
Barretto landed her first ever television drama series in 1997 titled Mula sa Puso that made her recognize of many on her outstanding performance as an young actress. The series ran for three consecutive years on ABS-CBN. That same year she starred in films like Home Along Da Riles 2 with Dolphy, Calvento Files: The Movie with Rio Locsin and Diether Ocampo, and F.L.A.M.E.S.: The Movie with Rico Yan, Paula Peralejo, and Boots Anson-Roa.

In 1998, she portrayed Mela in the film Dahil Mahal na Mahal Kita which was directed by Wenn V. Deramas, alongside Rico Yan and Diether Ocampo.

Later in 1999, with the debut of the soap opera Saan Ka Man Naroroon where she portrayed as triplets in the name of Rosario, Rosenda and Rosemarie which earned her a nomination for Best Actress in the Asian TV Awards. Also the same year she starred in films like Soltera with Diether Ocampo and Maricel Soriano, and the film adaptation of Mula sa Puso. She also appeared in Wansapanataym for the first time where she also portray three different roles before her second soap opera.

She also co-starred Vilma Santos in the highly commended 2000 movie Anak directed by Rory Quintos.

In 2001, she was cast as the lead role in the drama series Sa Dulo ng Walang Hanggan (2001–2003) with Carlos Agassi, Luis Alandy, and Mylene Dizon and film Oops! Teka Lang... Diskarte Ko 'To with Robin Padilla.

=== Critical and commercial success (2002–2008) ===
In 2002, she starred in a romantic-comedy film by Olivia Lamasan titled Got 2 Believe with real-life partner Rico Yan. The film received critical and box office success some noting it as one of the best romcom movies of all time and has inspired countless films that followed it. On the same year, she did the movie Kailangan Kita with Aga Muhlach. The film was directed by Rory Quintos in where Barretto's acting was once again acclaimed by critics and many has cited it as one of her best works.

In 2003, she was joined by Diether Ocampo, Onemig Bondoc, Carlos Agussi, Assunta De Rossi, Ciara Sotto and Piolo Pascual in the Wenn V. Deramas' barkada series Buttercup (2003–2004).

In 2004, she portrayed a mermaid in the breakthrough fantasy television series Marina with Rafael Rosell, Meryll Soriano, Agot Isidro, Snooky Serna, Malou de Guzman and Cherie Gil. Also on the same year, she starred in the movie Milan opposite Piolo Pascual which was directed by Olivia Lamasan. The film received widespread critical acclaim for its original story and cinematography and has been noted as one of the best romance movies of Philippine Cinema. Her performance of the film also won her a FAMAS Award for Best Actress.

In 2005, she co-starred Jericho Rosales and Diether Ocampo with Gloria Diaz and Hilda Koronel in the film Nasaan Ka Man. The film won her another FAMAS Award for Best Actress and has also been cited as one of her best works. That same year she starred in the film Dubai, directed by Rory Quintos, with co-stars Aga Muhlach and John Lloyd Cruz. She was also part of the ensemble cast of television drama series Ikaw ang Lahat sa Akin alongside Diether Ocampo, Angelika dela Cruz, Shaina Magdayao, Bea Alonzo and John Lloyd Cruz.

In 2006, she starred in the Chito S. Roño's horror film Sukob with Kris Aquino. The movie was the highest-grossing film of that year.

In 2007, she was paired with Piolo Pascual in the television drama series Walang Kapalit which was directed by Wenn V. Deramas.

In 2008, she was cast in Sineserye Presents: Maligno, an extremely violent dark gothic-supernatural thriller television anthology co-starring Kim Chiu, Rafael Rosell and Diether Ocampo. Also that same year, she landed a remarkable role in the television drama series Iisa Pa Lamang together with Angelica Panganiban, Diether Ocampo, Gabby Concepcion, Cherry Pie Picache, and Susan Roces. The series became 2008's hottest television primetime drama and is regarded as one of Claudine's best televisions series.

=== Move to GMA Network (2009–2012) ===
Barretto shocked the local media in November 2009 when she broke ties with her long-time network ABS-CBN and transferred to rival company GMA Network.

In 2010, she started her own weekly drama anthology, Claudine with GMA Network. Also that same year she was a part of a movie produced by GMA Films and Viva Films titled In Your Eyes co-starring Anne Curtis and Richard Gutierrez.

In 2011, she played lead in the television drama Iglot co-starring Jolina Magdangal and Marvin Agustin.

=== Comeback, TV5 (2015–2017) ===
Barretto made a major big screen comeback in 2015 starring in the Star Cinema movie Etiquette for Mistresses alongside Kim Chiu, Iza Calzado, Cheena Crab, Kris Aquino and directed by Chito S. Roño. Despite the controversy of the film, it was acclaimed critically and was a box-office hit. Claudine also marks her first appearance on Maalaala Mo Kaya after more than 20 years, in an episode titled "Itak/Bolo" which aired in October of the same year.

In 2016, she joined TV5 and starred in the television drama series Bakit Manipis ang Ulap? which was directed by Joel Lamangan and co-starring Diether Ocampo, Meg Imperial, and Cesar Montano. That same year she appeared in another MMK episode titled "Luneta Park" which aired in December.

In 2017, she made her first ever appearance at the Star Magic Ball, since she left ABS-CBN in 2009.

In 2020, she signed a management contract with ALV Talent Circuit.

=== Second comeback: GMA Network (2017–present) ===
In 2022, she made a television comeback on GMA Network through leading appearance in Wish Ko Lang. She led two episode of the said show for anniversary which both won in television ratings.

In 2023, Barretto starred in Lovers & Liars aired on GMA Network beating rival show in NUTAM ratings.

== Personal life ==
In March 2002, a month after the box-office success of their movie Got 2 Believe, Barretto's on-screen and real-life partner of four years, Rico Yan, died of acute hemorrhagic pancreatitis.

Barretto married actor Raymart Santiago on March 27, 2006, but annulment proceedings had been initiated in 2013. In 2015, she adopted three children, and has one child with Santiago.

On October 7, 2021, Barretto formalized her bid to run as a city councilor for Olongapo City in the 2022 elections under the PDP–Laban political party. On April 12, 2022, Barretto expressed her support for presidential candidate Bongbong Marcos in the elections. She failed to get elected as councilor.

In 2025, Barretto was hospitalized for depression and revealed that she admitted herself to a rehabilitation facility due to post-traumatic stress disorder.

== Legacy ==
Claudine's outstanding performance as an actress has shaped the entertainment industry and paved the way for the transformation of the film community in previous years.

— Toff Cagape on Claudine Barretto (2018).

Robert Requinta of Manila Bulletin featured two of Barretto's iconic lines from the classic films, Soltera (1999) and Milan (2004), on his list of "28 memorable movie lines that will make you fall in love or cry". Estoisa-Koo and Anarcon of Pep PH also made a list of "10 Famous Lines from Filipino Teleseryes" where her confrontation scene with Angelica Panganiban landed a spot from the 2008 hit series, Iisa Pa Lamang. In 2018, Nadine Lustre paid homage and recreated one of Barretto's most iconic advertisement for the clothing line Folded & Hung. Barretto's work has influenced younger artists, including Mariel Rodriguez, Kim Chiu, Rita Daniela, Julia Barretto and others.

== Filmography ==
=== Film ===
Year	Title	Role	Notes
1993	Kumusta Ka Aking Mahal	Mariel	
1993	Pulis Patola		
1993	Home Along Da Riles: Da Movie	Bing Kosme	Film based on situational comedy series
1993	May Minamahal	Pinky	
1994	Taong Gubat		
1994	Sige Ihataw Mo!		
1994	Eat All You Can!	Kim	
1994	Muntik na Kitang Minahal	Marianne	
1994	Lagalag: The Eddie Fernandez Story	Pops Fernandez	
1995	Pare Ko	Nadine	
1995	Mangarap Ka	Jenny	
1996	Radio Romance	Marianne Cordero	
1996	May Nagmamahal Sa'yo	Janine	
1996	Oki Doki Doc : The Movie	Toni	Film based on situational comedy series
1996	Madrasta	Rachel	
1997	Home Along Da Riles 2	Bing Kosme	Film based on situational comedy series
1997	Calvento Files: The Movie	Valerie	Title: Balintuwad. With Mula sa Puso co-star Diether Ocampo.
1997	F.L.A.M.E.S.: The Movie	Karina	Title: Pangako. With Mula sa Puso co-star Rico Yan.
1998	Dahil Mahal na Mahal Kita	Carmela "Mela" Ocampo	
1999	Mula sa Puso: The Movie	Olivia "Via" Pereira-Maglayon	Film version based on the television drama series.
1999	Soltera	Liza	Reunited with Mula sa Puso co-star Diether Ocampo. Nominated – FAP Award for Best Supporting Actress support with Diamond Star Maricel Soriano
2000	Anak	Carla	Co-lead role with veteran actress Vilma Santos.
2001	Oops! Teka Lang... Diskarte Ko 'To	Marian	
2002	Got 2 Believe	Antonia "Toni" Villacorta	Last film with Rico Yan before his death. Released about a month before Yan's death. Reunited with Mula sa Puso co-star. GMMSF Box-Office Entertainment Award for Box-Office Queen
2002	Kailangan Kita	Lena Duran	GMMSF Box-Office Entertainment Award for Box-Office Queen; Nominated – FAMAS Award for Best Actress; Nominated – FAP Luna Award for Best Actress; Nominated – Gaward Urian Award for Best Actress; Nominated – PMPC Star Award for Movies for Movie Actress of the Year
2004	Milan	Jenny	FAMAS Award for Best Actress; FAP Award for Best Actress; GMMSF Box-Office Entertainment Award for Box-Office Queen; Nominated – Gaward Urian Award for Best Actress; Nominated – PMPC Star Award for Movies for Movie Actress of the Year
2005	Nasaan Ka Man	Pilar	FAMAS Award for Best Actress; Gaward Pasado Award for Best Actress; Maria Clara Award for Best Actress; PMPC Star Award for Movies for Movie Actress of the Year; Nominated – FAP Luna Award for Best Actress; Nominated – Gawad Urian Award for Best Actress
2005	Dubai	Faye	Maria Clara Award for Best Actress; Nominated – ENPRESS Golden Screen Award for Best Supporting Actress; Nominated – FAP Luna Award for Best Actress
2006	Sukob	Diana	#3 Highest-grossing Filipino film of all time GMMSF Box-Office Entertainment Award for Box-Office Queen (shared with Kris Aquino); Nominated – FAMAS Award for Best Actress; Nominated – Gawad Pasado Award for Best Actress
2010	Noy	Herself/Cameo	
2010	In Your Eyes	Ciara delos Santos	Nominated – FAP Luna Award for Best Actress
2015	Etiquette for Mistresses	Chloe Zamora	Comeback with Star Cinema and reunion project with Kris Aquino after Sukob.
2022	Deception	Rose	Reunion project with Mark Anthony Fernandez after Mangarap Ka; To be directed by Joel Lamangan.
2022	Mamasapano: Now It Can Be Told	Erica Pabalinas	Special Role
2023	Loyalista: The Untold Story of Imelda Papin	Imelda Papin	
2024	When Magic Hurts		
2026	Home Along Da Riles: Da Reunion	Bing Kosme	Film based on situational comedy series

=== Television ===
Year	Title	Role(s)
1992–1996	Ang TV	Herself
1992–1997	Home Along Da Riles	Rebecca "Bing" Kosme
1993–1995	Okay Ka, Fairy Ko!	Guest
1993–1998; 1999–2000	Oki Doki Doc	Toni Makunatan
1993–1998	Palibhasa Lalake	Tracey / Guest
1993	Maalaala Mo Kaya: Walkman	Valerie
1993	Maalaala Mo Kaya: Tropeo	Elvie
1993	Maalaala Mo Kaya: Brilyante at Bubog	Gina
1995–2009; 2015–2022; 2026–present	ASAP XP	Co-host / Performer
1996-1997	Star Drama Theater Presents: Claudine	Various Roles
1996	Maalaala Mo Kaya: Valentines Card	Stella
1996	Familia Zaragoza	Young Amparo Zaragaoza
1996	Maalaala Mo Kaya: Pahiram ng Isang Pasko	Marita
1996	Flames: Forevermore	Arlene
1997–1999	Mula sa Puso	Olivia "Via" Pereira
1997	Gimik	Danielle (Special Guest)
1997	Maalaala Mo Kaya: Liwanag	Carolina
1998	Maalaala Mo Kaya: Desaparesidos	Millet
1998	Wansapanataym: Pamana ni Lola Gare	Antonette, Anne, Annette
1999	Wansapanataym: Pamana ni Lola Gare	Antonette, Anne, Annette
1999–2001	Saan Ka Man Naroroon	Rosario S. Ocampo / Rosario de Villa / Rose Anne; Rosenda S. Ocampo; Rosita S. Ocampo / Rosemarie Madrigal
2001–2003	Sa Dulo ng Walang Hanggan	Angeline Montenegro-Crisotomo / Angelina
2002	Wansapanataym: Starra	Starra
2002	The Journey of My Heart	Herself
2003–2004	Buttercup	Meg
2004	Marina	Marina Aguas / Cristina Sto. Domingo
2004	Lagot Ka, Isusumbong Kita!	Princess Kleo / Episode guest
2004	Home Along Da Airport	Bing Kosme
2005	Ikaw ang Lahat sa Akin	Nea Cruz-Fontanilla
2006	Star Magic Presents: Family Pictures	Gwen
2006	Your Song: God Bless Ye Merry Gentlemen	Episode guest
2006	Komiks Presents: Bampy	Episode guest as nun
2007	Walang Kapalit	Melanie Santillian
2008	Sineserye Presents: Maligno	Angela Cortez
2008	Iisa Pa Lamang	Catherine Ramirez / Cate Dela Rhea
2009	May Bukas Pa	Julia
2010	Bb. Pilipinas	Herself / Judge
2010	Claudine	Various roles
2010	Bantatay	Shiela
2010–2012	Untold Stories	Battered Wife
2010–2011	Jillian: Namamasko Po	Lynette "Lyn" Rivera
2011	Spooky Nights	Various roles
2011	Iglot	Mariella Dacera-Rivera
2012	Tween Hearts	Clarisse Benitez
2012	Biritera	Carmela Abesamis
2015	Maalaala Mo Kaya: Itak	Leni
2016	Maalaala Mo Kaya: Luneta Park	Lorena
2016	Bakit Manipis ang Ulap?	Marla Alvarez
2019	Maalaala Mo Kaya: Dance Floor	Vivian Cunanan
2022	Wish Ko Lang: Bisita	Manda
2022	Tadhana: Hanggang Kailan	Dolores "Dolly" Montemayor
2023–2024	Lovers & Liars	Olivia "Via" Rosario-Laurente
2025	Avenues of the Diamond	Selene Vera
2025–2026	Totoy Bato	Diamond
2026	Viva One Originals: Ashtine Episode: "Bahay-bahayan"	Clara
2026	I Love You Ex	Helena

== Accolades ==
As a film actress, Barretto has received two FAMAS Award for Best Actress for movies Milan (2004) and Nasaan Ka Man (2005) and a Luna Award for Best Actress for the same movie, Milan. In 2016, she won Dangal ng PASADO sa Pangkatang Pagganap ng may Mataas na Papuri in the 18th Gawad PASADO Awards for her film Etiquette for Mistresses (2015).

On television, she bagged the Best Young Actress award from Parangal ng Bayan in 1999 for Mula Sa Puso and was nominated as Best Drama Actress by the Asian TV Awards in 2000 for Saan Ka Man Naroroon.

=== Film ===
Year	Category	Movie	Organization	Remarks
2000	Best Supporting Actress	Soltera	FAP Awards	Nominated
2003	Best Actress	Kailangan Kita	PMPC Star Awards	Nominated
2003	Best Actress	Kailangan Kita	FAMAS	Nominated
2003	Best Actress	Kailangan Kita	FAP	Nominated
2003	Best Actress	Kailangan Kita	Gawad URIAN	Nominated
2005	Best Actress	Milan	23rd FAP Luna Awards	Won
2005	Best Actress	Milan	53rd FAMAS Award	Won
2005	Best Actress	Milan	PMPC Star awards for Movies	Nominated
2005	Best Actress	Milan	Gawad URIAN	Nominated
2006	Best Actress	Nasaan Ka Man	8th Gawad PASADO Award	Won
2006	Best Actress	Nasaan Ka Man	22nd PMPC Star awards for Movies	Won
2006	Best Actress	Nasaan Ka Man	54th FAMAS Awards	Won
2006	Best Actress	Nasaan Ka Man	FAP Luna	Nominated
2006	Best Actress	Nasaan Ka Man	Gawad URIAN	Nominated
2006	Best Actress	Dubai	55th Maria Clara Awards	Won
2006	Best Actress	Dubai	FAP Luna	Nominated
2006	Best Supporting Actress	Dubai	ENPRESS Golden Screen	Nominated
2006	Best Performance by Male or Female, Adult or Child, Individual or Ensemble in Leading or Supporting Role	Nasaan Ka Man	Young Critics Circle	Nominated
2007	Best Actress	Sukob	Gawad PASADO	Nominated
2007	Best Actress	Sukob	FAMAS Award	Nominated
2011	Best Actress	In Your Eyes	FAP Luna	Nominated
2016	Dangal ng PASADO sa Pangkatang Pagganap ng may Mataas na Papuri	Etiquette for Mistresses	18th Gawad PASADO Awards	Won
2022	Best Actress	Deception	35th PMPC Star awards for Movies	Nominated
2024	Movie Supporting Actress of the Year	Mamasapano: Now It Can Be Told	39th PMPC Star awards for Movies	Nominated

=== Television ===
Year	Category	TV Show	Organization	Remarks
1993	Best New TV Personality	Ang TV	PMPC Star Awards for Television	Won
1997	Best TV Personality	Star Drama Presents: Kasunduan	PMPC Star Awards for Television	Won
1999	Best Young Actress	Mula Sa Puso	Parangal ng Bayan	Won
2000	Best Drama Actress	Saan Ka Man Naroroon	Asian TV Awards	Nominated
2003	Best Female Variety Show Host	ASAP Mania	PMPC Star Awards for Television	Won
2005	Best Drama Actress	Marina	PMPC Star Awards for Television	Nominated
2006	Best Drama Actress	Ikaw ang Lahat sa Akin	PMPC Star Awards for Television	Nominated
2007	Best Drama Actress	Walang Kapalit	PMPC Star Awards for Television	Nominated
2009	Best Drama Actress	Iisa Pa Lamang	57th FAMAS Award	Nominated
2009	Best Drama Actress	Iisa Pa Lamang	23rd PMPC Star Awards for Television	Nominated
2016	Best Single Performance by an Actress	MMK: Itak/Bolo	PMPC Star Awards for Television	Won
2022	FAVE TWINS/TRIPLETS	Saan Ka Man Naroon	Jeepney TV Fan Favorite Awards	Won

=== Special awards and recognitions ===
Barretto was awarded Box Office Queen by Guillermo Mendoza Memorial Scholarship Foundation in 2003 and 2006 for the commercial success of her movies, Got 2 Believe and Sukob.

Hailed as one of the Top 20 stars who ruled the decade (2000–2009) by YES! Magazine, she ranked 6th along with other notable personalities like Kris Aquino, Judy Ann Santos, Vic Sotto and Sharon Cuneta.

In 2009, she was recognised as one of Cinema One's 15 Legends, together with 14 other iconic film stars of the Philippines who helped define Philippine Cinema which includes Fernando Poe Jr., Dolphy, Nora Aunor, Susan Roces, Nida Blanca, Christopher de Leon, Vilma Santos, Maricel Soriano, Aga Muhlach, Robin Padilla, Judy Ann Santos, John Lloyd Cruz, Sharon Cuneta, and Piolo Pascual.

=== Box office ===
Year	Group	Award
2003	Guillermo Mendoza Memorial Scholarship Foundation	Box Office Queen (Got 2 Believe)
2005	Guillermo Mendoza Memorial Scholarship Foundation	Ms. RP Movies (Milan)
2006	Guillermo Mendoza Memorial Scholarship Foundation	Box Office Queen (Sukob)

=== Soundtrack ===
Year	Title	Producer	Organization
2006	"The Gift"	Star Records	BMG Music Publishing, Ltd. and Sony Music Entertainment (Philippines), Inc.

=== Special awards ===
Year	Group	Award
2003	German Moreno and FAMAS Awards	German Moreno Youth Achievement Award
2008	German Moreno	Walk of Fame Awardee
2019	FDCP Sine Sandaan	Leading Lady
2023	6th Philippine Empowered Men and Women Awards	Lifetime Achievement Awards
2023	Asean Excellence Achievers Awards	Asean Excellence for Acting and Phenomenal Filmography
2023	PMPC Star Awards for Movies	Female Star of the Night
2024	Global Trends Business Leaders Awards	PHILIPPINE MOVIES & TV INDUSTRY EXCELLENCE
2024	Asia's Golden Icon Awards	Asia's Multi-Awarded Actress

=== Recognitions ===
Year	Group	Award
1999	S-Movie Magazine: Brightest Star of 1999	Brightest Star of 1999 (13)
2009	CinemaOne	15 CinemaOne Legends (with Fernando Poe Jr., Dolphy, Nora Aunor, Susan Roces, Nida Blanca, Christopher de Leon, Vilma Santos, Maricel Soriano, Aga Muhlach, Robin Padilla, Judy Ann Santos, John Lloyd Cruz, Sharon Cuneta and Piolo Pascual)
2010	YES! Magazine	Ranked as 6th Celebrity Who Ruled The Decade (2000–2009)
2010	YES! Magazine's 100 Beautiful Stars	11th Most Beautiful Star
2011	InTrend Magazine's Ziana Zain Top 10 Hot Asian Moms	Top 3 Most Hottest Mom in Asia
2014	1st PEP List Awards	Female Newsmaker of the Year
