= Anak (film) =

The Child
- Directed by: Rory B. Quintos
- Screenplay by: Ricardo Lee; Raymond Lee
- Produced by: Charo Santos-Concio; Malou N. Santos; Trina N. Dayrit
- Starring: Vilma Santos; Claudine Barretto
- Cinematography: Joe Batac
- Edited by: George Jarlego
- Music by: Jessie Lasaten
- Production company: Star Cinema
- Distributed by: Star Cinema (Philippines); Toho-Towa (Japan); 20th Century Fox (Worldwide)
- Release date: May 10, 2000
- Running time: 119 minutes
- Country: Philippines
- Language: Filipino
- Box office: ₱165.93 million

Anak, also known as Anak: The Movie, internationally titled as The Child, is a 2000 Filipino family drama film directed by Rory B. Quintos from a story and screenplay written by Ricky Lee and Moira Lang. The film stars Vilma Santos and Claudine Barretto, with Joel Torre and Baron Geisler, and tells the story of a mother who works as a domestic helper in Hong Kong and her struggle to see her children grow up, for whom she hopes for a better future.

Produced by Star Cinema, the film was released on May 10, 2000, and became a box office hit. It grossed over ₱165 million in its theatrical run, surpassing Isusumbong Kita sa Tatay Ko... to become the highest-grossing Philippine film of all time until the release of Ang Tanging Ina in 2003. It was the Philippines' submission to the 73rd Academy Awards for the Academy Award for Best Foreign Language Film, but it was not nominated.

The film has been restored by ABS-CBN Film Archives. The restored version premiered on ABS-CBN's movie channel, Cinema One, on May 22, 2015.

== Plot ==
Josie is a mother of three children, Carla, Michael, and Daday, from the Philippines who takes a job in Hong Kong as a nanny for a wealthy couple for several years. Although she knows she can earn more in Hong Kong than at home, she worries about how her absence will affect her children, especially after her husband dies not long after she leaves.

When Josie returns home, she brings gifts and savings from her salary, intending to use the money to start a business. Her children, however, struggle to accept her return. Daday and Michael remain guarded, though they eventually repair their relationship with their mother. Carla, the oldest, openly resents Josie for what she sees as abandoning the family. She challenges her mother's authority, dates boys she knows Josie would disapprove of, flaunts her emerging sexuality, and begins using drugs.

Eventually, Carla recognizes the harm caused by her behavior and understands why her mother did not return home when her father died. She forgives Josie, changes her ways, and promises to care for Michael and Daday when Josie returns to Hong Kong.

== Cast ==
- Vilma Santos as Josie Agbisit
- Claudine Barretto as Carla
- Joel Torre as Rudy
- Baron Geisler as Michael
- Sheila Mae Alvero as Daday
- Amy Austria as Lyn
- Cherry Pie Picache as Mercy
- Leandro Muñoz as Brian
- Jodi Sta. Maria as Bernadette
- Tess Dumpit as Norma
- Cris Michelena as Arnel
- Hazel Ann Mendoza as Young Carla
- Daniel Morial as Young Michael
- Gino Paul Guzman as Don Don
- Odette Khan as Mrs. Madrid
- Jiro Manio as Jason
- Don Laurel as Lester

== Reception ==
=== Box office ===
Anak was a box-office success. The film grossed ₱14 million on its first day and earned ₱165.9 million for its theatrical run, surpassing Isusumbong Kita sa Tatay Ko... to become the highest-grossing Philippine film of all time. Its record was surpassed in 2003 by Ang Tanging Ina.

=== Accolades ===
Year	Award-giving body	Category	Recipient	Result
2000	Catholic Mass Media Award	Best Film	Anak	Won

== See also ==
- Cinema of the Philippines
