= Dubai (2005 film) =

- Dubai DVD Cover
- Directed by: Rory B. Quintos
- Screenplay by: Ricky Lee; Shaira Mella Salvador; John Paul E. Abellera
- Story by: Ricky Lee
- Produced by: Charo Santos-Concio; Malou N. Santos; Tess V. Fuentes
- Starring: Aga Muhlach; John Lloyd Cruz; Claudine Barretto
- Cinematography: Charlie S. Peralta
- Edited by: Marya Ignacio
- Music by: Jessie Q. Lasaten
- Production company: Star Cinema
- Distributed by: Star Cinema
- Release date: September 28, 2005
- Running time: 110 minutes
- Country: Philippines
- Languages: Filipino; Arabic
- Box office: ₱115,200,000.00 (US$9,359,539.20)

Dubai is a 2005 Filipino drama film directed by Rory B. Quintos from a screenplay written by Ricky Lee, who solely developed the story concept, Shaira Mella Salvador, and John Paul Abellera. Set and filmed in the United Arab Emirates, it tells the story of three overseas Filipino workers who unexpectedly become connected by friendship and love. The film stars Aga Muhlach and John Lloyd Cruz, who play brothers, and Claudine Barretto, who plays the woman with whom the two men fall in love at the same time.

Produced and distributed by Star Cinema, the film was theatrically released in the Philippines on September 28, 2005.

== Plot summary ==
Raffy and Andrew were orphaned as kids and had only each other to depend on. Raffy has spent the last nine years of his life working in Dubai. His ultimate goal is to fulfil a lifelong dream: to eventually move to Canada with his younger brother, Andrew. The Alvarez brothers are finally united when Andrew goes to Dubai.

In Dubai, Andrew meets Faye, one of Raffy's many girlfriends. They hit it off well in spite of their age difference. She becomes his guide, comforter and lover. Seeing the two together, Raffy realises that he still really loves Faye. When Andrew discovers that Raffy still loves Faye, conflict arises between the brothers, almost severing the ties that bind them. In the end, what they choose and achieve is not as planned, but their experiences in Dubai lead to new beginnings in their lives.

== Cast and characters ==
=== Main cast ===
- Aga Muhlach as Raffy
- John Lloyd Cruz as Andrew
- Claudine Barretto as Faye

=== Supporting cast ===
- Michael de Mesa as Basi
- Pokwang as Cookie
- Dimples Romana as Clarice
- Ana Capri as Lenny
- Mico Aytona as young Raffy
- John Manalo as young Andrew
- Phoemela Baranda as Melba
- Mymy Davao as Lita
- Gino Paul Guzman as Nilo
- Ivan Camacho as Pol
- Quay Evano
- Jinkee Buzon-Castillo

== Production ==
=== Pre-production ===
In February 2004, scriptwriter Ricky Lee, along with co-writer Shaira Mella Salvador, director Rory Quintos, and producer Tess Fuentes, flew to Dubai in the United Arab Emirates to conduct research for the film and interview various Overseas Filipino Workers in the emirate. The interviews would serve as a composite for the film.

=== Development ===
Two months after the production teams visited Dubai, director Quintos, along with the three main cast, and a skeleton crew composed of 13 people, went to Dubai to shoot the movie. Among the shooting locations were the Dubai International Airport, Burj Al-Arab, Dubai Creek and Sheikh Zayed Road. Scenes were also shot in a shopping mall, a bazaar (souq), and in the desert.

Scriptwriter Lee remarks about the reason for making the film ten years later, in 2015: “While I don’t remember much about making Dubai, I do remember that what we wanted to show was that no matter where a Filipino is, wherever he is in the world, he will remain a Filipino,” Lee says. “That being a Filipino is not about where you are, it’s something ingrained in the heart.”

== Release ==
The film premiered in Philippine cinemas on September 28, 2005. In October 2005, the film was screened in the United Arab Emirates for three days at the Al Nasr Cinema in Dubai.

== Soundtrack ==
- "Ikaw Lamang"
  Composed by Ogie Alcasid
  Performed By Gary Valenciano

== Accolades ==
Accolades received by Dubai
Award	Date of announcement/ceremony	Category	Recipient(s)	Result	Ref.
2006 Young Critics Circle Awards	March 17, 2006	Best Actor	Aga Muhlach	Won	
2006 Young Critics Circle Awards	March 17, 2006	Best Supporting Actor	John Lloyd Cruz	Won	
2006 Young Critics Circle Awards	March 17, 2006	Best Cinematography	Charlie S. Peralta	Won	
54th FAMAS Awards	November 12, 2006	Best Picture	Dubai	Nominated	
54th FAMAS Awards	November 12, 2006	Best Director	Rory B. Quintos	Nominated	
54th FAMAS Awards	November 12, 2006	Best Story	Ricky Lee	Nominated	
54th FAMAS Awards	November 12, 2006	Best Screenplay	Ricky Lee, Shaira Mella Salvador, and John Paul Abellera	Nominated	
54th FAMAS Awards	November 12, 2006	Best Actor	Aga Muhlach	Nominated	
54th FAMAS Awards	November 12, 2006	Best Supporting Actor	John Lloyd Cruz	Won	
54th FAMAS Awards	November 12, 2006	Best Child Actor	John Manalo	Nominated	
54th FAMAS Awards	November 12, 2006	Best Musical Score	Jessie Q. Lasaten	Nominated	
54th FAMAS Awards	November 12, 2006	Best Theme Song	"Ikaw Lamang" by Gary Valenciano	Nominated	
54th FAMAS Awards	November 12, 2006	Best Sound	Arnold Reodica	Won	

== See also ==
- Filipinos in the United Arab Emirates
