= Rory Quintos =

Filipino film director

- Born: Rory B. Quintos; October 31, 1962 (age 63); Manila, Philippines
- Occupations: TV and film director
- Years active: 1989–2020

Rory B. Quintos (born October 31, 1962) is a Filipino former television and film director. She graduated from the University of the Philippines Diliman, where she majored in broadcasting. She began a career in television where she successively spent years as production assistant, production manager, floor director and associate producer before finally crossing over to film as an assistant director first and eventually as a TV and film director.

== Filmography ==
=== Film ===
Year	Title	Associated Film Studio(s)	Note(s)
1995	Basta't Kasama Kita	Star Cinema	
1995	Mangarap Ka	Star Cinema	
1996	Sa Aking mga Kamay	Star Cinema	
1997	Paano Ang Puso Ko?	Star Cinema	
1997	Ipaglaban Mo: The Movie II	Star Cinema	
1998	Kay Tagal Kang Hinintay	Star Cinema	
2000	Anak	Star Cinema	
2002	Kailangan Kita	Star Cinema	
2005	Dubai	Star Cinema	
2009	Love Me Again	Star Cinema	
2012	Suddenly It's Magic	Star Cinema	

=== Television ===
Year	Title	Network
1994	Maalaala Mo Kaya	ABS-CBN
1997	Esperanza	ABS-CBN
2000	Pangako Sa'yo	ABS-CBN
2003	Darating ang Umaga	ABS-CBN
2004	Krystala	ABS-CBN
2005	Ikaw ang Lahat sa Akin	ABS-CBN
2006	Sa Piling Mo	ABS-CBN
2007	Ysabella	ABS-CBN
2007	Maging Sino Ka Man: Ang Pagbabalik	ABS-CBN
2009	Only You	ABS-CBN
2009	Precious Hearts Romances Presents: My Cheating Heart	ABS-CBN
2010	Precious Hearts Romances Presents: Martha Cecilia's Kristine	ABS-CBN
2011	Maria la del Barrio	ABS-CBN
2012	Princess and I	ABS-CBN
2014	The Legal Wife	ABS-CBN
2014	Forevermore	ABS-CBN
2015	Pangako Sa 'Yo	ABS-CBN
2017	A Love to Last	ABS-CBN
2017	La Luna Sangre	ABS-CBN
2018	Sana Dalawa ang Puso	ABS-CBN
