= Sa Dulo ng Walang Hanggan =

2001–03 Philippine television drama series

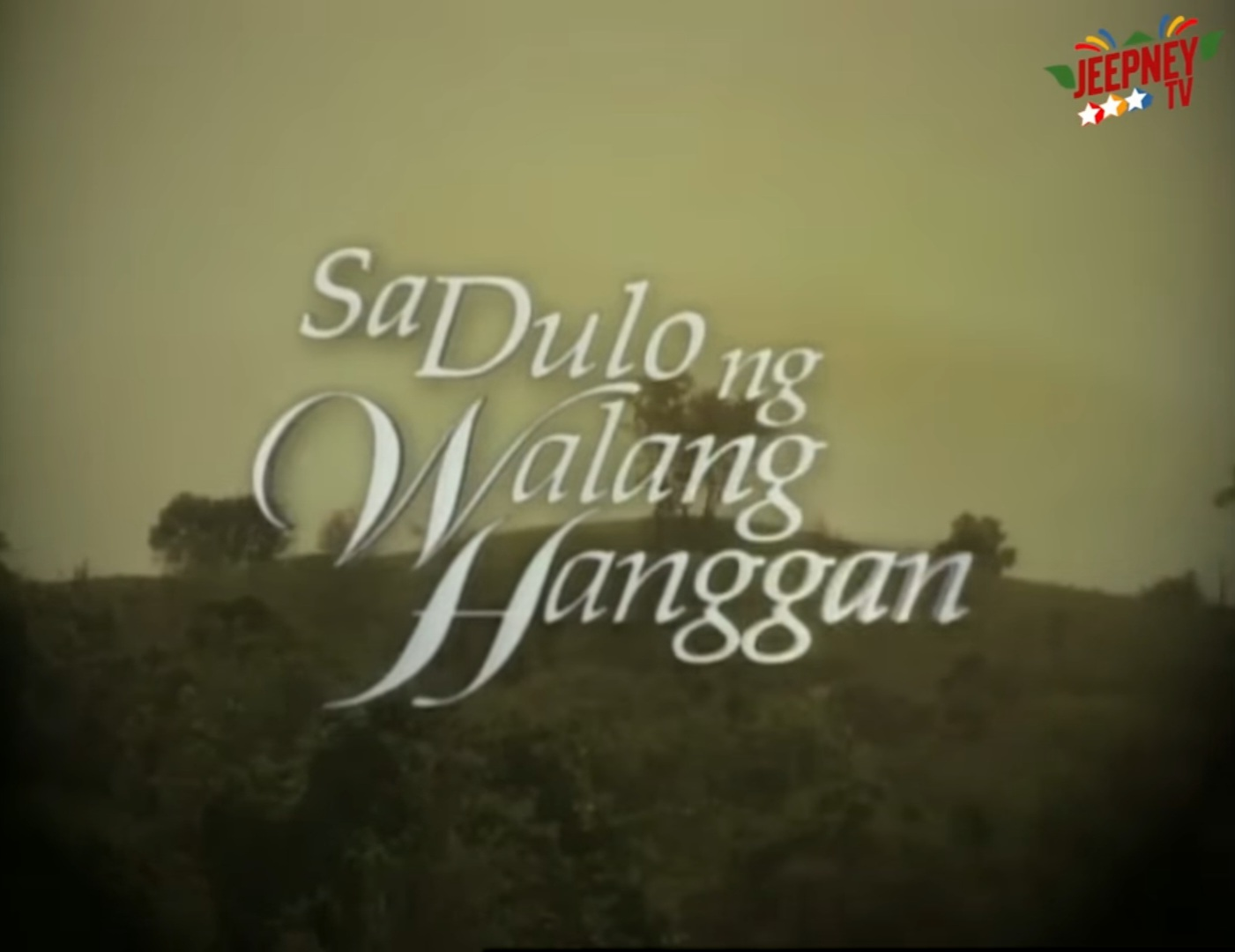
- Title card
- Genre: Drama; Romance
- Created by: ABS-CBN Studios
- Written by: Keiko Aquino; Rondel Lindayag; Zoilo Barrel; Shugo Praico
- Directed by: Wenn V. Deramas; Andoy Ranay
- Creative director: Deo Endrinal
- Starring: Claudine Barretto; Carlos Agassi; Mylene Dizon
- Theme music composer: George Canseco
- Ending theme: "Hanggang Sa Dulo Ng Walang Hanggan" by Zsa Zsa Padilla
- Country of origin: Philippines
- Original language: Filipino
- No. of seasons: 2
- No. of episodes: 505

Production
- Executive producer: Mae Santos
- Editors: Ben Panaligan; Rachel Aguilos; Oden Lazatin
- Running time: 23-36 minutes
- Production company: Dreamscape Entertainment Television

Original release
- Network: ABS-CBN
- Release: March 26, 2001 – February 28, 2003

Related
- Walang Hanggan

Sa Dulo ng Walang Hanggan (transl. at the end of forever, international title: Till The End of Time) is a Philippine television drama broadcast by ABS-CBN. Starring Claudine Barretto, Carlos Agassi, and Mylene Dizon, it aired on the network's Teleserye Primetime Bida from March 26, 2001 to February 28, 2003 replacing Saan Ka Man Naroroon and replaced by Darating ang Umaga.

The series is currently available on Jeepney TV's YouTube channel

== Premise ==
In 1912, where Don Teodoro (Ronaldo Valdez), the President Municipal of Bulacan, announces the engagement of his eldest son, Alfonso (Bernard Palanca), to Angelina (Claudine Barretto). The marriage is arranged under difficult circumstances: Angelina’s mother, Consuelo (Tetchie Agbayani), persuades her daughter to accept the proposal in exchange for the release of her father, Sebastian (Spanky Manikan), a bandido accused of killing an American supporter.

Unknown to many except to Minerva (Carol Banawa) and young Carmela (Shaina Magdayao), Angelina's love is reserved only for one man, Benedicto (Carlos Agassi), Alfonso’s younger brother, with whom she shared a youthful romance before Benedicto was sent away to Spain at Don Teodoro’s command. However, upon his return, Angelina and Benedicto’s feelings are rekindled, creating a conflict between familial obligation and personal devotion.

Alfonso, whose ambition and jealousy define much of his character, becomes determined to claim Angelina as his own. He takes deliberate steps to separate the couple, resorting to increasingly manipulative and destructive measures. As the situation escalates, Angelina is left to reconcile the competing demands of loyalty to her family and the persistence of her forbidden love.

The series later transitions to 2001, when Angeline (also portrayed by Barretto) celebrates her engagement to Hector (Troy Montero). As a gift, her parents, Norberto (Robert Arevalo) and Corazon (Boots Anson-Roa), present her with a rest house in Bulacan. Unknown to them, the property is the same place where Angelina, Benedicto, and Alfonso’s story once unfolded.

Angeline is revealed to be the reincarnation of Angelina, and her presence in the house reawakens echoes of the past. The link between the two timelines is understood only by Lola Carmela (Gloria Romero), who is now 97 years old—the sole living witness to the events of the past—and who possesses a locket containing the history of the ill-fated romance. Through Lola Carmela, the tale of Angelina and Benedicto resurfaces, intertwining with the present lives of Angeline and Benjie. Alongside this is the looming threat of Alfonso’s curse, raising questions about who he is in the present timeline and how his return may affect the lives of Angeline and Benjie.

The narrative centers on themes of love, betrayal, and destiny, exploring whether the unfulfilled romance of Angelina and Benedicto in the early twentieth century can find resolution through their reincarnated counterparts in the modern era.

== Cast and characters ==
=== Main cast ===
- Claudine Barretto as Ángelina (1912) † / Angeline Montenegro - Crisostomo (Main Protagonist) †
- Carlos Agassi as Benedicto (1912) † / Benjamin "Benjie" Ylagan (Protagonist) †
- Mylene Dizon as Susan Concepcion / Sarah Concepcion / Sally Perida / Sally Benipayo / Sally Concepcion / Samantha Diaz / Sister Salvacion / Solita Castro (Main Antagonist) †

=== Special participation ===
- Gloria Romero † as Lola Carmela "Mameng" Estocapio
- Helen Gamboa as Nelia Santos / Nelia Wilwayco
- Gretchen Barretto as Andrea Fuentes-Crisostomo / Sabrina Vanguardia †

=== Supporting cast ===
==== 1912 cast ====
- Tetchie Agbayani as Doña Consuelo
- Shamaine Centenera-Buencamino as Doña Veronica
- Spanky Manikan † as Don Sebastian
- Karla Estrada as Sening
- Carol Banawa and Dianne dela Fuente as Minerva Soriano
- Bernard Palanca as Alfonso (Antagonist)
- John Lloyd Cruz as Emilio "Emil" Bustamante
- Shaina Magdayao as young Carmela Estocapio

==== 2001-2003 cast ====
- Eugene Domingo as Feliza "Simang" Soriano-Bernardo and Old Niknik Bernardo (final episode)
- Frances Makil-Ignacio as Anita Brown and Tamara Sembrano (Antagonist)
- Luis Alandy as Clarence Cristobal
- Gladys Reyes as Ruella Agbayani (Antagonist) †
- Robert Arevalo † as Norberto Montenegro †
- Pilar Pilapil as Adora Evangelista (Antagonist)
- Boots Anson-Roa as Corazon Montenegro †
- Ronaldo Valdez † as Don Teodoro (1912) and Don Miguel Crisostomo, Sr. †
- Jaime Fabregas as Menandro Soriano (Antagonist) †
- Victor Neri as Joaquin Montenegro †
- Jojit Lorenzo as Gaspar Bernardo †
- Lorena "Ena" Garcia as Niknik Bernardo
- Matet de Leon as Lucila "Lucy" Ylagan-Cristobal (Anti-hero)
- Glydel Mercado as Amelia Fuentes (Antagonist) †
- Emilio Garcia as Raul Ylagan
- Leandro Muñoz as Miguel "MJ" Crisostomo, Jr. / Miguelito (Antagonist) †
- Kaye Abad as Sophia Bustamante-Ylagan †
- Don Laurel as George Cruz †
- Justin Cuyugan as Dondi Leviste †
- Angela Velez as Millet Benitez
- Troy Montero as Hector Soriano †
- JM Altamerano as Isaac Montenegro
- Daryl Lelis as Benedict dela Rosa-Ylagan

=== Recurring cast ===
- Serena Dalrymple as Maying
- Danilo Barrios as Ricardo "Dong" Galvez
- Gina Pareño as Lita Cristobal
- Tommy Abuel as Delfin Cristobal
- Ricky Belmonte† as Salvador "Badong" Santos †
- Vangie Labalan † as Tiya Belita
- Camille Prats as Teri
- Amy Perez as Miriam Dela Rosa †
- Angelina "Miles" Kanapi as Encar Ylagan / Elaine
- Angel Jacob as Krissy Concepcion
- Len Ag Santos as Catalina
- Christian Vasquez as Matthew Monteclaro
- Pinky Amador as Myrna Kamamoto
- Dennis Trillo as Jojo
- Candy Pangilinan as Gundina P. Pigil
- Dennis Roldan as Dr. Anton dela Rosa
- Nestor de Villa † as Gov. Federico Bustamante †
- Alma Moreno as Mayor Socorro Bustamante †
- Susan Africa as Christina Tiongson †
- Lotlot de Leon as Pureza
- Harlene Bautista as Mirinisa
- Juan Rodrigo as Efren Wilwayco (Antagonist)
- Ciara Sotto as Barbara Wilwayco (Anti-hero)
- Georgina Sandico as Atty. Ariane Manalo - Wilwayco † (Antagonist)
- Tess Antonio as Melba / Josie Perida
- Julio Pacheco as Young Ricardo "Dong" Galvez
- Eliza Pineda as Petra
- Anna Larrucea as Santina
- Tom Olivar as David
- Froilan Sales † as Alejandro Ortiz †
- Girlie Alcantara as Mrs. Ortiz
- Apreal Tolentino as real Sarah Concepcion †
- Dido dela Paz as Rodrigo Concepcion
- Ricky Rivero † as Mr. Neil Alcantara
- Martin Gonzalo as Martin
- Marco Alejandro as Marco
- Renee Salud as Mama Renee
- Roderick Lindayag as Greg †
- Dolly de Leon as Atty. Panlilio
- Brando Legaspi as Serge †
- Marvin Ramales as Galo
- Glenda Garcia as Thelma Kamamoto
- Akira Mamoto as Mr. Kamamoto
- Nap Miranda as Thelma's mistress
- Reggie Curley as Atty. Ernest de Dios
- Adrian Albert as Miguel "Thirdy" Crisostomo III
- Nasem Saatchi as Althea Crisostomo †
- Jane Oineza as Arabella Crisostomo
- Dante Castro as Mayor Clemente
- Ku Aquino as Atty. Salvacion
- Ronalisa Cheng as Ineng
- Clint Albert as Sophia's friend
- Olga Havran as Sophia's friend
- Debraliz as Epang
- William Martinez as Mark †
- Yayo Aguila as Esther †
- Neil Ryan Sese as Neil
- Susan Corpuz as Dra. Abad
- Alfred Vargas as Lauro Mercado
- Irma Adlawan as Mercy Flores
- Nita Grandea as Hazel / Yaya Medel
- Dan Alvaro as Lawin
- Don Umali as Don
- Ian Delfino as Jun (Restaurant staff of Nelia Santos)
- Ian Del Carmen as PAOCTF Officer
- George Lim as Mr. Chua
- Mike Lloren as NBI Agent
- Peewee O'Hara as Dir. Asuncion
- Chandro Concepcion
- Coby Ramirez as Coby
- Ricci Chan as Ricci
- Gigi Locsin as Adora's Friend
- Banawe Miclat as Mental Hospital Patient and Evelyn Esteban

=== Guest Cast ===
- Vivian Foz as Teri's Mother
- Roselle Nava as Herself
- Cacai Bautista as Taong grasa
- Carmi Martin as Dra. Aquino
- Igi Boy Flores as Bugoy

== Trivia about this series ==
- Sa Dulo ng Walang Hanggan is based on a 1980 serialized komiks novel by Vincent Kua, Jr. entitled Huwag Kang Lumuha, Gabing Mapanglaw
- Rico Yan was originally going to portray Benjie/Benedicto but turned down the role due to his commitments, including the noontime show Magandang Tanghali Bayan. The role went to Carlos Agassi instead. After turning down the role, however, Yan was offered again to be part of the soap, this time playing the part of MJ/Miguel Jr. It was reported that upon his return from Lenten vacation in Palawan, he was to start taping for the series. Unfortunately, he died while on vacation on March 29, 2002. Leandro Muñoz took over the role intended for Rico.
- Sa Dulo ng Walang Hanggan is considered to be the first teleserye to change the genre that viewers have not yet encounter. The production team are the first to create a reincarnation or multiverse theme ever.
- Sa Dulo ng Walang Hanggan was also aired on ABS-CBN's local radio stations from 2001 to 2003 throughout its run. The radio version airs the episodes from the previous evening that have already aired, thus serving as a rerun.
- The two preceding series in the timeslot that the series was airing, Mula sa Puso and Saan Ka Man Naroroon, also had Claudine Barretto as the main protagonist.
- The stair scene where Sally (Mylene Dizon) fell onto the stair became one of the hit iconic scenes in TV history and viewers still remember and talk about it.
- Mylene Dizon was typecast as main antagonist and was recognized by many viewers as the one who made Claudine Barretto's life miserable.
- Claudine Barretto wore a necklace given to her by a fan as a sign of gratitude.
- Sa Dulo ng Walang Hanggan had a stellar cast and used Gladys Reyes while she was still casting in Recuerdo de Amor in 2002.
- In the 2002 film Super B, Rufa Mae Quinto's character screams at her nemesis, played by Mylene Dizon, "Dami mo nang ginawang kasalanan kay Claudine!" ("You already did so many sins against Claudine!") in reference to the character Sally in the TV Drama.
- Dianne Dela Fuente, fresh from the hit teleserye Pangako Sa 'Yo, replaced Carol Banawa as Minerva in the latter part of the series. Minerva wasn't seen again until the halfway through the series and by the time Minerva was needed, Carol Banawa was busy with her new teleserye Bituin.
- In a podcast, Ms. Keiko Aquino, one of the writer said that Sally was not really the planned to be Alfonso's reincarnation. They really planned to make viewers think who is the reincarnation of Alfonso.
- Sally's death in finale episode was an audience suggestion. The suggestions came from a dial since ABS-CBN make a dial promo about what audience want Sally to get her karma. Many viewers suggest that Sally must fall from a building and it was just chose of production team instead of the first plan that Sally will be electrified.
- Sa Dulo ng Walang Hanggan is considered to be one of the longest running teleserye of ABS-CBN until now and their second teleserye project after the first teleserye Pangako Sa'Yo.
- The series' theme song was used again for another teleserye called Walang Hanggan of ABS-CBN also. Helen Gamboa was also part of the series.
- This is the last television series of Ricky Belmonte, Don Laurel, Dennis Trillo (in ABS-CBN before moving on GMA) and Nestor de Villa. Belmonte died in 2001 but somehow, his character still have an exit through killing in 2002. Laurel is going to migrate in Canada with his family in 2002. So his character was decided to be killed and gave an exit.

== See also ==
- List of programs broadcast by ABS-CBN
- List of ABS-CBN Studios original drama series
