= Maligno (TV series) =

2008 Philippine television drama series

- Title card
- Genre: Drama, Horror, Suspense, Gothic Horror, Thriller
- Created by: ABS-CBN Studios; Celso Ad Castillo
- Based on: Maligno (1977) by Celso Ad. Castillo
- Directed by: Wenn Deramas
- Starring: Claudine Barretto; Diether Ocampo; Rafael Rosell
- Country of origin: Philippines
- Original language: Filipino
- No. of episodes: 20

Production
- Executive producers: Roldeo T. Endrinal; Joan Del Rosario
- Running time: 16-30 minutes
- Production company: Dreamscape Entertainment Television

Original release
- Network: ABS-CBN
- Release: April 28 – May 23, 2008

Maligno (transl. Evil One) is a 2008 Philippine television drama horror series broadcast by ABS-CBN. Based on a 1977 Philippine film of the same title, the series is the second instalment of Sineserye Presents: The Susan Roces Cinema Collection. Directed by Wenn Deramas, it stars Claudine Barretto, Diether Ocampo and Rafael Rosell. It aired on the network's Primetime Bida line up and worldwide on TFC from April 28 to May 23, 2008, replacing Palos and was replaced by My Girl.

This series is currently available on Jeepney TV's YouTube channel and iWant.

== Overview ==
=== Origin ===
It is based on 1977 film starring the Queen of Philippine Movies, Susan Roces, that won her second FAMAS Best Actress trophy. The 1977 movie was directed by Celso Ad. Castillo, who also wrote the original screenplay together with Dominador B. Mirasol.

The film stars included Dante Rivero, Celia Rodriguez, and Eddie Garcia. The film revolves about Angela after being impregnated by an evil spirit, she fears that her child will be the evil one's offspring.Besides that she and her family are hunted down by a cult and coven of satanists and witches attempting to rob her soul.

== Synopsis ==
=== The Chosen Carrier ===
After leaving her baby girl at a convent, Selya and her three companions die in succession while trying to escape a satanic cult. Later on, Selya's daughter is adopted by a wealthy but childless couple and is christened as Angela. However, her adoptive father never learns to love her and becomes even more distant when his wife dies during labor.

Despite her lonely childhood, Angela later becomes a successful newscaster. Her staff even throws a surprise party for her to celebrate the nomination of "Kulam"—a story featured in her news magazine show—for an Emmy Award. But instead of bursting out with joy, Angela is shaken by the news. As it happens, that particular episode makes her feel guilty because the woman who was accused of witchcraft in her scoop was later killed by her neighbors, leaving her daughter alone in the world.

Worse, her show will be reformatted and improved only on the condition that she makes a follow-up piece on the story. Still upset by these developments, she retires to her office for some peace and quiet, only to encounter a crazed man who is lusting after her. When she is about to call the guard for help, the man suddenly disappears. Angela quickly brushes the incident off as a hallucination. But when she arrives home, she discovers her maids are dead and she is raped by the devil himself.

=== The Cult ===
A Satanic cult and a coven is being emphasized in the story, the cult which comprised an elite group of dark witches and warlocks and satanists is believed to worship the devil and does everything their leader tells them, they also believe that the Time of the Birth is coming. The cult also altogether keeps the group a secret, in every supernatural serial killings that was believed to be done by the devil, they're the ones who clean up and make the atrocities appear like accidents.But in the finale after Angela makes a final effort in saving Angelo from the devil's curse the cult was completely destroyed and annihilated killing Lucas and the rest of his followers.

=== The Curse of the Son ===
The son Angela's been taking care of is believed to be carrying a curse: whoever tries to stop the destined life of the child or sometimes for no particular reason, the person dies.

List of deaths from the series that were related to the prophecy, Lucas, Angela, and Angelo.

Character	Cause of death	Episode
Max	A bus plows in him at a high speed, causing him to die.	Episode 1
Larry	Minutes after Max's death, Larry tries to run and hide away from the cult who is chasing them, he hid under a flatter machine which automatically turned on and flattens him.	Episode 1
Gladya	In fear, Gladya tries to kill herself by standing in a train railing but the train turns left and skipped her. Unfortunately, a "cross sign" nearby fell and impaled her in the head.	Episode 1
The Cortez's unborn son	Precisely, the family who adopted Angela had a baby but on the birth time, the baby was dead when born.	Episode 1
Mrs. Cortez	Died after childbirth	Episode 1
Eliza's mother	Murdered by the cult after accusing her of witchcraft	Episode 1
Angela's maids	It was believed that before Lucas raped Angela, he killed all her maids first.	Episode 1
Marissa	Angela's supervisor while she was going home from work, she took the elevator but accidentally the elevator wiring cut off causing it to fall to the bottom floor and kill her.	Episode 4
The Paparazzi	Found dead according to the local newspapers.	Episode 5
Dra. Elena Castillo	Angela's OB-gyn. She was killed when she was bit by a venomous snake. When the cult had reached the spot where the doctor's car was found, they pushed the car into the steep ground, carried the doctor by placing her inside the car and then crashed the car and the doctor into the ravine.	Episode 5
The Priest	He was supposed to christen Angelo but was found dead inside a cabinet on the same day.	Episode 6
Belen - The first nanny	Decapitated by a clothesline while she tried to run away from the devil.	Episode 7
The Bullies' mother	Body contorted by Lucas	Episode 10
		Episode 12
		Episode 12
The Chaffeur	Mysteriously dies in the car	Episode 19
Joaquin Valderrama	Stabbed in the back by SPO2 Damien Dumlao with a dagger.	Episode 20
Hector Salcedo	Impaled in the back by a flying knife after failing to kill Angela at the ceremony site.	Episode 20
Lucas Santander	Stabbed in the back by Angela with a dagger causing him and the entire cult perish and reduced to ashes.	Episode 20

== Cast and characters ==
=== Main cast ===
Cast	Character	Summary
Claudine Barretto	Angela Cortez	A well-known newscaster, Angela is a host of A-List, a popular news show. She didn't know she is chosen to give birth to a demon child and although she tries to escape, destiny catches up with Angela who only then realizes that her son is doomed to become a satanic cult's chosen one but in the ending she successfully kills Lucas causing the rest of the Cult to perish and be destroyed.
Diether Ocampo	Hector Salcedo	Hector is Angela's son's pediatrician, Angela and him met since before the baby was born, Hector suspects that the baby Angela is carrying brings a curse to everyone who hurts his career, even though he knows this he'll do anything to save Angela from being part of this cult.
Rafael Rosell	Lucas Satander	A strange painter who is obsessed with Angela (Claudine). As Lucas Santander, he turns out to be the man destined in a prophecy to be the father of the devil's son. In the end he is successfully stabbed by Angela as the lunar eclipse reaches its termination, destroying the entire Satanic Cult and thus putting an end to his reign of terror and his atrocities.

=== Supporting cast ===
Cast	Character	Summary
Kim Chiu	Eliza Catacutan	An ambitious production assistant who goes up the ranks as a reporter to seek revenge on Angela due to her mother's death on the "Kulam" expose.
Gerald Anderson	Joaquin Valderrama	Eliza's camera man and close friend, soon to be a love interest.
Carlo Lacana	Angelo Cortez	The birth child of Angela Cortez, some characters suspect that the child was a son of the devil. It was believed that Angela was just chosen to resurrect him into this world and spread the darkness within. In the end he is finally set free from his demonic destiny.
Arlene Tolibas	Lagring	A creepy nanny who takes care of the child. Arlene Tolibas' character was supposed to be played by Eugene Domingo.
DJ Durano	SPO2 Damien Dumlao	A policeman who was believed to be a traitor and a member of the cult who worships Satan. It was said that he frames the deaths of people to cover-up the cult. At the end he begins to collapse to death along with the entire Satanic Cult due to the death of Lucas.
Empoy Marquez	Charlie	The gay best friend of Angela, he is always there every time Angela needs him, even though he's always near Angela's, it seems he's not being cursed by the child to death.

=== Guest cast ===
- Susan Roces as Introducer
- Debraliz as Elena Castillo
- Rio Locsin as Selya
- Susan Africa as Gladya

== DVD release ==
A DVD containing all 20 episodes of Maligno was released by Star Home Video on June 20, 2008.

== See also ==
- List of programs broadcast by ABS-CBN
- Sineserye Presents
