= Diether Ocampo =

Filipino actor

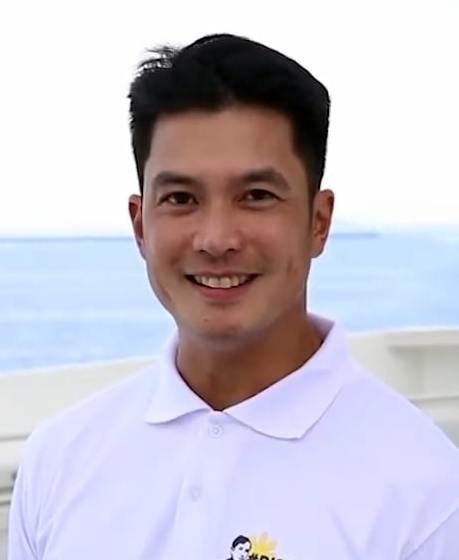
- Ocampo in 2021
- Born: Diether Pascual Ocampo; July 19, 1973 (age 53); Bacoor, Cavite, Philippines
- Occupations: Actor, singer, model, comedian
- Years active: 1993–present
- Agent: Star Magic
- Spouse: Kristine Hermosa (m. 2004; ann. 2009)
- Children: Dream Ocampo
- Military career
- Allegiance: Philippines
- Branch: Philippine Coast Guard Auxiliary
- Service years: 2019–present
- Rank: Captain (CAPT)

Diether Pascual Ocampo (born July 19, 1973) is a Filipino actor, singer, model and comedian.

== Background ==
Diether Pascual Ocampo was born on July 19, 1973 in Barangay Aniban, Bacoor, Cavite, where he attended school. He attended De La Salle University – Dasmariñas. He is of Filipino-German ancestry.

He began as a dancer before being discovered by ABS-CBN in the mid-1990s. He is part of the band Blow under the stage name “Capt. Mongrel”. In 2001, he was an executive producer for The Pin-Ups debut album, Hello Pain, that enabled the band to become the first Philippines-based band to be signed to a U.S. label.

Ocampo started with ABS-CBN and being managed by Star Magic headed by Johnny Manahan. He auditioned for ABS-CBN's talent search in 1995. A year and a half later, he became one of the members of Star Circle Batch II. His first movie appearance was in the movie adaptation of teen program Ang TV. He is active in charitable works through his K.I.D.S. (Kabataan Inyong Dapat Suportahan, “Youth you must support”) Foundation to help underprivileged children in Metro Manila.

In 2016, he starred in TV5's series Bakit Manipis ang Ulap? together with Cesar Montano and Claudine Barretto.

In 2017, after a brief break from showbusiness, Ocampo returned as a freelancer.

Ocampo is an enlisted member of the Philippine Coast Guard Auxiliary, with the rank of Captain.

== Other ==
In 2007, Ocampo starred in an anti-zoo ad for PETA-Asia Pacific.

== Personal life ==
Ocampo was married to Kristine Hermosa on September 21, 2004. Their marriage was later annulled on January 30, 2009. With a former non-showbiz partner, he has one son, Dream.

== Filmography ==
=== Film ===
| Year | Title | Role |
|---|---|---|
| 1997 | Calvento Files: The Movie | Rodolfo |
| 1998 | Dahil Mahal Na Mahal Kita | Ryan |
| 1998 | Magandang Hatinggabi | Louie |
| 1999 | Bakit Pa? | Joseph |
| 1999 | Mula sa Puso: The Movie | Michael Miranda |
| 1999 | Gimik: The Reunion | Gary Ballesteros |
| 1999 | Soltera | Eric Robles |
| 2000 | Bukas Na Lang Kita Mamahalin | Jimboy |
| 2000 | Gusto Ko ng Lumigaya | Leo |
| 2001 | La Vida Rosa | Dado |
| 2001 | Ano Bang Meron Ka? | Jason |
| 2002 | Jologs | Mando |
| 2002 | Bahid | Rodney |
| 2004 | Volta | Atty. Lloyd Falcon |
| 2004 | Bcuz of U | RJ |
| 2005 | Nasaan Ka Man | Ito |
| 2010 | Mamarazzi | Carlo |
| 2010 | Sa 'Yo Lamang | Paul |
| 2010 | Slow Fade | Darius |
| 2010 | Dalaw | Anton |
| 2011 | Rakenrol | Jacci Rocca |
| 2012 | 24/7 in Love | Ken Ramirez |
| 2020 | Sunday Night Fever | Mikey |
| 2023 | Martyr or Murderer | Sebastian Duterte |

=== Television / Digital series ===
| Year | Title | Role |
|---|---|---|
| 1993–2001 | Star Drama Presents | |
| 1995–2016 | ASAP | Host/himself |
| 1996–1999 | Super Laff-In | Host/himself |
| 1996–1999 | Gimik | Gary Ballesteros |
| 1996 | Flames: Forevermore | |
| 1996 | 1896 | |
| 1997 | !Oka Tokat | Benjamin "Benj" Catacutan |
| 1997–1999 | Mula sa Puso | Michael Miranda |
| 1999–2001 | Saan Ka Man Naroroon | Bart |
| 2001–2003 | Recuerdo de Amor | Paulo Jose Villafuerte |
| 2003–2004 | Buttercup | Winston Go |
| 2003–2004 | Sana'y Wala Nang Wakas | Leonardo Madrigal |
| 2004 | Marina | Prinsipe Lirio |
| 2005 | 'Til Death Do Us Part | Manuel |
| 2005–2006 | Bora: Sons of the Beach | Ditoy |
| 2005 | Ikaw ang Lahat sa Akin | Ivan Ynares |
| 2006 | Komiks Presents: Bampy | Pido |
| 2006 | Star Magic Presents: Windows to the Heart | Dennis |
| 2006 | Komiks Presents: Bahay ng Lagim | |
| 2006 | Star Magic Presents: The Game of Love | Gary |
| 2007 | Love Spell Presents: Click na Click | Josh Velasco |
| 2007 | Sineserye Presents: Palimos ng Pag-ibig | Rodel Alcaraz |
| 2007 | Rounin | Master Cadmus |
| 2007 | Maalaala Mo Kaya: Blue Rose | Lester |
| 2007 | Margarita | Bernard Beltran |
| 2007 | Princess Sarah | Master Brandon Crissford |
| 2008 | Lobo | Lorenzo Blancaflor |
| 2008 | Sineserye Presents: Maligno | Hector Salcedo |
| 2008 | Iisa Pa Lamang | Miguel Castillejos |
| 2008 | Maalaala Mo Kaya: Robot | Alex |
| 2009 | Only You | Jonathan Sembrano |
| 2009 | Maalaala Mo Kaya: Lambat | Mang Piyo |
| 2010 | Rubi | Hector Ferrer |
| 2010 | Your Song: Gimik 2010 | Gregorio "Gary" Ballesteros |
| 2010–2011 | Sabel | Frederico "Eric" Zaragosa |
| 2011 | Guns and Roses | Marcus Aguilar |
| 2011 | Gandang Gabi, Vice! | Himself/Guest |
| 2012 | Maalaala Mo Kaya: Singsing | Joel Villanueva |
| 2013 | Apoy sa Dagat | Anton Lamayre |
| 2014 | Maalaala Mo Kaya: Bukid | Ronnie |
| 2016 | Bakit Manipis ang Ulap? | George Bustamante |
| 2017 | Unang Hirit | Himself/Guest |
| 2017 | Magpakailanman: My Breastfeeding Dad | Anton Ramos |
| 2017 | Tonight with Arnold Clavio | Himself/Guest |
| 2017 | Celebrity Bluff | Himself/Contestant |
| 2018 | ASAP Natin 'To | Himself / Host / Performer |
| 2018 | Bagani | Apo |
| 2019 | It's Showtime | Himself / Guest Hurado |
| 2021 | Huwag Kang Mangamba | Samuel Cordero |
| 2022–2023 | The Iron Heart | Echo Madrigal |
| 2023 | Korina Interviews | Himself / guest |

== Awards and nominations ==
| Year | Movie/TV Show | Category | Organization | Results | Source |
|---|---|---|---|---|---|
| 2013 | First Gintong Palad Public Service Awards | Service Awardee | Movie Writers Welfare Foundation | | |
| 2013 | 15 Hottest Leading Men | 15 Hottest Leading Men Awardee | Metro's Celebrity 2013 | | |
| 2012 | Star Magic Ball 2012 | Star Magic Icons Award | Star Magic | | |
| 2011 | Star Magic Ball 2011 | Star Magic Most Stylish Male | Star Magic | | |
| 2011 | Hottest Actor (Male Stars) | 2011 Yahoo! OMG! Awards | Yahoo! Philippines | Nominated | |
| 2010 | Philippine Walk of Fame | Walk of Fame Awardee | Mowell Foundland Foundation | | |
| 2010 | Organizer of K.I.D.S. Foundation | Dangal ng PASADO (PASADO Lifetime Award) | 12th Pampelikulang Samahan ng mga Dalubguro Gawad PASADO Awards | Won | |
| 2009 | Maalaala Mo Kaya; Episode: "Lambat" | Nominated: Best Single Performance by an Actor | 23rd PMPC Star Awards for TV | Nominated | |
| 2009 | Iisa Pa Lamang | Nominated: Best Drama Actor | 23rd PMPC Star Awards for TV | Nominated | |
| 2008 | Organizer of K.I.D.S. Foundation | Metro Him Awardee | Metro Him Awardee 2008 | | |
| 2007 | Sineserye Presents: Palimos ng Pag-ibig | Nominated: Best Drama Actor | 21st PMPC Star Awards for TV | Nominated | |
| 2006 | Ikaw ang Lahat sa Akin | Winner: Best Drama Actor | 20th PMPC Star Awards for TV | Won | |
| 2006 | Nasaan Ka Man | Winner: Best Supporting Actor | Gawad TANGLAW Awards | Won | |
| 2006 | Nasaan Ka Man | Nominated: Best Performance by Male or Female, Adult or Child, Individual or Ensemble in Leading or Supporting Role | Young Critics Circle (Philippines) | Nominated | |
| 2006 | Nasaan Ka Man | Nominated: Best Supporting Actor | 8th Pampelikulang Samahan ng mga Dalubguro Gawad PASADO Awards | Nominated | |
| 2005 | Sana'y Wala Nang Wakas | Best Drama Actor | 19th PMPC Star Awards for TV | Nominated | |
| 2004 | Sana'y Wala Nang Wakas | Winner: Best Drama Actor | Gawad America Awards | Won | |
| 2004 | Sana'y Wala Nang Wakas | Winner: Best Drama Actor | 18th PMPC Star Awards for TV | Won | |
| 2002 | Recuerdo de Amor | Nominated: Best Drama Actor | 2002 PMPC Star Awards for TV | Nominated | |
| 2002 | La Vida Rosa | Nominated: Best Actor | 25th Manunuri ng Pelikulang Pilipino Gawad Urian | Nominated | |
| 2002 | La Vida Rosa | Nominated: Best Actor | 20th Film Academy of the Philippines (FAP) Luna Awards | Nominated | |
| 2002 | The Hunks | Most Promising Group (The Hunks) | Guillermo Memorial Mendoza Scholarship Foundation | Won | |
| 1999 | | Brightest Star of 1999 (14) | Movie Magazine: Brightest Star of 1999 | | |
| 1999 | | Outstanding Filipino Achiever for Business and Industry | Philippine Bantayog Jaycees | | |
