= Saan Ka Man Naroroon =

1999–2001 Philippine television drama series

- Title card
- Genre: Drama; Musical; Romance
- Created by: ABS-CBN Studios
- Written by: Keiko Aquino-Galvez; Rondel Lindayag
- Directed by: Wenn V. Deramas
- Creative director: Ricky Lee
- Starring: Claudine Barretto
- Theme music composer: Levi Celerio and Restie Umali
- Ending theme: "Saan Ka Man Naroroon" by Carol Banawa and Dessa
- Country of origin: Philippines
- Original language: Filipino
- No. of seasons: 2
- No. of episodes: 510

Production
- Executive producers: Michael Francis Muñoz; Mae Santos
- Editors: Rachel Aguilos; Hazel B. Parfan
- Running time: 20-27 minutes
- Production company: Dreamscape Entertainment Television

Original release
- Network: ABS-CBN
- Release: April 12, 1999 – March 23, 2001

Saan Ka Man Naroroon (international title: Wherever You Are) is a Philippine television drama series broadcast by ABS-CBN. Directed by Wenn V. Deramas, starring Claudine Barretto in the title role. It aired on the network's evening line up from April 12, 1999 to March 23, 2001, replacing Mula sa Puso and was replaced by Sa Dulo ng Walang Hanggan.

This series is currently available on Jeepney TV's YouTube Channel (Some of the episodes are missing or not published).

== Premise ==
A storm occurs on the night when Dolores is about to give birth, threatening to completely ruin their livelihood. Her husband Juancho is forced to leave her in the incapable hands of her sister, Violeta. Dolores gives birth to the triplets Rosario, Rosenda, Rosemarie. However, Arsenio, Dolores' former lover, is the attending physician, and he takes the youngest triplet, Rosita due to his bitterness and resentment. He convinces Dolores and Juancho that Rosita died at birth, and then raises Rose Marie abroad where she remains ignorant of her true origins and becomes very sophisticated.

As the years pass, rivalry arises between the remaining twins. Rosario grows up to be charming and sweet but unhealthy, and her parents give her a lot of attention. Rosenda therefore grows very jealous of Rosario, as well as self-centered and scheming. Following a confrontation between the twins, Rosario drowns, convincing her parents that they have already lost her. Unbeknownst to them, however, she has been found at the bay shore by a kind-hearted couple who raise her as their own.

From then on the three sisters live separately, unaware of each other's existence until they rediscover each other at the expense of their family's well-kept secret and long-forgotten sins.

== Cast and characters ==
=== Main Cast ===
- Claudine Barretto portrays three roles:
  - Rosario S. Ocampo - Pineda / Rosario de Villa / Rose Anne (Main Protagonist) - The singer one. The adopted daughter of Cleotilde and Ben when she was found floating in the ocean unconscious. The lover of Daniel and later his husband. She is known as the sweetest and the kind among her sisters. She loves music and to sing. She may know for her good personality but also will fight for herself when time of abuse.
  - Rosenda S. Ocampo - Campos (Main antagonist / Anti-heroine) - The evil one. She was the unwanted wife of Bart before but later will accept by him. She was the lucky one to solo her parent after her two siblings disappear on her sight until they shown again. She is acknowledge to be the evil to her siblings by the influenced of her aunt Violeta but later soon she will make a big changes in her life.
  - Rosita S. Ocampo / Rosemarie Madrigal (main protagonist) - The balanced one. The adopted daughter of Arsenio and Aurora and the adoptive niece of Lilia when Arsenio took her over on Dolores while giving birth. She was known for not so being good and also not so being bad person. She can show kindness to a person when its kind too and bad personality if the person was also bad.

=== Supporting Cast ===
- Rico Yan as Daniel Pineda - The childhood friend of Rosario and Rosenda. He was the son of Mang Tino that blames him for the loss his mother. He became the lover of Rosario and later to be her husband. He was also considered as a saviour by Rosario and Rosemarie against danger situations.
- Diether Ocampo as Bartolome "Bart" Campos - He was the son of Gloria and Dominador. The childhood friend of Rosario when she was bring at province after her rescue. He was the wife of Rosenda that he cannot accept but later he did.
- Leandro Muñoz as Joshua
- Carlos Agassi as Richard Rivera †
- Gladys Reyes as Melissa Baldamesa-Ocampo (Main Antagonist) †
- Eric Quizon as Juancho Ocampo
- Cherry Pie Picache as Dolores Sarmeniego-Ocampo
- Jackie Lou Blanco as Violeta Sarmeniego-Antonino (Antagonist) †
- Isabel Rivas as Marilou Campos (Antagonist)
- Candy Pangilinan as Jengky
- Mylene Dizon as Karen
- Sharmaine Arnaiz as Marietta Cabrera †
- Kier Legaspi as Delyo †
- Janice de Belen as Margarita Javier
- Joel Torre as Juanito Ocampo †
- Rustom Padilla as Alex
- Juan Rodrigo as Dominador "Domeng" Campos
- Susan Africa as Gloria Campos
- Nonie Buencamino as Arsenio Madrigal
- Vivian Foz as Lilia Madrigal
- Shamaine Centenera-Buencamino as Aurora Madrigal †
- Ariel Rivera as Dr. Angelo Cabrera
- Mark Gil as Edward Rivera
- Fanny Serrano as Marlo Javier

=== Recurring cast ===
- Charlie Davao± as Francisco Sarmeniego +
- Augusto Victa † as Ben De Villa
- Rey Ventura as Mang Tino
- Spencer Reyes as Itoy
- Alma Lerma as Yaya Nieves
- Lara Fabregas as Clarissa Monteverde±
- Don Laurel as Arthur
- Debraliz as Zeny †
- Dennis Roldan as Greg
- Andrei Felix as Mong
- Matthew Umali as Alfred
- Carlos Morales as Banjo
- Jay Manalo as Kano
- Allen Dizon as Rollie
- Karla Estrada as Lilay
- Andoy Ranay as Hazel
- Angelo Caangay as Gio
- Jet Alcantara as Carl
- Nap Miranda as Dennis
- Roderick Lindayag as Dolfo †

=== Guest Cast ===
- Katrina and Bianca Aguila as Young Rosenda and Young Rosario
- Alwyn Uytingco as Young Daniel
- Eugene Domingo as Patricia Sta. Cruz (News Reporter)
- Malou de Guzman as Encar
- Boy Abunda as himself, hosting for Rosario and Richard's interview
- Anita Linda± as Aling Tasing
- Gerard Pizzaras as Arman

=== Special Participants ===
- Gina Pareño as Maria Jovita "Marita" Sarmeniego †
- Caridad Sanchez as Cleotilde De Villa
- Boots Anson-Roa as Amparo
- Rosa Rosal as Sor Cecilia
- Jennifer Sevilla as Sister Paula
- Lilia Cuntapay as Upeng

== Ratings ==
Saan Ka Man Naroroon got its rating of 46.8%. It is ranked 8th place (on ABS-CBN's 10 ranked rated teleseryes) on AGB Nielsen's list of Top Rated Teleseryes.

== Trivia about this soap opera ==
- Saan Ka Man Naroroon is considered to be one of the top rated and longest running soap opera of ABS-CBN until now.
- According to Claudine Barretto in a talk show Showbiz Pa More!, Saan Ka Man Naroroon was the easiest soap opera that they made with the director and production team. She also said that every tapings end early.
- Claudine Barretto is considered to be the first actress to portray three roles in a soap opera in TV history.
- Piolo Pascual was first tapped to play one of the leading men characters. Piolo revealed that why he didn't go through the role because the manager of Judy Ann Santos said Juday and Piolo was still a love team in that time so he cannot portray the role and the role just given to Carlos Agussi.
- In a podcast, Ms. Keiko Aquino, one of the writer shared that the bangin scene from episode 3 & 496 was inspired to the 1982 film Sophie's Choice.

== Reruns ==
It was first rerun on Cinema One, second rerun of the soap opera is on Jeepney TV, starting 2022 until 2024. It is the first time of Jeepney TV to rerun the soap opera.

At January 9 until November 4, 2024, it streams on Jeepney TV's YouTube Channel at this time. They are premiering 2 episodes everyday at a 1:00 PM slot (but there's a rare times that more of 2 episodes are premiering in a day) replacing Marinella and was replaced by Sa Sandaling Kailangan Mo Ako. Some of the episodes aren't available or not make it to be published until now.

The show was rerun again for the third time. It rerun on Kapamilya Online Live every Saturdays & Sundays in the timeslot of 10:00 AM and Jeepney TV at the same time starting on January 24, 2026. This was the first time of Kapamilya Online Live and the second time of Jeepney TV to rerun the soap opera.
