= Soltera (film) =

1999 drama film by Jerry Lopez Sineneng

- Restored movie poster
- Directed by: Jerry Lopez Sineneng
- Screenplay by: Jun Lana; Jerry Lopez Sineneng
- Story by: Jun Lana
- Produced by: Malou N. Santos
- Starring: Maricel Soriano; Claudine Barretto; Diether Ocampo
- Cinematography: Joe Batac
- Edited by: Marya Ignacio
- Music by: Jessie Lasaten
- Production company: Star Cinema
- Distributed by: Star Cinema
- Release date: 28 July 1999
- Running time: 120 minutes
- Country: Philippines
- Language: Filipino

Soltera is a 1999 Filipino romantic drama film directed by Jerry Lopez Sineneng and co-written by Jun Lana. Starring Claudine Barretto, Diether Ocampo, and Maricel Soriano, the story follows a lonely and single wedding planner who decides to start a relationship with a younger man, but this relationship leads to complications when the latter draws his attention to his lover's assistant.

Produced and distributed by Star Cinema, the film was released theatrically on 28 July 1999. In 2021, it was digitally restored and remastered by ABS-CBN Film Restoration, in association with Central Digital Lab.

== Plot ==
Sandra is a wedding planner, and her sisters, Lorraine and Bessie, are now married. On her sister Cathy's wedding day, she met a young real estate agent named Eric Robles. With the help of Sandra's gay friend Jojo, Sandra and Eric began a budding relationship, despite their age difference and shared living situation. However, Sandra's family disagrees with Eric because he is too young for her. Eric eventually became close to Sandra's employee, Lisa. When Sandra decided to travel to the United States, Eric confessed to Lisa that he loves her, but Lisa rejects the former's love as inappropriate. When Sandra returned, she loved Eric even more, but she would learn about Eric and Lisa's relationship. This causes Lisa to resign from her job and Eric to be expelled. Sandra then told Jojo that she is pregnant but has become depressed as a result of Eric's abandonment. Eric returned and asked Sandra for forgiveness, which she accepted. Sandra also assured Eric that he would not deprive her child of him, and that she could be content alone.

== Cast ==
- Maricel Soriano as Sandra Valdez
- Diether Ocampo as Enrico "Eric" Robles
- Claudine Barretto as Liza
- Raymond Bagatsing as Jojo Morales
- Nida Blanca† as Sandra's mother
- Rita Avila as Lorraine
- Maila Gumila as Bessie
- Julia Clarete as Cathy
- Ino Sevilla as Cathy's husband
- Alicia Alonzo as Liza's mother
- Miguel dela Rosa as Edwin
- Don Laurel as Abdon
- Donnie Fernandez as Ruel
- Mel Kimura as Mel
- Edu Manzano as Arthur
- Marlon Alvaro as Gab Bully
- Cedric Nicomedes as Mark
- Albert Zialcita as Ninong Louie

== Reception ==
=== Accolades ===
Award-giving organization	Date	Category	Recipient(s)	Result	Ref.
18th FAP Awards	31 March 2000	Best Picture	Soltera	Nominated	
18th FAP Awards	31 March 2000	Best Actress	Maricel Soriano	Nominated	
18th FAP Awards	31 March 2000	Best Supporting Actor	Raymond Bagatsing	Won	
18th FAP Awards	31 March 2000	Best Supporting Actress	Claudine Barretto	Nominated	
18th FAP Awards	31 March 2000	Best Director	Jerry Lopez Sineneng	Nominated	
18th FAP Awards	31 March 2000	Best Screenplay	Jun Lana and Jerry Lopez Sineneng	Nominated	
18th FAP Awards	31 March 2000	Best Cinematography	Jose Batac Jr.	Nominated	
18th FAP Awards	31 March 2000	Best Sound	Joe Climaco	Nominated	
23rd FAMAS Awards	7 April 2000	Best Picture	Soltera	Nominated	
23rd FAMAS Awards	7 April 2000	Best Actress	Maricel Soriano	Nominated	
23rd FAMAS Awards	7 April 2000	Best Supporting Actor	Raymond Bagatsing	Won	
23rd FAMAS Awards	7 April 2000	Best Director	Jerry Lopez Sineneng	Nominated	
23rd FAMAS Awards	7 April 2000	Best Screenplay	Jun Lana and Jerry Lopez Sineneng	Won	
23rd FAMAS Awards	7 April 2000	Best Theme Song	"Di Ko Kaya" by Jake Nicdao	Nominated	
