= Mula sa Puso =

1997–99 Philippine television action drama series

- Title card
- Also known as: From the Heart
- Genre: Drama; Action; Romance
- Created by: ABS-CBN Studios
- Written by: Keiko Aquino; Rondel Lindayag
- Directed by: Wenn Deramas; Khryss Adalia; Ruel S. Bayani
- Creative director: Deo Endrinal
- Starring: Claudine Barretto; Rico Yan
- Theme music composer: Vehnee Saturno (arranged by Tito Cayamanda)
- Ending theme: "Mula sa Puso" by Jude Michael
- Country of origin: Philippines
- Original language: Filipino
- No. of episodes: 539

Production
- Executive producer: Michael Francis Muñoz
- Production locations: Metro Manila, Philippines
- Editors: Ben Panaligan; Rachel Aguilos; Odinthor Lazatin
- Running time: 14-29 minutes
- Production company: Dreamscape Entertainment

Original release
- Network: ABS-CBN
- Release: March 10, 1997 – April 9, 1999

Related
- Mula sa Puso (2011)

Mula sa Puso (international title: From the Heart) is a Philippine television drama action romance series broadcast by ABS-CBN. Directed by Wenn Deramas, Ruel S. Bayani and Khryss Adalia, starring Claudine Barretto, Rico Yan and Diether Ocampo. It aired on the network's evening line up from March 10, 1997 until April 9, 1999, replacing Maria Mercedes and was replaced by Saan Ka Man Naroroon.

A 2011 remake, starring Lauren Young, JM de Guzman and Enrique Gil, aired on ABS-CBN in 2011.

The series is currently streaming online for the second time on Jeepney TV's YouTube channel at the timeslot of 1:00 PM and 1:30 PM replacing Sa Dulo ng Walang Hanggan.

== Plot ==
Via (Claudine Barretto), the only daughter of Don Fernando (Juan Rodrigo), was raised as his darling princess. On her eighteenth birthday, she found out that her father has promised her hand in marriage to her childhood friend, Michael (Diether Ocampo), and before the birthday party was over, she got kidnapped. She was rescued by a good Samaritan named Gabriel (Rico Yan), whom she fell in love with. Michael, at the latter part of the story, became romantically involved with Via's best friend, Trina (Rica Peralejo). As the story unfolds, Via ended up having to decide between the two men in her life, while learning more about her mother Magda (Jaclyn Jose) and fighting off her evil aunt Selina (Princess Punzalan).

In the story, Selina was one of the most influential characters, due to her desire to acquire the power and wealth of Don Fernando, her brother. She possesses intelligence in illegal tactics that made her stronger and she used people in order to manipulate them when a bus bombing in the departure of Via and her family to start a new life began. Via lived a new identity but came back to her family, and they all faced Selina one last time in dignity and Via restored peace in her family.

== Cast and characters ==
=== Main cast ===
- Claudine Barretto as Olivia "Via" Pereira-Maglayon / Ella Peralta - She is also the lover of Gabriel until the time they got married. The daughter of Don Fernando and Magda. She will become a successor of Don Fernando's wealth when the right time comes while her aunt Selina's evil plan is to take it over.
- Rico Yan† as Gabriel Maglayon - The lover of Via and also his husband when they got married. The son of Don Ricardo and young brother of Leo. He was adopted by Magda when he was abandond by his own father. He grew up with his younger brother Warren along with Nay Magda in a little house.

=== Main antagonist ===
- Princess Punzalan as Selina Pereira-Matias - The evil aunt of Via who will take over the wealth of Don Fernando that will be inherit of Via. Don Fernando's half sibling, the mother of Nicole and wife of Ysmael and also his partner on evil plans.

=== Supporting cast ===
- Jaclyn Jose† as Magdalena "Magda" Magbanua-Pereira - The biological mother of Via and the adoptive mother of Gabriel and Warren. She was once the lover of Don Fernando while he was already has a wife but later on they reconcile and married again.
- Diether Ocampo as Michael Miranda - The son of Pining and adopted son of Rogelio. He once loved Via and later they became lovers at each other. Later on, he met Trina that became his wife.
- Patrick Garcia as Warren Bermudez-Arcanghel - The biological son of Corazon. He was adoptive son of Magda starting when his brother Gabriel got him at Boys Town.
- Shaina Magdayao as Jennifer Matias - The daughter of Connie and Ysmael. She was once hated by her half-sister Nicole but soon they became good sisters at each other.
- Rica Peralejo as Katrina "Trina" Alfonso-Miranda
- Juan Rodrigo as Don Fernando Pereira - The strict father of Via and ex-lover of Magda that soon they became married couple.
- Rio Locsin as Corazon Asuncion-Rodrigo - She is the biological mother of Warren and Tonton and the wife of Edward. She leave behind Warren for a while at Tatay Mario's nurture.
- Ricky Davao† as Edward Rodrigo - The husband of Corazon, the father of Tonton and stepfather of Warren. He abuses Warren sometimes with his son Tonton.
- Eric Quizon as Manuel Magbanua
- Efren Reyes Jr. as Ysmael Matias - The husband of evil Selina and the father of Gilbert, Nicole and Jennifer. He was also the partners in crime of Selina but soon got his conscience of what are they doing.
- Ariel Rivera as Raphael Buencamino

=== Recurring cast ===
- Anne Villegas as Matilde "Tindeng" Solano
- Ricardo Cepeda as Armando "Abdon" Macasaet
- Lee Robin Salazar as Leo Maglayon
- Lailani Navarro as Winnie Bermudez
- Jan Marini Alano as Mariel Solano
- Eva Darren as Josefina "Pining" Miranda
- Michael "Eagle" Riggs as Roxee
- Candy Pangilinan as Berta
- Lawrence David as Lando
- Gerald Pizzaras as Neal
- Stefano Mori as Anton "Tonton" Bermudez-Rodrigo
- Arman de Guzman as Gerry
- Ramil Rodriguez† as Atty. Rogelio Miranda
- Paula Peralejo as Joie Madrigal
- Anna Larrucea as Nicole Pereira-Matias
- Via Veloso as Wendy
- Mark Gil† as Eduardo "Bagyo" Bugayon
- Jay Manalo as Gilbert Matias
- Don Laurel as Jeffrey
- Gino Paul Guzman as Ronald
- Erika Fife as Cindy
- Raymond Bagatsing as Nardo
- Tess Dumpit as Atty. Regalado's doctor
- Ena Garcia as Anabelle

=== Special participants ===
- Snooky Serna as Criselda V. Pereira
- Charito Solis† as Agnes Bermudez-Delgado
- Charlie Davao† as Don Ricardo Maglayon
- Janice de Belen as Cornelia "Connie" Andrada
- Gina Alajar as Elena
- Maricel Laxa as Atty. Elaine Regalado
- Nida Blanca† as Carmen Buencamino
- Ronaldo Valdez† as Benjamin Arcanghel
- Cherry Pie Picache as Shirley Mercado
- Gardo Versoza as Domingo

=== Guest cast ===
- Ricky Rivero
- Raquel Villavicencio as Attorney
- Ray Ventura as Mario Reyes
- Luz Fernandez† as Judge
- Epy Quizon as teen Manuel Magbanua
- Judy Ann Santos as Esperanza (crossover character from Esperanza)
- Kaye Abad as Glenda Corpuz
- Rene Pangilinan as Michael's surgeon
- Eugene Domingo as Celia

== Reception ==
=== Soundtrack ===
The series title was based on the theme song, which was sung by Jude Michael and composed by Vehnee Saturno as the original acoustic version on television from PolyCosmic Records in 1997. Roselle Nava sang the movie version in 1999. The song was re-released in 2010 as part of 60 Taon ng Musika at Soap Opera. In 2011, for the remake used a version by Jovit Baldivino. Zsa Zsa Padilla's version from 1987 is used as well often in the series.

== Trivia about this soap opera ==
=== Ratings ===
The series became consistent in its story plot so it was well received by the public. Its pilot episode in 1997 was 37.9%, the highest rating was 53.7% in 1998, while the average was 45.2%. Ratings are provided by AGB Nielsen Philippines.

- Mula sa Puso was the first biggest break of Claudine Barretto to be acknowledge as a talented actress during in her start of making soap operas.
- Princess Punzalan's remarkable performance as an iconic antagonist/kontrabida role Selina is one of the most hated kontrabida of many viewers that will never forget until today in TV history.
- Mula sa Puso is also known for its iconic hit scene during in 1998, the Bus Explosion where Via (Claudine Barretto) is in there that many viewer believed that Via died inside the bus. This scene caught the attention of many viewers that lead Selina (Princess Punzalan) to be more hated of many viewers. In this era, viewers started calling the soap 'MSP', household name for Mula sa Puso. The episode got its ratings at the range of 70-75%.
- In the bus explosion in a particular episode that became iconic hit scene, the bus have its name "WVD Transit" that the WVD stands for Wenn V. Deramas.
- The love team of Claudine Barretto and Rico Yan here was also recognized by many viewers that they are up on this love team and became popular in the Philippines until now. The team-up of Claudine and Rico turns into a real-life relationship during this soap that their love team got its household name 'RYCB' (Stands for Rico Yan and Claudine Barretto). The love-triangle of Claudine Barretto, Rico Yan and Diether Ocampo also accepted by many viewers.
- Mula sa Puso is considered to be one of the highest rated and longest running soap opera of ABS-CBN until now.
- The premiere of the series coincides with Julia Barretto‘s birthdate, 10 March 1997, which is the niece of Claudine Barretto.
- This is the last soap opera of Charito Solis. She died in 1998 that in a particular episode, the cast of Mula sa Puso give tribute for her.

== Film ==
The film version of Mula sa Puso was released on February 10, 1999.

=== Differences between the series and the movie ===
- Jennifer (Shaina Magdayao) and Connie (Janice de Belen) were introduced early in the series, with Jennifer being Ysmael and Connie's daughter. However, the movie version did not include either character.
- Criselda, Via's late stepmother, was played by Snooky Serna in the series and by Eula Valdes in the movie. Valdes later portrayed Selina in the remake.
- In the series, Ysmael (Efren Reyes Jr.), Selina's husband, is always manipulated by her. However, in the movie, they are portrayed as equal partners who plot together against Via and Don Fernando.
- Elena (Gina Alajar) was hired by Selina and Ysmael to pretend to be Via's mother, but the movie did not feature that character.
- Nicole (Anna Larrucea) was shot and killed in both the movie and the series, but by different people: Manuel (Eric Quizon) in the series and Abdon (Carlos Morales) in the movie. In both versions, she was protecting someone when she died: Jennifer in the movie and Via in the series.
- Manuel was a serial killer in the series, but he appears as a guest at the wedding scene. It's likely that his character in the movie is not a serial killer.
- In both the movie and the TV series, Abdon (played by Ricardo Cepeda in the series and Carlos Morales in the movie) is killed by Selina after he places a time bomb in a money case. However, the reasons for his murder differ: in the series, Abdon blackmails Selina, while in the movie, he kills her daughter Nicole.
- In the series, Gilbert (Jay Manalo) was Gabriel's (Rico Yan) first rival for Via's (Claudine Barretto) love, while in the movie, Michael (Diether Ocampo) was Gabriel's first and only rival for her affection.
- In the series finale, Selina (Princess Punzalan) was hit by a 10-wheeler truck, resulting in her death. In the movie, she died in a car crash that led to an explosion after being punched and knocked down by Via, preventing her from escaping the vehicle.

== Remake ==
After the success of the remake of Mara Clara during the first quarter of the year, ABS-CBN announced and aired the remake of Mula Sa Puso which premiered on March 28 and ended on August 12, 2011.

== Re-runs ==
=== On television ===
Its first rerun was on Kapamilya Channel and at the second time, it reran on Jeepney TV from May 8, 2014 to January 21, 2016.

=== On online platforms ===
The series was rerun again by this time in Jeepney TV's YouTube channel starting June 17, 2021. They stopped premiering on August 12, 2023, resulting only 491 episodes in total they have been premiered and didn't resume the 492 until finale then.

It is streaming again for the second time in Jeepney TV's YouTube channel started on June 1, 2026. Airing every 1:00 PM and 1:30 PM which is two episodes a day replacing Sa Dulo ng Walang Hanggan.
