= Sherilyn Reyes-Tan =

Filipina actress (born 1975)

- Born: Sherilyne Uy Reyes; February 10, 1975 (age 51); Batangas, Philippines
- Other name: Mama Shey
- Occupation: Actress
- Years active: 1994–present
- Agent: Sparkle GMA Artist Center
- Known for: Home Along Da Riles; 'Sang Linggo nAPO Sila; Eat Bulaga!; Tropang Trumpo; Going Bayabas; All Together Now; Bahay Mo Ba 'To?; My Only Love; Mulawin; Encantadia Chronicles: Sang'gre; Si Manoy Ang Ninong Ko; Moms; Bubble Gang; The Borrowed Wife; Sinungaling Mong Puso; Pepito Manaloto
- Height: 5 ft 6 in (168 cm)
- Spouse: Chris Tan (civilly married December 17, 2003, church wedding December 10, 2012)
- Children: Ryle Paolo Tan aka Hashtag Ryle; Anya Sabrina Tan

Sherilyn Reyes-Tan (born February 10, 1975) is a Filipina actress, TV host, beauty queen (Mutya Ng Pilipinas Cebu 1994, Mutya Ng Pilipinas- Tourism 1994, Miss Tourism International 3rd runner up 1995) comedienne, television personality, host and entrepreneur. Started as one of the secretaries in Home Along Da Riles, became one of the co-hosts in Sang Linggo Napo Sila, top rating show/episode: FLAMES: Housemates, Heartmates (the only episode with sequel), Co-Host Eat Bulaga from 1999-2001, Other shows: All Together Now, Bahay Mo Bato, Bubble Gang, Tropang Trumpo, Going Bayabas, She is known for her role as Liza Arellano in Sinungaling Mong Puso, appeared in Magpakailanman’s Mother’s Day Special episode: A Mother’s Wish. One of the Hosts in MOMS talk Show. Now one of the top creators in Tiktok, liveselling for brands @sherilynrtan account), one of the hosts of Si Manoy Ang Ninong Ko (public service/travel show) She is also a parenting blogger and use Mama Shey as her name in her blogs. She has documenting her family adventures on her website and her incredibly popular Instagram account. She is also recognized as the mother of actor Hashtag Ryle.

== Education ==
She studied in Colegio dela Inmaculada Concepcion-Main in high school and St. Theresa's College Cebu, took up BS-Accountancy. After winning the title Mutya Ng Pilipinas- Cebu 1994 and Mutya Ng Pilipinas- Tourism 1995, she was discovered by Mr. Johnny Manahan in Cebu and immediately was offered a role in Home Along Da Riles..

== Business career ==
She owns the company Brand Cafe in Manila.

== Acting career ==
Her acting debut was with comedian Dolphy in Home Along Da Riles 2 (1997), where she was Babalu’s love interest. Later that year, she played a supporting role in the film Diliryo with Giselle Toengi and Jomari Yllana. In 2002, she starred in the film Pangako... Ikaw Lang with Regine Velasquez and Aga Muhlach where she played best friend to Velasquez's character.

== Personal life ==
She is married to ex-PBA player and former Meralco Bolts assistant coach, sports agent and businessman Chris Tan on December 17, 2003. Her children include Ryle Paolo, her son with Director Pablo "Junjun" Santiago Jr., eldest vlogger Lorenz, and Anya Sabrina .

== Filmography ==
=== Film ===
Year	Title	Role	Notes
1997	Home Along Da Riles 2		
1997	Amanos: Patas ang Laban	Angela	
1997	Go Johnny Go	Maela	
1997	Diliryo		
1997	Isang Tanong, Isang Sagot		
1998	Nagbibinata	Sammy	
1998	Dama de Noche		
2001	Pangako... Ikaw Lang	Annie	
2001	He...Susmaryosep! (4 Fathers)		
2005	Pinoy/Blonde		
2023	Mang Kanor	Maegan	
2026	Huwag Kang Titingin	Letty	

=== Television ===
Year	Title	Role
1995	Home Along Da Riles	Office Employee
1995	Maalaala Mo Kaya: Bigkis	
1999–2002, 2017	Bubble Gang	Herself
2002	Maalaala Mo Kaya: Videoke	
2004	Marinara	Arwana
2004–2007	Bahay Mo Ba 'To?	Jessica Benoit
2005	Sugo	Garela (The Succubus Winemaker/Magtutuba)
2005–2009	Eat Bulaga!	Herself (host)
2005–2009	Moms	Herself (host)
2007	Camera Café	Frida
2007–2008	Sine Novela: My Only Love	Lorena "Loren" Ramirez-Maravilla
2009	Ang Babaeng Hinugot sa Aking Tadyang	Galatea Alcaraz
2009	Rosalinda	Dulce
2010	The Last Prince	Cicit
2010–2011	Jillian: Namamasko Po	Donya Carmen
2012	Magpakailanman: Sa Likod ng mga Ngiti: The John Edric Ulang and Jaylord Casino Story	Liza
2012	My Daddy Dearest	Daphne
2012	Aso ni San Roque	Diga
2013	Kakambal ni Eliana	Nora Dominguez
2014	The Borrowed Wife	Mimi Perez-Garcia
2014	Niño	Cynthia Enriquez
2014	Seasons of Love: First Dance, First Love	Gloria Natividad
2015	Once Upon a Kiss	Jasmine
2015	Pepito Manaloto: Ang Tunay na Kuwento	Ellen/Elena
2016	Sinungaling Mong Puso	Mayora Liza Arellano
2016	Magpakailanman: Davao Bombing: Mga Kwento ng Pag-asa (Part 1 and Part 2)	Melanie
2016	Usapang Real Love: Relationship Goals	Queen
2017	Mulawin vs. Ravena	Lagrimas
2017	Daig Kayo ng Lola Ko: Mariel: Ang Lakwatserang Sirena	Marissa
2017	Magpakailanman: Our Viral Love - The Lance Fernandez and Ella Layar Story	Flor
2017	Magpakailanman: Love Knows No Age - The Gil Moreno and Mitch Tandingan Millennial Love Story	Melona
2018	Magpakailanman: Sa Kamay ng Sarili kong Ama	Carmen
2018	Magpakailanman: Ang Babaeng Tinimbang Ngunit Sobra - The Melinda Mara Story	Nanay Melissa
2020	Tadhana: Xtudent	Alma
2022	Pepito Manaloto: Ang Unang Kuwento	Magdalena Padilla
2022	Jose & Maria's Bonggang Villa	Marites
2022	Magpakailanman: Every Breath You Take - The Andrew Schimmer and Jho Rovero Story	Jho's mother
2023	Mga Lihim ni Urduja	Angkat
2023	AraBella	Nora Velasquez
2023	Lovers & Liars	Stella Tamayo
2024	Si Manoy ang Ninong Ko	Host
2025	Prinsesa ng City Jail	Alison Monastero
2025	Encantadia Chronicles: Sang'gre	Katrina Salvador
