= Let's Ask America =

American television game show

- Created by: Jeff Apploff
- Developed by: Jeff Apploff; Casey Green; Ben Betts; Todd Stevens; Jim Paratore
- Presented by: Kevin Pereira; Bill Bellamy
- Country of origin: United States
- Original language: English
- No. of seasons: 3

Production
- Running time: 22–24 minutes
- Production companies: paraMedia; E. W. Scripps Company; Telepictures

Original release
- Network: Syndication
- Release: September 17, 2012 – March 27, 2015

Let's Ask America is an American interactive game show which debuted on September 17, 2012. The show features contestants who play from their homes via webcams, answering trivia questions relating to current events. On November 4, 2013, it was announced that Scripps planned to launch Let's Ask America nationwide through a distribution deal with MGM Television. Contestants participate by Skype from the comfort of their own home, an inexpensive technology negating the need for travel expenses. In sweeps months, the show features celebrity editions featuring local news talent from the stations carrying the series such as meteorologists and anchors playing the game from their station's studios for local charities.

The program was hosted from its premiere through the summer of 2014 by Kevin Pereira. In July 2014, Bill Bellamy confirmed he had begun taping episodes as the host for the program's third season, set to begin that fall.

Produced by paraMedia and Telepictures, the program was created for the E. W. Scripps Company, and initially premiered on seven of its television stations alongside another Scripps-created program, the news magazine program The List. The premiere of the two programs are part of a strategy being undertaken by Scripps to replace existing syndicated programming in the valuable pre-primetime hour with new "home-grown" programs. These new programs would allow Scripps complete control over advertising inventories during the hour for better profitability, unlike Wheel of Fortune and Jeopardy!, which Scripps staff felt were too expensive and underperforming in comparison. Wheel and Jeopardy! were replaced by The List and Let's Ask America on the Scripps stations that carried them. Warner Bros. Domestic Television Distribution began to syndicate Let's Ask America to other markets at beginning of the 2013 season. The program is executive produced by Jeff Apploff, Jack Martin and Todd Stevens and is co-produced by Ben Betts and Casey Green.

Let's Ask America was canceled on March 24, 2015, due to low ratings, with the show's final episode airing three days later; reruns continued to air until the end of the season.

== Gameplay ==
In the first round, there are four contestants, each of whom attempt to answer the four multiple-choice questions. In this round, questions have two possible answers. The host first reads the two answers and then follows with the question. All four contestants then have approximately 30 seconds to write down their answers onto the card included in their game kits. Once all contestants have verbally acknowledged that they have written down their answers, the host asks them each to reveal their answers in a sequence determined by the producers. The host then reveals the correct answer, and each contestant that answered the question correctly is awarded the prize money assigned for that question. Contestants who answered incorrectly receive no prize money. After the correct answer to the first question has been revealed, all four contestants are given the next question. The process is then repeated with three additional questions. The first question is worth $100, with subsequent questions increasing by that amount, up to $400 for the fourth question. The lowest scoring contestant at the end of the round is eliminated and leaves with nothing (or $1,000 for charity).

The second round is conducted in the same manner, with each question having three possible answers. Question values begin at $500 and increase by that amount, up to $1,500 for the third question. Again, the contestant with the lowest amount of money is eliminated and leaves with nothing (or $1,000 for charity).

The third round features the two remaining contestants competing against each other in a two-question showdown. Each question features four possible answers. The first question is worth $2,000 and the second is worth $4,000. The higher-scoring contestant at the end of the third round is the winner and keeps the money earned, and the runner-up is eliminated and leaves with nothing (or $1,000 for charity).

=== Dash for Ca$h ===
If two or more contestants are tied for the lowest score, a tiebreaker determines which contestant is eliminated. The tied contestants play a special game called "Dash for Ca$h". The host gives the contestants a name of an item they must find within their home. The contestant who finds the required item last or fails to find the item is eliminated. Some rounds feature specific rules the contestants must follow while searching for the item, a certain activity that must be completed once the item is found, or starting in the second season, the host gives the contestants a question with two answers, and the contestants must find the correct item related to the answer first to move on.

=== Bonus round ===
During the commercial break, the winning-contestant writes down a wager for the final question. The question is then presented along with four possible answers, and the contestant must answer the question within 30 seconds. A correct response adds the wager to the contestant's final total, while an incorrect response deducts that amount. However, if the contestant wagers all the money they earned up to that point and answers correctly, the wager is paid out at 5-to-1 odds (e.g., if a contestant wagered their maximum of $10,000 and is correct, the contestants maximum win up to $50,000 in the first two seasons or maximum of $7,000 to $35,000 in the third season). During its three-season run, David Luea from Boston, MA was the only contestant able to play a perfect game and take home the top prize of $50,000.

In the first season only, a contestant who wagered their entire winnings on the final question and failed to provide a correct answer was given a $1,000 consolation prize (or merchandise if the contestant's final score was less than $2,000 before the start of the bonus round). Starting in the second season, contestants who wager their entire score but are incorrect leave with nothing.

== Reruns ==
Reruns of the show have aired on GSN in the past.

== International versions ==
Country	Name	Host(s)	Channel	Premiere
Saudi Arabia	اسأل السعوديةإ سأل_السعودية Let's Ask Al Saudia إسأل السعودي Let's Ask Saudia	Abdul Majeed Al-Rahidi; Faisal Al-Saleh	Al Saudiya	January 10, 2021
France	Jouons à la maison	Alex Goude	France 3	April 18, 2020 – February 20, 2021
Philippines	Let's Ask Pilipinas	Aga Muhlach; Ogie Alcasid	TV5	October 14, 2013 – November 21, 2014
Poland	Kto to wie?	Dorota Wellman	TVN	February 27, 2023 – April 28, 2023

=== Cincinnati version ===
A locally produced version of Let's Ask America for Cincinnati, Ohio, titled Let's Ask Cincinnati and hosted by Bob Goen, aired on Scripps's WCPO-TV in 2014. The format was the same as the regular version, with Cincinnati celebrities and personalities playing for local charities.

=== Philippine version ===
A short-lived version of Let's Ask America titled Let's Ask Pilipinas airs in the Philippines on TV5 and is hosted by Aga Muhlach in Seasons 1 and 2 followed by Ogie Alcasid in Season 3. The program is part of the network's Everyday All the Way weekday primetime block, and originally aired on the network from October 14, 2013, until March 28, 2014. However, the series was revived on July 7, 2014, until its cancellation on November 21, 2014, after three seasons.

=== French version ===
A short-lived version of Let's Ask America titled Jouons à la maison airs in the French on France 3 and is hosted by Alex Goude and has aired on the network originally on April 18, 2020, and ended on February 20, 2021. This was made due to the COVID-19 epidemic at the time.

=== Polish version ===
Polish version of the show, Kto to wie? (meaning: Who knows it?), aired in the spring season of 2023 on TVN. The show was cancelled after one series.

=== Arabic version ===
An Arabic version of Let's Ask America titled اسأل السعوديةإ سأل_السعودية# Let's Ask Al Saudia Let's Ask Saudia إسأل السعودية aired in Saudi Arabia on Al Saudiya and is hosted by Abdul Majeed Al-Rahidi who was later replaced by Faisal Al-Saleh in season 2 and is produced by In Media Plus aired on Saudi Channel -1 originally on January 10, 2021. Like the French version, this was made due to the COVID-19 epidemic at the time.
