= Mel Mendoza-del Rosario =

Filipino screenwriter

Melissa Mendoza-del Rosario is a Filipino screenwriter. She won the Gawad Urian Award for Best Screenplay in 1996 for the film Sana Maulit Muli. In 2003, she wrote the comedy film Ang Tanging Ina that broke the record for the highest-grossing Philippine film of all time and spawned a franchise.

== Early life and education ==
Mel Mendoza-del Rosario was born to Manolo and Luningning Mendoza. In 1975, Luningning had a stroke, with Mel stating that her mother's later motivation in going outside the family house was to see her daughter's name appear in films at the theater.

== Career ==
In 1992, Mendoza-del Rosario began her career in the film industry writing scripts for the ABS-CBN television anthology series Maalaala Mo Kaya. In 1994, she wrote her first screenplay for the film adaptation of the series, Maalaala Mo Kaya: The Movie, alongside director Olivia Lamasan, Shaira Mella-Salvador, and Don Cuaresma. By 1996, she, Lamasan and Mella-Salvador jointly won the Gawad Urian Award for Best Screenplay for the romance film Sana Maulit Muli. Her next film as screenwriter, Campus Girls, was produced by Viva Films and composed by her husband Ricky del Rosario.

In 1999, Mendoza-del Rosario wrote a screenplay about two sisters titled Magkapatid, having actress Sharon Cuneta in mind for the part of the elder sister. Due to Cuneta's busy schedule, Mendoza-del Rosario waited three years for Cuneta's availability before submitting her script, while concerns from actress Judy Ann Santos in portraying a young mother of four nearly caused the project to be shelved; Mendoza-del Rosario compromised with Santos by rewriting her role to instead be a mother of two.

== Personal life ==
Mendoza-del Rosario was married to Ricky "Boy" R. del Rosario, a record executive, film composer and Quezon City councilor, who passed away on January 27, 2026 at the age of 74.

== Filmography ==
=== Film ===
Year	Title	Director	Note(s)
1994	Maalaala Mo Kaya: The Movie	Olivia M. Lamasan	with Shaira Mella-Salvador, Don Cuaresma, Olivia M. Lamasan
1995	Campus Girls	Mac Alejandre	with Shaira Mella Salvador
1995	Basta't Kasama Kita	Rory B. Quintos	with Jerry Lopez Sineneng, Don Cuaresma, Olivia M. Lamasan
1995	Sana Maulit Muli	Olivia M. Lamasan	with Olivia Lamasan, Shaira M. Salvador
1995	Manalo, Matalo, Mahal Kita	Edgardo "Boy" Vinarao	
1996	Sa Aking mga Kamay	Rory B. Quintos	with Ricky Lee, Benjou Elgincolin
1996	Wanted: Perfect Mother	Ike Jarlego Jr.	credited as "Melissa Mendoza del Rosario"
1996	Hindi Ako Ander (Itanong Mo Kay Kumander)	Edgardo "Boy" Vinarao	
1996	Mula Noon Hanggang Ngayon	Khryss Adalia	with Shaira Mella-Salvador, Jojo Atienza, Khryss Adalia also story
1996	Mahal Kita, Alam Mo Ba	Edgardo "Boy" Vinarao	
1996	Do Re Mi	Ike Jarlego Jr.	
1996	Strict ang Peyrents Ko	Edgardo 'Boy' Vinarao	
1997	Dahil Tanging Ikaw	Mac C. Alejandre	
1997	Roberta	Ike Jarlego Jr.	
1997	Isang Tanong, Isang Sagot	Mac C. U. Alejandre	
1997	Hanggang Ngayon Ika'y Minamahal	Ike Jarlego Jr.	
1997	Honey, Nasa Langit Na Ba Ako?	Edgardo "Boy" Vinarao	
1998	Kung Ayaw Mo, Huwag Mo!	Jerry Lopez Sineneng	with Jerry Lopez Sineneng also story
1998	Pusong Mamon	Joel Lamangan; Enrico Quizon	with Ricardo Lee
1998	Muling Ibalik ang Tamis ng Pag-ibig	Boots Plata	
1998	MysTrio (Uno...Dos...Tres Pilyos!)	Edgardo "Boy" Vinarao	
1999	My Pledge of Love Cannot Be Broken	Boots Plata	
1999	Dahil May Isang Ikaw	Binibining Joyce Bernal	
1999	Tigasin	Ike Jarlego Jr.	
1999	Hey Babe!	Bb. Joyce Bernal	with Ricky Lee also story
1999	Dito sa Puso Ko	Enrico S. Quizon	
1999	Weder-Weder Lang 'Yan	Boots Plata	
2000	Daddy O, Baby O!	Enrico S. Quizon	
2000	Kailangan Ko'y Ikaw	Binibining Joyce Bernal	
2001	Booba	Binibining Joyce Bernal	
2001	Pangako... Ikaw Lang	Binibining Joyce Bernal	
2002	Mahal Kita, Final Answer	Ike Jarlego Jr.	
2002	Kung Ikaw Ay Isang Panaginip.	Wenn V. Deramas	with Ricky Lee, Wenn V. Deramas
2002	Ikaw Lamang Hanggang Ngayon	Yam Laranas	
2002	Akala Mo...	Lyle Sacris	
2002	Magkapatid	Joel C. Lamangan	
2003	Till There Was You	Bb. Joyce Bernal	with Dindo Perez
2003	Ang Tanging Ina	Wenn V. Deramas	with Keiko Aquino also story
2003	Utang ng Ama	Tony Y. Reyes	
2003	My First Romance	Don Cuaresma	"Two Hearts" segment
2004	Otso-Otso: Pamela-Mela Wan	Jerry Lopez Sineneng	
2004	Masikip sa Dibdib: The Boobita Rose Story	Bb. Joyce Bernal	
2004	All My Life	Laurenti M. Dyogi	with Mia Concio
2004	Volta	Wenn V. Deramas	with Artemio Abad
2004	Bcuz of U	John D. Lazatin; Mae Cruz; Cathy Garcia-Molina	
2006	Close to You	Cathy Garcia-Molina	with John Paul Abellera
2006	Kapag Tumibok ang Puso: Not Once, But Twice	Wenn V. Deramas	with Arlene Tamayo also story
2007	Agent X44	Bb. Joyce Bernal	with Galo Ador Jr., Trina Marie T. Dusaban, Raz de la Torre
2007	Ang Cute ng Ina Mo!	Wenn V. Deramas	with Wenn V. Deramas, Arlene Tamayo also story
2007	Paano Kita Iibigin	Bb. Joyce Bernal	with John Paul Abellera, Vanessa Valdez
2007	I've Fallen for You	Lino Cayetano	
2008	Ang Tanging Ina N'yong Lahat	Wenn V. Deramas	with Wenn V. Deramas, Kriz G. Gazmen also story
2009	BFF: Best Friends Forever	Wenn V. Deramas	
2010	Hating Kapatid	Wenn V. Deramas	
2010	Petrang Kabayo	Wenn V. Deramas	with Wenn V. Deramas also story
2010	Ang Tanging Ina Mo: Last Na 'To!	Wenn V. Deramas	
2011	Catch Me... I'm in Love	Mae Czarina Cruz	
2011	My House Husband: Ikaw Na!	Jose Javier Reyes	with Jose Javier Reyes also story
2012	Moron 5 and the Crying Lady	Wenn V. Deramas	with Wenn V. Deramas
2012	Every Breath You Take	Mae Czarina Cruz	with Zig Marasigan, Anj Pessumal also story
2012	Of All the Things	Bb. Joyce Bernal	
2012	This Guy's in Love with U Mare!	Wenn V. Deramas	with Keiko Aquino, Wenn V. Deramas
2012	A Secret Affair	Nuel Crisostomo Naval	
2013	Girl, Boy, Bakla, Tomboy	Wenn V. Deramas	
2014	Diary ng Panget	Andoy L. Ranay	
2014	Moron 5.2: The Transformation	Wenn V. Deramas	with Wenn V. Deramas
2014	Past Tense	Mae Czarina Cruz-Alviar	as story writer only with Artemio Abad
2015	Para sa Hopeless Romantic	Andoy L. Ranay	with Mary Rose Colindres
2015	Beauty and the Bestie	Wenn V. Deramas	
2016	This Time	Nuel Crisostomo Naval	
2019	S.O.N.S: Sons of Nanay Sabel	Dado Lumibao	
2019	Miracle in Cell No. 7	Nuel Crisostomo Naval	
2021	More Than Blue	Nuel Crisostomo Naval	
2022	Always	Dado Lumibao	
2022	Family Matters	Nuel Crisostomo Naval	
2023	Adik sa 'Yo	Nuel Crisostomo Naval	
2023	Family of Two (A Mother and Son Story)	Nuel Crisostomo Naval	
2024	Sunny	Jalz Zarate	
2025	The Last Beergin	Nuel C. Naval	

=== Television ===
Year	Title	Director	Note(s)
1992–2003	Maalaala Mo Kaya	various	
1999	Mikee Forever	Ipe Pelino	
2012	Mundo Man Ay Magunaw	Jeffrey R. Jeturian; Rechie A. del Carmen	as creator and producer only
2012–2014	Be Careful with My Heart	Jeffrey R. Jeturian; Mervyn B. Brondial; Theodore Boborol	as creator only
2013	Dugong Buhay	Toto Natividad	as producer only
2014–2015	Dream Dad	Jeffrey R. Jeturian; Chris Alan Chanliongco	as creator only
2015	Oh My G!	Veronica B. Velasco; Paco Sta. Maria	as creator only
2015	Nasaan Ka Nang Kailangan Kita	Jeffrey R. Jeturian; Mervyn B. Brondial; Cathy O. Camarillo	as creator only
2015–2016	Ningning	Jeffrey R. Jeturian; Paco Sta. Maria	as creator only
2016	Be My Lady	Theodore Boborol; Don Cuaresma; Roderick Lindayag	as creator only
2016	We Will Survive	Jeffrey R. Jeturian; Mervyn B. Brondial	as creator and producer only
2016–2017	Langit Lupa	Carlo Po Artillaga; Myla Ajero-Gaite; Ludwig Peralta	as creator only
2017	The Better Half	Jeffrey R. Jeturian; Topel Lee	as creator only
2018–2019	Playhouse	Jeffrey R. Jeturian; Paco Sta. Maria	as creator only
2019	Nang Ngumiti ang Langit	FM Reyes; Marinette Natividad-de Guzman	as creator only
2020–2021	Bagong Umaga	Carlo Po Artillaga; Paco A. Sta. Maria	as creator only
2022	2 Good 2 Be True	Mae Cruz-Alviar; Paco Sta. Maria	as producer only

== Accolades ==
Year	Award-giving body	Category	Nominated work	Result	Ref.
1996	19th Gawad Urian Awards	Best Screenplay	Sana Maulit Muli	Won	
2002	2002 Manila Film Festival	Best Screenplay	Magkapatid	Won	
2002	2002 Manila Film Festival	Best Original Story	Magkapatid	Won	
2008	56th FAMAS Awards	Best Screenplay	Paano Kita Iibigin	Nominated	
2010	36th Metro Manila Film Festival	Best Screenplay	Ang Tanging Ina Mo: Last Na 'To!	Won	
2010	36th Metro Manila Film Festival	Best Original Story	Ang Tanging Ina Mo: Last Na 'To!	Won	
2011	27th PMPC Star Awards for Movies	Original Screenplay of the Year	Ang Tanging Ina Mo: Last Na 'To!	Nominated	
2011	59th FAMAS Awards	Best Screenplay	Ang Tanging Ina Mo: Last Na 'To!	Nominated	
2013	61st FAMAS Awards	Best Screenplay	A Secret Affair	Nominated	
2013	39th Metro Manila Film Festival	Best Screenplay	Girl, Boy, Bakla, Tomboy	Nominated	
2013	39th Metro Manila Film Festival	Best Original Story	Girl, Boy, Bakla, Tomboy	Nominated	
2014	30th PMPC Star Awards for Movies	Original Screenplay of the Year	Girl, Boy, Bakla, Tomboy	Nominated	
2016	64th FAMAS Awards	Best Screenplay	Para sa Hopeless Romantic	Nominated	
2023	71st FAMAS Awards	Best Screenplay	Family Matters	Nominated	
2023	27th Gawad PASADO	PinakaPASADOng Istorya ng Taon	Family Matters	Won	
2023	39th Luna Awards	Best Screenplay	Family Matters	Nominated	
2023	6th EDDYS	Best Screenplay	Family Matters	Won	
2024	39th PMPC Star Awards for Movies	Movie Screenwriter of the Year	Family Matters	Nominated	
