= Sa Aking mga Kamay =

1996 psychological thriller drama film by Rory B. Quintos

Sa Aking Mga Kamay
- Theatrical poster
- Directed by: Rory B. Quintos
- Screenplay by: Ricky Lee; Mel Mendoza-del Rosario; Benjou Elgincolin
- Story by: Olivia M. Lamasan
- Produced by: Charo Santos-Concio; Lily Y. Monteverde; Malou N. Santos
- Starring: Christopher de Leon; Aga Muhlach; Chin Chin Gutierrez; Kier Legaspi; Amy Austria; Robert Arevalo
- Cinematography: Romy Vitug
- Edited by: Jesus "Jess" Navarro
- Music by: Nonong Buencamino
- Production company: Star Cinema
- Distributed by: Star Cinema
- Release date: March 7, 1996
- Running time: 115 minutes
- Country: Philippines
- Language: Filipino

Sa Aking Mga Kamay (English: In My Own Hands) is a 1996 Philippine psychological thriller drama film directed by Rory B. Quintos and written by Ricky Lee, Mel Mendoza-del Rosario, and Benjou Elgincolin from a story concept developed by Olivia M. Lamasan. The film stars Christopher de Leon, Aga Muhlach and Chin Chin Gutierrez, with a supporting cast including Kier Legaspi, Amy Austria, Robert Arevalo, and Karl Angelo Legaspi.

The story follows a tale of perilous pursuit: the brutal deaths of numerous married women, committed by a commercial director who also acts as an anonymous psychopathic serial killer, led an NBI agent to hunt him down to end his killing spree; his obsession with the criminal case prevented him from realizing that his wife would be the next victim.

Produced and distributed by Star Cinema, the film was theatrically released on March 7, 1996. In 2017, it was digitally restored and remastered by ABS-CBN Film Restoration, in partnership with Central Digital Lab. A streaming series that serves as a follow-up to the film, Cattleya Killer, was released on June 1, 2023.

== Plot ==
Gene Rivera, a director for television commercials, also operates as a serial killer known as "The Cattleya Killer", whose modus operandi involves seducing married women before murdering them and leaving a cattleya flower near their corpses.

National Bureau of Investigation agent Joven dela Rosa investigates the murders along with his partner Dino. His focus on the investigation alienates his wife Camille and their son Benjie, who suffers from nyctophobia. Gene brings his latest victim, Erlinda, to their family's private resort; his uncle Rolando follows after learning about the trip. After a sexual encounter with Erlinda, Gene attacks her with a baseball bat. Rolando learns what happened but is dissuaded from informing the authorities by Gene, and they carefully clean the house before hiding Erlinda's body. Following the leads, Joven and Dino arrive at the resort, and Gene hides before a shootout erupts, leading to Joven fatally shooting Rolando. Following the incident, Gene swears vengeance against Joven. Meanwhile, Erlinda manages to survive her injuries but is prevented from talking to Joven and Dino by her uncooperative husband.

While waiting for Benjie at school, Gene befriends Camille, and the two develop mutual feelings for each other. Gene then acquaints himself with Joven under a different persona. Gene invites Camille to his house and tells her about his past: as a child, he was often locked up by his mother for making mistakes, including the time he accidentally broke a vase holding a Cattleya. One night, he witnessed his father kill his mother for having an affair before killing himself. Gene then confesses his love for Camille, who refuses to go any further, and is raped by Gene. Camille hides the truth from Joven, telling him that someone drugged her. Camille later receives a videotape from Gene, who is recording his sexual advances, then gets a phone call from him saying he has her wedding ring before threatening to expose her infidelity to Joven.

Joven and Gene talk to each other about Camille; Gene asks what Joven would do if he learned his wife is having an affair, and states that he would kill her when Joven returns the question. Joven learns about Camille's affair, and Gene threatens Camille and orders her to go to his house. When Gene gives him a gun with an icon of a Cattleya, Joven decides to visit Erlinda at the hospital, along with Dino. At Gene's house, Camille sees pictures of different women, including her, as well as different wedding rings, and realizes that he is the Cattleya Killer. Gene tries to kill Camille, who manages to escape, but she is recaptured along with Benjie. At the hospital, Joven and Dino realize that Gene is the killer after Erlinda reacts violently to a picture of him.

Joven and Dino go to Gene's house and find the wedding rings of his victims, including Camille's, which shocks him. He then rushes home, where he sees Gene and Camille's sex tape. He is then told by Gene to go to his ancestral house, where Camille and Benjie are being held. There, Gene explains that the murders are revenge for the infidelity of married women and Rolando's death. Joven and Dino fight with Gene, who shoots Dino before holding Benjie at gunpoint. Gene then tells Joven to kill Camille, or he will kill Benjie. Joven fires at Camille's mirror reflection before fatally shooting a distracted Gene.

Joven assures Benjie that he has nothing to fear, then announces his plans to spend more time with his family. He then puts Camille's wedding ring on her finger, and they share an embrace.

== Cast ==
=== Main cast ===
- Christopher de Leon as Joven dela Rosa: An agent of the NBI who is assigned to track the trail of the serial killer named Gene Rivera. He is married to Camille, and they have a son, Benjie.
- Aga Muhlach as Gene Rivera: A psychopathic serial killer known under the alias of the "Cattleya Killer". His motive is to form a relationship with young women by seducing them and then killing them afterward. Because of his notoriety as a serial killer, Joven was assigned to kill him.
  - Stefano Mori as young Gene
- Chin Chin Gutierrez as Camille dela Rosa: Joven's wife and mother to their son, Benjie. She is the latest victim of Gene, who preys on beautiful and married women.
- Kier Legaspi as Dino: Joven's partner in the NBI.
- Amy Austria as Anne: One of Joven's workmates in the NBI office. She described Gene Rivera as a "psychopath".
- Robert Arevalo as Rolando Galvez: Gene's uncle who caught him in the aftermath of a killing.
- Karl Angelo Legaspi as Benjie dela Rosa: Joven and Camille's son.
- Teresa Loyzaga as Sally Vitan: Camille's best friend.

=== Other cast ===
- Tess Michelena as Carmen
- Mae-ann Adonis as Dang
- Rosemarie Gil as Camille's Mom
- Ramil Rodriguez as Camille's Dad
- Romeo Rivera as Boss of NBI
- Orestes Ojeda as Gene's Dad
- Tata Melendez as Gene's Mom
- Rachel Lobangco as Erlinda Sioson (Victim #2)
- Cris Michelena as Victim #2's husband
- Tracy B. Montelibano as Newscaster
- Manny Mendoza as Field Reporter
- Zaffy Alonzo, Shannen Torres, and Patricia Ann Bermudez as Victims
- Jon Santillan-Wong, Marcel Sagum, Albert Guia, Francis Danuelas, Arman Drigo, Stan Sambrano, Alzie Mascenon, Eric Laygo, and Wilson Santiago as NBI Agents
- Archie Adamos, Jhop Bahian, Manolo Quequing, Edgar Buenavides, Robert Camisik, Lito Paraiso, and Abel Lagmay as Goons
- Eddie Albert Ramos and Princess Ann Schuck as Hostaged Children
- Arnold Montes and Bobet Aniversario as Waiters
- Jaime Hizon and Raffy Garcia as Joven's Brothers-in-Law
- Imelda Trinidad and Jeanette Tan as Joven's Sisters-in-Law
- Vic Gabion and Noel Lazaro as Security Guards
- The Powerdance Group as Commercial Dancers
- Noel Sandoval, Jojo Lopez, Benny Bautista, Nido De Jesus, and Jun Dada as Policemen
- Raul Agravante as Reportermille's son

== Production ==
The film was given acknowledgment by the National Bureau of Investigation and Makati Medical Center.

=== Casting and shooting ===
Aga Muhlach, playing the role of Gene Rivera, stated that his role was a challenge for him because it was different from playing a serial killer rather than his usual role as a leading man in romance films. While the film was shooting, he admitted that he was not prepared to face Christopher de Leon, who played the role of Joven dela Rosa, an agent from the NBI who was assigned to find Gene and kill him.

Christopher de Leon also admitted that even though he said that it was a very interesting role, the references to the NBI made him feel anxious and worried, but the experience in the criminal investigation field during the shoot allowed him to shape his character better.

== Reception ==
=== Critical response ===
Jay Cruz, writing for Sinegang PH gave the film 4 out of 5 stars and praised Ricky Lee's writing, where he "essentially turned a psychopathic serial killer’s violence towards the calculated destruction of a family"; Rory Quintos' direction; and the respective acting performances of Aga Muhlach and Christopher de Leon, with the former being commended for playing roles other than being a leading man in numerous romance films.

DJ Ramones, writing for Reverse Delay, gave a positive review, praising the film's written story by Olivia Lamasan and screenplay by Mel Mendoza-del Rosario, Ricky Lee, and Benjou Elgincolin; Romeo Vitug's photography that has similarity to the 1991 film Hihintayin Kita sa Langit; and the characters portrayed in the film.

=== Accolades ===
Year	Award-Giving Body	Category	Recipient	Result
1997	FAMAS Awards	Best Actress	Chin Chin Gutierrez	Nominated

== Television sequel ==
In 2022, ABS-CBN announced a follow-up to the film, a television series for international audiences titled Cattleya Killer. The series premiered on June 1, 2023, on Prime Video, directed by Dan Villegas, written by Dodo Dayao, and produced by its executive producer Ruel S. Bayani. Arjo Atayde plays the role of Anton dela Rosa and Christopher de Leon, reprises the role of Joven dela Rosa. It would also star Jake Cuenca, Zsa Zsa Padilla, Ricky Davao, Nonie Buencamino, Frances Makil-Ignacio, Ketchup Eusebio, Jojit Lorenzo, Rafa Siguion-Reyna and Jane Oineza in the project.
