= Suntok sa Buwan =

2022 Philippine television drama series

- Title card
- Genre: Sports drama
- Written by: Antoinette Jadaone
- Directed by: Geo Lomuntad
- Starring: Aga Muhlach; Elijah Canlas
- Opening theme: "Sa Ngalan Ng Pag-Ibig" by December Avenue
- Country of origin: Philippines
- Original language: Filipino
- No. of episodes: 65

Production
- Executive producer: Robert Galang
- Producers: Antoinette Jadaone; Dan Villegas
- Production location: Baguio
- Running time: 45-60 minutes
- Production companies: Project 8; Cignal Entertainment

Original release
- Network: TV5
- Release: July 18 – December 8, 2022

Suntok sa Buwan (transl. punch in the moon) is a 2022 Philippine television sports drama series broadcast by TV5. Directed by Geo Lomuntad, it stars Aga Muhlach and Elijah Canlas. It aired on the network's TodoMax Primetime Singko line up from July 18 to December 8, 2022, replacing Dear God.

== Plot ==
Jimmy Boy (Muhlach), a retired boxer who currently works as a taxi driver, has Stage 3 cancer. This diagnosis deeply affects his son, Dos (Canlas), who dreams of becoming a professional boxer like his father. The two will face conflicts and life-challenging experiences that would lead one of them to make sacrifices and strengthen their bond as father and son.

== Cast and characters ==
Main cast

- Aga Muhlach as Jaime "Jimmy Boy" Laurente
- Elijah Canlas as Jaime "Dos" Laurente II

Supporting cast

- Maris Racal as Trina "Tinay"
- Pewee O'Hara as Apung
- Matet de Leon as Nesthy
- Albie Casiño as Pistol
- Rez Cortez as Magnum / Migs
- Awra Briguela as Orange
- Paulo Angeles as Barok
- Bianca Manalo as Joy
- Ronnie Lazaro as Mr. Seng
- Bobby Andrews as Benj
- Teejay Marquez as Carlton Saavedra
- Ketchup Eusebio as Tonio
- Gio Alvarez as Arthur

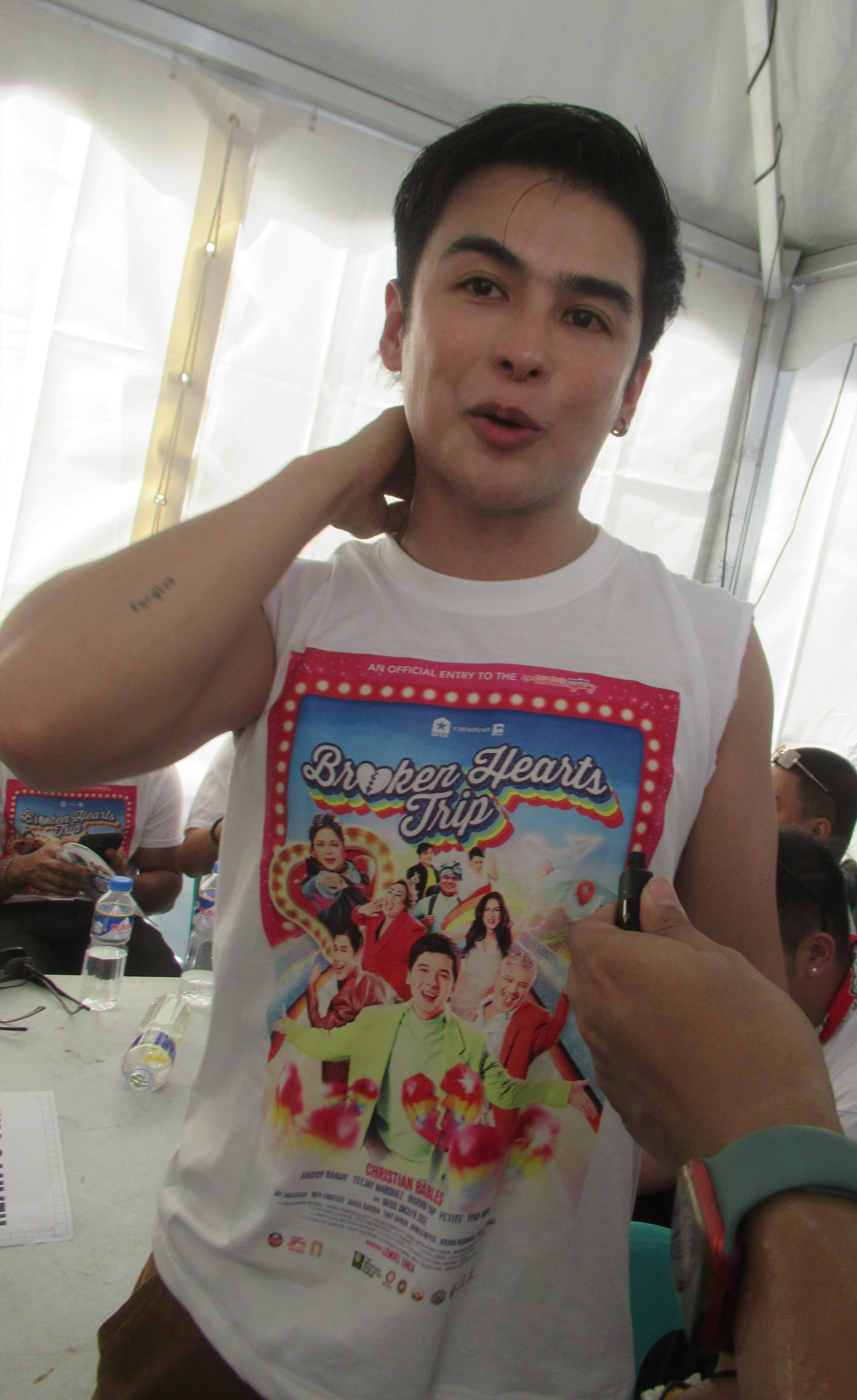
Teejay Marquez

== Production ==
The series marks Aga Muhlach's first series in a decade since M3: Malay Mo Ma-develop in 2010. He stated that he would accept an offer as long as it takes place in Baguio.

This series had a 5-night special on September 12 to 16.

== Episodes ==
Suntok sa Buwan episodes
No.	Title	Original release date	AGB Nielsen Ratings (NUTAM People)
1	"Premiere"	July 18, 2022	N/A
2	"Round 2"	July 19, 2022	N/A
3	"Suntok ng Buhay"	July 21, 2022	N/A
4	"Laban"	July 25, 2022	N/A
5	"Magkasangga"	July 26, 2022	N/A
6	"Palaban"	July 28, 2022	N/A
7	"Ang Pagkikita"	August 1, 2022	N/A
8	"Ang Simula"	August 2, 2022	N/A
9	"Inspirasyon"	August 4, 2022	N/A
10	"Panaginip"	August 8, 2022	N/A
11	"Manindigan"	August 9, 2022	N/A
12	"Banta"	August 11, 2022	N/A
13	"Kasama"	August 15, 2022	N/A
14	"Panganib"	August 16, 2022	N/A
15	"Paghihintay"	August 18, 2022	N/A
16	"Maling Akala"	August 22, 2022	N/A
17	"Pangamba"	August 23, 2022	N/A
18	"Ang Desisyon"	August 25, 2022	N/A
19	"Patalo"	August 29, 2022	N/A
20	"Kulong"	August 30, 2022	N/A
21	"Dobol Trobol"	September 1, 2022	N/A
22	"Jimmy Boy vs. Mr. Seng"	September 5, 2022	N/A
23	"Suntok ni Dos"	September 6, 2022	N/A
24	"Mahal Kita, Trina"	September 8, 2022	N/A
25	"Jimmy Boy vs. Dos"	September 12, 2022	N/A
26	"Martir Ka, Barok"	September 13, 2022	N/A
27	"Mayakap Kang Muli"	September 14, 2022	N/A
28	"Welcome to Paraiso"	September 15, 2022	N/A
29	"Hihintayin Kita, Dos"	September 16, 2022	N/A
30	"Hindi Naging Tayo"	September 19, 2022	N/A
31	"May Aamin"	September 20, 2022	N/A
32	"Pasaway Ka, Dos"	September 22, 2022	N/A
33	"Alas ni Jimmy Boy"	September 26, 2022	N/A
34	"May Magpapaalam"	September 27, 2022	N/A
35	"Masamang Bangungot"	September 29, 2022	N/A
36	"Meet Tinay"	October 3, 2022	N/A
37	"Joy to Jimmy Boy's World"	October 4, 2022	N/A
38	"Second Chance"	October 6, 2022	N/A
39	"Coach Dos"	October 10, 2022	N/A
40	"Good Guy Barok"	October 11, 2022	N/A
41	"Kwento ni Jimmy Boy"	October 13, 2022	N/A
42	"Para Kay Dos"	October 17, 2022	N/A
43	"Ang Babala"	October 18, 2022	N/A
44	"Sino ang Matapang?"	October 20, 2022	N/A
45	"Sagot sa Panalangin"	October 24, 2022	N/A
46	"Kapalit ng Kabutihan"	October 25, 2022	N/A
47	"Ang Laban ni Jimmy Boy"	October 27, 2022	N/A
48	"Tamis ng Oo"	October 31, 2022	N/A
49	"Detective Dos"	November 1, 2022	N/A
50	"Panata ng Magulang"	November 3, 2022	N/A
51	"Bigat ng Isang Suntok"	November 7, 2022	N/A
52	"Father vs. Son"	November 8, 2022	N/A
53	"Bad Boy Dos"	November 10, 2022	N/A
54	"Naligaw ng Landas"	November 14, 2022	N/A
55	"Sino ang Traydor?"	November 15, 2022	N/A
56	"Walang Iwanan"	November 17, 2022	N/A
57	"Ang Totoong Joy"	November 21, 2022	N/A
58	"Dos, the Assassin"	November 22, 2022	N/A
59	"Lover Boy Barok"	November 24, 2022	N/A
60	"Selos"	November 28, 2022	N/A
61	"Ang Pamamaalam"	November 29, 2022	N/A
62	"Ang Pagtatago"	December 1, 2022	N/A
63	"Walang Takas"	December 5, 2022	N/A
64	"Huling Hantungan"	December 6, 2022	N/A
65	"Suntok ng Tagumpay"	December 8, 2022	N/A
