= Got 2 Believe =

2002 romantic comedy-drama film by Olivia M. Lamasan

- Official Movie Poster
- Directed by: Olivia M. Lamasan
- Screenplay by: Mia A. Concio; Olivia M. Lamasan
- Story by: Mia A. Concio
- Produced by: Charo Santos-Concio; Malou N. Santos
- Starring: Claudine Barretto; Rico Yan
- Cinematography: Shayne Sarte
- Edited by: Marya Ignacio
- Music by: Jessie Lasaten
- Production company: Star Cinema
- Distributed by: Star Cinema
- Release date: February 27, 2002
- Running time: 113 minutes
- Country: Philippines
- Language: Filipino
- Box office: ₱112 million

Got 2 Believe is a 2002 Filipino romantic comedy film directed by Olivia M. Lamasan from a screenplay she co-wrote with Mia A. Concio, who solely wrote the storyline. Starring Claudine Barretto and Rico Yan in his last film before he died a month later, with the supporting cast including Dominic Ochoa, Vhong Navarro, Carlo Muñoz, Nikki Valdez, Cherry Pie Picache, and Noel Trinidad, the story follows a hopeless romantic wedding coordinator who strike a relationship with a skeptical photographer, which led to question their feelings to each other.

The title originated from the song "Got to Believe in Magic", originally sung by David Pomeranz from a composition and written lyrics by Charles Fox and Stephen Geyer, which was covered for the film by Joey Generoso, vocalist of Side A.

Produced and distributed by Star Cinema, the film was theatrically released on February 27, 2002, and became a box office success. In 2015, it was digitally remastered by ABS-CBN Film Restoration, in partnership with Central Digital Lab.

== Plot ==
Young wedding photographer Lorenz doesn't think happy endings are possible. He receives an offer from his cousin one day to pursue a career as an international photographer. The catch is that he has to have an exclusive photo shoot with Toni, who frequently shows up at the weddings he covers. Toni, a 25-year-old wedding coordinator, is known as the perennial bridesmaid. For her clients, she designs the ideal weddings. If she doesn't find her Mr. Right at this age, it's said that she will be unmarried for the rest of her life — a family curse.

However, Toni declined Lorenz's invitation to participate in the photo shoot after discovering that he was the photographer who had captured all of her uncomfortable and honest images that had appeared in different wedding publications. However, Lorenz is able to persuade Toni to accept his offer when he promises to arrange a date with his friend, who is a bachelor and lives overseas. Toni accepts the deal. She does, however, wish that it would be Lorenz when Mr. Right arrives to sweep her off her feet. Conversely, Lorenz is progressively developing feelings for Toni. Will their story have a magical conclusion?

== Cast and characters ==
- Claudine Barretto as Antonia 'Toni' Villacosta
- Rico Yan as Lorenz Montinola
- Vhong Navarro as Rudolph
- Dominic Ochoa as Perry
- Nikki Valdez as Karen
- Carlo Muñoz as Arnold
- Noel Trinidad as Judge Villacosta
- Wilma Doesnt as Catherine 'Cathy' Garcia
- Maribeth Bichara as Aunt Cary
- Jackie Castillejo as Aunt Ling
- Nina Ricci Alagao as George
- Angel Jacob as Tatet
- Laura James as Thea

== Production ==
=== Development ===
In the early 2000s, Charo Santos-Concio, the executive producer of Star Cinema and then-executive vice president of ABS-CBN Corporation, heard the song "Got to Believe in Magic", sung by David Pomeranz, after which she expressed to others that it would make for a good film title. Mia A. Concio, Charo's stepdaughter who was the chairperson of NBN at the time, first developed the screenplay years before the occurrence of EDSA II. Director Olivia Lamasan, who co-wrote with Concio, denied the rumors that the screenplay was copied from the Jennifer Lopez-Matthew McConaughey starrer, The Wedding Planner.

=== Filming ===
During this stage, Lamasan conceived the idea of Claudine Barretto throwing into the air many times in the discotheque, as she already planned the possible shots. However, it was scrapped because it would cost an additional ₱100,000 (equivalent to ₱201,890 in 2021) to the budget.

== Music ==
Got 2 Believe (Original Motion Picture Soundtrack) track listing
No.	Title	Performer(s)	Length
1.	"Got to Believe in Magic"	Side A	3:55
2.	"I've Fallen for You"	Freshmen	4:12
3.	"Sana Ikaw"	Piolo Pascual; Stagecrew	3:55
4.	"Ikakasal Ka Na"	Jessa Zaragoza	4:51
5.	"Believe in Magic"	Dianne Dela Fuente	4:23
6.	"Nang Dahil Sa Pag-Ibig"	Tootsie Guevarra	4:27
7.	"Na-Develop"	Tin Arnaldo	3:33
8.	"Laging Ikaw Pa Rin"	Roselle Nava	4:27
9.	"Just For That Moment"	Jimmy Bondoc	4:22
10.	"Sana Ikaw"	Stagecrew	4:16
11.	"Game Ka Na Ba (Bonus Track)"	N/A	N/A
12.	"Got to Believe in Magic (Bonus Track)"	Rico Yan and Claudine Barretto	3:35

The soundtrack is copyrighted and exclusively distributed by Star Recording Inc.

== Release ==
The film was theatrically released on February 27, 2002. It received a free-to-air television premiere on June 29, 2003, as a feature presentation for ABS-CBN's Super Movie Special.

== Reception ==
=== Critical response ===
Gay Ace Domingo, writing for The Philippine Star, praised and described the film as "an entertaining love story", stating that it "tastes as sweet as candy". In technical aspects, Sarte's cinematography was praised for giving a lustrous quality that would look like a fairytale. She also gave praise to the acting performances of the cast, particularly Barretto and Yan's romantic chemistry, Navarro's perfect delivery of comedic timing, and Ochoa's most endearing role.

=== Accolades ===
Award-giving organization	Date	Category	Recipient(s)	Result	Ref.
21st FAP Awards	March 29, 2003	Best Actor	Rico Yan	Nominated	
21st FAP Awards	March 29, 2003	Best Production Design	Noel Crisostomo Naval	Nominated	

== Legacy ==
Got 2 Believe is considered by critics as one of the greatest Filipino romantic movies of all time. Its movie structure has been a guideline and staple for Filipino romantic movies.
