= Tigasin =

- Directed by: Ike Jarlego Jr.
- Written by: Mel Mendoza-del Rosario
- Produced by: Eric M. Cuatico
- Starring: Eddie Garcia; Victor Neri
- Cinematography: Jun Pereira
- Edited by: Marya Ignacio
- Music by: Nonong Buencamino
- Production company: Star Cinema
- Distributed by: Star Cinema
- Release date: June 23, 1999 (Manila)
- Running time: 94 minutes
- Country: Philippines
- Language: Filipino

Tigasin (transl. Harden) is a 1999 Filipino action comedy film directed by Ike Jarlego Jr. from a screenplay by Mel Mendoza-del Rosario. Starring Victor Neri and Eddie Garcia, it was released on June 23, 1999 as one of the entries in the 1999 Manila Film Festival.

The film is streaming online on YouTube.

== Plot ==
2 police officers are investigating the string of mysterious deaths due to fake Viagra being sold illegally. They suspect a group of roving merchants, which lead them to the source. Despite killing the ringleader, they find out that a slew of victims are seduced by a mysterious woman, which is revealed to be the true ringleader.

== Cast ==
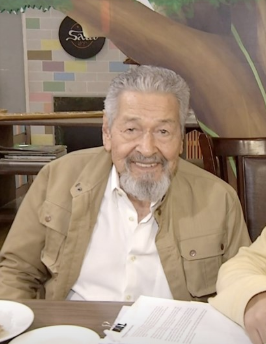
Eddie Garcia portrays Sgt. Gregorio Marcial

- Eddie Garcia as Sgt. Greg Marcial
- Victor Neri as Cpl. Ramon Ignacio
- Alma Concepcion as Jessica
- Alvin Anson as Rex
- Peque Gallaga as Mr. Pablo
- Lito Legaspi as Col. Angeles
- Manjo del Mundo as Lt.Carlos
- Rez Cortez as Roxas
- Jean Saburit as Mrs. Roxas
- Amy Perez as Bisayang Promo Lady
- Roldan Aquino as Mr. Khorami
- Archi Adamos as Driver
- Gino Paul Guzman as Lookout
- Augusto Victa as Lolo
- Dexter Doria as Mrs. Santos
- Ester Chavez as Victim's Wife
- Ogie Diaz as Gay Attendant
- Idda Yaneza as Mrs. Reale
- Gandong Cervantes as Mr. Antonio
- Robert Talby as Wilfredo
- Ed Aquino as Chemist
- Archie Ventosa as Lab Personnel
- Nikka Ruiz as Promo Head
- Janet Diaz as Twiggy
- Gloria Garcia as Tomboy
- Joseph dela Paz as Fat Cook
- Janice Manuba as Assistant Chemist
- Eric Jimenez as Bert
- Kevin Cabaluna as Reporter
- Dianne Sandico as Young Prostitute
- Apolinario Reyes as Dead Lolo
- Jenny de Guzman as Club Dancer
- Danny Celis as Dead Husband
- Reggie Sison as Dead Gay
