= Pangako... Ikaw Lang =

2001 Filipino romance film

- Official movie poster
- Directed by: Binibining Joyce Bernal
- Written by: Mel Mendoza-del Rosario
- Produced by: Vicente G. del Rosario III
- Starring: Aga Muhlach; Regine Velasquez
- Cinematography: Charlie Peralta
- Edited by: Joyce Bernal
- Music by: Raul Mitra
- Production company: Viva Films
- Distributed by: Viva Films
- Release dates: July 3, 2001 (Alabang Town Center); July 4, 2001
- Country: Philippines
- Language: Filipino

Pangako... Ikaw Lang (lit. 'Promise... it is only you') is a 2001 Filipino romance film edited and directed by Joyce Bernal from a screenplay by Mel Mendoza-del Rosario. It stars Aga Muhlach and Regine Velasquez, and was produced by Viva Films. Released on July 4, 2001, it was a success at the box office.

== Synopsis ==
Vince, a womanizer suffered from coma after a car accident. Cristina, a flower shop owner, took care of her sick father who was admitted in the same hospital with Vince. Visiting her father, Christina saw Vince and got the uncanny feeling of wanting to talk to him while he was sleeping. Eventually, Vince woke up and saw Christina and was drawn to her instantly. He had to make a tough decision of marrying his long-time girlfriend or pursuing a romantic relationship with Christina.

== Cast ==
- Aga Muhlach as Vince
- Regine Velasquez as Cristina
- Bobby Andrews as Bert
- Bojo Molina as Victor
- Robert Arevalo as Papa
- Evangeline Pascual as Mrs. Pascual
- Sherilyn Reyes as Annie
- Charlie Davao as Mr. Pascual
- Dencio Padilla Jr. as Jun
- Ricci Ocampo as Krystel
- Rufa Mae Quinto as Peachy
- Jaya
- Louie Manansala as Krystel's mother
- Mari Barvicui as Daphne

== Production ==
Under director Joyce Bernal, Catherine O. Camarillo served as assistant director. The film was shot at the Alabang Town Center mall in Muntinlupa, Metro Manila.

== Soundtrack ==
Pangako... Ikaw Lang: Original Motion Picture Soundtrack

Soundtrack album by Regine Velasquez
- Released: May 2001
- Label: Viva Records
- Producer: Regine Velasquez; Raul Mitra

Regine Velasquez chronology
| Kailangan Ko'y Ikaw (2000) | Pangako... Ikaw Lang: Original Motion Picture Soundtrack (2001) | Reigne (2001) |

Singles from Pangako... Ikaw Lang: Original Motion Picture Soundtrack
- 1. "Pangako" Released: 2001

Viva Records released the film's soundtrack in May 2001, two months prior to the film's premiere. A week after its release, the album was certified gold by the Philippine Association of the Record Industry (PARI). Although several cast members were featured in the soundtrack, leading actor Aga Muhlach lightly noted in an interview that he was left out by Viva Records of providing vocals for any of the film's songs.

| No. | Title | Writer(s) | Length |
|---|---|---|---|
| 1. | "Pangako" | Ogie Alcasid |
| 2. | "With a Smile" | Ely Buendia |
| 3. | "Itutuloy" | Moy Ortiz; Edith M. Gallardo |
| 4. | "Someone to Watch Over Me" (duet with Robert Arevalo) | George Gershwin; Ira Gershwin |
| 5. | "Kailan Pa Man" | Lisa Dy; Chat Zamora |
| 6. | "Tanging Mahal" | Girl Valencia |
| 7. | "Your Friend" (featuring Dianne Velasquez) | Archie Clemente |
| 8. | "Sana Nga" | Babsie Molina; Edith Gallardo |
| 9. | "Now That We're Closer" (featuring Raul Mitra) | Junn Sta. Maria; Peewee Apostol |
| 10. | "Bakit Ngayon Ka Lang" (featuring Jaya) | Ogie Alcasid; Aaron Paul del Rosario |
| 11. | "Thank You for Being My Friend" (featuring Sherilyn Reyes) | M. Garcia; C. Buena |
| 12. | "Someone to Watch Over Me" | George Gershwin; Ira Gershwin |

== Release ==
Pangako... Ikaw Lang held its premiere at the Alabang Town Center in Muntinlupa on July 3, 2001, and began its general theatrical release a day later.

=== Box office ===
Pangako... Ikaw Lang was a box office hit.

=== Critical reception ===
Nestor U. Torre, writing for the Philippine Daily Inquirer, gave the film a mildly positive review, calling it "light, deft and charming" but criticizing the "diffuse" storytelling that lessened its quality compared to Dahil May Isang Ikaw, Bernal's previous film with Muhlach and Velasquez from 1999.

Filmmakers Paul Daza and Jade Castro wrote a favorable review of the film for the Philippine Daily Inquirer, deeming it to have the "best vibes" out of all the films released in 2001 and managing to avoid being a mere imitation of Hollywood films, stating that "'Pangako' was that rare blockbuster that actually deserved its success."

== See also ==
- Of All the Things, a 2012 film also directed by Bernal, written by Mendoza-del Rosario, and starring Muhlach and Velasquez
