= Campus Girls =

1995 drama film by Mac Alejandre

- Directed by: Mac Alejandre
- Written by: Mel Mendoza-del Rosario; Shaira Mella Salvador
- Produced by: William C. Leary
- Starring: Vina Morales; Donna Cruz; Donita Rose; Geneva Cruz
- Cinematography: Eduardo Jacinto
- Edited by: Ike Jarlego Jr.
- Music by: Ricky del Rosario
- Production company: Viva Films
- Distributed by: Viva Films
- Release date: January 25, 1995
- Running time: 110 minutes
- Country: Philippines
- Language: Filipino

Campus Girls is a 1995 Philippine drama film directed by Mac Alejandre in his feature directorial debut. The film stars Vina Morales, Donna Cruz, Donita Rose and Geneva Cruz as the titular kolehiyalas.

The film is streaming online on YouTube.

== Plot ==
Vangie, Georgie, Samantha, and Diane are the best of friends who encounter different journeys in life as they go through college. Their friendship gets tested when Diane and Georgie fight over the affections of college heartthrob Louie, while Samantha discovers that Vangie is her dad's young mistress.

== Cast ==
- Vina Morales as Vangie
- Donna Cruz as Georgie
- Donita Rose as Samantha
- Geneva Cruz as Diane
- Chanda Romero as Aling Pilar
- Gary Estrada as Bogs
- Marjorie Barretto as Margie
- Elizabeth Oropesa as Becky
- Dante Rivero as Andy
- Caridad Sanchez as Mamoo
- Ian de Leon as Louie
- Ronaldo Valdez as Ramon
- Lander Vera-Perez as Mike
- Alona Alegre as Cory
- Amy Austria as Criselda
- Richard Bonnin as Dante
- Gina Alajar as Mrs. Rosales
- James Apilado as Boyet
- Shaina Magdayao as Bunny
- Michael Vera-Perez as Michael
- Rommel Montano as Rommel
- Jaymee Hizon as Jaimee
- Erwin as Erwin
- Joemar Cruz as Joey
- Charmaigne Santanera as Myrna
- Milina Jacoway as Jenny
- Jessa Zaragoza as Pinky
- Richard de Dios as Francis
- Noni Mauricio as Chito
- Lennon Serrano as Lennon
- Kenneth Garcia as Kenneth

== Production ==
Campus Girls is the first Viva Films project of screenwriter Mel Mendoza-del Rosario, the wife of composer Ricky del Rosario.

== Release ==
Vina Morales walked out of Campus Girls's premiere on January 25, 1995, after realizing that most of her scenes were edited out of the film.
