= The Borrowed Wife =

2014 Philippine television drama series

- Title card
- Genre: Romantic drama
- Created by: Rey Leoncito
- Written by: Ken de Leon; Cristine Novicio; Angeli Delgado
- Directed by: Gil Tejada Jr.
- Creative director: Jun Lana
- Starring: Camille Prats; Rafael Rosell
- Opening theme: "Pinakamamahal" by Maricris Garcia
- Country of origin: Philippines
- Original language: Tagalog
- No. of episodes: 88

Production
- Executive producer: Michele Borja
- Production locations: Quezon City, Philippines
- Camera setup: Multiple-camera setup
- Running time: 25–34 minutes
- Production company: GMA Entertainment TV

Original release
- Network: GMA Network
- Release: January 20 – May 23, 2014

The Borrowed Wife is a 2014 Philippine television drama romance series broadcast by GMA Network. Directed by Gil Tejada Jr., it stars Camille Prats in the title role and Rafael Rosell. It premiered on January 20, 2014 on the network's Afternoon Prime line up. The series concluded on May 23, 2014, with a total of 88 episodes.

The series is streaming online on YouTube.

== Cast and characters ==
Cast

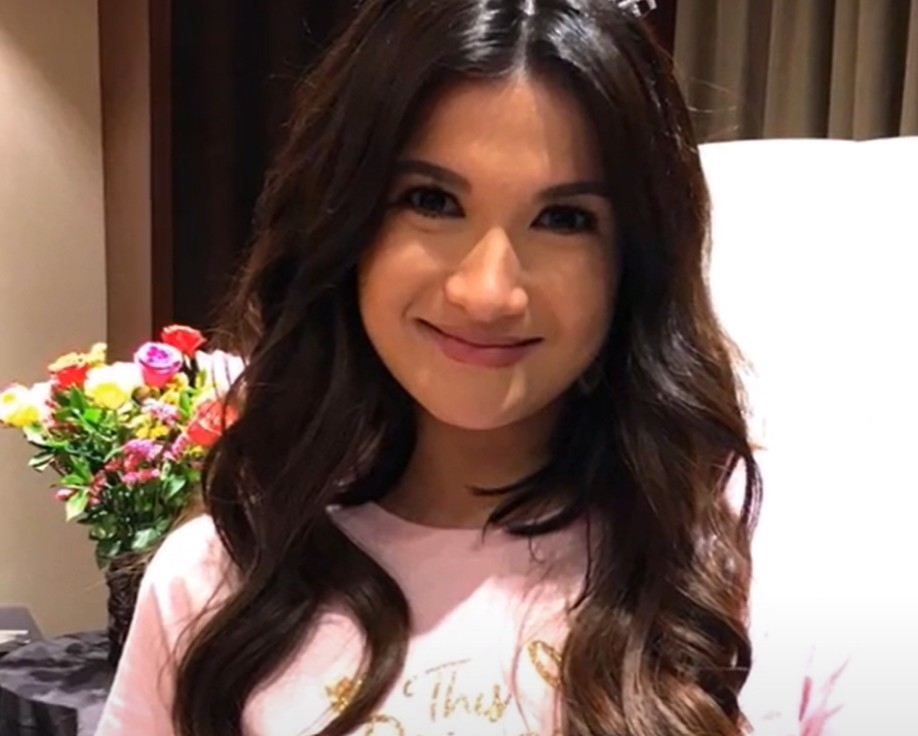
Camille Prats

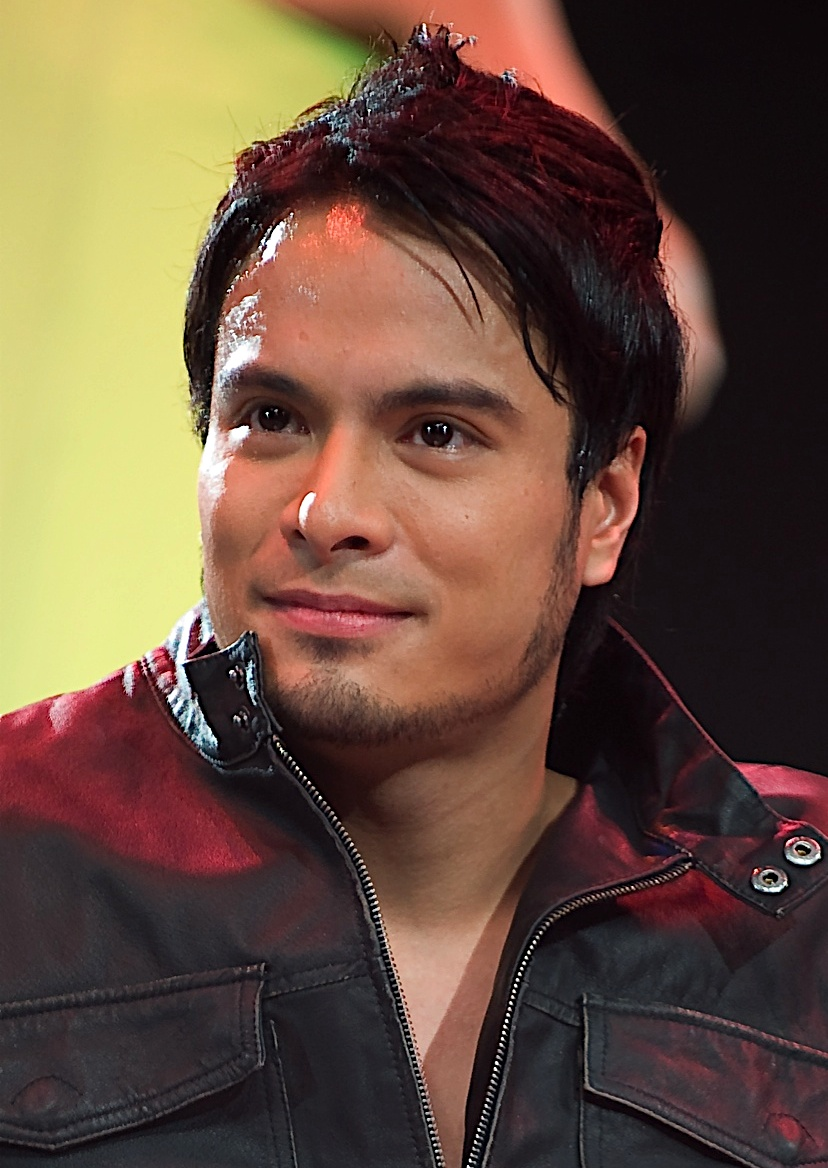
Rafael Rosell

Lead cast

- Camille Prats as Sophia Gonzales-Villaraza / Maria Carlotta "Maricar" Perez-Santos
- Rafael Rosell as Ricardo "Rico" Santos

Supporting cast

- Charee Pineda as Maria Carlotta "Maricar" Perez-Santos / Sandra Navarro / Slilvia "Sylvia" Ignacio
- TJ Trinidad as Eduardo "Earl" Villaraza
- Pauleen Luna as Teresa Victoria "Tessa" Pelaez-Santos
- Yayo Aguila as Imelda "Elda" Santos
- Sherilyn Reyes-Tan as Mimi Perez-Garcia
- Kevin Santos as Jorrel Geraldes
- Diego Castro as Carlo Solaez
- Lou Sison as Jenny
- Rhed Bustamante as Joanna Santos
- Zarah Mae Deligero as Denden Garcia
- Caridad Sanchez as Celing
- Jojit Lorenzo as Biboy Manalo

Guest cast

- Frances Makil-Ignacio as Olive
- Philip Lazaro as Mickey
- Yassi Pressman as Wendy Contessa
- Gian Magdangal as Gerard
- Mel Martinez as Pat
- Patricia Ismael as Beatrice "Bea" Terrazo
- JC Tiuseco as Larry
- Arthur Solinap as Rex

== Production ==
Principal photography concluded on May 16, 2014.

== Ratings ==
According to AGB Nielsen Philippines' Mega Manila household television ratings, the pilot episode of The Borrowed Wife earned a 12.6% rating. The final episode scored a 17.2% rating.
