= Chin-Chin Gutierrez =

Filipina actress and model

- Born: Carminia Lourdes Cynthia Arnaldo Gutierrez; August 22, 1969 (age 57)
- Other name: Maria Jose Arnaldo
- Education: Miriam College (BA); Southeast Asia Interdisciplinary Development Institute (MA, Ph.D.)
- Occupations: Actress and model
- Years active: 1992–2015 (actress)
- Height: 163 cm (5 ft 4 in)

Carminia Lourdes Cynthia Arnaldo Gutierrez (born August 22, 1969), better known as Chin-Chin Gutierrez, is a Filipino retired actress and an environmentalist.

Gutierrez starred in a number of films during the 1990s, among them are Maalaala Mo Kaya: The Movie (1994), Sa Aking Mga Kamay (1996) and April, May and June (1998) for Star Cinema.

She is best known as Marla in the romance drama Ikaw Pala Ang Mahal Ko (1997) and as Josephine Bracken in Jose Rizal (1998). In the 2000s, she further gained recognition for her antagonistic roles in the popular soap operas Habang Kapiling Ka (2002-2003), Krystala (2004), Maging Sino Ka Man (2006-2008), and Dahil May Isang Ikaw (2009-2010).

== Personal life ==
Gutierrez is the daughter of botanist Hermes Gutierrez and painter Cecilia Arnaldo. Cecilia was a former Franciscan nun who served in Italy.

She earned her bachelor’s degree in Communication Arts, graduating cum laude from Miriam College. She subsequently enrolled in a combined MA/PhD program in Organizational Development, major in Transformative Spirituality, at the Southeast Asia Interdisciplinary Development Institute (SAIDI), which she recently completed. She also earned a Master of Arts in Theological Studies, with a specialization in Biblical Theology, from the Loyola School of Theology.

== Career ==
Gutierrez was initially known for her television commercials. She had a break in televesion when she starred in the 1992 series Noli me Tangere by director Eddie Romero. Billed as Maria Jose Arnaldo, she played the role of Maria Clara.

Gutierrez is noted for playing antagonistic roles in the ABS-CBN television series Dahil May Isang Ikaw and Maging Sino Ka Man. She also had roles in feature films. Her last television appearance was in 2010.

She retired from acting in 2015.

== Music ==
In late 2003, Gutierrez released, after two years in the making, an album of her versions of lullabies from around the Philippine archipelago, in around half a dozen languages and dialects, including Hiligaynon, Waray, Cebuano, Bicol, Tagalog and others. The album, UYAYI: A Collection of Philippine Lullabies, was the result of field research capturing sound recordings of elders around the country singing their traditional songs for the youth, then a process of laborious re-recording of the songs, accompanied by Pinoy musicians such as Bo Razon, Joey Ayala, Tots Tolentino, Malou Matute and Rachel Conanan. The double CD includes one CD of her music, and one of the field recordings, plus a short video of the making. It has won several awards, received a National Commission for Culture and the Arts grant, and was the focus of a few music showcases.

== Advocacy ==
Gutierrez is the founding chair and president of the ecological foundation Alaga LAHAT, which she created in 2006. This organization was a member of the Eco-Waste Coalition. Previous to having her own group, she was also a founding member and officer of Mother Earth Foundation.

A vegetarian, she starred in an ad for PETA Asia-Pacific in which she said that "fish are friends, not food".

== Post-retirement ==
Gutierrez went private after her retirement and has not maintained presence in social media. She is rumored to have become a Carmelite sister or nun but there is no confirmation of this claim as of 2021.

== Filmography ==
=== Film ===
Year	Title	Role	Notes
1991	Onyong Majikero	Sheila	
1992	Bakit Labis Kitang Mahal	Cynthia / Michelle / Maria Jose Arnaldo	
1993	Di Na Natuto (Sorry Na, Pwede Ba?)	Gina	
1994	Maalaala Mo Kaya: The Movie	Marissa	
1994	Johnny Guess: Ang Taong Laging Nagtatanong	Stephanie	
1994	Lagalag: The Eddie Fernandez Story	Rosie	
1995	Escobar (Walang Sasantuhin)	Norma Lopez	
1995	Ipaglaban Mo: The Movie	Gilda Ortega	
1996	Mula Noon, Hanggang Ngayon		
1996	Sa Aking mga Kamay	Camille dela Rosa	
1996	Bloo	Claire	
1997	Ikaw Pala ang Mahal Ko	Maria	
1998	Bayad Puri		
1998	Sa Pusod ng Dagat	Mrs. Santiago	
1998	April, May, June	May	
1998	My Guardian Debil		
1998	Ama Namin	Ka Riza	
1998	Legacy	Grace	
1998	Jose Rizal	Josephine Bracken	
2000	Pedrong Palad	Rose	
2000	Umaga, Tanghali, Gabi		Television film
2001	Tatarin	Paeng's mother	
2003	Tomagan		
2005	Rigodon	Salome	
2006	The Mourning Girls	Carmen	
2006	Pandanggo	Claire	
2007	A Love Story	Concha	
2007	I've Fallen for You	Tessa Tamano Reyes	
2008	Cul de Sac	Lyra	
2015	Watawat (The Flag)	Marcela Agoncillo	

=== Television ===
Year	Title	Role	Notes
1993	Noli Me Tangere	Maria Clara de los Santos	Billed as Maria Jose Arnaldo
1995	Melinda	Melinda	
1996	Bayani	Teresa Magbanua	
1997	Desaparacido		
2002	Habang Kapiling Ka	Helga Lamermoore	Supporting role / antagonist
2004	Krystala	Super Z / Zora / Zorina	
2005	Komiks Presents: Valentina	Valentina's mother	
2006	Komiks Presents: Da Adventures of Pedro Penduko	Minokawa	
2007	Maging Sino Ka Man	Corazon Roxas vda. de Berenguer	Supporting role / antagonist
2008	Maging Sino Ka Man: Ang Pagbabalik	Corazon Roxas-Romualdez	Supporting role / antagonist
2009	Maalaala Mo Kaya: Tasa	Ellen	
2009	Dahil May Isang Ikaw	Patricia Aragon - Alferos	Lead role / antagonist
2009	Maalaala Mo Kaya: Isda	Coring / Corita	Lead role
2009–2010	May Bukas Pa	Teresa Malimban	Guest role
2010	Precious Hearts Romances Presents: Kristine	Kristine Esmeralda Lopez-Fortalejo	Special participation
2010	Maalaala Mo Kaya: Wedding Ring	Flor	Lead role
2023	Cattleya Killer	Camille dela Rosa	Archive footage

== Awards and recognition ==
2004

- Recipient of the TOWNS (The Outstanding Women in the Nation's Service) Award for her environmental advocacy.

Year	Award giving body	Category	Nominated work	Results
1995	Gawad Urian	Best Supporting Actress	Maalaala Mo Kaya: The Movie	Won
1996	Asian Television Award	Best Actress	Melinda	Won
1996	FAMAS Award	Best Actress	Redeem Her Honor	Nominated
1997	FAMAS Award	Best Actress	Sa Aking mga Kamay	Nominated
1998	Asian Television Award	Best Supporting Actress	Desaparacido	Won
1999	Gawad Urian	Best Supporting Actress	Sa Pusod ng Dagat	Nominated
1999	FAMAS Award	Best Supporting Actress	Ama Namin	Nominated
2003	Time Asia	Asian Heroes	—N/a	Included
2007	MYX Music Awards	Favorite Guest Appearance in a Music Video	"Pintura" by Kjwan	Won
