= Sana Maulit Muli (film) =

1995 film by Olivia M. Lamasan

- Theatrical release poster
- Directed by: Olivia M. Lamasan
- Screenplay by: Olivia M. Lamasan; Mel Mendoza-del Rosario; Shaira Mella Salvador
- Story by: Jose Javier Reyes; Olivia M. Lamasan
- Produced by: Malou N. Santos; Simon C. Ongpin
- Starring: Lea Salonga; Aga Muhlach
- Cinematography: Romeo Vitug
- Edited by: George Jarlego
- Music by: Willy Cruz
- Production company: Star Cinema
- Distributed by: ABS-CBN Film Productions
- Release date: August 9, 1995
- Running time: 120 minutes
- Countries: Philippines; United States
- Language: Filipino

Sana Maulit Muli (lit. 'Hope It Happens Again') is a 1995 Filipino romantic drama film directed by Olivia M. Lamasan and co-written by Jose Javier Reyes, Mel Mendoza-del Rosario, and Shaira Mella Salvador. Starring Lea Salonga and Aga Muhlach, in their second film together after Bakit Labis Kitang Mahal in 1992, the story follows two lovers whose long-distance relationship drifted them apart.

Produced and distributed by Star Cinema, the film was theatrically released on August 9, 1995. In celebration of its 20th anniversary, it was digitally restored and remastered by ABS-CBN Film Restoration and Central Digital Lab and was screened at the Cine Adarna, University of the Philippines Film Institute.

== Plot ==
Agnes is a meek and dependent girl living with her long-time boyfriend, Jerry. When she is invited to live with her estranged mother in California, Jerry pushes her to go through with the trip despite her protests for him to focus on his work and build his career as an advertising executive. Agnes struggles to survive in the United States and tries several times to return to the country, but Jerry insists on prolonging her stay as he struggles to save up for their marriage and support his parents and siblings. He encourages her to get a job, and Agnes starts working as a caregiver. Agnes tries to convince Jerry to let her return and reasons that she has the money to support herself, but Jerry insists that as the man of the relationship, he should be capable of supporting her. Jerry starts to avoid Agnes, stressing Agnes out more. The long distance puts a strain on their relationship and ultimately ends when a scared and distraught Agnes is unable to contact Jerry after being put in danger one night. Time passes, and Agnes becomes more independent and outgoing, working hard until she lands a job as a real estate agent.

Meanwhile, Jerry travels to the United States and visits Agnes, intending to get her back. Jerry is overwhelmed by the cultural differences between the United States and the Philippines, Agnes's success in her career, and the changes in Agnes herself. Despite this, they still manage to mend their relationship, but Jerry accepts that he is simply unsuited for the kind of lifestyle they have in the United States. He leaves Agnes and decides to return home to the Philippines.

Days later, Jerry returned to his former job in the advertising agency. After the work was done, he walked alone in the busy street. Suddenly, he noticed in the back that Agnes had returned to the Philippines. The two were happily reunited, and they walked together as the screen slowly faded.

== Cast ==
- Aga Muhlach as Gerardo "Jerry" Morales
- Lea Salonga as Agnes Sarmiento
- William Martinez as Nick
- Tina Paner as Daisy
- Rosemarie Sonora as Sylvia
- Cherry Pie Picache as Cynthia
- Tommy Abuel as Ben
- Gina Pareño as Lita
- Lorli Villanueva as Tiya Nena
- Raul Aragon as Rolly
- Ric Arellano as Carding
- Eula Valdez as Margie
- Lorenzo Mara as Tony
- Mandy Ochoa as Chito
- Bill Recana as Dave Whitman
- Keith Fazackerley as Steve

== Production ==
The film was shot in the Philippines and San Francisco, California. Some scenes that were set in the United States were shot in Baguio due to the presence of the pine trees and log cabins in the penultimate part of the film.

Olivia M. Lamasan, the film's director, was 32 years old at the time of its production, and Sana Maulit Muli was her first romantic drama film and second film to be directed by Lamasan herself. Producer Malou N. Santos later expressed that Sana Maulit Muli was the last film she was "100 percent hands-on" as a producer, and cited it as one of Star Cinema's film productions that "really left a lasting impression on me".

== Music ==
The film's theme song "Sana Maulit Muli" was originally written by Gary Valenciano in English, and it was a tribute to the late young actress Julie Vega, who died in 1985. His wife, Angeli Pangilinan-Valenciano, translated the song into Filipino.

== Release ==
The film was first screened in theaters on August 9, 1995. It is the first film of Star Cinema to be made abroad and their first film featuring overseas Filipino workers.

=== Digital restoration ===
In 2015, the film was digitally restored with the help of ABS-CBN Film Archives and Central Digital Lab, supervised by Manet A. Dayrit and Rick Hawthorne, who started working on its restoration as early as 2013. It was screened at the Cine Adarna, University of the Philippines Film Institute on July 10. The premiere of the restored version was attended by the film's director Olivia M. Lamasan; the lead stars Aga Muhlach and Lea Salonga; Aga Muhlach's wife Charlene Gonzales-Muhlach and their twin children Andres and Atasha; director Joyce Bernal, and ABS-CBN's Head of Creative Communications Management, Robert Labayen.

=== Home media and television broadcast ===
Regal Home Video released the film on VHS in 1995, and the VCD version was released in 2002 through Star Home Video. The restored version of the film was released through iTunes on September 21, 2015, in the selected territories: US, UK, Japan, Israel, Taiwan, Hong Kong, Vietnam, Thailand, Macau and the Philippines.

It also received a television premiere on ABS-CBN on Maundy Thursday, March 24, 2016, at 10:00 PM, and the showing received a nationwide rating of 9.2%, losing to GMA Network's Holy Week showing of the 2013 Korean film Miracle in Cell No. 7, which attained a nationwide rating of 14.6%.

== Reception ==
=== Critical reception ===
Lily Grace Tabanera of Cosmopolitan Philippines called Sana Maulit Muli a classic after observing the pros and cons of the characters Jerry and Agnes and their development. According to her, this film can serve as a lesson for those who are in a long-distance relationship and a recommendation for the members of Gen Z who haven't seen it.

=== Accolades ===
Year	Award	Category	Recipient	Result
1996
1996	44th FAMAS Awards	Best Picture	Sana Maulit Muli	Nominated
1996	44th FAMAS Awards	Best Director	Olivia M. Lamasan	Nominated
1996	44th FAMAS Awards	Best Actor	Aga Muhlach	Nominated
1996	44th FAMAS Awards	Best Actress	Lea Salonga	Nominated
1996	44th FAMAS Awards	Best Theme Song	"Sana Maulit Muli" by Gary Valenciano	Won
1996	19th Gawad Urian Awards	Best Picture	Sana Maulit Muli	Won
1996	19th Gawad Urian Awards	Best Director	Olivia M. Lamasan	Nominated
1996	19th Gawad Urian Awards	Best Screenplay	Olivia M. Lamasan; Mel Mendoza-del Rosario; Shaira Mella Salvador	Won
1996	19th Gawad Urian Awards	Best Actor	Aga Muhlach	Won
1996	19th Gawad Urian Awards	Best Actress	Lea Salonga	Nominated
1996	19th Gawad Urian Awards	Best Production Design	Randy Gamier	Won
1996	19th Gawad Urian Awards	Best Cinematography	Romeo Vitug	Nominated
1996	19th Gawad Urian Awards	Best Editing	George Jarlego	Nominated
1996	19th Gawad Urian Awards	Best Music	Willy Cruz	Nominated
1996	19th Gawad Urian Awards	Best Sound	Ramon Reyes	Nominated
1996	13th Luna Awards	Best Picture	Sana Maulit Muli	Nominated
1996	13th Luna Awards	Best Director	Olivia M. Lamasan	Nominated
1996	13th Luna Awards	Best Screenplay	Olivia M. Lamasan; Mel Mendoza-del Rosario; Shaira Mella Salvador	Won
1996	13th Luna Awards	Best Actor	Aga Muhlach	Nominated
1996	13th Luna Awards	Best Production Design	Randy Gamier	Won
1996	13th Luna Awards	Best Cinematography	Romeo Vitug	Won
1996	13th Luna Awards	Best Editing	George Jarlego	Nominated
1996	Star Awards for Movies	Original Screenplay of the Year	Shaira Mella Salvador	Won
1996	YCC Awards	Best Film	Olivia M. Lamasan	Nominated
1996	YCC Awards	Best Screenplay	Olivia M. Lamasan; Jose Javier Reyes; Mel Mendoza-del Rosario; Shaira Mella Salvador	Nominated
1996	YCC Awards	Best Performance by Male or Female, Adult or Child, Individual or Ensemble in Leading or Supporting Role	Aga Muhlach	Nominated
1996	YCC Awards	Best Achievement in Cinematography and Visual Design	Romeo Vitug	Nominated
1996	YCC Awards	Best Achievement in Cinematography and Visual Design	Randy Gamier	Nominated
