= Moms (talk show) =

Philippine television talk show

- Title card
- Genre: Talk show
- Presented by: Manilyn Reynes; Sherilyn Reyes; Lani Mercado
- Country of origin: Philippines
- Original language: Tagalog
- No. of episodes: 825

Production
- Executive producer: Jose Mari Abacan
- Producer: Wilma Galvante
- Camera setup: Multiple-camera setup
- Running time: 42 minutes
- Production company: GMA Entertainment TV

Original release
- Network: QTV/Q
- Release: November 11, 2005 – January 16, 2009

Moms is a Philippine television talk show broadcast by QTV. Hosted by Manilyn Reynes, Sherilyn Reyes and Lani Mercado, it premiered on November 11, 2005. The show concluded on January 16, 2009, with a total of 825 episodes.

== Hosts ==
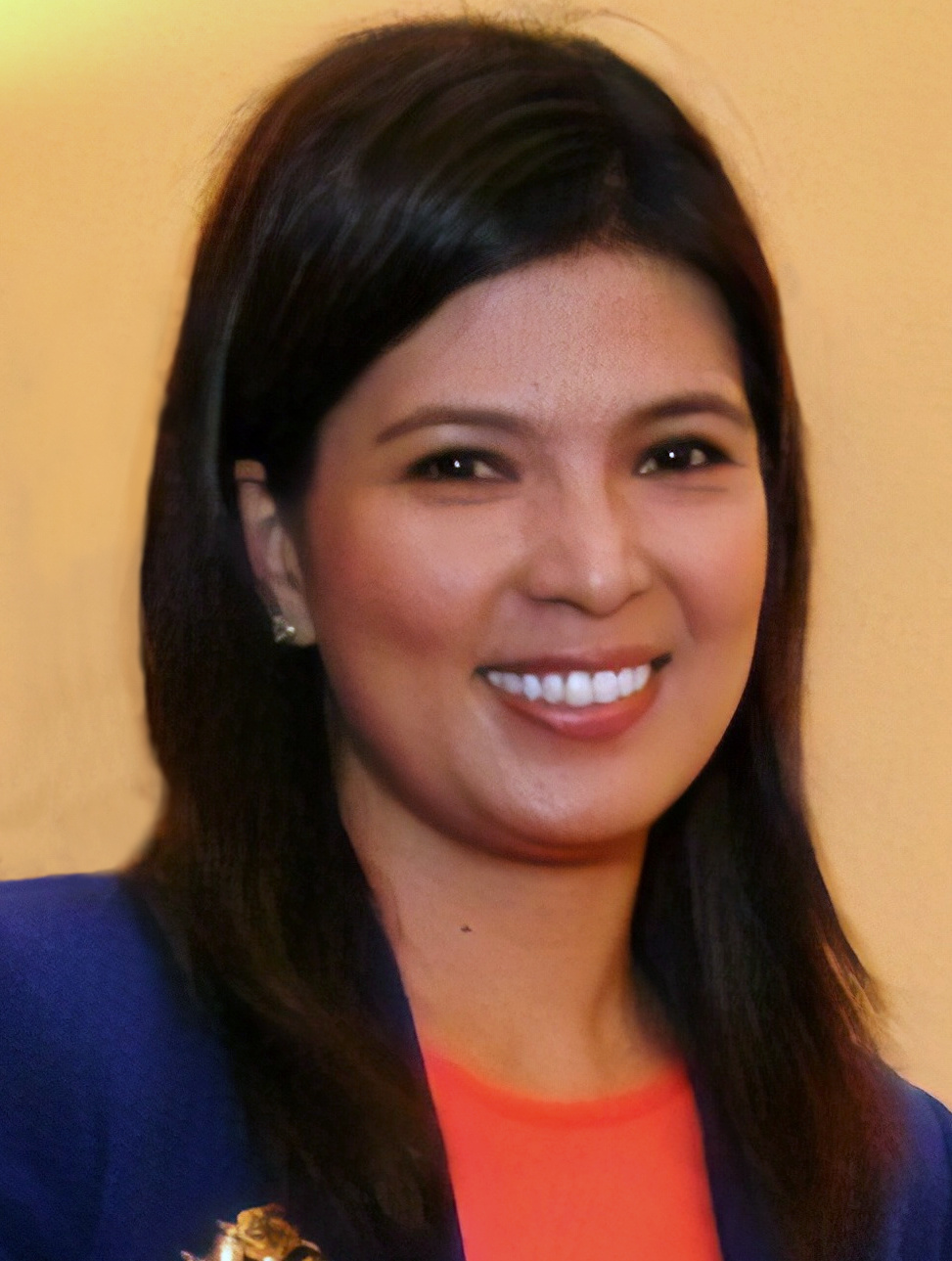
Lani Mercado serves as a host.

- Manilyn Reynes
- Sherilyn Reyes
- Lani Mercado

== Accolades ==
Accolades received by Moms
Year	Award	Category	Recipient	Result	Ref.
2009	7th Gawad Tanglaw	Best Family Oriented Talk Show	Moms	Won	
