= Cattleya Killer =

2023 Filipino television series

- Promotional poster
- Also known as: The Rebirth of the Cattleya Killer
- Genre: Psychological thriller; Action; Drama; Crime; Mystery
- Written by: Dodo Dayao
- Directed by: Dan Villegas; Irene Emma Villamor
- Creative director: Ruel S. Bayani
- Starring: Arjo Atayde; Jake Cuenca; Christopher de Leon; Jane Oineza; Ria Atayde; Ricky Davao; Nonie Buencamino; Zsa Zsa Padilla
- Music by: Len Calvo
- Country of origin: Philippines
- Original languages: Filipino; English
- No. of episodes: 6

Production
- Executive producers: Carlo L. Katigbak; Cory V. Vidanes; Laurenti M. Dyogi
- Producers: Arjo Atayde; Ria Atayde; Sylvia Sanchez
- Production location: Philippines
- Cinematography: Pao Orendain
- Editor: Marya Ignacio
- Running time: 40–50 minutes
- Production companies: ABS-CBN Studios; ABS-CBN International Productions; Nathan Studios

Original release
- Network: Amazon Prime Video
- Release: June 1, 2023

Related
- Sa Aking mga Kamay

Cattleya Killer is a Philippine psychological thriller drama television series directed by Dan Villegas. The series stars Arjo Atayde, with Jake Cuenca, Christopher de Leon, Jane Oineza, Ria Atayde, Ricky Davao, Nonie Buencamino and Zsa Zsa Padilla also starring. It is the sequel to the 1996 Star Cinema film Sa Aking mga Kamay.

The series premiered on Amazon Prime Video on June 1, 2023.

== Plot ==
Two decades after the infamous Cattleya Killer case, the man who cracked the case, Joven dela Rosa (Christopher de Leon), is now NBI Deputy Director. His youngest son, Anton (Arjo Atayde), is one of his top agents, while his eldest, Benjie (Jake Cuenca), runs a foundation for traumatized women. After a young woman's body is discovered, bearing the same markings as the long-dead Cattleya Killer, the lives of the three men, and everyone around them, are thrown into turmoil. Dark secrets are brought forward, as the line between the real world and the unreal blurs. Anton dela Rosa becomes the prime suspect when past traumas and long-buried secrets are brought to light.

== Cast ==
=== Main cast ===
- Arjo Atayde as Anton dela Rosa
  - Enzo Osorio Biag as young Anton
- Jake Cuenca as Benjie dela Rosa
  - Zyren Dela Cruz as teen Benjie
- Christopher de Leon as Joven dela Rosa
- Jane Oineza as Tina Galvez
- Ria Atayde as Micah Tapales
- Ricky Davao as Demet Noble
- Nonie Buencamino as Raffy Canete
- Zsa Zsa Padilla as Aurora 'Auri' Melendez

=== Supporting cast ===
- Ketchup Eusebio as Rigor Salas
- Frances Makil-Ignacio as Lorelei Mumar
- Rafa Siguion-Reyna as Jonty Laurena
- Jojit Lorenzo as Jester/Talek
- Ryan Eigenmann as Gene Rivera
- Lito Pimentel as Randolph
- Cheska Inigo as Sally Vitan
- Joel Saracho as Victor Pescante
- Sandino Martin as Nolet

=== Other cast ===
- Annicka Dolonius as Mazy Fontanilla
- Micah Muñoz as Brylle
- Anne Feo as Atty. Jen Flaminiano
- Abed Green as Jake
- Jarred Jaicten as Pen Acosta
- Allison Smith as Nancy Jane Paterno
- Jellene Geviane De Vera as Bar Waitress
- Jorge Cariño, Zen Hernandez, Niko Baua, Adrian Ayalin and Kori Quintos as News Reporters
- Nikko Natividad as Nonoy Eightball
- Michael Delgado as Ollie
- Teetin Villanueva as Cassie Nolasco
- Zeppi Borromeo as Poling
- Erlinda Gonzalez as Marisa
- Adriann D. Apruebo as Bearish Guy
- Alexa Ocampo as Yvonne (Victim 3)
- Harry Archie Soon as Tricycle Driver

Additionally, appearing via archive footage are Chin-Chin Gutierrez as Camille dela Rosa, Kier Legaspi as Dino, Karl Angelo Legaspi as young Benjie dela Rosa and Rachel Lobanco as Lindy Villegas.

== Episodes ==
No.	Title	Directed by	Written by	Original release date
1	"Dead Flowers"	Dan Villegas	Dodo Dayao	June 1, 2023
A murder that feels eerily similar to a three-decade-old serial killing gets the attention of the cop who closed the case, as well as his son who tries to get involved in the investigation.
2	"Where is My Mind?"	Dan Villegas	Dodo Dayao	June 1, 2023
Anton gets more phone calls from the supposedly dead Gene Rivera and starts thinking he may be losing his mind. A new victim surfaces that points the case closer to the Cattleya Killer.
3	"How You Disappeared Completely"	Dan Villegas	Dodo Dayao	June 1, 2023
While Anton finds the key to solving his cases, Galvez and Lorelei see a pattern in the murder victims. Noble gets a mysterious phone call that may be connected to the serial murder case.
4	"Sleepers"	Dan Villegas	Dodo Dayao	June 1, 2023
Galvez begins to suspect that someone from the bureau is involved in the serial murder. As he agrees to a rendezvous with Jonty, Anton comes to a startling realization.
5	"The Good Son"	Dan Villegas	Dodo Dayao	June 1, 2023
When Raffy starts digging for information about Joven's wife, Camille, he discovers more intriguing facts about the dela Rosas. Micah goes missing, while Anton goes into hiding.
6	"Annihilation and Rebirth"	Dan Villegas	Dodo Dayao	June 1, 2023
Micah struggles to stay alive, while Joven receives shocking news that could put his family in danger. As Anton comes face to face with Gene Rivera, the real Cattleya Killer reveals himself.

== Production ==
=== Development ===
The series is directed by Dan Villegas, written by Dodo Dayao, and executive produced by Ruel S. Bayani.

It was part of the 2021 Full Circle Series Lab, a Southeast Asian talent development initiative by the Film Development Council of the Philippines and French film company Tatino Films, represented by Creative Producer Tanya Bautista and Producer Edgar Joseph Johnson Mallari.

=== Filming ===
Arjo Atayde, the lead star, prepared for his role by watching documentaries, videos and his own research in order to create his character. He explained his acting process saying, “I just tried to get into the character and went with the flow based on instinct. There was a lot of analyzing in the beginning especially when Direk Dan was trying to explain how the character should be portrayed."

Zsa Zsa Padilla, who plays Auri, said she was impressed by how well their producers took care of the whole team, saying “They made sure to stick to the 12-hour work schedule. This is a good thing because this keeps people on their toes. They know everyone is running on a tight schedule and, therefore, they should be professional. It was a breeze to work with everybody. The script was given way ahead, so I had more time to memorize my lines. We also had Zoom meetings where all we did was throw lines."

Jake Cuenca, who plays Benjie, admitted that he had difficulty letting go of his character after filming, saying, "I think I was so stimulated. Like Arjo, I watched documentaries. I practiced day in and day out. I became the character for a time—I even went on an imaginary date with the character of Ms. Zsa Zsa Padilla. I had so much fun doing it that when it ended, it was hard for me to let go."

According to Villegas, the works of Iranian-French cinematographer Darius Khondji were the main inspiration for most of the show's visuals and cinematography. He elaborated by saying, “We did very minimalist lighting, no over the top shots. Those were the visual look that we planned. That was the visual language that we planned. We wanted it to be simple, but rock.”

== Release ==
Cattleya Killer had its international premiere screening at MIPCOM Cannes on October 19, 2022, marking a milestone for Philippine entertainment as it was the first Filipino production to screen at MIPCOM, the world's largest content market. Four days later, the producers received the news that the crime drama series would be carried by Prime Video.

The series had its blue carpet premiere in the Philippines on May 12, 2023, screening its pilot episode, followed by a press conference with the cast and crew.

The series was released on June 1, 2023 on Prime Video, and is available to stream in Southeast Asia, Hong Kong, Taiwan, and other selected territories.

== Marketing ==
The original trailer was released to the public on October 20, 2022 by ABS-CBN.

On May 10, 2023, the cast had a promotional photoshoot, followed by the release of a new official trailer by Prime Video Philippines, showcasing its links to the previous film, Sa Aking mga Kamay. The release date was also revealed as June 1, 2023.

== Awards and nominations ==
Name of the award ceremony, year presented, award category, nominee(s) of the award, and the result of the nomination
Award	Year	Category	Nominee(s) / Work(s)	Result	Ref.
Content Asia Awards	2024	Best Male Lead in a TV Program/Series	Arjo Atayde	Won	
Asia Contents Awards & Global OTT Awards	2023	Best Lead Actor	Arjo Atayde	Nominated	
Asian Academy Creative Awards	2023	Best Actor in a Leading Role (National Winner)	Arjo Atayde	Won	
Asian Academy Creative Awards	2023	Best Cinematography (National Winner)	Pao Orendain	Won	
Asian Academy Creative Awards	2023	Best Drama Series (National Winner)	Cattleya Killer	Won	

== See also ==
- Sa Aking mga Kamay (1996 film)
- List of Amazon Prime Video original programming
- List of Philippine drama series
- List of Philippine television shows
