= Maalaala Mo Kaya: The Movie =

1994 drama film by Olivia M. Lamasan

- Theatrical release poster
- Directed by: Olivia M. Lamasan
- Screenplay by: Shaira Mella-Salvador; Mel Mendoza del Rosario; Don Cuaresma; Olivia M. Lamasan
- Based on: Maalaala Mo Kaya: "Dede Bote" episode by Mac C. Alejandre
- Produced by: Simon C. Ongpin
- Starring: Richard Gomez; Aiko Melendez; Chin Chin Gutierrez; Karl Angelo Legaspi
- Cinematography: Romeo Vitug
- Edited by: Efren Jarlego; Edmund "Bot" Jarlego
- Music by: Willy Cruz
- Production company: Star Cinema
- Release date: June 22, 1994
- Running time: 107 minutes
- Country: Philippines
- Language: Filipino

Maalaala Mo Kaya: The Movie (stylized as Maalaala mo kaya... THE MOVIE), also known as MMK: The Movie, is a 1994 Filipino drama film co-written and directed by Olivia M. Lamasan in her feature directorial debut. A film adaptation of the ABS-CBN television series of the same name, it is a remake of the episode "Dede Bote" directed by Mac C. Alejandre, which itself was based on the life of an ordinary Filipino citizen detailed in a letter sent to the program. Starring Richard Gomez, Aiko Melendez, Chin-Chin Gutierrez and child actor Karl Angelo Legaspi, the story follows two cousins: a surrogate mother (Melendez) and a birth mother working in Japan (Gutierrez), who are in dispute over who should take care of a child.

Maalaala Mo Kaya is Star Cinema's sixth feature-length film, and was released on June 22, 1994, as part of the program's third anniversary and as an entry to the 1994 Manila Film Festival. Melendez won the festival award for Best Actress, but controversy arose when Ruffa Gutierrez was deceptively announced at first to have won the award, with Manila Mayor Alfredo Lim alleging that cheating took place at the award ceremony. Caridad Sanchez won the FAMAS Award for Best Supporting Actress.

== Plot ==
The film begins with Ana, who is in hysterics when her cousin, 16-year-old Marissa, is about to give birth. She gave birth to a baby boy named BJ. In order to provide for her son, Marissa decided to go to Japan to work. BJ would consider Ana as his mother, despite being a working student, with the help of her mother, Nena. Ana, who was working in McDonald's, met Mike, who came from a wealthy family. But his father, Miguel, is very cold to him for unknown reasons. Upon meeting BJ, Mike became very close to him. Ana would also fall in love with Mike.

However, Marissa, who is now married to a Japanese man, arrived. Ana would clash with Marissa for BJ's rights. But Marissa was shocked when she saw Mike. Mike and Marissa had a relationship, but he left Marissa when the latter became pregnant, revealing that he's BJ's biological father, the reason why he's very close to the boy. Ana decided to let go of BJ, but BJ became very uncomfortable with Marissa, especially with Tonichi. Tonichi would become very cruel to BJ, making it a reason to go back to Ana. Marissa knows that although she's BJ's biological mother, she has no place in BJ's heart and Ana is his recognized mother. Marissa said to Ana that she was suffered and abused in Japan until she was saved by Tonichi. Marissa brought BJ back to Ana and left.

== Cast ==
- Charo Santos-Concio as herself
- Richard Gomez as Mike
- Aiko Melendez as Ana
- Chin-Chin Gutierrez as Marissa
- Karl Angelo Legaspi as BJ
- Caridad Sanchez as Nena
- Robert Arevalo as Miguel
- Liza Lorena as Minerva
- Eula Valdez as Gigi
- Jeannette Fernando as McDonald's Manager
- Shintaro Valdez as Jimmy
- Jao Mapa as Jerry
- Vangie Labalan as Aling Tessie
- Glenda Garcia as Stella
- Joe Jardy as Mang Ador
- Kite Lopez as Simang
- Dwight Gaston as Danny
- Mhalouh Crisologo as woman in church
- Butch Namba as Tonichi
- Pocholo Montes as lawyer
- Richard Reynante as McDonald's crew

== Production ==
Olivia Lamasan, a screenwriter and line producer who had no prior intention of becoming a director, was convinced by her colleague Malou N. Santos and mentor Charo Santos-Concio to do directorial work for the television series Maalaala Mo Kaya (for which Santos-Concio was the host) in the early 1990s. With the establishment of Star Cinema in 1993, Lamasan was assigned to direct Maalaala Mo Kaya: The Movie as her first theatrical film. She was initially nervous about directing Richard Gomez, by then a popular actor with experience in directing commercials, but eventually warmed up to the task as production went on.

Maalaala Mo Kaya: The Movie is the film screenwriting debut of Mel Mendoza-del Rosario, a television writer for Maalaala Mo Kaya.

=== Post-production ===
In the 1990s, dialogue for Filipino films was often dubbed during post-production instead of recorded on set, with a dubbing supervisor heading the procedure. For Maalaala Mo Kaya, Lamasan decided to personally direct the actors in the recording of their dialogue. Actress Aiko Melendez nearly quit the dubbing session due to Lamasan's insistence that she replicate the performance she gave on set for a dramatic scene, but was scolded by the director into coming back to the session, upon which she finished the dubbing with an in-sync performance after one take.

== Release ==
Maalaala Mo Kaya: The Movie was released in Philippine theaters on June 22, 1994. The film, whose Japanese title is My Child (Japanese: 私の子供, Hepburn: Watashi no Kodomo), was later screened in Japan on March 5, 1997, as part of the showing of Filipino films sponsored by The Japan Foundation in Tokyo.

=== Box office ===
By July 6, 1994, the film had grossed ₱46 million at the box office, earning ₱30 million in Metro Manila and ₱16 million in the provinces.

=== Restoration ===
In 2015, the film was restored by the ABS-CBN Film Archives, with the restored version receiving a premiere in March at the Cine Adarna within the University of the Philippines Diliman.

== Reception ==
=== Accolades ===
Group	Category	Name	Result
Manila Film Festival	Best Actress	Aiko Melendez	Won
Catholic Mass Media Awards	Film of the Year	Maalaala Mo Kaya: The Movie	Won
FAMAS Awards	Best Picture	Maalaala Mo Kaya: The Movie	Nominated
FAMAS Awards	Best Director	Olivia M. Lamasan	Nominated
FAMAS Awards	Best Actor	Richard Gomez	Nominated
FAMAS Awards	Best Actress	Aiko Melendez	Nominated
FAMAS Awards	Best Supporting Actor	Robert Arevalo	Nominated
FAMAS Awards	Best Supporting Actress	Caridad Sanchez	Won
