= Of All the Things (film) =

- Official movie poster
- Directed by: Bb. Joyce Bernal
- Written by: Mel Mendoza-del Rosario
- Produced by: Vicente G. Del Rosario III; Veronique Del Rosario-Corpus; Jose Mari Abacan
- Starring: Aga Muhlach; Regine Velasquez
- Cinematography: Charlie Peralta
- Edited by: Joyce Bernal; Marya Ignacio
- Music by: Vincent de Jesus
- Production companies: VIVA Films; GMA Pictures
- Distributed by: Viva Films
- Release date: September 26, 2012
- Running time: 105 minutes
- Country: Philippines
- Language: Filipino
- Box office: US$542,932.00

Of All the Things is a 2012 Philippine romantic comedy film directed by Joyce Bernal from a screenplay by Mel Mendoza-del Rosario and starring Aga Muhlach and Regine Velasquez. Produced by GMA Pictures and VIVA Films, it was released on September 26, 2012. The film is Regine and Aga's third team-up after Dahil May Isang Ikaw (1999) and Pangako... Ikaw Lang (2001), both produced by Viva Films.

== Plot ==
Muhlach plays the role of Umboy, a notary public attorney who earns a living by notarizing important documents and other papers. Velasquez plays the role of Berns, a professional documents fixer. Every time Berns needs a notary public, she goes to Umboy to "legalize" her documents. Umboy is not a fan of Berns fixing documents. Their different ideology and principles in life are the causes of friction between the characters. However, with friction came attraction.

== Cast ==
=== Main Cast ===
- Aga Muhlach as Atty. Emilio "Umboy" Arellano
- Regine Velasquez-Alcasid as Bernadette "Berns" Pamintuan

=== Supporting Cast ===
- Gina Pareño as Mommy Susie Pamintuan, Berns's mother
- John Lapus as Rocky
- Mark Bautista as Eps
- Tommy Abuel as Umboy's father
- Ariel Ureta as Berns' father
- Raymond Lauchengco as Dan, Umboy's older brother
- Nikki Bacolod as Princess Pamintuan
- Pinky Marquez as Umboy's mother
- Jojo Alejar as Chief of staff of senator
- Joy Viado as Mrs. Manubat
- Jay Perillo as suitor of Princess
- Rachelle Ann Go as concert guest
- Miriam Quiambao as Umboy's ex-girlfriend
- Jerry O'Hara as lawyer of Mrs. Manubat
- Jimmy Marquez as a host
- Kean Cipriano as himself

The bands Callalily, Mayonnaise and Pop Girls make an appearance in the film, along with 2010 Bar exam bombing survivor Raissa Laurel, Senator Chiz Escudero, police officer Elmer Jamias, model Imee Hart, actor Boy Alano and filmmaker Romy Suzara.

== Production ==
=== Background and development ===
The film was first announced in 2009 by VIVA Films. The lead actor, Aga Muhlach signed a three-movie contract and one of them was the film that reunites him with Asia's songbird Regine Velasquez after eight years. The two previously paired up in Dahil May Isang Ikaw in 1999 and Pangako Ikaw Lang in 2001. Critically acclaimed director, Joyce E. Bernal directed the film, the one who also directed their last two movies. The film had a target play date for summer 2011, but it did not push through. The producers announced that the play date was moved to March 2012, but again it did not push through. On August 27, 2012, during the press conference that was held at the Citybest Restaurant in Quezon City, the play date of September 26, 2012, was finally announced. The film premiered after 3 years of delay.

=== Filming ===
Under Joyce Bernal, Irene "Ayrin" Villamor served as assistant director.

Filming began in 2009, but was halted due to scheduling conflicts with Velasquez. In 2010, after a year of hiatus, the film began filming again, but was stopped because of Velasquez preparations for her wedding with singer-songwriter Ogie Alcasid. In 2011, because of Velasquez' pregnancy, the shooting of the film had no chance to continue because of the doctor's advice for Velasquez to rest. In July 2012, months after Velasquez' giving birth, the movie resumed shooting. The filming was finished in August 2012, and Muhlach confirmed on an interview in Bombo Radyo that the showing of the movie will finally push through.

== Release ==
=== International release ===
The lead stars, Regine Velasquez and Aga Muhlach, in their appearance in "Pinoy Henyo" segment of Eat Bulaga!, stated that the film is going to have screenings in Guam, hinting further screenings internationally, although no confirmations were made by the management of GMA Network nor its distribution partner Freestyle Releasing for screenings internationally or Viva Films.

=== Box office ===
As of October 14, 2012, the film earned (₱20.4 million).
