= Miguelito: Batang Rebelde =

1985 coming-of-age political action drama film by Lino Brocka

- Directed by: Lino Brocka
- Written by: Jose Y. Dalisay Jr.
- Produced by: Alex Muhlach; Alvaro "Cheng" Muhlach
- Starring: Aga Muhlach; Nida Blanca; Eddie Garcia; Gloria Romero
- Cinematography: Pedro Manding Jr.
- Edited by: Armando Jarlego
- Music by: Homer Flores
- Production company: D'Wonder Films
- Distributed by: Solar Entertainment
- Release date: 14 June 1985
- Running time: 116 minutes
- Country: Philippines
- Language: Filipino

Miguelito: Batang Rebelde (transl. Miguelito: Young Rebel) is a 1985 Philippine coming-of-age political action drama film directed by Lino Brocka from a story and screenplay written by Jose Y. Dalisay. Starring Aga Muhlach in the title role, the film follows a teenage boy as he seeks justice against his father, the town's mayor, played by Eddie Garcia, with the help of his estranged biological mother. It also stars Nida Blanca, Gloria Romero, Mario Montenegro, Paquito Diaz, Rey "PJ" Abellana, Liza Lorena, Gretchen Barretto, and Beth Bautista.

Produced by D'Wonder Films, the film was theatrically released in the Philippines on 14 June 1985.

== Plot ==
Miguelito, nicknamed Mike, is the son of Ven and Christina. However, Christina is Mike's adoptive mother because his biological mother, Auring, is imprisoned on fabricated charges. After she was released from jail, she decided to return to her hometown in Laguna to demand justice from the felons. However, this planned act became challenging for her when she discovered that her former lover, Ven Herrera, had become the town mayor. As the town's chief executive, he and his accomplices began oppressing the townsfolk, particularly those who wanted to speak the truth on Auring's behalf.

While Auring received support from her friend and a trusted lawyer, Mike discovered the truth about himself and his father's tyranny. Afterward, the two sides began clashing with each other until Ven met his violent demise. Now, the rule of tyranny and corruption drew to a close, as Mike and Auring were reunited.

== Cast ==
- Aga Muhlach as Miguelito "Mike" Herrera: The titular main character
- Nida Blanca as Auring Posadas: Miguelito's biological mother
- Eddie Garcia as Venancio "Ven" M. Herrera: The mayor of the fictional town of Rojas, Laguna, and Miguelito's father
- Gloria Romero as Christina Monfort: Ven's wife and Miguelito's adoptive mother
- Mario Montenegro as Judge Vic Gaerlan: The town's judge
- Ronaldo Valdez as Dr. Felix Tantuico
- Robert Arevalo as Elmer Nunez: Auring's trusted lawyer
- Paquito Diaz as Chief
- Beth Bautista as Janet
- Delia Razon
- Liza Lorena
- Rey "PJ" Abellana as Roy
- Leni Santos
- Gretchen Barretto
- Lito Pimentel as Chino

== Reception ==
=== Critical response ===
Film critic Butch Francisco described Miguelito as an exemplary, relatable drama that serves as a powerful sociopolitical allegory. He pointed out that the screenplay accurately reflects the realistic corruption and human rights abuses committed by the government. While the work being marketed around Aga Muhlach's title role, Nida Blanca's role of a falsely jailed mother was commended, with significant support from Gloria Romero's "adoptive mother" role.

=== Accolades ===
Award-giving organization	Date of ceremony	Category	Recipient(s)	Result	Ref.
34th FAMAS Awards	18 May 1986	Best Picture	Miguelito: Batang Rebelde	Nominated	
34th FAMAS Awards	18 May 1986	Best Director	Lino Brocka	Nominated	
34th FAMAS Awards	18 May 1986	Best Actor	Eddie Garcia	Nominated	
34th FAMAS Awards	18 May 1986	Best Actress	Nida Blanca	Nominated	
34th FAMAS Awards	18 May 1986	Best Supporting Actor	Aga Muhlach	Nominated	
34th FAMAS Awards	18 May 1986	Best Story	Miguelito: Batang Rebelde; Written by Jose Y. Dalisay Jr.	Won	
10th Gawad Urian Awards	4 June 1986	Best Picture	Miguelito: Batang Rebelde	Nominated	
10th Gawad Urian Awards	4 June 1986	Best Director	Lino Brocka	Nominated	
10th Gawad Urian Awards	4 June 1986	Best Actor	Aga Muhlach	Nominated	
10th Gawad Urian Awards	4 June 1986	Best Actor	Eddie Garcia	Nominated	
10th Gawad Urian Awards	4 June 1986	Best Actress	Nida Blanca	Won	
10th Gawad Urian Awards	4 June 1986	Best Supporting Actress	Liza Lorena	Nominated	
10th Gawad Urian Awards	4 June 1986	Best Screenplay	Miguelito: Batang Rebelde; Written by Jose Y. Dalisay Jr.	Nominated	
10th Gawad Urian Awards	4 June 1986	Best Editing	Armando Jarlego	Nominated	
4th FAP Awards	1986	Best Actress	Nida Blanca	Won	
4th FAP Awards	1986	Best Supporting Actress	Liza Lorena	Won	
