= Let's Ask Pilipinas =

Philippine television show

- Title card
- Genre: Game show
- Based on: Let's Ask America by Jeff Apploff
- Directed by: Conci Flores
- Presented by: Aga Muhlach (Season 1 and 2); Ogie Alcasid (Season 3)
- Country of origin: Philippines
- Original language: Tagalog
- No. of episodes: 200

Production
- Executive producer: Rose Camia
- Production locations: TV5 Studio B, Novaliches, Quezon City
- Running time: 30 minutes
- Production companies: Associated Broadcasting Company; E. W. Scripps Company; Telepictures; Warner Bros. International Television Production

Original release
- Network: TV5
- Release: October 14, 2013 – November 21, 2014

Related
- Let's Ask America

Let's Ask Pilipinas was a Philippine television game show created by Telepictures, based on the American television game show Let's Ask America. It was aired from October 14, 2013, to November 21, 2014, on TV5. It was hosted by Aga Muhlach on its first and second season. The show was part of the Everyday All the Way weekday primetime block. The show returned on July 7, 2014, on its third season as part of TV5's noontime block and was hosted by Ogie Alcasid.

== Main Game ==
=== Round 1 ===
In Round 1, there are four contestants, and each of them will attempt to answer the three multiple-choice questions. In this round, questions will have two possible answers. The host will first read the two answers and then follow with the question to be answered. Then, all four contestants will have approximately 30 seconds to write down their answers on to the card stock included in their game kits. Once all contestants have verbally acknowledged that they have written down their answers, the host will ask them each to reveal their answers in a sequence determined by producers. Then the host will reveal the correct answer. Each contestant that answered the question correctly will be awarded the prize money assigned for that question. Contestants who answered incorrectly will receive no prize money. After the correct answer to the first question has been revealed, all four contestants will receive the next question. The host will reveal the correct answer to the next questions, and any money earned will be assigned to the proper contestants. The contestant with the least amount of money at the end of the round (or the loser of the tiebreaker challenge, if applicable) will be eliminated and will not receive any prize money earned before elimination. The three contestants with the most money at the end of the round will advance to Round 2.

Question	Value
1st Question	₱2,000
2nd Question	₱3,000
3rd Question	₱4,000

=== Round 2 ===
Round 2 is the same, with three possible answers. Again, the player with the least money is eliminated empty-handed.

Question	Value
1st Question	₱6,000
2nd Question	₱8,000
3rd Question	₱10,000

Round 3 is the same, but now there are four possible answers to choose from. The higher-scoring player wins the game.

==== Round 3 Scoring ====
Question	Value
1st Question	₱12,000
2nd Question	₱15,000

=== Tie-breaker (AGAD-AGAD) ===
If there's a tie at the end of each round (for second, third or fourth in the first two rounds; for first in the last) the tied players will play a special game. The tied players will do a scavenger hunt race for the correct answer to a survey question. When the host says "GO", they start the race. The last-place player will be eliminated and the highest scoring player(s) advances.

== Bonus Round ==
Before the break the player will write his/her wager, then will face another 4-option question. He/she has to answer it in 30 seconds. Giving the correct answer will add the money equal to his/her wager, but an incorrect answer loses the wager. However, if a player wagers all of their money and answers correctly, his/her wager pays 5:1; if he/she is wrong while wagering everything, they win nothing. The maximum top prize is ₱300,000.
