= M3: Malay Mo Ma-develop =

- Genre: Comedy; Drama
- Directed by: Jeffrey R. Jeturian
- Starring: Aga Muhlach; Ai-Ai delas Alas
- Country of origin: Philippines
- Original language: Filipino
- No. of episodes: 22

Production
- Running time: 60 minutes
- Production company: Star Creatives

Original release
- Network: ABS-CBN
- Release: July 3 – November 27, 2010

M3: Malay Mo Ma-develop is a Philippine television sketch comedy show broadcast by ABS-CBN. Directed by Jeffrey R. Jeturian, it stars Aga Muhlach and Ai-Ai delas Alas. It aired on the network's Yes Weekend! line up from July 3 to November 27, 2010, replacing Pinoy Big Brother: Teen Clash 2010 and was replaced by Laugh Out Loud.

== Synopsis ==
JM Benicio III is every woman's ideal man - good-looking, hardworking and successful in his structured corporate life. Yet he remains unmarried at 38. Behind JM's seemingly contented façade is actually a complicated character - perfectionist, cold, cautious and elusive of commitment. JM is bound to meet the jologs Kringkring, a single mother who'd practically grab any job in order to feed and give her son, Marcus, a better life. The odd friendship will usher Kringkring into JM's mysterious past including his unfinished business with the woman he truly loves. JM's soft spot surfaces when he starts playing a reluctant daddy to Kringkring's son. The impossible and indifferent JM will eventually break free from his past hurts and will finally realize the value of love and commitment.

== Cast ==
=== Main cast ===
- Ai-Ai delas Alas as Kristina Marie "Kring Kring" Dimasupil - Kringkring grew up not knowing who her father is. She was able to study but only up to 2nd year high school. She's a 'Miss Congeniality', smart ass, strong willed who knows how to get her way. She has a devil-may care attitude but has a caring heart. She will do anything for her son, Marcus.
- Aga Muhlach as Jose Maria "JM" Benicio III - JM is an only son to the rich couple and he's his Grandfather's favorite. He grew up to be well-mannered and with proper breeding. He's perceptive to details. He dreams of becoming a good architect like his father. A family-oriented guy but this all changed when at a young age he witnessed his parents always in heated arguments for reasons he did not understand.

=== Supporting cast ===
- Megan Young as Bea Cornejo
- Tom Rodriguez as Ted Salazar
- Niña Jose as Meg
- Jojo Alejar as Mon
- Nico Antonio as Rain
- Mika dela Cruz as Ara
- Jairus Aquino as Marcus
- Noel Trinidad as Lolo Jong
- Tess Antonio as Karen

== See also ==
- List of programs broadcast by ABS-CBN
