= Aga Muhlach =

Filipino actor (born 1969)

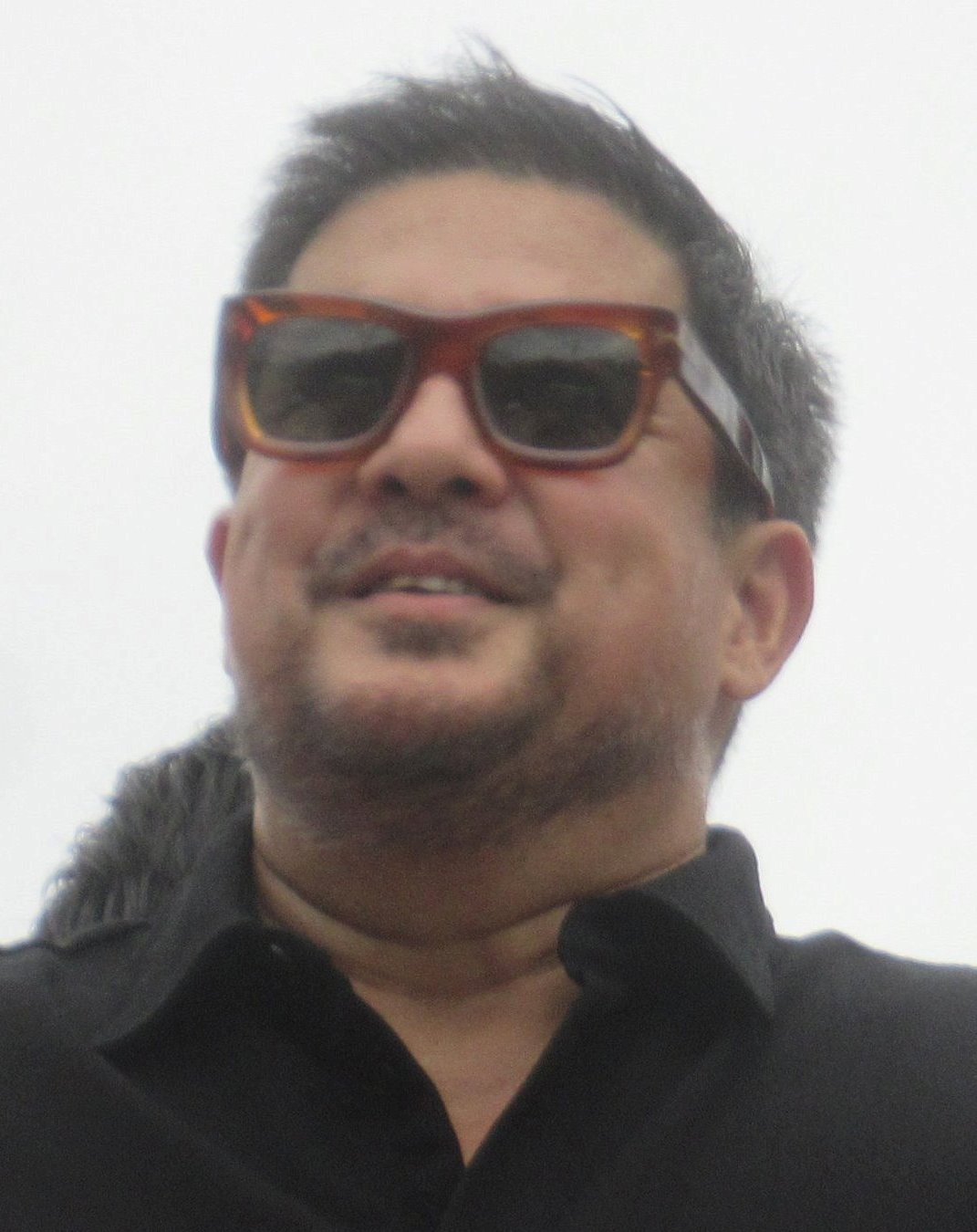
- Muhlach in 2024
- Born: Ariel Aquino Muhlach; August 12, 1969 (age 57); Santa Cruz, Manila, Philippines
- Other name: Ariel Muhlach
- Education: San Beda College (dropped out)
- Occupations: Actor; model
- Years active: 1975–present
- Agent: Viva Artists Agency
- Height: 1.70 m (5 ft 7 in)
- Political party: Independent (2015–present)
- Other political affiliations: Liberal (2012–2015)
- Spouse: Charlene Gonzales (m. 2001)
- Children: 3, including Atasha and Andres
- Relatives: AJ Muhlach (half-brother); Niño Muhlach (cousin); Alonzo Muhlach (nephew); Amalia Fuentes (aunt); Liezl Martinez (cousin)
- Awards: Full list

Ariel "Aga" Aquino Muhlach (Tagalog pronunciation: [ˈmulak]; born August 12, 1969) is a Filipino actor. Regarded as the "King of Romance-Drama" and the "Philippines' Original Heartthrob", he has received numerous local and international accolades throughout his career, including Star Awards, Maria Clara Awards, and a FAMAS Award.

He debuted in entertainment using his real name Ariel Muhlach at age 7 when he appeared in the films May Isang Tsuper ng Taksi (1975) and Babaing Hiwalay Sa Asawa (1976), but he only became well known (under his new screen name "Aga Muhlach") with the success of the coming-of-age film Bagets (1984), after which he became a matinée idol. His other popular film roles include Bakit Labis Kitang Mahal (1992), Sa Aking mga Kamay (1996), Nag-iisang Bituin and Basta't Kasama Kita (1995) and Bayarang Puso (1996) before becoming a romantic male lead in the late 1990s and 2000s as well as in In the Name of Love (2011) and First Love (2018). In politics, Muhlach unsuccessfully ran for a congressional seat in Camarines Sur in 2013.

== Biography ==
=== Early life ===
Aga Muhlach was born on August 12, 1969, at Galang Maternity Clinic in Santa Cruz, Manila to Álvaro Amador Muhlach (January 16, 1947 - May 12, 2018) and Anita Adis Aquino (May 26, 1949 - November 18, 2007). He is one of 8 children: sisters Arlene, Almira and Andrea and brothers AJ, Andrew, Aaron and Albert. He finished high school at Aquinas School in San Juan City, and entered San Beda College to study commerce. He dropped out of school to focus on acting.

Muhlach is from a prominent show business family. His father is the younger brother of former actress Amalia Fuentes; his cousin Niño Muhlach was the leading child actor of the 1970s; his brother AJ Muhlach was a member of the boy band XLR8 and his two sisters, Almira and Arlene, are also actresses.

His family has Spanish (Asturian), German and Chinese roots. His paternal grandfather, Álvaro Muhlach Agüera, was born in Barcelona, Spain, to Alejandro Muhlach Agüera and Enriqueta Agüera Iglesias, who were from Santander and Comillas, respectively both in Cantabria, but their ancestry originated from Asturias; Alejandro's father is a descendant of German settlers in Spain. His paternal grandmother Concepción Borja Amador was born in Xiamen, China, to a Chinese father and a Bicolano mother from Goa, Camarines Sur.

=== Acting career ===
==== 1970s–80s: Teenage years ====
He began his career as a child actor in the 1975 film, May Isang Tsuper ng Taksi and 1976 film, Babaing Hiwalay Sa Asawa; his aunt Amalia Fuentes was the lead in the latter film. At this time, he was still using his real name in the credits. He also appeared in the 1980 film Aguila which starred Fernando Poe Jr. and Christopher de Leon.

At age 14, Muhlach was cast as one of the male leads in Viva Entertainment's 1984 film, Bagets. The film, which is about typical teenage life in the 80s, also starred William Martinez, Herbert Bautista, JC Bonnin and Raymond Lauchengco. As the majority of the target audience could relate to the story, the film was a success, and Muhlach became a popular matinee idol.

As a result of his popularity, he was cast in the title role in Miguelito: Batang Rebelde, in which he portrayed a rebellious teenager in conflict with his mother. He was nominated for "Best Supporting Actor" in the FAMAS Awards, and "Best Actor" in the Gawad Urian Awards.

He was paired with Janice de Belen in the 1986 film, Super-Wan-Tu-Tri, alongside Tito Sotto, Vic Sotto and Joey de Leon. The next year, he received his first acting award at the 1987 Gawad Urian Awards for Best Supporting Actor for his performance in the 1986 film, Napakasakit, Kuya Eddie.

==== 1990s: Mature roles ====
Amid an emerging generation of younger actors, Muhlach took on the challenge of more mature roles, increasing his stock as one of the Philippines' top matinee idols. Hiring publicist Ethel Ramos as his manager, he developed into one of the top dramatic actors of the 1990s.

He was the male lead in the light-hearted chick flick films Bakit Labis Kitang Mahal (1992) and Sana Maulit Muli (1995) with leading lady Lea Salonga, Bakit Pa Kita Minahal (1994) with Kris Aquino and Ruffa Gutierrez, Basta't Kasama Kita (1995) with Dayanara Torres, May Minamahal (1993) and Ikaw Pa Rin Ang Iibigin (1998) with Aiko Melendez, and Dahil May Isang Ikaw (1999) with Regine Velasquez, as well as starring in more serious dramas: Nag-Iisang Bituin (1994) with Vilma Santos, Sinungaling Mong Puso (1992) with Gabby Concepcion, Bayarang Puso (1996) with Lorna Tolentino, and Sa Aking Mga Kamay (1996) with Christopher de Leon among others.

He also branched out into TV sitcoms including his first as a lead in ABS-CBN's Oki Doki Doc from 1993 to 2000. The series had a film spin-off entitled Oki Doki Doc: The Movie produced by Star Cinema in 1996.

==== 2000s–present: "Leading man" of his generation ====
In the 2000s, Muhlach appeared in television series such as Da Body En Da Guard (2001), Da Pilya En Da Pilot (2001), OK Fine Whatever (2003), and the continuation of Oki Doki Doc, That's My Doc (2007).

In 2001, he appeared in another movie with Regine Velasquez, "Pangako Ikaw Lang."

In 2009, he ventured into music when he participated in the all-star recording for the benefit of Typhoon Ketsana, locally known as Ondoy, titled Kaya Natin Ito! along with other OPM artists.

After 18 years at ABS-CBN, Muhlach transferred to TV5 in 2011 to focus more on hosting. His last project with ABS-CBN was M3: Malay Mo Ma-develop in 2010, and In the Name of Love with Star Cinema.

In 2013, discussions arose over Muhlach teaming up with his former leading actress, Lea Salonga for the third time.

In 2024, Muhlach and his family announced that they will star as the Persival family in the sitcom Da Pers Family, directed by Danni Caparas and produced by TV5, Cignal TV, Studio Viva, and Sari-Sari Network.

== Politics ==
In 2013, Muhlach ran for a seat in the House of Representatives to represent Camarines Sur's 4th district under the then-ruling Liberal Party. However, he lost to Felix William Fuentebella, son of outgoing representative Arnulfo Fuentebella and a member of a political dynasty, by almost 3,000 votes. He filed an electoral protest before the House of Representatives Electoral Tribunal on June 4, 2013, alleging that there was massive vote buying, ballot tampering or errors on vote-counting machines in seven municipalities under the district. However, it was later dismissed as he and Fuentebella mutually agreed to drop the case.

== Reception ==
When I do a project, I give it my all...I don't want to pressure myself with the idea of awards. Neither do I want to be complacent because I won one recently. After winning, I try to forget about it and treat each project like it's my first. — Aga Muhlach

Muhlach is an actor in the Philippine entertainment industry. He is known for being one of the Philippine cinema's leading men of romantic dramas, being partnered with leading ladies such as Lea Salonga, Sharon Cuneta, Claudine Barretto, Maricel Soriano, Angel Locsin, Regine Velasquez, Kris Aquino, Aiko Melendez, Anne Curtis and recently Bea Alonzo and Bela Padilla. He has been described as a multi-media product endorser, a role model to Filipinos of all ages, a supporter of underprivileged children, a matinee idol, and multi-award-winning actor.

== Personal life ==
Early in his acting career, he was often rejected for roles. For example, Lily Monteverde, a Regal Films producer turned him down many times after talent manager Douglas Quijano introduced Muhlach and the film Bagets to her. Muhlach also had financial problems and was often without money. In the early 1990s, he received upbeat projects In 1992. Lily Monteverde produced Sinungaling Mong Puso with Vilma Santos, which gained Aga Muhlach his Best Supporting Actor. He also gained notoriety for his on and off again relationship with Janice De Belen as they starred in Pakasalan Mo Ako with co-stars John Estrada and Gabby Concepcion.

From 1990 to 1999, he was the highest paid actor in the Philippines, paired with Aiko Melendez in May Minamahal, (1994, 1997) Kris Aquino (1993, 1994), Ruffa Gutierrez, G. Toengi (1999), Mikee Cojuangco-Jaworski (1994, 1998) Regine Velasquez, (1999, 2001, 2012) Lorna Tolentino, (1996) Carmina Villaroel, (1994, 1996) Maricel Laxa, (1994) Dawn Zulueta, (1993) beauty queen Dayanara Torres (1995) Lea Salonga, (1992, 1995) Alice Dixson and Snooky Serna (1991).

In the 2000s he worked with controversial sex goddess Joyce Jimenez in 2001 on the sitcom TV Da Body en Da Guard and even in the rom-com film "Narinig Mo Na Ba Ang Latest?" In 2001, he starred in the box office hit Pangako Ikaw Lang with Velasquez. In 2002, he starred with future box office actresses Claudine Barretto in Kailangan Kita in 2002, and Dubai 2005, Sharon Cuneta in Kung Ako Na Lang Sana (2003), Kristine Hermosa in All My Life 2004, Maricel Soriano and Angelica Panganiban in A Love Story (2007) and 2008 with Anne Curtis in When Love Begins. In the 2010s he starred in In The Name of Love with Angel Locsin, "First Love" (2018) with Bea Alonzo as well as Miracle in Cell No. 7 in 2019 with Bela Padilla.

=== Relationships ===
In 1986, Muhlach, 17, had a child with Janice de Belen after the two were paired in the film Super-Wan-Tu-Tri. De Belen announced her pregnancy on primetime television and said Muhlach had asked her to marry him, but that she refused as they were still young. Muhlach's father was also against the marriage because of their ages. De Belen gave birth to Luigi "Igi Boy" Muhlach, Muhlach's first child.

Muhlach has been linked to actresses Agot Isidro, Melissa Fernandez, Gretchen Barretto and Mikee Cojuangco.

In 1993, he was dating Aiko Melendez during the shooting of their movie May Minamahal but after their relationship ended, he was linked romantically with Puerto Rican former Miss Universe and 1995 film Basta't Kasama Kita leading actress Dayanara Torres. The couple dated for three to four years.

=== Family ===
Muhlach married Charlene Gonzalez, a Miss Universe 1994 Top 6 finalist, in May 2001. They started dating only after he asked for her parents' permission to get engaged to her. They met through Gonzalez' cousin and his former co-star J.C. Bonnin when the latter was 16. They met again during the 1994 Binibining Pilipinas pageant, in which he was a judge, and she won as Binibing Pilipinas–Universe. She was also his co-star in Oki Doki Doc, where they became friends. They got married on May 28, 2001, in St. Joseph the Worker Parish in Pacdal, Baguio, less than a year after their engagement. Later that year, Gonzalez gave birth to twins named Atasha and Andres, both of whom later joined the entertainment industry; in July 2024, the Muhlach family starred in the TV5 sitcom Da Pers Family.

== Filmography ==
=== Film ===
Year	Title	Role
1975	May Isang Tsuper ng Taksi	
1976	Babaing Hiwalay sa Asawa	
1980	Aguila	Danielito Aguila
1984	Erpat Kong Forgets	
1984	Bagets	Adie
1984	Ibulong Mo sa Puso	
1984	Paano Ba ang Magmahal?	
1984	Campus Beat	RED
1984	Hotshots	
1985	Miguelito: Batang Rebelde	Miguelito/Mike
1985	The Crazy Professor	
1985	Oks Na Oks Pakner	
1985	Super Wan-Tu-Tri	Abel
1986	When I Fall in Love	
1986	Napakasakit, Kuya Eddie	Dino
1986	Nasaan Ka Nang Kailangan Kita	Joel
1986	Bakit Madalas ang Tibok ng Puso?	Ricky
1987	Bunsong Kerubin	Efren
1987	Topo-Topo Barega	Efren
1988	Rosa Mistica	Mike
1988	Lord, Bakit Ako Pa?	
1989	My Pretty Baby	Bobby
1989	Hot Summer	
1989	Here Comes the Bride	
1989	Impaktita	Jessie
1989	Irosin: Pagputok ng Araw, Babaha ng Dugo	
1990	Too Young	Montilla
1991	Pakasalan Mo Ako	Jerry
1991	Joey Boy Munti, 15 Anyos Ka sa Muntinlupa	Joey Boy
1991	I Want to Live	
1992	Ang Katawan ni Sofia	Arnold
1992	Bakit Labis Kitang Mahal	Tommy
1992	Sinungaling Mong Puso	Jason
1993	Ms. Dolora X	
1993	Humanda Ka Mayor!: Bahala Na ang Diyos	
1993	Hindi Kita Malilimutan	Nestor
1993	Guwapings Dos	Chappy
1993	Akin Ka, Magdusa Man Ako	
1993	Abel Morado: Ikaw ang May Sala	Abel Morado
1993	Paniwalaan Mo	
1993	May Minamahal	Carlitos
1994	Bakit Pa Kita Minahal	Jet
1994	Forever	Chito
1994	Nag-Iisang Bituin	Miggy
1995	Basta't Kasama Kita	Alex
1995	Sana Maulit Muli	Jerry Morales
1996	Oki Doki Dok: The Movie	Doc Aga
1996	Kristo	Possessed young man
1996	Bayarang Puso	Martin Villanueva
1996	Ikaw ang Mahal Ko	Himself
1996	Sa Aking Mga Kamay	Gene Rivera
1998	Ikaw Pa Rin ang Iibigin	Sonny Lerma
1998	Dahil Ba sa Kanya	Jed Espinosa
1999	Hinahanap-Hanap Kita	Bryan
1999	Dahil May Isang Ikaw	Andrew Castro
2001	Narinig Mo Na Ba ang L8est	Popoy
2001	Pangako... Ikaw Lang	Vince
2002	Kailangan Kita	Carl Diesta
2003	Kung Ako na Lang Sana	Vince/Enteng
2004	All My Life	Sam
2005	Dubai	Raffy Alvarez
2007	A Love Story	Ian Montes
2008	When Love Begins	Ben Caballero
2010	RPG: Metanoia	Daddy (Voice)
2011	In the Name of Love	Emman Toledo
2012	Of All the Things	Umboy
2017	Seven Sundays	Allan Bonifacio
2018	First Love	Nick Gutierrez
2019	Nuuk	Mark
2019	Miracle in Cell No. 7	Joselito "Lito" Gopez
2023	Martyr or Murderer	older Bongbong Marcos
2024	Ikaw Pa Rin ang Pipiliin Ko	Michael
2024	Uninvited	Guilly Vega
2026	2nd Miracle in Cell No. 7	Joselito "Lito" Gopez

=== Television ===
Year	Title	Role
1985–1996	Lovingly Yours, Helen	
1986–1995	Vilma On Seven	
1987	Hapi House!	Rocky
1993–2000	Oki Doki Doc	Dr. Agaton "Doc Aga" Villaluz
1993–2001	Star Drama Presents	
1995–2010; 2016–present	ASAP	
1998	Magandang Tanghali Bayan	Himself (Guest performer)
2001	Da Body en da Guard	
2001	Da Pilya en da Pilot	
2002–2004	OK Fine Whatever	Michael
2004–2006	OK Fine, 'To ang Gusto Nyo!	Michael
2005	Wowowee	
2006	OK Fine, Oh Yes	
2007–2008	That's My Doc	Dr. Agaton "Doc Aga" Abogado
2008	Matanglawin	Himself (Guest)
2009	It's Showtime	Himself (Guest)
2010	M3 (Malay Mo Ma-develop)	Jose Maria "JM" Benicio III
2011–2013	Pinoy Explorer	Himself (Host)
2013–2014	Let's Ask Pilipinas	Himself (Host)
2016	Magandang Buhay	Himself (Guest)
2016	Pinoy Boyband Superstar	Himself (Judge)
2017	Tonight with Boy Abunda	Himself (Guest)
2019	Gandang Gabi Vice	Himself (Guest)
2020	Wowowin	Himself (Guest co-host)
2020	Masked Singer Pilipinas	Himself (Judge)
2022	Suntok sa Buwan	Jaime "Jimmy Boy" Laurente
2022–2023	Tara Game, Agad Agad! Level Up	Himself (Host)
2024–2025	Da Pers Family	Aga Persival

== Endorsements ==
He is one of the male celebrities who are in-demand for advertising contracts. One of his advertisements is with Jollibee, in which he is a longtime commercial endorser of the fast food chain. In addition, he is the founder of MaAga Ang Pasko, an annual Christmas gift giving event of Jollibee starting in 1994, wherein people can donate things such as toys and clothes.

The following is an incomplete list of his former and present commercials and product endorsements:

- Selecta Ice Cream
- Boost
- Pond's Age Miracle
- Poten-Cee
- Lactacyd feminine wash
- Solmux cough medicine
- Jollibee
- BayanTel
- Touch Mobile
- Sun Cellular
- Toyota
- ACA Video
- Quaker Oats
- Promac Appliances
- Bobson Apparel
- Argentina Corned Beef
- Zesto Cola
- Century Tuna
- Rusty Lopez Clothing
- Pantene shampoo
- Daikin Aircon
- AGFA Film

== Awards and nominations ==
Awards and nominations received by Aga Muhlach
Organization	Year	Nominated Work	Category	Result	Ref.
Box Office Entertainment Awards	2008	A Love Story	Film Actor of the Year	Won	
FAMAS Award	1986	Miguelito: Batang Rebelde	Best Supporting Actor	Nominated	
FAMAS Award	1993	Sinungaling mong Puso	Best Actor	Won	
FAMAS Award	1994	May Minamahal	Best Actor	Nominated	
FAMAS Award	1996	Sana Maulit Muli	Best Actor	Nominated	
FAMAS Award	1997	Bayarang Puso	Best Actor	Nominated	
FAMAS Award	2000	Dahil May Isang Ikaw	Best Actor	Nominated	
FAMAS Award	2004	Kung Ako na lang Sana	Best Actor	Nominated	
FAMAS Award	2005	All My Life	Best Actor	Nominated	
FAMAS Award	2006	Dubai	Best Actor	Nominated	
FAMAS Award	2008	A Love Story	Best Actor	Nominated	
FAMAS Award	2009	When Love Begins..	Best Actor	Nominated	
FAMAS Award	2012	In the Name of Love	Best Actor	Nominated	
FAMAS Award	2018	Seven Sundays	Best Supporting Actor	Nominated	
FAP Awards	1996	Sana Maulit Muli	Best Actor	Nominated	
FAP Awards	2008	A Love Story	Best Actor	Nominated	
FAP Awards	2009	When Love Begins...	Best Actor	Nominated	
FAP Awards	2013	Of All the Things	Best Actor	Nominated	
FAP Awards	2018	Seven Sundays	Best Actor	Won	
Gawad Urian Award	1986	Miguelito: Batang Rebelde	Best Actor	Nominated	
Gawad Urian Award	1987	Napakasakit Kuya Eddie	Best Supporting Actor	Won	
Gawad Urian Award	1992	Akin Ka Magdusa Man Ako	Best Actor	Nominated	
Gawad Urian Award	1993	Bakit Labis Kitang Mahal	Best Actor	Nominated	
Gawad Urian Award	1994	May Minamahal	Best Actor	Nominated	
Gawad Urian Award	1996	Sana Maulit Muli	Best Actor	Won	
Gawad Urian Award	2003	Kailagan Kita	Best Actor	Nominated	
Gawad Urian Award	2004	Kung Ako na lang Sana	Best Actor	Nominated	
Golden Screen Awards	2004	Kung Ako na lang Sana	Best Performance by an Actor in a leading role	Won	
Golden Screen Awards	2006	Dubai	Best Performance by an Actor in a leading role	Nominated	
Golden Screen Awards	2012	In the Name of Love	Best Performance by an Actor in a leading role	Won	
Golden Screen Awards	2013	Of All the Things	Best Performance by an Actor in a leading role	Won	
Maria Clara Awards	2006	Dubai	Best Actor	Won	
Metro Manila Film Festival	1992	Bakit Labis Kitang Mahal	Best Actor	Won	
Metro Manila Film Festival	1993	May Minamahal	Best Actor	Won	
Metro Manila Film Festival	2019	Miracle in Cell No. 7	Best Actor	Nominated	
PMPC Star Awards for Movies	2006	Dubai	Movie Actor of the Year	Won	
PMPC Star Awards for Movies	2008	A Love Story	Move Actor of the Year	Nominated	
PMPC Star Awards for Movies	2009	When Love Begins...	Movie Actor of the Year	Nominated	
PMPC Star Awards for Movies	2012	In the Name of Love	Movie Actor of the Year (tied with Jorge Estregan for Manila Kingpin: The Asiong Salonga Story)	Won	
PMPC Star Awards for Movies	2013	Of All the Things	Movie Actor of the Year	Nominated	
PMPC Star Awards for Television	2014	Pinoy Explorer	Best Travel Program Host	Won	
Young Critics Circle	1992	Joey Boy Munti, 15 anyos ka sa Muntilupa	Best Performance by Male or Female, Adult or Child, Individual or Ensemble in Leading or Supporting Role	Won	
Young Critics Circle	1994	Hindi Kita Malilimutan	Best Performance by Male or Female, Adult or Child, Individual or Ensemble in Leading or Supporting Role	Won	
Young Critics Circle	1996	Sana Maulit Muli	Best Performance by Male or Female, Adult or Child, Individual or Ensemble in Leading or Supporting Role	Nominated	
