= Olivia Lamasan =

Filipino film director

- Born: Olivia M. Lamasan; October 17, 1963 (age 62); Philippines
- Other names: Inang, Olive
- Occupations: Consultant, ABS-CBN Film Productions, Inc. director, writer, producer, creative consultant
- Known for: Sana Maulit Muli; Barcelona: A Love Untold; Starting Over Again; The Mistress

Olivia M. Lamasan is a Filipino television and film director, writer, producer, and creative consultant, known for her works such as Sana Maulit Muli and Madrasta which were both successful.

Lamasan, the former head of ABS-CBN's creative department, also served as the managing director of ABS-CBN Film Productions, Inc. (formerly StarCinema) until 2022. She currently serves as a consultant for the network's film/television outfit as well as a resident television and film director of the network.

== Career ==
Lamasan began her career in 1986 as a Production Assistant in Nine Deaths of the Ninja. Her directorial debut came in 1994 with Maalaala Mo Kaya: The Movie. Over the next two years, Lamasan directed an additional two films, Sana Maulit Muli and Madrasta. The latter film received several nominations, and Lamasan won the PMPC Star Awards for Director of the Year.

Lamasan continued to direct feature films such as Got 2 Believe (2002) and Milan (2004) while also serving as the creative director for Pangako Sa ’Yo. In 2009, Lamasan directed In My Life starring the Philippines' "Star for All Seasons" Vilma Santos, Luis Manzano and John Lloyd Cruz. The film was successful having a gross revenue of PHP137.4 Million. Several of Lamasan's films went on to earn well at the box office, such as In the Name of Love, The Mistress, and Starting Over Again. In 2013, Lamasan was one of the judges in the biggest songwriting competition in the Philippines, Himig Handog.

In 2023 Lamasan announced that she would direct Elena 1944, based on a screenplay by Patrick Valencia and Enrico C. Santos. Kathryn Bernardo was brought on to portray the titular Elena. Production on the film was delayed due to Bernardo's involvement in Hello, Love, Again. The film marks the first time Bernardo and Lamasan have worked together since the 2016 film Barcelona: A Love Untold.

== Personal life ==
Lamasan has been twice diagnosed with breast cancer, in 2008 and 2002. In both cases Lamasan opted for a mastectomy. She has been vocal about her diagnoses and has worked with the I Can Serve Foundation.

== Filmography ==
=== Television ===
Year	Title	Credit	Network
2000–2002	Pangako Sa ’Yo	Creative director	ABS-CBN
2013–2014	Got to Believe	Creative director	ABS-CBN
2014–2015	Forevermore	Creative Consultant	ABS-CBN
2015–2016	Pangako Sa ’Yo	Director	ABS-CBN
2016	Dolce Amore	Creative Director	ABS-CBN

=== Film ===
Year	Title	Credit	Associated Production Company
1990	Nagsimula sa Puso	Line producer	Vision Films
1990	Bala at Rosaryo	Writer	Vision Films
1990	Kapag Langit ang Humatol	Line producer	Vision Films
1991	Ipagpatawad Mo	Writer	Viva Films
1992	Lumayo Ka Man sa Akin	Writer	Seiko Films
1992	Mahal Kita, Walang Iba	Writer	Regal Films
1994	Maalaala Mo Kaya: The Movie	Director	ABS-CBN Film Productions, Inc.
1995	Sana Maulit Muli	Director	ABS-CBN Film Productions, Inc.
1996	Madrasta	Director	ABS-CBN Film Productions, Inc.
1997	Hanggang Kailan Kita Mamahalin?	Director	ABS-CBN Film Productions, Inc.
2000	Minsan, Minahal Kita	Director	ABS-CBN Film Productions, Inc.
2002	Got 2 Believe	Director	ABS-CBN Film Productions, Inc.
2004	Milan	Director	ABS-CBN Film Productions, Inc.
2009	In My Life	Director	ABS-CBN Film Productions, Inc.
2011	In the Name of Love	Director	ABS-CBN Film Productions, Inc.
2012	The Mistress	Director	ABS-CBN Film Productions, Inc.
2014	Starting Over Again	Director	ABS-CBN Film Productions, Inc.
2016	Barcelona: A Love Untold	Director	ABS-CBN Film Productions, Inc.
2019	Hello, Love, Goodbye	producer	ABS-CBN Film Productions, Inc.
2024	Hello, Love, Again	writer	ABS-CBN Studios, Star Cinema, GMA Pictures

=== Music Videos ===
Year	Title	Credit
2026	Unang Kilig (with Bini)	Herself

== Awards ==
Year	Award-Giving Body	Category	Work	Result
2010	GMMSF Box-Office Entertainment Awards	Scriptwriters of the Year (with Raymond Lee, Senedy Que)	In My Life	Won
2013	GMMSF Box-Office Entertainment Awards	Most Popular Screenwriter (with Vanessa Valdez)	The Mistress	Won

== See also ==
- Star Cinema
