= Jolina Magdangal discography =

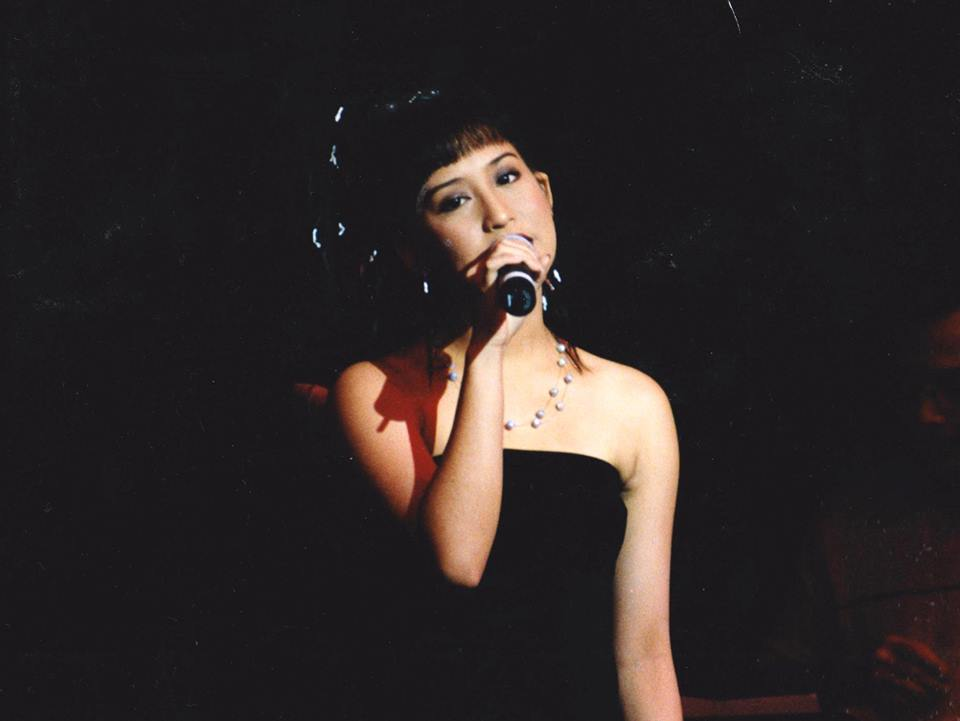
- Magdangal in California
- Studio albums: 8
- Soundtrack albums: 9
- Compilation albums: 2
- Remix album: 1

Filipino singer-actress and television host Jolina Magdangal has released eight studio albums, nine soundtrack albums, two compilation albums, one remix album and a number of singles and promotional recordings.

Magdangal began her career as a member of the world-renowned composer Ryan Cayabyab's singing group 14K. In 1996, she was chosen by Walt Disney Records as its first Filipino recording artist to sing the theme songs of Pocahontas and The Hunchback of Notre Dame for local promotion. On the same year, Magdangal released her debut studio album A Wish Comes True under Walt Disney Records and distributed by Universal Records (Philippines). Still in 1996, she was featured in several Star Records (now Star Music) soundtrack albums releasing movie promotional recordings such as Minsan Sa Ating Buhay (1996) for Magic Temple and Hintayin Mo Lang (1996) for Ang TV Movie: The Adarna Adventure. Even before releasing studio albums that went multi-platinum, Magdangal has been the voice behind the theme songs of various movies and television programs. With an array of theme song hits synonymously associated to her, Magdangal is known in the Philippines as the undisputed movie theme song and soundtrack queen.

In 1997, Magdangal released her sophomore studio album Jolina, her first under Star Records. The album contains original cuts along with previously recorded songs from her movie soundtracks. By the end of the year 1997, the album was certified Quadruple Platinum (4× Platinum) by the Philippine Association of the Record Industry (PARI) and was declared as the biggest selling album of the year 1997. Eventually, the album received a 7× Platinum certification for selling more than 280,000 units. Her follow up album, On Memory Lane (2000), was even a bigger surprise. When local artists were doing an all-revival album by exploring the music mines of the '80s and the '70s, Magdangal joined the revival bandwagon through On Memory Lane by traipsing across the '50s and the '60s in her own take. Not only the album contains songs coming from periods considered as the golden age of popular music, the booklet in its packaging also delivered a take on the nostalgia craze when Magdangal was costumed as a World War II beauty and photographed in other period costumes. Following the commercial success of the album Jolina, On Memory Lane was certified Gold Record by PARI after three days of its release, and eventually achieved a 6× Platinum certification for selling more than 240,000 units. More to that, the album was praised by critics and hailed as one of the finest albums ever released in the Philippine music industry.

Her self-titled album, Jolina, and all-revival album, On Memory Lane, are listed among the best selling albums of all time in the Philippines. In 2002, Magdangal had a smooth metamorphosis from a youth kiddie pop star to a grown-up artist through her album Jolina Sings the Masters. Not only the album featured a more matured and subdued Jolina - no more bangs and too much frills - but also Magdangal interpreted the compositions with mature emotions. Said album is considered as a first in local recording industry for putting up together master composers in the country in a single album.

Through her music, Magdangal has travelled not only the Islands of the Philippines but also the East and West Coasts of the United States, Hawaii, Guam, Saipan, Canada, Australia, Europe, The Middle East and Asia. In 2002, Magdangal transferred to GMA Network. After a year, she was chosen to be the banner artist of the then newly built GMA Records through the company's initial album offering, Forever Jolina. Her next two albums were released under GMA Records in 2006 and 2008. In 2003, Magdangal was selected to represent the Philippines in the Japan-ASEAN Pop Festival held at Yokohama, Japan. The concept and aim of J-ASEAN POPs is to find synergy among the diverse cultures of Japan and the ASEAN countries and to bring about a sense of togetherness and community among a wide range of people who support it, through exchanges in popular music. Magdangal took a seven-year hiatus in the recording industry since releasing her last GMA Records album Destiny in 2008. In 2014, she came back to ABS-CBN, and after a year, she released her come back album Back To Love via digital download. The physical album was released on February 15, 2016, and after two weeks in the market, her come back album was certified Gold Record by PARI.

As of 2016, Star Music executive and producer Rouqe Rox Santos claims that Magdangal still holds the title Star Music Queen of Pop and the Original Queen of Star Music due to the number of albums that turned gold and quadruple platinum. To date, Magdangal has sold over a million copies of her albums in the Philippines, becoming one of the best-selling artists in the country.

== Studio albums ==
Album title	Album details	Sales	Certifications
Album title	Album details	(sales thresholds)	
A Wish Comes True	Released: 1996; Label: Walt Disney Records, Distributed by Universal Records; Formats: CS, CD	No data available	—
Jolina	Released: January 9, 1999; Label: Star Records; Formats: CS, CD	PHL: 280,000+	PARI: 7× Platinum
On Memory Lane	Released: January 23, 2000; Label: Star Records; Formats: CS, CD	PHL: 240,000+	PARI: 6× Platinum
Jolina Sings the Masters	Released: August 15, 2002; Label: Star Records; Formats: CS, CD	PHL: 30,000+	PARI: Gold
Forever Jolina	Released: January 2004; Label: GMA Records; Formats: CS, CD	PHL: 40,000+	PARI: Platinum
Tuloy Pa Rin Ang Awit: A Repackaged Special Edition was released in July 2006	Released: February, 2006; Label: GMA Records; Format: CD	No data available	—
Destiny	Released: July, 2008; Label: GMA Records; Format: CD	No data available	—
Back to Love	Released (Digital): November 20, 2015; Released (Physical album): February 15, 2016; Label: Star Music; Formats: CD, digital download	PHL: 7,500+	PARI: Gold

Note: Figures on units sales are based on Philippine Association of the Record Industry's existing thresholds during the year the albums were released. Adjustments for inflation are not reflected in this article.

== Soundtrack albums ==
Album title	Album details	Sales	Certifications
Album title	Album details	(sales thresholds)	
Ang TV Movie: The Adarna Adventures	Released: 1996; Label: Star Records; Formats: CS, CD	No data available	—
FLAMES: The Movie	Released: 1997; Label: Star Records; Formats: CS, CD	PHL: 80,000+	Record label (Star Records): 2× Platinum
Kung Ayaw Mo, Huwag Mo! (soundtrack)	Released: 1998; Label: Star Records; Formats: CS, CD	No data available	—
Labs Kita... Okey Ka Lang? (soundtrack)	Released: 1998; Label: Star Records; Formats: CS, CD	PHL: 80,000+	PARI: 2× Platinum
Puso Ng Pasko	Released: 1998; Label: Star Records; Formats: CS, CD	No data available	—
GIMIK: The Reunion	Released: 1999; Label: Star Records; Formats: CS, CD	PHL: 20,000+	PARI: Gold
Hey Babe! (1999 film soundtrack)	Released: 1999; Label: Star Records; Formats: CS, CD	PHL: 20,000+	PARI: Gold
Annie B. (soundtrack)	Released: 2004; Label: Viva Records; Formats: CD	No data available	—
Lovestruck OST	Released: 2005; Label: GMA Records; Formats: CD	No data available	—

Note: Figures on units sales are based on Philippine Association of the Record Industry's existing thresholds during the year the albums were released. Adjustments for inflation are not reflected in this article.

== Remix album ==
Album title	Album details	Sales	Certifications
Album title	Album details	(sales thresholds)	
Red Alert: All Hits Dance Remix	Released: January 19, 2001; Label: Star Records; Formats: CS, CD	PHL: 20,000+	PARI: Gold

Note: Figures on units sales are based on Philippine Association of the Record Industry's existing thresholds during the year the albums were released. Adjustments for inflation are not reflected in this article.

== Karaoke album ==
Album title	Album details	Sales	Certifications
Album title	Album details	(sales thresholds)	
On Memory Lane Karaoke	Released: 2000; Label: Star Records; Format: VCD	No data available	—

== Compilation albums ==
Album title	Album details	Sales	Certifications
Album title	Album details	(sales thresholds)	
Panaginip: Platinum Hits Collection	Released: 2001; Label: Star Records; Formats: CS, CD	PHL: 20,000+	PARI: Gold
The Jolina Magdangal Anthology	Released: 2004; Label: Star Records; Format: CD; Distributed exclusively in the United States by PinoyVision Records	No data available	—

Note: Figures on units sales are based on Philippine Association of the Record Industry's existing thresholds during the year the albums were released. Adjustments for inflation are not reflected in this article.

== Singles, soundtracks, and promotional recordings ==
Year	Song	Details		
Year	Song	Film / Outfit	TV program / Network	Album / Label
1994	ATV (Ang TV) Theme (With Ang TV cast)	—	Ang TV / ABS-CBN	Ang TV: The Album / Ivory Records Credited as Jolina / Jolina appears courtesy of Disney Records.
1994	Magkaibigang Tunay	—	Ang TV / ABS-CBN	Ang TV: The Album / Ivory Records Credited as Jolina / Jolina appears courtesy of Disney Records.
1995	Colors of the Wind (Local promo version)	Pocahontas / Walt Disney Pictures	—	Non-album recording / Walt Disney Records and Universal Records
1995	Kaya Mo Yan (Credited as Jolina; With Ang TV Teens)	—	Ang TV / ABS-CBN	Ang TV Na! Homecoming / Star Records (Now Star Music) / Jolina appears courtesy of Disney Records
1995	Baby Love	Baby Love / Regal Films	—	Non-album recording
1996	Someday (Local promo version)	The Hunchback of Notre Dame / Walt Disney Pictures	—	Non-album recording / Walt Disney Records and Universal Records
1996	Mara Clara (Finale theme)	Mara Clara: The Movie / Star Cinema	—	Non-album recording
1996	Hintayin Mo Lang	Ang TV Movie: The Adarna Adventures / Star Cinema	—	Ang TV Movie: The Adarna Adventures Soundtrack / Star Records / Jolina appears courtesy of Disney Records
1996	Sana	Album single		A Wish Comes True / Walt Disney Records and Universal Records (Philippines)
1997	Tameme	FLAMES: The Movie / Star Cinema	—	FLAMES: The Movie Soundtrack / Star Records
1997	Sana'y Kapiling Ka	FLAMES: The Movie / Star Cinema	—	FLAMES: The Movie Soundtrack / Star Records
1998	May Nasisilungan Ako (Duet with Maricel Soriano)	Kung Ayaw Mo, Huwag Mo / Star Cinema	—	Kung Ayaw Mo, Huwag Mo Soundtrack / Star Records
1998	Feeling Heaven Ka Na Ba?	Kung Ayaw Mo, Huwag Mo / Star Cinema	—	Kung Ayaw Mo, Huwag Mo Soundtrack / Star Records
1998	T.L. Ako Sayo (Duet with Marvin Agustin)	Kung Ayaw Mo, Huwag Mo / Star Cinema	—	Kung Ayaw Mo, Huwag Mo Soundtrack / Star Records
1998	Tulak Ng Bibig, Kabig Ng Dibdib	Kung Ayaw Mo, Huwag Mo / Star Cinema	—	Kung Ayaw Mo, Huwag Mo Soundtrack / Star Records
1998	Alas Singko Y Media Na Theme	—	Alas Singko Y Media / ABS-CBN	Non-album recording
1998	Kapag Ako'y Nagmahal	Labs Kita... Okey Ka Lang? / Star Cinema	—	Labs Kita... Okey Ka Lang? Soundtrack / Star Records
1998	Tingnan Mo Naman Ako	Labs Kita... Okey Ka Lang? / Star Cinema	—	Labs Kita... Okey Ka Lang? Soundtrack / Star Records
1998	Kanino Ba?	Labs Kita... Okey Ka Lang? / Star Cinema	—	Labs Kita... Okey Ka Lang? Soundtrack / Star Records
1998	Richard Loves Lucy Theme	—	Richard Loves Lucy / ABS-CBN	Non-album recording
1998	Puso Ng Pasko	Puso Ng Pasko / Star Cinema	—	Puso Ng Pasko Soundtrack / Star Records
1999	Laging Tapat	Album single		Jolina / Star Records
1999	Paper Roses	Album single		Jolina / Star Records
1999	Mahal Mo Ba Ako?	GIMIK: The Reunion / Star Cinema	—	GIMIK: The Reunion Soundtrack / Star Records
1999	Chuva Choo Choo (Duet with Nikki Valdez)	Hey Babe! / Star Cinema	—	Hey Babe! Soundtrack / Star Records
1999	May Hinahanap Ang Puso	Hey Babe! / Star Cinema	—	Hey Babe! Soundtrack / Star Records
2000	Crying Time	Album single		On Memory Lane / Star Records
2000	Too Young	Album single		On Memory Lane / Star Records
2000	Mahal Ka Sa Akin	Tunay na Tunay: Gets Mo? Gets Ko! / Star Cinema	—	Non-album recording
2000	Arriba, Arriba! Theme	—	Arriba, Arriba! / ABS-CBN	Non-album recording
2001	For Life! (Jingle) (With Jimmy Bondoc)	WRR 101.9 (Radio station jingle)		WRR 101.9 Music For Life
2001	Laging Tapat (Deep House Mix)	Album single		Red Alert: All Hits Dance Remix / Star Records
2001	Panaginip	Kung Ikaw Ay Isang Panaginip / Star Cinema	—	Panaginip: Platinum Hits Collection / Star Records
2002	Kahit Di Mo Pansin	Album single		Jolina Sings the Masters / Star Records
2002	Million Miles Away	Album single		Jolina Sings the Masters / Star Records
2002	Kahit Ika'y Panaginip Lang	—	Kahit Kailan / GMA Network	Jolina Sings the Masters / Star Records
2002	Kahit Kailan	—	Kahit Kailan / GMA Network	Non-album single but was later included in Forever Jolina album (2004)
2002	GMA Foundation Jingle(s)	Jingles for GMA Foundation (now GMA Kapuso Foundation projects		Non-album recording
2002	Nasaan Ka Man (Duet with Dolphy)	Home Alone Da Riber / RVQ Productions	—	Non-album recording
2003	Narito Ang Puso Ko	—	Narito Ang Puso Ko / GMA Network	Non-album single but was later included in Forever Jolina album (2004)
2003	Treasure The World (Filipino version: Awit Ng Ligaya)	J-ASEAN Pops Official Image Song: *The promo CD contains the image song translated into different languages, including Awit Ng Ligaya sung by Magdangal		Treasure The World (ASEAN JAPAN Exchange Year 2003) / Produced by Japan Foundation
2004	Bahala Na	Album single		Forever Jolina / GMA Records
2004	Is It Okay If I Call You Mine	Annie B. / Viva Films	—	Annie B. Soundtrack / Viva Records (Philippines)
2004	Pasko Ng Kapuso	—	Christmas Station ID Theme / GMA Network	Kapuso Sa Pasko / GMA Records
2005	Together Forever	Lovestruck	—	Lovestruck Soundtrack / GMA Records
2005	Maybe (With 604)	Lovestruck	—	Lovestruck Soundtrack / GMA Records
2006	Maybe It's You	—	Initially released as a carrier single for Tuloy Pa Rin Ang Awit album but later used as theme song for My Name Is Kim Sam Soon / GMA Network	Tuloy Pa Rin Ang Awit / GMA Records
2006	Makulay Na Buhay	—	I Luv NY / GMA Network	Non-album single but was later included in the repackaged Tuloy Pa Rin Ang Awit album
2006	Tuloy Pa Rin Ang Awit	Album single		Tuloy Pa Rin Ang Awit / GMA Records
2006	Let Me Be The One (With guest artist Janno Gibbs)	Album single		Tuloy Pa Rin Ang Awit / GMA Records
2006	Gusto	Album single		Tuloy Pa Rin Ang Awit / GMA Records
2006	Walang Imposible	—	Wish Ko Lang! / GMA Network	Initially a non-album recording but was later included in a GMA Records compilation album
2007	Alinlangan	—	Super Twins / GMA Network	Initially a non-album recording but was later included in a GMA Records compilation album
2007	Hanggang Sa Dulo	Batanes: Sa Dulo Ng Walang Hanggan / Ignite Media, Inc.	—	Batanes: Sa Dulo Ng Walang Hanggan Soundtrack / Ignite Media, Inc.
2008	Will of the Wind	Initially released as a carrier single for the Destiny album but was later used as theme song in I.T.A.L.Y.	—	Destiny / GMA Records
2008	Hanggang Kailan	Album single		Destiny / GMA Records
2008	Buksan Ang 'Yong Puso	—	The Legend / GMA Network	Destiny / GMA Records
2008	Masagana (Theme)	Product: Land Bank of the Philippines / Project: Masagana		Non-album promo recording
2009	Hinahanap-hanap Kita	—	Adik Sa'Yo / GMA Network	Non-album single
2015	Kapag Ako Ay Nagmahal	—	FlordeLiza / ABS-CBN	Initially a non-album recording but was later included in the expanded version of the album Back To Love (2016) album
2015	Chuva Choo Choo v.2 (With Vice Ganda)	Beauty and the Bestie / Star Cinema	—	Initially a non-album recording but was later included in the expanded version of the album Back To Love (2016) album
2016	Ikaw Ba Yon (Initially released in November, 2015 via Digital download)	Album single		Back To Love / Star Music
2016	Magandang Buhay Theme (With co-hosts)	—	Magandang Buhay / ABS-CBN	Non-album recording
2017	Sa Panaginip Lang	Promotional		Back To Love / Star Music
2018	Kaya Mo Pa Ba	Album single		Back To Love / Star Music
2022	Kumilos at Manalangin (Ipanalo Natin 'To)	—	—	Musiko Para Kay Leni Robredo
2023	Stella Maris	—	—	Soundtrack of our Faith

== Other appearances ==
Year	Song	Details		
Year	Song	Album artist	Album title	Label
1991	Various songs in the album (Background vocals only)	Gary Valenciano	Shout4Joy	WEA Records
1992	Various songs in the album (Background vocals only)	Geneva Cruz	I Like You	Universal Records
1993	Give Love On Christmas Day (with Universal Motion Dancers)	Universal Motion Dancers	Merry Christmas From The UMD	Universal Records
1996	Minsan Sa Ating Buhay	Various Artists	Magic Temple Soundtrack	Star Records
1998	Ngayong Pasko	Various Artists	Sa Araw Ng Pasko	Star Records
1998	Sa Araw Ng Pasko (All-Star Cast)	Various Artists	Sa Araw Ng Pasko	Star Records
1999	Bawat Bata (With Carol Banawa and Roselle Nava)	Various Artists	Children of the Universe	Star Records
1999	Munting Pangarap Sa Pasko	Various Artists	Di Ba't Pasko'y Pag-ibig?	Star Records
1999	Di Ba't Pasko'y Pag-ibig?	Various Artists	Di Ba't Pasko'y Pag-ibig?	Star Records
2000	Hand In Hand	Various Artists	World Youth Day Emmanuel	Star Records
2000	Emmanuel (All-Star Cast)	Various Artists	World Youth Day Emmanuel	Star Records
2000	Super Pinoy (With Quarter To Five)	Various Artists	Himig Handog Sa Bayaning Pilipino	Star Records
2000	Top Of The World (with Carlos Agassi)	Carlos Agassi	The Amir of Rap	Star Records
2001	Ikaw Ang Buhay Ko (with L.A. Lopez)	L.A. Lopez	Yakap	Star Records
2001	Sana Ngayong Pasko	Various Artists	Ngayong Pasko	Star Records
2002	Maalaala Mo Kaya	Various Artists	Kundiman	Star Records
2002	Ako Pa	Various Artists	Pagbabago	Pagbabago Pilipinas
2003	Biyahe Tayo! Performed with Artists for Philippine Tourism (21 Top Filipino Singers)	Various Artists	Biyahe Tayo Promo CD	Produced by the Department of Tourism and Pfizer (Note: No online data. See Hicap, J. / Manila Bulletin (December 2003)/ 21 artists sing for free to promote Philippine tourism)
2003	Tulay	Various Artists	Metropop Song Festival 2003	BMG Records Pilipoinas
2003	Pilipino sa Turismo'y Aktibo			Produced by the Philippine Tourism Authority
2004	Waray-waray	Various Artists	Lagi Kitang Mamahalin: A Musical Tribute to the National Artists	Viva Records
2004	Merry Christmas, Darling	Various Artists	Kapuso Sa Pasko	GMA Records
2004	Kapuso Sa Pasko	Various Artists	Kapuso Sa Pasko	GMA Records
2014	It's Book Time With Rivermaya	Various Artists	Joomajam, Vol. 1	Ritmo Learning Lab
2014	Oras Na Para Magbasa With Rivermaya	Various Artists	Joomajam, Vol. 1	Ritmo Learning Lab
2016	Tama Lang	Various Artists	Himig Handog P-Pop Love Songs	Star Music
2022	Laban Leni	Various artist	Non album release	Jonathan Manalo Music
