= Jolina Magdangal filmography =

Television and film projects

This article provides details of Jolina Magdangal's television and film projects.

== Film ==
Key
†	Denotes films that have not yet been released

Year	Title	Role	Notes	Ref(s)
1995	Hataw Na	Agnes Pineda		
1996	Radio Romance	Willie Acosta		
1996	Ama, Ina, Anak	Owie Nolasco		
1996	Ang TV Movie: The Adarna Adventures^{1}	Prinsesa Adarna / Ibong Adarna		
1997	Flames: The Movie^{1}	Leslie Ledesma	Feature Title: Tameme	
1997	Adarna: The Mythical Bird	Princess Carmona	Voice only	
1998	Kung Ayaw Mo, Huwag Mo!	Ditas Cabantog		
1998	Labs Kita... Okey Ka Lang?^{1}	Bujoy Santillian		
1998	Puso ng Pasko	Merry		
1999	Gimik: The Reunion^{1}	Ese Aragon		
1999	Hey Babe!^{1}	Abigail		
2000	Tunay na Tunay: Gets Mo? Gets Ko!^{1}	Meilin Lee / Tin-Tin		
2002	Kung Ikaw Ay Isang Panaginip^{1}	Rosalie		
2002	Home Alone Da Riber	Joey	Title sometimes confused as Home Along Da Riber	
2004	Annie B.	Anne		
2005	Lovestruck	Jandra		
2007	Ouija	Romina		
2008	I.T.A.L.Y. (I Trust and Love You)	Destiny		
2011	Agawan Base	Richelle	Independent film	
2019	Familia Blondina	Angel Jolina		
2021	Momshies: Ang Soul Mo'y Akin!	Jolene		
2025	Ex Ex Lovers	Joy	Also as Executive Producer	

^{1} Digitally restored, remastered, and re-released by the ABS-CBN Film Restoration Project.

== Television ==
†	Denotes programs/episodes that have not yet been aired
†	Magdangal's active program

=== As a regular cast ===
Year	Title	Role	Notes	Ref(s)
1992-1996	Ang TV	Herself	Co-host and performer	
1993	Abangan Ang Susunod Na Kabanata	Jolina	Secondary lead role	
1995	ASAP	Herself	Co-host and performer	
1995	'Sang Linggo nAPO Sila	Herself	Co-host and performer	
1996	Gimik	Socorro Corazon "Ese" Aragon	Main role; Co-lead role	
1997–1998	Esperanza	Karen Alonzo-Montejo	Secondary lead role	
1997–1998	Star Drama Theater Presents: Jolina	Various Roles in 8 episodes	Lead role	
1997-1999	Onli In Da Pilipinas	Baby Girl	Secondary lead role	
1997-1999	Richard Loves Lucy	Jules	Secondary lead role	
1999	Labs Ko Si Babe	Cinderella "Cindy" Angeles	Main role; Lead role	
2000	Arriba, Arriba!	Winona Arriba	Main role; Lead role	
2002	The Working President	Herself	Main host	
2002	SOP	Herself	Co-host and performer	
2002	Kahit Kailan	Frankie	Main role; Lead role	
2003	Narito ang Puso Ko	Antonina San Victores / Isabella Campuspos	Main role; Lead role	
2004	StarStruck Kids	Herself	Main host	
2004	StarStruck (season 2)	Herself	Main co-host	
2005	StarStruck: The Nationwide Invasion	Herself	Main co-host	
2005	Unang Hirit	Herself	Secondary co-host	
2006	StarStruck: The Next Level	Herself	Main co-host	
2006	I Luv NY	Apolinaria "Polly" Balumbalunan	Main role; Lead role	
2006	Bongga Ka Star!	Herself	Main host	(Note: No available online data. See Thats Entertainment column of Master Showman Kuya Germs, February 6, 2006, Ang Pilipino Star Ngayon) (Note: See also A Little Bit by Remy Umerez, April 2006, How Jolina Chats Up Celebs)
2007	Masigasig	Herself	Main host	
2008	Pinoy Idol	Herself	Judge	
2008	Dear Friend	Herself	Main co-host	
2009	Adik Sa'Yo	Joanna Maglipot (Lindenberg)	Main role; Lead role	
2010	Panday Kids	Ola	Secondary lead role	
2010	Party Pilipinas	Herself	Co-host and performer	
2010	Grazilda	Fairy godmother	Secondary lead role	
2011	Iglot	Ramona Sebastian / Ramona Salvador-Marco	Main role; Co-lead role	
2011	Personalan: Ang Unang Hakbang	Herself	Main co-host	
2012	My Daddy Dearest	Rose Soriano-Adonis/Camilla	Main role; Co-lead role	
2012	Protégé: The Battle For The Big Artista Break	Herself	Mentor	
2012	Del Monte Kitchenomics	Herself	Main co-host	
2013	Mundo Mo'y Akin	Zenaida "Aida" Carbonel	Main role; Co-lead	
2013	Sunday All Stars	Herself	Co-host and performer	
2015	FlordeLiza	Florida "Ida" Malubay-Magsakay	Main role; Lead role	
2016	ASAP †	Herself	Main host and performer	
2016-2026	Magandang Buhay	Herself	Main co-host	
2023	Pera O Bayong at Pie Channel	Herself	Main host	
2023	Sino'ng Manok Mo? at Pie Channel	Herself	Main host	
2024–2025	Lavender Fields	Lily Atienza	Main role	
2025	Idol Kids Philippines	Herself	Main host	
2026	Mommy Guard †	Tina Dimaapi	Main role	

=== Recurring / Multiple appearances ===
Year	Title	Role	Notes	Ref(s)
2003–2004	Click	Sydney's cousin	Recurring character	
Various years	24 Oras	Herself	Interim anchor of Chika Minute for Pia Guanio	
2009–2010	Showbiz Central	Herself	Recurring guest co-host	
2010	Diz Iz It!	Herself	Celebrity judge; 6 episodes	
2013–2014	Mars	Herself	Recurring guest co-host	
2015	Your Face Sounds Familiar	Herself/Impersonator	Season 1: 12 weeks in competition	
2015	The Singing Bee	Herself	Season 7: 9 final episodes	
2016	Kris TV	Herself	Recurring guest co-host	
2017	Tawag ng Tanghalan Kids	Herself	Recurring judge	
2017	Tawag ng Tanghalan (season 2)	Herself	Recurring judge	
2019	Tawag ng Tanghalan (season 3)	Herself	Recurring judge	
2019	Tawag ng Tanghalan: All-Star Grand Resbak	Herself	Recurring judge	
2019	ASAP Natin 'To †	Herself	Recurring Performer	
2020	Tawag ng Tanghalan season 4	Herself	Recurring judge	
2021	Tawag ng Tanghalan season 5	Herself	Recurring judge	
2022	Tawag ng Tanghalan (season 6)	Herself	Recurring judge	
2023	Tawag ng Tanghalan Duets	Herself	Recurring judge	
2023	Tawag ng Tanghalan: Ikapitong Taon	Herself	Recurring judge	
2023	The Voice Kids	Herself	Season 5; 2 Episodes; Guest co-host	
2024	Tawag ng Tanghalan: The School Showdown	Herself	Recurring Judge	
Various years	It's Showtime †	Herself	Recurring Performer	
Various years	Eat Bulaga! †	Herself	Recurring Performer	

=== As a featured artist ===
Year	Program Title	Role	Notes	Ref(s)
1996	Maalaala Mo Kaya	Ella	Episode: "Karayom"	
1997	Star Drama Presents... Jolina	Various roles	Various episodes	
1997	Wansapanataym	Angeli	Episode: "Daga"	
1997	Maalaala Mo Kaya	?	Episode: "Mangga"	
1997	Maalaala Mo Kaya	Abby	Episode: "Bintana"	
1998	Maalaala Mo Kaya	Blessie	Episode: "Gitara"	
2000	Maalaala Mo Kaya	Deng	Episode: "Apron"	
2000	Star Studio Presents...	Herself	Episode: "Very Very Jolina"	
2002	Wansapanataym	Red Ninja	Episode: "Ming-Ja"	
2002	A Joli(na) Christmas	Herself	Christmas special	
2003	Magpakailanman	Wayda Cosme	Episode: "Abot-Kamay na Pangarap"	
2003	Magpakailanman	Love Anover	Episode: "The Love Anover Story"	
2004	Magpakailanman	Herself	Episode: "Sa Bawat Pagsubok ng Isang Idolo"	
2005	Love to Love	Jasmine	Season 5, Feature series: "Love Blossoms"	
2005	Magpakailanman	Tenten Munoz	Episode: "The Tenten Munoz Life Story"	
2005	Extra Challenge	Herself	Feature challenge: "Bahay-bahayan challenge"	
2006	Magpakailanman	Jasmine Trias	Episode: "The Jasmine Trias Life Story"	
2006	Hooo U	Aby	5 episodes; Halloween special	
2008	Dear Friend	Jane	2-part episode: "Mike & Jane"; Pre-Christmas special	
2011	"I Do", Times Two	Herself	Wedding special	
2016	Wansapanataym	Susan	Feature series: "Susi Ni Sisay"	
2017	I Can See Your Voice	Herself	Season 1: Episode No. 6	
2019	Maalaala Mo Kaya	Peachie Dioquino-Valera	Episode: "Third eye"	

== Music videos ==
Year	Title	Album
1997	"Tameme"	F.L.A.M.E.S.: The Movie Soundtrack
1998	"T.L. Ako Sa'yo"^{1}	Kung Ayaw Mo, Huwag Mo! Soundtrack
1998	"Kapag Ako Ay Nagmahal"	Labs Kita... Okey Ka Lang Soundtrack
1998	"Sa Araw Ng Pasko"^{2}	Sa Araw Ng Pasko
1998	"Puso Ng Pasko"	Puso Ng Pasko Soundtrack
1999	"Laging Tapat"	Jolina
1999	"Paper Roses"	Jolina
1999	"Mahal Mo Ba Ako"	GIMIK: The Reunion Soundtrack
1999	"Kahit Anong Mangyari"^{3}	GIMIK: The Reunion Soundtrack
1999	"Chuva Choo Choo"^{4}	Hey Babe! Soundtrack
1999	"Di Ba't Pasko'y Pag-ibig?"^{2}	Di Ba't Pasko'y Pag-ibig?
2000	"Crying Time"	On Memory Lane
2000	"Too Young"	On Memory Lane
2000	"Super Pinoy"^{5}	Himig Handog Sa Bayaning Pilipino
2001	"Laging Tapat (Deep House Mix)"	Red Alert: All Hits Dance Remix
2001	"Panaginip"	Panaginip: Platinum Hits Collection
2003	"Biyahe Tayo!"^{6}	Biyahe Tayo Promo of the Department of Tourism
2003	"Tulay"	Metropop Song Festival Commemorative Album
2004	"Bahala Na"	Forever Jolina
2004	"Kapuso Sa Pasko"^{7}	Kapuso Sa Pasko: A GMA Records Christmas Album
2005	"Together Forever"^{8}	Lovestruck Soundtrack
2005	"Maybe"^{9}	Lovestruck Soundtrack
2006	"Maybe It's You" (Performance Video)	Tuloy Pa Rin Ang Awit
2006	"Maybe It's You" (Music Video)	Tuloy Pa Rin Ang Awit
2006	"Let Me Be The One"	Tuloy Pa Rin Ang Awit
2006	"Makulay Na Buhay"^{10}	Tuloy Pa Rin Ang Awit 2 Disc Special Edition
2006	"Gusto"^{11}	Tuloy Pa Rin Ang Awit
2007	"Gusto"	Tuloy Pa Rin Ang Awit
2007	"Hanggang Sa Dulo"	Batanes Soundtrack
2008	"Will Of The Wind"	Destiny
2009	"Kaya Natin Ito!"^{12}	Kaya Natin Ito!
2016	"Ikaw Ba 'Yon"	Back To Love
2016	"Tama Lang"	Himig Handog P-Pop Love Songs

- ^{1} With Marvin Agustin.
- ^{2} With All Star Cast.
- ^{3} With Gimik: The Reunion Cast.
- ^{4} With Nikki Valdez.
- ^{5} With Quarter to Five.
- ^{6} With Artists of Philippine Tourism.
- ^{7} Theme song of a series of videos for GMA Network's 2004 Christmas Station ID.
- ^{8} With the cast of Lovestruck.
- ^{9} With 604.
- ^{10}Music video made from a compilation of scenes in the series I Luv NY.
- ^{11} Used as theme song for the Khavn De La Cruz film Paalam Aking Bulalakaw.
- ^{12} All-star recording for the survivors of Typhoon Ondoy.

== Television commercials ==
This article is currently being updated, hence, the list below is partial.

Year	Company/Institution	Product	Note	Ref.
1994	Unilever Philippines	Sunsilk	"Para sa proteksyong kaibigan, Ang Shampoo, ang Sunsilk – Ang TV Girls and Ang Sunsilk!" (with Joymee Lim, Marnie Arcilla and Jane Zaleta).	
1998	AMA University	AMA Computer College	"AMA School of Today!".	
1999	A. Tung Chingco Manufacturing Corporation/Century Pacific Food	Ligo Sardines	Sosy Sardines	
1999	A. Tung Chingco Manufacturing Corporation/Century Pacific Food	Ligo Corned Beef	"Ligo Corned Beef – Delicious"	
1999	Zest-O	Zest-O Juice Drinks		
1999	Avon Philippines	Teen Scents		
1999	AMA Computer College	Image model		
2002	Republic Biscuit Corporation (Rebisco)	Rebisco Chokies		
2003	PLDT, Inc.	Make-A-Wish Cards		
2007	Unilab	Enervon		
2008	Land Bank of the Philippines	Masagana TVCs		
2008	Land Bank of the Philippines	SUSIE TVC		
2015	GlaxoSmithKline	Paracetamol (Calpol)	Go Ginhawa Mom campaign	
2016	GlaxoSmithKline	Paracetamol (Calpol)	Calpol Make No Mistake Mom Ambassadress	
2017	GlaxoSmithKline	Paracetamol (Calpol)	Basta Calpol, tough sa lagnat, gentle sa iyong anak TVCs	
2018	Alaska Milk Corporation	Alaska Fortified Powdered Milk Drink	Nasubukan n'yo na ba ang bagong Alaska Fortified?	
2018	Alaska Milk Corporation	Alaska Fortified Powdered Milk Drink	Alaska Fortified TVC 30s (with Loren Legarda).	
2019	Alaska Milk Corporation	Alaska Fortified Powdered Milk Drink	Tikas, Lakas, Talas / Uses Iñigo Pascual's "Dahil Sa'yo" as a tune of jingle	
2019	Unilab	Tiki-Tiki Syrup	TikiTiki Lang For Me (with Melai Cantiveros)	
2019	Alaska Milk Corporation	Alaska Fortified Powdered Milk Drink	Alaska Pinasulit Pack / Uses her single "Chuva Choo Choo" as tune of Jingle	
2019	Unilever Philippines	Knorr Pork Cubes	Jolina's Box Office Spaghetti with Knorr Pork Cubes	
2019	Unilever Philippines	Knorr Chicken Cubes	Jolina's Box Office Chicken Adobo with Knorr Chicken Cubes	
2019	Unilever Philippines	Lady's Choice Mayonnaise	Momshie Jolina's Classic Macaroni Salad	
