= Star Music discography =

This article lists albums and singles that were released or distributed by Star Music.

== Albums ==
=== 1995 ===
- Lalapit Na by Victor Neri
- Here at Last by Trina Belamide
- Rise Above Everything by Flippers
- Ligaw Tingin by Kamilyon
- ATBP. The Album by ATBP Kids
- Ang TV Na! Homecoming by various artists
- Pusong Sugatan by Taipan

=== 1996 ===
- Irog-Irog by Max Surban
- Jetto Aquino by Jetto Aquino
- Urge of the Human Device by Sky Church
- My First by Lindsay Custodio
- Once More (Gold Record Award) by Jamie Rivera
- Colours by Pops Fernandez
- Kindred Garden by Kindred Garden
- Ang TV Movie: The Adarna Adventure Soundtrack by various artists
- River of Penitence by Head on Collision
- Luisa by Luisa Sta. Maria
- Magbalik Ka by Belinda Cuervo
- Magic Temple (Original Motion Picture Soundtrack) by various artists

=== 1997 ===
- Really Wanna Tell You (Gold Record Award) by Tootsie Guevara
- James by James Coronel
- Akong Rosing-Ting by Max Surban & Yoyoy Villame
- Alay Sa'yo by Vic Joseph
- Meant To Be In Love by Geraldine Roxas
- 'Di Kita Iiwan by Rocky Lazatin
- Flames: The Movie (Original Motion Picture Soundtrack) (Double Platinum Award) by various artists
- Ballroom To D' Max by Max Surban
- Indio I by Indio I
- Aimee by Aimee Evangelista
- Automatic by Glue
- Lupa't Langit by Joey Ayala
- On Higher Ground (Roselle Nava album - Double Platinum Award) by Roselle Nava
- Ako Lang by Jim Paredes
- The Jerks by The Jerks
- In Stereo by Erratics
- Carol by Carol Banawa
- Waling Waling by Earth Flight
- Walang Katapat by Hagibis
- Jigsaw by Mystery
- Christmas '97: Noel (Noisy Neighbors, Mga Piling-Piling Awiting Pamasko)

=== 1998 ===
- Kung Ayaw Mo, Huwag Mo! (Original Soundtrack) by various artists
- Richard Marten by Richard Marten
- Inter Galactic Party by Immaculate Dirt
- Mabuhay Ka, Pilipino! Awit Para Sa Sentenaryo 1998 by various artists
- New Horizons by Lindsay Custodio
- Dennis Arriola by Dennis Arriola
- Nagbibinata (Original Motion Picture Soundtrack) by various artists
- Labs Kita...Okey Ka Lang? (Original Motion Picture Soundtrack) (Double Platinum Award) by various artists
- Starstruck: Star's Greatest Hits by various artists
- Intimate Mood by Jeffrey Hidalgo
- Sulyap by Noah Sindac
- Sa Araw ng Pasko (the Star Records all-star Christmas album - Platinum Record Award) by various artists
- Heart and Soul (Platinum Record) by Jeremiah
- Puso ng Pasko (Original Soundtrack) by various artists
- Mga Awiting Pamasko Medley

=== 1999 ===
- Jolina (7× Platinum Award) by Jolina Magdangal
- Mula sa Puso ni Esperanza by various artists
- Kaba (Platinum Record Award) by Tootsie Guevara
- GIMIK: The Reunion (Original Motion Picture Soundtrack) (Gold Record Award) by various artists
- Nagmamahal Pa Rin Sa 'Yo (Gold Record Award) by Pops Fernandez
- Ang Harana by Max Surban
- Feels So Right (Gold Record Award) by Jamie Rivera
- Simply Roselle (Roselle Nava album - Gold Record Award) by Roselle Nava
- Keep on Dancing: The Album by various artists
- Hey Babe! (Original Motion Picture Soundtrack) (Gold Record Award) by various artists
- Oo Na Mahal na Kung Mahal Kita by Frasco
- Pasko na Sab by Sakdap
- Ara Mina (Gold Record Award) by Ara Mina
- Starstruck, Vol. 2: Star's Greatest Hits by various artists
- Session Road by sessiOnroad
- Di Ba't Pasko'y Pag-Ibig? by various artists
- Songs Inspired by Esperanza: The Movie by various artists

=== 2000 ===
- On Memory Lane (6× Platinum Award) by Jolina Magdangal
- Pakita Mo by Randy Santiago
- Nikki Valdez by Nikki Valdez
- JCS (John, Carlo and Stefano) by JCS
- Shaina by Shaina Magdayao
- Groove-a-Pella by III of a Kind
- Unaware, Unwarned by Sky Church
- Anak Official Soundtrack by various artists
- Komedya Karambola by Max Surban
- Jeremiah by Jeremiah
- Can This Be Love by Jeffrey Hidalgo
- CAROL Repackaged (Platinum Record) by Carol Banawa
- Love is Right by Janet Basco
- Jimmy Bondoc by Jimmy Bondoc
- Teenhearts by Teenhearts
- Ibigay Mo Na by Jessa Zaragoza
- Sa Puso Ko by Tootsie Guevara
- One Day Heartache by Gilbert Golez
- Tin Arnaldo by Tin Arnaldo
- Mari by Marri Nallos
- Starstruck, Vol. 3: Star's Greatest Hits by various artists
- World Youth Day...Emmanuel by Various Artists
- Tanging Yaman: Inspirational Album by Various Artists

=== 2001 ===
- Heal Our Land by Jamie Rivera
- Heavenly Ara Mina by Ara Mina
- Kailan Mo Ako Mamahalin by Rocky Lazatin
- Red Alert by Jolina Magdangal
- Kundiman by various artists
- Respect by Dessa
- Genuflect by Formula
- Seasons by Jamie Rivera
- Star OPM Power Hits by various artists

=== 2002 ===
- All About Love (Roselle Nava album - Platinum Record) by Roselle Nava
- Best Of STAR OPM Revival Hits Volume 2 by various artists
- Freshmen by Freshmen
- Jolina Sings the Masters by Jolina Magdangal
- Himig Handog Love Songs by various artists

=== 2003 ===
- Follow Your Heart by Carol Banawa
- Only Selfless Love by Jamie Rivera
- Star OPM Duets by various artists
- The Brightest Stars Of Christmas by various artists
- The Power of Four by various artists

=== 2004 ===
- A Better Me by Divo Bayer
- Ang Tanging Ina Nyo by Ai-Ai delas Alas
- Ako Si by Gloc-9
- Ang Tunay na Idol by April Boy Regino
- Come In Out of the Rain by Sheryn Regis (Platinum Record Award)
- Purpose Driven Life by Jamie Rivera
- Reel Love by Erik Santos and Sheryn Regis
- Star OPM Power Hits Vol. 3 by various artists
- This Is the Moment by Erik Santos

=== 2005 ===
- Graduation Day by Blue Ketchup
- Loving You Now by Erik Santos
- Pinoy Champs by various artists
- Pure Heart by Gary Valenciano
- Soulful by Ella May Saison
- Top Male OPM Hits by various artists
- What I Do Best by Sheryn Regis (Gold Record Award)

=== 2006 ===
- Sam Milby by Sam Milby
- Star OPM Power Hits Vol. 4 by various artists
- The Modern Jukebox Collection by Sheryn Regis

=== 2007 ===
- A Little Too Perfect by Sam Milby
- All I Want This Christmas by Erik Santos
- Chad Peralta by Chad Peralta
- Judy Ann Santos-Musika Ng Buhay Ko by various artists
- Para Lang Sa'Yo by Aiza Seguerra
- Prithibir Rang by Alaap Dudul Saikia
- Salamat by Yeng Constantino
- Sana Maulit Muli (Official Soundtrack) by various artists

=== 2008 ===
- A Gary Valenciano All-Star Tribute Collection by various artists
- Charice by Charice
- Charlie Green by Charlie Green
- Maging Sino Ka Man: Ang Pagbabalik: Original Teleserye Soundtrack by various artists
- Musika At Pelikula – A Star Cinema Classic Collection by various artists
- Open Arms by Aiza Seguerra
- Paano Na Kaya by Bugoy Drilon
- PDA Season 2 Scholars Sing Cayabyab by Pinoy Dream Academy (season 2) scholars
- Silver Lining by Acel Van Ommen
- The Real Me by Bea Alonzo
- Your Love: Limited Platinum Edition Repackaged by Erik Santos
- Starting Over Again by Sheryn Regis

=== 2009 ===
- Aiza Seguerra Live by Aiza Seguerra
- My Inspiration by Charice
- Journey To The Heart by Fatima Soriano
- May Bukas Pa (Conversations Of Bro & Santino) by various artists

=== 2010 ===
- 3 A.M. by 3 A.M.
- Bugoy Drilon by Bugoy Drilon
- I Star 15 Anniversary Collection: The Best Of Dance Novelty Songs by various artists
- My Music My Life Carol Banawa by Carol Banawa
- Showtime: The Album by various artists
- Ngayong Pasko Magniningning Ang Pilipino by various artists

=== 2011 ===
- Angeline Quinto by Angeline Quinto
- Angeline Quinto: Patuloy Ang Pangarap by Angeline Quinto
- Bida Best Hits Da Best by various artists
- Da Best Ang Pasko Ng Pilipino by various artists
- I LOVE YOU by various artists
- Nang Dahil sa Pag-ibig by Bugoy Drilon
- Songs From The Vault by Aiza Seguerra
- We Are Whatever by Bret Jackson and James Reid
- With Love by Gary Valenciano
- Visions by Fatima Soriano

=== 2012 ===
- A Beautiful Affair Official Soundtrack by various artists
- Dahil Sa Pag-Ibig Official Soundtrack by various artists
- Daniel Padilla by Daniel Padilla
- Fall In Love Again by Angeline Quinto
- Hanggang Ngayon by Bryan Termulo
- OPM Number 1s: Volume 3 by various artists
- Love Songs From Princess And I Teleserye by various artists

=== 2013 ===
- Apoy Sa Dagat Official Soundtrack by various artists
- Chapter – 10 by Charice
- DJP by Daniel Padilla
- Enrique Gil: King of the Gil by Enrique Gil
- Himig Handog P-Pop Love Songs by various artists
- Higher Love by Angeline Quinto
- Kahit Konting Pagtingin Official Soundtrack by various artists
- Muling Buksan Ang Puso: The Official Soundtrack by various artists
- The Erik Santos Collection by Erik Santos

=== 2014 ===
- Got to Believe: The Official Soundtrack by various artists
- Star Cinema 20th Commemorative Album by various artists
- Renzo Vergara by Renzo Vergara
- Dyesebel: The Official Soundtrack by various artists
- Ikaw Lamang: The Official Soundtrack by various artists
- Celestine by Toni Gonzaga
- Himig Handog P-Pop Love Songs 2014 by various artists
- Kathryn by Kathryn Bernardo

=== 2015 ===
- I Feel Good by Daniel Padilla
- Back to Love by Jolina Magdangal
- Morissette by Morissette

=== 2016 ===
- DJ Greatest Hits by Daniel Padilla
- FPJ's Ang Probinsyano: The Official Soundtrack by various artists

=== 2018 ===
- Malaya by Moira Dela Torre

=== 2019 ===
- Feels Trip by Agsunta
- Ang Soundtrack Ng Bahay Mo by various artists

=== 2020 ===
- Patawad by Moira Dela Torre

=== 2021 ===
- Connected Na Tayo (Ang Soundtrack Ng Bahay Mo Vol. 2) by various artists
- Unloving U (Official Soundtrack) by various artists
- Marry Me, Marry You (Official Soundtrack) by various artists
- New Views by Kyle Echarri
- Click, Like, Share (Original Soundtrack) by various artists
- Piece of the Puzzle by Trisha Denise
- My Sunset Girl (Original Soundtrack) by Anji Salvacion and KD Estrada
- K1N5E by Six Part Invention
- The Light by BGYO
- Born to Win by Bini
- Saying Goodbye (Official Soundtrack) by SAB and Angela Ken
- Love is Color Blind (Official Soundtrack) by Belle Mariano and SAB

=== 2022 ===
- maybe forever by Jeremy G
- Zephanie by Zephanie
- Gigi De Lana by Gigi De Lana
- Bola Bola (Original Soundtrack) by BGYO, KD Estrada, and Akira Morishita
- How To Move On in 30 Days (Original Soundtrack) by Jeremy G and Angela Ken
- Kasingkasing Dalampasigan by Anji Salvacion
- Run To Me (Official Soundtrack) by Alexa Ilacad and KD Estrada
- Love In 40 Days (Official Soundtrack) by various artists
- WTF I actually wrote these songs by Janine Berdin
- Lyric and Beat, Vol. 1 (Official Soundtrack) by various artists
- Feel Good by Bini
- Be Us by BGYO
- She by Sheryn Regis

== Extended plays ==
=== 2021 ===
- Born to Win - EP by Bini

=== 2024 ===
- Talaarawan by Bini

== Singles ==
=== 2013 ===
- Mula sa Puso by the ABS-CBN Philharmonic Orchestra

=== 2014 ===
- Bakit Pa Ba by Gab Maturan
- 'Di Mapaliwanag by Morissette

=== 2016 ===
- Something I Need by Morissette and Piolo Pascual
- Baby I Love Your Way by Morissette and Harana

=== 2018 ===
- Panaginip by Morissette

=== 2019 ===
- Bagong Umaga by Agsunta
- Papara by Morissette
- Miss Kita Kung Christmas by Morissette and ST. WOLF
- Diyan Ba Sa Langit by Morissette, Jason Dy, and KIKX

=== 2020 ===
- Kapamilya Forever by Angelo Anilao
- Pag-Ibig Ang Hihilom Sa Daigdig by Raizo Chabeldin and Biv De Vera
- Bawal Lumabas (The Classroom Song) by Kim Chiu
- Akin Ka Na Lang (Latin Version) by Morissette
- Ang Sa Iyo Ay Akin (From "Ang Sa Iyo Ay Akin") by Aegis
- Yakapin Ang Pasko by Bernadette Sembrano
- Ikaw ang Liwanag at Ligaya by various artists
- Da Coconut Nut by Bini

=== 2021 ===
- Bagong Umaga by KZ Tandingan
- Huwag Kang Mangamba by Angeline Quinto
- The Light by BGYO
- Pwede Na Ba by KVN
- He's Into Her by BGYO
- The Baddest by BGYO
- Yakap by Bernadette Sembrano
- Kimmi by Kim Chiu and DJ M.O.D.
- Feel Good Pilipinas by KZ Tandingan and BGYO
- Feel Good Pilipinas (Extended Remix) by KZ Tandingan and BGYO
- Runnin' by BGYO and Keiko Necesario
- While We Are Young by BGYO
- Kulay (Miss Universe Philippines 2021) by BGYO
- Born to Win by Bini
- Kapit Lang by Bini
- Golden Arrow by Bini
- Na Na Na by Bini
- Pinoy Tayo by Rico Blanco
- Sikat Ang Pinoy by Agsunta and Kritiko
- Kabataang Pinoy by Nameless Kids
- Nasa'yo Ako by Gigi De Lana
- Sakalam by Gigi De Lana and the GigiVibes Band
- Andito Tayo Para Sa Isa't Isa by various artists
- Shine (25th Anniversary Version) by Morissette

=== 2022 ===
- It's Okay Not To Be Okay by Angela Ken
- Gusto Ko Nang Bumitaw (From "The Broken Marriage Vow") by Morissette
- Misteryo by KD Estrada and Alexa Ilacad
- When I See You Again by KD Estrada and Alexa Ilacad
- Kabataang Pinoy by Bini and SB19
- Dalampasigan by Anji Salvacion
- Up! by Bini and BGYO
- Pit a Pat by Bini
- Lagi by Bini
- I Feel Good by Bini
- Best Time by BGYO
- Life's A Beach - From "Beach Bros" by Jeremy G and Nameless Kids
- Huwag Mo Kong Iwan by Ogie Alcasid
- Para Sa'yo by Shanaia Gomez
- Kundi Ikaw by Seth Fedelin
- Tumitigil Ang Mundo by BGYO
- Patuloy Lang Ang Lipad (Theme of "Darna") by BGYO
- Magnet by BGYO

=== 2023 ===
- Karera by Bini
- Pantropiko by Bini

=== 2024 ===
- Pantintero by BGYO
- Salamin Salamin by Bini
