= List of awards and nominations received by Jolina Magdangal =

Jolina Magdangal awards and nominations
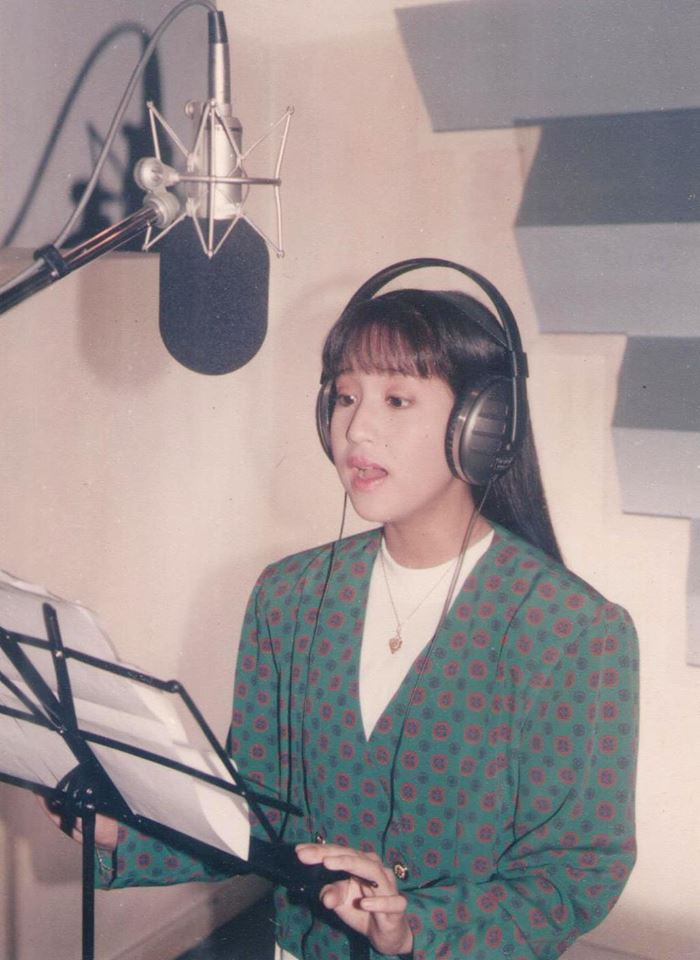
- Magdangal in 1990s
Awards and nominations
Award	Wins	Nominations
Box Office Entertainment Awards	7	7
FAMAS Awards	2	2
Philippine Association of the Record Industry	10	10
PMPC Star Awards for Television	5	25
MTV Pilipinas Music Awards	1	1
PMPC Star Awards for Music	1	4
Metro Manila Film Festival	1	2
ComGuild Academe's Choice Awards	3	3

Totals (Note: Certain award groups do not simply award one winner. They acknowledge several different recipients, have runners-up, and have third place. Since this is a specific recognition and is different from losing an award, runner-up mentions are considered wins in this award tally. For simplification and to avoid errors, each award in this list has been presumed to have had a prior nomination.)
- Wins: 81
- Nominations: 125

Filipino singer Jolina Magdangal has been honored with numerous accolades throughout her career, as a musical artist, actress, host and entrepreneur. Magdangal has been recognized not just in the Philippine entertainment industry but also across Asia and received various awards including 2 FAMAS Awards, an Asian Television Awards, and around 15 government recognitions to her credit. She has won over 80 awards across hundreds of nominations.

== Music and Entertainment Awards ==
=== Philippine Association of the Record Industry ===
Record
Year released	Work	Award	Organization	Result
1997	F.L.A.M.E.S.: The Movie (Soundtrack)	2× Platinum	Record label (Star Records)	Won
1998	Labs Kita... Okey Ka Lang? (Soundtrack)	2× Platinum	Philippine Association of the Record Industry (PARI)	Won
1999	Jolina^{1} ^{2}	7× Platinum	Philippine Association of the Record Industry (PARI)	Won
1999	GIMIK: The Reunion (Soundtrack)	Gold	Philippine Association of the Record Industry (PARI)	Won
2000	On Memory Lane^{2} ^{3}	6× Platinum	Philippine Association of the Record Industry (PARI)	Won
2001	Red Alert: All Hits Dance Remix	Gold	Philippine Association of the Record Industry (PARI)	Won
2001	Panaginip: Platinum Hits Collection	Gold	Philippine Association of the Record Industry (PARI)	Won
2002	Jolina Sings The Masters'	Gold	Philippine Association of the Record Industry (PARI)	Won
2004	Forever Jolina	Gold	Philippine Association of the Record Industry (PARI)	Won
2016	Back To Love	Gold	Philippine Association of the Record Industry (PARI)	Won

- ^{1}Declared by PARI as 1999's biggest commercial success
- ^{2}Listed as one of the best selling albums of all time in the Philippines.
- ^{3}One of the finest albums ever produced in the Philippines.

Notes:

- Awards of 'compilation records' and 'records of other artists' where Magdangal appeared are not included in this list. Examples are PARI certifications of Star Records's Christmas albums; and other compilation records, among others.
- Reflected in this article are the actual certifications given by the record label or the Philippine Association of the Record Industry using the existing thresholds during the year the albums were released. Adjustments for inflation are not reflected in this article.

=== Industry Awards ===
Industry Awards
Year	Nominated work	Award	Organization	Result
2002	"Nasaan Ka Man"	Best Original Theme Song	2002 Metro Manila Film Festival	Won
2004	"Bahala Na"	Favorite Female Artist Award	2004 MTV Pilipinas	Won
2004	"Bahala Na"	Music Video of the Year	17th Awit Awards	Nominated
2008	"Alinlangan"	Best Song Written for Movie/TV/Stage Play	21st Awit Awards	Nominated
2008	"Hanggang Sa Dulo"	Movie Theme Song of the Year	24th PMPC Star Awards for Movies	Nominated
2009	"Hanggang Kailan"	Song of the Year	1st PMPC Star Awards for Music	Nominated
2009	"Buksan Ang 'Yong Puso"	Best Song Written for Movie/TV/Stage Play	22nd Awit Awards	Nominated
2016	Back To Love	Best Cover Album of the Year	8th PMPC Star Awards for Music	Nominated
2016	Back To Love	Best Album of the Year	8th PMPC Star Awards for Music	Nominated
2016	Back To Love	Best Female Recording Artist of the Year	8th PMPC Star Awards for Music	Won
2017	"Chuva Choo Choo 2.0"	Best Novelty Recording	30th Awit Awards	Nominated

=== Popular awards ===
Popular Awards
Year	Nominated work	Award	Organization	Result
1996	Herself	Singing Idol	Movie Idol Magazine	Won
1998	Herself	Best Young Female Performer	Parangal Ng Bayan	Won
1998	Herself	Most Promising Female Performer	28th Box Office Entertainment Awards	Won
1999	Herself	Outstanding Female Recording Star of 1999	Peoples Network and Media Communications	Won
2000	"Super Pinoy"	Youth's Choice Award	Himig Handog Sa Bayaning Pilipino	Won
2000	"Super Pinoy"	Overseas Filipino Worker's Choice Award	Himig Handog Sa Bayaning Pilipino	Won
2000	Herself	Most Popular Singer	30th Box Office Entertainment Awards	Won
2000	Herself	Entertainer of the Year	30th Box Office Entertainment Awards	Won
2001	Herself	Most Popular Female Star	Catholic Bishops' Conference of the Philippines	Won
2005	Herself	Ultimate Birit Award	Kapuso Viewer's Choice Awards	Won
2005	"Annie Batungbakal"	Best Dance Recording	SOP Music Awards	Won
2016	"Tama Lang"	4th Best Song	Himig Handog P-Pop Love Songs	4th Place

== Television Awards ==
=== Industry Awards ===
Industry Awards
Year	Nominated work	Award	Organization	Result
1998	Maalaala Mo Kaya (Episode:"Gitara")	Best Single Performance by an Actress	12th PMPC Star Awards for Television	Nominated
2002	Arriba, Arriba!	Best Comedy Actress	16th PMPC Star Awards for Television	Nominated
2003	Magpakailanman (Episode: Pasakalye ng Isang Pangarap)	Best Single Performance by an Actress	17th PMPC Star Awards for Television	Nominated
2003	A Joli(na) Christmas: A Jolina Magdangal Christmas Special	Best Musical Special	17th PMPC Star Awards for Television	Nominated
2004	Magpakailanman (Episode: Pasakalye ng Isang Pangarap)	Best Drama Performance by an Actress	2004 Asian Television Awards	Highly Commended
2004	StarStruck Kids	Best Talent Search Program Host	18th PMPC Star Awards for Television	Won
2005	Unang Hirit	Best Morning Show Host	19th PMPC Star Awards for Television	Nominated
2006	StarStruck: The Nationwide Invasion	Best Talent Search Program Host(s)	20th PMPC Star Awards for Television	Nominated
2006	Unang Hirit	Best Morning Show Host	20th PMPC Star Awards for Television	Nominated
2007	StarStruck: The Next Level	Best Talent Search Program Host	21st PMPC Star Awards for Television	Won
2007	Unang Hirit	Best Morning Show Host(s)	21st PMPC Star Awards for Television	Nominated
2008	Unang Hirit	Best Morning Show Host(s)	22nd PMPC Star Awards for Television	Won
2009	Unang Hirit	Best Morning Show Host(s}	23rd PMPC Star Awards for Television	Nominated
2013	Personalan: Ang Unang Hakbang	Best Public Affairs Program Host(s)	27th PMPC Star Awards for Television	Nominated
2014	Personalan: Ang Unang Hakbang	Best Public Affairs Program Host(s)	28th PMPC Star Awards for Television	Nominated
2015	FlordeLiza	Best Drama Actress	29th PMPC Star Awards for Television	Nominated
2016	ASAP	Best Female Host	30th PMPC Star Awards for Television	Nominated
2016	Magandang Buhay	Best Celebrity Talk Show Host(s)	30th PMPC Star Awards for Television	Nominated
2017	ASAP	Best Female Host	31st PMPC Star Awards for Television	Nominated
2017	Magandang Buhay	Best Celebrity Talk Show Host(s)	31st PMPC Star Awards for Television	Nominated
2018	ASAP	Best Female Host	32nd PMPC Star Awards for Television	Nominated
2018	Magandang Buhay	Best Celebrity Talk Show Host(s)	32nd PMPC Star Awards for Television	Nominated
2019	Magandang Buhay	Best Celebrity Talk Show Host(s)	33rd PMPC Star Awards for Television	Nominated
2021	Magandang Buhay	Best Celebrity Talk Show Host(s)	34th PMPC Star Awards for Television	Nominated
2023	Magandang Buhay	Best Celebrity Talk Show Host(s)	35th PMPC Star Awards for Television	Won

=== Popular Awards ===
Popular Awards
Year	Nominated work	Award	Organization	Result
2004	Narito Ang Puso Ko	Outstanding Lead Actress in a Drama Series	Golden Screen Entertainment Awards for Television	Nominated
2016	Magandang Buhay	Advertiser's Friendly Morning Talk Show Hosts	ComGuild Academe's Choice Awards	Won
2017	Magandang Buhay	Advertisers Friendly Morning Show Host(s)	ComGuild Media Awards	Won
2017	Magandang Buhay	Best Entertainment Talk Show Host(s)	7th EdukCircle Awards	Won
2017	ASAP	Best Female Variety Show Host	7th EdukCircle Awards	Nominated
2018	Magandang Buhay	Best Entertainment Talk Show Host(s)	8th EdukCircle Awards	Nominated
2018	ASAP	Best Female Variety Show Host	8th EdukCircle Awards	Nominated
2018	Magandang Buhay	Pinakamagiting na Personalidad ng Talk Show	6th Kagitingan Awards for Television (Bataan Peninsula State University)	Won
2018	Magandang Buhay	Advertiser's Friendly Morning Show Host(s)	ComGuild Academe's Choice Awards	Won
2019	Magandang Buhay	Best Entertainment Talk Show Host	9th EdukCircle Awards	Nominated
2019	Magandang Buhay	Advertiser's Friendly Morning Show Host(s)	ComGuild Academe's Choice Awards	Won

== Film Awards ==
=== Industry Awards ===
Industry Awards
Year	Nominated work	Award	Organization	Result
1998	Puso ng Pasko	Best Supporting Actress	1998 Metro Manila Film Festival	Nominated
2005	Annie B.	Best Actress in Musical or Comedy	Entertainment Press' Golden Screen Awards (ENPRESS)	Nominated

=== Popular Awards ===
Popular Awards
Year	Nominated work	Award	Organization	Result
2001	Tunay na Tunay: Gets Mo? Gets Ko!	Princess of RP Movies	31st Box Office Entertainment Awards	Won
2003	Kung Ikaw Ay Isang Panaginip	Princess of Philippine Movies	33rd Box Office Entertainment Awards	Won
2019	Herself (with Marvin Agustin)	Love Team Ng Sentenaryo	Film Development Council of the Philippines's Sine Sandaan	Included

== Other awards and recognitions ==
=== Industry Awards ===
Industry Awards
Year	Nominated work	Award	Organization	Result
1999	Herself	Youth Achievement Award	47th FAMAS Awards	Won
2000	Herself	Darling of the Press	14th PMPC Star Awards for Television	Won
2007	Herself	Golden Artist Award	55th FAMAS Awards	Won

=== Popular Awards ===
Popular Awards
Year	Nominated work	Award	Organization	Result
2002	Herself	Youth Achievement Award	32nd Box Office Entertainment Awards	Won
2004	Herself	Youth Achievement Award	34th Box Office Entertainment Awards	Won
2005	Herself	Anak TV Seal Awardee	Southeast Asian Foundation for Children and Television	Won
2005	Adarna: The Mythical Bird	Pioneer in Animation Award	MOWELFUND and United Animators, Inc.	Included
2005	Herself	Serviam Award (Paragon of a Socially Conscious Performing Artist)	The Catholic Mass Media Awards	Won
2007	Herself	Gawad Dangal ng Kabataan	Pampelikulang Samahan ng mga Dalubguro (PASADO)	Won
2007	Herself	Philippine Paradise of Stars	German Moreno and Mowelfund	Included
2009	Herself	Philippine's Walk of Fame	German Moreno and Eastwood City	Included

== Government Merits ==
Government recognitions
Year	Award	Organization
1996	Gintong Kabataan	Presidential Youth Development Council, Office of the President of the Philippines
1997	Outstanding Pinoy Award	Provincial Government of Bulacan
1997	Galing Ng Pinoy Award	People's Television Network
1998	Gawad KKK Awardee (Outstanding Youth in the field of Entertainment)	National Centennial Commission
1998	National Youth Advocate	Department of Health
1999	^{1}Gintong Kabataan Awardee	Presidential Youth Development Council (Office of the President), Young Achievers and Professionals Foundation
1999	Outstanding Youth Award	Local Government of Norzagaray, Bulacan
2001	Official Youth Spokesperson	Office of the President of the Philippines
2001	^{2}Medal of Honor as Youth Role Model	National Youth Day Commission, KASAMA
2001	^{3}Plaque of Recognition as Youth Role Model	Government Service Insurance System (GSIS)
2001	^{4}Plaque of Recognition as Youth Role Model and Exemplary Service in Support of the Muslim Community	Office on Muslim Affairs
2001	Youth Role Model Award	Office of the President of the Philippines, Committee on Cultural Affairs
2002	Appointed as the first ever National Youth Advocate	National Youth Commission
2004	Medal of Honor	National Youth Commission
2007	Gintong Kabataan Award	Provincial Government of Bulacan

- ^{1}Awarded by First Lady of the Philippines, Dr. Loi Ejercito
- ^{2}Awarded by Sen. Francisco Tatad
- ^{3}Awarded by its president and General Manager, Mr. Winston F. Garcia
- ^{4}Awarded by its Executive Director, Mr. Habib Mujahab A. Hashim

=== Magazines and internet media ===
Popular Awards
Year	Nominated work	Award	Organization	Result
2004	Herself	Young Female Superstar	Yes! Magazine	Won
2005	Herself	Celebrity Home of the Year	Yes! Magazine	Nominated
2005	Herself	Young Female Superstar	Yes! Magazine	Nominated
2005	Herself	Most Fashionale Female Celebrity	Yes! Magazine	Nominated
2007	Herself	Listed No. 13th in Distinct Style List	100 Magazine	Included
2008	Herself	100 Most Beautiful Stars	Yes! Magazine	Included
2009	Herself	100 Most Beautiful Stars	Yes! Magazine	Included
2010	Herself	100 Most Beautiful Stars	Yes! Magazine	Included
2016	Herself (In a Mark Bumgarner gown during the 2016 Star Magic Ball)	Best in Bows	Preview Magazine	Recognition
2016	Herself	Magdangal's cultural impact listed No. 2 in the list of "33 Things You'll Know If You're A Filipino"	Buzzfeed Philippines	Included
2017	Herself	100 Most Beautiful Stars	Yes! Magazine	Included
2018	Herself	100 Most Beautiful Stars	Yes! Magazine	Included
2019	Herself	Silver Creator Award (Silver Play Button)	YouTube	Awarded

=== Others ===
Other awards and recognitions
Year	Nominated work	Award	Organization	Result
1997	Herself	Outstanding Artist Award	ABS-CBN Broadcasting Network	Won
1997	Herself	Friendship Award	ABS-CBN Talent Center	Won
1997	Herself	Outstanding Service Awards	FBLG Middle School of Guam, U.S.A.	Won
1997	Herself	Young Achiever Award	Foundation for Gifted Children	Won
1997	Herself	Outstanding Student Award	AMA Computer College	Won
1998	Herself	Star Student Award	AMA Computer College	Won
1999	Herself	Certificate of International Accreditation	National Computer Center of the United Kingdom	Won
2000	Herself	Image Model of the Year Award	Preview Modeling Agency	Won
2001	Herself	Exemplary Award for Academic, Entertainment and Civic Achievements	Polytechnic University of the Philippines (College Of Communication)	Won
2001	Herself	Outstanding Young Entrepreneur Award	Polytechnic University of the Philippines (On its 98th Anniversary)	Won
2002	Herself	Ambassadress of Goodwill	Angel's Home / Foundation of Our Lady of Peace Missions	Won
2013	Herself	Gintong Palad Service Award	Movie Writers Welfare Foundation	Included
2019	Herself	Pagkilala re: Breastfeeding Advocacy	Manila Medical Center Department of Pediatrics	Recognition

== Honorific titles ==
Honorific titles
Name	Title	Ref.
Jolina Magdangal	Queen of Pinoy Pop Culture	
Jolina Magdangal	Pop Icon	
Jolina Magdangal	Queen of the 90s	
Jolina Magdangal	Princess of Hearts	
Jolina Magdangal	Millenium Superstar	
Jolina Magdangal	The original Teen Queen	
Jolina Magdangal	Multimedia Superstar	
Jolina Magdangal	Princess of Philippine Movies	
Jolina Magdangal	Queen of Star Music	
