= Follow Your Heart =

Follow Your Heart may refer to:

== Film and television ==
- Follow Your Heart (1936 film), an American musical directed by Aubrey Scotto
- Follow Your Heart (1996 film), an Italian romantic drama directed by Cristina Comencini
- Follow Your Heart, a 1999 film starring Leah Remini
- Follow Your Heart (TV program), a 2017 Philippine reality show

== Literature ==
- Follow Your Heart (novel), a 1994 novel by Susanna Tamaro
- Follow Your Heart, a 1998 novel by Raynetta Mañees

== Music ==
=== Albums ===
- Follow Your Heart, by The Sons, 1971
- Follow Your Heart (Carol Banawa album), 2003
- Follow Your Heart (Cubic Zirconia album) or the title song, 2011
- Follow Your Heart (Nikki Webster album) or the title song, 2001
- Follow Your Heart, by Mario Frangoulis, 2004

=== Songs ===
- "Follow Your Heart" (song), by Triumph, 1984
- "Follow Your Heart", by Gino Conforti and Anúna from the Thumbelina film soundtrack, 1994
- "Follow Your Heart", by Holly Johnson from Europa, 2014
- "Follow Your Heart", by Joe Farrell from Joe Farrell Quartet, 1970
- "Follow Your Heart", by Scorpions from Born to Touch Your Feelings: Best of Rock Ballads, 2017

== Other uses ==
- Follow Your Heart (company), an American vegan food company
