= Whenever You Call =

"Whenever You Call" may refer to:

- "Whenever You Call" (Arashi song), 2020
- "Whenever You Call" (Mariah Carey song), 1997
- "Whenever You Call", a song by Jolina Magdangal from her 2006 album Tuloy Pa Rin Ang Awit
