= Labs Kita, Okey Ka Lang? =

1998 film by Jerry Lopez Sineneng

- Theatrical release poster
- Directed by: Jerry Lopez Sineneng
- Screenplay by: Ricardo Lee
- Story by: Enrico Santos; Tammy Bejerano; Jerry Lopez Sineneng
- Produced by: Malou N. Santos
- Starring: Jolina Magdangal; Marvin Agustin
- Cinematography: Joe Batac
- Edited by: Marya Ignacio
- Music by: Nonong Buencamino
- Production company: Star Cinema
- Distributed by: Star Cinema
- Release date: August 26, 1998
- Running time: 105 minutes
- Country: Philippines
- Language: Filipino

Labs Kita, Okey Ka Lang? (transl. I Labs You, Are You Okay?) is a 1998 Filipino romantic comedy drama film co-written and directed by Jerry Lopez Sineneng. The screenplay written by Ricky Lee was adapted from a story written and developed by Enrico C. Santos, Tammy Bejerano, and Sineneng. The film, which was entirely shot in the city of Baguio, stars Jolina Magdangal and Marvin Agustin in their third film together as love team partner, and are joined by Hilda Koronel, Ronaldo Valdez, and Gina Pareño.

Produced and released by Star Cinema, the film became a movie reference for best friends falling in love with each other. It was theatrically released on August 26, 1998.

In January 2017, the film was digitally restored and remastered by ABS-CBN Film Restoration, in partnership with Central Digital Lab.

== Plot ==
Bujoy and Ned, lifelong best friends, share a deep bond, but their paths diverge as they chase different dreams. Bujoy secretly loves Ned, dedicating her clay sculptures to him, while Ned pours his passion for music into songs inspired by his crush, Mary Ann.

Ned's musical aspirations, inherited from his father, face resistance from his practical mother. When Ned starts dating Marry Anne, Bujoy begins seeing Cenon, a new band member. However, Ned starts to recognize his true feelings for Bujoy.

The story explores whether they can overcome their circumstances and be honest about their emotions or if their relationship will remain purely platonic.

== Cast ==
=== Main cast ===
- Jolina Magdangal as Bujoy
- Marvin Agustin as Ned
- Hilda Koronel as Marissa, Bujoy's mother
- Ronaldo Valdez as Kanor
- Gina Pareño as Cora

=== Supporting ===
- Meryll Soriano as Mayo
- Gio Alvarez as Cenon
- Vanessa Del Bianco as Mary Ann
- Migui Moreno as Erwin
- Vhong Navarro as Jason
- Jeffrey Hidalgo as Ice

== Soundtrack ==
The accompanying soundtrack album to the film was released on July 24, 1998, by Star Music, a month before the official theatrical release of the film itself. Mid August, the album was awarded with a gold record certification, few weeks before the film debuted in theaters, and was expected to reach at least a platinum record. Eventually, it was awarded with a 2× platinum certification from the Philippine Association of the Record Industry on May 20, 1999. The album is considered as one of the most popular soundtrack albums in the Philippines spawning such radio hits as the Jolina Magdangal-original "Kapag Ako Ay Nagmahal" and boy band Jeremiah's "Naghihinayang".

=== Track listing ===
No.	Title	Writer(s)	Length
1.	"Kapag Ako Ay Nagmahal" (Recorded by Jolina Magdangal)	Larry S. Hermoso	4:24
2.	"Girl of My Dreams" (Recorded by Jeremiah)	Larry S. Hermoso	4:31
3.	"Hindi Kita Puwedeng Mahalin" (Recorded by Girl Talk)	Larry S. Hermoso	5:36
4.	"Kanino Ba?" (Recorded by Jolina Magdangal)	Freddie Saturno	3:32
5.	"Dahil Mahal Na Mahal Kita" (Recorded by 92 A.D.)	Larry S. Hermoso	4:51
6.	"Nanghihinayang" (Recorded by Jeremiah)	Larry S. Hermoso	4:46
7.	"Tingnan Mo Naman Ako" (Recorded by Jolina Magdangal)	Larry S. Hermoso	4:01
8.	"Sa Ilalim ng Puno ng Sayote" (Recorded by Blusero Band)	Raymon Kutch	5:01
9.	"First Time" (Recorded by Girl Talk)	Larry S. Hermoso	4:31
10.	"Kapag Ako Ay Nagmahal (finale)" (Orchestra conducted by Rodney Ambat)	Larry S. Hermoso
11.	"Kapag Ako Ay Nagmahal (vocal finale)" (Recorded by Jolina Magdangal)	Larry S. Hermoso
Total length:			42:00

=== Commercial performance ===
In mid-August 1998, the album was awarded with a gold record certification, few weeks before the film itself debuted in theaters, and was expected to reach at least a platinum record. Eventually, it was awarded with a 2× platinum certification from the Philippine Association of the Record Industry on May 20, 1999. The album produced the Magdangal signature song "Kapag Ako Ay Nagmahal".

=== Personnel ===
Adapted from the Labs Kita... Okey Ka Lang? Original Motion Picture Soundtrack liner notes.

- Larry S. Hermoso – album producer
- Buddy Medina – executive producer
- Rene A. Salta – a&r supervision
- Gerald Michael Y. Portacio – production supervision
- Alvin C. Nunez – arranger (tracks 1, 2, 4, 7, 9)
- Dennis S. Quila – arranger (tracks 3, 6)
- Moi Ortiz – vocal arrangement (track 5)
- Blusero Band – arranger (track 8)
- Joy C. Marfil – orchestral arrangement (track 10), vocal arrangement (track 11)
- Nikki Cunanan – recording engineer (tracks 1, 2, 5, 6, 9)
- Efren San Pedro – recording engineer (tracks 1, 2, 6, 10, 11)
- Christopher Navarro – recording engineer (tracks 3, 4, 7)
- Joel Mendoza – recording engineer (tracks 3, 6, 9)
- Don Manalang – recording engineer (track 8)
- Jeffrey Feliz – recording engineer (track 8)
- Dante San Pedro – mixing engineer (tracks 1, 2, 5, 7, 9, 10, 11)
- Jerry Joanino – mixing engineer (tracks 3, 4, 6)
- Jun Reyes – mixing engineer (track 8)
- Matt Rosanes – cover & lay-out design
