= Carol Banawa =

Filipino actress

- Born: Carol Claire Aguilar Banawa; March 4, 1981 (age 45)
- Education: Northern Virginia Community College (A.A.S.); Grand Canyon University (BSN)
- Occupations: Singer; actress; nurse
- Years active: 1994–present
- Spouse: Ryan Cristomo (m. 2006)
- Children: 3
- Musical career
- Origin: Pasay, Metro Manila, Philippines
- Years active: 1994–2010
- Label: Star Music (1994–2010)

Carol Claire Aguilar Banawa-Crisostomo (born March 4, 1981) is a Filipino actress, former singer and nurse currently based in United States. She is a Star Magic Batch 4 alumna.

== Early life and career ==
Carol Claire Aguilar Banawa was raised in Batangas, she has two siblings, Alexander and Cherry. Banawa started singing when she was a little girl while her family lived in Saudi Arabia. Her family then moved back to the Philippines. There, she was invited to join the new roster of ABS-CBN stars through the children-oriented show Ang TV.

She has performed at the Madison Square Garden in New York City at the 2003 New York Music Festival.

In 2004, Pinoyvision Records Released: her Platinum Hits Collection album, a compilation of her songs. The album also comes with a VCD of Banawa's hit music videos such as "Stay", "Ocean Deep" and "Noon at Ngayon".

In 2010, she made her comeback in the music industry, and starred in the hit Philippine TV series, Mara Clara, where she sang the opening song of the said TV series. She also covered Till My Heartaches End, the theme song of the 2010 film of the same name.

In 2016, her song "Bakit 'Di Totohanin" was featured in one of the scenes of the U.S. drama series The Vampire Diaries.

== Personal life ==
Banawa is married to Ryan Crisostomo and they have three children together.

=== Hiatus and nursing career ===
Banawa took a break from the Philippine music scene in August 2003 to attend to the treatment of her father who was exposed to lethal levels of carbon monoxide. She obtained an associate degree in nursing and graduated summa cum laude from the Northern Virginia Community College, Washington, D.C. in 2018, followed by a bachelor's degree in nursing from Grand Canyon University in 2020. Presently, she is an operating room (OR) registered nurse based in the United States.

== Discography ==
=== Studio albums ===
Title	Album details	Certification / Sales	Ref.
Simple Lang Ang Buhay / Better Days	Released: 1989; Label: Ivory Records; Format: cassette		
Carol	Released: 1997; Label: Star Music; Format: CD, cassette, digital download	Gold	
Carol: Repackaged	Released: 2000; Label: Star Music; Format: CD, cassette; Track listing: 1. "Iingatan Ka"; 2. "Saan Ka Man Naroroon"; 3. "Only World"; 4. "Bakit 'Di Totohanin"; 5. "Kailan Nga Ba"; 6. "Till It's Time"; 7. "With This Song"; 8. "Wait and Understand"; 9. "Kanino Ba"; 10. "'Pag Puso'y Nakialam"; 11. "What Life Is All About"; 12. "Sana'y 'Di Ko Na Nakita"; 13. "I'll Be There"	PARI: 3× Platinum	
Transition	Released: 2001; Label: Star Music; Format: CD, cassette	PARI: Platinum	
Follow Your Heart	Released: 2003; Label: Star Music; Format: CD, cassette	PARI: Platinum	
My Music, My Life	Released: November 14, 2010; Label: Star Music/Black Bird Music; Format: CD, digital download		

=== Other appearances ===
==== Compilation appearances ====
Title	Details	Ref.
Sa Araw ng Pasko	Released: 1998; Label: Star Music; Singles: 1. "Soon It's Christmas"	
Anak	Released: 2000; Label: Star Music; Singles: 1. "Awit Kay Inay"	
Tanging Yaman (Inspirational album)	Released: 2000; Label: Star Music; Singles: 1. "Iingatan Ka"	
Only Selfless Love	Released: 2002; Label: Star Music; Singles: 1. "We Are One"	
Mysteria Lucis: Mysteries of Light	Released: 2003; Label: Star Music; Singles: 1. "Awit sa Ina ng Santo Rosaryo"	
The Brightest Stars of Christmas	Released: 2003; Label: Star Music; Singles: 1. "Nakaraang Pasko"	

== Filmography ==
=== Television ===
Year	Title	Role	Notes	Ref.
1994	Ang TV	Herself		
1995–2003	ASAP	Herself / Performer / Co-host	Later became a guest performer in 2006 and again in 2010.	
1996	Calvento Files	Rosalie	Episode: "Rosalie"	
1996	Calvento Files	Cindy	Episode: "33 Feet Under"	
1997	Kaybol: Ang Bagong TV	Herself		
2000	Tabing Ilog	Andoy		
2001	Sa Dulo ng Walang Hanggan	Minerva		
2002	Bituin	Melody Sandoval		
2002	Wansapanataym		Episode: "Rapunzel"	
2006	American Idol	Herself	Auditioned for the 5th season.	
2006	Wowowee	Herself, Guest		
2006	Little Big Star	Herself, Guest		
2010	Music Uplate Live	Herself, Performer, Guest		

=== Film ===
Year	Title	Role	Notes	Ref.
1996	Ang TV The Movie: The Adarna Adventure	King's niece		
1997	Calvento Files: The Movie	Cindy		
1998	Nagbibinata	Carol		
1998	Hiling	Rowena		
2000	Tanging Yaman	Chona		

=== Theater ===
Year	Title	Role	Notes	Ref.
2000	Little Mermaid	Jewel		

== Awards and nominations ==
Name of the award ceremony, year presented, type of award, category of the award, nominee of the award, and the result of the nomination
Award ceremony	Year	Category	Work	Result	Ref.
Metropop Song Festival	1998	—	—	3	
Munting Mutya	1998	—	—	Finalist	
Shanghai Song Festival	1999	Asia New Singer Competition	—	Silver	
	1999	Gold Record Award	Carol	—N/a	
5th Katha Music Awards	1999	Best Pop Female Vocal Performance	—	Won	
Awit Awards	2001	Record of the Year	"Iingatan Ka" (from Tanging Yaman – Inspirational Album)	Won	
	2001	Platinum Award	Carol	Won	
Asian Songfest	2001	Special citation	Philippines representative	—N/a	
People's Choice Awards	2001	—	Most Promising Host Entertainer Awardee	—N/a	
	2002	Gold Record Award	Transition	Won	
	2002	Multi-Platinum Status	Carol	Won	
New York Music Festival	2003	Special Award	—	Won	
	2003	Gold certification	Follow Your Heart	Won	
	2003	Platinum Record Award	Transition	Won	
Awit Awards	2003	Best Pop Female Vocal Performance	"Stay"	—N/a	
MTV Pilipinas Awards	2003	Favorite Female Artist	—	Won	
-	2004	Platinum Record Award	Follow Your Heart	Won	
Awit Awards	2004	—	"Awit sa Ina ng Santo Rosaryo"	Nominated	
3rd Star Awards	2011	Female Pop Artist Of The Year	—	Nominated	
ASAP Pop Viewers Choice	2011	Pop Movie Themesong	—	Won	
