= Carol (Carol Banawa album) =

Studio album by Carol Banawa
- Released: 1997
- Genre: Pop
- Label: Star Music

Carol Banawa chronology
Carol (1997)	Carol: Repackaged (2000)

Carol is the debut album by Carol Banawa, released in 1997. In 2000, a re-packaged version was released under Star Music, a recording company owned by ABS-CBN Corporation, with three additional tracks.

Carol contains mainly ballads. The album reflects so much of her character—a typical teenager slowly learning the many ways of the world.

== Track listing ==
=== Original release ===
1. "Bakit 'Di Totohanin" (official theme song of the 2001 film of the same title starring Judy Ann Santos and Piolo Pascual)
2. "Kailan Nga Ba"
3. "Till It's Time"
4. "With This Song"
5. "Wait and Understand"
6. "Kanino Ba"
7. "'Pag Puso'y Nakialam"
8. "What Life Is All About"
9. "Sana'y 'Di Ko Na Nakita"
10. "I'll Be There"

=== Repackaged version ===
1. "Iingatan Ka"
2. "Saan Ka Man Naroroon"
3. "Only World"
4. "Bakit 'Di Totohanin"
5. "Kailan Nga Ba"
6. "Till It's Time"
7. "With This Song"
8. "Wait and Understand"
9. "Kanino Ba"
10. "'Pag Puso'y Nakialam"
11. "What Life Is All About"
12. "Sana'y 'Di Ko Na Nakita"
13. "I'll Be There"
