= List of best-selling albums in the Philippines =

This is a list of best-selling albums in the Philippines. This list can contain any types of albums, including studio albums or extended plays, live albums, greatest hits or compilations, various artists, and soundtracks, both from domestic and international artists. The Philippine Association of the Record Industry (PARI) is the organization responsible for awarding record certifications in the Philippines. PARI is a member of the International Federation of the Phonographic Industry (IFPI). Album certifications include both physical and digital sales.

Prior to 1990, Music certifications were only awarded by Record Labels to their artists through their own guidelines until PARI took the obligation and changed the criteria for album certifications over the years using the guidelines of International Federation of the Phonographic Industry (IFPI). At that time, PARI's early policy for albums released in the country can only be certified Platinum if it were sold at least 40,000 copies, eventually it would be certified with a Diamond record upon reaching ten times copies amounting to 400,000 units. This rule was granted until 2006 when PARI changed it down to 30,000 units. It was not until October 2007 that thresholds for albums were distinguished between the local and international repertoire. In local release, PARI made it into 30,000 copies for Platinum certification, same that of the previous rule, but parted away from the international release, and decreased it into 20,000 copies. In February 2008, PARI decided to change the guidelines again. This time, they made 25,000 copies for local albums and 15,000 for international albums. This latter did not take effect until December 2009 when PARI decreased to 20,000 copies while still remained 15,000 copies for international-released albums, same from the previous one for Platinum-certified album.

Currently, domestic repertoire shares the same thresholds along with the international repertoire, same that of the 1999—2006/2007 rule. For the album to be considered as one of the best-selling albums, new criteria was implemented that the figure must be published by a reliable or acceptable source and that the album must have sold at least 150,000 units for both domestic and international albums to receive Diamond record certification in the country and this was implemented in March 2012 and onwards. This is why only partial sales figures for international albums such as Fearless, Doo-Wops & Hooligans, All Saints, and The Fame have been included on this list. Mandy Moore's self-titled second album had sold 200,000 copies in the Philippines, making it the second best-selling album in the Philippines by a female foreign singer behind Alanis Morissette's Jagged Little Pill.

As of 2025, Jose Mari Chan's Constant Change (1989) and as of 2009 Christmas in Our Hearts (1990) still remain as the best-selling albums in the country with the estimated sales of more than 800,000 copies each. Regine Velasquez is considered as the best-selling artist of all time in the Philippines with 7 million certified albums locally and 1.5 million certified albums in Asia. Other artists such as Eraserheads, Gary Valenciano and Rivermaya have three albums on the list, while Sarah Geronimo, Jaya, Jolina Magdangal, MYMP, Smokey Mountain and Westlife each have two.

== Best-selling albums ==
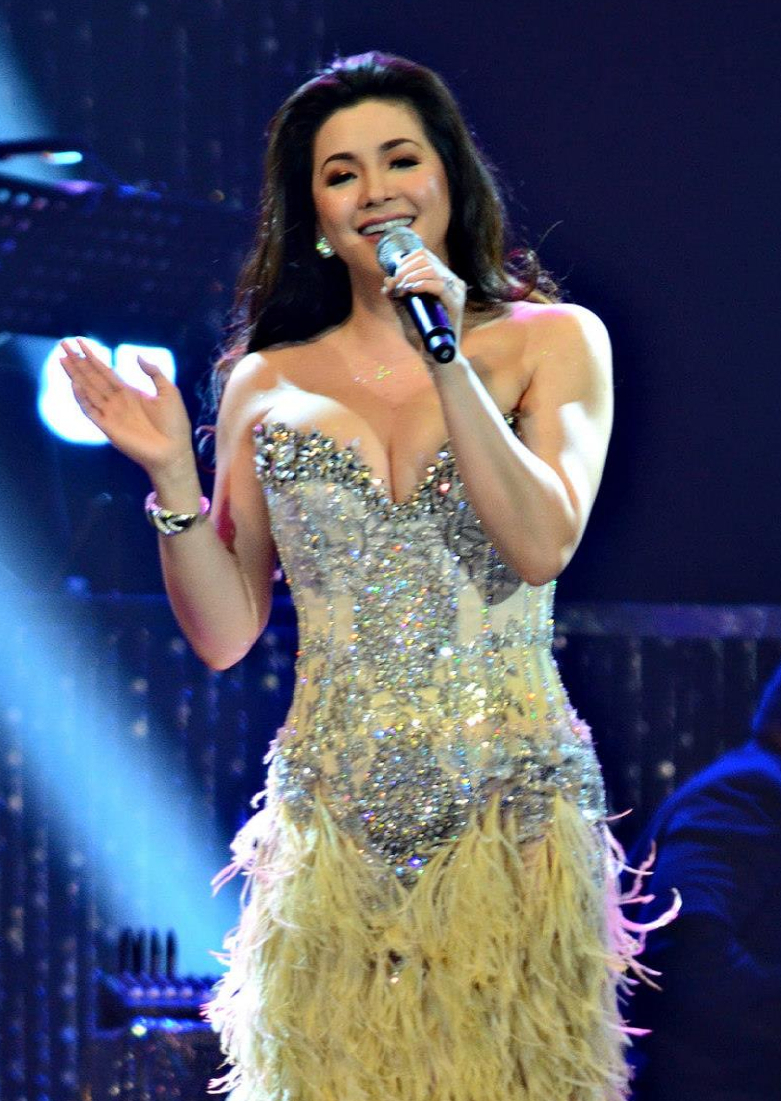
Regine Velasquez has sold more than 8.5 million certified albums regionally making her the Philippines' best-selling artist of all time.

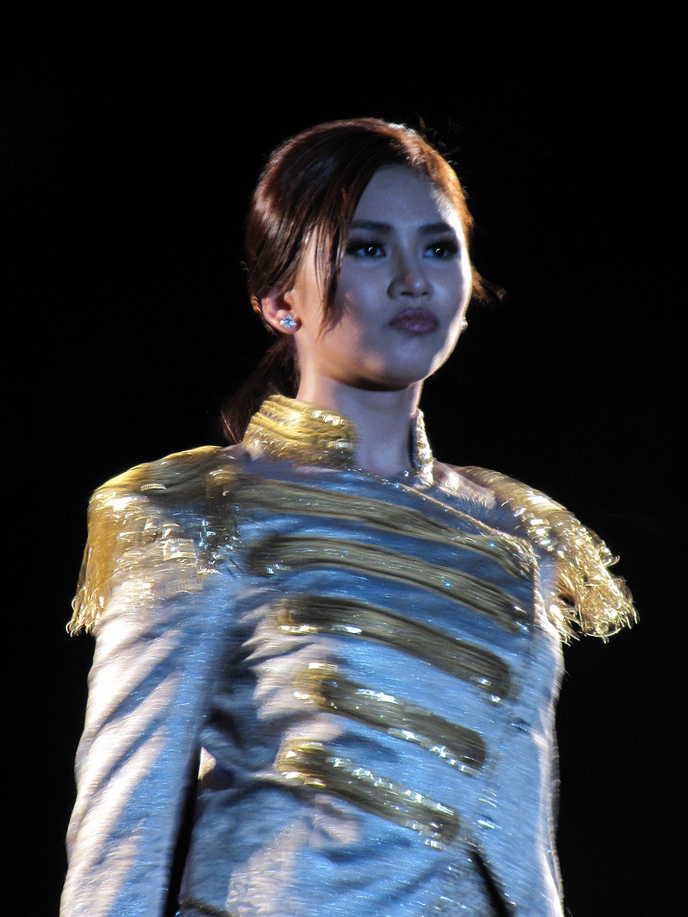
Sarah Geronimo holds the record for best-selling debut album of all time in the Philippines with Popstar: A Dream Come True, which also holds the record as the longest-running number-one album.

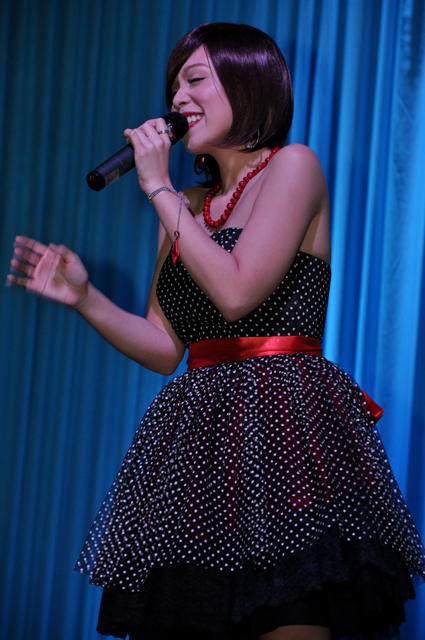
Nina holds the record for best-selling live album with Nina Live!, which received a Diamond certification.

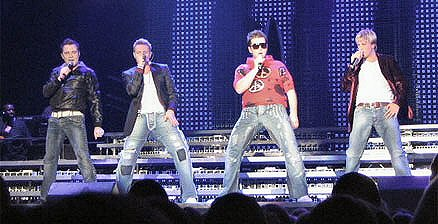
Irish boy band Westlife are the only one of the international acts who had two consecutive released albums featured on the entry.

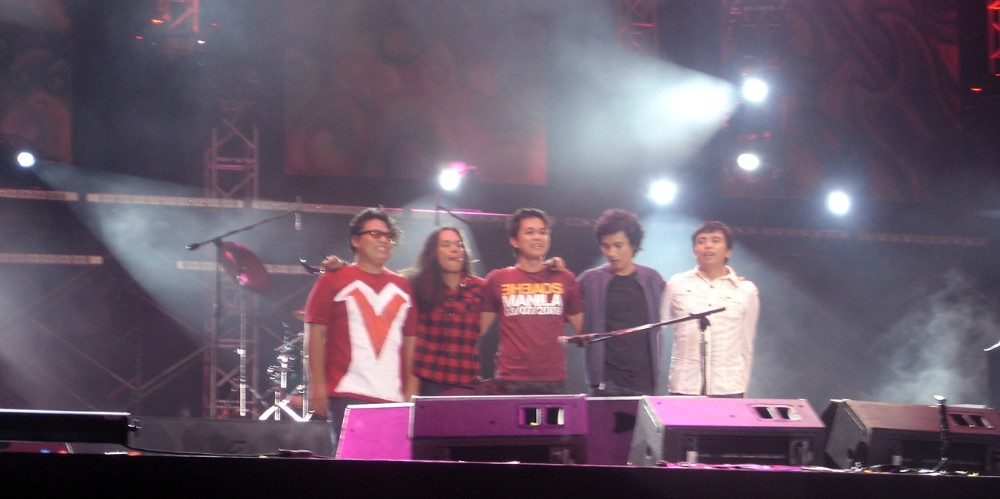
The 2004 greatest hits album of Eraserheads, The Eraserheads Anthology is the best-selling compilation album in the Philippines to date.

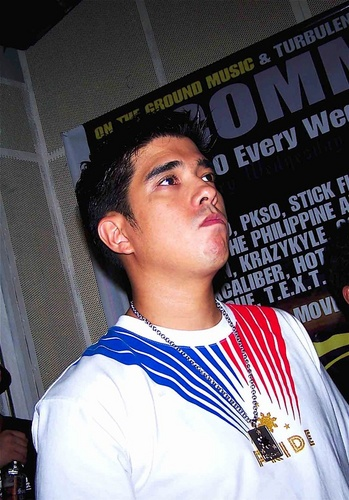
Francis Magalona is the only OPM hip-hop/rapper artist who has a best-selling album in these entries.

Legend
pink	Released before PARI began awarding certifications
grey	Released since PARI began awarding certifications

Best-selling albums in the Philippines
Album	Artist	Release Year	Sales	Certification	Ref.
Christmas in Our Hearts	Jose Mari Chan	1990	802,000	Diamond	
Constant Change (Note: Although Constant Change was released on May 25, 1989, the album had received its certification by PARI on November 10, 1990.)	Jose Mari Chan	1989	801,000	Diamond	
Westlife	Westlife	1999	500,000		
R2K	Regine Velasquez	1999	500,000	Diamond	
Nasaan ang Liwanag	Willy Garte	1992	500,000	Diamond	
Cutterpillow	Eraserheads	1995	400,000		
Jaya	Jaya	1996	360,000		
Popstar: A Dream Come True	Sarah Geronimo	2003	310,000	10× Platinum	
On Memory Lane	Jolina Magdangal	2000	240,000	6× Platinum	
Nina Live!	Nina	2005	300,000	Diamond	
Doo-Wops & Hooligans	Bruno Mars	2010	300,000	2× Diamond	
Coast to Coast	Westlife	2000	280,000		
Jolina	Jolina Magdangal	1999	280,000	7× Platinum	
Forevermore	Side A	1995	265,000		
Paraiso	Smokey Mountain	1991	260,000		
Isn't It Romantic?	Sharon Cuneta	2006	250,000	Diamond	
Smokey Mountain	Smokey Mountain	1989	245,000		
Covers, Vol. 1	Regine Velasquez	2004	240,000		
On Memory Lane	Jolina Magdangal	2000	240,000	6× Platinum	
Jagged Little Pill	Alanis Morissette	1995	240,000		
Paint My Love	Michael Learns to Rock	1996	240,000		
Titanic	James Horner	1997	230,000		
Halik	Aegis	1998	226,000	4× Platinum	
Ten Years Together	APO Hiking Society	1980	224,000		
Just Can't Help Feelin'	Jessa Zaragoza	1997	223,000		
Pagdating ng Panahon	Aiza Seguerra	2001	220,000	5× Platinum	
Habang May Buhay	Donna Cruz	1995	210,000		
Freeman	Francis Magalona	1995	219,000		
Rivermaya	Rivermaya	1994	217,000		
Atomic Bomb	Rivermaya	1997	216,000		
Kitchie Nadal	Kitchie Nadal	2004	215,000	2× Platinum	
Circus	Eraserheads	1994	214,000		
Trip	Rivermaya	1996	214,000		
Versions / Beyond Acoustic (Note: Two albums of MYMP, Versions and Beyond Acoustics were combined together for certification since they were both released consecutively on a same year.)	MYMP	2005	211,000		
Eraserheads Anthology	Eraserheads	2004	209,000		
Greatest Hits	Gary Valenciano	1997	200,000	4× Platinum	
A Wonderful Christmas	Christian Bautista	2010	200,000	Diamond	
Mandy Moore	Mandy Moore	2001	200,000		
Shout for Joy	Gary Valenciano	1992	200,000	5× Platinum	
Regine Live: Songbird Sings the Classics	Regine Velasquez	2000	200,000	Platinum	
...Baby One More Time	Britney Spears	1999	200,000	4× Platinum	
In The Raw	Jaya	1997	200,000		
Postcards from Heaven	Lighthouse Family	1997	200,000		
Chapter I: A New Beginning	The Moffatts	1998	200,000		
Spice	Spice Girls	1996	200,000		
Nina	Nina	2006	188,000	2× Platinum	(Note: Nina (standard and reissued versions) has sold over 60,000 physical copies as of 2007 and has accumulated 159,790,082 streaming count (127,832 album-equivalent units) on Spotify as of September 13, 2025. This excludes figures from Apple Music, YouTube and other streaming channels.)
Kailangan Ko'y Ikaw	Regine Velasquez	2000	180,000	2× Platinum	
Revive	Gary Valenciano	2000	180,000	6× Platinum	
Nagmamahal Kapamilya (Songs For Global Pinoys)	Various Artist	2007	180,000	6× Platinum	
Heaven	Nina	2002	162,000	2× Platinum	(Note: Heaven has sold over 80,000 copies as of 2003 and has accumulated 102,449,004 streaming count (81,959 album-equivalent units) on Spotify as of September 13, 2025. This excludes figures from Apple Music, YouTube and other streaming channels.)
Forever	Martin Nievera	1998	160,000	4× Platinum	
Zsa Zsa	Zsa Zsa Padilla	1998	160,000	4× Platinum	
Retro	Regine Velasquez	1996	160,000		
Araw Oras Tagpuan	Sponge Cola	2011	150,000	Diamond	
Julie Anne San Jose	Julie Anne San Jose	2012	150,000	Diamond	
Wish I May	Alden Richards	2015	150,000	Diamond	
All Saints	All Saints	1997	140,000		
Fearless	Taylor Swift	2008	140,000		
Nandito Ako	Thalía	1997	120,000		

== See also ==
- Music in the Philippines
- Philippine Association of the Record Industry (PARI)
- List of best-selling albums: by country, or worldwide
