= A Wish Comes True =

Studio album by Jolina Magdangal
- Released: 1996
- Recorded: 1996
- Studio: Pink Noise Recording Studio
- Genre: Pop
- Length: 42 minutes
- Language: English; Tagalog
- Label: Walt Disney; Universal
- Producer: Bella D. Tan (executive); Ito Rapadas

Jolina Magdangal chronology
A Wish Comes True (1996)	Jolina (1999)

Singles from A Wish Comes True
- 1. "Sana" Released: 1996

A Wish Comes True is the Jolina Magdangal's debut studio album, released in the Philippines in 1996, by Walt Disney Records and distributed in the Philippines by Universal Records.

Magdangal was the first Filipino recording artist of Walt Disney in the Philippines.

== Track listing ==
All tracks were produced by Ito Rapadas.

A Wish Comes True track listing
No.	Title	Writer(s)	Length
1.	"Kung Masasabi Ko Lang"	Jade Nicdao	4:20
2.	"Sana"	Florante de Leon	4:02
3.	"Where Are You"	Ben M. Escasa; Deng Escasa	4:42
4.	"Super Typhoon"	Brando G. Juan	3:39
5.	"Kung Ikaw Lang Sana"	Jimmy Borja	3:50
6.	"Count the Stars"	Trina Belamide	3:12
7.	"I'll Never Let You Down"	Mario Lajarca	3:46
8.	"This Morning on the Radio"	Escasa; Borja	4:43
9.	"Kung Iibigin Kita"	Tata Betita	4:39
10.	"When You Dance with Me"	Escasa; Borja	4:28
Total length:			42:00

== Personnel ==
Adapted from the A Wish Comes True liner notes.

- Bella D. Tan – executive producer
- Ito Rapadas – producer
- Henry Garcia – arranger (tracks 2, 5)
- Albert Tamayo – arranger (tracks 6, 7, 9)
- Alvin Nunez – arranger (tracks 1, 3, 8, 10)
- Frederick Garcia – arranger (track 6)
- Erwin dela Cruz – arranger (track 4)
- Babsie Molina – back-up vocals
- Moy Ortiz – back-up vocals
- Katherine Molina – back-up vocals
- Sylvia Macaraeg – back-up vocals
- Elize Cortez – back-up vocals (tracks 4, 5)
- Abe Hipolito – guitars
- Boyet Navajas – guitars (tracks 4, 6)
- Jerry Joanino – mixing engineer (Pink Noise Recording Studio)
- Raymund Isaac – photography
- Joanne Pe – album cover design
