= Follow Your Heart (company) =

American vegan food company

- Industry: Vegetarian and Vegan Food
- Predecessor: Johnny Weissmuller’s American Natural Foods
- Founded: 1970; 56 years ago
- Founders: Michael Besançon, Bob Goldberg, Paul Lewin, and Spencer Windbiel
- Headquarters: Canoga Park, California
- Products: Vegenaise
- Parent: Danone
- Website: followyourheart.com

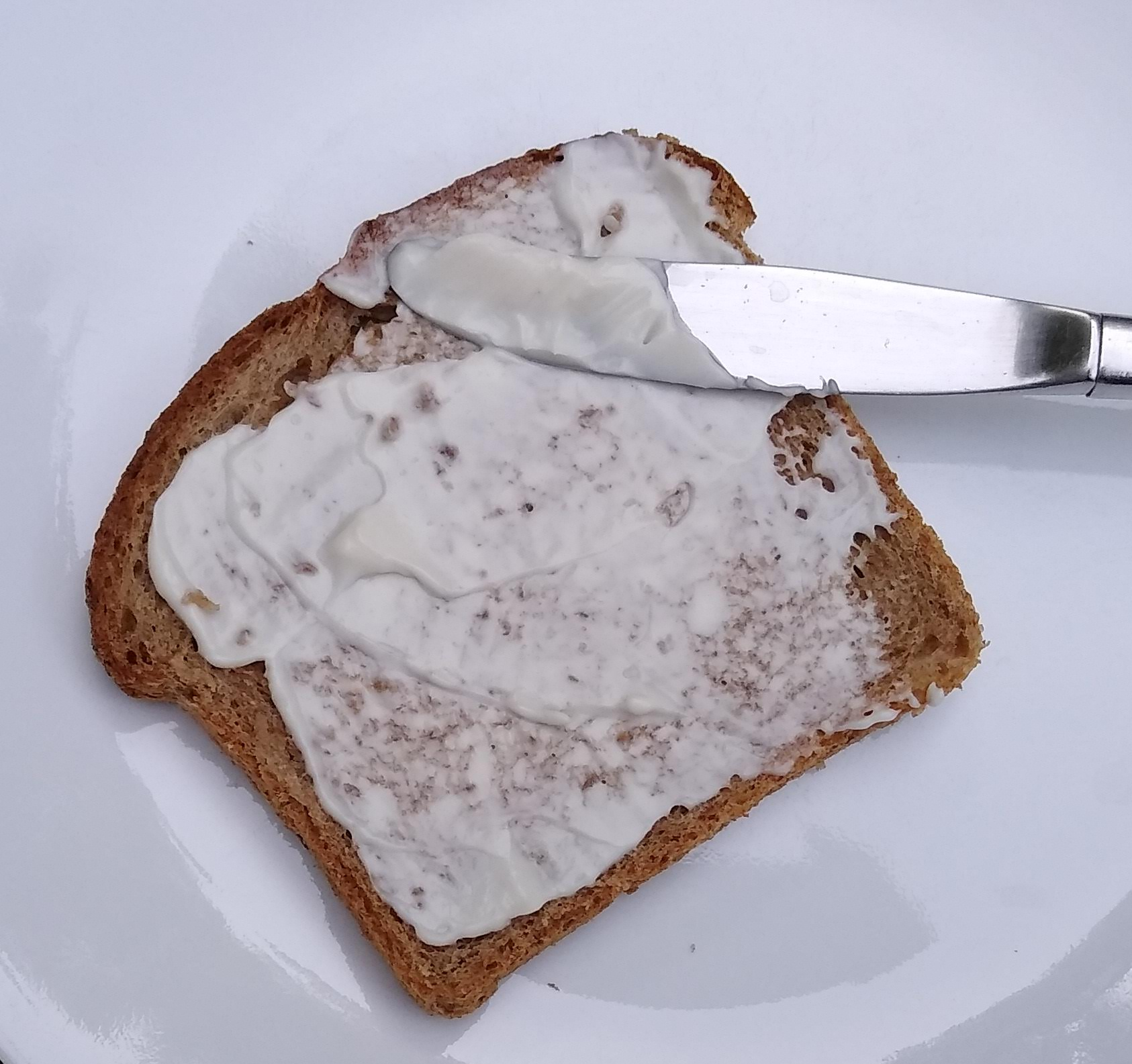
Vegenaise on bread

Follow Your Heart is a vegan and vegetarian food company that began in 1970 as a restaurant in Canoga Park, California. In 1977, they began selling Vegenaise, an egg-free mayonnaise substitute whose name is a portmanteau of vegetarian and mayonnaise. The company now also produces other lines of vegan food, such as vegan cheeses, salad dressings, and VeganEgg.

== History ==
The company began as a sandwich counter in the back of a market called Johnny Weissmuller's American Natural Foods in Canoga Park. In 1994 the restaurant and store suffered serious damage in the Los Angeles earthquake, but remained in business.

== Food lines ==
The company developed a line of its own vegetarian food. One of its first successes was Vegenaise, which became the best-selling vegan mayonnaise replacement in the US, invented by co-founder Bob Goldberg. Up to fifty million gallons of it are produced annually, and the product is also sold in various alternate forms, including soy-free (where the soy is replaced with pea protein powder). They developed a line of deli products, first available commercially in 1988 after a local grocer asked the restaurant to begin packaging its tofu salads for them to put out for sale, focused on plant-based replacements for more traditional non-vegan foods such as sliced cheese replacements mirroring the flavors of various types of cheese. Its products are sold in 23 countries, with a turnover of about $50 million in revenues per year.

In 2015, Follow Your Heart was named the company of the year by PETA. That year the company also partnered with musician Lil B to produce an app of Follow Your Heart-inspired emojis; the company's mascot is itself named VegEmoji.

In February 2021, Follow Your Heart was acquired by the European food company, Danone.
