= Jolina Sings the Masters =

Studio album by Jolina Magdangal
- Released: 15 August 2002
- Genre: Ballad, Pop
- Length: 62 minutes
- Language: English, Tagalog
- Label: Star Music
- Producer: Vehnee Saturno; Trina Belamide; Andre Dionisio; Danny S. Tan; Freddie A. Saturno

Jolina Magdangal chronology
On Memory Lane (2000)	Jolina Sings the Masters (2002)	Forever Jolina (2004)

Singles from Jolina Sings the Masters
- 1. "Kahit Di Mo Pansin"; 2. "Million Miles Away"

Jolina Sings the Masters is the fourth studio album by Filipino singer-actress Jolina Magdangal released by Star Music on August 15, 2002. The album consists of 15 songs mostly ballads, with some come with a light pop lilt. The album's title refers to the songwriters who contributed songs to the collection, whose works have become contemporary classics in Philippine music industry earning them the right to be referred to as masters. The album took eight months to finish due to Magdangal's concert tours around the Philippines and in major cities around the world.

The album showcased the transition of Magdangal from a youth kiddie pop to a grown-up artist, getting rid of the colorful wardrobe, hair ribbons and her trademark bangs and exploring adult emotions in the songs.

The first single released from the album was "Kahit Di Mo Pansin", composed by Vehnee Saturno. Other notable pieces include her covers of "Million Miles Away", which she performed live in the 2003 Asian Television Awards; "Kahit Ika'y Panaginip Lang", which was used in her television series Kahit Kailan; "How Will I Know", which was personally written by David Pomeranz for her; and "No Letting Go", which she and composer Trina Belaminde collaborated in the song's concept.

== Critical reception ==
The album was praised for its repertoire particularly on putting up together master composers in a single album, making it the first album to do such.

== Commercial performance ==
The album was awarded with a gold record certification from the Philippine Association of the Record Industry (PARI).

== Track listing ==
No.	Title	Writer(s)	Producer	Length
1.	"Million Miles Away"	Robert More	Vehnee Saturno	4:05
2.	"Kahit Di Mo Pansin"	Vehnee Saturno	Vehnee Saturno	3:37
3.	"No Letting Go"	Trina Belaminde	Trina Belamide	4:00
4.	"Langit Ang Ibigin Ka"	Vehnee Saturno	Vehnee Saturno	4:48
5.	"Ako'y Umiibig"	Vehnee Saturno	Vehnee Saturno	4:16
6.	"Bulong-Bulungan"	Freddie Aguilar	Vehnee Saturno	4:31
7.	"Iyong-Iyo Pa Rin"	Willy Cruz	Andre Dionisio	3:54
8.	"What Is A Sweetheart"	Jose Mari Chan	Andrei Dionisio	3:09
9.	"Kahit Ika'y Panaginip Lang"	Ryan Cayabyab	Vehnee Saturno	4:33
10.	"Teach Me To Fly"	David Pomeranz	Vehnee Saturno	4:34
11.	"Paano Kita Mapapasalamatan"	George Canseco	Vehnee Saturno	3:50
12.	"How Will I Know"	David Pomeranz and Kathie Lee Gifford	Vehnee Saturno	4:20
13.	"Sana'y Maghintay Ang Walang Hanggan"	Willy Cruz	Vehnee Saturno	4:43
14.	"Ang Tangi Kong Minahal"	Danny S. Tan	Danny S. Tan	3:47
15.	"Higit Ba Siya Sa Akin"	Freddie A. Saturno	Freddie A. Saturno	3:50
Total length:				62:00

== Personnel ==
Adapted from the Jolina Sings the Masters liner notes.

- Vilma B. Selga & Charo Santos-Concio – executive producers
- Andrei Dionisio – a&r supervision
- Beth Faustino & Mona Quejano – a&r coordinators
- Jolina Magdangal & Jun Magdangal – album cover concept
- Raymund del Rosario – album packaging concert & art director
- Ferdinand Abuel & Redel Dapul – creative coordinators
- Tom Epperson – photography
- Jenni Epperson – styling
- Jing Monis & Krist Bansuelo – make-up
- Joel Soriano – cover design & layout
