= Forever Jolina =

Studio album by Jolina Magdangal
- Released: January 2004
- Genre: Pop
- Length: 51 minutes
- Languages: English, Tagalog
- Label: GMA Records
- Producers: Kedy Sanchez; Gerdie Francisco & Mike Jamir

Jolina Magdangal chronology
Jolina Sings the Masters (2002)	Forever Jolina (2004)	Tuloy Pa Rin Ang Awit (2006)

Singles from Forever Jolina
- 1. "Bahala Na"

Forever is the fifth studio album by Filipino singer-actress Jolina Magdangal released by GMA Records in January 2004. The lead single "Bahala Na" was certified Gold by Philippine Association of the Record Industry for selling over 75,000 units in the country.

== Track listing ==
No.	Title	Writer(s)	Producer	Length
1.	"Forever Be"	Melvin Morallos	Kedy Sanchez	4:20
2.	"Sayang"	Toto Sorioso	Kedy Sanchez	4:00
3.	"Parang Baliw"	Kedy Sanchez & John Marin Flores	Kedy Sanchez	4:52
4.	"Kung Kailan Wala Ka Na"	Soc Villanueva & Arnel de Pano	Kedy Sanchez	4:36
5.	"Bahala Na"	Toto Sorioso	Kedy Sanchez	4:14
6.	"You Don't Have to Say You Love Me"	Donaggio-Pallavicini-V. Wickham-S. Napier-Bell	Kedy Sanchez	4:25
7.	"Narito (Ang Puso Ko)"	Maya Meriales-Manzano & Gary Valenciano	Gerdie Francisco & Mike Jamir	4:16
8.	"All My Life"	Ferdie Dimadura	Kedy Sanchez	3:14
9.	"Una't Nag-iisang Mahal"	Trina Belamide	Kedy Sanchez	3:31
10.	"Txt Me "I Luv U""	Mandy Araneta and Allan Chu Jr.	Kedy Sanchez	4:04
11.	"Kahit Kailan"	Jay Durias	Kedy Sanchez	5:37
12.	"Happy Ending"	Kedy Sanchez	Kedy Sanchez
Total length:				51:00

== Personnel ==
Adapted from the Forever Jolina liner notes.

- Buddy Medina – executive producer
- Kedy Sanchez – producer, vocal arranger
- Gerdie Francisco & Mike Jamir – producer for the track "Narito (Ang Puso Ko)"
- Nikki Cunanan – recording engineer
- Jeffrey Felix – recording engineer
- Don Manalang – recording engineer
- Ramil Bahadi – recording engineer
- Agatha Obar – vocal supervision
- Melvin Morallos – vocal arranger
- Ida Ramos-Henares – album design
- Joni & Geraldine Raso – digital imaging
- Jason Tablante – photography
- Nemi Rafanan – hair & make-up
- Mervin Lazaro – wardrobe

== Awards ==
- Gold Record Award; Favorite Female Artist (2004 MTV Pilipinas Music Awards)

== Certifications ==
Region	Certification	Certified units/sales
Philippines PARI	Platinum	40,000

== See also ==
- GMA Records
- GMA Network
