= Destiny (Jolina Magdangal album) =

Studio album by Jolina Magdangal
- Released: July 2008
- Genre: Pop, Soft rock
- Length: 40 minutes
- Language: English, Tagalog
- Label: GMA Records
- Producer: Alwyn B. Cruz; Marc Tupaz

Jolina Magdangal chronology
Tuloy Pa Rin Ang Awit (2006)	Destiny (2008)	Back to Love (2015)

Singles from Destiny
- 1. "Will of the Wind"; 2. "Hanggang Kailan"

Destiny is the seventh studio album by Filipina singer-actress Jolina Magdangal under GMA Records. "Will of the Wind" is the lead single and used as the main theme song of the movie I.T.A.L.Y.(I trust and love you). Other songs from this album was also used as a theme song to some of GMA Network TV series like Filipino adaptation of koreanovela All about Eve and koreanovela The Legend. A cover of Fra Lippo Lippi (band)'s Stitches & Burns is also included in this album.

== Track listing ==
No.	Title	Writer(s)	Producer	Length
1.	"Will of the Wind"	Greg W. Barnhill and James Photoglo	Alwyn B. Cruz	4:11
2.	"Pangako Ng Puso"	Agatha Obar	Alwyn B. Cruz	3:46
3.	"Umibig Ka"	Erik Vargas	Mark Tupaz	4:48
4.	"When I Close My Eyes"	Agatha Obar	Alwyn B. Cruz	3:49
5.	"Isang Taon"	Erik Vargas	Mark Tupaz	3:30
6.	"Hanggang Kailan"	Agatha Obar	Alwyn B. Cruz	3:57
7.	"Tuwing Kasama Kita"	Agatha Obar	Alwyn B. Cruz	3:46
8.	"When I Fall in Love"	Victor Young and Heyman Edward	Alwyn B. Cruz	3:16
9.	"Stitches & Burns"	Fra Lippo Lippi	Alwyn B. Cruz	3:45
10.	"Buksan Ang 'Yong Puso"	Agatha Obar	Alwyn B. Cruz	4:54
Total length:				40:00

== Personnel ==
Adapted from the Jolina liner notes.

- Felipe S. Yalong – executive producer
- Rene A. Salta – executive producer
- Alwyn B. Cruz – producer
- Marc Tupaz – producer
- Shamrock – arrangement and performance for the songs "Umibig Ka" and "Isang Taon"
- Christopher San Diego – recording and mixing engineer, gma network recording studios
- Arnold Jallores – recording and mixing engineer, Mixsonic recording studios
- Jun Magdangal – album cover concept
- Joseph De Vera – album cover concept, album cover design
- Eileen Ramos – make-up
- Reggie Cruz – stylist
- Dominique James – photographer, great image (front cover)
- Dail Deri – photographer, gallery d (inside & back cover)
