= Follow Your Heart (Carol Banawa album) =

Studio album by Carol Banawa
- Released: 2003
- Label: Star

Follow Your Heart is an album released by Filipino singer and actress Carol Banawa in 2003.

The album features several cover songs such as "Heaven Knows" (Rick Price), "Ocean Deep" (Cliff Richard) and "Get Here" (Oleta Adams).

== Track listing ==
1. "Noon at Ngayon"
2. "Ocean Deep"
3. "Get Here" (with Juddha Paolo)
4. "Together Forever" (with RJ Rosales)
5. "Langit Na Bituin"
6. "Heaven Knows"
7. "Hanggang May Kailanman"
8. "Ikaw Lamang"
9. "Dito Ka sa Piling Ko"
10. "If I Believed"
11. "Stay with Me"
12. "Ang Kulang Na Lang"
13. "All the Years"
