= Jolina =

Studio album by Jolina Magdangal
- Released: January 9, 1999
- Genre: Pop
- Length: 43 minutes
- Languages: English, Tagalog
- Label: Star Music
- Producers: Freddie A. Saturno; Vehnee Saturno; Larry Hermoso

Jolina Magdangal chronology
| A Wish Comes True (1996) | Jolina (1999) | On Memory Lane (2000) |

Singles from Jolina
- 1. "Laging Tapat"; 2. "Paper Roses"

Jolina is the second studio album by Filipino singer and actress Jolina Magdangal released by Star Music on January 9, 1999. The album consists mostly of passionate, easy-listening love songs, a style of music quite popular in the Philippines. Five of the tracks on the album were originally used as soundtrack in various movies she starred to which include "Tameme" and "Sana'y Kapiling Ka" in the film F.L.A.M.E.S.: The Movie (1997), the re-recorded "T.L. Ako Sa'yo" and her cover of "Tulak Ng Bibig, Kabig Ng Dibdib" in Kung Ayaw Mo, Huwag Mo! (1998), and "Kapag Ako Ay Nagmahal" in Labs Kita... Okey Ka Lang? (1998). The only American song remake in the album is the studio recording of Anita Bryant-original "Paper Roses" which Magdangal sung on a drama anthology television program, Maalaala Mo Kaya.

The opening song "Laging Tapat" was the first single released from the album which remained in the list of top radio charts nationwide for over 10 weeks. The follow-up single was her version of "Paper Roses", which became an instant favorite in the Philippines.

On October 1, 1999, the album was awarded with a 4× platinum certification by the Philippine Association of the Record Industry (PARI) and was officially declared by PARI as the biggest commercial success and the biggest seller of the year 1999 in the Philippines. Eventually, it was certified with a 7× platinum for achieving more than 280,000+ units sales and became one of the best selling albums of all time in the Philippines.

== Critical reception ==
The album received mixed reviews from music critics with David Gozales of allmusic.com saying "the music is mostly easy-listening... it tends to be a bit boring". Gonzales, however, praised Magdangal's singing by saying "though the pieces are not very challenging, there is an appealing ring to a good portion of the music, made more palatable by Magdangal's poise and assured delivery". He then continued praising a selection of tracks, saying "Paper Roses... is the best song on the album... "Laping Tapat" has a penetrating melody impassioned by the vocalist's effort. "Kapag Ako'y Nagmahal" is a standout ballad which she also brings to full life. This song is also made distinctive by the trenchant use of a string section."

== Commercial performance ==
Within few days of its release, the album was declared by Tower Records as one of the top five sellers in the Philippines. Jolina remains to be one of the best selling albums of all time in the Philippines with a 7× platinum certification and holds the record as the biggest commercial success of the label Star Music which led to Magdangal being credited as the Queen of Star Music.

== Track listing ==
| No. | Title | Writer(s) | Producer | Length |
|---|---|---|---|---|
| 1. | "Laging Tapat" | Freddie Saturno | Freddie Saturno | 3:33 |
| 2. | "T.L. Ako Sa 'Yo (Re-recorded)" | Snaffu Rigor | Freddie Saturno | 3:51 |
| 3. | "Di Na Magdadalawang Isip" | Jimmy Borja | Freddie Saturno | 4:00 |
| 4. | "Ang Pagibig Ko Na Ayaw Mo" | Jamie Rivera | Freddie Saturno | 3:56 |
| 5. | "Sana'y Kapiling Ka" | Vehnee Saturno | Vehnee Saturno | 3:51 |
| 6. | "Parang Nalimot Mo Na" | Freddie A. Saturno | Freddie Saturno | 3:40 |
| 7. | "Kapag Ako Ay Nagmahal" | Larry Hermoso | Larry Hermoso | 4:19 |
| 8. | "Paper Roses" | Janice Torre / Fred Speilmen | Freddie Saturno | 3:27 |
| 9. | "Tulak Ng Bibig, Kabig Ng Dibdib" | Rodolfo Ongpauco | Freddie Saturno | 3:38 |
| 10. | "Tameme" | Freddie A. Saturno / Enrico Santos | Freddie Saturno | 3:36 |
| 11. | "Think About You" | Lenin de Guzman | Freddie Saturno | 4:30 |
| Total length: | | | | 43:00 |

== Personnel ==
Adapted from the Jolina liner notes.

- Buddy Medina – executive producer
- Freddie A. Saturno – producer
- Vehnee Saturno – producer
- Lary Hermoso – producer
- Rene A. Salta – a&r supervision
- Gerald Portacio – production coordinator
- Matt Rosanes – cover and lay-out design
- Joe Mabalot – photographer
- Efren San Pedro – recording engineer
- Nikki Cunanan – recording engineer
- Dante San Pedro – mixing engineer
- Nikki Cunanan – mixing engineer
- Angee Rozul – mastering engineer
