= Tuloy Pa Rin Ang Awit =

Studio album by Jolina Magdangal
- Released: February 2006
- Genre: Pop
- Length: 48 minutes
- Language: English, Tagalog
- Label: GMA Records
- Producer: Rene Salta; Agatha Obar; Jonathan Ong; Kedy Sanchez; Trina Belamide; Freddie Saturno

Jolina Magdangal chronology
Forever Jolina (2004)	Tuloy Pa Rin Ang Awit (2006)	Destiny (2008)

Singles from Tuloy Pa Rin Ang Awit
- 1. "Maybe It's You"; 2. "Makulay Na Buhay"; 3. "Let Me Be The One"; 4. "Gusto"

Alternative Cover

Tuloy Pa Rin Ang Awit is the sixth studio album by Filipino singer and actress Jolina Magdangal released by GMA Records in February 2006. A Special Edition was released on July of the same year to include a special bonus VCD which contains the music videos of "Makulay Na Buhay", "Let Me Be The One", and performance video and music video of the first single "Maybe It's You".

== Track listing ==
First edition
No.	Title	Writer(s)	Producer	Length
1.	"Maybe It's You (Music Video)"	Agatha Obar	Agatha Obar	4:02
2.	"Tuloy Pa Rin Ang Awit"	Rebel Magdagasang	Rene Salta	4:05
3.	"Always In My Heart"	Agatha Obar	Agatha Obar	3:42
4.	"Maybe It's You"	Agatha Obar	Kedy Sanchez & Agatha Obar	4:02
5.	"Better Off This Way"	Jonathan Ong	Jonathan Ong	3:23
6.	"Akin"	Trina Belamide	Trina Belamide	3:30
7.	"Together Forever"	Stock-Aitken-Waterman	Jonathan Ong	3:32
8.	"Napamahal Ka Na"	Freddie Saturno	Freddie Saturno	3:39
9.	"You Belong To My Heart"	Jonathan Ong	Jonathan Ong	3:32
10.	"Whenever You Call"	Agatha Obar	Agatha Obar & Melvin Morallos	3:29
11.	"Gusto"	Khavn	Rene Salta	3:10
12.	"Let Me Be The One"	Janno Gibbs	Kedy Sanchez	4:02
13.	"Maybe (Solo version)"	Jamie Rivera and Jimmy Antiporda	Kedy Sanchez	5:00
Total length:				45:53

2-Disc Special Edition
No.	Title	Writer(s)	Producer(s)	Length
1.	"Makulay Na Buhay"	Kitchie Nadal		2:47
2.	"Tuloy Pa Rin Ang Awit"	Rebel Magdagasang	Rene Salta	4:05
3.	"Always In My Heart"	Agatha Obar	Agatha Obar	3:42
4.	"Maybe It's You"	Agatha Obar	Kedy Sanchez & Agatha Obar	4:02
5.	"Better Off This Way"	Jonathan Ong	Jonathan Ong	3:23
6.	"Akin"	Trina Belamide	Trina Belamide	3:30
7.	"Together Forever"	Stock-Aitken-Waterman	Jonathan Ong	3:32
8.	"Napamahal Ka Na"	Freddie Saturno	Freddie Saturno	3:39
9.	"You Belong To My Heart"	Jonathan Ong	Jonathan Ong	3:32
10.	"Whenever You Call"	Agatha Obar	Agatha Obar & Melvin Morallos	3:29
11.	"Gusto"	Khavn	Rene Salta	3:10
12.	"Let Me Be The One"	Janno Gibbs	Kedy Sanchez	4:02
13.	"Maybe (Solo version)"	Jamie Rivera and Jimmy Antiporda	Kedy Sanchez	5:00
Total length:				48:00

== Personnel ==
Adapted from the Tuloy Pa Rin Ang Awit liner notes.

- Buddy Medina – executive producer
- Kedy Sanchez – supervising producer
- Rene Salta – in-charge of marketing
- Dominic Benedicto – recording engineer, asiatec pink noise recording studios
- Nikki Cunanan – recording engineer, asiatec pink noise recording studios
- Jonathan Ong – recording engineer, sonic state audio
- Arnold Jallores – recording engineer, mixsonic recording studios
- Eric Apuyan – recording engineer, amerasian studios
- Oyet San Diego – recording engineer, gma network center post prod facilities
- Jolina Magdangal – album concept
- Joseph De Vera – cover design & final artwork
- Jason Tablante – photography
- Jeffrey Rogador – stylist
- Boying Eustaquio – wardrobe
- Jonathan Velasco – make-up

== See also ==
- GMA Records
- GMA Network
