= Back to Love (Jolina Magdangal album) =

Studio album by Jolina Magdangal
- Released: 20 November 2015
- Genre: Pop
- Length: 48 minutes
- Language: English, Tagalog
- Label: Star Music
- Producer: Roque 'Rox' B. Santos

Jolina Magdangal chronology
Destiny (2008)	Back to Love (2015)

Singles from Back to Love
- 1. "Ikaw Ba 'Yon"; 2. "Kaya Mo Pa Ba"

Back to Love is the eighth studio album by Filipino singer-actress Jolina Magdangal originally released by Star Music on 20 November 2015 through digital downloading and streaming containing seven original songs. An expanded edition was released in February 2016, this time both on digital and physical forms. The album serves as Magdangal's comeback album after a seven-year hiatus in the recording industry, as well as a homecoming in Star Music.

Two weeks after its release, it was certified with Gold from the Philippine Association of the Record Industry.

In the 8th PMPC Star Awards for Music, Magdangal won Best Female Recording Artist of the Year and Back To Love was nominated for Album of the Year and Best Album Cover.

== Critical response ==
Back to Love received positive reviews from music critics with Rito P. Asilo of the Philippine Daily Inquirer generally praising the selections and Magdangal's delivery as "love songs that are as emotively arranged as they are lovingly rendered". In particular, Asilo lauds Magdangal's technical singing in the album's carrier single "Ikaw Ba 'Yon" saying "[it] is a love-on-the-rocks ditty that allows [Magdangal] to display her gorgeous notes as she scales the tune’s ascending melody. But, the songstress’ triumph goes beyond technical singing in this particular track, she effectively delineates contrasting emotions that require her to shuttle between 'holding on' and 'letting go'." While in "Kaya Mo Pa Ba", Asilo praised Magdangal's straightforward singing.

== Commercial performance ==
Back to Love received a gold record certification from the Philippine Association of the Record Industry two weeks after its release in physical form.

== Track listing ==
Expanded edition
No.	Title	Writer(s)	Producer	Length
1.	"Sa Panaginip Lang"	David Dimaguila & Roque "Rox" Santos	Roque "Rox" Santos	4:57
2.	"Throwback Lang" (with Kyla)	Jungee Marcelo	Jungee Marcelo	3:56
3.	"Paano Na 'To?"	Nyoy Volante	Roque "Rox" Santos	4:08
4.	"Kaya Mo Pa Ba"	Jamie Rivera	Jamie Rivera	4:23
5.	"Ikaw Ba 'Yon"	Joven Tan	Roque "Rox" Santos	3:23
6.	"Nasaan Na"	Yeng Constantino	Roque "Rox" Santos	3:55
7.	"Still You"	Trina Belamide	Trina Belamide	4:12
8.	"Ganito Pala Ang Pag-Ibig"	Mark Escueta & Jolina Magdangal	Roque "Rox" Santos	4:03
9.	"Kapag Ako Ay Nagmahal" (2015 version)	Larry Hermoso		5:12
10.	"Chuva Choo Choo 2.0" (with Vice Ganda)	Enrico Santos and Vehnee Saturno	Roque "Rox" Santos	3:08
11.	"Kapag Ako Ay Nagmahal" (with Gloc-9)	Larry Hermoso / Rap by Gloc-9	Roque "Rox" Santos, Gloc-9, Kidwolf	6:09
Total length:				48:00

== Personnel ==
Adapted from the Back to Love liner notes.

- Malou N. Santos – executive producer
- Roxy Laquigan – executive producer
- Jonathan Manalo – a&r supervision, audio content head
- Roque "Rox" B. Santos – over-all album producer
- Jayson Sarmiento – promo specialist
- Jholina Luspo – promo associate
- London Angeles – promo coordinator
- Marivic Benedicto – star songs inc. and new media head
- Regie Sandel – sales & distribution
- Beth Faustino – music publishing officer
- Eaizen Almazan – new media technical assistant
- Abbey Aledo – music servicing officer
- Andrew Castillo – creative head
- BJ Pascual – photography
- Qurator – stylist
- Mickey See – make-up
- Jay Wee – hair
- Merlito Pabatao – art direction & design

== Certification ==
Region	Certification	Certified units/sales
Philippines (PARI)	Gold	7,500
^{*} Sales figures based on certification alone.
