= On Memory Lane =

Studio album by Jolina Magdangal
- Released: 23 January 2000
- Genre: Pop
- Length: 54 minutes
- Language: English
- Label: Star Music
- Producer: Vehnee Saturno

Jolina Magdangal chronology
Jolina (1999)	On Memory Lane (2000)	Jolina Sings the Masters (2002)

Singles from On Memory Lane
- 1. "Crying Time"; 2. "Too Young"

On Memory Lane is the third studio album of singer-actress Jolina Magdangal released by Star Music on January 23, 2000. The album consists entirely of remakes of originals from the 1950s and 1960s. All but one song are covers of international tunes, while "Sweet Sixteen" is the only Filipino remake. At the time of its release, remakes of international songs were trendy in the Philippines and other artists also had success with covers. Magdangal joined the bandwagon through this album, but instead of exploring the music mines of the '80s and the '70s as most artists did that time, she traipsed across the '50s and the '60s. In its packaging, not only that she is also costumed and made-up as a World War II beauty on the cover but is also photographed in other period costumes inside the booklet.

The album was awarded 6× platinum certification and became one of the best selling albums of all time in the Philippines.

== Critical reception ==
On Memory Lane received positive reviews with David Gonzales of allmusic.com saying "Despite consisting entirely of remakes, this is an enjoyable album, showcasing Magdangal's impressive development", while the Philippine Star said "On Memory Lane makes for easy and enjoyable listening". Gonzales also praised Magdangal's delivery, saying "The young Magdangal does an excellent job here, and her voice has matured impressively since Jolina; her delivery is polished and self-assured. Perhaps if she had sung these tunes first, she would be an international star." The Performer's Rights Society of the Philippines declared the album as one of the finest albums ever released in the Philippines.

== Commercial performance ==
Three days after its release, the album received a gold record certification from the Philippine Association of the Record Industry (PARI), making it the fastest album to reach the gold record certification since PARI took charge in awarding certifications. Eventually, the album received a 6× platinum certification from PARI.

== Track listing ==
No.	Title	Writer(s)	Original artist	Length
1.	"Crying Time"	Buck Owens	Buck Owens	2:55
2.	"Save Your Heart for Me"	Gary Geld and Peter Udell	Brian Hyland	4:02
3.	"Crazy"	Willie Nelson	Willie Nelson	3:53
4.	"P.S. I Love You"	Lennon–McCartney	The Beatles	2:22
5.	"Puppy Love"	Paul Anka	Paul Anka	3:31
6.	"All The Way"	Jimmy Van Heusen and Sammy Cahn	Frank Sinatra	3:15
7.	"The End of the World"	Arthur Kent and Sylvia Dee	Skeeter Davis	3:38
8.	"Sad Movies"	John D. Loudermilk	Sue Thompson	3:14
9.	"Sweet Sixteen"	Danny Subido, Eddie Nicholas	Vilma Santos	3:17
10.	"Where The Boys Are"	Neil Sedaka and Howard Greenfield	Connie Francis	2:56
11.	"You Don't Own Me"	John Madara and David White	Lesley Gore	2:43
12.	"Breaking Up Is Hard to Do"	Neil Sedaka and Howard Greenfield	Neil Sedaka	2:28
13.	"Too Young"	Sidney Lippman and Sylvia Dee	Nat King Cole	4:08
14.	"Because"	Dave Clark	The Dave Clark Five	4:04
15.	"Smile"	Charlie Chaplin, John Turner, and Geoffrey Parsons	Nat King Cole	3:22
16.	"Have A Good Time"	Felice and Boudleaux Bryant	Tony Bennett	3:22
Total length:				54:00

== Personnel ==
Adapted from the On Memory Lane liner notes.

- Vilma B. Selga, Charo Santos-Concio, & Federico M. Garcia – executive producers
- Vehnee Saturno – album producer
- Jong D. Azores – a&r supervision
- Beth N. Faustino – a&r coordinator
- Ronnie Salvacion – photographer
- Matt Rosanes & Jun Magdangal – album concept & design
- Deng Foz – hair & make-up
- Dino Cosio & Jeffrey Rogador – clothes
- Efren San Pedro & Boggie Manipon – recording engineers
- Efren San Pedro – mixing engineer
- Boggie Manipon – mastering engineer
