= Annie B. =

2004 film by Louie Ignacio

Annie B. (Bida Ng Ukay-ukay, Bongga siya 'day!)
- Directed by: Louie Lagdameo Ignacio
- Screenplay by: R.J. Nuevas
- Based on: Annie Batungbakal (1979) by Maryo J. de los Reyes

Alternative cover
- Produced by: Vic del Rosario Jr.
- Starring: Jolina Magdangal; Dingdong Dantes; Jordan Herrera
- Cinematography: Jun Gonzales
- Edited by: Marya Ignacio
- Music by: Gerdie Francisco
- Distributed by: Viva Films
- Release date: March 3, 2004
- Running time: 104 minutes
- Country: Philippines
- Language: Filipino

Annie B. (Bida Ng Ukay-ukay, Bongga siya 'day!) is a 2004 musical and romantic-comedy film released by Viva Films directed by Louie Ignacio. It stars Jolina Magdangal with Dingdong Dantes, Jordan Herrera, Gloria Romero, Amy Austria, and Sarah Geronimo.

== Production ==
The conceptualization and production of the film took almost two years to finish and had multiple delays in theatrical release. In 2002, it was reported that Magdangal will co-star with Nora Aunor in a sequel of the 1979 film Annie Batungbakal to be entitled Anak ni Annie Batungbakal.

After a year, in 2003, the filming started, but despite earlier reports, the final and released Annie B. was entirely different from the 1979 film.

== Cast ==
=== Main ===
- Jolina Magdangal as Anne
- Dingdong Dantes as Fernando
- Sarah Geronimo as Patty
- Jordan Herrera as Jasper
- Mel Martinez as TJ
- Gloria Romero as Lola Karay
- Amy Austria as Amelia
- Janice de Belen as Millet
- Armando Goyena as Alejandro
- Ronaldo Valdez as Amado
- Bobby Andrews as Alberto
- Jazz as Janine
- Iza Calzado as Trisha
- GJ as Lance
- Eagle Riggs as Augie
- Mel Kimura as Minerva
- Bacci Garcia and Tess Bomb as the Advertising Staff
- Mark Bautista as Mark

== Reception ==
The film received negative reviews from critics and was commercially unsuccessful. According to Ed de Leon of the Philippine Star, the main reason behind the film's commercial failure was the lack of publicity and promotional strategy, saying that the release of the film was as seem kept secret to moviegoers. In another article released a few months earlier, he said that the film's title was also a disadvantage leading to the audience proving that the film was just a re-issue of an earlier released film.

While in an article from the Pilipino Star Ngayon, it was said that the length of the filming and the multiple delays on its theatrical release were the factors that led to its poor box office performance.

== Soundtrack ==
=== Track listing ===
No.	Title	Writer(s)	Arranger	Length
1.	"Annie Batungbakal"	Dennis Garcia	Marvin Querido	3:27
2.	"Is It Ok I Call You Mine"	Paul McCrane	Noel Mendez	3:13
3.	"Because of You"	Keith Martin	Noel Esplenida	3:41
4.	"Awitin Mo"	Marvic Sotto and Joey De Leon	Alvin Nunez	4:48
5.	"Awitin Mo (Remix)" (Featuring Salbakuta)	Marvic Sotto and Joey De Leon
6.	"Annie Batungbakal (Minus One)"
7.	"Is It Ok If I Call You Mine (Minus One)"
8.	"Because of You (Minus One)"
9.	"Awitin Mo (Minus One)"

=== Personnel ===
Adapted from the Annie B. (Bida Ng Ukay-ukay, Bongga siya 'day!) Original Motion Picture Soundtrack liner notes.

- Jong Azores – album producer
- Vic del Rosario Jr. – executive producer
- Vincent del Rosario – executive producer
- Eugene Villaluz – associate producer
- Guia Gil-Ferrer – supervising producer
- Eric Carlo Flamiano – poster design
- Samuel S. Samson – album cover lay-out
- Salbakuta – rap lyrics (track 5)
- May Ann Casal Soriano – vocal arrangement and backup vocals (tracks 1, 4)
- Anthony Watson – remix & editing (track 5)
