= Philippine Association of the Record Industry =

Trade organization

- Abbreviation: PARI
- Formation: February 10, 1972; 54 years ago
- Legal status: Non-profit organization
- Headquarters: Suite 207 Greenhills Mansion; 37 Annapolis St., Greenhills, San Juan City, Metro Manila
- Chairman: Marivic Benedicto (Star)
- Affiliations: IFPI
- Website: pari.org.ph www.facebook.com/PARIinc/

The Philippine Association of the Record Industry (Filipino: Kapisanan ng Industriya ng Plaka ng Pilipinas, abbreviated as PARI) is a non-profit and private trade organization, that represents the recording industry distributors in the Philippines.

The PARI was formed on February 10, 1972, and is currently composed of 14 corporate members and 13 associate members. Since then, the association had worked with the Congress on drafting music copyright laws and had helped conduct raids on music pirates with the National Bureau of Investigation, Philippine National Police, Criminal Investigation and Detection Group, and the Optical Media Board.

It is also responsible for awarding music recording certifications in the Philippines. Annually, PARI organizes different music events such as the Awit Awards.

== History ==
In the early 1950s, music piracy started to grow in the Philippines. In response, in 1952, major recording companies organized the first recording industry association in the country called the Record Industry Association of the Philippines (RIAP). The association was mostly composed of foreign licensees. The first president of RIAP was Manuel P. Villar of Mareco. In 1971, independent record companies decided to bond together and formed the Philippine Recording Industry Association (PRIA). Its primary goal was to promote local records. The first president of PRIA was Jose Mari Gonzales from Cinema-Audio, an organization which cooperated with PRIA to fight piracy.

On February 10, 1972, another organization in the record industry was created, called the Philippine Association of the Record Industry (PARI). Antonio Lustre of the Home Industries Development Corporation (HIDCOR) was elected as its first president. After the first two organizations were disbanded, PARI became the only legitimate association of record companies in the Philippines, combining both major and independent record companies.

In 1990, the association began certifying recorded music in the Philippines. Constant Change by Jose Mari Chan was the first ever album to be certified. It was certified diamond on November 10, 1990. Since the awards program was launched, only eight albums were certified diamond by PARI. Aside from Constant Change, the other seven are:

- Christmas in Our Hearts by Jose Mari Chan
- Nina Live! by Nina
- A Wonderful Christmas by Christian Bautista
- Araw Oras Tagpuan by Sponge Cola
- Doo-Wops & Hooligans by Bruno Mars

Other than certifying albums, the organization also certifies singles and music videos. On January 16, 2013, the first ever single, "I'll Be There" by Julie Anne San Jose, was certified quadruple platinum. On the other hand, no music videos have been certified yet.

The Philippine Association of the Record Industry filed a complaint against the popular torrent website KickassTorrents, resulting in its seizure by Philippine authorities on June 13, 2013.

== Certification levels ==
Before 1990, music certifications were only awarded by record labels to their artists through their own sets of guidelines until PARI took the obligation and changed the criteria for album certifications over the years; following the International Federation of the Phonographic Industry (IFPI) guidelines.

Album certifications include both physical and digital sales. Beginning in March 2012, PARI began to certify singles (both digital and physical) and music videos. Before 2012, the thresholds for albums were distinguished between the domestic and international repertoire. Currently, domestic repertoire shares the same thresholds along with the international repertoire. The full list of music certifications is available on PARI's database.

=== Albums ===
Certification	1990 – "mid 2000s"	July 2004 – Oct. 2007	Oct. 2007 – Oct. 2008	Oct. 2008 – Apr. 2009	Apr. 2009 – Mar. 2012	Since Mar. 2012
Gold	20,000	15,000	15,000 (10,000)	12,500 (7,500)	10,000 (7,500)	7,500
Platinum	40,000	30,000	30,000 (20,000)	25,000 (15,000)	20,000 (15,000)	15,000
Diamond	400,000	300,000	300,000 (200,000)	250,000 (150,000)	200,000 (150,000)	150,000
"(number)" or italicized numbers in parentheses represents international repertoire, if different.

=== Singles ===
Certification	Since Mar. 2012
Gold	75,000
Platinum	150,000

=== Music videos ===
Certification	Since Mar. 2012
Gold	7,500
Platinum	15,000

== Members ==
The members of Philippine Association of the Record Industry are divided into two: corporate and associate. The corporate members are the major record companies while the associate members are the small, independent record companies.

=== Corporate ===
- Alpha Music
- Dyna Music
- GMA Music (formerly known as Infiniti Music)
- Ivory Music and Video (distributor of Sony Music catalog in the Philippines from mid-2011 to early 2018)
- MQuest Music
- PolyEast Records (formerly known as Canary Records, OctoArts International, OctoArts EMI Music and EMI Philippines)
  - Galaxy Records
- Praise Music
- Sony Music Philippines (formerly known as BMG Records Pilipinas and Sony BMG Philippines, re-opened in 2018)
- Star Music
  - Tarsier Records
- UMG Philippines (formerly known as PolyCosmic Records and MCA Music)
- Universal Records (formerly known as WEA Records)
- Viva Records
  - Vicor Music
- Warner Music Philippines

=== Associate ===
- Aika Records Music Production
- Amtrust Leisure Corporation
- Bellhaus Entertainment
- Business and Arts
- Careless
- Curve Entertainment
- Ditto Music Philippines
- HOMEWORKZ Entertainment Services
- Jesuit Communications Foundation
- Musikatha Ministries Foundation
- O/C Records
- Off the Record
- Pineapple Riddims Recording Company
- Shepherd's Voice Publications
- Signature Music
- Vertical Brew Music

== See also ==
- List of best-selling albums in the Philippines
