= Kung Ikaw Ay Isang Panaginip =

2002 film by Wenn Deramas

- Poster release for the film's remastered version
- Directed by: Wenn V. Deramas
- Written by: Mel Del Rosario; Ricky Lee; Wenn Deramas
- Story by: Leo Bernardo; Emman Dela Cruz; Katrina Flores; Johnny L. Manahan

Alternative Cover
- Produced by: Charo Santos-Concio; Malou N. Santos
- Starring: Jolina Magdangal; Leandro Muñoz; Rafael Rosell
- Cinematography: Sherman Philip So
- Edited by: Vito Cajili
- Music by: Jessie Lasaten
- Production company: Star Cinema
- Release date: January 30, 2002
- Running time: 103 minutes
- Country: Philippines
- Language: Filipino

Kung Ikaw Ay Isang Panaginip (transl. If you are but a dream) is a 2002 Filipino romantic comedy and fantasy film directed by Wenn V. Deramas and produced by Star Cinema. The cast was led by Jolina Magdangal, with Leandro Muñoz and Rafael Rosell in his introductory film. It is Magdangal's first solo starring film and her first and only film opposite Muñoz and Rosell.

It was Magdangal's last film with Star Cinema until 2021's Momshies! Ang Soul Mo'y Akin! as she transferred to GMA Network from 2002 to 2014.

== Cast ==
=== Main cast ===
- Jolina Magdangal as Rosalie
- Leandro Muñoz as Eric
- Rafael Rosell as Paolo

=== Special participation ===
- Nida Blanca as Fairy

=== Supporting cast ===
- John Lapus as Sugar
- Kaye Abad as Peachy
- Boboy Garovillo as Felipe
- Eugene Domingo as Josie
- Denise Joaquin as Beauty
- Rio Locsin as Helen
- Aljon Valdenibro as Niño

=== Others ===
- Karla Estrada as Bebang/Bisaya
- Justin Cuyugan as Wen/Ilokano
- Marvin Martinez as Shawie
- Michael Pamular as Age
- Athenea Pla as Korinna
- Nicole Hofer as Silk sister
- Cy Jaravata as Silk sister
- Don Laurel as Gym instructor boyfriend
- Roderick Lindayag as Pulis boyfriend
- Justine Estacio as Beauty's new boyfriend
- JR Luzarraga as Sugar's boyfriend
- Christian Santino as Mall guy
- Ced Torrecarion as Church guy
- CJ Tolentino as Bar guy
- Kathy Despa as Bar girl
- Julie Ann Cañeda as Billboard girl

== Reception ==
=== Box office ===
Although Magdangal did not attend the premiere night due to her commitment to her concert tour in the United States, the film was commercially successful. On its opening day, Kung Ikaw Ay Isang Panaginip registered the highest box office receipts compared to its competitions. For the box office success of the film, Magdangal received the citation Princess of Philippine Movies in the 33rd Box Office Entertainment Awards.

=== Critical response ===
The film received positive reviews from moviegoers and film critics with Butch Francisco of the Philippine Star saying "Kung Ikaw ay Isang Panaginip... is a fun movie to watch. Call it baduy if you wish, but we cannot close our eyes to the fact that it is a decently-made movie ... it is a very small movie with an obviously tight budget but I do appreciate the fact that it is inventive, creative and very energetic – with its every scene well-planned and well-thought of... It is a far cry from those usual small-budgeted run-of-the-mill Tagalog pictures that are downright stupid and assault the sensibilities of the viewers... Kung Ikaw ay Isang Panaginip is cute, fun and perky. More importantly, it stresses old positive values and traits that are so sorely lacking in most of our films today."

The film also marks Magdangal's first film without her long time screen partner Marvin Agustin, of which the team up has produced successful films in the past in FLAMES: The Movie (1997), Kung Ayaw Mo, Huwag Mo! (1998), Labs Kita... Okey Ka Lang? (1998), GIMIK: The Reunion and Hey Babe! (both 1999). Despite this, Magdangal's pairing with Rosell and Munoz in Kung Ikaw Ay Isang Panaginip received positive feedbacks from moviegoers.

== Soundtrack ==
- Panaginip
  Music: Lorie Ilustre
  Words: Dennis Garcia
  Arranger: Isaias Nalasa
  Performer: Jolina Magdangal
- Ay, Ay, Ay Pag-Ibig
  Composer: Norman Caraan
  Performer: Denise Joaquin

Note: Panaginip was later included in Magdangal's compilation album Jolina: Platinum Hits Collection released on 2002 by Star Music.

== Notes ==
- The film marks Nida Blanca's last film after she was stabbed to death in a condo parking in Makati City, Philippines on 7 November 2001. It was reported that Blanca's spirit was allegedly felt in the studio where Magdangal was dubbing her scenes with the actress. Producer Lita Santos later revealed that Blanca admires Magdangal seeing her youth in the latter. Blanca and Magdangal has starred in two other films before Kung Ikaw Ay Isang Panaginip, in Hataw Na (1995) and Ang TV Movie: The Adarna Adventure (1996).
- Magdangal's Kung Ikaw Ay Isang Panaginip (Star Cinema) and Judy Ann Santos' film May Pag-ibig Pa Kaya? (Starlight Films) were released on the same day (January 30, 2002), and the consecutive release developed their natural rivalry with critics believing that said rivalry is their generation's version, popularity wise, of the country's top rivalries in Gloria Romero and Nida Blanca and Nora Aunor and Vilma Santos.
- In 2003, Director Wenn Deramas revealed Kung Ikaw Ay Isang Panaginip as one of his favorite directorial films.
