= Malou N. Santos =

Filipino film producer (born 1957)

- Born: February 3, 1957 (age 69)
- Education: University of Santo Tomas (BSc. HRM)
- Occupations: Business executive, film producer, television producer, executive producer
- Years active: 1983–present
- Title: Managing director/COO of Star Cinema (1995–2018)
- Term: 1995 – December 2017

Maria Lourdes "Malou" Navarro Santos (born February 3, 1957) is a Filipino businesswoman and film producer. In 1993, she and her sister Charo Santos-Concio founded Star Cinema, for which she served as managing director from 1995 to 2017. During her tenure, Star Cinema rose from financial uncertainty to achieving high commercial success in the Philippine film industry.

== Early life and education ==
Malou Santos was born on February 3, 1957 to Winifredo Santos, a physician, and Nora Navarro-Santos. She has five siblings, including Maria Rosario ("Charo", born 1955).

Santos and her siblings grew up in Calapan, Oriental Mindoro, with her and Charo being fans of radio host Inday Badiday and of actress Nora Aunor by the 1970s.

She graduated with a Bachelor of Science degree in hotel and restaurant management at the University of Santo Tomas in Manila.

== Career ==
After her graduation, Santos started work as an assistant manager at Perpetual Savings Bank. Upon the insistence of her sister, actress and producer Charo Santos-Concio, Santos became a production assistant on the set of the 1984 action film Batuigas II: Pasukuin si Waway, which began her career in the film industry. Santos later served as line producer and associate producer for Regal Films in the 1980s. Santos was credited by filmmaker Olivia Lamasan with encouraging her to pursue writing and directing as a profession instead of advertising.

On May 8, 1993, Santos and her sister Charo founded Star Cinema Productions, Inc., or simply Star Cinema, with Santos as head of production. It was a successor to the sisters' former production company Vision Films, and is a subsidiary of the media conglomerate ABS-CBN. After Simon Ongpin left as managing director in 1995, Santos served as Star Cinema's managing director from 1995 to December 2017. Santos in 2001 had expressed that the 1995 romantic drama film Sana Maulit Muli was the last film she was "100 percent hands-on" as a producer, and cited it as one of Star Cinema's film productions that "really left a lasting impression on me". She was later credited with encouraging assistant director Rory B. Quintos to pursue directing for the studio.

As head of Star Cinema, Santos has been characterized as maintaining a lower profile than her sister Charo, who was among the top management at ABS-CBN. In September 1997, Viva Films executive Eric Cuatico moved to Star Cinema and became joint managing director with Santos, but left after two years in July 1999 to join the newly established Seven Crown Ventures of Jesse Ejercito, President Joseph Estrada's brother. Although the film studio did not often produce profitable films for most of its early years, by fiscal year 1998, most of Star Cinema's output was noted to have turned a profit.

In the 2000s, the films produced by Star Cinema under the management of Santos were among the most commercially successful films produced in the industry, regularly ranking among the top-grossing Filipino films of the year. By the time Santos stepped down as chief operating officer in 2017, Star Cinema films had surpassed on ten occasions the record for the highest-grossing Filipino film of all time: Isusumbong Kita sa Tatay Ko... (1999), Anak (2000), Ang Tanging Ina (2003), Sukob (2006), You Changed My Life (2009), No Other Woman and Praybeyt Benjamin (both 2011), Sisterakas (2012), It Takes a Man and a Woman (2013), and A Second Chance (2015).

In February 2016, Santos was named COO of Star Creatives. After Santos stepped down as Star Cinema's COO in December 2017, Lamasan was appointed as the new managing director while Santos remained as an executive adviser for the production company.

== Filmography ==
=== Film (pre-Star Cinema) ===
Year	Title	Credited as			Director	Studio	Note(s)
Year	Title	Supervising Producer	Associate Producer	Line Producer	Director	Studio	Note(s)
1984	Batuigas II: Pasukuin si Waway	No	No	No	Manuel 'Fyke' Cinco	Vanguard Films	as production assistant only
1985	Hindi Nahahati ang Langit	No	No	No	Mike de Leon	Vanguard Films	as production manager only with Eriberto Amazan Jr.
1985	Turuang Apoy	Yes	No	No	Luis Enriquez	Brown Fox Organization	
1985	Bomba Arienda	Yes	No	No	Mel Chionglo	Brown Fox Organization	
1986	Horsey-Horsey: Tigidig-Tigidig	No	Yes	No	Luciano B. Carlos	Regal Films	
1986	I Love You, Mama, I Love You, Papa	No	Yes	No	Maryo J. de los Reyes	Regal Films	
1986	Paalam... Bukas ang Kasal Ko	No	Yes	No	Maning Borlaza	Regal Films	
1986	Inday Inday sa Balitaw	No	Yes	No	Luciano B. Carlos	Regal Films	
1986	Batang Quiapo	No	Yes	No	Pablo Santiago	Regal Films	
1987	Forward March	No	Yes	No	Luciano B. Carlos	Regal Films	
1987	Jack en Poy: Hale-Hale Hoy!	No	Yes	No	Luciano B. Carlos	Regal Films	
1987	Bunsong Kerubin	No	Yes	No	Luciano B. Carlos	Regal Films	
1987	Asawa Ko, Huwag Mong Agawin	No	Yes	No	Maning Borlaza	Regal Films	
1987	Maria Went to Town	No	No	Yes	Luciano B. Carlos	Regal Films	
1988	Ibulong Mo sa Diyos	Yes	No	No	Elwood Perez	Regal Films	
1988	Rosa Mistica	Yes	No	No	Emmanuel H. Borlaza	Regal Films	
1988	Wake Up Little Susie	No	No	Yes	Luciano B. Carlos	Regal Films	
1988	Super Inday and the Golden Bibe	No	No	Yes	Luciano B. Carlos	Regal Films	
1988	Nagbabagang Luha	No	No	Yes	Ishmael Bernal	Regal Films	
1988	One Day, Isang Araw	No	No	Yes	Pablo Santiago	Regal Films	
1988	Petrang Kabayo at ang Pilyang Kuting	No	No	Yes	Luciano B. Carlos	Regal Films	
1988	Me & Ninja Liit	No	No	Yes	Jun P. Cabreira	Regal Films	
1989	Gorio en Tekla	No	No	Yes	Luciano B. Carlos	Regal Films	
1989	Impaktita	No	No	Yes	Teddy Chiu	Regal Films	
1989	Bilangin ang Bituin sa Langit	No	No	Yes	Elwood Perez	Regal Films	with Olive Lamasan
1990	Papa's Girl	No	No	Yes	Luciano B. Carlos	Regal Films	
1990	Bala at Rosaryo	No	No	Yes	Pepe Marcos	Vision Films	
1990	Kapag Langit ang Humatol	Yes	No	No	Laurice Guillen	Vision Films	
1991	Ganti ng Api	Yes	No	No	Marlon Bautista	Vision Films	
1991	Kailan Ka Magiging Akin	Yes	No	No	Chito S. Roño	Vision Films	
1992	Yakapin Mo Akong Muli	No	No	Yes	Elwood Perez	Regal Films	
1992	Hanggang May Buhay	No	No	Yes	Pepe Marcos	Bonanza Films	
1992	Mahal Kita, Walang Iba	No	No	Yes	Ishmael Bernal	Regal Films	
1993	Ms. Dolora X: Ipagtatanggol Kita	No	No	Yes	Elwood Perez	Regal Films	with Ray Maliuanag

=== Film (Star Cinema) ===
==== As "producer" only ====
Year	Title	Director	Note(s)
1994	Separada	Chito S. Roño	with Simon C. Ongpin
1995	Basta't Kasama Kita	Rory B. Quintos	with Simon C. Ongpin
1995	Sarah... Ang Munting Prinsesa	Romy V. Suzara	with Simon C. Ongpin
1995	Home Sic Home	Efren "Loging" Jarlego	with Simon C. Ongpin
1995	Patayin sa Sindak si Barbara	Chito S. Roño	with Simon C. Ongpin
1995	Sana Maulit Muli	Olivia M. Lamasan	with Simon C. Ongpin
1995	Asero	Joey del Rosario	with Simon C. Ongpin
1995	Hataw Na!	Jose Javier Reyes	
1995	Matimbang Pa sa Dugo	Jose N. Carreon	
1995	Mangarap Ka	Rory B. Quintos	
1996	Oki Doki Doc	Efren "Loging" Jarlego	
1996	Madonna and Child	Marilou Diaz-Abaya	Original title: May Nagmamahal Sa'yo
1996	Radio Romance	Jose Javier Reyes	
1996	Ama, Ina, Anak	Jose Javier Reyes	
1996	Milyonaryong Mini	Tony Y. Reyes	
1996	Sa Aking mga Kamay	Rory B. Quintos	
1996	Utol	Toto Natividad	
1996	Cedie	Romy V. Suzara	
1996	Mula Noon Hanggang Ngayon	Khryss Adalia	
1996	Madrasta	Olivia M. Lamasan	
1996	Lahar	Mel Chionglo	
1996	Mara Clara: The Movie	Emil Cruz Jr. Jerry Lopez Sineneng	
1996	Hangga't May Hininga	Toto Natividad	
1996	Ang TV Movie: The Adarna Adventure	Johnny Manahan	
1996	Kung Kaya Mo, Kaya Ko Rin!	Danilo P. Cabreira	
1996	Magic Temple	Peque Gallaga; Lore Reyes	
1997	Ang Pulubi at ang Prinsesa	Jerry Lopez Sineneng	
1997	Iskalawag: Ang Batas Ay Batas	Francis "Jun" Posadas	
1997	Paano ang Puso Ko?	Rory B. Quintos	
1997	Mariano Mison... NBI	Joey del Rosario	
1997	I Do? I Die! (D'yos Ko Day!)	Efren "Loging" Jarlego	
1997	Batang PX	Jose Javier Reyes	
1997	Calvento Files: The Movie	Laurenti Dyogi; Michael de Mesa	
1997	Wanted Perfect Murder	Boots Plata	
1997	Amanos, Patas ang Laban	Francis "Jun" Posadas	
1997	Flames: The Movie	Jerry Lopez-Sineneng; Khryss Adalia	
1997	Hanggang Kailan Kita Mamahalin?	Olivia M. Lamasan	
1997	Wala Ka Nang Puwang sa Mundo	Ronn-Rick	
1997	Ipaglaban Mo: The Movie II	Rory B. Quintos	
1997	Kokey	Romy V. Suzara	
1997	Ikaw Pala ang Mahal Ko	Jose Javier Reyes	
1998	Haba-Baba-Doo! Puti-Puti-Poo!	Efren "Loging" Jarlego	
1998	Kung Ayaw Mo, Huwag Mo!	Jerry Lopez Sineneng	
1998	April, May, June	Manny Castañeda	
1998	Muling Ibalik ang Tamis ng Pag-ibig	Boots Plata	
1998	Nagbibinata	Jose Javier Reyes	
1998	Dahil Mahal Na Mahal Kita	Wenn V. Deramas	
1998	Labs Kita, Okey Ka Lang?	Jerry Lopez Sineneng	
1998	Lualhati Bautista's Bata, Bata... Paano Ka Ginawa?	Chito S. Roño	
1998	Kay Tagal Kang Hinintay	Rory B. Quintos	
1998	Magandang Hatinggabi	Laurenti Dyogi	
1998	Hiling	Jose Javier Reyes	
1999	Type Kita... Walang Kokontra	Toto Natividad	
1999	Mula sa Puso	Wenn V. Deramas	
1999	'Di Puwedeng Hindi Puwede!	Francis "Jun" Posadas	with Rose L. Flaminiano
1999	Wansapanataym	Johnny Manahan	
1999	Isusumbong Kita sa Tatay Ko...	Boots Plata	
1999	Soltera	Jerry Lopez Sineneng	
1999	Alyas Pogi: Ang Pagbabalik	Joey del Rosario	
1999	Hey Babe!	Joyce Bernal	
1999	Suspek	Toto Natividad	
1999	Oo Na... Mahal Na Kung Mahal	Johnny Manahan	
1999	Tar-San	Efren "Lodging" Jarlego	
1999	Esperanza	Jerry Lopez Sineneng	
2000	Minsan, Minahal Kita	Olivia M. Lamasan	
2000	Tunay Na Tunay: Gets Mo? Gets Ko!	Bb. Joyce Bernal	

=== Television ===
Year	Title	Credited as	Notes	Ref(s).
1991–2020	Maalaala Mo Kaya	Supervising producer		
1998–1999	Sa Sandaling Kailangan Mo Ako	Executive-in-charge of production		
2000–2002	Pangako sa 'Yo	Executive-in-charge of production		
2002–2003	Kay Tagal Kang Hinintay	Executive-in-charge of production		
2005	Kampanerang Kuba	Executive-in-charge of production		
2006	Sa Piling Mo	Executive-in-charge of production		
2006–2007	Maging Sino Ka Man	Executive-in-charge of production		
2007	Maria Flordeluna	Executive-in-charge of production		
2007–2008	Ysabella	Executive-in-charge of production		
2007–2008	Maging Sino Ka Man: Ang Pagbabalik	Executive-in-charge of production		
2008	Lobo	Executive-in-charge of production		
2008	Kahit Isang Saglit	Executive-in-charge of production		
2009	Only You	Executive-in-charge of production		
2009–2010	Dahil May Isang Ikaw	Executive-in-charge of production		
2009–2010	Lovers in Paris	Executive-in-charge of production		
2010	Rosalka	Executive-in-charge of production		
2010	Magkaribal	Executive-in-charge of production		
2010–2011	Imortal	Executive-in-charge of production		
2011	Guns and Roses	Executive-in-charge of production		
2012	E-Boy	Executive-in-charge of production		
2012–2013	Princess and I	Executive-in-charge of production		
2013–2014	Got to Believe	Executive-in-charge of production		
2014–2015	Forevermore	Executive-in-charge of production		
2015	Bridges of Love	Executive-in-charge of production		
2015–2016	Pangako sa 'Yo (2015 remake)	Executive-in-charge of production		
2015–2016	You're My Home	Executive-in-charge of production		
2016	Dolce Amore	Executive-in-charge of production		
2016	The Story of Us	Executive-in-charge of production		
2017	A Love to Last	Executive-in-charge of production		
2017–2018	Pusong Ligaw	Executive-in-charge of production		
2017–2018	La Luna Sangre	Executive-in-charge of production		
2018	Bagani	Executive-in-charge of production		
2018–2019	Ngayon at Kailanman	Executive-in-charge of production		

== Discography ==
=== As executive producer ===
- Timeless, Piolo Pascual (2007)
- Para Lang sa 'Yo, Aiza Seguerra (2007)
- A Little Too Perfect, Sam Milby (2007)
- Charice, Charice Pempengco/Jake Zyrus (EP; 2008)

== Accolades ==
Year	Award-giving body	Category	Nominated work	Result	Ref.
1998	10th Gawad CCP Awards	Ten Outstanding TV Programs	Maalaala Mo Kaya	Won	
2013	The Philippine Quill Awards 2013	Communication Excellence in Organizations		Won	
