= Labs Ko si Babe =

1999–2000 Philippine television drama series

- Title card
- Genre: Romantic black comedy; Drama
- Created by: Enrico Santos; Jake Tordesillas
- Written by: Gina Marissa Tagasa; Aloy Adlawan
- Directed by: Jerry Lopez Sineneng; John D. Lazatin; Gina Marissa Tagasa
- Starring: Jolina Magdangal; Marvin Agustin
- Opening theme: "I Love You Babe" by Jolina Magdangal / Jeffrey Hidalgo, Richard Marten and Bojo Molina
- Composers: Vehnee Saturno; Annabelle Regalado
- Country of origin: Philippines
- Original language: Filipino
- No. of episodes: 322

Production
- Executive producer: Annaliza Goma
- Running time: 27–30 minutes
- Production company: Star Creatives

Original release
- Network: ABS-CBN
- Release: August 2, 1999 – November 10, 2000

Labs Ko si Babe (transl. babe is my loves, international title: I Love My Babe) is a Philippine television drama romance black comedy series broadcast by ABS-CBN. Directed by Jerry Lopez Sineneng and John D. Lazatin, starring Jolina Magdangal and Marvin Agustin. It aired on the network's evening line up from August 2, 1999 to November 10, 2000, replacing Esperanza and was replaced by Pangako Sa 'Yo.

Also known as the first romantic black comedy series in Philippine television.

== Premise ==
The lives of four families in San Clemente intertwine with drama and dark comedy, centered on the feud between former best friends Auring (Gloria Romero) and Felipa (Gina Pareño). Their animosity began when Auring lost a sweepstakes ticket Felipa entrusted to her, which Felipa believes was a winner.

Their conflict escalates, ensnaring their families, including the burgeoning romance between Auring's granddaughter, Cindy (Jolina Magdangal), and Felipa's grandson, Wally (Marvin Agustin). The situation is further complicated by the arrival of Miguel (Onemig Bondoc) from Italy, who befriends Cindy and sparks Wally's jealousy. Miguel's stepmother, the notorious Elena (Jaclyn Jose), creates additional problems for both families.

Amidst the chaos, Mayor Diwata (Zsa Zsa Padilla), known as Mayor Di, consistently intervenes to mediate their disputes. Mayor Di, who lives with her nephew Jobert (Bernard Palanca), remains single due to a troubled past.

== Cast and characters ==
=== Main cast ===
- Jolina Magdangal as Cinderella "Cindy" Angeles
- Marvin Agustin as Wardlito "Wally" Escallon

=== Supporting cast ===
- Gloria Romero as Aurora "Auring" Mabuenas
- Gina Pareño as Felipa Tolentino-Escallon
- Johnny Delgado as Paquito "Kit" Angeles
- Princess Punzalan as Guadalupe "Lupe" Mabuenas-Angeles
- Jaclyn Jose as Elena Deogracia
- Bembol Roco as Silvestre "Rocky" Escallon
- Carmi Martin as Viola Pagsisihan-Escallon
- Zsa Zsa Padilla as Mayor Diwata Royales
- Onemig Bondoc as Miguel Deogracia
- Bernard Palanca as Jobert Royales
- Bernardo Bernardo as Bonito
- Andrea Del Rosario as SPO2 Daniella "Dani" Acevedo
- Cheska Garcia as Gayle Deogracia
- Edgar Mortiz as Quintin "Q" Tolentino
- Edu Manzano as Alvin Reanzales / Eriberto Agustin
- Dominic Ochoa as Ulysses Angeles
- Jiro Manio as Miko Escallon
- Kristopher Peralta as Bernardo "Tato" Escallon
- Moreen Guese as Pie Angeles
- Gino Santos as Jimboy Escallon
- Roldan Aquino as Duke Deogracia
- Tanya Garcia as Lilet
- Audrey Vizcara as Anna
- Ian Galliguez as Duday
- Berwin Meily
- Dinky Doo as SPO1 Gil Crisostomo
- Rolly Padilla as Vice Mayor Amante
- Lucita Soriano as Anita Kalayaan
- Jinky Oda as Mina
- Janette McBride as Patricia
- Justin Cuyugan
- Denise Joaquin as Joan
- Hyubs Azarcon as Hercules Carpio
- Rey Kilay as Venus
- Leonardo Litton as Leo Valenciano
- Flora Gasser as Tiya Belen
- Menggie Cobarrubias as Luis
- Errol Dionisio as Mang Totoy
- Gabe Mercado as Atty. Nicholas Case
- Cris Daluz as Judge
- Gigi Locsin as Gunding
- Ced Carreon as Bryan
- Sylvia Sanchez as Aleta
- Tommy Abuel as David Sevilla
- Tom Olivar
- Ernie Zarate as Gov. Royales
- Drine Aguilar as Michelle
- Roy Rodrigo
- Ading Noche as Viola's henchmen
- Vincent Cebu as Viola's henchmen
- Lorna Lopez as Precy
- Bayani Agbayani as MTB host
- Vanessa del Bianco as MTB host

== Movie adaptation ==
After a month of the series premiering, it had a movie adaption called Hey Babe! released on August 25, 1999, produced by Star Cinema. The film was directed by Joyce Bernal.
