= Chef to Go =

Philippine television cooking show

- Title card
- Genre: Cooking show
- Presented by: Rob Pengson; Marvin Agustin
- Country of origin: Philippines
- Original language: Tagalog

Production
- Producer: Wilma Galvante
- Camera setup: Multiple-camera setup
- Running time: 60 minutes
- Production company: GMA Entertainment TV

Original release
- Network: Q
- Release: August 5, 2007 – 2009

Chef to Go is a Philippine television cooking show broadcast by Q. Hosted by Rob Pengson in the first and third season and Marvin Agustin in the second season, it premiered on August 5, 2007. The show concluded in 2009.

== Overview ==
It featured televiewers sending food requests to the show. If chosen, the show's host (Rob Pengson for the first season) would visit the kitchen of the chosen televiewer or celebrity guest and help them cook the food they requested.

The idea for the show came when Rob Pengson, director of the Global Culinary and Hospitality Academy, asked his student Rosebud Benitez (who was hosting on QTV at the time) if the school could be featured on tv. She then told him that QTV was preparing a new concept for a cooking show. He was then cast by Wilma Galvante to host the new cooking show.

For the second season, Marvin Agustin stepped in as host.

== Accolades ==
Accolades received by Chef to Go
Year	Award	Category	Recipient	Result	Ref.
2008	22nd PMPC Star Awards for Television	Best Educational Program	Chef to Go	Nominated	
2009	New York Festival		Chef to Go	Bronze	
