= Jolina Magdangal =

Filipino singer (born 1978)

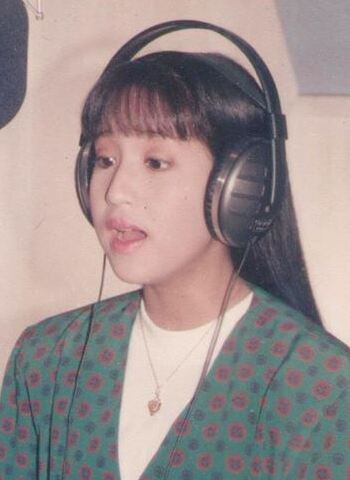
- Magdangal in 1994

Official Spokesperson for the Youth Office of the President of the Philippines
- In office 2004–2010

National Youth Ambassadress National Youth Commission
- In office 2004–2010
- Succeeded by: Dingdong Dantes

National Youth Advocate Office of the President of the Philippines
- In office 1998–2001

Personal details
- Born: Maria Jolina Perez Magdangal; November 6, 1978 (age 48) Quezon City, Metro Manila, Philippines
- Spouse: Mark Escueta (m. 2011)
- Children: 2
- Occupation: Singer; Actress; Television presenter; Entrepreneur
- Musical career
- Genre: Pop
- Instrument: Vocals
- Labels: Star Music GMA Music Viva Records

Maria Jolina Perez Magdangal-Escueta (Tagalog: [dʒɔˈlina magdɐˈŋal]; born November 6, 1978) is a Filipino singer, actress and television personality. Often referred to as the "Queen of Philippine Pop Culture". She is credited for heavily influencing pop culture in the late 1990s to early 2000s through her colorful fashion statements, camp style and impact on pop music. She has received a selection of accolades, including two FAMAS Awards, seven Box Office Entertainment Awards, an MTV Pilipinas Music Award and a commendation from the Asian Television Award.

At age 11, Magdangal began her career as a member of the singing group 14-K headed by Ryan Cayabyab. She was then launched in the youth oriented Ang TV (1992) and appeared in a number of teen romance productions. She has starred in several blockbusters, mostly in romantic comedies, including FLAMES: The Movie (1997), Kung Ayaw Mo, Huwag Mo!, Labs Kita... Okey Ka Lang? (both in 1998), GIMIK: The Reunion, Hey Babe! (both in 1999), Tunay na Tunay: Gets Mo? Gets Ko! (2000), Kung Ikaw Ay Isang Panaginip (2002), Home Alone Da Riber (2002), and Ouija (2007). Magdangal has also presented several television programs, including Magandang Buhay (2016–2026), one of the longest-running morning shows in the Philippines.

Magdangal is one of the best-selling Filipino artists of all time. Two of her albums, Jolina (1999) and On Memory Lane (2000), rank among the best-selling albums of all time in the Philippines. In 1994, she became the first Filipino artist to sign a recording contract with Walt Disney Records. In 2002, she became the first Filipino artist to perform at the Hula Bowl in Hawaii and the second Filipino artist to hold a concert at the Alex Theatre in California. Magdangal has been involved in charitable works and causes, including Filipino children and youth. In 1998, she was appointed by then Philippine president Joseph Estrada as the national youth advocate. The following year, she worked with then Philippine president Corazon Aquino as the youth spokesperson for The Children’s Hour. In 2002, she worked with then Philippine president Gloria Macapagal Arroyo as the host of the RPN-9's news magazine show The Working President.

== Early life and background ==
Maria Jolina Perez Magdangal was born on November 6, 1978 in Quezon City to Jun Magdangal and Paulette Perez. Her father worked in the marketing and public relations departments of San Miguel Corporation for two decades before resigning in 1993 to manage Magdangal's career. Her mother worked at the credit section of the Land Bank of the Philippines before handling the finance department of Magdangal's enterprises. Magdangal has two siblings, elder sister Melanie and younger brother Jonathan. (Note: See also "The joy of being Jolina" by the ABS-CBN.com posted on November 30, 2003)

After high school at Colegio de San Lorenzo in Quezon City, Magdangal attended a theater-arts course at the University of the Philippines which was cut short when AMA Computer University offered her a scholarship in Computer Science.

=== Personal life ===
In November 2011, Magdangal married Rivermaya's drummer Mark Escueta on a double-wedding ceremony, first on November 19 in a church wedding and the second is on November 21 in a garden wedding. They have two children, Pele Iñigo, born February 18, 2014, and Vika Anaya, born May 28, 2018.

== Career ==
=== 1989-1991: Early work ===
In 1989, Magdangal had her early beginning at the age of eleven as an entertainer through the singing group 14-K under the supervision and training of Master Composer, Ryan Cayabyab. During those years, she took lessons in singing from Cayabyab, dance from Douglas Nieras, and acting from Gina Alajar and Beverly Vergel.

=== 1992–1999: Breakthrough and stardom ===
In 1992, Magdangal had her breakthrough when she was discovered by talent manager and film and television director Johnny Manahan while performing with 14K in the weekly late night musical show Ryan Ryan Musikahan. She was then invited by Manahan to guest in the ABS-CBN sitcom Mana, which turned out to be her screen test. After her brief stint in Mana (1992), she made her professional television debut in the youth-oriented program Ang TV where she was featured in musical, sitcom and newscasting segments before she was given her own segment "Payong Kaibigan". Her inclusion as part of the Ang TV was also her launching as one of the pioneer contract artists of ABS-CBN's Talent Center (now Star Magic).

Magdangal's casting in Ang TV led to more television opportunities. Her early shows included the political satire-sitcom Abangan Ang Susunod Na Kabanata, daily noon-time program ‘Sang Linggo nAPO Sila (1995), and as one of the pioneer host-performer of Asia's longest-running musical variety show ASAP (1995). In ASAP, her most notable segments were "Tricykat" and "LSS (Love Songs & Stories)".

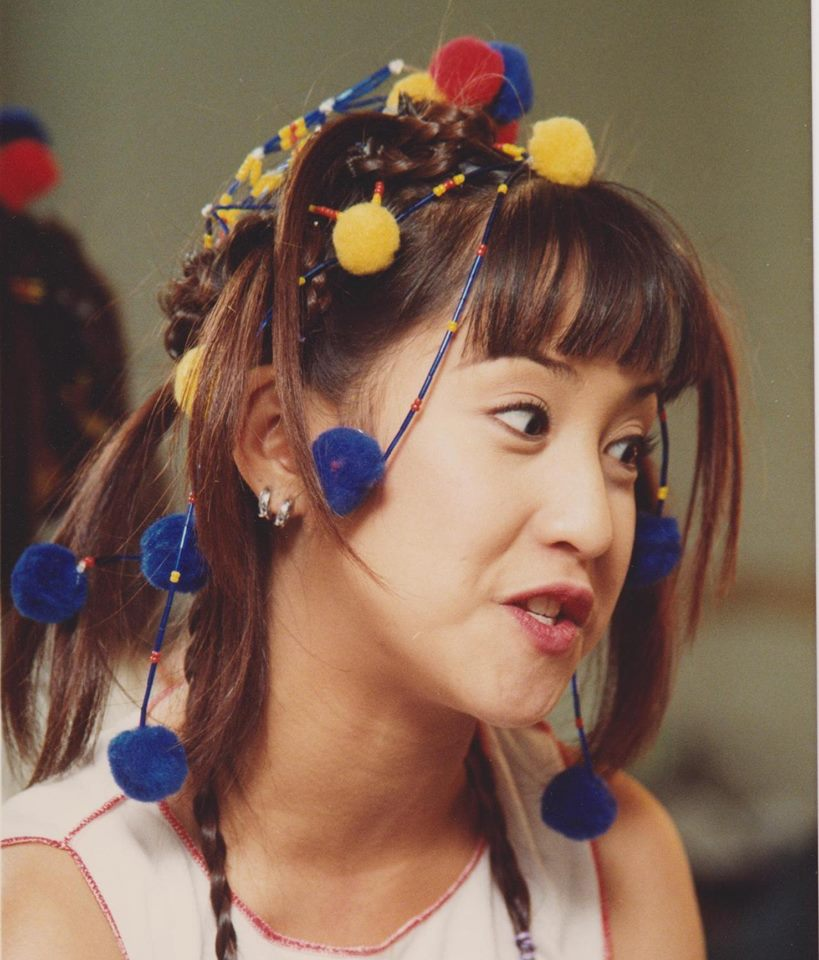
Jolina's camp style, most prevalent during the 1990s and 2000s

In 1994, Magdangal was chosen by Walt Disney Records to be its first Filipino recording artist to sing the theme songs of Disney classics Pocahontas (1995) and The Hunchback of Notre-Dame (1996) for Philippine promotion. Before that, she appeared in the accompanying soundtrack album for the show Ang TV, where she recorded "Magkaibigang Tunay", the theme song of her segment "Payong Kaibigan".

In 1995, Magdangal appeared in a small role in the film Hataw Na, with Gary Valenciano and Dayanara Torres. The following year, she had her first big role in the Ang TV-spin-off movie Ang TV: The Adarna Adventures, where she played the role of Princess Adarna, the human form of the Filipino mythical singing bird Ibong Adarna.

After recording theme songs that were non-album released and appearing in a couple of compilation albums, Magdangal released her debut album A Wish Comes True in 1996 under Walt Disney Records. The album was praised by critics for containing adventurous repertoire; with David Gonzales of All Music saying "An actress and television personality, has a fine voice that is full of depth and warmth [...] Magdangal has a promising future."

In 1997, Magdangal became known to a wider audience through the film adaptation of the television series F.L.A.M.E.S., and its accompanying soundtrack album where she recorded two original songs, "Sana’y Kapiling Ka" and "Tameme". The album was commercially successful earning her a double platinum. In the movie, she played Leslie, a rich high school student who has a cynical perception of love; who takes it badly when she learns of her classmate Butch's (played by Marvin Agustin) feelings for her. The Marvin-Jolina team later produced successful film and television projects that made them the "most admired, most followed and most loved team ups of their generation". While in Film Development Council of the Philippines's Sine Sandaan, a celebration of the 100th year of Philippine cinema, the tandem was recognized as one of the luminaries under the Love Team Ng Sentenaryo category for their unparalleled contribution and years of hard work for the Philippine cinema. Magdangal appears the major role as Karen Alonzo-Montejo in Esperanza (1997-1998), alongside co-stars Judy Ann Santos, Wowie de Guzman, Marvin Agustin, Angelika dela Cruz and Jericho Rosales.

Magdangal's first major role was in Adarna: The Mythical Bird, the Philippines' first full-length theatrical animated film, released on December 25, 1997 as an entry to the 23rd Metro Manila Film Festival.

Magdangal's next major role was in Kung Ayaw Mo, Huwag Mo! (1998), in which she played the role of Ditas who feels smothered by her loving yet strict sister Doris (played by Maricel Soriano). On working with the Philippine's Diamond Star Maricel Soriano, Magdangal revealed that to be cast alongside her idol is a dream come true for her especially that Soriano is a major influence in her acting career especially in the dramedy genre.

Magdangal's first critical and commercial success in film was the multi-million box office hit and Filipino classic Labs Kita... Okey Ka Lang? (1998), alongside Agustin, where she played Bujoy who fell in love with her best friend, Ned (Agustin's character). The movie produced the immortal line from Magdangal "Oh yes! Kaibigan mo lang ako... and I'm so stupid to make the biggest mistake of falling in love with my best friend." When the film was revived through digital restoration and remastering by the ABS-CBN Film Restoration Project in 2017, its revival premiere filled two cinemas at U.P. Town Center. The soundtrack album was also commercially successful, producing the Magdangal signature song "Kapag Ako Ay Nagmahal". The album was certified with a double platinum by the Philippine Association of the Record Industry (PARI) for selling more than 80,000 units.

In 1998, Magdangal was cast in Star Cinema's 1998 Metro Manila Film Festival official entry Puso ng Pasko. In this Christmas-themed film, Magdangal played Merry, the human form of a magical Christmas ornament, who grants wishes to those who believe in the true essence of Christmas. The film was the Festival's third best picture and Magdangal's performance earned her a Best Supporting Actress nomination.

By the end of the 1990s, Magdangal achieved further success in releasing her sophomore self-titled album Jolina (1999); top billing the blockbuster film Hey Babe! (1999) and headlining the romantic-comedy-drama series Labs Ko Si Babe (1999).

The album Jolina, which contains original and cover cuts, along with previously recorded songs from movie soundtracks, received a quadruple platinum certification at the end of the year, and was declared by PARI as the biggest selling album of 1999. Eventually, the album received a 7× platinum certification for selling more than 280,000 units. The album produced the Magdangal original song "Laging Tapat", which remained on the lists of top radio charts throughout the Philippines for weeks and her version of "Paper Roses", a revival that became a favorite nationwide. David Gonzales of the Philippine Daily Inquirer stated in a review: "[Magdangal] may not sing the most adventurous music around, as her repertoire consists mostly of the passionate, easy-listening love song that appeals to many Filipinos, but she has a voice and style that promises to withstand the test of time. [She] has a voice and delivery that deserves the attention it gets." (Note: Excerpt from "This young Jolina has depth" by David Gonzales / Philippine Daily Inquirer / January 1998.)

The film Hey Babe! was another project starring the Marvin-Jolina team. Directed by Joyce E. Bernal, Magdangal plays the role of a girl who's fond of consulting a fortune-teller on who her dream-boy should be. Agustin's character, her ardent suitor, conspires with the fortune-teller. The film is the last project of the pair in a full-length film. In television, the pair starred in the primetime series Labs Ko Si Babe, which enjoyed top ratings during its run and achieved top spot during its peak. The series is one of the longest-running ABS-CBN soap operas, airing for one year and three months; and is also the first Filipino romantic-comedy-drama series, making Magdangal the pioneer in romcom genre in Philippine television.

=== 2000–2013: Career expansion ===
In 2000, Magdangal released her third studio album On Memory Lane (2000), which consists entirely of remakes of originals coming from periods considered as the golden age of popular music. The album's packaging and its booklet also delivered a take on the nostalgia craze, with Magdangal costumed and photographed as a World War II beauty. On Memory Lane received a gold record certification from PARI three days after its release, making it the fastest-selling record since PARI took charge in awarding certifications. The album peaked with a 6× platinum certification for selling more than 240,000 units. The album is also considered by the Performers Rights Society of the Philippines as one of the finest albums ever released in the Philippine recording industry. Writing for allmusic.com, David Gonzales stated in a review: "The young Magdangal does an excellent job [in On Memory Lane], and her voice has matured impressively since 1998's (sic) Jolina; her delivery is polished and self-assured. Perhaps if she had sung these tunes first, she would be an international star. Despite consisting entirely of remakes, this is an enjoyable album, showcasing Magdangal's impressive development.".

In the same year, Magdangal portrayed a Chinese girl trying to escape an arranged marriage in the action romantic-comedy film Tunay na Tunay: Gets Mo? Gets Ko! (2000), alongside Robin Padilla. The film was critically and commercially successful earning Magdangal the citation "Princess of RP Movies" in the 31st Box Office Entertainment Awards. In television, she led the comedy sitcom Arriba, Arriba! (2000). The show was consistently ranked within the top 10 highest-rating television programs during its run.

Magdangal's next film was the fantasy romantic comedy Kung Ikaw Ay Isang Panaginip (2002), directed by Wenn V. Deramas. Magdangal played Rosallie, a maker and distributor of processed food who falls in love with a guy whose face is blown up in a toothpaste brand billboard. It was released in 2002, with Magdangal earning her second Princess of Philippine Movies citation from the Box Office Entertainment Awards. The film "showcased [Director Wenn] Deramas' penchant for the downright absurd ... which [featured] the typical [Magdangal]-character falling for a billboard model, [and was] framed like a typical romantic comedy, complete with a predictable love triangle and other stereotypical issues, but is differentiated by its extremely playful take on fantasy-based love."

In 2002, Magdangal released her fourth studio album, Jolina Sings the Masters to moderate success, earning a gold record certification. A critical success for its repertoire and packaging, (Note: See Starstudio Magazine.) the album was considered a first in the local industry for putting up, together, master composers in a single album. Among the contributors on the album is David Pomeranz, who wrote two original songs for her. (Note: See also "Jolina Magdangal grows up in new album" by Edmund L. Sicam / Inquirer News Service / September 27, 2002)

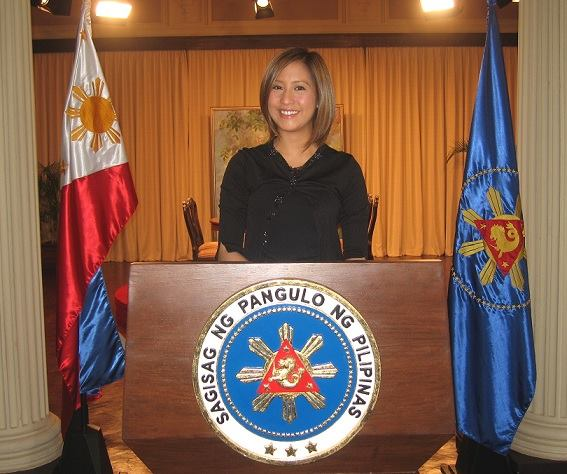
Magdangal at the Malacañang Palace while taping for The Working President, 2007

Magdangal's next television engagement was The Working President (2002), a public affairs news magazine program produced by the Office of the Press Secretary of the Office of the President of the Philippines. The show features projects of the administration of then President Gloria Macapagal Arroyo, and the activities of the President herself. The selection of the personality to host the program was done by the Office of the President through a commissioned survey on the most preferred personality in the country, along with background investigations on family, endeavours and achievements. The program aired on National Broadcasting Network, the public television network owned by the Philippine Government.

In mid 2002, after a series of television guest appearances in GMA Network's programs, Magdangal had her first GMA Network series in Book 2 of Kahit Kailan (2002). The show became the most popular Philippine import show after ABS-CBN's Pangako Sa 'Yo has ended its run. Kahit Kailan was shown in TV3, Malaysia's most popular channel, which also has direct broadcast in Singapore as a regular channel. (Note: See "Kahit Kailan, #1 sa Malaysia at Singapore" / Weekend News by Dinno Erece /Taliba / 2005)

In December 2002, comedian Dolphy teamed with Magdangal in Home Alone Da Riber, an official entry in the 2002 Metro Manila Film Festival.

Magdangal's first daily series following Labs Ko Si Babe was Narito Ang Puso Ko (2003), also her first primetime series in GMA Network. The series featured an ensemble cast including Rosa Rosal, Eddie Garcia, Amy Austria, Dina Bonnevie, Raymond Bagatsing, Ariel Rivera and Carmina Villarroel. Directed by Eric Quizon and Gina Alajar, Magdangal played the role of a long-lost granddaughter of a wealthy Doña and was torn between the love interests of the characters of Raymart Santiago and James Blanco. The program was a breakthrough for GMA Network when the show, along with the talent search Starstruck, was able to out-rate its rival network in primetime soaps for the first time. (Note: See Tumbok / Dinno Erece / November 2003)

December 2003, Magdangal represented the Philippines in the ASEAN-Japan Pop Festival, organized by Japan Foundation, held at Yokohama, Japan. The concept and aim of the Festival is "to find synergy among the diverse cultures of Japan and the ASEAN countries and to bring about a sense of togetherness and community among a wide range of people who support it, through exchanges in popular music".

In 2004, Magdangal was chosen by the newly set up GMA Records to be its banner artist through its initial album offering, Forever Jolina. The record, which was a moderate success, receiving a gold record certification, produced the hit song "Bahala Na" and the music video, directed by Louie Ignacio, won Magdangal the Favorite Female Artist award in the MTV Pilipinas Awards 2004.

In the same year, Magdangal top billed the film Annie B., a critical and commercial failure. Despite the film in general being panned by critics, Magdangal's performance earned her a nomination in the 2005 Entertainment Press’ Golden Screen Awards (ENPRESS) for Best Actress in Musical or Comedy. The film's soundtrack received mixed reviews. Rito P. Asilo of the Inquirer News Service noted that "[Magdangal's] repertoire may have tenuous lyrical content, but her rich and naturally soulful voice, the album's best asset, makes utterly familiar tunes seem fresh and personal. When [Magdangal] sings, she bends, breaks and expertly sections her musical notes and vocal shifts with precision." (Note: No available online data. See Rito P. Asilo (February 11, 2004), Jolina's voice is 'Annie B.' soundtrack's best asset, Inquirer News Service)

Magdangal's next television appearances were her hosting stints in the reality talent search Starstruck (Kids Edition (2004), Season 2 (2004), Season 3's StarStruck: The Nationwide Invasion (2005), and Season 4's StarStruck: The Next Level (2006)); and the longest-running morning public affairs/newscast show Unang Hirit (2005). (Note: The show started in 1999; Magdangal became a regular cast only in 2005) The shows earned Magdangal hosting nominations in the PMPC Star Awards for Television, winning three.

In 2006, Magdangal reunited with Marvin Agustin in the series I Luv NY, co-starring Starstruck winners Jennylyn Mercado and Mark Herras. Directed by Louie Ignacio, the series was publicized as "the first Philippine primetime TV soap to use a world-class location as its backdrop" with the majority of its episodes filmed in New York City. I Luv NY registered one of the most impressive pilot week ratings in the history of Philippine primetime television. In July of the same year, she released a special edition of her sixth studio album Tuloy Pa Rin Ang Awit, launched earlier that year, to include the theme song of I Luv NY, "Makulay Na Buhay". The album, under GMA Records, also produced the hits "Maybe It's You", "Gusto", and "Let Me Be The One", a collaboration with Janno Gibbs.

In Magdangal's next film, the horror flick Ouija, she shared top billing with Judy Ann Santos and was also joined by Iza Calzado and Rhian Ramos. Directed by Topel Lee, the film was based on a National Geographic Channel documentary about a British family that inappropriately used a Ouija board inadvertently trapping a spirit. The film was a commercial success; according to Box Office Mojo, it grossed over $2,094,108, the third highest grossing Filipino film of 2007.

In 2008, Magdangal was selected to judge in the music competition Pinoy Idol, an international TV franchise distributed by Fremantle Media, alongside singer-composer Ogie Alcasid and retired talent manager Wyngard Tracy. Her selection as one of the judges was marred with controversy when her competence was questioned by some viewers. That same year, she released her seventh studio album Destiny with two of the songs, her cover of "Will of the Wind" and the original "Umibig Ka", used as soundtrack in her next film I.T.A.L.Y (I Trust and Love You) (2008). The film, where she starred along with Dennis Trillo, Eugene Domingo, Rufa Mae Quinto, Mark Herras and Rhian Ramos, featured five countries, and 13 cities as background of the story of intertwining lives and destinies of six people on a seven-day cruise aboard Costa Magica. Box Office Mojo puts the film's gross to only Php 40,614,236, a commercial failure. At the same year, she was also appeared as a guest performer on Eat Bulaga! which then-produced by TAPE Inc. until 2024 when Magdangal best friends Tito Sotto, Vic Sotto and Joey de Leon (TVJ) regaining the trademarks and copyrights of the show which would be later used it for their own program on TV5.

In 2009, Magdangal reunited with Marvin Agustin to appear in the romantic comedy series Adik Sa'Yo. Directed by Joel Lamangan, the series marked the pair's first mature role in television after portraying teenybopper roles in their past projects. The series, also released on DVD the following year, had a modest debut before claiming top spot ratings in its timeslot.

In the first half of 2010s, besides performing in Sunday musical variety show Party Pilipinas, and its replacement Sunday All Stars (2013); co-hosting the tabloid talkshow Personalan: Ang Unang Hakbang with Jean Garcia, and; mentoring aspirants in Protégé: The Battle For The Big Artista Break (2012), Magdangal took supporting roles in different series. In film, Magdangal took a hiatus throughout the 2010s, during which she made no films other than the limited-release independent film Agawan Base (2011). In 2011, she co-starred in television with Claudine Barretto, Marvin Agustin, Luis Alandy and Milkcah Wynne Nacion in Iglot, a drama-fantasy and spin-off to the 2004 series Mulawin. In My Daddy Dearest (2012), she played a special role as mother to Milkcah Wynne Nacion's character. She also portrayed one of the antagonists, her first in such a role, in Mundo Mo'y Akin (2013).

=== 2014–present: Continued success ===
By November 2014, Magdangal started taping episodes for her next television series FlordeLiza (2015), premiered January 2015, indicating her return to ABS-CBN after 12 years with GMA Network. Reuniting with Marvin Agustin and Director Wenn Deramas, Magdangal played a mistress role, a first in her acting career. The series was a moderate success in viewing figures, coming from a single digit ratings in its pilot week to a stable double digits during its run and out-rating its competition in its final airings.; a critical success, it was extended to a month and was nominated Best Daytime Drama Series in the 29th PMPC Star Awards for Television with Magdangal nominated in the Best Drama Actress category.

In 2015, Magdangal appeared in the first season of Your Face Sounds Familiar (2015) as a performer-impersonator. Of the 12 week competition, she won two performances; her impersonations of Cher and Manny Pacquiao. A music icon herself, she was also impersonated by co-performer Melai Cantiveros in the same season, Onyok Pineda in the Kids Edition and by Vivoree Esclito in the third season. Despite failing to enter the final four stage of the competition, Magdangal was acknowledged by critics as a deserving finalist with entertainment writer Nestor U. Torre of the Philippine Daily Inquirer saying "[Magdangal] is, aside from being gifted and versatile in her own right, a star. Of all of the tilt's eight 'celebrity' impersonators, only [Magdangal] has ever made it to certifiable major and consistent star status. [She] has 'carried' many a TV and film production, so she has the stellar 'K' and 'cred' [others] have yet to attain."

Late 2015, after a seven year hiatus in the recording industry, Magdangal released her eighth studio album Back to Love through digital downloading and streaming, containing seven original songs. In 2016, Magdangal returned to the ASAP stage as one of the program's second decade main hosts and to host her segment "Love Songs & Stories (LSS)". However, on the second quarter of 2018, she left the show to give birth to her second child and never returned in time of the show's reformatting to ASAP Natin 'To.

In February 2016, she released the expanded version of her album Back to Love to include latest versions of her original hits "Kapag Ako Ay Nagmahal" and "Chuva Choo Choo", the latter was a collaboration with Vice Ganda. The expanded album was also released on physical copies; after two weeks in the market, she was awarded by PARI with a gold record certification. In the 8th PMPC Star Awards for Music, Magdangal was named Female Recording Artist of the Year and the album was nominated for the Album of the Year category.

Her next hosting stint is in the morning show Magandang Buhay (2016), with Karla Estrada, Melai Cantiveros and Jodi Sta. Maria. The show was airing weekdays in the morning slot until 2026.

Magdangal's next role as judge following Pinoy Idol was in the amateur singing competition Tawag ng Tanghalan Kids (2017) and its regular edition's second (2017), third (2019), and Tawag ng Tanghalan: All-Star Grand Resbak (2019) editions, aired as a segment in the noontime show It's Showtime.

In 2019, Magdangal started guesting in the reformatted ASAP show ASAP Natin 'To and has since continued to appear occasionally as a performer until today. After a decade of hiatus in doing films, Magdangal made a comeback in the 2021 film Momshies! Ang Soul Mo'y Akin!, a collaboration with her Magandang Buhay co-hosts Karla Estrada and Melai Cantiveros.

In addition to her weekdays hosting stint at Magandang Buhay since 2016, she continued to become a recurring judge in the noontime show Tawag ng Tanghalan from its Season 4 (2020), Season 5 (2021), Season 6 (2022), Season 7 (2023), and its current season dubbed as Tawag ng Tanghalan: The School Showdown (2024). Also in 2023, Magdangal joined the game show 'Sang Daang Pienalo aired weekend nights at Pie Channel.

In 2024, Magdangal joined the cast of the action-drama series and Dreamscape Entertainment produced Lavender Fields as Lily Atienza with Jodi Sta. Maria, Janine Gutierrez, Jericho Rosales, and Maricel Soriano. This project marked her comeback in doing drama series after almost a decade since the 2014 FlordeLiza afternoon soap.

In February 2025, Magdangal starred in the romantic-comedy film Ex Ex Lovers reuniting with Marvin Agustin in the big screen after almost two decades. Produced by Antoinette Jadaone and directed by JP Habac, the film's principal photography took place in Malta and has generated positive feedback from casual viewers with its teaser, official trailer, and poster quickly gaining traction on social media. Through this film, Magdangal also donned the Executive Producer's hat for the first time in her career. The film is critically successful receiving positive reviews from film critics. Philbert Dy lauds the films take in "[reminding] people of what our romantic films used to be like...[b]ut it also manages something deeply modern in its romantic travails, and ends up providing something new in exploring something old." Aside from the story and production, main cast Magdangal and Agustin were also praised by viewers and critics for their undeniable chemistry. Tagged as the "Original Romantic Comedy Royalties", the pair's "delightful chemistry [which] was effortless, genuine and sincere" is evident in the entire run of the film. Known as a Movie Themesong and Soundtrack Queen, Magdangal released her version of the OPM classic "Tuloy Pa Rin" produced by Cornerstone Entertainment through digital platforms as the official soundtrack of the film. Two months after its theatrical release, the film crossed over in the streaming platform Netflix where it debuted at No. 1.

On June 2025, Magdangal returns to Idol franchise as she teams up with Robi Domingo to host the Kids edition of ABS-CBN's Idol Philippines. It can be remembered that Magdangal first joined the franchise in 2008 as a judge in GMA Network's Pinoy Idol.

From August to October 2025, she made her theater debut in a rerun of the Philippine Educational Theater Association's "Walang Aray". The act is a comedy musical with original music and a strong ensemble cast. The play was well-received in its previous runs, leading to this rerun due to popular demand. Magdangal's character, Doña Juana, is described as a '19th century TDH with a brain'. The musical is directed by Ian Segarra, with Rody Vera as the playwright and Vince Lim as the musical director.

== Other activities ==
=== Concerts ===
Magdangal has staged concerts and tours in the islands of the Philippines and in major cities around the world, either solo or with other artists. Among her notable concert activities include the following:

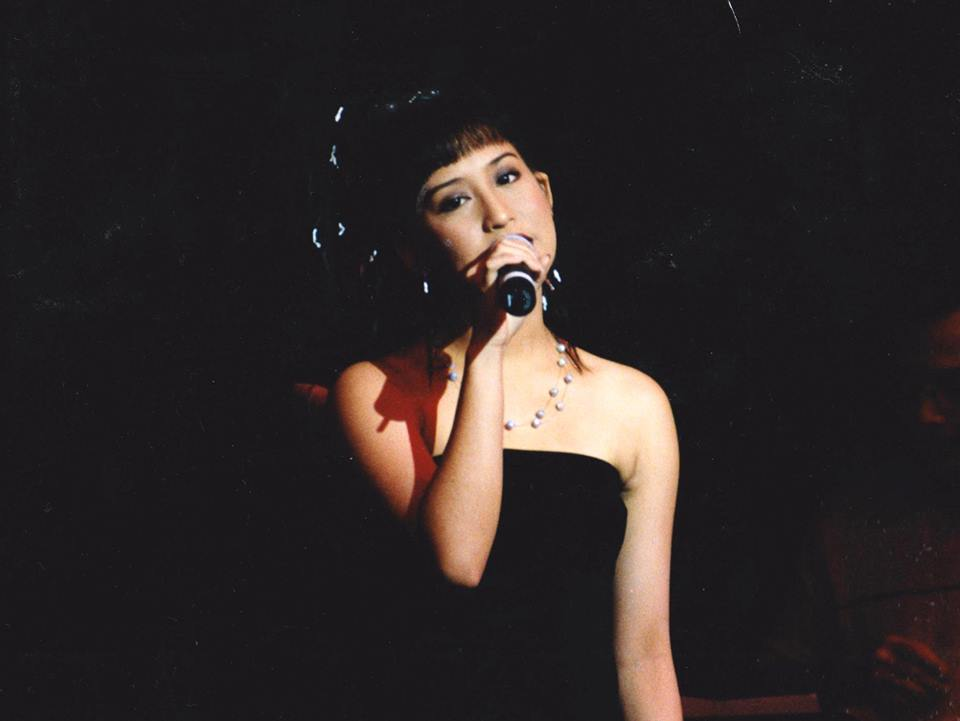
Magdangal performing in San Diego, California, circa 1990s

- In 2000, she did a solo concert at Queen's College Hall in New York City.
- In 2001, Magdangal staged the two-day "Arriba Arriba Concert" at Neal S. Blaisdell Center in Hawaii. The concert was supposed to be a one day event, but due to the unprecedented number of spectators, the concert was extended for another day.
- March 2001, she headline a concert in Sydney, Australia; and in March she performed in concert with international singer-composer David Pomeranz in Chicago.
- In September 2001, she performed in concerts at Reno, Nevada, Las Vegas, and Los Angeles.
- October 2001, she had a solo concert at Saipan; November of the same year, she performed in concert at China.
- In 2002, she was the first and only Filipino artist to be invited to do a pre-game performance at Hula Bowl, a much-celebrated annual college football game in Hawaii, and was attended by more than 30,000 spectators coming from Hawaii and mainland US. Said event was covered by cable-TV ESPN and shown all throughout the United States.
- In the same year, Magdangal did a solo concert "Jolina Live in Glendale" at the historic Alex Theatre in Glendale, California. She was the second Filipino artist to perform in said historic and prestigious theater next to Nora Aunor.
- Also in 2002, she had a four-city tour in California at the United States. She performed at San Francisco, Sacramento, San Diego, and Los Angeles.
- In 2003, Magdangal did a headlining concert in Cebu, Philippines. Produced by Thoughts and Notions, she filled the Cebu Sports Center with more than 35 thousand spectators. The said concert signalled the opening of the 2003 Sinulog Festival.
- On March 1, 2003, she staged her first major solo concert in Metro Manila billed as "Jolina Mania", produced by MaxiMedia and was held at the Smart Araneta Coliseum. Magdangal was the first young artist to perform and fill the then proverbial last frontier of concert artists in the Philippines.
- In 2004, she staged solo concerts at Toronto and Vancouver in Canada.
- At Europe, she did a four-city concert tour called as "Kumustahan 2006", produced by Star Events. In this tour, she performed for the Overseas Filipinos in Amsterdam, Vienna, London and Milan.

=== Products and endorsements ===
Note: The list of endorsements in this section is not chronologically arranged.
At the height of her career, Magdangal was one of the high-profile endorsers in the Philippines along with Sharon Cuneta, Aga Muhlach, Michael V. and Regine Velasquez. She was elevated among the country's handful of credible product endorsers in print, television and radio platforms, which led to Preview Modelling Agency naming her an image model for inspiring would-be models to elevate product endorsing to a higher level. She was also called commercial princess next to Sharon Cuneta, with the Philippine Star in 2003 saying "The [megastar ...] is said to be a very effective endorser. In fact, she is top of mind among the advertising industry's choices of endorsers, followed by Jolina Magdangal [and] Aga Muhlach...".

Magdangal's most notable endorsements varies from hair care product, fast-food restaurant, canned food products, juice drink, baked food product biscuit, clothing line, and stationery products, to name a few. Magdangal was also previously chosen to be the image model of a line of cosmetics for teens by a direct selling company; an institution of higher education; a government-owned universal bank and a government-controlled corporation providing funds for health programs and charities of national character; and phone cards of a telecommunications company. In 2000, she was chosen to be the spokesperson of the Philippine's first pre-need company; while in 2008 she was tapped by an on-line marketplace to be its Style Ambassador. Mid 2000s, Magdangal was selected to be the image model of an entire direct selling company appearing in the covers of its catalogs.

Most recently, following her giving birth to two children, she was then seen endorsing children-friendly products including medicines, disposable baby diaper, and powdered formula milk drink.

=== Writing and vlogging ===
In 1999, Magdangal had her weekly column "Sincerely Yours, Jolina" in the Super Teen Magazine.

In 2007, she entered in the blogosphere through Philippine Entertainment Portal, billed as "Chuva Chika".

In 2008, Magdangal had her weekly column in Inquirer Bandera "Fashionista".

In 2010, Magdangal launched her own magazine Jolie, a style and entertainment magazine published by OctoberEighty Publications.

In 2018, she started uploading vlog entries in her YouTube channel, "Jolina Network". In June 2019, she was awarded by YouTube with a Silver Play Button for surpassing 100,000 subscribers.

=== Philanthropy and activism ===
In 1999 and 2002, Magdangal was the Ambassadress of Goodwill of The Children's Hour, representing the youth and the entertainment industry. The campaign was a series of global fundraising events calling out individuals and corporations across 20 countries to donate an hour's worth of their earnings to support the less fortunate children. (Note: See also "Jolina spokesperson uli ng ' Children's Hour' / Pilipino STAR Ngayon / September 16, 2002.)

In 2006, Magdangal had her long locks trimmed by 14 inches, a first in 17 years, to start and organize a project that will gather hair for donation to an appropriate organization that makes wigs for cancer patients.

== Legacy ==
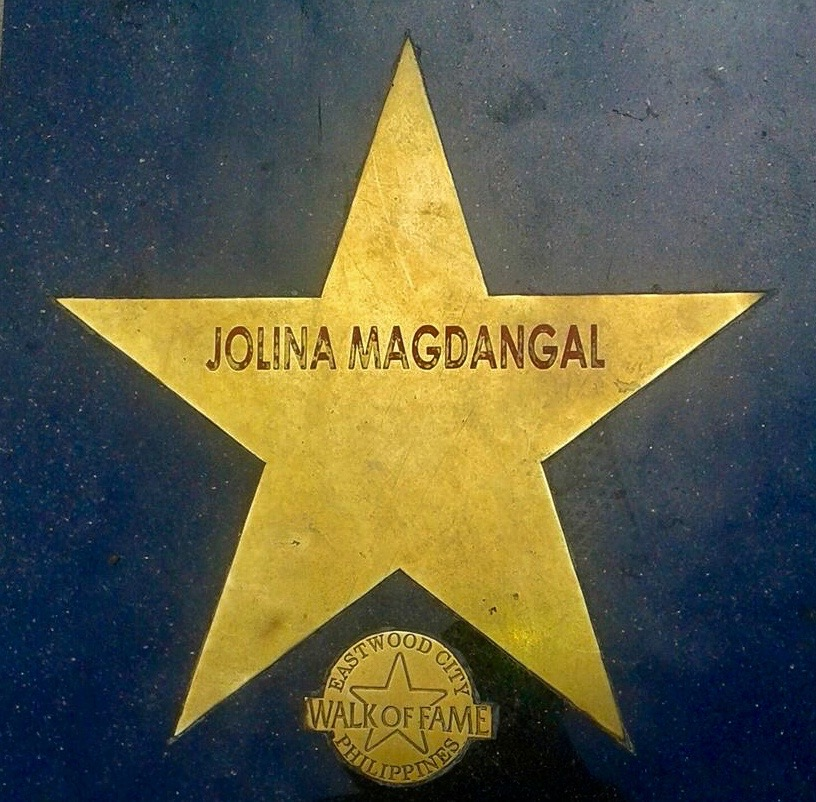
Magdangal's star in the Philippines Walk of Fame

Magdangal is regarded in the Philippines as a popular culture icon (Pop Icon) for bringing popular culture into a wider audience since the 1990s. As witnesses to this cultural landscape, entertainment writers Shinji Manlangit and Don Jaucian of The Philippine Star introduced Magdangal as a "[g]reat Pinoy pop culture philosopher" in their write-up in attempting to filter the best and the worst of celebrity culture. While in a collaboration effort of entertainment writers Ian Urrutia, Katrina Santiago, and selected panelists of the lifestyle magazine FHM Philippines, Magdangal was credited to have built a legacy that goes beyond film, television and music. According to the panel:

She has secured her status as a pop culture icon whose impeccable blend of camp aesthetics and playful visual quirks remained relevant to this day.

In the 33 Things You'll Know If You're A Filipino list by the American internet media and news company, BuzzFeed, Magdangal's "cultural impact" landed in the second spot, while her early program Ang TV occupied the top of the list. In 2009, she was awarded her own star in the Eastwood City Walk of Fame; while she was also inducted into the Paradise of Stars in the Mowelfund compound earlier in 2007. Famed for her colorful and distinct fashion style, Magdangal has also been referred to as a fashion icon of her time. Writing for the Entertainment section of abs-cbn.com, Mary Ann Bardinas stated: "...she also became an icon when it comes to fashion. Her quirky and bubbly persona and flamboyant and psychedelic style became her trademark... One of her major influences were the glittery and colorful butterfly hair clips in different shapes and sizes. Besides, her full bangs with long hair, striking highlights and crazy braids also became a trend among young girls and teenagers. Apparently, she wasn't afraid to experiment and to veer away from the norms, and established her own rules when it comes to styling herself. She'd been the trendsetter for unique, flashy and girly styles."

"Inconceivable as it is, there was a time when anything Filipino was considered uncool — culturally baduy and inferior compared to its Asian or Western counterparts... Jolina Magdangal was baduy, Britney Spears wasn't... But as appreciation of local culture became even more amplified — and as Filipinos themselves pushed for more quality products, anything Pinoy can now stand on the shoulders of cultural giants. Heck, Jolina Magdangal is now an icon".

— CNN Philippines . CNN Philippines / Life / Style / Design on . April 3, 2017. Retrieved February 12, 2018.

Magdangal's style is often defined as "walking Christmas tree", with entertainment writer Bianca Geli of pep.ph saying: "The 1990s fashion may have come and go, but [Magdangal's] offbeat fashion, like a 'walking Christmas tree,' is an indelible trademark of the era." Her fashion statements led to the creation of Jolina Dolls, the first line of dolls that were made in the image of a Filipino personality, and the Teen Scents by Jolina of a direct selling company, known to be the first fragrance formulated for Filipina teens. Her influences were also used as subject in different studies including undergraduate thesis (Note: See "Nuna (Labs Ko Si Jolina)" by Aleah Aliporo / 2001 / University of the Philippines - Diliman / College of Mass Communications.) (Note: See also, "Ang bituing makulay na si Babe : ang Pinay fashion icon na si Jolina Magdangal tungo sa iconograpiyang pangmasa" by Suzanne Marie Ramos / 2008 / De La Salle University - Manila / College of Liberal Arts.) and books. (Note: See "Negosyo : Joey Concepcion's 50 inspiring stories of entrepreneurs" / foreword by Jose Ma. Concepcion III; with lessons on entrepreneurship from Vivienne Tan; photography by Jun de Leon; [writers, Mariz M. Bayani ... et al.]. [Makati City] : Zurbano Pub., [2008].) (Note: See "Faces of the century: timeless tales of beautiful women / edited by Jorge Llanes, Quezon City : Le Grande Publishing, c1999.) In 1999, the Philippine Atmospheric, Geophysical and Astronomical Services Administration organized a contest to allow Filipinos name storms that would enter the Philippine Area of Responsibility and the name "Jolina" came up. It is believed that the winning name, Typhoon Jolina, is from Magdangal herself who was during that time the most familiar celebrity appearing everywhere in films, TV and magazines.

Stars of today have cited Magdangal's influence on them, directly or indirectly; among them are: Toni Gonzaga, who shared in an interview on how Magdangal influenced her back when she was starting in the industry; Heart Evangelista, saying "...I was definitely a fan of my dear friend Jolina Magdangal. I thought she was very unique and remind me of people that really celebrated their individuality... I remember when I saw Jolina Magdangal, she had all these clips and she would dress up and didn’t mind if she mixed patterns and whatever. I really loved that about her because it made her unique.”; Bea Alonzo, who thanked Magdangal for being an inspiration through the latter's soap operas and sitcoms; Angel Locsin, who revealed that she was once a backup dancer in one of Magdangal's music video; Dimples Romana, who shared how Magdangal had influenced her in being kind to younger actors and instilled to her how kindness pays forward; Yeng Constantino, who thanked Magdangal for being an idol of her generation; Jodi Santamaria, who recalled making professional television debut in one episode of Magdangal's drama series; Filipino internet sensation Jake Zyrus, who said in an interview on how Magdangal influenced him when he was a kid; Kiray Celis, revealing Magdangal as her peg as an aspiring comedian; child actress Milkcah Wynne Nacion, who aspire to be like Magdangal; Daniel Padilla; and Rita Daniela. In 2017, a parody account Jolegend Slaydangal became an instant hit in the Philippines and produced a number of memes glorifying Magdangal's successes in the showbiz industry and why she is worthy of the title as the country's Queen of Pop.

=== Public image ===
For effectively establishing a “solid name and one that is unblemished with nary a scandal or controversy”, she was acknowledged to be a “true-blue epitome of a role model of the youth [and] pride of the industry”". These public images, together with her career achievements, was seen by entertainment critics as a set of standards of a teen idol to which made her the Teen Queen of the 1990s in the Philippines. As testaments to these claims, she was a recipient of German Moreno Youth Achievement Award, Gintong Kabataan Awards, Youth Role Model Awards, and was even named the first ever National Youth Advocate by the National Youth Commission. In 2005, she received a Serviam Award, a special citation given by the Catholic Mass Media Awards, “[elevating her] as a Paragon of a Socially-Conscious Performing Artist for consistently making herself a model of responsible behavior”.

== Filmography ==
=== Selected films ===
- Ang TV Movie: The Adarna Adventures (1996)
- F.L.A.M.E.S The Movie (1997)
- Adarna: The Mythical Bird (1997)
- Kung Ayaw Mo, Huwag Mo! (1998)
- Labs Kita... Okey Ka Lang? (1998)
- Puso ng Pasko (1998)
- Hey Babe! (1999)
- Tunay na Tunay: Gets Mo? Gets Ko! (2000)
- Kung Ikaw Ay Isang Panaginip (2002)
- Home Alone Da Riber (2002)
- Annie B. (2004)
- Ouija (2007)
- I.T.A.L.Y. (2008)

=== Selected television programs ===
- Ang TV (1992)
- Abangan Ang Susunod Na Kabanata (1993–1997)
- Gimik (1996)
- Labs Ko Si Babe (1999)
- Arriba, Arriba! (2000)
- The Working President (2002)
- FlordeLiza (2015)
- Magandang Buhay (2016–2026)
- Lavender Fields (2024–2025)
- Mommy Guard (2026)

== Discography ==
- A Wish Comes True (1996)
- Jolina (1999)
- On Memory Lane (2000)
- Jolina Sings the Masters (2002)
- Forever Jolina (2004)
- Tuloy Pa Rin Ang Awit (2006)
- Destiny (2008)
- Back to Love (2015)
