= Dominic Ochoa =

Filipino actor (born 1974)

- Born: Jose Madrigal Ochoa; August 4, 1974 (age 52); Pasay, Metro Manila, Philippines
- Occupation: Actor
- Years active: 1996–present
- Agent(s): Star Magic (1996–2022; 2025); GMA Network (1996; 2022–2026); Star Worx (2026–present)
- Notable work: My Super D; Abot-Kamay na Pangarap; Taskforce Firewall; Mommy Guard
- Spouse: Denise Go (m. 2008)
- Children: 1

Jose Madrigal "Dominic" Ochoa (Tagalog pronunciation: [ɔˈtʃowa]; born August 4, 1974) is a Filipino actor. He was a member of ABS-CBN's circle of homegrown talents named Star Magic, as part of the fourth batch. He is managed by Boy Abunda.

Ochoa is best known for his television roles as Michael on the afternoon drama Abot-Kamay na Pangarap (2022–2024), Luis on Mommy Guard, and as Franco on Taskforce Firewall (2026).

== Early life and background ==
Ochoa, was born on August 4, 1974, in Pasay, Metro Manila, Philippines. He is from the prominent Relova family in Pila, Laguna, where his great-grandfather Arcadio was formerly Capital Municipal who built the municipio during his term, grand uncle Lorenzo Relova was formerly Associate Justice of the Supreme Court and another great-granduncle Regino Diaz Relova is a lieutenant colonel in the Katipunan who commanded the Laguna towns of Los Baños, Calauan, Bay and Pila during the Philippine–American War. He is married to businesswoman Denise Go. He is the cousin of actor Mandy Ochoa.

== Acting career ==
Ochoa's first TV appearance was a special guest participation in T.G.I.S. on GMA Network in 1996, then the same year, Ochoa transferred to ABS-CBN for his youth-oriented drama program, Gimik and also his first comedy show with the late Redford White in Super Laff In. Since 2022, he concurrently works with ABS-CBN and GMA Network.

Ochoa has many teleseryes dramas and also a funny sitcom on ABS-CBN and Kapamilya Channel, including his 1st sitcom with the late young matinee idol Rico Yan, actor and chef maker Marvin Agustin, comedian singer dancer Vhong Navarro (replaces the late Rico Yan) in Whattamen formerly aired in 2001 until 2002. Dominic moved back to GMA Network for his comeback teleserye project, Abot-Kamay na Pangarap.

In 2026, Ochoa became affiliated with Star Worx, the rebranded talent management and artist development arm of TV5 headed by his longtime mentor, former Star Magic head Johnny "Mr. M" Manahan. During this period, he also starred in television projects such as Taskforce Firewall and Mommy Guard.

== Other ventures ==
=== Business ===
In the early 2000s, Ochoa partnered with Metro Grind Corporation and the former business partners of his late friend Rico Yan to launch this colorful mini-cone ice cream kiosk chain. Serving as Vice President of Marketing, he helped expand the brand to over 20 outlets across major shopping malls like SM Megamall and SM Mall of Asia.

During the pandemic quarantine, Ochoa converted part of his dining space into a small distribution hub selling fresh farm produce—including Japanese sweet potatoes, mushrooms, lemons, and pomelos—alongside bottled gourmet smoked fish such as chili-infused tinapa and tinapa with mushrooms.

Ochoa serves as a long-time brand ambassador and contract endorser for major Philippine real estate networks, including Filipino Homes and Green Circle Realty.

He is a co-owner of the Pampanga-originated burger chain's branch at BGC Stopover in Bonifacio Global City, which officially celebrated its grand opening in November 2026.

== Acting credits ==
=== Film ===
Key
†	Denotes films that have not yet been released

Dominic Ochoa's film credits with year of release, film titles and roles
Year	Title	Role	Ref.
1997	Home Along Da Riles 2	Manny	
1998	Kung Ayaw Mo, Huwag Mo!	Chuck	
1999	Gimik: The Reunion	The Taxi Driver	
1999	Hey Babe!	Jim	
2000	Tanging Yaman	Joel	
2001	Taxi ni Pilo		
2002	Got 2 Believe	Perry	
2002	Forevermore	Young Alejandro	
2002	Jologs	Iñigo	
2002	9 Mornings	Hernan Lorayes	
2003	Kung Ako Na Lang Sana	Jaime	
2003	My First Romance	Jojo	
2005	D' Anothers	Nick	
2007	Angels	Egay	
2007	My Kuya's Wedding	Divo	
2007	Sakal, Sakali, Saklolo	Kenneth	
2008	Love Me Again (Land Down Under)	Migo's brother	
2010	Sa 'yo Lamang	Father Eric	
2011	Wedding Tayo, Wedding Hindi	Attorney Moises	
2012	Every Breath U Take	Chief / Leo's Brother	
2013	Pagpag: Siyam na Buhay	Cedric's Father	
2014	Da Possessed	Arnel Ignacio Jr.	
2014	The Gifted	Aica's Father	
2015	The Prenup	Edgar Cayabyab	
2015	Haunted Mansion	Father Anthony	
2018	My Fairy Tail Love Story	Robert Quejada	
2018	Sin Island	Oliver Santiago	
2020	Boyette: Not a Girl Yet	Alfred	
2020	Four Sisters Before the Wedding	Caloy Salazar	
2024	Fruit Cake	Sen. Sammy Esteban	
2024	A Thousand Forests	Bani Gualberto	
2025	Ex Ex Lovers	Andres	

=== Television ===
Key
†	Denotes shows that have not yet been aired

Dominic Ochoa's television credits with year of release, title(s) and role
Year	Title	Role	Ref.
1996	T.G.I.S.	Himself	
1996–1999	Gimik	Eric Abesamis	
1997–1998	Esperanza	Roberto "Robbie" Salgado	
1997–2002; 2026–present	ASAP	Himself – performer / host	
1997	Wansapanataym: I Love You Again and Again and Again	Rene	
1998–1999	Super Laff-In	Himself – various roles	
1998	Wansapanataym: Adonis	Adonis	
1999	Wansapanataym: Kuba Kadabra	Janford	
1999; 2001–2003	Magandang Tanghali Bayan	Himself – host	
1999–2000	Labs Ko Si Babe	Ulysses Angeles	
2000	Star Drama Theater	Various roles	
2000	Sa Bayan...	Himself	
2001	Whattamen	Ernest	
2003	Basta't Kasama Kita	George	
2003	Wansapanataym: Lasenggo		
2003	Wansapanataym: Lilit Bulilit		
2004	Maalaala Mo Kaya	Adult Narciso Santiago	
2004	Wansapanataym: Pest Busters		
2004	It's Chowtime	Himself – host	
2005	Maalaala Mo Kaya: Mariposang Dagat		
2005	'Til Death Do Us Part	Drew	
2006	Komiks: Lightning Rhoda		
2006	Komiks: Bampy	Juan	
2006	Komiks Presents: Da Adventures of Pedro Penduko	Padre Jesus Pio de Asis	
2006	Bituing Walang Ningning	Larry Calma	
2007	Shall We Dance?: The Stars Are Back	Himself – Co-host	
2007	Shall We Dance?: The Celebrity Dance Challenge	Himself – Co-host	
2008	Ligaw Na Bulaklak	Jojo	
2008	Komiks Presents: Mars Ravelo's Varga	Andres	
2008	HushHush	Toby	
2008	Komiks Presents: Dragonna	Bugoy	
2009–2010	May Bukas Pa	Father Jose Guillermo	
2010	Your Song: Love Me, Love You	Staff advertiser	
2010	Maalaala Mo Kaya: Kwintas	Cocoy	
2010	Rosalka	Wilfred Dominguez	
2010	Wansapanataym: Nato De Coco	Nanding	
2010	Maalaala Mo Kaya: Parol	Stalin	
2011	Agimat: Ang Mga Alamat ni Ramon Revilla: Bianong Bulag	Tomas Santiago	
2011	Maalaala Mo Kaya: TV	Enrico "Dindo" Habijan	
2011	Minsan Lang Kita Iibigin	Mr. Matias	
2011	Good Vibes	Nestor Pedroza	
2011	100 Days to Heaven	Bobby Ramirez	
2012	E-Boy	Young Alfredo	
2012	Princess and I	Danillo 'Dinoy' Maghirang	
2012	Toda Max	Johnny	
2012	Wansapanataym: Beauty Is the Beast	Roland	
2012	Maalaala Mo Kaya: Cards	Edwin Yamson	
2013	Maalaala Mo Kaya: Puntod	Raul	
2013	Wanspanataym: Baby Ko ang Daddy Ko	Alex	
2013	May Isang Pangarap	Benjie	
2013	Maalaala Mo Kaya: Box	Dada	
2013	Muling Buksan Ang Puso	Edmund Dela Vega	
2013	Bukas Na Lang Kita Mamahalin	Ramon S. Vilchez	
2013	Maria Mercedes	Manuel Alegre	
2014	Wansapantaym: Enchanted House	Adam Agustin	
2014	Luv U	Nicanor "Nick" Jalbuena	
2014	Maalaala Mo Kaya: Karayom	Jun Tan	
2014	Sana Bukas pa ang Kahapon	Emmanuelle's father	
2014	Ipaglaban Mo: Umasa Ako Sa Hula	Eric Ignacio	
2014	Wansapanataym: Puppy ko si Papi	Douglas	
2015	Maalaala Mo Kaya: Hagdanan	Rodolfo G. Mallari	
2015	Nasaan Ka Nang Kailangan Kita	Young Pancho Macaraeg	
2015	Oh My G!	Santino "Santi" Santiago	
2015	Pasión De Amor	Carlos Suarez	
2016	Maalaala Mo Kaya: Itlog	Benjamin	
2016	My Super D	Rudolfo "Dodong" Aguilar / Super D	
2016	Home Sweetie Home	Alvin	
2016	Maalaala Mo Kaya: Popcorn	Jose	
2016	Maalaala Mo Kaya: Luneta Park	Norberto	
2017	Ipaglaban Mo: Tiwala	Mr. Cruz	
2017	Ikaw Lang ang Iibigin	Joselito "Joey" Agbayani Sr.	
2017–2020	Dok, Ricky Pedia	Dr. Ricky Pedia	
2018–2019	Ngayon at Kailanman	Abel Dimaguiba	
2019	The Killer Bride	Javier Dela Cuesta	
2019	Maalaala Mo Kaya: Contest	Roden Dimaranan	
2020	G Diaries	Himself – Co-host	
2020	Love Thy Woman	Simon Cruz	
2020	Oh Mando!	Armando Deputado Sr.	
2021	Hoy, Love You!	Richard	
2021	Saying Goodbye		
2021	Huwag Kang Mangamba	Tomas Estopacio	
2022	2 Good 2 Be True	Young Hugo Agcaoili	
2022	Mars Ravelo's Darna	Javier Toledo / Lindol Man	
2022	Tara, G!	Gov. Miguel Sebastian	
2022–2024	Abot-Kamay na Pangarap	Michael Lobrin	
2022–2026	Family Feud Philippines	Himself – Contestant	
2023	Happy Together	Atty. Pascua	
2024	Chasing in the Wild	Alfred	
2024	Magpakailanman: Tatlo ang Tatay Ko	Chito	
2025	Prinsesa ng City Jail	Raymond Cristobal	
2025	Maalaala Mo Kaya: Habal-habal	Benny	
2025	Sins of the Father	Young Diego Ramirez	
2025	Magpakailanman: My Mother, My Abuser	Cornelio	
2025	Sanggang-Dikit FR	Romeo Espanto	
2026	Sing Galing: SINGlebrity Edition	Himself – Contestant	
2026	The Secrets of Hotel 88	Federico Almazan	
2026	Eat Bulaga!	Himself – The Age is Right Agent	
2026	Taskforce Firewall	Franco Gaston	
2026–present	Mommy Guard	Luis Pascual	

== Accolades ==
Year	Work	Award	Category	Result	Ref.
2000	Labs Ko Si Babe	PMPC Star Awards for Television	Best Drama Actor	Won	
2000	Tanging Yaman	Young Critics Circle	Best Performance by Male or Female, Adult or Child, Individual or Ensemble in Leading or Supporting Role (Note: Shared with the Tanging Yaman cast.)	Won	
2003	"Paper Dolls" – Maalaala Mo Kaya	PMPC Star Awards for Television	Best Single Performance by an Actor	Nominated	
2004	Trip Kita	PMPC Star Awards for Television	Best Reality Competition Program Host	Nominated	
2008	Shall We Dance?	PMPC Star Awards for Television	Best Talent Search Program Host (Note: Shared with Lucy Torres-Gomez and Arnel Ignacio.)	Won	
2011	"TV" – Maalaala Mo Kaya	PMPC Star Awards for Television	Best Single Performance by an Actor	Nominated	
