= Isusumbong Kita sa Tatay Ko... =

1999 action comedy film by Boots Plata

- Theatrical release poster
- Directed by: Boots Plata
- Written by: Dindo Perez
- Produced by: Malou N. Santos
- Starring: Fernando Poe Jr.; Judy Ann Santos
- Cinematography: Ver Reyes
- Edited by: Augusto Salvador
- Music by: Jaime Fabregas
- Production companies: Star Cinema; FPJ Productions
- Distributed by: Star Cinema
- Release date: June 9, 1999
- Running time: 102 minutes
- Country: Philippines
- Language: Filipino
- Box office: ₱100 million

Isusumbong Kita sa Tatay Ko... (transl. I Will Tell My Dad on You...) is a 1999 Philippine action comedy film directed by Boots Plata and starring Fernando Poe Jr. and Judy Ann Santos. The film, produced and distributed by Star Cinema, premiered in the Philippines on June 9, 1999.

The film earned around ₱10 million on the first day of its release. By the end of its run, the film earned more than ₱100 million to become the first Philippine-produced film to have exceeded the ₱100M-mark in box office gross. It is also FPJ's first and only film under Star Cinema.

== Synopsis ==
Badong (FPJ) has been raising up his only child, a daughter named Joey, ever since his wife died at an early age. Consequently, Joey grows up like her father, a boyish person who acts like a man. Together with Lola Benedicta (Anita Linda), Badong and Joey had been living happily, with the former protecting his child while the latter is helping her father with his auto repair shop. One day, Badong's childhood friend, Beth (Aileen Damiles), visits their location and they became close. However, Joey feels that Beth is trying to replace her late mother and destroying her own relationship with her father.

== Cast ==
- Fernando Poe Jr. as Badong Rivera
- Judy Ann Santos as Josephine "Joey" Rivera
- Aileen Damiles as Beth
- Anita Linda as Lola Benedicta
- Paquito Díaz as Sarge
- Kier Legazpí as Archie
- Berting Labra as Mang Cosme
- Leandro Muñoz as Caloy
- Robert Arevalo as Alfredo
- Angel Aquino as Alicia Rivera
- Kathleen Hermosa as Jenny
- Ama Quiambao as Beth's aunt
- Gerald Ejército as Archie's friend
- RG Gutiérrez as Archie's friend
- Gian Achacoso as Archie's friend
- Jaypee Plata as Archie's friend
- Anne Lorraine as Archie's friend
- Sharon Malapitan as Archie's friend
- Lovely Mansueto as Archie's friend
- Mar Garchitorena as Congressman
- Telly Babasa as Market Goon
- Ding Alvaro as Market Goon
- Jhun Melan as Market Goon
- Mack Gomez as Market Goon
- Juan Ramírez as Market Goon
- Dardo de Oro as Market Goon
- Rey Comia as Market Goon
- Bert Garon as Archie's Men
- Ernie Madriaga as Archie's Men
- Boy Dalanon as Archie's Men
- Baby Malanes as Talyer Worker
- Tom Alvarez as Talyer Worker
- Bernie Garcia as Talyer Worker
- Rey Abella as Talyer Worker
- Ed Madriaga as Talyer Worker
- Butch Achacoso as Brgy. Chairman
- Gary Manansala as Kagawad
- Maria Gonzales as Nurse
- Mon Fernandez as Policeman
- Raynald Laranjo as Policeman
- Celso Balte as Policeman
- Tony Gahuman as Policeman
- Polly Cadsawan as Congressman's Bodyguard
- Ali Leal as Painted Man
- Ronnie Paronie as Painted Man
- Raymond Alonzo as Painted Man
- Boy Surposa as Painted Man
- Jun Medraza as Painted Man
- Rey Abella as Painted Man
- Harry Villa as Painted Man
- Eric Fresnido as Painted Man
- Robert Sanchez as Painted Man
- Caloy Alcantara as Guitarist

== Production ==
The production team started filming during the first week of April 1999. During this time, Poe Jr. revealed that his first project with Santos under Star Cinema was first planned in 1997.

However, the team encountered problems with the production fees. Because of substantial cost-cutting over the years, talent fees of the stars/cast had to be reduced.

The film was Muñoz' first film project in the entertainment industry. He was, at the time, the current "Close-Up Boy" and was part of the eighth batch of ABS-CBN's Star Circle. On the other hand, his co-star, Santos, was thrilled to be her partner since they were former schoolmates in real life at Mt. Carmel High School in Quezon City.

== Music ==
The theme song of the film is entitled "Awitin Mo At Isasayaw Ko" (transl. Sing and I'll Dance), which was written by Joey De Leon and Vic Sotto of VST & Co., and performed by the stars Fernando Poe Jr. and Judy Ann Santos. It also features Rey Valera's song "Kung Tayo'y Magkakalayo" (transl. If We'll Ever Be Apart), performed by Valera himself albeit with modified lyrics by Vehnee Saturno to better reflect the movie's theme of father and daughter relationship. Also used in the film was April Boy Regino's "Di Ko Kayang Tanggapin" (transl. I Can't Take It) performed by Leandro Muñoz.

== Reception ==
=== Box-office ===
Isusumbong Kita Sa Tatay Ko marked the first Philippine-produced film to have reached and exceeded ₱100 million in box office gross.

Consequently, the film's box office performance earned both Poe Jr. and Santos the titles "Box Office King and Queen" by the Guillermo Mendoza Memorial Scholarship Foundation.

=== Critical response ===
The film received predominantly favorable reviews besides its commercial success. For instance, Sol Jose Vanzi of the Philippine Headline News Online noted, "It's a match produced in celluloid heaven, because he [Poe Jr.] is [the] king of Philippine movies while she [Santos] is considered today's drama princess."

=== Awards ===
Year	Award-Giving Body	Category	Recipient	Result
2000	GMMSF Box-Office Entertainment Awards	Box-Office King	Fernando Poe Jr.	Won
2000	GMMSF Box-Office Entertainment Awards	Box-Office Queen	Judy Ann Santos	Won

== Planned sequel ==
A few weeks after its release, the production team was already planning for a possible sequel. The following year, plans for the sequel was brought up by Poe a couple of times. He mentioned that a script was being worked on but he was not satisfied with the results, adding that the draft at the time felt forced. The sequel would have carried the title "Magpaalam Ka Muna sa Tatay Ko" and would have featured a different storyline.

Santos then revealed that the sequel would have reunited her with her Gimik leading man, Rico Yan. According to Santos, Poe himself wanted Yan to become part of the sequel.

The plans never came to fruition as Yan died in 2002, followed by Poe himself in 2004.
