= Kung Ayaw Mo, Huwag Mo! =

1998 film by Jerry Lopez Sineneng

- Directed by: Jerry Lopez Sineneng
- Screenplay by: Mel Mendoza-del Rosario; Jerry Lopez Sineneng
- Story by: Mel Mendoza-del Rosario
- Produced by: Malou N. Santos
- Starring: Maricel Soriano; William Martinez; Jolina Magdangal; Marvin Agustin
- Cinematography: Joe Batac
- Edited by: Joyce Bernal
- Music by: Nonong Buencamino
- Production company: Star Cinema
- Release date: February 25, 1998
- Country: Philippines
- Language: Filipino

Kung Ayaw Mo, Huwag Mo! (transl. If you don't want to, then don't!) is a 1998 Filipino romantic comedy-drama film directed by Jerry Lopez Sineneng from a screenplay he co-wrote with Mel Mendoza-del Rosario, who solely wrote the storyline. The film stars Jolina Magdangal and Marvin Agustin in their first full-length film together though they first appeared in Flames: The Movie (Tameme) a year earlier and reunites the love tandem between Maricel Soriano and William Martinez, who were appeared in various dramas and romantic comedies in the 1980s.

Produced and distributed by Star Cinema, the film was theatrically released on February 25, 1998.

== Plot ==
Doris (Soriano) and Ditas (Magdangal) are sisters who share a close bond, but Doris is strict and enforces a rule that Ditas cannot be in a relationship until she finishes her studies. Despite her feelings for her attractive classmate Chuck (Ochoa), Ditas must adhere to this rule. Doris runs a pop-up restaurant with her employees, Badang (Lapus) and Liza (Kimura), and is also a devoted fan of a telenovela featuring characters Pepito and Conchita.

Doris encountered Miko, a student and taxi driver, while fixing the restaurant's electrical issues. After Ditas faced a problem on her way home from school, Doris decided to hire Miko to drive Ditas.

While hanging out at a bar, Doris unexpectedly encounters her ex-boyfriend Mike (Martinez) and inadvertently takes his pager. Miko takes it upon himself to return the pager to Mike. During their conversation, Doris explains her reasons for breaking up with Mike, believing he wasn't the right match for her. However, she later finds herself reminiscing about him. This leads Ditas and Miko to devise a plan to help Doris and Mike reconcile.

During a trip to the resort, Doris was unaware that Mike was also present. She shared with him the reason for their breakup, expressing her concern that he would impede her aspirations for Ditas. Ultimately, they reconciled and rekindled their romantic relationship. Meanwhile, Ditas and Miko also confessed their feelings for each other.

Doris picked Chuck to escort Ditas for her 18th birthday, but Ditas struggled to tell her the truth about their situation. On the night of the party, Chuck's coat got stained, and he had to leave with his mother. Miko stepped in as Ditas' escort, surprising the guests. While at the restroom, Doris overheard Bettina and some classmates discussing Ditas' relationship with Miko, which made her furious. She sent Ditas home and became stricter afterward.

The next morning, Doris saw Miko fixing an electrical wire at her restaurant, which made her furious, aggressive and bossy towards Badang and Liza. Later that day, she picked Ditas up from school late and stopped Miko from going to her restaurant. The next day, Miko told Ditas he was going back to Lucena to escape Doris' anger. When Mike and Doris saw him, she slapped Miko several times. Mike tried to intervene, but Doris wouldn't relent. Frustrated, Ditas decided to run away from home after recalling a pencil case Doris brought for Ditas, where she recalled that what she really wanted is something that is simple and cheap, but Doris insisted on buying the pencil case.

Doris was alone at home in the early evening until Mike arrived and explained that her strictness had caused Ditas to run away. They sought help from Miko, who was leaving for Lucena, to find Ditas. Miko called Bettina, who informed them that Ditas had returned home, but she wasn't there when they arrived. It turned out Ditas had chosen to stay at Doris' restaurant, where a fire broke out due to a faulty electrical wire that Mike cannot fix the other day while she was asleep.

Doris rushed to save Ditas, and they were eventually rescued by Mike and Miko. After the ordeal, Doris and Ditas reconciled and Doris married Mike.

== Cast ==
- Maricel Soriano as Doris Cabantog-Torres
- William Martinez as Mike Torres
- Jolina Magdangal as Ditas Cabantog
- Marvin Agustin as Miko
- Stella Ruiz as Yogi
- Candy Pangilinan as Cris
- John Lapus as Badang
- Mel Kimura as Lisa
- Dominic Ochoa as Chuck
- J.R. Herrera as John
- Kathleen Hermosa as Cathy
- Steven Alonso as Paul
- Rex Tanwangco as Bay
- Derek Carmona as Pangga
- CJ Tolentino as Mark
- Jimson Oropesa as Tyrone
- Dimples Romana as Bettina
- Marcus Madrigal as Steven

== Production ==
The film was initially entitled "Pag-Ibig Mo, Pag-Ibig Ko".

=== Casting ===
This is Jolina Magdangal's second film collaboration with versatile actress Maricel Soriano, the first was Ama, Ina, Anak, which was released two years prior. According to Magdangal, her casting alongside Soriano is a dream come true especially that, aside from being a fan, Soriano was a big influence in her acting career.

== Soundtrack ==
An accompanying soundtrack album was also released in the same year by Star Music. Most notable tracks on the album were "Kung Ayaw Mo, Huwag Mo" by Rivermaya, originally included in their Atomic Bomb album from BMG Records (Pilipinas); "Tulak Ng Bibig, Kabig ng Dibdib", a cover of the Cinderella-original by Jolina Magdangal; "TL Ako sa Iyo", a duet of Magdangal and Marvin Agustin which Magdangal re-recorded for her sophomore album Jolina (1999).

Kung Ayaw Mo, Huwag Mo! Original Soundtrack

Soundtrack album by Various artists
- Released: 1998
- Genres: OPM, Pop, Rock
- Label: Star Records

Singles from Kung Ayaw Mo, Huwag Mo! Original Soundtrack
- 1. "Kung Ayaw Mo, Huwag Mo"; 2. "TL Ako sa Iyo"

=== Track listing ===
Taken from the Kung Ayaw Mo, Huwag Mo (Original Soundtrack) liner notes.

No.	Title	Writer(s)	Length
1.	"Kung Ayaw Mo, Huwag Mo*" (Recorded by Rivermaya)	Rico Blanco	3:49
2.	"I Love You Girl" (Recorded by Richard Marten)	Tito Cayamanda and Vehnee Saturno	4:08
3.	"Feeling Heaven Ka Na Ba?" (Recorded by Jolina Magdangal)	Nonong Buencamino	4:05
4.	"May Nasisilungan Ako" (Recorded by Maricel Soriano and Jolina Magdangal)	Nonong Buencamino	4:20
5.	"Tulak Ng Bibig, Kabig ng Dibdib" (Recorded by Jolina Magdangal)	Rodolfo Ongpauco	3:38
6.	"TL Ako sa Iyo" (Recorded by Jolina Magdangal and Marvin Agustin)	Joey De Leon and Roberto Rigor	3:52
7.	"No Touch" (Recorded by ASAP E-Males)	Mike Hanapol	2:37
8.	"Kumusta Ka" (Recorded by Rocky Lazatin)	Rey Valera	4:39
9.	"Aalis Ka Ba? (Crying Time)" (Recorded by Rocky Lazatin)	Vehnee Saturno	3:14
10.	"Minsan Pa (Besa Me Mucho)" (Recorded by Luisa Sta. Maria)	Sunny Ilacad	4:12
