= I.T.A.L.Y. (I Trust and Love You) =

2008 Filipino romantic comedy film

- Directed by: Mark A. Reyes V
- Written by: Senedy Que
- Produced by: Jose Mari Abacan
- Starring: Jolina Magdangal; Dennis Trillo; Rufa Mae Quinto
- Cinematography: Jay Linao
- Edited by: Marya Ignacio
- Music by: Vincent A. de Jesus
- Production companies: GMA Films; Video King
- Distributed by: GMA Films
- Release date: August 6, 2008
- Running time: 95 minutes
- Countries: Philippines; Italy
- Languages: Filipino; English; Italian
- Box office: ₱103.7 million

I.T.A.L.Y. (I Trust and Love You) is a 2008 Philippine romantic comedy film directed by Mark A. Reyes. It stars Jolina Magdangal, Dennis Trillo and Rufa Mae Quinto. The film was filmed in three different continents: Asia, Europe and Africa.

The film was slated to be released in Europe on the same day of its Philippine premiere of August 6, 2008, but was moved to September 17, 2008. It earned ₱13.2 million on its opening week., while its total theatrical gross is ₱103,709,311.00 million.

== Plot ==
Six people are brought together on a seven-day cruise that will change their lives forever:

- A hopeless romantic (Jolina Magdangal) searches for the right man for her, while dreaming of becoming a singer.
- A successful businessman (Dennis Trillo) searches for the truth about a woman from his past.
- A senior housekeeper (Eugene Domingo) finds out that it is never too late to find true love.
- A young waiter (Mark Herras) finds the woman of his dreams, but she is beyond his reach.
- A young brat (Rhian Ramos) finds out that love does not have to be as complicated as her love-hate relationship with her mother.
- And a sexy lounge singer (Rufa Mae Quinto) searches for the perfect man who will keep his promises and who will never leave her.

== Cast and characters ==
- Jolina Magdangal as Destiny Pinlac
- Rufa Mae Quinto as Stella Sembrano
- Dennis Trillo as Paolo Guzman
- Eugene Domingo as Lovely Mercado
- Mark Herras as Nathan Reyes
- Rhian Ramos as Phoebe Villaroso
- Marvin Agustin as Patrick
- Antonello Annunziata as Captain Frank
- Andrea Delogu as Sofia
- Ida Henares as Elena Villaroso
- Pen Medina as Gary Pinlac, Destiny's father
- Chariz Solomon as Crissy "Charing"
- Aljur Abrenica as Budoy Pinlac
- Edgar Allan Guzman as Gadoy Pinlac, Destiny's brother
- Joaqui Valdes as Larry Shortfall, Destiny's brother
- Bebong Muñoz as ship doctor
- Edgar Llarosa as Hander
- Tracie Mandalog as Hannah

== Release ==
The final gross of I.T.A.L.Y. is ₱94,730,311.00 according to Box Office Mojo.

=== Home media ===
The series was released onto DVD-format and VCD-format by Viva Video. The DVD contained the movie plus bonus features like the music video of "Will of the Wind" plus the full-length trailer of the film. The DVD/VCD was released in 2008.
