= Minsan, Minahal Kita =

2000 romantic drama film by Olivia M. Lamasan

- Directed by: Olivia M. Lamasan
- Written by: Ricky Lee; Olivia M. Lamasan
- Produced by: Malou N. Santos
- Starring: Sharon Cuneta; Richard Gomez
- Cinematography: Shayne Sarte-Clemente
- Edited by: George Jarlego
- Music by: Archie Castillo
- Production company: Star Cinema
- Distributed by: Star Cinema
- Release date: 23 February 2000
- Running time: 117 minutes
- Country: Philippines
- Language: Filipino

Minsan, Minahal Kita (English: Sometimes, I Loved You) is a 2000 Philippine romantic drama film directed by Olivia M. Lamasan from a story and screenplay she co-wrote with Ricky Lee. Starring Sharon Cuneta and Richard Gomez in their fifth film together as romantic leads, the story follows the two people who met each other at a blind date and fell in love, though they have troubled marriages to their respective spouses. It also features Angel Aquino, Rosemarie Gil, Sandra Gomez, Edu Manzano, Ciara Sotto, and Carmina Villarroel while Marvin Agustin and Kristine Hermosa in special participatory roles.

Produced and distributed by Star Cinema, the film was theatrically released on 23 February 2000, as its Valentine's season offering. It received positive reviews from critics and was a box-office success. In 2014, the film was digitally restored and remastered by ABS-CBN Film Restoration, in partnership with Central Digital Lab, and received a limited theatrical release in February 2016.

== Plot ==
In 1986, two people, Dianne Nepomuceno, a seminar consultant, and Albert Simon, a real estate contractor, met each other unexpectedly at a blind date. Some meetings later, their friendship blossomed into a romance despite their respective marriages becoming unhappy and troublesome. Three years later, this romantic affair came to an end when Dianne's half-sister, Mary Ann, caught them, and Dianne was angered by her mother, Chona. Albert, who insisted on not ending their romance, convinced Dianne to join him in the United States. However, Dianne was devastated when Albert decided to stay after his unhappy wife, Menchu, pleaded with him to give their marriage another chance.

== Cast ==
- Sharon Cuneta as Dianne Nepomuceno: A seminar consultant at a business consultancy company.
- Richard Gomez as Albert Simon: A real estate contractor.
- Carmina Villarroel as Jackie: Dianne's lesbian half-sister
- Edu Manzano as Louie Nepomuceno: Dianne's husband who works as an airline pilot.
- Angel Aquino as Menchu Simon: Albert's unhappy wife
- Marvin Agustin as Angelo "Gelo" Nepomuceno: Dianne and Louie's son
  - Carl Brian Ravanes as younger Gelo
- Kristine Hermosa as Pia Simon: Albert and Menchu's daughter
  - Stephanie Nicole Bates as young Pia
- Ciara Sotto as Mary Ann: Dianne's other half-sister
- Rosemarie Gil as Chona: The mother of Dianne, Jackie, and Mary Ann.
- Sandra Gomez as Trina: Louie's mistress who is a flight attendant.
- Ama Quiambao

== Reception ==
=== Box office ===
On its first and opening day of theatrical showing, the film earned ₱10 million.

=== Critical response ===
Initial

Leah Salterio, writing for Philippine Daily Inquirer, gave a mixed-to-positive review of the film, with praise for the Sharon-Richard tandem, which was credited with its box office success and drew large audiences; Olivia Lamasan's direction, which evoked the audience's emotions; the acting performances of the supporting cast, including Edu as an evil husband, Angel Aquino as a problematic wife, and Carmina Villarroel's half-sister role; and the soundtracks used in the film. However, the criticism is directed towards its formulaic plot, Ciara Sotto being underutilized (which she wished she had been "given more lines"), fashion errors, and visual inconsistencies, such as the scene where Dianne's son Gelo remained the same age after four years had passed.

Retrospective

Abigail Manaluz, writing for Sinegang PH, gave the film 4 out of 5 stars and commended the acting and chemistry of the Sharon-Richard duo, emphasizing their ability to portray a range of characters, from secret lovers to dejected people. She also commended Olivia Lamasan and Ricky Lee for their individual contributions, which highlighted the direction in developing sympathetic lead characters, the tonal transitions, and, lastly, serving the film as a commentary on the double standards surrounding marital infidelity.

=== Accolades ===
Award-giving organization	Date of ceremony	Category	Recipient(s)	Result	Ref.
19th Luna Awards	5 May 2001	Best Director	Olivia M. Lamasan	Nominated	
19th Luna Awards	5 May 2001	Best Screenplay	Ricky Lee and Olivia M. Lamasan (Minsan, Minahal Kita)	Nominated	
19th Luna Awards	5 May 2001	Best Cinematographer	Shayne Sarte-Clemente	Nominated	
