= Angels (2007 film) =

2007 Filipino trilogy film

- Directed by: Gina Alajar (segment "Angel of Mine"); Jose Dantes III (segment "Daddy's Angel"); Mark Reyes (segment "Angel of Love")
- Screenplay by: Gina Marissa Tagasa-Gil (segments "Daddy's Angel" and "Angel of Love"); Agnes de Guzman (segments "Daddy's Angel")
- Story by: Rebecca Aguila (segment "Daddy's Angel"); Gina Marissa Tagasa-Gil (segments "Angel of Love" and "Angel of Love")
- Produced by: Angelica Colmenares; Becky Aguila
- Starring: Angel Locsin; Jennylyn Mercado; Patrick Garcia; Marvin Agustin
- Cinematography: Armin Collado (segment "Daddy's Angel"); Pao Orendain (segment "Daddy's Angel"); Nap Jamir (segment "Angel of Mine")
- Edited by: Aleks Castañeda (segment "Angel of Love"); Jason Cauman (segment "Daddy's Angel"); Miren Fabregas (segment "Angel of Mine"); Jay Halili (segment "Daddy's Angel"); Ian Hontanosas (segment "Angel of Mine")
- Production company: Eagle Eye Entertainment Productions
- Release date: June 20, 2007
- Running time: 127 minutes
- Country: Philippines
- Languages: Filipino; English
- Box office: ₱6.37 million

Angels is a 2007 Filipino trilogy film directed by Gina Alajar and starring Angel Locsin, Jennylyn Mercado, Patrick Garcia, and Marvin Agustin.

== Plot ==
Angels is a trilogy. The three episodes featured in the film are: "Angel of Mine", "Daddy's Angel" and "Angel of Love". "Angel of Mine," directed by Gina Alajar, features a career woman forced to attend to a child left by this problematic mother.

"Daddy's Angel" follows the bitter father-and-son relationship between a (dying) ex-convict and ann affectionate young boy who bears the miserable stigmas of a brutal past. A young man is imprisoned for killing a close friend who raped his wife on their wedding day. While in prison, his wife becomes pregnant and gives birth to the angelic boy. The wife dies before his sentence is completed. In "Angel of Love", Bianang, a frustrated musician, is caught in a tangle of family concerns. Orphaned by her mother and abandoned by her father, she is left to look after her two younger siblings and provide for their needs by finding her niche in the music industry. By a twist of fate, guided by Kerubina, her path crosses with Jude, a man from a matriarchal clan of aristocrats who is battling the repercussions of ending a heavily burdened relationship.

== Cast ==
=== Episode One: Angel of Mine ===
- Angel Locsin as Angie
- Eunice Lagusad as Gelay
- Pinky Amador as Ditas
- Malou de Guzman as Senyang
- Ketchup Eusebio as Cacho
- Malou Crisologo as Lefty

=== Episode Two: Daddy's Angel ===
- Marvin Agustin as Ruben
- Valerie Concepcion as Lennie
- Nash Aguas as Angelo
- Jaclyn Jose as Celia
- Dominic Ochoa as Egay
- Paolo Paraiso as Anton

=== Episode Three: Angels of Love ===
- Jennylyn Mercado as Bianang
- Patrick Garcia as Jude
- Ella Cruz as Kerubina
- Nico Antonio as Barkada
- Boots Anson-Roa as Conching
- Allan Paule as Nanding
- Empress Schuck as Nina
- Marco Alcaraz as Acid
- Karel Marquez as Tracy
- Ian Veneracion as Paul
- Roman Solito as Ben
