= Tunay na Tunay: Gets Mo? Gets Ko! =

2000 film by Joyce Bernal

Tunay Na Tunay: Gets Mo? Gets Ko!
- Theatrical poster
- Directed by: Joyce Bernal
- Written by: Dindo Perez; Mari Mariano
- Produced by: Malou N. Santos
- Starring: Robin Padilla; Jolina Magdangal
- Cinematography: Charlie Peralta
- Edited by: Joyce Bernal
- Music by: Nonong Buencamino
- Production company: Star Cinema
- Distributed by: Star Cinema
- Release date: March 15, 2000
- Running time: 106 minutes
- Country: Philippines
- Languages: Filipino; Chinese

Tunay Na Tunay: Gets Mo? Gets Ko! (English: Very Real: Get It? I Get It!) is a 2000 Filipino action and romantic comedy film edited and directed by Joyce Bernal. It stars Robin Padilla and Jolina Magdangal. It is also Magdangal's first and only action film to date.

Produced by Star Cinema, the film was released on March 15, 2000.

== Synopsis ==
Nick (Robin Padilla) is an undercover police officer who is in a mission that gone hay-wired when his cover was blown. In his attempt for survival, he stumbled upon a restaurant owned by a Chinese businessman where he met Tin Tin (Jolina Magdangal), a Chinese waitress. To remain inconspicuous from the bad cops and the syndicate he is pursuing, Nick kept a low profile by accepting the offer of the Chinese businessman to work for him as a cook, and later accepted a small task from another Chinese businessman, Mr. Li (Roldan Aquino), to search for the latter's missing daughter, Mei Ling (also Jolina Magdangal).

Nick later discovers that Mei Ling is hiding by the name Tin Tin to escape a marriage her father has arranged with the son of another Chinese businessman Mr. Wong (Vic Diaz), who turns out to be the head of the syndicate Nick is pursuing in his earlier mission.

== Cast ==
=== Main ===
- Robin Padilla as Nicanor "Nick" Abeleda /Ramon/Edgar/Abner
- Jolina Magdangal as Tin Tin/Mei Ling

=== Supporting ===
- Vic Diaz as Mr. Wong
- Efren Reyes as Don Julio
- Roldan Aquino as Mr. Li
- Dindo Arroyo as Kaliwete
- Bearwin Meily as Dick
- J.R. Herrera as Empoy
- Via Veloso as Beth
- Dang Cruz as Edith
- Levi Ignacio as Chung Lao

== Reception ==
The film was critically and commercially successful and was one of Star Cinema's box-office films for the year 2000. It held the record as the highest-grossing Filipino film for the year 2000 for a short time until Minsan, Minahal Kita, and thereafter Anak, were released later that year. For the film's box office success, Robin Padilla received the "Box Office King of Philippine Movies" award, and Jolina Magdangal for "Princess of RP Movies" award in the 30th Box Office Entertainment Awards.

== Soundtrack ==
- Mahal Ka sa Akin
  - Composer: Vehnee Saturno
  - Arranger: Dennis Quila
  - Performer: Jolina Magdangal (originally performed by Tootsie Guevara)
