= Marvin Agustin =

Filipino actor and entrepreneur

- Born: Marvin Jay Marquez Cuyugan; January 29, 1979 (age 47); Paco, Manila, Philippines
- Other name: MJ
- Education: CAP College Foundation
- Occupations: Actor, chef, host, businessman-entrepreneur, concert producer, TV director
- Years active: 1994–present
- Agents: Star Magic (1996–2005; 2014–2017; 2021–present); GMA Artist Center (2005–2012; 2017–2021); Talent5 (now Star Worx and MQuest Ventures) (2012–2014; 2026-present); ALV Talent Circuit (2017–present); Viva Artists Agency (2006–present)
- Height: 5 ft 8 in (173 cm)
- Website: Official website

Marvin Jay Marquez Cuyugan (born January 29, 1979), known professionally as Marvin Agustin, is a Filipino actor, chef and entrepreneur.

== Early life and education ==
Marvin Jay Marquez Cuyugan was born on January 29, 1979, in Paco, Metro Manila. He is the youngest and only son of Theresa and Danilo Cuyugan and has two older sisters. His father worked as a lineman for the Philippine Long Distance Telephone Company (PLDT), while his mother was a homemaker.

During his childhood, his father was convicted in a drug-related case and imprisoned. As the only male child, Agustin helped support his family alongside his mother and older sisters, assisting in household work and small-scale food sales.

At age 16, Agustin began working at the Tia Maria bar-restaurant, performing various roles including waiter, bartender, kitchen staff, cashier, and marketing. During this time, he was scouted for acting but initially declined, wishing to continue his studies and pursue a career in restaurant management. He also noted that neither he nor his family had a background in the arts. He later accepted the offer and made his television debut in the ABS-CBN series Gimik.

Agustin completed his high school education at Sta. Rita College in Parañaque. He later enrolled in short‑course and diploma programs, including culinary arts and hotel management at the International School for Culinary Arts and Hotel Management, though he did not complete the program. In 2016, he finished a short course in digital filmmaking at the New York University School of Professional Studies.

== Career ==
At age 16, Agustin was working at the Tia Maria bar-restaurant when he was scouted by ABS-CBN's Talent Center (now Star Magic). He initially declined the offer, preferring to balance his studies with work, but eventually accepted and made his television debut in the teen drama series Gimik (1996), where he was first paired with Jolina Magdangal, forming one of the era's most popular love teams.

Following his television debut, Agustin appeared in a series of projects, including soap opera Esperanza (1997–1999) and Sa Sandaling Kailangan Mo Ako (1998). He reunited with Magdangal in the romantic-comedy series Labs Ko Si Babe (1999–2000), regarded as the Philippines’ first romantic-comedy television series.

Agustin also starred in a series of films, including Tanging Yaman (2000) and Dekada '70 (2002), earning recognition for his versatility in both drama and comedy roles.

After Labs Ko Si Babe ended in 2000, Agustin became part of the trio Whattamen with his close friends Dominic Ochoa and Rico Yan. The trio served as replacement hosts for Willie Revillame on the noontime show Magandang Tanghali Bayan from 2001 to 2003. In 2001, they also starred in the sitcom Whattamen, which ran until 2004, even after Yan's death in 2002.

Agustin received his first film acting award, Best Actor— for his role as Lemuel in the horror‑thriller Kutob at the 31st Metro Manila Film Festival.

In 2005, Agustin transferred to GMA Network and reunited with Magdangal in the hosts of Bubble Gang Jr. and the series I Luv NY. In 2007, he became an exclusive talent to the network and took on his first antagonist role in the action series Asian Treasures. After his role in Marimar (2007) as the antagonist Rodolfo Sta. Ginez, Agustin portrayed the hunchback Gabriel in Mga Mata ni Anghelita (2007). He later joined the cast of Babangon Ako’t Dudurugin Kita (2008) as an antagonist and subsequently appeared as one of the villains in LaLola (2009).

Agustin also hosted the musical‑variety show SOP Rules and the youth‑oriented drama anthology Dear Friend on GMA Network. He also hosted the comedy informative show, Outrageous & Courageous. Agustin was also part of the drama mini‑series SRO Cinemaserye: Ganti Ng Puso (2009) as Jacob Manansala.

In 2009, Agustin starred in the romantic-comedy series Adik Sa'Yo alongside Magdangal. He later appeared as Lando in the drama mini-series Tinik Sa Dibdib (2009–2010). He also played the villainous Lizardo in the children's action‑fantasy show Panday Kids. Among his hosting credits, he was formerly a co‑host of the variety show Party Pilipinas. Agustin also appeared in the television series, Pilyang Kerubin and Beauty Queen. Later that year, he portrayed the role of Anton Marco in the drama series, Iglot.

In 2012, Agustin transferred signed a two-year contract with TV5's talent agency arm Talent5 (now Star Worx).

In October 2014, Agustin returned to ABS‑CBN, reuniting with Magdangal in the drama series Flordeliza. In 2017, Agustin returned to GMA Network and signed an exclusive contract to star in the primetime drama Kambal, Karibal.

== Other ventures ==
=== Business ===
Agustin is involved in numerous restaurant businesses. In 1999, as part of an endorsement deal, he received a franchise outlet of Mister Donut, marking his first business venture. He subsequently launched Ricecapades, a chain of rice-based food stalls, which became his first entrepreneurial foray into the restaurant industry.

Agustin later established Oyster Boy Restaurant, a seafood-dining concept that expanded to multiple branches in Metro Manila. In December 2005, he co-founded Sumo Sam, a Japanese–American casual dining chain, with its first outlet at Shangri-La Plaza Mall in Mandaluyong. He also holds co-ownership stakes in several other restaurants, including John & Yoko, Café Ten Titas, Marciano's, and Samurai Chef.

Agustin co-founded Oh Crop! in 2021, a social enterprise focused on promoting adlai— a locally grown Philippine grain, by partnering with farmers to improve their income and highlight underutilized local crops.

In 2023, Agustin launched Cochi Bistro, a fine‑dining concept in Bonifacio Global City that centers on roasted suckling pig (cochinillo) prepared in a Spanish style and paired with modern Filipino and international dishes. The concept traces its roots to his cloud‑kitchen brand Secret Kitchen, which opened a mall stall for cochinillo and baked goods in 2022. He described the venture as a pandemic‑pivot inspired by his in‑garage baking experiments while developing his oven‑based cooking. In 2025, Agustin's Cochi was awarded a Bib Gourmand by the Michelin Guide Philippines. Agustin opened a second Cochi branch in Eastwood City, however he and his team later rebranded the branch in 2024 into a new restaurant, Mr. Monk, which serves contemporary Chinese food, primarily dim sum and roasts.

Aside from his food ventures, Agustin owns Futuretainment Inc., a company specializing in the production of concerts and live events. The company has produced shows for both local and international artists and expanded into television content, including the singing competition Kanta Pilipinas on TV5.

=== Philanthropy and advocacy ===
In a 2000 interview, Agustin stated that he had established the small foundation Kaibigan ni Marvin Agustin Inc. (KAMAI), which operated for two years. Its early activities included visits to Golden Acres to interact with the elderly and a birthday‑party outreach for street children.

In 2012, he organized a birthday-party outreach for children from Operation Smile Philippines at Enchanted Kingdom, providing food and presents during the event. The following year, Agustin expressed his intention to organize a volunteer group for relief operations following Typhoon Yolanda. He also supported a children's character‑building campaign by Bear Brand, emphasizing the importance of teaching children resilience and leadership skills in 2014.

In 2016, Agustin established the Entreplab School, a senior high school focused on entrepreneurship education.

During the COVID-19 pandemic in 2020, Agustin urged restaurant owners to donate food to hospitals and frontline workers, suggesting that perishable stock be cooked and given to those in need. He offered his restaurant kitchens to support a fundraiser for street vendors affected by the pandemic, organized by Bela Padilla. In 2021, he marked August 10 with a food distribution event for community members, playfully referencing the meme connecting his surname with the date.

In 2022, Agustin was appointed as an agri-aqua ambassador by the Department of Science and Technology – Philippine Council for Agriculture, Aquatic and Natural Resources Research and Development (DOST‑PCAARRD), promoting agricultural and aquaculture awareness and education. In this role, he creates content, shares information about native agricultural commodities, and highlights the use of local produce to benefit farmers, business owners, and consumers.

In 2025, Agustin served as ambassador of WorldSkills Philippines. He also took part in ABS-CBN Foundation's Kapamilya Golf Fundraiser, Swing for a Cause.

=== Endorsements ===
Agustin has endorsed numerous products throughout his career, ranging from food and beverage brands to personal care and household items. In the late 1990s, he served as brand ambassador for Mister Donut, a partnership that earned him his own franchise. In 2008, he signed endorsement contracts with clothing brand Urban Edge and Lana de Herba Oil and Ointment. He has also promoted products such as Del Monte and Tupperware. In 2012, he was named a celebrity ambassador for Knorr cubes and later that year became an endorser for CarbTrim.

== Personal life ==
Agustin practiced archery in hopes of making it to the 2010 Asian Games in Guangzhou, China in November 2010.

In a 2012 interview, Agustin stated that he had no plans to pursue a career in politics.

He is the cousin of Jay Agustin.

== Filmography ==
=== Film ===
Key
†	Denotes films that have not yet been released

Year	Title	Role	Notes
1997	Ipaglaban Mo 2: The Movie	Paul	
1997	FLAMES: The Movie	Butch	
1997	Adarna: The Mythical Bird	Ramir	
1998	Magandang Hatinggabi	Frankie	
1998	Kung Ayaw Mo, Huwag Mo!	Nicco	
1998	Labs Kita... Okey Ka Lang?	Ned	
1999	GIMIK: The Reunion	Joey Fajardo	
1999	Hey Babe!	Nelson	
1999	Esperanza: The Movie	Danilo/Raphael Salgado	
2000	Minsan, Minahal Kita	Gelo	
2000	Tanging Yaman	Boyet	2000 Metro Manila Film Festival entry
2001	Trip	Joboy	
2002	Super B	Lordino	
2002	Dekada '70	Emmanuel "Em" Bartolome	
2003	Ang Tanging Ina	Juan Montecilio	
2003	Noon at Ngayon: Pagsasamang Kay Ganda	Bobby	
2003	Malikmata	Patrick	
2004	Spirit of the Glass	Dante	
2005	Maging Akin Muli	Fr. Christopher "Jun" Santos Jr.	
2005	Kutob	Lemuel	
2006	Oh, My Ghost!	Alvin	
2006	Wag Kang Lilingon	James	
2007	Angels	Ruben	
2008	I.T.A.L.Y. (I Trust And I Love You)	Patrick (cameo)	
2010	The Red Shoes	Lucas Munozca	
2010	Ang Tanging Ina Mo (Last na 'To!)	Juan Montecilio	
2011	Who's That Girl	Fish ball vendor (cameo)	
2011	Kasambuhay Habambuhay	Michael	
2011	The Road	Pedro	
2011	Patikul	Sir Michael Balmas	
2011	Ikaw ang Pag-ibig	Father Johnny	
2011	Enteng ng Ina Mo	Juan Montecilio	
2012	Moron 5 and the Crying Lady	Aristotle Ramos	
2012	Kimmy Dora and the Temple of Kiyeme	Dr. Jose Rizal	
2013	Ang Huling Henya	Lee	
2014	Moron 5.2: The Transformation	Aristotle Ramos	
2019	Second Coming	Paolo Trinidad	
2021	Momshies! Ang Soul Mo'y Akin!	Wally	Voice role
2024	Bansa		
2025	Ex Ex Lovers	Ced	Also executive producer

=== Television ===
Year	Title	Role	Note
1996–1999	Gimik	Joey Fajardo	Main role
1996	Maalaala Mo Kaya	Elmer	Episode: "Karayom"
1997–1999	Esperanza	Danilo / Raphael Salgado	Main role
1997	Onli in Da Pilipins	Gordon	Supporting role
1998	Ipaglaban Mo!	Pido	Episode: "Balon"
1998–1999	Sa Sandaling Kailangan Mo Ako	Ruben	Main role
1999–2000	Labs Ko Si Babe	Wally	Main role
2001–2004	Whattamen	Matti	Supporting role
2001–2003	Magandang Tanghali Bayan	Himself	Co-host
2003–2005	Ang Tanging Ina	Juan	Main role
2003–2004	Sana'y Wala Nang Wakas	Newton	Supporting role
2004–2005	EK Channel	Himself	Host
2004	Maalaala Mo Kaya	Rolando Navarette	Episode: "Boxing Gloves"
2005	Maalaala Mo Kaya	Himself	Episode: "Mascot"
2005	M.R.S. (Most Requested Show)	Himself	Co-host
2005	StarDance	Himself	Host
2005	Bubble Gang Jr.	Himself	together with Jolina Magdangal
2006	I Luv NY	Albert Sandoval	Main Role / Protagonist
2007	Asian Treasures	Hector Madrigal	Supporting Role / Antagonist
2007	Mga Mata ni Anghelita	Gabriel / Angelo / Kuba	Supporting Role
2007–2008	Marimar	Rodolfo San Jinez	Supporting Role / Antagonist
2008	Babangon Ako't Dudurugin Kita	Alfred de Leon	Main Role / Antagonist
2008	Sine Novela: Gaano Kadalas ang Minsan	Dr. Louie Almeda	Main Role
2008	Chef to Go (Season 2)	Host	
2008–2010	Dear Friend	Host	Main Role
2008–2009	LaLola	Gaston Savictorres	Supporting Role / Antagonist
2008	Maynila	Various role	
2009–2010	SOP Rules	Himself	Co-host/Performer
2009	Outrageous & Courageous	Himself	Host
2009	SRO Cinemaserye: Ganti	Jacob Manansala	Main Role / Antagonist
2009	Adik Sa'Yo	Carlos Manansala	Main Role
2009–2010	Sine Novela: Tinik sa Dibdib	Lando Domingo	Main Role
2010	Panday Kids	Lizardo/Enrico	Supporting Role / Antagonist
2010	Party Pilipinas	Himself	Co-host/Performer
2010	Pilyang Kerubin	Adante	Guest Role
2010–2011	Beauty Queen	Donald Cervantes	Supporting Role / Antagonist
2011	Kitchen Superstar	Himself	Host
2011	Iglot	Anton Marco	Main Role
2012	Artista Academy	Himself	Host with Cesar Montano
2012	Wil Time Bigtime	Himself / Guest Host	Pinch-hitter for Willie Revillame
2013	Karinderya Wars	Chef Marvin (Himself)	Host
2014	Obsession	Ramon Mendoza	Main Role / Antagonist
2015	FlordeLiza	Capt. Crisanto Maristella	Main Role / Protagonist
2016	Wansapanataym: Susi Ni Sisay	Henry	Episode role
2016	Maalaala Mo Kaya: Toothbrush	Sec. Jesse Robredo	Episode role
2016	My Super D	Anthony "Tony" Yaneza / New Zulu	Supervillain
2017	Ipaglaban Mo!: Seaman	Jess	Episode role
2017	Maalaala Mo Kaya: Tulay	Benj	Episode role
2017–2018	Kambal, Karibal	Raymond De Villa / Samuel Calderon	Supporting Role / Antagonist (as Raymond) / Protagonist (as Samuel)
2017	Sunday PinaSaya	Himself	Special guest
2017	Sarap Diva	Himself	Special guest
2018	Magpakailanman: Wilodia Story	—N/a	Directorial Debut (Director)
2019	Inagaw na Bituin	Eduard Sevilla	Supporting Role
2020	Paano Kita Mapasasalamatan	Himself	Special guest
2025	It's Showtime	Himself	Special guest
2026	Mommy Guard	Pio Areola	Main role

== Accolades ==
Awards and NominationsAwards and nominations received by Marvin Agustin
Award	Year	Category	Nominated work	Result	Ref.
Eastwood City Walk Of Fame	2011	Celebrity Inductee	—N/a	Honored	
FAMAS Award	1999	German Moreno Youth Achievement Award	—N/a	Won	
FAMAS Award	2004	Best Supporting Actor	Ang Tanging Ina	Nominated	
FAMAS Award	2006	Best Actor	Kutob	Nominated	
FAMAS Award	2012	Best Supporting Actor	The Road	Nominated	
Gawad Urian Awards	2012	Best Supporting Actor (Pinakamahusay na Pangalawang Aktor)	Patikul	Nominated	
Golden Screen Awards	2012	Best Performance by an Actor in a Supporting Role (Drama, Musical or Comedy)	Ikaw ang Pag-ibig	Nominated	
Golden Screen TV Awards	2004	Best Single Performance by a Lead Actor	Maalaala Mo Kaya: "Boxing Gloves"	Won	
Luna Awards	2006	Best Actor	Kutob	Won	
Metro Manila Film Festival	2005	Best Actor	Kutob	Won	
PMPC Star Awards for Movies	1998	Best New Movie Actor of the Year	F.L.A.M.E.S.	Won	
PMPC Star Awards for Television	2004	Best Reality Competition Program Host	To The Max	Nominated	
PMPC Star Awards for Television	2013	Best Reality Competition Program Host	Karinderia Wars	Nominated	
PMPC Star Awards for Television	2013	Best Talent Search Program Host	Artista Academy	Nominated	
Young Critics Circle	2001	Best Performance by an Ensemble	Tanging Yaman	Won	
