= Justin Cuyugan =

Filipino actor

- Born: Justin Paulo Cuyugan; October 11, 1980 (age 45); San Fernando, Pampanga
- Occupations: Actor, director
- Years active: 1996–present
- Children: 3
- Mother: Mimi Mercado-Cuyugan

Justin Paulo Cuyugan (born October 11, 1980) is a Filipino character actor.

== Career ==
Cuyugan was one of the new talents launched by ABS-CBN's talent management arm Star Magic, then Star Circle, in 1999.

He was a character actor on the Kapamilya Network appearing as Emil Verdadero in Pusong Ligaw in 2017, and the demon Gaki in the fantasy series Bagani in 2018.

Cuyugan started his own construction business in the Philippines in 2022.

== Personal life ==
Cuyugan has three children from his first wife, who died of ovarian cancer in 2016.

He started dating ex-Pinoy Big Brother housemate in 2017, but the couple broke up in 2021. They met while filming FPJ's Ang Probinsyano on the Kapamilya Network.

In 2024, Anna Gonzales confirmed her three-year romantic relationship with Cuyugan.

== Filmography ==
=== Television ===
Year	Title	Role	Source
1998	Esperanza	Ferds	
2001–2002	Sa Dulo ng Walang Hanggan	Dondie Leviste	
2002–2003	Recuerdo de Amor	Samuel	
2005	Spirits	Balto	
2005	Etheria: Ang Ikalimang Kaharian ng Encantadia	Arkrey	
2006	Encantadia: Pag-ibig Hanggang Wakas	Arkrey	
2010	Rosalka	Johnny	
2010	Imortal	Alfredo Zaragoza	
2010	Precious Hearts Romances Presents: The Substitute Bride	Sam	
2011	Guns and Roses	King Santana	
2013	Bukas na Lang Kita Mamahalin	Armando Angeles	
2016	Magpahanggang Wakas	Dodong Natividad	
2016	FPJ's Ang Probinsyano	Apolinario "Apple" Mauricio	
2017	Pusong Ligaw	Emil Verdadero	
2018	Bagani	Gaki	
2018	Spirits Reawaken	Manuel Lacanilao	
2019	Ipaglaban Mo!	Miguel Aquino (Episode: "Kubli")	
2022	One Good Day	Roman Rodrigo	

=== Film ===
Year	Title	Role	Notes	Source
1999	GIMIK: The Reunion	Mark		
1999	Hey Babe!	Marlon		
2002	Kung Ikaw Ay Isang Panaginip	Wen		
2002	Forevermore	Francis		
2002	Jologs	Kundoktor		
2004	Volta	Percy Magtoto		
2016	The Unmarried Wife	Bobby		
