= Boots Plata =

Filipino film director (1943–2011)

- Born: Marcelino Victoriano; August 17, 1943; Quezon City, City of Greater Manila, Commonwealth of the Philippines
- Died: November 2, 2011 (aged 68); Taguig, Metro Manila, Philippines
- Resting place: The Heritage Park, Taguig
- Other names: Butse
- Occupations: movie director, actor and writer
- Years active: 1966-2003
- Spouse: Dolores Guevarra

Boots Plata (August 17, 1943 – November 2, 2011) was a Filipino movie director and writer.

== Early life and career ==
Born Marcelino Victoriano in Quezon City. Plata, who directed the 1999 blockbuster film Isusumbong Kita sa Tatay Ko... featuring Fernando Poe Jr. and Judy Ann Santos, had requested to be cremated. He had also asked for his ashes to be scattered in the Pasig River, according to long-time friend, showbiz columnist Ethel Ramos.

"Many are wondering why he chose the Pasig River; he must have had good memories of the place. Before he died, he also told his wife Dolor not to hold a wake for him. "What he wants is to hold a party," Ramos told The Philippine Daily Inquirer by phone.

Plata created over 10 films, mostly during the 1990s. His directorial debut was Pusakal (transl. Criminal), released in January 1984. He has also written two screenplays–Bakit 'Di Totohanin (2001) and Muling Ibalik ang Tamis ng Pag-ibig (1998). He was assistant director to Joey Gosiengfiao in the film Nympha (1980) and acting coach to the cast of Mano Po 2: My Home (2003).

== Personal life ==
He was married to talent manager Dolor Guevarra with whom he had two daughters, Jaypee and Anes Guevarra.

== Filmography ==
=== As director ===
| Year | Title | Note(s) | Ref(s). |
|---|---|---|---|
| 1984 | Pusakal | | |
| 1984 | Naked Island: Butil Ulan | | |
| 1984 | Take Home Girls | | |
| 1985 | Sex Object | | |
| 1989 | Killer vs. Ninja | | |
| 1992 | Si Lucio at si Miguel: Hihintayin Kayo sa Langit | | |
| 1992 | Buddy en Sol: Sine Ito! | | |
| 1992 | Unang Tibok ng Puso | | |
| 1996 | Sana Naman | | |
| 1996 | Kung Alam Mo Lang | | |
| 1996 | Nasaan Ka Nang Kailangan Kita? | | |
| 1997 | Wanted: Perfect Murder | | |
| 1997 | Kulayin Natin ang Bukas | | |
| 1998 | Muling Ibalik ang Tamis ng Pag-Ibig | | |
| 1999 | My Pledge of Love | | |
| 1999 | Honey, My Love, So Sweet | | |
| 1999 | Isusumbong Kita sa Tatay Ko... | | |
| 1999 | Weder-Weder Lang 'Yan | | |
| 2000 | Ayos Na ang Kasunod | | |
| 2001 | Bakit 'Di Totohanin | | |
| 2002 | Pakisabi Na Lang... Mahal Ko Siya | | |

=== As dubbing director ===
| Year | Title |
|---|---|
| 1987 | Rosa Mistica |
| 1988 | Kambal Tuko |
| 1988 | Super Inday and the Golden Bibe |
| 1988 | Me and Ninja Liit |
| 1989 | Magic to Love |
| 1989 | Long Ranger and Tonton: Shooting Stars of the West |
| 1989 | Impaktita |
| 1989 | Kung Maibabalik Ko Lang |

=== As dubbing supervisor ===
| Year | Title |
|---|---|
| 1988 | Petrang Kabayo at ang Pilyang Kuting |
| 1988 | Babaing Hampaslupa |

=== As assistant director ===
| Year | Title |
|---|---|
| 1977 | Tisoy! |
| 1978 | Mahal Mo, Mahal Ko |
| 1979 | Salawahan |
| 1979 | Diborsyada |
| 1979 | Bedspacers |
| 1980 | Nympha |

=== As associate director ===
| Year | Title |
|---|---|
| 1999 | Dito sa Puso Ko |

=== As an actor ===
| Year | Title |
|---|---|
| 1969 | Oh, Delilah! |
| 1971 | Make Laugh, Not War |
| 1971 | Luha sa Bawat Awit |
| 1988 | Ibulong Mo sa Diyos |

=== Writer ===
| Year | Title |
|---|---|
| 1971 | Alaala ng Pag-Ibig |
| 1998 | Muling Ibalik ang Tamis ng Pag-Ibig |
| 2001 | Bakit 'Di Totohanin |

=== As an acting coach ===
| Year | Title |
|---|---|
| 2003 | Mano 2: My Home |

=== As production manager ===
| Year | Title |
|---|---|
| 2002 | Mano Po |

=== As production designer ===
| Year | Title |
|---|---|
| 1977 | Hagkan Mo ang Dugo sa Kamay ni Venus |

== Health ==
Plata had his left leg amputated on December 16 last year as a complication to diabetes. An online report said a tumor was removed from one of Plata’s kidneys in 2007. However, biopsy conducted at the Capitol Medical Center said it was benign.

Cancer had already spread to his lungs and brain when it was diagnosed early this year, Ramos said. Plata refused to undergo chemotherapy two months ago, she added.

== Death ==
Plata succumbed to cancer at the St. Luke’s Medical Center in Quezon City. He was 68 and a diabetic who was diagnosed with lung cancer earlier in 2011.
