= Bachelor of Science in Hospitality & Catering Management =

The Bachelor of Science in Hospitality & Catering Management also known as BSc. HCM is a qualification in Hotel studies. This degree is also sometimes known as BHM (Bachelor of Hospitality Management) or (Bachelor of Hotel Management) and is a very popular Academic degree all over the world.

A combination of Hospitality, Tourism, Management, Arts, Science & Technology are studied in the BSc. HCM Degree. The qualification enhances the ability of the holder to gain jobs in the hospitality industry, of which hotels are an important part.

== Graduate degrees ==
Several large corporations involved with the hospitality industry, and management companies offer internship programs, management training programs, and direct placements into many operational, non-operational departments of hospitality and tourism sector for students studying or qualified in hospitality and tourism management.

== See also ==
- American Hotel & Lodging Educational Institute
- Confederation of Tourism and Hospitality
- Hospitality
- Hotel manager
- MICE
