= Hey Babe! (1999 film) =

1999 film directed by Joyce Bernal

- Official released poster
- Directed by: Joyce Bernal
- Screenplay by: Ricky Lee; Mel Mendoza-del Rosario
- Story by: Ricky Lee; Mel Mendoza-del Rosario; Dindo Perez
- Produced by: Malou N. Santos
- Starring: Jolina Magdangal; Marvin Agustin
- Cinematography: Charlie Peralta
- Edited by: Joyce Bernal; Marya Ignacio; Tara Illenberger
- Music by: Jessie Lasaten
- Production company: Star Cinema
- Distributed by: Star Cinema
- Release date: August 25, 1999
- Running time: 114 minutes
- Country: Philippines
- Language: Filipino

Hey Babe! is a 1999 Filipino romantic comedy film directed and co-edited by Joyce Bernal and written by Ricky Lee and Mel Mendoza-del Rosario from a story they co-developed with Dindo Perez. It stars Jolina Magdangal and Marvin Agustin in the lead roles, with the supporting cast include Gina Pareño, Alma Moreno, Dominic Ochoa, Roldan Aquino, and Nikki Valdez, and special participation of Joey Marquez.

Produced and distributed by Star Cinema, the film was theatrically released on August 25, 1999.

== Plot ==
Every Friday, Abigail religiously consults Madame Lola, a fortune teller. The old shrewd lady takes advantage of Abigail's extreme grip on superstition by giving her signs about the perfect man for her. Nelson also takes advantage of the situation and pays Madame Lola to give Abigail signs that would make her believe that he is the one for her. Eventually, through Nelson's perseverance and Madame Lola's bogus prediction, Abigail started to believe that Nelson is her Mr. Right. But there is no secret that remains uncovered. Abigail learns about Nelson's tricks; hence, her innocent love turns into a pure rage. It's now Nelson's turn to work things out and stop relying on his luck to the make-believe powers of cards and stars.

== Cast ==
- Jolina Magdangal as Abigail
- Marvin Agustin as Nelson
- Alma Moreno as Rose
- Gina Pareño as Madame Lola
- Nikki Valdez as Queenie
- Dominic Ochoa as Jim
- Joey Marquez as Felipe
- Koko Trinidad as Lolo
- Roldan Aquino as Jose
- J.R. Herrera as Noel
- Bearwin Meily as Noli
- Audrey Vizcarra as Marlella
- Mo Twister as Nito
- Monina Bagatsing as Ruby
- Justin Cuyugan as Marlon

== Soundtrack ==
Hey Babe! Original Motion Picture Soundtrack

Soundtrack album by Various artists
- Released: 1999
- Genres: Pop, ballad
- Label: Star Music
- Producers: Dennis R. Quila, Vehnee Saturno, Ben Escasa

Singles from Hey Babe! Original Motion Picture Soundtrack
- 1. "Oh Babe (ballad)" 2. "Chuva Choo Choo"

Hey Babe! is the soundtrack to the film and was released in 1999 by Star Music. It was awarded a gold record certification from the Philippine Association of the Record Industry.

=== Track listing ===
| No. | Title | Writer(s) | Producer | Length |
|---|---|---|---|---|
| 1. | "Oh Babe (ballad)" (Recorded by Jeremiah) | Renato Santos | Dennis R. Quila | 4:10 |
| 2. | "Baka Sakali" (Recorded by Jolina Magdangal and Marvin Agustin) | Vehnee Saturno | Vehnee Saturno | 4:14 |
| 3. | "I Love You Babe" (Recorded by Jeffrey Hidalgo, Richard Marten, and Bojo Molina) | Vehnee Saturno and Annabelle Regalado | Vehnee Saturno | 4:12 |
| 4. | "May Hinahanap Ang Puso" (Recorded by Jolina Magdangal) | Vehnee Saturno | Vehnee Saturno | 4:30 |
| 5. | "Chuva Choo Choo" (Recorded by Jolina Magdangal and Nikki Valdez) | Vehnee Saturno and Enrico Santos | Vehnee Saturno | 3:05 |
| 6. | "Hey Babe" (Recorded by Lito Camo) | Lito Camo | BMG Records Pilipinas | 4:18 |
| 7. | "Baile de Amor" ((instrumental)) | | Dennis R. Quila |
| 8. | "Open Sesame" (Recorded by Leila K) | Leila K | Beaver Music, Hong Kong |
| 9. | "Panaginip Lang Kaya" (Recorded by Tootsie Guevara) | Ben Escasa | Ben Escasa | 3:434 |
| 10. | "Oh Babe (dance)" (Recorded by Nikki Valdez, Carol Banawa, Kaye Abad, and Mo Twister) | Renato Santos | Dennis R. Quila |
| 11. | "Baka Sakali" (Recorded by Nikki Valdez and Richard Marten) | Vehnee Saturno | Vehnee Saturno |
| 12. | "Oh Babe (upbeat)" (Recorded by Jolina Magdangal) | Renato Santos | Dennis R. Quila |
| 13. | "Oh Babe Chuva Hey! (dance remix)" (Remix by Rico Blanco) |

=== Personnel ===
Adapted from the Hey Babe! Original Motion Picture Soundtrack liner notes.

- Dennis R. Quila – arranger (tracks 1, 4, 7, 10, 12)
- Tito Cayamanda – arranger (tracks 2, 3, 11)
- Arnold Buena – arranger (track 5)
- Marc Lopez – arranger (track 9)
- Noel Mendez – guitars (tracks 2, 3 4, 5, 11)
- Gerald Portacio – rap lyrics (track 10)
- Mo Twister – rap lyrics (track 10)
- Rico Blanco – remix (track 13)
