= Flames (Philippine TV series) =

Philippine television drama

- Title card from first to fourth week only
- Also known as: FLAMES f.l.a.m.e.s
- Genre: Comedy, drama, romance
- Starring: Various
- Opening theme: "Sweets for My Sweet" / various foreign and OPM songs
- Ending theme: "Flames" by Jeffrey Hidalgo / various foreign and OPM songs
- Country of origin: Philippines
- Original language: Tagalog

Production
- Running time: 30 minutes
- Production company: Star Creatives

Original release
- Network: ABS-CBN
- Release: November 11, 1996 – January 11, 2002

Related
- Gimik

Flames (stylized as FLAMES) is a youth-oriented Philippine television drama anthology show produced and broadcast by ABS-CBN. The series was broadcast from November 11, 1996, to January 11, 2002.

The series is currently streaming on Jeepney TV's YouTube channel.

== Film adaptation ==
FLAMES: The Movie
- Directed by: Jerry Lopez Sineneng; Khryss Adalia
- Written by: Shaira Mella Salvador; Mari Mariano
- Produced by: Charo Santos-Concio; Malou N. Santos
- Starring: Claudine Barretto; Rico Yan; Jolina Magdangal; Marvin Agustin; Bojo Molina
- Cinematography: Neil Daza; Mike Jacinto
- Edited by: Joyce Bernal
- Music by: Vehnee Saturno
- Production company: Star Cinema
- Distributed by: Star Cinema
- Release date: July 9, 1997
- Running time: 124 minutes
- Country: Philippines
- Language: Tagalog

Flames (or FLAMES: The Movie) is a 1997 Philippine film produced by Star Cinema. The movie was adapted from the afternoon drama series that ran from 1996 to 2002. The movie is separated into two episodes: Tameme, which stars Jolina Magdangal, Bojo Molina and Marvin Agustin and Pangako which stars Rico Yan and Claudine Barretto. The episodes were directed by Jerry Lopez Sineneng and Khryss Adalia respectively.

The film's theme song "Flames" was performed by Jeffrey Hidalgo. The Flames Original Motion Picture Soundtrack garnered gold album status.

=== Plot ===
==== Segment 1: "Tameme" ====
High school classmates Leslie (Jolina Magdangal), a wealthy girl, harbors a crush on the simple-living Butch (Marvin Agustin), who remains oblivious to her feelings, even as their classmate Rolly (Bojo Molina) also vies for Leslie's affection.

At Leslie's 18th birthday, Butch's jealousy flares upon seeing her dance with Rolly. Later, while traveling for theater play costumes, Leslie clarifies Rolly is just a friend, but they then get into an accident. Butch's apology call leads him to overhear Leslie's father's furious remarks against him, causing Butch to ignore Leslie, who in turn grows to resent him. Butch, believing himself unsuitable for Leslie and that Rolly is the right match distances himself.

During a dress rehearsal. Rolly's injury forces Butch to step in as Florante. Leslie, playing Laura backs out. The director demands they reconcile. After their performance, Butch confesses his love to Leslie, with Rolly in the audience seemingly happy for them.

==== Segment 2: "Pangako" ====
Karina Leviste (Claudine Barretto), once from a wealthy family, loses everything after her father's bone cancer diagnosis. Now living simply, she sacrifices her studies to support her mother, Doña Amparo (Boots Anson Roa), and siblings Emil (Marc Solis), Yvette (Paula Peralejo), and deaf-mute Sammy (Emman Abelada), by running a sari-sari store.

She grows close to Unilever sales agent Joel Bernabe (Rico Yan), but Doña Amparo disapproves, hoping Karina will marry someone of high social standing to restore their family's former status. After a family argument, a furious Doña Amparo confronts Karina about Joel. Karina lashes out, accusing her mother of treating her like a maid and being Irresponsible since her father's death, leading Karina to run away to Joel.

Joel, reassigned to Davao, urges Karina to choose him over her family. Torn, Karina is taken home by Joel, where she discovers Doña Amparo's depression over her absence. They reconcile. Later Karina learns her mother sold her wedding chinaware Doña Amparo reveals she still grieves her husband and sold the chinaware to fund Karina's approved college scholarship, thanking her for all her sacrifices. As Karina leaves for Manila, she and Joel share a heartfelt farewell, as he too departs for Davao.

=== Cast and Characters ===
==== Segment 1: "Tameme" ====
- Jolina Magdangal as Leslie Ledesma
- Marvin Agustin as Butch Morales
- Bojo Molina as Rolly
- Cheska Garcia as Dianne
- Kaye Abad as Jenny
- Jeffrey Hidalgo
- JR Herrera as Chito
- Marianne Dela Riva as Leslie's mother
- Toby Alejar as Leslie's father
- Daria Ramirez as Tita Elena
- Ray Ventura as Tito Rodel
- Lorena Garcia as Ada
- Mel Kimura

==== Segment 2: "Pangako" ====
- Claudine Barretto as Karina Leviste
- Rico Yan as Joel bernabe
- Boots Anson Roa as Doña Amaparo Leviste
- Marc Solis as Emil
- Paula Peralejo as Yvette
- Emman Abelada as Sammy
- Marita Zobel as Ms. Ronqullio
- Perla Bautista as Joel's mother
- Gerald Pizzaras as Andie
- Jan Marini Alano as Ada
- Richard Quan as Ada's husband

== See also ==
- List of programs broadcast by ABS-CBN
