= Ang Tanging Ina (film series) =

- Directed by: Wenn Deramas
- Written by: Wenn Deramas
- Produced by: Charo Santos-Concio; Malou Santos
- Starring: Ai-Ai delas Alas
- Cinematography: Sherman So
- Edited by: Vito Cajili; Marya Ignacio
- Music by: Jessie Lasaten
- Production companies: ABS-CBN Film Productions; APT Entertainment; OctoArts Films; M-Zet Productions (Enteng ng Ina Mo only)
- Distributed by: Star Cinema
- Release dates: May 28, 2003 (1); December 25, 2008 (2); December 25, 2010 (3)
- Country: Philippines
- Language: Filipino

Ang Tanging Ina (lit.: The Sole Mother/The Only Mother) is a Philippine comedy film series starring Ai Ai de las Alas in all title roles.

== Films ==
=== Ang Tanging Ina (2003) ===
With three dead husbands and twelve children to take care of, what is the modern day working mother supposed to do? Ina Montecillo (Ai-Ai delas Alas) is completely clueless on how to be an income provider and a homemaker at the same time given her dwindling finances of her household. As she desperately hides from her children her efforts to make all ends meet, her children grow resentful of her as she becomes a part of their own problems, but it seems that her best is never good enough. Funnily yet, Ina rallies her cause with all the courage she can muster- to be the best mother she knows how.

=== Ang Tanging Ina N'yong Lahat (2008) ===
The protagonist, Ina Montecillo (Ai-Ai delas Alas), represents the perfect Filipino mother. After more than 30 years of being a mother, she realizes she has not done anything for herself. The protagonist embarks on a journey of finding her self-worth, becoming the president of the Philippines in the process.

=== Ang Tanging Ina Mo (Last na 'To!) (2010) ===
Aside from Ai-Ai delas Alas, Eugene Domingo also returns in the last installment as Rowena. Majority of the characters reprise their roles in the film. Marvin Agustin, Kaye Abad, Nikki Valdez, Marc Acueza return in the last film after being absent in the previous sequel. Among the cast, Heart Evangelista is the only character to not appear in the final sequel due to reasons unknown. Also in this movie, appearances of Ina's husbands played by Tonton Gutierrez as Alfredo, Jestoni Alarcon as Kiko and Dennis Padilla as Eddie with the exception of Edu Manzano as Tony.

== Crossover ==
=== Enteng ng Ina Mo (2011) ===
Enteng Kabisote (Vic Sotto) wants to retire as the perennial hero of Engkantasya and have a normal life with his family without the magical elements. Ina Montecillo (Ai-Ai delas Alas) longs to have the right partner to be with her for the rest of her life.

One day, Enteng is placed under a powerful evil spell by Engkantasya's evil fairy Satana to fall in love with another woman. And when he meets Ina, he exerts all the effort Ina to fall for him. Ina, on the other hand, slowly opens her heart for this new opportunity of love.

Enteng then tries his best to be a father to Ina's children even if they are not fully supportive of him. But when their relationship gets serious, Ina discovers the truth – Enteng already has a family.

The movie is a crossover of the two film series, Ang Tanging Ina and Enteng Kabisote.

== Title and theme song ==
While the title literally means “sole mother”, it is also a minced version of the Tagalog profanity "putang iná" (literally, "whorish mother"), which is analogous to the English term "son of a bitch". It is also a play on the words "tangéng iná" (roughly “dummy mother”, from the Tagalog tangá “foolish”).

The first film’s theme song, meanwhile, heavily samples the 1995 Eurodance novelty hit La danse d'Hélène by the Italian group Real Joy.

== Characters ==
	Ang Tanging Ina (2003)	Ang Tanging Ina (TV Series)	Ang Tanging Ina N'yong Lahat (2008)	Ang Tanging Ina Mo: Last Na 'To! (2010)	Enteng ng Ina Mo (2011)
Ina Montecillo	Ai-ai delas Alas				
Rowena	Eugene Domingo				
Juan Montecillo	Marvin Agustin			Marvin Agustin	
Gertrudis "Tudis" Montecillo	Nikki Valdez			Nikki Valdez	
Dimitri "Tri" Montecillo	Carlo Aquino				
Portia "Por" Montecillo	Heart Evangelista				
Tirso "Pip" Montecillo	Alwyn Uytingco	Ketchup Eusebio	Alwyn Uytingco		
Sixto "Six" Montecillo	Marc Acueza			Marc Acueza	
Severina "Seven" Montecillo	Shaina Magdayao				
Catherine "Cate" Montecillo	Serena Dalrymple				
Samuel "Shammy" Montecillo	Jiro Manio				
Martin "Ten-Ten" Montecillo	Yuuki Kadooka				
Connie & Sweet Montecillo	Uncredited twins		Bianca & Janella Calma		
Antonio "Tony" A. Montemayor	Edu Manzano				
Alfredo B. Monteagudo	Tonton Gutierrez			Tonton Gutierrez	
Francisco "Kiko" C. Montecillo	Jestoni Alarcon			Jestoni Alarcon	
Eduardo "Eddie" D. Montenegro	Dennis Padilla			Dennis Padilla	
