= Chokoleit =

Filipino comedian and actor (1970–2019)

- Chokoleit in 2019
- Born: Jonathan Aguilar Garcia; June 25, 1972; Davao City, Davao, Philippines
- Died: March 9, 2019 (aged 46); Bangued, Abra, Philippines
- Resting place: Davao Memorial Park, Davao City, Philippines (cremated remains)
- Education: Ateneo de Davao University (BA)
- Occupations: Comedian; actor; television host
- Years active: 1990–2019
- Agent: Star Magic (2004–2019)

Jonathan Aguilar Garcia (Tagalog: [ˌd͡ʒoːnɐˈtan ʔɐɣɪˈlaɾ ɡɐɾˈsiːɐ]; June 25, 1972 – March 9, 2019), better known by his stage name Chokoleit (Tagalog: [ˌt͡ʃoːxoˈlɛɪ̯t]), was a Filipino comedian, actor, and TV host. He was best known for his role as Pearly Shell in the Philippine television series Marina. He is recognized as one of the pioneers of stand-up comedy in the Philippines.

== Early life and education ==
Chokoleit was born on June 25, 1972, in Davao City, Davao.

Chokoleit attended Ateneo de Davao University where he received his Bachelor of Arts in Mass Communication.

== Career ==
Chokoleit's showbiz career started in 1994 when he was discovered by movie director/talent manager Maryo J. de los Reyes. His contemporary was fellow stand-up comedian Gil "Ate Gay" Morales. Not soon after, he became a bit player in the GMA Network sitcom Haybol Rambol, sharing screen time with lead stars Dennis Padilla, Benjie Paras and Nida Blanca. He managed to stay with the sitcom until it was cancelled in 1995. He also became part of the talk show Brunch as comic relief to main hosts Bing Loyzaga and Michelle van Eimeren from 1998 to 1999 and started to appear in movies also as a bit player, while continuing his work as a stand-up comedian in The Library, Punchline and Laffline.

In 2004, Chokoleit bagged the role of Pearly Shell in the ABS-CBN fantaserye Marina after being recommended by director Wenn Deramas, who became instrumental to his career until the director's untimely death in 2016. From Marina, more TV shows and movies came for Chokoleit. His life story was essayed in the drama anthology Maalaala Mo Kaya and became a talent of the Kapamilya Network's "Star Magic".

== Death ==
Chokoleit died of a heart attack on the evening of March 9, 2019 at the age of 48, shortly after a performance at the Kawayan Festival in Bangued, Abra province. Before his death, he experienced difficulty breathing after his performance and was rushed to a local hospital. His remains were brought to Davao City for the funeral. He was cremated afterwards on March 17. His ashes were interred in Davao Memorial Park.

== Filmography ==
=== Film ===
Year	Title	Role	Notes	Source
1990	Kakampi Ko Ang Diyos			
1995	Rollerboys	Perla		
1997	Bawal sa Halik			
1999	Sa Paraiso ni Efren	Chokoleit		
2004	Volta	Denden		
2005	Bahay ni Lola 2	Glory		
2006	D' Lucky Ones	Bar host		
2006	Kapag Tumibok ang Puso: Not Once, But Twice			
2006	Metlogs (Metrosexual Adventures)			
2006	Zsazsa Zaturnnah Ze Moveeh	Didi		
2007	Pasukob	Inang		
2008	One Night Only	Edward		
2008	Ang Tanging Ina N'yong Lahat	Cabinet member		
2009	BFF: Best Friends Forever	Bona		
2009	OMG (Oh, My Girl!)	Toll Gay		
2010	Tarima	Gringo		
2012	Shake Rattle and Roll Fourteen: The Invasion	fat man/barber	Segment: "Unwanted"	
2013	Call Center Girl	Trainer		
2015	Etiquette for Mistresses	Bailey		
2016	Echorsis	The Devil Gay		
2018	Da One That Ghost Away	Chicken feet		
2018	Kusina Kings	Mr. Tsin Tsan Shih Tzu	Guest appearance	
2018	Sol Searching		Cameo	
2018	Fantastica	Princess Beauty	Final film appearance	

=== Television ===
Year	Title	Role	Notes	Source
2004	Marina	Pearly Shell		
2004	Maalaala Mo Kaya	Himself	Episode: "Comedy Bar"	
2005	Kampanerang Kuba	Otlum		
2006	Komiks	Dexter	Episode: "Paa ni Isabella"	
2006	Komiks	Tonette	Episode: "Inday sa Balitaw"	
2006	Komiks Presents: Da Adventures of Pedro Penduko	Bungisngis		
2007	Love Spell	Kitchi	Episode: "Click na Click"	
2008	Ligaw na Bulaklak	Aljon		
2008	Volta	Denden		
2010	Wansapanataym	Dexter	Episodes: "Inday Bote Part 1" & "Inday Bote Part 2"	
2010	Pilipinas Win na Win	Himself/co-host		
2010–11	Mara Clara	CG		
2012–13	Aryana	Dikya		
2013	Wansapanataym	Tinay	Episode: "Daddy, Daddy, Doggy!"	
2013	Juan dela Cruz	Lorelei Cortez		
2015	Wansapanataym	Gammy	Episode: "Selfie pa More, Sasha no More"	
2015	Ipaglaban Mo!	Minnie	Episode: "Ang Aking Pagkatao"	
2015	Mac and Chiz	Thief		
2016	FPJ's Ang Probinsyano	Jonel		
2018	Asintado	Gracia Nuevadez		
2018	Wansapanataym	Albularyo	Episode: "Switch Be With You"	
2018	It's Showtime	Chokoleit Gil	Miss Q & A: Fantastiktakan (last TV appearance before his death)	
