= Ang Tanging Pamilya (A Marry-Go-Round!) =

- Theatrical movie poster
- Directed by: Wenn V. Deramas
- Written by: Mae Chua; Anj Pessumal; Zig Marasigan; Kriz G. Gazmen; Juan Miguel Sevilla; Tats Quiblat
- Produced by: Tess V. Fuentes
- Starring: Ai-Ai delas Alas; Joseph Estrada; Toni Gonzaga; Sam Milby; Dionisia Pacquiao
- Cinematography: Elmer Despa
- Edited by: Marya Ignacio
- Music by: Jesse Lasaten
- Production company: Star Cinema
- Release date: November 11, 2009
- Running time: 100 minutes
- Country: Philippines
- Language: Filipino
- Box office: ₱79 million

Ang Tanging Pamilya (A Marry-Go-Round!) (lit. "The Only Family (A Marry-Go-Round!)") is a 2009 Philippine comedy film produced by Star Cinema, starring Ai-Ai delas Alas, and former Philippine president Joseph Estrada. It also features the popular loveteam of Sam Milby and Toni Gonzaga (their last film to feature themselves after You Are the One (2006), You Got Me! (2007) and My Big Love (2008) and Dionisia Pacquiao's first film portrayal. Before the set of the Ang Tanging Pamilya, director Wenn V. Deramas said that the film will be a Filipino version of the American film, Meet the Fockers, but with more funny moments inside it.

Contrary to public perception, the film is actually not a continuation of Ang Tanging Ina N'yong Lahat (2008). Rather, the film adds to Ai-Ai delas Alas's list of "Ina" films; hence her respectively being deemed as a "Tanging Ina."

The film's gross revenue was ₱79 million.

== Plot ==
The film begins with Sunshine Sicat on her way to her wedding, only to arrive too late as all the guests had gone home. On her second attempt, her groom, Dindo, helps a pregnant woman in distress, delaying the wedding. He apologizes to Sunshine, and they opt for a civil ceremony instead. The couple has five sons and a daughter named Charlie.

Charlie meets Prince on the road, but her Dindo disapproves of him as her boyfriend. In contrast, her mother, Sunshine, supports the idea of her daughter being with a worthy man. When Prince moves to the United States with his family, he and Charlie maintain a long-distance relationship online. Prince returns and proposes to Charlie. Initially, Dindo refuses to let his only daughter marry and continually meddles in their relationship. However, Prince persistently tries to impress Dindo, who eventually relents for his daughter's happiness.

Prince's parents arrive from Hawaii, and his mother, Marlene, clashes with Sunshine over the wedding preparations. On the wedding day, Dindo is dealing with a problem at his jeepney terminal when a pregnant woman appears again. By the time Dindo and Prince arrive, it was too late. This leads to a misunderstanding between Dindo and Sunshine, resulting in Prince and Charlie calling off their wedding.

Sunshine informs Charlie that Prince is leaving for the US again. They rush to follow him, and Prince proposes to Charlie once more, rekindling their love. On Charlie's wedding day, Dindo and Sunshine also have their long-awaited church wedding. The double wedding takes place, with Marlene catching both bouquets.

== Cast ==
- Ai-Ai delas Alas as Sunshine Aliayy-Sicat
- Joseph Estrada as Dindo Sicat
- Toni Gonzaga as Carlitoia "Charlie" Sicat
- Sam Milby as Prince Price
- Dionisia Pacquiao as Marlene Price
- Miguel Faustmann as Mr. Price, Marlene's husband
- Janus del Prado as Jestoni Sicat
- AJ Perez as Ernie Sicat
- Thou Reyes as Andrew E. Sicat
- Igiboy Flores as Aga Sicat
- Carl Camo as Vandolph Sicat
- Miguelito de Guzman as Buboy Sicat
- DJ Durano as Archie
- Candy Pangilinan as Ka-Away
- Empoy Marquez as Ka-Bado
- K Brosas as Deling
- Carla Humphries as Andi
- Tessie Moreno as Mrs. Aliayy, Sunshine's mother
- Lou Veloso as Mr. Aliayy, Sunshine's father
- Jinggoy Estrada as Young Dindo Sicat
- Izzy Canillo as Young Prince Price
- Brenna Peñaflor as Young Charlie Sicat

== SuperFerry 9 incident ==
On September 6, 2009, SuperFerry 9 capsized off the southwest coast of Zamboanga Peninsula with 971 people on board. Among the passengers were 29 crewmembers of Star Cinema. The employees shot some scenes in General Santos City for Ang Tanging Pamilya: A Marry Go Round. 1 crew member died in the accident. Estrada already appealed to the management of SuperFerry to help the victims. 11 of the Star Cinema crew members have been accounted for as of posting.

Alvin Despa, one of the passengers and an employee of Star Cinema, called DZMM and said many of the passengers were roused from their sleep after they felt the ship tilt. The crew on board the ship also included its art department staff. The crew brought with them equipment, vehicles and costumes which all ended up sinking with the ship. At 3 A.M., Tess Fuentes, operations director of Star Cinema, said she received a call saying that all passengers had already been given life jackets.

== See also ==
- Philippine films of the 2000s
