= Kriz Gazmen =

- Born: Kriz Anthony G. Gazmen; August 8, 1986 (age 40)
- Education: University of the Philippines Diliman
- Occupations: Businessman; film producer; screenwriter
- Years active: 2007–present
- Title: Head of Star Cinema; Business unit head of Black Sheep Productions

Kriz Anthony G. Gazmen (born August 8, 1986) is a Filipino businessman, screenwriter and film producer who is the current head of Star Cinema, the film division of ABS-CBN Corporation.

== Education ==
Gazmen graduated from the University of the Philippines Diliman with a Bachelor of Arts in Film and Audio-Visual Communication degree in 2007.

== Career ==
Gazmen was hired by Star Cinema in 2007 as a creative producer. By 2015, he was promoted to be a creative director for the studio. In producing films, Gazmen explained in an interview that the studio relies heavily on audience feedback, using focus group discussions to evaluate their films' performances. In 2018, Gazmen was assigned to be the business unit head of the newly-established Black Sheep Productions, which was created to produce films that are more appealing to a growing millennial market.

On May 1, 2022, Star Cinema managing director Olivia Lamasan stepped down from her position and appointed Gazmen as the new head of the film studio. The studio under Gazmen produced the romantic drama film Hello, Love, Again (2024), Star Cinema's first co-production with rival studio GMA Pictures, which became the first Filipino film to gross more than ₱1 billion at the box office.

== Filmography ==
Year	Title	Writer	Producer	Notes
2006	Co-ed Scandal	No	No	As actor only
2007	Maria Maria	Yes		Short film Also director
2008	My Big Love	No	Associate	
2008	When Love Begins	Story	Associate	Also creative assistant
2008	Ang Tanging Ina N'yong Lahat	Yes	Associate	
2009	T2	Addl. script	Associate	
2009	Ang Tanging Pamilya (A Marry-Go-Round!)	Yes	No	Also creative associate
2009	I Love You, Goodbye	Yes		
2010	Paano Na Kaya	Yes	No	Also creative associate
2010	Cinco	Addl. dialogue	No	Also creative associate
2010	I Do	Consultant	No	
2010	Ang Tanging Ina Mo: Last Na 'To!	No	No	As actor only
2011	Pak! Pak! My Dr. Kwak!	Consultant	No	
2011	Wedding Tayo, Wedding Hindi!	No	Creative	
2011	No Other Woman	Yes	Creative	
2012	One More Try	Yes	Creative	
2012	Sisterakas	Yes	Creative	
2013	Bromance: My Brother's Romance	Story	Creative	
2013	Call Center Girl	Yes	No	
2014	Starting Over Again	Consultant	No	
2014	Da Possessed	Addl. dialogue	No	Also script consultant
2014	My Illegal Wife	Story	Creative	
2014	She's Dating the Gangster	Consultant	No	
2014	The Trial	Yes	Creative	
2014	The Amazing Praybeyt Benjamin	Story	Creative	
2014	Feng Shui 2	No	Creative	
2015	Crazy Beautiful You	Consultant	No	
2015	The Breakup Playlist	Story	Creative	Also additional scenes and dialogue
2015	The Love Affair	Consultant	No	
2015	Ex with Benefits	Story	Creative	
2015	Etiquette for Mistresses	Yes	Creative	
2015	Everyday I Love You	Consultant	No	
2015	All You Need Is Pag-ibig	Story	Creative	
2016	Always Be My Maybe	Consultant	No	
2016	Just the 3 of Us	Consultant	No	
2016	How to Be Yours	No	Creative	
2016	Barcelona: A Love Untold	Consultant	No	
2016	Vince & Kath & James	No	Creative	
2017	Extra Service	No	Creative	
2017	My Ex and Whys	Consultant	No	
2017	Can't Help Falling in Love	Concept	No	Also script consultant
2017	Love You to the Stars and Back	No	Creative	
2017	Last Night	No	Creative	
2017	Gandarrapiddo! The Revenger Squad	Consultant	No	
2018	Sin Island	Story	Creative	
2018	Kasal	Story	Creative	
2018	I Love You, Hater	Story	No	Also script consultant
2018	Exes Baggage	Addl. dialogue	Creative	
2018	Ode to Nothing	No	Yes	
2018	To Love Some Buddy	No	Creative	
2018	Eerie	Consultant	No	
2019	Ani	No	Yes	
2019	Open	No	Yes	
2019	The Panti Sisters	No	Yes	
2019	Isa Pa with Feelings	No	Yes	
2019	You Have Arrived	No	Yes	
2019	Motel Acacia	No	Yes	
2020	Death of Nintendo	No	Yes	
2020	Fan Girl	No	Supervising	
2021	Love at First Stream	No	Yes	
2022	An Inconvenient Love	Consultant	Executive	
2022	Labyu with an Accent	Consultant	Executive	
2022	Partners in Crime	Consultant	Executive	
2023	Ang Mga Kaibigan ni Mama Susan	No	Yes	
2023	Third World Romance	No	Executive	
2023	A Very Good Girl	No	Executive	
2023	Rewind	Consultant	Executive	
2024	I Am Not Big Bird	No	Executive	
2024	Un/Happy for You	No	Executive	
2024	Hello, Love, Again	Consultant	Executive	
2024	And the Breadwinner Is...	No	Executive	
2025	Sosyal Climbers	Consultant	Executive	
2025	My Love Will Make You Disappear	No	Executive	
2025	Only We Know	No	Executive	
2025	Meet, Greet & Bye	No	Executive	
2025	Call Me Mother	No	Executive	
2025	Love You So Bad	No	Executive	
