= !Oka Tokat =

1997–2002 Philippine television drama series

- Title card
- Genre: Horror; Fantasy; Supernatural; Action; Comedy; Drama; Thriller; Adventure; Anthology
- Directed by: Don Cuaresma; Laurenti Dyogi; Michael de Mesa; Rez Cortez; Ricky Davao; Johnny Manahan; Jerry Lopez Sineneng; Wenn Deramas; Cathy Garcia-Molina; Richard Arellano
- Starring: Ricky Davao; Rica Peralejo; Diether Ocampo; Jericho Rosales; Angelika Dela Cruz; Paolo Contis; Agot Isidro; Joy Viado; Giselle Sanchez; Marc Solis; Lorena Garcia; Bojo Molina; Carmina Villarroel; Alessandra De Rossi; Jeffrey Quizon; Tin Arnaldo; Mel Martinez; Onemig Bondoc; Meryll Soriano; Nelson Evangelista; Alwyn Uytingco; Shaina Magdayao; Emman Abeleda; Joy Chiong; Jiro Manio
- Opening theme: "Okatokat" by Parokya ni Edgar (1997–2000) "Oka Tokat" by Freshmen (2001)
- Ending theme: "Would You Be Happier?" by The Corrs (One week before the reformat of the series in 2001)
- Country of origin: Philippines
- Original language: Filipino
- No. of episodes: 179

Production
- Running time: 30-40 minutes

Original release
- Network: ABS-CBN
- Release: June 24, 1997 – May 7, 2002

Related
- Oka2kat

!Oka Tokat is a Philippine television drama horror fantasy series broadcast by ABS-CBN. Directed by Don S. Cuaresma, Laurenti Dyogi, Michael de Mesa, Rez S. Cortez, Ricky A. Davao, Johnny Manahan, Jerry Lopez Sineneng, Wenn V. Deramas, Cathy Garcia-Molina and Richard I. Arellano, it stars Davao, Rica Peralejo, Diether Ocampo, Jericho Rosales, Angelika Dela Cruz, Paolo Contis, Agot Isidro, Joy Viado, Giselle Sanchez, Marc Solis, Lorena Garcia, Bojo Molina, Carmina Villarroel, Alessandra De Rossi, Jeffrey Quizon, Tin Arnaldo, Mel Martinez, Onemig Bondoc, Meryll Soriano, and Nelson Evangelista, Alwyn Uytingco, Shaina Magdayao, Emman Abeleda, Joy Chiong and Jiro Manio. It aired on the network's evening line up from June 24, 1997 to May 7, 2002, replacing Abangan ang Susunod Na Kabanata and was replaced by OK Fine, 'To ang Gusto Nyo!.

On December 4, 2001, !Oka Tokat was reformatted as a comedy horror adventure series.

Its title is the reverse spelling of the phrase "Takot ako!" (translates to "I'm scared!"); hence, the exclamation point at the beginning.

This series is currently available in Jeepney TV's YouTube Channel (until the last episode in 2001 only. The reformatted series is still not yet available)

== Plot ==
The show revolves around a media crew led by Rona del Fierro (played by Agot Isidro) who investigates paranormal cases with the help of del Fierro's premonitions. Most of the story arcs feature creatures in Filipino mythology, including the dwende (dwarf), tikbalang, diwata and the engkanto.

Sometime later in the reformat, it now revolves around a group of five children led by Rona's cousin Kyle (played by Emman Abeleda) who has inherited psychic powers from his mother. He is also joined by his new neighbors and friends including Twinkle (played by Shaina Magdayao), Bobong (played by Alwyn Uytingco), Britney (played by Joy Chiong) and Tofu (played by Jiro Manio).

== Cast and characters ==
=== Main cast ===
- Agot Isidro as Rona Catacutan del Fierro
- Ricky Davao† as Joaquin "Jack" Viloria
- Rica Peralejo as Richelou "Rikki" Montinola (1997–2000)
- Diether Ocampo as Benjamin "Benjie" Catacutan (1997–1999)
- Jericho Rosales as Jeremiah "Jeremy" Tobias (1997–2000)
- Angelika Dela Cruz as Tessa Sytangco (1997–1999)
- Paolo Contis as Niccollo "Nico" Tobias (1997–1999)
- Carmina Villarroel as Carmela de Dios (1999–2001)
- Bojo Molina as Yoyong Panaligan (1999–2001)
- Marc Solis as Marco Benitez (1997–2001; recurring in 1997–1998)
- Alessandra de Rossi as Teresa Gonzales (2000-2001)

=== Recurring cast ===
- Joy Viado† as Ligaya "Tita Gaying" Montinola (1997–2001)
- Giselle Sanchez as Magdalena "Dahlen" Karusealad (1997–2001)
- Lorena Garcia as Joy Montinola (1997–2001)

=== Extended cast ===
- G. Toengi as Melissa "Lizzie" Santiago
- Janette McBride as Andrea "Andie" Santiago
- Nelson Evangelista as Daniel De Dios (2000–2001)
- Zoren Legaspi as Brad Alcantara (2000)
- Tin Arnaldo as Abby (2001)
- Mel Martinez as Jigs (2001)
- Jeffrey Quizon as Lester (2000–2001)
- Onemig Bondoc as Monty del Rosario (2001)
- Meryll Soriano as Sofia Mendez (Cousin of Jigs; 2001)

=== Reformatted cast ===
- Emman Abeleda as Kyle
- Shaina Magdayao as Twinkle
- Alwyn Uytingco as Bobong
- Joy Chiong as Britney
- Jiro Manio as Tofu

=== Guest cast ===
- Marvin Agustin as Stephen
- Cherry Pie Picache as Michelle
- Glydel Mercado as Verna Vidal
- Sheila Marie Rodriguez
- Gandong Cervantes
- Wilson Go
- Jun Urbano
- Ching Arellano
- Lara Morena
- Dindi Gallardo
- Nanding Josef
- Perla Bautista
- Maricel Morales
- Noel Trinidad
- Joji Isla
- Luigi Alvarez
- Kaye Abad
- Michael Roy Journales
- Janus Del Prado
- Ronnie Quizon
- Joy Chiong
- Ate Gay
- Carol Banawa
- Flora Gasser
- Gary Lim
- Michael De Mesa
- Beth Tamayo
- Gina Pareño
- Assunta De Rossi
- Dimples Romana
- Baron Geisler
- Jestoni Alarcon as Ramon
- Emilio Garcia
- Richard Quan
- Sunshine Cruz
- Farrah Florer
- Ryan Eigenmann
- Adriana Agcaoili
- Janice De Belen
- Richard Arellano
- Nikki Valdez
- Daniel Fernando
- Susan Africa
- Raymond Bagatsing
- Chinggoy Alonzo
- Lailani Navarro
- Kristopher Peralta
- Boy 2 Quizon
- Jefferson Long
- Edward Dela Cruz
- Jomari Yllana
- Bong Regala
- Lui Villaruz
- John Lloyd Cruz
- Miguel Vera
- Connie Chua
- Eva Darren
- Doreen Bernal
- Rossana Jover
- Missy King
- Paula Peralejo
- Nonong De Andres
- Kuhol
- Steven Alonzo
- Jackie Castillejos
- Lucita Soriano
- Nante Montreal
- Andrea Del Rosario
- Gammy Viray
- Johnny Vicar
- Aurora Halili
- Nikka Ruiz
- Alicia Alonzo
- Cris Villanueva
- Roi Rodrigo
- Rita Avila
- Vivian Foz
- Dominic Ochoa
- Diana Enriquez
- Desiree Del Valle
- Marithez Samson
- Ronalisa Cheng
- Eugene Domingo
- Allan Palileo
- Spanky Manikan
- Alma Lerma
- Tess Dumpit
- Lora Luna
- Troy Martino
- Jodi Sta. Maria
- Kier Legaspi
- Georgia Ortega
- Melissa Mendez
- Mel Kimura
- Elpidio Fetalino
- Ronnie Lazaro
- Celia Rodriguez
- Maila Gumila
- Lovely Rivero
- Reuben Manahan
- Denise Joaquin
- Ramon Christopher
- Mia Gutierrez
- JR Herrera
- Donnie Fernandez
- Carlo Muñoz
- Guila Alvarez
- Rez Cortez
- Anna Marin
- Lester Llansang
- BJ De Jesus
- Sharmaine Suarez
- Glenda Garcia
- Maureen Mauricio
- Gabby Eigenmann
- Jeffrey Santos
- Mark Vernal
- Miguel Dela Rosa
- Sylvia Sanchez
- Raffy Bonanza
- Charlie Davao
- Ernie Zarate
- Rudy Meyer
- John Prats
- Camille Prats
- Stefano Mori
- Carlo Aquino
- Angelica Panganiban
- Kristine Hermosa
- Paolo Zobel
- Rita Magdalena
- Kathleen Hermosa
- Cris Daluz
- Carmi Martin
- Eric Quizon
- Jennifer Mendoza
- Niño Muhlach
- Gina Alajar
- Albert Martinez
- Rustom Padilla
- Chin Chin Gutierrez
- Jennifer Sevilla
- Evangeline Pascual
- Dennis Baltazar
- Yayo Aguila
- Jean Garcia
- Robert Arevalo
- Lara Fabregas
- Eula Valdez
- Niña De Sagun
- Brando Legaspi
- Charlon Davao
- Winnie Cordero
- Ray Ventura
- Renato del Prado
- Dante Rivero
- Joel Torre
- Pinky Amador
- Jao Mapa
- Tonton Gutierrez
- Vangie Labalan
- Patrick Garcia
- William Martinez
- Liza Ranillo
- Philip Lazaro
- Rommel Padilla
- Crispin Pineda
- Stella Ruiz
- Joe Gruta
- Tanya Garcia
- Boots Anson-Roa
- Jeffrey Hidalgo
- Symon Soler
- King Gutierrez
- Raquel Montesa
- Pocholo Montes
- Ricky Belmonte
- Hero Bautista
- Gladys Reyes
- Roi Vinzon
- Kevin Vernal
- Jean Saburit
- Bernard Palanca
- Vhong Navarro
- John Arcilla
- Ogie Diaz
- Pen Medina
- Caridad Sanchez
- Elizabeth Oropesa
- Tracy Vergel
- Mon Confiado
- Mark Gil
- Allan Paule as Eduardo
- Dick Israel
- Angel Aquino
- Suzette Ranillo
- Maria Isabel Lopez
- Manjo Del Mundo
- Mike Magat
- Odette Khan
- Archie Adamos
- Aya Medel
- Augusto Victa
- Lito Legaspi
- Ian Veneracion
- Dennis Roldan
- Katrina De Leon
- Corrine Mendez
- Kristine Bondoc
- Efren Reyes Jr.
- Kris Aquino
- Ricardo Cepeda
- Berting Labra
- Dindo Arroyo
- Luis Gonzales
- Romeo Rivera
- Tanya Gomez
- Ama Quiambao
- Lui Manansala
- Marita Zobel
- Mely Tagasa
- Malou De Guzman
- Arlene Tolibas
- Ces Quesada
- Christopher Roxas
- Sherilyn Reyes
- Chuck Perez
- Klaudia Koronel
- Bing Davao
- Vandolph
- Roy Alvarez
- Romnick Sarmienta
- Jaime Fabregas
- Bembol Roco
- Lito Pimentel
- Jaclyn Jose
- Gio Alvarez
- Ana Capri
- Via Veloso
- Lee Robin Salazar
- Chat Silayan
- Smokey Manaloto
- Jake Roxas
- Lloyd Samartino
- Amy Austria
- Julia Clarete
- Jay Manalo
- Tony Mabesa
- Eric Fructuoso
- Olive Isidro
- Cheska Garcia
- Spencer Reyes
- Miggy Tanchanco
- Gerard Fainsan
- Gerard Pizarras
- Princess Schuck
- Monina Bagatsing
- Victoria Haynes
- Tommy Abuel
- Juan Rodrigo
- Jackie Lou Blanco
- Rosemarie Gil
- Anton Bernardo
- Romy Sison
- Manilyn Reynes
- John Lapus
- Aljon Jimenez
- Cherie Gil
- Krista Ranillo
- Ian De Leon
- Mat Ranillo III
- Mymy Davao
- Pilar Pilapil
- Sharmaine Arnaiz
- Gino Paul Guzman
- Maritoni Fernandez
- Ramil Rodriguez
- Tirso Cruz III
- Gilleth Sandico
- Lilia Cuntapay
- Luz Fernandez
- Leandro Baldemor
- Rio Locsin
- Diego Salvador
- Toby Alejar
- Mailes Kanapi
- Marilyn Villamayor
- Ruel Vernal
- John Regala
- Beverly Salviejo
- Mylene Dizon
- Mandy Ochoa
- Anna Larrucea
- Bearwin Meily
- Tiya Pusit
- Ana Roces
- Irma Adlawan
- Patrick Dela Rosa
- Allen Dizon
- Yul Servo
- Robert Ortega
- Bobby Andrews
- Wowie De Guzman
- Timmy Cruz
- Tetchie Agbayani
- Rommel Montano as Satan
- Jess Lapid, Jr.
- Isko Moreno
- Louise delos Reyes
- Jenny Miller

== Sequel ==
In 2011, ABS-CBN announced that !Oka Tokat will have its sequel entitled "Oka2kat". It was supposed to be aired in March 2011 but it was delayed to February 4, 2012. The sequel did not focus on the previous characters but had the same genre.

== See also ==
- List of programs broadcast by ABS-CBN
- List of programs broadcast by Jeepney TV
