= Volta (TV series) =

Philippine television series

- Title card
- Genre: Comedy; Superhero; Sci-fi; Fantaserye
- Created by: ABS-CBN Studios
- Directed by: Wenn V. Deramas
- Starring: Ai-Ai delas Alas
- Country of origin: Philippines
- Original language: Filipino
- No. of episodes: 8

Production
- Executive producer: Mae N. Santos
- Production company: Star Creatives

Original release
- Network: ABS-CBN
- Release: January 26 – March 15, 2008

Related
- Volta

Volta is a Philippine television series on ABS-CBN, which was broadcast from January 26 to March 15, 2008. The series is a serialization of the 2004 film, Volta, produced by Star Cinema. It was a regional semi-finalist for the 2008 International Emmy Awards under the Comedy Program category.

This series was streaming on Jeepney TV YouTube Channel every 7:00 pm and was replaced by Princess Sarah.

== Synopsis ==
Volta, the Queen of Lightning kicks bad guys with her two children, 220 (Salty) and 110 (Pepper). Her husband, Mark, does not have superpowers and is unaware that his wife Perla is the superheroine Volta on whom he has a crush. The family live a complicated life of secrecy and double-secrecy as Volta tries to balance her life as a superheroine and a homemaker.

Aiding her in her complicated life are her best friends Din-Din and Nancy. Complications rise when a villainous "family" surfaces to darken Volta's days and move in on Perla's neighborhood as their next door neighbor. Will Volta ever win against her evil nemesis? Will her family find true happiness?

In the end, Volta sacrifices herself to the thunder elemental to save the world. However, before the last episode closes, a glimpse of her archenemy's hair is seen at a government cloning facility in Batangas.

== Cast and characters ==
- Ai-Ai delas Alas as Perla Magtoto/Volta
- Dino Imperial as Salty/220
- Mariel Pamintuan as Pepper/110
- Jayson Gainza as Mark
- Eugene Domingo as Nancy
- Chokoleit† as Din-Din
- Jackie Lou Blanco as Black Hola Hola
- Carlos Morales as Incredible Hunk
- DJ Durano as Anthony
- Jessy Mendiola as Chappy Girl
- Quintin Alianza as Ice Ice Baby
- Boy Abunda as Ama

== Production ==
The television series was adapted from the 2004 film of the same name, Volta after the movie is found to garner high ratings every time it is aired on television. Director Wenn Deramas credits Charo Santos for the idea of making the television series adaptation of the film.

Deramas said creation of the adaptation is advantageous while the film is still fresh on people’s minds saying they will see the changes in the life of the protagonist, Perla from being a maiden finding her one true love in the film to a housewife in the television series.

He insists that the series is different from the film and made some new elements to the television series. The series started with Perla, who has retired from her superheroine duties as Volta, with her husband Mark, whom she have two children, Salty and Pepper who would later be revealed to have inherited her superpowers.

Wenn introduced the Maskulado family, which serves as the antagonists of the series. The family are aliens who came from another planet who were exiled to Earth due to abusing their superpowers back at their homeworld. The director cited the Pixar animated film The Incredibles as inspiration for this decision, except stating that he made a family with superpowers as antagonists in contrast to the animated film which features a superhero family. Volta’s superhero costume was also altered to become more cosmopolitan and modern.

== Volta theme song ==
- Vincent de Jesus - original theme and musical score

== See also ==
- List of programs previously aired by ABS-CBN
- Volta
