= BFF: Best Friends Forever =

- Theatrical movie poster
- Directed by: Wenn V. Deramas
- Written by: Mel Mendoza del-Rosario
- Produced by: Charo Santos-Concio; Malou N. Santos
- Starring: Sharon Cuneta; Ai-Ai delas Alas; John Estrada
- Cinematography: Sherman Philip T. So
- Edited by: Marya Ignacio
- Music by: Jessie Lasaten
- Distributed by: Star Cinema
- Release date: May 13, 2009
- Running time: 101 minutes
- Country: Philippines
- Language: Filipino
- Box office: ₱102,500,000.00

BFF: Best Friends Forever is a 2009 Filipino comedy film released by Star Cinema. It stars Sharon Cuneta, Ai-Ai delas Alas and John Estrada. The film was released domestically on May 13, 2009.

== Plot ==
Honey, a housewife, suspects her husband Tim of being unfaithful. To improve her appearance, she joins a gym and meets Frances, who has a boyfriend named TJ—Tim's alter ego. Tim, while with Frances, discovers she is pregnant with his baby. He cries, but Frances mistakes his tears for joy.

Honey and Frances are having a good time at a restaurant when Frances passes out and her phone rings. Honey answers the call, and Tim, thinking he is speaking to Frances, confesses he is married with three children. Enraged, Honey plots revenge on Frances and tries to keep Tim away from her. Eventually, they discover Tim is to blame for the situation. Honey and Frances reconcile and become best friends again. Honey forgives Tim, who is elated but then tragically gets hit by a car and dies. Frances and Honey continue their close friendship.

== Cast ==
- Sharon Cuneta as Honey
- Ai-Ai delas Alas as Frances
- John Estrada as Tim/TJ
- Empress Schuck as Nina
- Miles Ocampo as Katkat
- AJ Perez as Miguel
- Enchong Dee as Paco
- DJ Durano as Eric
- Gina Pareño as Lola
- Chokoleit as Bona
- Joy Viado as Daisy
- Nash Aguas as Paupau
- Kiray Celis, Helga Krapf and Krista Valle as Mean Girls
- Carl Camo as Junjun
- Carlos Morales as Chito
- Dang Cruz as Edna
- Gabby Concepcion as the new guy prospect (uncredited)

== Reception ==
=== Box office ===
The film was a box office success. The film grossed P43.6 million on its opening weekend. The film had grossed P102.5 million on its entire theatrical run.
