= Ang Tanging Ina =

2003 film by Wenn V. Deramas

- DVD cover
- Directed by: Wenn V. Deramas
- Screenplay by: Mel Mendoza del Rosario; Keiko Aquino; Additional screenplay: Artemio C. Abad Jr.
- Story by: Mel Mendoza del Rosario; Story idea: F.M.G.; Concept: Raymond Diamzon
- Produced by: Elma S. Medua
- Starring: Ai-Ai delas Alas; Marvin Agustin; Nikki Valdez; Carlo Aquino; Heart Evangelista; Alwyn Uytingco; Marc Acueza; Shaina Magdayao; Serena Dalrymple; Jiro Manio; Yuki Kadooka; Eugene Domingo
- Cinematography: Sherman So
- Edited by: Vito Cajili
- Music by: Jessie Lasaten
- Production company: Star Cinema
- Distributed by: Star Cinema
- Release date: May 28, 2003
- Running time: 104 minutes
- Country: Philippines
- Language: Filipino
- Box office: ₱178.82 million

Ang Tanging Ina (roughly "The One and Only Mother") is a 2003 Filipino comedy film directed by Wenn V. Deramas and starring Ai-Ai delas Alas and Eugene Domingo. The film tells the story of a thrice-widowed mother of twelve children and the trials they go through as a family. Produced by Star Cinema, the film was theatrically released on May 28, 2003.

It broke the record for the highest grossing Filipino film of all time, surpassing Anak; it was later surpassed by Sukob in 2006. The film's success spawned a television series of the same name, as well as three sequels: Ang Tanging Ina N'yong Lahat, Ang Tanging Ina Mo: Last Na 'To!, and Enteng ng Ina Mo.

== Plot ==
Ina has four children from each of her three husbands who all die under comedic circumstances. Tony, a wealthy gambler, dies after falling from a stool while watching a spider derby; Alfredo, a medical doctor, dies while evacuating from a movie theater; Kiko, a driver, is electrocuted to death on their wedding day which they had saved up for. Afterwards, Ina decides not to remarry. She later sells her second husband's bus company for a meager sum, causing her to worry about supporting her growing children. Her eldest, Juan, begins to seek employment after caring for the household while Ina searches for work. Tudis, the second child, struggles to keep a job as she pursues an art career; the fourth child, Por, anticipates a lavish debut party beyond what Ina could actually afford.

After working odd jobs, Ina finds steady income working as a drag performer at a nightclub, allowing her to care for the family in the daytime. However, her new job also becomes a source of embarrassment for her children. Tri, the third child, is especially affected as he distances himself from his studies after his girlfriend’s parents prevent them from dating because of Ina’s lowbrow profession. Meanwhile, Pip, the fifth child, is a closeted homosexual with a crush on one of the school athletes; Seven, the seventh child, struggles to write an essay about mothers for a contest. Six, the sixth child, invites Ina to a prayer retreat with him but Cate, the eighth child, tricks her into attending the venue dressed as a witch, humiliating Six and frightening his schoolmates. Amidst the turmoil, Ina finds comfort in her lifelong friend Rowena.

Juan now works at an amusement park where he reunites with his old girlfriend Jenny. They eventually discuss marriage until Juan brings Shammy, the ninth child, to the hospital. Shammy had been bullied in school due to being uncircumcised, pressuring him to have a cheap circumcision that results in an infection. Ina soon arrives at the hospital with help from a taxi driver named Eddie. The two grow close while monitoring Shammy’s recovery. One day, Ten-Ten, the tenth child, suddenly goes missing. Ina and Seven find him at a church while praying, and later discover that he is deaf. After bringing Ten-Ten home, Ina confronts her children about their true financial situation which has led her to work multiple jobs. Everyone is moved except Juan who elopes with Jenny.

To preserve her children’s dignity, Ina resigns from her job at the club. On the bus ride home, she catches a suicide bomber and alerts the other passengers to evacuate. Ina escapes the bus herself shortly before the bomb detonates, killing the bomber and leaving her with minor injuries. The children rush to the hospital where they tearfully reconcile with their mother. At Por’s smaller debut party, Juan and Jenny choose not to marry yet, Tri reunites with his girlfriend, Pip comes out to Ina, and Seven wins her essay contest. Eddie joins the party but is launched into the air by a firecracker in his pocket. Ina narrates that he survived and later married her but the accident left him unable to have children. During the credits, the family learn sign language together to communicate with Ten-Ten.

== Cast ==
=== The Montecillo Family ===
- Ai-Ai delas Alas as Ina Montecillo, the matriarch of the Montecillo family who works several jobs to support her twelve children whom she gives nicknames based on their numerical order by birth.
- Marvin Agustin as Juan Montecillo, the eldest child who is hardworking but also rather loose-lipped.
- Nikki Valdez as Gertrudis "Tudis" Montecillo, the second child who has an aspiring career as a painter but struggles to remain employed as a result.
- Carlo Aquino as Dimitri "Tri" Montecillo, the third child who is a highly intelligent college student.
- Heart Evangelista as Portia "Por" Montecillo, the fourth child who has a sassy attitude and hopes for the "perfect debut" throughout the film.
- Alwyn Uytingco as Peter Ivan Potenciano "Pip" Montecillo, the fifth child who is secretly gay and hides his identity from the rest of his family
- Marc Acueza as Sixto "Six" Montecillo, the sixth child who is also intelligent and still grappling with the loss of his father.
- Shaina Magdayao as Severina "Seven" Montecillo, the seventh child who shows considerable talent as a writer in her class, earning her a nomination into a school essay contest.
- Serena Dalrymple as Catherine "Cate" Montecillo, the eighth child who is tomboyish and rather troublesome.
- Jiro Manio as Samuel "Shammy" Montecillo, the ninth child (his nickname comes from siyam, the Tagalog word for nine) who is bullied in school due to being uncircumcised as his mother repeatedly forgets to appoint his surgery or misses it.
- Yuuki Kadooka as Martin "Ten-Ten" Montecillo, the tenth child who is notably quiet throughout the film due to his deafness.

Additionally, two uncredited babies portray Connie and Sweet, Ina's infant twin daughters and the youngest Montecillo children.

- Dennis Padilla as Eduardo "Eddie" D. Montenegro, a taxi driver who regularly brings Ina home from work, helps watch over her son at the hospital, and becomes her fourth husband at the end of the film.
- Edu Manzano as Antonio "Tony" A. Montemayor, Ina's first husband, a wealthy man with a gambling addiction that eventually leads to his death. He is the father of Juan, Tudis, Tri and Por.
- Tonton Gutierrez as Alfredo B. Monteagudo, Ina's second husband, a medical doctor who also inherits a bus company from his parents before giving it to Ina for her to manage. He is the father of Pip, Six, Seven and Cate.
- Jestoni Alarcon as Francisco "Kiko" C. Montecillo, Ina's third husband, a professional driver who briefly manages Ina's bus company before returning it to her due to his poor leadership. He is the father of Shammy, Ten-Ten, Connie and Sweet.

=== Other characters ===
- Eugene Domingo as Rowena, Ina's best friend who is fiercely loyal and supportive of her endeavors.
- Kaye Abad as Jenny, Juan's college girlfriend who later becomes his co-worker.
- Angelica Panganiban as Gretchen, Tri's college girlfriend.
- John Prats as Jeffrey, Por's high school crush who agrees to escort Por at her debut and becomes her boyfriend shortly afterwards.
- Pinky Amador and Mandy Ochoa as Gretchen's parents.
- Andoy Ranay as Bruno, a former technician at Ina's bus company who later invites Ina to work at his nightclub.
- Connie Chua as Ina's mother who runs a traveling circus and uses her own daughter for stunts.
- Kris Aquino a host from Game KNB? in TV Footage which Tri watches at Gretchen's home.

== Release ==
Ang Tanging Ina was released on May 28, 2003.

On June 3, 2003, 500 moviegoers watching the film in one of the theaters at SM City Manila panicked and rushed outside the cinema when a scene that features a bus explosion coincided with the loud drilling of construction workers a floor below, causing audiences to assume that a bomb exploded in the building.

== Sequel ==
In 2008, the Star Cinema brought the second installment of Ang Tanging Ina film series which still starred Ai-Ai de las Alas, Eugene Domingo, and several others. The film revolves around Ina (Ai-Ai de las Alas) who lately became the President of the Philippines and overturns the Philippines by ruling it into a whole new dimension of enjoyment which eventually causes her many serious problems about the country and with her family as well.

== Television series spin-off ==
Ang Tanging Ina
- Title card
- Genre: Comedy, Drama
- Created by: ABS-CBN
- Based on: Ang Tanging Ina (film)
- Written by: Keiko Aquino; Joel Mercado; Chris Violago
- Directed by: Wenn V. Deramas; Joyce E. Bernal
- Starring: Ai-Ai delas Alas; Marvin Agustin; Carlo Aquino; Eugene Domingo; John Estrada; Roderick Paulate; Tuesday Vargas
- Theme music composer: Jonathan Tiongco
- Opening theme: "Ang Tanging Ina" by Ai Ai Delas Alas
- Ending theme: "Ang Tanging Ina" by Ai Ai Delas Alas
- Country of origin: Philippines
- Original language: Filipino
- No. of episodes: 74

Production
- Executive producer: Nini Matilac
- Producer: Cynthia D. Jordan
- Editors: Roy Francia; Aries Pascual; Jake Maderazo
- Running time: 29-50 minutes
- Production company: Star Creatives

Original release
- Network: ABS-CBN
- Release: August 17, 2003 – January 30, 2005

After the original film's phenomenal success, a TV sitcom was produced on ABS-CBN. It aired from August 17, 2003, to January 30, 2005, replacing Home Along Da Riles and was replaced by Goin' Bulilit. All of the actors who portrayed members of Ina's family return with the exception of Alwyn Uytingco who was replaced by Ketchup Eusebio.

The series is currently available on Jeepney TV's YouTube channel (Episode 45 is the only episode not available).

=== Synopsis ===
The television sitcom continues the story of the Montecillo family following the events of the 2003 film. The series opens with the planned wedding of Ina Montecillo and Eddie, which is unexpectedly disrupted by the arrival of Goliath, who claims to be Ina's long-lost brother. Goliath comes from Zambales accompanied by members of their tribe and reveals details about Ina's past, including the circumstances surrounding her abandonment by their biological mother at a traveling fair (perya).

Initially distrustful of Goliath and rejecting his claims, Ina's suspicions begin to fade after a serious accident occurs on her wedding day, when she is struck by a fire truck. Goliath assists the family during the crisis and donates blood to save Ina's life, ultimately convincing her of his sincerity. Despite the disruption, Ina and Eddie proceed with their wedding, which takes place inside the hospital room where Ina is recovering.

Following the wedding, Ina becomes increasingly fearful of what she believes to be a curse—that every man she marries is destined to die. Concerned for Eddie's safety, she makes the difficult decision to distance herself from him, sending him to work overseas in Saudi Arabia in an attempt to protect him.

The series then focuses on Ina's life as she continues to raise her twelve children on her own, dealing with everyday family problems, financial struggles, neighborhood conflicts, and humorous misadventures.

=== Cast ===
- Ai-Ai delas Alas as Ina Montecillo: Ina is the matriarch of the Montecillo family and the mother of twelve children: Juan, Tudis, Tri, Por, Pip, Six, Seven, Cate, Shammy, Ten-ten, Connie, and Sweet. She is known for her fierce devotion to her children and her willingness to take on any job to support them. Throughout the series, Ina works in various occupations while dealing with personal loss, including the death of her husband, Eddie. Despite numerous hardships and a supposed curse affecting her marriages, Ina remains resilient and continues to hold her family together.
- Marvin Agustin as Juan Montecillo: Juan is Ina's eldest child and one of the primary providers for the family. Responsible and hardworking, he often acts as a second parent to his younger siblings. Juan saves money from his work in preparation for his planned marriage to his girlfriend, Jenny, while continuing to support his mother and siblings. Years later, prior to the events of the 2008 film sequel, Juan and Jenny migrated to New Zealand for a new life.
- Nikki Valdez as Getrudis "Tudis" Montecillo: Tudis is Ina's second child and a college graduate. Practical and dependable, she works to help sustain the family financially. Tudis frequently assists Ina in managing household responsibilities and acts as a voice of reason among her siblings. Years later, prior to the events of the 2008 film sequel, she migrated to Canada where she met the man of her life.
- Carlo Aquino as Dimitri "Tri" Montecillo: Tri is the third child of Ina and a bright college student. Intelligent and ambitious, he balances his academic responsibilities with his romantic relationship with his wealthy girlfriend, Gretchen.
- Heart Evangelista as Portia "Por" Montecillo: The fourth child of Ina. She is known for her sassy personality and strong interest in fashion and femininity. Years later, prior to the events of the 2008 film sequel, Por migrated to India as a missionary.
- Ketchup Eusebio as Peter Ivan Potenciano "Pip" Montecillo: Pip is Ina's fifth child and is openly homosexual. After winning the Super Flying Gay beauty contest, he decided to undergo plastic surgery, which initially shocks the family. Prior to the events of the 2008 film sequel, Pip reverses the surgery, returning to his original appearance.
  - Alwyn Uytingco as Peter Ivan Potenciano "Pip" Montecillo (Guest appearance)
- Marc Acueza as Sixto "Six" Montecillo: Six is the sixth child of Ina and is academically gifted. He excels in declamations and public speaking, often representing his school in competitions. Years later, prior to the events of the 2008 film sequel, he migrated to London to work there as a nurse.
- Shaina Magdayao as Severina "Seven" Montecillo: Seven is Ina's seventh child and one of the most responsible members of the family. Intelligent and mature for her age, she is often entrusted with caring for her younger siblings, particularly the twins Connie and Sweet, while Ina and the older children are away.
- Serena Dalrymple as Catherine "Cate" Montecillo: Cate is the eighth child of Ina and has a tomboyish personality. She is rebellious and frequently skips school, often clashing with Ina over discipline and responsibility.
- Jiro Manio as Samuel "Shammy" Montecillo: Shammy is Ina's ninth child and is mischievous by nature. Known for his playful and troublesome behavior, he often causes chaos within the household but remains deeply loved by his family.
- Yuuki Kadooka as Martin "Ten-ten" Montecillo: Ten-ten is Ina's tenth child and is deaf-mute. He communicates using sign language, which the family learns in order to better connect with him.
- Eugene Domingo as Rowena: She is Ina's best friend who now owns a meat stall at the Commonwealth Market and provides emotional and practical support to Ina during difficult times. Rowena is fiercely loyal and often involves herself in the Montecillo family's problems.
- Dennis Padilla as Eduardo "Eddie" Montenegro: Eddie is Ina's husband, whom she marries despite her fear of a curse affecting her marriages. To protect him, Ina sends Eddie to work in Saudi Arabia, separating them for a period of time. After returning home, he dies in a stove explosion, leaving Ina widowed once again. His funeral was later reshown and retconned in the 2008 sequel film.
- Roderick Paulate as Goliath: Ina's long-lost brother from Zambales who appears during the pilot episode of the series. Initially rejected by Ina, he eventually gains her trust by proving his sincerity and helping the family during a crisis. His arrival reveals long-hidden details about Ina's past.
- Tuesday Vargas as Kring-Kring: Rowena's assistant at the market who eventually befriends the Montecillo family.
- John Estrada as Geronimo "Gerome" Madlang-tuta: Gerome is a lifeguard whom Ina and her family met during a vacation at a resort. Arrogant, narcissistic, and womanizing, he is later revealed to be a cousin of Rowena. Following Eddie's death, Gerome becomes romantically involved with Ina, and the two plan to marry in the series’ penultimate episode. However, it is eventually revealed that Gerome has been using Ina and is truly in love with his childhood friend, Jane, leading to the end of his relationship with Ina.
- Archie Alemania as Richard: Gerome's close friend and accomplice, sharing his playboy tendencies.
- Maricel Soriano as Jane: She is Gerome's flirtatious childhood friend and his love-interest. Although initially absent from his relationship with Ina, she is later revealed to be the woman Gerome genuinely loves, ultimately leading to his decision to leave Ina and abandon their planned marriage.
- Angelica Panganiban as Gretchen: Tri's wealthy girlfriend.
- Elizabeth Ramsey as Elizabeth: She is Ina's biological mother, who is revealed to have accidentally abandoned Ina at a perya during her childhood, after which Ina was adopted by another woman. After discovering her husband Elvis cheated to her, Elizabeth attempted to place a curse on him in a moment of distress, but it was unintentionally inflicted on Ina instead. Elizabeth later dies.
- Freddie Webb as Elvis: He is Ina's long lost biological father and Elizabeth's former husband. He left Elizabeth for another woman, abandoning both Ina and Goliath. His actions triggered the events that led to the curse affecting Ina's marriages. Ina and Goliath later found Elvis, who is revealed to be living happily with his new wife.
- Edu Manzano as Alexander: He is a man who closely resembles Ina's deceased first husband, Tony. During Eddie's absence while working in Saudi Arabia, Ina briefly develops feelings for Alexander as she longs for companionship. The relationship ends when Ina realizes that pursuing Alexander is not right, as she remains married and loyal to Eddie.
- Dolphy as Kevin Kósme: He is a crossover character from the sitcom, Home Along Da Airport. He encounters the Montecillo family in one episode while delivering meat orders from Aling Azon to Rowena. During Ina's absence, Kevin displays a fatherly presence toward the Montecillo children, temporarily filling a parental role.

== See also ==
- Ang Tanging Ina (film series)
- Ang Tanging Ina N'yong Lahat
- Ang Tanging Ina Mo: Last Na 'To!
- Enteng ng Ina Mo
- List of programs broadcast by ABS-CBN
