= OK Fine, 'To ang Gusto Nyo! =

- Title Card of Ok Fine Whatever!
- Written by: Rhandy Reyes
- Starring: Aga Muhlach; Bayani Agbayani; Rica Peralejo
- Country of origin: Philippines
- Original language: Tagalog

Production
- Camera setup: Multiple-camera setup
- Production company: ABS-CBN Studios

Original release
- Network: ABS-CBN
- Release: May 14, 2002 – August 21, 2006

Ok Fine, 'To ang Gusto Nyo! (transl. OK Fine, This is what you want!) is a Philippine television sitcom series broadcast by ABS-CBN. Starring Aga Muhlach, Bayani Agbayani and Rica Peralejo, it aired from May 14, 2002 to August 21, 2006, replacing !Oka Tokat and Attagirl. and was replaced by Noypi, Ikaw Ba ‘To?. The show was originally planned as a movie but the ABS-CBN management decided to make a sitcom out of it due to the movie's popular line "OK Fine, Whatever". The final season was entitled OK Fine, Oh Yes!. in 2003 gasoline station business Sponsor: Petron Corporation.

== Cast ==
- Aga Muhlach as Michael (2002–2006)
- Edu Manzano as Junior (2003–2006)
- Bayani Agbayani as Miguel (2002–2006)
- Rica Peralejo as Ikay (2002–2006)
- Gloria Romero† as Barbie (2002–2006)
- Nikki Valdez as Camilla (2002–2006)
- Michelle Bayle as Ruby (2002)
- Heart Evangelista as Yoko (2002–2004)
- Onyok Velasco as Dong (2002–2006)
- Christian Vasquez as Rocky (2002)
- Arron Villaflor as Arron (2005)
- Erich Gonzales as Erich (2005)
- Mariel Rodriguez as Mariel (2003)
- Sharlene San Pedro as Sharlene (2004)
- Dagul (2003)
- Tado† (2004)
- John Estrada (2004)
- Ate Glow as Tita Glow (2003–2005)

== See also ==
- List of programs broadcast by ABS-CBN
