= Ai-Ai delas Alas =

Filipina actress and comedian (born 1964)

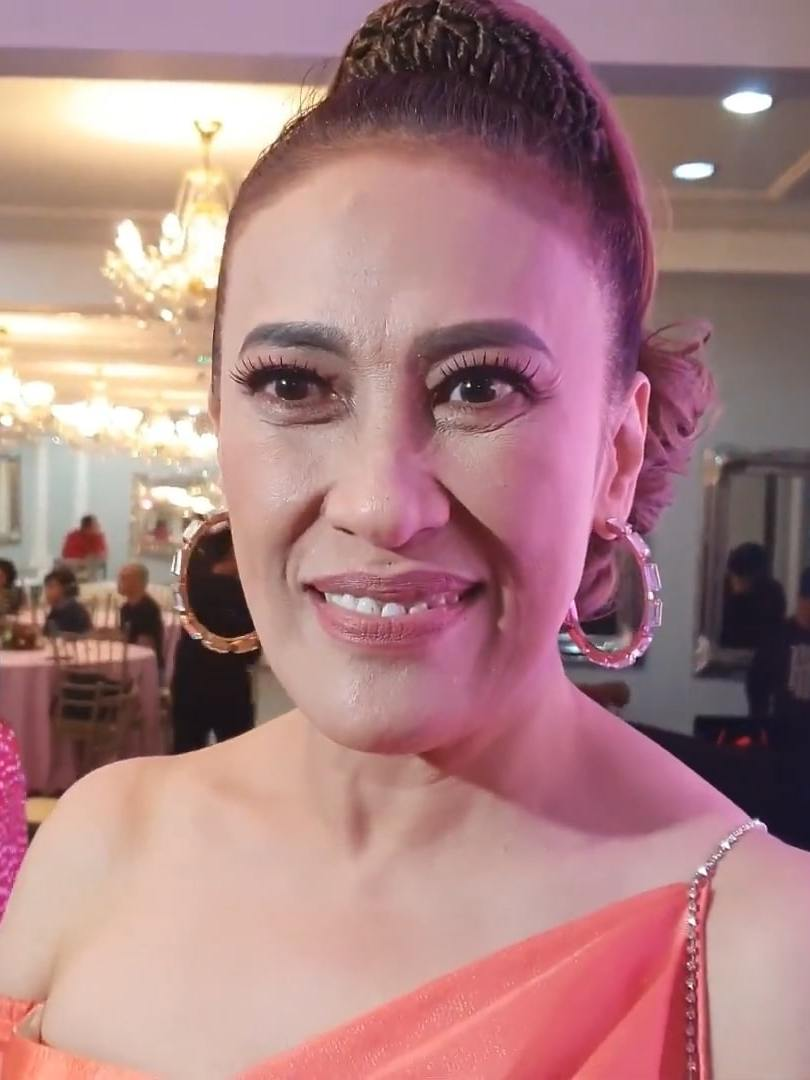
- Delas Alas in 2020
- Born: Martina Eileen Hernandez delas Alas; November 11, 1964 (age 61); San Luis, Batangas, Philippines
- Education: Far Eastern University
- Occupations: Actress; singer; comedian; television personality
- Years active: 1985–present
- Agents: GMA Network (1991–2000; 2015–present); ABC/TV5 (1998–2004, 2016–2022; 2025–present); ABS-CBN (2000–2015; 2023–present); Sparkle (2020–present); Viva Artists Agency (2025–present)
- Spouses: Miguel Vera (m. 1989; ann. 1996) Jed Salang (m. 2013; div. 2013) Gerald Sibayan (m. 2017; div. 2026)
- Children: 3
- Relatives: Ogie Alcasid (cousin)
- Musical career
- Genres: EDM; dance
- Labels: Ivory Music and Video; Star Music (2004–2014; 2025–present); GMA Music (2017–2025)

Martina Eileen "Ai-Ai" Hernandez delas Alas (born November 11, 1964) is a Filipino actress and comedian. Referred to as the "Queen of Comedy" for her comedic talent, she is best known for her role as Ina Montecillo in the film series Ang Tanging Ina. Her accolades include two Star Awards for Movies, a FAMAS Award, a Metro Manila Film Festival Award, an ASEAN International Film Festival and Awards, and a Cinemalaya Independent Film Festival, including nominations for three Gawad Urian and three Luna Awards. Her films have collectively earned ₱2.41 billion, making her the highest grossing Filipino comedy actress of all time.

== Early and personal life ==
Martina Eileen Hernandez Delas Alas is the daughter of Rosendo delas Alas (1920–2008) and Gregoria delas Alas née Hernández (died December 30, 2013) from Brgy. Taliba, San Luis, Batangas, and was later adopted by her aunt along with her brother Allen Tabada, Justa delas Alas. She earned a mass communication degree from Far Eastern University in 1985.

She was married to actor Miguel Vera, with whom she had two children; she also has a son from a previous relationship with Hernan Jeng Jeng Viola, a guitarist. Before acting, she worked as a sales assistant in a department store, and also performed as a stand-up comic in comedy bars around Metro Manila. On April 3, 2013, she married Jed Salang who was 20 years her junior. The marriage ended after a month, with delas Alas confirming their separation on May 19, 2013. Delas Alas confirmed through Instagram her engagement to Gerald Sibayan in April 2017; the two married in November 2017 at Christ the King Parish Church in Quezon City. In November 2024, the couple officially confirmed their separation.

She is also cousins with Ogie Alcasid.

== Career ==
=== First career on GMA Network and moved to ABS-CBN (1991-2014) ===
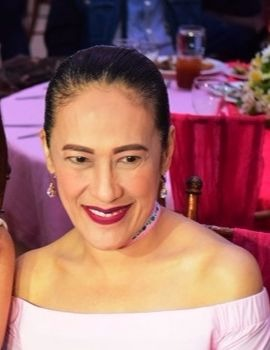
Delas Alas in 2017

Delas Alas started her career on GMA Network back in 1991, as a host of Saturday late-night musical variety show RSVP, with Dawn Zulueta and Ariel Ureta. Delas Alas co-hosted GMA noontime shows Lunch Date (1991–93), SST: Salo-Salo Together (1993–95) and Eat Bulaga! (2000). She was a member of the cast of GMA sitcoms Ibang Klase with Joey De Leon, Jessa Zaragoza, Mark Anthony Fernandez and Aiza Seguerra in 1997–98, and 1 for 3 with Vic Sotto and Rosanna Roces between 1999 and 2001.

Delas Alas moved to ABS-CBN in 2000 and she has acted in several films, including Ang Tanging Ina from Star Cinema, which became the highest-grossing film of 2003 and the highest-grossing Filipino film until 2006. It was followed by more comedy films like Volta where she played a superhero, which spun off into a television series. In the noon-time television show MTB: Ang Saya Saya she was one of the lead hosts. In prime-time teleseries, she played an important role in the TV remake of Bituing Walang Ningning as Dorina's mother. She has also acted in the films Ang Cute Ng Ina Mo, Ang Tanging Ina N'yong Lahat and Pasukob.

She also released her first album on Star Music, entitled Ang Tanging Ina Nyo; this featured six novelty tunes. During the November 9 episode of ASAP 19, she premiered her song "Nandito Lang Ako", and revealed that she would be going under the stage name of ADA.

=== Return to GMA Network (2015–present) ===
After almost two decades of working with ABS-CBN, delas Alas decided to return to GMA Network, signing a two-year exclusive contract. One of the deciding factors for her move was the lack of projects for her from the Kapamilya Network. Her last show on ABS-CBN was the remake of Dyesebel alongside Anne Curtis.

Her return was celebrated in the Sunday-noontime show Sunday All Stars, where she was warmly welcomed as the newest Kapuso. As her first project, Delas Alas joined the cast of GMA's Telebabad series Let The Love Begin, in which she played the mother of Ruru Madrid. The show's final episode aired on August 7, 2015.

Delas Alas is also one of the main hosts and comedians in the newest Sunday afternoon comedy variety show Sunday PinaSaya, alongside Marian Rivera and the comedy duo Jose Manalo and Wally Bayola. Sunday PinaSaya challenged its rival variety show, ASAP of ABS-CBN. Delas Alas is also one of the hosts of GMA Network's celebrity talk show CelebriTV, which replaced the longest-running celebrity talk show Startalk. She hosts this alongside Joey De Leon, Lolit Solis, and Ricky Lo. The show premiered on September 19, 2015.

Aside from television shows in the Kapuso Network, Delas Alas also joined international shows in Canada and the United States through GMA Pinoy TV. She was one of the guests in the 10th anniversary of GMA Pinoy TV.

After the successful Enteng ng Ina Mo with Vic Sotto in 2011, delas Alas and Sotto reappeared in the romantic comedy My Bebe Love, released in December 2015. Directed by Jose Javier Reyes, it features the Eat Bulaga! love team of Alden Richards and AlDub (Maine Mendoza).

In June 2020, Delas Alas signed a contract with GMA Artist Center.

=== 2017–2025, GMA Records ===
In November 2017, delas Alas signed a contract with GMA Records and released a single titled "Walang Pinipili".

== Controversy ==
=== Quezon City persona non grata declaration ===
Ai-Ai delas Alas was declared a persona non grata after a resolution approved on June 7, 2022. The Quezon City Council stated that delas Alas along with the controversial director Darryl Yap have defaced the Quezon City's triangular seal in a video posted on Yap's Vincentiments Facebook Page. The resolution noted that City's seal was defaced due to the additions of the initials "BBM" and "Sara", which referred to President-Elect Bongbong Marcos and Vice-president Elect Sara Duterte. Both of whom supported the mayoral campaign of Mike Defensor in Quezon City. The video was initially posted as a campaign video for Mike Defensor who ran and lost against the incumbent mayor, Joy Belmonte. Lagman noted that the Quezon City seal has been the official coat of arms of the city since it was approved by the Office of the President and adopted by the City Council on February 3, 1997, through Resolution No. 10320, S-1975.

One of the provincial board members said that this resolution, contrary to what happens in general, is not aimed at prohibiting Ai-Ai from the locality but it has been passed for expressing the official sentiment towards her.

The camp of Ai-Ai delas Alas condemned the resolution and said that it "endangers the protection granted by the freedom of expression for artists, entertainers, content creators, and comedians who use satire or parody to express sentiments or criticize public acts or figures".

== Other ventures ==
=== Film producer ===
Delas Alas has produced some of the films in which she has starred.

==== List of films co-produced by Ai-Ai delas Alas ====
1. Enteng ng Ina Mo, co-produced by ABS-CBN Film Productions, Inc., M – Zet TV Productions, Inc., OctoArts Films and APT Entertainment; with Vic Sotto
2. Sisterakas, co-produced by ABS-CBN Film Productions, Inc. and Viva Films; with Vice Ganda and Kris Aquino
3. Kung Fu Divas, co-produced by ABS-CBN Film Productions, Inc., Reality Entertainment and The O&Co. Picture Factory; with Marian Rivera, who was also a producer of the film.

=== MEDA Productions ===
Martina Eileen Delas Alas Productions, also known as MEDA Productions, is a film production company in the Philippines managed by delas Alas.

==== Theatrical featured films of MEDA Productions ====
1. My Bebe Love #KiligPaMore (December 25, 2015) co-produced by OctoArts Films, M – Zet TV Productions, Inc., APT Entertainment and GMA Films; starring Vic Sotto, Ai-Ai delas Alas, Alden Richards and Maine Mendoza

=== Talent manager ===
Ai-Ai delas Alas was the manager of the Filipino hiphop collective Ex Battalion for a brief period of time, from June 2018 to May 2019.

The former manager reportedly relinquished her role to the group's original leader, Mark Maglasang due to the unprofessional and disobedient attitude of most of the members. According to her, she has been putting up with their behavior for 9 months already, characterize by the continuous absence in meeting sessions and disrespectful behavior displayed by other members when reprimanded. "I can only do so much. If they want their group to prosper, then I guess they must change themselves first. I can't help them if they won't help themselves", she insisted.

== Filmography ==
=== Film ===
Year	Title	Role
1985	Sana Kahit Minsan	Jenny Mae
1987	Dalawang Larawan ng Pag-ibig	Kris Ananie
1987	Mga Syanong Parak	Lalang
1988	Regal Shocker: The Movie	Marida
1989	Gawa Na ang Bala para sa Akin	Miss Sy Go Row
1989	Wooly Booly: Ang Classmate Kong Alien	
1989	Romeo Loves Juliet (But Their Families Hate Each Other)	
1990	Rocky n' Rolly	
1990	Bakit Kay Tagal ng Sandali?	
1990	Ang Titser Kong Alien: Wooly Booly II	
1991	Underage Too	Yaya Kristina
1991	Shake, Rattle & Roll III	Dezzi Rae
1992	Shake, Rattle & Roll IV	Astrude
1992	Guwapings: The First Adventure	Vivian
1993	Bulag, Pipi at Bingi	Cinderella
1994	Separada	Cookie
1994	Koronang Itim	Luigi
1994	Mars Ravelo's Darna! Ang Pagbabalik	
1997	Computer Kombat	Mama Tasining
1997	Isang Tanong, Isang Sagot	Kiry
1998	It's Cool Bulol	
1998	Kasal-Kasalan (Sakalan)	Hillary
1999	Ms. Kristina Moran, Ang Babaeng Palaban	Ms. Kristine Moran
1999	Kiss Mo 'Ko	Pola
2000	Bakit Ba Ganyan? (Ewan Ko nga ba, Darling)	
2001	Booba	Gretchen/Madame X
2003	Ang Tanging Ina	Ina Montecillo
2003	Pakners	Maui
2003	Pinay Pie	Yolly
2004	Volta	Perla Magtoto/Volta
2005	Shake, Rattle & Roll 2k5	Ispiritista
2006	Kapag Tumibok Ang Puso: Not Once, But Twice	Lovely "Love" den Laden
2007	Ang Cute Ng Ina Mo	Georgia Quizon
2007	Pasukob	Julia Rose San Miguel
2008	Ikaw Pa Rin: Bongga Ka Boy!	Dra. Baby Holmes
2008	Ang Tanging Ina N'yong Lahat	President Ina Montecillo / Madam
2009	BFF: (Best Friends Forever)	Frances
2009	Ang Tanging Pamilya: A Marry Go Round	Sunshine Sicat
2010	Noy	Herself/Cameo
2010	Ang Tanging Ina Mo (Last na 'To!)	Ina Montecillo / Madam
2011	Who's that Girl?	John Eduque Sr.'s mistress
2011	Enteng Ng Ina Mo	Ina Montecillo / Madam
2012	Sisterakas	Bernadette "Detty" Sabroso Maningas
2013	Bromance: My Brother's Romance	Ghost in the mausoleum
2013	Kung Fu Divas	Charlotte/Lyna
2014	Past Tense	2034 Rosabelle "Belle" Garcia/2014 Beh
2014	Ronda	Paloma Arroyo
2015	La Amigas	Victoria "Vicky" Verallo
2015	My Bebe Love: KiligPaMore	Corazon "Cora" Talatala
2016	Area	Hillary
2017	Our Mighty Yaya	Yaya Virgie
2017	Bes and the Beshies	Charla
2019	S.O.N.S: Sons of Nanay Sabel	Sabel Dela Cruz
2019	School Service	
2019	Feelenial: Feeling Millennial	Madam Bato-Bato
2019	And Ai, Thank You	Aileen "Ai" dela Rosa
2019	3pol Trobol: Huli Ka Balbon!	Mary Balbon
2020	D'Ninang	Mercedita "Ditas / Ninang" Vicente
2021	Kaka	Caller
2023	Litrato	Lola Edna
2026	Batang Paco	

=== Television ===
Year	Title	Role(s)
1989	Palibhasa Lalake	Elma
1991–1995	R.S.V.P.	Herself/Host
1991–1993	Lunch Date	Herself/Co-host
1994–1995	SST: Salo-Salo Together	Herself/Co-host
1995–2000	Eat Bulaga	Herself/Host
1997–2001	1 for 3	Tamulite aka "Tam"
1999	Comedy Central Market	Herself/Host
2000	Sing Galing!	Herself/Host
2000–2015; 2026–present	ASAP XP	Herself/Co-host/Performer
2000–2005	MTB	Herself/Co-host
2000–2003	Arriba, Arriba!	Venus Arriba
2000	Judy Ann Drama Special: Talak, Halahak, Palakpak	
2001–2004	Whattamen	Tita Vicky
2003–2005	Ang Tanging Ina	Ina Macaspac/Ina Montecillo
2004	Morning Star	Herself/Host
2005–2006	Entertainment Konek	Herself/Host
2005–2006	My Juan and Only	Mercy
2006	Bituing Walang Ningning	Adora Pineda
2006–2007	Super Inggo	Bugan "Halimaw sa Banga"
2007	Princess Sarah	Rama Dass
2008	Volta	Perla Magtoto/Volta
2008–2009	I Love Betty La Fea	Julia Pengson/Julia Tingson
2009	Ruffa & Ai	Herself/Co-host
2009–2010	May Bukas Pa	Delilah
2009–2010	Agimat: Ang Mga Alamat ni Ramon Revilla Presents: Pepeng Agimat	Gloring Dimaanta
2010–2013	Pilipinas Got Talent	Herself/Judge
2010	M3: Malay Mo Ma-develop	Kring Kring
2011	Maria la del Barrio	Casilda Dimaculangan
2011–2012	My Binondo Girl	Zenaida "Zheny" Dimaguiba-Sy
2012	Wako Wako	Dyosa Marishka
2013	Wansapanataym Presents: Moomoo Knows Best	Joanna
2013	TodaMax	Vangie "Ate Van" Batumbakal
2014	Mars Ravelo's Dyesebel	Banak
2015	Magpakailanman: Mga Anak ng Asawa Ko	Leda
2015	Let the Love Begin	Jenina "Jeni" Magtanggol-Pontenciano/DJ Jeni/DJ Bebeyoncé
2015–2019	Sunday PinaSaya	Herself/Host
2015–2016	CelebriTV	Herself/Host
2015–2016	KalyeSerye	Doña Barbara "Lola Babah" Laticia Rockefeller Viuda de Faulkerson
2016	Lip Sync Battle Philippines	Himself/Guest Performer
2016	Yan ang Morning!	Herself/Special Guest
2016	Superstar Duets	Herself/Guest Performer
2016	Magpakailanman: Anak Saan Kami Nagkamali	Mercy
2016	Laff, Camera, Action!	Herself/Come-director
2016–2017	Hay, Bahay!	Lav
2017	Trops	Rosa Mystica Carpio De Roxas
2017	Road Trip	Herself/Guest
2017	Wowowin	Herself/Guest
2017	Super Ma'am	Barbie
2017–2018	Bossing & Ai	Herself/Host
2017	Magpakailanman: Ang Nanay ng Kalsada	Emy
2017	Road Trip: Palawan	Herself/Guest
2018	Sherlock Jr.	Perla Calubaquib
2018	7 Last Words	Herself / Fourth Word Testimony Sharer
2018	Magpakailanman: My Nanay & I	Elisa
2018	All Star Videoke	Herself/Guest
2018	#MichaelAngelo: Lenten Special	The Boss
2018–present	The Clash	Herself/Judge
2018	Lip Sync Battle Philippines	Herself/Battler
2019	Daddy's Gurl	Amor Flowers
2019	Kara Mia	Reynara
2020; 2022	All-Out Sundays	Herself/Guest
2021	Owe My Love	Vida Morales
2022	Raising Mamay	Leticia "Letty/Mamay" Reyes-Sandejas
2023–present	It's Showtime	Herself/Guest
2025	Mga Batang Riles	Elma
2025	Bubble Gang	Herself/Guest

== Awards and nominations ==
Year	Association	Awards and Nominations	Result
2017	31st PMPC Star Awards for Television	Best Comedy Actress (Hay, Bahay!)	Won
2017	48th GMMSF Box-Office Entertainment Awards	Global Achievement by a Filipino Artist (Queens New York – Best Female Actor)	Won
2017	7th Queens World Film Festival	Best Female Actor (Area)	Won
2016	6th EdukCircle Awards	Most Influential Film Actress of the Year (My Bebe Love)	Won
2016	47th Guillermo Mendoza Memorial Scholarship Foundation	Box-Office Queen (My Bebe Love)	Won
2015	41st Metro Manila Film Festival	Best Actress (My Bebe Love)	Nominated
2015	38th Gawad Urian Awards	Best Actress (Ronda)	Nominated
2013	44th Guillermo Mendoza Memorial Scholarship Foundation	Phenomenal Box Office Stars (with Kris Aquino and Vice Ganda – Sisterakas)	Won
2013	PMPC Star Awards for Movies	Darling of the Press	Nominated
2012	43rd Guillermo Mendoza Memorial Scholarship Foundation	Phenomenal Box Office Stars (with Vic Sotto – Enteng ng Ina Mo)	Won
2012	PMPC Star Awards for Movies	Darling of the Press	Nominated
2012	PMPC Star Awards for Movies	Movie Actress of the Year (Enteng ng Ina Mo)	Nominated
2012	43rd GMMSF Box-Office Entertainment Awards	Comedy Box-Office Tandem (Enteng ng Ina Mo) with (Vic Sotto)	Won
2011	42nd GMMSF Box-Office Entertainment Awards	Box-Office Queen (Ang Tanging Ina Mo (Last na 'To!))	Won
2011	PMPC Star Awards for TV	Female Face of the Night	Won
2011	9th Gawad Tanglaw	Presidential Jury Award	Won
2011	36th Metro Manila Film Festival Philippines	Best Actress (Enteng ng Ina Mo)	Nominated
2011	FAP Awards	Best Actress (Ang Tanging Ina Mo (Last na 'To!))	Nominated
2011	Golden Screen Awards	Best Performance by an Actress in a Leading Role (Musical or Comedy) (Ang Tanging Ina Mo (Last na 'To!))	Nominated
2011	PMPC Star Awards for TV	Best Comedy Actress (M3: Malay Mo Ma-develop)	Won
2011	25th PMPC Star Awards for TV	Best Single Performance by an Actress (Maalaala Mo Kaya: Krus)	Won
2011	59th FAMAS Awards	Best Actress (Ang Tanging Ina Mo (Last na 'To!))	Won
2011	41st Guillermo Mendoza Memorial Scholarship Foundation	Box-Office Queen (Ang Tanging Ina Mo (Last na 'To!))	Won
2011	27th PMPC Star Awards for Movies	Movie Actress of the Year (Ang Tanging Ina Mo (Last na 'To!))	Won
2010	36th Metro Manila Film Festival Philippines	Best Actress (Ang Tanging Ina Mo (Last na 'To!))	Won
2009	Golden Screen Awards	Best Performance by an Actress in a Leading Role (Musical or Comedy) (Ang Tanging Ina N'yong Lahat)	Nominated
2009	FAP Awards	Best Actress (Ang Tanging Ina N'yong Lahat)	Nominated
2009	40th Guillermo Mendoza Memorial Scholarship Foundation	Comedy Box-Office Queen	Won
2008	22nd Star Awards for Television	Best Comedy Actress	Nominated
2008	24th PMPC Star Awards for Movies	Movie Actress of the Year (Ang Cute ng Ina Mo)	Won
2007	21st PMPC Star Awards for TV	Best Drama Actress (Bituing Walang Ningning)	Nominated
2004	20th PMPC Star Awards for Movies	Best Actress (Ang Tanging Ina)	Won
2004	52nd FAMAS Awards	Best Actress (Ang Tanging Ina)	Nominated
2004	PMPC Star Awards for TV	Best Gameshow Host (Sing Galing!)	Won
2004	PMPC Star Awards for Television	Best Comedy Actress (Ang Tanging Ina)	Won
2003	PMPC Star Awards for TV	Best Comedy Actress (Whattamen)	Won
2003	35th Guillermo Mendoza Memorial Scholarship Foundation	Box-Office Queen (Ang Tanging Ina)	Won
2002	PMPC Star Awards for TV	Best Comedy Actress (Whattamen)	Won
2000	PMPC Star Awards for Television	Best Gameshow Host (Sing Galing!)	Won
1999	Star Awards for Television	Best Comedy Actress (Ibang Klase)	Won

Year	Award giving body	Category	Nominated work	Results
1998	PMPC Star Awards for Television	Best Comedy Actress	—N/a	Won
2000	PMPC Star Awards for Television	Best Game Show Host (shared with Allan K.)	Sing Galing!	Won
