= Mandirigma =

- Directed by: Arlyn dela Cruz
- Screenplay by: Arlyn dela Cruz
- Produced by: Arlyn dela Cruz
- Starring: Luis Alandy; Ping Medina; Alwyn Uytingco; Marc Solis; Victor Basa; Carlo Cruz; Jerico Estregan; Ken Anderson; Jeffrey Marquez; Mon Confiado
- Cinematography: Marvin Reyes; Joseph Delos Reyes
- Edited by: Mark Jason Sucgang
- Music by: Christian Jumarang
- Production companies: Blank Pages Productions; Starquest Alliance Production
- Release date: December 17, 2015
- Country: Philippines

Mandirigma (lit. 'warrior') is a 2015 Philippine military drama film produced, written and directed by Arlyn dela Cruz and co-produced by Blank Pages Productions and Starquest Alliance.

== Plot ==
Arlan Salcedo (Luis Alandy), a lieutenant in the Philippine Marine Corps gets promoted to captain after an operations in 2006. In 2014, he encounters the same group of enemies now armed with better equipment and training.

== Cast ==
- Luis Alandy as Capt. Arlan Salcedo
- Mon Confiado as Hamda Marawan
- Ping Medina
- Alwyn Uytingco
- Marc Solis
- Victor Basa
- Carlo Cruz
- Jerico Estregan
- Ken Anderson
- Alvin Fortuna
- Roland Inocencio
- Dennis Coronel

== Production ==
Mandirigma is a co-production of Blank Pages Productions and Starquest Alliance with journalist Arlyn dela Cruz as its producer, writer and director. Work for the script for the film began in October 2014 and was finished by December of the same year. Filming took place at Camp Gregorio Lim in Cavite. Actor Derek Ramsay was originally offered the lead role, but due to scheduling conflicts the role was instead given by Luis Alandy in February 2015.

The film is centered around the Philippine Marine Corps. Dela Cruz, a journalist herself, has covered the operations of the marines since the early 1990s and promised that the fighting depicted in the film will be "as close as possible to an actual battle". She is aided by a group of marines, most who are members of the Reconnaissance Force, as technical advisors.

The film is said to be inspired from the Mamasapano clash which involved the police's Special Action Force. This claim was denied by de la Cruz who pointed out that the script was finished prior to the incident. She added that the main antagonist of the film was Malaysian militant Zulkifli Abdhir, who is known for his alias Marwan and was involved in the certain operation.

== Release ==
Mandirigma was premiered on December 17, 2015, as one of the New Wave entries of the 2015 Metro Manila Film Festival.
