= Bromance: My Brother's Romance =

- Theatrical movie poster
- Directed by: Wenn V. Deramas
- Screenplay by: Ays de Guzman; Danno Kristoper C. Mariquit; Wenn V. Deramas
- Story by: Joel M. Mercado; Enrico C. Santos; Kriz G. Gazmen; Ays de Guzman; Danno Kristoper C. Mariquit
- Produced by: Charo Santos-Concio; Malou N. Santos; Enrico C. Santos
- Starring: Zanjoe Marudo; Cristine Reyes
- Cinematography: Elmer Haresco Despa
- Edited by: Marya Ignacio
- Music by: Vincent de Jesus
- Production companies: ABS-CBN Film Productions; Skylight Films
- Distributed by: Star Cinema
- Release date: May 15, 2013
- Country: Philippines
- Language: Filipino
- Box office: ₱163.5 million

Bromance: My Brother's Romance is a 2013 Filipino screwball comedy satire film co-written and directed by Wenn V. Deramas. The story and screenplay written by various writers including Kriz G. Gazmen and Joel Mercado was based on a true story. Starring Zanjoe Marudo and Cristine Reyes, with the supporting cast include Arlene Muhlach, Nikki Valdez, Maricar de Mesa, and Joy Viado, the film revolves around twin brothers Brando and Brandy but when the latter was put into a coma, the former is forced to impersonate himself as his gay twin brother.

Produced by Skylight Films in its first foray into the comedy genre and distributed by Star Cinema, the film was theatrically released on May 15, 2013.

== Plot ==
From their birth to adulthood, Brando always despises Brandy, his gay twin brother, and he has been his burden throughout his life, with factors including that he was mistaken for the latter by everyone. The two later became estranged when Brando started an altercation with Brandy and was later expelled from the house. Eight years have passed and Brando lives with his two friends at a boarding house and they run a repair service for broken appliances. However, with a debt of 1.5 million pesos, Brando has been given a deadline of 30 days by Delilah and he has to choose two options: pay the debt or marry her. Meanwhile, Brandy has become a successful interior designer and was awarded a contract from his client, Mr. Big, who wanted him and his two fellow designers, Beergin and Tequi, to design his mausoleum.

== Cast ==
=== Main cast ===
- Zanjoe Marudo as:
  - Brando San Juan, the straight of the twins who was later forced to impersonate his gay twin
  - Brandy San Juan, Brando's gay twin brother who works as a successful interior designer
- Cristine Reyes as Erika, Brandy's best friend, and Brando's girlfriend

=== Supporting cast ===
- Arlene Muhlach as Vangie San Juan, Brando and Brandy's mother
- Boom Labrusca as Arn-Arn
- Manuel Chua as Jerome
- Joey Paras† as Beergin, the first of Brandy's two co-designers
- Lassy Marquez as Tequi, the second of Brandy's two co-designers
- Atak Araña as Mr. Big, the owner of the columbarium
- Joy Viado† as Delilah, an ugly-looking woman who wants to marry Brando in exchange for his 1.5 million pesos worth of incurred debts.
- Maricar de Mesa as Joyce San Juan, Brando and Brandy's older sister
- Abby Bautista as Abby San Juan, Brando and Brandy's niece and Joyce and Joey's daughter
- Nikki Valdez as Britney
- Carlo Romero as Rico, Brandy's former boyfriend
- Jeff Luna as Joey San Juan, Brando and Brandy's brother-in-law

=== Special participation ===
- Maliksi Morales as Young Brandy/Brando
- Kokoy De Santos as Teen Brandy/Brando
- Beauty Gonzalez as Young Vangie
- Ai-Ai Delas Alas as the Columbarium Ghost
- Kris Aquino as the Doctor
- Vice Ganda as the Wedding Gatecrusher/Stopper
- Bea Alonzo as the Wedding Guest, Britney's (Nikki Valdez) friend
- John Lloyd Cruz as Z the Seminarian

== Reception ==
=== Rating ===
The film was graded "B" by the Cinema Evaluation Board and rated PG by MTRCB.

=== Box Office ===
Bromance: My Brother's Romance landed on No. 2 on its opening weekend beaten by Star Trek Into Darkness on a small margin. Bromance earned P32,334,475 on its first 5 days of showing. After 3 weeks of showing, it grossed P74,511,438.
