= Carlos Morales (actor) =

Filipino actor and director

- Born: Carlin Craig Woodruff Jr. January 5, 1976 (age 50); Olongapo, Zambales, Philippines
- Occupation: Actor
- Years active: 1990–present

Carlin Craig Woodruff Jr., known by his stage name Carlos Morales, is a Filipino actor and director.

== Personal life ==
Morales was born in Olongapo City, Philippines to Lilia and Carlin Woodruff and is the youngest of four children. His father was an American Navy serviceman previously based in Subic. When he was six years old, his parents separated and has since both remarried.

Morales attended high school at St. Joseph in Olongapo. He attended Centro Escolar University before transferring to San Sebastian College, where he finished his third year as a broadcasting major. He also attended Sacramento City College to study Nursing.

== Career ==
Morales' performance in the Philippine Educational Theater Association play Mga Pusang Gala won him the lead role in the 2000 film Laro sa Baga. In the same year he appeared in the film Most Wanted and top-billed the horror flick Woman of Mud.

In 2008, Morales played the Incredible Hunk in the superhero comedy series Volta.

Piring, a film written and directed by Morales, won the Best Screenplay award and was dubbed second Best Picture in the 2nd World Premieres Film Festival in 2015.

== Filmography ==
=== Television ===
Year	Title	Role	Notes	Source
1990-96	That's Entertainment	Himself/host		
2001-2003	Recuerdo de Amor	Ramoncito "Monching" Stuart Villafuerte		
2008	Volta	Incredible Hunk		
2008-2009	Dyosa	Tadaklan		
2009	Rosalinda	Jose Fernando Altamirano		
2010	Precious Hearts Romances Presents: Alyna	Digo		
2012	Luna Blanca	Devolas / Diego Montecines		
2012	Maalaala Mo Kaya	Raul	Episode: "Manika"	
2013-14	Galema: Anak ni Zuma	Philip Castillo		
2014	Wattpad Presents: Butler Boy	Butler Boy		
2016	Ang Probinsyano	Anton		
2016	Maalaala Mo Kaya	Rafael	Episode: "Riles"	
2016	Karelasyon	Edward	Episode: "Dalawang Mukha"	
2017	Maalaala Mo Kaya	Tito Roland	Episode: "Autograph"	
2017	Wildflower	Romulo		
2018	Maalaala Mo Kaya	Vhinez's father	Episode: "Pilat"	
2019	Maalaala Mo Kaya	Arlando	Episode: "Pregnancy Test"	

=== Film ===
Year	Title	Role	Notes	Source
2000	Laro sa Baga	Ding		
2000	Woman of Mud	Mark	Original title: "Babaeng Putik"	
2001	Onsehan	Richard		
2012	El Presidente	Gen. Leon Villafuerte		
2015	Piring	Director / Writer	Credited as "Craig Woodruff Jr."	

== Awards and nominations ==
Year	Work	Award	Category	Result	Source
2000	Laro sa Baga	Gawad Urian Awards	Gawad Urian for Best Actor	Nominated	
2000	Laro sa Baga	PMPC Star Awards for Movies	Movie Actor of the Year	Won	
2015	Piring	World Premieres Film Festival	Best Screenplay	Won	
2015	Piring	World Premieres Film Festival	Best Picture	Nominated	

=== Theater ===
Year	Title	Role	Notes	Source
1999	Mga Pusang Gala		Philippine Educational Theater Association (PETA) Theater	
