= Volta (film) =

- Theatrical release poster
- Directed by: Wenn V. Deramas
- Written by: Mel Mendoza-Del Rosario; Artemio Abad
- Based on: Characters created by: Raymond Diamzon; Francis Xavier Pasion
- Produced by: Tess V. Fuentes
- Starring: Ai-Ai delas Alas; Diether Ocampo; Onemig Bondoc; Bobby Andrews; Jean Garcia; Justin Cuyugan; Eugene Domingo; Pauleen Luna; Chokoleit; Mura
- Cinematography: Sherman Philip T. So
- Edited by: Vito Cajili
- Music by: Jessie Lasaten
- Production companies: ABS-CBN Film Productions, Inc.
- Distributed by: Star Cinema
- Release date: June 23, 2004
- Running time: 94 minutes
- Country: Philippines
- Language: Filipino
- Box office: ₱60 million

Volta is a 2004 action-adventure-comedy film directed by Wenn V. Deramas and starring Ai-Ai delas Alas as Volta. It was released under Star Cinema, ABS-CBN Film Productions. The story concerns an ordinary woman who was given the power of electricity and used this gift for the common good by becoming a caped crusader donning a red suit. The film served as the inspiration for 2008 TV series of the same name, albeit a different setting, storyline and a more comedic tone.

== Plot ==
Perla, a dressmaker who works for her siblings Percy and Penny, discovers she has superpowers after being struck by lightning three times. These powers, which allow her to generate heat and electricity with her hands, lead her to become the superhero Volta. Despite her siblings' resentment, especially Percy and blaming her powers for past mishaps, Perla finds guidance and encouragement from Ama, a ball of light with a human face. Ama teaches Perla to use her powers for good and manage them effectively.

Volta's main antagonist, Celphora, aims to harness Volta's powers for her Telstra Technology. She initially sends minions to lure Volta into revealing herself. Celphora then deceives Percy by posing as a workmate to extract his sister's secret and captures him and Penny to use as bait for Volta. Celphora demands that Volta transfer her powers in exchange for her siblings' freedom. Volta complies but ultimately kills Celphora with lightning using a steel rod. This leads to her siblings understanding the importance of Volta and Perla's sacrifice, resulting in a heartfelt reconciliation.

== Cast ==
- Ai-Ai delas Alas as Perla Magtoto / Volta
- Diether Ocampo as Lloyd Ventura
- Jean Garcia as Kelly Tanjuakio / Celphora
- Justin Cuyugan as Percy Magtoto
- Bobby Andrews as Oh-Vlading
- Onemig Bondoc as Oh-Blah-Blah
- Eugene Domingo as Nancy
- Boy Abunda as Ama
- Pauleen Luna as Penny Magtoto
- Chokoleit† as Denden
- Mura as 9 Volts
- Eddie Gil as President

=== Cameo ===
- Sandara Park as herself
- Hero Angeles as himself
- Roxanne Guinoo as herself
- Joross Gamboa as himself
- Melissa Ricks as herself
- Laurenti Dyogi as himself
- JV Villar as TV reporter
- Randy Santiago as MTB host
- Mickey Ferriols as MTB host
- Piolo Pascual (from Milan)
- Claudine Barretto (from Milan)
- Hazel Ann Mendoza as young Perla
- John Manalo as young Percy
- Moreen Guesse as young Penny
