= Ang Tanging Ina Mo: Last Na 'To! =

2010 film by Wenn V. Deramas

- Theatrical movie poster
- Directed by: Wenn V. Deramas
- Written by: Mel Mendoza-del Rosario
- Based on: Characters created by Mel Mendoza del Rosario and Keiko Aquino
- Produced by: Charo Santos-Concio; Malou Santos
- Starring: Ai-Ai delas Alas; Eugene Domingo; Marvin Agustin; Nikki Valdez; Carlo Aquino; Alwyn Uytingco; Marc Acueza; Shaina Magdayao; Serena Dalrymple; Jiro Manio; Yuki Kadooka; Xyriel Manabat
- Cinematography: Sherman Philip T. So
- Edited by: Marya Ignacio
- Music by: Jessie Lasaten
- Production company: ABS-CBN Film Productions, Inc.
- Distributed by: Star Cinema
- Release date: December 25, 2010
- Running time: 105 minutes
- Country: Philippines
- Language: Filipino
- Budget: ₱20 million
- Box office: ₱210 million

Ang Tanging Ina Mo: Last Na 'To! (roughly "Your One and Only Mother: This is the Last One!") is a 2010 Filipino comedy drama film starring an ensemble cast led by Ai-Ai delas Alas and Eugene Domingo. An official entry for the 2010 Metro Manila Film Festival, it is the third and final main installment of the Ang Tanging Ina series.

== Plot ==
Following her resignation from the presidency, Ina Montecillo enjoys retirement with a private staff, occasional media coverages and her family now with grandchildren. Her best friend Rowena marries one of Ina’s personal bodyguards and is now expecting a child. However, at President Constantino’s wedding, Ina collapses and hits her head. She undergoes an X-ray to assess the injury but the doctor identifies a brain tumor and estimates that she has less than a year to live. Devastated by the news, Ina decides not to tell her children about it but instead quietly puts her affairs into order. She is “haunted” around the same time by men who appear identical to her late husbands.

Meanwhile, Seven is planning her wedding with her new fiancé William whom Ina is reluctant to accept due to his unattractive appearance. Pip discovers he has a daughter but is afraid to take responsibility. Tudis returns from abroad with her son after her marriage has failed. Later, Ina finds out that Juan has also returned home now unemployed and having accumulated debt with one of their neighbors. Juan and his family move back in with his mother while he searches for work before borrowing money from Tri who now has a successful office job. Rather than a joyful reunion, the siblings start quarreling over each other’s personal lives. Tensions between them eventually reach a point where Ina intervenes and finally reveals her terminal illness to them.

The children reconcile with each other to find ways to treat their mother’s condition. Tri pays off Juan’s debts (after the siblings fight Juan’s debtors) and Pip finally accepts his daughter. After refusing chemotherapy due to its cost, Ina resorts to alternative remedies for treatment but to no effect. She resigns to her fate and gathers the rest of the family for a final reunion. At her public farewell speech, Ina collapses again while helping Rowena who has gone into labor. The two are rushed to the hospital where Ina lies on her deathbed surrounded by her children. She mistakes a spotlight in the hallway for the entrance to heaven when another doctor enters the room. Having run more medical tests, the doctor informs Ina that her tumor was miraculously cured. Rowena visits shortly after and gives birth to her child.

Some time later, Rowena christens her daughter followed by Seven marrying William to whom Ina reluctantly gives her blessing. Ina is then introduced to her new bodyguard and immediately develops a crush on him before joining her family for a wedding picture.

== Cast ==
=== Main cast ===
- Ai-Ai delas Alas as Ina Montecillo
- Eugene Domingo as Rowena
- Marvin Agustin as Juan Montecillo
- Nikki Valdez as Getrudis "Tudis" Montecillo
- Carlo Aquino as Dimitri "Tri" Montecillo
- Alwyn Uytingco as Tirso "Pip" Montecillo
- Shaina Magdayao as Severina "Seven" Montecillo
- Bianca & Janella Calma as Connie & Sweet Montecillo
- Xyriel Manabat as Monay Montecillo
- Owie Boy Gapuz as Oogie Montecillo
- Kaye Abad as Jenny Montecillo
- Jon Avila as Frank
- Cecil Paz as Malena

=== Other characters ===
- Empoy Marquez as William
- Rafael Rosell as Troy
- Erika Padilla as Nora
- Ricky Rivero as Doctor 1
- Debraliz as Doctor 2
- Rubi Rubi as Doctor 3
- DJ Durano as Ryan Harold
- Bea Saw as Member of Ryan Harold's interview team
- Eagle Riggs as Dr. Mahatma
- Tonton Gutierrez as Joe/Dr. Alfredo Monteagudo
- Jestoni Alarcon as Kevin/Francisco "Kiko" Montecillo
- Dennis Padilla as Nick/Eduardo "Eddie" Montenegro

Marc Acueza, Serena Dalrymple, Jiro Manio and Yuuki Kadooka briefly reprise their roles as Six, Cate, Shammy and Ten-Ten, respectively. Cherry Pie Picache also reprises her role as President Ren Constantino in a special guest appearance. Piolo Pascual appears at the end of the film as Ina's new bodyguard Carlito. The film's director Wenn V. Deramas has a cameo appearance where he directs a scene with Tom Rodriguez in the hallway outside Ina's hospital room.

== Production ==
=== Development ===
Aside from Ai-Ai delas Alas, Eugene Domingo also returns in the last installment as Rowena. Majority of the characters reprise their roles in the film. Marvin Agustin, Kaye Abad, Nikki Valdez, Marc Acueza return in the last film after being absent in the previous sequel. Among the cast, Heart Evangelista is the only character to not appear in the final sequel due to reasons unknown. Also in this film, appearances of Ina's husbands played by Tonton Gutierrez as Alfredo, Jestoni Alarcon as Kiko, and Dennis Padilla as Eddie with the exception of Edu Manzano as Tony. Serena Dalrymple made her last appearance before her retirement after the film's release.

== Awards ==
Award-giving body	Award	Recipient	Result
36th Metro Manila Film Festival	Best Picture		Won
36th Metro Manila Film Festival	Best Festival Actress	Ai-Ai delas Alas	Won
36th Metro Manila Film Festival	Best Festival Supporting Actress	Eugene Domingo	Won
36th Metro Manila Film Festival	Best Festival Child Performer	Xyriel Manabat	Won
36th Metro Manila Film Festival	Best Festival Director	Wenn Deramas	Won
36th Metro Manila Film Festival	Best Festival Original Story	Mel del Rosario	Won
36th Metro Manila Film Festival	Best Festival Screenplay	Mel del Rosario	Won
36th Metro Manila Film Festival	Best Festival Musical Score	John Lazatin	Won
36th Metro Manila Film Festival	Gender Sensitivity Award		Won
27th PMPC Star Awards for Movies	Movie of the Year		Won
27th PMPC Star Awards for Movies	Movie Director of the Year	Wenn Deramas	Won
27th PMPC Star Awards for Movies	Movie Actress of the Year	Ai-Ai delas Alas	Won
27th PMPC Star Awards for Movies	Movie Supporting Actress of the Year	Eugene Domingo	Won
27th PMPC Star Awards for Movies	Movie Child Performer of the Year	Xyriel Manabat	Won
27th PMPC Star Awards for Movies	Movie Editor of the Year	Marya Ignacio	Won
42nd GMMSF Box-Office Entertainment Awards	Box-Office Queen	Ai-Ai delas Alas	Won
42nd GMMSF Box-Office Entertainment Awards	Most Popular Film Director	Wenn V. Deramas (with Tony Y. Reyes)	Won

== Crossover sequel ==
In 2011, there was a rumored crossover between Enteng Kabisote and Ang Tanging Ina titled Enteng ng Ina Mo. The film was an official entry for the 2011 Metro Manila Film Festival which was released on December 25, 2011. It breaks the four-day record of The Unkabogable Praybeyt Benjamin with a record of ₱110 million.

== Trivia ==
- The characters of Joe, Nick and Kevin were derived from the Jonas Brothers.
- In the wedding of President Ren Constantino, she was covered by a white cloth. This is similar to the wedding of Korina Sanchez to Mar Roxas where Sanchez was approaching the Church while covered with a white cloth.

== See also ==
- Ang Tanging Ina (film series)
- Ang Tanging Ina
