= Alwyn Uytingco =

Filipino actor

- Born: Cipriano Alwyn Sumulong Uytingco III; Quezon City, Philippines
- Education: Marist School (Marikina)
- Occupation: Actor
- Years active: 1995–present
- Agent: Star Magic (1995–2011)
- Spouse: Jennica Garcia (m. 2014; sep. 2020)
- Children: 2

Cipriano Alwyn Sumulong Uytingco III, better known as Alwyn Uytingco, is a Filipino actor.

== Early life ==
He was born in Quezon City, Philippines. He was educated at the Marist School (Marikina).

== Career ==
In 2003, Uytingco appeared as Pip in the film Ang Tanging Ina. In 2013, Uytingco was cast in the TV show Cassandra: Warrior Angel. A year later, he was cast as the titular boxer in Beki Boxer. In 2018, Uytingco appeared in the film Asuang and won the Best Actor award in the Cinema One Originals Digital Film Festival.

== Personal life ==
Uytingco married actress Jennica Garcia on February 12, 2014, and together have two daughters. They separated in 2020.

== Filmography ==
=== Television ===
Year	Title	Role	Notes	Source
1996–2006; 2025–present	ASAP	Himself	Co-Host / Performer	
1997	!Oka Tokat	Carlo	Episode: "Katulong sa Dilim"	
1997	Flames	Timmy	Episode: "I Hate Boys, I Hate Girls"; Credited as "Alwyn Uytengco"	
1997	Wansapanataym		Episode: Mahiwagang Sapatos	
1999–2010	Maalaala Mo Kaya	Various roles	Various episodes	
1999	Saan Ka Man Naroroon	Young Daniel	Guest cast	
2001	Recuerdo de Amor	teen Monching Villafuerte	Special Participation	
2001	Ang TV 2	Himself		
2002–2003	Kay Tagal Kang Hinintay	Nikolai "Nikos" Argos		
2003–2005	Bida si Mister, Bida si Misis	Jun-Jun's classmate	Recurring role	
2005	Qpids	Himself		
2006–2007	Super Inggo	Lamberto		
2006	Komiks: Da Adventures of Pedro Penduko	William		
2007	Maria Flordeluna	JC Custodio		
2007	Komiks: Pedro Penduko at ang Mga Engkantao	Topher		
2008–2013	Lokomoko			
2009	The Wedding	Clark		
2009	Lovers in Paris	Dennis		
2010	Precious Hearts Romances Presents: You're Mine, Only Mine	Robert		
2010	Precious Hearts Romances Presents: Midnight Phantom	Ryan		
2010	Laugh Out Loud	Himself		
2010–2011	Imortal	Young Julio		
2011	Babaeng Hampaslupa	Renato Ramirez		
2011	Iskul Bukol	Exequel "Chill" Balidosa		
2011	Sa Ngalan ng Ina	Alfonso Deogracias		
2011	Regal Shocker: Reunion	Arvie		
2012	Nandito Ako	Billy Parsons		
2012	Third Eye	Damian		
2012	Kapitan Awesome	Baste/Kapitan Perfect		
2013	Cassandra: Warrior Angel	Arman/Cristoff de Luna		
2013	Never Say Goodbye	young Dindo		
2014	Wattpad Presents: DyepNi	Jeff		
2014	Beki Boxer	Rocky		
2014	The Ryzza Mae Show	Himself/Guest		
2015	My Fair Lady	Narrator		
2015	Happy Truck ng Bayan	Himself/Host		
2016	Happy Truck HAPPinas	Himself/Host		
2016	HAPPinas Happy Hour	Himself/Host		
2017	Red Envelope	Abel		
2018–2019	Aja aja Tayo!	Himself/Host		
2019	Wagas	Percival	Episode: "Tarantulala Sa'yo"	
2021	Fill in the Bank	Himself/Guest Player		
2023	Can't Buy Me Love	Jared		
2024	Ang Himala ni Niño	Enzo		
2024	Wow Mali: Doble Tama!	Himself/Guest		
2024	Family Feud	Himself/Guest Player		
2025	Love At First Spike	Noel Valdez		
2026	The Secrets of Hotel 88	Roy		

=== Film ===
Year	Title	Role	Notes	Ref(s).
1996	Daddy's Angel	Tonton		
1996	Are you afraid of the Dark?	Little Boy		
1996	Ano ba talaga, Kuya?	JR		
1996	Lab en Kisses	Kokoy		
1996	Kung Kaya Mo, Kaya Ko Rin!	Junior		
1997	Amanos: Patas ang Laban	Paolo		
1997	Paano kung Wala Ka Na			
1998	Ala eh... con Bisoy Hale-Hale-Hoy! Laging panalo ang mga unggoy	April		
1998	Magandang Hatinggabi	Carlo	Segment: "Killer Van"	
1999	Tik Tak Toys: My Kolokotoys	Henyo		
2002	Got 2 Believe	young Lorenz		
2003	Anghel sa Lupa	Stephen		
2003	Ang Tanging Ina	Pip		
2003	Ang Tanging Ina N'yong Lahat	Pip		
2006	Matakot Ka sa Karma	Tristian	Segment: "Aparador"	
2006	Zsazsa Zaturnnah Ze Moveeh	Poldo		
2006	I Wanna Be Happy	Leo		
2007	Happy Hearts	Miggy		
2007	Foster Child	Gerald		
2007	Tiyanaks	Bryan		
2009	Ang Narseri	Jun		
2009	Last Supper No. 3	FX Passenger		
2009	Tarot	Sol		
2010	Slow Fade	young Domingo		
2010	Ang Tanging Ina Mo (Last na 'To!)	Pip		
2010	Paano na Kaya	Gino		
2010	Hollow	Jose Mari		
2010	Pendong	Bingo Cruz		
2010	The Leaving	Martin		
2010	Rekrut	Ben Ismael		
2010	I Do	Alemberg		
2011	Rakenrol	Junfour		
2011	Six Degrees of Separation from Lilia Cuntapay	Himself	Cameo	
2011	Pintakasi			
2011	Enteng ng Ina Mo	Pip		
2012	Mater Dolorosa	Reymond		
2013	Alfredo S. Lim (The Untold Story)	Noli		
2013	Ano ang Kulay ng mga Nakalimutang Pangarap			
2013	Ligaw			
2015	#Ewankosau saranghaeyo			
2015	Mandirigma			
2016	Higanti	Justin		
2017	Finally Found You	Ron		
2017	Deadma Walking	Wake Visitor		
2018	The Hows of Us	Bowie		
2018	Nakalimutan Ko Nang Kalimutan Ka	Bar Performer 1		
2018	Asuang	Asuang		
2018	Pang-MMK	Himself		
2021	Mang Jose	Lance (voice)		
2021	Will You Marry	Reese		
2022	Doll House	Diego		
2022	Ngayon Kaya	Justin		

== Awards and nominations ==
Year	Work	Award	Category	Result	Source
2018	Asuang	Cinema One Originals Film Festival	Best Actor	Won	
2018	Asuang	FAMAS Awards	Best Actor	Nominated	
