= The Unkabogable Praybeyt Benjamin =

2011 film by Wenn V. Deramas

Praybeyt Benjamin
- Theatrical release poster
- Directed by: Wenn V. Deramas
- Screenplay by: Keiko A. Aquino; Wenn V. Deramas
- Story by: Wenn V. Deramas
- Based on: Private Benjamin by Howard Zieff
- Produced by: Vicente Del Rosario III; Veronique Del Rosario-Corpus; Charo Santos-Concio; Malou N. Santos; Vic R. Del Rosario Jr.
- Starring: Vice Ganda; Eddie Garcia; Nikki Valdez; Jimmy Santos; Derek Ramsay; Vandolph Quizon
- Cinematography: Elmer Despa
- Edited by: Marya Ignacio
- Music by: Vincent de Jesus
- Production companies: ABS-CBN Film Productions, Inc.; Viva Films
- Distributed by: Star Cinema
- Release date: October 26, 2011
- Running time: 107 minutes
- Country: Philippines
- Language: Filipino
- Box office: ₱332 million (US$6.5 million)

Praybeyt Benjamin (also known as The Unkabogable Praybeyt Benjamin) is a 2011 Filipino action comedy parody film directed by Wenn V. Deramas. It stars Vice Ganda in the title role, alongside Eddie Garcia, Nikki Valdez, Vandolph Quizon, Derek Ramsay, and Jimmy Santos in their supporting roles. It is based on the 1980 comedy film Private Benjamin. A sequel, The Amazing Praybeyt Benjamin, was released in 2014.

Praybeyt Benjamin is the first Filipino film to break the P300 million mark in the box office. It was the highest grossing Filipino film in 2011 and the highest-grossing Filipino film of all time, until it was surpassed by Sisterakas in 2012. In 2012, Box Office Entertainment Awards awarded Vice Ganda the Phenomenal Box Office Star for his role in the film. Deramas won Most Popular Film Director and Most Popular Screenwriter awards.

== Plot ==
The Santos family has fought in almost every conflict and war in the Philippines, such as the Battle of Mactan, the Philippine Revolution, and the Second World War. In the present day, Benjamin "Benjie" Santos VIII is a dance instructor who lives with his parents and sisters, Jesamine and Anjamin. His grandfather, Benjamin "Bino" VI, unaware that he is gay, expects him to enlist in the army like his ancestors. Benjie's father, Benjamin "Ben" VII, gave up being a soldier to become a scientist and an inventor, going against his grandfather's wishes. Benjie's family left his grandfather's house and moved to a cramped house, where his father invents gadgets and unique deadly weapons, including the Utot-gun (lit. 'Fart gun'), a fan that shoots bullets, and a tiara that acts as a multiple rocket launcher. One day, relatives invite Benjie's family to his grandfather Bino's 75th birthday. At the party, his grandfather finds out Benjie is gay. The relatives tell his family to leave and never show up again. Bino declares them a disgrace to the family and disowns them.

A terrorist organization, Bandidos International, starts coordinated attacks and a civil war and kidnaps Benjie's grandfather and other high-ranking officials. The terrorist's leader, Commander Abe Sayyep, claims they have taken over the whole country. In response, the government reintroduces conscription. Benjie enlists in place of his ailing father. In the training camp, Benjie meets his platoon members and their commander, Officer Brandon Estolas, with whom Benjie becomes secretly infatuated.

Benjie's platoon initially performs poorly in training and is at risk of being dissolved. The men train at night and show improvement in the morning. A rival group, incensed with losing to Benjie's platoon during training, gets Benjie drunk and films him dancing lewdly and effeminate. The following morning, the Commanding General sees the video and orders Benjie to leave the army. As Benjie is about to leave, his friends show solidarity and also leave the army.

While traveling through a wooded area, Benjie and his friends accidentally stumble upon Bandidos International's base. They return to the army training camp to inform the Commanding General, but the official refuses to believe them. Based on the army's intelligence, the entire training camp believes the enemy base is in Tanay. However, when the soldiers arrive, they are ambushed by hundreds of terrorists. Among the dead is Benjie's rival platoon.

Meanwhile, Benjie's group returns to the enemy's base. They see the captured officials, including Benjie's grandfather and Brandon. They gain entry into the terrorist camp by dressing as women to trick the guards. Once inside, the group kills many terrorists using the inventions of Benjie's father. Benjie rescues his grandfather, Brandon, and the other generals. Benjie's grandfather thanks him and asks for forgiveness. They reunite with Benjie's group, but Abe Sayyep appears and attempts to shoot Benjie's grandfather. Benjie takes the bullet to save his grandfather. Benjie's friend, Brandon, kills Abe Sayyep.

In the afterlife, Benjie meets his ancestors, who are proud of him and say it is not yet time for him to die. Benjie comes back to life after Brandon was forced to kiss him, and the group returns home, where they celebrate their victory with a party. Benjie lets Brandon know how he feels, but he rejects him, saying he already has a fiancé. Brandon's fiancé arrives, who turns out to be a lookalike of Benjie, shocking everyone at the party.

The closing credits are interrupted by Captain Tenille telling General Santos that the president of the Philippines is summoning the country's bravest soldiers. In Europe, Benjie and his team happily accept the president's call, saying there will be a sequel.

== Cast and characters ==
=== Main cast ===
- Vice Ganda as Private Benjamin "Benjie" Santos VIII

=== Benjie's forefathers ===
- Benjamin Santos I (Benjie's ancestor who fought in the Battle of Mactan)
- Benjamin Santos II (Benjie's great-great-great-grandfather in Philippine Revolution)
- Benjamin Santos IV (Benjie's great-great-grandfather in Second World War)
- Benjamin Santos V (Benjie's great-grandfather, Benjamin "Ben" Santos VII's grandfather, Benjamin "Bino" Santos VI's father)

=== Supporting cast ===
- Eddie Garcia as Minister Marshal Benjamin "Bino" Santos VI
- Jimmy Santos as Benjamin "Ben" Santos VII
- Derek Ramsay as Commanding General Officer Brandon Estolas
- Nikki Valdez as Lucresia Alcantara
- Kean Cipriano as Emerson Ecleo
- DJ Durano as Dominador "Dondi" Rosales
- Vandolph Quizon as Buhawi Manay
- Jojit Lorenzo as Joselito "Jojo / Jose" Makapagtagpo Jr. / Jose Remescal
- Ricky Rivero† as Big Boy Carnate
- Mark Joseph Duran as Owl King

=== Recurring cast ===
- Carlos Agassi as Paul Marigma
- Bodie Cruz as George Carang
- Tutti Caringal as Ringo Daway
- Malou de Guzman as Lilibeth Santos
- Dennis Padilla as Bentot Santos
- Angelie Urquico as Jesamine Santos
- Abby Bautista as Anjemin Santos
- Tess Antonio as Lisa Santos
- Jasper Visaya as Benten Santos
- Rubi Rubi as Captain Donna Tenille
- Andrew Wolff as Commander Abu Sayaff
- Emilio Garcia as Billy Aladdin
- Romhel Valera as Primitivo

=== Special participation ===
- Luis Manzano as Ericson
- Angelica Panganiban as Voice of Herself / Brandon's Fiancé
- Yam Concepcion (cameo)

== Filming ==
Praybeyt Benjamin was filmed in the last half of 2010 and wrapped up in January 2011. The filmmakers used retro movie cameras and Fujifilm instead of modern movie cameras. It was the last movie to be made in 35mm film. The movie underwent restoration for Blu-Ray/4K release.

== Reception ==
=== Release ===
The television trailer for Praybeyt Benjamin premiered during the talk show Gandang Gabi, Vice!, announcing its release on October 12, 2011. However, during the premiere of No Other Woman, the Praybeyt Benjamin trailer indicated a delayed premiere of October 26, 2011. A home video release was made on December 16, 2011, on DVD and VCD by Viva Video and Star Home Video worldwide.

=== Rating ===
It was graded "B" by the Cinema Evaluation Board of the Philippines.

=== Box office ===
Praybeyt Benjamin opened with PHP 23.6 million in ticket sales on its first day. It broke Philippine box-office records after grossing PHP 109 million on its fourth day. After its seventh day on air, it reached the PHP 200 million mark. It broke the records set also by the previous Star Cinema-Viva Films produced film, No Other Woman.

=== Critical reaction ===
Although Praybeyt Benjamin is one of the highest-grossing of all time in the Philippines, its reviews ranged from mixed to negative. Most critics criticized the movie's overly simplistic story and outdated slapstick humor. However, many reviewers noted that the film's saving grace was the sharp comedic timing of Vice Ganda and the brilliant comic performance of Nikki Valdez.

== Sequels ==
=== The Amazing Praybeyt Benjamin ===
In November 2011, ABS-CBN News reported that a sequel was in the works and would be released as early as 2013. A later announcement made on It's Showtime revealed that the sequel would air on December 25, 2014. The Amazing Praybeyt Benjamin premiered on December 25, 2014, and was an official entry to the 40th Metro Manila Film Festival.

=== Third The Super Praybeyt Benjamin film ===
A third film was announced as part of the 46th Metro Manila Film Festival, based on its script. Vice Ganda was expected to reprise his role. However, filming for the sequel was delayed due the COVID-19 pandemic as well as uncertainties caused by the non-renewal of ABS-CBN's broadcast franchise. The film failed to meet the festival's November 30, 2020, production deadline and as not among the final ten official entries of the 46th Metro Manila Film Festival. As of 2024, the sequel still in development and no further updates made.

== Awards ==
Year	Award-Giving Body	Category	Recipient	Result
2012	GMMSF Box-Office Entertainment Awards	Phenomenal Box Office Star	Vice Ganda	Won
2012	GMMSF Box-Office Entertainment Awards	Most Popular Film Director	Wenn Deramas	Won
2012	GMMSF Box-Office Entertainment Awards	Most Popular Screenwriter	Wenn Deramas and Keiko Aquino	Won
