= Seal of Quezon City =

Filipino municipal symbol

- Adopted: February 3, 1975 (current seal)
- Motto: "Lungsod Quezon", "Pilipinas"

The Seal of Quezon City is one of the official symbols of Quezon City. The current seal used by the city, adopted in 1975, is a triangular seal with the Quezon Memorial Shrine as its primary element.

== History ==
=== Historical seal (1948-1975) ===
First official seal of Quezon City, in use from 1948 to 1975.

An earlier seal was conceptualized when Quezon City was made the national capital in 1948 through Republic Act No. 333 issued by President Elpidio Quirino. The seal was made within the same year by the Philippine Heraldry Commission and was attested by then Executive Secretary Emilio Abello. The seal featured a design of a shield divided diagonally, one field in red and the other in blue. At its center is white, oval inescutcheon bearing the profile of city founder and former President Manuel L. Quezon. The element is enclosed by a circular ring with the text "Lungsod Quezon" (lit. 'Quezon City') and "Sagisag na Opisyal" (lit. 'Official Seal') at the upper and bottom portion of the ring respectively in all caps.

=== Current seal (1975-present) ===
Acting Cultural Officer Francisco B. Alvarez suggested a redesign of the seal in a letter to then Quezon City Mayor Norberto Amoranto on August 1, 1974, describing the design and symbolism of the 1948 seal as "archaic". A design proposal was made which was endorsed by Amoranto to Luciano V. Aquino, an architect. Aquino approved the design after adding some modifications to it himself. Amoranto sent the design to the Philippine Heraldry Commission and the Office of the President for its approval. Galo Ocampo, Technical Adviser on Heraldry, recommended the design which led to the seal's approval, and Assistant Executive Secretary Roberto V. Reyes signed the approval. The City Council of Quezon City officially adopted the seal through the passage of Resolution No. 10320 S-75 on February 3, 1975.

== Description ==
Flag of Quezon City featuring the seal on a plain yellow background.

An equilateral triangle divided azure and gules superimpose the silhouette of the Quezon Memorial Monument argent with the lamp of Knowledge argent over the azure field dexter and the gavel argent over the field of gules sinister. On the apex of the triangle are three mullets or over a border agent.

The current seal which was adopted on 1975 has a form of an equilateral triangle divided into blue and red portions. The seal features the Quezon Memorial Shrine at its center, the lamp of knowledge on the blue field and a gavel on the red field. At the upper sides of the seal border is the word "Lungsod Quezon" in all caps.

The text inscribed at the bottom of the seal border also in all caps was revised at least three times. Initially the text was "Punong Bayan ng Pilipinas" (lit. 'Capital City of the Philippines') until the status of Quezon City as capital of the country was restored to Manila pursuant to Presidential Decree No. 940 of Ferdinand Marcos issued on May 7, 1976. After Quezon City was stripped of its capital city status, the text was changed to "Republika ng Pilipinas" (lit. 'Republic of the Philippines'), then to "Kalakhang Manila" (lit. 'Metro Manila') before this was change to "Pilipinas".

Additionally the stars of the seal is meant to symbolize Manuel L. Quezon's "greatness", the gavel his "incomparable leadership" and the lamp of knowledge is meant to signify the city's educational development. The colors of the seal are patterned after the Philippine flag.

Other variants of the Seal of Quezon City
1975-1976	1976-?	? (after 1976)
