= Ang Tanging Ina N'yong Lahat =

2008 Filipino comedy film

- Theatrical movie poster
- Directed by: Wenn V. Deramas
- Screenplay by: Mel Mendoza-del Rosario; Wenn V. Deramas; Kriz Gazmen
- Story by: Mel Mendoza-del Rosario; Wenn V. Deramas
- Based on: Characters created by Mel Mendoza-del Rosario, Keiko Aquino, F.M.G., Raymond Diamzon
- Produced by: Tess V. Fuentes
- Starring: Ai-Ai delas Alas; Eugene Domingo; Carlo Aquino; Alwyn Uytingco; Shaina Magdayao; Jiro Manio; Yuki Kadooka
- Cinematography: Sherman Philip T. So
- Edited by: Marya Ignacio
- Music by: Jessie Lasaten
- Production company: Star Cinema
- Distributed by: Star Cinema
- Release date: December 25, 2008
- Running time: 105 minutes
- Country: Philippines
- Language: Filipino
- Budget: ₱22 million
- Box office: ₱229.96 million (US$4.5 million)

Ang Tanging Ina N'yong Lahat (roughly "Everyone's One and Only Mother") is a 2008 Filipino comedy film directed by Wenn V. Deramas and starring Ai-Ai delas Alas and Eugene Domingo. It is the sequel to a 2003 comedy film Ang Tanging Ina. It was released on December 25, 2008, as Star Cinema's official entry to the 2008 Metro Manila Film Festival. The film also follows a 77-episode sitcom continuation, Ang Tanging Ina: The TV Series that ran from August 2003 to January 2005, with several plot developments that occurred in the series, such as the death of Ina's fourth husband Eddie (Dennis Padilla) and Ina giving birth to twins, being carried over to the rest of the films.

Ai-Ai delas Alas reprises her role Ina Montecilio. It also stars Eugene Domingo as Rowena, Carlo Aquino as Tri, Alwyn Uytingco as Pip, Shaina Magdayao as Seven, Serena Dalrymple as Cate, Jiro Manio as Shammy and Yuuki Kadooka as Ten-Ten, Heart Evangelista was not reprised her role as Por due to Transferred to GMA Network in same year.

The film grossed ₱229.96 million pesos, becoming the highest-grossing film in the Philippines in 2008.

== Plot ==
Five years after the events of the first film, Ina Montecillo is widowed once again upon the death of her fourth husband Eddie. Four of her children have since become OFWs: Juan finally marries Jenny and they migrate to New Zealand, Tudis continues her art career in Canada where she marries a house painter, Por breaks up with her boyfriend Jeffrey and becomes a missionary in India, and Six becomes a registered nurse in the United Kingdom. Ina’s eight remaining children also mature and begin supporting each other. However, Ina finds herself less involved in their lives to the point where they accidentally forget her birthday.

Determined to improve her own life, Ina goes to college as a working student. She draws the attention of her law professor Ren Constantino after making a passionate speech about the difficulties of single motherhood. After working more odd jobs to finance her education, Ina and her best friend Rowena apply for employment at Malacañang Palace where they end up as housekeepers. They try to take a picture with President Hillary Daffalong but are repeatedly halted by the Presidential Security Group. On one of their attempts, Ina accidentally discovers evidence of a plot by Vice President Bill Bilyones to assassinate the President and take her place. She fails to report the plot to President Daffalong who is fatally shot in the chest while making a public speech. With help from Rowena and the church, Ina attends the President’s funeral in disguise to publicly expose the Vice President. Bilyones decides not to immediately assume the presidency and challenges Ina to a snap election. Ina is convinced by her children to run as president and she chooses Ren Constantino as her running mate. After intense campaigning, they win the election by a landslide and a defeated Bilyones is sent to prison.

Ina’s first presidential policies to solve education and traffic problems initially go awry but her later projects are more positively received. Now Ina faces the challenges of the presidency as well as that of motherhood. Tri is now a law student trying to be his mother's political advisor. When he fails to gain her attention, Tri joins the opposition party who are secretly planning to restore Bill Bilyones to power. Pip aspires to become a celebrity but is mired in a sex scandal with another actor. Seven, who has come of age, is now dating Por's ex-boyfriend Jeffrey, much to Ina's disapproval. When Shammy gets expelled for tricking his mother into signing a contract for a gambling den near his school, Ina briefly puts aside her presidential duties to finally confront her children. However, Connie and Sweet decide to run away and are taken hostage by terrorists. Ina makes an urgent televised appeal to the terrorists' mothers who subdue the captors and help rescue the twin girls. Realizing the value of her family, Ina announces her resignation during her State of the Nation Address and transfers the presidency to Ren.

Returning to private life, Ina receives a surprise birthday party from her family to make up for her last birthday. During the credits, the new President Constantino walks through Malacañang Palace, gazing upon portraits of her predecessors before finally looking at a portrait of President Ina surrounded by her family.

== Cast ==
- Ai-Ai delas Alas as Ina Montecillo, the head of the Montecillo family who becomes the sixteenth President of the Philippines.
- Eugene Domingo as Rowena, Ina's fiercely loyal friend who becomes her presidential spokesperson.
- Carlo Aquino as Dimitri "Tri" Montecillo, Ina's third child who is a law student that moonlights as a call center supervisor.
- Alwyn Uytingco as Peter Ivan Potenciano "Pip" Montecillo, Ina's fifth child who is openly gay and aspiring to become an actor similar to Kris Aquino, celebrity daughter of President Cory Aquino.
- Shaina Magdayao as Severina "Seven" Montecillo, Ina's seventh child who helps take care of the twins Connie and Sweet, and is currently dating Por's ex-boyfriend Jeffrey despite Ina's wishes against their relationship.
- Serena Dalrymple as Catherine "Cate" Montecillo, Ina's eighth child who has since outgrown her tomboyish personality in the first film and now has an activist streak prior to her mother's presidency.
- Jiro Manio as Samuel "Shammy" Montecillo, Ina's ninth child who becomes boastful of his mother's prestige and later sets up an illegal gambling business in his school called College Tele-Karera Enterprise or CTE (a parody of the real-life 2007 ZTE-NBN scandal during the presidency of Gloria Macapagal Arroyo).
- Yuuki Kadooka as Martin "Ten-Ten" Montecillo, Ina's tenth child who communicates with his family using sign language and encourages his mother to run for president.
- Bianca & Janella Calma as Connie & Sweet Montecillo, Ina's youngest children who are twin sisters that enjoy teasing their older sister Seven.
- Gloria Diaz as President Hillary Daffalong, the fifteenth President who befriends Ina shortly before being assassinated. Her name is a combination of American actress Hilary Duff and US first lady Hillary Clinton.
- DJ Durano as Vice President Bill Bilyones, the fifteenth Vice President of the Philippines who orchestrates the assassination of President Daffalong.
- John Prats as Jeffrey Sta. Maria, Por's ex-boyfriend who is now dating Seven.
- Cherry Pie Picache as Ren Constantino, Ina's college professor who becomes her Vice President and later the seventeenth President after President Montecillo's resignation. Her name is a reference to Filipino singer-songwriter Yeng Constantino.

== Sequel ==
Ang Tanging Ina Mo: Last Na 'To!, the third and last main installment of Ang Tanging Ina film series, was released on December 25, 2010. Several cast members return, including delas Alas and Domingo, while Jon Avila and Rafael Rosell are among the new cast members. The film tells the life of Ina after she quit her position as the President of the Philippines without knowing that she is suffering from brain tumor and very afraid to tell it to her children.

== Accolades ==
Year	Award-giving body	Category	Recipient	Result
2008	Metro Manila Film Festival	Third Best Picture	Ang Tanging Ina N'yong Lahat	Won
2009	GMMSF Box-Office Entertainment Awards	Comedy Box-Office Queen	Ai Ai delas Alas	Won

== See also ==
- Ang Tanging Ina (film series)
- Ang Tanging Ina
- Ang Tanging Ina Mo: Last Na 'To!
- Enteng ng Ina Mo
