= Nikki Valdez =

Filipino actress (born 1981)

- Born: Ma. Alinica Valdez; January 25, 1981 (age 45); Manila, Philippines
- Occupations: Actress; singer; TV personality
- Years active: 1997–present
- Agent: Star Magic (1997–present)
- Spouses: Christopher Lina (m. 2007; ann. 2012); Luis Garcia (m. 2018)
- Children: 1

Ma. Alinica "Nikki" Valdez-Garcia (born January 25, 1979) is a Filipino actress and singer.

== Career ==
In the Philippine music scene she was known for a ballad titled "Meron Ba?", composed for the soundtrack of G-Mik the Movie and Trip the Movie (2002), and for starring in the lead role in the F.L.A.M.E.S (1996–2002) TV series. Valdez made her comeback to daytime television in the second installment of Precious Hearts Romances, titled Ang Lalaking Nagmahal sa Akin, after her last role in Walang Kapalit in 2007. She later worked with Kaye Abad and fellow newcomer Guji Lorenzana in Precious Hearts Romances' third installment, Somewhere in My Heart, as Amanda in 2009.

In 2010, Valdez appeared in Magkano ang Iyong Dangal? and co-starred with John Lloyd Cruz and Angel Locsin in the second book and second season of the successful TV series Imortal.

In 2012, she worked alongside Star Magic alumni and ABS-CBN actors Shaina Magdayao and Jake Cuenca and again with Magkano Ang Iyong Dangal? co-star Bangs Garcia in the top-rated afternoon soap Kung Ako'y Iiwan Mo.

== Personal life ==
Valdez was married to Filipino Canadian Christopher Lina from 2007 to 2011. They had been together since 2002 and were married in Canada through a civil union on February 14, 2007, and in a Catholic wedding in Makati on July 7, 2007. Following their marriage, she relocated with her husband to Toronto, where they had a daughter. Their daughter was born with a birth defect called symbrachydactyly. Valdez and Lina separated in 2009. She has since moved back to the Philippines following the separation. In an interview, Valdez cited the intervention of a third party in their marriage as the reason for their separation. Their divorce was finalized by a Canadian court in 2011. However, their Catholic wedding in the Philippines has yet to be annulled.

Following her divorce with Lina, Valdez had been in a relationship with ABS-CBN sales executive Luis Garcia since 2014. During their relationship's third anniversary in 2017, Garcia proposed to her while on vacation in Vigan. The two married at a private ceremony in Hong Kong on August 18, 2018.

== Filmography ==
=== Television ===
Year	Title	Role	Notes	Source
1997–2002	Home Along Da Riles	Becky Kosme		
1997	Wansapanataym		Episode: "Tres Marias"	
1997–present	ASAP	Co-host/performer		
1998	Wansapanataym		Episode: "Slow Down, Angels Crossing"	
1998	Wansapanataym	Celeste (voice)	Episode: "Celeste"	
1998–1999	Gimik	Jek-jek		
1999	Wansapanataym		Episode: "Tikitikitak"	
1999–2002	G-mik	Jek-jek		
2000	Wansapanataym		Episode: "Fountain Boy"	
2001	Tabing Ilog	Luchi		
2001	Kasaysayan TV	Herself	As VJ-AP	
2001	Wansapanataym		Episode: "Insta-Lino"	
2001	!Oka Tokat	young Eleanor / Sally	Episode: "Forest Fright"	
2003	Okey, Fine! Whatever!	Camilla		
2003–2004	Basta't Kasama Kita	Alex		
2003–2005	Ang Tanging Ina	Getrudis "Tudis" Macaspac		
2005	Okey, Fine! 'To Ang Gusto Nyo!	Camilla		
2006	Okey, Fine! OK Fine, Oh Yes!	Camilla		
2007	Walang Kapalit	Recy		
2009	Precious Hearts Romances Presents: Ang Lalaking Nagmahal Sa Akin	Vicky		
2009	Precious Hearts Romances Presents: Somewhere In My Heart	Amanda		
2010	Magkano ang Iyong Dangal?	Lizette		
2010	Kung Tayo'y Magkakalayo	Colby		
2010	Midnight DJ	Sita		
2010	Maalaala Mo Kaya	Emily	Episode: "T-shirt"	
2010	Imortal	Lydia		
2011	Maalaala Mo Kaya	Rosario	Episode: "Tulay"	
2011	Maalaala Mo Kaya	Maricel Mata	Episode: "Tap Dancing Shoes"	
2012	Kung Ako'y Iiwan Mo	Joy		
2012	It's Showtime	Herself	Guest judge	
2012	Wansapanataym	Tanya	Episode: "Da Revengers"	
2012	Wansapanataym	Analie	Episode: "Ang Kulay ng Pasko"	
2013	Wansapanataym	Doctor Melendez	Episode: "Finding Nilo"	
2013	Maalaala Mo Kaya	Inday	Episode: "Heels"	
2014	Wansapanataym	Odette Agustin	Episode: "Enchanted House"	
2014	Maalaala Mo Kaya	Eden	Episode: "Manika"	
2014	Sana Bukas pa ang Kahapon	Rocky Gomez		
2014	Ipaglaban Mo!	Ibing	Episode: "Ang Pangako Mo Sa Akin"	
2015	Flordeliza	Florida's friend		
2015	Pablo S. Gomez's Inday Bote	Mimi		
2015	Maalaala Mo Kaya	Lucy	Episode: "Banana Cue"	
2015	Ipaglaban Mo!	Connie	Episode: "Akin ang Anak Mo"	
2015	And I Love You So	Maureen Jimenez-Santiago		
2016	The Story of Us	Maritess Garcia		
2016	FPJ's Ang Probinsyano	Analynne Canlaon		
2016	Ipaglaban Mo!	Suzette	Episode: "Kasambahay"	
2016	Wansapanataym	Yeye Acosta	Episode: "Tikboyong"	
2017	Wansapanataym	Audrina	Episode: "My Hair Lady"	
2017	La Luna Sangre	Lydia	Guest role	
2017	Ipaglaban Mo!	Lenie Juliano	Episode: "Ampon"	
2018	Sana Dalawa ang Puso	Kimberly "Kim" Torres		
2018	Ipaglaban Mo!	Myrna	Episode: "Uliran"	
2019	Maalaala Mo Kaya	Anna	Episode: "Rattle"	
2019	Ipaglaban Mo!	April	Episode: "Kalaguyo"	
2020	A Soldier's Heart	Fatima Alhuraji		
2020	Bagong Umaga	Monica Magbanua		
2021	Maalaala Mo Kaya	JM Yosures's mother	Episode: "Mikropono"	
2022	Click, Like, Share	Mylene	Season 3, Episode: "Swap"	
2022	Run to Me	Mami Bebot		
2022	Flower of Evil	Melanie Santos	Guest Cast	
2022	Barangay PIE Silog: Life Guro	Herself	Guest	
2023	Teen Clash			
2023	Unbreak My Heart	Luzviminda "Luz" Keller	Supporting Cast	
2023	Pira-Pirasong Paraiso	Carlotta Barrameda	Supporting Cast	
2024	Pamilya Sagrado	Kendi Velasco		
2025	Lolong: Bayani ng Bayan	Jessabel Hermosa-Calaycay		
2025–2026	Roja	Arch. Minnie del Rosario		
2026	Blood vs Duty	Lydia Santerva		
2026	Sigabo	young Mameng Magtibay		
2026	My Bespren Emman	Deborah		

=== Film ===
Year	Title	Role	Notes	Source
1998	Muling Ibalik ang Tamis ng Pag-Ibig	Joyce		
1998	Nagbibinata	Raqui		
1998	Kay Tagal kang Hinintay	Rina		
1999	Oo Na, Mahal Na Kung Mahal	Sally		
1999	Hey Babe	Queenie		
2000	Tunay na Mahal			
2002	Got 2 Believe	Karen		
2002	Jologs	Iza's friend		
2002	Bestman: 4 Better, Not 4 Worse	May		
2003	Ang Tanging Ina	Getrudis "Tudis" Montecilio	Supporting role	
2003	Malikmata	Melody		
2004	Now That I Have You	Stefi		
2004	Bcuz of U	Margie		
2006	D'Lucky Ones!	Thea		
2009	In My Life	Mia	Supporting role	
2010	Babe, I Love You	Chrissy		
2010	Ang Tanging Ina Mo Rin (Last na 'To!)	Getrudis "Tudis" Montecilio		
2011	Forever And A Day	Steph		
2011	Wedding Tayo, Wedding Hindi	Mila		
2011	The Unkabogable Praybeyt Benjamin	Lucresia Alcantara	Supporting role	
2011	Enteng Ng Ina Mo	Getrudis "Tudis" Montecilio		
2012	The Healing	Lani		
2013	Bromance: My Brother's Romance	Britney	Supporting role	
2013	Tuhog	Faith		
2013	Bekikang: Ang Nanay Kong Beki	Samantha		
2014	Once A Princess	Myrna		
2014	Moron 5.2: The Transformation	Marife Ramos		
2015	The Amazing Praybeyt Benjamin	Lucresia Alcantara		
2016	Always Be My Maybe	Tintin's sister		
2016	That Thing Called Tanga Na	Glenda		
2017	Tatlong Bibe			
2018	Sin Island	Jobelle		
2019	Open			
2019	Isa Pa with Feelings	Stella Navarro		
2022	Family Matters	Ellen		
2022	Labyu with an Accent	Pearl		
2026	18th Rose	Tess		

=== Microdrama ===
Year	Title	Role	Notes	Source
TBA	Dead Girl Walking			

== Accolades ==
Year	Award giving body	Category	Work	Result	Ref.
2018	Cinema One Originals Digital Film Festival	Best Supporting Actress	Pang MMK	Nominated	
2022	Star Magic	Loyalty Award	25 years	Won	
2023	25th Gawad Pasado Awards	Best Supporting Actress	Family Matters	Won	
2023	FAMAS Awards	Best Supporting Actress	Family Matters	Won	
2023	46th Gawad Urian Awards	Best Supporting Actress	Family Matters	Nominated	
2023	6th Eddys Awards	Best Supporting Actress	Family Matters	Won	
2023	3rd Lustre Awards	Most Inspiring Movie Actress	Family Matters	Won	
2023	Society of Filipino Film Reviewers	Best Ensemble Performance	Family Matters	Won	
