= Wenn V. Deramas =

Filipino director and scriptwriter (1966–2016)

Wenn Deramas
- Born: Edwin Villanes Deramas; September 15, 1966
- Died: February 29, 2016 (aged 49); Quezon City, Philippines
- Resting place: Himlayang Pilipino, Tandang Sora, Quezon City, Philippines
- Other names: Wenn V. Deramas; Direk Wenn
- Education: University of Santo Tomas (BS)
- Occupations: Director, screenwriter
- Years active: 1990–2016
- Employer: ABS-CBN
- Children: 2 (adopted)

Edwin Villanes Deramas (September 15, 1966 – February 29, 2016), more commonly known as Wenn V. Deramas or "Direk Wenn", was a Filipino film and television director and screenwriter.

He is best known for directing Ang Tanging Ina (2003), and its 2008 and 2010 sequels all starring Ai-Ai delas Alas. Deramas is also known for having worked closely with comedian Vice Ganda on blockbusters such as Petrang Kabayo (2010), The Unkabogable Praybeyt Benjamin (2011), Sisterakas (2012) and Girl, Boy, Bakla, Tomboy (2013). Both the Ang Tanging Ina film series and Vice Ganda's major films with Deramas are among the highest-grossing Filipino movies of all time.

In television, Deramas is known for co-directing the 1997 drama series Mula Sa Puso (his directorial debut), and its primetime successors Saan Ka Man Naroroon (1999-2001) and Sa Dulo ng Walang Hanggan (2001-2003). All three shows starred Claudine Barretto as the female lead.

== Education and early career ==
Deramas graduated from the University of Santo Tomas (UST) with a degree in Hotel and Restaurant Management. While studying at UST, he was involved in acting and was a member of Teatro Tomasino. According to his interview with Rappler, Deramas grew up admiring actresses such as Nora Aunor and Vilma Santos as well as their directors Ishmael Bernal, Lino Brocka and Danny Zialcita among others.

Prior to his entry into show business, Deramas worked as a waiter at the Aristocrat Restaurant and was promoted to food and beverages coordinator after two years. In 1990, he worked as a production assistant for the cultural magazine show Tatak Pilipino. He also worked as a writer for the show Teysi ng Tahanan and was promoted to executive producer of the Calvento Files.

== Personal life ==
Although Deramas was openly gay, he did not believe in same-sex marriage. In a 2014 interview with PEP he stated, “Let’s give [marriage] to women and men. If it were given to us gays, you might kill yourselves.” More controversially, in the same interview, Deramas opined that the recent murder of Jennifer Laude was less of a national issue than a crime. He did not consider Laude to be a trans woman and deadnamed her before reiterating his call for justice.

Deramas previously dated actor DJ Durano who played multiple supporting roles in his movies. He adopted two children, a son and a daughter, in 2001 and 2010, respectively. In 2025, the Court of Appeals dismissed a case filed by Deramas’s biological family over the inheritance of his estate after his death in 2016. The family petitioned a DNA test for the adopted children who they claim were not “formally adopted.” However, the Court of Appeals sided with the decision of the Quezon City regional trial court that the children’s birth certificates, which bore Deramas’s name and their mother’s name, were sufficient proof of his parentage and their rights as heirs to his estate.

== Death ==
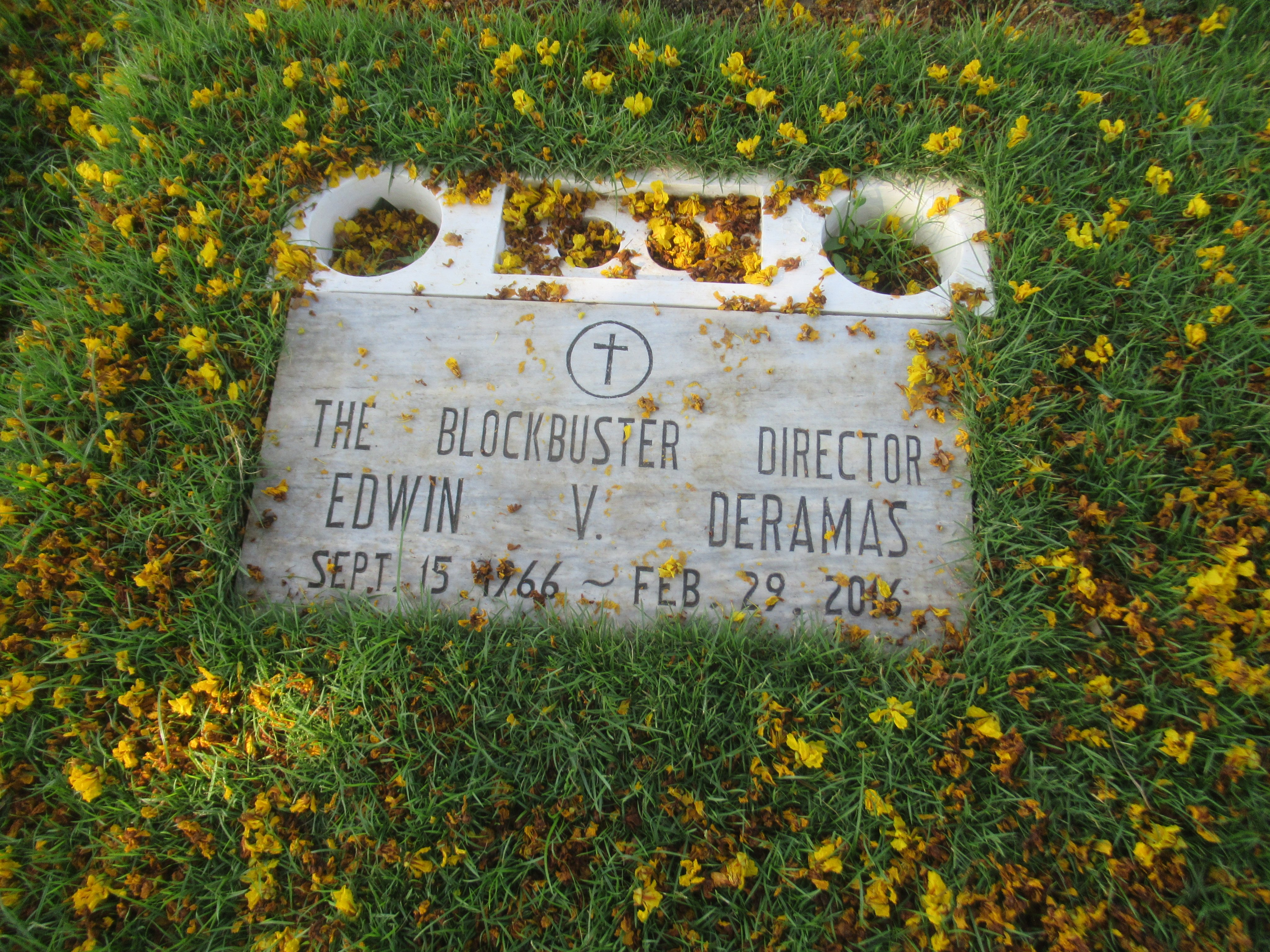
Deramas's grave at Himlayang Pilipino Memorial Park, Quezon City

In 2015, Deramas underwent angioplasty after suffering a heart attack two years prior. Deramas died at Capitol Medical Center in Quezon City on February 29, 2016. The immediate cause of death listed on his death certificate was cardiac arrest, with respiratory failure and heart attack as underlying causes. It also indicated that he suffered from aspiration pneumonia. He was buried at the Himlayang Pilipino in Tandang Sora, Quezon City on March 6, 2016, a day after the necrological services hosted by ABS-CBN at the Dolphy Theatre in the ABS-CBN Broadcasting Center, also in Quezon City.

== Filmography ==
=== As film director and writer ===
Year	Original title	English title	Credited as		Notes
Year	Original title	English title	Director	Writer	Notes
1998	Dahil Mahal na Mahal Kita	Because I Love You So Much	Yes	No	Directorial debut
1999	Mula Sa Puso: The Movie	From the Heart: The Movie	Yes	Yes	
2002	Kung Ikaw Ay Isang Panaginip	If You Are But A Dream	Yes	No	
2003	Ang Tanging Ina	The One and Only Mother	Yes	No	
2004	Volta		Yes	No	
2006		D'Lucky Ones	Yes	No	
2006	Kapag Tumibok Ang Puso: Not Once, But Twice	When the Heart Beats: Not Once, But Twice	Yes	No	
2007	Ang Cute ng Ina Mo!	Your Mother is So Cute!	Yes	Yes	
2007	Pasukob		Yes	No	
2007	Apat Dapat, Dapat Apat		Yes	No	
2008	Ikaw Pa Rin, Bongga Ka Boy!		Yes	No	
2008	Ang Tanging Ina N'yong Lahat	Everyone's One and Only Mother	Yes	No	Premiered at 2008 Metro Manila Film Festival
2009		BFF: Best Friends Forever	Yes	No	
2009	Ang Tanging Pamilya: A Marry Go Round	The One and Only Family: A Marry Go Round	Yes	No	
2010	Hating Kapatid	Sibling's Share	Yes	No	
2010	Petrang Kabayo	Petra the Horse	Yes	Yes	
2010	Ang Tanging Ina Mo: Last Na 'To!	Your One and Only Mother: This is the Last One!	Yes	No	Premiered at 2010 Metro Manila Film Festival
2011		Who's That Girl?	Yes	No	
2011		The Unkabogable Praybeyt Benjamin	Yes	Yes	
2012		Moron 5 and the Crying Lady	Yes	Yes	Co-writer with Mel Mendoza-Del Rosario
2012		This Guy's In Love With U Mare!	Yes	Yes	
2012	Sisterakas		Yes	Yes	Premiered at 2012 Metro Manila Film Festival
2013		Bromance: My Brother's Romance	Yes	No	
2013	Momzillas		Yes	No	
2013	Bekikang: Ang Nanay Kong Beki	Bekikang: My Gay Mom	Yes	No	
2013	Girl, Boy, Bakla, Tomboy	Girl, Boy, Gay, Lesbian	Yes	No	Premiered at 2013 Metro Manila Film Festival
2014	Maria Leonora Teresa		Yes	Yes	
2014		Moron 5.2: The Transformation	Yes	Yes	
2014		The Amazing Praybeyt Benjamin	Yes	Yes	Premiered at 2014 Metro Manila Film Festival
2015	Wang Fam		Yes	No	
2015		Beauty and the Bestie	Yes	No	Premiered at 2015 Metro Manila Film Festival; final directed film
2018		Everybody Loves Baby Wendy	Yes	No	Posthumous release

=== As television director ===
Year	Title	Notes
1997-1999	Mula sa Puso	Also screenplay and story writer
1997-2011	Maalaala Mo Kaya	33 episodes
1999-2001	Saan Ka Man Naroroon	
2001-2003	Sa Dulo ng Walang Hanggan	
2002-2003	Bituin	
2003-2004	Buttercup	
2003-2005	Ang Tanging Ina (TV series)	
2004	Marina	
2005	Kampanerang Kuba	
2006	Komiks	5 episodes
2007	Walang Kapalit	
2007	Sineserye Presents	Season one: Palimos ng Pag-ibig
2007	Love Spell	Episode: "Ellay Enchanted"
2007-2010	Kokey (TV series)	
2008	Volta (TV series)	
2008-2009	Dyosa	
2010	Habang May Buhay	
2010	Kokey at Ako	
2011	Mula sa Puso	Remake of the 1997 series
2012	Wako Wako	
2012-2013	Kahit Puso'y Masugatan	
2013	Galema: Anak ni Zuma	
2013; 2016	Wansapanataym	2 miniseries: "Petrang Paminta" (5 episodes) and "Susi ni Sisay" (9 episodes, final television project)
2015	FlordeLiza	

== Awards ==
Year	Award-giving body	Category	Work	Result
2010	Metro Manila Film Festival	Best Director	Ang Tanging Ina Mo (Last na 'To!)	Won
2013	Metro Manila Film Festival	Best Director	Girl, Boy, Bakla, Tomboy	Nominated
2011	GMMSF Box-Office; Entertainment Awards	Most Popular Film Director	Ang Tanging Ina Mo (Last na 'To!)	Won
2012	GMMSF Box-Office; Entertainment Awards	Most Popular Film Director	The Unkabogable Praybeyt Benjamin	Won
2012	GMMSF Box-Office; Entertainment Awards	Most Popular Screenwriter (with Keiko Aquino)	The Unkabogable Praybeyt Benjamin	Won
2013	GMMSF Box-Office; Entertainment Awards	Most Popular Film Director	Sisterakas	Won
2014	GMMSF Box-Office; Entertainment Awards	Most Popular Film Directors (with Marlon Rivera)	Girl, Boy, Bakla, Tomboy	Won
2016	GMMSF Box-Office; Entertainment Awards	Most Popular Film Directors (with Cathy Garcia-Molina)	Beauty and the Bestie	Won
2016	GMMSF Box-Office; Entertainment Awards	Most Popular Screenwriters (with Carmi Raymundo and Vangie Valdez)	Beauty and the Bestie	Won
