= 31st Gawad Urian Awards =

2008 Philippine film awards ceremony

- Date: October 1, 2008
- Site: Cultural Center of the Philippines, Pasay City

Highlights
- Best Picture: Tirador
- Most awards: Tirador (5)
- Most nominations: Foster Child, Tambolista & Tribu (10)

The 31st Gawad Urian Awards (Filipino: Ika-31 na Gawad Urian) is held on October 1, 2008. It honors the best Philippine films of 2007. The ceremony is held at the Little Theater, Cultural Center of the Philippines in Pasay City. Given the award body's gradual shift towards honoring more independent films, it is only appropriate that the Natatanging Gawad Urian recognition be conferred to Kidlat Tahimik, a pioneer of indie filmmaking. Sid Lucero ties with Jason Abalos for Best Actor. Lucero accepts the award from his father, last year's Best Actor recipient, Mark Gil. Established in 1976, the Gawad Urian Awards highlights the best of Philippine cinema as decided by the Filipino Film Critics.

== Winners and nominees ==
Winners are listed first and bolded.

Best Picture Pinakamahusay na Pelikula	Best Director Pinakamahusay na Direksyon
**Tirador**; Confessional; Endo; Foster Child; Kagadanan sa Banwaan ning Mga Engkanto; Tribu	**Brillante Mendoza** **– Tirador**; Adolfo Alix Jr. – Tambolista; Brillante Mendoza – Foster Child; Jade Castro – Endo; Jerrold Tarog & Ruel Dahis Antipuesto – Confessional; Jim Libiran – Tribu; Lav Diaz – Kagadanan sa Banwaan ning Mga Engkanto; Paolo Villaluna & Ellen Ramos – Selda
Best Actor Pinakamahusay na Pangunahing Aktor	Best Actress Pinakamahusay na Pangunahing Aktres
**Jason Abalos – Endo**; **Sid Lucero – Selda**; Jerrold Tarog – Confessional; Jinggoy Estrada – Katas ng Saudi; Jiro Manio – Tambolista; Roeder Camanag – Kagadanan sa Banwaan ning Mga Engkanto; Romnick Sarmenta – Prinsesa; Shielbert Manuel – Tribu	**Cherry Pie Picache – Foster Child**; Glaiza de Castro – Still Life; Ina Feleo – Endo; Judy Ann Santos – Sakal, Sakali, Saklolo; Lorna Tolentino – Katas ng Saudi
Best Supporting Actor Pinakamahusay na Pangalawang Aktor	Best Supporting Actress Pinakamahusay na Pangalawang Aktres
**Emilio Garcia – Selda**; Alchris Galura – Endo; Benjie Filomeno – Tirador; Coco Martin – Tambolista; Jiro Manio – Foster Child; Publio Briones III – Confessional; Sid Lucero – Tambolista	**Angela Ruiz – Tirador**; Anita Linda – Tambolista; Ara Mina – Selda; Eugene Domingo – Foster Child; Liza Lorena – Katas ng Saudi; Malou Crisologo – Tribu
Best Screenplay Pinakamahusay na Dulang Pampelikula	Best Cinematography Pinakamahusay na Sinematograpiya
**Endo** **– Jade Castro, Michiko Yamamoto & Moira Lang**; Confessional – Jerrold Tarog; Foster Child – Ralston Jover; Kagadanan sa Banwaan ning Mga Engkanto – Lav Diaz; Katas ng Saudi – Jose Javier Reyes; Tambolista – Ave Regina S. Tayag; Tirador – Ralston Jover; Tribu – Jim Libiran	**Tirador – Jeffrey Dela Cruz, Gary Tria, Brillante Mendoza & Julius Palomo Villanueva**; Foster Child – Odyssey Flores; Kadin – Rodolfo Aves Jr.; Maling Akala – Larry Manda; Selda – Odyssey Flores; Still Life – Dan Villegas; Tambolista – Albert Banzon; Tribu – Albert Banzon
Best Production Design Pinakamahusay na Disenyong Pamproduksyon	Best Editing Pinakamahusay na Editing
**Kagadanan sa Banwaan ning Mga Engkanto – Lav Diaz & Dante Perez**; Endo – Jeck Cogama; Foster Child – Benjamin Padero; Maling Akala – Baba Velasco & Vilma B. Velasco; Pisay – Martin Masadao, Dante Nico Garcia, Regie Regalado & Endi Balbuena; Selda – Danny Red; Tirador – Harley Alcasid & Deans Habal; Tribu – Armi Rae Cacanindin	**Tambolista** **– Aleks Castañeda**; Confessional – Jerrold Tarog; Foster Child – Charliebebs Gohetia; Tribu – Lawrence Ang; When Timawa Meets Delgado – Ray Gibraltar
Best Music Pinakamahusay na Musika	Best Sound Pinakamahusay na Tunog
**Tribu** – **Francis de Veyra**; Maling Akala – Dan Gil; Pisay – Vincent de Jesus; Tambolista – Khavn; Tirador – Teresa Barrozo	**Tirador** **– Ditoy Aguila & Junel Valencia**; Confessional – Jerrold Tarog; Foster Child – Emmanuel Clemente & Arnold Reodica; Tambolista – Ditoy Aguila; Tribu – Mark Laccay
Best Short Film Pinakamahusay na Musika
**Rolyo**; Bingit; Manikarya; Maria Maria; My Pet; Tutos

== Special Award ==
=== Natatanging Gawad Urian ===
- Kidlat Tahimik
