= List of awards and nominations received by Cherry Pie Picache =

Picache at the Sine Sandaan in 2019

Cherry Pie Picache is a Filipino screen and stage actress. In her three decade long career, she has been recognized with numerous awards and nominations from international and local award-giving bodies for her work in film, television and stage. Regarded as one of her generation's most awarded actresses, Picache has won two Durban International Film Festival Awards, an Osian's Cinefan Festival of Asian and Arab Cinema Awards, two Asian Television Awards, three Gawad Urian Awards, two Metro Manila Film Festival Awards, and a Luna Award.

Picache has received international acclaim and recognition for her acting performances in film and television. In 1998, her role in GMA Telesine's "Melinda" earned Picache her first Asian Television Award for Best Supporting Drama Actress. Her portrayal in a Maalaala Mo Kaya's "Aklat" episode earned Picache her second Asian Television Award trophy for Best Drama Actress. She won Best Actress for two consecutive years at the Durban International Film Festival in South Africa for her leading roles in Kaleldo (2007) and Foster Child (2008). Also in 2007, Picache received another Best Actress win at the Osian's Cinefan Festival of Asian and Arab Cinema in India for her portrayal in Brilliante Mendoza's Foster Child. In 2017, she received a Best Supporting Actress nomination at the ASEAN International Film Festival and Awards for her role in Pauwi Na (2016).

== Awards and nominations ==
Awards and nominations received by Cherry Pie Picache
Award (Note: Awards, festivals, honors and other miscellaneous organizations are listed in alphabetical order.)	Year (Note: Indicates the year of ceremony. Each year is linked to the article about the awards held that year, wherever possible.)	Category	Nominated work	Result	Ref.
ASEAN International Film Festival and Awards	2017	Best Supporting Actress	Pauwi Na	Nominated	
Asian Television Awards	1998	Best Supporting Drama Actress	GMA Telesine ("Melinda")	Won	
Asian Television Awards	1999	Best Drama Actress	Maalaala Mo Kaya ("Aklat")	Won	
Cinema One Originals Digital Film Festival	2018	Best Supporting Actress	Pang MMK	Nominated	
Durban International Film Festival	2007	Best Actress	Kaleldo	Won	
Durban International Film Festival	2008	Best Actress	Foster Child	Won	
EdukCircle Awards	2018	Best Supporting Actress	The Blood Sisters	Won	
FAMAS Awards	2003	Best Supporting Actress	American Adobo	Nominated	
FAMAS Awards	2006	Best Supporting Actress	Ako Legal Wife	Nominated	
FAMAS Awards	2007	Best Actress	Kaleldo	Nominated	
Festival International du Film d'Environnement	2007	Prix de la Fiction	Foster Child	Won	
Gawad Buhay Awards	2023	Female Lead Performance in a Play	Under My Skin	Nominated	
Gawad Tanglaw Awards	2008	Best Actress	Foster Child	Won	
Gawad Tanglaw Awards	2010	Best Ensemble Performance in a Television Drama	Tayong Dalawa	Won	
Gawad Tanglaw Awards	2012	Most Commended Actor of the Decade	Herself	Won	
Gawad Urian Awards	1994	Best Supporting Actress	Makati Ave. (Office Girls)	Nominated	
Gawad Urian Awards	1997	Best Supporting Actress	Abot Kamay ang Pangarap	Nominated	
Gawad Urian Awards	2000	Best Supporting Actress	Burlesk King	Nominated	
Gawad Urian Awards	2003	Best Actress	American Adobo	Nominated	
Gawad Urian Awards	2004	Best Actress	Bridal Shower	Won	
Gawad Urian Awards	2007	Best Actress	Kaleldo	Nominated	
Gawad Urian Awards	2008	Best Actress	Foster Child	Won	
Gawad Urian Awards	2011	Best Actress of the Decade	Herself	Won	
Gawad Urian Awards	2012	Best Actress	Isda	Nominated	
Gawad Urian Awards	2017	Best Actress	Pauwi Na	Nominated	
GEMS Hiyas ng Sining	2017	Best Supporting Actress	Whistleblower	Won	
GEMS Hiyas ng Sining	2018	Best Actress	Buwan at Baril sa Eb Major	Won	
Golden Screen Awards	2004	Best Performance by an Actress in a Lead Role - Musical or Comedy	Bridal Shower	Won	
Golden Screen Awards	2006	Best Performance by an Actress in a Supporting Role (Drama, Musical or Comedy)	Ako Legal Wife	Nominated	
Golden Screen Awards	2006	Best Performance by an Actress in a Leading Role (Musical or Comedy)	Bikini Open	Nominated	
Golden Screen Awards	2007	Best Performance by an Actress in a Leading Role (Musical or Comedy)	Manay Po	Nominated	
Golden Screen Awards	2007	Best Performance by an Actress in a Leading Role (Drama)	Kaleldo	Nominated	
Golden Screen Awards	2007	Best Performance by an Actress in a Supporting Role (Drama, Musical or Comedy)	Twilight Dancers	Won	
Golden Screen Awards	2008	Best Performance by an Actress in a Lead Role (Drama)	Foster Child	Won	
Golden Screen Awards	2009	Best Performance by an Actress in a Supporting Role (Drama, Musical or Comedy)	Boses	Nominated	
Golden Screen Awards	2011	Best Performance by an Actress in a Supporting Role (Drama, Musical or Comedy)	Noy	Nominated	
Golden Screen Awards	2013	Dekada Award	Herself	Won	
Golden Screen TV Awards	2005	Best Actress in a Drama Special	Maalaala Mo Kaya ("Bestida")	Won	
Golden Screen TV Awards	2014	Outstanding Supporting Actress in a Drama Series	Ina, Kapatid, Anak	Nominated	
Indie Bravo! Awards	2012	Honoree for International Recognition	Herself	Won	
Luna Awards	2001	Best Supporting Actress	Anak	Nominated	
Luna Awards	2003	Best Supporting Actress	American Adobo	Won	
Luna Awards	2007	Best Supporting Actress	I Wanna Be Happy	Nominated	
Luna Awards	2011	Best Supporting Actress	Noy	Nominated	
Luna Awards	2017	Best Actress	Pauwi Na	Nominated	
Manila International Film Festival	2024	Best Supporting Actress	Firefly	Nominated	
Metro Manila Film Festival	2002	Best Supporting Actress	American Adobo	Won	
Metro Manila Film Festival	2005	Best Supporting Actress	Ako Legal Wife	Won	
Osian's Cinefan Festival of Asian and Arab Cinema	2007	Best Actress	Foster Child	Won	
PMPC Star Awards for Movies	1990	Most Promising Female Newcomer	Kolegiala	Nominated	
PMPC Star Awards for Movies	2006	Movie Supporting Actress of the Year	Ako Legal Wife	Nominated	
PMPC Star Awards for Movies	2006	Movie Actress of the Year	Bikini Open	Nominated	
PMPC Star Awards for Movies	2007	Movie Actress of the Year	Kaleldo	Nominated	
PMPC Star Awards for Movies	2007	Movie Supporting Actress of the Year	Twilight Dancers	Nominated	
PMPC Star Awards for Movies	2008	Movie Actress of the Year	Foster Child	Nominated	
PMPC Star Awards for Movies	2017	Movie Supporting Actress of the Year	Whistleblower	Nominated	
PEP List Awards	2016	Teleserye Supporting Actress of the Year	On the Wings of Love	Won	
PMPC Star Awards for Television	2003	Best Single Performance by an Actress	Tanging Yaman, The Series: Sa Kandungan Mo Inay	Won	
PMPC Star Awards for Television	2007	Best Single Performance by an Actress	Maalaala Mo Kaya ("Korte")	Nominated	
PMPC Star Awards for Television	2008	Best Single Performance by an Actress	Maalaala Mo Kaya ("Tren")	Nominated	
PMPC Star Awards for Television	2009	Best Drama Actress	Iisa Pa Lamang	Nominated	
PMPC Star Awards for Television	2010	Best Drama Actress	Florinda	Nominated	
PMPC Star Awards for Television	2014	Best Drama Supporting Actress	Ikaw Lamang	Nominated	
PMPC Star Awards for Television	2021	Best Drama Supporting Actress	Sandugo	Nominated	
PMPC Star Awards for Television	2025	Best Drama Supporting Actress	Batang Quiapo	Won	
PMPC Star Awards for Television	2025	Best Drama Supporting Actress	Batang Quiapo	Nominated	
Tofarm Film Festival	2016	Best Actress	Pauwi Na	Won	
Young Critics Circle	2001	Best Performance by Male or Female, Adult or Child, Individual or Ensemble in Leading or Supporting Role	Tanging Yaman	Won	
Young Critics Circle	2007	Best Performance by Male or Female, Adult or Child, Individual or Ensemble in Leading or Supporting Role	Kaleldo	Nominated	
Young Critics Circle	2008	Best Performance by Male or Female, Adult or Child, Individual or Ensemble in Leading or Supporting Role	Foster Child	Nominated	
