= Kwentong Jollibee =

Philippine web series

- Agency: McCann Philippines
- Client: Jollibee Group
- Market: Philippines
- Language: Filipino
- Media: Web series
- Running time: 5 minutes (average)
- Product: Jollibee
- Release date: February 19, 2016 – May 11, 2024

Kwentong Jollibee (English: Jollibee Stories) is a series of short films released to promote Jollibee.

Created by advertising agency, McCann Philippines for Jollibee, the videos were released on Facebook and the Jollibee Studios YouTube channel. The first episodes were released on February 14, 2016, with the last episode released in May 2024.

== Background ==
Kwentong Jollibee is a series of short films produced to promote the flagship brand of Jollibee Foods Corporation (JFC), the fast food chain Jollibee. It was produced by ad agency McCann Philippines as part of Jollibee's digital advertising campaign.

The videos are presented as being "inspired by a true story" and center around mundane Filipino life situations. They also do not focus on explicitly promoting a product like typical television commercials. Videos are released sporadically, typically during special occasions such as Valentine's Day, Mother's Day, Mother's Day, Father's Day, Grandparents' Day, and Christmas.

== Release ==
Videos are made available in Facebook and Jollibee Studios, Jollibee's YouTube Channel. This platform also hosts the Petsa de Peligro (2017) and One True Pair (2018).

The Kwentong Jollibee videos are longer than conventional television commercials (TVCs) having an average length of five minutes. Francis Flores, the Chief Marketing Officer for JFC's Global Office noted that YouTube allows for "more liberty to tell the story in full" in comparison to traditional media.

The first four episodes of Kwentong Jollibee was released on February 19, 2016.

== Reception ==
Some episodes of Kwentong Jollibee was reportedly among the top ten most viewed videos in the Philippines on YouTube. The September 2017 episode "Kahera" reportedly ranked eight in April 2017. "Crush" was the seventh most viewed video from January to June 2017. It was attributed to the quadruple increase of Jollibee's Yum hamburger sales as of July 2017.

"Crush" was included in Branding Asia's World's Top 50 Ads List of 2017 with Jollibee only the Philippine brand on the roster.

Jollibee received various awards for the Kwentong Jollibee at the 2018 Public Relations Society of the Philippines and the 2018 APAC Effie Awards in Singapore.

== Accolades ==
Year	Awards	Category	Recipient	Result	Ref.
2018	APAC Effie Awards	Asia Pacific Brands	"Valentine's Joy for the Heartbroken" series	Gold	
2018	APAC Effie Awards	Social Media Marketing	"Valentine's Joy for the Heartbroken" series	Gold	
2018	APAC Effie Awards	Restaurants	"Valentine's Joy for the Heartbroken" series	Silver	
2018	APAC Effie Awards	Seasonal Marketing	"Valentine's Joy for the Heartbroken" series	Bronze	
2018	APAC Effie Awards	Small Budget – Products	"Valentine's Joy for the Heartbroken" series	Bronze	
2018	Anvil Awards	—	Kwentong Jollibee	Platinum	
2018	Anvil Awards	—	Kwentong Jollibee	Gold	
2018	Kidlat Awards	—	"Vow"	Silver	
2018	Creative Guild of the Association of Accredited Advertising Agencies	—	Jollibee Valentine's Day Series	Bronze	
2025	Anvil Awards	PR Programs – Best Use of Social Media	"Share the Joy of Love: Valentine’s Day 2024" series	Silver	
2025	Anvil Awards	PR Programs – Best Use of Social Media	"Nanay ng Bayan"	Silver	

== Episodes list ==
No.	Title	Directed by	Original release date
1	"Kwentong Jollibee (Jollibee Stories)"	Ianco Dela Cruz	February 19, 2016
2	"Jabee"	Ianco Dela Cruz	February 19, 2016
3	"Tagpuan (Meeting Place)"	Ianco Dela Cruz	February 19, 2016
4	"Almusal (Breakfast)"	Ianco Dela Cruz	February 19, 2016
5	"Mama's Girl"	Unknown	May 16, 2016
6	"Entrance Exam"	Unknown	June 18, 2016
7	"Kahera" (lit. 'Cashier')	Ianco Dela Cruz	September 6, 2016
8	"Regalo" (lit. 'Gift')	Unknown	December 9, 2016
9	"Vow"	Ianco Dela Cruz	February 9, 2017
10	"Date"	Unknown	February 10, 2017
11	"Parangal (Tribute)"	Unknown	May 9, 2017
12	"Powers"	Unknown	June 10, 2017
13	"Apo (Grandchild)"	Ianco Dela Cruz	September 3, 2017
14	"Homecoming"	Joel Ruiz	February 1, 2018
15	"Status"	Ianco Dela Cruz	February 2, 2018
16	"Amor" lit. 'Love'	Unknown	May 2, 2018
17	"Tess"	Unknown	May 5, 2018
18	"Biyahe (Journey)"	Unknown	September 5, 2018
19	"Best Friend"	Unknown	December 9, 2018
20	"Pamasko" (lit. 'Christmas gift')	Unknown	December 15, 2018
21	"Proposal"	Joel Ruiz	February 4, 2019
22	"Schoolboy"	Unknown	May 3, 2019
23	"First Love"	Unknown	June 8, 2019
24	"Garapon (Jar)"	Unknown	September 3, 2019
25	"#CoupleGoals"	Unknown	February 1, 2020
26	"Space"	Unknown	February 3, 2020
27	"Apart"	Unknown	February 7, 2020
28	"Pasasalamat" (lit. 'Tribute')	Unknown	May 9, 2020
29	"Salamat po Tay!" (lit. 'Thank you dad!')	Unknown	June 20, 2020
30	"LDR"	Antoinette Jadaone	February 4, 2021
31	"First Date"	Pepe Diokno	February 8, 2021
32	"Hero"	Ianco Dela Cruz	February 12, 2021
33	"Pangako (Promise)"	Unknown	May 5, 2021
34	"Maestro"	Unknown	June 16, 2021
35	"600 DAYS"	Unknown	February 10, 2022
36	"Dream Guy"	Unknown	February 14, 2022
37	"ILY"	Unknown	February 19, 2022
38	"Hinga (Breathe)"	Unknown	May 5, 2022
39	"Portraits"	Unknown	June 18, 2022
40	"From Crewmates to Soulmates"	Unknown	February 11, 2023
41	"Second Chance at First Love"	Unknown	February 13, 2023
42	"Louder Than Words"	Unknown	May 12, 2023
43	"30 Dates"	Paolo Villaluna	February 13, 2024
44	"To Love Again"	Paolo Villaluna	February 14, 2024
45	"Nanay ng Bayan"	Unknown	May 11, 2024
