= Madam Auring =

Filipina fortune teller(1940–2020)

- Born: Aurea Elfero; March 11, 1940; Sampaloc, Manila, Philippines
- Died: October 30, 2020 (aged 80); Philippines
- Occupations: Actress, astrological consultant

Aurea Erfelo, known professionally as Madam Auring (11 March 1940 – 30 October 2020), was a Filipina fortune teller and actress. According to her own account, she was one of "the five most famous women in Asia in the 1990s".

== Early life ==
The daughter of Luciana Damian and Jaime Erfelo, Aurea Erfelo grew up in a poor family and was not educated beyond elementary school.

== Career ==
Auring shot to fame when she correctly predicted Amparo Muñoz winning the 1974 Miss Universe title. Due to this event, she gained popularity, causing the boxer Muhammad Ali, who was in Manila at that time due to the "Thrilla in Manila" boxing event, to seek her advice. The American fortune teller Phyllis Bury had predicted Ali would lose against Joe Frazier but Auring correctly predicted his win. As a result, Ali gave her the nickname "Madam Auring".

Following this success, well-known personalities such as First Lady Imelda Marcos, Nora Aunor, Fernando Poe Jr., President Joseph Estrada, Rolando Navarette, and Hollywood actors Robert Duvall and Franco Nero sought her advice. She fell in love with Larry Holmes, with whom she had a relationship before he was married to his girlfriend in the United States.

Her other notable predictions included that of President Fidel V. Ramos' win over rival Miriam Defensor Santiago, the death of starlet Claudia Zobel; the full and unimpeached term of former president and former House Speaker Gloria Macapagal Arroyo, and the break-up of Shalani Soledad and former President Benigno Aquino III in 2010.

Besides being a fortune teller, Auring also worked as an actress, including a role where she starred together with the disqualified presidential candidate Eddie Gil.

== Personal life ==
When she was 23, her father forced her to marry a young architect who took her to his home after a party. She originally loved a carpenter named Jhon Paulo Garcia but their relationship did not last that long since she married . The couple had four children before their marriage ended. Madam Auring bore two more children as a result of later relationships.

== Death ==
She died on 30 October 2020, at the age of 80.

== Filmography ==
| Year | Title | Role |
|---|---|---|
| 1987 | Family Tree | |
| 1992 | Kahit Minsan | |
| 1999 | Hinahanap-hanap kita | |
| 2000 | Masarap habang mainit | |
| 2001 | Oh Eumir Nur, Kantutin Mo Ako | |
| 2004 | I Will Survive | |
| 2005 | Pelukang itim: Agimat ko ito for victory again | |
| 2005 | Bikini Open | |
| 2006 | Reyna: Ang makulay na pakikipagsapalaran ng mga achucherva, achuchuva, achechenes... | |
| 2007 | Love Spell | |
| 2007 | Apat dapat, dapat apat: Friends 4 lyf and death | |
| 2008 | Manay Po 2: Overload | Applicant |
| 2008 | Iskul Bukol 20 Years After: The Ungasis and Escaleras Adventure | |
| 2011 | Tunay na Buhay | |
