= Kevin Foxe =

American film producer

Kevin J. Foxe is a director, producer, writer, and storyteller, most known for the successful independent film The Blair Witch Project. Foxe was born in Enfield, CT. He worked in editing and post production, production managing, assistant directing, location managing, producing and writing with filmmakers such as Federico Fellini, Miloš Forman, David Mamet, Bob Fosse, and Robert Benton. He was a member of the original board of the New Media Council for the Producers Guild of America.

In 1982 Foxe moved to New York City and worked in film, video, and theater, starting as an assistant in the film program at New York University. He later worked at Liberty Studios, Filmhaus, Sound One, Todd-AO, DuArt, and The Tape House.

In 2017, Foxe filmed and produced a 48-minute sustainability documentary called the Bicycle Revolution to encourage urban planning to be less vehicle-centric.

== Filmography ==
- The Ghost Experiment (3D film) (2012) (director, writer, producer)
- Life At Large (2012) (webseries) (actor, co-producer)
- Jackson Horn (2011) (TV) (director, executive producer)
- Orphans of Apollo (2008) (documentary) (co-producer)
- Open 24 Hours (short) (2010-2011) (executive producer)
- Beat The Street (2007) (executive producer)
- Movies That Shook The World (2005) (TV documentary) (actor; himself)
- How to Draw a Bunny (2002) (associate producer)
- American Adobo (2001) (executive producer)
- In The Eye Of The Storm (2001) (producer)
- Miracle Boy and Nyquist (2001) (executive producer)
- Book of Shadows: Blair Witch 2 (2000) (associate producer)
- The Blair Witch Project (1999) (executive producer)
- Nowhere to Go (1998) (producer)
- "Ancestors" (1997) (mini) TV Series (producer)
- Eliza and I (1997) (assistant director)
- Rivalen des Glücks - The Contenders (1993) (producer)
- "The Stand" (1994) (mini) TV Series (location manager)
- Homicide (1991) (location manager)
- Valmont (1989) (post-production supervisor)
- Lip Service (1988) (TV) (assistant editor)
- Impure Thoughts (1986) (as Kevin Foxe) .... St. Jude Student

In April 2012, Foxe declared Chapter 7 bankruptcy in the state of California.
