= Manay Po 2: Overload =

- Directed by: Joel C. Lamangan
- Screenplay by: Dinno Erece
- Story by: Lily Y. Monteverde; Dinno Erece
- Based on: Manay Po film by Joel C. Lamangan
- Produced by: Lily Y. Monteverde
- Starring: Rufa Mae Quinto; Cherry Pie Picache; Polo Ravales; John Prats; Jiro Manio; Sid Lucero
- Cinematography: Luis Quirino
- Music by: Jesse Lucas
- Production company: Regal Films
- Distributed by: Regal Entertainment
- Release date: April 16, 2008 (Philippines)
- Running time: 105 minutes
- Language: Filipino

Manay Po 2: Overload is a 2008 film written by Dinno Erece and directed by Joel C. Lamangan and starring Rufa Mae Quinto, Cherry Pie Picache, and Polo Ravales in the sequel to Manay Po which was filmed under the working title Manay po 2: 3 Gays and a Baby.

== Plot ==
Manay Po 2 continues the Manay Po story about a mother with 3 sons, 2 of whom are openly gay. The eldest son Oscar (Polo Ravales) is married to his business partner/boyfriend and the two are trying to have a son via artificial insemination and use of a surrogate mother. The woman named Bette (Rufa Mae Quinto) needs money and is willing to do anything for it, even being pregnant as a surrogate. Orwell (Jiro Manio), in his teens, is still confused about his sexuality and has a crush in school on his class's swimming instructor but cannot say it. Orson (John Prats), the only openly gay of the siblings, has become the campus queen, which angers Marky's girlfriend (EJ Jallorina). Problems arise between Oscar and his boyfriend when Bette demands more time with her. Bette dirty secret is that she has a live-in partner, who is revealed to be the one who stole the jewelry in the preceding film. The man steals the baby from Bette and tries to ransom it, but a timely intervention from Orson's family and friends rescues the infant, revealed to be dark complected in contrast to the tone of the mother's paler flesh. Bette reveals that she was using a skin-whitening product and bids farewell to the family.

== Cast ==
- Cherry Pie Picache as Luzvimida "Luz" Catacutan
- Polo Ravales as Oscar "Cherie Gil" Dimagiba
- John Prats as Orson "Ursula" Castello
- Jiro Manio as Orwell "Wella" Castello
- Sid Lucero as Adrian "Adriana" Pengson
- Rufa Mae Quinto as Bette
- Christian Vasquez as Gerry
- Marco Alcaraz as Moxie
- Giselle Sanchez as Maritess
- Rubi Rubi as Summer Rain
- IC Mendoza as Frida
- EJ Jallorina as Daphne
- Alex Castro as Rainier
- Mike Tan as Marky
- Andrea Torres as Ida
- Madam Auring as Applicant
- Charles Christianson as Cher
- Paolo Rivero as Mr. Padilla
- Jim Pebanco as Rouel
- Anthony Roquel as Principal
