= IC Mendoza =

Filipino actor, model, and television personality

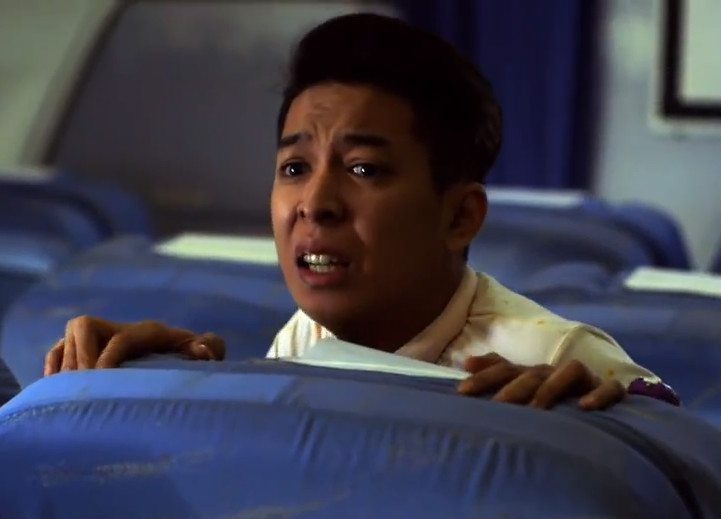
- Mendoza in Shake, Rattle & Roll XV
- Born: Isaiah Culleen Carvajal Mendoza; January 14, 1988 (age 38); Makati, Philippines
- Occupations: Actor, TV host, model
- Years active: 1991–present
- Parents: Ed Mendoza (father); Dolly Anne Carvajal (mother)
- Relatives: Inday Badiday (grandmother)

Isaiah Culleen Carvajal Mendoza (born January 14, 1988), better known as IC Mendoza, is a Filipino actor, model, and television personality.

== Early life ==
Isaiah Culleen Carvajal Mendoza was born on January 14, 1988, in Makati Medical Center, Makati, Philippines. He is the grandson of the late television personality and "Queen of Intrigues" and the mother of Philippine Talk Shows Inday Badiday (Lourdes Carvajal) and son of entertainment columnist Dolly Anne Carvajal. His father Ed Mendoza was a former PBA basketball player who is now a pastor in New York. He came out as gay on The Buzz in 2005.

== Filmography ==
=== Film ===
Year	Title	Role
1991	Ang Utol Kong Hoodlum	Ben's family
1991	Darna	
1991	Pretty Boy	
1991	Miss Na Miss Kita (Ang Utol Kong Hoodlum II)	Ben's family
1992	Pido Dida 3: May Kambal Na!	Dong
1992	Shake, Rattle & Roll IV	Teks (segment "Ang Madre")
1993	Dugo ng Panday	
1993	Astig	
2006	Manay Po	Frida
2006	Twilight Dancers	Hazel
2006	Reyna: Ang Makulay na Pakikipagsapalaran ng Mga Achucherva, Achuchuva, Achechenes...	IC
2006	Shake, Rattle & Roll 8	Ojie (segment "LRT")
2007	My Kuya's Wedding	Vi
2008	Manay Po 2: Overload	Frida
2008	Shake, Rattle & Roll X	Pinky (segment "Class Picture")
2009	Fidel	Boy George
2010	Paano Na Kaya?	Juding
2010	In Your Eyes	Ciara's friend
2010	HIV: Si Heidi, Si Ivy at Si V	Vanessa
2012	This Guy's In Love With U Mare!	Babushka
2012	A Secret Affair	Miggy Bernal
2013	Raketeros	Krisey
2014	Shake, Rattle & Roll XV	Adam (segment "Flight 666")
2016	Die Beautiful	Paola

=== Television ===
Year	Title
2005	Maynila
2006	Maalaala Mo Kaya
2007	Your Song
2008–2012	Juicy!
2008–2013	Talentadong Pinoy
2008–2010	Moomoo & Me
2009	Darna
2010–2011	P.O.5
2011–2012	Hey It's Saberdey!
2011	Ang Utol Kong Hoodlum
2013–2015	Celebrity Talk
2015	Showbiz Konek na Konek
2018	Ngayon at Kailanman
