= List of Sandugo episodes =

Sandugo is a 2019 Philippine drama television series starring Ejay Falcon, and Aljur Abrenica. The series premiered on ABS-CBN's Kapamilya Gold afternoon block and worldwide via The Filipino Channel from September 30, 2019 to March 20, 2020, replacing Precious Hearts Romances Presents: Los Bastardos.

== Series overview ==
Season	Episodes	Originally released	
Season	Episodes	First released	Last released
1	125	September 30, 2019	March 20, 2020

== Episodes ==
=== Season 1 ===
No. overall	No. in season	Title	Original release date	Kantar Media Ratings (nationwide)
1	1	"Pagsubok"	September 30, 2019	18.0%
2	2	"Benta"	October 1, 2019	17.1%
3	3	"Palaboy"	October 2, 2019	15.7%
4	4	"Landas"	October 3, 2019	17.0%
5	5	"Pamilya"	October 4, 2019	16.1%
6	6	"Harapan"	October 7, 2019	15.4%
7	7	"Imbestiga"	October 8, 2019	14.9%
8	8	"Kaarawan"	October 9, 2019	15.9%
9	9	"Bantay"	October 10, 2019	16.8%
10	10	"Bisita"	October 11, 2019	14.9%
11	11	"Simba"	October 14, 2019	16.7%
12	12	"Ligtas"	October 15, 2019	15.6%
13	13	"Kasundo"	October 16, 2019	14.8%
14	14	"Pabuya"	October 17, 2019	15.9%
15	15	"Diskarte"	October 18, 2019	14.6%
16	16	"Ungkat"	October 21, 2019	15.7%
17	17	"Alaala"	October 22, 2019	15.8%
18	18	"Unang Tagpo"	October 23, 2019	15.8%
19	19	"Tensyon"	October 24, 2019	15.4%
20	20	"Pagtingin"	October 25, 2019	16.4%
21	21	"Kakampi"	October 28, 2019	15.0%
22	22	"Balak"	October 29, 2019	15.4%
23	23	"Tuklas"	October 30, 2019	16.3%
24	24	"Sugod"	October 31, 2019	15.7%
25	25	"Pag-amin"	November 1, 2019	13.1%
26	26	"Salarin"	November 4, 2019	16.1%
27	27	"Kabayaran"	November 5, 2019	15.0%
28	28	"Tiwala"	November 6, 2019	16.0%
29	29	"Higanti"	November 7, 2019	15.9%
30	30	"Atake"	November 8, 2019	16.6%
31	31	"Alok"	November 11, 2019	15.8%
32	32	"Dampot"	November 12, 2019	15.9%
33	33	"Karamay"	November 13, 2019	15.4%
34	34	"Espesyal"	November 14, 2019	17.4%
35	35	"Pasado"	November 15, 2019	16.0%
36	36	"Kasunduan"	November 18, 2019	15.7%
37	37	"Sugal"	November 19, 2019	14.9%
38	38	"Buhay"	November 20, 2019	16.2%
39	39	"Resulta"	November 21, 2019	15.3%
40	40	"Pagbabalik"	November 22, 2019	13.7%
41	41	"Pangamba"	November 25, 2019	16.3%
42	42	"Bilib"	November 26, 2019	14.6%
43	43	"Pabida"	November 27, 2019	13.7%
44	44	"Amo"	November 28, 2019	13.5%
45	45	"Halungkat"	November 29, 2019	13.7%
46	46	"Selos"	December 2, 2019	12.9%
47	47	"Konektado"	December 3, 2019	12.9%
48	48	"Katotohanan"	December 4, 2019	12.4%
49	49	"Pagtanggap"	December 5, 2019	12.0%
50	50	"Sikreto"	December 6, 2019	11.4%
51	51	"Bistado"	December 9, 2019	12.5%
52	52	"Lusot"	December 10, 2019	12.3%
53	53	"Paborito"	December 11, 2019	13.1%
54	54	"Kumpirmado"	December 12, 2019	13.5%
55	55	"Pangungulila"	December 13, 2019	13.4%
56	56	"Anak"	December 16, 2019	14.2%
57	57	"Palaban"	December 17, 2019	11.9%
58	58	"Hinanakit"	December 18, 2019	13.1%
59	59	"Patawad"	December 19, 2019	12.6%
60	60	"Ambush"	December 20, 2019	11.4%
61	61	"Alaga"	December 23, 2019	11.3%
62	62	"Pinuno"	December 24, 2019	10.6%
63	63	"Pabuya"	December 25, 2019	9.7%
64	64	"Sulsol"	December 26, 2019	12.7%
65	65	"Banta"	December 27, 2019	10.8%
66	66	"Trahedya"	December 30, 2019	10.4%
67	67	"Utos"	December 31, 2019	10.2%
68	68	"Huli"	January 1, 2020	10.5%
69	69	"Laya"	January 2, 2020	12.7%
70	70	"Sundan"	January 3, 2020	13.0%
71	71	"Planado"	January 6, 2020	13.3%
72	72	"Raid"	January 7, 2020	13.0%
73	73	"Bulag"	January 8, 2020	13.0%
74	74	"Lungga"	January 9, 2020	14.3%
75	75	"Arestado"	January 10, 2020	11.4%
76	76	"Pagkatao"	January 13, 2020	13.3%
77	77	"Duda"	January 14, 2020	12.4%
78	78	"Pagtatapat"	January 15, 2020	12.3%
79	79	"Nakaraan"	January 16, 2020	11.6%
80	80	"Sangkot"	January 17, 2020	12.7%
81	81	"Pursigido"	January 20, 2020	11.4%
82	82	"Sumbong"	January 21, 2020	11.5%
83	83	"Hamon"	January 22, 2020	11.0%
84	84	"Eskandalo"	January 23, 2020	12.2%
85	85	"Balikan"	January 24, 2020	12.9%
86	86	"Atraso"	January 27, 2020	13.4%
87	87	"Impormasyon"	January 28, 2020	12.0%
88	88	"Dispatsa"	January 29, 2020	12.9%
89	89	"Wanted"	January 30, 2020	12.5%
90	90	"Protektado"	January 31, 2020	12.6%
91	91	"Tauhan"	February 3, 2020	12.2%
92	92	"Patibong"	February 4, 2020	13.0%
93	93	"Prinsipyo"	February 5, 2020	14.7%
94	94	"Layas"	February 6, 2020	15.3%
95	95	"Aksidente"	February 7, 2020	15.2%
96	96	"Ganti"	February 10, 2020	11.2%
97	97	"Pasakit"	February 11, 2020	10.5%
98	98	"Recruit"	February 12, 2020	10.6%
99	99	"Pabor"	February 13, 2020	10.6%
100	100	"Dinadala"	February 14, 2020	10.6%
101	101	"Sabong"	February 17, 2020	11.8%
102	102	"Rescue"	February 18, 2020	10.7%
103	103	"Pagsalakay"	February 19, 2020	10.0%
104	104	"Takas"	February 20, 2020	11.3%
105	105	"Bunyag"	February 21, 2020	10.9%
106	106	"Pagtugis"	February 24, 2020	12.7%
107	107	"Kondisyon"	February 25, 2020	11.7%
108	108	"Patunay"	February 26, 2020	10.7%
109	109	"Paglaya"	February 27, 2020	10.7%
110	110	"Paglinlang"	February 28, 2020	11.0%
111	111	"Pagtataka"	March 2, 2020	11.8%
112	112	"Negosyo"	March 3, 2020	11.4%
113	113	"Sangkot"	March 4, 2020	11.3%
114	114	"Kalakaran"	March 5, 2020	11.4%
115	115	"Pagtanggol"	March 6, 2020	10.9%
116	116	"Malaya"	March 9, 2020	11.2%
117	117	"Balik Loob"	March 10, 2020	11.7%
118	118	"Kumpleto"	March 11, 2020	11.8%
119	119	"Tatang"	March 12, 2020	12.2%
120	120	"Pagluluksa"	March 13, 2020	13.1%
121	121	"Desisyon"	March 16, 2020	N/A
122	122	"Tunay na Ama"	March 17, 2020	N/A
123	123	"Kapatawaran"	March 18, 2020	N/A
124	124	"Kapalit na Buhay"	March 19, 2020	N/A
125	125	"Laban ng Pamilya"	March 20, 2020	N/A
