= Pinoy Pawnstars Gallery =

- Location: Quezon City, Metro Manila, Philippines
- Coordinates: 14°38′00.9″N 121°03′18.2″E
- Collection size: ~500
- Owner: Boss Toyo

The Pinoy Pawnstars Gallery is a museum in Quezon City, Metro Manila, Philippines. It features items collected by Boss Toyo from various public figures in Philippine showbiz.

== History ==
The Pinoy Pawnstars Gallery was by Jayson Luzadas, commonly known as Boss Toyo. The museum is named after Boss Toyo's YouTube series Pinoy Pawnstars which features memorabilia sold to him by celebrities. The plan was to have these artifacts displayed to the public.

On June 8, 2024, the groundbreaking for the Pinoy Pawnstars Gallery was held. The museum was officially launched on July 5, 2025 with plans to open it to the public the next week.

== Collection ==
Pinoy Pawnstars Gallery has around 500 items which was sourced from various Filipino celebrities including Billy Crawford, Fernando Poe Jr., and Nora Aunor. The items in display are not for sale.
