= Tirador =

- Directed by: Brillante Mendoza
- Written by: Joel Ralston Jover
- Produced by: Ferdinand Lapuz
- Starring: Jiro Manio; Coco Martin; Kristoffer King
- Cinematography: Jeffrey dela Cruz; Brillante Mendoza; Gary Tria; Julius Palomo Villanueva
- Edited by: Charliebebs Gohetia
- Music by: Tere Barrozo
- Production companies: Center Stage Productions; Rollingball Entertainment; Ignite Media
- Distributed by: GMA Films
- Release dates: September 7, 2007 (Toronto International Film Festival); July 2, 2008 (Philippines)
- Running time: 126 minutes
- Country: Philippines
- Language: Filipino

Tirador (transl. Slingshot) is a 2007 film directed by Brillante Mendoza. Produced by the Centerstage Productions, the film shows the political undertones of the Filipinos who are living in poverty.

== Plot ==
The film revolves around the lives of Rex, Caloy, Leo and Odie on the streets of Quiapo, one of the most crowded, depressed and notorious areas in Manila. The movie was set during Holy Week and the 2007 elections that showed both the political and religious stands of a typical Filipino in the slums.

The low-life criminals are portrayed in a way that humanizes them compared to the corrupt and hypocritical politicians who exploit the poor.

== Cast ==
- Jiro Manio as Odie
- Coco Martin as Caloy
- Kristoffer King as Rex
- Nathan Lopez as Leo
- Harold Montano as Rod
- Jaclyn Jose as Zeny
- Julio Diaz as Diego

== Production ==
The movie was produced by Centerstage Productions, Rollingball Entertainment and Ignite Media. Tirador was distributed in the Philippines through the same production in 2007 and was also shown internationally in France through Swift Distribution and Peccadillo Pictures in 2009 in UK.

== Themes and symbolism ==
=== Low-life and character depth ===
The movie shows the cruelty of Philippine society and how a regular Filipino living in the slums survives each day.

=== Machismo ===
Tirador showed how men are forced into machismo, and how weak a human soul is. Evil has its own way to corrupt the minds of people in all social classes because of strong and selfish human urges.

== Impact ==
The main actors played realistic roles, that mirrored how men live in the slum area. The movie exposed the contrasts of corruption in all classes, where the influential was placed in the hot seat. It also showed the difference of societal levels and the animalistic instinct of humans to survive.
