= Saint Mary's College of Quezon City =

Roman Catholic college in Quezon City, Philippines

St. Mary's College Inc.
- Dalubhasaang Santa Maria ng Quezon City (Filipino)
- Former name: Colegio del Beaterio (1725–1939)
- Motto: Initium Sapientiae Timor Domini (Latin)
- Motto in English: The fear of the Lord is the beginning of wisdom.
- Type: Private, Catholic basic and higher education institution
- Established: 1725; 301 years ago
- Founder: Religious of the Virgin Mary
- Religious affiliation: Roman Catholic (RVM Sisters)
- Academic affiliations: PAASCU
- President: Sr. Maria Gilda M. Penafiel, RVM
- Location: 37 Mother Ignacia Avenue, Quezon City, Philippines; 14°38′3.22″N 121°1′29.46″E
- Campus: Urban
- Patroness: Blessed Virgin Mary
- Colors: Royal Blue
- Nickname: Marians
- Website: smciqc.edu.ph
- Location in Metro Manila Location in Luzon Location in the Philippines

St. Mary's College Inc., also referred to by its acronym SMCQC or as St. Mary's College, is a private Catholic basic and higher education institution for both boys and girls administered by the Religious of the Virgin Mary in Mother Ignacia Avenue, Quezon City, Philippines. It was established in 1725 by the RVM Sisters.

== Background ==
SMCQC is one of the oldest academic institutions in the Philippines, that offers formal education for girls in the Philippines.

A history tracing back to 1684, Ignacia del Espiritu Santo and her beatas started educating young Filipinas as part of their mission as a foundational community. In 1725, they opened a boarding school for girls which became known as Colegio del Beaterio. This also marked the first step towards formal education for the school. The Beaterio was opened to Yndias and Chinese mestizas, as well as to Spanish girls.

In 1901, the Beaterio became a congregation, eleven years after, the school was formally incorporated and the elementary and secondary course was recognized by the government. In 1939, the name Collegio del Beaterio was officially changed to St. Mary's College. The school was PAASCU accredited in 1975 and 1978.

The secondary department used to be exclusively for girls until school year 1997-1998, when it started to accept male enrollees. St. Mary's College Inc. is the de jure Generalate of all RVM schools in Luzon, and de facto Generalate of all RVM-controlled schools in the Philippines.

== Basic Education Department ==
- Grades 1-6 or Elementary School

Accredited by the Philippine Accrediting Association of Schools, Colleges, and Universities or PAASCU, St. Mary's College Inc. offers general elementary education geared towards academic preparation for high school.

- Grades 7-10 or Junior High School Accredited by the Philippine Accrediting Association of Schools, Colleges, and Universities, and certified by TüV Rheinland Philippines, St. Mary's College of Quezon City offers general secondary education geared toward academic preparation for college.
- Grades 11-12 or Senior High School

St. Mary's College Inc. offers SHS or Senior High School with the following Academic Tracks: Accountancy, Business and Management (ABM), Humanities and Social Sciences (HUMSS), Science, Technology, Engineering and Mathematics (STEM) AND General Academic Strand (GAS).

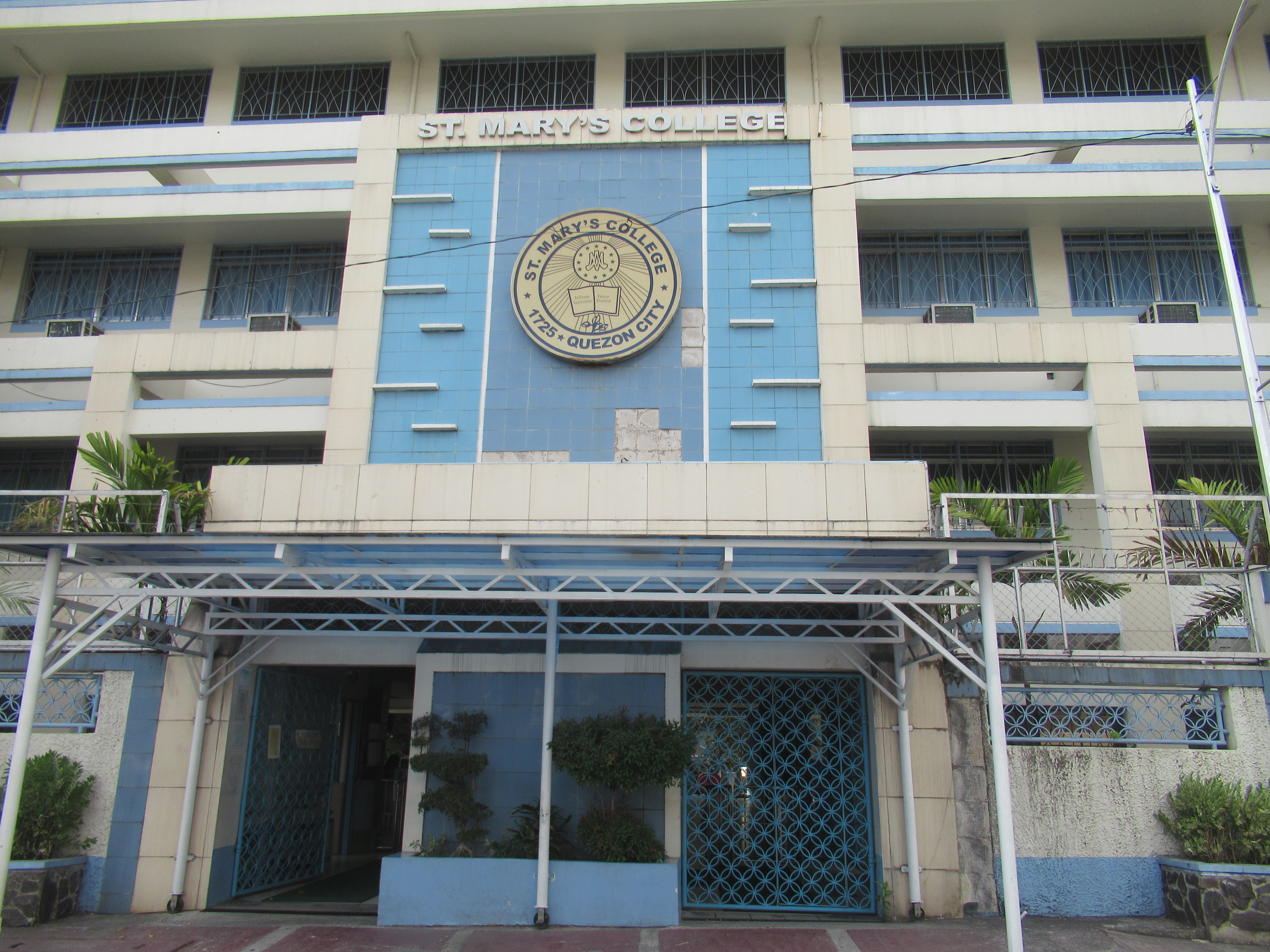
Facade

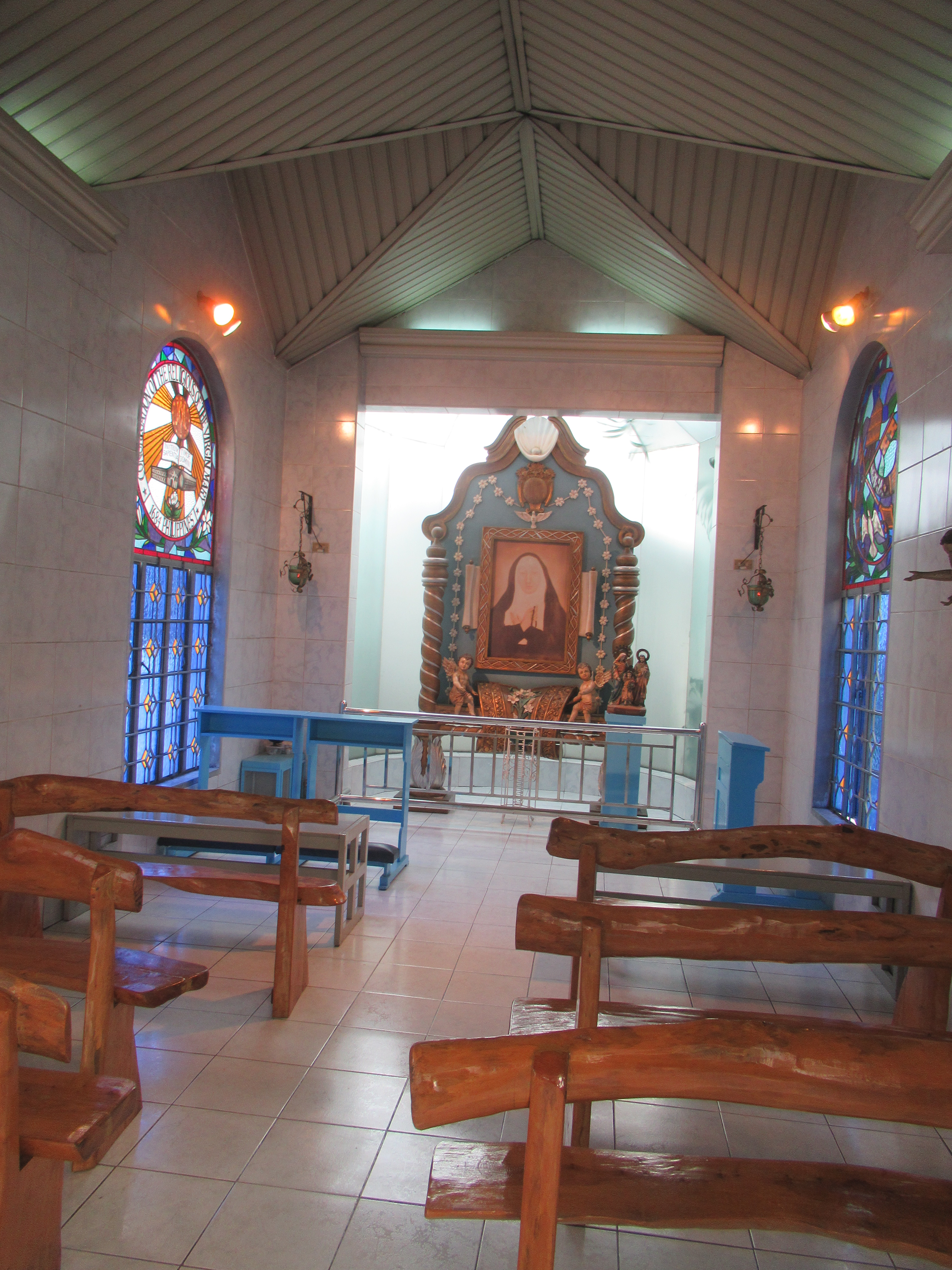
Ignacia del Espíritu Santo Shrine

== College Department ==
Administered by the Religious of the Virgin Mary or RVM, it is the response to the needs of the national and global community. Granted with PAASCU Level II. The school still offers limited course opportunities. College course offerings since 1950 included BSE, ETC, Secretarial, Associate in Arts, Bachelor of Music, Associate in Music, BSEED and other special courses. In 1976, the changing political, socioeconomic and cultural climate led the administrators to temporarily suspend the college. There was also a felt need to concentrate on basic education. In its desire to upgrade the equality of instruction, St. Mary's College Inc. embarked on a self-evaluation project which led to a formal application for accreditation through the Philippine Accrediting Association for Schools, Colleges and Universities (PAASCU). The High School department was accredited in 1975 and the Grade School department in 1978. Subsequently PAASCU visit confirmed the quality education offered by St. Mary's College Inc.. In 1997, St. Mary's College Inc. heeded the request of parents to admit boys to High School. With the continuing improvement in its instruction and services, The Board of Trustees thought it was time to resume the college. Preparations were done; in 2002, St. Mary's College Inc. was given the permit to start offering a Bachelor's Course in Communication Studies. In 2003, opened two tertiary education programs: Bachelor of Secondary Education and Bachelor of Elementary Education.

At present, the College Department of St. Mary's College Inc. offers the following programs: Bachelor of Science in Accounting and Information Science Bachelor of Science in Office Administration Bachelor of Science in Psychology Bachelor of Science in Social Work Bachelor of Arts in Communication Bachelor of Elementary Education (with specialization in: General Education, Pre- school Education) Bachelor of Secondary Education (major in: Mathematics, English, Biological Science)

Other programs being offered are Teacher Certificate Program, Language Proficiency course, Health Care Services NC II.

== Notable alumni ==
- Aiko Melendez - Actress
- Cherry Pie Picache - Actress and Screenwriter
- Kitkat (comedian) - Actress, TV Host, Comedienne
