= Boss Toyo =

- Born: Jayson Jay Luzadas; April 18, 1981 (age 45)
- Notable work: Pinoy Pawnstars YouTube series
- Spouse: Mary Jhoy
- Children: 2
- Musical career
- Origin: Cavite
- Genres: Rap
- Label: Blvck Entertainment

YouTube information
- Channel: Boss Toyo Production
- Years active: 2022–present
- Genres: Music; vlog
- Subscribers: 1.1 million
- Views: 285.9 million
- Last updated: July 8, 2025

Jayson Jay Luzadas (born April 18, 1981), known commonly as Boss Toyo, is a Filipino collector, vlogger, and rapper.

== Career ==
=== Collecting ===
Before collecting, Luzadas worked multiple jobs including being a sidecar delivery driver for water, a room boy, a factory worker, a tricycle driver, and a pharmacy employee. His first foray in the buy and sell business was with watches in 2014.

He later became known for buying memorabilia from various public figures in the Philippine entertainment industry. He started his ongoing YouTube series called Pinoy Pawnstars, which has featured these items in 2022.

Luzadas considers clothes, jerseys and photo memorabilia sold to him in 2023 by Abegail Rait, Francis Magalona's alleged former lover as his most prized possession. His most expensive possession is Billy Crawford's double platinum award which was given to its original owner for singing the theme song of Pokémon: The First Movie film. Luzadas acquired the item in 2025, which is worth ₱1 million.

His other items include memorabilia from film and television like the stone used by Darna to transform in the 2009 television series of the same name starring Marian Rivera and the coffin used in Rewind.

He opened the Pinoy Pawnstars Gallery in Quezon City in July 2025.

In 2025, Luzadas reportedly earned around ₱14 million in a span of two years.

=== Music ===
In 2023, Blvck Entertainment introduced Boss Toyo as a musical artist under its management. His single "Rap Lord" was released under the music label. In 2025, he released the single, "Geng-Geng".

== Personal life ==
A native of Cavite, Luzadas ran away from home when he was in sixth grade when he learned he was not the biological son of his adoptive parents. He has since reunited with his parents in his 30s.

"Boss Toyo" was a moniker given to him when he used to loiter in the streets. It came from Filipino slang meaning "crazy” or "weirdly unpredictable", or more accurately from the expression may toyo sa utak (lit. 'soy sauced brain'). During this time, he also became dependent on illegal drugs, and resorted to theft to fund his addiction.

After recovering from dengue, he decided to change his lifestyle. He was offered a job as a delivery boy and later married his partner Mary Jhoy. He has two sons, the younger being with Mary Jhoy.
