= American Adobo =

2001 film by Laurice Guillen

- Theatrical poster
- Directed by: Laurice Guillen
- Written by: Vincent Nebrida
- Produced by: Charo Santos-Concio; Kevin J. Foxe
- Starring: Cherry Pie Picache; Christopher de Leon; Dina Bonnevie; Ricky Davao; Paolo Montalban; Randy Becker; Sandy Andolong; Keesha Sharp
- Cinematography: Lee Meily
- Edited by: Efren Jarlego
- Music by: Nonong Buencamino
- Production companies: Star Cinema; Unitel Pictures; Magic Adobo Productions; Outrider Pictures
- Distributed by: Star Cinema (Philippines); Outrider Pictures (United States)
- Release dates: September 21, 2001 (San Diego Asian Film Festival); January 16, 2002 (Philippines); January 25, 2002 (United States)
- Running time: 104 minutes
- Countries: Philippines; United States
- Languages: Filipino; English
- Box office: US$344,992 (US)

American Adobo is a 2002 romantic comedy film directed by Laurice Guillen and produced by Kevin J. Foxe. The film stars Cherry Pie Picache, Keesha Sharp, Christopher de Leon, Dina Bonnevie, Ricky Davao, Paolo Montalban, Randy Becker, and Sandy Andolong. Written by Vincent Nebrida, it tells the story of five Filipino-American friends living in New York City dealing with love, sex, friendship, careers, and cultural identity. The title was derived from adobo, a popular dish in the Philippines. The film was released on January 16, 2002, in the Philippines and January 25, 2002, in the United States. American Adobo is notable for being the first ever film produced by Unitel Pictures.

== Plot ==
Tere Sanchez (Cherry Pie Picache) is an accountant who is in her early forties, single, and not especially happy about it. Tere is an excellent cook, and often throws dinner parties for her friends, and the arrival of her old friend Lorna (Sol Oca) from Manila is all the reason she needs to invite her friends over for a feast. Mike (Christopher De Leon) is a former political journalist who is now enjoying the fruits of a lucrative career as a newspaper editor, but he wonders if he left his principles behind along the way; he's also feeling unfulfilled in his marriage to Gigi (Susan Valdez-LeGoff). Gerry (Ricky Davao) is an advertising copywriter who is afraid to tell his friends and family that he's gay, though circumstances may well drive him out of the closet. Raul (Paolo Montalban) is a good-looking womaniser who prefers to date Caucasians, and lacks a certain amount of emotional maturity. And Marissa (Dina Bonnevie) is on the surface a well-to-do social butterfly; however, deep inside she's woefully insecure, and is afraid to confront her boyfriend Sam (Randy Becker) about his constant infidelity. Meanwhile, Lorna confesses that while she's married to a wealthy man in Manila, she's terribly unhappy, and is considering staying in America as an illegal alien.

== Cast ==
=== Main roles ===
- Christopher de Leon as Mike
- Dina Bonnevie as Marissa
- Ricky Davao as Gerry
- Cherry Pie Picache as Tere
- Paolo Montalban as Raul
- Randy Becker as Sam
- Keesha Sharp as Debbie
- Sandy Andolong as Emma

=== Supporting roles ===
- Gloria Romero as Gerry's mother
- Susan Valdez-LeGoff as Gigi Manalastas
- Sol Oca as Lorna
- Wayne Maugans as Chris
- Martha Millan as Candy Manalastas
- Lordi Villanueva as Lydia
- Jojo Gonzales as Frank
- Luis Pedron as Nonong
- Jason Verdadero as Mark
- Marcel Simoneau as Sal
- Traci Ann Wolfe as Denise

== Symbolism ==
Adobo is a very popular dish in the Philippines and aside from being a hearty viand in the film, it also serves as a symbolism of the clashes in the different struggles of the characters. Acidic vinegar, salty soy sauce, meat, salt, pepper, all are combined in a pot to produce adobo. In the film, despite the conflicts in their characters, in the end, everything ended up well, just like a well cooked adobo.

== Production ==
The film started out with a conversation in 1995 between Tony Gloria and Vincent Nebrida that there should be films depicting Filipino life in the US. Two months later Vincent finished a screenplay called "Magic Adobo" but only received attention from movie executives in April 1999, after four years since its conception. The entire movie was filmed in chilly October 2000 on location in Manhattan, Brooklyn, Queens, and Long Island, including a summertime pool party scene which required the actors, who were shivering between takes, to wear skimpy bathing suits outdoors. The scenes were filmed over a span of twenty days.

== Release ==
The film has been Rated-R by the MPAA for sexual situations, nudity and strong language.

=== Box office ===
The film had a very limited release in the United States on January 25, 2002, in 7 theaters for 3 consecutive days. The crew acquired a Mayor's permit to shut down the Queensboro Bridge for the premiere night of the film. The film grossed $41,001 on its opening day ranking it on 54th spot and by 3 days of screening the film went on to gross a total of $342,855 in the United States.

The film was released on VHS and on DVD on May 30, 2003, by First Look Pictures. The DVD featured an English and Spanish subtitles.

=== Critical response ===
On review aggregator Rotten Tomatoes, the film holds a rating of 30% based on 23 reviews, and an average rating of 4.6 out of 10. The site's consensus states: "The characters and situations seem borrowed from overwrought sitcoms." On Metacritic it has a weighted average score of 30 out of 100 based on 10 reviews, indicating "generally unfavorable" reviews.

John Anderson of the New York Newsday stated that "American Adobo is a tasty dish of a movie. A tender film with genuine insight into the urban heart. The way it treats the totally non-ethnic aspects of life--love, loneliness, dying, friendship--is what makes this Filipino film so attractive and also so American." Kevin Thomas of the Los Angeles Times stated that, "American Adobo is an intimate, good-humored comedy with lots of heart. Delicious and very funny!" while Andy Klein of San Francisco Weekly stated that, "American Adobo is sophisticated and entertaining. A solid step forward for the emerging Philippine-American cinema." Oliver Carnay of Asian Journal stated that "[the film] is rich, funny and entertaining. A gem reminiscent of Eat Drink Man Woman." The National Board Review was also very positive about the film saying, "A wonderful movie with a lot of heart. Among the year's top foreign language films" while Stephen Holden of The New York Times was less positive about the film stating that, "American Adobo certainly doesn't lack emotional energy, but it has two or three more plots than it can handle and plays like a compressed, strident soap opera."

== Accolades ==
=== Official selection ===
- 2002 San Diego Asian Film Festival
- 2002 Los Angeles Cinema Indios Festival
- 2003 Women's International Film Festival, South Korea
- 2003 Fukuoka International Film Festival, Japan

=== Los Angeles Cinema Indios Festival ===
- Winner best actor for Christopher De Leon
- Winner special achievement award

=== Star Awards ===
- Nominated best actor for Ricky Davao
- Nominated best new actor for Paolo Montalban

=== FAMAS Awards ===
- Winner best supporting actress for Cherry Pie Picache

=== Gawad Urian Awards ===
- Nominated best actor for Ricky Davao
- Nominated best actress for Cherry Pie Picache
- Nominated best actress for Dina Bonnevie
- Nominated best director for Laurice Guillen

=== Filipino Heritage Awards ===
- Winner most promising talent, Paolo Montalban

=== Extreme Awards ===
- Nominated best picture
