= Tribu (film) =

- Directed by: Jim Libiran
- Written by: Jim Libiran
- Produced by: Jim Libiran
- Starring: Karl Eigger Balingit; O.G. Sacred; Young Cent; Jamir Garcia; Gilbert Lozano; Ira Marasigan; Malou Crisologo; Rey Javier Guevarra; Havy Bagatsing; Charena Escala; Albert Moreno; Faye Martel
- Cinematography: Albert Banzon
- Edited by: Lawrence S. Ang
- Music by: Francis de Veyra
- Release dates: July 21, 2007 (Cinemalaya); December 3, 2008 (Philippines)
- Running time: 95 minutes
- Country: Philippines
- Language: Filipino

Tribu (English: Tribe) is a 2007 Filipino crime drama film directed by Jim Libiran, released in its home country of the Philippines. It stars real life gang members from the film's setting in Tondo, Manila. The tagline is: "Every night, juvenile tribes prowl the streets of Tondo. An explosive hiphop, freestyle gangsta celebration of inner city Manila."

Most of the actors were residents of Tondo, and many were active in street gang activities in the area during the making of the film. Fifty-two members of six rival gangs (Note: While most sources report that six gangs were used, Manycinemas referred to seven gangs.) agreed to work together to finish the movie.

Tribu won several awards, including Best Actors and Best Film at the Cinemalaya Independent Film Festival, Best Actor Ensemble at the Cinemanila International Film Festival and the Gawad Urian Awards. Tribu also won the Pari de l'Avenir Bet of the Future Award at the Festival Paris Cinéma – the only non-European film to do so.

== Plot ==
The film begins with a slideshow narrated by Ebet, a ten year old boy who resides in the Tondo district of Manila. He describes the poverty and crime in the city and explains how children have an opportunity to make a name for themselves in such an environment. After witnessing his mother having sex with a man during the Lakbayaw festival, he leaves the house and follows three adolescents: Memey and brothers Pongke and Dennis. Dennis expresses his desire to join the Thugz Angels, a gang centered around freestyle rapping, but is warned by his brother, who is concerned for his safety. While out tagging graffiti later that night, the gang comes across Totoy Turat, a member of the Sacred Brown Tribe who had been murdered on the street. Plainclothes police officers promptly arrive and arrest Memey while the rest of the gang flees, believing him to be responsible for the murder.

Makoy, a prominent member of the Sacred Brown Tribe, is awoken the next morning by his father, who laments the recent killing and expresses concern over his son being in a gang. Makoy is later accompanied by his friend Ghe-Ghe, and together they meet up with Mogs, also of the same gang, who brings along Ebet as a witness to confirm Memey's innocence. The three agree to meet up at Mogs' place later that night, while Ebet is instructed to spy on the Diablos, the rival gang suspected of killing Turat. Dennis, who is in a relationship with Katherine, Makoy's sister, arrives; Makoy asks him for a meeting with Pongke, seeking an alliance with Thugz Angels in order to exact revenge on the Diablos.

Ebet arrives at the Diablos' hangout after sundown, taking note of those who are present, before returning to Makoy with the news. Makoy returns home, smuggles a bag of weapons out of the house, and brings it to the Sacred Brown Tribe, hoping to gather more members for the attack. Thugz Angels arrive, led by Pongke, who offers the S.B.T. some weapons but explains that they cannot fight alongside the gang, fearing Memey's incarceration if they do. The two gangs gather by Turat's coffin and freestyle together. Katherine arrives to console Turat's mother, who is still mourning her son's death; Makoy instructs Dennis to care for his sister, and together they leave.

The S.B.T. meet up at Mogs' house, where they agree to fight the Diablos to the death. They arm themselves and directly attack the Diablos at their hangout. The fight goes awry for the S.B.T., and Mogs, Ghe-Ghe, and Makoy are killed while the surviving gang members retreat. Ebet, who remained an unseen observant of the fight, picks up Makoy's gun and runs off. Meanwhile, Dennis, who had been flirting with Katherine, bids her farewell as she boards a jeepney on the way to work. The remaining Diablos, finding Dennis alone, stab him on the street and flee. Pongke is enraged upon receiving news of his brother's death and hunts down the Diablos, killing them in the process.

Ebet returns home to hide from the police, where he spots his mother having sex in her bedroom with another man. He brandishes Makoy's gun and enters his mother's bedroom.

== Cast ==
Many of the main roles were played by actual gang members, some of whom used their real "gang alias" in the movie, such as O.G. Sacred, Young Cent and Raynoa.

- Karl Eigger Balingit as Ebet, a ten year old boy who bears witness to the street gang activity in Tondo.
- Charena Escala as Delia, Ebet's drug-addicted mother.
- Lloyd Labastida (Young Cent) as Pongke, the leader of the Thugz Angels.
- Restly Perez as Dennis, Pongke's brother.
- Reggie Dagondon as Memey, a member of the Thugz Angels who gets arrested.
- Shielbert Manuel (O.G. Sacred) as Makoy, prominent member of the Sacred Brown Tribe.
- Gilbert Lozano (Ghe-Ghe) as Ghe-Ghe, a close friend of Makoy.
- Jamir Garcia as Mogs, a member of the Sacred Brown Tribe who uses Ebet as a witness.
- Ray Javier Guevarra as Mang Kaloy, Makoy's father, a stern old man who is concerned about his son's safety.
- Malou Crisologo as Mameng, Makoy's mother.
- Faye Martel as Ina ni Ghe-Ghe, Ghe-Ghe's mother.

== Production ==
Director Jim Libiran was born and raised in Tondo, where his initial fascination with street gangs began. While working as a highly respected television journalist, he produced a documentary involving youth gangs. "As a journalist, gangs were my obsession," he said in an interview. After returning to school to study filmmaking, Libiran drafted a script that would later evolve into Tribu.

Libiran's knowledge of the neighborhood enabled him to recruit six rival gangs to collaborate for the film, promoting it as a tool for "conflict resolution" and to foster peace between the gangs. His style of filmmaking involved working with local communities in order to establish lasting effects after the film's release. He often had to deal with the fact that some of his cast members were being pursued by rival gangs or the police, and production was occasionally interrupted by incarcerations or shootings. Several members showed up at the acting workshop held by Libiran armed with weapons.

Tribu was shot in 12 days and costed approximately ₱1.5 million to produce.

== Reception ==
Tribu won nine awards and several nominations, and has been praised in its homeland of the Philippines. The success of the film sparked an increase in independent filmmaking in the country. Libiran received a Gawad Balanghai trophy and ₱1.2 million in grants. The six gangs that collaborated to produce Tribu have since expanded on their production of rap music, performing around Manila and training local artists, and had even considered producing their own album.

Manunuri ng Pelikulang Pilipino pointed out the gritty portrayal of the Tondo district in the film: "[Libiran's] Tondo reeks of the true effluent of human sewage, pulsing with the din and blare of its noise and confusion, to the howl of animals led to their slaughter in Vitas [...] Gangs foster fellowship though the brutality of hazing and the camaraderie of drinking sessions. They celebrate life in and out of season, even as they seem bent on a bloodbath for the killing season. There’s no let-up to life and passion."

Richard Kuipers of Variety wrote that Tribu "[takes] the viewer deep inside a Manila slum blighted by drugs and gang violence [...] a disturbing snapshot of a community in chaos." He also praised the film's video and sound quality despite the challenging filming locations. Screen International described it as "[a] powerful but downbeat portrait of a world ruled by the vicious circle of poverty and crime, focuses on its main victims, the young generation, angrily self-destructing itself out of sheer desperation." Many viewers noted the film's similarities with City of God and Amores perros, although Libiran has denied this comparison.

Tribu, along with independent film Pisay, were also screened at the 2007 Pusan International Film Festival. Maggie Lee of The Hollywood Reporter praised the film for its live rap music, writing that "each song is a unique voice articulating the rough-hewn vitality of [the gangster's] existence."

While the film has garnered critical acclamation, the International Herald Tribune noted that the film failed to address the response from governments and law enforcement regarding street crime, such as police-supported death squads that regularly hunt down and kill suspected gang members. Libiran has since addressed these issues in public appearances; following the film's release, Libiran appealed to the police and government of Manila at Cinemalaya, asking them to "have mercy" and to not kill youth that had been influenced by criminal activity. The film has also been criticized for its excessive use of violence, to which Libiran responded, "How can it glorify gangs when they all ended [sic] up dead?", and also notes that O.G. Sacred, the gangster who played Makoy in the film, said that he would not have joined gangs if he had seen Tribu as a child.

== Awards and nominations ==
Cinemalaya Independent Film Festival 2007

- Won: Best Actors - Ensemble
- Won: Best Film - Full Length Feature
- Won: Best Sound (Mark Laccay)

Cinemanila International Film Festival

- Won: Best Actor Ensemble
- Won: Best Actress Ensemble

Festival Paris Cinema

- Won: Pari de l'Avenir (Bet of the Future Award)

31st Gawad Urian Awards

- Won: Best Music (Francis de Veyra)
- Nominated: Best Picture (8 Glasses Productions)
- Nominated: Best Director (Jim Libiran)
- Nominated: Best Screenplay
- Nominated: Best Actor (O. G. Sacred)
- Nominated: Best Supporting Actress (Malou Crisologo)
- Nominated: Best Production Design (Armi Cacanindin)
- Nominated: Best Cinematography (Albert Banzon)
- Nominated: Best Editing (Lawrence Ang)
- Nominated: Best Sound (Mark Laccay)

Gawad TANGLAW 2007

- Won: Best Film
- Won: Best Director (Jim Libiran)

Notably, Tribu was the only non-European film to win at the Festival Paris Cinema. Tribu competed with films from France, Japan, China, Haiti, Mexico, Great Britain and Hungary-Germany.
