= Manay Po =

2006 film by Joel Lamangan

Manay Po (a.k.a. Oring, Orang, Oroses)
- Theatrical film poster
- Directed by: Joel C. Lamangan
- Screenplay by: Dinno Erece
- Story by: Lily Y. Monteverde; Dinno Erece
- Produced by: Lily Y. Monteverde
- Starring: Cherry Pie Picache; John Prats; Polo Ravales; Jiro Manio
- Cinematography: Rolly Manuel
- Edited by: Marya Ignacio
- Music by: Vincent de Jesus
- Production company: Regal Films
- Distributed by: Regal Entertainment
- Release date: May 31, 2006 (Philippines)
- Running time: 98 minutes
- Country: Philippines
- Language: Filipino

Manay Po! (a.k.a. Oring, Orang, Oroses) is a 2006 Filipino gay-themed comedy film directed by Joel C. Lamangan and starring Cherry Pie Picache, Polo Ravales, John Prats and Jiro Manio. The film grossed "a phenomenal" ₱6 million on its opening day. It was followed in 2008 by the sequel Manay Po 2: Overload. This movie is based on Mano Po, also produced by Regal Films.

== Plot ==
A mother has three boys, but the oldest is a bisexual, the other is openly gay and the youngest is confused about his gender identity. The eldest is an engineer, the other one is an Arts student and the youngest is a high school student. All is fine until a problem appears. The mother and her boyfriend was robbed and the jewelry set cannot be returned incomplete and she was short of cash. The middle son, rejected by his crush, decides to give his expenses for a gown to add to the balance. The eldest, initially angry, tried to solicit his partner/couple to reduce their savings to help his mother. The eldest son is officially a couple, the middle wins the beauty pageant and the youngest, content with his identity.

== Cast ==
- Cherry Pie Picache as Luzviminda Catacutan
- John Prats as Orson Castello
- Polo Ravales as Oscar Dimagiba
- Jiro Manio as Orwell Castello
- Luis Alandy as Adrian Pengson
- Mike Tan as Marky
- Glaiza de Castro as Pauleen
- IC Mendoza as Frida
- Theo Bernados as Robin
- LJ Reyes as Gina
- Christian Vasquez as Gerry
- Bearwin Meily as Marco
- Giselle Sanchez as Maritess
- Charles Christianson as Cher
- Jim Pebanco as Rouel
- Justin De Leon as Rowin
- Encar Benedicto as Annabelle
- Allan Paule as Jonathan

== Recognition ==
=== Awards and nominations ===
- 2007, nominated for a [Philippines Golden Screen Award as 'Best Motion Picture - Musical or Comedy' for Regal Films
- 2007, nominated for a Philippines Golden Screen Award as 'Best Performance by an Actress in a Leading Role (Musical or Comedy)' for Cherry Pie Picache
