= Cherry Pie Picache =

Filipino actress

- Picache in 2019
- Born: Cherry Pie Sison Picache; 1971 (age 54–55)
- Occupation: Actress
- Years active: 1988–present
- Children: 1
- Awards: Full list

Cherry Pie Sison Picache (born 1971) is a Filipino actress. Known primarily for her versatile work across independent films, blockbusters and television productions, she has received numerous accolades, including two Durban International Film Festival Awards, an Osian's Cinefan Festival of Asian and Arab Cinema Awards, two Asian Television Awards, three Gawad Urian Awards, two Metro Manila Film Festival Award and a Luna Award. In 2006, S Magazine named her one of Philippine cinema's best actresses of all time.

== Biography ==
She attended Saint Mary's College of Quezon City, St. Paul University Quezon City, and took up dentistry at Centro Escolar University. Picache made her television debut in the soap opera Familia Zaragoza aired on ABS-CBN in 1996, and received more projects from that network. She is currently a part of ABS-CBN management.

Picache is renowned for her maternal roles in television. She has starred in hit top-rating teleseryes such as Saan Ka Man Naroroon, Sa Puso Ko Iingatan Ka, Tayong Dalawa, Noah, My Binondo Girl, Ina, Kapatid, Anak, Ikaw Lamang, On the Wings of Love, Asintado and The Blood Sisters. Presently, she portrays Marites Dimaguiba in FPJ's Batang Quiapo.

== Personal life ==
Picache has a son from her previous relationship.

In September 2014, Picache's mother, Zenaida, was found dead after several stab wounds. Zenaida's houseboy Michael Icoy Flores was the killer, and was sentenced to 40 years in prison.

== Filmography ==
=== Film ===
Year	Title	Role	Notes
1991	Hinukay Ko Na ang Libingan Mo	Janet	
1991	Kailan Ka Magiging Akin	Lourdes	
1991	Kumukulong Dugo		
1992	Hiram Na Mukha	Shirley	
1992	Robin Gud		
1992	Hinukay Ko Na ang Libingan Mo	Janet	
1992	Lumaban Ka Sagot Kita		
1992	Kailan Ka Magiging Akin	Lourdes	
1992	Patayin si Billy Zapanta – Order of Battle: Enemy No. 1	Veka Salvador	
1993	Ligaw-ligawan, Kasal-kasalan, Bahay-Bahayan		Frame segment
1993	Buhay ng Buhay Ko		
1993	Makati Ave.: Office Girls	Cheng Rodrigo	
1994	Multo in the City	Vangie	
1994	Oplan: Mindanao		
1994	Buhay ng Buhay Ko		
1994	Loretta		
1994	Muntik Na Kitano Minahal		
1994	Nag-iisang Bituin		
1994	Sibak: Midnight Dancers		
1995	Kahit Harangan ng Bala		
1995	Araw-araw, Gabi-gabi		
1995	Baby Love	Ching Laperal	
1995	Sana Maulit Muli	Cynthia	
1995	Hataw Na!		
1995	Pamilya Valderama	Carmen	
1996	Impakto	Noemi	
1996	Ama, Ina, Anak	Susan	
1996	Bayarang Puso		
1996	Kung Alam Mo Lang	Susan	
1996	Abot-Kamay ang Pangarap	Amay	
1996	Nag-iisang Ikaw	Kellu Alejo	
1996	Nasaan Ka Nang Kailangan Kita		
1997	Huwag Mo Nang Itanong		
1997	Minsan Lamang Magmamahal	Gina	
1997	Batang PX	Sarah	
1997	Kahit Minsan Lang	Denia	
1997	Hanggang Kailan Kita Mamahalin?		
1997	The Sarah Balabagan Story	Gina	
1997	Kulayan Natin ang Bukas		
1997	Kokey	Trining	
1998	Ikaw Na Sana	Corazon Rosales-Perez	
1998	Ala Eh... con Bisoy, Hale-Hale-Hoy! Laging Panalo ang Mga Unggoy		
1998	Bata, Bata... Pa'no Ka Ginawa?	Sr. Ann	
1998	Hiling	Shirley	
1998	Puso ng Pasko	Ophelia Carpio	
1999	Peque Gallaga's Scorpio Nights 2	Mona	
1999	Burlesk King	Aileen	
1999	Bayaning 3rd World		
2000	Anak	Mercy	
2000	Tanging Yaman	Nanette	
2001	Mila	Rona	
2001	American Adobo	Mike	
2002	Got 2 Believe		
2003	Magnifico	Cristy	
2003	Noon at Ngayon: Pagsasamang Kay Ganda	Maritess	
2004	Bridal Shower		
2004	Feng Shui	Lily Mendoza	
2004	Santa Santita	Sister Dolor	International title: Magdalena, The Unholy Saint
2005	Birhen ng Manaoag		
2005	Bahay ni Lola 2	Tita Belle	
2005	Bikini Open	Susan Ferrer-Logarta	
2005	Ako Legal Wife: Mano Po 4?	Patty	
2006	Summer Heat	Jesusa	Original title: Kaleldo
2006	Manay Po	Luzviminda "Luz" Catacutan	
2006	I Wanna Be Happy		
2006	First Day High	Indi's mom	
2006	Twilight Dancers	Madam Loca	
2006	'Wag Kang Lilingon	Aling Rosing	
2007	Foster Child	Thelma	
2008	Manay Po 2: Overload	Luzviminda "Luz" Catacutan	
2008	Boses	Amanda	
2008	Ang Tanging Ina N'yong Lahat	Vice President Ren Constantino	
2009	When I Met U	Chonching	
2010	Here Comes the Bride	Doris	
2010	Noy	Letty	
2010	Hating Kapatid	Rica and Cecil's mother	
2010	Super Inday and the Golden Bibe	Monina	
2010	Ang Tanging Ina Mo: Last Na 'To!	President Ren Constantino	
2011	Isda		
2011	The Woman in the Septic Tank	Herself	Cameo appearance Original title: Ang Babae Sa Septic Tank
2012	Just One Summer	Juliet	
2012	The Strangers	Evelyn	
2013	The Bit Player	Herself / Ma'am Amelia	Original title: Ekstra
2013	Raketeros		Cameo appearance
2013	Alamat ni China Doll		
2014	Feng Shui 2	Lily Mendoza	
2015	Etiquette for Mistresses	Betsy Galvez-Villoria	
2015	Manang Biring	Nita	Voice role
2016	Whistleblower		
2016	Pedicab	Aling Remedios	Original title: Pauwi Na
2016	The Third Party	Carina Medina	
2017	Can't Help Falling in Love	Mama Em	
2017	Love You to the Stars and Back	Linda	
2018	Pang MMK		
2018	Jack Em Popoy: The Puliscredibles	Valerie Montenegro	
2023	Ten Little Mistresses	Charo	
2023	Oras de Peligro	Beatriz	
2023	Firefly	Linda Alvaro	
2025	Fatherland		
2025	The Last Beergin	Tere	

=== Television ===
Year	Title	Role	Source
1988	Palibhasa Lalake	Patricia/Tricia (guest star on November 22, 1988)	
1989–1990	Student Canteen	Host	
1996	Bayani	Ignacia del Espiritu Santo	
1996–1997	Familia Zaragoza	Elena	
1997–1998	Ikaw Na Sana	Corazon Rosales-Perez	
1997–2002	!Oka Tokat	Michelle	
1998–1999	Mula sa Puso	Shirley Mercado	
1999–2001	Saan Ka Man Naroroon	Dolores Sarmeniego-Ocampo	
2001–2003	Sa Puso Ko Iingatan Ka	Becky Pagsisisihan	
2002–2003	Bituin	Olivia	
2003–2004	Sana'y Wala Nang Wakas	Elizabeth/Yvette Valencia	
2003–2004	Wansapanataym	Nanay	
2004	Maid in Heaven	Encar	
2005	Pablo S. Gomez's Kampanerang Kuba	Jacinta	
2005–2006	Makuha Ka sa Tikim	Herself - Host	
2006–2007	Atlantika	Remedios	
2006	Mga Kwento ni Lola Basyang	Binday	
2007	Sineserye Presents: Hiram na Mukha	Rose Ponce	
2007	Maalaala Mo Kaya	Anita Ferrer	
2007	Pangarap na Bituin	Alberta Tuazon	
2007	Maalaala Mo Kaya	Cyntia	
2008	Iisa Pa Lamang	Isadora Fuentes-Castillejos	
2008	Maalaala Mo Kaya	Lucing	
2009	Tayong Dalawa	Marlene Dionisio-Garcia	
2009	Sineserye Presents: Florinda	Criselda Bautista	
2010	Maalaala Mo Kaya	Mrs. Santelices	
2010	Rubi	Vivian Rodrigo / Rosana "Rose" Perez	
2010	Agimat: Ang Mga Alamat ni Ramon Revilla: Elias Paniki	Maria Sta. Maria	
2010	Maalaala Mo Kaya	Zoriada	
2010–2011	Noah	Rebecca De Leon	
2011	100 Days to Heaven	Myrna Soledad	
2011–2012	My Binondo Girl	Jean Dimasupil-Sy	
2012	Maalaala Mo Kaya	Adelaida	
2012–2013	Ina, Kapatid, Anak	Theresa C. Apolinario-Buenaventura	
2013	Wansapanataym	Lavander	
2014	Ikaw Lamang	Elena Severino-Hidalgo	
2015	Wansapanataym	Linda Gutierrez	
2015–2016	On the Wings of Love	Jacqueline "Tita Jack" Fausto	
2016	Karelasyon	Lina	
2016	Karelasyon	Elena	
2016	FPJ's Ang Probinsyano	Linda Aguilar	
2017	The Promise of Forever	Vivienne Zialcita-Madrid	
2018	Asintado	Celeste "Miss C" Ramos	
2018	The Blood Sisters	Adele Magtibay	
2019	Ipaglaban Mo!: Hostage	Lolit	
2019	Call Me Tita	Ruth Evasco	
2019–2020	Sandugo	Joan Reyes	
2020–2021	Walang Hanggang Paalam	Amelia Hernandez	
2021–2022	Marry Me, Marry You	Elvira "Elvie" Manansala-Zamora	
2023—2026	FPJ's Batang Quiapo	Ma. Teresa "Marites" Asuncion/Guerrero-Dimaguiba	

== Awards and recognitions ==
=== International awards ===
Osian's Cinefan Festival of Asian and Arab Cinema
Year	Nominated work	Category	Result
2007	Foster Child	Best Actress	Won

Durban International Film Festival
Year	Nominated work	Category	Result
2008	Foster Child	Best Actress	Won
2007	Summer Heat	Best Actress	Won

=== Philippine awards ===
FAMAS (Filipino Academy of Movie Arts and Sciences Awards)
Year	Nominated work	Category	Result
2007	Summer Heat	Best Actress	Nominated
2006	Mano Po 4: Ako Legal Wife	Best Supporting Actress	Nominated
2003	American Adobo	Best Supporting Actress	Nominated

Luna Awards
Year	Nominated work	Category	Result
2011	Noy	Best Supporting Actress	Nominated
2007	I wanna be Happy	Best Supporting Actress	Nominated
2003	American Adobo	Best Supporting Actress	Won

Gawad Urian
Year	Nominated work	Category	Result
2012	Isda	Best Actress	Nominated
2011		Best Actress of the Decade	Won
2008	'Foster Child'	Best Actress	Won
2007	Summer Heat	Best Actress	Nominated
2004	Bridal Shower	Best Actress	Won
2003	American Adobo	Best Actress	Nominated
2000	Burlesk King	Best Supporting Actress	Nominated
1997	Abot Kamay ang Pangarap	Best Supporting Actress	Nominated
1994	Makati Ave.: Office Girls	Best Supporting Actress	Nominated

Golden Screen Movie Awards
Year	Nominated work	Category	Result
2013		Dekada Award	Won
2011	Noy	Best Supporting Actress - Drama	Nominated
2009	Boses	Best Supporting Actress - Drama	Nominated
2008	Foster Child	Best Actress - Drama	Won
2007	Summer Heat	Best Actress - Drama	Nominated
2007	Manay Po	Best Actress - Musical or Comedy	Nominated
2007	Twilight Dancers	Best Supporting Actress - Drama	Won
2006	Mano Po 4: Ako Legal Wife	Best Supporting Actress - Drama	Nominated
2006	Bikini Open	Best Supporting Actress - Musical or Comedy	Nominated
2004	Bridal Shower	Best Actress - Musical or Comedy	Won

Metro Manila Film Festival
Year	Nominated work	Category	Result
2012	The Strangers	Best Supporting Actress	Nominated
2005	Mano Po 4: Ako Legal Wife	Best Supporting Actress	Won

Star Awards for Movies
Year	Nominated work	Category	Result
2008	Foster Child	Movie Actress of the Year	Nominated
2007	Summer Heat	Movie Actress of the Year	Nominated
2007	Twilight Dancers	Movie Supporting Actress of the Year	Nominated
2006	Bikini Open	Movie Actress of the Year	Nominated
2006	Mano Po 4: Ako Legal Wife	Movie Supporting Actress of the Year	Nominated

Young Critics Circle
Year	Nominated work	Category	Result
2008	Foster Child	Best Performance by Male or Female, Adult or Child, Individual or Ensemble in Leading or Supporting Role	Nominated
2007	Summer Heat	Best Performance by Male or Female, Adult or Child, Individual or Ensemble in Leading or Supporting Role	Nominated
2001	Tanging Yaman	Best Performance by Male or Female, Adult or Child, Individual or Ensemble in Leading or Supporting Role	Won^{I}

== Note ==
^I Shared with Entire Cast of Tanging Yaman.
