= Pedicab (film) =

- Tagalog: Pauwi Na
- Directed by: Paolo Villaluna
- Written by: Paolo Villaluna; Ellen Ramos
- Produced by: Ellen Ramos
- Starring: Bembol Roco; Cherry Pie Picache; Meryll Soriano; Jerald Napoles; Jess Mendoza; Chai Fonacier
- Cinematography: Sasha Palomares
- Edited by: Paolo Villaluna; Ellen Ramos
- Music by: Paolo Villaluna; Pike Ramirez; Veena Ramirez
- Distributed by: Solar Films
- Release dates: July 13, 2016 (ToFarm Film Festival); August 16, 2017 (Philippines)
- Country: Philippines
- Language: Filipino

Pedicab (Filipino: Pauwi Na) is a 2016 Philippine social realist drama film directed by Paolo Villaluna and produced by Ellen Ramos. The tandem of Villaluna-Ramos also co-wrote and co-edited the film. It was selected in the main competition of the 20th Shanghai International Film Festival where it won the Golden Goblet for Best in Feature Film. Its win makes Pedicab (Pauwi Na) only the 4th full-feature film in the history of Philippine cinema to ever win the top prize in an A-list international film festival. It has an ensemble cast led by Philippine icons Bembol Roco and Cherry Pie Picache.

== Plot ==
Inspired by a news article featured in the Philippine Daily Inquirer (“Family pedals way back home to Leyte,” Sept. 7, 2003), Pauwi Na (PEDICAB) follows Mang Pepe and his family as they pedal on pedicabs (cycle rickshaws) the thousands of miles from Manila to the farmlands.

The ailing Mang Pepe (Bembol Roco), his wife, Remedios (Cherry Pie Picache), their daughter Pina (Chai Fonacier), their son JP (Jerald Napoles), his wife Isabel (Meryll Soriano) and their dog Kikay live together in a shanty in the slums. Survival is hand-to-mouth. Mang Pepe drives his rusting pedicab to deliver goods to the market. Aling Remedios washes laundry for her neighbors. JP steals, Pina sells cigarettes, and Isabel, blind and soon to give birth, believes she can see and speak to Jesus Christ.

Mang Pepe convinces the family that life will be better farming in their home province. Without the money to pay for bus fare or the means to survive on the road, the family piles into a pair of pedicabs, determined to pedal their way home.

== Casting ==
The film is an ensemble piece and stars Bembol Roco, Cherry Pie Picache, Meryll Soriano, Jerald Napoles, Jess Mendoza and Chai Fonacier. Villaluna said that he thinks the reason why it took so long for the film to be produced was because he was waiting for the perfect cast, and that Bembol and Cherry Pie “were destined” to be in the film.

This was also Cherry Pie's return to acting after the film Isda (2014, Adolfo Alix Jr.) because “I didn’t find anything interesting until I got the script from Paolo. I said this was what I’ve been waiting for. I said that if I’d do another indie, I want it to be memorable, significant and relevant."

Bembol Roco, iconic lead of Maynila Sa Kuko ng Liwanag (Lino Brocka, 1975) compared Villaluna to 70's directors Brocka and Bernal “Lino and Ishmael were actors’ directors. More than themselves, their concern was for their actors to shine in their films. They helped us in characterization. That's what Direk Paolo did for all of us.”

== Cast ==
- Bembol Roco as Mang Pepe
- Cherry Pie Picache as Aling Remedios
- Meryll Soriano as Isabel
- Jerald Napoles as JP
- Chai Fonacier as Pina
- Jess Mendoza as Jesus
- Shamaine Buencamino as Doray

== Production ==
Pedicab is the comeback film of director Paolo Villaluna after a 7-year absence from filmmaking. According to Villaluna, the script has been written since 2006 together with Ellen Ramos. It went through several commercial studios but demands of a happier ending made Villaluna-Ramos decide to shelf it.

After the script was accepted in 2016 to a local grant-giving film festival, ToFarm Film Festival, the filmmakers decided to pursue the production.

It is executive produced by Dr. Milagros O. How, the patron of the ToFarm Film Festival.

== Release ==
It was first screened in August 2016 as part of the week-long local competitive Tofarm Film Festival. It was widely reviewed as one of the best in the festival and eventually won the Special Jury Prize, Best Acting nods for both Bembol Roco and Cherry Pie Picache, Best Story, Best Editing and Best Production Design.

In June 2017, an invitation was extended for the film to compete in the Shanghai International Film Festival, the only Southeast Asian film in competition. Jury members included Cao Baoping (Chinese Director, Screenwriter, Producer), Li Qiang (Chinese Screenwriter), Milcho Manchevski (Macedonian Director), Sabu (Japanese Director), Gary Michael Walters (American Producer), and Xu Qing (Chinese Actress).

On August 16, 2017 it had a nationwide screening as part of the non-competitive Philippine film festival, Pista ng Pelikulang Pilipino.

== Reception ==
The return of Paolo Villaluna and Ellen Ramos was positively received by critics. Rito Asilo of the Philippine Daily Inquirer described the work as emotionally resonant, noting the filmmakers' consistent track record Additionally, the project was praised for its strong screenplay, European-influenced style, and effective blend of dramatic and comedic elements, characterizing it as a significant return to independent filmmaking for Villaluna.

It was similarly praised by major Philippine newspapers and critics including Manila Times, Businessmirror, and PhilStar. It garnered 7 Urian nomations, 5 Luna awards nominations, and 9 PMPC Star awards nominations, the country's major award giving bodies.

At the Shanghai International Film Festival, it won the Golden Goblet, the festival's highest honor where jury head Cristian Mungiu (Romanian Director) stated, “For the humanism and universality of the story, for the simplicity of the style and realization – for the non-conformism with which it represented our desire to believe that there is a sense in this Universe, the award for the Best Film goes to PEDICAB, from the Philippines.”
