= Sandugo (TV series) =

Philippine action drama series

- Also known as: Fists of Fate
- Genre: Action drama; Crime
- Created by: Reggie Amigo
- Written by: Camille Anne dela Cruz; Wilbert Christian Tan
- Directed by: Darnel Joy R. Villaflor; Ram Tolentino
- Starring: Ejay Falcon; Aljur Abrenica; Elisse Joson; Jessy Mendiola; Cherry Pie Picache; Vina Morales; Gardo Versoza; Ariel Rivera
- Theme music composer: Nonong Buencamino; Jose Bartolome; Gary Valenciano
- Opening theme: "Natutulog Ba ang Diyos" by Sam Mangubat
- Country of origin: Philippines
- Original language: Filipino
- No. of seasons: 1
- No. of episodes: 125 (list of episodes)

Production
- Executive producers: Carlo Katigbak; Cory Vidanes; Laurenti Dyogi; Roldeo T. Endrinal
- Producer: Ronald Dantes Atianzar
- Production locations: Metro Manila, Philippines; Subic, Zambales, Philippines; Negros Occidental, Philippines
- Editors: Jake Maderazo; Jeric Hernandez; Raymond Samaniego; Yeizel Gatdula; Marlow Malvar
- Production company: Dreamscape Entertainment

Original release
- Network: ABS-CBN
- Release: September 30, 2019 – March 20, 2020

Sandugo (International title: Fists of Fate / transl. One Blood) is a Philippine television drama action series broadcast by ABS-CBN. Directed by Darnel Joy R. Villaflor and Ram Tolentino, it stars Ejay Falcon, Aljur Abrenica, Elisse Joson, Jessy Mendiola, Cherry Pie Picache, Vina Morales, Gardo Versoza and Ariel Rivera. It aired on the network's Kapamilya Gold line up and worldwide on TFC from September 30, 2019 to March 20, 2020.

== Premise ==
Sandugo was the story of two brothers who grew up separately and ended up on opposing sides. JC and Aris are fraternal twins who did things together as kids. While Aris is a strong and athletic boy, JC is suffering from a congenital heart ailment and is in dire need of an operation. Their parents tried their best to earn money for the treatment, but JC's time is running out. In an act of desperation, their mother gives up Aris for adoption, receiving a hefty sum in return. Soon, JC and Leo will face each other from opposing sides of the law not knowing they are brothers. Will they wage war against each other or will their hearts remember that they are brothers of one blood?

== Cast and characters ==
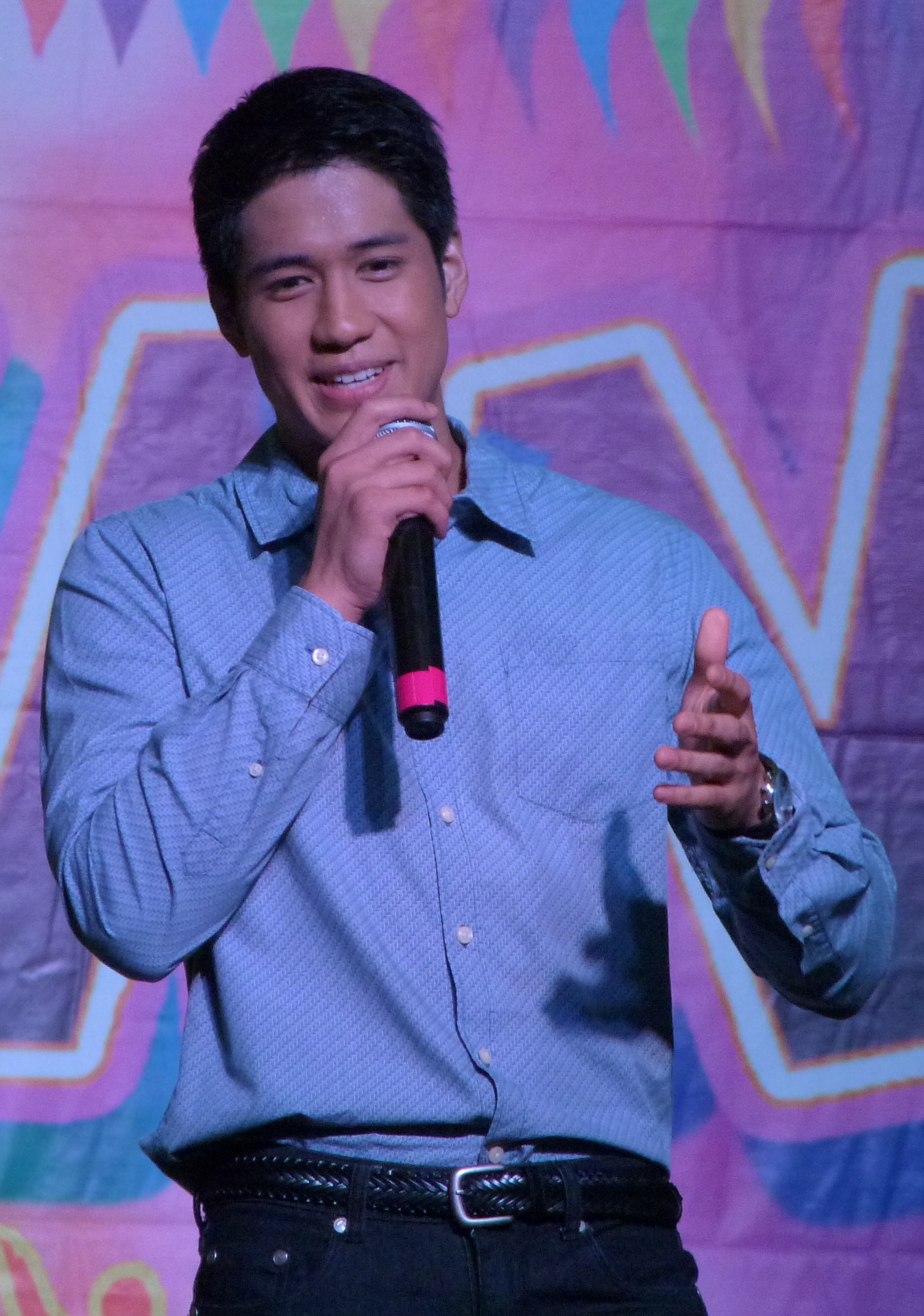
Aljur Abrenica portrays Aristotle "Aris" Reyes / Leo Balthazar.

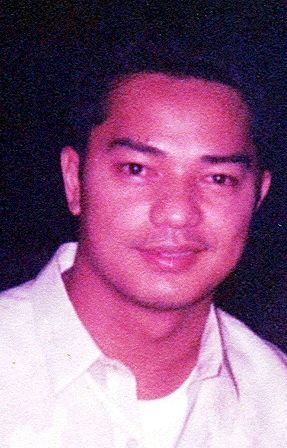
Ariel Rivera portrays Eugene Reyes.

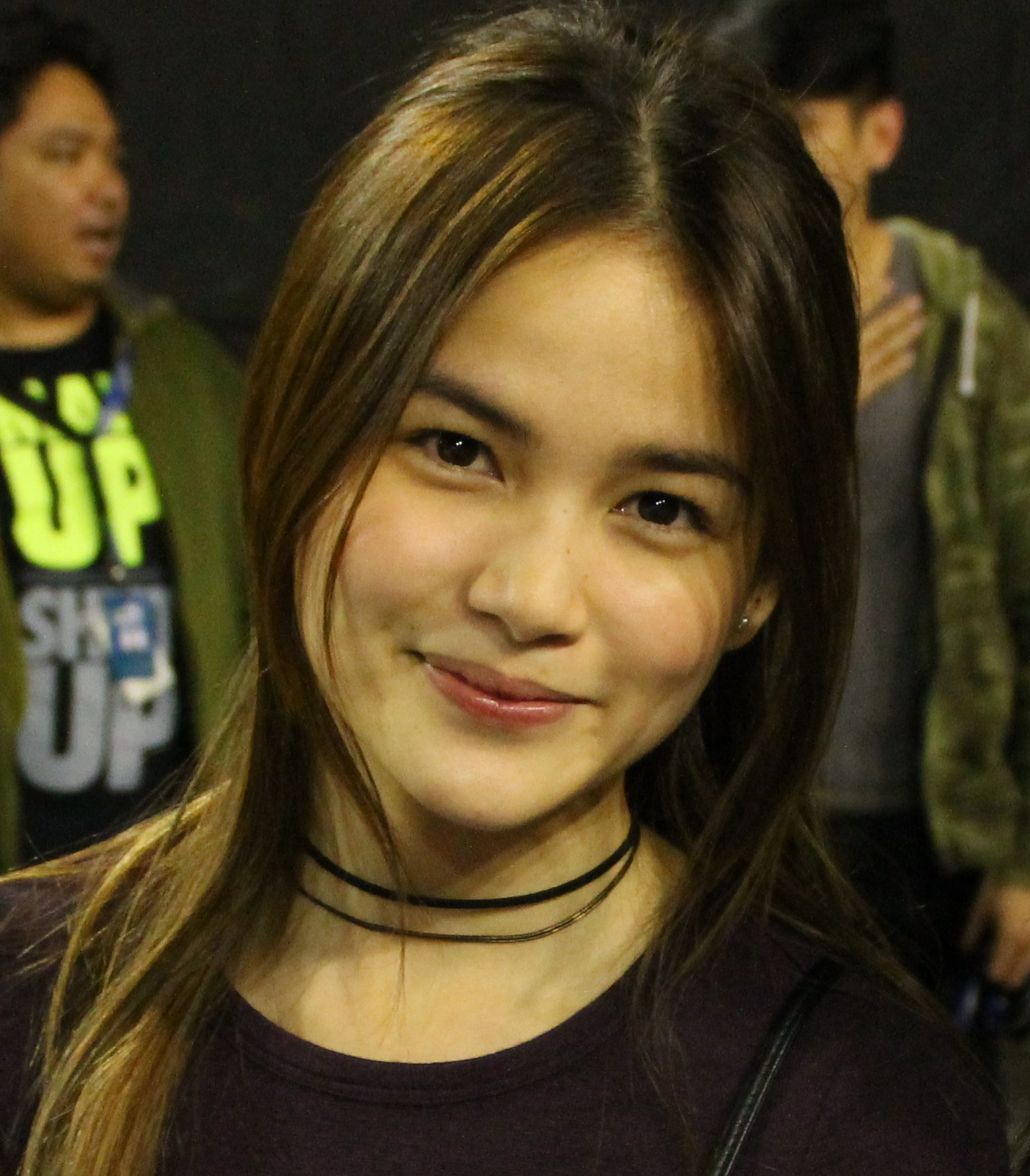
Elisse Joson portrays Grace Policarpio.

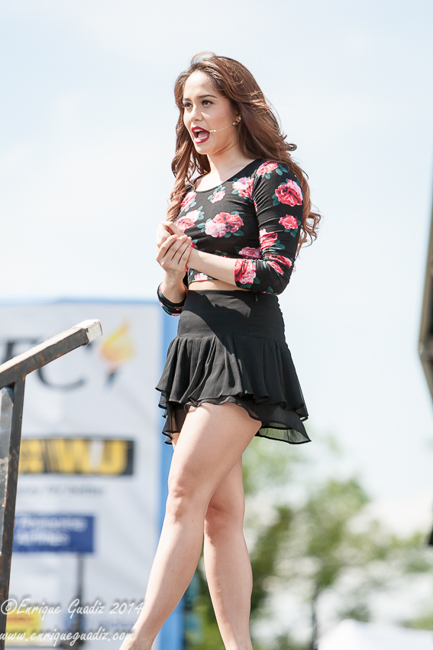
Jessy Mendiola portrays Melissa "Melai" Pamintuan.

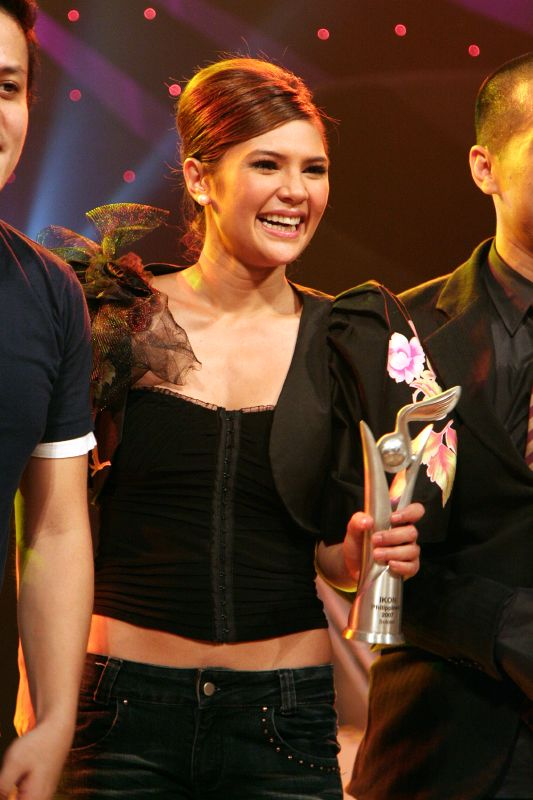
Vina Morales portrays Cordelia Nolasco-Balthazar.

=== Main cast ===
- Ejay Falcon as Julius Caesar "JC" Reyes
- Aljur Abrenica as Aristotle "Aris" Reyes / Leo Balthazar
- Elisse Joson as Grace Policarpio-Reyes
- Jessy Mendiola as Melissa "Melai" Pamintuan
- Cherry Pie Picache as Joan Reyes
- Vina Morales as Cordelia Nolasco-Balthazar
- Ariel Rivera as P/CMSgt. Eugene Reyes
- Gardo Versoza as PO1 Ulysses Balthazar / Señor De Niro

=== Supporting cast ===
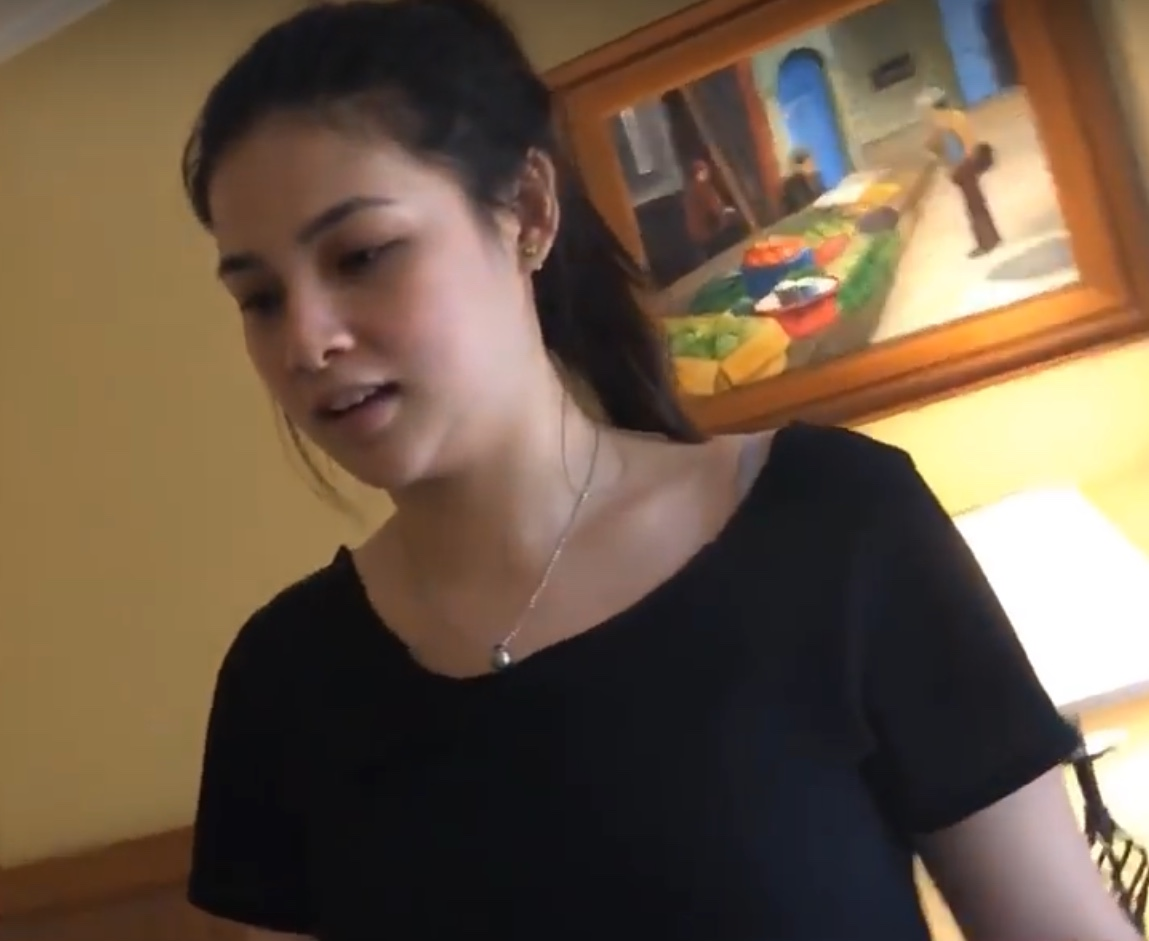
Maika Rivera portrays Inez Fajardo / Karen Guerrero.

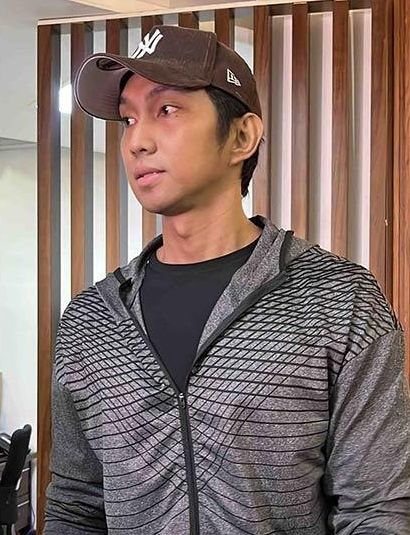
Rendon Labador portrays Joseph Romero

- Arlene Muhlach as Marilou "Lulu" Policarpio
- Ogie Diaz as Hugoberto "Hugo" Martinez
- TJ Valderrama as Tunying
- Jeric Raval as Flavio Villanueva
- Mark Lapid as Darius Guerrero
- Nanding Josef as Fr. Winston Tagle
- Dido dela Paz as Silver Angeles
- Kiko Matos as Adolfo Salazar
- Rendon Labador as Joseph Romero
- Maika Rivera as Inez Fajardo / Karen Guerrero
- Aljon Mendoza as Marco Policarpio
- Karina Bautista as Andrea "Andeng" Kalaw
- Reign Parani as Gwen Balthazar
- Ali Abinal as Napoleon "Nap" Bata
- Michael Roy Jornales as Rocco
- Cogie Domingo as Alfie
- Ali Khatibi as Marc
- Garie Concepcion as Ditas
- Manuel Chua as NBI Agent Buencamino

=== Guest cast ===
- Mike Magat as Dante
- Luke Alford as young Adolfo
- Angelica Rama as young Grace
- Zyren dela Cruz as young JC
- Marc Santiago as young Aris/Leo
- Apey Obera as Faye
- Benj Manalo as Bernardo
- Matmat Centino as Rosa
- Jan Urbano as Roman
- Chienna Filomeno as Ella
- Aurora Yumul as Baring
- Angela Tinimbang as Tarcing
- Nats Sitoy as Ofie
- William Lorenzo as Nestor

== Production ==
=== Casting ===
Aiko Melendez was originally cast for the role of Cordelia, but later backs out to focus on supporting then-Mayor Jay Khonghun's bid for Vice Governor of Zambales. Melendez was replaced by Vina Morales.

=== Finale broadcast ===
Sandugo continued through its finale week despite the enhanced community quarantine in Luzon already implemented in response to the COVID-19 pandemic in the Philippines.

Originally set to be replaced by Ang sa Iyo ay Akin, the aforementioned show's premiere was postponed due to the suspension of tapings as part of the COVID-19 restrictions. Its timeslot was later filled by reruns of Got to Believe from March 23, 2020 until the network's free-to-air closure on May 5. Instead, the aforementioned series premiered on Kapamilya Channel on the Primetime Bida evening block.

=== Timeslot block ===
This was the last series to air on the second timeslot of Kapamilya Gold prior to the Enhanced community quarantine in Luzon and the eventual ABS-CBN shutdown, in which reruns solely aired on Kapamilya Channel, following the postponement of Ang sa Iyo ay Akin due to restrictions caused by the Enhanced community quarantine in Luzon.

The timeslot would not have a fresh teleserye until Nag-aapoy na Damdamin premiered on July 25, 2023 that aired at 3:45 PM on Kapamilya Channel, TV5 and A2Z.

== Re-runs ==
The show started airing re-runs on Jeepney TV from July 26 to October 15, 2021 (replacing the re-runs of Sana Dalawa ang Puso and was replaced by the re-runs of Hawak Kamay).

It also aired on ALLTV from March 6 to July 16, 2023 (replacing the re-runs of Sana Dalawa ang Puso and was replaced by the re-runs of Precious Hearts Romances Presents: Araw Gabi).

== Ratings ==
Kantar Media National TV Ratings (4:30 PM (Luzon) / 10:30 AM (VisMin) PST)
Pilot Episode	Finale Episode	Peak	Average
18.0% September 30, 2019	N/A; March 20, 2020	N/A; N/A	TBA

== See also ==
- List of programs broadcast by ABS-CBN
- List of ABS-CBN Studios original drama series
