= Jiro Manio =

Filipino former actor

- Born: Jiro Manio; May 9, 1992 (age 34); Cainta, Rizal, Philippines
- Occupation: Actor
- Years active: 1999–2010, 2025–present
- Agent: Star Magic (1999–2009)

Jiro Manio (born May 9, 1992) is a Filipino actor. He is best known for his portrayal of the title character in the drama film Magnifico (2003), for which he won the Gawad Urian for Best Actor at age 12, making him the youngest-ever winner in that category. For that same film, he also won the PMPC Star Award for Movie Actor of the Year, FAP Award for Best Actor, and FAMAS Award for Best Child Actor—thus winning the Philippine movie grand slam. Earlier, he won the Best Child Performer award in the 2001 Metro Manila Film Festival for his role in Marilou Diaz-Abaya's Bagong Buwan (2001). He also received acting award nominations for his performances in Mila (2001) and Foster Child (2007). Manio also appeared in the comedy film Ang Tanging Ina (2003) and its sequels, the fantasy television series Spirits (2004–05), and the gay-themed comedy Manay Po (2006) and its sequel.

Starting in his late teens, Manio's personal life has been mired with controversies including drug abuse and an arrest for alleged frustrated homicide.

== Early life and education ==
Manio was born to a Filipino mother Joylene Santos Manio (died August 8, 2006) and Japanese father Yusuke Katakura (片倉 裕介). He was raised by his grandfather and had a younger brother named Anjo Santos.

Manio attended grade school at Holy Child Parochial School in San Juan, Metro Manila (now Saint John the Baptist Catholic School) and graduated from high school in 2012 through the Philippines Department of Education's (DepEd) home study program at Rizal Experimental Station and Pilot School of Cottage Industries (RESPCI) in Pasig. He planned to study Hotel and Restaurant Management (HRM) in culinary studies at the De La Salle-College of Saint Benilde in the Malate district of Manila.

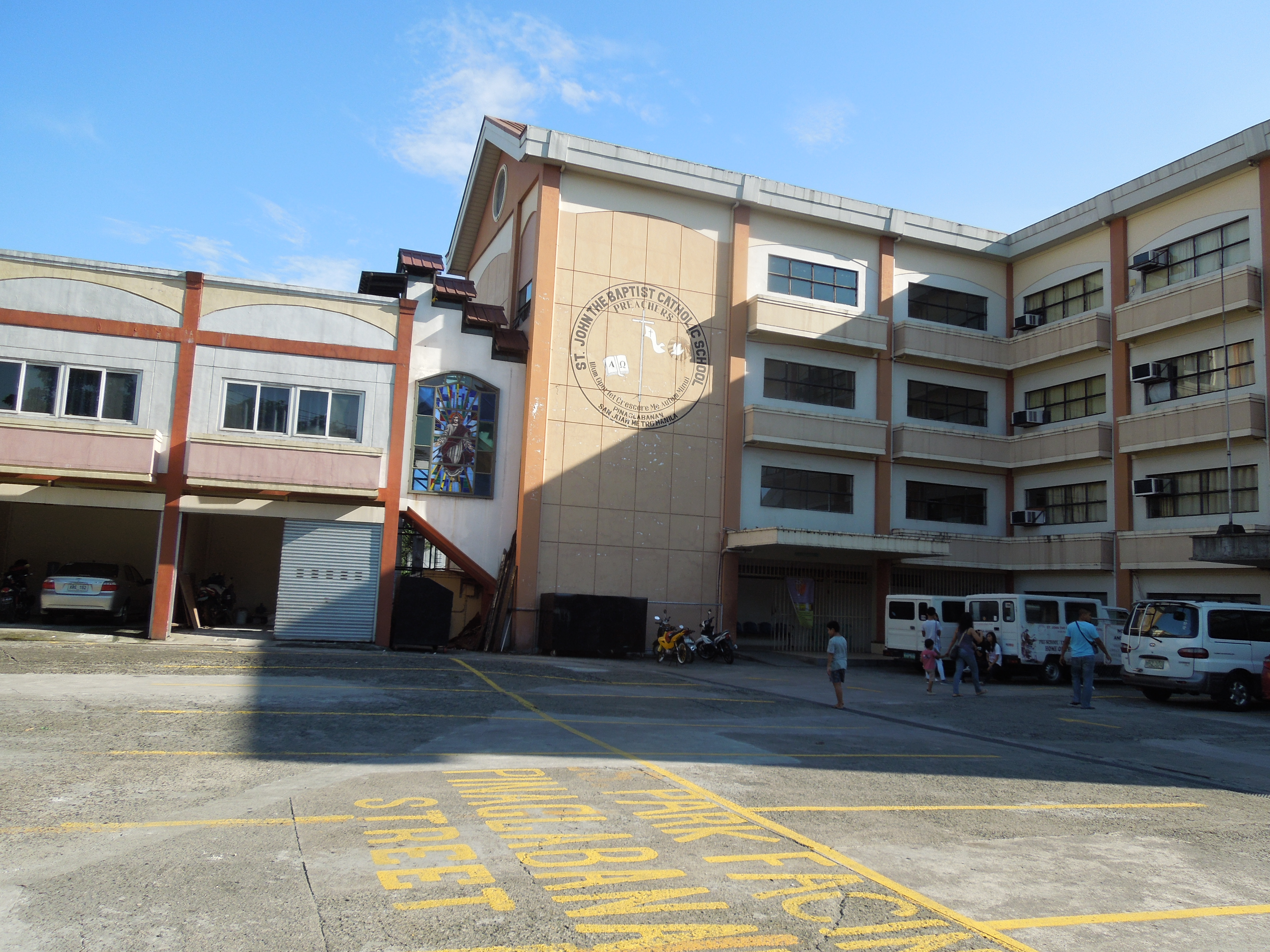
Saint John the Baptist Catholic School

== Career ==
He starred in the digital film Tambolista for Cinema One network and in Ang Tanging Ina Niyong Lahat with Ai-Ai delas Alas. In 2004, he won the Best Actor at the Gawad Urian and the Best Child Actor award at the Filipino Academy of Movie Arts and Sciences Awards (FAMAS) for the movie Magnifico.

He was a member of ABS-CBN's talent management agency Star Magic from 1999 until his termination in June 2009 due to unprofessional behavior.

In 2010, he transferred to GMA Network and appeared on that network's show Pilyang Kerubin, top billed by Barbie Forteza.

== Personal life ==
=== Substance abuse ===
Manio later became a drug addict. He fathered two daughters out of wedlock with a longtime partner.

On May 18, 2011, the news programme TV Patrol reported that Manio underwent rehabilitation treatment for drug addiction. With the encouragement of his foster father, Andrew, and his manager, Magnifico director Maryo J. delos Reyes, he committed himself to the Home Care rehabilitation center, where he underwent therapy for almost a year. After the initial phase of his rehabilitation, Home Care allowed him to finish his senior year of high school.

On June 30, 2015, Manio was spotted wandering around Ninoy Aquino International Airport (NAIA) Terminal 3. Manio, who was scavenging for food and living off the kindness of airport staff, had apparently run away and gone missing from Cainta four days before, following a supposed altercation with relatives.

On July 1, 2015, four days after wandering around NAIA, he was finally brought home by his half brother, Anjo Santos, after Manio's relative saw his picture that appeared on different social networking sites.

Comedian Ai-Ai delas Alas and other artists offered Manio their help to get his life back on the right track, but he refused it.

When he was asked by reporters if he is still open to new projects in the near future, Manio refused to continue his work as an actor.

In January 2016, Manio was released from a rehabilitation center after months of treatment but returned to in February due to his chronic health condition.

=== Frustrated homicide case ===
On the evening of January 17, 2020, Manio was arrested after allegedly stabbing a man during a fight in Marikina. The complainant, 25-year-old Zeus Doctolero, filed a police report claiming that Manio attacked him unprovoked while he was walking to a friend's house. A fistfight ensued between the two, during which Manio allegedly pulled out a kitchen knife and stabbed Doctolero at least three times until the latter managed to get hold of the knife. Doctolero was treated at the hospital for wounds sustained on his upper back and head. However, some witnesses countered Doctolero's report, claiming that Doctolero, who was allegedly drunk at the time, used a motorcycle helmet to attack Manio first, and that Manio held a spoon instead of a knife. However, police did not receive any formal reports that described Doctolero as the initiator of the fight. Manio's partner said they were planning to sue Doctolero. Manio was charged with frustrated homicide and underwent inquest proceedings the next day.

=== Selling of Gawad Urian Trophy ===
In January 2024, Manio appeared on Pinoy Pawnstars, where he offered to sell his Gawad Urian trophy to the show's host, Boss Toyo. The trophy, which he had won for his performance in Magnifico, was initially priced at ₱500,000. Boss Toyo countered with an offer of ₱50,000, and after negotiations, the two agreed on a final price of ₱75,000.

== Filmography ==
=== Film ===
Year	Title	Role
1999	Pamana	
1999	Gimik: The Reunion	Dancing Kid
2000	Anak	Jason
2001	Mila	Peklat
2001	La Vida Rosa	Enteng
2001	Bagong Buwan	Francis
2003	Magnifico	Magnifico
2003	Anghel sa Lupa	Aki
2003	Ang Tanging Ina	Shammy
2006	Manay Po	Orwell Castello
2006	Pacquiao: The Movie	Young Manny Pacquiao
2007	Foster Child	Yuri
2007	Tirador	Odie
2007	Green Paradise	Marcial
2007	Tambolista	Jason
2007	Bahay Kubo	JR
2008	Ang Lihim ni Antonio	Mike
2008	Manay Po 2: Overload	Orwell Castello
2008	Ang Tanging Ina Ninyong Lahat	Shammy
2009	Villa Estrella	Young Alex
2010	Ang Tanging Ina Mo (Last na 'To!)	Shammy

=== Television ===
Year	Title	Role
1999	Labs Ko Si Babe	Miko Escallon
2000	Pangako Sa 'Yo	Kokoy dela Merced
2000	Wansapanataym: Wish Bag	
2001	Da body en da guard	
2001	Maalaala Mo Kaya: Oto San	Ambo
2003	Basta't Kasama Kita	Hapon
2003	Ang Tanging Ina	Shammy
2004	Spirits	Nato
2005	Mga Anghel na Walang Langit	Jasper
2006	Komiks: Da Adventures of Pedro Penduko	Chris
2006	Maging Sino Ka Man	Young Pong
2006	Maalaala Mo Kaya: Manikang Papel	Dodong
2007	Love Spell: My Soulfone	
2007	Margarita	Young Rodrigo
2008	Kung Fu Kids	Young Mackuy
2008	Maalaala Mo Kaya: Basura	Mackuy
2008	I Am KC	Gang Leader
2009	Tayong Dalawa	Stanley King, Jr.
2010	Pilyang Kerubin	Rodjun San Diego
2010	Maynila	Various roles
2010	Little Star	Joross

== Awards and nominations ==
Year	Category	Award	Nominated work	Result
2008	Movie Supporting Actor of the Year	PMPC Star Awards for Movies	Foster Child	Nominated
2008	Best Supporting Actor (Pinakamahusay na Pangalawang Aktor)	Gawad Urian Award	Tambolista	Nominated
2008	Best Actor (Pinakamahusay na Pangunahing Aktor)	Gawad Urian Award	Foster Child	Nominated
2004	Best Child Actor	FAMAS Award	Magnifico	Won
2004	Best Actor	Gawad Urian Award	Magnifico	Won
2004	Best Actor	FAP Awards	Magnifico	Won
2004	Most Popular Child Actor	Guillermo Mendoza Memorial Scholarship Foundation	Magnifico	Won
2002	Best Supporting Actor	Gawad Urian Award	Magnifico	Nominated
2002	Best Child Actor	FAMAS Award	Mila	Nominated
2002	Most Popular Child Actor	Guillermo Mendoza Memorial Scholarship Foundation	Mila	Won
2001	Best Child Performer	Metro Manila Film Festival	Bagong Buwan	Won
2001	Best Child Actor	FAMAS Award	Bagong Buwan	Won
