= Paolo Villaluna =

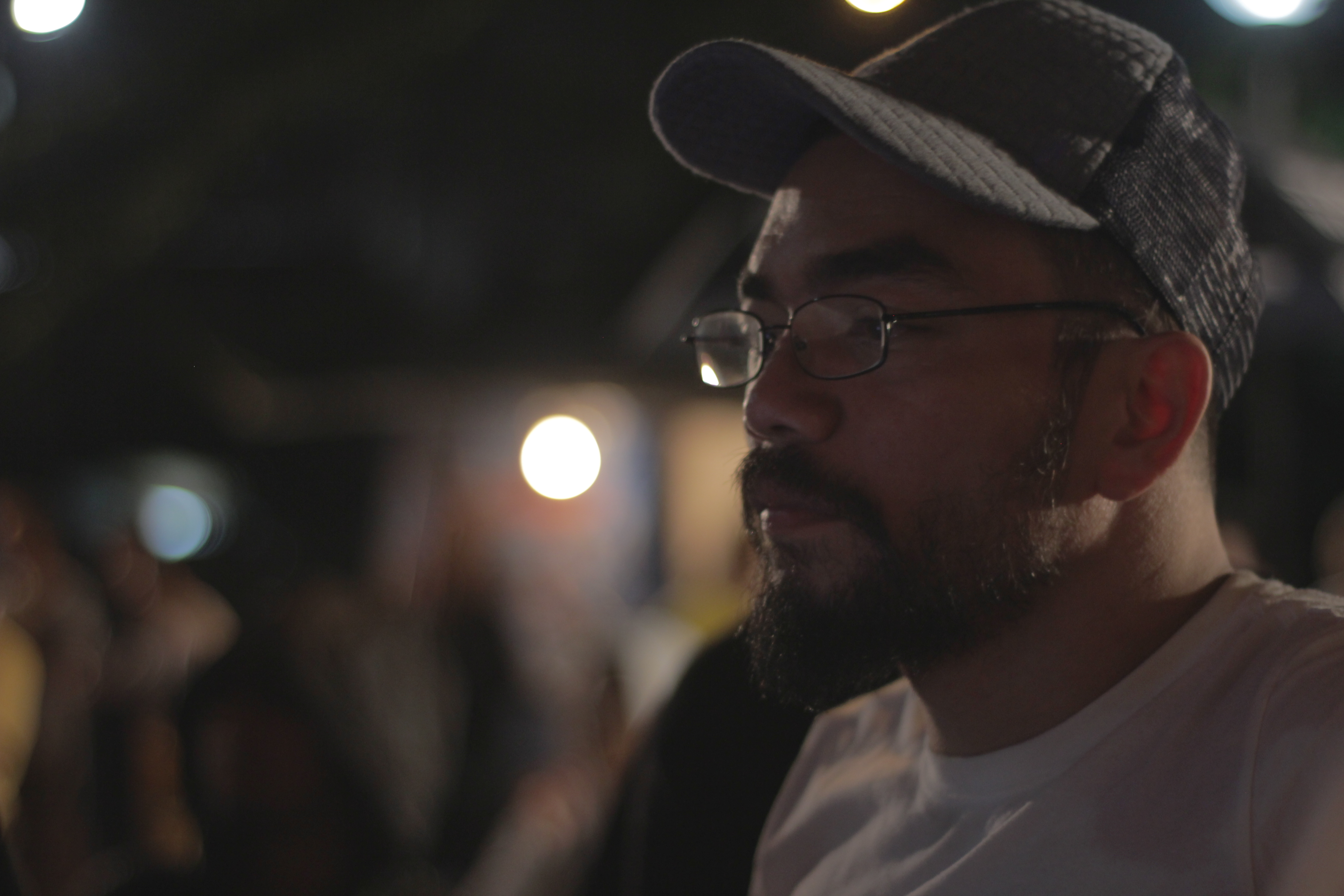
- Education: University of the Philippines Los Baños
- Occupations: Filmmaker, Film director
- Years active: 2001-present

Paolo Villaluna is a Filipino film, television and TV commercial director best known for directing the official music video for the Philippine national anthem (2024) and the films "Selda (The Inmate, 2007)", and "Pedicab (2016)". He is part of the Philippine New Wave’s "most significant, most exciting digital frontliners of the alternative movement" (Philippine New Wave, Movfest Publishings, 2010) that emerged during the mid 2000’s that helped usher a new era in local cinema.

== Career ==
=== Short films ===
Villaluna's short films have been screened in film festivals including Yamagata, Clermont-Ferrand, and Rotterdam.

His Urian-award winning short documentary, "Palugid (Margins, 2001)", is considered as an influential coming out of the closet biographical work and has been programmed in Philippine Cinema retrospectives in Germany and the Czech Republic.

=== Feature-length films ===
His first full length film, co-directed with animator Ellen Ramos, Ilusyon (Illusion, 2005) was awarded with CJ Selections at the 2006 Busan International Film Festival.

In 2007, his second film Selda (The Inmate) was the first Filipino film to be accepted in the main competition of both the Montreal World Film Festival and the Thessaloniki International Film Festival. Sid Lucero and Emilio Garcia tied as Best Actors in Thessaloniki for the film.

The "Love Trilogy" ended with 2009's Walang Hanggang Paalam (Endless Farewell) which won the Best World Showcase award in Soho International Film Festival in New York in 2010.

His fourth and latest film is 2016's Pedicab, which won the coveted Golden Goblet Award at the 20th Shanghai International Film Festival where Cannes-winner and jury head Cristian Mungiu (Romanian Director) stated, "For the humanism and universality of the story, for the simplicity of the style and realization – for the non-conformism with which it represented our desire to believe that there is a sense in this Universe, the award for the Best Film goes to PEDICAB, from the Philippines." It also won six awards in the Tofarm Film Festival including the Special Jury Prize and Best Acting for leading actors Bembol Roco and Cherry Pie Picache.

=== Television ===
In 2009, together with journalist Patricia Evangelista he made his TV directorial debut with Storyline for the ABS-CBN New Channel. His television work has garnered back-to-back Gawad Tanglaw awards, a Catholic Mass Media award and New York Film Festival medals.

=== TV commercials ===
In 2010, he began to work for advertising as an in-house director for the country's biggest TVC production supplier, Filmex and has made successful campaigns for brands like McDonald's and Jolibee.

Villaluna has written opinion pieces and directed short documentaries for Rappler.

=== Other positions ===
On August 8, 2024, Villaluna was appointed as director-general of the Film Academy of the Philippines by Cultural Center of the Philippines chair Jaime C. Laya.

== Full-feature films ==
Year	Title	Director	Producer	Writer	Editor	Notes
2016	Pauwi Na (Pedicab)	Yes		Yes	Yes	Produced by Ellen Ramos/Co-written, co-edited with Ellen Ramos
2009	Walang Hanggang Paalam (Endless Farewell)	Yes	Yes	Yes	Yes	Co-produced, co-directed, co-edited with Ellen Ramos
2007	Selda (The Inmate)	Yes	Yes	Yes	Yes	Co-produced with Leo Dominguez; Co-directed, co-written, co-edited with Ellen Ramos
2005	Ilusyon (Illusion)	Yes		Yes	Yes	Produced by Jon Red; Co-directed with Ellen Ramos; Co-written with Jon Red

== Short films ==
Year	Title	Director	Producer	Writer	Editor	Notes
2001	Palugid (Margins)	Yes		Yes		Produced by Mowelfund Film Institute; Edited by Dexter Cayanes
2004	Godspeed (animation)	Yes	Yes	Yes	Yes	Co-directed, co-produced, co-written, co-edited with Ellen Ramos
2006	One Shot (from the omnibus film Imahenasyon)	Yes		Yes	Yes	Produced by Patricia Evangelista
2007	Ramblings From the Sea (from the omnibus film Guimaras)	Yes	Yes	Yes	Yes	
2010	Wasteland (from the omnibus film Ambisyon)	Yes		Yes	Yes	Produced by Patricia Evangelista
2011	Intolerance (from the omnibus film Kinse)	Yes		Yes	Yes	Produced by Patricia Evangelista
2013	An Ordinary Day (documentary)	Yes			Yes	Produced and written by Patricia Evangelista
2013	The Gravediggers (documentary)	Yes			Yes	Produced and written by Patricia Evangelista
2013	The Children Of Sta. Barbara (documentary)	Yes			Yes	Produced and written by Patricia Evangelista
2013	Sta. Catalina (documentary)	Yes			Yes	Produced and written by Patricia Evangelista
2016	Mandaluyong (documentary)	Yes			Yes	Produced and written by Patricia Evangelista
2016	Alyas Heart (documentary)	Yes			Yes	Produced and written by Patricia Evangelista

== Awards and nominations ==
Year	Award	Category	Film	Result
2017	Shanghai International Film Festival	The Golden Goblet for Best Film	Pauwi Na (Pedicab)	Won
2017	15th Gawad Tanglaw	Presidential Jury Award	Pauwi Na (Pedicab)	Won
2017	Urian Awards	Best Director	Pauwi Na (Pedicab)	Nominated
2017	Urian Awards	Best Screenplay	Pauwi Na (Pedicab)	Nominated
2017	Urian Awards	Best Editing	Pauwi Na (Pedicab)	Nominated
2017	Urian Awards	Best Music	Pauwi Na (Pedicab)	Nominated
2017	PMPC Star Awards	Indie Movie of the Year	Pauwi Na (Pedicab)	Nominated
2017	PMPC Star Awards	Indie Movie Director of the Year	Pauwi Na (Pedicab)	Nominated
2017	PMPC Star Awards	Indie Movie Editor of the Year	Pauwi Na (Pedicab)	Nominated
2017	PMPC Star Awards	Indie Movie Musical Scorer Of The Year	Pauwi Na (Pedicab)	Nominated
2016	1st ToFarm Festival Awards	Special Jury Prize	Pauwi Na (Pedicab)	Won
2016	1st ToFarm Festival Awards	Best Director	Pauwi Na (Pedicab)	Nominated
2016	1st ToFarm Festival Awards	Best Story	Pauwi Na (Pedicab)	Won
2016	1st ToFarm Festival Awards	Best Editor	Pauwi Na (Pedicab)	Won
2015	38th Gawad Urian Awards	Best Documentary	Sta. Catalina	Nominated
2012	10th Gawad Tanglaw Awards	Best Documentary	Storyline	Won
2012	35th Gawad Urian Awards	Best Short Film	Intolerance	Nominated
2011	54th New York Festivals for International TV and Film Awards	Silver World Medal	Storyline	Won
2011	54th New York Festivals for International TV and Film Awards	Bronze World Medal	Storyline	Won
2011	9th Gawad Tanglaw Awards	Best TV Documentary	Storyline	Won
2011	4th Ani ng Dangal	Ani ng Dangal for Cinema	Walang Hanggang Paalam (Endless Farewell)	Won
2010	1st Soho International Film Festival	Best World Showcase	Walang Hanggang Paalam (Endless Farewell)	Won
2010	8th Gawad Tanglaw Awards	Best Film	Walang Hanggang Paalam (Endless Farewell)	Won
2010	8th Gawad Tanglaw Awards	Best TV Documentary	Storyline	Won
2009	Philippine Graphics Magazine	Top 10 Young Leaders	Storyline	Won
2008	32nd Montreal World Film Festival	Grand Prix des Amériquez	Selda (The Inmate)	Nominated
2008	49th Thessaloniki International Film Festival	Golden Alexander	Selda (The Inmate)	Nominated
2008	31st Gawad Urian Awards	Best Director	Selda (The Inmate)	Nominated
2008	6th Gawad Tanglaw Awards	Best Editing	Selda (The Inmate)	Won
2008	24th Star Awards for Movies	Digital Movie Director of the Year	Selda (The Inmate)	Nominated
2008	24th Star Awards for Movies	Digital Movie of the Year	Selda (The Inmate)	Nominated
2008	24th Star Awards for Movies	Digital Movie Screenplay of the Year	Selda (The Inmate)	Nominated
2008	24th Star Awards for Movies	Digital Movie Editor of the Year	Selda (The Inmate)	Nominated
2006	11th Pusan International Film Festival	CJ Selection	Ilusyon (Illusion)	Won
2006	29th Gawad Urian	Best Editing	Ilusyon (Illusion)	Nominated
2006	3rd Golden Screen Awards	Best Motion Picture	Ilusyon (Illusion)	Nominated
2006	3rd Golden Screen Awards	Best Editing	Ilusyon (Illusion)	Nominated
2006	3rd Golden Screen Awards	Best Visual Effects	Ilusyon (Illusion)	Nominated
2001	Yamagata International Film Festival 2001	Ogawa Shinsuke Prize	Palugid (Margins)	Nominated
2001	24th Gawad Urian Awards	Best Short Film	Palugid (Margins)	Won
2001	Gawad CCP	Best Short Documentary	Palugid (Margins)	Won
2001	eKsperimento International Film Festival	Audience Award	Palugid (Margins)	Won
