= Foster Child (2007 film) =

- Official movie poster
- Directed by: Brillante Mendoza
- Written by: Ralston Jover
- Produced by: Robbie Tan
- Starring: Cherry Pie Picache; Kier Segundo
- Cinematography: Odessey Flores
- Edited by: Charliebebs Goheta
- Music by: Jerrold Tarog
- Production companies: Seiko Films; Centerstage Productions
- Distributed by: Seiko Films
- Release date: September 12, 2007
- Running time: 98 minutes
- Country: Philippines
- Languages: English; Filipino

Foster Child, also known as John John, is a Filipino indie pregnancy drama film produced by Seiko Films, which stars Cherry Pie Picache as a temporary foster parent to an abandoned child. The film is directed by Brillante Mendoza.

Foster Child is Brillante Mendoza's fourth feature film, following Manoro (2006). Mendoza is the fourth Filipino director whose work was screened in the Directors' Fortnight of the Cannes film fest.

== Plot ==
Thelma (Cherry Pie Picache), together with her husband Dado (Dan Alvaro) and teenage sons Gerald (Alwyn Uytingco) and Yuri (Jiro Manio), are an urban poor family hired by a local foster care facility to provide temporary home and care to abandoned babies pending the latter's formal adoption. The inevitable separation is heart-rending for the foster family.

Thelma's foster child John-John (Kier Segismundo) is to be turned over to his adoptive American parents. Every moment with the 3-year-old John-John becomes more precious as Thelma goes through the day fulfilling her motherly duties for the last time—bathing John-John, feeding him, and bringing him to school where the boy participates in a school presentation.

== Cast ==
- Cherry Pie Picache as Thelma
- Kier Segundo as John-John
- Eugene Domingo as Bianca
- Jiro Manio as Yuri
- Alwyn Uytingco as Gerald
- Dan Alvaro as Dado

== Accolades ==
=== 28th Durban International Film Festival ===
- Best Actress: Cherry Pie Picache

=== 6th Gawad Tanglaw Awards ===
- Best Film: Seiko Films
- Best Story: Ralston Jover
- Best Actress: Cherry Pie Picache
- Best Supporting Actress: Eugene Domingo
- Best Directors: Dante Mendoza

=== 18th Annual Circle Citation (YCC) ===
- Best Film: Seiko Films
- Best Screenplay: Ralston Jover

=== 5th ENPRESS Golden Screen Awards ===
- Best Performance by an Actress in a Lead Role (Drama): Cherry Pie Picache

=== 10th Gawad Pasado Awards ===
- Pinakapasadong Pelikula: Foster Child
- Pinkapasadong Istorya: Ralston Jover
- Natatanging Bituin ng Pelikulang Pilipino sa Taong 2007: Cherry Pie Picache
- Natatanging Direktor ng Pelikulang Pilipino sa Taong 2007: Dante “Brillante” Mendoza

=== 31st Gawad Urian Awards ===
- Best Actress: Cherry Pie Picache

=== 56th FAMAS Awards ===
- Best Child Actor: Keir Segismundo

=== 2nd Gawad Genio Awards ===
- Best Film: Seiko Films
- Best Film Actress: Cherry Pie Picache
- Best Film Child Performer: Keir Segismundo
- Best Film Screenwriter: Ralston Jover
- Best Film Story: Ralston Jover
- International-Excellence Awardee: Cherry Pie Picache
- Outstanding Genio Awardee: Seiko Films

=== 17th Brisbane International Film Festival ===
- NETPAC Award
