= List of Asintado characters =

Asintado (transl. Precise) is a Philippine action political drama television series, directed by Onat Diaz, Lino S. Cayetano, and Trina N. Dayrit, which premiered on ABS-CBN's Kapamilya Gold afternoon block and worldwide on The Filipino Channel on January 15, 2018. The series stars Julia Montes as Ana Dimasalang, a paramedic who became Gael's nurse after saving him in an accident. She becomes entwined in an assassination plot arranged by the del Mundos and Ojedas upon witnessing their plan. The show features an ensemble cast consisting of Shaina Magdayao, Paulo Avelino, Aljur Abrenica, Lorna Tolentino, Agot Isidro, Nonie Buencamino, and Cherry Pie Picache.

== Cast ==
=== Main characters ===
Actor	Character	Seasons
Actor	Character	1
Julia Montes	Juliana "Ana" Dimasalang-Del Mundo / Juliana Ramirez	Main
Julia Montes	Stella Dela Torre-Guerrero	Guest
Shaina Magdayao	Samantha "Sam" Del Mundo-Guerrero / Katrina Ramirez	Main
Aljur Abrenica	Alexander "Xander" Guerrero	Main
Paulo Avelino	Gael Del Mundo / Gael Ojeda	Main

- Julia Montes portrays two roles:

as Juliana "Ana" Dimasalang-Del Mundo / Juliana Ramirez: Ana, full of dreams for her family hopes to see her sister Katrina one day. Ana works as a nursing aid for Gael after she saves him from a mining accident. They both fall in love triggering a series of tragic events that impacts Ana, her family and her dreams. She plans to destroy all who are responsible for her loss. She, Xander, Yvonne and all others form an opposition group that will expose all of Salvador Del Mundo's crimes. After the Stella identity is exposed, Ana resumes her real identity and actively works to expose Salvador. She reunites with Gael and is overjoyed to learn that Samantha is her long lost older sister Katrina. Unfortunately, Samantha does not accept her and instead blames her for all her unhappiness and disrupting her seemingly charmed life. Ana refuses to give up. After Gael's death, Ana is pregnant with his child and is protected by Hillary and Samantha until she gives birth to a son, JR. In the finale, she rescues her son at the pier after being kidnapped by both Salvador and Natasha and reunite with Samantha before she is shot and wounded by Salvador. Ana is last seen watching Xander's marriage proposal to Samantha, their wedding, and visiting Gael's grave.

as Stella Dela Torre-Guerrero: A dead ringer for Ana. She was Xander's wife, who left her family and fortune for Xander Guerrero. They lived abroad for 10 years but she died from cancer. Her parents had died a few years before her death and left her as the sole heir to the Dela Torre fortune. Stella had no relatives other than her husband Xander with the exception of one business associate of Stella's mother, an eccentric who was tasked to handle the business until Stella returned. No one informed her that Stella had died. Xander simply returned to the Philippines, leaving her fortune, which is now legally his, untouched.

- Shaina Magdayao as Samantha "Sam" Del Mundo-Guerrero / Katrina Ramirez: She is considered as the villain because of her selfish and evil deeds. After the fire that leaves her and her sister as orphans, Samantha is adopted by Hillary and Salvador del Mundo. She was in love with her childhood best friend Gael Ojeda. Samantha leaves for Switzerland to become a jewelry designer. She returns to find Gael and Ana in love and but was not ready to give him up. She witnesses Ana's kidnapping and murder and knows the crime is ordered by Gael's mother, but she keeps quiet and sees the opportunity to get Gael back. She does not know that she holds crucial evidence against her adopted father, given to her for safekeeping by her biological father before he died. She marries Gael but the marriage breaks down as she blames Ana for her marital issues. Samantha tries to kill her sister several times. Samantha suffers much loss when her daughter dies and her marriage ends. She is devastated further when she discovers her father's involvement in her daughter's attempted kidnapping of her daughter that led to the child's death. As she confronts and denounces her father, he disinherits her and tells her that he never loved her and that she was merely a concession for his wife who longed to replace their daughter who had died early. Rejected and devastated, Samantha moves in with her mother who leaves Salvador and joins Ana's camp. Samantha discovers that she is Katrina, Ana's older sister but refuses to renew their relationship. Both reconcile when both become the target of Salvador. After Gael's death, she and Hillary team up to protect Ana, who is pregnant with Gael's child, from Salvador. In the finale, she shields Ana from getting shot twice from Salvador while they protect the newborn JR. After Salvador's death, Sam survives from her gunshot wound and was surprised that she was engaged to Xander and soon they get married as she, Xander and her family are spend time at Gael's grave.
- Aljur Abrenica as Alexander "Xander" Guerrero: Xander loses his father at a young age at the hands of Senator Del Mundo's assassin. Xander wants to get justice for his father and struggles between justice and vengeance. He saves Ana and they fight the Del Mundos and Ojeda family together. He was previously married to Stella Dela Torre, Ana's doppelganger. He agrees for Ana to use his dead wife's identity and wealth to infiltrate the world of the Del Mundos. He is in love with Ana but after Gael's death while protecting Ana, he develops feelings for Samantha. After Salvador's death, he proposes to Samantha and they get married soon after.
- Paulo Avelino as Gael Del Mundo / Gael Ojeda: Gael is the son of Miranda and Samantha's ex-boyfriend. While Samantha is away in Switzerland, he meets and falls in love with Ana. The Del Mundos and Ojedas don't approve of Ana. Ana disappears after she exposes Senator Del Mundo's connection to a political killings and Gael is confused. He believes his mother's explanation that Ana is a spy planted by Senator Del Mundo's enemies. He turns to Samantha for solace and they get married when she gets pregnant. Their marriage breaks down when they lose their child to crib death, during an attempted kidnapping. When Ana returns into their lives as Stella, Gael is drawn to her, driving Samantha into intense jealousy. Gael slowly realizes the malevolence of his “Panino” and his mother's true relationship with Salvador. They finally reveal that Salvador is Gael's father. Disgusted, Gael decides to join Ana's group to expose their corruption. Gael finally reconciles his relationship with Ana after learning of her true identity. He rescues her several times from Senator Del Mundo's attempts to kill her. Gael is later shot to death by an assassin hired by Salvador and Miranda.

=== Supporting ===
Actor	Character	Seasons
Actor	Character	1
Agot Isidro	Hillary del Mundo	Supporting
Lorna Tolentino	Miranda Ojeda	Supporting
Nonie Buencamino	Salvador del Mundo	Supporting
Empress Schuck	Monalisa "Mona" Calata	Supporting
Arron Villaflor	Ramoncito "Chito" Salazar	Supporting
Louise delos Reyes	Yvonne Calata	Supporting
Julio Diaz	Jaime Melchor Gonzales / Manuel De Dios	Supporting

- Agot Isidro as Hillary del Mundo: Hillary is the wife of Salvador who loses her daughter Samantha in a fire and later adopts Katrina to replace her. Hillary is self-absorbed and clueless about the undercurrent of issues surrounding her family but will fight anyone hurting them. She is unaware of her husband’s evil nature and is sad over his cold disregard of Samantha. She does not trust Miranda and discovers that Miranda is her husband’s lover. Throughout the series, Hillary uncovers her husband's crimes including the murders of the political figures who were running for Senator against him. She retrieves the missing documents regarding Samantha's real identity as Katrina Ramirez at the orphanage and is Ana’s sibling. She leaves Salvador and joins Ana’s camp.
- Lorna Tolentino as Miranda Ojeda: Chief Strategist of Salvador del Mundo; she is ruthless and will go as far as break her son’s heart to protect Salvador’s political career. Senator del Mundo depends on her to orchestrate his every movement to the public. It is revealed that Salvador and Miranda were ex-couple during the old days. She was soon killed by Salvador by hitting her with his car due to her treachery. She is last seen on the video to expose all of Salvador's crimes and was mentioned by Salvador who became mentally insane due to hallucinations of her voice.
- Nonie Buencamino as Salvador del Mundo: Salvador is a ruthless, evil, psychopath politician who will do anything and everything for his political career. He is the mastermind of Ana's misfortune, and is not a good father to Samantha. He is also the one responsible for the murders of the political figures who were also running for Senator in other opposition groups. He finally knows Ana's real identity as Juliana Ramirez by the time he and Hillary are looking for the missing documents at the orphanage where they adopted Katrina as he calls Ana from her cellphone. He recently announced his plan to campaign for Vice President in the 2022 elections. He is also behind for ambushing his own son Gael when he and Miranda attempted to kill both Ana and Samantha. He later became the governor of San Isidro, Nueva Ecija due to the death of his son Gael. He is also the one who killed Miranda for hitting her with his car for her treachery to expose all of his crimes. All of his misdeeds will be his downfall where he and Natasha teamed up to kidnap Ana and Gael's child JR at the pier and his obsession to reunite his family by kidnapping Hillary. He and Ana had a fight after he shoots Samantha two times on her back as Ana pummels him down until Xander stops her. Before he could shoot her, Ana shoots him directly to his heart as he fell and impaled by exposed steel bars below to his death. He smiles maniacally to Ana and the others before dying from blood loss.
- Empress Schuck as Mona Calata: Gregorio’s daughter, medical doctor, part of the second generation reformists working with Xander to expose Salvador del Mundo. She was tortured by Salvador and his cronies and later shot to death.
- Arron Villaflor as Chito Salazar: Eric’s son, thespian, prosthetic specialist, the group’s IT specialist, one of the second generation reformists working to expose Salvador del Mundo. He was captured by Salvador's forces and tortured to death.
- Louise delos Reyes as Yvonne Calata: Mona’s sister and Gregorio’s daughter, teacher and Karate expert, part of Xander’s group, the second generation reformists working to expose Salvador del Mundo. She is conflicted against Ana because she is in love with Xander and blames Ana for her sister’s death.
- Julio Diaz as Jaime Melchor Gonzales / Manuel De Dios. It was revealed that Melchor killed Ana's parents, Gregorio, Eric and Senator Galvez.
- Desiree Del Valle as Natasha Ojeda-Calderon is the younger sister of Miranda who appears in the wake of Miranda and Salvador's son Gael. She also collaborates with Salvador whom she calls “Buddy” to deal against Ana and was caring to her older sister Miranda and her son Gavin. Natasha was later revealed to have a debt by an international crime syndicate led by Mr. Donovan as she left to the Philippines to avoid them and she was extremely desperate to get a large sum of money to pay her debt and her reasons to join up with Salvador and Miranda. Natasha angrily blames Ana for her sister's death until Hillary shows her video that Salvador had killed her which she emotionally blames him for killing her sister. After being rescued by Salvador's lawyer from Mr. Donovan's group, she joins up with Salvador who had escaped in prison to kidnap Ana's child JR which she succeeds in doing so. Natasha later helps Ana to stop Salvador from escaping and was soon arrested by the authorities for kidnapping and she thanked Ana for helping them.

=== Recurring ===
Actor	Character	Seasons
Actor	Character	1
Ryle Paolo Tan	Jonathan "Tantan" Dimasalang	Recurring
Chokoleit	Gaspar "Gracia" Nuevadez	Recurring
Karen Reyes	Emilita "Emmy" Gomez	Recurring
Jean Saburit	Carlotta Candelaria	Recurring
Lemuel Pelayo	Diego	Recurring
Ronnie Quizon	Jorge Gesmundo	Recurring
Jacqui Leus	Gigi	Recurring
Rolly Cruz	Mayor Ronquillo	Recurring

- Ryle Paolo Tan as Jonathan "Tantan" Dimasalang: Ana’s adopted brother. He escapes to Tarlac with his grandmother to hide from assassins out to kill their family.
- Chokoleit as Gaspar "Gracia" Nuevadez: Samantha’s gay personal assistant
- Karen Reyes as Emilita "Emmy" Gomez: Ana’s EMT colleague and best friend
- Jean Saburit as Carlotta Candelaria
- Lemuel Pelayo as Diego
- Ronnie Quizon as Jorge Gesmundo
- Jacqui Leus as Gigi
- Rolly Cruz as Mayor Ronquillo

=== Guest ===
Actor	Character	Seasons
Actor	Character	1
Christian Vasquez	Eric Salazar	Guest
Art Acuña	Gregorio Calata	Guest
Mari Kamo	Arturo Galvez	Guest
Teroy Guzman	Senator Reynoso	Guest
Bing Davao	Vice President Montemayor	Guest
Nor Domingo	Berto	Guest
Hannah Ledesma	Rowena Barrios	Guest
Cherry Pie Picache	Celeste Ramos	Special guest
Lito Pimentel	Vicente Dimasalang	Special guest
Gloria Sevilla	Purisima "Lola Puring" Dimasalang	Special guest
Giovanni Baldisseri	DMO Employer	Special guest
Myel de Leon	young Juliana Ramirez / Juliana "Ana" Dimasalang	Special guest
Jana Agoncillo	young Katrina Ramirez / Samantha Del Mundo	Special guest
Miguel Diokno	young Gael Ojeda	Special guest
Jess Mendoza	young Salvador del Mundo	Special guest
Mariella Laurel	young Miranda Ojeda	Special guest
Kazel Kinouchi	young Hillary Gonzales	Special guest
Luis Alandy	Robert Ramirez	Special guest
Tanya Garcia	Criselda Ramirez	Special guest

- Christian Vasquez as Eric Salazar: Reformed Party Movement member, computer specialist, killed by Salvador del Mundo’s men in an ambush, while trying to intercept and expose the Senator’s arm shipment. Chito Salazar’s father.
- Art Acuña as Gregorio Calata: Reformed Party Movement member, military specialist, killed by Salvador del Mundo’s men in an ambush, while trying to intercept and expose the Senator’s arm shipment. Yvonne and Mona Calata’s father.
- Mari Kamo as Arturo Galvez: Sitting Senator and Head of Reformed Party Movement. He plans to expose Salvador del Mundo’s illegal arms shipments but is killed by del Mundo’s men while trying to escape. Xander’s father.
- Teroy Guzman as Senator Reynoso: Del Mundo’s political opponent in the Senate elections. He is killed because he threatens to expose Del Mundo’s illegal activities with some solid evidence.
- Bing Davao as Vice President Montemayor: Senator del Mundo’s friend.
- Nor Domingo as Berto
- Hannah Ledesma as Rowena Barrios. A celebrity journalist and long time staunch supporter of Salvador del Mundo. She is kidnapped and held hostage along with two Korean nationals by a terrorist group. When the Senator volunteers to negotiate for their release, Rowena discovers the hostage was staged, witnesses the Senator’s collusion with the terrorists when she hears them discussing the arms sale. She realizes that the hostage negotiation is a Public Relations act to prop his image in exchange for arms and weapons sale for the terrorists. Unfortunately, del Mundo saw her witness it all, so he cold bloodedly kills her. She survives briefly but Del Mundo’s assassin kills her at the hospital, but not before Rowena divulged to Mona Calata what really happened.
- Cherry Pie Picache as Celeste Ramos: Aide to Senator Galvez and Reformed Party Movement member. After their failed attempt to expose Del Mundo, she served 16 years in a Hong Kong prison on framed up drug charges. She returns to the Philippines to resume her fight to bring him down. She mentors Xander’s group, the second generation reformists working to expose Salvador del Mundo. She was shot to death by Miranda.
- Lito Pimentel as Vicente Dimasalang: He fosters Ana and adopts her. He is killed by Miranda Ojeda’s assassin while trying to save his daughter.
- Gloria Sevilla as Purisima "Lola Puring" Dimasalang: Ana’s adopted grandmother. She escapes the assassins with her grandson Tantan when Ana sends them to Tarlac to hide.
- Giovanni Baldisseri as DMO Employer
- Myel de Leon as young Juliana Ramirez / Juliana "Ana" Dimasalang: She runs away from the orphanage to look for her older sister. She is adopted by a taxi driver, Vicente Dimasalang.
- Jana Agoncillo as young Katrina Ramirez / Samantha Del Mundo: Ana’s biological sister, born with a large birth mark on her face. Before her father dies, he hands her a book for safekeeping which contains a disk hidden beneath the hard cover. She stores this among her few belongings she brings with her from the orphanage to the del Mundos. After the fire that kills her parents, she is adopted by Hilary and Salvador del Mundo. She undergoes plastic surgery to remove the face defect. As a child and elder sister, she promises her father that she would look after her younger sibling, but her birth defect holds her back. This is why she tries to bury her past.
- Miguel Diokno as young Gael Ojeda: Miranda’s only son and Senator Salvador del Mundo’s godson. He looks up to the senator as his father figure and calls him “Paninong”, a hyphenated filipino term for “papa” and “ninong” (godfather).
- Jess Mendoza as young Salvador del Mundo
- Mariella Laurel as young Miranda Ojeda
- Kazel Kinouchi as young Hillary Gonzales
- Luis Alandy as Robert Ramirez: Biological father of Ana and Samantha. He is killed in a house fire set by del Mundo’s assassins to silence him. He has credible evidence against the Senator and hides the disk in a book cover. He hands the book to his eldest daughter Katrina before he perishes in the fire.
- Tanya Garcia as Criselda Ramirez: Biological mother of Ana and Samantha, she dies in the fire that destroys their home.
