= List of Asintado episodes =

Asintado is a 2018 Philippine drama television series, directed by Onat Diaz, Lino S. Cayetano, and Trina N. Dayrit. The series stars Julia Montes as Ana Dimasalang, a paramedic who became Gael's nurse after saving him in an accident. She becomes entwined in an assassination plot arranged by the del Mundo's and Ojeda's upon witnessing their plan. The show features an ensemble cast consisting of Shaina Magdayao, Paulo Avelino, Aljur Abrenica, Lorna Tolentino, Agot Isidro, Nonie Buencamino, and Cherry Pie Picache. The series premiered on ABS-CBN's Kapamilya Gold afternoon block and worldwide on The Filipino Channel on January 15, 2018, replacing Pusong Ligaw.

As of October 5, 2018, 187 episodes of Asintado were aired over two seasons and it was replaced by Kadenang Ginto.

== Series overview ==
Season	Episodes	Originally released	
Season	Episodes	First released	Last released
1	152	January 15, 2018	August 17, 2018
2	35	August 20, 2018	October 5, 2018

== Episodes ==
=== Season 1 (2018) ===
No. overall	No. in season	Title	Twitter hashtag	Original air date	Kantar Media Rating (nationwide)
1	1	"Panimula" (Introduction)	#AsintadoPanimula	January 15, 2018	17.7%
2	2	"Hiwalay" (Separated)	#AsintadoHiwalay	January 16, 2018	19.1%
3	3	"Unang Kita" (First Meeting)	#AsintadoUnangKita	January 17, 2018	15.5%
4	4	"Paghaharap" (Encounter)	#AsintadoPaghaharap	January 18, 2018	16.2%
5	5	"Babala" (Warning)	#AsintadoBabala	January 19, 2018	16.5%
6	6	"Halik" (Kiss)	#AsintadoHalik	January 22, 2018	16.2%
7	7	"Nasorpresa" (Surprised)	#AsintadoNasorpresa	January 23, 2018	13.7%
8	8	"Napahiya" (Humiliated)	#AsintadoNapahiya	January 24, 2018	16.0%
9	9	"Dinukot" (Kidnap)	#AsintadoKidnap	January 25, 2018	15.2%
10	10	"Pinatay" (Murdered)	#AsintadoPinatay	January 26, 2018	16.7%
11	11	"Pagbangon" (Rise Up)	#AsintadoPagbangon	January 29, 2018	17.4%
12	12	"Galit" (Anger)	#AsintadoGalit	January 30, 2018	16.7%
13	13	"Tawag" (Call)	#AsintadoTawag	January 31, 2018	17.3%
14	14	"Misyon" (Mission)	#AsintadoMisyon	February 1, 2018	16.9%
15	15	"Bulilyaso" (Failure)	#AsintadoBulilyaso	February 2, 2018	16.8%
16	16	"Katotohanan" (Truth)	#AsintadoKatotohanan	February 5, 2018	14.5%
17	17	"Gulatan" (Surprise)	#AsintadoGulatan	February 6, 2018	15.3%
18	18	"Preparasyon" (Preparation)	#AsintadoPreparasyon	February 7, 2018	14.7%
19	19	"Ang Kasal" (The Wedding)	#AsintadoKasal	February 8, 2018	16.0%
20	20	"Malikmata" (Illusion)	#AsintadoMalikmata	February 9, 2018	13.7%
21	21	"Pursigido" (Determined)	#AsintadoPursigido	February 12, 2018	15.8%
22	22	"Hanapan" (Seeking)	#AsintadoPagpapanggap	February 13, 2018	16.9%
23	23	"Natagpuan" (Found)	#AsintadoNatagpuan	February 14, 2018	14.9%
24	24	"Pagtulong" (Helping)	#AsintadoPagtulong	February 15, 2018	15.6%
25	25	"Tagumpay" (Success)	#AsintadoTagumpay	February 16, 2018	16.8%
26	26	"Maskara" (Disguise)	#AsintadoMaskara	February 19, 2018	16.8%
27	27	"Banggaan" (Collision)	#AsintadoBanggaan	February 20, 2018	14.1%
28	28	"Stella" (Stella)	#AsintadoStella	February 21, 2018	14.0%
29	29	"Pagharap" (Confrontation)	#AsintadoPagharap	February 22, 2018	15.7%
30	30	"Usisa" (Query)	#AsintadoUsisa	February 23, 2018	17.7%
31	31	"Bisita" (Guest)	#AsintadoBisita	February 26, 2018	16.7%
32	32	"Nakalusot" (Persisted)	#AsintadoNakalusot	February 27, 2018	16.4%
33	33	"Tiwala" (Trust)	#AsintadoTiwala	February 28, 2018	16.2%
34	34	"Pagguho ng Lupa" (Landslide)	#AsintadoLandslide	March 1, 2018	16.6%
35	35	"Pabida" (Heroic)	#AsintadoPabida	March 2, 2018	16.7%
36	36	"Kabakas" (Partners)	#AsintadoPartners	March 5, 2018	16.2%
37	37	"Patibong" (Trap)	#AsintadoPatibong	March 6, 2018	15.1%
38	38	"Dedma" (Ignored)	#AsintadoDedma	March 7, 2018	15.1%
39	39	"Paghimasok" (Trespass)	#AsintadoTrespass	March 8, 2018	15.0%
40	40	"Delikado" (Perilous)	#AsintadoDelikado	March 9, 2018	15.6%
41	41	"Miranda vs. Celeste" (Miranda vs. Celeste)	#AsintadoMirandaVsCeleste	March 12, 2018	16.8%
42	42	"Paalam, Ms. C" (Bye, Ms. C)	#AsintadoByeMsC	March 13, 2018	16.8%
43	43	"Awayan" (Fight)	#AsintadoAwayan	March 14, 2018	16.6%
44	44	"Palaban" (Fighter)	#AsintadoPalaban	March 15, 2018	15.6%
45	45	"Bakas ng Daliri" (Fingerprint)	#AsintadoFingerprint	March 16, 2018	14.5%
46	46	"Kumpronta" (Confront)	#AsintadoKumpronta	March 19, 2018	14.9%
47	47	"Suhol" (Bribe)	#AsintadoSuhol	March 20, 2018	16.1%
48	48	"Regalo" (Gift)	#AsintadoRegalo	March 21, 2018	15.2%
49	49	"Kape" (Coffee)	#AsintadoKape	March 22, 2018	16.2%
50	50	"Buo" (Complete)	#AsintadoBuo	March 23, 2018	16.4%
51	51	"Nabisto" (Exposed)	#AsintadoNabisto	March 26, 2018	14.3%
52	52	"Huli" (Captured)	#AsintadoHuli	March 27, 2018	15.1%
53	53	"Kumpirmado" (Confirmed)	#AsintadoKumpirmado	March 28, 2018	14.8%
54	54	"Malisya" (Malice)	#AsintadoMalisya	April 2, 2018	15.8%
55	55	"Trabaho" (Work)	#AsintadoTrabaho	April 3, 2018	15.8%
56	56	"Akit" (Seduce)	#AsintadoAkit	April 4, 2018	16.1%
57	57	"Angkas" (Riding Together)	#AsintadoAngkas	April 5, 2018	16.9%
58	58	"Alala" (Worry)	#AsintadoAlala	April 6, 2018	15.1%
59	59	"Sisante" (Fired)	#AsintadoSistante	April 9, 2018	17.0%
60	60	"Pagbabalik" (The Return)	#AsintadoPagbabalik	April 10, 2018	17.5%
61	61	"Laban" (Fight)	#AsintadoLaban	April 11, 2018	16.0%
62	62	"Testigo" (Witness)	#AsintadoTestigo	April 12, 2018	15.9%
63	63	"Operasyon" (Operation)	#AsintadoOperasyon	April 13, 2018	16.7%
64	64	"Dalaw" (Visit)	#AsintadoDalaw	April 16, 2018	15.1%
65	65	"Arestado" (Arrested)	#AsintadoArestado	April 17, 2018	15.6%
66	66	"Banta" (Threats)	#AsintadoBanta	April 18, 2018	13.9%
67	67	"Laya" (Free)	#AsintadoLaya	April 19, 2018	13.9%
68	68	"Libro" (Book)	#AsintadoLibro	April 20, 2018	15.0%
69	69	"Hanap" (Looking For)	#AsintadoHanap	April 23, 2018	14.5%
70	70	"Selos" (Jealousy)	#AsintadoSelos	April 24, 2018	15.2%
71	71	"Sulsol" (Urge)	#AsintadoSulsol	April 25, 2018	14.2%
72	72	"Apela" (Appeal)	#AsintadoApela	April 26, 2018	14.9%
73	73	"Kabit" (Mistress)	#AsintadoKabit	April 27, 2018	15.9%
74	74	"Bistado" (Exposed)	#AsintadoBistado	April 30, 2018	15.3%
75	75	"Poot" (Rage)	#AsintadoPoot	May 1, 2018	16.2%
76	76	"Dawit" (Entanglement)	#AsintadoDawit	May 2, 2018	16.3%
77	77	"Desidido" (Decided)	#AsintadoDesidido	May 3, 2018	16.0%
78	78	"Arte" (Quirk)	#AsintadoArte	May 4, 2018	13.8%
79	79	"Pagdinig" (Hearing)	#AsintadoPagdinig	May 7, 2018	14.5%
80	80	"Laro" (Game)	#AsintadoLaro	May 8, 2018	14.1%
81	81	"Bitag" (Trap)	#AsintadoBitag	May 9, 2018	14.6%
82	82	"Marka" (Gunshot Wound)	#AsintadoMarka	May 10, 2018	14.4%
83	83	"Bihag" (Captive)	#AsintadoBihag	May 11, 2018	15.5%
84	84	"Tangka" (Attempt)	#AsintadoTangka	May 14, 2018	14.0%
85	85	"Lantad" (Reveal)	#AsintadoLantad	May 15, 2018	14.5%
86	86	"Lagas" (Falling Off)	#AsintadoLagas	May 16, 2018	15.5%
87	87	"Harapan" (Face to Face)	#AsintadoHarapan	May 17, 2018	15.8%
88	88	"Pagkatao" (True Origins)	#AsintadoPagkatao	May 18, 2018	14.9%
89	89	"Ungkat" (Reveal)	#AsintadoUngkat	May 21, 2018	15.1%
90	90	"Ganti" (Retribution)	#AsintadoGanti	May 22, 2018	15.4%
91	91	"Kakampi" (Ally)	#AsintadoKakampi	May 23, 2018	15.9%
92	92	"Manumbalik" (Restored Love)	#AsintadoManumbalik	May 24, 2018	17.0%
93	93	"Nadarang" (Enamored)	#AsintadoNadarang	May 25, 2018	17.5%
94	94	"Anak" (Child)	#AsintadoAnak	May 28, 2018	16.3%
95	95	"Ahas" (Snake)	#AsintadoAhas	May 29, 2018	17.1%
96	96	"Baliw" (Psycho)	#AsintadoBaliw	May 30, 2018	17.2%
97	97	"Puslit" (Sneak)	#AsintadoPuslit	May 31, 2018	17.5%
98	98	"Takas" (Escape)	#AsintadoTakas	June 1, 2018	16.8%
99	99	"Sunog" (Fire)	#AsintadoSunog	June 4, 2018	15.3%
100	100	"Akusasyon" (Accusation)	#AsintadoAkusasyon	June 5, 2018	16.0%
101	101	"Kaso" (Case)	#AsintadoKaso	June 6, 2018	17.6%
102	102	"Kulong" (Imprisoned)	#AsintadoKulong	June 7, 2018	15.7%
103	103	"Atake" (Attack)	#AsintadoAtake	June 8, 2018	15.0%
104	104	"Hampasan"	#AsintadoHampasan	June 11, 2018	16.7%
105	105	"Binyagan" (Baptism)	#AsintadoBinyagan	June 12, 2018	17.2%
106	106	"Bangayan" (Strife)	#AsintadoBangayan	June 13, 2018	17.0%
107	107	"Iyakan" (Cry)	#AsintadoIyakan	June 14, 2018	17.8%
108	108	"Gantihan" (Revenge)	#AsintadoGantihan	June 15, 2018	17.0%
109	109	"Planta" (Plant)	#AsintadoPlanta	June 18, 2018	15.4%
110	110	"Konsensya" (Conscience)	#AsintadoKonsensya	June 19, 2018	16.1%
111	111	"Annulment"	#AsintadoAnnulment	June 20, 2018	15.8%
112	112	"Pahirapan" (Torture)	#AsintadoPahirapan	June 21, 2018	14.3%
113	113	"Aamin" (Admit)	#AsintadoAamin	June 22, 2018	15.9%
114	114	"Nasaktan" (Hurt)	#AsintadoNasaktan	June 25, 2018	17.1%
115	115	"Tutol" (Oppose)	#AsintadoTutol	June 26, 2018	16.3%
116	116	"Sumbong" (Complaint)	#AsintadoSumbong	June 27, 2018	14.8%
117	117	"Paghahanap" (Search)	#AsintadoPaghahanap	June 28, 2018	15.5%
118	118	"Tulungan" (Help)	#AsintadoTulungan	June 29, 2018	16.5%
119	119	"Impormasyon" (Information)	#AsintadoImpormasyon	July 2, 2018	15.6%
120	120	"Sabwatan" (Connivance)	#AsintadoSabwatan	July 3, 2018	14.8%
121	121	"Traydor" (Traitor)	#AsintadoTraydor	July 4, 2018	17.4%
122	122	"Pasabog" (Revelation)	#AsintadoPasabog	July 5, 2018	18.4%
123	123	"Magkapatid" (Sibling)	#AsintadoMagkapatid	July 6, 2018	16.7%
124	124	"Magpatawad" (Forgiveness)	#AsintadoMagpatawad	July 9, 2018	16.7%
125	125	"Bumawi" (Get Back)	#AsintadoBumawi	July 10, 2018	17.0%
126	126	"Lumuhod" (Kneel)	#AsintadoLumuhod	July 11, 2018	15.3%
127	127	"Iringan"	#AsintadoIringan	July 12, 2018	15.8%
128	128	"Magbigay" (Give)	#AsintadoMagbigay	July 13, 2018	16.2%
129	129	"Ama" (Father)	#AsintadoAma	July 16, 2018	15.5%
130	130	"Mawawala" (Missing)	#AsintadoMawawala	July 17, 2018	15.5%
131	131	"Resbak" (Return)	#AsintadoResbak	July 18, 2018	15.4%
132	132	"Magtutuos"	#AsintadoMagtutuos	July 19, 2018	14.4%
133	133	"Sanib Pwersa" (Join Forces)	#AsintadoSanibPwersa	July 20, 2018	16.3%
134	134	"Nagkasundo"	#AsintadoNagkasundo	July 24, 2018 (Note: Episode 134 did not air on July 23 due to SONA State of the Nation Address news coverage.)	15.5%
135	135	"Unahan" (Fore)	#AsintadoUnahan	July 25, 2018	16.0%
136	136	"Prangkahan"	#AsintadoPrangkahan	July 26, 2018	16.6%
137	137	"Peligro" (Risk)	#AsintadoPeligro	July 27, 2018	15.4%
138	138	"Tampo"	#AsintadoTampo	July 30, 2018	15.8%
139	139	"Ate" (Sister)	#AsintadoAte	July 31, 2018	14.7%
140	140	"Solusyon" (Solution)	#AsintadoSolusyon	August 1, 2018	14.9%
141	141	"Pagkakataon" (Opportunity)	#AsintadoPagkakataon	August 2, 2018	15.7%
142	142	"Ididiin" (Emphasis)	#AsintadoIdidiin	August 3, 2018	15.5%
143	143	"Magkasama" (Together)	#AsintadoMagkasama	August 6, 2018	15.4%
144	144	"Selebrasyon" (Celebration)	#AsintadoSelebrasyon	August 7, 2018	15.5%
145	145	"Hadlang" (Barriers)	#AsintadoHadlang	August 8, 2018	15.7%
146	146	"Kasiyahan" (Pleasure)	#AsintadoKasiyahan	August 9, 2018	18.1%
147	147	"Natauhan"	#AsintadoNatauhan	August 10, 2018	18.0%
148	148	"Karamay"	#AsintadoKaramay	August 13, 2018	16.5%
149	149	"Tapatan"	#AsintadoTapatan	August 14, 2018	15.5%
150	150	"Panganib" (Risk)	#AsintadoPanganib	August 15, 2018	16.9%
151	151	"Dalamhati" (Anguish)	#AsintadoDalamhati	August 16, 2018	18.6%
152	152	"Burol"	#AsintadoBurol	August 17, 2018	17.5%

=== Season 2 (2018) ===
No. overall	No. in season	Title	Twitter hashtag	Original air date	Kantar Media Rating (nationwide)
153	1	"Karapatan" (Right)	#AsintadoKarapatan	August 20, 2018	16.5%
154	2	"Sisihan"	#AsintadoSisihan	August 21, 2018	17.3%
155	3	"Motibo" (Motive)	#AsintadoMotibo	August 22, 2018	16.3%
156	4	"Hatian"	#AsintadoHatian	August 23, 2018	16.7%
157	5	"Ina" (Mother)	#AsintadoIna	August 24, 2018	16.5%
158	6	"Kampanya" (Campaign)	#AsintadoKampanya	August 27, 2018	16.8%
159	7	"Kumbinsi" (Convinced)	#AsintadoKumbinsi	August 28, 2018	14.7%
160	8	"Endorso" (Endorse)	#AsintadoEndorso	August 29, 2018	15.3%
161	9	"Higanti" (Revenge)	#AsintadoHiganti	August 30, 2018	14.8%
162	10	"Resulta" (Result)	#AsintadoResulta	August 31, 2018	15.2%
163	11	"Salungat" (Contrary)	#AsintadoSalungat	September 3, 2018	14.8%
164	12	"Nakatakas" (Escaped)	#AsintadoNakatakas	September 4, 2018	15.7%
165	13	"Inamin" (Admitted)	#AsintadoInamin	September 5, 2018	16.8%
166	14	"Ingatan" (Take Care)	#AsintadoIngatan	September 6, 2018	15.5%
167	15	"Paraan" (Method)	#AsintadoParaan	September 7, 2018	17.3%
168	16	"Hiling" (Request)	#AsintadoHiling	September 10, 2018	16.8%
169	17	"Niloko"	#AsintadoNiloko	September 11, 2018	17.2%
170	18	"Pakiusap" (Please)	#AsintadoPakiusap	September 12, 2018	17.2%
171	19	"Sagip" (Salvage)	#AsintadoSagip	September 13, 2018	17.8%
172	20	"Paikutin" (Rotate)	#AsintadoPaikutin	September 14, 2018	18.1%
173	21	"Lalantad" (Expose)	#AsintadoLalantad	September 17, 2018	15.6%
174	22	"Sukdulan" (Utmost)	#AsintadoSukdulan	September 18, 2018	17.1%
175	23	"Ebidensya" (Evidence)	#AsintadoEbidensya	September 19, 2018	17.3%
176	24	"Damputin" (Pick Up)	#AsintadoDamputin	September 20, 2018	17.2%
177	25	"Tulong" (Help)	#AsintadoTulong	September 21, 2018	17.0%
178	26	"Kabayaran" (Compensation)	#AsintadoKabayaran	September 24, 2018	17.6%
179	27	"Kasunduan" (Agreement)	#AsintadoKasunduan	September 25, 2018	17.4%
180	28	"Planado" (On Purpose)	#AsintadoPlanado	September 26, 2018	16.7%
181	29	"Linlang" (Wile)	#AsintadoLinlang	September 27, 2018	16.3%
182	30	"Hatol" (Judgement)	#AsintadoHatol	September 28, 2018	17.0%
183	31	"Bantay" (Guard)	#AsintadoBantay	October 1, 2018	15.6%
184	32	"Pagsilang" (Birth)	#AsintadoPagsilang	October 2, 2018	16.3%
185	33	"Dinukot" (Abducted)	#AsintadoDinukot	October 3, 2018	15.2%
186	34	"Kapalit" (Replacement)	#AsintadoKapalit	October 4, 2018	17.8%
187	35	"Huling Bala" (Last Bullet)	#AsintadoHulingBala	October 5, 2018	19.9%
