= Magdayao =

Magdayao may refer to:

- Shaina Magdayao (born 1989), Filipino actress
- Sharon Magdayao, birth name of Vina Morales (born 1975), Filipino actress and singer
