= Asintado season 1 =

Asintado
- Season 1
- Starring: Julia Montes; Shaina Magdayao; Paulo Avelino; Aljur Abrenica
- No. of episodes: 152

Release
- Original network: ABS-CBN
- Original release: January 15 – August 17, 2018

Season chronology
- Next → Season 2

The first season of the Philippine television drama series Asintado premiered on January 15, 2018, on ABS-CBN. Directed by Onat Diaz, Lino S. Cayetano, Jojo A. Saguin, Trina N. Dayrit, Jerome C. Pobocan, and Jon S. Villarin, the series stars Julia Montes as Ana Dimasalang, a paramedic who became Gael's nurse after saving him in an accident. She becomes entwined in an assassination plot arranged by the del Mundos and Ojedas upon witnessing their plan. The show features an ensemble cast consisting of Shaina Magdayao, Paulo Avelino, Aljur Abrenica, Lorna Tolentino, Agot Isidro, Nonie Buencamino, and Cherry Pie Picache.

== Plot ==
The fictional series begins in 1999 when two children, sisters Juliana (Julia Montes) and Katrina Ramirez (Shaina Magdayao), who are separated after a tragic fire that kills their parents. Before her father perishes, he entrusts a book to Katrina but does not tell her that it contains crucial evidence that explains his death. The siblings become orphans and Katrina blames Juliana for their parents' death. Following the tragedy, Juliana is adopted by the hardworking and loving Dimasalang family and changes her name to Ana Dimasalang, while Katrina is adopted by the wealthy and powerful Del Mundo family and changes her name to Samantha Del Mundo.

It is 2015 and Ana Dimasalang is an EMT while Samantha del Mundo is a successful jeweler. The two siblings meet again but are not aware that they are related. Ana is in love with Gael Ojeda (Paulo Avelino), a successful lawyer and budding politician, who is also Samantha's childhood best friend and ex-boyfriend. His mother is Miranda Ojeda (Lorna Tolentino), Senator Del Mundo's Political Strategist and Gael's godfather. The del Mundo and Ojeda family are very close and do not approve of Ana, not only because of the difference in their socio economic background but because they have plans for Samantha and Gael to reunite and build a political dynasty. Samantha is still in love with Gael and wants him back but Gael is deeply in love with Ana and is ready to give up everything just to be with Ana.

One day, Ana accidentally eavesdrops on the Senator and Miranda Ojeda discussing the need to silence Senator Reinoso, a political enemy. Confused at first, Ana becomes concerned when Senator Reinoso turns up dead. She tells Gael but he does not believe her so she reports it to the authorities, and the story turns into a media circus. The story is headlined all over the news by overzealous media, compromising Ana's security and her ability to tell Gael about Senator del Mundo's dictaphone containing the audio recording of Miranda and the Senator's conversation. Miranda orders their assassin to retrieve the missing dictaphone and kill Ana.

Coincidentally, Samantha overhears Miranda ordering someone to “get rid of Ana”. Curious and unsure of what she hears, she follows Ana home and is horrified when she witnesses Vicente and Ana Dimasalang's kidnapping and subsequent murders. Disturbed by what she sees, Samantha keeps her silence.

As it turns out, Samantha is not the only witness the crime. After Ana's news interview, some Reformists decide to follow Ana. Xander and Celeste arrive at the warehouse just as Ana and Vicente's bodies are stuffed in cement containers for disposal. While they are unable to save Vicente, they are able to retrieve Ana and she survives.

Gael tries to make sense of Ana's motives but she and her family disappears. Devastated, he believes his mother's explanation that Ana is a spy paid by Reinoso to infiltrate his godfather's office to conduct a smear campaign against him. Heartbroken, Gael turns to his best friend Samantha for solace and they resume their relationship.

Six months after her disappearance, Ana wakes up from a coma in a house occupied by the children of Reformist Informers, all victims of Senator del Mundo. Ana learns their parents, including Ana's father, worked with the movement to expose the Senator's corruption. Her father perished while attempting to turnover a disk containing crucial evidence against Del Mundo to Celeste and the group. It is this disk that is in Samantha's possession, though she is not aware of it,

In the meantime, the Senator gets involved in a hostage negotiation that turns him into a hero. Rowena Barrios, a celebrity journalist and long time staunch supporter of Salvador del Mundo is kidnapped and held hostage along with two Korean nationals by a terrorist group. When the Senator volunteers to negotiate for their release, Rowena discovers the hostage is staged and that the senator's negotiation is a public relations act to boost his image in exchange for arms and weapons sale to the terrorists. The Senator cold bloodedly shoots her, blaming her murder on the terrorists. Despite the young journalists death, the dramatic release of the Korean hostages boosts Senator del Mundo's popularity, His constituents clamor for his re-election.

Gael wants to redeem himself with the Senator who blames him for introducing Ana into their lives, so he accepts the Senator's offer to join him as the logistics operations front for the syndicate. Samantha, on the other hand, refuses to lose sight on her husband, albeit newly married and pregnant, joins their core team. Totally unprepared for her father's approval, she revels in the joy of his attention. Nevertheless, the specter of Ana haunts Samantha, and reminders of her permeates into their relationship, she becomes obsessed and determined to eliminate Ana from their lives.

To exact her revenge, Ana enters Hillary Del Mundo's world under a different identity as Stella Guerrero, Xander's patrician wife who had died abroad, away from public knowledge a few years ago. Ana is a dead ringer for Stella, the sole heiress of the De la Torre Group, Asia's leading provider of hospitals and medical equipment. Using the Candelaria Mobile Medical Clinics, one of her family's subsidiaries, Ana partners with Hilary's mining company to provide mobile clinics to remote locations in San Isidro, a mining community persistently plagued with health issues. Their partnership couldn't have occurred at a better time, their mobile units demonstrate their worth with their quick response when a landslide occurred at the mines. This allows her group close access to the mines where they suspect the logistics for the arms and weapons are executed.

As sole heiress of the De la Torre wealth, and with no other surviving relative or associates to say otherwise, Xander and Ana pull off the pretense, convincing the Del Mundos and de la Torre's remaining business partner that Ana is Stella. Except Gael who believes she is really Ana Dimasalang and he is determined to unmask her.

Their deception fails and despite the conflict that ensues as Ana's team comes close to bringing down Senator del Mundo, Ana and Gael rekindle their relationship causing a major shift in the dynamics within Ana's world and Gael's. Later, Samantha and Gael divorce, their child dies, and the scandal surrounding Senator del Mundo surfaces, nearly bringing him behind bars. Hillary discovers her husband's true evil nature and decides to leave him. She joins Ana's team. Samantha also leaves her father, he disowns her and everyone discovers she is Ana's lost sibling. Although conflicted at first, Samantha comes around and supports her sister and her relationship with her former husband.

Frustrated because Gael is determined to help Ana and remain by her side, Salvador and Miranda's nefarious hands are stayed, unable to proceed with their political ambitions. We learn by this time Gael is Salvador's natural child.

The conflict comes to a head when Gael is killed in an ambush ordered by Salvador, but meant for the two sisters. Without Gael to protect her, Ana and Samantha are vulnerable against the might of the del Mundo resources and machinery.

== Cast and characters ==
=== Protagonist ===
- Julia Montes as Juliana "Ana" Dimasalang-Del Mundo / Juliana Ramirez and Stella Dela Torre-Guerrero

=== Main ===
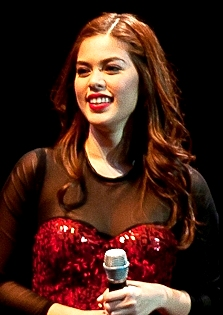
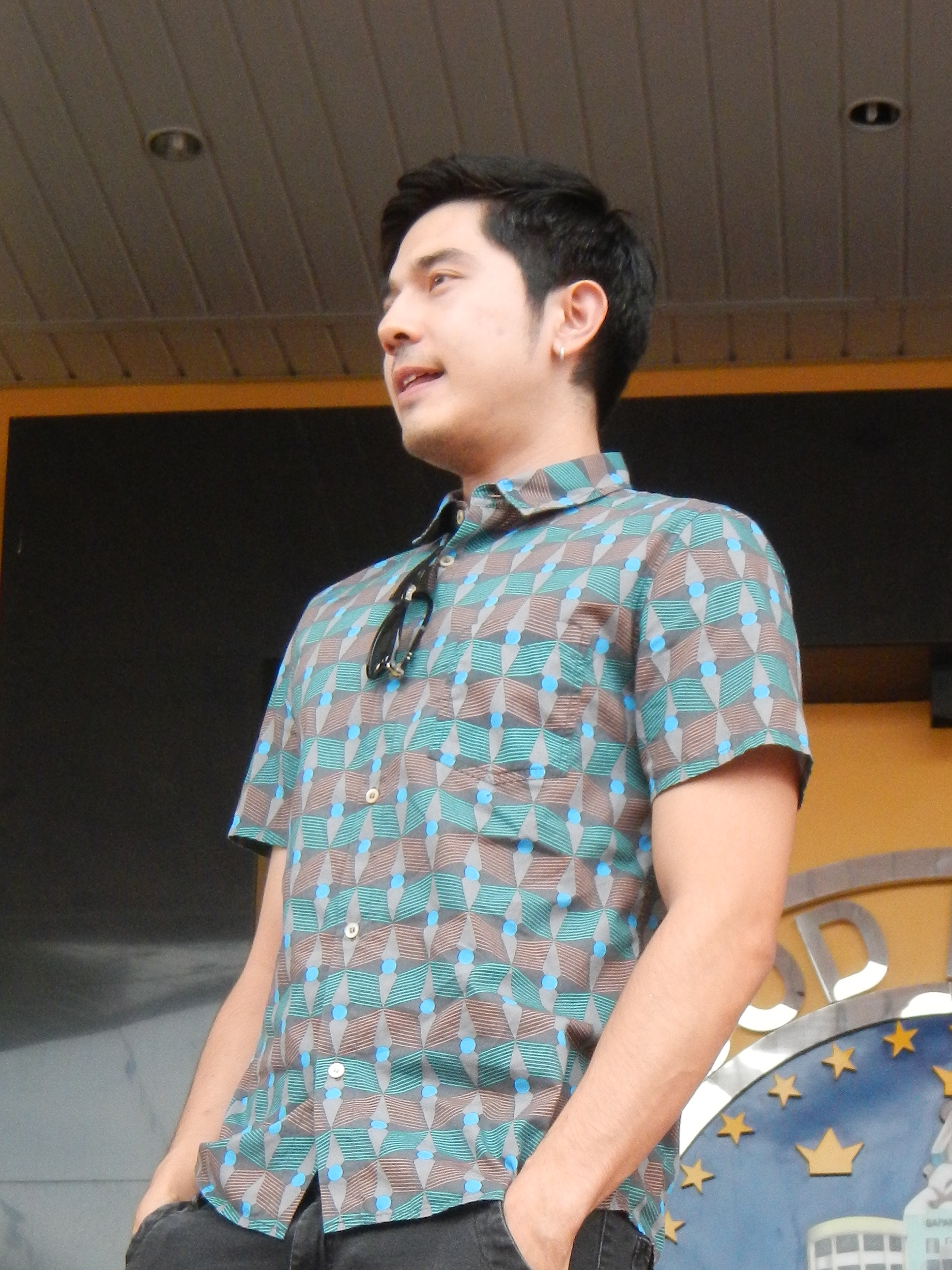
Shaina Magdayao, and Paulo Avelino (left to right) portray lead roles Samantha Del Mundo / Katrina Ramirez and Gael Ojeda.
- Shaina Magdayao as Samantha "Sam" Del Mundo / Katrina Ramirez
- Paulo Avelino as Gael Ojeda / Gael Del Mundo
- Aljur Abrenica as Alexander "Xander" Guerrero

Starring

- Lorna Tolentino as Miranda Ojeda
- Cherry Pie Picache as Celeste "Ms. C." Ramos
- Agot Isidro as Hillary Gonzales-Del Mundo
- Nonie Buencamino as Salvador Del Mundo

=== Supporting ===
- Empress Schuck as Dr. Monalisa "Mona" Calata
- Arron Villaflor as Ramoncito "Chito" Salazar
- Louise delos Reyes as Yvonne Calata
- Julio Diaz as Jaime Melchor "Tatay M" Gonzales / Manuel De Dios
- Karen Reyes as Emilita "Emmy" Gomez
- Ryle Paolo Tan as Jonathan "Tantan" Dimasalang
- Chokoleit as Gaspar "Gracia" Nuevadez
- Jean Saburit as Carlotta Candelaria
- Lemuel Pelayo as Diego Gabriel
- Ronnie Quizon as Jorge
- Jacqui Leus as Gigi
- Rolly Cruz as Mayor Ronquillo

Special Participation

- Gloria Sevilla as Purisima "Puring" Dimasalang

=== Guest ===
- Christian Vasquez as Eric Salazar
- Art Acuña as Major Gregorio Calata
- Mari Kaimo as Senator Arturo Galvez
- Teroy Guzman as Senator Reynoso
- Bing Davao as Vice President Montemayor
- Nor Domingo as Berto
- Hannah Ledesma as Rowena Barrios
- Giovanni Baldisseri as DMO Employer

=== Special guest ===
- Myel De Leon as young Juliana Ramirez / Juliana "Ana" Dimasalang
- Jana Agoncillo as young Katrina Ramirez / Samantha "Sam" Del Mundo
- Miguel Diokno as young Gael Ojeda / Gael O. Del Mundo
- Luis Alandy as Robert Ramirez
- Tanya Garcia as Criselda Ramirez
- Lito Pimentel as Vicente Dimasalang
- Mariella Laurel as young Miranda Ojeda
- Kazel Kinouchi as young Hillary Gonzales-Del Mundo
- Jess Mendoza as young Salvador Del Mundo
