= Hiling =

1998 fantasy film by Jose Javier Reyes

- Theatrical release poster
- Directed by: José Javier Reyes
- Written by: José Javier Reyes
- Produced by: Charo Santos-Concio; Malou Santos
- Starring: Camille Prats; Shaina Magdayao; Serena Dalrymple
- Cinematography: Eduardo Jacinto
- Edited by: Kelly Cruz
- Music by: Jaime Fabregas
- Production companies: Star Cinema; Available Light Productions
- Distributed by: Star Cinema
- Release date: November 18, 1998
- Country: Philippines
- Language: Filipino

Hiling (lit. 'Wish') is a 1998 Filipino fantasy comedy-drama film written and directed by Jose Javier Reyes. It stars Camille Prats, Shaina Magdayao, Serena Dalrymple, Gina Pareño, Nida Blanca, Tirso Cruz III, Cherry Pie Picache, Paolo Contis, and Carlo Aquino, with the supporting cast includes Dexter Doria, Rez Cortez, Mely Tagasa, Menggie Cobarrubias, and Joy Viado.

Produced and distributed by Star Cinema, in association with Available Light Productions, the film was theatrically released on November 18, 1998.

== Premise ==
The film revolves around the character of Anna (played by Camille Prats), an ordinary girl who on her mother's birthday was given a magical power by Manang Garcia (played by Gina Pareño), a mysterious stranger. Anna eventually discovers that she has the power to grant any wishes to other people by merely touching them with her palm. Her power would eventually change the lives of all the people around her including herself.

== Plot ==
In Barangay Sansinukuban, there's a chaotic neighborhood along Kalye Matiyaga. There lives a girl named Anna, a simple girl living with her mother Cely, and grandmother Melyang. Her estranged father Oscar lives with his sister Pura along with her older brother Junjun. She is always in the streets with her friends Trinket, the youngest daughter of Joy, and Minggoy who always fight, and Abigail, who lives with her elder brother Rolly and grandfather Sotero. Her neighbors like Elwood, who is a hopeless romantic and is head over heels for April, the daughter of Kikoy, who is also the village chief of Sansinukuban. On the day of Cely's birthday, Anna was about to bring a cake for her father and brother. But, she saw an old lady who hadn't had either breakfast or lunch. She gave a piece of cake intended for her father. Because of Anna's generosity, the old lady gave her the power to grant wishes to people by the touch of her hand. The first person that Anna touches is her auntie Pura, who wishes that her plants grow big. Trinket's household was surprised when people from an electric company disconnected their electricity. The entire neighborhood witnessed it and ridiculed and laughed at Joy because of what happened.

One morning, Pura lashed out because of her plants. But, later it grew into big sizes that made the neighborhood more astonished. They attempted to cut the plants, but to no avail. Minggoy, who wished for him to become rich so that his would no longer suffer, won a jackpot prize in the lottery after Anna touched him. While Arnel, who wished to become a woman, was transformed into a beautiful woman after Anna accidentally touched him. To prove Anna's ability, Trinket challenged her when she gets a young boy playing in an improvised swimming pool in a vacant lot. Anna touched the boy when she asked him if he wanted to have a bigger swimming pool, which the boy agreed.

== Cast and characters ==
- Camille Prats as Anna, who has the ability to grant unrestricted wishes to others. When someone wishes for something and she touches them afterward, the wish becomes real. An alternate outcome of the wish's result comes when the wisher gains abilities too indicating that she could also grant people's deepest desires manifesting as powers.
- Shaina Magdayao as Abigail, a close friend of Anna and Trinket, and the sister of Rolly
- Serena Dalrymple as Trinket, a close friend of Anna and Abigail
- Gina Pareño as Manang Gracia, who has the ability to bestow powers to others and as such was the one who gave Anna the power of unrestricted wishes via touch and Power Bestowal.
- Nida Blanca as Lola Melyang, grandmother of Anna who at first was hesitant to believe her granddaughter's powers but after seeing all the miracles Anna has done, she changed her mind.
- Tirso Cruz III as Oscar, the father of Anna who is so concerned about the child's safety that he wants to hide her child in a place where no one knows them.
- Cherry Pie Picache as Cely, the mother of Anna who loves her so much and is willing to protect her from everything no matter what.
- Paolo Contis as Elwood, Anna's hopeless romantic neighbor who wishes to become very attractive and/or a chick magnet and wants the ladies in their town to aggressively want him and love him like literally follow him wherever he goes. When Anna touches him, the wish comes true but the bad side effect of it is that the girls are willing to kill each other just for his yes. The only one immune to his love pheromone is Rowena who is a close friend of his prompting an interest in her.
- Carlo Aquino as Rolly, a close and supportive friend of Elwood, and the brother of Abigail

=== Supporting roles ===
- Rez Cortez as Mario, husband of Margie
- Dexter Doria as Margarita, who wished that her husband should become more attached to her and would serve her all the time like a queen, that she would be only beautiful in her husband's eyes. It did come true when Anna touched her afterward saying the wish, the bad side effect is that her husband "exaggerated" everything she wished to the point of giving up his job just for her.
- Mely Tagasa as Pura, who wished that only her flowers grew a lot bigger and taller and that whenever she talks to them or pours on some water to them, it will grow. Anna touched her and said "Don't worry Aunt Pura, it will happen", just a few days later when she talked and poured water on her plants, the plants grew bigger and taller. But the bad side effect of it is that the plants become deadly flower vines constricting anyone who's in contact with it except Pura herself who's the only one that calms the plants down. A possible result of her gaining the ability of Plant Communication and Plant Growth.
- Ogie Diaz as Arnell, who wishes to become a beautiful, sexy, and lovely woman and yells excitingly "I wanna be a mother!" that shocks Anna who accidentally touched her on her legs. Later that day, she eventually becomes a lady and calls herself as "Annabel". The bad side effect of her wish is that she becomes an instant pregnant lady the same day at night. Ahrnell now Annabel seeing her tummy instantly growing rapidly called for help as it seems like she's going to bore a child soon.
- Via Veloso as Annabel, the lady that Ahrnell has become.
- Menggie Cobarrubias as Atty. Minggoy, the father of Trinket who wishes that if only they were rich then all of their problems would be solved. After saying the wish, Anna touched him with comfort and the lotto ticket he bought did get the overwhelming jackpot prize, making them the richest in their town. But because of their instant luck, they become greedy, boastful, and selfish to the point of wanting to have more.
- Joy Viado as Joy Contreras, the mother of Trinket whom as a result of her greediness, planned to kill Lolo Sotero for them to be able to own all the land area of their town in which Lolo Sotero refuses to sell to them.
- Koko Trinidad as Lolo Sotero, who almost got killed thanks to the help from Anna, Trinket, Abigail, and their friends it was avoided.
- Arlene Tolibas as Precy, a resident in Anna's town and Arnel's older sister.
- Archie Adamos as Dado, husband of Precy who managed to witness some of Anna's miracles
- Mel Kimura as Ursula, who owns a vacant lot in their town. But when a child wishes that the mini tab pool on the vacant lot was a big swimming pool for him and his friends to enjoy more. After Anna touches the boy, the lot automatically has a very big pool for children but since Ursula owns the lot, no one will enter it if they won't per her for the entrance.
- Rudy Meyer as Carding, a concerned neighbor who debated on Ursula's decision for the pool entrance.
- Andrea del Rosario as April, one of the girls who were willing to die and kill anyone that would get Elwood's heart and partnership.
- Vanessa del Bianco as Valerie, one of the girls who was willing to die and kill anyone who would get Elwood's heart and partnership.
- Carol Banawa as Rowena, a close friend of Elwood and Anna and the only girl in the town who is immune to Elwood's love pheromones. This could be a fact that when she wished on wanting to have a true love in life, one that would not lie to her and protect her all the time and know her inside and out (actually thinking of Elwood then Anna touched her) giving her the ability to be immune on any form of seduction.
- Mon Confiado as Choy, the one who was hired by Joy to kill Lolo Sotero but failed due to the main protagonist's rescue.
- Malou Crisologo as Ruby a Pinay TV reporter who reported the unusual happening in the town of Anna and Anna herself.
- Shamaine Buencamino as Rica, a neighbor in Anna's town
- Don Laurel as Darwin, a neighbor in Anna's town.
- Felindo Obach as Kikoy, a neighbor in Anna's town
- Noel Carpio as Cosme, a neighbor in Anna's town and a police officer
- Ruby Solmenaro as Meding, a neighbor in Anna's town
- Lani Tapia as Melody, a neighbor in Anna's town
- Luz Imperial as Oyang, a neighbor in Anna's town
- John Tionloc as Popoy, a neighbor in Anna's town
- Isaac Villalobos as Jasper, a neighbor in Anna's town
- Wamachill Guangco as Aida, a neighbor in Anna's town
- Jon Villarin as Matias, a neighbor in Anna's town

== Production ==
The majority of the visual effects of the film were handled by Roadrunner Network, Inc. The titles were handled by Cinemagic while Star Film Laboratories handled the film processing.

Prats, Magdayao, and Dalrymple were from the said movie 3 months before Marinella, which premiered on February 8, 1999, as an afternoon soap opera that aired on the ABS-CBN network.
