= Our Song (disambiguation) =

"Our Song" is a 2007 song by Taylor Swift. It may also refer to:

== Film, television and theatre ==
- Our Song (film), a 2000 American film by Jim McKay
- "Our Song" (Webster), a 1987 TV episode
- Our Song, a 1988 play by Keith Waterhouse

== Songs ==
- "Our Song" (Anne-Marie and Niall Horan song), 2021
- "Our Song" (Goodnight Nurse song), 2006
- "Our Song" (Yes song), 1983
- Our Song (Jack Jones song), 1967
- "Our Song", by M2M from Shades of Purple, 2000
- "Our Song", by Matchbox Twenty from North, 2012
- "Our Song", by Pink from Trustfall, 2023
- "Our Song", by Plain White T's from Wonders of the Younger, 2010
- "Our Song", by Ron Geesin and Roger Waters from Music from The Body, 1970
- "Our Song", by the Spill Canvas, 2010
- "Our Song", by the xx from Coexist, 2012

== See also ==
- Our Songs (disambiguation)
- Your Song (disambiguation)
