= Serena Dalrymple =

Filipino actress

- Born: Serena Gail Dalrymple; September 7, 1990 (age 36); Pasay, Metro Manila, Philippines
- Education: De La Salle–College of Saint Benilde; Hult International Business School
- Occupation: Actress
- Years active: 1997–2015
- Agent: Star Magic (1998–2005)
- Spouse: Thomas Bredillet (m. 2022)
- Children: 2

Serena Gail Dalrymple (born September 7, 1990) is a Filipino actress who had been officially retired from show business since 2005, though she twice briefly returned to star in the 2008 film Ang Tanging Ina Ninyong Lahat and in the 2010 film Ang Tanging Ina Mo (Last na 'To!). During her career, she played roles in a number of movies and television series, largely with ABS-CBN.

== Early life and education ==
Serena Gail Dalrymple was born on September 7, 1990. She is the daughter of Robert Lloyd Dalrymple, a Scottish American and a former military officer, and Wilma Billones-Dalrymple.

She attended high school at the O. B. Montessori Center in Las Piñas. She then went on to study export management at the De La Salle-College of Saint Benilde and aimed to attend university in the United States. Dalrymple obtained a master's degree in Business Administration from Hult International in 2014.

== Career ==
Dalrymple began her career in show business in 1997 after her famous television commercial of Jollibee "Isa pa-isa pang chicken joy". Her acting skills earned her minor roles in some movies, through which she began to receive wider recognition.

Her first movie, Haba-baba-doo, Puti-puti-poo! which released in 1998, brought her alongside fellow child actress Camille Prats along with Hiling with their another child actress Shaina Magdayao two months before Marinella that premiered on February 8, 1999 as an afternoon soap opera. Following appearance, she was given a role in Tong Tatlong Tatay Kong Pakitong-kitong, which was released that same year and Bata, Bata... Pa'no Ka Ginawa? with co-star Carlo Aquino. The following year she starred in three movies: Type Kita, Walang Kokontra, Tik Tak Toys My Kolokotoys and the anthology series Wansapanataym: The Movie. After participating in subsequent movies, she began to star in television series in 2001.

The first, entitled Sa Dulo ng Walang Hanggan, featured co-star Claudine Barretto and lasted from 2001 to 2003. While doing that series, she was given another role in Eto Na Ang Susunod Na Kabanata with Roderick Paulate. In 2003, she starred in the hit series Sana'y Wala Nang Wakas alongside Jericho Rosales. Later that year, she also played alongside comedy queen Ai-Ai de las Alas in the hit movie and sitcom Ang Tanging Ina. Afterwards, she did additional movies and eventually her last show Spirits with other teen contract stars of Star Magic.

Dalrymple announced her retirement from show business in 2004, but reappeared in the movies Ang Tanging Ina Ninyong Lahat and Ang Tanging Ina Mo (Last na 'To!). In 2015, she appeared in an episode of the talk show Kababayan Today.

== Personal life ==
Dalrymple has two sisters, Sarah and Samantha. Her maternal ancestors come from the southern province of Cebu; her grandmother and other relatives are buried there. Her father died of a heart attack when she was five, while her mother became ill with pneumonia and died as well five years later, in 2000. After her mother's death, she was raised by an uncle. Outside of show business, she is also interested in skateboarding with her sister Samantha. Co-actresses in Marinella Shaina Magdayao and Camille Prats have been friends with Dalrymple since their afternoon TV show.

After retiring from show business, Dalrymple moved to the United States, where she married Thomas Bredillet on October 1, 2022. She gave birth to her first child in 2024, followed by a second in 2026. Dalrymple also keeps two dogs, a Golden Retriever and an Alaskan Malamute.

== Filmography ==
=== Film ===
Year	Title	Role
1998	Haba-baba-doo! Puti-puti-poo!	Serena
1998	Tong Tatlong Tatay Kong Pakitong-kitong	Jingle
1998	Bata, Bata... Pa'no Ka Ginawa?	Maya
1999	Hiling	Trinket
1999	Type Kita... Walang Kokontra	Nene
1999	Tik Tak Toys My Kolokotoys	Bullet
1999	Wansapanataym: The Movie	Barbiel
1999	Isprikitik: Walastik Kung Pumitik	Bonna
2000	Daddy O, Baby O!	Anna
2001	Mila	Jenny
2003	Ang Tanging Ina	Cate
2004	I Will Survive	Peachy
2008	Ang Tanging Ina N'yong Lahat	Cate
2010	Ang Tanging Ina Mo (Last na 'To!)	Cate

=== Television ===
Year	Title	Role
1997–1998	Oki Doki Doc	Pie
1997–2002	Wansapanataym	Various roles
1998	Star Drama Theater: Jericho | Dexter's Day Out	Sugar
1999–2001	Marinella	Ella Domingo / Rodriguez
2001	Sa Dulo ng Walang Hanggan	Maying
2001	Mary D' Potter	Kelly
2001	Eto Na Ang Susunod Na Kabanata	Duchess
2003	Sana'y Wala Nang Wakas	Rain Soriano
2003	Ang Tanging Ina	Kate
2004	Spirits	Liz
2010	Simply KC	Herself
2010	Maalaala Mo Kaya	
2015	Kababayan Today	Guest

== Awards and nominations ==
Year	Film Award/Critics	Award	Work	Result
1999	Young Critics Circle	Best Performer	Bata, Bata... Pa'no Ka Ginawa?	Nominated
1999	FAP Awards	Best Supporting Actress	Bata, Bata... Pa'no Ka Ginawa?	Won
1999	Star Awards for Movies	New Movie Actress of the Year	Bata, Bata... Pa'no Ka Ginawa?	Won
1999	Gawad Urian Award	Best Supporting Actress (Pinakamahusay na Pangalawang Aktres)	Bata, Bata... Pa'no Ka Ginawa?	Won
1999	FAMAS Award	Best Child Actress	Bata, Bata... Pa'no Ka Ginawa?	Won
2000	Guillermo Mendoza Memorial Scholarship Foundation Award	Most Popular Child Actress		Won
2002	Guillermo Mendoza Memorial Scholarship Foundation Award	Most Popular Child Actress		Won
