= Bata, Bata... Pa'no Ka Ginawa? =

1988 novel by Lualhati Torres Bautista

Bata, Bata... Pa’no Ka Ginawa?
- Author: Lualhati Torres Bautista
- Language: Filipino
- Genre: Fiction
- Publisher: Carmelo & Bauermann
- Publication date: 1988
- Publication place: Philippines

Bata, Bata... Pa'no Ka Ginawa? (lit. Child, Child... how Were You Made?, also known as Lea's Story) is a novel written in Filipino by the female writer, Lualhati Bautista, released in 1988. Lea's Story centers around the life of Lea, a women's rights activist who struggles to raise her children as a single mother while working a demanding job at a women's crisis center. A film adaptation directed by Chito S. Roño was released in 1998.

== Background ==
The novel is about the role of a woman, like its author, within Filipino society wherein males historically assumed more dominant roles. At one time, Filipina women would normally defer to their husbands and other men. The role of women was to raise children, perform household chores, and attend to the needs of their husbands. It was not customary for women to discuss political issues. But the face and ambience of the perceived role of women in society changed, as society itself was transformed. The doors of offices were opened to give way to women workers. They were given a place where their complaints regarding women rights could be heard, as well as their concept about life and livelihood, earning them a voice within and outside the boundaries of home.

This is the subject discussed and revealed by Lualhati Bautista's novel which has 32 chapters. The work narrates the life of Lea, a working mother, who has two children – a young girl and a young boy. And for this reason, the novel depicts the society's view of women, how it is to be a mother, and how a mother executes this role through modern-day concepts of parenthood.

== Plot summary ==
The novel began with an introductory chapter about the graduation day from kindergarten of Maya, Lea's daughter. A program; and a celebration were held. In the beginning, everything in Lea's life was going smoothly – her life in connection with her children, with friends of the opposite gender, and with her volunteer work for a human rights organization. But Lea's children were both growing-up – and Lea could see their gradual transformation. There were the changes in their ways and personalities: Maya's curiosity was becoming more obvious every day, while Ojie was crossing the boundaries from boyhood to teenage to adulthood.

A scene came when Lea's former husband came back to persuade Ojie to go with him to the United States. Lea experienced the fear of losing both her children, when the fathers of her children decide to take them away from her embrace. She also needed to spend more time for work and with the organization she was volunteering for.

In the end, both of Lea's children decided to choose to stay with her – a decision that Lea never forced upon them. Another graduation day of students was the main event in the novel's final chapter, where Lea was the guest-of-honor. Lea delivered a speech that discusses the topic of how life evolves, and on how time consumes itself so quickly, as fast as how human beings grow, change, progress and mature. Lea leaves a message to her audience that a graduation day is not an end because it is actually the beginning of everything else that will come in a person's life.

== Translation ==
The excerpts from Lualhati Bautista's novels were included in the anthology, Tulikärpänen, a book of short stories collectively written by Filipino women and was published in Finland by The Finnish-Philippine Society (FPS), a non-governmental organization established in 1988. Tulikärpänen was edited and translated by Riitta Vartti in collaboration with other authors. In Firefly: Writings by Various Authors, the English-language version of the Finnish-language collection, the featured excerpt from Bata, Bata, Pa'no Ka Ginawa? was given the title Children's Party. Tulikärpänen was the first book of writings by Filipino women to be published in Finland.

== 1998 film adaptation ==
Bata, Bata... Pa'no Ka Ginawa?
- Lea's Story
- Directed by: Chito S. Roño
- Screenplay by: Lualhati Bautista
- Based on: Bata, Bata... Pa’no Ka Ginawa? by Lualhati Bautista
- Produced by: Charo Santos-Concio; Malou N. Santos; Trina N. Dayrit
- Starring: Vilma Santos; Albert Martinez; Ariel Rivera; Raymond Bagatsing; Carlo Aquino; Serena Dalrymple; Cherry Pie Picache; Angel Aquino
- Cinematography: Charlie Peralta
- Edited by: Jaime B. Davila
- Music by: Jessie Lasaten
- Production company: Star Cinema
- Distributed by: ABS-CBN Film Productions
- Release date: September 9, 1998
- Running time: 110 minutes
- Country: Philippines
- Language: Filipino

Bata, Bata... Pa'no Ka Ginawa? is a 1998 Philippine family drama film directed by Chito S. Roño from a screenplay written by Lualhati Bautista, based on her 1988 novel of the same name. The film stars Vilma Santos, Albert Martinez, Carlo Aquino, Serena Dalrymple, Ariel Rivera, Cherry Pie Picache, Angel Aquino, and Raymond Bagatsing, with a supporting cast that includes Rosemarie Gil, Dexter Doria, Cita Astals, Menggie Cobarrubias, and Lucy Quinto.

Produced and distributed by Star Cinema, the film was theatrically released on September 9, 1998.

=== Main characters ===
- Vilma Santos as Lea Bustamante - A working mother, who has two children and brought them up with her own effort. She is a woman of courage in facing her problem, and strongly believes that for every problem there is always a solution. Lea represents the society's view of women, how it is to be a mother, and how a mother executes this role through modern-day concepts of parenthood.
- Ariel Rivera as Raffy de Lara - The first husband of Lea and the father of Ogie. He is a type of person who is quiet and does not express his feelings that much. After he left his family for his job, he came back to see Ogie, which began the conflict of the story.
- Albert Martinez as Ding Gascon - The live-in partner of Lea and the father of Maya. He is a person who was still very close to his mother despite his age to the point of dependency. Though he may not have performed his duties well as a replacement father for Ogie, he acted well in his role as a father of Maya.
- Raymond Bagatsing as Johnny Deogracias - Lea's closest friend. He goes with her in any trip they planned, except the one trip to Baguio because of his busy shifts.
- Carlo Aquino as Ojie de Lara - The only son of Lea and Raffy and the eldest child of Lea. He was at a young age when his father left him. He asked so many questions to his mother on why she and his father did not live together with them. Being a teenager, he became conscious, experimented and discovered what life really is.
- Serena Dalrymple as Maya Gascon - The daughter of Lea and Ding; the youngest child of Lea. A fresh graduate from kindergarten school and possesses intelligence and beauty. She is a smart and outspoken six-year-old child and acts more maturely than her peers.
- Cherry Pie Picache as Sr. Ann - a nun and boss of Lea in the office where she works, and part of the women at the crisis nongovernment group.
- Angel Aquino as Elinor - Raffy's second wife after Lea. She is loving, sweet, and caring to her family, and willing to do everything for her family.

=== Supporting characters ===
- Rosemarie Gil as Mrs. Rosario Zalamea, the school's principal
- Dexter Doria as Mrs. Gatmaitan
- Cita Astals as Mrs. Olivarez, a battered wife
- Andrea del Rosario as Jinky
- Lucy Quinto as Lola Sylvia
- Menggie Cobarrubias as Mr. Olivarez
- Carmen Serafin as Rosita

=== Other characters ===
- Josie Tagle as Girl Crying's mother
- Ronalisa Cheng as Girl Crying
- Jeralyn Narciso as Ms. Talent
- Cory Dela Cruz as Nun
- Joy Santos as Nun
- Marivic Suspine as Nun
- Girlie Alcantara as Lawyer
- Emma Hizola as Lea's Baguio companion
- Monette G. Quioge as Lea's Baguio companion (as Monette Quiogue)
- Loy Rabor as Lea's Baguio companion
- Nora Protacio as Rally Speaker
- Dheng Foz as Hairstylist
- Medy Sordan as Manicurist
- Junard Zacarias as Dumb actor

== See also ==
- Philippine literature
