= Our Songs =

Our Songs may refer to:

- "Our Songs" (song), a 2010 song by Buono!
- Our Songs (album), a 2023 album by Anastacia

== See also ==
- Our Song (disambiguation)
