= The Halt =

2019 dystopian drama film by Lav Diaz

- Film poster
- Filipino: Ang Hupa
- Directed by: Lav Diaz
- Written by: Lav Diaz
- Starring: Hazel Orencio; Joel Lamangan; Piolo Pascual; Shaina Magdayao
- Cinematography: Daniel Uy
- Edited by: Lav Diaz
- Production companies: Sine Olivia Pilipinas; Spring Films
- Distributed by: ARP Sélection
- Release date: 22 May 2019 (Cannes)
- Running time: 276 minutes
- Country: Philippines

The Halt (Filipino: Ang Hupa) is a 2019 Filipino dystopian drama film edited, written, and directed by Lav Diaz. It was screened in the Directors' Fortnight section at the 2019 Cannes Film Festival.

== Synopsis ==
Set in 2034 after a massive volcanic eruption, Manila has been in the dark for the last three years without a single sunlight. Riots control countries and communities. Epidemics ravage the continent. Millions have died and millions more have left.

== Cast ==
- Hazel Orencio
- Joel Lamangan
- Piolo Pascual
- Shaina Magdayao
- Dolly de Leon

== Reception ==
=== Critical response ===
On Rotten Tomatoes, the film has an approval rating of 88% based on 8 reviews.

=== Awards ===
It won Best Film at the Asian Film Festival Barcelona.
