= Andrea Del Rosario =

Filipina actress, model and politician

Vice Mayor of Calatagan, Batangas
- In office June 30, 2016 – June 30, 2019
- Mayor: Peter Oliver M. Palacio
- Preceded by: Glenn Aytona
- Succeeded by: Rogelio Zarraga

Personal details
- Born: Andrea Anne Villanueva Del Rosario; November 27, 1977 (age 48) Catbalogan, Samar, Philippines
- Party: Nacionalista (2016–2018); Independent (2018–present)
- Children: 1
- Musical career
- Genres: Pop; Dance-pop
- Instruments: Vocals
- Years active: 1996–present
- Labels: Viva Records; GMA Artist Center; Star Music
- Member of: Viva Hot Babes

Andrea Anne Villanueva Del Rosario (born November 27, 1977) is a Filipino actress, beauty queen, model, and politician. She was a former member of the girl group Viva Hot Babes and the Batch 3 of Star Magic. She was a 4th Runner-up in Miss Philippines Earth 2001 winning a special award of Miss Close Up Killer Smile.

In 2006, she made her first television appearance as a series regular for the remake of the Primetime soap Gulong ng Palad as Mimi Sandoval. Her role was very much praised as the arch type antagonist.

In 2016, Del Rosario entered politics as a candidate for vice mayor of Calatagan, Batangas, in the 2016 local elections on May 9, 2016. She later won, and proclaimed as the newly elected vice mayor, after the election.

Aside from politics and showbiz, Del Rosario ventured into food business as a co-owner of the Longganisa Sorpresa, a restaurant, which features dishes from longganisa.

== Filmography ==
=== Film ===
Year	Title	Role
1997	Diliryo	
1998	Nagbibinata	Jackie
1998	Bata, Bata... Pa'no Ka Ginawa?	Jinky
1998	Hiling	April
1999	Mula sa Puso	Wendy
1999	Kiss mo 'ko	Maan
2000	Minsan, Minahal Kita	Lynette
2000	Bukas Na Lang Kita Mamahalin	
2001	Narinig Mo Na Ba ang L8est?	Karen
2002	Jologs	Student Assistant
2002	Bestman: 4 Better, Not 4 Worse	Rosa
2003	Lupe: A Seaman's Wife	Lupe
2003	Keka	Reporter
2003	Bugbog Sarado	Shy
2003	Filipinas	Jacqueline
2005	Kutob	Sandra
2006	Pacquiao: The Movie	Manny's Woman 1
2006	Rome & Juliet	Juliet Flores
2007	Chopsuey	Annette Wong
2007	One Percent Full	Girly
2009	Tutok	Aurora
2009	Medalya	
2009	Fidel	Vega
2010	Working Girls	Rachel
2014	Magtiwala Ka: A Yolanda Story	
2017	Fangirl Fanboy	
2018	Para sa Broken Hearted	
2019	Aurora	Celine
2019	Elise	
2019	Ulan	
2019	Maria	Felicia
2020	Hindi Tayo Pwede	
2022	May–December-January	Claire
2023	Sex Games	Susan
2024	My Zombabe	Marisol
2025	Posthouse	

Key
†	Denotes films that have not yet been released

=== Television ===
Year	Title	Role
1996–1998	Palibhasa Lalake	Seksi
1996–2001	Star Drama Presents	
1996	Gimik	Samantha
1997	Mula sa Puso	Wendy
1999	Esperanza	Ditas
1999	Marinella	Bianca Asuncion (antagonist)
1999-2000	Labs Ko Si Babe	SPO2 Daniella "Dani" Acevedo
2001	Attagirl	Jhoanne Mae
2002	Ikaw Lang ang Mamahalin	Melissa
2002	Habang Kapiling Ka	Nanette
2006	Gulong ng Palad	Mimi Sandoval (main antagonist)
2006	Makita Ka Lang Muli	Sofia
2007	Margarita	Amanda
2008	Gaano Kadalas ang Minsan	Margareta
2008	Dyesebel	Vivian Montemayor
2008–2009	Saan Darating ang Umaga?	Patricia Bernales
2009–2010	May Bukas Pa	Janet
2009–2010	Tinik sa Dibdib	Divine
2011	Rod Santiago's The Sisters	Daniela
2011	Munting Heredera	Kate Lobregat
2012	Maalaala Mo Kaya: Baunan	Gina
2012	Wansapanataym: Beauty Is The Beast	Isabel
2013	Kidlat	Priscilla
2013	Maalaala Mo Kaya: Ilog	Anna
2013	Misibis Bay	Maggie
2013	Maalaala Mo Kaya: Family Picture	Daisy
2014	Kambal Sirena	Desiree Antonio
2014	Niño	Olivia
2014	Ipaglaban Mo: Love Ko Si Sir	Melanie Castro
2015	Pari 'Koy	Melba
2015	Maynila: My Absentee Mom	
2015	Princess in the Palace	Diane Marquez
2016	Maalaala Mo Kaya: Pasa	Bita
2016	Sinungaling Mong Puso	Lourdes Robles
2017	Maalaala Mo Kaya: Stroller	Liezl
2017–2018	Super Ma'am	Reyna Azravach (guest antagonist)
2018	Inday Will Always Love You	Amelia
2018	Maalaala Mo Kaya: Drawing	Gigi
2019	Ipaglaban Mo: Caregiver	Leslie
2019	Ipaglaban Mo: Biyaheng Langit	Jenny Serrano
2020	Maalaala Mo Kaya: Mata	Joaquin's mother
2020	Bawal na Game Show	Herself / Contestant
2020	Oh, Mando!	Sandra Deputado
2021	Huwag Kang Mangamba	Thelma Policarpio (antagonist)
2022	Wish Ko Lang: Pagdurusa	Milagros
2022	Love You Stranger	Lorraine Escalante
2023	Dirty Linen	Atty. Olga Arguelles
2023	Wish Ko Lang: Sinapian	Vangie
2023	Black Rider	Mama Belle
2024	Makiling	Natalie Salamanca-Terra (antagonist)
2024	Carlo J. Caparas' Lumuhod Ka sa Lupa	Eunice "Mother Eu" Aguirre (antagonist)
2025	My Ilonggo Girl	Margaret Palma (anti-hero)
2025	Para sa Isa't Isa	Dina Magtibay
2025	I Love You Since 1892	Doña Juanita Alfonso
2026	Hell University	Madam Violet (main antagonist)
