= Lyra (TV series) =

Philippine television drama series

- Genre: Drama
- Directed by: Diego Salazar
- Starring: Shaina Magdayao
- Opening theme: "Nasaan Ka?" by Vina Morales
- Ending theme: "Walang Hanggan" by April Boy Regino
- Country of origin: Philippines
- Original language: Tagalog
- No. of episodes: 200

Production
- Executive producer: Lenny C. Parto
- Camera setup: Multiple-camera setup
- Running time: 30 minutes
- Production company: GMA Entertainment TV

Original release
- Network: GMA Network
- Release: April 8, 1996 – January 3, 1997

Lyra is a Philippine television drama series broadcast by GMA Network. It stars Shaina Magdayao in the title role. It premiered on April 8, 1996. The series concluded on January 3, 1997, with a total of 200 episodes.

== Cast and characters ==
Cast

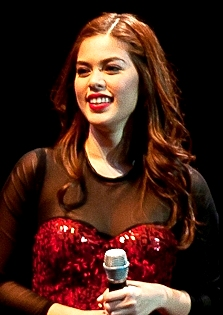
Shaina Magdayao

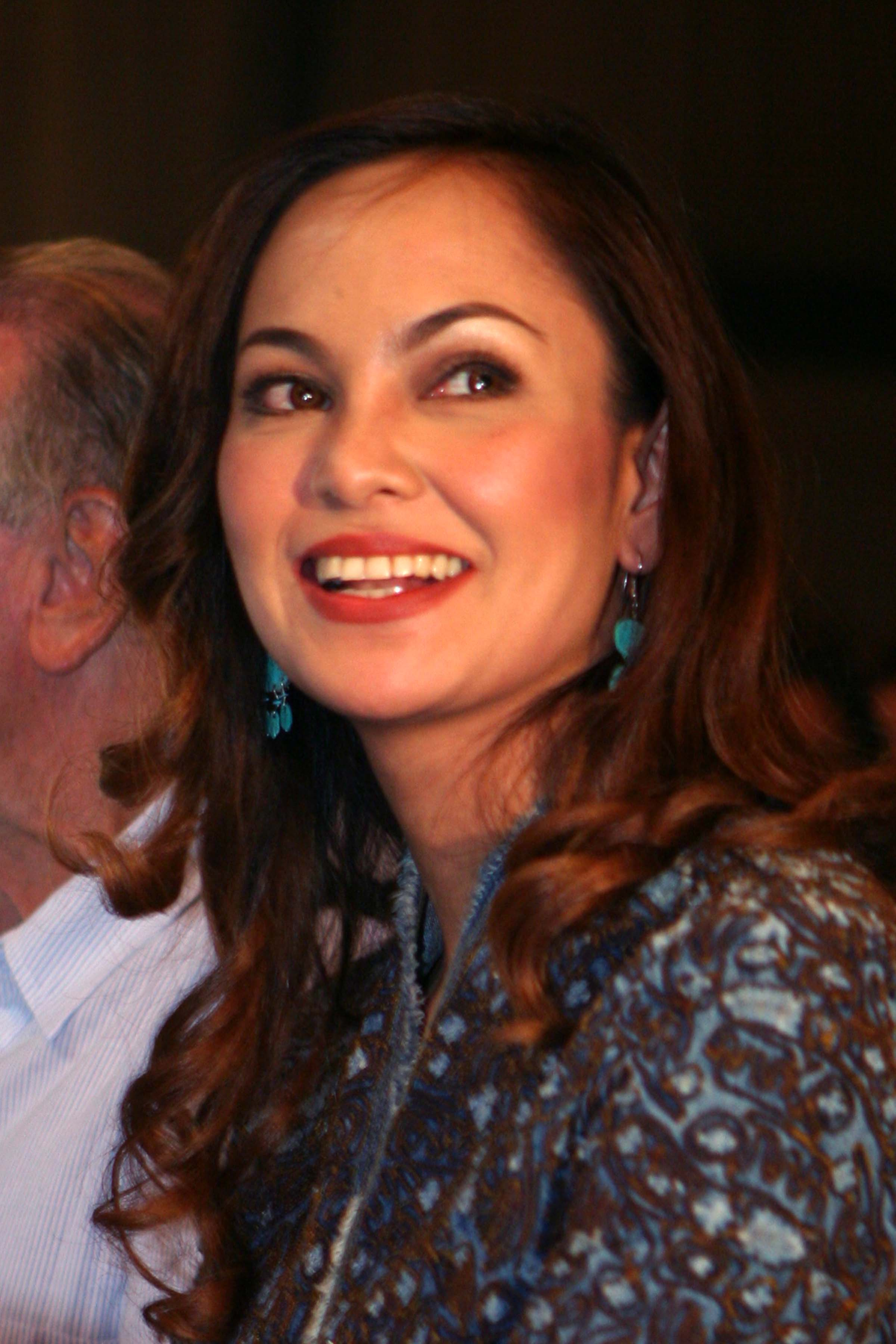
Eula Valdez

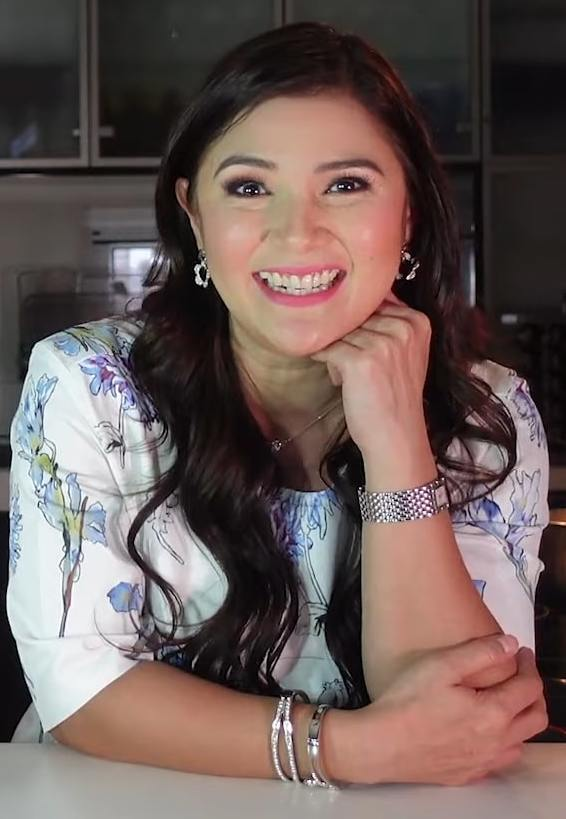
Vina Morales

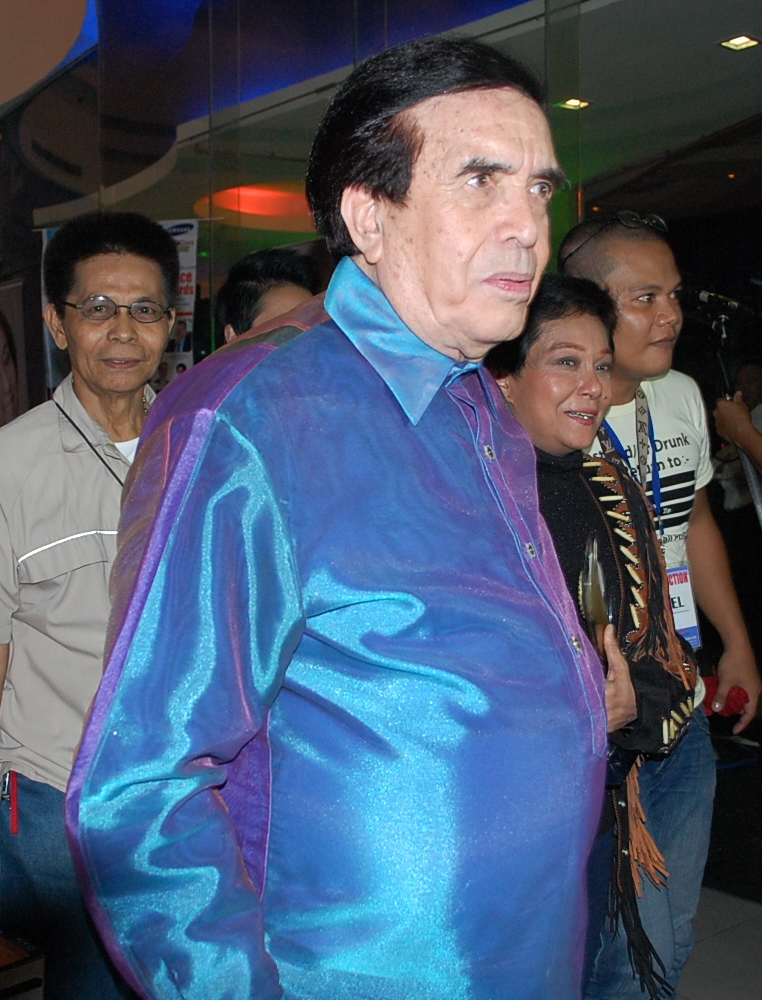
German Moreno

Lead cast

- Shaina Magdayao as Lyra Monteverde

Supporting cast

- Eula Valdez as Gina Monteverde
- Lolit Solis as Marcia
- Vina Morales as Edene
- German Moreno as Kwaro
- Krista Ranillo as Shayne

== Accolades ==
Accolades received by Lyra
Year	Award	Category	Recipient	Result	Ref.
1996	10th PMPC Star Awards for Television	Best Daytime Drama Series	Lyra	Won	
1996	10th PMPC Star Awards for Television	Best New Female Television Personality	Shaina Magdayao	Won	
