= Marinella (TV series) =

1999–2001 Philippine television drama series

- Title card
- Genre: Drama
- Created by: ABS-CBN Studios
- Written by: Keiko Aquino Galvez; Jillmer S. Dy; Marcia de Jesus; Richard Cruz; Reggie Amigo; Henry Quitain
- Directed by: Jerry Lopez Sineneng; Khryss Adalia; F.M. Reyes; Cathy Garcia-Sampana; Ben Panaligan
- Creative director: Deo Endrinal
- Starring: Camille Prats; Shaina Magdayao; Serena Dalrymple
- Ending theme: "Marinella" by Michelle Ayalde
- Country of origin: Philippines
- Original language: Filipino
- No. of episodes: 576

Production
- Executive producers: Marivic H. Oducayen; Lourdes M. De Guzman
- Editor: Ben Panaligan
- Running time: 15-20 minutes
- Production company: Dreamscape Entertainment

Original release
- Network: ABS-CBN
- Release: February 8, 1999 – May 11, 2001

Marinella is a Philippine television drama series broadcast by ABS-CBN. Directed by Jerry Lopez Sineneng, Khryss Adalia, F.M. Reyes, Cathy Garcia-Sampana and Ben Panaligan, it stars Camille Prats, Shaina Magdayao and Serena Dalrymple. It aired on the network's afternoon line up and worldwide on TFC from February 8, 1999, to May 11, 2001, replacing Alondra in Cristy Per Minute's timeslot and was replaced by Recuerdo de Amor.

The series is streaming online on YouTube.

== Premise ==
The lives of three friends, Marie de Guzmán, Rina Fuentes, and Ella Domingo are intertwined. After a huge fire separated the girls from their respective families, they decided to band together as a unit they can call family.

They have overlooked one big obstacle: Katrina Rodríguez will never allow the three to live in peace: she is out to destroy each of them: Marie is the daughter of Katrina's former lover; Rina knows too much of Rodríguez family's secrets and an heiress of Rodriguez and Villareal; Ella is the sole heiress of the ₱800-million wealth of the Rodríguez family. Katrina's nemesis is the Rodriguez matriarch Doña Corazón, who is ready to stop her; as her long-lost aunt, she knows Katrina's darkest secrets.

== Cast and characters ==
=== Main cast ===
- Camille Prats as Marie de Guzmán / Marie Reynoso
- Shaina Magdayao as Rina Fuentes / Angélica Villareal
- Serena Dalrymple as Ella Domingo / Ella Rodríguez / Niña

=== Supporting cast ===
- Río Locsín as Katrina Rodríguez-Villareal (main antagonist)
- Rita Ávila as Marisa Rodríguez / Michelle de la Cruz
- Eula Valdez as Lilybeth "Bebeng" Marasigan
- Lito Pimentel as Federico Villareal
- Raymond Bagatsing as Leo Rodríguez and Jake Arcellana-Rodríguez
- Carmen Enríquez as Doña Corazón Rodríguez
- Bella Flores as Doña Guada Villareal
- Hilda Koronel as Adela Rodríguez (first main antagonist)
- Allan Paule as Abel de Guzmán
- Alicia Alonzo as Minda
- Emilio García as Julio Reynoso
- Bojo Molina as Ron Martínez
- Agatha Tapan as Vanessa Rodríguez
- Perla Bautista as Mameng Marasigan
- Richard Bonin as Rolly

=== Recurring cast ===
- Sharmaine Suárez as Sheila Fuentes
- William Lorenzo as Rodolfo "Dolfo" de León
- Rica Peralejo as Jenny
- Andrea Del Rosario as Bianca Asunción
- Joy Viado as Doray
- Connie Chua as Loida
- Anita Linda as Doña Beatriz
- Peewee O'Hara as Atty. Galang
- Dexter Doria as Belinda
- Princess Schuck as Cristina
- Piolo Pascual as Paolo
- Gerard Pizzaras as Emil
- Gigi Locsín as Cora
- Stefano Mori as Jun
- Tess Dumpit as Lucy
- John Lapus as Uncle Joselito
- Star Villareal as Joey
- Maricel Laxa as Jessica
- Melissa de León as Raquel
- Andrei Félix as R.J.
- Timmy Cruz as Doctor Anna Rivera / Susana Villareal
- Esther Chávez as Doña Salve Arcellana
- Mel Martínez as Artemio "Tembong" Panganiban
- Mel Kimura as Shirley
- Froilán Sales as George
- Gandong Cervantes as Rodel
- Juan Carlos Castillo as Baldo
- Gilleth Sandico as Mrs. Tan
- J.R. Herrera as Ned
- Lester Llansang as Joseph
- January Isaac (credited as Sandra Gómez) as Lory
- Eva Darren as Editha
- Pocholo Montes as Atty. Arturo Trinidad
- Archie Ventosa as Don Manuel Rodríguez
- Vangie Labalan as Inday
- Dodie Acuña as Danilo
- Susan Corpuz as Mila
- Allan Bautista as Johnny
- Ama Quiambao as Carmen
- B.J. de Jesús as Buboy
- Vivian Foz as Irma de Guzmán/Trina
- Jodi Sta. María as Young Guada
- Dimples Romana as Young Corazón

== Impact ==
Marinella created a phenomenon in the afternoon slot when it posted high ratings on its timeslot. It served as a lead-out program to the already-popular noontime variety program Magandang Tanghali Bayan. Their one-two punch combination at the noontime slot effectively ended the long-time domination of TAPE Inc. (then-producer of Eat Bulaga!) in the same time slot.

Most of the cast members became household names due to the popularity of the series. One of the supporting cast members of the show, Eula Valdez, was pulled out of the series in mid-2000 after ABS-CBN decided to cast her in the lead role of Amor Powers in the primetime series Pangako sa 'Yo.

== Reruns ==
Marinella was previously aired internationally via Cinema One Global from 2013 to 2014. In 2022, reruns of the series began to air on Kapamilya Online Live Global every 12:00 am to 2:00 am from February 17 to August 3, 2022; it was succeeded by Nang Ngumiti ang Langit the following day (August 4).

== See also ==
- List of programs broadcast by ABS-CBN
- List of ABS-CBN Studios original drama series
