= Your Song (disambiguation) =

"Your Song" is a 1970 song by Elton John.

Your Song or Your Songs may also refer to:

== Music ==
- "Tu canción", also recorded in English as "Your Song", a 2018 song by Amaia Romero and Alfred García
- Your Song (EP), a 2007 EP by Guy Sebastian
- "Your Song" (Rita Ora song), 2017
- "Your Song", a 2013 song by Yunchi, aka Yun*chi
- "Your Song", a song by Kate Walsh
- "Your Song", a song by Koda Kumi, a B-side of the single "Take Back"
- "Your Song", a song by Sam Kim from I Am Sam
- "Your Song (One and Only You)", a song by Filipino rock band Parokya ni Edgar
- "Your Song ~Seishun Sensei~", a 2004 song by Aya Matsuura
- Your Songs, a 2009 album by Harry Connick, Jr.

== Television ==
- Your Song, a Cypriot reality talent show broadcast in Mega Channel Cyprus
- Your Song (Philippine TV series), a 2006-11 Filipino musical anthology series
- Your Song (British TV series), a 2026 British singing competition series

== See also ==
- Our Song (disambiguation)
