= Asintado =

2018 Philippine television action drama series

- Title card
- Genre: Action; Family drama; Thriller; Crime; Political; Revenge
- Created by: Rondel P. Lindayag
- Written by: Danica Mae S. Domingo; David F. Diuco; Hazel Karyl Rabasio-Madanguit; Randy Q. Villanueva; Adrelle Emil Alfonso; Maren Kyle Loreño
- Directed by: Lino S. Cayetano; Trina N. Dayrit; Onat A. Diaz; Floy Allan P. Leonardo; Jerome C. Pobocan; Darnel Joy R. Villaflor; Jojo A. Saguin; Jon S. Villarin; Emille Joson
- Starring: Julia Montes; Shaina Magdayao; Aljur Abrenica; Paulo Avelino; Lorna Tolentino; Agot Isidro; Nonie Buencamino
- Music by: Jessie Lasaten
- Opening theme: "Dahil Mahal na Mahal Kita" by Jona
- Composer: Larry Hermoso
- Country of origin: Philippines
- Original language: Tagalog
- No. of seasons: 2
- No. of episodes: 187 (list of episodes)

Production
- Executive producers: Carlo Katigbak; Cory Vidanes; Laurenti Dyogi; Roldeo T. Endrinal
- Producers: Carlina D. dela Merced; Arnel T. Nacario; Beegee Soldao-Gannaban; Catz Magdael-Aborrando
- Production location: Philippines
- Editor: Jay Mendoza
- Running time: 30–43 minutes
- Production company: Dreamscape Entertainment Television

Original release
- Network: ABS-CBN
- Release: January 15 – October 5, 2018

Related
- Bagong Umaga

Asintado (transl. sharpshooter) is a 2018 Philippine television drama action series broadcast by ABS-CBN. Directed by Lino S. Cayetano, Trina N. Dayrit, Onat A. Diaz, Floy Allan P. Leonardo, Jerome C. Pobocan, Darnel Joy R. Villaflor, Jojo A. Saguin and Jon S. Villarin, it stars Julia Montes, Shaina Magdayao, Paulo Avelino and Aljur Abrenica. It aired on the network's Kapamilya Gold line up and worldwide on TFC from January 15 to October 5, 2018.

== Series overview ==
The series follows the paths of the Ramirez siblings who live polar opposite lives after being separated at a young age. The siblings' lives are thrust into a world of politics, power and corruption that shake their core values, murder their loved ones and potentially destroy themselves.

Season	Episodes	Originally released	
Season	Episodes	First released	Last released
1	152	January 15, 2018	August 17, 2018
2	35	August 20, 2018	October 5, 2018

=== Season 1 (2018) ===
The older sibling Katrina (Shaina Magdayao) is eager to shed her old life for the gilded world of her rich and powerful adopted parents and she shuts off the memory of her younger sister. The younger sibling, Juliana (Julia Montes) does not stop searching for her sister and embraces the loving and poor family who adopts her. Their paths cross as young adults but they do not recognize each other. They are in love with the same man, Gael Ojeda (Paulo Avelino). Their conflict becomes more dangerous than just a love triangle and sibling rivalry.

=== Season 2 (2018) ===
The season explores the aftermath of Gael's death – from the changes in the characters' relationships, the sacrifices for family, and the consequences of revenge.

== Cast and characters ==
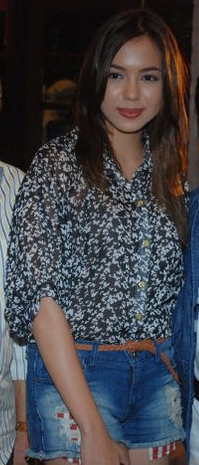
Julia Montes portrays Juliana "Ana"/Juliana Ramirez-Del Mundo

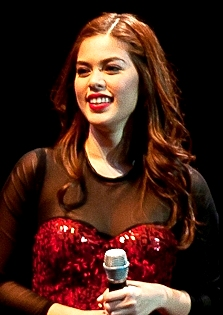
Shaina Magdayao portrays Samantha G. Del Mundo-Guerrero/ Katrina Ramirez

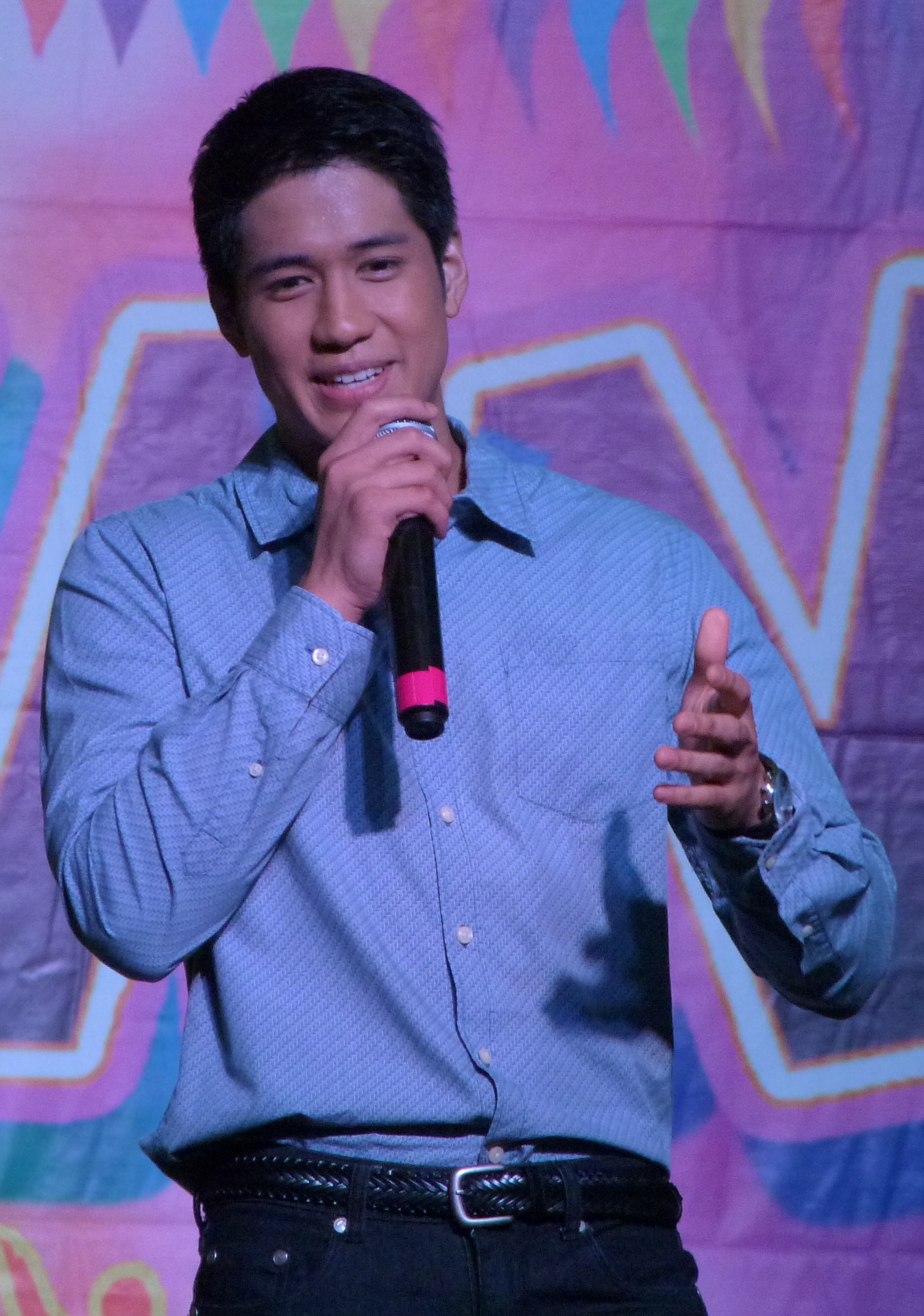
Aljur Abrenica portrays Alexander "Xander" Guerrero

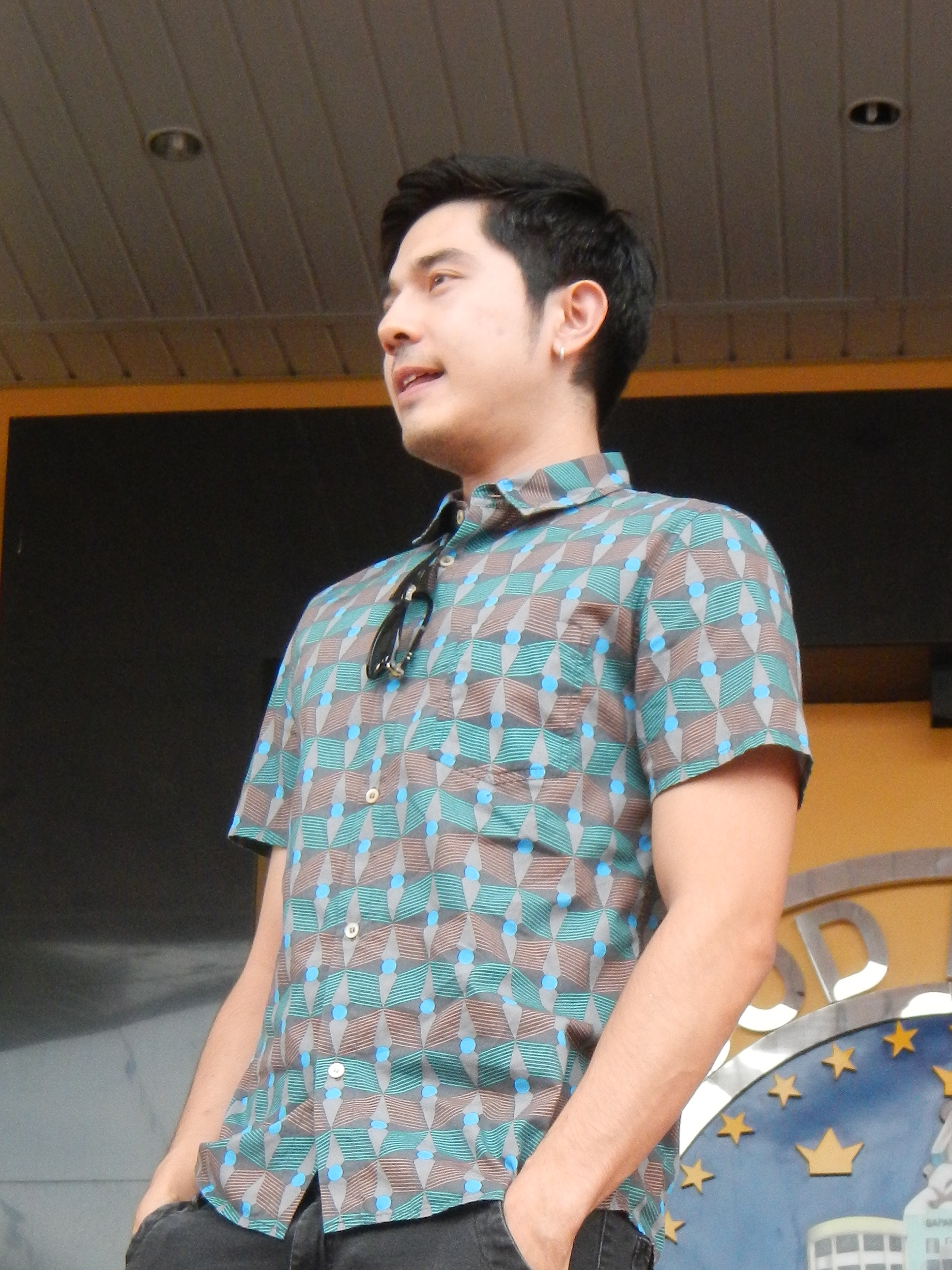
Paulo Avelino portrays Gael Ojeda Del Mundo.

=== Main cast ===
- Julia Montes as Juliana "Ana" Dimasalang-Del Mundo / Juliana Ramirez
- Shaina Magdayao as Samantha "Sam" G. Del Mundo-Guerrero / Katrina Ramirez
- Aljur Abrenica as Alexander "Xander" Guerrero
- Paulo Avelino as Gael O. Del Mundo†

=== Supporting cast ===
- Lorna Tolentino as Miranda Ojeda†
- Cherry Pie Picache as Celeste "Ms. C." Ramos†
- Agot Isidro as Hillary Gonzales-Del Mundo
- Nonie Buencamino as Salvador Del Mundo†
- Empress Schuck as Monalisa "Mona" Calata†
- Arron Villaflor as Ramoncito "Chito" Salazar†
- Louise delos Reyes as Yvonne Calata
- Gloria Sevilla† as Purisima "Puring" Dimasalang
- Julio Diaz as Melchor Gonzales / Manuel De Dios†
- Ronnie Quizon as Jorge Gesmundo†
- Chokoleit† as Gaspar "Gracia" Nuevadez
- Karen Reyes as Emilita "Emmy" Gomez
- Ryle Paolo Tan as Jonathan "Tantan" Dimasalang
- Lemuel Pelayo as Diego Gesmundo
- Jean Saburit as Carlotta Candelaria
- Desiree del Valle as Natasha Ojeda-Calderon

=== Guest cast ===
- Christian Vasquez as Eric Salazar†
- Art Acuña as Maj. Gregorio Calata†
- Mari Kaimo as Senator Arturo Galvez†
- Giovanni Baldisseri as DMO Employer
- Teroy Guzman as Senator Martin Reynoso†
- Bing Davao as Vice President Jaime Montemayor
- Hannah Ledesma as Rowena Barrios†
- Charles Kieron as Gavin O. Calderon
- Vivoree Esclito as Charie Tamayo
- Dolly de Leon as Atty. Agnes Villonco

=== Special participation ===
- Luis Alandy as Robert Ramirez†
- Tanya Garcia as Criselda Gaspar-Ramirez†
- Lito Pimentel as Vicente Dimasalang†
- Myel de Leon as young Juliana/Ana
- Jana Agoncillo as young Katrina/Samantha
- Miguel Diokno as young Gael
- Brandon Axl as young Xander
- Mariella Laurel as young Miranda
- Kazel Kinouchi as young Hillary
- Jess Mendoza as young Salvador

== Production ==
=== Casting ===
Angelica Panganiban was originally supposed to co-star in this project, but was forced to drop out due to scheduling conflicts. Isabelle Daza was cast at a later point, but then dropped out due to her pregnancy. She was replaced by Shaina Magdayao. JC Santos was initially part of the main cast, but was pulled by management for a different project. He was replaced by Aljur Abrenica.

=== Filming ===
According to an episode of the talk show Tonight with Boy Abunda In July 2017, Julia Montes announced that the series would begin principal photography In August 2017. On August 1, 2017, Dreamscape publicity head Eric John Salut confirmed the show started filming.

=== Title ===
The drama was originally titled as Victims of Love. In September 2017, the title was changed to Asintado.

== Reception ==
Kantar Media National TV Ratings (7:50PM PST)
Pilot Episode	Finale Episode	Peak	Average
17.7% January 15, 2018	19.9% October 5, 2018	19.9% October 5, 2018	TBD

== International broadcast ==
Country	Network	Title	Date
Myanmar	Myanmar National TV	အချစ်အမုန်းတိုက်ပွဲ	September 21 – November 15, 2018 (season 1); January 7 – April 12, 2019 (season 2)
Kenya	StarTimes Novela E1	Asintado	April 7, 2019
Réunion	Antenne Réunion	Asintado	September 10, 2021

== See also ==
- List of programs broadcast by ABS-CBN
- List of ABS-CBN drama series
