= Shaina Magdayao =

Filipino actress (born 1989)

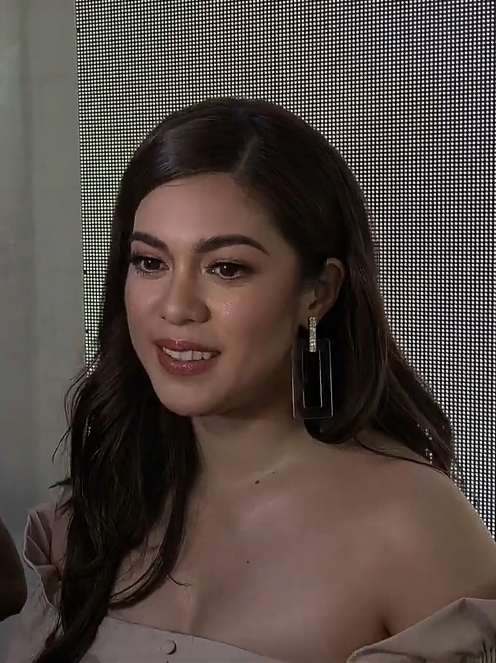
- Magdayao in 2019
- Born: Shaina García Magdayao; November 6, 1989 (age 37); Quezon City, Metro Manila, Philippines
- Other names: Shin; Ina; Shai; Maggie; Shadam
- Occupation: Actress
- Years active: 1995–present
- Agents: Sparkle (1996–1997); Star Magic (1997–present); TV5 Network (2021–present); Advanced Media Broadcasting System (2024–present)
- Height: 1.68 m (5 ft 6 in)
- Relatives: Vina Morales (sister); Luis Gabriel Moreno (nephew)

Shaina Garcia Magdayao (Tagalog: [ʃaʔˈɪnɐ gaɾˈsɪa maɡˈdɐjaʊ, ʃaɪ-]; born November 6, 1989) is a Filipino actress. Known primarily for her dramatic roles in film and television, she began her career as a child actress and starred in her first titular role Lyra. She is the recipient of various accolades including a FAMAS Award, a Metro Manila Film Festival Award, two Gawad Pasado Awards and a Young Critics Circle award, in addition to nominations from Gawad Urian and Luna Awards. Her works have also been competed in numerous film festivals around the world such as Cannes Film Festival, Busan International Film Festival, Berlin International Film Festival, and Locarno International Film Festival.

== Early life and education ==
Shaina Garcia Magdayao was born on November 6, 1989, in Quezon City, Philippines to Enrique Magdayao of Cebu and Deanne Magdayao of Padada, Davao del Sur. She is the youngest of four siblings, including singer-actress Vina Morales. Magdayao attended high school at the UST Angelicum College in Santo Domingo, Quezon City.

== Acting career ==
=== 1995–2002: Early work and breakthrough ===
Magdayao's first film appearance was a supporting role in Campus Girls (1995) which stars her sister Vina Morales. At age 7, Magdayao made her television debut in the series Lyra which premiered in April 1996 under GMA Network. The show won "Best Daytime Drama Series" while Magdayao won "Best New TV Personality" at the 10th PMPC Star Awards for Television. The following year, she transferred to ABS-CBN and appeared in the show Kaybol, Ang Bagong TV. The same year, she played Jennifer Matias in the drama series Mula sa Puso. In 1998, she appeared in two films Pagdating ng Panahon and Hiling, where she stars with Camille Prats and Serena Dalrymple. In 1999, she starred in the fantasy film Wansapanataym: The Movie with Christopher de Leon, Angel Aquino and Serena Dalrymple. The same year, she reunited with Camille Prats and Serena Dalrymple in the afternoon series Marinella.

In 2000, Magdayao was cast in the family drama Tanging Yaman as Carina. Her performance was met with critical acclaim, winning Most Popular Child Actress at the Box Office Entertainment Awards, Best Child Actress at the FAMAS Awards, and Best Performance at the Young Critics Circle, while the film became a success at the Philippine box-office with total earnings of over ₱167 million. The following year, she appeared in two television shows: Sa Dulo ng Walang Hanggan and Ang TV 2. In 2002, she starred the film Mga Batang Lansangan...Ngayon with an ensemble cast and played a supporting role in Ang Agimat: Anting-anting ni Lolo. The same year, she played Violeta Garcia in the afternoon weekend show K2BU with Bea Alonzo and Pia Wurtzbach. She then released her self-titled debut album Shaina under Star Records.

=== 2003–2010: Continued film and television appearances ===
In 2003, Magdayao was cast as Seven Montecillo in the comedy film Ang Tanging Ina. The film was a box-office success, becoming the highest grossing Philippine film of all time at that time with earnings of nearly ₱180 million. She continued making appearances in television through sitcoms Bida si Mister, Bida si Misis and Ang Tanging Ina (TV series) where she reprised her role as Seven. In 2005, she played Hazel Gerochi-Fontanilla in the drama series Ikaw ang Lahat sa Akin. Magdayao made appearances in a number of anthologies in 2006. She starred in several episodes of Komiks the first being the lead roles Agua and Bendita. She next appeared in Your Song, Love Spell and Star Magic Presents. In 2007, Magdayao starred as Selene in one of the most expensive Philippine television shows, Rounin and topbilled her first film in four years opposite Rayver Cruz titled Happy Hearts.

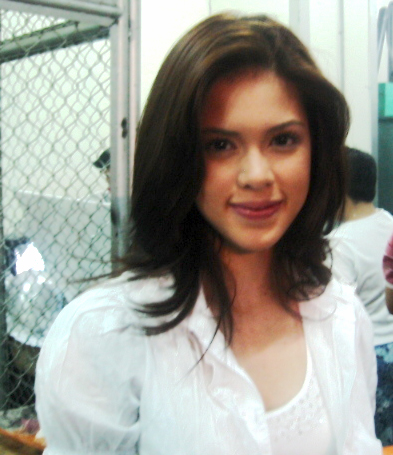
Magdayao at ASAP in 2006

The same year, Magdayao appeared in two more films Katas ng Saudi and Bahay Kubo: A Pinoy Mano Po!, which were official entries at the Metro Manila Film Festival. In 2008, she played Gabby Dizon in the fantasy drama series Lobo. The series marked Magdayao's first ventured into mature roles. It was followed by the series Dragonna where she played the titular role. It also marked the first time she portrayed a superhero character. The series received 15.2% TV ratings upon its premiered, becoming the fifth most watched TV show. The same year, she reprised her role as Seven Montecillo in the sequel Ang Tanging Ina N'yong Lahat. The film broke numerous records at the Philippine box-office, grossing ₱200 million. In 2009, she starred alongside Maja Salvador, Jake Quenca and Geoff Eigenmann.

The same year, she starred with Melissa Ricks in the fantasy drama series Kambal sa Uma. The show dominated its timeslot, averaging 24.9% ratings from April 19–25. She also made a guest appearance in the finale episode of the series May Bukas Pa. Magdayao had three releases in 2010. She starred with an ensemble cast in the family drama Sa 'yo Lamang. Writing for Philippine Entertainment Portal, Elvin Luciano praised Magdayao's ability to "portray intense emotions." She then appeared in two films which were entries at the Metro Manila Film Festival. She starred in another horror film in the franchise Shake, Rattle and Roll XII. For the fourth time, she reprised her role in the comedy film Ang Tanging Ina Mo (Last na 'To!).

=== 2011–2023: Critical acclaim ===
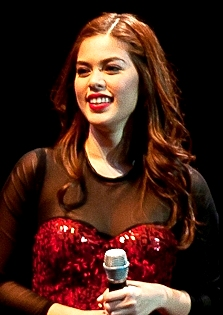
Magdayao at the Star Magic Tour in 2011

Magdayao starred in two television shows in 2010. She played Maribel Dela Fuente in the romantic drama Rubi. She next played the titular role in her first solo lead role Alyna, based on the PHR pocketbook Dominic. Due to the overwhelming reception, the show, which was initially scheduled to conclude in November 2010, was extended until February 2011. The series became the No. 1 daytime soap opera throughout its run, becoming one of the most successful Precious Hearts Romances titles. Magdayao continuously appeared in numerous episodes of Maalaala Mo Kaya, notable for her performances in the episodes "Picture" and "Tubig". Magdayao appeared in three films in 2013. She played a supporting role in the crime thriller On the Job. Magdayao's next role in 2013 was in Cathy Garcia-Molina's comedy drama Four Sisters and a Wedding. The film was well received at the Philippine box-office, earning ₱120 million in its first two weeks. For her portrayal, she won Best Supporting Actress at the Gawad Pasado Award alongside Angel Locsin, Bea Alonzo and Toni Gonzaga.

Her final film appearance in 2013 was a supporting role in the supernatural horror Pagpag: Siyam na Buhay. For her performance, she was nominated for Best Supporting Actress at the Metro Manila Film Festival. Magdayao also played a supporting role in the fantasy drama Juan dela Cruz. In 2015, Magdayao returned to primetime block through the Christian drama Nathaniel. According to Kantar Media, the series ruled its timeslot, receiving 42% TV rating for its series finale episode. The series also received a nomination for Best Family Program at the New York Festivals World's Best TV & Film. For her portrayal, she was nominated for Bsst Drama Actress at the PMPC Star Awards for Television. In 2016, Magdayao was introduced as Lucia Cristobal in the season 2 of the drama The Story of Us. The same year, she starred in two films. She played as a communication coach named Billie Pono in the political romantic comedy My CandiDate alongside Derek Ramsay and Iza Calzado. She next played a supporting role in the suspense thriller Dukot. The film was shortlisted by the Film Academy of the Philippines as one of the contenders to represent the Philippines at the Academy Awards. For her performance, Magdayao received her first nomination at the Luna Awards for Best Supporting Actress.

The following year, Magdayao returned to Kapamilya Gold afternoon block through the drama The Better Half. According to Kantar Media, the series registered its highest national TV rating of 18.3% on September 8, 2017, beating its timeslot rival Haplos with only 13.7%. In 2018, Magdayao starred in the action drama Asintado with Julia Montes, Paulo Avelino and Aljur Abrenica. The show drew consistent viewership on throughout its run and achieved its highest TV rating of 19.9% in its finale episode, beating its timeslot rival My Special Tatay with only 11%. For her performance, she received a nomination for Best Drama Supporting Actress at the PMPC Star Awards for Television. The same year, she played Lorena Haniway in Lav Diaz's acclaimed Season of the Devil. Magdayao has represented the film in numerous film festivals around the world such as Tokyo International Film Festival, Berlin International Film Festival, and Festival Internacional de Cine Cartagena de Indias. For her performance, she received a nomination for Best Supporting Actress at the FAMAS Award.

In 2019, Magdayao reunited with director Lauv Diaz in the dystopian drama film The Halt. The film premiered at the Cannes Film Festival on May 22, 2019, and was only one of the two other Asian films selected to compete at the festival. She returned to television through the daytime drama Nang Ngumiti ang Langit. In late 2019, Magdayao starred in the horror series The Haunted with Jake Cuenca and Denise Laurel. According to Kantar Media, the show achieved its highest TV rating of 24%, ahead of its timeslot rival Daig Kayo ng Lola Ko with 21.8%. In 2020, Magdayao reunited with Coco Martin in the action drama Ang Probinsyano, where her role was initially intended as guest but was later extended until the show's finale. The same year, she reprised her role as Gabby in the prequel Four Sisters Before the Wedding in a cameo appearance. In December 2022, Magdayao returned to the musical variety show ASAP after eight years. A mainstay of the show, she had dance segments such as "Supah Dance" and "MASH" with Maja Salvador. Magdayao appeared in two films in 2023. She played as Esmeralda Stuart in Lauv Diaz's Essential Truths of the Lake which premiered at the Locarno International Film Festival in Switzerland. She next played a supporting role in Brillante Mendoza' s Apag. The film competed at the first ever Summer Metro Manila Film Festival. In October 2023, she made a guest appearance in the romantic drama Can't Buy Me Love where she played the mother of Belle Mariano' s character, Divine Almazan.

=== 2024–present: Established actress ===
Magdayao returned to primetime and was cast in the family drama Pamilya Sagrado. As one of the jury of the 23rd New York Asian Film Festival at Film at Lincoln Center, she represented the Philippines as part of the uncaged competition.

== Acting style and reception ==
Often dubbed as the "Empress of Drama" for her acclaimed acting performances across film and television, she has been described by critics as "one of the finest actresses of her generation." Filipino director Joe Carreon praised Magdayao's acting prowess in the film Mga Batang Lansangan... Ngayon. Kathryn Bernardo also praised Magdayao's professionalism in the film Pagpag: Siyam na Buhay, where they both first worked together. Critic Gerry Plaza praised Magdayao's portrayal of an OFW in an episode of Maalaala Mo Kaya, saying: "Shaina Magdayao gave a portrayal that should make you remember her for a long time, a legacy that will place her in a different league among her peers." The success of her daytime soap operas have also earned her the moniker "Kapamilya Gold Queen", among them include Kambal sa Uma (2009), Precious Hearts Romances Presents Alyna (2010), Kung Ako'y Iiwan Mo (2012), The Better Half (2017) and Asintado (2018).

Magdayao was featured in Yes! Magazine's Most Beautiful Stars list in 2007, 2008, 2009, 2010, 2012, 2014, and 2016. Among the products she endorsed include Bench, Coca-Cola, Calayan, Cose Bags and Accessories, Charmee, Freshlook and Ystilo Salon. In 2023, she was chosen as the first celebrity endorser of IVO Water Purifier. Magdayao has also graced the covers of numerous lifestyle, fashion and men magazines such as Cosmopolitan, Metro Magazine, Mega Magazine, Preview Magazine, Candy Magazine, Meg Magazine, Chalk Magazine and Seventeen Magazine. FHM ranked Magdayao at No. 28 in their annual list of the Philippines 100 Sexiest Women in 2008.

== Other activities ==
=== Business ventures ===
In 2020, Magdayao initially launched a bag business "Ultimate Garment Bag" that expanded into a lifestyle brand "Organized Chicas" in 2022. This include shoes, linen dresses, accessories and blazers, and home accessories. She stated that the materials used in their products were locally sourced to show support to Filipino craftmanship.

=== Philanthropy ===
Shaina Magdayao works with diverse NGO's and orphanages such as Hospicio de San Jose and St. Luke Reach Out Foundation. In 2014, using her own funds and donations from her friends in and out of the show-business, she went to remote Typhoon Yolanda-stricken towns and brought relief goods to those who were affected. On her recent trip to Italy in 2015, she stayed in a convent at San Giovanni Rotondo and served children with terminal illnesses.

In 2013, Magdayao joined the PETA campaign, Free Mali. Mali is the only captive elephant in the Philippines; residing at Manila Zoo where she is alone, in a tiny enclosure and in need of adequate care. The campaign focus is to have her moved from the zoo to Boon Lott's Elephant Sanctuary.

== Personal life ==
From 2008 to 2012, Magdayao was romantically involved with high-profile personalities such as actors John Prats and John Lloyd Cruz. In 2024, she also continues romance with Piolo Pascual.

== Acting credits ==
=== Film ===
Key
†	Denotes films that have not yet been released

Shaina Magdayao's film credits with year of release, film titles and roles
Year	Title	Role	Ref.
1995	Campus Girls	Bunny	
1998	Pagdating ng Panahon		
1998	Hiling	Abigail	
1999	Hinahanap-Hanap Kita	Niña	
1999	Wansapanataym: The Movie	Anna	
2000	Tanging Yaman	Carina	
2002	Mga Batang Lansangan Ngayon	Sharmaine	
2002	Ang Agimat: Anting-anting ni Lolo	Jayra	
2003	Ang Tanging Ina	Severina "Seven" Montecillo	
2007	Happy Hearts	Kristine	
2007	Katas ng Saudi	Cathy	
2007	Bahay Kubo: A Pinoy Mano Po!	Rose	
2008	Ang Tanging Ina N'yong Lahat	Severina "Seven" Montecillo	
2009	Villa Estrella	Anna	
2010	Sa 'yo Lamang	Karen	
2010	Shake, Rattle and Roll 12	Ara Federico	
2010	Ang Tanging Ina Mo (Last na 'To!)	Severina "Seven" Montecillo	
2011	Enteng ng Ina Mo	Severina "Seven" Montecillo	
2013	On the Job	Nicky Coronel	
2013	Four Sisters and a Wedding	Gabriella Sophia "Gabbie" Salazar	
2013	Pagpag: Siyam na Buhay	Lucy	
2016	My CandiDate	Billie Pono	
2016	Dukot	Cathy Sandoval	
2018	Ang Panahon ng Halimaw	Lorena Haniway	
2019	The Halt	Haminilda Rios	
2020	Four Sisters Before the Wedding	Gabriella Sophia "Gabbie" Salazar	
2020	Tagpuan	Tanya	
2023	Essential Truths of the Lake	Esmeralda Stuart	
2023	Apag		
2024	Lolo and the Kid	Irma	
TBA	Ang Florante at Laura ni Balagtas †	Laura	

=== Television ===
Key
†	Denotes shows that have not yet been aired

Shaina Magdayao's television credits with year of release, title(s) and role
Year	Title	Role	Notes	Ref.
1996	Lyra	Lyra Monteverde		
1996–1997	Ang TV	Various roles		
1997	Mula sa Puso	Jennifer Matias		
1997–2004	Wansapanataym	Various roles		
1999	Marinella	Rina Fuentes / Angelica Villareal		
2001	Sa Dulo ng Walang Hanggan	young Carmela Estocapio		
2002	Kay Tagal Kang Hinintay	Guinivere "Gwenn" Martinez		
2002	K2BU	Violeta "Bullet" Garcia		
2003	Bida si Mister, Bida si Misis	Shaina		
2003	Ang Tanging Ina	Severina "Seven" Macaspac		
2005	Ikaw ang Lahat sa Akin	Hazel Gerochi-Fontanilla		
2006	Komiks Presents: Agua Bendita	Agua Cristi / Bendita Cristi		
2006	Your Song	Pam Su	Episode: "Cuida"	
2006	Love Spell	Charm	Episode: "Charm & Crystal"	
2006	Star Magic Presents	Yeng	Episode: "My Friend, My Love My Destiny"	
2006	Star Magic Presents	Neri Larazaga	Episode: "Abt Ur Luv"	
2007	Love Spell	Joanne	Episode: "Shoes Ko Po, Shoes Ko 'Day!"	
2007	Rounin	Selene		
2007	Your Song	Maya	Episode: "Break It to Me Gently"	
2008	Lobo	Gabrielle "Gabby" Dizon		
2008	Your Song	Lizzie Valderrama	Episode: "Million Miles Away"	
2008	Komiks Presents: Dragonna	Rona / Olive		
2009	Jim Fernandez's Kambal sa Uma	Vira Mae Ocampo / Marie Perea		
2009	May Bukas Pa	Lea		
2010	Maalaala Mo Kaya	Rox	Episode: "Ketchup"	
2010	Rubi	Maribel Dela Fuente		
2010	Precious Hearts Romances Presents: Alyna	Alyna Natividad		
2011	Maalaala Mo Kaya	Christie	Episode: "Tsinelas"	
2011	100 Days to Heaven	teenage Madam Anna		
2012	Maalaala Mo Kaya	Joyce	Episode: "Sumpak"	
2012	Kung Ako'y Iiwan Mo	Sarah Trinidad		
2012	Maalaala Mo Kaya	Enez	Episode: "Marriage Contract"	
2013	Juan Dela Cruz	Prinsesa Mirathea "Mira"		
2014	Ipaglaban Mo	Shirley	Episode: "Ako ang Biktima"	
2014	Maalaala Mo Kaya	Berna	Episode: "Jeep"	
2015	Maalaala Mo Kaya	Bea	Episode: "Email"	
2015	Nathaniel	Rachel Mercado		
2015	Single/Single (season 1)	Joee		
2016	Single/Single (season 2)	Joee		
2016	The Story of Us	Lucia Cristobal		
2016	Maalaala Mo Kaya	Feliz Lucas	Episode: "Pictures – Courageous Catie"	
2017	The Better Half	Camille Villalobos		
2018	Asintado	Samantha Del Mundo / Katrina Ramirez		
2018	Maalaala Mo Kaya	Sheila	Episode: "Teddy Bear"	
2019	Past, Present, Perfect	Shantal		
2019	Maalaala Mo Kaya	Sarah	Episode: "Tubig"	
2019	Nang Ngumiti ang Langit	Grace Andrada		
2019	The Haunted	Aileen Robles-Sebastian		
2020–2022	FPJ's Ang Probinsyano	P/LtCol. Roxanne Z. Opeña-Basco		
2023	Almost Paradise	Maria Manalo		
2023	Can't Buy Me Love	Divine Almazan		
2024	Pamilya Sagrado	Grace Malonzo		
2024	Good Will	Daphne Montemayor		
2025	Sins of the Father	Atty. Leah Rivera		
2026	My Bespren Emman	Ruth Madriaga		

== Accolades ==
Awards and nominations received by Shaina Magdayao
Award (Note: Awards, festivals, honors and other miscellaneous organizations are listed in alphabetical order.)	Year (Note: Indicates the year of ceremony. Each year is linked to the article about the awards held that year, wherever possible.)	Category	Nominated work	Result	Ref.
Box Office Entertainment Awards	2002	Most Popular Child Actress	Tanging Yaman	Won	
Cinema One Originals Digital Film Festival	2016	Best Actress	Lily	Nominated	
Entertainment Editors' Choice Awards	2021	Best Supporting Actress	Tagpuan	Won	
FAMAS Awards	2000	Best Child Actress	Wansapanataym: The Movie	Nominated	
FAMAS Awards	2001	Best Child Actress	Tanging Yaman	Won	
FAMAS Awards	2011	Best Supporting Actress	Sa 'yo Lamang	Nominated	
FAMAS Awards	2019	Best Supporting Actress	Ang Panahon ng Halimaw	Nominated	
FAMAS Awards	2021	Best Supporting Actress	Tagpuan	Nominated	
Gawad Pasado Awards	2008	Pinakapasadong Kabataan	Herself	Won	
Gawad Pasado Awards	2014	Best Supporting Actress	Four Sisters and a Wedding	Won	
Gawad Pasado Awards	2021	Pinakapasadong Katuwang na Aktres	Tagpuan	Won	
Gawad Tanglaw Awards	2022	Jury Award for Film Acting Excellence	Tagpuan	Won	
Gawad Urian Awards	2021	Best Actress	Tagpuan	Nominated	
Jeepney TV Fan Favorite Awards	2022	Fave Love Affair Triangle	The Better Half	Nominated	
Jeepney TV Fan Favorite Awards	2022	Fave Supporting Actress	—N/a	Nominated	
Luna Awards	2017	Best Supporting Actress	Dukot	Nominated	
Metro Manila Film Festival	2013	Best Supporting Actress	Pagpag: Siyam na Buhay	Nominated	
Metro Manila Film Festival	2020	Best Supporting Actress	Tagpuan	Won	
Parangal ng Bayan	1999	Best Child Performer	Herself	Won	
PMPC Star Awards for Movies	2022	Movie Supporting Actress of the Year	Tagpuan	Won	
PMPC Star Awards for Television	1999	Best New TV Personality	Lyra	Won	
PMPC Star Awards for Television	2008	Best Single Performance by an Actress	Maalaala Mo Kaya: "Telebisyon"	Nominated	
PMPC Star Awards for Television	2015	Best Drama Actress	Nathaniel	Nominated	
PMPC Star Awards for Television	2016	Best Single Performance by an Actress	Maalaala Mo Kaya: "Picture"	Nominated	
PMPC Star Awards for Television	2018	Best Drama Supporting Actress	Asintado	Nominated	
PMPC Star Awards for Television	2019	Best Single Performance by an Actress	Maalaala Mo Kaya: "Tubig"	Nominated	
Star Magical Christmas Ball	2022	Loyalty Award	Herself	Won	
Star Magic Ball	2010	Fashionistas Award	Herself	Won	
Young Critics Circle	2001	Best Performance by Male or Female, Adult or Child, Individual or Ensemble in Leading or Supporting Role	Tanging Yaman	Won	

== Discography ==
Title	Album details
Shaina	Released: 2000; Label: Star Records
