= Angel Aquino on screen and stage =

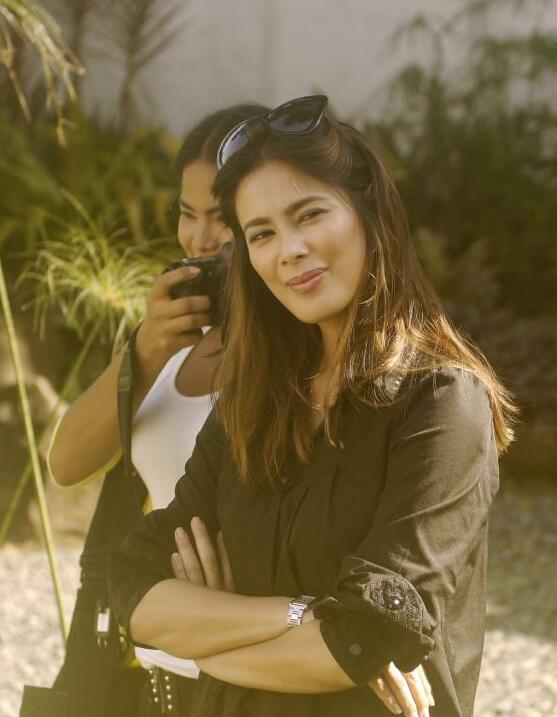
Aquino on the set of Astray in 2012

Filipino actress Angel Aquino has appeared in film, television, and stage productions. She made her screen debut with a minor role in the action drama Mumbaki (1996), and appeared in supporting roles in the dramas Goodbye America (1997), Bata, Bata... Pa'no Ka Ginawa? (1998), and Serafin Geronimo (1998). Her first television appearance was as a presenter of the lifestyle show F! (1999). In 2000, Aquino had her breakthrough in the erotic drama Laro sa Baga, for which she received a Star Award for Best Supporting Actress. She made her stage debut in 2002 with the Folk Arts Theater production of Eve Ensler's play The Vagina Monologues, portraying a Bosnian woman subjected to rape.

Aquino's profile continued to grow in the 2000s as she took on starring roles in two critically acclaimed films. She featured as a professional mourner in Mark Meily's comedy drama Crying Ladies (2003), and played a cancer-stricken woman in Adolfo Alix's drama Donsol (2006). Both films were submissions by the Philippines for the Academy Award for Best International Feature Film at the 77th and 80th Academy Awards, respectively. During this period, she presented the lifestyle magazine show Us Girls (2006), and had minor roles in the fantasy series Etheria (2005), Captain Barbell (2006), and Darna (2009). Aquino received acclaim and an Asian Television Award nomination for her portrayal of a villainous fashion designer in the revenge drama series Magkaribal (2010). In 2012, she took on the lead role in the horror film Amorosa, and starred with Isabelle Huppert in the psychological thriller Captive.

In 2013, she earned two Gawad Urian Award nominations for her roles as a transgender woman in the drama film Porno and a woman desired by a teenage girl in the coming-of-age drama Ang Huling Cha-Cha ni Anita, winning Best Supporting Actress for the latter. That year, she portrayed an assassin's wife in the neo-noir crime thriller On the Job, which was screened at the 2013 Cannes Film Festival. Also in 2013, she returned to the stage in the local production of Patrick Marber's play Closer. For her performance as the main villain in the suspense drama series Apoy sa Dagat (2013), Aquino won the Golden Screen Award for Best Supporting Actress. Two years later, she played a vindictive antagonist in the family drama series And I Love You So (2015). She appeared in Lav Diaz's historical fantasy drama A Lullaby to the Sorrowful Mystery, which won the Silver Bear Alfred Bauer Prize at the 2016 Berlin International Film Festival. In 2017, Aquino portrayed the military intelligence officer Brig. Gen. Diana Olegario in the action drama series Ang Probinsyano. She starred as a gambling-addicted woman who becomes entangled in a murder plot with her family in the revenge drama series Dirty Linen (2023).

== Film ==
Angel Aquino's film credits
Year	Title	Role	Notes	Ref(s)
1996	Mumbaki	Dolores		
1999	Wansapanataym	Sylvia Enriquez		
1997	Goodbye America	Maria Salazar		
1998	Bata, Bata... Pa'no Ka Ginawa?	Elinor		
1998	Serafin Geronimo	Elvira Camandero		
1998	Sana Pag-ibig Na	Karen		
1999	Isusumbong Kita sa Tatay Ko	Alicia Rivera		
2000	Minsan, Minahal Kita	Menchu		
2000	Daddy O, Baby O!	Maribel		
2000	Laro sa Baga	Carmen		
2001	La Vida Rosa	Jing		
2001	Angels	Rich Woman		
2003	Crying Ladies	Choleng		
2004	Beautiful Life	Dolor		
2004	Evolution of a Filipino Family	Rica		
2005	ICU Bed No. 7	Beth		
2006	Ina, Anak, Pamilya	—		
2006	Nasaan si Francis?	Anne		
2006	Summer Heat	Lourdes	Also known as Kaleldo (Note: The film was theatrically released as Kaleldo, but was internationally screened as Summer Heat.)	
2006	Donsol	Teresa		
2006	Ang Pamana: The Inheritance	—		
2007	Faces of Love	Ligaya		
2007	Siquijor: Mystic Island	Doreen Jimenez		
2008	Botelya	Beth		
2008	God Only Knows	Maria	Short film	
2009	Soliloquy	Lilian	Also known as Biyaheng Lupa (Note: The film was theatrically released as Biyaheng Lupa, but was internationally screened as Soliloquy.)	
2009	I Love You, Goodbye	Valerie		
2012	Biktima	Alice de la Cruz		
2012	Amorosa	Rosa		
2012	1945	Puring	Short film	
2012	Captive	Olive Reyes		
2013	On the Job	Lulette		
2013	Ang Huling Cha-Cha ni Anita	Pilar		
2013	Kimmy Dora: Ang Kiyemeng Prequel	Bridget		
2014	Astray	Katie	Short film	
2014	Ibong Adarna: the Pinoy Adventure	Sultana Mabunyi		
2014	Once a Princess	Maritess		
2014	Bawat Sandali	Rosa San Victores		
2015	Old Skool	Pinky		
2016	A Lullaby to the Sorrowful Mystery	Androgynous Tikbalang	Also known as Hele Sa Hiwagang Hapis (Note: The film was screened at the 2016 Berlin International Film Festival as A Lullaby to the Sorrowful Mystery, but was theatrically released as Hele Sa Hiwagang Hapis.)	
2017	Tatlong Bibe	Olive		
2017	Sa Gabing Nanahimik ang mga Kuliglig	Magda		
2018	Glorious	Glory		
2018	Season of the Devil	Anghelita		
2019	Motel Acacia	Angeli		
2019	Akin Ang Korona	Hope		
2019	Kaputol	Maybelle		
2023	A Very Good Girl	Mercedes Novela		
2024	Silig	Sabina	Short film	
2025	Fatherland	Yazmin		
2025	Cinemartyrs	Mother Mary		
2025	April	April	Released in Taiwan as 丟包阿公到我家 (Note: The film was released in Taiwan with the title 丟包阿公到我家.)	
2025	Unmarry	Atty. Grace Agravante		
2026	Until She Remembers	Gloria		
2026	Ganito, Ganyan, Ganoon	Stella	Netflix film	

== Television ==
Key
†	Denotes shows that have not yet been aired

Angel Aquino's television credits with year of release, title(s) and role
Year	Title	Role	Notes	Ref(s)
1999–2006	F!	Herself	Host	
1999	Tabing Ilog	Pia		
2001–2003	Recuerdo de Amor	Cecilia Sebastian		
2004	Hiram	Charlotte Crisostomo		
2004	Marinara	Oceana		
2005	Etheria: Ang Ikalimang Kaharian ng Encantadia	Bathaluman Ether		
2006–2012	Us Girls	Herself	Host	
2006–2007	Captain Barbell	Mrs. B		
2006	Encantadia: Pag-ibig Hanggang Wakas	Bathaluman Ether		
2007	Maalaala Mo Kaya	Sheryl Ramos	Episode: "Bag"	
2007	Tablescape: Life On A Plate	Herself	Host	
2007	Maging Sino Ka Man: Ang Pagbabalik	Andrea		
2008	Iisa Pa Lamang	Young Isadora Castillejos	Guest role	
2008	Lobo	Young Savannah Blancaflor	Guest role	
2008	Maalaala Mo Kaya	Linda	Episode: "Medyas"	
2009	All About Eve	Judith Tebamo		
2009	Darna	Darna / Stonekeeper	Guest role	
2010	Magkaribal	Vera Cruz		
2011	Minsan Lang Kita Iibigin	Teresa Valderosa	Guest role	
2011	Maalaala Mo Kaya	Salvacion "Bogs" Villanueva	Episode: "Tungkod"	
2011–2012	Maria la del Barrio	Victoria Montenegro-Dela Vega		
2012	Wansapanataym	Mrs. Miranda	Episode: "Maan Tukin"	
2012	Maalaala Mo Kaya	Cora	Episode: "Manika"	
2013	Wansapanataym	Mother	Episode: "Si Paolo at Apollo"	
2013	Genesis	Genesis (voice)	Guest role	
2013	Apoy Sa Dagat	Adrianna Lamayre		
2013	Wansapanataym	Lory	Episode: "My Fairy Kasambahay"	
2013–2014	Honesto	Lena Layer		
2014	Ikaw Lamang	Señora Rebecca Del Carmen-Miravelez		
2014–2015	Bagito	Raquel Medina		
2015	Wansapanataym	Divina	Episode: "Yamishita's Treasures"	
2015	Maalaala Mo Kaya	Linda	Episode: "Class Card"	
2015	Maalaala Mo Kaya	Veronica de Guzman	Episode: "Medical Record"	
2015	Wish Ko Lang!	Corazon	Episode: "Lubid"	
2015	All of Me	Rosita Figueras	Guest role	
2015–2016	And I Love You So	Katrina Cervantes		
2016	Maalaala Mo Kaya	Beth	Episode: "Picture"	
2016	Magpakailanman	Marivic	Episode: "My Missing Carrot Man"	
2016	Wansapanataym	Rose	Episode: "Just Got Laki"	
2016–2017	Till I Met You	Valerie "Val/Tita V." Reyes-Valderema		
2017	Maalaala Mo Kaya	Marilou	Episode: "Sto. Niño"	
2018	Maalaala Mo Kaya	Betty	Episode: "Portrait"	
2017–2022	FPJ's Ang Probinsyano	Diana Olegario		
2021	Maalaala Mo Kaya	Vagelyn Tumbaga	Episode: "Singsing"	
2023	Dirty Linen	Feliz Fiero-Pavia		
2023	Fit Check: Confessions of an Ukay Queen	Georgina		
2023	Happy ToGetHer	Angie	Guest role	
2023–2024	Senior High	Tania Mae Cruz		
2024	High Street	Tania Mae Cruz		
2024	How to Spot a Red Flag	Marian "Mars" Valdez		
2025–2026	FPJ's Batang Quiapo	Jackie Guerrero		
2026	My Bespren Emman	Sapphira Villavicencio		

== Stage ==
Year	Production	Role	Venue	Ref(s)
2002	The Vagina Monologues	Bosnian rape victim	Folk Arts Theater	
2013	Closer	Anna	Whitespace Makati	
2026	Lualhati	Jacinta	Tanghalang Ignacio Gimenez (CCP Black Box Theater)	

== Music video ==
Year	Title	Performer(s)	Album	Ref(s)
2010	"Until"	Swan Dive	Until	
2026	"Give Me a Kiss"	Kean Cipriano	Non-album single	

== See also ==
- List of awards and nominations received by Angel Aquino
