= List of awards and nominations received by Angel Aquino =

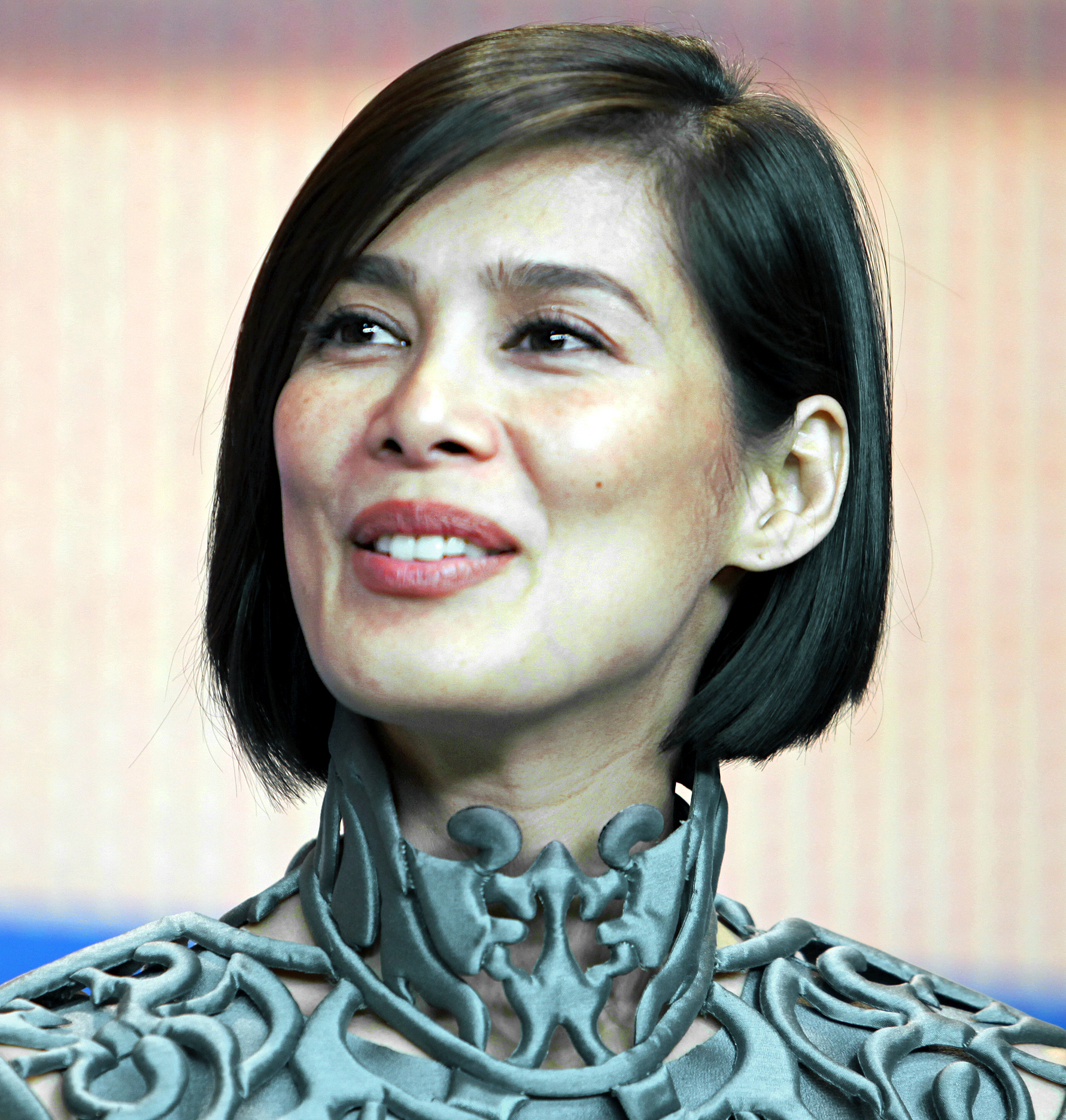
Aquino at the 2016 Berlin International Film Festival

Angel Aquino is a Filipino actress who has received various awards and nominations for her work in film and television. She began her acting career with a supporting role in the action drama Mumbaki (1996). In 1999, she garnered a Gawad Urian Award nomination for Best Supporting Actress for her role in the drama Sana Pag-ibig Na. That same year, she made her first television appearance as a presenter of the lifestyle show F!, for which she received a Star Award for Best Lifestyle Show Host. Aquino won her first Star Award for Best Supporting Actress for her performance in the erotic drama Laro sa Baga (2000). In 2006, she played a cancer-stricken woman in Adolfo Alix Jr.'s drama Donsol, a role that earned her a Best Actress award from the Cinemalaya Philippine Independent Film Festival.

In 2007, she starred in Brillante Mendoza's family drama Summer Heat and was nominated for Best Supporting Actress at the Gawad Urian. That year, she began presenting the magazine lifestyle show Us Girls, which aired for six years. For her work, she received nominations for Best Lifestyle Show Host at the Star Awards ceremonies from 2007 to 2010. Aquino featured as a prominent fashion designer and main antagonist in the revenge drama series Magkaribal (2010), for which she received nominations for the Asian Television Award for Best Supporting Actress and the Star Award for Best Actress in a Drama Series. Aquino was cast in the role of a transgender woman in the independent drama Porno and starred in the coming-of-age drama Ang Huling Cha-Cha ni Anita. Both films earned her nominations for Best Supporting Actress at the 2014 Gawad Urian Awards, with a win for her performance in the latter. She was also awarded the Gawad Tanglaw, Golden Screen Award, and Star Award in the same category.

For her portrayal of an assassin's wife in the neo-noir crime thriller On the Job (2013), Aquino garnered a FAMAS Award nomination for Best Supporting Actress. In the same year, she starred as the main villain in the suspense drama series Apoy sa Dagat (2013), which earned her the Golden Screen Award for Best Supporting Actress in a Drama Series. In 2016, she appeared in an episode of the anthology series Maalaala Mo Kaya and won a Gawad Tanglaw award for Best Single Performance by an Actress in a Drama Program for the role. Aquino's next appearance was in Mac Alejandre's drama Kaputol (2019). The film won the Best Performance Award at the Innuendo International Film Festival for its ensemble cast. For playing a military intelligence officer in the action drama series Ang Probinsyano (2017–2022), she received a Star Award for Best Supporting Actress in a Drama Series nomination.

== Awards and nominations ==
Awards and nominations received by Angel Aquino
| Organizations (Note: Awards, festivals, honors and other miscellaneous organizations are listed in alphabetical order.) | Year (Note: Indicates the year of ceremony. Each year is linked to the article about the awards held that year, wherever possible.) | Recipient(s) | Category | Result | Ref(s). |
|---|---|---|---|---|---|
| Asian Television Awards | 2011 | Magkaribal | Best Supporting Actress | Nominated | |
| Cinemalaya Philippine Independent Film Festival | 2006 | Donsol | Best Actress | Won | |
| FAMAS Awards | 2001 | Laro sa Baga | Best Supporting Actress | Nominated | |
| FAMAS Awards | 2008 | Faces of Love | Best Supporting Actress | Nominated | |
| FAMAS Awards | 2014 | On the Job | Best Supporting Actress | Nominated | |
| Gawad Tanglaw | 2014 | Ang Huling Cha-Cha ni Anita | Best Supporting Actress | Won | |
| Gawad Tanglaw | 2016 | Maalaala Mo Kaya (Episode: "Medical Record") | Best Single Performance by an Actress in a Drama Program | Won | |
| Gawad Urian | 1999 | Sana Pag-ibig Na | Best Supporting Actress | Nominated | |
| Gawad Urian | 2001 | Laro sa Baga | Best Supporting Actress | Nominated | |
| Gawad Urian | 2007 | Summer Heat | Best Supporting Actress | Nominated | |
| Gawad Urian | 2014 | Ang Huling Cha-Cha ni Anita | Best Supporting Actress | Won | |
| Gawad Urian | 2014 | Porno | Best Supporting Actress | Nominated | |
| Golden Screen Awards | 2007 | Donsol | Best Performance by an Actress in a Drama | Nominated | |
| Golden Screen Awards | 2013 | Maalaala Mo Kaya (Episode: "Manika") | Best Single Performance by an Actress in a Drama/Telemovie Program | Nominated | |
| Golden Screen Awards | 2013 | Us Girls | Best Lifestyle Program Host | Nominated | |
| Golden Screen Awards | 2014 | Ang Huling Cha-Cha ni Anita | Best Supporting Actress | Won | |
| Golden Screen Awards | 2014 | Apoy sa Dagat | Best Supporting Actress in a Drama Series | Won | |
| Golden Screen Awards | 2015 | Ikaw Lamang | Best Supporting Actress in a Drama Series | Nominated | |
| Innuendo International Film Festival | 2020 | Kaputol | Best Performance Award (Note: The award is given to a film's ensemble cast, main actors and supporting actors.) | Won | |
| Star Awards for Movies | 2001 | Laro sa Baga | Best Supporting Actress | Won | |
| Star Awards for Movies | 2014 | Ang Huling Cha-Cha ni Anita | Best Supporting Actress | Won | |
| Star Awards for Movies | 2021 | Kaputol | Best Supporting Actress | Nominated | |
| Star Awards for Television | 2002 | F! | Best Lifestyle Show Host | Won (Note: Shared with co-hosts Cher Calvin and Daphne Oseña-Paez) | |
| Star Awards for Television | 2003 | F! | Best Lifestyle Show Host | Won | |
| Star Awards for Television | 2004 | F! | Best Lifestyle Show Host | Won | |
| Star Awards for Television | 2007 | Us Girls | Best Lifestyle Show Host | Nominated | |
| Star Awards for Television | 2008 | Us Girls | Best Lifestyle Show Host | Nominated | |
| Star Awards for Television | 2009 | Us Girls | Best Lifestyle Show Host | Nominated | |
| Star Awards for Television | 2010 | Us Girls | Best Lifestyle Show Host | Nominated | |
| Star Awards for Television | 2011 | Us Girls | Best Lifestyle Show Host | Won (Note: Shared with co-hosts Cheska Garcia and Iya Villania) | |
| Star Awards for Television | 2011 | Magkaribal | Best Drama Actress | Nominated | |
| Star Awards for Television | 2012 | Us Girls | Best Lifestyle Show Host | Nominated | |
| Star Awards for Television | 2012 | Maalaala Mo Kaya (Episode: "Manika") | Best Single Performance by an Actress | Nominated | |
| Star Awards for Television | 2013 | Apoy sa Dagat | Best Drama Supporting Actress | Nominated | |
| Star Awards for Television | 2014 | Ikaw Lamang | Best Drama Supporting Actress | Nominated | |
| Star Awards for Television | 2020 | Ang Probinsyano | Best Drama Supporting Actress | Nominated | |
| Young Critics Circle | 2010 | Biyaheng Lupa | Best Performance by Male or Female, Adult or Child, Individual or Ensemble in Leading or Supporting Role | Nominated | |
| Young Critics Circle | 2014 | Porno | Best Performance by Male or Female, Adult or Child, Individual or Ensemble in Leading or Supporting Role | Nominated | |

== See also ==
- Angel Aquino on screen and stage
