= Angel Aquino =

Filipino actress (born 1973)

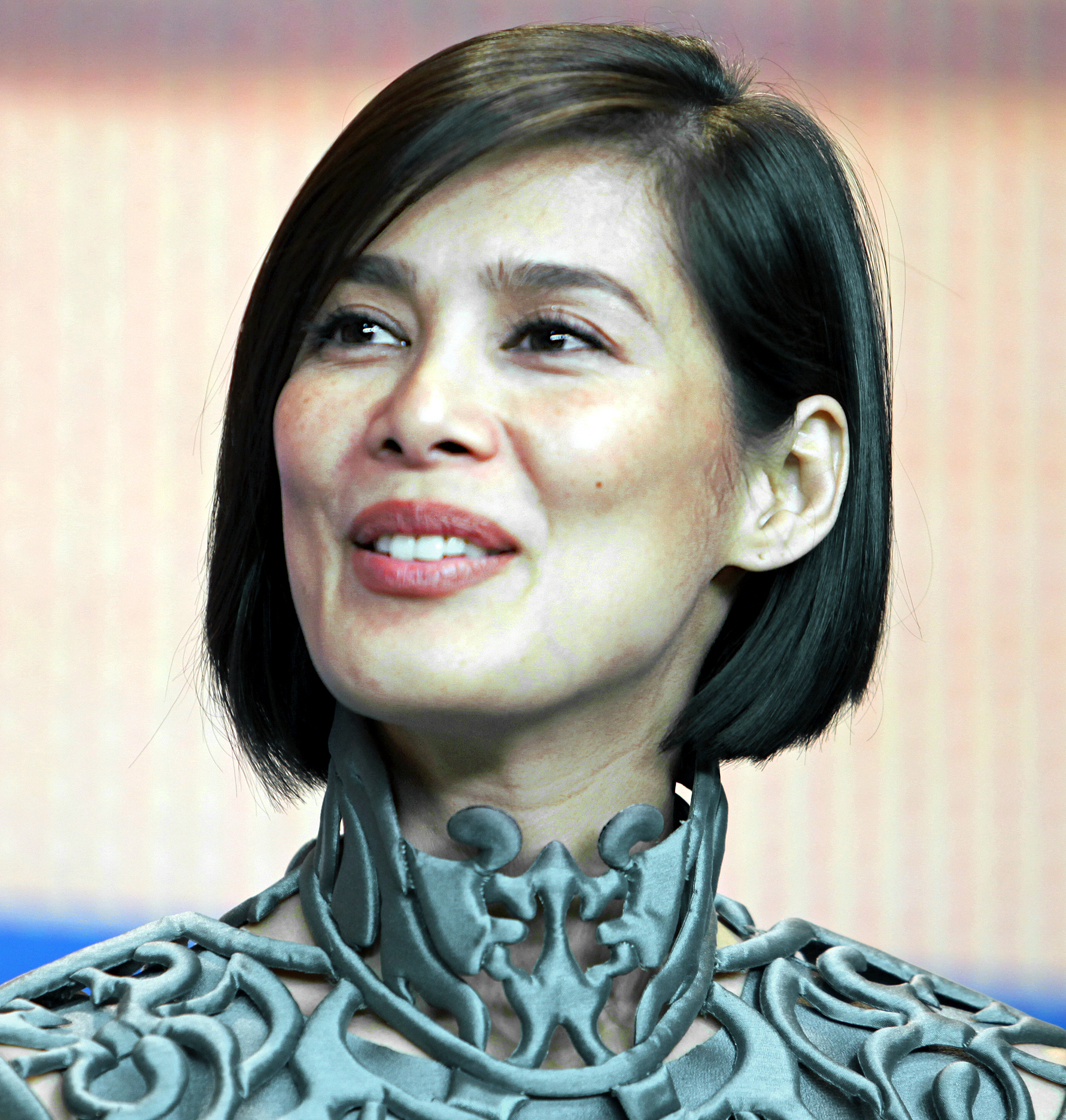
- Aquino at the 2016 Berlin International Film Festival
- Born: Angelita Grace Velasquez Aquino; February 7, 1973 (age 53); Barobo, Surigao del Sur, Philippines
- Education: University of the Philippines Baguio
- Occupations: Actress; model
- Years active: 1996–present
- Works: Full list
- Spouse: Ian Bernardez (m. 1995; ann. 2004)
- Children: 2, including Iana Bernardez
- Awards: Full list

Angelita Grace Velasquez Aquino (born February 7, 1973) is a Filipino actress, fashion model, and television personality. Prominent in independent films, she has also worked on television shows of varying genres, and is known for her versatility and adaptability in portraying protagonists and villains. She has received various accolades, including six Star Awards, two Golden Screen Awards, and a Gawad Urian.

A journalism graduate of the University of the Philippines Baguio, Aquino began her career as a model, before making her film debut with a minor role in the action drama Mumbaki (1996). She made her first television appearance as a presenter of the lifestyle show F! (1999). Her breakthrough came in the erotic drama Laro sa Baga (2000), which earned her a Star Award for Best Supporting Actress. She gained wider recognition for starring in Crying Ladies (2003) and Donsol (2006), which were the Philippine submissions for Best International Feature Film at the Academy Awards. Aquino established herself as a leading actress playing villainous parts in the drama series Magkaribal (2010), Maria la del Barrio (2011), Apoy sa Dagat (2013), And I Love You So (2015), Till I Met You (2016), and Dirty Linen (2023).

Aquino received two Gawad Urian nominations in the same year for her roles as a transgender woman in the drama film Porno (2013) and a woman desired by a teenage girl in the coming-of-age drama Ang Huling Cha-Cha ni Anita (2013), winning Best Supporting Actress for the latter. Among her notable performances are a widowed mother in the horror drama Amorosa (2012), a military intelligence officer in the action series Ang Probinsyano (2017), and a middle-aged woman smitten by a younger man in the erotic romance Glorious (2018).

On stage, Aquino has performed in local theater productions of The Vagina Monologues (2002) and Closer (2013). Described by various media publications as among the most beautiful and finest Filipino actresses of her generation, Aquino has been involved in charitable work and causes, including education, gender equality, and women's rights.

== Early life and background ==
Angelita Grace Velasquez Aquino was born on February 7, 1973, in Barobo, Surigao del Sur, to parents who are natives of Pampanga. The eldest of four children, Aquino and her siblings were raised by their mother in Barangka, Marikina, where she attended elementary school. Reluctant to disclose aspects of her personal life, Aquino has stated that she is estranged from her father who physically abused her mother, his second wife. The family had limited financial means; they lived on income through their mother's home-based food business. As a child, Aquino was involved in her mother's business to help make ends meet. She has said that her mother always made them feel cared for and that she was driven and ingenious.

While attending St. Bridget School in Quezon City, Aquino was a recipient of the Tulong Dunong scholarship funded by the Ateneo Scholarship TD Foundation. After graduating from high school, she enrolled in the University of the Philippines Baguio, initially pursuing a bachelor's degree in mathematics. She struggled academically and decided to switch to the mass communications program, where she majored in journalism. At age nineteen, she was spotted at a shopping mall by filmmaker Jeffrey Jeturian, who arranged for her to audition for talent agents. In 1993, she began a modelling career and worked with designers such as Peter Lim and Jojie Lloren. She was featured in several television and print advertisements for products, and became the face of hair care brand Pantene.

== Career ==
=== 1996–2005: Early roles and breakthrough ===
Aquino began her acting career with a minor role in the action drama Mumbaki (1996), where she was cast as the heiress of a Banaue tribe. She found the experience gratifying and has said that she considered the profession her "true calling". The following year, she featured alongside Corin Nemec, John Newton, and Alexis Arquette in the poorly received military action drama Goodbye America (1997). In 1998, Aquino portrayed a woman who has an affair with a married professor and later develops a relationship with his son in Jeturian's directorial debut, Sana Pag-ibig Na. She then appeared in supporting roles in small-scale features, including Serafin Geronimo: The Criminal of Barrio Concepcion (1998), Bata, Bata... Pa'no Ka Ginawa? (1998), and Isusumbong Kita sa Tatay Ko (1999). In her television debut, Aquino served as one of the presenters for ABS-CBN network's lifestyle magazine show F! (1999), which aired until 2006. She won Best Lifestyle Show Host at the Star Awards for Television for her work. Aquino had a more prominent role in Olivia Lamasan's drama Minsan, Minahal Kita (2000) alongside Sharon Cuneta, Richard Gomez, and Edu Manzano. In the film, she played Gomez's jealous and controlling wife, a role she deemed her first villainous part. Nestor Torre Jr. of the Philippine Daily Inquirer described her portrayal as "merely serviceable", but believed the antagonistic character changed people's perception of her, as she had previously played "sweet-and-lovely roles".

Chito S. Roño cast Aquino as a woman who begins a sexual relationship with her godson in the erotic drama Laro sa Baga (2000), the script of which she found risky but necessary for artistic growth. She considered her part to be challenging and an embodiment of "physical and emotional transformation". The film required her to perform explicit sex scenes, including one in which she had to grab the genitals of co-star Carlos Morales. Aquino's performance garnered critical acclaim; the Philippine Daily Inquirer's Pablo Tariman described her portrayal as "superbly" acted and one of the "most riveting" in the film. Lito Zulueta, also from the Philippine Daily Inquirer, praised her "sensitive" delivery. She won Best Supporting Actress at the Star Awards for Movies. Aquino and Roño reunited in the action drama La Vida Rosa (2001), co-starring Rosanna Roces, Liza Lorena, and Jiro Manio, in which she played a mother whose daughter is abducted by her ex-boyfriend (played by Diether Ocampo). The critic Andrew Paredes of the Manila Standard termed it a "rare local film that stands taller than a Hollywood release" and commended Aquino's "wonderful, understated performance". That year, she starred in the daytime drama series Recuerdo de Amor (2001). In February 2002, Aquino made her stage debut in a Folk Arts Theater production of Eve Ensler's play The Vagina Monologues, portraying a Bosnian woman subjected to rape.

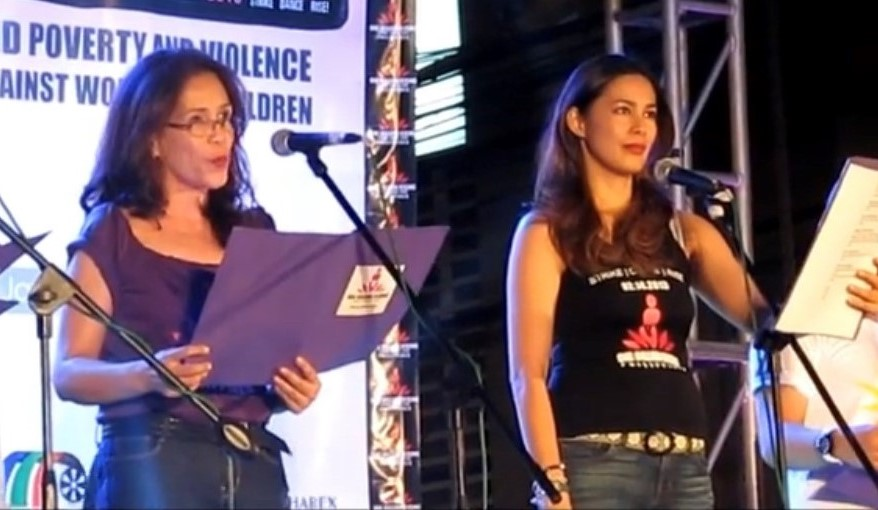
Aquino with Irma Adlawan (left) at a public reading of the 2002 local revival of the play The Vagina Monologues

Following her theater appearance, Aquino featured in Mark Meily's critically acclaimed independent comedy-drama Crying Ladies, co-starring Sharon Cuneta and Hilda Koronel, playing a professional mourner who has an affair with her friend's husband. The film premiered at the 2003 Metro Manila Film Festival, where it won Best Picture. Crying Ladies was screened internationally, including at the Montreal International Film Festival, Brussels Independent Film Festival, and International Film Festival of Kerala. It was submitted for consideration for Best Foreign Language Film at the 77th Academy Awards. Eddie Cockrell from Variety called the film a "vigorous, ambitious, big-hearted comic meller" and credited the ensemble for "comfortabl[y] navigating between broad comedy and legitimate pathos". A. O. Scott of The New York Times, however, thought that Aquino's part was fleeting and "yield[ed] little emotional payoff".

Aquino had four releases in 2004. She appeared in supporting parts in the parody fantasy series Marinara and the drama series Hiram. She next starred as the widow of Raymond Bagatsing's character in Gil Portes's Beautiful Life, a drama about the grief-stricken family members of casualties from a terrorist attack. Aquino's performance was praised by a reviewer from the Philippine Daily Inquirer, who considered her as one of the notable aspects of the production. Her final role of the year was in Evolution of a Filipino Family, a martial law-era experimental drama from Lav Diaz. With a running time of 643 minutes (11 hours), it is among the longest films ever made. In ICU Bed Number 7, an adaptation of the Palanca Award-winning screenplay from writer-director Rica Arevalo, she took on the role of a daughter conflicted with ending the life of her father (played by Eddie Garcia) with terminal illness. Production of the film was completed in five days and it premiered at the 2005 Cinemalaya Independent Film Festival. She was a guest performer in the Encantadia prequel fantasy series Etheria (2005), playing an ancient goddess. Aquino reprised the role in the franchise's final installment Encantadia: Pag-ibig Hanggang Wakas in 2006.

=== 2006–2012: Critical success ===
Set in Sorsogon, the Adolfo Alix-directed independent drama Donsol (2006) featured Aquino and Sid Lucero. The film tells the story of a woman suffering from breast cancer who returns to her hometown and finds companionship with a local whale shark spotter (played by Lucero). Aquino was drawn to her character's subdued and restrained personality, explaining, "It was a role I really wanted to play since it didn't call for a lot of bravura in acting. It was a quiet role which appealed to me". In preparation, she spent time with cancer support groups; and to get into her character's physical and mental space during filming, wore a chest binder and cut her hair short. Philip Cu-Unjieng of The Philippine Star found Aquino to be a "luminous screen presence", while Butch Francisco thought her portrayal was palpable and convincing. She won a Best Actress award at the 2006 Cinemalaya Independent Film Festival. Donsol received critical acclaim and accolades from several international film festival critics' organizations. It was submitted for consideration at the 80th Academy Awards for Best Foreign Language Film.

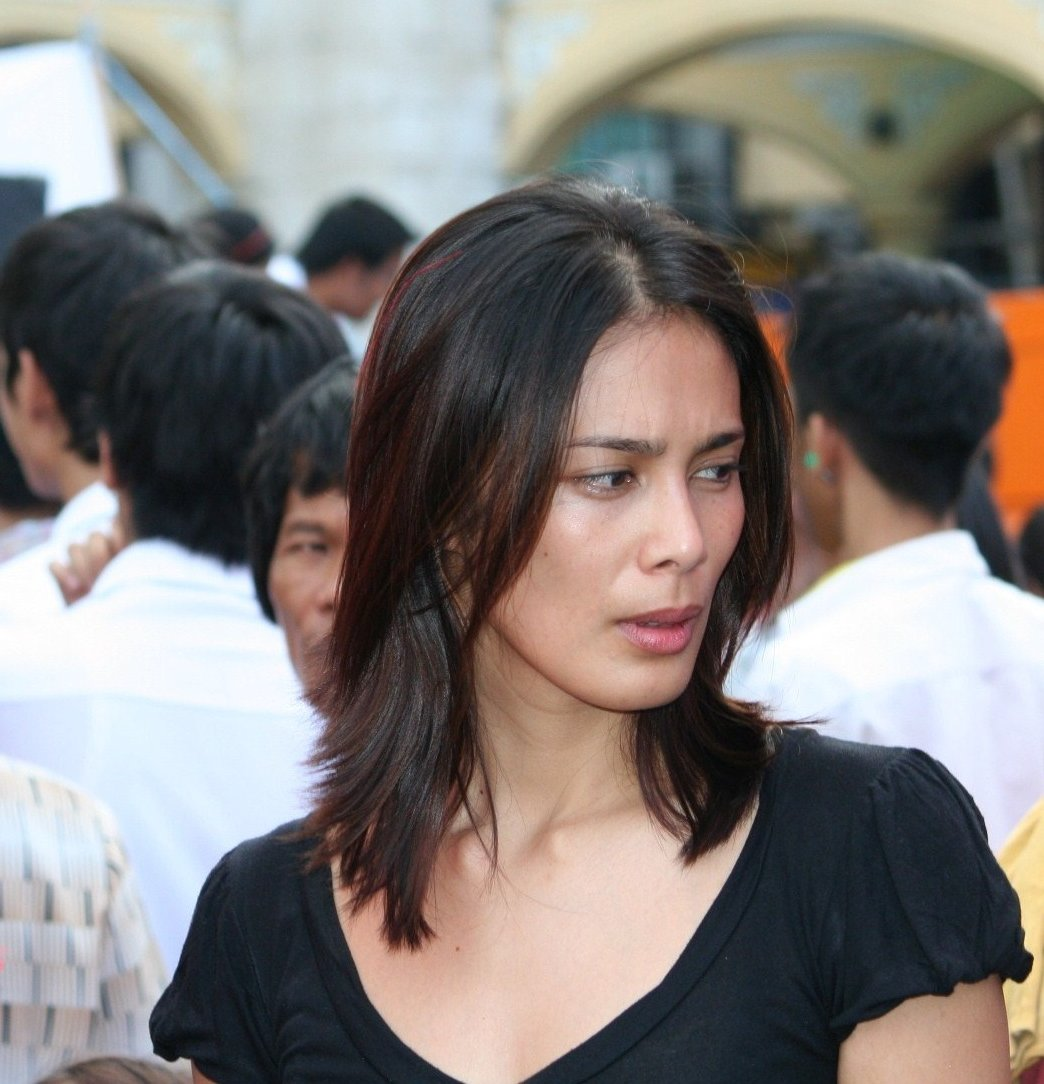
Aquino in character on the set of Botelya in 2008

Aquino next starred alongside Cherry Pie Picache and Juliana Palermo in Brillante Mendoza's drama Summer Heat (2006), about a dysfunctional family with a controlling patriarch (played by Johnny Delgado). She received a Gawad Urian nomination for Best Actress. Her other film appearances in 2006 include Nasaan si Francis?, Ina, Anak, Pamilya, and Ang Pamana: The Inheritance. With Us Girls, Aquino returned as a television presenter for the lifestyle magazine show, which ran for six years. In 2007, Aquino portrayed a woman sending anonymous letters to Christopher de Leon's character in Eddie Romero's final directorial effort, Faces of Love (2007), which premiered at the 2007 Cinemalaya Independent Film Festival. Her next film part was as the television show producer in the supernatural horror Siquijor: Mystic Island, which reunited her with Mendoza. It is about a television crew who visits the island of Siquijor to film a documentary about local myths. That year, she also appeared in several television projects, including an episode of the anthology series Maalaala Mo Kaya, a role in the ensemble drama series Maging Sino Ka Man: Ang Pagbabalik, and as a presenter of the travel and food show Tablescape: Life On A Plate.

In 2008, Aquino starred in the short film God Only Knows directed by Mark Reyes. It was screened at the Asian American International Film Festival and Tribeca International Film Festival in New York City. She also featured in the supernatural fantasy series Lobo as a werewolf's mortal wife. Her next film release came in the Johnson & Johnson-produced family drama Botelya (2008), playing a single mother abandoned by an adulterous spouse. The following year, Aquino had a supporting role in All About Eve (2009), a remake of the eponymous South Korean show, starring Iza Calzado and Sunshine Dizon. The Ravelo Komiks Universe series Darna saw her portray the white stone keeper and original titular superhero, which was subsequently played by Marian Rivera.

To avoid being typecast in roles of martyred wives, Aquino accepted the offer to star as Vera Cruz, a prominent fashion designer and main antagonist, in the revenge drama series Magkaribal (2010). Unlike her previous assignments, the role allowed her to display an intimidating and hysterical personality. Aquino described her interpretation of Cruz as someone "always upset with everyone, always screaming at the top of her lungs", drawing inspiration from Agot Isidro's character in the television series Tayong Dalawa (2009). "They've designed the villainess ... in such a way that they will be sympathetic also, that they will be as real as possible", she said. She found herself challenged by the role and said that working on the project was a "daunting task", though she admitted that her personal experience working in the fashion industry drew her to the part. Her performance received generally positive reviews, with Ricky Lo of The Philippine Star finding Aquino to have "reaffirmed her thespian chops": "Watching Vera Cruz is like riding a roller-coaster of powerful emotions. One minute you hate her, wanting to crush her into pieces ... and the next you sympathize with her". She received a Star Award for Best Actress in a Drama Series nomination, and was also nominated in the Best Supporting Actress category at the Asian Television Awards for the role.

After a brief appearance in the family drama series Minsan Lang Kita Iibigin (2011), Aquino starred in the series remake Maria la del Barrio. As with Magkaribal, her role in the adaptation of the Mexican soap opera of the same name was the main villain. A journalist from The Philippine Star thought the show was compelling and found her portrayal noteworthy. In 2012, Aquino featured in R. D. Alba's dramatic thriller Biktima, portraying a journalist who has post-traumatic stress disorder after being abducted. She then played the lead role of a woman who is forced to care for her two sons after a car accident in the psychological horror Amorosa, directed by Topel Lee. Aquino, who has two children of her own, was drawn to the idea of playing a selfless mother and believed certain aspects of her character's life mirrored her own. The film only received a limited theatrical release. That same year, she co-starred with Isabelle Huppert in Mendoza's psychological thriller Captive. It is a partly fictionalized account of the year-long abduction of civilians by members of the Abu Sayyaf militant groups that began in a private island resort in Palawan. The film was presented at the 2012 Berlin International Film Festival.

=== 2013–2016: Established actress ===
The year 2013 marked a high point in Aquino's career, as she was nominated for two Gawad Urian Awards in the same year. She received a Best Supporting Actress nomination for the coming-of-age drama Ang Huling Cha-Cha ni Anita, in which she played a woman desired by a teenage girl. The director Sigrid Andrea Bernardo wanted Aquino's characterization to be distinctive and unorthodox, and thus asked her to dissociate from traditional portrayals of women she had done in the past. The film was screened at the 2013 CineFilipino Film Festival, and critic Bayani San Diego Jr. of the Philippine Daily Inquirer believed Aquino's supporting role particularly aided the narrative. Her performance won the Best Supporting Actress award from the Gawad Urian, the Star Awards, the Golden Screen Awards, and the Gawad Tanglaw. Her second Gawad Urian nomination that year came from the independent drama Porno, playing a transgender woman with a pornography addiction. Portraying the part proved difficult for Aquino, who found working on the film "nauseating but fulfilling". She added, "Just the idea, it's hard to swallow for me [because I am not a man]". Earl Villanueva of the Philippine Entertainment Portal was enthusiastic about the film's "bold, shocking" production and described Aquino as a stand out: in his opinion, she conveyed a credible quality that her role required.

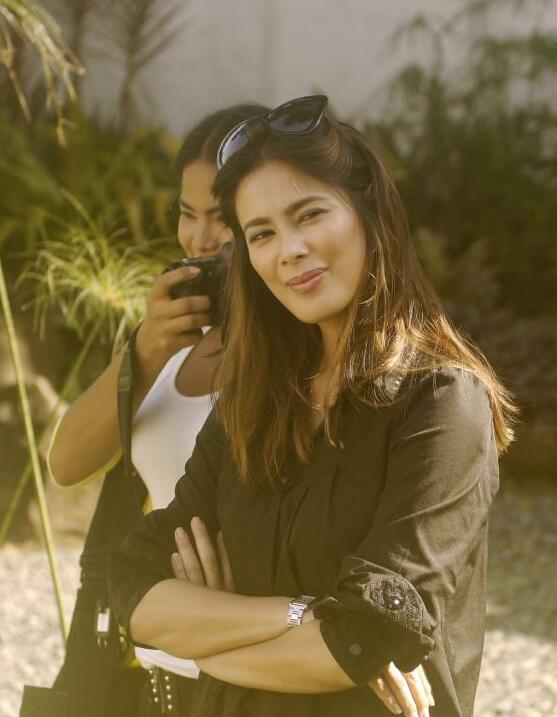
Aquino during principal photography of the short film Astray in 2012

Also in 2013, Aquino again played the antagonist in the suspense drama series Apoy sa Dagat, prompting a journalist for ABS-CBNnews.com to write that she "might be typecast as the perennial villainess after a string of [antagonistic] roles". Aquino asserted that her ventures as a television presenter allowed viewers to see her in a different persona. She won the Golden Screen Award for Best Supporting Actress in a Drama Series and received a Star Award nomination for Best Supporting Actress. Aquino then starred with Joel Torre, Gerald Anderson, and Piolo Pascual in Erik Matti's neo-noir crime thriller On the Job. It tells the story of two hit-man prisoners (Anderson and Torre) who are temporarily freed to carry out political executions. In it, she played the estranged wife of Torre's character, who conceals the nature of her husband's profession from their daughter. The film was presented at the 2013 Cannes Film Festival, and was generally well-received by critics. Aquino returned to the stage in the Red Turnip Theater's revival of Patrick Marber's play Closer. The production, directed by Ana Abad Santos and co-starring Marc Abaya, Cris Villonco, and Bart Guingona, opened in October 2013. Writing for the Philippine Entertainment Portal, Jocelyn Valle criticized Aquino's lack of stage technique: "[She] look[ed] uneasy and tentative, thus compromising what could've been effective and felt performances."

After playing a series of intense roles, Aquino actively looked for a light-hearted part. She found it in the drama series Honesto (2013), which re-teamed her with Torre. Aquino described her character as comical and unpolished: "I am enjoying it so much, my bangs, my colored hair". She began 2014 by appearing in Ikaw Lamang, a period drama series set in a fictional plantation in 1960s Bacolod, in which she played Rebecca Marivelez, a submissive and unhappy wife of a politician. For her performance, Aquino received nominations for Best Supporting Actress at the Golden Screen and Star Award ceremonies. That same year, she starred in Astray, a short film about a lesbian couple. She also had a supporting role in the teen drama series Bagito, starring Nash Aguas and Ella Cruz.

Aquino returned to playing the main antagonist and villain in And I Love You So (2015), a family drama series co-starring Dimples Romana, Julia Barretto, and Miles Ocampo. She portrayed Katrina Cervantes, a woman who abandons her family and later returns to make amends. She was unable to sympathize with Cervantes, as she could neither understand nor respect her character's actions. The critic Maridol Ranoa-Bismark described the show as conventional, but praised Aquino's portrayal, writing that she "shifts from pathetic to furious and back with such passion, you want to let her carry you away in her torrent of emotions again and again". In Diaz's historical fantasy drama A Lullaby to the Sorrowful Mystery (2016), she played a Tikbalang, an androgynous equine-humanoid mythical creature. The Philippine Entertainment Portal's Mari-An Santos lauded Aquino for "seamlessly convey[ing] the scheming character". Paolo Abad from Rappler called the film "mesmerizing" and thought Aquino's role was "eclectic". The film premiered at the 2016 Berlin International Film Festival, where it won the Silver Bear Alfred Bauer Prize. For her next project, she was cast as the antagonist in the romance series Till I Met You, which was filmed in Santorini. John Mark Yap of ABS-CBNnews.com took note of how much Aquino had stood out in her supporting role.

=== 2017–present: Career expansion ===
Aquino next joined the cast of the action drama series Ang Probinsyano (2017), in which she starred as the military intelligence officer Brig. Gen. Diana Olegario. She considered her character as the "strongest, toughest, most courageous woman I had the honor of being", adding that the role helped ingrain morality and patriotism in her. In preparation for the part, she trained in wushu. The show aired until August 2022, and became the longest-running Filipino drama series. Aquino was reluctant to accept the film producer Deo Endrinal's offer to star in the 2018 erotic romance Glorious, but agreed after the director Connie Macatuno convinced her to take the role. It tells the story of a fifty-year-old woman attracted to a younger man (played by Tony Labrusca). She found the script brave, but was nervous about the sex scenes. Aquino, however, took on the challenge to present a positive image for women, saying that "you should never be ashamed of your body or your age". Reviewers for Cosmopolitan Philippines found the film to be "sex-positive", and commended Aquino for being "utterly believable as a smitten middle-aged lady". Jill Tan Radovan of the Philippine Entertainment Portal wrote: "[Aquino] can easily take on challenging roles ... apart from her obvious acting talent, she has the grace and bearing required".

In 2019, Aquino starred with Nar Cabico in the independent film Akin Ang Korona, a comedy that follows the making of a reality television series. She played the show's presenter, and based her character's approach on the journalists Korina Sanchez and Jessica Soho. The film was presented at the 2019 Cinemalaya Independent Film Festival. Mac Alejandre's drama Kaputol was her next release that year. A "film within a film", the production tells the story of an actor (Alfred Vargas) and a film director (Cherie Gil) working to finish a script. In it, Aquino portrayed Gil's same-sex partner. Kaputol received the Best Performance Award at the Innuendo International Film Festival for its ensemble cast.

After a two-year absence on screen, Aquino appeared in two productions in 2021. She had a guest role in an episode of the anthology series Maalaala Mo Kaya, in which she was paired with Adrian Alandy, as high-school classmates who reconnect later as adults. Remarking on her performance, Gerry Plaza of ABS-CBNnews.com wrote that she "stood out with her reverberating intensity, even with a not-so-dramatic character". Aquino then reprised her role in the six-part HBO Go miniseries On the Job, a television sequel of the 2013 film of the same name. It received an International Emmy Award for Best TV Movie or Miniseries nomination. Two years later, Aquino starred as Feliz Fiero in the revenge drama series Dirty Linen (2023). Playing a woman with gambling debt, Aquino's character is the daughter of a wealthy matriarch (played by Tessie Tomas) whose family becomes entangled in a murder plot.

Under Dreamscape Entertainment, Aquino portrayed a villainous fashion designer in the drama series Fit Check: Confessions of an Ukay Queen, which premiered on Amazon Prime Video on July 6, 2023. The following month, she joined the cast of Senior High, an iWantTFC mystery drama series. She played Tanya, a tough but reckless mother to twin daughters Sky and Luna (played by Andrea Brillantes); she loses Luna to suicide but suspects foul play. To prepare for the role of a tattoo artist, Aquino dyed her hair purple and applied decorative ink on her upper and lower limbs. "One of her biggest strengths is her versatility", wrote ABS-CBNnews.com critic Liezel dela Cruz, "which allows her to play pretty much any character in any genre ... far different from her other recent portrayals, proving time and again that she can do it all". Aquino then took on a brief role in Petersen Vargas's dark comedy A Very Good Girl, featuring Kathryn Bernardo and Dolly de Leon. The sequel series High Street (2024) featured her reprising the role of Tanya from Senior High.

Following her work in television, Aquino returned to international cinema in the 2026 Taiwanese-Filipino co-production April (also known as 丟包阿公到我家), directed by Freddy Tang. In the film, she portrayed a migrant worker who is forced to return to the Philippines while caring for an elderly Taiwanese man suffering from dementia. To authentically capture the role, Aquino had to learn and speak Hakka, a Taiwanese dialect. April served as the Centerpiece film for the 20th Asian Pop-Up Cinema festival in Chicago, where it made its North American premiere. During the event on April 2, 2026, Aquino was honored with the Pinnacle Career Achievement Award. The award was presented by the Philippine Consul General in Chicago, recognizing her acclaimed performance as well as her extensive three-decade career in film and television.

== Reception and acting style ==
"It's not easy playing a role and being someone else. And thinking their thoughts and speaking their words. It's not your own personality. It's hard especially when I do dramatic roles ... I'm a very internal person. I keep things bottled in."

— Aquino on acting

Aquino has been regarded by the media as one of the finest Filipino actresses of her generation. She enjoys the variety of starring in both independent and mainstream productions. Having appeared in numerous films and television series, Don Jaucian of The Philippine Star believes that Aquino "belongs to an elite league of character actors of Philippine cinema who has graced both the biggest teleseryes and the most acclaimed Filipino films of all time". In 2006, Amy Cortez of The Manila Times observed that early in her career, Aquino had a preference for "meatier roles from independent filmmakers rather than take on insignificant offers from mainstream producers". On her decision, the actress argued that studio films "do a lot of stereo-typing and formula-based decisions", adding that "[they] thrive on the star system that is prevalent in the industry". She later emerged as "one of the most reliable and sought after personalities in showbiz" after starring in several successful film and television projects. Described by the Philippine Entertainment Portal to be among the "busiest actresses", Aquino is noted for appearing in material of varying genres. Eli Montoro of Metro credited her for being an "actress whose character portrayals exceed expectations". The director Peque Gallaga has identified her as a notable figure in the "golden age of cinema".

Aquino is particularly known for her versatility and adaptability in playing protagonists and antagonists. She specializes in portraying emotionally grueling villainous characters, as well as submissive women who suppress powerful emotions. Fiel Estrella of CNN Philippines wrote that her antagonistic roles are "something she can pull off with her signature grace and the right amount of unexpected menace", and identified a theme of characters that embody "humanity, redemption, [and] goodness". The journalist Ricky Lo of The Philippine Star associates Aquino with persuasion, writing, "Her performance is so convincing that she can even play with your emotions. You want to pummel her when she's bad, but then you also want to cry with her when she's at her lowest. She's so good that she can manipulate your feelings." Aquino has commented that physicalizing and internalizing as part of her acting is a technique she views as an obvious requirement in her portrayals. When questioned as to how she personifies the vileness of her character, she remarked: "I have to stand up straighter, I have to put my chin up, I have to look proud and ready to eat someone alive". Media publications such as Preview and Rappler have included Aquino on their list of notable Filipino villains.

Tony Labrusca, her co-star in Glorious, considers her to be a "grounded" actress, and said that she has always remained "calm and collected" on set. Her Ang Huling Cha-Cha ni Anita director Sigrid Andrea Bernardo recalled that Aquino was "humble and treats her fellow actors with utmost respect", and has identified a willingness in "redefining her screen persona" by detaching herself "from her usual mainstream roles". Ruel Bayani, who directed Aquino in a 2007 episode of Maalaala Mo Kaya, described her as "one hell of a competent actress", and Jane de Leon, with whom she worked with in Ang Probinsyano, praised her talent and work ethic.

In a 2019 interview, Aquino stated she did not study acting. She has said she bases her acting approach on her observations of people around her, learning from collaborations with co-actors: "I did not take any workshops or seminars ... I was just observing people and I was just taking advice from my mentors". Aquino has named Cherie Gil and Sharon Cuneta as two of her favorite and most influential actresses. She considers Gil as her inspiration in playing antagonists. "She was really my benchmark, my peg", she said, "I can never be her ... but somehow, I guess the nuances ... especially when I was starting were inspired by [her]". On a performance that stayed with her the most, Aquino highlighted being incredibly moved by Cuneta's acting while filming a scene in Ang Probinsyano, adding that there was something raw and powerful about it.

Aquino's public image is strongly tied to her perceived beauty and sex appeal. She has been cited as one of the most beautiful faces in the Philippine entertainment industry by many sources. In 2006, she was named by the Philippine edition of Marie Claire as one of its woman of the world honorees. Aquino has appeared in Yes! magazine's annual beauty list in 2014 and 2015. The Philippine Star emphasized that her most recognizable physical features are her "exquisite facial bone structure ... svelte figure .... olive skin and long legs".

== Philanthropy and activism ==
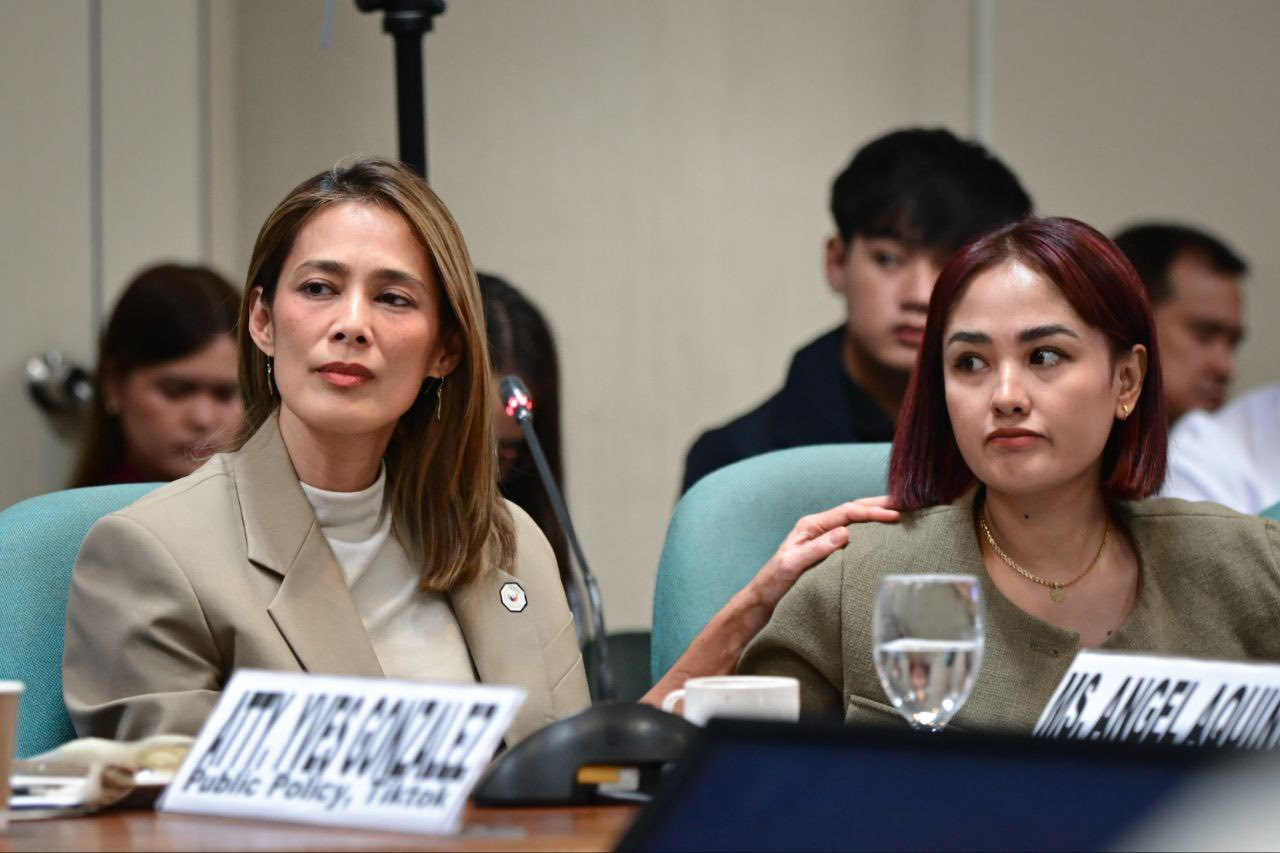
Aquino (left) testifies before the Senate Committee on Women, Children, Family Relations and Gender Equality in 2025

Aquino supports various causes and charitable organizations. She has advocated for children's education and is actively involved with Juan Day, an initiative which raises money to help provide educational supplies to students in rural areas and from disadvantaged families. A vocal supporter of women's rights and gender equality, Aquino has fronted a campaign against domestic violence. She collaborated with ABS-CBN News Channel and the Commission on Human Rights Philippines for Kinse, a program that showcased a collection of short films exploring all forms of human rights violations. In 2012, she advocated for LGBT rights and participated in the "I dare to care about equality" movement by Bahaghari Philippines in support of the International Day Against Homophobia, Biphobia and Transphobia. Aquino has also voiced her approval for equal rights and opportunities for the LGBT community, stating, "Respect for every human being. It's all about individual rights and freedom. At the end of the day, we're all spirits finding our own space in the sun." In September 2025, she appeared before the Senate Committee on Women, Children, Family Relations and Gender Equality to disclose that she had been a victim of a deepfake pornographic video. Aquino described it as a form of violence against women and urged authorities to strengthen legal measures against perpetrators, platforms, and distributors of such content.

== Personal life ==
Aquino was in a relationship with Ian Bernardez, whom she met while attending the University of the Philippines Baguio. The couple married in 1995 and have two daughters, including actress and film producer Iana Bernardez. The family lived in Baguio for a time, during which Aquino was completing her degree and filming Mumbaki. Their marriage was annulled after nine years in 2004. In 2007, Aquino began dating actor and television presenter Lui Villaruz after they had met while filming a segment for the latter's show Magandang Umaga, Pilipinas. The relationship ended in February 2011.

In a September 2025 interview with Bilyonaryo News Channel's The Daily Dish, Aquino revealed her bisexuality, saying that she "falls in love with girls and women".

== Acting credits and awards ==
According to the online portal Box Office Mojo and the review aggregate site Rotten Tomatoes, Aquino's most critically and commercially successful films include Lea's Story, Crying Ladies, Siquijor: Mystic Island, Amorosa, Captive, and On the Job. Her television projects include the primetime series Magkaribal, Maria la del Barrio, Apoy Sa Dagat, Honesto, Ikaw Lamang, Bagito, And I Love You So, Till I Met You, Ang Probinsyano, and Dirty Linen.

Throughout her career, Aquino has received many accolades for her work in film and television. She received a Star Award for Best Supporting Actress for her performances in Laro sa Baga and Ang Huling Cha-Cha ni Anita. For the latter film, she was also awarded the Gawad Urian, Gawad Tanglaw, Golden Screen, and Star Award in the same category. In addition, for her role in the television series Apoy sa Dagat, she was awarded a Golden Screen Award for Best Supporting Actress. She has received double nominations at the Gawad Urian Awards in the same year, similar to performers such as John Lloyd Cruz, Anne Curtis, and Eddie Garcia.

== See also ==
- Cinema of the Philippines
- List of Filipino actresses
- Television in the Philippines
