= List of Magkaribal episodes =

The following is a list of episodes of Magkaribal which premiered on June 28 and ended on November 5, 2010.

== Episodes ==
Chapter	Title	Original release date
1	"The Unveiling"	June 28, 2010 - July 2, 2010
Sisters Anna (Kathryn Bernardo) and Angela (Barbie Sabino) realize that their family can no longer be together after their father (James Blanco) leaves them for a Filipino-Italian model, Vera (Alessandra De Rossi), and their mother dies after getting hit by a car. Both are forced to be squatters. Soon Angela gets food poisoning forcing Anna, then 16 years old, to sell her body in order to afford the expensive medicine. However, when she finally comes back to the hospital, she finds it aflame, and the sisters are separated. Fortunately, Angela escapes from the hospital, but she is captured by a syndicate who abuses kids and use them to beg for money. Meanwhile, Anna gets adopted by a wealthy man named Ronaldo, who becomes her foster parent and changes her name to Victoria Valera. Angela soon escapes from the syndicates, but is forced to leave behind her friend Dos (Nash Aguas) and she was taken in by Hermes who treats her as if she is their own child though her step-mother Sonia (Arlene Muhlach) treats her as a maid. Her new name, thanks to her father, is Gelai Agustin. After Gelai (Bea Alonzo) meets her fashion idol Vera (Angel Aquino) in her first ever fashion shoot with her best friend Caloy (Enchong Dee) she soon is on her way to making her dream reality as she applies for a job at Vera Couture as a designer. However, she wasn't accepted due to her unfinished design. Victoria (Gretchen Barretto) and her foster father migrate back to the Philippines from Paris and she intends to be the new fashion queen of the Philippines replacing Vera, the woman she blames for her family falling apart.
2	"The Tug-Of-War"	July 5, 2010 - July 14, 2010
Vera panics when Victoria plans to replace her as the new fashion queen. After Victoria replaces Vera's billboard sign, Vera's had enough, and she tries to harm Victoria by bumping her with her car. Meanwhile, Gelai loses her temper because of Vera stealing her fashion ideas, and at the same event, Gelai inadvertently saves her long-lost sister from the incident although they do not recognize each other. Victoria uses Gelai to ruin Vera's name and invites Gelai to her welcome-back party. Victoria tells Gelai to tell the truth in front of all of Vera's employees and sponsors that Vera the president of FDPG stole a Gelai Agustin's sketches. Gelai gets really confused and gets angry with both of them - Victoria and Vera saying that 'manggagamit lang kayong lahat!' (Lit. You're all just users!) Gelai leaves the party. Meanwhile, Victoria goes with Louie - a guy whom she met in Hong Kong three years ago. Manuel (Mark Gil), Gelai's biological father, visits Gelai's house, but only finds her foster dad and tells him that he's offering Gelai a job at Vera Couture which Gelai soon accepts. Gelai receives her first task and that is to design and create a dress for a socialite even though Vera has no plans to use her dress. But as her deadline is right after the day she gets the task, she spends all of her time working on it. After Vera's assistant discovers that Victoria also has a dirty-little-secret -- that she is still together with her rumored boxer-boyfriend, Louie (Derek Ramsay). Caloy (Enchong Dee) and Chloe (Erich Gonzales) try to help Gelai with her first assignment, but later Vera tells them to repeat it because it's too colorful and 'baduy' (Lit. lame/tacky). Fortunately for Gelai, Vera's crew likes Gelai's design better which forces Vera to choose it as the 'finale dress'. After the model that was supposed to wear Gelai's design backs out due to Victoria's manipulations, Gelai is forced to wear the dress in the fashion show, but the dress goes missing. Vera shouts at Gelai to find the dress knowing all along that she had one of her employees hide the dress. Eventually, Manuel finds the dress, and Gelai models her creation. At the end of her walk, Chloe sees Caloy and they try to tell Gelai that Sonia is in the hospital. Disobeying Vera's command to stay on the stage or get fired, Gelai runs after Caloy. With no taxis in sight, she finds Louie on his motorcycle, embarrassed after Victoria claimed to not know him on the catwalk, and gets him to drive her to the hospital.
3	"The Great Fight"	July 15, 2010 - July 28, 2010
Gelai finally arrives to the hospital where she finds her mother, Sonia. Although she has always felt jealousy stemming from Gelai's relationship with Hermes, she finally sees how much Gelai loves her, and she makes amends. Louie tries to apologize for showing up to the fashion show unannounced even though it was Vera's plan to humiliate Victoria. Vera tells Gelai that she is fired, but Manuel tells her that she's not and that she's staying because their company, Vera Couture, is losing money and sponsors, and they need Gelai's talent to raise their company up again. In order to get their products in entrepreneur Alexander Jacobs' stores worldwide, Vera and Victoria try to one up each other in order to impress him. When Gelai suggests to Vera to have an event melding fashion and URCC, Vera scoffs at the idea. But when she realizes that these two things are Alexander's passions, she sets out to create "The Great Fight" with one condition: Alexander's favorite fighter, Markado, must be the main event. Vera promises to get Markado not knowing that Markado is really Louie. Gelai volunteers to convince Markado to fight because Caloy works out at the same gym while Chloe decides she wants to handle the project. However, when Markado realizes that the fight is a Vera Couture event, he decides to renege on his contract and runs away to his home in the countryside. With pressure from Vera and a need to support her family after her mother's hospitalization, Gelai soon follows. Gelai and Markado share a spicy rapport, and even the local townspeople can see that they have chemistry with each other especially following a drunken dance. But after a few days, Gelai understands why Markado doesn't want to fight so she decides to leave. However, Markado also understands that even though his participation in the fight might make Victoria even angrier, he needs to do it for himself. He jumps on his motorcycle to follow Gelai. When he comes upon Gelai on the side of the road after her bus back to Manila breaks down, they realize that they'll never make it to the event in time. After a call to Vera, they arrive to the venue via helicopter just in time. When they emerge, Caloy is crestfallen when he sees Gelai and Louie holding hands. Unknown to Vera, Chloe invited Victoria to witness 'The Great Fight.' Louie wins the fight, but Victoria stepped out because she can't bear to see him lose this way and later overhears a conversation from two ladies that it was Gelai who invited him over to participate in the fight. After the fight, Louie tried to propose to Victoria, but she refused. Later on, a rejected Louie, along with Gelai, went somewhere to celebrate his victory along with his supporters and coach. On the other hand, Victoria admits to Alexander Jacobs that Vera Couture is struggling financially. Vera was looking forward to signing a deal with Mr. Jacobs when he walked in and told her about her company struggling then leaves, leaving Vera disappointed. Vera then confronts Victoria as she is about to go in the elevator and leave. The two were fighting until Ronaldo and Manuel stopped it, resulting in Vera knocked to the floor by Manuel. Vera realizes that Manuel is protecting his daughter Victoria (Anna) and decides to have some alone time. Louie tried to propose again to Victoria, by sending the engagement ring through the mail, but it gets returned to him, leaving him disappointed. Manuel goes to Victoria's house to apologize for all the pain he caused years ago. She would forgive him only if he leaves Vera for good. Later, Vera and Manuel reconcile. After struggling financially and personally, Vera decides to give up her position as President of FDGP (upon some advice from Manuel) to Victoria. Victoria seems half pleased because she thinks Vera could be up to something.
4	"The Special Day"	July 29, 2010 - August 4, 2010
It's Gelai's birthday and she is celebrating it with her foster parents and friends at an orphanage. Gigi sees Louie going into Gelai's house and later brings him over to the party. Caloy isn't sure if he wants to go to the party and he goes anyway by the time Gelai was about to blow out the candles on her birthday cake, which was carried by Louie. Later on, a lady tells Gelai regarding her long lost sister and that they're close to finding her. A few days later, there was a list on one of the ladies' desks with information on Gelai's sister. As Hermes was about to arrive there, the list was scattered onto the floor and one of the kids used it as a paper airplane. Meanwhile, Manuel admits to Chloe that Victoria is his daughter, resulting in Chloe confronting Victoria at her house and calling her an evil person. Gelai and Louie noticed Victoria and Christian together at a mall talking about taking over Vera's company. Later, she sees Christian and Manuel going into the boardroom for a meeting to transfer 18% of the shares to Christian, making him the manager of the Abella Group of Companies. As Manuel was about to sign the papers, Chloe and Gelai stopped them and Gelai told Manuel about Christian's meeting with Victoria. Manuel and Vera realized that it was Victoria's plan to take over the company and not Christian. On the other hand, Vera tries to find an alternate plan to not let Victoria take over. She meets with a guy named Paul, who's an artist. He's interested in investing in her company and to make sure he does, he asks Vera to sleep with him. Vera gets offended by this and leaves, making her and Manuel decide to let Victoria take over the company.
5	"The Take Over"	August 5, 2010 - August 16, 2010
Victoria officially takes over Vera's company and a lot of changes took into effect, from the designs to renaming Vera Couture. She takes over the creative director position and begins to criticize Gelai's designs and later tells her to design a dress for her upcoming 'V Launch.' After having some advice from Manuel, Gelai makes the dress by using a flashback when her mom used to make an outfit for her and her older sister. She later shows it to Victoria, but calls the dress disgusting and tells Gelai to design another one. Gelai is still searching for her long lost sister and begins to fall for Louie and she admits that she has mixed feelings for both Caloy and Louie and wants some time alone. Seeing that Gelai is frequently with Louie, Caloy fights in an underground boxing warehouse and begins to get jealous of Louie. It has been revealed that Louie's mother abandoned him when he was young prior to getting kidnapped by the beggars. On the other hand, Chloe resigns from Victoria's company and accuses her of hurting her parents. Meanwhile, Vera is curious to know if Gelai is really Angela and takes a hair sample from Gelai's hairbrush for DNA testing. She later receives the DNA result and it turns out that Gelai is in fact Angela.
6	"The V Label"	August 17, 2010 - August 31, 2010
Victoria notices that Gelai and Louie are together and gets upset when the two were about to kiss. She later goes to a bar and begins to get ghostly visions of Louie as she's dancing with a guy named Nick and it continues till she gets a ride home by Ronaldo. Meanwhile, Caloy says to Gelai that she has changed ever since Louie entered the picture and gets slapped by her. Feeling frustrated over Gelai, Caloy goes to the underground boxing warehouse and Chloe follows him there to stop him from fighting. The next day, Chloe tells Gelai about Caloy fighting in the underground and wants her help. Gelai later asks Louie for help with the situation before she was promoted as Victoria's assistant during a meeting. Caloy gets beaten up badly and Chloe, Louie, and Gelai try to stop him from continuing to fight. Later, the police raided the underground and Chloe and Gelai agree to help bail out Louie and Caloy, who were arrested. At the FDGP meeting, Vera gets fired by Victoria and tells Manuel to talk to Victoria. Manuel tries to convince Victoria to rehire her, but fails. Seeing Manuel cannot help her to get her job back, Vera decides to move into a hotel and Manuel and Chloe try to encourage her to return home. Chloe takes an interest in photography and meets Neil (Marc Abaya), one of her photographer idols and later gets hired after impressing him by showing photos of Manuel from her photo assignment. She continues to hang out with Caloy frequently and seems to like him. Meanwhile, Caloy gets some information from his mother and later visits her, along with Chloe, and wanted to know why she abandoned him when he was young. Vera eventually returns home and notices that Chloe and Caloy were about to kiss and immediately separates the two apart. Gelai begins to get torn between Victoria and Louie. After having some advice from Manuel, she admits to Louie that she's in love with him and they share their first kiss. As Gelai was making a dress for Victoria for the upcoming 'V Launch,' she admits to Manuel about her long lost sister Anna, leaving him to discover that Gelai could be Angela. Later, Gelai accidentally drops her mother's diary as she was leaving and Manuel picks it up, feeling more suspicious. Program Note: The show was pre-empted on August 23, 2010 due to ABS-CBN's Special News Coverage of the Manila hostage crisis. As a result, episode 41 was shown the following day.
7	"The Funeral"	September 1, 2010 - September 13, 2010
Victoria has a party for the 'V Label' launch and during the party, Vera sees Chloe and Caloy together and separates the two once again. Manuel was on his way to the party and finds the DNA result that Gelai was his other daughter and later confronts Vera about it. Vera then goes up to the roof to try to commit suicide by jumping off a building around the same time as Gelai and Chloe, who were lashing their anger at Victoria and Vera there. Gelai then tries to persuade Vera not to kill herself while Chloe gets Manuel for help. Vera eventually holds Gelai's hand, but suddenly, they almost fell, clinging for dear life. A few FDGP members noticed the situation unfolding and went back inside to tell everyone. Manuel then arrives and saves Vera first, followed by Gelai. As Victoria and the entourage were making their way to the roof, they heard someone scream. It turns out that Manuel fell off the building after saving Gelai and Chloe was screaming. Manuel was then rushed to the hospital then the doctor gave them the bad news. Because of the fall, he broke a rib and fractured his lungs and was pronounced dead when they tried to save him. The death of Manuel left everyone in grief and tensions continue between Victoria and Vera during the funeral, Victoria is persuaded by Ronaldo to go to his wake. As she went to the church with him, Vera rejected her condolences and gets enraged at her audacity and tried to push her and force her to kiss Manuel. Everyone is shocked at Victoria’s humiliation caused by Vera. Victoria cries and walks home with Ronaldo miserably. Vera seizes the opportunity to reject the flowers that Victoria brings at Manuel’s wake. After Manuel was laid to rest, almost all the co-workers blame Gelai for Manuel's death. Gelai is having mixed feelings when she sees Louie with Victoria. At Vera's house, Vera and Chloe met with the lawyer regarding Manuel's last testament and will, but in order to read the will, they need Victoria to come over. Vera gets shocked when Manuel's will revealed that there was nothing left at all and only the house for her, Chloe, and Victoria. While packing Manuel's stuff, Gelai discovers her mother's diary and Victoria warns her not to mix her stuff with the company's. Later, Victoria has a dinner with the FDGP to celebrate the success of her V Label, which actually is beginning to struggle and later admits to the FDGP regarding her problems with Vera. The FDGP seemed surprised by Victoria's behaviour lately and tells Ronaldo, who later confronts her after the dinner and then leaves angrily upset. Meanwhile, Vera sells some of the furniture to earn some money and later passes out after having an imagination with Manuel by her side. On the other hand, Caloy tries to cheer up Chloe and his mother tries to speak to him once again.
8	"The Deception"	September 14, 2010 - September 17, 2010
Victoria tries to find or contact Ronaldo, but fails and later goes to Louie, where they had sex. The next day, she confesses her love to him, but Louie won't accept her feelings because he's in love with Gelai. After Victoria leaves, Gelai visits him by giving him a dish and then the two sleep together. Later, Gelai discovers the scar on Louie's back that he is Dos and the two are happily reunited. When Gelai reports for work, Victoria is upset that she is late and later fires her. She even gives Gelai a hard time when she tried to find another job. Sonia overhears Gelai's conversation with Hermes and later confronts Victoria. Gelai arrives later to stop Sonia, then confronts Victoria until Sonia collapses and ends up in the hospital. Later, Gelai enters a contest for a magazine with Gigi as her model. The judges think that Gelai is the clear winner, but Victoria opposes. Meanwhile, Vera plans to sell the house and Chloe gets upset about it, causing her to leave Vera behind and to live with Caloy. Vera later visits her, with Caloy, and warns her that her life would be difficult if she continues to live with him. Chloe is given an opportunity to do photography in Spain, through a scholarship, but Caloy seems down that Chloe might go. Caloy finds out the reason why his mom needed to see him and it turns out that his she is sick. Louie is given an offer by Alexander Jacobs to pursue boxing in the United States.
9	"The Makeover"	September 20, 2010 - September 22, 2010
Gelai is declared the winner of the contest and Louie is proud of her and he later leaves for America while Gelai celebrates her victory with her family and friends. Vera gets a visit by a few policemen regarding a smuggling scheme and they go through her belongings. The next day, she runs away when she owes the owners the rent and a mystery person offers her hand, which turns out to be Paul. A guy named Mark meets with Gelai at a restaurant and hands her the papers to inaugurate her fashion line and open her shop. Chloe gets a heartbreaking letter from Caloy stating that he has to go to America with his mother and cries miserably. Few months have gone by and Ronaldo returns home after visiting family. Louie returns from America, and Chloe returns from Spain, now in a relationship with Neil. Gelai sees Vera on the streets and later offers her a position as a creative expert. Chloe invites Gelai to her exhibition, but is surprised that Vera is there and still resents her. Victoria is delighted that Ronaldo has returned and suddenly, she almost faints while driving. A doctor checks her condition and Victoria is actually pregnant with Louie's child. Gelai lives in a new house and is delighted that Louie is back and proposes to her. Victoria is desperate to tell Louie about her pregnancy, but Louie wants to leave her for good and plans to marry Gelai. Paul tells Vera about Victoria's pregnancy, from the doctor who checked on her. The next day, Vera notices Gelai vomiting and gives her a pregnancy test, but it turns out negative. Victoria finally confronts Louie and tells him about her pregnancy and forces him to tell Gelai. Later, Victoria receives a present unaware it's from Vera and accuses Gelai of sending the prank gift.
10	"The Wedding"	September 23, 2010 - October 6, 2010
Chloe holds her exhibition and sees Gelai with Vera. Gelai convinces Chloe that Vera has changed and Chloe and Vera made up, making everyone applaud. Caloy arrives to see Chloe and realizes that she is in a relationship with Neil. Louie is also there and tells Gelai about Victoria's pregnancy, and she gets devastated and leaves. Vera encourages her to fight to get Louie back from Victoria while Caloy beats up Louie for hurting Gelai. Victoria announces her pregnancy to the media and wants Louie to marry her to raise the baby, but Louie decides that he'll still marry Gelai. Despite Victoria's pregnancy, Gelai still wants the wedding to proceed, but Hermes opposes Gelai from marrying Louie. Vera asks Gelai if she can be her matron of honor and make her wedding dress, to which she agrees and Vera also asks Mark to pay for Gelai's wedding. While choosing the fabrics for Gelai's wedding dress, Vera admits to Gelai she met Manuel in Milan and Gelai says her father was working there, which is a coincidence. Victoria was thinking of killing her unborn child after watching Louie and Gelai back together by taking some pills and Ronaldo encourages her to continue with the pregnancy process. Later, Victoria sees her baby through an ultrasound and is happy, but is concerned that after it is born, it would be difficult to raise it as a single mother. Victoria later shows the ultrasound picture to Vera, to which she remembers in a flashback that Victoria was the one to blame for giving her a miscarriage years ago. Meanwhile, Caloy now lives in a hotel and he tries numerous attempts to make Chloe love him again. Chloe states that she has moved on, but deep inside, she still has feelings for Caloy. While Neil was away on business, Chloe goes to Caloy's hotel suite where the two had a 'one night stand.' When Neil returned from his business trip, he purposes to Chloe to marry him, and accepts. Later, Neil goes to the hotel where Caloy is living and discovers Chloe's watch. He later confronts her and she admits that she slept with Caloy and is still in love with him. Despite all that, Neil still wants the wedding to proceed, even though he's jealous of Caloy being with her. The rivalry between Gelai and Victoria heats up as they are to participate in a photo shoot, with Chloe as their photographer. Vera overhears a conversation from a few people that Gelai and Victoria have some resemblance that they could possibly be sisters and she already knows that they are. Chloe gets torn when she sees her mother giving attention to Gelai and not her.
11	"The Separation"	October 7, 2010 - October 14, 2010
It's the day of the wedding and Sonia encourages Hermes to be there, walking Gelai down the aisle. The FDGP, Neil, Chloe, Gigi, and Caloy were among those invited to witness the occasion. As Louie was getting ready to leave his house, Victoria appears and begs him not to marry Gelai. Just when Louie is about to leave, Victoria is bleeding in pain and takes her to the hospital. Back at the church, Gelai is anxiously waiting for Louie to arrive and Gelai is happy that Hermes is there, but is devastated that Louie isn't there and she tries to contact him. She later realizes that Louie is with Victoria and she cries desolately and runs away from the church. Back at the hospital, Louie is forced to make a decision to let either Victoria or the baby live as a result of Victoria losing an amount of blood and he decides to let Victoria live. As Victoria recovers, she learns that her baby died and Louie had left to go to the church. At the church, Gelai's parents announce to the guests that the wedding is off and Louie arrives, which resulted in Hermes confronting him. Gelai later ends up sleeping at Caloy's hotel after agonizing over her ruined wedding somewhere while Louie makes a promise to Gelai's parents to bring her back safely. Meanwhile, Vera learns of Victoria's miscarriage by watching the news and later goes to visit her at the hospital and Victoria gets furious by her presence and asks her to leave. Louie later visits the hospital, but realizes that Victoria has left and is at the cemetery with Ronaldo burying her unborn child, which was named Ana Angela Abella, alongside the grave of her mother and sister. In the evening, Victoria clandestinely hires a man to investigate on Mark while Gelai talks to Louie and tells him that she's breaking up with him. The next day, the two go to Victoria's house and Gelai asks her to forgive her, but Victoria asks her to leave. As Gelai returns to her shop, a spectator spills blood on her and it is revealed that it was one of Vera's machinations. Victoria learns from the hired man that Mark is a criminal and that Gelai's company will be affected. Chloe says to Neil that her relationship with Caloy is over and Neil offers her a plane ticket to go to Spain and get married there. Chloe later goes to Gelai's house to tell her and Vera that she's headed to Spain and Gelai invites her for a Thanksgiving dinner before she goes. Caloy tries another attempt to see Chloe again and later gets threatened by Neil to stay away from her, after hiring some men to beat him up. During the dinner in Gelai's house, Chloe is suspicious of Caloy's bruises and feels he's not himself.
12	"The Reveal"	October 15, 2010 - October 26, 2010
After the dinner, Gelai gives Vera and Sonia an appreciation gift as a sign of thanks for her success. Later, Gelai notices Vera and Mark talking outside and the two later go home. When Gelai returned inside, she noticed that Vera had forgotten her purse and goes with Hermes to follow Vera, who is riding in a taxi. Gelai returns the purse and was curious to know if the house she stopped at is really Vera's and Vera denies it. As soon as Gelai and Hermes left, Vera talks to Paul, who tells her he's heading for Singapore and make up with him. During rehearsals for an upcoming fashion show, the rivalry continues between Gelai and Victoria. Gigi notices something about Vera and tells Gelai. Victoria confronts Mark and tells him to sign a cheque and later gets arrested by investigators about his criminal past. Mark reveals Vera's true purposes, making Gelai realize that Vera has been using her the whole time to get her fashion career back. Vera explains to Gelai at her house but rejects and threatens her to stay away. With Vera owning Gelai's area, she extorts Gelai to continue to do her job for her and strictly warns Gelai that when she signed the contract, it is now under her ownership. Vera also spills the beans to Donna that Gelai and Victoria are sisters and she tries to tear them apart and later finds out that Donna has been working for Victoria and threatens her. Gelai and Gigi try to recruit new models by asking the locals in Divisoria to participate in the fashion show, but it doesn't go well. Vera strictly gives Gelai a second warning for ruining her name under her property. A boxer named Mr. Davis offers Louie $40,000 to lose his next fight on purpose and Louie later offers the money to Gelai for her fashion show. On the other hand, Caloy takes Chloe out to a resort, trying to win her back. Neil, unhappy that Chloe is with Caloy tries to find them.
13	"The Face-Off"	October 27, 2010 - November 2, 2010
Neil finds Chloe and she tells him that she is still in love with Caloy and breaks up with him. Neil eventually concedes and the next morning, he leaves a plane ticket and a note for Chloe, thanking her for their journey together and Chloe tries to look for Caloy. Caloy is also looking for Chloe and goes to a massage parlour, where he meets a lady that's also named Chloe and later gets arrested after the parlour was raided. Louie prepares for his upcoming match and invites Gelai to witness it and his coach learns about the money offer from Mr. Davis and tells Louie to give it back. During the match, Louie is losing and his coach contacts Gelai to be there immediately. Gelai, being stuck in traffic is unable to make it and prays to make him win, and he actually does. Meanwhile, Vera tells the locals, along with Gigi and Sonia that Gelai has hired regular models for the fashion show, leaving them disappointed. Later, Gelai decides to return the money, but not before she apologizes to the locals and Gigi what happened earlier. She later goes to Louie's house and sees Mr. Davis and his men demanding his money back and Gelai returns it to him. Mr. Davis later tells the men to kill Louie. At the fashion show backstage, the organizers noticed that Victoria's and Gelai's finale dresses are identical and the two have an argument and Gelai tells Victoria that her finale dress was inspired by her mother, leaving Victoria in shock. Sonia tells Gelai that Hermes has been given a job opportunity in Macau as a chef and sends a video message to her before the fashion show begins. The fashion show begins with Victoria and as her presentation is underway, Vera is taken away by Paul and Chloe stops him from maltreating her mother. Paul eventually leaves for good. Gelai sees Louie surrounded by some men and Louie manages to avoid getting shot. Back at the fashion show, it's Gelai's turn and the locals, as well as Gigi and Sonia showcase Gelai's designs. In the end, Gelai wins the fashion show and Victoria reflects on her shocking moment with Gelai earlier and later calls Louie to visit her regarding his friendship with Gelai. Louie tells Victoria that Gelai has been looking for her older sister as she is pursuing her love of fashion for her and Victoria realizes that Gelai is in fact, Angela.
14	"The Fire"	November 3, 2010 - November 4, 2010
Louie plans a surprise for Gelai by reuniting her with Victoria and both Gelai and Victoria feel a sense of joy. As Louie was about to pick up Victoria to meet with Gelai, he suddenly collapses and Victoria rushes him to the hospital, where he later dies of a brain injury. Sonia learns of Louie's death and calls Gelai to tell her the bad news and later gets a call from Victoria asking where Gelai is. Vera learns from her lawyer that Paul has owned everything she has except Gelai's fashion shop and decides to set it on fire to retrieve her insurance money back to remarket Vera Couture. Gelai, who happens to be at her shop, gets knocked unconscious by the smoke, and in horror Victoria goes in to save her. As Gelai is recovering, Vera blames Victoria for setting the fire, but Victoria tells the policemen that she was looking for Gelai and to tell her the news that she is her sister. Meanwhile, Chloe bails Caloy out of jail and finally confesses her love for him and the two make up. The next morning, Chloe overhears her mother's conversation with her lawyer and realizes that she started the fire. Victoria tells Ronaldo that Angela is alive and later goes to the cemetery where Gelai grieves over Louie's gravesite. Later, Gelai walks upon a grave seeing her mother's and her real name inscribed on it unaware that Victoria is in there, hoping to reunite with her sister. Victoria sees her and apologizes for everything that had happened and the two are finally reunited. They later celebrate at Ronaldo's house and both sisters thank their foster parents for looking after their other sister. Vera, having heard of the reunion through the newspaper, gets arrested by police for the fire, but has another plan to obliterate the two sisters.
15	"The Finale"	November 5, 2010
Gelai and Victoria are spending time together and Chloe joins them by showing them some of her mother's letters from Manuel. Meanwhile, Vera is loosed out of prison because Chloe bailed her out and paid the damages to the insurance company. Victoria and Gelai also held a fashion show that presents clothes that are inspired by their mother Stella. Vera has also called on another plan to assassinate Gelai and Victoria by dropping a chandelier on top of them. At the end of the fashion show, Gelai and Victoria call Chloe up on stage as well as Vera, who is surprised. Suddenly, the chandelier falls and the consequence remains a mystery. Few months later, Victoria and Vera are featured on the cover of a fashion magazine, Chloe and Caloy are seen married in a wedding magazine, and Sonia, Hermes, and Ronaldo are seen in a parenting magazine. Later, two young girls are seen at the exact spot where young Anna and Angela stood at from the very beginning and see a billboard of Gelai and the new company 'House of Abella' next to it. The youngest of the two wanted a new pair of shoes and Victoria appears in front of them, offering to take the girls to the mall and they accept. The scene ends with the title of the episode.
