= A Lullaby to the Sorrowful Mystery =

2016 historical fantasy drama film by Lav Diaz

- Theatrical release poster
- Hele sa Hiwagang Hapis
- Directed by: Lav Diaz
- Written by: Gian Anciro
- Produced by: Lav Diaz; Fran Borgia; Jeremy Chua; Bianca Balbuena; Paul Soriano; Marc Tanunliong
- Starring: John Lloyd Cruz; Piolo Pascual
- Cinematography: Larry Manda
- Edited by: Lav Diaz
- Music by: Ely Buendia; Danny Fabella
- Production companies: Ten17P; Epicmedia; Sine Olivia Pilipinas; Potocol; Akanga Film Productions
- Distributed by: ABS-CBN Film Productions
- Release dates: 18 February 2016 (Berlin); 26 March 2016 (Philippines)
- Running time: 485 minutes
- Countries: Philippines; Singapore
- Languages: Filipino; English; Spanish; Hokkien
- Box office: ₱4 million

A Lullaby to the Sorrowful Mystery (Filipino: Hele sa Hiwagang Hapis) is a 2016 historical fantasy film directed by Lav Diaz. A co-production between the Philippines and Singapore, the film competed for the Golden Bear at the 66th Berlin International Film Festival, eventually winning the Alfred Bauer Prize. It was theatrically released in the Philippines by Star Cinema.

== Cast ==
- John Lloyd Cruz as Isagani
- Piolo Pascual as Simoun / Crisostomo Ibarra
- Hazel Orencio as Gregoria 'Oryang' De Jesus
- Alessandra De Rossi as Ceasaria Belarmino
- Susan Africa as Aling Hule
- Joel Saracho as Mang Karyo
- Bernardo Bernardo as Lalake / Tikbalang
- Cherie Gil as Babae / Tikbalang
- Angel Aquino as Androgynous / Tikbalang
- Sid Lucero as Basilio
- Ely Buendia as Musikero
- Bart Guingona as Kapitan Heneral
- Kuya Manzano as Padre Camorra
- Menggie Cobarrubias as Padre Florentino
- Ronnie Lazaro as Sebastian Caneo

== Reception ==
The film received mixed reviews from critics, with criticism mostly directed towards its pacing and confusing narrative. Guy Lodge of Variety states in his review that "A major disappointment from a major filmmaker, Diaz's latest super-sized tapestry of historical fact, folklore and cine-poetry is typically ambitious in its expressionism—but sees the helmer venturing into the kind of declamatory, didactic rhetoric that his recent stunners Norte, the End of History and From What Is Before so elegantly avoided."

== See also ==
- List of longest films
