= 2007 Cinemalaya =

3rd Cinemalaya Independent Film Festival
- Opening film: Foster Child by Brillante Mendoza
- Location: Metro Manila, Philippines
- Film titles: 18
- Festival date: July 20, 2007–July 29, 2007
- Website: Official Website

Cinemalaya chronology
- 2008 2006

The 3rd Cinemalaya Independent Film Festival was held from July 20 until 29, 2007 in Metro Manila, Philippines.

Cinemalaya was presented by the Cultural Center of the Philippines and the Film Development Council of the Philippines.

== Entries ==
The winning film is highlighted with boldface and a dagger.

=== Full-Length Features ===
Title	Director	Cast
Endo	Jade Castro	Jason Abalos, Ina Feleo
Gulong	Sockie Fernandez	Ina Feleo, Gardo Versoza
Kadin	Adolfo Alix, Jr.	Servilino Alavado, Monica Joy Camarillas, Rico Mark Cardona
Ligaw Liham	Jay Abello; Manny Montelibano	John Michael Lee, George Macainan, Clarissa Deles
Pisay	Auraeus Solito	Gammy Lopez, Annicka Dolonius, Carl John Barrameda
Still Life	Katski Flores	Ron Capinding, Glaiza de Castro
**Tribu** ^{†}	Jim Libiran	Shielbert Manuel, Havy Bagatsing, Karl Eigger Balingit
Tukso	Dennis Marasigan	Sid Lucero, Ping Medina, Ricky Davao

=== Short films ===
Title	Director
Doble Vista	Nisha Alicer; Nix Lañas
Durog	Tara Illenberger
Gabon	Emmanuel dela Cruz
Liwanag sa Dilim	Lawrence Fajardo
Maikling Kwento	Hubert Tibi
Misteryo ng Hapis	Mark dela Cruz
Nineball	Enrico Aragon
**Rolyo** ^{†}	Alvin Yapan
Tagapagligtas	Ma. Solita Garcia
To Ni	Vic Acedillo

== Awards ==
Full-Length Features

- Best Film - Tribu by Jim Libiran
  - Special Jury Prize - Endo by Jade Castro
  - Audience Award - Pisay by Auraeus Solito
- Best Direction - Auraeus Solito for Pisay
- Best Actor - the male ensemble of Tribu
- Best Actress - Ina Feleo for Endo
- Best Screenplay - Dennis Marasigan for Tukso
- Best Cinematography - Rodolfo Aves Jr. for Kadin
- Best Sound - Mark Laccay for Tribu
- Best Original Music Score - Jerrold Tarog for Kadin

Short Films

- Best Short Film - Rolyo by Alvin Yapan
  - Special Jury Prize - Nineball by Enrico Aragon
  - Audience Award - Doble Vista by Nisha Alicer and Nix Lañas
- Best Direction - Emmanuel dela Cruz for Gabon
- Best Screenplay - Vic Acedillo for To Ni
