= 2006 Cinemalaya =

2nd Cinemalaya Independent Film Festival
- Opening film: Kubrador by Jeffrey Jeturian
- Location: Metro Manila, Philippines
- Film titles: 18
- Festival date: July 17, 2006–July 23, 2006
- Website: Official Website

Cinemalaya chronology
- 2007 2005

The 2nd Cinemalaya Independent Film Festival was held from July 17 until 23, 2006 in Metro Manila, Philippines.

== Entries ==
The following films are entries to the New Breed: Full-Length Feature section of Cinemalaya. The winning film is highlighted with boldface and a dagger.

=== Full-Length Features ===
Title	Director	Cast
Batad: Sa Paang Palay	Benji Garcia	Gina Alajar, Noni Buencamino, Alchris Galura, Hiedi Morata
Donsol	Adolfo Alix, Jr.	Sid Lucero, Angel Aquino, Cherie Gil, Jaclyn Jose
Ang Huling Araw ng Linggo	Nick Joseph Olanka	Johnny Delgado, Boots Anson-Roa, Jennifer Sevilla, Baron Geisler
In da Red Korner	Dado Lumibao	Meryll Soriano, Aiza Marquez, Kathleen Hermosa, Grace Morales
Mudraks	Arah Jell Badayos; Margaret Guzman	Rio Locsin, Ricky Davao, Roxanne Barcelo, Miguel Lorenzo Javier
Rotonda	Ron Bryant	Mark Gil, Meryll Soriano, Epy Quizon, Mario Magalona
Saan Nagtatago si Happiness?	Florida Bautista	Andy Bais, Mica Torre, Caridad Sanchez, Ricky Davao
**Tulad ng Dati** ^{†}	Mike Escareal Sandejas	The Dawn, Ping Medina, Agot Isidro, Mylene Dizon

=== Short films ===
Title	Director
10:25 ng Gabi	Reggie Gulle
Gee-gee at Waterina	Mariami Tanangco; J. Dennis Teodosio
Kwarto	Jose Emmanuel Taylo
Labada	Raz dela Torre
No Passport Needed	Pepe Diokno
**Orasyon** ^{†}	Rommel Tolentino
Parang Pelikula	Hubert Tibi
Putot	Jeck Cogama
Puwang	Anna Isabelle Matutina
Sa Silaw	Reinzi Balao

== Awards ==
Full-Length Features

- Best Film: Tulad ng Dati by Mike Sandejas
  - Special Jury Prize: Batad: Sa Paang Palay by Benji Garcia and Vic Acedillo, Jr.
- Best Direction: Ron Bryant for Rotonda
- Best Performance of an Actor: Alchris Galura for Batad: Sa Paang Palay
- Best Performance of an Actress: Angel Aquino for Donsol
- Best Screenplay: Vic Acedillo, Jr. for Batad: Sa Paang Palay
- Best Cinematography: Eli Balce for Donsol
- Best Sound Design: Ronald de Asis for Tulad ng Dati
- Best Editing:
  - Mikael Angelo Pestaño for Tulad ng Dati
  - Hernani Hona, Jr. for Rotonda
- Best Original Music Score: Lirio Salvador for Rotonda
- Best Production Design: Aped Santos and Noel "Lola" Navarro for Batad: Sa Paang Palay

Short Films

- Best Film: Orasyon by Rommel Tolentino
  - Special Jury Prize: Kwarto by Jose Maria Emmanuel C. Taylo
- Best Direction: Jeck Cogama for Putot
- Best Screenplay: Hubert Tibi for Parang Pelikula

== Jury ==
Selected for the Jury were:

- Mark Escaler
- Roger Garcia
- Chito S. Roño
- Kidlat Tahimik
- Steve Vesagas
