= Goodbye America =

- Film poster
- Directed by: Thierry Notz
- Screenplay by: Michael Sellers; Bob Couttie; Frederick Bailey
- Story by: Michael Sellers; Bob Couttie; Ricardo Lee
- Produced by: Charo Santos-Concio; Malou N. Santos; Michael Sellers; Pamela Vlastas
- Starring: Wolfgang Bodison; Corin Nemec; James Brolin; John Haymes Newton; Alexis Arquette; Rae Dawn Chong
- Cinematography: Sharone Meir
- Edited by: Brent Shoenfeld
- Music by: Roy Hay
- Production companies: ABS-CBN International; Quantum Entertainment
- Distributed by: Star Pacific Cinema
- Release date: August 20, 1997
- Running time: 116 minutes
- Countries: Philippines; United States
- Language: English
- Budget: ₱85 million (estimated)

Goodbye America is a 1997 action drama film directed by Thierry Notz. The film examines how the closing of the U.S. naval base at Subic Bay, Philippines affected the Filipinos and the Americans who had served there. The film was an attempt to bring Filipino cinema into the international audience.

== Plot ==
As the U.S. Subic Bay naval base's operations slowly wind down and naval manpower begins to dwindle, Commander Hamilton (Wolfgang Bodison) relies on three U.S. Navy SEALs to help keep the base secure. William Hawk (John Haymes Newton), a longtime American sailor nearing the end of a tour of duty, is involved with a Filipina, Lisa Velasquez (Nanette Medved), a representative of the mayor's office in nearby Olongapo City. Lisa has to deal with the economic crisis that the base's closing will bring to her community, as well as her own personal problems brought on by Hawk's imminent departure and the strained relationship of her mother, Anna (Daria Ramirez), and stepfather, Ed (James Brolin).

Paul Bladon (Alexis Arquette), another Navy SEAL at the Subic Bay base, is the son of a U.S. Senator (Michael York), who will be visiting Subic Bay for the base's closing ceremonies. Senator Bladon is bringing along Paul's American girlfriend Angela (Maureen Flannigan), though Paul has fallen in love with a Filipina, Emma (Alma Concepcion), a former prostitute who now plans to marry Paul. The third Navy SEAL, John Stryzack (Corin Nemec), is furious over what he sees as America's betrayal of its responsibilities in the Philippines; he winds up behind bars after a violent incident, but he plans to escape to assassinate Senator Bladon, whom he believes is responsible for the closing of the base.

== Cast and characters ==
- Alexis Arquette as Paul Bladen
- Alma Concepcion as Emma Salazar
- Angel Aquino as Maria
- Corin Nemec as John Stryzack
- James Brolin as Ed Johnson
- John Haymes Newton as William Hawk
- Maureen Flannigan as Angela
- Michael J. Sarna as Large Sailor
- Michael York as Senator Bladon
- Nanette Medved as Lisa
- Daria Ramirez as Anna
- Rae Dawn Chong as Danzig
- Wolfgang Bodison as Jack Hamilton
- Richard J. Gordon as himself, the mayor of Olongapo City

== Release ==
The film premiered in the Philippines on August 20, 1997, and at the Film Market of the 1997 Cannes Film Festival, where the screening attracted curious distributors and the movie garnered some hype.

It had a television premiere in Greece, Finland as Hyvästi, Amerikka and in Germany as Im Namen der Ehre.

=== Reception ===
Most critics found the subject potent and timely. However, the film had an excess of characters and the end product was disorganized. It was hailed as a Filipino film thinly disguised as a Hollywood B-movie.

In Rotten Tomatoes, it has an average score of 3 out of 5, based on 124 user reviews.

=== Home media ===
The official DVD of the film was released on April 16, 1999, in the Philippines and Hungary. In United States, the film was released by MTI Home Video. In Brazil, it was released by Sunset Productions and D+T.

== See also ==
- List of films featuring the United States Navy SEALs
