= Apoy sa Dagat =

2013 Philippine television drama series

- Title card
- Also known as: Raging Love
- Genre: Melodrama; Romance; Action; Crime; Suspense
- Created by: ABS-CBN Studios; Henry King Quitain
- Written by: Sonny Calvento; Ronalisa Co; BJ Lingan
- Directed by: FM Reyes; Nick Olanka; Rechie del Carmen; Jerry Lopez Sineneng
- Creative director: Johnny delos Santos
- Starring: Angelica Panganiban; Diether Ocampo; Piolo Pascual; Angel Aquino; Aiko Melendez
- Theme music composer: Leah Navarro
- Opening theme: "Kailangan Kita" by Angeline Quinto; "Kailangan Kita" by Jed Madela
- Composer: George Canseco
- Original language: Filipino
- No. of episodes: 102

Production
- Executive producers: Carlo Katigbak; Cory Vidanes; Laurenti Dyogi; Ruel Bayani
- Producers: Kristine P. Sioson; Annaliza A. Goma; Malou N. Santos; Des M. De Guzman
- Production location: Philippines
- Running time: 30 minutes; Monday to Friday at 21:30 (PST)
- Production company: Star Creatives

Original release
- Network: ABS-CBN
- Release: February 11 – July 5, 2013

Apoy sa Dagat (International title: Raging Love / transl. Fire in the Sea) is a 2013 Philippine television drama melodrama series broadcast by ABS-CBN. Directed by FM Reyes and Nick Olanka, it stars Angelica Panganiban, Piolo Pascual, Diether Ocampo, Angel Aquino and Aiko Melendez. It aired on the network's Primetime Bida line up and worldwide on TFC from February 11 to July 5, 2013, replacing Kahit Puso'y Masugatan and was replaced by Muling Buksan ang Puso.

== Synopsis ==
The story is of a woman named Serena (Angelica Panganiban) who grew up with no memory about her real identity and why she was swept off to an island. With no family to hold on to, Serena finds and forms a special bond with Ruben (Piolo Pascual), the fishing village's roguish champion, whom she will eventually fall in love with.

and unfortunate accident test's Serena's love for Ruben. The story questions how far Serena will go to save the life of the only man she loves as well as what Anton's (Diether Ocampo) relevance is to Serena's life. One of the major questions asked is who is Rebecca (Angelica Panganibanand how will she affect the lives of Ruben, Anton and Serena?

== Cast and characters ==
The lead cast of Apoy sa Dagat.

=== Main cast ===
- Angelica Panganiban as Serena Mirasol / Rosanna V. del Sol & Rebecca V. del Sol
- Piolo Pascual as Ruben Manubat
- Diether Ocampo as Antonio "Anton" Lamayre
- Angel Aquino as Adrianna "Andeng" Lamayre
- Aiko Melendez as Odessa Villarosa-del Sol

=== Supporting cast ===
- Liza Lorena as Ildelfonsa del Sol
- Freddie Webb as Manolo Lamayre
- Perla Bautista as Lornita Mirasol
- Sylvia Sanchez as Callixta "Tessie" Caballero
- Ricardo Cepeda as Benedict "BDM" D. Manubat
- Eric Fructuoso as Tristan Corpuz / Theodoro Balitaan
- Iya Villania as Helena Redentor
- Melai Cantiveros as Paprika "Pops" Mendoza
- Regine Angeles as Kara Cruz
- Bryan Santos as Liam "Orwell" Manubat

=== Recurring cast ===
- Zeppi Borromeo as Balong
- Moi Bien as Piper
- Natasha Cabrera as Flor
- Rico Barrera as Lando
- Alizon Andres as Tomas

=== Guest cast ===
- Mikylla Ramirez as Stephanie Lamayre
- Wendy Valdez as Bernadette Lamayre
- Jamilla Obispo as Mildred Balitaan
- Arnold Reyes as Zandro Ricaforte†
- Fred Payawan as Clive Sta. Maria
- Justin Cuyugan as Sebastian Lobregat
- Yayo Aguila as Dolores Manubat
- Idda Yaneza as Meding
- Crispin Pineda as Juancho
- Joshua Dionisio as teen Orwell
- Menggie Cobarrubias
- Justin Gonzales

=== Special participation ===
- Empress Schuck as young Adrianna
- Nikki Gil as young Odessa
- Patrick Garcia as Alberto del Sol
- Isabel Rivas as young Ildelfonsa
- Sharmaine Suarez as young Lornita
- Christian Vasquez as young Manolo
- Kalila Aguilos as Suzanna Lamayre
- Manuel Chua as young Benedict
- Kitkat as young Tessie
- Devon Seron as young Bernadette
- Jong Cuenco as Miguel del Sol
- RJ Padilla as young Anton
- Lance Angelo Lucido as young Liam
- Nathaniel Britt as young Ruben
- Veyda Inoval as young Rosanna/Serena and Rebecca

== Soundtrack ==
- Kailangan Kita - Angeline Quinto
- Anong Nangyari Sa Ating Dalawa - Aiza Seguerra
- I Will Never Leave You - Erik Santos
- If You Ever Change Your Mind - Marion Aunor
- Kastilyong Buhangin - Piolo Pascual
- Kailangan Kita - Jed Madela

== Production ==
The initial premiere of Apoy Sa Dagat was originally February 4, 2013, replacing Kahit Puso'y Masugatan. It was later postponed and moved to February 11, 2013.

== Ratings ==
KANTAR MEDIA NATIONAL TV RATINGS (9:30 PM PST)
PILOT EPISODE	FINALE EPISODE	PEAK	AVERAGE	SOURCE
25.9%	27.1%	28.6%		

== See also ==
- List of programs broadcast by ABS-CBN
- List of ABS-CBN Studios original drama series
