= Mumbaki (film) =

1996 action drama film by Antonio "Butch" Perez

- Directed by: Antonio "Butch" Perez
- Written by: Antonio "Butch" Perez; Amado Lacuesta
- Produced by: Eric Cuatico
- Starring: Raymart Santiago; Albert Martinez
- Cinematography: Eduardo Jacinto
- Edited by: Manet Dayrit
- Music by: Jaime Fabregas
- Production company: Neo Films
- Distributed by: Neo Films
- Release date: August 14, 1996
- Running time: 130 minutes
- Country: Philippines
- Language: Filipino

Mumbaki is a 1996 Philippine action drama film co-written and directed by Butch Perez. The film stars Raymart Santiago, and Albert Martinez. This marks Angel Aquino's theatrical debut. Its title refers to a native shaman or ritual specialist in Ifugao culture.

== Plot ==
Joseph, a doctor, returns to his hometown of Lidum in Ifugao, along with his girlfriend and fellow doctor Nancy, to attend the funeral of his father Dangunay, a tribal healer (mumbaki) and leader who was killed in a dispute with the villagers of Alimit led by Atiwan. Joseph makes friends with Felix, the community doctor, while Nancy explores Lidum and the origins of its feud with Alimit. Joseph learns that his fellow villagers, led by his uncle Ginoldang, who is also a mumbaki, have passed off his father's death as an accident to authorities to prevent them from interfering. At an unsuccessful attempt at mediation, Joseph encounters Atiwan's niece Dolores, who was betrothed to Joseph before he left to pursue his studies. That night, Joseph is ritually selected to avenge his father's death, which he refuses because of his duties as a doctor.

The next day, Felix tells Joseph that a pneumonia epidemic has broken out and asks for his help. Despite Ginoldang's warning that Atiwan is seeking to kill him, Joseph goes with Felix to treat patients in other villages. At Felix’s clinic, they are visited by Dolores and other villagers from Alimit, who ask for their help to treat their tribe. Joseph reluctantly agrees to go with her to Alimit, but on their way, they are ambushed by warriors of Lidum led by his cousin Carlos, forcing Joseph to stay behind.

In Banaue, Joseph's brother Jimmy is killed by men from Alimit while working as a tour guide. As they transport Jimmy’s corpse to Lidum, Joseph and Carlos encounter warriors led by Atiwan's son Daniel, leading to a battle. Joseph is shot by Daniel, but escapes with Carlos before passing out upon arriving at Lidum. Joseph hovers near death for several days before recovering, during which he dreams of entering the Ifugao spirit realm inhabited by his ancestors and their gods (baki) and beheads a warrior in combat who turns out to be himself. In Alimit, Felix deduces that Dolores still has feelings for Joseph after noticing her concern at hearing his condition.

Nancy, concerned over Joseph's safety, persuades him to return to Manila and pursue their internship at Johns Hopkins University. But after being robbed, Nancy helps him obtain medicines to stop the epidemic and lets him return to Ifugao. Arriving at Felix's clinic, Joseph finds him in despair over the epidemic's spread and the escalation of the conflict, but revives his spirits when he shows him the medicines he had brought. Joseph arrives in Lidum and treats Ginoldang, who anoints him as the next mumbaki and dies shortly after Joseph ritually assumes the post. Joseph also sends medicines to Alimit through Felix. Among those healed is Dolores, who is moved by Joseph's deed.

Aya, Carlos' girlfriend, visits Joseph's hut and has sex with him. As she leaves, she is confronted by Carlos but are attacked and killed by Daniel, who beheads him as a trophy. Seeking to avenge their deaths and recover Carlos' head, Joseph leads an attack on Alimit. In the melee, Joseph kills Daniel, but Felix is fatally shot while trying to stop Joseph and Atiwan from killing each other. Realizing that their conflict has killed their friend, the two end their feud, restoring peace between their villages. Three years later, Dolores and Joseph, who has decided to remain in Ifugao to serve as a mumbaki and community doctor, cradle their newborn son.

== Cast ==
- Raymart Santiago as Dr. Joseph Dumalilon
- Albert Martinez as Carlos Bakayyawan
- Joel Torre as Dr. Felix Lorenzo
- Rachel Alejandro as Dr. Nancy Madrid
- Ruby Moreno as Aya Imaya
- Ace Espinosa as Daniel Atiwan
- Angel Aquino as Dolores
- Ray Ventura as Apo Ginoldang
- Pen Medina as Ramon Atiwan
- Edward Vergara as Jimmy Dumalilon
- Joe Gruta as Apo Dangunay
- Rolando Tinio as Ngidulu
- Randy David as Ngidulu's Assistant
- Rudy Borromeo as Peacetalk Mediator
- Angelo Suarez as Lando
- Emilio Rodrigo as Anaban
