= Faces of Love (2007 film) =

- DVD cover
- Directed by: Eddie Romero
- Written by: Eddie Romero; Rica Arevalo
- Starring: Christopher de Leon; Angel Aquino
- Edited by: Ronald Allan Dale
- Music by: Jobin Ballesteros
- Production company: MFX Media
- Release date: February 21, 2007
- Country: Philippines
- Language: Filipino

Faces of Love is a 2007 Filipino film directed by Eddie Romero and starring Christopher de Leon and Angel Aquino with supporting actors Alfred Vargas, Bembol Roco, Mon Confiado, Chanda Romero and Juliana Palermo. It was Romero's first digital film, but also his penultimate film.

== Cast ==
- Christopher de Leon as Don Arcadio
- Angel Aquino
- Alfred Vargas
- Juliana Palermo
- Chinggoy Alonzo
- Jackie Aquino
- Mon Confiado
- Ricky Davao
- Mavee Lozano
- Bembol Roco
- Chanda Romero
- Rodel Velayo
