= Magkaribal =

2010 Philippine television drama series

- Title card
- Genre: Romance; Soap opera; Rivalry
- Created by: Ricardo Lee; Henry King Quitain
- Developed by: ABS-CBN Studios
- Written by: Jay Fernando; G3 San Diego; BJ Lingan; Christine Badillo Novicio; Genesis Rodriguez
- Directed by: Nuel Crisostomo Naval; Mae Czarina Cruz-Alviar
- Starring: Bea Alonzo; Gretchen Barretto; Derek Ramsay; Erich Gonzales; Enchong Dee; Angel Aquino
- Music by: Jesse Lucas
- Opening theme: "Kapag Ako Ay Nagmahal" by Juris Fernandez
- Ending theme: "Kapag Ako Ay Nagmahal" by Jolina Magdangal
- Composer: Larry Hermoso
- Country of origin: Philippines
- Original language: Filipino
- No. of seasons: 1
- No. of episodes: 94 (list of episodes)

Production
- Executive producers: Carlo Katigbak; Cory Vidanes; Laurenti Dyogi; Malou Santos; Ginny Monteagudo-Ocampo
- Producers: Lindsay Anne Dizon; Ellen Nicolas Criste; Henry King Quitain
- Production location: Metro Manila
- Editors: Dennis Salgado; Joy Buenaventura
- Running time: 30-45 minutes
- Production company: Star Creatives

Original release
- Network: ABS-CBN
- Release: June 28 – November 5, 2010

Related
- Triunfo del amor Pusong Ligaw; FlordeLiza

Magkaribal (International title: Rivals) is a 2010 Philippine drama television series starring Bea Alonzo and Gretchen Barretto. The series ran on ABS-CBN from June 28 to November 5, 2010, replacing Pinoy Big Brother: Teen Clash 2010 and was replaced by Perfect Match.

== Premise ==
Two sisters, Anna and Angela Abella, are separated due to a tragedy caused by their long family back story.

Anna trains herself to be a perfect Filipina model and fashion designer under her new name Victoria Valera. Meanwhile, Angela is adopted by the Agustins and is renamed Angela “Gelai” Agustin. Both of them end up having the same ambition in fashion as they did in their childhood together. So they cross paths in the fashion industry unaware that they are sisters and greedily end up as rivals; not just in their careers, but also in love.

Vera Cruz is a famous model and fashion designer, and is also the woman in the past who caused the Abella family's destruction. Now she is ready to keep the two women fighting, and aims to destroy Victoria's image with Gelai to avoid their closure. Vera is determined to stop the Abella sisters from uniting against her to dethrone her. But what if the two eventually find out the truth? Can they heal the wounds of their rivalry?

== Cast and characters ==
=== Main cast ===
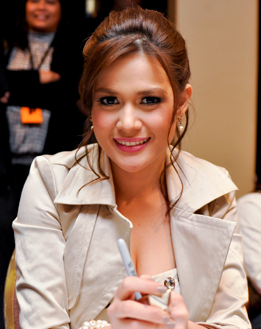
Bea Alonzo portrays Gelai Agustin / Angela Abella

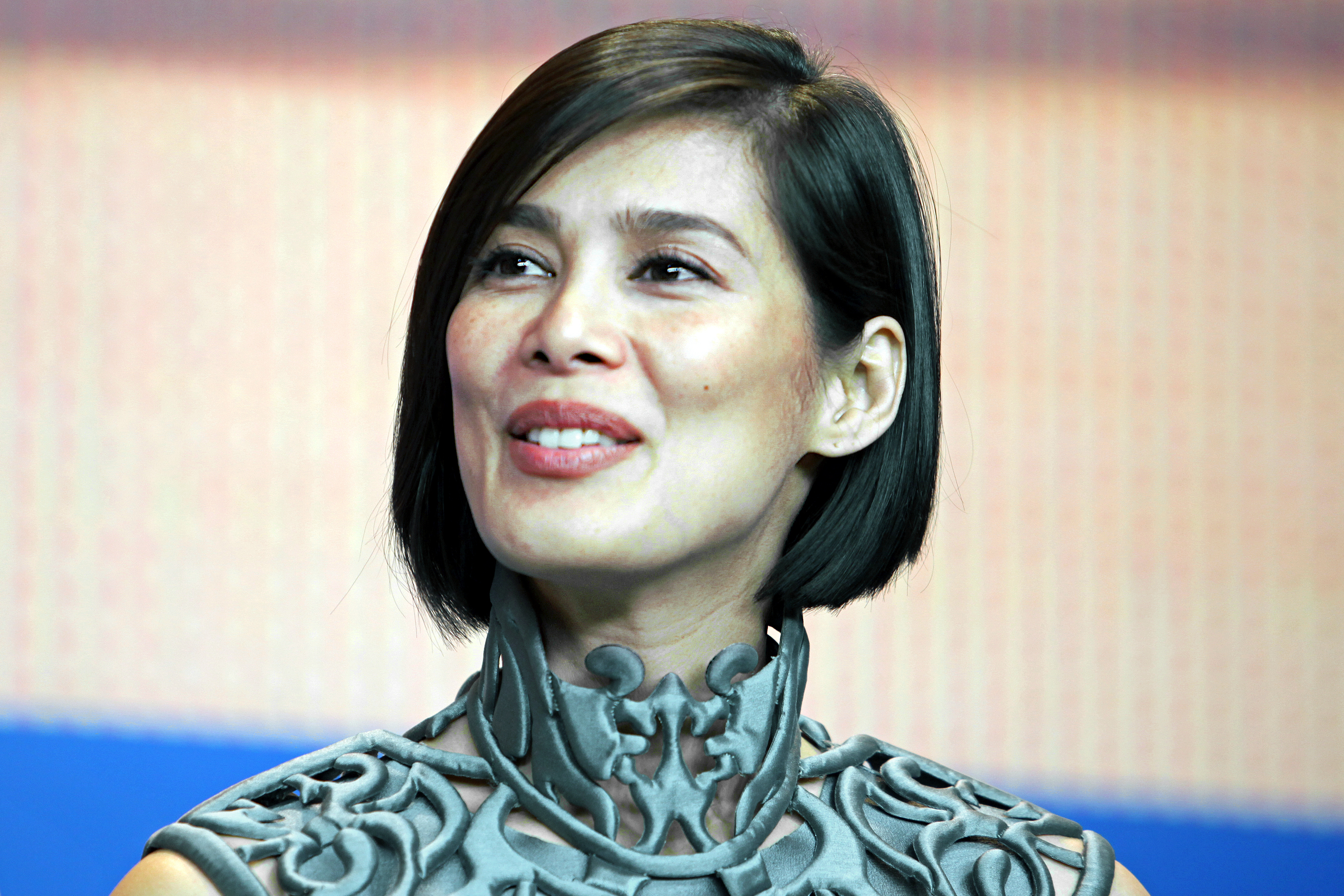
Angel Aquino portrays Vera Cruz-Abella

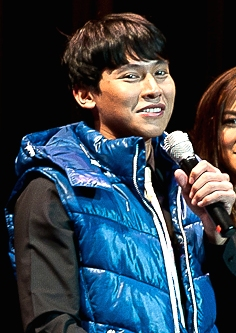
Enchong Dee portrays Caloy Javier.

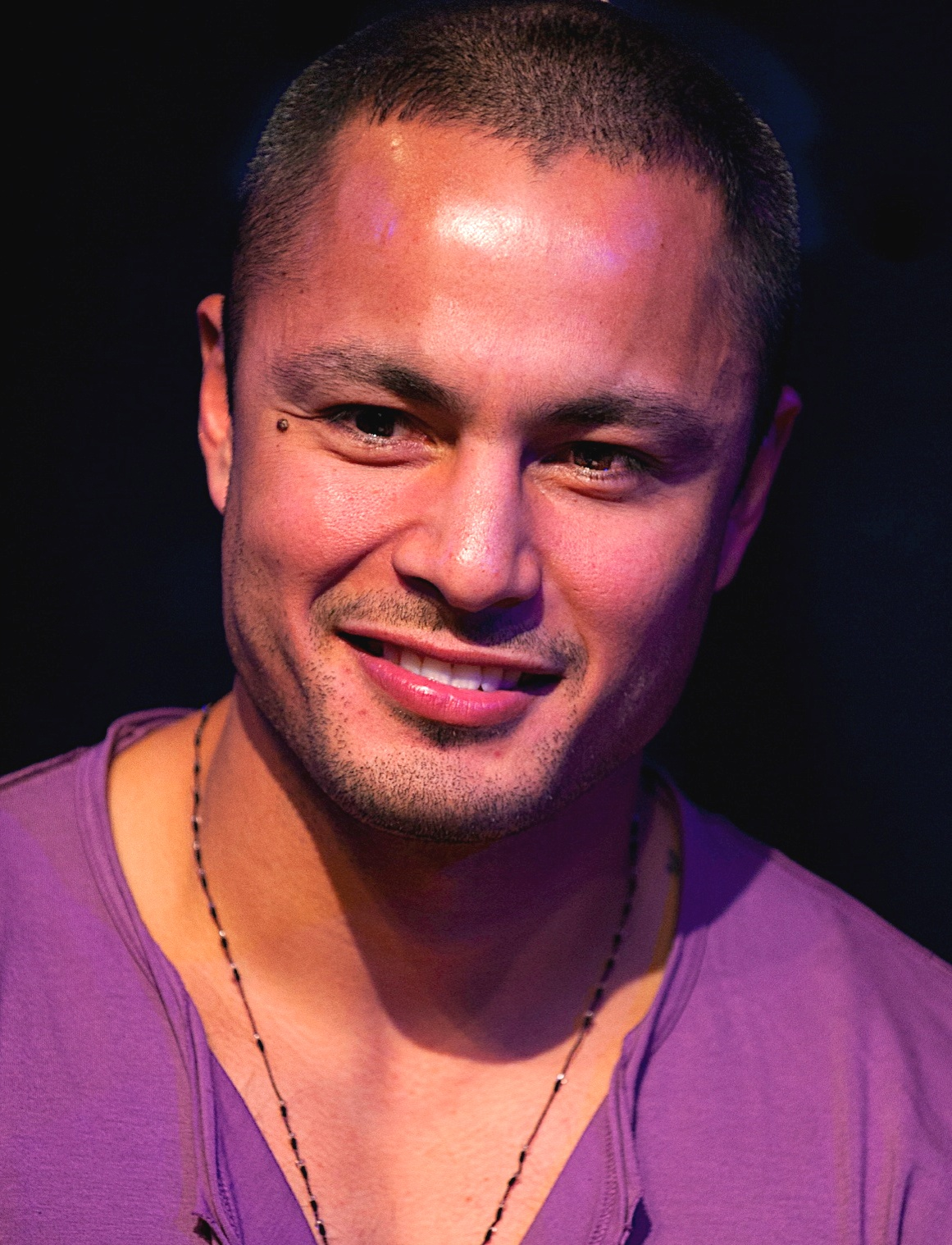
Derek Ramsay portrays Louie Villamor

- Bea Alonzo as Angela "Gelai" Agustin / Angela Abella
- Gretchen Barretto as Victoria Valera / Anna Abella
- Angel Aquino as Vera Cruz-Abella
- Derek Ramsay as Louie Villamor
- Erich Gonzales as Chloe C. Abella
- Enchong Dee as Caloy Javier

=== Supporting cast ===
- Robert Arevalo as Ronaldo Valera
- Mark Gil as Manuel Abella
- John Arcilla as Hermes Agustin
- Arlene Muhlach as Sonia Agustin
- Lyka Ugarte as Betsy
- Bianca Manalo as Gigi Fernando
- Nina Ricci Alagao as Donna
- Beatriz Saw as Kate Delovieres
- Toffee Calma as Jean Paul
- R.S. Francisco as Gian Franco
- Artemio Abad as Johnny
- Rodjun Cruz as Calvin
- Marc Abaya as Neil Olaguer
- Lorenzo Mara as Salvador
- RJ Ledesma as Christian Ocampo
- Edward Mendez as Marc Laurel
- Christian Vasquez as Paul
- Irma Adlawan as Carolina

=== Special participation ===
- Kathryn Bernardo as young Anna/Victoria
- Barbie Sabino as young Angela/Gelai
- Nash Aguas as young Louie/Doz
- Dimples Romana as Stella Abella
- James Blanco as young Manuel
- Alessandra de Rossi as young Vera
- Allan Paule as young Ronaldo

== Production ==
The show is set the fashion world and includes costuming and cameo appearances by local designers. According to several executives behind the show's production, the series was originally planned to stage the comeback of actress Donna Cruz. During the course of pre-production, Cruz was to play Angela Abella/Gelai Agustin, and Angel Aquino was initially considered to portray the role of Anna Abella/Victoria Valera. Christopher de Leon was also tapped to play the role of Manuel, and Cherie Gil was shortlisted as Vera Cruz. The series also included Derek Ramsay as Louie, Enchong Dee as Caloy, and Erich Gonzales as Chloe. After Cruz backed out due to her commitments in Cebu where she permanently resides, ABS-CBN tapped real-life sisters Gretchen Barretto and Claudine Barretto for the roles of Anna/Victoria and Angela/Gelai respectively. After the latter's transfer to GMA Network along with actors de Leon and Gil, the production was again delayed. It was only until Bea Alonzo's casting as Angela Abella/Gelai Agustin that the series continued to develop, with Barretto retaining the role as Anna/Victoria, and Aquino this time playing the role of Vera. Mark Gil took the role of Manuel in the final casting of characters. A young Kathryn Bernardo would be cast in the role of a young Anna/Vera, which she did she simultaneously with GMA Network series Endless Love wherein she played the role of young Jenny. Following her performance in Magkaribal, she went on to be cast as Mara in the Mara Clara remake.

== Re-runs ==
It aired re-runs on Jeepney TV from January 6 to April 17, 2014; April 6 to May 21, 2015; September 4 to October 13, 2017; April 21 to August 4, 2019; December 26, 2022 to March 3, 2023; October 28 to December 27, 2024 (also aired on ALLTV) and February 7 to July 11, 2026.

== Reception ==
Magkaribal received heavy promotion as competition for GMA Network's Endless Love, whose pilot aired at the same time (even though Magkaribal aired a little later than Endless Love). The show premiered on June 28, 2010, with a 25.3% national household rating against its direct competition, Diva on GMA Network with a 19.4% national household rating (Endless Love scored a pilot rating of 22.9%, which aired earlier than Magkaribal). Magkaribal posted a 30.0% national household rating on its finale against its rival show (direct competition in the timeslot), Beauty Queen, which only managed to score a 14.4% national household rating.

=== Awards and recognitions ===
Year	Award-giving body	Award	Recipient	Result
2011	New York Festivals TV & Film Awards	Best Telenovela	Magkaribal	Nominated
2011	9th Gawad Tanglaw Awards	Best Drama Series	Magkaribal	Won
2011	Golden Screen TV Awards	Outstanding Performance by an Actress in a Drama Series	Gretchen Barretto	Nominated
2011	Golden Screen TV Awards	Outstanding Performance by an Actor in a Drama Series	Derek Ramsay	Nominated
2011	Golden Screen TV Awards	Outstanding Original Drama Series	Magkaribal	Nominated
2011	25th Star Awards for TV	Best Primetime TV Series	Magkaribal	Nominated
2011	25th Star Awards for TV	Best Drama Actress	Gretchen Barretto	Won
2011	25th Star Awards for TV	Best Drama Actress	Angel Aquino	Nominated
2011	25th Star Awards for TV	Best Drama Actress	Bea Alonzo	Nominated
2011	25th Star Awards for TV	Best Drama Actor	Derek Ramsay	Nominated

== International broadcast ==
As with many ABS-CBN teleseryes, Magkaribal aired in Kenya dubbed in English under the title Rivals. It was broadcast on NTV during the prime 6pm - 7pm timeslot in 2011.

== See also ==
- List of programs broadcast by ABS-CBN
- List of telenovelas of ABS-CBN
- List of programs broadcast by Jeepney TV
