= Donsol (film) =

- Film poster
- Directed by: Adolfo B. Alix Jr.
- Written by: Adolfo B. Alix Jr.
- Produced by: Adolfo B. Alix Jr.
- Starring: Sid Lucero; Angel Aquino
- Cinematography: Eli Balce
- Edited by: Tara Illenberger
- Music by: Jesse Lucas
- Production company: Bicycle Pictures
- Distributed by: ABS-CBN Film Productions (Note: Under the joint label, Star Cinema/ABS-CBN Film Productions Inc.)
- Release date: November 29, 2006
- Running time: 115 minutes
- Country: Philippines
- Languages: Filipino; Bicolano

Donsol is a 2006 Filipino independent drama film written, produced, and directed by Adolfo B. Alix. It stars Sid Lucero and Angel Aquino. Shot entirely in Donsol, Sorsogon, and featuring underwater shots of whale sharks, it tackled major issues like illegal fishing that poses threats to the said marine species.

Produced by Bicycle Pictures, in association with Giant Sponge Productions and supported by Liwayway Marketing Corporation, the film premiered on July 18, 2006, as an entry to the 2nd Cinemalaya Independent Film Festival. It was given a commercial release by ABS-CBN Film Productions on November 29. It was selected as the Philippines' entry for the Best Foreign Language Film at the 80th Academy Awards but was not nominated.

== Plot ==
A whale shark guide named Daniel (Sid Lucero) falls in love with the beautiful but mysterious tourist Teresa (Angel Aquino). The two individuals are nursing their own heartaches but find themselves hopelessly drawn to each other; Daniel was left behind by his girlfriend for a rich man, and Teresa, who is actually a widowed breast cancer patient.

Fidel (Bembol Roco), Daniel's father, is an illegal fisherman and was caught by the police coast guard. This created friction between the relationship of Daniel and the kapitana of the town, who provided jobs for them as a Butanding Interaction Officer or BIO.

== Cast ==
- Sid Lucero as Daniel
- Angel Aquino as Teresa
- Cherie Gil as Mars
- Jacklyn Jose as Ligaya
- Bembol Roco as Fidel
- Kenneth Ocampo as Nog
- Mark Gil as Dustin
- Aaron Junatas as Daniel's younger brother

== Accolades ==
Year	Result	Award	Category/Recipient
2007	Won	Golden Screen Award	Best Cinematography (Eli Balce) and Best Breakthrough Performance by an Actor (Sid Lucero)
2007	Nominated	Gawad Urian Award	Best Actor (Sid Lucero)
2007	Nominated	FAMAS Award	Best Art Direction (Gessan Enriquez), Best Child Actor (Aaron Junatas), and Best Musical Score (Jesse Lucas)
2007	Won	FAMAS Award	Best Cinematography (Eli Balce)
2006	Won	Spirit of the Independent Award	Feature Category
2006	Won	Balanghai Trophy	Best Cinematography and Best Performance of an Actress (Angel Aquino)

== See also ==
- Donsol, Sorsogon
