= Adolfo Alix Jr. =

Filipino screenwriter and film director (born 1978)

- Born: October 17, 1978 (age 47); Makati, Philippines
- Occupations: Filmographer, director
- Years active: 1999–present

Adolfo Borinaga Alix Jr., also known as Adolf Alix Jr. (born October 17, 1978), is a Filipino screenwriter and film director.

== Early life and education ==
He was born October 17, 1978, in Makati, Philippines.

He graduated magna cum laude at the Pamantasan ng Lungsod ng Maynila (University of the City of Manila) with a degree in Mass Communications.

He started as a scriptwriter for films and television. His screenplays include Carlos Siguion-Reyna's Kahapon May Dalawang Bata (1999), Gil Portes' Mga Munting Tinig (2002) and Homecoming (2003), Joyce Bernal's D' Anothers (2005), among others.

He also handled film and screenwriting classes at his alma mater, San Beda College-Alabang and at De La Salle University-Taft.

== Career ==
Alix's first film, Donsol was a finalist in the 2006 Cinemalaya film festival where it won Best Actress and Best Cinematography honors. The film was screened in several international film festivals abroad and garnered Special Jury prizes in the Asian Marine Film Festival in Japan and in the Fort Lauderdale International Film Festival in the U.S.A. It was also the Philippines' official submission to the Academy Awards® (OSCARS) Best Foreign Language Film category.

Since his debut as a director, his subsequent films have been screened at various international film festivals.

Kadin (2006), Alix's second feature, premiered in the Ici et ailleurs section of the 60th Locarno International Film Festival in Switzerland and competed in the 27th Festival International du Film d' Amiens in France. His third film, Tambolista (2007) was featured in the Sturm und Drang (Cinema of the Future) section of the 37th Rotterdam International Film Festival. Adela (2008), his feature starring veteran actress Anita Linda, was screened at Toronto, Pusan and Rotterdam International Film Festivals and was part of the Contempor Asian series of the Museum of Modern Art in New York. It also won in all the categories of the Young Critics' Circle Awards 2009 including Best Picture and Best Performer.

Manila (2009), starring and produced by Piolo Pascual and co-directed with Raya Martin, was selected in the Out-of-Competition (Special Screenings) section of the 62nd Festival de Cannes.

Aurora (2009), about a social worker kidnapped in the Southern Philippines, received post-production support from the Hubert Bals Fund of the International Film Festival Rotterdam. Chassis (2010), dealing with the lives of people illegally living under the chassis of container vans, competed in Mar 25 del Plata International Film Festival after its screenings in Pusan, Rotterdam, Goteborg, Warsaw and Vancouver.

Isda (Fable of the Fish) (2011) starring Cherry Pie Picache and Bembol Roco, premiered in the Visions section of the Toronto International Film Festival and was screened in Busan, Kerala, Dubai, Nantes and Goteborg. Haruo (2011), about the travails of an ex-Yakuza living in the Philippines, was awarded by the Young Critics' Circle as their Best Film of 2011.

His twentieth feature Kalayaan (Wildlife) (2012), which received script development support from the Hubert Bals Fund of the International Film Festival Rotterdam and an honorable mention from the Global Film Initiative, starred Thai superstar Ananda Everingham premiered in the Busan International Film Festival and won Best Asian Film in the Warsaw International Film Festival among others.

Mater Dolorosa, a Cinema One Originals 2012 entry and headlined by Gina Alajar, about a matriarch trying to put her family together against the backdrop of local illegal activities won Best Director honors at the Gawad Urian and competed in the Rotterdam International Film Festival and the Deauville Asian Film Festival in France.

Death March (2013), based on real events about the difficulties of the Filipino and American soldiers after the fall of Bataan, competed in the Un Certain Regard section of the prestigious Festival de Cannes 2013.

Porno (2013), a triptych of stories about people linked by pornography, which premiered in the Directors Showcase category of the 2013 Cinemalaya Independent Film Festival. The project was part of the Hong Kong-Asia Film Financing Forum in 2009. The film was voted Best Film by the Young Critics Circle for 2013 winning four other awards including Best Performer. It also won the Gawad Urian (National Critics Awards) for Best Production Design.

In television, he started as a director for ABS-CBN's daytime series Hiyas based on Precious Hearts romance books.

Then, he directed GMA News TV's first original series Bayan Ko (Catholic Mass Media awardee for Best Drama Series and Best Inspirational Drama in the Asian Rainbow TV Awards 2014) which dealt with the exploits of a young town mayor trying to change the system and Sa Puso ni Dok for GMA Network, a miniseries about the plight of doctors to the barrios (Certificate of Honor – Best Miniseries from the U.S. T.V. and Video International Film Festival)

He is currently one of the regular directors of Wagas, a weekly anthology of true-to-life love stories, (which garnered Gold honors in the U.S. T.V. and Video International Film Festival 2014) the afternoon drama anthology Karelasyon and the weekly comedy series Conan, My Beautician.

He has also served as a member of the international jury of the Busan International Film Festival in 2013 and the Shanghai International Film Festival in 2014.

Alix has been listed by The Hollywood Reporter in its "Next Generation Asia 2010", which features the top 20 young entertainment personalities in the region deemed "the best and the brightest among their peers" from a vast region considered "the world"s biggest entertainment market."

In November 2022, Kontrabida (The Villain), directed by Alix, starring Nora Aunor, won Best Asian Film at the 2022 Hanoi International Film Festival.

== Filmography ==
Key
†	Denotes films that have not yet been released

=== Film ===
Year	Title	Credited as				Notes
Year	Title	Director	Screenwriter	Editor	Producer	Notes
1999	Kahapon, May Dalawang Bata	No	Story	No	No	"Ada"
2002	Mga Munting Tinig	No	Yes	No	No	
2006	Donsol	Yes	Yes	No	Executive	entered to the 2nd Cinemalaya Independent Film Festival; The Philippines' official entry for the 2006 Academy Award for Best Foreign Language Film
2007	Kadin	Yes	Yes	No	Yes	entered to the 3rd Cinemalaya Independent Film Festival
2007	Nars	Yes	No	No	No	
2007	Tambolista	Yes	No	No	No	
2007	Batanes	Yes	No	No	No	
2008	Daybreak	Yes	No	No	No	
2008	Adela	Yes	Yes	No	Yes	also production design
2008	Immoral	Yes	No	No	Executive	
2009	Manila	Yes	Yes	No	No	
2009	Aurora	Yes	Yes	No	Yes	
2009	Ante	Yes	No	No	Yes	
2010	Romeo at Juliet	Yes	No	No	No	
2010	D'Survivors	Yes	Story	No	No	
2010	Muli	Yes	No	Yes	Yes	
2010	Chassis	Yes	Yes	Yes	No	entered to the 2010 Mar del Plata Film Festival
2010	Presa	Yes	Yes	No	No	Winner of Best Indie Film at the 2010 Metro Manila Film Festival
2011	Isda	Yes	No	No	No	Production design
2011	Liberation	Yes	Yes	Yes	No	
2011	Haruo	Yes	No	No	No	
2012	Kalayaan	Yes	Yes	No	No	Production designer
2012	Mater Dolorosa	Yes	No	No	No	Production designer
2013	Death March	Yes	No	No	No	entered to the Un Certain Regard section of 2013 Cannes Film Festival
2013	Porno	Yes	No	No	No	Production designer
2013	Ang Alamat ng China Doll	Yes	No	No	No	Production designer
2014	Kinabukasan (The Day After)	Yes	No	No	Yes	Production designer
2015	Chain Mail	Yes	Yes	No	No	Story and screenplay
2016	Padre de Familia	Yes	Story	No	No	Production designer
2016	Whistleblower	Yes	No	No	Yes	Co-producer
2016	Mrs.	Yes	No	Yes	Executive	
2016	4 Days	Yes	Yes	Yes	Executive	not credited for editing
2017	Pastor	Yes	No	No	No	
2017	Madilim ang Gabi	Yes	Yes	Yes	No	
2017	Love Is...	Yes	No	No	No	TV movie
2018	Haligi ng Pangarap	Yes	Yes	No	No	TV movie
2018	Taray ni Tatay	Yes	No	No	No	TV movie
2019	Bato (The General Ronald dela Rosa Story)	Yes	No	No	No	
2019	Mystery of the Night	Yes	No	Yes	No	
2019	Kiko En Lala	Yes	No	Yes	No	
2019	Circa	Yes	Yes	Yes	Yes	entry to the 2019 Pista ng Pelikulang Pilipino
2020	Coming Home	Yes	Story	Yes	No	
2021	My Stepmother's Lover	Yes	No	No	No	
2021	Huwag Kang Lalabas	Yes	Story	No	No	entry to the 2021 Metro Manila Film Festival
2022	Bugso	Yes	No	No	No	
2023	That Boy in the Dark	Yes	No	No	Yes	line producer/supervising producer
2023	Pieta	Yes	No	No	No	
2024	After All	Yes	No	Yes	No	
2024	Mananambal	Yes	Yes	No	No	
2024	X & Y	Yes	No	Yes	No	
2024	The Vigil	Yes	No	Yes	No	Credited as Xila Ofloda (editor)
2025	Unconditional	Yes	Story	Yes	No	
2025	The Time That Remains †	Yes	TBA	TBA	TBA	
TBA	Poon †	Yes	TBA	TBA	TBA	Post-production

== Awards and citations ==
Year	Award	Category	Movie Title	Result	Recipient(s)
1999	Film Development Foundation	Best in Screenwriting	Winner	Kahapon May Dalawang Bata (2002)	Adolfo Alix Jr.
2003	FAMAS Awards	Best Screenplay	Finalist	Mga Munting Tinig (Small Voices) (2002)	Shared with Gil Portes and Senedy Que
2003	Gawad Urian	Best Screenplay (Pinakamahusay na Dulang Pampelikula)	Finalist	Mga Munting Tinig (Small Voices) (2002)	Shared with Gil Portes and Senedy Que
2003	Palm Beach International Film Festival	Best Screenplay	Winner	Mga Munting Tinig (Small Voices) (2002)	Shared with Gil Portes and Senedy Que
2003	STAR Awards, Gawad Urian and FAMAS Awards	Best Picture	Winner	Mga Munting Tinig (Small Voices) (2002)	Shared with Gil Portes and Senedy Que
2006	Cinemalaya Independent Film Festival	Best Picture	Finalist	Donsol (2006)	Adolf Alix Jr.
2006	Fort Lauderdale International Film Festival and the Asian Marine Film Festival	Special Jury Prize	Winner	Donsol (2006)	Adolf Alix Jr.
2007	Cinema One Originals	Best Picture	Finalist	Tambolista (2007)	Adolf Alix Jr.
2015	Gawad Urian	Best Short Film	Winner	Kinabukasan (The Day After)	Adolfo Alix Jr.
2022	Boden International Film Festival	Best Director	Winner	That Boy in the Dark (2022)	Adolf Alix Jr.
