= Judy Ann Santos filmography =

Filipino actress filmography

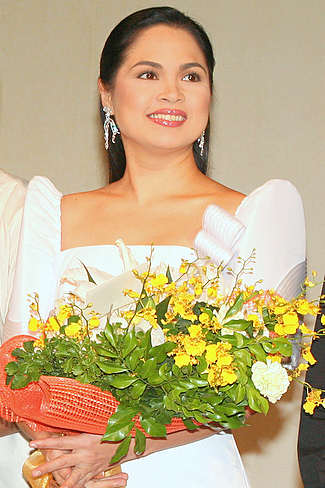
Santos attending the premiere of Ploning in 2008

Judy Ann Santos began her career performing as a child on film and television. Her first screen appearance was in a supporting role in the drama series Kaming Mga Ulila (1986) and she made her film debut with a minor role in Sana Mahalin Mo Rin Ako (1988), appearing alongside Nora Aunor and Tirso Cruz III. At age ten, Santos had her first leading role as the eponymous character in the children's television series Ula, Ang Batang Gubat (1988). She achieved wider recognition when she and Gladys Reyes played the titular roles in the drama series Mara Clara (1992). The show, which aired until 1997, became one of the longest running Filipino television series. It established her as a star and earned Santos a FAMAS Award for her performance in the 1996 film adaptation.

Following this breakthrough, Santos went on to play several lead roles on primetime television, including the soap opera Esperanza (1997), and the anthology series Judy Ann Drama Special (1999). She then played a woman born out of wedlock yearning for her father's acceptance in the drama series Sa Puso Ko, Iingatan Ka (2001), an NBI agent in the police procedural series Basta't Kasama Kita (2003), and the title character in the superhero series Krystala (2005). For the last of these, she received a Star Award for Best Actress. Santos's film roles have also garnered praise from critics. As a woman with dissociative identity disorder in the psychological drama Sabel (2004), she won a Gawad Urian and Golden Screen Award for Best Actress. In 2006, Santos starred opposite Ryan Agoncillo as his feisty and outspoken wife in Jose Javier Reyes's comedy Kasal, Kasali, Kasalo, her biggest critical and commercial success to date. Santos was awarded with the FAMAS, Golden Screen, Luna, Metro Manila Film Festival, and Star Award for Best Actress. The following year, she reprised her role in the sequel Sakal, Sakali, Saklolo (2007).

Santos starred in several high-profile directors' projects, including Joel Lamangan's period drama Aishite Imasu 1941: Mahal Kita (2004), Topel Lee's supernatural horror Ouija (2007), and Jun Lana's psychological horror thriller Mag-ingat Ka Sa... Kulam (2008). The 2010 medical drama series Habang May Buhay reunited her with Reyes of Mara Clara, and won her a KBP Golden Dove Award for Best Actress. She then served as a presenter in the Philippine editions of the reality television competition shows Junior MasterChef (2011), MasterChef (2012), and Bet on Your Baby (2013). Santos went on to play an abused wife seeking revenge in the domestic drama series Huwag Ka Lang Mawawala (2013) and the antihero in the drama series Starla (2019).

Alongside her screen work, Santos co-produced the independent film Ploning (2008). She also starred in the Brillante Mendoza–directed war drama Mindanao (2019). Both films were submissions for Best International Feature Film at the 81st and 93rd Academy Awards, respectively. For the latter, she garnered Best Actress wins at the 41st Cairo International Film Festival and the 45th Metro Manila Film Festival.

== Film ==
Key
†	Denotes films that have not yet been released

Judy Ann Santos's film credits with year of release, film titles and roles
Year	Title	Role	Notes	Ref(s)
1988	Sana Mahalin Mo Ako	Young Catherine		
1988	Sa Puso Ko Hahalik ang Mundo	Young Claudia		
1989	Regal Shocker: The Movie	Jenny	Segment: "Aparador"	
1989	Impaktita	Young Cita		
1989	Kung Maibabalik Ko Lang	Tammy		
1989	Wanted: Pamilya Banal	Young Lorena		
1990	Dyesebel	Iday		
1991	Madonna, ang Babaeng Ahas	Young Madonna		
1993	Silang Mga Sisiw sa Lansangan	Crisanta		
1993	Manila Boy	Neneng		
1994	Father en Son	Tina		
1995	Dog Tag: Katarungan sa Aking Kamay	Claudia		
1996	Sana Naman	Bless		
1996	Kung Alam Mo Lang	Anna		
1996	Mara Clara: The Movie	Mara del Valle / Mara Davis		
1996	Nasaan Ka Nang Kailangan Kita	Stef		
1997	Kulayan Natin Ang Bukas	Maria Elisa		
1997	Babangon ang Huling Patak ng Dugo	Isabel		
1997	Ako Ba Ang Nasa Puso Mo?	Teresa		
1997	Wow... Multo	Judy		
1997	Paano ang Puso Ko?	Cecile		
1997	Sanggano	Angelica		
1997	Nasaan ang Puso?	Ria		
1997	Babae	Alex		
1998	Muling Ibalik ang Tamis ng Pag-ibig	Millet		
1998	I'm Sorry My Love	Tinay		
1998	Kay Tagal Kang Hinintay	Anna		
1998	Kasal-Kasalan (Sakalan)	Milet		
1999	My Pledge of Love	Raida		
1999	Gimik: The Reunion	Diane Villaruel		
1999	Isusumbong Kita sa Tatay Ko...	Joey Rivera		
1999	Dito sa Puso Ko	Ligaya Tatlonghari		
1999	Esperanza	Esperanza Estrera		
2000	Pera o Bayong (Not da TV)	Herself	Cameo	
2000	Minsan Ko Lang Sasabihin	Anna Liwanag		
2000	Kahit Isang Saglit	Annie		
2001	Luv Text	Melissa		
2001	Mahal Kita... Kahit Sino Ka Pa!	Karen		
2001	Bakit 'Di Totohanin	Kate		
2002	Walang Iwanan... Peksman!	Helen		
2002	May Pag-ibig Pa Kaya?	Emily		
2002	Akala Mo	Rezzette		
2002	Magkapatid	Lisa		
2002	Pakisabi Na Lang... Mahal Ko Siya	Geraldine		
2002	Jologs	Herself	Cameo	
2002	Jeannie, Bakit Ngayon Ka Lang?	Jeannie		
2003	Till There Was You	Joanna Boborol		
2003	Mano Po 2: My Home	Grace Tan		
2004	I Will Survive	Mylene		
2004	Sabel	Sabel		
2004	Aishite Imasu 1941: Mahal Kita	Virginia "Binia/Inya/Viniand Commander Berto" M. Marasingan-Manalang	It Nominated Best Actress 30th Metro Manila Film Festival	
2006	Don't Give Up on Us	Abby		
2006	Miss Pinoy	Dona		
2006	Umaaraw, Umuulan	Herself	Cameo	
2006	Kasal, Kasali, Kasalo	Angie	it first new Best Actress 32nd Metro Manila Film Festival	
2007	Ouija	Aileen		
2007	Sakal, Sakali, Saklolo	Angie		
2008	Ploning	Ploning	Also Producer	
2008	Mag-ingat Ka Sa... Kulam	Mira / Maria		
2009	Oh, My Girl! A Laugh Story...	Darling / Opao		
2010	Hating Kapatid	Rica Salvador		
2011	My House Husband: Ikaw Na!	Mia		
2012	Mga Mumunting Lihim	Mariel		
2012	Si Agimat, si Enteng Kabisote at si Ako	Angelina Kalinisan Orteza / Ako		
2014	T'yanak	Julie		
2016	Kusina	Juanita		
2018	Ang Dalawang Mrs. Reyes	Lianne Reyes	Leading role	
2019	Mindanao	Saima		
2024	The Diary of Mrs. Winters	Charity		
2024	Espantaho	Monet	Also executive producer, it Best Actress 50th Metro Manila Film Festival	
2025	Ex Ex Lovers	Darlene		

== Television ==
Key
†	Denotes shows that have not yet been aired

Judy Ann Santos's television credits with year of release, show titles and roles
Year	Title	Role	Notes	Ref(s)
1986	Kaming Mga Ulila	Street urchin		
1988	Ula, Ang Batang Gubat	Ula		
1992–1997	Mara Clara	Mara Davis / Del Valle		
1996	Gimik	Dianne Villaruel		
1994	Maalaala Mo Kaya	Liezl	Episode: "Sa Kandungan Mo, Inay"	
1997–1999	Esperanza	Esperanza Estrera / Socorro Salgado		
1997	Wansapanataym	Leyla	Episode: "Ang Mahiwagang Palasyo"	
1997	Maalaala Mo Kaya	Cristina	Episode: "Agua Bendita"	
1999–2001	Judy Ann Drama Special	Various	An installment of the anthology series Star Drama Presents	
1999	Maalaala Mo Kaya	Carla	Episode: "Karnabal"	
2001–2003	Sa Puso Ko, Iingatan Ka	Patricia Montecillo		
2001	Maalaala Mo Kaya	Jasmine	Episode: "Basket"	
2001	Maalaala Mo Kaya	Arlene	Episode: "Pier 39"	
2003	Basta't Kasama Kita	Princess Gonzales		
2004	Krystala	Tala / Krystala		
2005	Maalaala Mo Kaya	Susan	Episode: "Rosaryo"	
2006	Sa Piling Mo	Jennifer		
2006	Maalaala Mo Kaya	Claire	Episode: "Swing"	
2006	Komiks Presents: Inday Bote	Inday	An installment of the anthology series Komiks	
2006	Komiks Presents: Inday sa Balitaw	Inday	An installment of the anthology series Komiks	
2006	Komiks Presents: Super Gee	Super Gee	An installment of the anthology series Komiks	
2007	Ysabella	Ysabella Cuenca		
2007	Bida Ng Buhay Ko: 20 Years of Judy Ann Santos	Herself	Television special	
2008	Maalaala Mo Kaya	Anita	Episode: "Lason"	
2009	George and Cecil	George		
2009	Pangarap ni Ploning	Herself	Television special	
2009	May Bukas Pa	Libay	Guest role	
2010	Habang May Buhay	Jane Alcantara		
2010	Your Song Presents: Gimik 2010	Dianne Villaruel	An installment of the anthology series Your Song	
2011	100 Days to Heaven	Tagabantay / Chef	Guest role	
2011	Junior MasterChef Pinoy Edition	Herself	Host	
2012	MasterChef Pinoy Edition	Herself	Host	
2013	Huwag Ka Lang Mawawala	Anessa Panaligan		
2013	Bet on Your Baby	Herself	Host	
2014	I Do	Herself	Host	
2015	Maalaala Mo Kaya	Belen	Episode: "Ilog"	
2019	FPJ's Ang Probinsyano	Jane Sebastian	Guest role	
2019	Starla	Teresa Dichaves		
2020	Paano Kita Mapasasalamatan?	Herself	Host	
2022	Magandang Buhay	Herself	Guest co-host	
2026	Call My Manager	Andrea Manuel		
TBA	The Bagman †	TBA		

== See also ==
- List of awards and nominations received by Judy Ann Santos
