= List of awards and nominations received by Judy Ann Santos =

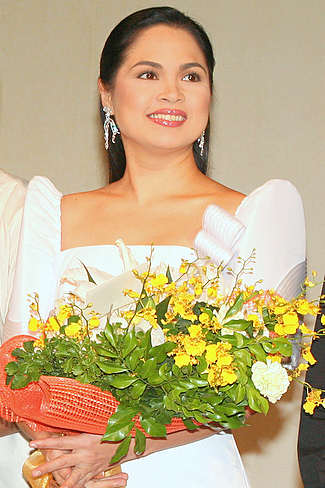
Santos attending the premiere of Ploning in 2008

Judy Ann Santos is a Filipino actress and film producer who has received various awards and nominations for her work in film and television. At the age of eight, she began her acting career with a supporting role in the drama series Kaming Mga Ulila (1986). Santos had her breakthrough role in the drama series Mara Clara (1992) and earned her first FAMAS Award for her performance in its 1996 film adaptation. Three years later, she starred opposite Fernando Poe Jr. in the comedy drama Isusumbong Kita sa Tatay Ko (1999). It became the first Filipino film to earn more than ₱100 million at the box office, for which Santos was awarded the Box Office Queen title. The supporting role of a Chinese mogul's daughter in the family drama Mano Po 2: My Home (2003) won her a Golden Screen Award. Santos made a transition to adult roles playing a woman with dissociative identity disorder in the 2004 psychological drama Sabel, for which she received the Gawad Urian for Best Actress. For her role as the titular character in the superhero series Krystala (2005), she won the Star Award for Best Drama Actress.

Further critical and commercial success came with Jose Javier Reyes's comedy drama Kasal, Kasali, Kasalo (2006), in which Santos starred opposite Ryan Agoncillo as his character's feisty and outspoken wife involved with the complexities that arise as she interacts with her family and in-laws. She won several awards, including a Metro Manila Film Festival, a Luna, and a Star Award for Best Actress. In 2009, Santos co-produced and starred in the independent film Ploning (2009). She was nominated for numerous accolades as an actress and producer, including FAMAS, Golden Screen, and Luna Awards for Best Actress. She was cast in the role of nurse Jane Alcantara in Wenn Deramas's medical drama series Habang May Buhay (2010), and earned the KBP Golden Dove Award for Best Actress in a Drama Series. For her next appearance, the ensemble drama Mga Mumunting Lihim (2012), she was jointly awarded Best Actress and Best Supporting Actress alongside Iza Calzado, Janice de Belen, and Agot Isidro at the Cinemalaya Independent Film Festival. In 2015, Santos appeared in an episode of the anthology series Maalaala Mo Kaya, which earned her the Star Award for Best Single Performance by an Actress.

Santos received her second Best Actress nomination at the Cinemalaya Independent Film Festival for her role in the drama Kusina (2016). She played a married woman who discovers her husband's infidelity in the comedy Ang Dalawang Mrs. Reyes in 2018, and garnered a Comedy Actress of the Year win at the Box Office Entertainment Awards. In 2019, Santos portrayed a Muslim woman caring for her cancer-stricken daughter while her husband is deployed in Brillante Mendoza's war drama Mindanao. She won Best Actress at the Cairo International Film Festival, becoming the second Filipino, after Nora Aunor, to receive the top acting honor. Santos is the recipient of many honorary awards, including the Dekada Award from the Golden Screen and Star Awards.

== Awards and nominations ==
Awards and nominations received by Judy Ann Santos
Organizations (Note: Awards, festivals, honors and other miscellaneous organizations are listed in alphabetical order.)	Year (Note: Indicates the year of ceremony. Each year is linked to the article about the awards held that year, wherever possible.)	Recipient(s)	Category	Result	Ref.
Anak TV Seal Awards	2017	Judy Ann Santos	Hall Of Famer for Female Makabata Star	Won	
Box Office Entertainment Awards	1997	Mara Clara: The Movie	Teenage Queen of Philippine Movies	Won	
Box Office Entertainment Awards	1998	Paano ang Puso Ko?	Teenage Queen of Philippine Movies	Won	
Box Office Entertainment Awards	1999	Kay Tagal Kang Hinintay	Miss RP Movies	Won	
Box Office Entertainment Awards	2000	Isusumbong Kita sa Tatay Ko...	Box Office Queen	Won	
Box Office Entertainment Awards	2019	Ang Dalawang Mrs. Reyes	Comedy Actress of the Year	Won	
Cairo International Film Festival	2019	Mindanao	Best Actress	Won	
Cinemalaya Independent Film Festival	2012	Mga Mumunting Lihim	Best Actress (Note: Shared with co-stars Iza Calzado, Janice de Belen, and Agot Isidro)	Won	
Cinemalaya Independent Film Festival	2012	Mga Mumunting Lihim	Best Supporting Actress	Won	
Cinemalaya Independent Film Festival	2016	Kusina	Best Actress	Nominated	
Gawad Pasado	2005	Aishite Imasu 1941: Mahal Kita	Best Actress	Nominated	
Gawad Pasado	2006	Kasal, Kasali, Kasalo	Best Actress	Nominated	
Gawad Pasado	2008	Ouija	Best Actress	Won	
Gawad Pasado	2009	Ploning	Best Actress	Won	
Gawad Pasado	2009	Ploning	Best Picture (Note: As producer)	Won	
Gawad Pasado	2020	Mindanao	Best Actress (Note: Shared with Kathryn Bernardo)	Won	
Gawad Pasado	2025	Espantaho	Best Actress	Nominated	
Gawad Tanglaw	2005	Sabel	Chairman's Award for Excellence in Acting	Won	
Gawad Tanglaw	2009	Ploning	Best Picture	Won	
Gawad Tanglaw	2009	Ploning	Best Actress	Won	
Gawad Tanglaw	2014	Huwag Ka Lang Mawawala	Best Actress	Won	
Gawad Tanglaw	2020	Mindanao	Best Actress	Won	
Gawad Urian	2003	Magkapatid	Best Supporting Actress	Nominated	
Gawad Urian	2005	Sabel	Best Actress	Won	
Gawad Urian	2007	Kasal, Kasali, Kasalo	Best Actress	Nominated	
Gawad Urian	2008	Sakal, Sakali, Saklolo	Best Actress	Nominated	
Gawad Urian	2009	Ploning	Best Actress	Nominated	
Golden Screen Awards	2004	Mano Po 2: My Home	Best Supporting Actress	Won	
Golden Screen Awards	2004	Basta't Kasama Kita	Best Actress in a Drama Series	Nominated	
Golden Screen Awards	2004	Sabel	Best Actress in a Leading Role – Drama	Won	
Golden Screen Awards	2005	I Will Survive	Best Actress in a Leading Role – Musical or Comedy	Nominated	
Golden Screen Awards	2007	Kasal, Kasali, Kasalo	Best Actress in a Leading Role – Musical or Comedy	Won	
Golden Screen Awards	2008	Sakal, Sakali, Saklolo	Best Actress in a Leading Role – Musical or Comedy	Nominated	
Golden Screen Awards	2009	Ploning	Best Actress in a Leading Role – Drama	Nominated	
Golden Screen Awards	2009	Ploning	Best Picture	Nominated	
Golden Screen Awards	2011	Judy Ann Santos	Movie Icons of Our Time	Won	
Golden Screen Awards	2012	My House Husband: Ikaw Na!	Best Actress in a Leading Role – Musical or Comedy	Nominated	
Golden Screen Awards	2013	Mga Mumunting Lihim	Best Actress in a Leading Role – Drama	Nominated	
Golden Screen Awards	2013	Judy Ann Santos	Dekada Award	Won	
Golden Screen Awards	2026	Judy Ann Santos	Dekada Award	Won	
FAMAS Awards	1989	The Lost Command	Best Child Actress	Nominated	
FAMAS Awards	1997	Mara Clara: The Movie	German Moreno Youth Achievement Award	Won	
FAMAS Awards	1997	Mara Clara: The Movie	Best New Movie Actress	Won	
FAMAS Awards	1998	Nasaan Ang Puso?	Best Supporting Actress	Nominated	
FAMAS Awards	1999	Kay Tagal Kang Hinintay	Best Actress	Nominated	
FAMAS Awards	2005	Sabel	Best Actress	Nominated	
FAMAS Awards	2007	Kasal, Kasali, Kasalo	Best Actress	Won	
FAMAS Awards	2008	Sakal, Sakali, Saklolo	Best Actress	Nominated	
FAMAS Awards	2009	Ploning	Best Actress	Nominated	
FAMAS Awards	2009	Ploning	Best Picture	Nominated	
FAMAS Awards	2019	Ang Dalawang Mrs. Reyes	Best Actress	Nominated	
FAMAS Awards	2025	Judy Ann Santos	Child Icon of Philippine Cinema	Won	
FAMAS Awards	2025	Judy Ann Santos	Nora Aunor Superstar Award	Won	
FAMAS Awards	2025	Espantaho	Best Actress	Nominated	
Fantasporto International Film Festival	2025	Espantaho	Best Actress	Won	
Film Development Council of the Philippines	2020	Mindanao	A-Lister	Won	
Film Development Council of the Philippines	2025	Espantaho	Annual Achievement Award	Won	
KBP Golden Dove Award	2010	Habang May Buhay	Best Actress in a Drama Series	Won	
Luna Awards	1998	Nasaan Ang Puso?	Best Supporting Actress	Nominated	
Luna Awards	2005	Sabel	Best Actress	Nominated	
Luna Awards	2007	Don't Give Up on Us	Best Actress	Nominated	
Luna Awards	2007	Kasal, Kasali, Kasalo	Best Actress	Won	
Luna Awards	2008	Sakal, Sakali, Saklolo	Best Actress	Nominated	
Luna Awards	2009	Ploning	Best Actress	Nominated	
Luna Awards	2009	Ploning	Best Picture	Nominated	
Luna Awards	2011	Hating Kapatid	Best Actress	Nominated	
Luna Awards	2020	Mindanao	Best Actress	Won	
Metro Manila Film Festival	1997	Nasaan Ang Puso?	Best Supporting Actress	Nominated	
Metro Manila Film Festival	1997	Babae	Best Actress	Nominated	
Metro Manila Film Festival	1998	Kasal-Kasalan... Sakalan	Best Actress	Nominated	
Metro Manila Film Festival	1999	Esperanza: The Movie	Best Actress	Nominated	
Metro Manila Film Festival	2004	Aishite Imasu 1941: Mahal Kita	Best Actress	Nominated	
Metro Manila Film Festival	2006	Kasal, Kasali, Kasalo	Best Actress	Won	
Metro Manila Film Festival	2007	Sakal, Sakali, Saklolo	Best Actress	Nominated	
Metro Manila Film Festival	2011	My House Husband: Ikaw Na!	Best Actress	Nominated	
Metro Manila Film Festival	2012	Si Agimat, si Enteng Kabisote at si Ako	Best Actress	Nominated	
Metro Manila Film Festival	2019	Mindanao	Best Actress	Won	
Metro Manila Film Festival	2024	Espantaho	Best Actress	Won	
National Commission for Culture and the Arts Ani ng Dangal Awards	2020	Mindanao	Cinema Award for International Recognition	Won	
National Commission for Culture and the Arts Ani ng Dangal Awards	2026	Espantaho	Cinema Award for International Recognition	Won	
Star Awards for Movies	2003	Magkapatid	Movie Supporting Actress of the Year	Nominated	
Star Awards for Movies	2005	Aishite Imasu 1941: Mahal Kita	Movie Actress of the Year	Nominated	
Star Awards for Movies	2007	Kasal, Kasali, Kasalo	Movie Actress of the Year	Won	
Star Awards for Movies	2008	Sakal, Sakali, Saklolo	Movie Actress of the Year	Nominated	
Star Awards for Movies	2009	Ploning	Movie of the Year	Nominated	
Star Awards for Movies	2009	Mag-ingat Ka Sa... Kulam	Movie Actress of the Year	Nominated	
Star Awards for Movies	2012	My House Husband: Ikaw Na!	Movie Actress of the Year	Nominated	
Star Awards for Movies	2014	Judy Ann Santos	Dekada Award	Won	
Star Awards for Movies	2017	Kusina	Movie Actress of the Year	Nominated	
Star Awards for Movies	2019	Ang Dalawang Mrs. Reyes	Movie Actress of the Year	Nominated	
Star Awards for Movies	2021	Mindanao	Movie Actress of the Year	Nominated	
Star Awards for Television	1998	Esperanza	Best Drama Actress	Nominated	
Star Awards for Television	2000	Maalaala Mo Kaya (Episode: "Karnabal")	Best Single Performance by an Actress	Nominated	
Star Awards for Television	2004	Basta't Kasama Kita	Best Drama Actress	Nominated	
Star Awards for Television	2005	Krystala	Best Drama Actress	Won	
Star Awards for Television	2006	Maalaala Mo Kaya (Episode: "Rosaryo")	Best Single Performance by an Actress	Nominated	
Star Awards for Television	2006	Sa Piling Mo	Best Drama Actress	Nominated	
Star Awards for Television	2008	Ysabella	Best Drama Actress	Nominated	
Star Awards for Television	2009	Maalaala Mo Kaya (Episode: "Lason")	Best Single Performance by an Actress	Nominated	
Star Awards for Television	2010	Habang May Buhay	Best Drama Actress	Nominated	
Star Awards for Television	2010	George and Cecil	Best Comedy Actress	Nominated	
Star Awards for Television	2013	Huwag Ka Lang Mawawala	Best Drama Actress	Nominated	
Star Awards for Television	2013	MasterChef Pinoy Edition	Best Reality Competition Show Host	Won	
Star Awards for Television	2014	Bet on Your Baby	Best Game Show Host	Won	
Star Awards for Television	2015	Maalaala Mo Kaya (Episode: "Ilog")	Best Single Performance by an Actress	Won	
Star Awards for Television	2021	Starla	Best Drama Actress	Nominated	

== See also ==
- Judy Ann Santos filmography
