= Anna Luna =

Anna Luna may refer to:

- Anna Luna (TV series), Philippine television drama
- Anna Luna (actress), Filipino actress
- Anna Paulina Luna, American politician
