= MasterChef Pinoy Edition season 1 =

MasterChef Pinoy Edition
- Season 1
- No. of episodes: 66

Release
- Original network: ABS-CBN
- Original release: November 12, 2012 – February 9, 2013

MasterChef Pinoy Edition was the Philippine version of the competitive cooking reality television series, MasterChef. The first season began on November 12, 2012, on ABS-CBN. The show was hosted by Judy Ann Santos-Agoncillo. Santos-Agoncillo was also joined by chefs Fernando Aracama, Rolando Laudico and JP Anglo as the judges of the show.

The finale, dubbed as MasterChef Pinoy Edition: The Live Cook-Off, was aired live on February 9, 2013, at the SM North EDSA Skydome in Quezon City. Kris Aquino and Richard Gomez helped Santos-Agoncillo and the three chef-judges in judging. JR Royol, a band vocalist from Benguet was proclaimed the winner of the show winning the million cash prize, a culinary scholarship from the Center of Asian Culinary Studies, and a kitchen showcase from Fujidenzo.

== Auditions ==
Cities in the Philippines where the auditions were held

Auditions were held nationwide.

Audition date	Audition venue	City
August 25, 2011	Marquee Mall	Angeles City
August 27, 2011	Amigo Terrace Hotel	Iloilo City, Iloilo
September 5, 2011	N Hotel	Cagayan de Oro, Misamis Oriental
September 7, 2011	Baguio Country Club	Baguio, Benguet
June 21, 2012	Oceana Events Place and Restaurant Seaside Boulevard	By the Bay – SM Mall of Asia, Pasay

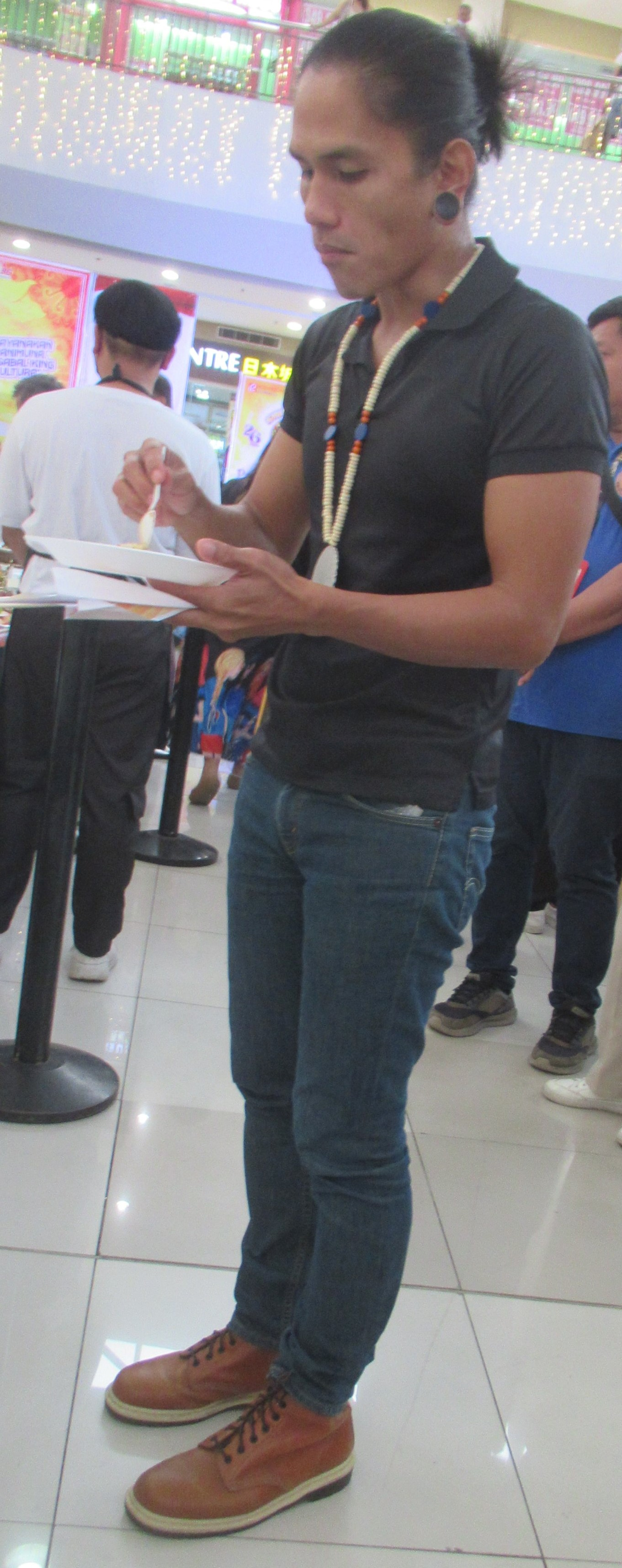
JR Royol

== Finalists and elimination results ==
Contestants	Age	Hometown	Occupation	Result	Source
JR Royol	29	Benguet	Band vocalist	Winner; February 9, 2013	
Carla Marcaida	41	Bulacan	Businesswoman	Runner-Up; February 9, 2013	
Ivory Yat	26	Quezon City	Nurse	Third place February 9, 2013	
Myra Santos	31	Muntinlupa	Accounting associate	Fourth place February 9, 2013	
Ronnel Torres	30	Pampanga	Sari-sari store owner	Eliminated; February 6, 2013	
Sonny Boy Tuazon	24	Bataan	Unemployed	Re-eliminated; February 6, 2013; Eliminated; December 4, 2012	
Reggie Apolinaro	30	Laguna	Call center agent	Eliminated; February 4, 2013	
Mac Serrano	39	Tarlac	Former seaman	Eliminated; January 21, 2013	
Maureen Angala	33	Muntinlupa	Housewife	Withdrew; January 18, 2013	
Gian Espadera	20	Davao City	Human Resource Management student	Eliminated; January 14, 2013	
Cons Osorio	30	San Juan City	Interior designer	Re-eliminated; January 10, 2013; Eliminated; December 7, 2012	
Betty Bais	43	Cebu City	House helper	Re-eliminated; January 10, 2013; Eliminated; December 24, 2012	
Lilibeth Nicolas	31	Quezon City	House helper	Re-eliminated; January 9, 2013; Eliminated; January 4, 2013	
Tolits Dulva	34	Sorsogon	Police	Re-eliminated; January 7, 2013; Eliminated; December 17, 2012	
Melissa Gutierrez	51	Quezon City	Marketing director	Withdrew; December 12, 2012	
Malou Caiña	41	Cagayan de Oro	Branch supervisor	Withdrew; December 6, 2012	
