= Ang Dalawang Mrs. Reyes =

2018 Filipino film by Jun Robles Lana

- Theatrical poster
- Directed by: Jun Robles Lana
- Screenplay by: Jun Robles Lana; Elmer L. Gatchalian
- Story by: Jun Robles Lana
- Produced by: Charo Santos-Concio; Malou N. Santos; Josabeth Alonso; Perci Intalan
- Starring: Judy Ann Santos; Angelica Panganiban
- Cinematography: Tey Clamor
- Edited by: Maynard Pattaui; Edlyn Tallada-Abuel
- Music by: Emerzon Texon
- Production companies: ABS-CBN Film Productions; Quantum Films; The IdeaFirst Company
- Distributed by: Star Cinema
- Release date: January 17, 2018
- Running time: 104 minutes
- Country: Philippines
- Language: Filipino
- Box office: ₱150 million

Ang Dalawang Mrs. Reyes (transl. The Two Mrs. Reyeses) is a 2018 Filipino comedy film directed by Jun Robles Lana from his written story and screenplay, with Elmer L. Gatchalian as the co-writer of the latter. The film stars Angelica Panganiban and Judy Ann Santos as a pair of devoted wives who find their husbands to be in a secret, gay relationship. It also stars Gladys Reyes, Carmi Martin, JC de Vera, and Joross Gamboa.

A co-production of Star Cinema, Quantum Films, and The IdeaFirst Company, the film was theatrically released on January 17, 2018, and is Star Cinema's opening salvo for 2018 and the first film to pair Santos with Panganiban whom she last worked with in the 2001 soap opera Sa Puso Ko, Iingatan Ka. It also marks the reunion of Santos and Reyes, who were the original lead stars of Mara Clara.

== Cast ==
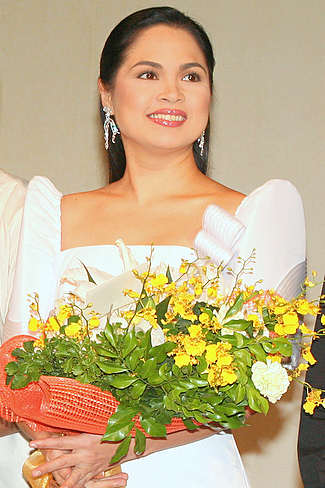
Judy Ann Santos portrays Lianne Reyes.

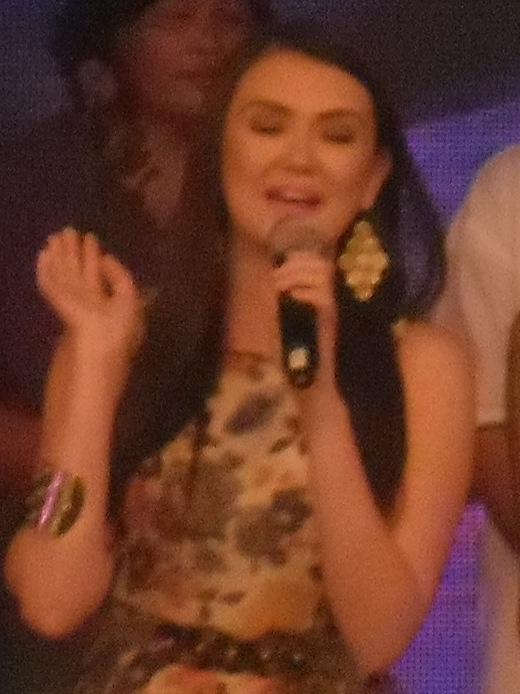
Angelica Panganiban portrays Cindy Reyes.

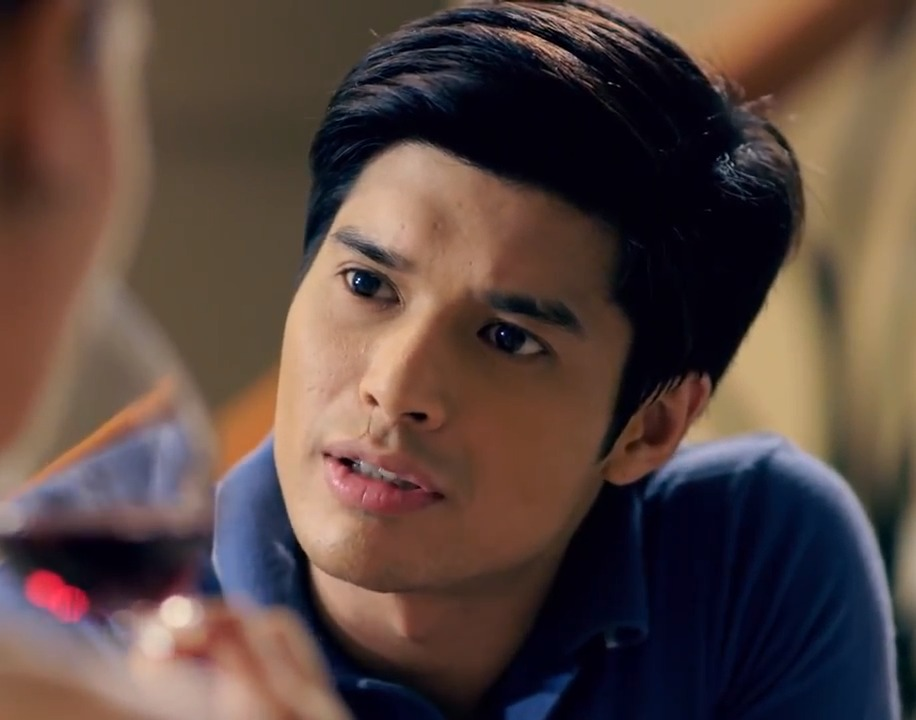
JC de Vera portrays Felix Reyes.

=== Lead Cast ===
- Judy Ann Santos as Lianne Reyes
- Angelica Panganiban as Cindy Reyes
- JC de Vera as Felix Reyes
- Joross Gamboa as Gary Reyes
- Gladys Reyes as Betsy Reyes
- Carmi Martin as Amanda Reyes
- Nico Antonio as Steve Reyes
- Andrea Brillantes as Macey Reyes
- Kim Molina as Aira
- Cai Cortez as Baby
- Quark Henares as Gilbert
- Wilma Doesnt as Martina

== Awards and nominations ==
2019 Box Office Entertainment Awards

- Winner – Comedy Actress of the Year (Judy Ann Santos & Angelica Panganiban)

FAMAS Award (Nomination)

- Best Actress – (Judy Ann Santos)
- Best Picture – (Jun Lana)

3rd EDDYS AWARDS (Nomination)

- Best Actress – (Judy Ann Santos)
- Best Supporting Actor – (Joross Gamboa)

37th Luna Award (Nomination)

- Best Editing (Maynard Pattaui and Edlyn Tallada-Abuel)

PMPC Star Awards for Movies (Nomination)

- Movie Actress of the Year – (Judy Ann Santos)
- Movie of the Year – (Jun Lana)
- Movie Screenwriter of the Year (Jun Lana)
- Movie Production Designer of the Year (Marxie Maolen Fadul)
- Movie Editor of the Year (Maynard Pattaui)
- Movie Musical Scorer (Emerzon Texon)
- Movie Sound Engineer of the Year (Lamberto Casas Jr and Albert Michael Idioma)
