= Agot Isidro =

Filipino singer and actress

- Born: Maria Margarita Amada Fteha Isidro; Marikina, Rizal, Philippines
- Occupations: Actress singer
- Years active: 1990–present
- Spouse: Manu Sandejas (m. 2000; ann. 2010)

Agot Isidro (born Maria Margarita Amada Fteha Isidro) is a Filipino actress and singer. Known for her work in independent productions and theater, she began her career in the early 1990s as a background singer and later branched into acting on screen and stage, including Tulad ng Dati (2006), Huling Pasada (2008), Mga Mumunting Lihim (2012), Mga Anino ng Kahapon (2013), Changing Partners (2017), Family Matters (2022) and Ang Duyan ng Magiting (2023). Her accolades include a FAMAS Award and a Metro Manila Film Festival Award, in addition to nominations for five Gawad Urian and three Luna Awards.

== Early life ==
Agot Isidro was born as Maria Margarita Amada Fteha Isidro in Marikina, Rizal, where she was raised. She is fourth among six children of Jose Isidro, an architect, and Palestinian mother Edwarta Fteha, and is their youngest daughter. Her grandfather, Narciso G. Isidro, was a Marikina businessman, film producer and former municipal councilor.

She considered herself as "daddy's girl", and growing up, she never saw herself as beautiful because of her ethnic features as a child. Isidro was skinny, dark-skinned (brown), black hair, and has knobby knees compared to her siblings who were light-skinned and brown-haired. Because of her looks, she was teased a lot by her siblings and relatives, which left her emotionally scarred.

After graduating from college in UP Diliman, she left home and pursued a degree in Fashion Buying and Merchandising in the prestigious Fashion Institute of Technology in New York City. New Yorkers were fascinated by her ethnic features, which gave Isidro a boost of confidence and self-esteem. Living alone, she felt homesick and struggled to make ends meet with her allowance given by her parents. However, Isidro was determined to prove that she could live alone in the Big Apple. She focused on school and graduated magna cum laude.

Isidro entered show business at age 25. She was given the title as "crush ng bayan" or "people's crush" because of her girl-next-door persona. Isidro continued to rise as a talent and was given numerous projects including recording albums, movies, television, and theater.

== Education ==
She graduated from the University of the Philippines Diliman with a bachelor's degree in interior design. Isidro also pursued Fashion Buying and Merchandising at Fashion Institute of Technology in New York City, where she graduated as magna cum laude. She also has a master's degree in communication from the Ateneo de Manila University.

== Filmography ==
=== Film ===
Year	Title	Role
1993	Masahol Pa sa Hayop	Atty. Joan Sanchez
1993	May Minamahal	Trina
1994	Pangako ng Kahapon	Elizabeth
1994	Kalabog en Bosyo	
1995	The Lilian Velez Story: Till Death Do Us Part	
1996	Oki Doki Doc: The Movie	Alex
1997	I Do? I Die! (D'yos Ko Day!)	Helena Mendiola
1997	Da Best in Da West 2 (Da Western Pulis Istori)	Leah
1997	Ipaglaban Mo: The Movie II	
1998	April, May, June	April
2006	Tulad ng Dati	Beth Pangan
2007	Nars	Marissa
2008	Huling Pasada	
2008	A Very Special Love	Miggy's mother
2009	Patient X	Myrna
2009	Ang Darling Kong Aswang	Ayah
2011	Way Back Home	Amelia "Amy" Santiago
2011	Yesterday, Today, Tomorrow	Agnes
2011	My House Husband: Ikaw Na!	Cynthia
2012	Mga Mumunting Lihim	Sandra
2012	Sosy Problems	Glory
2012	One More Try	Marga
2013	Mga Anino ng Kahapon	Irene
2015	All You Need Is Pag-ibig	Jessica
2016	Ang Babae sa Septic Tank 2: #ForeverIsNotEnough	Herself
2017	Changing Partners	Alex
2017	Carlo J. Caparas' Ang Panday	(Cameo role)
2018	Recipe for Love	Mona Marcelo
2020	Death of Nintendo	
2020	Motel Acacia	Angeli
2020	Magikland	
2021	On the Job: The Missing 8	Senator Alice Samson
2021	Love at First Stream	Rosario Ramirez
2022	Family Matters	Odette
2023	Rookie	Coach Jules
2023	Ang Duyan ng Magiting	Jose's mother
2023	Ten Little Mistresses	Helga
2023	Essential Truths of the Lake	Colonel
2023	Becky & Badette	Nirvana Batungbakal
2026	Ganito, Ganyan, Ganoon	Paz

=== Television ===
Year	Title	Role	Ref(s)
1990	The Sharon Cuneta Show		
1990–1995	Sa Linggo nAPO Sila	Herself (host)	
1991	Mana Mana	Agot	
1993	Oki Doki Doc	Alexandra "Alex" Macunatan	
1993	GMA Telecine Specials	Various roles	
1993	Spotlight Presents: Agot Isidro	Various roles	
1995	Maalaala Mo Kaya: Lupa	Kristina	
1995–1998	'Sang Linggo nAPO Sila	Herself (host)	
1996	Star Drama Presents: Agot	Various Roles	
1997–2002	!Oka Tokat	Rona Catacutan del Fierro	
2003	Wansapanataym: Hansel, Gretel and Ethel	Witch	
2004	Marina	Sheila Corrales-Sandico / Dugyot	
2005–2006	Search for the Star in a Million	Herself (judge)	
2006–2007	Komiks Presents: Da Adventures of Pedro Penduko	Bukang Liwayway	
2007	Komiks Presents: Si Pedro Penduko at ang mga Engkantao	Reyna Bukang Liwayway	
2007	Rounin	Naya	
2008	Maalaala Mo Kaya: Mansyon	Lina	
2008	Lobo	Nessa Blancaflor-Raymundo	
2009	Tayong Dalawa	Ingrid Martinez-Garcia / Ingrid Martinez-Cardenas	
2010	Tanging Yaman	Marcela Policarpio	
2010	1DOL	Laura Suarez	
2011	Agimat: Ang Mga Alamat ni Ramon Revilla: Bianong Bulag	Veronica Gutierrez	
2011	Minsan Lang Kita Iibigin	Young Remedios Sebastiano	
2011	100 Days to Heaven	Diana	
2011–2012	Nasaan Ka, Elisa?	Dana Altamira	
2012	E-Boy	Ria Villareal	
2012	One True Love	Leila Samonte	
2012–2013	Paroa: Ang Kuwento ni Mariposa	Amalia de Guzman	
2013	Indio	Linang	
2013	Vampire ang Daddy Ko	Adelle	
2013	Magpakailanman: Sex for Sale	Norma Diwa	
2013	Muling Buksan ang Puso	Carissa Beltran-dela Vega	
2013	Titser	Sandra	
2014	Carmela: Ang Pinakamagandang Babae sa Mundong Ibabaw	Amanda Fernandez	
2014–2015	Bagito	Sylvia Samson-Lorenzo	
2015–2017	FPJ's Ang Probinsyano	Verna Syquia-Tuazon	
2018	Asintado	Hillary Gonzales-del Mundo	
2019	Sino ang Maysala?	Dolores Miranda	
2019	Maalaala Mo Kaya: Passport	Angela Wilson	
2019	Call Me Tita	Celine Hontiveros	
2020–2022	La Vida Lena	Vanessa Rubio-Narcisco	
2021	Love Beneath the Stars	Faye Cruz	
2022	2 Good 2 Be True	Atty. Roma Badayos	
2022	Flower of Evil	Carmen del Rosario	
2022	Lyric and Beat	Viola Espiritu	
2023–2024	Can't Buy Me Love	Cindy Young-Tiu	
2025	Incognito	Isabel Escalera	
2025	It's Okay to Not Be Okay	Nurse Eden / Ingrid Hernandez	
2026	Blood vs Duty	Pres. Natalia Mendoza	

=== Music video appearances ===
Year	Title	Performer	Director	Ref.
2020	Nakikinig Ka Ba Sa Akin	Ben&Ben	Jorel Lising	

== Theater ==
Isidro made her theatrical debut in August 2003 with Honk!, a musical inspired by Hans Christian Andersen's "The Ugly Duckling." Isidro played Ida, the mother of the "ugly duckling" played by Rajo Laurel. The musical was under Trumpets Production and was directed by Chari Arespacochaga. Honk! was held at the Meralco Theater on August 1 till September 7, 2003.

After her Honk! debut, Isidro starred in Atlantis Production's "Baby The Musical" in August 2004. She played Pam Sakarian, a basketball coach in her 30s opposite Jett Pangan, who played her husband Nick Sakarian. The story involves the couple's struggle to conceive after being married for two years. The couple found out that Pam was pregnant but later realized that it was the wrong Mrs. Sakarian, Nick's sister-in-law. The play was directed by Bobby Garcia and was held at the Meralco Theater.

== Discography ==
=== Albums ===
- Sa Isip Ko (1993)
- Hush (1995)
- The Best of Agot Isidro (1996)
- Winds Of Change (1997)
- Best in Me (1999)
- The Island (2006)
- Silver Series (2006)
- White Lace and Promises (2009)

=== Singles ===
- "Everyday" (1994)
- "Sa Isip Ko"
- "Beginning Today"
- "Sandali na Lang"
- "Loving You"

== Accolades ==
Year	Award-giving body	Category	Nominated work	Result
2007	31st Gawad Urian Awards	Best Supporting Actress	Tulad ng Dati	Nominated
2009	33rd Gawad Urian Awards	Best Supporting Actress	Huling Pasada	Nominated
2009	23rd PMPC Star Awards for TV	Best Drama Actress	Tayong Dalawa	Nominated
2009	35th Metro Manila Film Festival	Best Supporting Actress	Ang Darling Kong Aswang	Nominated
2011	8th Cinemalaya Independent Film Festival–Director's Showcase	Best Actress / Supporting Actress (with Judy Ann Santos, Iza Calzado and Janice de Belen)	Mga Mumunting Lihim	Won
2013	39th Metro Manila Film Festival	New Wave Best Actress	Mga Anino ng Kahapon	Won
2013	ENPRESS Golden Screen Awards	Best Performance by an Actress in a Leading Role (Drama)	Mga Mumunting Lihim	Nominated
2013	37th Gawad Urian Awards	Best Actress	Mga Anino ng Kahapon	Nominated
2014	Golden Screen TV Awards	Outstanding Performance by an Actress in a Single Drama/Telemovie Program	Magpakailanman	Nominated
2015	29th PMPC Star Awards for Television	Best Single Performance by an Actress	Maalaala Mo Kaya: Hat	Nominated
2017	Cinema One Originals Digital Film Festival	Best Actress	Changing Partners	Won
2018	FAMAS Awards	Best Actress	Changing Partners	Won
2018	PMPC Star Awards for Movies	Movie Actress of the Year	Changing Partners	Nominated
2018	FAP Awards	Best Actress	Changing Partners	Nominated
2018	Gawad Urian Awards	Best Actress	Changing Partners	Nominated
2019	FAMAS Awards	Best Supporting Actress	Kung Paano Siya Nawala	Nominated
2019	FAP Awards	Best Actress	Changing Partners	Nominated
2021	Entertainment Editors' Choice Awards	Best Supporting Actress	Motel Acacia	Nominated
2022	PMPC Star Awards for Movies	Movie Supporting Actress of the Year	Death of Nintendo	Nominated
2022	Society of Filipino Film Reviewers	Best Ensemble Performance	On the Job: The Missing 8	Won
2023	FAP Awards	Best Supporting Actress	Family Matters	Nominated
2023	Society of Filipino Film Reviewers	Best Ensemble Performance	Family Matters	Won
2023	Metro Manila Film Festival	Best Supporting Actress	Becky and Badette	Nominated
2023	Cinemalaya Independent Film Festival	Best Ensemble Acting	Ang duyan ng magiting	Won
2024	Society of Filipino Film Reviewers	Best Ensemble Performance	Ang duyan ng magiting	Won
2024	Gawad Urian Awards	Best Supporting Actress (Pinakamahusay na Pangalawang Aktres)	Ang duyan ng magiting	Nominated
