= Junior MasterChef Pinoy Edition =

2011–12 Philippine television reality cooking show

- Genre: Competitive cooking show
- Written by: Peng Belase
- Directed by: Connie Macatuno
- Presented by: Judy Ann Santos-Agoncillo
- Judges: Fern Aracama; Rolando Laudico; JP Anglo
- Music by: Lennel Diaz
- Opening theme: "Bilib na Bilib" by Maria Aragon
- Composer: Jimmy Antiporda
- Country of origin: Philippines
- Original language: Filipino
- No. of episodes: 47 (list of episodes)

Production
- Executive producers: Jov Aberion; Gab Amaron; Chloe Bautista; Francisco Nicanor; Anna Rivera
- Editors: Becar Balbalosa; Peterson Polillo; Raymond Samaniego; Maika Topacio; Cindy Riego; Sheila Tiglao; Earl Illustrisimo; Alexces Megan Abarquez
- Running time: 1 hour
- Production companies: ABS-CBN Studios; Reveille Productions; One Potato Two Potato

Original release
- Network: ABS-CBN
- Release: August 27, 2011 – February 18, 2012

Related
- Junior MasterChef MasterChef; MasterChef Pinoy Edition (2012)

Junior MasterChef Pinoy Edition is a Philippine competitive cooking game show broadcast by ABS-CBN. The show is based from the British television show Junior MasterChef, in turn was a spin-off based on MasterChef, featuring Filipino contestants aged 8 to 12. It aired on the network's Yes Weekend line up from August 27, 2011 to February 18, 2012, replacing The Price Is Right and was replaced by the fourth season of Kapamilya, Deal or No Deal and Sarah G. Live.

Judy Ann Santos-Agoncillo presented the show, while professional Filipino chefs Fern Aracama, Rolando Laudico, and JP Anglo judged the contestants.

On September 24, ABS-CBN announced the show would move to a new time slot on Sundays starting on October 2, 2011.

The show ended on February 18, 2012 with Kyle Imao as the winner.

== Primer ==
The pre-series primer entitled The Appetizer aired on 20 August 2011. It featured the basic format of the show, while being introduced by the presenter and chef judges. Viewers also got to take an eyewitness look at the auditions, and the narrow down to the Top 60.

== Episodes ==
| Series | Episodes | Originally released | |
| Series | Episodes | First released | Last released |
|---|---|---|---|
| 1 | 47 | 20 August 2011 | 18 February 2012 |

== Top 20 ==
| Contestant | Current Points/Status (As of 18 February 2012) |
|---|---|
| Kyle Imao, 12, Marikina | Winner |
| Philip Amarillo, 13^{1}, Cebu | Runner-Up |
| Maria Kristina "Mika" Tanaka, 10, Quezon City | 3rd Place |
| Antonio "Jobim" Jalbuena, 12, Makati | 4th Place |
| Louise Emmanuelle Mabulo, 12, Naga City | Re-eliminated 12 February 12; Returned 21 January 2012; Eliminated 12 November 2011 |
| Caitlin Faye Taluban, 11, Quezon City | Eliminated 12 February 2012 |
| Mikkel Gabriel "Miko" Manzano , 11, Caloocan | Eliminated 4 February 2012 |
| Pomeleigh May "Acee" Salangsang, 11, General Santos | Eliminated 4 February 2012 |
| Bianca Franchesca Dimapilis, 9, Antipolo | Re-eliminated 29 January 2012; Returned 21 January 2012; Eliminated 18 December 2011 |
| Iain Johnston, 12, Baguio | Re-eliminated 29 January 2012; Returned 21 January 2012; Eliminated 10 December 2011 |
| Athena Garcia, 11, Baguio | Re-eliminated 29 January 2012; Returned 21 January 2012; Eliminated 9 October 2011 |
| Emmanuel "Emman" Buquid, 11, Muntinlupa | Re-eliminated 28 January 2012; Returned 21 January 2012; Eliminated 15 January 2012 |
| Maria Josefina Beatriz "Bea" Atienza, 11, Davao | Re-eliminated 28 January 2012; Returned 21 January 2012; Eliminated 9 October 2011 |
| Beatrice Anne "Tricia" Baylosis, 11, Batangas | Re-eliminated 22 January 2012; Returned 21 January 2012; Eliminated 27 November 2011 |
| Maria Judel Bautista, 10, Quezon City | Re-eliminated 22 January 2012; Returned 21 January 2012; Eliminated 29 October 2011 |
| Nadine Mosh Lee Oliver, 10, Naga | Re-eliminated 21 January 2012; Returned 21 January 2012; Eliminated 12 November 2011 |
| Gerardo Angel "Gino" Yang, 11, Muntinlupa | Eliminated 21 January 2012; Returned 21 January 2012 |
| Gerardo Angel "Gino" Yang, 11, Muntinlupa | Withdrew 23 October 2011^{2} |
| Don Patrick Baldosano, 12, Parañaque | Eliminated 7 January 2012 |
| Jean Gilbert Go, 12, Quezon City | Eliminated 12 November 2011 |
| Jazette "Inday" Lee, 10, Iloilo | Eliminated 29 October 2011 |

Legend:
The kiddie cook is the winner.
The kiddie cooks are the runners-up.
The kiddie cook was eliminated/re-eliminated from the competition.
The kiddie cook voluntarily quit the competition.

Notes:

^Note 1 – Philip Amarillo was 12 years old, the maximum age for the kiddie cooks, during his audition for the show last February 2011. Afterwards, he turned 13 on 16 July 2011.
^Note 2 – Gino Yang voluntarily quit the show to participate in an international culinary summer camp in China, where his application had been approved.

== Elimination chart ==
| | 1 | | | | | 2 | | | | | 3 | | | | | | 4 | | | | | 5 | | | | | 6 | | | | | 7 | | | | | 8 | | | | | 9 | | | | | | | 10 | | | 11 | | | 12 | | | |
| | 1 | | | | | 2 | | | | | 3 | | | | | | 4 | | | | | 5 | | | | | 6 | | | | | 7 | | | | | 8 | | | | | Wildcard | | | | | | | 10 | | | 11 | | | Finale | | | |
|---|---|---|---|---|---|---|---|---|---|---|---|---|---|---|---|---|---|---|---|---|---|---|---|---|---|---|---|---|---|---|---|---|---|---|---|---|---|---|---|---|---|---|---|---|---|---|---|---|---|---|---|---|---|---|---|---|---|---|
| Mystery Box Challenge Winner(s) | Miko | | | | | Patrick | | | | | Philip | | | | | | Miko | | | | | none | | | | | Mika | | | | | Acee, Miko, Philip | | | | | Jobim | | | | | Athena, Bea, Bianca; Emman, Iain, Judel; Louise, Tricia | | | | | | | | | | Kyle | | | | | | |
| Invention Test Winner(s) | Kyle | | | | | Gilbert; Louise | | | | | Emman; Patrick; Philip | | | | | | Bianca | | | | | Kyle | | | | | Miko | | | | | Caitlin, Mika, Patrick | | | | | Philip | | | | | Athena, ~~Bea~~, Bianca; ~~Emman~~, Iain, Louise | | | | | | | Acee, Kyle, Miko, Philip Kyle | | | | | | | | | |
| Team Challenge Winners | Acee, Bianca, Gilbert, Jobim, Kyle, Miko, Nadine, Patrick, Philip, Tricia | | | | | Acee, Bianca; Caitlin, Inday; Judel, Louise; Nadine, Patrick; Trica | | | | | Acee, Caitlin; Emman, Jobim; Miko, Nadine; Patrick, Philip | | | | | | Caitlin, Iain; Kyle, Miko; Mika, Philip | | | | | (Team Ch 1); Acee, Caitlin, Miko; Patrick, Philip (Team Ch 2); Caitlin, Iain, Kyle, Patrick, Philip | | | | | Bianca, Emman, Mika, Patrick, Philip | | | | | Emman, Jobim, Kyle | | | | | Caitlin, Jobim | | | | | Athena, Bianca, Iain, Louise | | | | | | | | | | Kyle, Mika, Philip | | | | | | |
| Catch-Up Challenge Winner | Gino | | | | | Caitlin | | | | | Philip | | | | | | Patrick | | | | | Kyle | | | | | Emman | | | | | Emman, Jobim, Kyle | | | | | Acee | | | | | Louise | | | | | | | | | | | | | | | | |
| Contestants | MB | IT | TM | PT | TL | MB | IT | TM | PT | TL | MB | IT | TM | PT | TL | | MB | IT | TM | PT | TL | TM | IT | TM | PT | TL | MB | TM | IT | PT | TL | MB | IT | TM | PT | TL | MB | IT | TM | PT | TL | MB | | IT | IT | TM | TL | | IT | IT | TL | TM | MB | TL | IT | IT | TL | Result |
| Kyle | 1 | 6 | 6 | 2 | 15 | 2 | 1 | 3 | 1 | 22 | 1 | 1 | 3 | 2 | 29 | Top 12 | 1 | 1 | 6 | 1 | 9 | 3 | 6 | 6 | 6 | 30 | 1 | 3 | 2 | 1 | 37 | 2 | 4 | 6 | 6 | 18 | 4 | 2 | 1 | 1 | 8 | | | | | | | Top 8 | 6 | 6 | 12 | 6 | 6 | 12 | 44.8 | 47 | 91.8 | Winner |
| Philip | 1 | 1 | 6 | 1 | 9 | 1 | 1 | 3 | 1 | 15 | 6 | 6 | 6 | 6 | 39 | Top 12 | 1 | 1 | 6 | 1 | 9 | 6 | 1 | 6 | 1 | 23 | 1 | 6 | 1 | 1 | 32 | 6 | 2 | 2 | 4 | 14 | 1 | 6 | 2 | 1 | 10 | | | | | | | Top 8 | 6 | 1 | 7 | 6 | 4 | 10 | 42.1 | 49 | 91.1 | 2nd Place |
| Mika | 1 | 1 | 3 | 1 | 6 | 4 | 1 | 3 | 1 | 15 | 1 | 4 | 3 | 4 | 27 | Top 12 | 1 | 1 | 6 | 1 | 9 | 3 | 1 | 3 | 1 | 17 | 6 | 6 | 1 | 1 | 31 | 4 | 6 | 4 | 2 | 16 | 1 | 1 | 4 | 2 | 8 | | | | | | | Top 8 | 3 | 1 | 4 | 6 | 1 | 7 | 42 | 42 | 84 | 3rd Place |
| Jobim | 1 | 1 | 6 | 1 | 9 | 1 | 4 | 3 | 4 | 21 | 1 | 4 | 6 | 1 | 33 | Top 12 | 1 | 1 | 3 | 4 | 9 | 3 | 2 | 1 | 4 | 19 | 4 | 3 | 1 | 1 | 28 | 2 | 4 | 6 | 6 | 18 | 6 | 1 | 6 | 4 | 17 | | | | | | | Top 8 | 3 | 2 | 5 | 3 | 1 | 4 | 36.4 | 37 | 73.4 | 4th Place |
| Louise | 2 | 1 | 3 | 1 | 7 | 1 | 6 | 6 | 1 | 21 | 2 | 1 | 3 | 1 | 28 | Eliminated (Episode 19) | | | | | | | | | | | | | | | | | | | | | | | | | | IN | | IN | IN | IN | 93 | Top 8 | 3 | 1 | 4 | 3 | 2 | 5 | Re-eliminated (Episode 46) | | | |
| Caitlin | 1 | 2 | 3 | 1 | 7 | 1 | 1 | 6 | 6 | 21 | 1 | 1 | 6 | 1 | 30 | Top 12 | 1 | 1 | 6 | 1 | 9 | 6 | 1 | 6 | 1 | 23 | 2 | 3 | 1 | 1 | 30 | 4 | 6 | 4 | 2 | 16 | 1 | 1 | 6 | 1 | 9 | | | | | | | Top 8 | 3 | 4 | 7 | 3 | 1 | 4 | Eliminated (Episode 46) | | | |
| Acee | 1 | 1 | 6 | 1 | 9 | 1 | 4 | 6 | 1 | 21 | 1 | 1 | 6 | 1 | 30 | Top 12 | 2 | 1 | 3 | 1 | 7 | 6 | 1 | 3 | 2 | 19 | 1 | 3 | 1 | 2 | 26 | 6 | 2 | 2 | 4 | 14 | 2 | 4 | 4 | 6 | 16 | | | | | | | Top 8 | 6 | 1 | 7 | Eliminated (Episode 44) | | | | | | |
| Miko | 6 | 1 | 6 | 1 | 14 | 1 | 1 | 3 | 1 | 20 | 1 | 2 | 6 | 1 | 30 | Top 12 | 6 | 1 | 6 | 2 | 15 | 6 | 1 | 3 | 1 | 26 | 1 | 3 | 6 | 1 | 37 | 6 | 2 | 2 | 4 | 14 | 1 | 1 | 2 | 1 | 5 | | | | | | | Top 8 | 6 | 1 | 7 | Eliminated (Episode 44) | | | | | | |
| Emman | 1 | 1 | 3 | 1 | 6 | 1 | 1 | 3 | 1 | 12 | 4 | 6 | 6 | 1 | 29 | Top 12 | 1 | 1 | 3 | 1 | 6 | 3 | 1 | 3 | 1 | 14 | 1 | 6 | 1 | 6 | 28 | 2 | 4 | 6 | 6 | 18 | 1 | 1 | 1 | 1 | 4 | Eliminated (Ep 38) | IN | IN | OUT | Re-eliminated (Episode 41) | | | | | | | | | | | | |
| Patrick | 1 | 1 | 6 | 1 | 9 | 6 | 1 | 6 | 1 | 23 | 1 | 6 | 6 | 1 | 37 | Top 12 | 1 | 2 | 3 | 6 | 12 | 6 | 4 | 6 | 1 | 29 | 1 | 6 | 4 | 4 | 44 | 4 | 6 | 4 | 2 | 16 | Eliminated (Episode 35) | | | | | | | | | | | | | | | | | | | | | |
| Bianca | 4 | 1 | 6 | 1 | 12 | 1 | 1 | 1 | 6 | 21 | 1 | 2 | 3 | 1 | 28 | Top 12 | 1 | 6 | 3 | 1 | 11 | 3 | 1 | 3 | 1 | 19 | 1 | 6 | 1 | 1 | 28 | Eliminated (Episode 30) | | | | | | | | | | IN | | IN | IN | IN | 83 | Re-eliminated (Episode 42) | | | | | | | | | | |
| Iain | 1 | 4 | 3 | 1 | 9 | 1 | 1 | 3 | 1 | 15 | 1 | 4 | 3 | 1 | 24 | Top 12 | 4 | 1 | 6 | 1 | 12 | 3 | 1 | 6 | 1 | 23 | Eliminated (Episode 27) | | | | | | | | | | | | | | | IN | | IN | IN | IN | 84 | Re-eliminated (Episode 42) | | | | | | | | | | |
| Tricia | 1 | 1 | 6 | 4 | 12 | 1 | 2 | 6 | 2 | 23 | 1 | 1 | 3 | 1 | 29 | Top 12 | 1 | 4 | 3 | 1 | 9 | Eliminated (Episode 23) | | | | | | | | | | | | | | | | | | | | IN | | OUT | Re-eliminated (Episode 40) | | | | | | | | | | | | | |
| Nadine | 1 | 1 | 6 | 1 | 9 | 1 | 1 | 6 | 1 | 18 | 1 | 2 | 6 | 1 | 28 | Eliminated (Episode 19) | | | | | | | | | | | | | | | | | | | | | | | | | | OUT | | Re-eliminated (Episode 39) | | | | | | | | | | | | | | |
| Gilbert | 1 | 1 | 6 | 1 | 9 | 1 | 6 | 3 | 1 | 20 | 1 | 1 | 3 | 1 | 26 | Eliminated (Episode 19) | | | | | | | | | | | | | | | | | | | | | | | | | | | | | | | | | | | | | | | | | | |
| Judel | 1 | 1 | 3 | 1 | 6 | 1 | 1 | 6 | 1 | 15 | Eliminated (Episode 15) | | | | | | | | | | | | | | | | | | | | | | | | | | | | | | | IN | | OUT | Re-eliminated (Episode 40) | | | | | | | | | | | | | |
| Inday | 1 | 1 | 3 | 1 | 6 | 1 | 1 | 6 | 1 | 15 | Eliminated (Episode 15) | | | | | | | | | | | | | | | | | | | | | | | | | | | | | | | | | | | | | | | | | | | | | | | |
| Gino | 1 | 1 | 3 | 6 | 11 | 1 | 2 | 3 | 1 | 18 | Quit (Episode 14) | | | | | | | | | | | | | | | | | | | | | | | | | | | | | | | OUT | | Eliminated (Episode 39) | | | | | | | | | | | | | | |
| Athena | 1 | 1 | 3 | 1 | 6 | Eliminated (Episode 10) | | | | | | | | | | | | | | | | | | | | | | | | | | | | | | | | | | | | IN | | IN | IN | IN | 85 | Re-eliminated (Episode 42) | | | | | | | | | | |
| Bea | 1 | 1 | 3 | 1 | 6 | Eliminated (Episode 10) | | | | | | | | | | | | | | | | | | | | | | | | | | | | | | | | | | | | IN | | IN | OUT | Re-eliminated (Episode 41) | | | | | | | | | | | | |
| Notes | ^{1} | none | ^{2} | ^{3} | | none | ^{4} | none | | ^{5} | ^{6} | ^{7} | none | | ^{6} | | ^{8} | none | | ^{9} | none | | | ^{10} | none | | | | | | ^{11} | none | | | | | | | | | | | | | | | | | | | | | | | | | | |
| Eliminated | Athena; First elimination | | | | | Inday | | | | | Gilbert Louise; First elimination Nadine; First elimination | | | | | | Tricia; First elimination | | | | | Iain; First elimination | | | | | Bianca; First elimination | | | | | Patrick | | | | | Emman; First elimination | | | | | Gino | | Judel; Re-elimination | Bea; Re-elimination | none | Athena; Re-elimination Bianca; Re-elimination Iain; Re-elimination | | Acee | | | Caitlin | | | Philip; 2nd Place Mika; 3rd Place Jobim; 4th Place | | | Kyle; Winner |
| Eliminated | Bea; First elimination | | | | | Judel; First elimination | | | | | Gilbert Louise; First elimination Nadine; First elimination | | | | | | Tricia; First elimination | | | | | Iain; First elimination | | | | | Bianca; First elimination | | | | | Patrick | | | | | Emman; First elimination | | | | | Nadine; Re-elimination | | Tricia; Re-elimination | Emman; Re-elimination | none | Athena; Re-elimination Bianca; Re-elimination Iain; Re-elimination | | Miko | | | Louise; Re-elimination | | | Philip; 2nd Place Mika; 3rd Place Jobim; 4th Place | | | Kyle; Winner |
| Withdrew | none | | | | | Gino | | | | | none | | | | | | none | | | | | | | | | | | | | | | | | | | | | | | | | | | | | | | | | | | | | | | | | |

Legend:
The kiddie cook is the winner of the competition/challenge.
The kiddie cook was one of the top entries in the individual challenge, but did not win.
The kiddie cook was part of the winning team in a team challenge.
The kiddie cook was part of the bottom 5/6/8 scoring contestants who were at risk of elimination, but was not eliminated.

Notes:

^Note 1: The top 20 chefs have cooked practical dish with accordance to the food allowance of an average Filipino family. The judges stated that the winner of the challenge will get 6 points and the other two of the best will get 4 and 2 points. Miko was hailed as the winner, with Bianca and Louise finishing in second and third place respectively. Miko therefore has the power to choose the main ingredient for the invention test.
^Note 2: The 20 Kiddie Cooks went to Barasoain Church for the next competition. They were divided into two teams, the Green Team and Yellow Team. Kyle won the last competition, so he will chose one of the kiddie cooks to join him - he picked Miko. Then Kyle distributed the clay pots to the other kiddie cooks to determine their teams. The top 20 were made to cook rice cakes. They chose 3 recipes for each team. Each team was also guided by an adviser on the cooking of rice cakes. Then, 100 churchgoers judged their rice cakes and plates were put on the table to determine the winner. The Green Team won, so they earned 6 points while the Yellow Team earned 3 points.
^Note 3: For elimination challenge, the bottom 6 kiddie cooks were tasked to cook their own version of the dish adobo.
^Note 4: Two winners are chosen.
^Note 5: The elimination challenge was a Pressure Test.
^Note 6: It was announced that three kiddie cooks will be eliminated this round.
^Note 7: The kiddie cooks were divided into 5 groups of three.
^Note 8: It was announced that only 1 kiddie cook will be eliminated this round.
^Note 9: It was announced that there would be a Bottom 8.
^Note 10: Jobim was absent during the Test/Challenge so he was given 1 point.
^Note 11: The elimination consisted of two parts: a Skills Test and an Invention Test.

== See also ==
- List of programs broadcast by ABS-CBN
- Junior MasterChef
- MasterChef
