= Judy Ann Santos =

Filipino actress (born 1978)

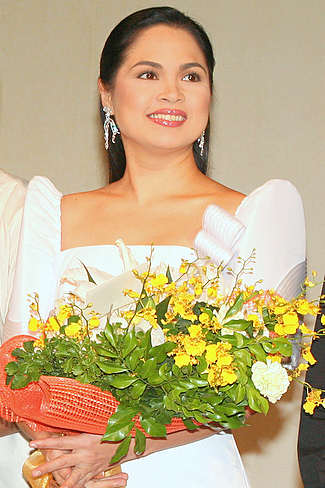
- Santos at the premiere of Ploning in 2008
- Born: Judy Anne Lumagui Santos; May 11, 1978 (age 48); Manila, Philippines
- Other name: Juday
- Occupations: Actress; film producer; restaurateur
- Years active: 1986–present
- Works: Full list
- Spouse: Ryan Agoncillo (m. 2009)
- Children: 3
- Awards: Full list

Judy Anne Lumagui Santos (born May 11, 1978) is a Filipino actress and film producer. Prolific in film and television in the Philippines, and is known for her dramatic and comedic roles in blockbusters and independent films, as well as for her portrayals of oppressed and impoverished women. She has received various accolades, including a Cairo International Film Festival Award, a Fantasporto International Film Festival Award, a Gawad Urian, two Luna Awards, three Metro Manila Film Festival Awards, and three FAMAS Awards.

Santos began her career as a child with supporting roles in film. At the age of ten, her first leading role was the title character in the children's television series Ula, Ang Batang Gubat (1988). Santos became more recognized when she and Gladys Reyes starred in the soap opera Mara Clara (1992). Her starring roles in the drama series Esperanza (1998), Sa Puso Ko, Iingatan Ka (2001), and Basta't Kasama Kita (2003) established her as a leading actress on primetime television. She received critical acclaim for her role as a woman with dissociative identity disorder in the psychological drama Sabel (2004), for which she won a Gawad Urian and Golden Screen Award for Best Actress.

Among her highest-grossing releases are the Jose Javier Reyes-directed comedy Kasal, Kasali, Kasalo (2006) and its sequel Sakal, Sakali, Saklolo (2007). Santos co-produced the independent drama Ploning (2008) and starred in Mindanao (2019), which were the Philippine submissions for Best International Feature Film at the 81st and 93rd Academy Awards, respectively. She is also a chef and a restaurateur. In 2015, she wrote a cookbook called Judy Ann's Kitchen, which won a Gourmand International's Cookbook Award for Best Authors and Chefs Outside Europe. Santos is married to Ryan Agoncillo, with whom she has three children.

== Early life and acting background ==
Judy Anne Lumagui Santos was born on May 11, 1978, in Manila, Philippines, to Carolina Lumagui (née Fontanela), a bank officer, and Manuel Dayrit Santos, a businessman and proprietor of the now defunct Victoria Supermart in Tanay, Rizal. She has two older siblings: Jeffrey and Jacqueline. The family soon moved to Antipolo, Rizal, where Santos's father worked. In 1986, her parents separated and the children lived with their mother. Three years later, Santos's mother left for Toronto, Canada. Santos and her siblings remained in the Philippines and lived with their nanny, Sabina "Binay" Quinatana, with whom she was close growing up, and moved to Quezon City where she attended elementary and high school.

At the age of eight, Santos began her professional acting career when she made her debut by portraying a minor role in the television series Kaming Mga Ulila (1986). She then unsuccessfully auditioned for the lead role in the soap opera Anna Luna (1989). Her career prospects improved when she was cast by director Argel Joseph, with whom she worked in Kaming Mga Ulila, to play the eponymous character in the children's television series Ula, Ang Batang Gubat (1988). She later appeared in several supporting roles in films, including Impaktita (1989), Regal Shocker: The Movie (1989), and Dyesebel (1990).

== Career ==
=== 1986–2003: Early work and breakthrough ===
Santos began her career performing as a child on film and television. Her first screen appearance was in a supporting role in the drama series Kaming Mga Ulila (1986) and she made her film debut with a minor role in Sana Mahalin Mo Rin Ako (1988), appearing alongside Nora Aunor and Tirso Cruz III. At age ten, Santos had her first leading role as the eponymous character in the children's television series Ula, Ang Batang Gubat (1988).

Santos's breakthrough came when she starred opposite Gladys Reyes in Mara Clara (1992), a show that aired until 1997, and is one of the longest-running Filipino television series. Santos reprised her role in the 1996 film adaptation and won the German Moreno Youth Achievement Award and Best New Movie Actress at the FAMAS Awards for her performance. That year, she starred in the teen series Gimik (1996) as part of an ensemble cast that included Marvin Agustin, Mylene Dizon, Diether Ocampo, and G. Toengi. After being typecast for previously playing impoverished roles, Santos struggled portraying the role of a socialite in the show. "It's totally out of my comfort zone. Everything about Dianne in Gimik is not me," she said. The following year, Santos left the series and had a reduced role in its 1999 film adaptation.

Esperanza (1997), in which she played the protagonist, was a turning point in Santos's career. She said that while the character is oppressed, she is braver and stands her ground. During its run, Esperanza received the highest Nielsen ratings for a television series episode with a reported 67 percent viewership. The show was later adapted as a film and earned Santos a nomination for Best Actress at the Metro Manila Film Festival. She then co-starred with Wowie de Guzman and Rico Yan in Paano ang Puso Ko? (1997). In 1999, Santos starred in the Judy Ann Drama Special, an installment of ABS-CBN's anthology series Star Drama Presents. She was the youngest actress featured in the television franchise. Next, she was cast opposite Fernando Poe Jr. in Isusumbong Kita sa Tatay Ko... (1999), which became the first Filipino film to gross over ₱100 million (US$1.9 million). Santos was awarded the Box Office Queen title at the 30th Box Office Entertainment Awards.

In 2000, Santos was cast alongside Leandro Muñoz and Piolo Pascual in the romantic drama Kahit Isang Saglit (2000). Pascual was in three releases with Santos from 2001 to 2003. In the first, she played the wife of Pascual's character in the television drama series Sa Puso Ko, Iingatan Ka (2001). Santos trained in boxing for her role in the Boots Plata-directed romantic comedy Bakit 'Di Totohanin (2001). She then starred in Joyce Bernal's comedy Till There Was You (2003) as a woman hired by a single father to pose as his wife. That same year, she appeared in the police procedural series Basta't Kasama Kita opposite Robin Padilla as a lawyer who gives up on her career to enlist as a National Bureau of Investigation (NBI) agent, which she found a "welcome change" from soap operas.

=== 2004–2007: Transition into adult roles and critical success ===
"As she continued to immerse in the difficult metamorphoses of her character, I realized how hard-working this young talent was, and how much justifiable pride she manifested in a job well done ... If ever, and if only, unapologetically transgressive women characters become a staple in local fiction, Santos' performance will serve as yardstick not because she was first, but because she made it memorable."

— The Philippine Star critic Joel David on Santos's performance in Sabel (2004)

Joel Lamangan cast Santos as a woman with dissociative identity disorder in the psychological drama Sabel (2004), whose script she found risky but necessary for artistic growth. The film required her to perform explicit sex scenes with co-stars Wendell Ramos and Sunshine Dizon. Santos's performance garnered critical acclaim; The Philippine Star described her portrayal as "multi-layered" and "one of the most complex female characters ever created for a Philippine film". Johven Velasco from The Manila Times praised Santos for challenging traditional gender roles of women and called the film the "turning point of her career". She won Best Actress at the Gawad Urian and Golden Screen Awards for the film. Santos next starred as the title character in the superhero series Krystala (2004). She considered the role to be a "childhood dream fulfilled", and trained in wushu and Muay Thai to prepare. Santos earned a Star Award for Best Actress for the series. Santos and Lamangan reunited in the period drama Aishite Imasu 1941: Mahal Kita playing a widow who becomes a guerilla leader. Santos said in regards to her decision to take up adult roles, "It was part of [my] desire to mature as an actor, to grow, and to establish my identity and versatility in the public's mind." Reviews of the film were mixed: Gibbs Cadiz from the Philippine Daily Inquirer criticized its "narrative incoherence and shockingly flippant grasp of history", but Rina Jimenez-David commended Santos for leaving her comfort zone with her role in Sabel. Santos received a Metro Manila Film Festival nomination for the film.

After a one-year absence on screen, Santos appeared in three productions in 2006. Her first release was Don't Give Up on Us, a romantic drama set in Baguio and Sagada that reunited her with Bernal and Pascual. Rito Asilo of the Philippine Daily Inquirer lauded Santos's growth in acting versatility and comedy, while Butch Francisco from The Philippine Star asserted that "more than the romance and this wonderful lecture on life ... it is her [Santos] acting discipline that helps make this film succeed as a light romantic drama." She returned to television in the drama series Sa Piling Mo. Santos's final release, Kasal, Kasali, Kasalo, ranks among the most acclaimed of her career. In Jose Javier Reyes's comedy drama, she starred opposite Ryan Agoncillo as the outspoken wife of Agoncillo's character, and the problems that arise as she interacts with her family and in-laws. Critic Nestor Torre Jr. wrote that Santos gave a "gutsy and felt performance", while Asilo praised her "honest-to-goodness portrayal", and said the film "strikes the appropriate emotional tone even as they juggle comedy and light drama". The film became her biggest commercial success to date, earning ₱140 million (US$2.6 million) at the box office. Santos was awarded the FAMAS, Golden Screen, Luna, Metro Manila Film Festival, and Star Award for Best Actress.

To prepare for her role as a vindictive chef in Ysabella (2007), Santos took a four-month culinary course at the Center for Asian Culinary Studies. Santos said working on the show helped "hone her skills in these two fields" and proved that she "can also do something aside from acting". She was later cast in Topel Lee's horror thriller Ouija (2007) alongside Jolina Magdangal, Iza Calzado, and Rhian Ramos. The film was met with mixed reviews; Philip Cu-Unjieng of The Philippine Star wrote, "There is nothing earth-shaking in the treatment of the material or the performances he [Lee] elicits from the ensemble." Jocelyn Dimaculangan, however, noted Santos's "restrained performance". Her final appearance that year was in the comedy drama Sakal, Sakali, Saklolo, the sequel to Kasal, Kasali, Kasalo. The response from critics was overwhelmingly negative; the Philippine Daily Inquirer's Nestor Torre Jr. dismissed the film for its "thrice-told plots and exhausted stellar performances", while Asilo stated that it "meanders into a list of issues that eventually clutter up its exposition and focus". Despite poor critical reception, the film grossed ₱122 million (US$2.3 million) at the box office.

=== 2008–2013: Established actress ===
Santos co-produced and starred in the independent drama Ploning (2008), which was the Philippine submission for Best Foreign Language Film at the 81st Academy Awards. Jimenez-David wrote that her performance showed "maturity and ripeness, a depth of character that hints at a life lived fully and well", and described the film as "moving, dazzling, and yet intimate and comforting". Santos said she considered taking the part as a "start of a new chapter" in her career. The film was screened at the Palm Springs International Film Festival, Newport Beach Film Festival, and Christopher B. Smith Rafael Film Center in the United States. Santos's next role in 2008 was in Jun Lana's psychological horror thriller Mag-ingat Ka Sa... Kulam as a woman who questions her own sanity after a car accident leaves her with amnesia. Critic Karen Caliwara commended Santos's "versatility" and considered her to be the film's prime asset. In 2009, Santos worked with Agoncillo and Javier Reyes for the third time in the sitcom George and Cecil, which explored a reversal of gender roles as Santos played a police officer married to a stay-at-home husband. Her only film appearance that year was in OMG (Oh, My Girl!).

Santos starred as nurse Jane Alcantara in Habang May Buhay, which premiered in February 2010. The role won her a KBP Golden Dove Award for Best Actress. She next appeared in the comedy Hating Kapatid. Leah Salterio of The Philippine Star wrote, "Judy Ann, of course, is better known for her dramatic prowess. Of late, however, it is her comic starrers that delivered the dough." In 2011, Santos served as a presenter in the reality television series Junior MasterChef Pinoy Edition. Her first venture outside of acting, Santos said: "I'm the one to balance [the chefs'] emotions. We don't want to hurt their feelings but we also need to be honest when it comes to the taste of their dishes. When they're about to cry, I have to be strong and raise their spirits. You have to be ready with words of encouragement for them." That same year, she starred in My House Husband: Ikaw Na!.

In 2012, Santos collaborated with Javier Reyes in Mga Mumunting Lihim with Iza Calzado, Janice de Belen, and Agot Isidro. She summarized her experience doing the film as "very liberating": "Making an indie film gives you some sort of freedom ... you can just let it all out ... all of a sudden you have the permission to do anything you want." The film premiered at the 8th Cinemalaya Independent Film Festival and she was jointly awarded Best Actress and Best Supporting Actress with Calzado, de Belen, and Isidro. Santos then returned as a presenter on the first season of MasterChef Pinoy Edition, which premiered in November 2012. The following month, she co-starred with Vic Sotto and Bong Revilla Jr. in Si Agimat, si Enteng Kabisote at si Ako. Santos began 2013 with the drama series Huwag Ka Lang Mawawala playing an abused wife seeking revenge. Nestor Torre Jr. from the Philippine Daily Inquirer dismissed her performance as "too melodramatically achieved, and at times [Santos's] assumption of vengeful power ... was too easily pulled off", concluding that the "key thematic intention of female empowerment wasn't sufficiently earned on a realistic level". In October 2013, Santos hosted Bet on Your Baby, based on the original American show of the same name.

=== 2014–present: Independent films and comedies ===
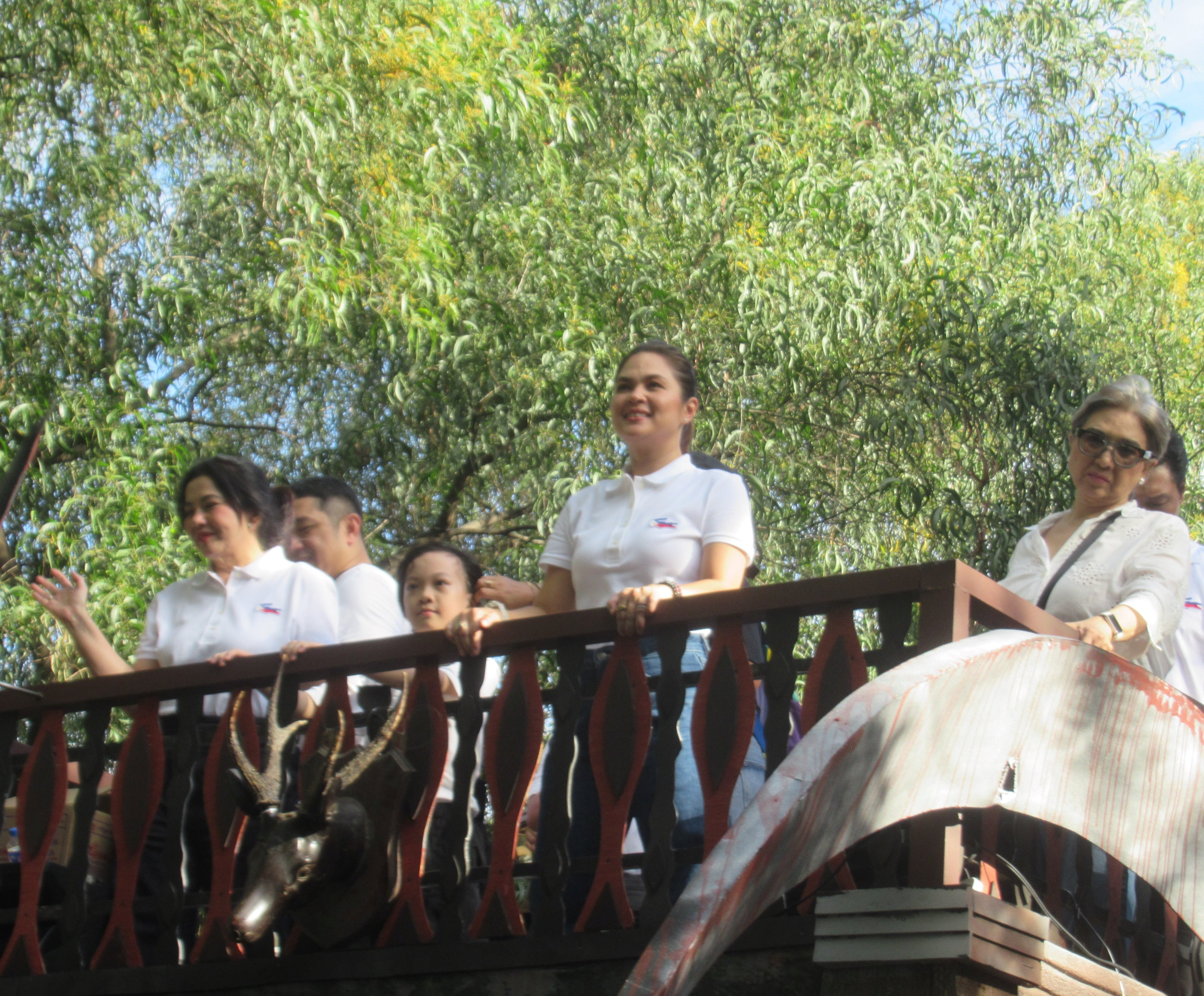
Santos (center, standing) during the 2024 Metro Manila Film Festival "Parade of Stars" to promote Espantaho

In 2014, Santos was cast in the supernatural horror T'yanak, an abridged retelling of Lore Reyes and Peque Gallaga's 1988 film of the same name, in which she played an adoptive mother to a demonic infant. An admirer of the directors' work, she considered the film "a dream come true". Production of the film was completed in eight days and it premiered at the Sineng Pambansa Horror Plus Film Festival. Gallaga said, "Every time she went before the camera, she surprised me. I am amazed by her ability to easily cry." That year, she returned to television as a presenter in I Do.

Santos did not make any screen appearances in 2015, but returned in Kusina, an independent film directed by David Corpuz and Cenon Palomares in 2016. It was adapted from Palomares's Palanca Award-winning script, and premiered at the 12th Cinemalaya Independent Film Festival. The film and Santos's performance garnered critical acclaim; Ricky Calderon from The Philippine Star wrote, "Santos delivers a knockout performance ... we can't think of any other actress to play the role", and praised the film for its "use of daring dramatic license and minimalist theatrical devices". Film critic Mari-An Santos lauded the "gentle storytelling approach associated with theater", and asserted that "this is not soap opera television acting, it is convincing method acting". Two years later, Santos starred in Ang Dalawang Mrs. Reyes (2018), which grossed ₱120 million (US$2.2 million) at the box office.

The novelty of playing a villainous part drew Santos to play Teresa Dichaves in Starla (2019). Despite her character's actions, Santos played the part to make Teresa seem "sympathetic" and "selfless". The series aired from October 7, 2019, to January 10, 2020. Santos's second role in 2019 was in Brillante Mendoza's war drama Mindanao. The film premiered at the 24th Busan International Film Festival. Although the response to the film was mixed, critics were highly appreciative of Santos's performance; the Screen International wrote, "This is not a film which leaves any emotional button unpushed ... [but] throughout all this, Santos retains grace and dignity with a performance which is a class apart from the rest of the picture." SunStar Davao felt that the film lacked "depth and cultural nuance" and criticized Mendoza's misrepresentation and unfamiliarity of the region's ethnic groups. In contrast, Jessica Kiang from Variety highlighted Santos's "de-glammed, gently anguished, remarkably sympathetic performance", and called the film "well acted but clumsy". Mindanao was submitted for consideration at the 91st Academy Awards for Best International Feature Film. The role won Santos the Best Actress award from the Cairo International Film Festival, Metro Manila Film Festival, and Luna Awards. In 2020, Santos hosted Paano Kita Mapasasalamatan.

Santos will collaborate with Erik Matti on two projects. These will be a biopic of Regal Entertainment founder Lily Monteverde, and a remake of the French comedy series Call My Agent!, which co-stars Edu Manzano, Gina Alajar, and RK Bagatsing. She will feature alongside Sam Milby in Rayhan Carlos's horror film The Diary of Mrs. Winters, about a trauma cleaner who is troubled by unexplained events after finding a suicide victim's diary. Santos is also attached to star as a fictional Philippine President who is the target of an assassination plot in the upcoming eight-part crime thriller miniseries The Bagman.

== Reception and acting style ==
Santos's star on the Philippine Walk of Fame

Santos has been regarded as one of the most talented and accomplished Filipino actresses of her generation. Having appeared in more than 50 films and numerous television series since her career began as a child actress, a journalist from The Philippine Star believes that Santos "can lay claim to one of the most successful entertainment careers in local tinsel town". She is noted for playing in a range of material, including indie films, and Brillante Mendoza, who directed Santos in Mindanao, praised her versatility. The stardom she achieved in the early 1990s intensified her image as a teen idol, from which she sought to dissociate herself. Santos took risks by starring in unconventional projects like Sabel. Lamangan called her performance one of her "finest and most accomplished", while The Philippine Star wrote of her transition to adult roles, "[Santos] can bid those light-as-froth, boring-to-death roles good riddance".

Early in her career, Santos was particularly known for playing oppressed and impoverished women, and specialized in "martyred characters". She is also noted for her ability to "cry on cue", often asking directors how they want her to specifically cry. Journalist Rose Fausto wrote that she "possesses an advanced skill in crying and acting out emotions effectively in dramatic scenes because she has a wealth of experience to draw from". Gallaga described Santos's vulnerability saying, "It's easy for [her] to cry ... sometimes, even before the camera starts rolling ... so what she does is blank out her mind and wait for the take." Journalist Chez Ganal wrote that "[w]ithout benefit of a scene partner, [she] had to expose a variety of emotions ... she also didn't have help from dramatic monologues and confrontation scenes." He described Santos's ability to subtly "blend into the scene and not stand out" a test of her "range and control". Commenting on her comedic performances, Asilo praised her ability to "get off the beaten track", and called it a "brave and bold decision that evinces growth and maturity". "Making people laugh is a special skill that requires an idiosyncratic combination of innate talent and time-honed experience", he says, "but [Santos's] spot-on characterization and lived-in earnestness manage to see her through". Nestor Torre Jr., also of the Philippine Daily Inquirer, described her foray into comedy as "gutsy".

As a frequent collaborator, Piolo Pascual has said working with Santos was a critical breakthrough for him. Dennis Trillo, her co-star in Aishite Imasu 1941: Mahal Kita and Mag-ingat Ka Sa... Kulam, considers Santos to be "the picture of excellence in the profession", and Iza Calzado, with whom she worked in Ouija and Mga Mumunting Lihim, believes that she is a "naturally gifted" actress and her "eyes alone express emotions". Javier Reyes said that "[s]he is in a league all her own. They don't make actresses like her anymore. Give her a phonebook to read and she will deliver an award-worthy, original performance."

Since her childhood, Santos has considered Julie Vega a role model and inspiration. When asked about the impact of Vega's sudden death in 1985, she said it devastated her. She cited Sharon Cuneta, Vilma Santos and Nora Aunor as her influences, and also admires the generosity of Dolphy and Fernando Poe Jr.

== Other ventures ==
Santos has established a career as a chef, restaurateur and cookbook author. In the early 2000s, she became involved in the restaurant business and purchased Kaffe Kilimanjaro and Kaffe Carabana in Diliman, Quezon City, both of which eventually closed.

Santos's first book, Judy Ann's Kitchen, was published in August 2015 as a collaboration with Anvil Publishing and National Book Store. It was described by Ruel De Vera of the Philippine Daily Inquirer as "recipes ranging from interesting comfort food to more complicated dishes", and added that "[i]t doesn't simply present itself as a book for would-be cooks. The book's inside back cover flap identifies the author as wife, homemaker, actress and mom, and beyond the recipes, the book reflects this by design and content." Santos's passion for cooking comes from her experience as a child actress being around caterers and later from her decision to attend culinary school. "There's something about preparing meals for the people who matter in your life ... You can show your love and care for them by simply sharing the food you prepared ... I see that good food can put smiles on their faces, and I consider it an accomplishment that I am able to make people happy with the food that I cook", she said. In 2016, the book received the Gourmand International's Cookbook Award for Best Authors and Chefs Outside Europe. The following year, Santos launched a namesake cooking show on YouTube.

Santos co-owns AngryDobo, a Filipino restaurant in Malate, Manila, that opened in May 2019. A second location opened in Alabang, Muntinlupa, a year later. The restaurant and signature dish's name is a portmanteau of "angry adobo", which originated from an argument between Santos and her husband Ryan Agoncillo.

== Personal life and public image ==
Santos is married to Ryan Agoncillo. They began dating in 2004 after meeting on the set of Krystala, and became engaged in May 2008. They married in a private ceremony held in San Juan, Batangas, on April 28, 2009, and currently reside in Alabang, Muntinlupa. The couple have three children: Johanna Louise, Juan Luis, and Juana Luisa.

In 2006, Santos received a star on the Philippines Walk of Fame. She was named Yes! magazine's Most Beautiful Star in 2007 and has been included in the annual beauty list in 2008, 2009, and 2018. In October 2008, Yes! ranked her sixth on the magazine's top celebrity endorsers list.

== Acting credits and awards ==
Santos's films that have earned the most at the box office, as of 2022, include:

- Muling Ibalik Ang Tamis Ng Pag-ibig (1998)
- Isusumbong Kita sa Tatay Ko... (1999)
- Kahit Isang Saglit (2000)
- Bakit 'Di Totohanin (2001)
- Till There Was You (2003)
- Don't Give Up on Us (2006)
- Kasal, Kasali, Kasalo (2006)
- Sakal, Sakali, Saklolo (2007)
- Si Agimat, si Enteng Kabisote at si Ako (2012)
- Ang Dalawang Mrs. Reyes (2018)

Santos has been named Best Actress at the Cairo International Film Festival for Mindanao (2019). For her role in Kasal, Kasali, Kasalo (2006), she was awarded the FAMAS, Golden Screen, Luna, Metro Manila Film Festival, and Star Award for Best Actress. She has received a Gawad Urian and another Golden Screen award for her performance in Sabel (2004). In addition, for her leading roles on television, she has garnered a Star Award for Krystala (2004) and a KBP Golden Dove Award for Habang May Buhay (2010).

== Discography ==
- Judy Ann Santos (1999)
- Bida Ng Buhay Ko (2001)
- Musika Ng Buhay Ko (2007)

== Bibliography ==
- Santos, Judy Ann (2017). Judy Ann's Kitchen. Anvil Publishing. ISBN 978-9-7127-3184-6.
