= Oh, My Girl! (film) =

- Directed by: Dante Nico Garcia
- Screenplay by: Tanya Winona Bautista
- Story by: Emman dela Cruz; Ogie Alcasid; Tanya Bautista; Josel Garlitos; Regine Velasquez; Dante Nico Garcia
- Produced by: Roselle Monteverde-Teo
- Starring: Judy Ann Santos; Ogie Alcasid
- Cinematography: Odyssey Flores
- Edited by: Danny Añonuevo
- Music by: Von De Guzman
- Production companies: Regal Films; Regal Multimedia, Inc.
- Release date: July 29, 2009
- Country: Philippines
- Language: Filipino

Oh, My Girl! is a 2009 Filipino romantic comedy film produced by Regal Entertainment and directed by Dante Nico Garcia. The film is about friendship and love in the entertainment industry.

Judy Ann Santos stars as the famous actress named Darling, who was known in her childhood days as Opao. Ogie Alcasid plays Biboy, Darling's long-lost childhood friend, who disguises himself as Darling's aunt in order to meet her again.

== Plot ==
Little Opao and Biboy grew up together in an orphanage in Taal, Batangas and promised themselves to be best friends forever. They are separated as they grow older, both being adopted to separate parents. Opao is adopted by a spinster, whose failed career in acting prompts her to mold Opao into a superstar with the nickname Darling. Meanwhile, Biboy is adopted by Crisp Pops.

Biboy opens a handphone repair shop and hopes to meet Opao one day. One day Biboy sees Darling singing on television and realizes she has completely changed from the Opao he used to know. Biboy disguising himself as a girl to be Darling's personal assistant with a new name of Frida. Darling and 'Frida' become best friends without Darling realizing Frida's true identity. Darling then finds companionship with her new love, Bambam. Biboy, as Frida, helps Darling to remember about her earliest memory.

== Cast ==
- Judy Ann Santos as Darling/Opao
  - Dorothy Ann Perez as young Darling
- Ogie Alcasid as Biboy/Frida
  - Jairus Aquino as young Biboy
- Roderick Paulate as Crisp Pops
- Carmi Martin as Inday Langging
- Manilyn Reynes as Tala
- Nova Villa as Sita
- John Prats as Bob
- Jon Avila as Bambam
- Frenchy Dy as Tunganga
- John Lapus as himself
- Jeffrey Santos as a gay friend
- Rez Cortez as gay friend
- Sharon Cuneta as Guada (cameo)
- Regine Velasquez as production assistant (cameo)
- German Moreno as himself (cameo)
- Rufa Mae Quinto as Mayette (cameo)
- Michael V. as himself (cameo)
- Wendell Ramos (cameo)
- Mark Herras (cameo)
- Maureen Larrazabal as Joyce (cameo)
- Boy 2 Quizon (cameo)
- Antonio Aquitania (cameo)
- Francine Prieto (cameo)
- Rainier Castillo as Inday Langging and Crisp Pops's boyfriend
- Diego Llorico as Marddie (cameo)
- Noel Vincent P. Miguel as camera dept.
- Jason Abalos as pedicab driver (cameo)
- Chokoleit† as Toll Gay
- Ketchup Eusebio as assistant director
