= Anna Luna (TV series) =

1989–95 Philippine television drama series

- Genre: Drama; Soap opera
- Created by: Zenaida O. Soriano
- Written by: Salvador M. Royales
- Starring: Margarita Fuentes; Ricky Belmonte; Melissa Mendez
- Country of origin: Philippines
- Original language: Filipino
- No. of episodes: 1,513

Production
- Running time: 25–30 minutes

Original release
- Network: ABS-CBN (1989–94); RPN (1994–95)
- Release: November 27, 1989 – September 29, 1995

Related
- Anna Liza

Anna Luna is a Philippine television drama broadcast by ABS-CBN and RPN. Starring Margarita Fuentes, Ricky Belmonte and Melissa Mendez, it aired from November 27, 1989 to September 29, 1995. Anna Luna made a comeback during the glory days of Philippine drama and became a contemporary for some other series like Mara Clara, Agila and Valiente.

== Plot ==
Separated from her mother after an accident at sea, Anna Luna is forced to live in the city with her estranged grandmother, Doña Martina Dominguez.

Anna Luna is unwanted in the Dominguez mansion. She is a constant reminder of her daughter's disobedience by marrying a poor man to her grandmother. To her aunt and cousin, she is a threat to the inheritance.

== Cast and characters ==
=== Main cast ===
- Margarita Fuentes as Anna Luna D. Tecson / Anna Luna D. Corpuz
- Ricky Belmonte as Arnulfo Corpuz
- Melissa Mendez as Emily Dominguez-Tecson / Pilar

=== Supporting cast ===
- Suzanne Gonzales as Elvira Dominguez
- Charmi Benavidez as Claire Corpuz
- Joanne Miller as Eunice Corpuz
- Wilma Dela Rosa as Aleli Corpuz
- Em-em Mabanglo as Macy
- Lorraine Schuck as Sister Lourdes Dominguez
- Dennis Baltazar as Erwin Dominguez
- Hugo Linsangan as Joey
- Victor Neri as Edmond
- Gloria "Mona Lisa" Yatco as Doña Martina Dominguez
- Metring David as Cita
- Vangie Labalan as Tarsing
- Ronnie Lazaro as Pinong
- Errol Dionisio
- Sylvia Sanchez
- Tita de Villa
- Jessa Zaragoza
- Beverly Vergel
- Perla Bautista

== Production ==
Judy Ann Santos was the first offered to play the titular role but she was chosen to portray the main role of soap opera Ula, Ang Batang Gubat. The production later conducted an audition and chose Margarita Fuentes to portray Anna Luna.

== Timeslot ==
Anna Luna aired on ABS-CBN from November 27, 1989 to September 30, 1994, every weekday from 2:00 PM to 2:30 PM. It then aired on RPN from October 3, 1994 to September 29, 1995.

== Controversy ==
In 1994, Jose Mari Gonzales, the president of RPN at that time, was accused by ABS-CBN of copyright infringement on this soap opera. He believed that Anna Luna was the intellectual property of Zenaida O. Soriano, the wife of Anna Liza director Gil Soriano. Gonzales also believed that ABS-CBN only acquired Soriano to line-produce the series and that the network attempted to buy its airing rights but the production company behind Anna Luna refused which led to its removal. However, RPN continued to air Anna Luna, with a new title Hanggang Kailan, Anna Luna?: Ikalawang Aklat (English title: Anna Luna, Until when?: Second Book) to become part of the network's relaunch on October 3, 1994. The series ended on September 29, 1995 after a year of broadcast on RPN and almost 6 years on the air.

== Award ==
- PMPC Star Awards for TV's Best New TV Personality (1990) – Margarita Fuentes

== See also ==
- List of programs broadcast by ABS-CBN
- List of programs previously broadcast by Radio Philippines Network
