= Till There Was You (2003 film) =

- Title poster
- Directed by: Bb. Joyce Bernal
- Screenplay by: Dindo Perez; Mel Del Rosario
- Story by: Ned Trespeces
- Produced by: Charo Santos-Concio; Malou N. Santos
- Starring: Judy Ann Santos; Piolo Pascual
- Cinematography: Charlie Peralta
- Edited by: Marya Ignacio
- Music by: Raul Mitra
- Production company: Star Cinema
- Release date: April 30, 2003 (Philippines)
- Running time: 109 minutes
- Country: Philippines
- Language: Filipino
- Box office: ₱107.45 million

Till There Was You is a 2003 Filipino romantic comedy-drama film, directed by Joyce E. Bernal, from a story written by Ned Trespeces and adapted into a screenplay by Dindo Perez and Mel Mendoza-Del Rosario. The film stars Judy Ann Santos and Piolo Pascual, who both starred from the top-rating primetime soap opera, Sa Puso Ko, Iingatan Ka, which ended two months earlier.

Produced and distributed by Star Cinema, the film was theatrically released on April 30, 2003.

== Plot ==
Joanna (Santos) meets single father Albert (Pascual) and his baby Pippa on a bus. When she gets off the bus, Joanna accidentally leaves her photograph behind with her book. Over the years, Pippa comes to believe that this picture is of her mother's. Years later, Pippa meets Joanna again, and Albert hires her to act as Pippa's mother. Eventually, Albert and Joanna become romantically involved.

== Cast ==
- Judy Ann Santos as Joanna Boborol
- Piolo Pascual as Albert Robles
- Marissa Delgado as Zita Robles
- Eliza Pineda as Pippa Robles
- Ronaldo Valdez as Alfonso Robles
- Angel Jacob as Rachel Garcia
- Jennifer Sevilla as Celia Hernandez
- Janus Del Prado as Damon Boborol
- Bearwin Meily as Bogart Boborol
- Matet De Leon as Jean
- Gina Pareño as Lagring Boborol
- Pen Medina as Frank Boborol
- Alfred Labatos as Egay Boborol
- Carl John Barrameda as JR Boborol
