= Don't Give Up on Us (film) =

- Don't Give Up on Us Official Poster
- Directed by: Bb. Joyce Bernal
- Screenplay by: Dindo C. Perez; Carol L. San Pedro; Artemio C. Abad, Jr.
- Story by: Enrico C. Santos
- Produced by: Elma S. Medua
- Starring: Judy Ann Santos; Piolo Pascual
- Cinematography: Charlie Peralta
- Edited by: Marya Ignacio
- Music by: Raul Mitra
- Distributed by: Star Cinema
- Release date: January 8, 2006
- Running time: 113 minutes
- Country: Philippines
- Language: Filipino
- Box office: ₱135 million (4 weeks)

Don't Give Up on Us is a 2006 Filipino romantic comedy film directed by Joyce E. Bernal. The film was the fifth and last screen appearance of Judy Ann Santos and Piolo Pascual together (after Esperanza: The Movie, Kahit Isang Saglit, Bakit 'Di Totohanin and Till There Was You) prior to the premiering of Sa Piling Mo next month as well as the non-official entry for the 31st Metro Manila Film Festival almost 3 weeks later.

Don't Give Up on Us grossed roughly ₱129 million in the Philippines. The official websites listed several international screenings but no international box-office receipts were made available by Star Cinema. It is the third Highest-Grossing Philippine-produced movie in 2006 after Sukob and Kasal, Kasali, Kasalo.

The Cinema Evaluation Board (CEB) gave Don't Give Up on Us a B rating, which made it eligible for a 65% tax rebate on its earnings in the Philippines.

The Movie and Television Review and Classification Board (MTRCB) gave Don't Give Up on Us a PG-13 rating which required parental guidance for viewers under thirteen years of age.

== Plot ==
In a most unexpected place, love finds its way... But will it survive the journey?

Abby (Judy Ann Santos) thinks she has everything under control until her best friend Sabina walks out of her own bridal shower weeks before her marriage to Abby's younger brother Samuel. With a cassette tape left behind by Sabina as her only lead, Abby vows to find her best friend and bring her back in time for the wedding.

Abby's search takes her to Baguio. There she meets Vince (Piolo Pascual) and his younger brother Marco, a folk singer in a local pub whose voice she heard in Sabina's tape. Vince claims that he recorded the song for his friend Rabbit who was supposed to give it to his girlfriend (Sabina). Abby persuades Vince to take her to Rabbit in the hope to find Sabina. Marco thinks of an idea to get Vince and Abby together.

As Abby and Vince travel together through the mountain provinces, love tries to find its way through their hearts. But will it survive the journey?

== Cast ==
- Judy Ann Santos as Abelarda "Abby" Trinidad
- Piolo Pascual as Vince
- Hilda Koronel as Pilar
- Rio Locsin as Teresa
- Tommy Abuel as Robert
- Marjorie Barretto as Aleli
- Cheska Garcia as Sabina
- John Wayne Sace as Julius
- Marco Alcaraz as Samuel
- Paolo Paraiso as Rabbit
- JC Quadrado as Marco

== Accolades ==
- YES! Magazine Reader's Choice 2006
  Favorite Actress of the Year - Sol Bagoporo
  Favorite Movie of the Year
- S Magazine Reader's Choice Awards 2006
  Hottest Premium Actress - Judy Ann Santos
  Hottest Premium Actor - Piolo Pascual
  Movie of the Year
- 4th ENPRESS Golden Screen Awards (March 17, 2007)
  Best Performance by an Actor in a Leading Role (Musical/Comedy) - Piolo Pascual
- 23rd PMPC Star Awards for Movies (March 23, 2007)
  Movie Actor of the Year - Piolo Pascual
  Movie Cinematographer of the Year - Charlie Peralta
  Movie Original Theme Song of the Year - "Sana Ay Malaman Mo" (Piolo Pascual)
