= Mga Mumunting Lihim =

- Official poster
- Directed by: Jose Javier Reyes
- Written by: Jose Javier Reyes
- Produced by: Charyl Chan-de Guzman, Mr Joey Abacan
- Starring: Judy Ann Santos; Iza Calzado; Agot Isidro; Janice de Belen
- Cinematography: Rodolfo Y. Aves Jr.
- Edited by: Vanessa de Leon
- Music by: Jesse Lucas
- Production companies: Cinemalaya; LargaVista Entertainment; OctoArts Films
- Distributed by: OctoArts Films; GMA Films
- Release dates: July 21, 2012 (Philippine Independent Film Festival); August 22, 2012 (Philippines)
- Running time: 100 minutes
- Country: Philippines
- Language: Filipino

Mga Mumunting Lihim (English: Those Little Secrets) is a 2012 Filipino drama film written and directed by Jose Javier Reyes. The film tells the story of four female friends and the secrets behind their friendship. It is one of the official entries for the Director's Showcase category in the Cinemalaya 2012.

== Synopsis ==
Mariel, a housewife who died from cancer, left a box full of her diaries through the years to her best friend, Carly, an advertising executive. Though Sandra and Olive warned her not to read the diaries, she could not resist knowing what was written on those. Soon, all the hidden stories ruined their friendship.

The story follows four long-time friends, Marissa, Tere, Rachel, and Carla, who have been inseparable since their college days.

As they navigate through the challenges of adulthood, the friends find themselves facing unresolved issues and buried secrets from their past. The plot takes a dramatic turn when a mysterious letter arrives, reopening wounds they thought were healed. The letter contains a series of confessions and revelations that threaten to shatter the foundation of their friendship.

As the friends grapple with the truth, the film delves into their individual lives, exploring the choices they made and the consequences that followed. Each character is confronted with personal struggles, hidden desires, and the consequences of decisions made in their youth.

The narrative weaves through flashbacks that gradually unveil the events that led to the secrets being kept. Emotions run high as the characters confront their past mistakes, betrayal, and the sacrifices made in the name of friendship. Themes of forgiveness, acceptance, and the resilience of true friendship are explored as the characters try to come to terms with the revelations and find a way to rebuild their bond.

== Cast ==
- Judy Ann Santos as Mariel
- Iza Calzado as Carly
- Agot Isidro as Sandra
- Janice de Belen as Olive

== Awards ==
2012

8th Cinemalaya Independent Film Festival

- Best Editing
- Best Screenplay
- Best Actress and Supporting Actress (the ensemble)
- Nominated-Best Film

== Reviews ==
GMA News Online expressed dissatisfaction with Jose Javier Reyes' previous commercial filmmaking endeavors, criticizing the focus on lead roles for box-office success. However, the reviewer is pleasantly surprised by "Mga Mumunting Lihim," praising its portrayal of real and relatable conversations among four adult women dealing with friendship, secrets, and the unraveling of their bond after one of them, Mariel, dies of cancer. Despite some shortcomings in character development, the film is commended for offering a refreshing and honest depiction of women's relationships, diverging from conventional romantic narratives and presenting a more authentic reflection of Filipino women's lives.

PEP gave it a positive review. In summary it said that the film's admirable tight storytelling, effective use of flashbacks, and realistic dialogue contribute to its entertainment value, showcasing the ensemble cast's chemistry and delivering humorous and must-see moments, such as the characters using curse words and engaging in lively arguments.
