= MasterChef Pinoy Edition =

2012–13 Philippine television reality cooking show

- Also known as: MasterChef Philippines, MasterChef PH
- Genre: Competitive cooking show
- Based on: MasterChef
- Presented by: Judy Ann Santos-Agoncillo
- Judges: Ferns Aracama; Rolando Laudico; JP Anglo
- Narrated by: Winnie Cordero
- Country of origin: Philippines
- Original language: Filipino
- No. of seasons: 1
- No. of episodes: 86

Production
- Running time: 45 minutes
- Production companies: Shine International; ABS-CBN Studios One Potato Two Potato

Original release
- Network: ABS-CBN; GMA Network
- Release: November 12, 2012 – February 9, 2013

Related
- Junior MasterChef Pinoy Edition (2011); MasterChef

MasterChef Pinoy Edition is a Philippine competitive cooking game show broadcast by ABS-CBN. The show is based from the British television series, MasterChef. Hosted by Judy Ann Santos-Agoncillo. Santos-Agoncillo was also joined by chefs Fernando Aracama, Rolando Laudico and JP Anglo as the judges of the show, it aired on the network's Umaganda morning line up from November 12, 2012 to February 9, 2013, and was replaced by Ohlala Couple.

== Overview ==
The series was part of the MasterChef franchise and was based on a similar competition format held in the United Kingdom, where MasterChef originated.

=== Format ===
Of all the amateur chefs who auditioned nationwide, the chosen auditionees, usually three to four auditionees per episode, had to cook their signature dish under a 60-minute time limit for the four judges. Each judge took a taste of the dishes and gave their opinions before they all chose the auditionee who was to move on to the next round. After the initial round, all the auditionees underwent more further cooking tests until the four judges had chosen the top finalists.

Each week, the finalists underwent numerous challenges and tests. The finalists also underwent elimination tests reducing their numbers until the only remaining hopeful cook remained.

=== Broadcasting ===
Unlike its international counterparts, the show was broadcast as a weekday morning program airing 45 minutes per episode 5 times a week, Monday through Friday, while the Saturday edition included encore episodes with never before seen footage during the taping where they discovered and whipped up extraordinary dishes as well as giving out cooking tips and trivia.

== Prizes ==
The winner of the competition received the four million peso cash prize, a culinary scholarship from the Center of Asian Culinary Studies, and a kitchen showcase from Fujidenzo.

== Season summary ==
Season	Premiere	Finale	Winner	Runner-up	Third place	Fourth place	No. of Finalists	Host	Judges
1	November 12, 2012	February 9, 2013	JR Royol	Carla Marcaida	Ivory Yat	Myra Santos	16	Judy Ann Santos-Agoncillo	Judy Ann Santos-Agoncillo; Fernando Aracama; Rolando Laudico; JP Anglo

=== Season 1 (2012–2013) ===
==== Contestants ====
Name		Age	Occupation	Hometown	Episode of elimination
1	JR Royol	29	Band vocalist	Benguet	Final
2	Carla Marcaida	40	Businesswoman	Bulacan	Final
3	Ivory Yat	26	Nurse	Quezon City	Final
4	Myra Santos	31	Accounting associate	Muntinlupa	Final
5	Ronnel Torres	30	Sari-sari store owner	Pampanga	Semi-final
6	Sonny Boy Tuazon	24	Unemployed	Bataan	Episode 11 / Episode 2
7	Reggie Apolinario	30	Call center agent	Laguna	Episode 10
8	Mac Serrano	30	Former seaman	Tarlac	Episode 9
9	Maureen Angala	33	Housewife	Muntinlupa	Episode 8
10	Gian Espadera	20	Human Resource Management student	Davao City	Episode 7
11	Cons Osorio	30	Interior designer	San Juan	Episode 6
12	Betty Bais	43	House helper	Cebu City	Episode 5
13	Lilibeth Nicolas	31	House helper	Quezon City	Episode 4
14	Tolits Dulva	34	Police	Sorsogon	Episode 3
15	Melissa Gutierrez	51	Marketing director	Quezon City	Episode 3
16	Malou Caiña	41	Branch supervisor	Cagayan de Oro	Episode 2

== See also ==
- List of programs broadcast by ABS-CBN
- MasterChef
- Junior MasterChef
