= Bet on Your Baby =

2013 American game show

- Genre: Game show
- Created by: Craig Armstrong; Rick Ringbakk; Charles Wachter; Ben Silverman; Jimmy Fox
- Directed by: Rich DiPirro
- Presented by: Melissa Peterman
- Country of origin: United States
- Original language: English
- No. of seasons: 2
- No. of episodes: 16

Production
- Executive producers: Ben Silverman; Chris Grant; Jimmy Fox; Craig Armstrong; Rick Ringbakk
- Camera setup: Multiple
- Running time: 43 minutes
- Production companies: Electus; 5x5 Media; Procter & Gamble Entertainment

Original release
- Network: ABC
- Release: April 13, 2013 – July 19, 2014

Bet on Your Baby is an American game show that is hosted by Melissa Peterman. The series premiered on ABC on April 13, 2013, with two back-to-back episodes. Each episode features five families with toddlers between the ages of two and three-and-a-half years old, who play to see how well they can guess their child's next move in order to win money toward their college fund.

On January 28, 2014, Bet on Your Baby was renewed for an eight episode second season. Season 2 premiered on May 31, 2014. The show did not make ABC's Summer 2015 schedule.

== Format ==
Four families of three (two parents and a toddler) participated per episode.

=== First round ===
Each family participates in this round separately. For each family, the toddler and one of the parents is sent to a separate room called the "baby dome" to perform a challenge. Before the challenge starts, the remaining parent remaining on stage is asked multiple-choice question about the kid's performance to the challenge and the parent must guess the answer. The challenge starts after he or she locks in their answer by hitting a button on their table. If the kid's performance in the challenge matches with the parent's answer, the family wins $5,000 towards the kid's college fund.

=== Second round ===
All parents participate in this round together. The parents are shown a clip of a conversation between the host and all toddlers about a secret keyword. Throughout the conversation, the host and toddlers will discuss about this word, giving hints or notable features about it. Once a family figures out the answer, they must buzz in. Giving the correct answer sends the family to the college round, while an incorrect answer locks them out, but they will be allowed to buzz in again when another family is locked out.

=== College round ===
The winning family is shown 10 piggy banks, each holding a different value towards the kid's college fund ranging from $500 to $50,000 (with the $50,000 grand prize being shown as the word "College"). The family is allowed to smash up to four piggy banks; after each smash that is not the $50,000 "College" prize, the family has to decide whether to quit with the amount in that piggy bank only, or give up this amount and smash another piggy bank.

== International versions ==
Country	Name	Host	Channel	Premiere	Finale	Prize	Ref.
Argentina	Si los chicos quieren!	Julian Weich	Canal 13	November 1, 2013		$50,000	
China	正大综艺.宝宝来了	Zhu Xun & Qiang Zi	CCTV-1	November 10, 2013		1-year admission to an international kindergarten	
Colombia	¡Apuesta a su Chico!	Lady Mina	Caracol TV	June 2015		$200,000	
Mexico	Le apuesto a mi Bebé	Cecilia Gabriela	Canal de las Estrellas	2014		MX$5,000,000	
Philippines	Bet on Your Baby	Judy Ann Santos	ABS-CBN	October 19, 2013	September 9, 2017	₱1,000,000	
South Korea	COME ON BABY	Noh Hong-chul, Park Ji-yoon	tvN	July 14, 2014		₩5,000,000	
Turkey	Çocuk Oyuncağı	Ezgi Mola	Star TV	July 10, 2013		₺50.000	
Ukraine	Мій малюк зможе Miy Malyuk Zmozhe	Irma Vitovska	1+1	June 15, 2014		₴50.000	
USA (Spanish)	Si Los Bebes Quieren	Maria Eugenia Payan	Univision	November 1, 2019		$50,000	
Uruguay	Bet On Your Baby Uruguay!	Lady Mina Cecilia Gabriella Judy Ann Santos	Telefe	March 7, 2013	December 25, 2015	$1,000,000	
Vietnam	Cố lên con yêu!	Ốc Thanh Vân, Trần Tiểu Hào	VTV3	April 17, 2016	April 14, 2018	đ 30.000.000	
