= Mag-ingat Ka Sa... Kulam =

Mag-ingat Ka sa... Kulam
- Official movie poster
- Directed by: Jun Lana
- Screenplay by: Jun Lana; Elmer L. Gatchalian; Renato Custodio Jr.
- Story by: Jun Lana
- Produced by: Lily Monteverde; Roselle Monteverde-Teo
- Starring: Judy Ann Santos; Dennis Trillo
- Cinematography: Mo Zee
- Edited by: Renewin Alano; Ria De Guzman; Mikael Angelo Pestaño
- Production companies: Regal Films; Regal Multimedia Inc.
- Release date: October 1, 2008
- Country: Philippines
- Languages: Filipino; English
- Box office: ₱87,490,918.00

Mag-ingat Ka sa... Kulam (lit. 'Beware of... Witchcraft') or Kulam is a Filipino fantasy- horror film co-written and directed by Jun Lana and starring Judy Ann Santos and Dennis Trillo. It is produced and released by Regal Films as part of their year-long 48th anniversary celebration. The film was released domestically on October 1, 2008. The film is about a married woman who starts behaving unpredictably as she recovers from a terrible car accident.

Mag-ingat Ka sa... Kulam is the first film among others to be officially released without charge on YouTube by Regal Entertainment, on May 2, 2020.

== Plot ==
After Mira wakes up from a car accident, she starts seeing things that she could not explain. She feels paranormal activity is occurring inside their house. As she cannot remember anything that happened before the accident, Dave comes to her house and explains to her that she was supposed to leave her husband, Paul, and elope with him. Dave tells her that she loved him and she entrusted a secret to him. Mira learns that Paul had another lover before which caused their relationship to deteriorate. Even her blind child, Sophie seems aloof and is scared of her. She starts to patch things up between her and her family but cannot forget what Dave told her about her secret.

Mira calls up Dave to meet him and Dave explains to her the secret. Dave tells her how she had a twin sister named Maria that she left in an asylum after she goes insane after their mother's death. Mira and Dave go to the asylum to see Maria, only to be told she committed suicide a month back and her unclaimed corpse taken to a university for study. She tells Paul about this which surprises him. Paul calls the university to claim the corpse and have it cremated.

Sophie's vision is restored after she undergoes an eye transplant, but upon opening her eyes, she sees a woman standing behind her mother, which only she can see.

Eventually Paul and Mira have enough of the paranormal activity so they decide to seek help from a medium, who tells them that a powerful spell is to acquire a physical body on an eclipse when spirits are at their most powerful. The medium findsa doll which he calls "antiguar", a powerful device that a bad spirit can use to let itself remain in this world. On the night of the eclipse, Sophie and Paul watch the phenomenon when Paul catches a glimpse of something white approaching them, which turns out to be Maria's body. He takes Sophie inside in her room, where he finds a tape which he sees was recorded by Mira for him. The video shows Mira videotaping herself before her accident, saying in the tape how Paul could fight Maria. In the room where Mira was, her body becomes that of Maria. It is revealed that it was Maria who came back from the car accident and it was Mira who died in the asylum and got cremated. Mira had been dead all along and it was Maria who used her body to come back to the world and take vengeance against Mira through her family.

Mira recalls that their mother was a mangkukulam (witch) and tried to transfer her powers to the twins when they were young. Being the braver one, Mira tried to contradict their mother's chants as she did not want to learn about her evil doings and voodoo magic. When the twins grew up, Mira decided to run away from home, leaving Maria behind. Their mother died soon after. Mira attended the burial and thought that Maria had gone insane, claiming she could talk to things that Mira could not see. Mira then told her twin that she would bring her with her to Manila. It turned out though that Mira would send her to the asylum, leaving Maris heartbroken. One night, she stayed up late and did the aforementioned spell so that her and Mira's souls could switch. The chant was effective, but when Maria's soul transferred to Mira's body (who was on the way to the asylum to stop Maria from doing any harm to her family) the car got into a horrible accident. Maria, who woke up in Mira's body could no longer remember anything while Mira who found herself in Maria's body woke up from the trance already in the asylum.

In the present, Paul replays the videotape that Mira left for him. Mira said that by the time Paul got to watch the video, she would have been dead. Paul needs to trap Maria in a circle made of Mira's body's ashes. Paul does this but Maria discovers the trick. She is then pushed by Sophie into the circle of ash. Paul stabbs the "antiguar" with a piece of wood and Maria's soul burns and disappears. Mira's soul shows up to Paul and Sophie to bid them farewell. It is hinted at the end that Sophie saw the book under Maria's influence. Implying that Maria will guide her to use for witchcraft.

== Cast ==
Main cast

- Judy Ann Santos as Mira/Maria
- Dennis Trillo as Paul

Supporting cast

- TJ Trinidad as Dave
- Sharlene San Pedro as Sophie
- Kris Bernal as Maggie
- Mart Escudero as Neil
- Ces Quesada as Desing
- Cris Daluz as Albularyo (medium)

== Reception ==
=== Critical response ===
The film received an "A" rating from the Cinema Evaluation Board.

=== Box Office ===
The film was a box office success. The film grossed P43.3 million on its opening weekend, and grossed P87.4 million for its entire theatrical run.

== Accolades ==
- 6th Golden Screen Awards
  Best Visual Effects: Roadrunner Network, Inc.
- 25th PMPC Star Awards for Movies
  Movie of the Year
  Movie Director of the Year: Jun Lana
  Movie Actress of the Year: Judy Ann Santos
  Movie Child Performer of the Year: Sharlene San Pedro
  Original Movie Screenplay of the Year: Jun Lana, Elmer Gatchalian and Renato Custodio
  Movie Cinematographer of the Year: Moises Zee
  Movie Editor of the Year: Ria De Guzman, Renewin Alano & Mikael Angelo Pestano
  Movie Production Designer of the Year: Mario Lipit & Edgar Martin Littaua
  Movie Sound Engineer of the Year: Bebet Casas
- 11th Gawad Pasado Awards
  Pinakapasadong Editing (Best Editing): Ria de Guzman, Renewin Alano at Angelo Pestano
  Pinakapasadong Tunog (Best Sound): Bebet Casas
- 27th FAP Luna Awards
  Best Musical Scoring: Von de Guzman

== See also ==
- List of ghost films
