= Sa Puso Ko, Iingatan Ka =

- Title card
- Also known as: Keeping You In My Heart
- Genre: Romance; Drama
- Written by: Gina Marissa Tagasa-Gil
- Directed by: Jose Javier Reyes (2001); Gilbert Perez (2001-2003); Cathy Garcia-Sampana (2001-2003)
- Starring: Judy Ann Santos; Piolo Pascual
- Opening theme: "Iingatan Ka" by Carol Banawa
- Composer: Marizen Yaneza
- Country of origin: Philippines
- Original language: Filipino
- No. of episodes: 433

Production
- Executive producer: Julie Anne R. Benitez
- Running time: 30 minutes
- Production company: Star Creatives

Original release
- Network: ABS-CBN
- Release: June 18, 2001 – February 14, 2003

Sa Puso Ko, Iingatan Ka (transl. in my heart, i'll take care of you, international title: Keeping You In My Heart) is a Philippine television drama series broadcast by ABS-CBN. Starring Judy Ann Santos and Piolo Pascual, it aired on the network's Primetime Combo-Nalo line up from June 18, 2001 to February 14, 2003.

== Premise ==
A young woman named Patricia is trying to find true acceptance and love from her father (Edu Manzano). After being born out of wedlock she must also succumb to get through her daily emotional ordeals such as her complicated family life with her mother and drunken lover her cruel stepsister and her grandmother. She will fall in love in the process with Jordan a young man who will fall for her heart. But will their love story get a happily ever after?

The story revolves around Patricia (Judy Ann Santos) and her search for a comfortable life. Patricia, born out of wedlock to parents Armand Montecillo (Edu Manzano) and his secretary-turned-lover Nieves Quevado (Zsa Zsa Padilla), had to face various challenges and tribulations, including living with an alcoholic abusive stepfather Abner (Pen Medina) and experiencing cruelty from her step sister Sheila (Julia Clarete). However, hope arrives as she meets Jordan (Piolo Pascual) who promises eternal love. Patricia and Jordan marry and face the wounds of their pasts.

Can greed and power destroy others or can love and determination heal all types of wounds?

In the end, Patricia is revealed to be the long-lost biological daughter of Armand with Mayla (Coney Reyes), who was initially her stepmother. Nieves is actually Patricia's adoptive mother who had a son with Armand, named Chandro (Romnick Sarmenta) was stole by Dr. Enriquez (Timmy Cruz) she's adoptive mother. Meanwhile, Sheila, believed to be Armand and Mayla's daughter, is actually the long-lost biological daughter of Star (Cherie Gil).

== Cast ==
Lead cast

- Judy Ann Santos as Patricia Montecillo-Villamines
- Piolo Pascual as Jordan Villamines

Main cast

- Coney Reyes as Mayla Lizandro-Montecillo - Patricia (biological), Sheila (adoptive) & Adrian's mother, but she's supposed to be a stepmother of Patricia in first scene.
- Edu Manzano as Armand Montecillo † - Chandro, Patricia & Adrian's father and Sheila's adoptive father
- Zsa Zsa Padilla as Nieves Quevedo-Pacheco † - Patricia (adoptive), Abby & Chandro's mother.
- Julia Clarete as Sheila Montecillo-Samonte - Star's biological daughter
- John Lloyd Cruz as Adrian Montecillo † - younger son of Mayla & Armand, also a younger brother of Patricia (biological) & Sheila (adoptive) and Chandro's younger half-brother.
- Armida Siguion-Reyna † as Lourdes Lizandro † - Mayla's mother and Adrian, Patricia (biological) and Sheila (adoptive)'s grandmother
- Cherie Gil † as Star † - Sheila's biological mother.
- Mark Gil † as Mr. De Guzman † - Abby's father.
- Rosemarie Gil as Emilia Villamines - Jordan and Dante's mother and also Patricia's mother-in-law.

Also as main cast

- Angelica Panganiban as Abby De Guzman - Nieves's younger daughter from Mr. De Guzman.
- Cherry Pie Picache as Becky Pagsisisihan - Patricia's godmother.
- Carlo Aquino as Eman Dela Cruz - son of Arsing from his first wife.
- Romnick Sarmenta as Chandro † - Dra. Enriquez's adoptive son, but also he's a biological son of Armand & Nieves and Patricia's long-lost half-brother.
- Timmy Cruz as Dra. Enriquez - Chandro (adoptive) and Adelaine's mother.
- Isabel Granada † as Adelaine Enriquez † - Dra. Enriquez's daughter and also she's a long-lost biological daughter of Franco.

Supporting cast

- Priscilla Almeda as Joey †
- Steven Alonzo as Adrian's friend
- Jackie Castillejos as Cleo †
- Menggie Cobarrubias † as Ramil †
- Alma Concepcion as Benilda Villamines
- Mymy Davao as Elaine
- Hazel Espiñosa as Gemma Rose - Arsing's second wife.
- Daniel Fernando as Turing † - He's knows the truth about Patricia, Chandro and Shelia's true identities.
- Vivian Foz as Evelyn
- Glenda Garcia as Lani's mother
- Gino Paul Guzman as Red Bernardo
- Kathleen Hermosa as Babette
- Simon Ibarra as Dr. Neil Guanzon
- Cherry Lou as Julie
- Manjo del Mundo as Prison Warden
- Aiza Marquez as Lani
- Aya Medel as Dante's mistress
- Pen Medina as Abner Pacheco - Nieves' drunk husband.
- Melissa Mendez as Nelia Domingo - Carlo's aunt and also Patricia's godmother.
- Matthew Mendoza as Dante Villamines - Jordan's elder brother and also Patricia's brother-in-law.
- L.A. Mumar as Carlo Samonte
- Belinda Panelo as Isabel Borromeo
- Lito Pimentel as Arsing Dela Cruz - Eman's father.
- Efren Reyes Jr. as Mr. Tordesillas
- RJ Rosales † as Dexter Tolentino †
- Caridad Sanchez as Lolita Quevedo - Nieves's mother and Patricia (adoptive) Abby & Chandro (biological)'s grandmother.
- Jeffrey Santos as Virgo de Padua †
- Michael Conan as Fadz †
- Leni Santos as Elena
- Monsour del Rosario as Mario † - Jordan and Patricia's Friend as Long Life.

Recurring, extended and guest casts

- Yul Servo as Epoy
- Jennifer Sevilla as Dr. Escoto
- Maricar Fernandez as Wendy - a prostitute contact by Chandro to have sex photo in a Hotel Room with Jordan.
- Joel Torre as Franco Dequiros Montecillo † - Adelaine's biological father.
- Vic Vargas † as Mr. Villamines †
- Ann Villegas as Shiela's Cellmate †
- Dick Ysrael † as Tats † - Shiela's biological father.

== Production ==
In 2001, ABS-CBN reached its peak with its "timeless and memorable" telenovelas Pangako Sa 'Yo and Recuerdo de Amor. The series united fellow actors Judy Ann Santos and Piolo Pascual after their successful team-up in the phenomenal drama Esperanza the series would also be remembered as one of their chronicled team ups before their future roles especially the Award Winning Soap Sa Piling Mo in 2006. The series also served acclaim for Award Winning veteran actors Edu Manzano, Zsa Zsa Padilla, Coney Reyes and Armida Siguion-Reyna.
