= Mara Clara =

1992–97 Philippine television drama series

- Title card from 1992 to 1995
- Genre: Drama
- Created by: Emil Cruz, Jr.
- Written by: Emil Cruz, Jr.
- Directed by: Emil Cruz, Jr.
- Starring: Judy Ann Santos; Gladys Reyes
- Theme music composer: Nonong Buencamino; Amado Lacuesta
- Opening theme: "Mara Clara" by Therese Amper (short version; 1992–1996)
- Ending theme: "Mara Clara" by Therese Amper "Mula sa Puso" by Jude Michael (series finale)
- Country of origin: Philippines
- Original language: Tagalog (Filipino)
- No. of seasons: 2
- No. of episodes: 1,130

Production
- Executive producer: Annaliza A. Goma
- Producers: Maru R. Benitez (Season 1); Dagang V. Vilbar (Season 2)
- Editor: Rachel Aguilos
- Running time: 30 minutes
- Production company: ABS-CBN Entertainment

Original release
- Network: ABS-CBN
- Release: August 17, 1992 – February 14, 1997

Related
- Mara Clara (2010–2011)

Mara Clara is a Philippine television drama series broadcast by ABS-CBN. Starring Judy Ann Santos and Gladys Reyes, it aired on the network's afternoon line up from August 17, 1992 to February 14, 1997, replacing Sebya, Mahal Kita and was replaced by Esperanza. It is the second longest-running drama series of ABS-CBN, after FPJ's Ang Probinsyano.

The title is derived from María Clara, the mestiza heroine of José Rizal's Noli Me Tángere. It is a first release from Dreamscape Entertainment upon its establishment in 1992.

This series is streaming online on YouTube.

== Premise ==
=== Book 1 ===
==== The Switched Daughters: Mara and Clara ====
In a shocking turn of events at birth, Mara (Judy Ann Santos) and Clara (Gladys Reyes) were secretly switched, a deception meticulously documented in the diary of hospital staff member Kardo (Dan Fernandez).

The fateful day began with Almira and Susan giving birth. Tragedy struck when Kardo accidentally caused the death of one of Susan's twins. To conceal his grave error, Kardo covertly swapped Almira's newborn with Susan's deceased infant, leading Amanthe to mistakenly believe their own daughter had died. Seizing this opportunity, Gary took his surviving baby and placed her with the affluent Del Valle family.

This intricate web of lies resulted in Mara, Almira's biological daughter, being raised in poverty by Susan (Susan Africa) and Gary Davis (Eruel Tongco). Meanwhile, Clara, Susan and Gary's true daughter, grew up in wealth under the care of Amanthe (Juan Rodrigo) and Almira Del Valle (Beverly Vergel), setting the stage for a life of mistaken identities and concealed truths.

==== A Twisted Fate ====
The benevolent Del Valle couple, members of a philanthropic and wealthy family that prospers in both publishing and car manufacturing, unknowingly take in their biological daughter, Mara, as a servant and fund her education.

Meanwhile, Gary (Eruel Tongco), a notorious gang and syndicate leader, approves of Mara living with the Del Valles, intending to extort money from them. As Mara navigates her new life, Clara, the Del Valle's adopted daughter, makes her life exceedingly difficult.

Earlier, Enrico (Noel Colet), Almira’s adopted brother, plotted against the Del Valle family. His malicious schemes were thwarted when his leadership of a gun-running syndicate was exposed, forcing him to flee to the United States.

==== Gary Davis: A Web of Deceit and Criminality ====
Mara's life was a torment at the hands of Gary Davis. He subjected her to suffering, even orchestrating her kidnapping and a fake rescue to appear heroic. Throughout this ordeal, her adoptive mother, Susan, remained a steadfast source of love. Gary was also unfaithful to Susan, engaging in an affair with Lenita (Leni Santos), who had a past romantic link with Amanthe.

Gary's abuse led to Susan's repeated mental breakdowns, culminating in her living as a beggar before eventually recovering. Beyond his manipulative nature, Gary rose to power as a syndicate leader, relentlessly extorting the Del Valle family and even using their money to establish his own business. Even while incarcerated, Gary, alongside inmates Waldo and later Negro (Enrico’s former henchman), continued his criminal enterprises. At one point, Gary and Lenita conspired to dismantle the Del Valle family through elaborate schemes.

==== Clara: The Spoiled and Manipulative Adopted Daughter ====
Clara lived a pampered life as the adored adopted daughter of Almira and Amanthe, who indulged her every whim. In stark contrast to Mara, Clara was arrogant and looked down on everyone, including the household staff (Nanay Binay and Querubin) and adopted family members (Jepoy and Eris).

During Almira and Amanthe's vacation, Almira's strict and conservative cousin, Marina (Carol Dauden), managed the household. Despite her nature, Marina was easily manipulated by Clara, who mirrored her biological father Gary's cunning. While Clara briefly showed signs of conscience after learning Mara was the true Del Valle daughter, she quickly succumbed to Gary's influence, letting greed and a craving for wealth and attention consume her.

==== Mara: A Life of Kindness and Shifting Identities ====
Mara, a kind-hearted and intelligent girl, was the antithesis of Clara. Despite Almira's initial coldness, she developed a profound maternal bond with Mara, a bond stronger than any she felt for Clara. Raised by Susan and her godmothers, Ninang CG (Eagle Riggs) and Ninang Lagring (Minnie Aguilar), Mara was instilled with strong values.

As fate would have it, the Del Valle family adopted Mara and even provided her with a college scholarship, leading to Mara and Clara living under the same roof. When Clara discovered her true identity as Gary's daughter and Almira learned of this, many assumed Mara and Clara were biological siblings. This revelation, however, plunged Mara into an identity crisis, making her question her own origins and suspecting she might be the true Del Valle heir

==== Unraveling the Truth in Book 1 ====
Book 1 centers on the intense conflict between Gary Davis and Kardo, as Kardo vehemently opposed Gary's malicious plots against Mara and the Del Valle family. Gary, however, cunningly manipulated the truth, falsely claiming Mara's biological mother was his ex-girlfriend, Edna (Myrna Castillo).

The pivotal piece of evidence confirming Mara's true Del Valle identity was Kardo's diary. After changing hands multiple times, the diary finally reached Jepoy (Paolo Contis), who placed it in Almira's room. Upon reading it, Almira discovered the truth: Mara was her real daughter. Kardo further corroborated this revelation in a phone call to Almira, leaving no doubt.

The plot escalated with Gary's mysterious death by an unknown assailant. Speculation pointed to syndicate leader Tamaguchi, with Nakamura of the Yakuza as a suspect. Tragically, Almira fell into a coma after reading the diary and uncovering the truth about Mara.

==== Louie's Vengeance and the Final Reckoning ====
With Gary's death, his half-sister, Louie (Maila Gumila), stepped in, determined to uphold his criminal legacy. Even more notorious than Gary, Louie, recently released from prison, continued his illicit activities with numerous henchmen, including Waldo and Negro. Believing the Del Valle family responsible for Gary's death, not the syndicate, Louie sought revenge.

Louie and her niece, Clara, conspired to destroy Mara and the Del Valle family. However, Lenita refused to partake in Louie's schemes. Louie then kidnapped Mara, demanding a staggering PHP 100,000,000 ransom from Amanthe, and accidentally shot Clara during the hostage crisis. Fortunately, the police, aided by Kardo, Berting, and Simeon, rescued them, leading to Louie's arrest and injury.

In the end, good triumphed. Damages were paid, Clara apologized to Mara for her actions, and Mara forgave her. All characters ultimately found their rightful place.

=== Book 2 ===
Title Card for Ikalawang Yugto (Book 2)

==== A Twisted Homecoming: Enrico's Return ====
After years in an American prison, Almira's evil half-brother, Enrico (played by Noel Colet in Book 1 and Jeffrey Santos in Book 2), returns to Metro Manila. He has undergone plastic surgery, now assuming the identity of Henry Villafuerte, and is bent on revenge against the Del Valle family, particularly Almira.

He manipulates and brainwashes Clara, urging her to continue her wicked ways and resent the Del Valles. Meanwhile, dark flashbacks haunt Almira's nightmares, and Henry fuels her torment by making her believe she orchestrated Gary's death. However, it's later revealed that Enrico/Henry was the true killer of Gary Davis.

==== New Threats Emerge for Mara ====
The story opens with Mara shot by an unknown assailant at her welcome party as a Del Valle. She is saved by Derrick (Rico Yan), an unlicensed intern doctor and son of wealthy Dr. Federico Villa, who performs surgery. Derrick, who is in love with Mara, has a complicated life due to a forced marriage to his girlfriend, Mitch (Erica Fife), and is a rival to Christian (Wowie De Guzman) for Mara's affections.

Despite finally living with her true parents, Mara faces new threats. Her uncle, Henry, along with Inggrid (Glydel Mercado), conspires to destroy the Del Valle family, with Inggrid attempting to seduce Amanthe. Meanwhile, Susan confronts Roy, who seeks revenge for his brother Gary's death and Louie's imprisonment. Additionally, Clara secretly schemes to claim her right as a Del Valle heiress. Fortunately, Roy is captured by the police with the help of Jun (Daniel Fernando).

==== Escalating Tensions and Deeper Betrayals ====
Chaos intensifies as Henry brainwashes Clara, convincing her that Almira orchestrated Gary's death. Clara, consumed by vengeance, vows to make the Del Valle family suffer and seize their inheritance.

Adding to the turmoil, a missing diary entry suggests Mara might be the product of Almira's sexual assault by Gary, rather than Amanthe's daughter. For Mara's safety amid the escalating chaos, Almira sends her back to Susan. This deeply saddens Mara, especially when Clara manipulates Susan into believing Almira caused Gary's death. Enraged, Susan turns against the Del Valle family, while Clara's hatred intensifies, fueling her determination to blame them for her father’s fate.

==== Henry's Blackmail and Almira's Ordeal ====
Captain Esguerra (Tom Olivar) discovered that Henry Villafuerte was indeed Enrico Castillo, linking him to syndicate activities. He informed Amanthe, but Almira resisted exposing Henry's identity. Her hesitation stemmed from Henry's blackmail: he threatened to reveal Gary had sexually abused her, a dark secret Almira desperately wanted to keep hidden.

Following her kidnapping, orchestrated by Henry and Ingrid, Almira was involved in a car accident. One of the two fatalities was mistakenly identified as Almira due to her ring, which the culprits had forcibly taken. Miraculously, Almira survived and was rescued by wealthy elderly couple Dante (Dante Castro) and Alicia (Raquel Montesa), who coincidentally had lost a daughter, Elena, who strikingly resembled Almira.

==== New Connections and Resolutions ====
After leaving the Del Valle mansion, Mara meets David (Piolo Pascual), the son of Alicia and Dante, along with Mariel (Nikka Valencia) and their daughter Angela (Bianca Aguila).

Following a tense confrontation with the Del Valle family, Henry is shot dead by the authorities. In a separate confrontation, Clara almost kills Mara. Mara fully recovers, while Clara is admitted to a mental institution due to her severe mental conditions. The Del Valles then depart for the United States.

== Cast and characters ==
=== Protagonist ===
- Judy Ann Santos-Agoncillo as Mara Davis / Mara del Valle

=== Antagonist ===
- Gladys Reyes-Sommereux as Clara del Valle / Clara Davis

=== Main cast ===
- Juan Rodrigo as Amanthe del Valle
- Beverly Vergel as Almira Castillo-del Valle/Elena
- Eruel Tongco (1992–1996) and William Martinez (movie, 1996) as Gerardo "Gary" Davis (Note: Eruel Tongco originally played the Gary Davis character from 1992 until his death in 1996. Tongco was replaced by William Martinez for film adaption.)
- Susan Africa as Susan Davis/Violeta
- Leni Santos as Lenita/Sylvia (Book 1)
- Dan Fernandez as Ricardo "Kardo" Enriquez
- Minnie Aguilar as Lagring
- Michael "Eagle" Riggs as Canuto "CG" Garcia
- Noel Colet (Book 1)/Jeffrey Santos (Book 2) as Enrico Castillo/Henry Villafuerte
- Maila Gumila as Louie (Book 1)
- Wowie de Guzman as Christian "Chris" Cruz
- Rico Yan as Derick Villa (Book 2)

=== Supporting cast ===
==== Book 1 ====
- Paolo Contis as Jepoy
- Christopher Roxas as Erris Reyes
- Naty Mallares as Lola Binay
- Ading Noche as Dado
- Jochelle Olalia as Karen
- Agatha Tapan as Denise
- Carol Magallanes as Carol
- Debbie Espileta (credited as Debbie Domingo) as Debbie
- Rolly Padilla as Simeon
- Mariche Marquez as Che-Che
- Daniel Fernando as Jun
- Carol Dauden as Marina
- Roland Sanchez as Roland
- Romeo Pacheco as Pacheco
- Robert Perez as Berting
- Vincent Cebu as Negro
- Willy Delgado as Waldo
- Yuichiro Enomoto as Nakamura
- Myrna Castillo as Edna

==== Book 2 ====
- Glydel Mercado as Inggrid
- Angelika Dela Cruz as Joyce
- Tom Olivar as Sgt. Esguerra
- Dinky Doo Jr. as John
- Pocholo Montes as Dr. Federico Villa
- Piolo Pascual as David
- Nikka Valencia as Mariel
- Jackie Aquino as Atty. Buencamino
- JR Herrera as Brando
- Raquel Montesa as Alicia
- Dante Castro as Dante
- Bianca Aguila as Angela
- Arnie Lazo as Nonong
- Solomon Credo as Rambo
- Joseph Reyes as Udoy
- Baron Geisler as Temyong
- Lucy Quinto as Aling Sepa
- Cris Daluz as Mang Bino
- Jake Tagaso as Tata Ponso
- Anne Villegas as Barbara
- Errol Dionisio as Tiyong

=== Other Cast Members ===
==== Book 1 ====
- Eva Darren as Aida
- Whitney Tyson (TV series, 1992–1995) and Jinky Oda (movie) as Kerubin
- Jenette Fernando as Risa
- John Salve as Lester
- Edward Salvador as Joe Llamera
- Bangkay as Praning

==== Book 2 ====
- Erika Fife as Mitch Villa
- Nita Grandea as Bridgette
- Xenia Absalon as Dulce
- Francis Enriquez as Jojo
- Lorna Lopez as Gigi

== Production ==
After the cancellation of Ula, Ang Batang Gubat, director Emil Cruz Jr. conceptualized a soap opera entitled "Mara Clara" and was presented to ABS-CBN for approval. Judy Ann Santos and Gladys Reyes were handpicked by the director for the titular roles. During the early years of the soap, majority of scenes, particularly the Del Valle mansion are shot inside the studio. It was around their second year that the series started shooting on an actual location.

On May 19, 1996, cast members Eruel Tongco, Ireneo Sevilla, Joy Clarise Cojuangco and Bienvenido dela Rosa died when their vehicle fell into a ravine in Palayan while driving home from a Nueva Ecija stage presentation. To fill in the sudden demise of the actor, they introduced Louie, the previously-unspoken sibling of Gary played by Maila Gumila to continue what could have been the storyline of Gary. However in the movie version which was shot the same year, they picked William Martinez to play the role of Gary. They eventually replaced Gumila's character as main antagonist during the end of Book 1 by Henry/Enrico, played by Jeffrey Santos on their second season.

=== Broadcast ===
==== Timeslot ====
The series originally aired at 2:30 p.m. as an afternoon drama series produced by its original director Emil Cruz Jr. from August 17, 1992, until September 30, 1994, after Anna Luna. It moved to a 2:00 p.m. timeslot on October 3, 1994, when its predecessor Anna Luna moved from the said network to RPN. The show's rights was later on purchased by ABS-CBN Entertainment and was moved to an evening slot on July 1, 1996 with its reformatted as a primetime drama series, after TV Patrol to challenge RPN's Tagalog-language dub of Mexican telenovela, Marimar and Villa Quintana of GMA. It ended on February 14, 1997, to make way for Esperanza as the replacement on February 17.

==== Reruns ====
The series re-aired in 2007 by affiliates Studio 23 (then S+A and now Aliw Channel 23) and Kapamilya Channel (international subsidiary of The Filipino Channel) through 2008. It aired internationally in 1994 until its series finale on The Filipino Channel when it first aired as same-day airings. It then re-aired in 2007–2008 for the first time on Kapamilya Channel. The series was uploaded on Jeepney TV's YouTube Channel.

== Adaptations ==
=== Film adaptation ===
On September 18, 1996, a movie was produced based on the television series. This was the first television series created by ABS-CBN to be adapted by Star Cinema.

In the film, Gary Davis' character was changed. It was portrayed by Eruel Tongco in the series, while William Martinez played the role in the film due to Tongco's death from a car accident in 1996.

Additionally, Qureubin was originally portrayed by Whitney Tyson in the series but Jinky Oda portrayed the character in the film following a series of bullying cases to Tyson during shoots leading eventually to her withdrawal from the series.

=== Remake ===
During the ABS-CBN trade event held on August 24, 2010, at the World Trade Center Manila, it was announced that a remake of the series will start its production in 2010. Kathryn Bernardo is slated for the role of Mara, with Julia Montes as Clara. It aired on ABS-CBN from October 25, 2010, to June 3, 2011.

== Difference between series and movie ==
Series	Movie version
Later in the series, Kardo revealed the shocking truth to Gary: Mara was not his biological daughter.	From the very beginning, Gary knew that Mara was not his biological daughter.
Susan attacked Lenita after she ordered Mara to wash her clothes.	Consumed by rage after discovering Gary's affair with Lenita, Susan lashed out, attacking her in a fit of fury.
Clara brought the diary with her to the mansion.	Kardo entrusted the diary to Clara after she learned the truth about her identity.
Clara overheard a conversation between Amanthe and Gary, during which she learned that she was their daughter of Susan and the latter.	Witnessing Clara hurting her mother, Amanthe revealed to her that she was Gary and Susan's daughter.
To prevent Susan and Kardo from revealing Mara's true parentage – Amanthe and Almira – Gary kidnapped her.	Gary kidnapped Mara after Clara revealed that everyone knew she was Amanthe and Almira's biological daughter.
Almira learned she and Amanthe were Mara's true parents through Kardo's diary and a subsequent phone call from him.	Upon reading Kardo's diary, Almira's suspicions were confirmed: she and Amanthe were indeed Mara's true parents.
Louie ordered her henchmen to kidnapped Mara directly.	Gary tricked Mara, telling her that he would bring her to her real parents but kidnapped her instead.
Louie was shot and wounded by a police officer after she attempted to kill Amanthe.	Gary was shot to death by Kardo and Amanthe simultaneously.
Mara was shot during her welcoming party.	This didn't happen in the movie version since Clara accepted her fate and was part of the party.
Almira was allegedly killed by kidnappers during a car bomb suicide.	Almira did not die in the movie.

== Reception ==
The series had its highest rating of 45% in one of its episode in 1994, it is considered as one of the highest rating Filipino TV series of all time.

The TV series made waves through most of the Filipino audience and being called by ABS-CBN as, "Ina ng Pinoy Soap Opera" owing to the series' huge success.

The highly-overt antagonism of Gladys Reyes' main antagonist character, Clara, by way of her violent actions done throughout the series against Judy's character, Mara, had provoked a huge reaction on those who viewed the show's protagonist Mara, more favorably, such to the point that Gladys Reyes had earned the title "Bella Flores of the 90's".

== See also ==
- List of programs broadcast by ABS-CBN
- List of telenovelas of ABS-CBN
- Mara Clara (2010 TV series)
