= Tina Paner =

Filipino singer and actress

- Born: Kristina Paner; August 1, 1971 (age 55); Manila, Philippines
- Other name: Tina Paner
- Education: Miriam College
- Occupations: Actress, singer
- Years active: 1982–present
- Parent(s): Manny Paner (father); Daisy Romualdez (mother)
- Family: Danita Paner (sister); Karl Paner (brother)

Kristina "Tina" Paner (born August 1, 1971) is a Filipino actress and singer.

== Early life ==
At a very young age, Paner's parents noticed her interest in music. Her adoptive parents were prominent celebrities as well. Her father Manny Paner was a well known basketball player while her mother Daisy Romualdez was an actress in the 1960s. Paner is the sister of Danita Paner, who is also a singer.

== Career ==
Paner's parents convinced her to try singing at the age of nine and the song "Sana" was popularized by her. She tried acting too aged 10 when she starred in the film Sinasamba Kita as the young Lorna Tolentino who played the character role of Nora. She also did a Colgate commercial called "Colgate Winterfresh Gel" with fellow Triplets members Manilyn Reynes and Sheryl Cruz in the 1980s.

By that time, her mother, having seen her acting potential, presented Kristina, then only 12, to Regal Films owner and producer Mother Lily Monteverde. She was soon offered a contract. She became a regular in television shows like Musmos Pa Si Boss with Niño Muhlach as the Boss, Ora Engkantada, and Wanbol High. She also became a cast of the youth-oriented variety show That's Entertainment.

In 1989, she had two launching films in Regal Films. These were Tamis ng Unang Halik, the film formerly titled Pepay Paypay and Huwag Kang Hahalik Sa Diyablo. That same year, the song "Tamis ng Unang Halik" became her signature song from her self-titled album. This song was also sung by Sharon Cuneta from the film Kaputol ng Isang Awit in 1991 under VIVA Films.

In 1990, she was nominated for Best Performance by a Female Recording Artist on Awit Awards for the song "Tamis ng Unang Halik". Alongside her were her fellow That's Entertainment co-stars Manilyn Reynes, Sheryl Cruz, Lea Salonga and Rachel Alejandro who were among the nominees. At that time, it was only Manilyn Reynes who had two songs nominated on that same category but in the end it was Rachel Alejandro who was announced the winner for her rendition of the song "Kay Tagal".

On June 6, 1994, Paner had her first major concert in Greenhills Theater entitled 'On My Own... Kristina Paner' with her as special guests were Rico J. Puno, Marco Sison, John Nite, Janno Gibbs and Chris de Venecia, and directed by Al Quinn. She sang the songs "The Nearness of You" a classic song which became very popular at that time from the PLDT commercial, "Let's Do the Twist/Let's Twist Again" medley, "Out Here on My Own" as popularized by Irene Cara, her singles "Tamis ng Unang Halik" and "Umiibig Ka Pala Sa Akin", and many others. The concert was under DR Productions in cooperation with Congressional Spouses Foundation, Inc.

In the mid-1990s, Paner also had the privilege to sing a duet with Tony Bennett with the song "I Left My Heart in San Francisco" when Bennett asked anyone in the audience to sing with him on stage and she volunteered to sing with him in his concert in the U.S.

In 2003, she transferred residence to Spain where she had a daughter with a Filipino-Spaniard.

In 2013, she came back to Manila with her daughter Luisane Kristiel. She has since been active in acting on television series.

On April 21, 2013, she did a show at Zirkoh Tomas Morato with her sister Danita Paner with Ferown band, Sam Milby and Rico J. Puno. She sang a duet with Sam Milby on the song "Bakit Ngayon Ka Lang". The show was produced by DR Productions.

In 2014, Paner had a series of shows at Casino Filipino (PAGCOR), at Mactan Satellite with Ramon Christopher (Feb. 12) and at 365 Plaza Satellite in San Nicolas, Ilocos Norte (Feb. 28). The other show was with her fellow Triplet member Manilyn Reynes.

In April 2014, she showed her other talent, dancing, which she learned from That's Entertainment and applied it on the show Celebrity Dance Battle for two Saturdays on TV5. Her challengers were actress Iwa Moto and showbiz news writer Shalala.

On May 22, 2014, Lea Salonga wrote an article in the Philippine Daily Inquirer titled "Letting Young Voices Be Heard" wherein she mentioned both Kristina Paner and Manilyn Reynes; "...Here's the thing: Young artists are impressionable and malleable, which is a wonderful thing. If and when influenced the right way, you create a singer who carries not only proper technique coupled with emotional accessibility, but a great respect for their chosen art form. That was something cultivated very early on in me, and in many child singers back in the day. Voices of young singers like Kristina Paner and Manilyn Reynes always deserved respect not only because the tonal quality was just beautiful, but also because they were also able to express themselves clearly and from the heart. Theirs are voices I will be looking to for guidance as I coach my wards in preparation for battles."

On July 17, 2016, Regine Velasquez's cookbook Bongga sa Kusina was launched and it featured the recipe titled "Tina Paner's Sinigang na Lechon" in one of its collections of delicacies when she guested on Velasquez's TV show Sarap Diva. The recipe also featured a picture of Paner's face beside the recipe title.

On September 9, 2017, she had a concert at the Music Museum with Manilyn Reynes and Sheryl Cruz titled 'The Triplet Concert' with guests from the series Meant to Be; Addy Raj, Ivan Dorschner, Jak Roberto and Ken Chan.

In April 2019, Paner and her daughter Shane modeled for Style Stellar – The House of Bea Bianca launch.

Her other name according to her was Ma. Kharine Gomez written in the That's Entertainment magazine in the late 1980s.

On April 30, 2020, Tina and her fellow co-stars from That's Entertainment namely Manilyn Reynes, Sheryl Cruz, Keempee de Leon, Romnick Sarmenta, Ramon Christopher Gutierrez, and Janno Gibbs reunited on a music video of Janno Gibbs's instagram page titled "That's Quarantainment".

== Filmography ==
=== Film ===
- Juan Balutan (1982)
- Sinasamba Kita (1982) – Young Nora
- I Have Three Hands (1985) – Maricar
- Mga Kwento ni Lola Basyang ("Querubin: Maria Leonora Theresa" segment, 1985) – Lalay
- When I Fall in Love (1986)
- Super Islaw and the Flying Kids (1986) – Tinang
- Batang Quiapo (1986)
- Payaso (1986)
- Bunsong Kerubin (1987) – Mylene
- Bobo Cop (1988)
- Wake Up Little Susie (1988)
- Love Letters ("Episode 2: Invisible Lover" segment, 1988)
- Petrang Kabayo at ang Pilyang Kuting (1988) – Cindy
- Starzan: Shouting Star of the Jungle (1989) – Marie
- Pulis, Pulis sa Ilalim ng Tulay (1989) – Cindy
- Tamis ng Unang Halik (1989) – Pepay/Jocelyn
- Huwag Kang Hahalik sa Diablo (1989) – Dianne
- Papa's Girl (1990)
- Lessons in Love (1990)
- I Have 3 Eggs (1990)
- Sana Maulit Muli (1995) – Daisy
- Barcelona (December 13, 2006) – herself
- Huwag Kang Lalabas: Hotel – Patricia/Patring (trilogy) Starring: Beauty Gonzalez in Kumbento; Aiko Melendez in Bahay; Kim Chiu in Hotel with Tina Paner, Jameson Blake and Allan Paule (December 25, 2021)
- The Women of TONTA Club "T.O.N.T.A. = The One N True Alliance" – as Lani Quintos
- Yorme: The Isko Domagoso Story (January 26, 2022) – Rosario Moreno
- Fall Guy – Starring: Sean de Guzman (May 23, 2023) – Viva Films – Carmen

=== Television ===
- Musmos Pa si Boss (1983 RPN 9) with Niño Muhlach as the Boss and her friend
- Pira-pirasong Pangarap – with Joel Torre, Liza Lorena, and Bayani Casimiro
- GMA Supershow, Germspesyal – guest (1980 – 1990 GMA 7)
- That's Entertainment (1986 GMA 7) Monday Group earlier with Ramon Christopher Guttierrez as her former love team / Friday Group later with Cris Villanueva as her new love team at that time."
- Saturday Entertainment (1986 GMA 7)
- Lovingly Yours, Helen (1987 GMA 7)
- Always, Snooky – with Manilyn Reynes and Sheryl Cruz performing the song "Mine, Mine, Mine" (1987 IBC 13)
- Regal Shockers (1988 GMA 7)
- Lotlot & Friends (1988 RPN 9)
- Mother Studio Presents produced by Regal Films – (for two episodes only) as Joyette the rebellious teenager and the other character where she portrayed an old mother, in her teenage years, to grown teenage girls in some other episode (1989 GMA 7)
- Photographs and Memories with Cathy Mora in one episode (1989 RPN 9)
- Young Love, Sweet Love (1989 RPN 9)
- Maricel Live (1989 IBC 13)
- The Sharon Cuneta Show – Herself Guest Performer with Manilyn Reynes and Sheryl Cruz (1989 ABS-CBN 2)
- Hapi House! (guest) it starred Tito Sotto, Sandy Andolong, Chuckie Dreyfus, Isabel Granada, Laura Hermosa and Aga Muhlach. (1989 IBC 13)
- Ora Engkantada with Romnick Sarmenta and Luz Fernandez as Lola Ora the narrator of the story in one of its episodes (1989 IBC 13)
- Wanbol High with Cheenee de Leon (1990 ABC 5)
- Palibhasa Lalake – guest – giving life to dead man (1990 ABS-CBN 2)
- Maalaala Mo Kaya (1991 ABS-CBN 2)
- Love Notes (1993 TV5)
- Noli Me Tangere (1994 TV5)
- Maalaala Mo Kaya: Patalim with Gary Estrada, Liza Lorena, Al Tantay, and Malou Crisologo (1994 ABS-CBN 2)
- Ryan Ryan Musikahan (1994 ABS-CBN 2) – Herself Guest Performer with Manilyn Reynes. Ryan Cayabyab a Filipino musician, composer and conductor had a conversation with both of them, Tina and Manilyn, and addressing them that they look like sisters. Kristina Paner sang her signature hit songs and the song "Used To Be" as popularized by singers Charlene and Stevie Wonder on a duet while Mr.Ryan Cayabyab played the piano.
- T.G.I.S. (1995 GMA 7)
- GMA Telecine Specials (1995 GMA 7) – guest
- Gimik (1996 ABS-CBN 2) – guest
- 1896 (1996 TV5)
- Click (2000 GMA 7) – guest
- ASAP Herself Guest Performer with folk singer Florante & Jolina Magdangal singing together the song "Sana" (2002 ABS-CBN)
- Magpakailanman (2005 GMA 7)
- Crazy for You (2006 ABS-CBN) Primetime TV Series
- Bandila – "Ikaw Na!" – guest (January 21, 2013 ABS-CBN)
- Wansapanataym: "Ang mga nawawalang Ngipin ni Tootsie" (2013 ABS-CBN)
- My Little Juan, Vivian (2013 ABS-CBN)
- Maalaala Mo Kaya: "Saranggola", Arlene (2013 ABS-CBN)
- ASAP Herself Guest Performer with Sheryl Cruz & Manilyn Reynes (2013 ABS-CBN)
- Party Pilipinas Herself Guest Performer with Sheryl Cruz and Manilyn Reynes (February 2013 GMA 7)
- The Ryzza Mae Show with daughter (2013 – 2015 GMA 7)
- ASOP Music Festival – ASOP (A Song of Praise) Music Festival (2013 UNTV) – herself singing "Tamis Ng Unang Halik" and the composer Mr. Mon del Rosario. The show is hosted by Toni Rose Gayda and balladeer RichardReynoso.
- Pepito Manaloto (2013 GMA 7)
- Sarap Diva with Manilyn Reynes and Sheryl Cruz (March 9, 2013 GMA 7)
- 50 Years with the MASTER SHOWMAN (April 2013 GMA 7)
- Tunay na Buhay – guest with Sheryl Cruz (September 12, 2013 GMA 7)
- Banana Nite – "Ihaw Na!" – guest – (September 23, 2013 ABS-CBN)
- The Singing Bee (Philippine game show) Herself Guest Performer with Bugoy Drilon, Sheryl Cruz, Rez Cortez, Tirso Cruz III, & Dennis Padilla (December 7, 2013 ABS-CBN)
- Let's Ask Pilipinas (January 27, 2014 TV5) – (hosted by Aga Muhlach) – Herself Guest with Ms. Lea Salonga, William Martinez, and Lorenzo Mara. A reunion of the casts of the movie "Sana Maulit Muli" by Star Cinema.
- Maalaala Mo Kaya: "Mikropono – The Rose Fostanes Story" – X Factor Israel winner – as Mel with Viveika Ravanes as Rose 'Osang' Fostanes (March 22, 2014 ABS-CBN)
- Cornered by Cristy: The Story of Tina Paner – (2014 TV5)
- Strawberry Lane – Salve 'Marcela' Rosales (2014 GMA 7)
- Celebrity Dance Battle (2014 TV5) (hosted by Lucy Torres-Gomez) – Celebrity Dancer for two Saturdays with Iwa Moto and Shalala as her competitor/challenger
- Magpakailanman: Dalawang kasarian: The Jonalyn Bulado Story – as Emma with Lauren Young as Jonalyn Bulado (July 5, 2014 GMA 7)
- Moments (talk show) – also named MOMents – 25th Season – hosted by Ms. Gladys Reyes – guest (August 9, 2014 Net 25)
- Trenderas as Veronica Sanchez (September 13 – December 27, 2014 TV5) – with Lara Maigue, Katrina 'SuklayDiva' Velarde, Isabelle de Leon, Ara Mina, Dingdong Avanzado, Cacai Bautista, K Brosas, and Kitkat
- Happy Wife, Happy Life (hosted by L.J. Moreno) (guest) Tina Paner and her daughter Shayne Paner at Ginhawa Spa & Dining (TV5)
- Tim Yap Show – guest (October 11, 2014 1:49 am GMA 7)
- Maynila: Happy Ending with Ruru Madrid, Gabbi Garcia, and Ramon Christopher Guttierrez (November 8, 2014 GMA 7)
- Maalaala Mo Kaya:Banana Que – "The Elha Nympha Story" – as Digna with Nikki Valdez, Brenna Garcia as Elha Nympha, and Matt Evans (2015 ABS-CBN 2)
- Healing Hearts (2015 GMA 7) as Alice Trajano with Joyce Ching and Kristoffer Martin
- Maynila: Status: Its Complicated (2015 GMA 7)
- Maynila: Bilango ng Kahapon (2015 GMA 7)
- Bulaga Pa More!: Musical Pa More! – Kristina Paner singing the Broadway song "On My Own (Les Misérables song)" from Les Misérables (2015 GMA 7)
- Dangwa (2015 GMA 7)
- Sunday All Stars – guest (2015 GMA 7)
- Just Duet (2016 GMA 7)
- Wish Ko Lang: Masakit Ang Umibig – as Linda Salvan with Rainier Castillo, Elle Ramirez, and Cris Villanueva (January 22, 2016 GMA 7)
- The Master Showman's Final Bow (February 2016 GMA 7)
- Magpakailanman: Bagong pag-asa ni lola – as Yolly with Gloria Romero, Lindsay De Vera and Tina Monasterio (April 2, 2016 GMA 7)
- Imbestigador with Pen Medina as the murderer (2016 GMA 7)
- Laff, Camera, Action! – ContraDiva (2016 GMA 7)
- That's My Amboy – Rhea Medrano (2016 GMA 7)
- Lip Sync Battle Philippines: Manilyn Reynes vs. Keempee de Leon – Special Appearance with Sheryl Cruz (May 7, 2016 GMA 7)
- FPJ's Ang Probinsyano – as Teressa "Teri" Porres guest for one season with Angelica Panganiban as drug mules in Hong Kong (June 2016 ABS-CBN)
- Family Feud (Philippine game show) – "ASAP Sessionistas vs. That's Girls" – (game show) (June 25, 2016 ABS-CBN) – with Rachel Alejandro, Sitti, and other members of each team.
- Dear Uge: Paano Nga Ba Mag Move On? – as Lovely with Bianca Umali and Miguel Tanfelix (2016 GMA 7)
- Magpakailanman: Anak sa mundo ng droga (2016 GMA 7)
- Pinoy M.D.: discovering healthier bread and cookies with Tina Paner – Tina Paner is baking "Kalabasa Pan de Sal" and "Malunggay Cookies" (August 6, 2016 GMA 7)
- Mars (Philippine TV series) – guest (December 29, 2016 GMA NEWS TV)
- Tonight with Arnold Clavio – guest (2014, 2017, and 2018 GMA NEWS TV)
- Celebrity Bluff – contestant (2016 – 2018 GMA 7)
- Unang Hirit – guest with Sheryl Cruz and Manilyn Reynes (January 6, 2017 GMA 7)
- Idol sa Kusina – "Tinola with Gata" – guest with Sheryl Cruz and Manilyn Reynes (January 15, 2017 GMA NEWS TV)
- Sarap Diva TBT Throw Back Thursday with Manilyn Reynes and Sheryl Cruz (February 4, 2017 GMA 7)
- Dear Uge: Kutis Tisay – as Yaya O with Andre Paras, Kate Valdez, and Sheryl Cruz (February 12, 2017 GMA 7)
- Wowowin: OPM Battle, Triple Js vs Triplets – as Celebrity Contestant with Sheryl Cruz, Manilyn Reynes, Jude Michael, Jeremiah, and Jireh Lim (March 6, 2017 GMA 7)
- Wish Ko Lang: Manliligaw – with Joyce Ching as Kris the possessed/sanib victim and Billy James (March 18, 2017 GMA 7)
- People vs. the Stars – Celebrity Contestant with Gladys Reyes and Angelu de Leon (April 2, 2017 GMA 7)
- Meant to Be – Suzy Altamirano (2017 GMA 7)
- Magpakailanman: DonitaNose On MPKStory (2017 GMA 7)
- Wish Ko Lang: Mag-ina – as Lolit with actress Jazz Ocampo as her daughter (2017 GMA 7)
- Daig Kayo ng Lola Ko : Si Crispin, walang tigil kumain with Renz Valerio and Simon Ibarra (July 16, 2017 GMA 7)
- Dear Uge: Babe Bodyguard – as Barbie's Mother with Antonio Aquitania and Alyanna Asistio (2017 GMA 7)
- Tadhana: Bagahe – as Norma the OFW mother who works as a Domestic Helper who was stricken by cancer with Robert Ortega as her husband, John Manalo as her son, and Dang Cruz as her fellow OFW (July 22, 2017 GMA 7)
- Road Trip (TV series) – Guimaras province with Manilyn Reynes and Sheryl Cruz (September 24, 2017 GMA 7)
- All Star Videoke with Sheryl Cruz as All-star laglagers (October 1, 2017 GMA 7)
- Daig Kayo ng Lola Ko : Darling, ang pangit na duckling with Sophie Albert (November 5, 2017 GMA 7)
- Maynila: Anak Sa Puso – as Esther with Kristoffer Martin as her son and Cheska Diaz (November 11, 2017, GMA 7)
- Magpakailanman: Remember My Love: The Gerald Cruz and Noreen Maddatu Love Story – with Kris Bernal and Jason Abalos (February 3, 2018 GMA 7)
- Sunday PinaSaya – guest (2017 – 2018 GMA 7)
- Kambal, Karibal – Azon Martinez (2018 GMA 7)
- Inday Will Always Love You – Yaya Madonna (2018, GMA 7)
- Magpakailanman: The Kyline Alcantara Story – as Kyline's mother Rowena with Kyline Alcantara as herself and Jay Manalo as Kyline's father (May 5, 2018 GMA 7)
- Idol sa Kusina – "Herbed Fried Chicken" – guest with Alyana Asistio, Charlotte and Charice Hermoso (May 6, 2018 GMA NEWS TV)
- Maynila: Hinagpis Ng Ina – as Eleonor with Renz Valerio as her son (June 2, 2018, GMA 7)
- Daig Kayo ng Lola Ko : The Adventures of Laura Patola and Duwen-Ding!: Parts 1–5 as Laura's mother Nenita with Maine Mendoza and Baste(1st & 2nd episode)/Yuan Francisco(3rd, 4th, & 5th episode) (July 1, 8, 15, 22 & 29, 2018 GMA 7)
- Mars (Philippine TV series) – guest with Dennis Padilla cooking Tofu with Bokchoy recipe (August 20, 2018 GMA NEWS TV)
- Imbestigador: Dukot with Joanna Marie Tan (September 14, 2018 – Saturday; 4:45 pm. GMA 7)
- Wish Ko Lang: Lihim Ni Sonya – as Sonya with Archie Adamos and Yasser Marta (October 20, 2018; 4:10 pm. GMA 7)
- Dear Uge: Selfie Queen – as Mikee Quintos' Mother with Mikee Quintos, Gil Cuerva, Eunice Lagusad, and Juancho Triviño ( November 4, 2018; 2:30 pm. GMA 7)
- Tadhana: Pag-Uwi – as Cora the OFW mother who works in U.K. as a Caregiver with Martin del Rosario as her eldest son, Paul Salas as her younger son, Ashley Ortega as her daughter, Antonette Garcia as her fellow OFW, and Jhoana Marie Tan as her daughter-in-law wife of Martin del Rosario (December 22, 2018 GMA 7; 3:15 pm)
- TODA One I Love – Lea Hofilena-Dimagiba (Kylie Padilla's mother) (February 4, 2019 – April 17, 2019, GMA 7)
- Young Once (upon a Time) (season 2) – guest artist (March 17, 2019; Sunday; 8:00 pm. Net 25)
- Dear Uge: Yayo Aguilar – as Bekbek – Kitchen Housemaid (supporting role) with Gardo Versoza as Yayo Aguilar(disguised as a female nanny), Lucho Ayala, Kelvin Miranda, and Mosang (April 7, 2019; 2:30 pm. GMA 7)
- Videoke Dabarclash – guest artist with Rannie Raymundo, Renz Verano, Jett Pangan, Gino Padilla, and Lou Bonnevie with Dabarkads Paolo Ballesteros and Maine Mendoza (May 4, 2019; 12:00 pm. GMA 7)
- Dear Uge: Kabitana – as Petra with Angelu de Leon as Kapitana Lucy, and Manilyn Reynes as Rosie, Therese Malvar, Antonio Aquitania, and Jo Berry (July 14, 2019; 2:30 pm. GMA 7)
- Magpakailanman: My Viral Single Tatay – as Derrick's mother Vilma with Derrick Monasterio as Ken, Jenine Desiderio as Josephine, Faith da Silva as Mariel, Rosemarie Sarita as Lola Betty, and John Kenneth Giducos as young Ken (August 3, 2019 GMA 7)
- The Boobay and Tekla Show – guest with Gladys Reyes, Betong Sumaya, and Diana Zubiri (August 25, 2019 GMA 7)
- Wagas Presents: Wait Lang... Is This Love? – as Tita Sonya with Barbie Forteza, Jak Roberto, Yayo Aguila, Ayra Mariano, Ashley Ortega, and Kristoffer Martin (September 30, 2019–present 11:30 am. GMA 7)
- Bawal Kumurap, Nakamamatay ng Swerte! – guest artist with Sharmaine Arnaiz, Lilet, Jojo Alejar, Jaypee de Guzman, and Jeffrey Santos (October 17, 2019 – Thursday; 12:00 pm. GMA 7)
- Imbestigador: DALAWANG GINANG, PINAGHAHAMPAS, PINAGPAPALO AT PINAGSASAKSAK SA PAMPANGA with Dexter Doria and Lucho Ayala (October 26, 2019 – Saturday; 4:45 pm. GMA 7)
- Mars (Philippine TV series) (hosted by Camille Prats and Iya Villania) – guest with daughter Shane Paner (both singing the song "Tamis Ng Unang Halik") (December 12, 2019 – Thursday; 8:40 am. GMA 7)
- The Boobay and Tekla Show – guest – (na – TBATS Kulam) (December 15, 2019 – Sunday GMA 7)
- Bawal Judgmental – Special Appearance accompanying her daughter Shane Paner as guest to be picked by the contestant (December 24, 2019 – Tuesday; 12:00 pm. GMA 7)
- Madrasta (TV series) – guest – Nurse Rita (January 2, 3, & 6, 2020; 4:15 pm – GMA 7)
- All-Out Sundays – Special Participation (January 5, 2020; 12:00 pm – GMA 7)
- Dear Uge:"No Kiss, All Tell" & "Chis-miss Labandera" – as Selma with Gladys Reyes and Jelai Andres; Jason Abalos and Arra San Agustin (January 5, 2020; 2:30 pm. GMA 7)
- Ilaban Natin Yan!: Kalbaryo – Reina – with Sanya Lopez and Ahron Villena (March 7, 2020 – Saturday; 4:00 pm. GMA 7)
- Magpakailanman: Karma ng Ama – as Victor Neri's wife Ruth with Victor Neri, and Kelvin Miranda (March 28, 2020 GMA 7)
- Wish Ko Lang: Sakripisyo ng Ama – as Elena with Gardo Versoza, Anjo Damiles, and Miggs Cuaderno (August 15, 2020; 4:10 pm. GMA 7)
- Happy Time (TV program): Janno Gives – as guest (September 22, 2020; NET 25)
- It's Showtime (Philippine TV program): Hide and Sing – as guest – Showtime Happy 11th Tago Kanta #3 sings "Sayang Na Sayang" – song of Manilyn Reynes (October 24, 2020; A2Z)
- Mars (Philippine TV series)(hosted by Camille Prats and Iya Villania) – as guest cooking "Baked Tuna with Lemon and Mustard Sauce recipe" (November 13, 2020 – Friday; 9:00 am. GMA 7)
- Bawal Na Game Show (hosted by Wally Bayola and Paolo Ballesteros) – as guest with Ramon Christopher and Sharmaine Arnaiz (TV5)
- Bawal Judgmental – singing her first single "Sana" under VICOR Records (November 26, 2020; 12:00 pm. GMA 7)
- Wish Ko Lang: Sakristan/Inabuso – as Joel Palencia's Mother with Joel Palencia and Carlos Agassi (December 5, 2020; 4:10 pm. GMA 7)
- Chika, Besh! – as guest with Ramon Christopher (hosted by: Pauleen Luna, Pokwang, and Ria Atayde) (December 9, 2020; 7:30 am. TV5)
- Bawal Lumabas: The Series – as guest with Kim Chiu (iWantTFC)
- Bawal Judgmental – (January 23, 2021; 12:00 pm. GMA 7)
- The Lost Recipe – as Cayenne the H&B restaurant customer with Althea Ablan as her daughter (February 22 – March 2021; 8:00 pm. GTV)
- Game of the Gens – as guest with her daughter Shane Paner, and Robert Ortega with his niece Ysabel Ortega (hosted by: Andre Paras and Sef Cadayona) (March 7, 2021; 7;45 pm. GTV)
- Magpakailanman: Kaibigan sa Umaga, Aswang sa Gabi – as Arlene with Sheryl Cruz as the "Aswang" and Richard Quan as Arlene's husband (June 19, 2021 8:00 pm. GMA 7)
- Wish Ko Lang: Babaeng Unggoy – as one of Manilyn's friend with Manilyn Reynes as the "Babaeng Unggoy", Gladys Reyes, Almira Muhlach, Anna Vicente, and Ahron Villena (August 14 & 21, 2021; 4:10 pm. GMA 7)
- Cash Landing On You – Celebrity Home Partner (September 20, 2021; 12:00 pm. GMA 7)
- My Fantastic Pag-ibig: Sakalam – as Beth – Tim's Mom with Manolo Pedrosa as Tim, Pauline Mendoza as Sophie, Joshua Bulot as Malakas, Angela Alarcon as Maganda and Faith da Silva as Malihim (October 16, 23, & 30, 2021; 7:15 pm. GTV)
- Dear Uge:"Life Begins At Porky" – as Porschia with Aira Bermudez, John Feir, and Ella Cristofani (January 9, 2022; 2:30 pm. GMA 7)
- Wish Ko Lang: Babaeng Kandila – as Jessica – Jon Lucas's Mom with Ayra Mariano as Marissa the "Babaeng Kandila", Jon Lucas as Prince, Liezel Lopez as Matet, Ana de Leon, and Rowena Concepcion (February 5, 2022; 4:10 pm. GMA 7)
- Prima Donnas – as Aura – Starring: Jillian Ward, Althea Ablan, and Sofia Pablo (February 8 up to April 30, 2022; 2:30 pm. GMA 7)
- Magpakailanman: The Queen of Piyok ng Cebu: The Danica Areglado Story – as Jocelyn with Rita Daniela as Danica, Leandro Baldemor, and Vincent Magbanua (February 26, 2022 8:00 pm. GMA 7)
- Family Feud (Philippine game show) – guest with Sharmaine Arnaiz, Ricky Rivero, Harlene Bautista, Robert Ortega and German Moreno's family (April 26, 2022 5:30 pm. GMA 7)
- All-Out Sundays – Mother's Day Special – guest with Sheryl Cruz, Geneva Cruz, Ai-Ai delas Alas, Camille Prats and Maricris Garcia (May 8, 2022 12:00 pm. GMA 7)
- Imbestigador: Babae Sa Kakahuyan as the mother with Claire Castro as the victim and Kimson Tan as the suspect (July 9, 2022 – Saturday; 4:45 pm. GMA 7)
- Wish Ko Lang: Scammer Friend – as Aby – Alex/Frances' mother – with Adrian Lindayag as Alex/Frances, Neil Coleta, Richard Quan, and Jenzel Angeles as Jem the "Scammer Friend" (July 30, 2022; 4:10 pm. GMA 7)
- Daig Kayo ng Lola Ko: Madal-Dolls – as Au – Roxie Smith's mother – with Sanya Lopez as Bubbles, Ashley Ortega as Blondie, Hannah Precillas as Carrots, Crystal Paras as Luna, Roxie Smith as Steph, Lia Salvador as Rina, Vince Crisostomo as Zac, and Rodjun Cruz as Super Stan" (August 7, 14, & 21, 2022; 6:10 pm. GMA 7)
- Wish Ko Lang: True Love – with Ashley Ortega, Martin del Rosario, and Donna Carriaga (December 3, 2022; 4:10 pm. GMA 7)
- Imbestigador as the mother with Kirsten Gonzales as the victim and Jon Lucas as the suspect (January 28, 2023 – Saturday; 4:45 pm. GMA 7)
- Wish Ko Lang: Binalot Na Handa – as the mother-in-law with Bianca Manalo, Nico Antonio, Zymic Jaranilla, and Cai Cortez (February 11, 2023; 4:10 pm. GMA 7)
- Tadhana: Penitensya – with Thea Tolentino, Dion Ignacio, Jan Marini, Smokey Manaloto, Mosang, Euleen Castro, and Juancho Triviño (March 18 – April 1, 2023 GMA 7; 3:15 pm)
- The Seed of Love – Ludy – Eileen's sister – with Glaiza de Castro, Valerie Concepcion, and Mike Tan (2023 GMA 7)
- Sarap, 'Di Ba?: Throwback Love Team – Guest with Ramon Christopher, Sofia Pablo, and Allen Ansay – cooking "Turmeric Chicken with Sayote and Malunggay" and "Supas" – hosted by Carmina Villarroel, Cassy Legaspi, and Mavy Legaspi (April 15, 2023 GMA 7;10:45am)
- TiktoClock – Guest – with Niño Muhlach – hosted by Kim Atienza, Pokwang, and Rabiya Mateo (May 8, 2023 GMA 7)
- Imbestigador: Benguet Rape Case as the grandmother with Lyme Arana as the victim and Epy Quizon as the suspect (May 27, 2023 – Saturday; 4:45 pm. GMA 7)
- Magpakailanman: Luha Sa Likod ng Tawa: The Buboy Villar Story – as Noemi Villar with Smokey Manaloto, Ervic Vijandre, and Buboy Villar (June 3, 2023 GMA 7)
- Magpakailanman: The Kiray Celis Story: I Am Beautiful – as Meriam Celis with Kiray Celis, Smokey Manaloto, Manolo Pedrosa, Radson Flores, Anjo Damiles, and Clarence Delgado (December 2, 2023 GMA 7)
- TiktoClock – Guest – with Bruce Roeland and Lexi Gonzales – hosted by Kim Atienza, Pokwang, Jayson Gainza, Faith Da Silva, and Rabiya Mateo (January 1, 2024 GMA 7)
- Maka – Nadia Molina – with Zephanie Dimaranan (2024 GMA 7)
- Slay – Lourdes Alvarez – Sugar's mother (2025 GMA 7)
- Born to Shine – Charice Alonzo (2026 GMA 7)

== Discography ==
=== Albums ===
- Must Be Heaven (1986), Ivory Records (Triplet album)

1. "Must Be Heaven"
2. "Words Get in the Way" (Miami Sound Machine cover)
3. "Oh, My Love"
4. "An Obsession (Over You)" – solo: Sheryl Cruz (The Zummos cover)
5. "System Addict" – solo: Manilyn Reynes (Five Star cover)
6. "I Want You to Be Mine" (Mine, Mine, Mine)"
7. "The Greatest Love of All" (George Benson cover)
8. "Let's Wait Awhile" (Janet Jackson cover)
9. "Friends" – solo: Tina Paner (Amii Stewart and Mike Francis cover)
10. "Venus" (Shocking Blue cover)

- Kristina Paner (1989), DYNA Records (self-titled solo album)

1. "Di Na Bale"
2. "Umiibig Ka Pala Sa Akin"
3. "Tamis ng Unang Halik"
4. "True Friend Forever" (duet with her father Manny Paner)
5. "Biro Biro"
6. "Sikret Lang" (composed by Vehnee Saturno)
7. "Ikembot Mo, Iyugyug Mo"
8. "In Love Ako Sa 'Yo"

- Second Chance

Album appearances

- Meant to Be (Original Motion Picture Soundtrack) (2017), GMA Records – songs included are "Dear Friend" and "Kaibigan" sung by the Triplets
- Pasko Na Usab (various artists) (1981), VICOR Records / Plaka Pilipino – songs included are the Visayan Christmas songs "Maayong Pasko" and "Maglipay Kita"

=== Songs ===
- "Sana" (1981), VICOR Records / Sunshine Records (Side A: "Sana" / Side B: "Kalinisan") (45 rpm single) – with this song, Lea Salonga became her childhood rival or rather a friendly competitor when Salonga sang the song "Small Voice" that same year. Both of them were busy promoting their own singles on noontime shows and afternoon variety shows on different TV stations in their long ponytailed hairdo. Both singers/actresses met again in 1995 in the film Sana Maulit Muli. They were also pioneers in the TV show That's Entertainment. "Sana" was also revived by Jolina Magdangal on her A Wish Comes True CD under Walt Disney Records Philippines in 1996. The Tres Marias CD featuring Lolita Carbon, Cooky Chua and Bayang Barrios has their own version. It was also sung by Sarah Geronimo in Japan's Million Thanks to Remember in 2012. Another version was by Aiza Seguerra. The song was composed by folk singer Florante. The Side B song "Kalinisan" can be heard in YouTube.
- Musmos Pa Si Boss TV theme song (1983) – part of the lyrics include this phrase "...May gatas pa sa labi. Big time kahit Musmos pa si Boss..."
- "Tamis ng Unang Halik" (1989) – as well as Sharon Cuneta, the song was also recorded by Juris Fernandez which was the theme song of the teleserye Katorse. Other versions were recorded by Julie Anne San Jose and by teenage singer Ashley in 2002 under Viva Records. An instrumental version was performed by jazz saxophonist Tots Tolentino on his Color Real CD. Vice Ganda sang a spoof version of it in his TV show It's Showtime.
- "Umiibig Ka Pala sa Akin" (1989)
- "Ikembot Mo, Iyugyog Mo" (1989) – was featured from the movie "Lesson For Love" (Regal Films) – was sung by Tina, Isabel Granada, Ruffa Gutierrez, and Anna Roces in the beach scene.
