= Chuckie Dreyfus =

Filipino actor, songwriter, and television personality (born 1974)

- Born: Charles de Joya Dreyfus; August 7, 1974 (age 52); Manila, Philippines
- Occupations: Actor, host, songwriter
- Years active: 1984–present
- Spouse: Marie Aileen Regina Bayani (m. 2001)
- Children: 2
- Relatives: Migo Adecer (cousin)
- Website: www.chuckiedreyfus.ph

Charles de Joya Dreyfus (Tagalog: [ˈtʃakɪ ˈdɹeɪpus]; born August 7, 1974) is a Filipino actor, songwriter, and television personality. He received his first award as Best Child Performer 1984 at the Metro Manila Film Festival, won the FAMAS Award 1985 for Best Child Actor in the film Idol in which he played the sidekick of Philippine action star, Rudy Fernandez and in 1988 won Best Child Performer in Film Academy of the Philippines (FAP) Award for Once Upon a Time.

== Career ==
Dreyfus was 10 years old when he made his film debut in the 1984 film Idol with Rudy Fernandez. He was seen in numerous TV commercials like Colgate, KFC, Pizza Hut and in print ads as well.

Following the film's success, he joined the cast of That's Entertainment, a show geared toward Filipino youth. He was paired with Isabel Granada as a "loveteam" in a number of films. Two examples are Magic to Love (1989) and Lessons in Love (1990).

Dreyfus was part of GMA-7's Survivor Philippines: Celebrity Doubles Showdown (2011–2012). He was also in the GMA TV series Daldalita (2011–2012), which also starred Jillian Ward, Manilyn Reynes and Ogie Alcasid and was also involved in other projects such as Magdalena: Anghel sa Putikan, Mga Basang Sisiw, and more.

Dreyfus' other professional roles include being a songwriter, composer and a musical scorer. He learned midi sequencing and arranging by himself in between film and television projects and he eventually started arranging musical numbers for other artists going on road-shows and concert tours. Apart from this, Dreyfus also started arranging medleys and special song numbers for GMA Supershow and That's Entertainment. This innate musical talent was further honed when he began to concentrate on his own musical compositions which resulted to the songs "The Luv Bug", "Keep On Walking", "Let's Go Retro", "Hiling", and the carrier single "Kahit Na" of the album The Luv Bug which was released by the REtroSPECT band under Alpha Records.

Dreyfus is a member of FILSCAP and a member of the Judging & Screening Committee for the “Awit Awards” for the past 15 years. Dreyfus also composed the song "The Quiz Bee Dream" for the Quiz Bee Foundation. He was the musical director of television shows such as SCQ Reload (ABS-CBN), SCQpids (ABS-CBN), Pinoy Big Brother (Primers) (ABS-CBN), Blind Item (ABC-5, "now TV5") and Your Song (ABS-CBN).

He is the musical director of such films as Masikip sa Dibdib (Viva Films), D' Anothers (Star Cinema), Binibining K (Regal Films) and Agent X44 (Star Cinema).

Dreyfus is also the composer of the Rachelle Ann Go song "Bakit" from the album I Care, under Viva Records. "Bakit" also became the theme song of ABS-CBN's evening telenovela, Mirada de Mujer.

He also produced the theme song of the teen show SCQ Reload titled "Kilig Ako". He composed two songs ("Miss" and "Kahit Na") included on Sarah Geronimo's album Taking Flight under Viva Records, and is also the songwriter of the song "Laging Kay Ganda" from Geronimo's album MyPhone.

== Personal life ==
Dreyfus is the only child of architect Henry Dreyfus and Cynthia de Joya. Dreyfus comes from a line originating from Alsace, France. His family is from the province of Negros Occidental.

Dreyfus is married to Marie Aileen Regina Bayani. They tied the knot in 2001 at Santuario de San Jose in Greenhills. They have two children.

== Awards and nominations ==
Year	Award-giving body	Category	Work	Result
1984	Metro Manila Film Festival	Best Child Performer	Idol (1984)	Won
1985	FAMAS Award	Best Child Actor	Idol (1984)	Won
1988	FAP Award	Best Child Performer	Once Upon a Time (1987)	Won
1988	FAMAS Award	Best Child Actor	Once Upon a Time (1987)	Nominated

== Filmography ==
=== Television ===
Year	Title	Role
2025–2026	Hating Kapatid	Dr. Salvio Castillan
2025	Rainbow Rumble	Himself
2025	Sanggang-Dikit FR	Chito
2025	Regal Studio Presents: Changing Lives	Jayden
2025	SLAY: 'Til Death Do Us Part	Charlie Chua
2025	MPK: The Woman That Got Away	Nestor
2025	Mga Batang Riles	Ferdie Canlas
2024	Daig Kayo Ng Lola Ko! Presents "Mga Hero Ni Jiro"	Dudut
2023	Regal Studio Presents: My Father's Song	Jay
2022–24	Abot-Kamay na Pangarap	Dr. Raymund "Ray" Meneses
2022	Family Feud Philippines	Himself with family
2022	Panalo o Talo, It's You!	Councilor Diego Pawiz
2022	Little Princess	Fermin Garcia
2020	Bawal Judgmental Eat Bulaga	Himself
2018	Pop Talk	Actor/Blogger
2017	Pinoy M.D. Mga Doktor ng Bayan	Himself with family
2017	Pop Talk	Actor/Blogger
2017	Jackpot En Poy Eat Bulaga	Himself
2017	Pinoy M.D. Mga Doktor ng Bayan	Himself with wife Aileen
2016	Family Feud (2016 Philippine game show)	Himself
2016	Pinoy M.D. Mga Doktor ng Bayan	Himself with Family
2016	Mars	Himself
2016	Pinoy M.D. Mga Doktor ng Bayan	Himself
2016	Dear Uge	Dad
2016	Family Feud (2016 Philippine game show)	Himself
2016	Unang Hirit	Celebrity Guest For MySlim feature
2016	Cash Cab (Philippines)	Himself with Family
2015	Pop Talk	Actor/Blogger
2015	Sunday PinaSaya	Himself
2015	Once Upon a Kiss	Atty. Luis
2014	Seasons Of Love Presents: First Dance, First Love	Nestor
2014	Sunday All Stars (Paborito Segment)	Himself
2014	Day Off	Mystery Guest
2014	The Singing Bee	Himself
2014	MARS	Himself
2014	Pinoy M.D. Mga Doktor ng Bayan	Himself
2014	Pop Talk Valentine Special with wife	Himself
2014	Jojo A. All The Way! (The Medyo Late Night Show w/ Jojo A.)	Himself
2013	Celebrity Bluff	Himself
2013	Personalan	Himself
2013	Love Hotline	Himself
2013	Pepito Manaloto	
2013	Personalan	Himself
2013	Mga Basang Sisiw (TV series)	Atty. Antonio Esguerra
2013	Personalan	Himself
2013	Home Sweet Home	Haring Kong King
2013	Jeepney Jackpot: Pera o Para!	Himself
2013	Personalan	Himself
2012	Personalan	Himself
2012	Weekend Getaway	Himself with wife
2012	MARS	Himself
2012	Personalan	Himself
2012	Magdalena: Anghel sa Putikan	Ben
2012	Pop Talk	Himself
2012	Party Pilipinas	Himself
2012	Moments	Himself with family
2012	Fashbook	Himself
2011	Daldalita	Ashton
2011	Survivor Philippines: Celebrity Doubles Showdown	Castaway
2011	Tunay Na Buhay	Himself
2006	K, the P1,000,000 Videoke Contest	—
1991–96	Maalaala Mo Kaya	Various Roles
1987–90	Hapi House!	Jon Jon
1986–96	That's Entertainment	Himself / Wednesday Group Member
1984–92	Lovingly Yours, Helen	—
1984–92	Coney Reyes on Camera	—

=== Film ===
Year	Title	Role
1984	Idol	Obet
1985	I Have Three Hands	Junior
1985	The Crazy Professor	
1986	Mga Kwento ni Lola Basyang	Querubin
1986	When I Fall in Love	
1986	Horsey-Horsey, Tigidig-Tigidig	Tommy's brother
1986	Batang Quiapo	Dodong
1987	Family Tree	John
1987	Once Upon a Time	Lally
1987	1 + 1 = 12 (+ 1): One Plus One Equals Twelve (Cheaper by the Dozen)	
1988	Kambal Tuko	Chuckie
1988	Lost Command	
1988	Penoy ... Balut	
1988	Tiyanak	Aries
1989	Magic to Love	Chuckie
1989	Isang Araw Walang Diyos	Buddy
1989	Huwag Kang Hahalik sa Diablo	Fritz
1990	Papa's Girl	
1990	Tora Tora, Bang Bang Bang	Junior
1990	Lessons in Love	
1992	Tag-araw, Tag-ulan	Bunso
1992	Pretty Boy	
1992	Pangako sa 'Yo	
1993	Row 4: Baliktorians	Roberto Dela Cruz
1993	Ang Boyfriend Kong Gamol	Bong
1996	Cedie	Dick
2005	Sarong Banggi	Himself
2011	Tween Academy: Class of 2012	Father of Ashley

== Music ==
=== As songwriter ===
- I Care album by Rachelle Ann Go
  - "Bakit" (2006)
- Taking Flight - album by Sarah Geronimo
  - "Kahit Na" (2007)
  - "Miss" (2007)

=== Music scorer ===
- Agent X44 (2007)
- Binibining K (2006)
- D' Anothers (2005)
- Masikip sa Dibdib (2004)

== See also ==
- Migo Adecer
