= 1986 FAMAS Awards =

34th edition of Filipino movie awards

34th FAMAS Awards
- Date: 1986
- Site: Philippines
- Hosted by: Coney Reyes and Tito Sotto

Highlights
- Best Picture: Paradise Inn ~ Amazaldy Films
- Most awards: Paradise Inn ~ Amazaldy Films (6 wins)

The 34th Filipino Academy of Movie Arts and Sciences Awards Night was held in 1986 in the Philippines. The event recognizes outstanding achievements in the Filipino movie industry for the prior year.

Paradise Inn won the most awards including the FAMAS Award for Best Picture and best director for Celso Ad Castillo. Eddie Romero and George Canseco were elevated to the Hall of Fame for winning more than five times in their respective category.

== Awards ==
=== Major Awards ===
Winners are listed first and highlighted with boldface.

Best Picture	Best Director
**Paradise Inn — Amazaldy Films**; Bakit Manipis ang Ulap — Essex Films; Bayan ko: Kapit sa patalim — Malaya Films and Stephan Films; Miguelito: Batang rebelde — D'Wonder Films; Partida — FPJ Productions	**Celso Ad Castillo — Paradise Inn**; Danny L. Zialcita — Bakit Manipis ang Ulap; Lino Brocka — Bayan Ko: Kapit sa Patalim; Lino Brocka — Miguelito: Batang Rebelde; Ben Yalung — Partida
Best Actor	Best Actress
**Phillip Salvador — Bayan ko: Kapit sa patalim**; Christopher de Leon — God Save Me; Ace Vergel — Bomba Arienda; Eddie Garcia — Miguelito: Batang Rebelde; Anthony Alonzo — Moises Padilla Story: The Missing Chapter; Fernando Poe Jr. — Partida; Dindo Fernando — Muling Buksan ang Puso	**Vivian Velez — Paradise Inn**; Gina Alajar — Ano ang Kulay ng Mukha ng Diyos; Nora Aunor — I can't Stop Loving You; Vilma Santos — Muling Buksan ang Puso; Nida Blanca — Miguelito: Batang Rebelde; Chanda Romero — Bakit Manipis ang Ulap; Armida Siguion-Reyna — Paradise Inn
Best Supporting Actor	Best Supporting Actress
**Dante Rivero — Sa Dibdib ng Sierra Madre**; Edu Manzano — Ano ang Kulay ng Mukha ng Diyos; Tommy Abuel — God Save Me; Aga Muhlach — Miguelito: Batang Rebelde; Lito Anzures — Paradise Inn; Miguel Rodriguez — Partida; George Estregan — Mga Paru-parung Bukid	**Dina Bonnevie — Tinik sa Dibdib**; Caridad Sanchez — Ano ang Kulay ng Mukha ng Diyos; Cherie Gil — God Save Me; Amy Austria — Hinugot sa Langit; Angie Ferro — Isla; Charito Solis — Moises Padilla Story: The Missing Chapter; Liza Lorena — Pahiram ng Ligaya
Best Child Actor	Best Child Actress
**Jaypee de Guzman — Tinik sa Dibdib**	Bamba — Momoooo
Best in Screenplay	Best Story
**Oscar Miranda — Paradise Inn**	**Jose Dalisay — Miguelito: Batang Rebelde**
Best Sound	Best Musical Score
**Rolly Ruta — Paradise Inn**	**Willy Cruz — Bituing Walang Ningning**
Best Cinematography	Best Editing
**Romy Vitug — Paradise Inn**	**Augusto Salvador — Partida**
Best Theme Song	Production Design
**Willy Cruz — Bituing Walang Ningning**	**Don Escudero — Virgin Forest**
Best Visual Effects	
**Ramjie — Zuma**	—

=== Special Awardee ===
- **Hall of Fame Awardee**
  - **Eddie Romero - Screenplay**
    - 1985 - Ang Padrino
    - 1981 - Aguila
    - 1980 - Durugin Si Totoy Bato
    - 1967 - The Passionate Strangers
    - 1953- Buhay Alamang

- **Bida Sa Takilya**
  - **Sharon Cuneta**

- **Hall of Fame Awardee**
  - **George Canseco - Theme Song**
    - 1985 - Dapat Ka Bang Mahalin?
    - 1984 - Paano Ba Ang Mangarap?
    - 1983 - Gaano Kadalas Ang Minsan?
    - 1981 - Langis At Tubig
    - 1980 - Huwag, Bayaw

- **Best Dressed Movie Star (Bida Ng Gabi)**
  - **Lorna Tolentino**
