= Jaypee de Guzman =

Filipino actor

- Born: Jaypee James de Guzman; April 20, 1978 (age 48); Quezon City, Philippines
- Occupations: Actor, director, multimedia editor
- Years active: 1983–2025
- Spouse: PY Nakar-de Guzman (m. 2007)

Jaypee James de Guzman (born April 20, 1978) is a multi-awarded actor in the Philippines. He was a child star of the '80s along with Bamba, Lady Lee, RR Herrera, Chuckie Dreyfus, Glaiza Herradura, Rose Ann Gonzales, Matet de Leon and Aiza Seguerra, among others. He received his first award as the Best Child Performer in the Metro Manila Film Festival movie Teng Teng De Sarapen (1983) starring Dolphy and Alma Moreno.

== Career ==
At the age of four, de Guzman made his feature film debut in Maryo J. de los Reyes' Saan Darating ang Umaga? (1983), a family drama in which he portrayed the adopted son of Nida Blanca and Nestor de Villa and a target of his sister Maricel Soriano. He also appeared in other notable films such as Teng Teng de Serapen (1983), Mga Batang Yagit (1984), Dear Mama (1984), Kapag Puso’y Sinugatan (1984), and Tinik sa Dibdib (1985), where he played the role of a mentally-challenged child. Throughout his acting career, de Guzman received two nominations and won twice for Best Child Actor (Saan Darating ang Umaga? and Tinik sa Dibdib) at the FAMAS Awards. Additionally, he was named the Best Child Performer for the comedy film Teng Teng de Sarapen at the Metro Manila Film Festival in 1983. He appeared in a TV series by GMA Network named Yagit, where he worked with Amy Austria and Ernie Garcia.

In 1989, de Guzman joined the youth-oriented program That's Entertainment and became a regular member ever since, before the show ended seven years later. There were no more offers of acting projects for de Guzman during his stay on the variety show. He guested in one of the episodes of Homeboy with other former child stars RR Herrera and Chuckie Dreyfus.

In 2014, de Guzman returned from his nearly two-decade showbiz absence to star in the GMA evening soap series My BFF, portraying the best friend and sidekick of Janno Gibbs' character. In the same year, GMA coincidentally produced and broadcast a revival of classic telenovela that he appeared in.

== Personal life ==
De Guzman graduated Communication Arts from De La Salle University in 2000. A family man, de Guzman is married to former television host PY Nakar since 2007 and has three boys, namely Mateo, Lucas, and Zach.

De Guzman worked as an editor at GMA 7, directing several music videos and handling post-production services for the network's defunct sister channel Q.

A devout and charismatic Catholic, de Guzman serves as the head of the music and audiovisual arm and the national coordinator for the youth ministry at Elim Communities in New Manila, Quezon City. Apart from his regular services in the Church, de Guzman also manages the video department at Springs Foundation, Inc., a nonprofit organization dedicated to the proclamation of Gospel through integral evangelization. Because cycling is one of his favorite hobbies, de Guzman owns the Trinity Cycle Shop.

== Filmography ==
=== Film ===
Year	Title	Role
1983	Saan Darating ang Umaga?	Joel Rodrigo
1983	Teng Teng de Sarapen	Sonny
1984	Sa Ngalan ng Anak	
1984	Dear Mama	Dennis
1984	Give Me Five!	Itoy
1984	Mga Ibong Pipit	
1984	Mga Batang Yagit	Ding
1984	Nang Maghalo ang Balat sa Tinalupan	Chris
1985	Kapag Puso'y Sinugatan	
1985	Isang Platitong Mani	
1985	Tinik sa Dibdib	Boyito
1986	Huwag Mo Kaming Isumpa	Boboy
1986	Mga Anghel ng Diyos	
1986	Pepe Saclao: Public Enemy No. 1	Junior Montes
1986	Tu-yay and His Magic Payong	Jaypee
1987	1 + 1 = 12 (+ 1): One Plus One Equals Twelve (Cheaper by the Dozen)	
1988	Fly Me to the Moon	I-donox

=== Television ===
Year	Title	Role
1983	Blu: Bernardo, Lorenzo, Ulysses	
1983–1985	Yagit	Ding
1989–1996	That's Entertainment	Himself
2006	Homeboy	Himself
2006	K, the P1,000,000 Videoke Challenge	Himself
2012	Sharon: Kasama Mo, Kapatid	Himself
2014	My BFF	Tolits
2014	The Singing Bee	Himself
2016	Family Feud	Himself
2017	Jackpot en Poy – Eat Bulaga	Himself
2019	Bawal Kumurap, Nakamamatay ng Swerte! – Eat Bulaga	Himself
2020	Bawal Judgmental – Eat Bulaga	Himself
2023	FPJ's Batang Quiapo	Police Colonel Magno Cudillo
2025	Rainbow Rumble	Himself

== Accolades ==
Year	Awards	Category	Recipient	Result
1983	Metro Manila Film Festival	Best Child Performer	Teng Teng de Sarapen	Won
1984	FAMAS Awards	Best Child Actor	Saan Darating Ang Umaga?	Won
1985	FAMAS Awards	Best Child Actor	Nang Maghalo Ang Balat Sa Tinalupan	Nominated
1986	FAMAS Awards	Best Child Actor	Tinik Sa Dibdib	Won
1986	FAP Award	Best Child Performer	Tinik Sa Dibdib	Won
1987	FAMAS Awards	Best Child Actor	Huwag Mo Kaming Isumpa!	Nominated
