= Daldalita =

Philippine television drama series

- Title card
- Genre: Fantasy drama
- Created by: Denoy Navarro Punio
- Directed by: Don Michael Perez
- Starring: Jillian Ward
- Theme music composer: Ogie Alcasid
- Opening theme: "Daldalita" by Ogie Alcasid and Jillian Ward
- Ending theme: "Someone's Waiting for You" by Ogie Alcasid
- Country of origin: Philippines
- Original language: Tagalog
- No. of episodes: 80

Production
- Executive producer: Leilani Feliciano Sandoval
- Camera setup: Multiple-camera setup
- Running time: 18–29 minutes
- Production company: GMA Entertainment TV

Original release
- Network: GMA Network
- Release: October 17, 2011 – February 3, 2012

Daldalita is a Philippine television drama fantasy musical series broadcast by GMA Network. Directed by Don Michael Perez, it stars Jillian Ward in the title role. It premiered on October 17, 2011, on the network's Telebabad line up. The series concluded on February 3, 2012, with a total of 80 episodes.

The series is streaming online on YouTube.

== Cast and characters ==
Cast

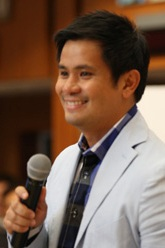
Ogie Alcasid

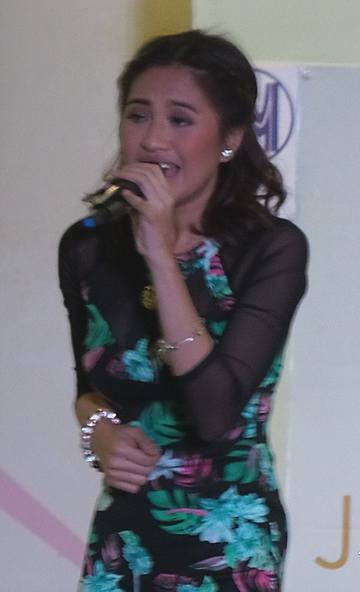
Julie Anne San Jose

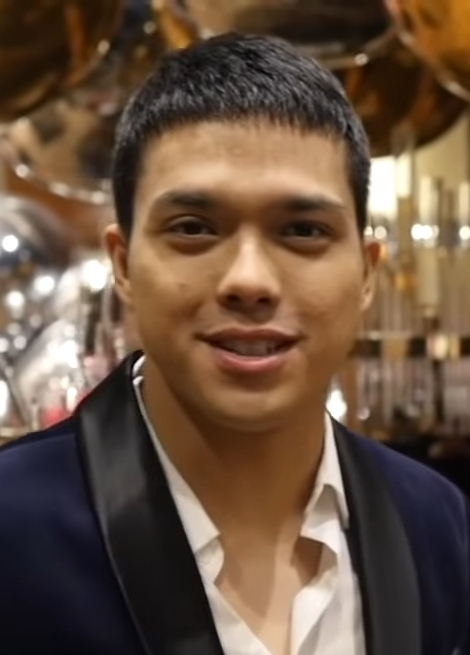
Elmo Magalona

Lead cast

- Jillian Ward as Daldalita / Lolita Matias

Supporting cast

- Ogie Alcasid as Mateo Matias
- Manilyn Reynes as Katrina de Leon
- Rufa Mae Quinto as Cherry
- Julie Anne San Jose as Marga de Leon
- Elmo Magalona as Gino Delgado
- Isabel Oli as May
- Marc Abaya as Sam

Recurring cast

- Luigi Revilla as Dado
- Timmy Cruz as Lupe
- Spanky Manikan as Manny Manuel
- Arnold Reyes as Arthur
- Jinky Oda as Tisay
- Joey Paras as Chi-Chi
- Eunice Lagusad as Tessa

Voice cast

- Candy Pangilinan as Daisy
- Pekto as Kirat
- Wally Bayola as Bobby

Guest cast

- Donna Cruz as Carmela de Leon-Matias
- Isabel Granada as Demi
- Chuckie Dreyfus as Ashton
- Baby O'Brien as Barbara
- MM Magno as Johann
- Milkcah Wynne Nacion as Becky
- Sasha Baldoza
- Sean Samonte as Dwayne
- Angel Satsumi
- Raymart Santiago as Tarzan

== Casting ==
Actress Gelli de Belen was initially hired for the role of Katrina de Leon. De Belen later left the series. Actress Manilyn Reynes served as her replacement.

== Ratings ==
According to AGB Nielsen Philippines' Mega Manila household television ratings, the pilot episode of Daldalita earned a 19.3% rating. The final episode scored a 17% rating.
