= Magdalena: Anghel sa Putikan =

Philippine television drama series

- Title card
- Genre: Drama
- Based on: Kukulayan Ko ang Langit
- Developed by: R.J. Nuevas; Agnes Gagelonia-Uligan
- Written by: Michiko Yamamoto; Maribel Ilag
- Directed by: Gina Alajar
- Creative director: Jun Lana
- Starring: Bela Padilla
- Theme music composer: Ogie Alcasid
- Opening theme: "Ikaw ang Pag-ibig Ko" by Kyla
- Country of origin: Philippines
- Original language: Tagalog
- No. of episodes: 75

Production
- Executive producer: Lani Feliciano Sandoval
- Production locations: Tanay, Rizal, Philippines; Manila, Philippines
- Cinematography: Rhino Vidanes
- Camera setup: Multiple-camera setup
- Running time: 18–31 minutes
- Production company: GMA Entertainment TV

Original release
- Network: GMA Network
- Release: October 8, 2012 – January 18, 2013

Magdalena: Anghel sa Putikan (transl. Magdalena: angel in mud) is a Philippine television drama series broadcast by GMA Network. The series is based on Nuevas' comic book series, Kukulayan Ko ang Langit. Directed by Gina Alajar, it stars Bela Padilla in the title role. It premiered on October 8, 2012 on the network's Afternoon Prime line up. The series concluded on January 18, 2013, with a total of 75 episodes.

The series is streaming online on YouTube.

== Cast and characters ==
Cast

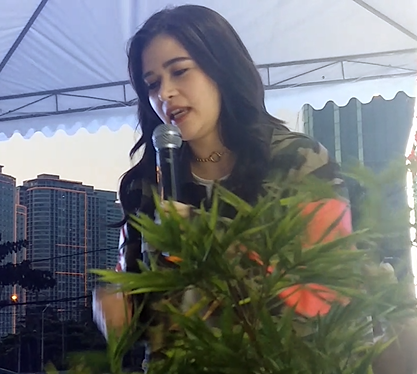
Bela Padilla

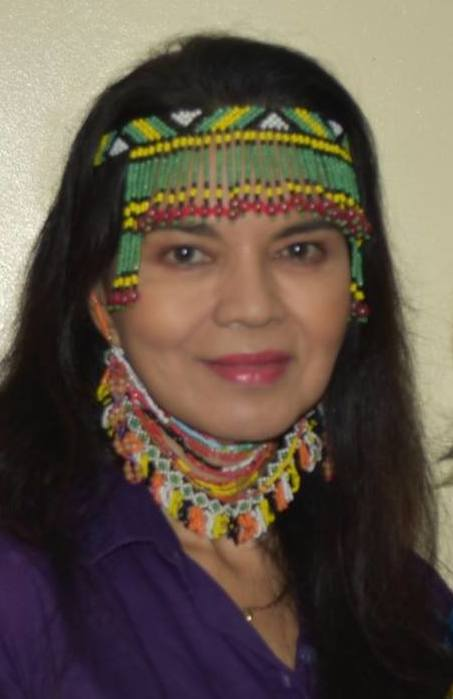
Maria Isabel Lopez

Lead cast

- Bela Padilla as Magdalena "Lena" Fuentebella-Soriano / Angela Natividad

A poor young lady blessed with stunning beauty and a pure heart. A deeply religious lass whose twin aspirations are to alleviate the life of her loved ones and start her own family life with her one great love, Abel. But her humble dreams are shattered and her fate changes drastically with the intrusion of an evil man that will lead her to suffer into much miserable and complicated world.

Supporting cast

- Dion Ignacio as Abel Soriano
- Ryan Eigenmann as Baron Villa de Asis
- Pauleen Luna as Carol Fuentebella

The mean-spirited and social climber stepsister of Lena. Cunning and never running out of schemes, Carol is the type of person who will do anything to acquire everything she wants, even if it means hurting the people around her in the process.

- Pancho Magno as Jet Collado

An aspiring model whose good looks and charismatic nature made him a certified "chick magnet". He is a knight-in-shining-armor who will help Lena to get back on her feet and will eventually fall in love with her.

- Irma Adlawan as Ludivina "Luding" Fuentebella
- Allan Paule as Rodolpo "Dolpo" Fuentebella
- Lexi Fernandez as Fatima "Timay" Natividad
- Sharmaine Arnaiz as Charito "Chato" Natividad / Amparo Reyes
- Maria Isabel Lopez as Julia "Huling" Hermodo
- Deborah Sun as Cecilia "Selya" Soriano
- Via Antonio as Siony
- Bodie Cruz as Deo
- Mercedes Cabral as Kim

Working for her pimp boss, Baron [with whom she's in love] as an escort girl. She envies Lena, as the spotlight is turned for the latter, but the two will eventually become allies.

- Chariz Solomon as Roxy

The assistant of Baron in the prostitution den, who eventually become friends with Lena.

Guest cast

- Vivo Ouano as Obet
- Prince Stefan as Ice Rivero
- Alvin Aragon as Raki
- Mayton Eugenio as Dessa
- Chuckie Dreyfus as Ben
- Nathalie Hart as Chloe
- Pinky Amador as Z

== Development ==
The show began developing early 2012 as part of network's offering for the last quarter of the year. Nuevas said that the network's executives want him to create a more realistic, more mature drama. Then he thought of his old komiks creation, Kukulayan Ko Ang Langit, which is about a naive provincial girl forced by circumstances to become an escort girl. Nuevas doesn't look at this story as merely sexy drama but more of a display of how a woman will face life's challenging situations and fight for her right. This series is somewhat an advocacy against human trafficking and promotion of women empowerment. "Admit it or not, this is what real life is all about. It really happens. Compared to some drama series, this one is shockingly realistic," he added.

=== Casting ===
Bela Padilla challenged her ability to act as natural as she can be. Most of the scenes in the show's pilot week will see her crying buckets. "I am challenged, starting with the first two weeks (of our taping). My character is too weak and so naive. I'm like that in real life because I trust everyone too much. Sometimes when I cry, it feels like it hits me," Padilla says.

The producer hired actress and television director, Gina Alajar to handle the series. Padilla feels so lucky that her director in the series is Alajar. "She really guides me and challenges me to give my best in every scene," she says. "It feels like, she's giving me a personal acting workshop to make sure that my performance will be superb," she added. Prior to this project, Alajar and Padilla have worked as co-stars in hit afternoon drama, Hiram na Puso.

On the other hand, series' director, Alajar is pleased to work with her son Ryan Eigenmann who played the main antagonist, Baron. "This is not the first time I am directing my son. I've directed him in Kirara, Ano Ang Kulay ng Pag-ibig? before. He was still a newbie in acting then. We also worked in an Eat Bulaga drama special for Holy Week," she recalled.

Pauleen Luna portrayed the series' main female antagonist, Carol. Luna admits she wants to rest from playing villain roles but she accepted doing the show as it'll give her the chance to work with Alajar as director. "I know I'll learn a lot from her," she says. Also, Luna stated that her role here is quite different from all her anti-hero roles she done in her past television series."I usually played as wealthy contravida in my previous series. Here, I played a poor and very ambitious villain," she added.

== Ratings ==
According to AGB Nielsen Philippines' Mega Manila household television ratings, the pilot episode of Magdalena earned a 15.1% rating. The final episode scored an 18.1% rating.
