= Heartbeat (Manilyn Reynes album) =

Studio album by Manilyn Reynes
- Released: 1989
- Genre: Pop, rock, jazz
- Length: 29:58
- Language: Tagalog, English
- Label: OctoArts International
- Producer: Bob Guzman (producer)

Manilyn Reynes chronology
| Manilyn (1988) | Heartbeat (1989) | Gugma (1990) |

Singles from Heartbeat
- 1. "Feel na feel" Released: March 1989; 2. "Ikaw Pa Rin" Released: 1990

Heartbeat is the fifth album by Filipino singer-actress Manilyn Reynes. Her album was released and distributed by OctoArts International Inc. in 1989. It was released on cassette and vinyl. The album was certified gold by PARI in the Philippines.

== Background ==
In 1999, Reynes released her fifth album, Heartbeat under OctoArts International Inc. . The EP contains eight tracks.

=== Singles ===
The first single from the album, "Feel na feel", written by Paul Aaron, was released on March 2, 1989. The song was included on the soundtrack to the film, Feel na feel, in 1990. The following year, a second single from the album, "Ikaw Pa Rin", written by Marizen Yaneza, was released.

== Track listing ==
| No. | Title | Writer(s) | Length |
|---|---|---|---|
| 1. | "Feel na feel" | Aaron Paul | 3:34 |
| 2. | "Maybe This Time" | Aaron Paul | 4:26 |
| 3. | "Mixed Emotions" | Andrei Dionisio | 2:46 |
| 4. | "Ikaw Pa Rin" | Marizen Yaneza | 4:23 |
| 5. | "Maasahan Mo" | Ben Escasa; Boyet Palisoc | 3:00 |
| 6. | "Isang Pag-ibig" | Marizen Yaneza | 3:16 |
| 7. | "Show Me" | Aaron Paul | 4:15 |
| 8. | "If We Hold On Together" | James Homer; Will Jennings | 4:07 |

== Personnel ==
Production

- Arranged by Jimmy Antiporda, Andrei Dionisio, Homer Flores, Gerry Paraiso, Dante Trinidad
- Designed by Danny Lazaro
- Produced by Bob Guzman
- Executive producer – Orlando R. Ilacad
- Guitar – Jose Jimenez
- Saxophone – Eddie Katindig

== Release history ==
| Region | Release date | Label | Edition | Catalogue |
|---|---|---|---|---|
| Philippines | 1989 | OctoArts International | Standard (LP and Cassette) | ORILP-1012 |

== Certifications ==
| Region | Certification | Certified units/sales |
|---|---|---|
| Philippines (PARI) | Gold | 20,000^{*} |
^{*} Sales figures based on certification alone.
