= 1985 FAMAS Awards =

33rd edition of Filipino movie awards

33rd FAMAS Awards
- Date: 1985
- Site: Araneta Coliseum

Highlights
- Best Picture: Ang Padrino ~ FPJ Productions
- Most awards: Ang Padrino ~ FPJ Productions (3 wins)

The 33rd Filipino Academy of Movie Arts and Sciences Awards Night was held in 1985 at the Araneta Coliseum in the Philippines. The event recognized outstanding achievements of the different films for the year 1984.

'Ang Padrino won the most awards including the FAMAS Award for Best Picture and best director for Fernando Poe Jr. This is also Nora Aunor's 10th straight nominations and 3rd win as best actress for the film Bulaklak sa City Jail. Aunor shared the recognition with Sharon Cuneta for her movie "Dapat ka bang Mahalin", this is only the second time in FAMAS history. FAMAS also gave out the first Best Visual Effects award which was won by "Ang Panday" and Best Sound Effects

== Awards ==
=== Major Awards ===
Winners are listed first and highlighted with boldface.

Best Picture	Best Director
**Ang Padrino — FPJ Productions**; Pasukuin si Waway — Vanguard Films; Bulaklak ng City Jail — Cherubin Films; Misteryo sa Tuwa — Experimental Cinema of the Philippines; Pieta: Ikalawang Aklat — Amazaldy Film Productions; Sister Stella L. — Regal Films; Working Girls — VIVA Films; Nang Masugatan ang Gabi — HPS Production	**Fernando Poe Jr. — Ang Padrino**; Mario O'Hara — Bulaklak sa City Jail; Manuel Fyke Cinco — Pasukuin si Waway; Danny L. Zialcita — Nang Masugatan ang Gabi; Carlo J. Caparas — Pieta: Ikalawang Aklat; Mike De Leon — Sister Stella L.; Ishmael Bernal — Working Girls
Best Actor	Best Actress
**Rudy Fernandez — Pasukuin si Waway**; Philip Salvador — Baby Tsina; Ace Vergel — Basag ang Pula; Chiquito — Lovingly Yours, Helen (The Movie); Ramon Revilla Jr. — Pieta: Ikalawang Aklat; Fernando Poe Jr. — Sigaw ng Katarungan	**Nora Aunor — Bulaklak sa City Jail**; **Sharon Cuneta — Dapat Ka Bang Mahalin**; Vilma Santos — Sister Stella L.; Maricel Soriano — Kaya kong Abutin ang Langit; Coney Reyes — Ang Padrino; Stella Strada — Puri; Vivian Velez — Pieta: Ikalawang Aklat
Best Supporting Actor	Best Supporting Actress
**Celso Ad Castillo — Sampung Ahas ni Eva**; **Tony Santos — Sister Stella L.**; Dindo Fernando — Baby Tsina; Tommy Abuel — Kriminal; Zandro Zamora — Ang Padrino; Paquito Diaz — Ang Panday IV; George Estregan — Sa Bulaklak ng Apoy	**Perla Bautista — Bulaklak sa City Jail**; Caridad Sanchez — Baby Tsina; Bella Flores — Mga Batang Yagit'; Gina Pareño — Bukas Luluhod ang mga Tala; Gloria Romero — Condemned; Gina Alajar — Kaya kong Abutin ang Langit; Laurice Guillen — Sister Stella L.
Best Child Actor	Best Child Actress
**Chuckie Dreyfus — Idol**; Tomtom — Mga batang Yagit; Jaypee de Guzman — Nang Maghalo ang Balat sa Tinalupan; Christopher Paloma — Ang Panday IV; Romnick Sarmienta — Pieta" Ikalawang Aklat; Eric Francisco — Pusakal; Joko Diaz — Sigaw ng Katarungan	**Rose Ann Gonzales — Kriminal**; Jocelyn De la Cruz — Mga Batang Yagit; Janet Elisa Giron — Bukas Luluhod ang mga Tala; Manilyn Reynes — Dear Mama; Jennifer Sevilla — Kapitan Inggo; Ajay Marquez — Kaya kong Abutin ang Langit; Sheryl Cruz — Lovingly Yours, Helen (The Movie)
Best in Screenplay	Best Story
**Fernando Poe Jr. (as Ronwaldo Reyes), Eddie Romero, Fred Navarro — Ang Padrino**; Lualhati Bautista — Bulaklak sa City Jail	**Carlo J. Caparas — Somewhere**; Nerissa Cabral — Bukas Luluhod ang mga Tala
Best Sound	Best Musical Score
**Rolly Ruta — Bukas Luluhod ang mga Tala**	**Willy Cruz — Bukas Luluhod ang mga Tala**
Best Cinematography	Best Editing
**Romy Vitug — Kung Mahawi Man Ang Ulap**	**Jess Navarro — Sister Stella L.**
Best Theme Song	Production Design
**George Canseco — Dapat Ka Bang Mahalin**	**Steve Paolo — Alapaap**
Best Visual Effects	Best Sound Effects
**Ramjie — Ang Panday IV**	**Demet Velasquez — Bagets**

=== Special Awardee ===
- **Lou Salvador Sr. Memorial Award**
  - **Bert "Tawa" Marcelo**
- **Dr. Jose Perez Memorial Award**
  - **Billy Balbastro**
- **Lifetime Achievement Award**
  - **Levi Celerio**
- **Hall of Fame Awardee**
  - **Charito Solis - Actress**
    - 1984 - Don't Cry For Me Papa
    - 1969 - Igorota
    - 1964 - Angustia
    - 1961 - Emily
    - 1960 - Kundiman Ng Lahi
- **Best Dressed Movie Star (Bida Ng Gabi)**
  - **Carmi Martin**
