= Manilyn (album) =

Studio album by Manilyn Reynes
- Released: 1988
- Genre: Electronic, Pop, OPM
- Language: Tagalog, English
- Label: OctoArts International
- Producer: Bob Guzman (producer); Choy Lopez (assistant producer); Jong Azures (assistant producer)

Manilyn Reynes chronology
Triplets (1986)	Manilyn (1988)	Heartbeat (1989)

Singles from Manilyn
- 1. "Sayang na Sayang" Released: 1988

Manilyn is a self-titled fourth album by Filipino singer-actress Manilyn Reynes, released in 1988 under OctoArts International. It was released on cassette and vinyl. The album was certified double platinum by PARI in the Philippines.

== Background ==
In 1988, Reynes signed with OctoArts International and released the self-titled album, Manilyn. The EP album contained 7 tracks.

=== Single ===
Reynes released the single, "Sayang na Sayang" in 1988. The song became a viral hit song and topped the Philippines Billboard charts, also earning a platinum award.

In 2021 interview, Reynes confirmed that her single, "Sayang na Sayang", was written for actor Janno Gibbs, whom their team up in movies was cut short in 1989 when Gibbs began dating actress Bing Loyzaga. After three decades, Reynes and Gibbs remains good friends.

== Track listing ==
No.	Title	Writer(s)	Length
1.	"Sayang na Sayang"	Ben Escasa; Choy Lopez	3:26
2.	"Somewhere Along the Way"	Ivy Gutierrrez; John De Leon	4:27
3.	"Asahan Mo"	Jennifer Rosete; Jong Azores	4:59
4.	"Sad Song"	Norman Caraan	3:35
5.	"Ingat Ka, Mahal Kita"	Liza Dale Salang	3:35
6.	"Don't You Know"	Norman Caraan	3:41
7.	"Baby, Baby"	John Forte; Sam Dominges	4:00
8.	"I'll Always love you"	Jimmy George	4:31

== Personnel ==
Production

- Arrangements by Homer Flores, Sunny Ilacad, Gerry Parais, Dante Trinidad
- Cover by Guillermo dela Cruz
- Directors of photography – Danny Lazaro and Jenny C. Zagala
- Engineered by Lito Balagtas, Joseph Roxas, Nonie Tabios
- Produced by Bob Guzman
- Assistant producers – Jong Azores, Choy Lopez
- Recorded at Cinema Audio, Inc. and Greenhills Sounds Production Inc.

== Release history ==
Region	Release date	Label	Edition	Catalogue
Philippines	1988	OctoArts International	Standard (LP and Cassette)	ORIHG-951

== Certifications ==
Region	Certification	Certified units/sales
Philippines (PARI)	2× Platinum	80,000^{*}
^{*} Sales figures based on certification alone.
