= That's Entertainment (Philippine TV program) =

Philippine television variety show

- Title card
- Genre: Variety show
- Directed by: Buddy Daliwan
- Presented by: German Moreno; Ike Lozada
- Country of origin: Philippines
- Original language: Tagalog
- No. of episodes: 3,200

Production
- Executive producer: Lenny C. Parto
- Production locations: GMA Building, Quezon City, Philippines (1986–87); GMA Broadway Centrum, Quezon City, Philippines (1987–96)
- Camera setup: Multiple-camera setup
- Running time: 60 minutes
- Production company: GMA Productions Inc.

Original release
- Network: GMA Network
- Release: January 6, 1986 – May 3, 1996

That's Entertainment is a Philippine television variety show broadcast by GMA Network. Originally hosted by German Moreno and Ike Lozada, it premiered on January 6, 1986. The show concluded on May 3, 1996, with a total of 3,200 episodes.

== Overview ==
The show was created by German Moreno who initially wanted teenaged celebrity siblings to star in the show and name it as Brothers and Sisters. After watching the American film That's Entertainment!, Moreno decided to change the title of the show. Premiering on January 6, 1986 on GMA Network, the show featured sixteen teenagers (divided into 4 from Monday to Thursday and gathered all together on Friday). The show later joined the network's Saturday afternoon line up. The show first aired from the GMA building in EDSA and eventually moved to GMA Broadway Centrum in 1987 to accommodate a wider studio audience.

The cast was separated into five groups; Monday, Tuesday, Wednesday, Thursday and Friday. During the Saturday broadcast, all five groups performed together. The show also featured dance groups such as the Manoeuvres, Streetboys, Abztract Dancers, Kids at Work and Universal Motion Dancers.

The final episode, "That's The Reunion" was aired as a 2-hour primetime television special on May 3, 1996, which featured former cast members of the show.

== Cast ==
Cast

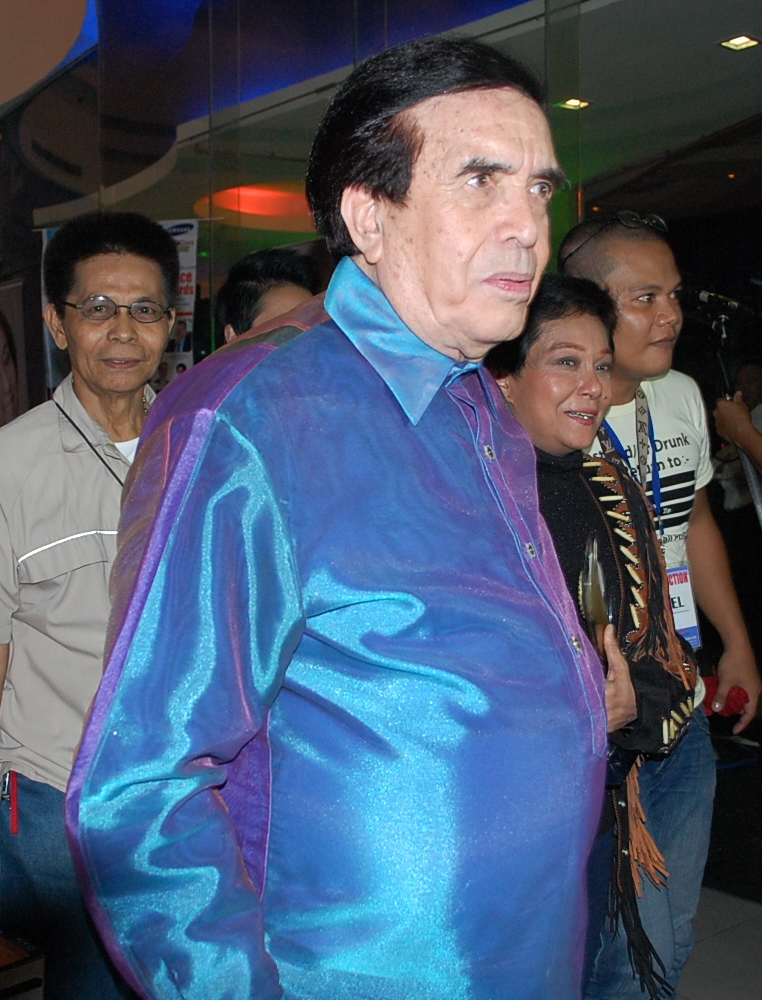
German Moreno

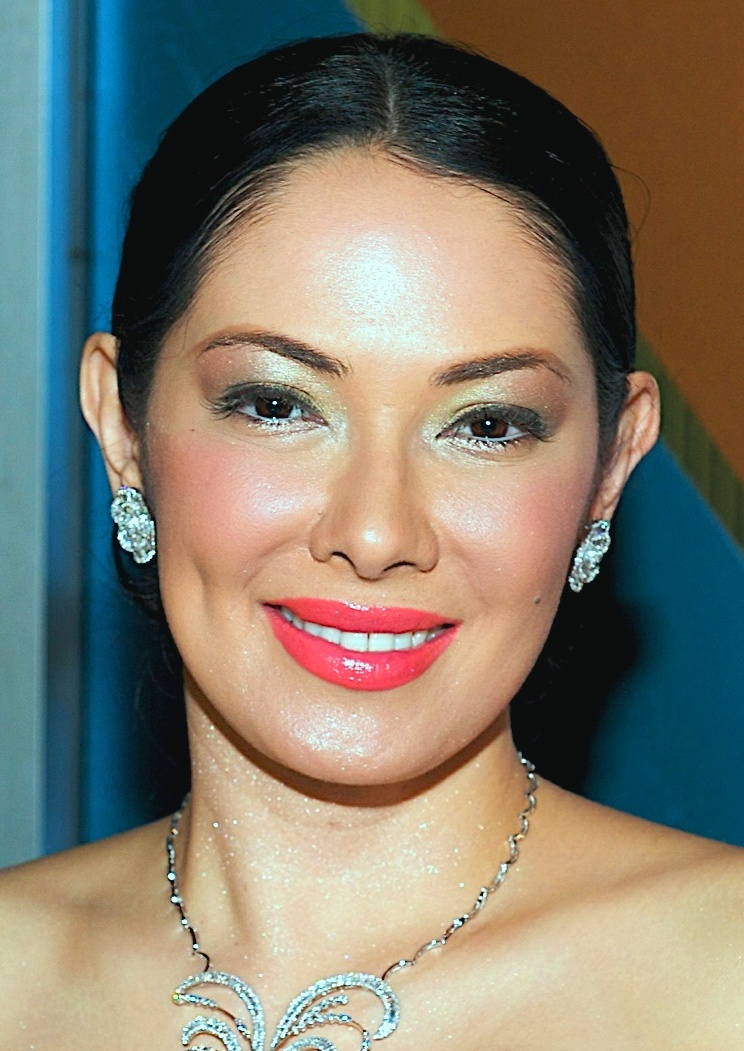
Ruffa Gutierrez

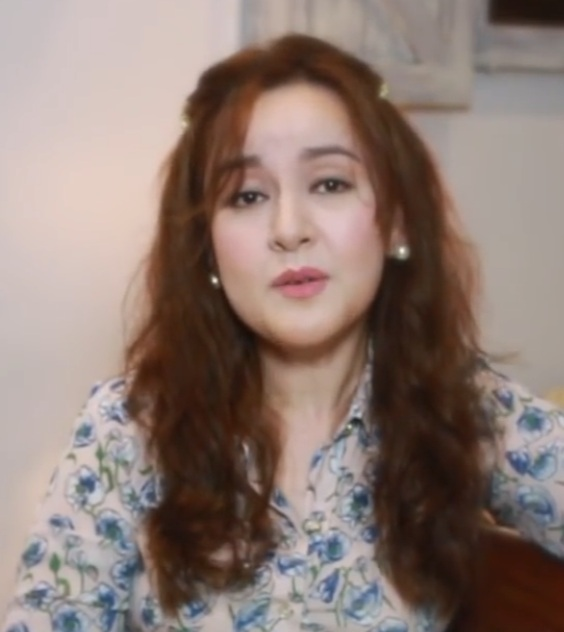
Lilet

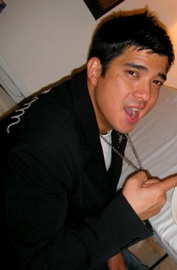
Francis Magalona

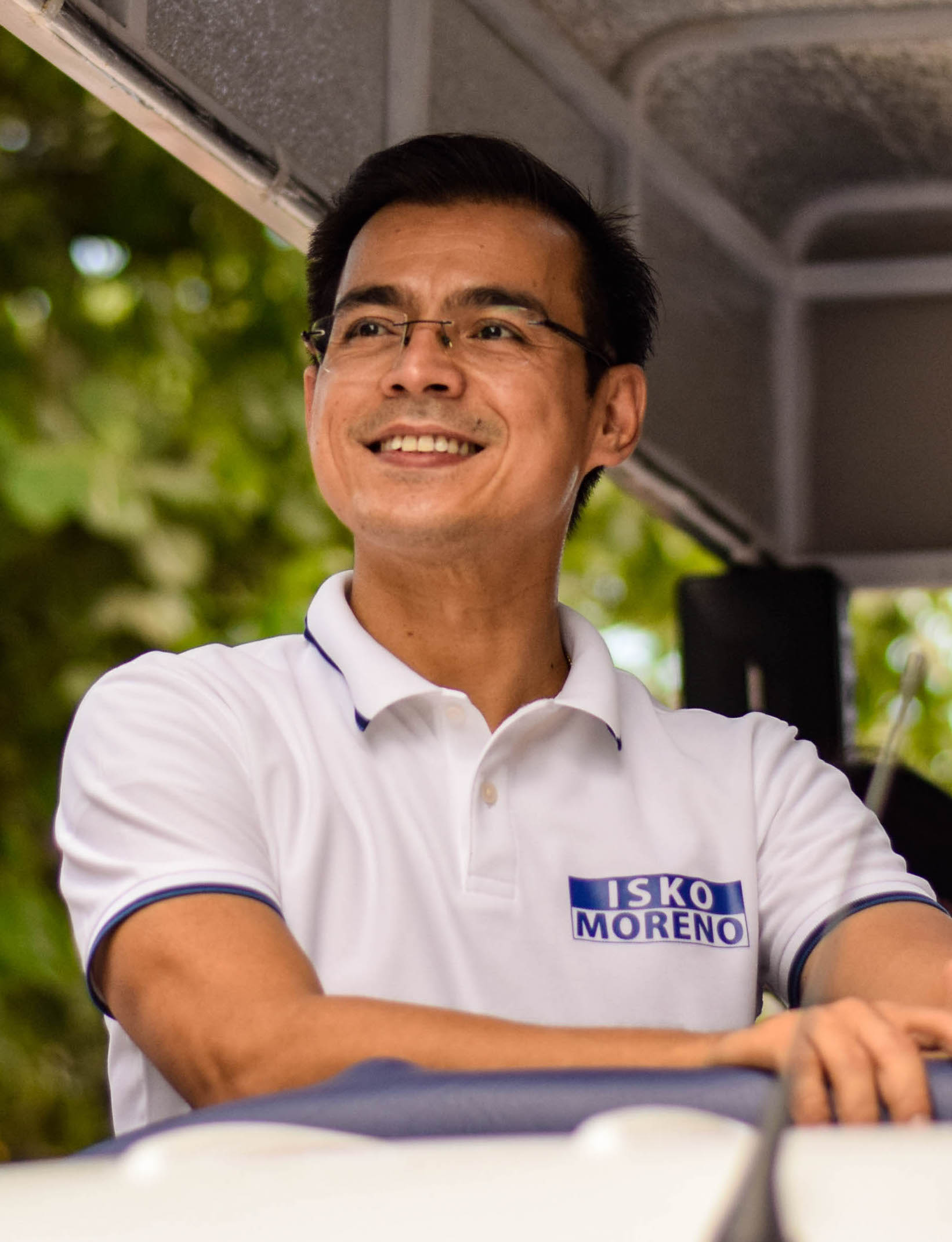
Isko Moreno

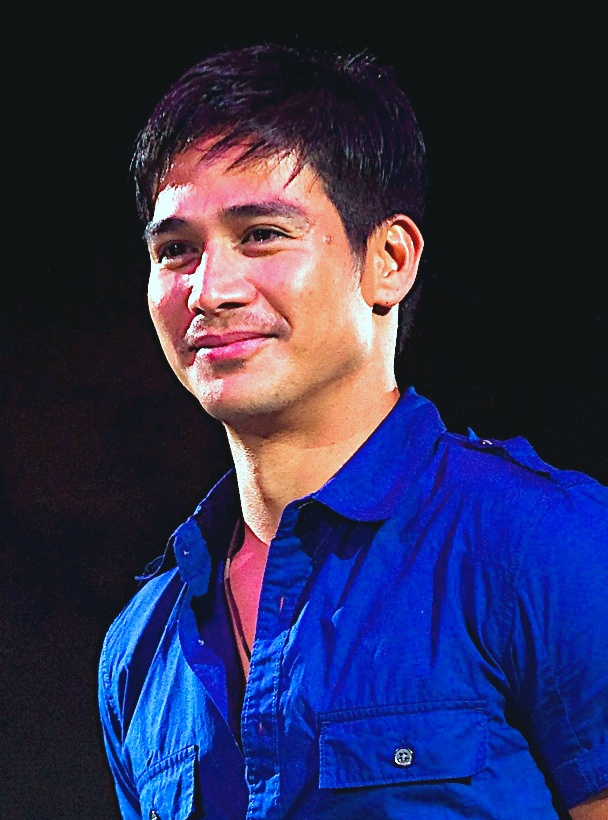
PJ Pascual

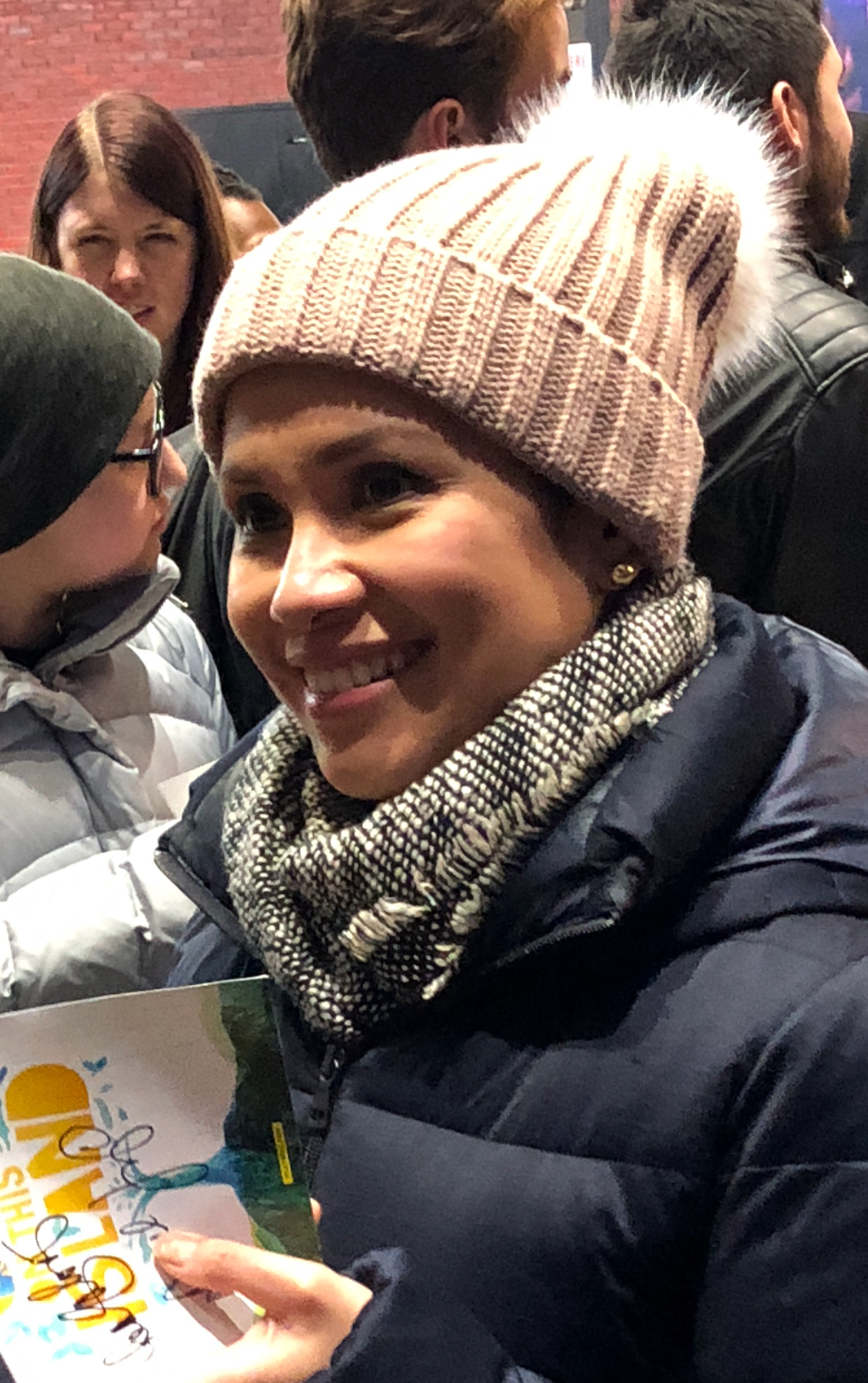
Lea Salonga

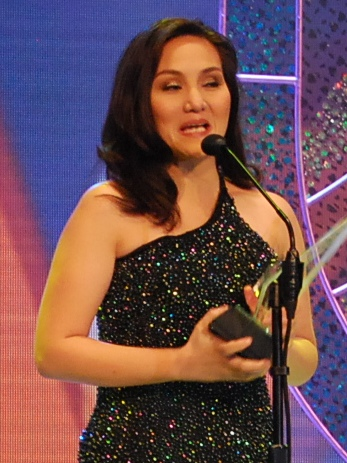
Gladys Reyes

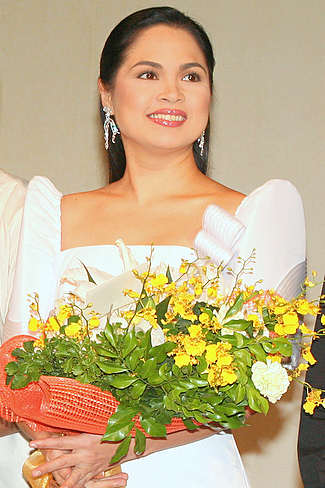
Judy Ann Santos

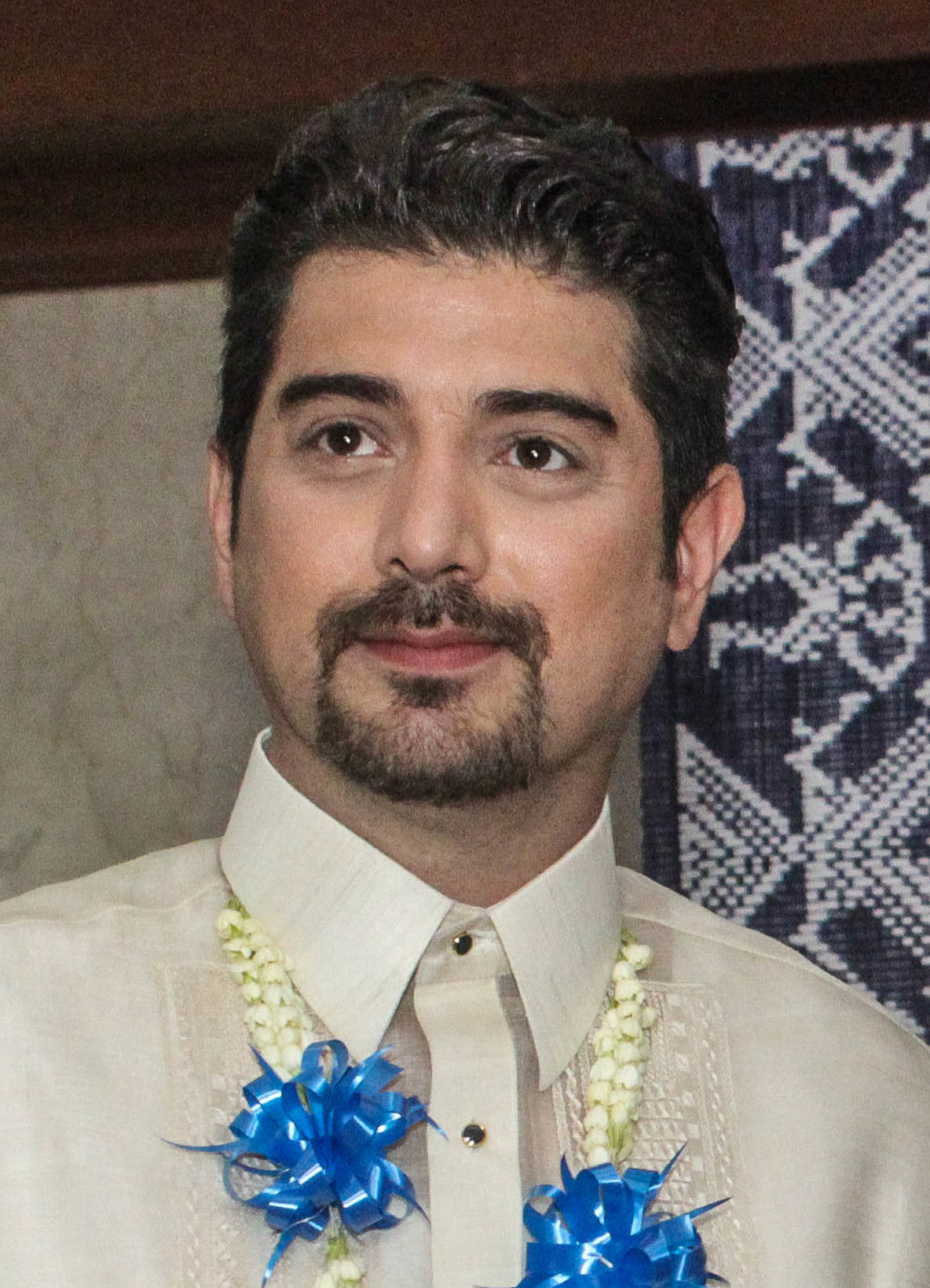
Ian Veneracion

Hosts

- German Moreno
- Ike Lozada

Original cast

- Jestoni Alarcon
- Jojo Alejar
- Mon Alvir
- J.C. Bonnin
- Mags Bonnin
- Ramon Christopher
- Sheryl Cruz
- Lotlot de Leon
- Jennifer Sevilla
- Gigi dela Riva
- Michael Gonzales
- Jon Hernandez
- Francis Magalona
- Kristina Paner
- Manilyn Reynes
- Lovely Rivero
- Lea Salonga

Succeeding cast

- Jojo Abellana
- Champaigne Acosta
- Ana Abiera
- Aris Adina
- John Aey
- Lorie Anne Aguas
- Bernard Alan
- John Alba
- Almira Alcantara
- Jon Aldeguer
- Rachel Alejandro
- Fatima Alvir
- Aileen Pearl Angeles
- Michael Angelo
- Mark Anthony
- Ellie Rose Apple
- Ryan Aristorenas
- Janet Arnaiz
- Sharmaine Arnaiz
- Reyna Arroyo
- Jun King Austria
- Rita Avila
- Marco Ballesteros
- Raeyan Basa
- Bimbo Bautista
- Harlene Bautista
- Dranreb Belleza
- Romeo Beña
- Vincent Berba
- Richard Bonnin
- Maricone Borja
- Michael Brian
- Arabell Cadocio
- Genesis Canlapan
- Cary
- Gem Castillo
- Mike Castillo
- Gwen Chandler
- Billy Christian
- Johnson Correa
- Cliff Cortazar
- Billy Joe Crawford
- Mutya Crisostomo
- Aubrey Rose Cruz
- Darwin Cruz
- Donna Cruz
- Glenda Cruz
- Jomar Cruz
- Mark Cruz
- Renzo Cruz
- Sunshine Cruz
- Dennis da Silva
- Jonathan Darca
- Jaypee de Guzman
- Keempee de Leon
- Lotlot de Leon
- Assunta de Rossi
- Edwin delos Santos
- Fredmoore delos Santos
- Kim delos Santos
- Cherry Desuasido
- Hazen Desuasido
- Sunshine Dizon
- Chuckie Dreyfus
- George Dural
- DJ Durano
- Francis Enriquez
- Paolo Escudero
- Aileen Esguerra
- Ace Espinosa
- Miguel Espinosa
- Karla Estrada
- Neil Eugenio
- Anna Marie Falcon
- Adette Figueroa
- Jimmy Figueroa
- Jackie Forster
- Caselyn Francisco
- Shirley Fuentes
- Cecile Galvez
- Liza Galvez
- Raymond Garchitorena
- Garry Boy Garcia
- Geebee Garcia
- Jean Garcia
- Jigo Garcia
- Kenneth Garcia
- Marco Polo Garcia
- Leo Mar Gayoso
- Janno Gibbs
- Melissa Gibbs
- Tina Godinez
- Harvey Gomez
- Michael Gomez
- Richie Gonzaga
- Glenn Gonzales
- Katrin Gonzales
- Regina Grace
- Isabel Granada
- Tootsie Guevara
- Ruffa Gutierrez
- Philip Henson
- Melanie Hernandez
- Marichelle Hipolito
- Precious Hipolito
- Ivy Isidoro
- Gary Israel
- Sarah Javier
- Aljon Jimenez
- Paul John
- Angelica Jones
- Kenji
- Jessa Kintanar
- Charo Laude
- Lieza Lazaro
- Melanie Lazaro
- Bamba Leelin
- Cielo Legaspi
- Lilet
- Cherryl Lipana
- Michael Locsin
- Susan Lozada
- Michael Luis
- Mylene Mabanag
- April Magalona
- Reuben Manahan
- Smokey Manaloto
- Kennon Marie
- Czarina Marquez
- Nikki Martell
- Mel Martinez
- Jo Angelo Matias
- Jasmine Mendoza
- Jennifer Mendoza
- Jenny Anne Mendoza
- Marga Mendoza
- Glydel Mercado
- Princess Michelle
- Vanessa Moises
- Brylle Mondejar
- Nadia Montenegro
- Maricel Morales
- Vina Morales
- Maidu Morato
- Isko Moreno
- Migui Moreno
- Mike Moreno
- Jovit Moya
- Almira Muhlach
- Nicole
- Jochelle Olalia
- Allan Ortega
- Michelle Ortega
- Robert Ortega
- Lanie Rose Oteyza
- Christine Padilla
- Joey Palomar
- Maffi Papin
- Bunny Paras
- John Parcero
- Pinky Pascual
- PJ Pascual
- William Paul
- Anthony Perez
- Adrian Pizarras
- Piwee Polintan
- Rufa Mae Quinto
- Gem Ramos
- William Ramos
- Denver Razon
- Atong Redillas
- Gladys Reyes
- Hazel Reyes
- Joy Reyes
- Victor Reyes
- Babyshake Rico
- Manolet Ripol
- Louie Rivera
- Nathaniel Rivera
- Ricky Rivero
- Jenny Roa
- Martin Roa
- Ana Roces
- Arvin Rodriguez
- Jason Roman
- Raffy Romillo
- Pinky Rosas
- Donita Rose
- Royce Rosello
- Anthony Roxas
- Rayno Ruiz
- Filio Salazar
- Marco Salvador
- Mariel Salvador
- John Salve
- Lester Samonte
- Shara Sanchez
- Jeffrey Santos
- Judy Ann Santos
- Romnick Sarmenta
- Ina Sarosa
- Tyrone Sason
- Joed Serrano
- Jennifer Sevilla
- Melissa Silvano
- Marlo Silverio
- Saldy Silvestre
- Ryan Soler
- Symon Soler
- Strawberry
- Beth Tamayo
- Mike Tayag
- Edgar Tejada
- Francis Tejada
- Marc Tejada
- Karen Timbol
- Ramil Tolentino
- Allan Trinidad
- Med Trinidad
- Don Umali
- Bon Vargas
- Romano Vasquez
- Henry Vega
- Ian Veneracion
- Marilyn Villamayor
- Cris Villanueva
- Michael Villanueva
- Mikee Villanueva
- Jayvee Villar
- Marita Villarama
- Steven Villareal
- Carmina Villarroel
- Judy Ann Villavert
- Anthony Wilson
- Ronnel Wolfe
- Levy Yanesa
- Erick Yulo
- Kristine Zablan

== Segments ==
- Rednex Dance Contest
- That's Acting
- That's Star Quiz
- That's Stunting
- That's News
- That's Showbiz
- That's Sports
- That's Punk Rock!
- That's Vidjok
- Workshop on the Air

== Critical reception ==
Henry C. Tejero of Manila Standard, said That's Entertainment to be the worst musical variety show of 1987, stating that it is a "veritable fleamarket with Top 40s music as aural wallpaper and alien video lifestyles grossly distorted to conform with popular imagination as visual hypnosis."

== Accolades ==
Accolades received by That's Entertainment
Year	Award	Category	Recipient	Result	Ref.
1988	2nd PMPC Star Awards for Television	Best Variety Show	That's Entertainment	Nominated	
1992	6th PMPC Star Awards for Television	Best Variety Show	Saturday Entertainment	Won	
1996	10th PMPC Star Awards for Television	Best TV Special	That's....The Reunion	Won	
