= Yagit =

Philippine television drama series

- Also known as: The Street Urchins
- Genre: Drama
- Created by: Eddie Ilarde; Jose Miranda Cruz
- Starring: Jaypee de Guzman; Jocelyn Dela-Cruz; Tom-tom; Ernie Garcia; Amy Austria
- Country of origin: Philippines
- Original language: Tagalog
- No. of episodes: 586

Production
- Camera setup: Multiple-camera setup
- Running time: 60 minutes
- Production companies: GMA Entertainment TV; Program Philippines Inc.

Original release
- Network: GMA Radio-Television Arts
- Release: April 25, 1983 – August 2, 1985

Related
- Yagit (2014)

Yagit (transl. trash / international title: The Street Urchins) is a Philippine television drama series broadcast by GMA Radio-Television Arts. It stars Jaypee de Guzman, Janet Elisa Giron, Jocelyn Dela-Cruz and Tom-tom. It premiered on April 25, 1983. The series concluded on August 2, 1985, with a total of 586 episodes.

The series was adapted into a film Mga Batang Yagit in 1984, and a remake aired in 2014.

== Cast and characters ==
Lead cast

- Jaypee de Guzman as Ding
- Janet Elisa Giron as Elisa
- Jocelyn Dela-Cruz as Jocelyn
- Tom-tom as Tom-tom
- Ernie Garcia as Victor

Supporting cast

- Connie Angeles as Sese
- Jervy Cruz as Jerby
- Romy Diaz as Chito
- Joaquin Fajardo as Damaso
- Ric Santos as Kanor
- Amy Austria as Dolor
- Ana Capri as Crizelda
- Marianne Dela Riva as Lena
- Zeny Zabala as Claudia
- Rowell Santiago as Marino
- Jay Ilagan as Roman
- Mayros Sabelino as Tipanya
- Bembol Roco as Gerardino
