= Hapi House! =

- Genre: Family; Situational comedy
- Written by: Bibeth Orteza
- Directed by: Bert de Leon; Kokoy Jimenez; Carlos Siguion-Reyna
- Starring: Tito Sotto; Sandy Andolong; Helen Gamboa; Chuckie Dreyfus; Isabel Granada; Laura Hermosa; Aga Muhlach
- Theme music composer: Bert de Leon
- Opening theme: "Hapi House"
- Composer: Ruben Cadsawan
- Country of origin: Philippines
- Original language: Filipino

Production
- Executive producer: Lilli Yap
- Producer: Monique S.R. Villonco
- Editor: Carlos Suigion-Reyna
- Camera setup: Multiple-camera setup
- Running time: 60 minutes
- Production companies: IBC Entertainment Group; JEMO Productions; APT Entertainment

Original release
- Network: IBC
- Release: 1986 – 1990

Hapi House! is a Philippine television sitcom series broadcast by IBC. The series is based on the American television sitcom Our House. Directed by Bert de Leon, Kokoy Jimenez and Carlos Siguion-Reyna, Tito Sotto, Sandy Andolong, Chuckie Dreyfus, Isabel Granada, Laura Hermosa and Aga Muhlach. It aired from 1986 to 1990.

== Cast ==
- Tito Sotto as Hapi
- Sandy Andolong
- Helen Gamboa
- Chuckie Dreyfus
- Isabel Granada as Bimbim
- Laura Hermosa
- Aga Muhlach as Rocky
- Coney Reyes as Constancia/Constance

== See also ==
- List of Philippine television shows
