= Personalan =

Philippine television talk show

- Title card
- Genre: Tabloid talk show
- Directed by: Don Michael Perez; Noel Añonuevo
- Presented by: Ali Sotto; Jolina Magdangal; Jean Garcia
- Country of origin: Philippines
- Original language: Tagalog

Production
- Production locations: Quezon City, Philippines
- Camera setup: Multiple-camera setup
- Running time: 42 minutes
- Production company: GMA Entertainment TV

Original release
- Network: GMA News TV
- Release: July 25, 2011 – October 18, 2013

Personalan (transl. getting personal) is a Philippine television talk show broadcast by GMA News TV. Originally hosted by Ali Sotto, it premiered on July 25, 2011. The show concluded on October 18, 2013. Jolina Magdangal and Jean Garcia served as the final hosts.

== Hosts ==
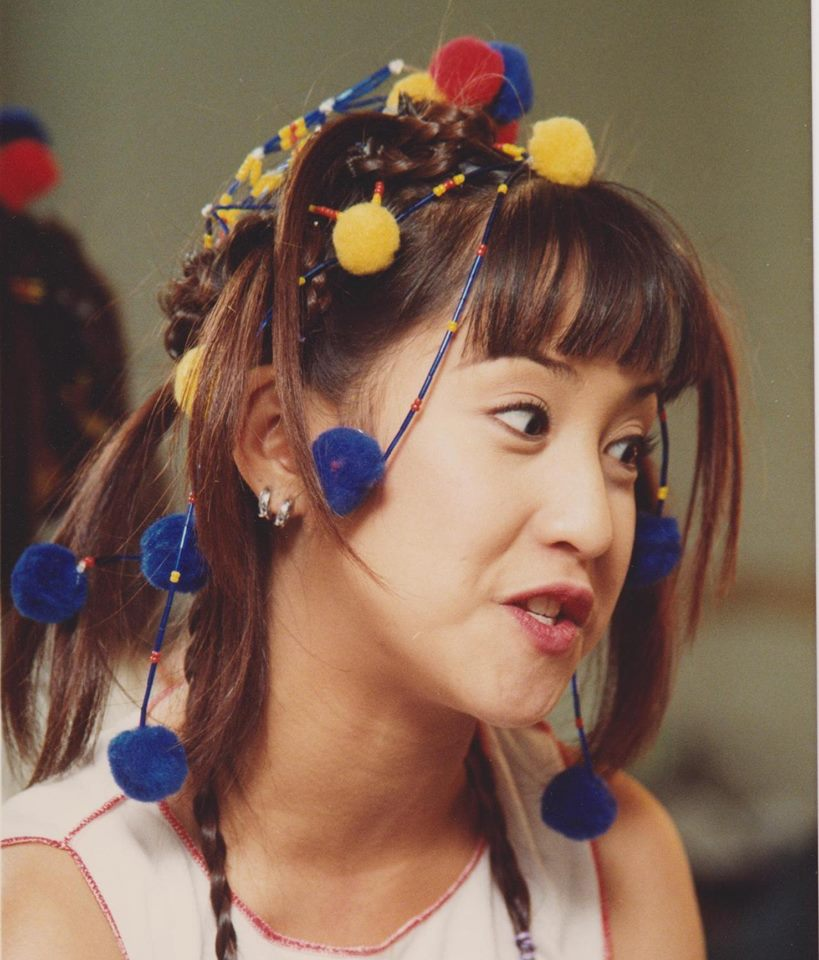
Jolina Magdangal serves as the host.

- Ali Sotto (2011–12)
- Jolina Magdangal (2012–13)
- Jean Garcia (2012–13)

== Accolades ==
Accolades received by Personalan
Year	Award	Category	Recipient	Result	Ref.
2013	27th PMPC Star Awards for Television	Best Public Affairs Program	Personalan	Nominated	
2013	27th PMPC Star Awards for Television	Best Public Affairs Program Host	Jean Garcia Jolina Magdangal	Nominated	
2014	28th PMPC Star Awards for Television	Best Public Affairs Program Host	Jean Garcia Jolina Magdangal	Nominated	
