= Isabel Granada =

Filipina actress and singer

- Granada at the photoshoot of Cielo de Angelina.
- Born: Isabella Villarama Granada; March 9, 1976
- Died: November 4, 2017 (aged 41); Doha, Qatar
- Occupations: Actress, singer, endorser
- Years active: 1985–2017
- Spouses: Geryk Genasky (m. 2002; ann. 2015) Arnel Cowley (m. 2015)
- Children: 1 son, 2 stepdaughters
- Military career
- Allegiance: Philippines
- Branch: Philippine Air Force
- Rank: Airman Second Class

Isabella "Isabel" Villarama Granada-Cowley (Tagalog: [ʔɪsaˈbɛl gɾaˈnada]; March 9, 1976 – November 4, 2017) was a Filipino actress and singer.

== Early life and education ==
Isabel Granada was born on March 9, 1976, the daughter of Humberto Ortiz Granada, a Filipino chief marine engineer, and Isabel Villarama, a Spanish homemaker. Her father died in 1995.

Granada attended the Philippine Air Transport and Training Services College, where she obtained her bachelor's degree in aeronautical engineering in 2001 and secured her private pilot license. She served as an airwoman second class in the Philippine Air Force for two years.

== Career ==
Granada was a commercial model prior to starting a career in acting.

=== Acting ===
Granada's career started after auditioning for That's Entertainment in 1986, where she became a member of the Tuesday group. She was part of the cast of the film, Ligaya ang Itawag Mo sa Akin which starred Rosanna Roces, and was given the FAMAS Award for Best Supporting Actress in 1998 for her role in the film. After joining the cast of Ikaw Na Sana Granada became part of the drama series on ABS-CBN entitled Sa Puso Ko Iingatan Ka co-work with Judy Ann Santos and Piolo Pascual.

Granada took a break from showbiz from 2004 to 2006 after giving birth to her son. She resumed her acting career in 2007 with GMA Network and worked with Sine Novela: Pasan Ko Ang Daigdig and Zaido: Pulis Pangkalawakan.

In 2008, Granada played the role of Elena Valderama in the remake of Kaputol ng Isang Awit with co-star Glaiza de Castro and Lovi Poe, recently shown on the GMA Network. She also appeared in the romantic comedy drama Philippine remake Lalola. In 2009, she was one of the guest stars in the Philippine adaptation of Zorro. During her final years in 2013, she joined It's Showtime's Bida Kapamilya Celebrity Round with her Kapamilya's and she was working again on ABS-CBN's Got to Believe as Tessa Zaragosa, along with Kathryn Bernardo and Daniel Padilla, among others.

In 2017, Granada played the challenging role of Jessica in Wish Ko Lang wherein she portrayed a woman disguised as a man just to feed her kids. No one knew that the new carpenter was a woman. She also appeared in the ABS-CBN show A Love to Last as Cris, which was Granada’s final role before her death.

=== Music ===
Granada released her self-titled debut album under Dypro Records in 1990 with songs like "Crush na Crush", "Classmate Dear Classmate", and "My Inspiration".

In 1998, Granada released the album Out Here on My Own and in 2000 she released In the Mood for Love.

== Personal life ==
Granada's first marriage was to Geryk Genasky Aguas, a councilor in Pampanga in 2002. They eventually separated after twelve years, but their relationship produced one son, Hubert Thomas Jericho Granada Aguas. She married Arnel Cowley in 2015, and was a stepmother to his daughters: Sarah, a young model and Abbey Cowley.

Around 2006, Granada underwent oophorectomy of her right ovary after a cyst had developed; she again had to undergo the operation in 2008 after two cysts had grown on her left ovary, which were accidentally discovered during a removal of a benign tumor in her uterus.

== Coma and death ==
On October 25, 2017, Granada fell into a coma after experiencing six cardiac arrests during a meet and greet session with her fans in Doha, Qatar. Granada had traveled to Doha with her husband to attend the Philippine Tourism and Trade Conference, where she was a guest speaker. She was rushed to the Heart Hospital of the Hamad Medical Corporation and was later transferred to Hamad General Hospital.

Granada had suffered from a brain hemorrhage and aneurysm that affected her heart. On October 27, 2017, she was declared brain dead. Granada died on November 4, 2017, at age 41. Her body was laid in state on November 10–11 at Santuario de San Jose in East Greenhills, Mandaluyong, and was cremated on November 12.

== Legacy ==
Granada was posthumously awarded a star on the Eastwood City Walk of Fame on November 21, 2017.

In December 2017, actress Kim Rodriguez portrayed Granada and actor Benjamin Alves as Granada's husband, Arnel Cowley for their love story on the drama anthology, Wagas.

== Filmography ==
=== Film ===
Year	Title	Role
1985	Magchumikap Ka!	Isabel
1986	Bakit Madalas ang Tibok ng Puso	Andrea
1987	1 + 1 = 12 (+ 1): One Plus One Equals Twelve (Cheaper by the Dozen)	
1988	Lost Command	
1988	Kambal Tuko	Isabel
1989	Isang Araw Walang Diyos	Santa Babae
1989	Yes, Yes, Yo Kabayong Kutsero	
1989	Huwag Kang Hahalik sa Diablo	Sabsy
1989	Regal Shocker (The Movie)	
1990	Papa's Girl	
1990	Lessons in Love	
1990	Shake, Rattle & Roll II	Consuela
1990	Tora Tora, Bang Bang Bang	
1991	Umiyak Pati Langit	Karren
1993	Maton	
1994	Chickboys	Matet
1995	Si Mario at si Goko	
1995	The Grepor Butch Belgica Story	Girlfriend No. 3
1997	Boy Chico: Hulihin si Ben Tumbling	
1997	Ligaya ang Itawag Mo sa Akin	Estela
1999	Hubad sa Ilalim ng Buwan	Buwan
2000	Anghel de la Guardia	Terresa
2000	Eskort	
2001	Halik ng Sirena	Mina
2001	Aagos ang Dugo	
2001	Masikip na Ang Mundo mo Labrador	Ligaya
2007	Xenoa	Eli
2007	Kapitan Ambo: Outside De Kulambo	
2008	Pirates Blood	Marisel
2008	Xenoa 2: Clash of the Bloods	Eli
2014	Gangster Lolo	
2016	Fruits N' Vegetables: Mga Bulakboleros	Peter Parker Anderson's Parents
2016	Tisay	Rey
2017	The Blood	

=== Television ===
Year	Title	Role
1986	That's Entertainment	Herself
1987–1990	Hapi House!	Bimbim
1995	Villa Quintana	Rochelle
1997–1998	Ikaw na Sana	Luchi
2001–2003	Sa Puso Ko Iingatan Ka	Adelaine Enriquez
2007	Sine Novela: Pasan Ko Ang Daigdig	Ricca
2007–2008	Zaido: Pulis Pangkalawakan	Luna
2008	Sine Novela: Kaputol ng Isang Awit	Elena Valderama
2008–2009	Lalola	Tala Romina
2008	Obra	Guest Role
2009	Zorro	Minerva
2009	Adik Sa'Yo	Doy
2010	Panday Kids	Tessa
2010	Claudine	Laika Garcia
2011	Survivor Philippines: Celebrity Doubles Showdown	Castaway
2011	Daldalita	Demi
2012	Cielo de Angelina	Czarina
2012	Teen Gen	Angge's mom
2013	It's Showtime	Bida Kapamilya Celebrity Round Grand Champion
2013	Anna Karenina	Alona Villarama
2013	It's Showtime	Herself/Guest Judge
2013	Got to Believe	Tessa Zaragosa
2014	The Singing Bee	Herself/Celebrity Player
2014	Pepito Manaloto: Ang Tunay na Kuwento	Lilybeth Lopez
2016	Imbestigador: Mag-Ina	Emerald Bartolome
2016	Maynila: Unrequited Love	Loreta
2016	Karelasyon: Trip	Piper
2016	Celebrity Bluff	Herself/player
2016	Imbestigador: Loreta	Loreta
2016	Eat Bulaga!	Herself/contestant
2016	Mars	Herself/guest
2016	Wansapanataym: Holly & Mau	Mariel Benitez
2017	Pinoy M.D.	Herself
2017	Maalaala Mo Kaya	Alda
2017	Wish Ko Lang!	Jessica
2017	Tadhana	Natalia
2017	Pop Talk	Herself
2017	A Love to Last	Cris (Last TV appearance)
