= Manilyn Reynes =

Filipina actress and singer (born 1972)

- Born: Manilyn Villamor Reynes; April 27, 1972 (age 54); Manila, Philippines
- Occupations: Actress; singer; television presenter; comedian
- Years active: 1983–present
- Agent: Sparkle (2006-present)
- Television: ABS-CBN; GMA Network; RPN; TV5
- Spouse: Aljon Jimenez (m. 1996)
- Children: 3
- Musical career
- Genres: Pop; OPM; Ballad
- Instrument: Vocal
- Years active: 1984–present
- Labels: Ivory; PolyEast; GMA

Manilyn Reynes (Note: Reynes' husband, actor Al John Manoloto, used the stage name Aljon Jimenez) (born April 27, 1972) is a Filipina actress, singer and television presenter. She is regarded as a Philippine pop culture icon and dubbed as the Star of All Decades. She has achieved mainstream success across film, music and television. She is currently an exclusive talent of GMA Network. She has received accolades from the FAMAS Awards, Awit Awards, and Metro Manila Film Festival. She is the fourth actress with the most wins (3) at the PMPC Star Awards for TV in the "Best Comedy Actress" category.

== Early life and education ==
Reynes was born on April 27, 1972, in Manila and grew up in Cebu. Her parents are Nelson Reynes y Clarín and Lounching Villamor. Her family moved to Cebú when she was only a few days old. She studied in Terejo Elementary School until third grade. She attended the basic education unit of the University of Southern Philippines Foundation in Cebu during her fourth and mid-fifth grade before leaving for Manila.

== Career ==
Prior to acting, Reynes started her career by joining a singing contest in Cebu. She was only 8 years old when she became a 7 weeks Champion in Weewee Jamboree Singing contest, and came in second place at the grand finals.

After her family moved back to Manila, she was launched as a child actor in Regal Films, To Mama with Love (1983). She also appeared in the movie Minsan, May Isang Ina (1983) for which she won the FAMAS Award for Best Child Actress in 1984. She also became a recording artist under Ivory Records and released three albums.

As a teenager, Reynes was one of the original members of the television variety show That's Entertainment (1986). In 1988, she signed with OctoArts International and released a self-titled album, Manilyn, featuring her hit single Sayang na Sayang which became a commercial success and earned her a platinum award. She continued to release 10 more albums under OctoArts International (known as PolyEast Records). Reynes had a concert in Araneta Coliseum and Ultra Stadium in 1990. She was also the youngest artist to hold a concert at the Araneta Coliseum in that same year.

== Personal life ==
Reynes previously dated actor Janno Gibbs.They were a popular loveteam in the 80s until their break up in 1989.

She met her husband, Aljon Jimenez in the variety show, That's Entertainment but did not take notice of each other until they worked together in the movie, Shake, Rattle & Roll II in 1990. Reynes and Jimenez was in a situationship, acting like a real-life couple but without commitment. Then Jimenez disappeared and cut off all their communication. In 1991, he surprised Reynes on her 19th birthday after a year-long without contact. The two had an argument until she found out that he disappeared out of jealousy.

Reynes married former matinee idol and actor Aljon Jimenez in Reno, Nevada U.S.A. in 1996. They have three children, Kyle, Kirk, and Kael Jimenez.

== Discography ==
Reynes released 13 studio albums and 2 compilation albums.

=== Studio albums ===
| Title | Album details | Sales | Certifications | Ref(s) |
|---|---|---|---|---|
| Apple Thoughts | Released: 1984; Label: Ivory Records; Format: Vinyl, LP | —N/a | —N/a | |
| Manilyn, Christmas | Released: 1984; Label: Ivory Records; Format: Vinyl, LP | —N/a | —N/a | |
| Triplets (with Sheryl Cruz and Tina Paner) | Released: 1986; Label: Ivory Records; Format: Vinyl, LP | —N/a | —N/a | |
| Manilyn | Released: 1988; Label: PolyEast Records; Format: LP, Cassette | PHI: 80,000 | PARI: 2× Platinum | |
| Heartbeat | Released: 1989; Label: PolyEast Records; Format: LP, Cassette | PHI: 20,000 | PARI: Gold | |
| Gugma | Released: 1990; Label: PolyEast Records; Format: LP, Cassette | —N/a | —N/a | |
| High Energy | Released: 1991; Label: PolyEast Records; Format: LP, Cassette | —N/a | —N/a | |
| Still in Love | Released: 1992; Label: PolyEast Records; Format: LP, Cassette | —N/a | —N/a | |
| Mula sa Puso | Released: 1993; Label: PolyEast Records; Format: LP, Cassette | PHI: 20,000 | PARI: Gold | |
| Voices | Released: 1995; Label: PolyEast Records; Format: LP, Cassette | —N/a | —N/a | |
| True Love Ways | Released: May 1996; Label: PolyEast Records; Format: LP, Cassette | —N/a | —N/a | |
| Once More | Released: 2001; Label: Ivory Records; Format: LP, Cassette | —N/a | —N/a | |
| Manilyn, Loving Mom | Released: 2009; Label: GMA Records; Format: CD, digital download | —N/a | —N/a | |

=== Compilation album ===
| Title | Album details | Certifications |
|---|---|---|
| Voices | Released: 1993; Label: PolyEast Records; Formats: Vinyl LP, Album, Stereo | |
| Story of Manilyn Reynes | Released: 2001; Label: EMI Virgin Records; Formats:CD complications | |

=== Singles ===
| Year | Title | Album | Certifications |
|---|---|---|---|
| 1988 | "Sayang na Sayang" | Manilyn | PARI: Platinum; PHI: 30,000+ |
| 1989 | "Somewhere Along the Way" | Manilyn | —N/a |
| 1989 | "Feel na feel" | Heartbeat | —N/a |
| 1990 | "Ikaw pa rin" | Heartbeat | —N/a |
| 1990 | "Maasahan mo" | Manilyn Reynes | —N/a |
| 1990 | "Mr. Disco" | High Energy | —N/a |
| 1991 | "Kung Sino pa ang Minamahal" | High Energy | —N/a |
| 1992 | "Still in love with you" | Still in love | —N/a |
| 1992 | "Shake it Baby" | Still in love | —N/a |
| 1993 | "Nais ko'y ay iyong Pag-ibig" | Mula sa Puso | —N/a |

== Concerts ==
=== Major Concerts ===
| Year | Title | Venue |
|---|---|---|
| 1990 | Feel na feel concert: Manilyn Reyes live | Smart Araneta Coliseum |
| 1992 | 10 at 20 concert | PhilSports Arena (formerly known as Ultra Stadium) |
| 2007 | Manilyn Reynes Live at 25 | Aliw Theater |
| 2017 | The Triplets concert | Music Museum |

== Filmography ==
=== Film ===
| Year | Title | Role | Ref. |
|---|---|---|---|
| 1983 | To Mama with Love | | |
| 1983 | Minsan May Isang Ina | | |
| 1984 | Dear Mama | | |
| 1984 | Daddy Knows Best | | |
| 1985 | Ride on Baby | | |
| 1985 | I Have Three Hands | | |
| 1985 | Mga Kwento ni Lola Basyang | | |
| 1986 | When I Fall in Love | | |
| 1986 | Horsey-Horsey, Tigidig-Tigidig | | |
| 1986 | Ang Daigdig Ay Isang Butil Na Luha | | |
| 1986 | Batang Quiapo | Mona | |
| 1986 | Payaso | | |
| 1987 | Jack en Poy: Hale-Hale Hoy | | |
| 1987 | Family Tree | | |
| 1988 | Stupid Cupid | | |
| 1988 | Wake Up Little Susie | Maniquin | |
| 1988 | Super Inday and the Golden Bibe | | |
| 1988 | Love Letters | | |
| 1988 | Petrang Kabayo at ang Pilyang Kuting | Pinky | |
| 1988 | Me and Ninja Liit | Simang | |
| 1989 | Magic to Love | | |
| 1989 | Isang Araw Walang Diyos | | |
| 1989 | SuperMouse and the Robo-Rats | | |
| 1990 | Ganda Babae, Ganda Lalake | | |
| 1990 | Michael and Madonna | Madonna | |
| 1990 | Feel Na Feel | | |
| 1990 | Small en Terrible | Inday (Tarzila Borlongan) | |
| 1990 | Shake, Rattle & Roll II | Portia | |
| 1991 | Kung Sino Pang Minamahal | | |
| 1991 | Luv Ko si Ma'am | | |
| 1991 | The Adventures of Gary Leon at Kuting | | |
| 1991 | Shake, Rattle & Roll III | Maloy | |
| 1992 | Daddy Goon | | |
| 1992 | Aswang | Veron | |
| 1992 | Shake, Rattle & Roll IV | Jodie | |
| 1993 | Ligaw-ligawan, Kasal-kasalan, Bahay-bahayan | | |
| 1993 | Ulong Pugot Naglalagot | | |
| 1993 | Bulag, Pipi at Bingi | Nona | |
| 1993 | Michael & Madonna 2 | | |
| 1993 | Milagro | | |
| 1994 | Multo in the City | | |
| 1994 | Ging Gang Gooly Giddiyap | | |
| 1994 | Shake, Rattle & Roll V | Lizbeth | |
| 1995 | Boy Gising | | |
| 1996 | Ober da Bakod 2 (Da Treasure Adbentyur) | Kasoy | |
| 1996 | Milyonaryong Mini | | |
| 1996 | Kailanman | | |
| 1997 | Wang Wang, Buhay Bombero | | |
| 1997 | Ibulong Mo sa Diyos 2 | | |
| 1999 | Sa Piling ng Aswang | | |
| 2000 | Di Ko Kayang Tanggapin | | |
| 2001 | Super Idol | | |
| 2001 | Bahay ni Lola | Patricia | |
| 2006 | Shake, Rattle and Roll 8 | Jean | |
| 2008 | One Night Only | George | |
| 2009 | Ded Na si Lolo | Charing | |
| 2009 | Oh, My Girl! A Laugh Story... | Tala | |
| 2009 | Love on Line (LOL) | Roberta "Bunny" Polistico | |
| 2010 | You to Me Are Everything | Greta | |
| 2014 | My Big Bossing | Jessa's mother | |
| 2021 | Mang Jose | King Ina | |
| 2025 | Shake, Rattle & Roll: Evil Origins | Malena | |

=== Television ===
| Year | Title | Role | Ref. |
|---|---|---|---|
| 1984–1987 | Heredero | | |
| 1986–1996 | That's Entertainment | Herself | |
| 1985–1990 | Eat Bulaga! | Herself / Host | |
| 1988 | Gintong Kristal | Various roles | |
| 1989 | Okay Ka, Fairy Ko! | Prinsesa Lavender / Guest | |
| 1990–1993 | Young Love, Sweet Love | Various roles | |
| 1991–1993 | Lunch Date | Herself / Host | |
| 1994 | Ryan Ryan Musikahan | Herself / Guest | |
| 1994 | Dear Manilyn | Herself / Host | |
| 1994 | Manilyn Live | Herself / Host | |
| 1995–1998 | 'Sang Linggo nAPO Sila | Herself / Co-host | |
| 1996 | Maalaala Mo Kaya | Various Roles | |
| 1996 | Star Drama Theater Presents: Manilyn | Various Roles | |
| 1997 | Spotlight Presents: Manilyn | Various Roles | |
| 1997 | Ober Da Bakod | Kasoy | |
| 1997 | Hapi Kung Healthy | Herself / Host | |
| 1997 | Onli En Da Pelepens | | |
| 1999–2003 | Wansapanataym | Various Roles | |
| 1999–2001 | Sarap TV | Herself / Host | |
| 2001 | Daboy en Da Guard | Various Roles | |
| 2002 | K! The 1 Million Peso Videoke Challenge | Herself / Celebrity Player | |
| 2004 | Maid in Heaven | Filomena | |
| 2005–2009 | Moms | Herself / Host | |
| 2006 | Magpakailanman | Various Roles | |
| 2006–2007 | Carlo J. Caparas' Bakekang | Martha | |
| 2007 | Mga Kuwento ni Lola Basyang | Tita Herbie | |
| 2007–2008 | MariMar | Corazon | |
| 2008 | The Singing Bee (Season 2) | Herself / Celebrity Player / Millionaire | |
| 2009 | All My Life | Sally Estrella | |
| 2009 | SRO Cinema Serye: Eva Castillo Story | Eva Castillo | |
| 2009–2010 | Dear Friend: My Christmas List | Abby's mother | |
| 2010 | First Time | Laura Luna | |
| 2010–present | Pepito Manaloto | Elsa Dela Cruz-Manaloto | |
| 2011 | Magic Palayok | Old Magic Palayok | |
| 2011 | Maalaala Mo Kaya: Internet Shop | Nora | |
| 2011 | Untold Stories Face to Face | Various | |
| 2011 | Pidol's Wonderland: Goata Believe in Magic | Various | |
| 2011–2012 | Daldalita | Katrina De Leon | |
| 2012 | Maalaala Mo Kaya: Kandila | Anna | |
| 2012 | Magpakailanman: The Ryzza Mae Dizon Story | Rizza Dizon | |
| 2013 | Party Pilipinas | Herself / Guest Performer | |
| 2013 | Magpakailanman: Rolando Niangar Story | Sheryl Niangar | |
| 2013 | Wansapanataym: Ang Nawawalang Ngipin Ni Tootsie | DiwaTeeth | |
| 2013 | ASAP 18 | Herself / Guest Performer with Sheryl Cruz & Tina Paner as Triplets | |
| 2013–2014 | Got to Believe | Elizabeth "Betchay / Mama Bear" Lagro-Tampipi | |
| 2014 | My BFF | Lynette "Lyn" Garcia | |
| 2014 | Sunday All Stars | Herself / Guest Performer | |
| 2015 | Once Upon a Kiss | Aurora Servando-Rodrigo | |
| 2015 | Sabado Badoo | Herself / Cameo Footage Featured | |
| 2015–2016 | Destiny Rose | Daisy Flores-Vergara | |
| 2016 | Magpakailanman: Zumba Dancing Boy – Balang | Mary Jane Bughaw | |
| 2016 | Poor Señorita | Madame Ligaya "Aya" De Beauvoir | |
| 2016 | Sinungaling Mong Puso | Angelica Robles | |
| 2017 | Meant to Be | Amelia Altamirano-Bendiola | |
| 2017 | Road Trip | Herself / Guest with Sheryl Cruz and Tina Paner | |
| 2017 | Dear Uge: Aso't Pusa | Karen | |
| 2018 | Inday Will Always Love You | Marta Magtibay | |
| 2019–2020 | Madrasta | Grace Segundo | |
| 2021 | The Lost Recipe | Conchita Valencia | |
| 2021–24 | All-Out Sundays | Herself / Co-host / Performer / Various roles | |
| 2022 | Wish Ko Lang: Ibinagsak | Vangie | |
| 2022–2023 | Maria Clara at Ibarra | Narcisa ''Narsing'' Infantes-Asunción | |
| 2023 | It's Showtime | Herself / Guest performer with Michael V. | |
| 2023 | Abot-Kamay na Pangarap | Melba Salazar (guest star) | |
| 2025 | Encantadia Chronicles: Sang'gre | Mona Reyes | |
| 2026 | Born to Shine | Minchie Reyes-Sicat | |

== Awards and nominations ==
Awards and nominations received by Manilyn Reynes
| Award (Note: Awards, festivals, honors and other miscellaneous organizations are listed in alphabetical order.) | Year (Note: Indicates the year of ceremony. Each year is linked to the article about the awards held that year, wherever possible.) | Category | Nominated work | Result | Ref. |
|---|---|---|---|---|---|
| Aliw Awards | 2008 | Best Major Female Concert | Manilyn Live @25 | Nominated | |
| Alta Media Icon Awards | 2018 | Best Comedy Program Actress | Pepito Manaloto | Won | |
| Awit Awards | 1991 | Best Christmas Recording | Miss Kita sa Christmas | Nominated | |
| Awit Awards | 1991 | Record of the Year | Mr. Disco | Won | |
| Awit Awards | 1991 | Best Dance Recording | Mr. Disco | Won | |
| Awit Awards | 1991 | Best Revival Recording | Mr. Disco | Won | |
| BPSU Kagitingan Awards for Television | 2018 | Pinakamagiting na Personalidad ng Comedy Program | Pepito Manaloto | Won | |
| Catholic Mass Media Awards | 2016 | Best Comedy Program | Pepito Manaloto | Won | |
| Catholic Mass Media Awards | 2017 | Hall of Fame Award | Pepito Manaloto | Won | |
| EdukCircle Awards | 2019 | Best TV Comedienne | Pepito Manaloto | Nominated | |
| FAMAS Awards | 1984 | Best Child Actress | Minsan May Isang Ina | Won | |
| FAMAS Awards | 1985 | Best Child Actress | Dear Mama | Nominated | |
| FAMAS Awards | 2010 | Best Supporting Actress | Ded na si Lolo | Nominated | |
| Golden Screen TV Awards | 2011 | Outstanding Performance by an Actress in a Gag or Comedy Program | Pepito Manaloto | Nominated | |
| Golden Screen TV Awards | 2014 | Outstanding Performance by an Actress in a Gag or Comedy Program | Pepito Manaloto | Nominated | |
| Golden Screen TV Awards | 2015 | Outstanding Performance by an Actress in a Gag or Comedy Program | Pepito Manaloto | Nominated | |
| Metro Manila Film Festival | 2008 | Best Supporting Actress | One Night Only | Won | |
| PMPC Star Awards for Television | 2006 | Best Celebrity Talk Show Host | Moms | Nominated | |
| PMPC Star Awards for Television | 2007 | Best Celebrity Talk Show Host | Moms | Nominated | |
| PMPC Star Awards for Television | 2007 | Best Drama Actress | Bakekang | Nominated | |
| PMPC Star Awards for Television | 2008 | Best Celebrity Talk Show Host | Moms | Nominated | |
| PMPC Star Awards for Television | 2012 | Best Comedy Actress | Pepito Manaloto | Nominated | |
| PMPC Star Awards for Television | 2013 | Best Comedy Actress | Pepito Manaloto | Nominated | |
| PMPC Star Awards for Television | 2014 | Best Comedy Actress | Pepito Manaloto | Nominated | |
| PMPC Star Awards for Television | 2014 | Best Drama Supporting Actress | Got to Believe | Nominated | |
| PMPC Star Awards for Television | 2015 | Best Comedy Actress | Pepito Manaloto | Nominated | |
| PMPC Star Awards for Television | 2016 | Best Drama Supporting Actress | Destiny Rose | Nominated | |
| PMPC Star Awards for Television | 2016 | Best Comedy Actress | Pepito Manaloto | Won | |
| PMPC Star Awards for Television | 2017 | Best Comedy Actress | Pepito Manaloto | Nominated | |
| PMPC Star Awards for Television | 2018 | Best Comedy Actress | Pepito Manaloto | Nominated | |
| PMPC Star Awards for Television | 2019 | Best Comedy Actress | Pepito Manaloto | Nominated | |
| PMPC Star Awards for Television | 2021 | Best Comedy Actress | Pepito Manaloto | Won | |
| PMPC Star Awards for Television | 2023 | Best Comedy Actress | Pepito Manaloto | Won | |
