= Bamba (actress) =

Filipina actress and entrepreneur (born 1979)

Bamba Leelin Cruz
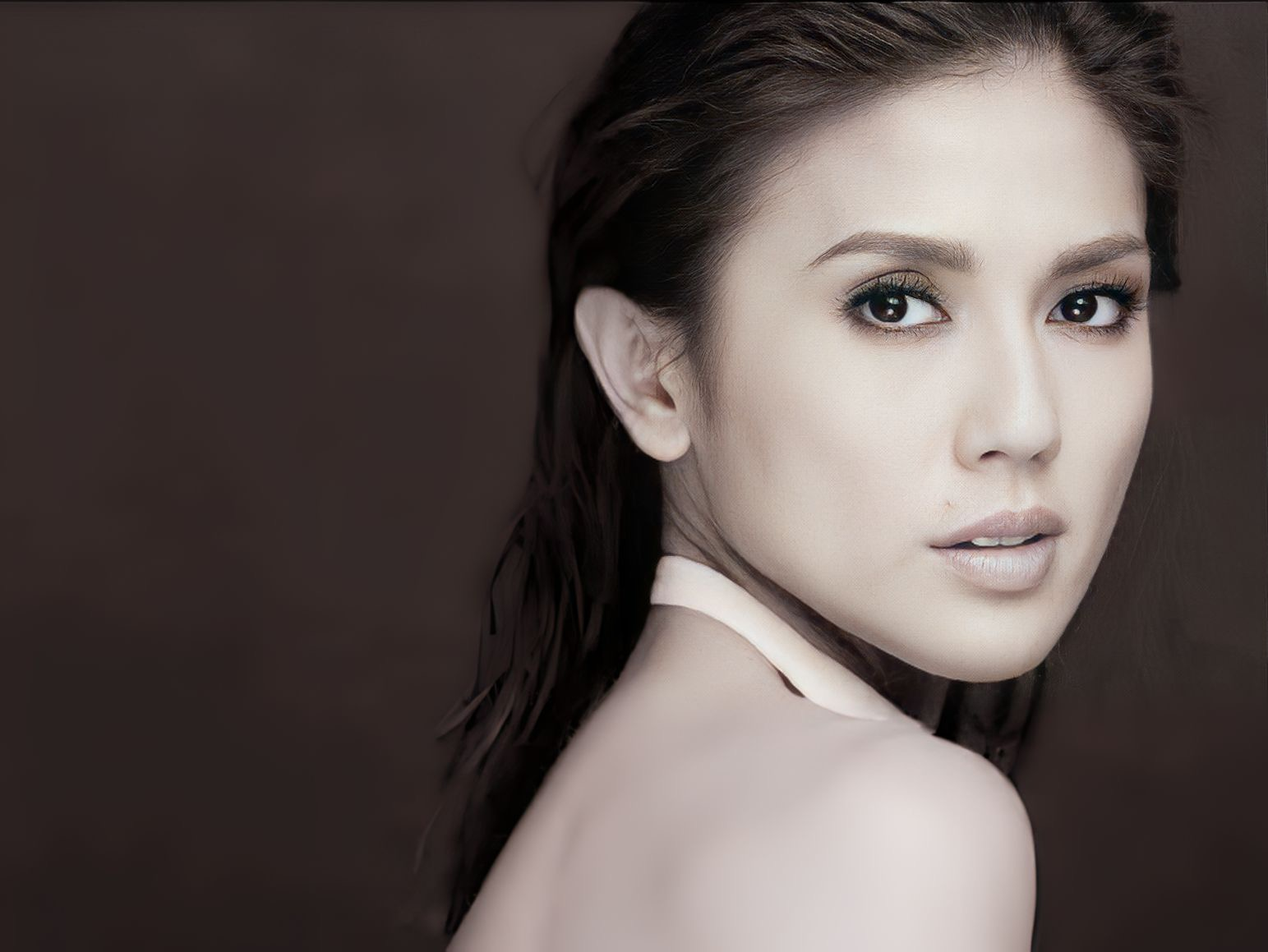
- Portrait of Bamba Leelin Cruz, 2020s
- Born: Marvee Lou Basa Leelin; August 8, 1979 (age 47); Manila, Philippines
- Education: OB Montessori, Colegio San Agustin – Makati, De La Salle–College of Saint Benilde
- Occupations: Actress, entrepreneur
- Years active: 1984–1996
- Spouse: Jesus "Jay" Tan Cruz (m. 2005)
- Children: 1
- Relatives: Lana Leelin Reyes (sister), Benjo Leelin (brother)
- Awards: FAMAS Award for Best Child Actress (1986)

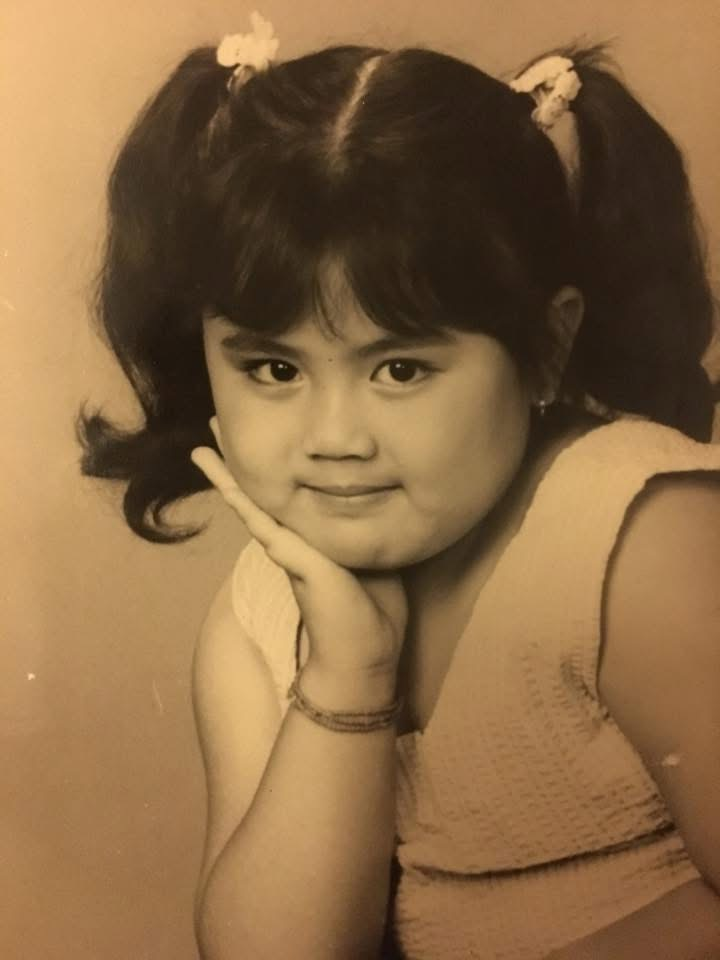
Bamba Leelin Cruz in the mid-1980s

Bamba Leelin Cruz (born Marvee Lou Basa Leelin; August 8, 1979) is a Filipina former child actress and entrepreneur. She rose to fame in the 1980s as one of the country's most beloved child stars, winning the FAMAS Award for Best Child Actress for her role in Moomoo (1985). After retiring from the entertainment industry, she pursued studies in production design and later built a career in fashion and jewelry entrepreneurship.

== Early life and education ==
Leelin was born in Manila, Philippines, to Pascual Tancioco Leelin Jr. and Violeta Basa Leelin. She is one of three full siblings: her sister Lana Leelin Reyes and brother Benjo Leelin. Her family is linked to the founding lineage of Goldilocks Bakeshop, one of the Philippines' most iconic food chains. Her father, Pascual Tancioco Leelin Jr., is the younger brother of Milagros Leelin Yee and Clarita Leelin Go, the original co-founders of Goldilocks in 1966. Leelin studied at OB Montessori and Colegio San Agustin – Makati, and completed her degree in Production Design at De La Salle–College of Saint Benilde.

== Career ==
Leelin began acting at the age of 4, first appearing in Little Miss Philippines on Eat Bulaga!. Her breakout role in Moomoo (1985) led to her receiving a FAMAS Award at age six. She went on to appear in numerous fantasy and comedy films throughout the late 1980s and became one of the most recognizable child stars of the era.

She also appeared in the drama series Gulong ng Palad and joined the Tuesday group of the teen variety show That's Entertainment on GMA Network.

== Business ventures ==
After her showbiz career, Leelin partnered with her sister Lana to launch a clothing brand, which was carried by select SM department stores. In the 2020s, she founded The Tatted Jeweller, a fine jewelry label marketed on Instagram, known for its storytelling-driven gold pieces and custom designs.

== Personal life ==
Leelin married Jesus “Jay” Tan Cruz in 2005. They have one daughter, Jaela. She remains known for her grounded and creative personality, maintaining strong family ties and continuing to influence fashion and design circles.

== Public image and legacy ==
Leelin is considered a defining figure in the “Golden Age” of Filipino child stardom. Her performances have been celebrated in pop culture retrospectives, and she was profiled by Philippine Tatler in 2016 for her transition from showbiz to entrepreneurship.

== Filmography ==
=== Film ===
Year	Title	Type	Ref.
1985	Moomoo	Film	[1][2]
1986	God's Little Children	Film	
1986	Tuklaw	Film	
1987	Once Upon a Time	Film	
1987	Bunsong Kerubin	Film	
1987	No Retreat... No Surrender... Si Kumander	Film	
1987	1 + 1 = 12 (+ 1): One Plus One Equals Twelve	Film	
1988	Love Boat: Mahal Trip Kita	Film	
1988	Nakausap Ko ang Birhen	Film	
1988	Love Letters	Film	
1988	One Day, Isang Araw	Film	
1988	Petrang Kabayo at ang Pilyang Kuting	Film	
1988	Sheman: Mistress of the Universe	Film	
1989	Barbi: Maid in the Philippines	Film	
1989	Bote, Dyaryo, Garapa	Film	
1989	Pulis Pulis sa Ilalim ng Tulay	Film	
1989	Captain Yagit	Film	
1993	Pido Dida 3: May Kambal Na	Film	

=== Television ===
Year	Title
1984	Eat Bulaga! – Little Miss Philippines Grand Finalist
1986–1990	Gulong ng Palad
1992–1995	That's Entertainment

== Awards and honors ==
- FAMAS Award for Best Child Actress – Moomoo (1986)
