= Pinoy M.D. =

Philippine television infotainment show

- Title card since 2023
- Also known as: Pinoy M.D. Mga Doktor ng Bayan
- Genre: Infotainment
- Directed by: Cris Pablo; Rember Gelera
- Presented by: Connie Sison; David Ampil II; Raul Quillamor; Oyie Balburias; Jean Marquez
- Opening theme: "Pinoy M.D." by T.O.P. (Top One Project)
- Country of origin: Philippines
- Original language: Tagalog

Production
- Executive producer: Marla Oliva
- Camera setup: Multiple-camera setup
- Running time: 60 minutes
- Production company: GMA Public Affairs

Original release
- Network: GMA Network
- Release: June 12, 2010 – present

Pinoy M.D. (transl. Filipino M.D.) is a Philippine television infotainment show broadcast by GMA Network. Hosted by Connie Sison, David Ampil II, Raul Quillamor, Oyie Balburias and Jean Marquez, it premiered on June 12, 2010.

== Premise ==
The show provides information on diseases and medical concerns of the people nowadays. It also provided free on-air consultation for the viewers, which was later discontinued.

== Hosts ==
- Connie Sison
- David Ampil II
- Raul Quillamor
- Oyie Balburias
- Jean Marquez

Segment host

- Suzy Entrata

== Production ==
In March 2020, production was halted due to the enhanced community quarantine in Luzon caused by the COVID-19 pandemic. The show resumed its programming on September 15, 2020.

== Accolades ==
Accolades received by Pinoy M.D.
Year	Award	Category	Recipient	Result	Ref.
2011	Golden Screen TV Awards	Outstanding Public Service Program	Pinoy M.D.	Nominated	
2011	Golden Screen TV Awards	Outstanding Public Service Program Host	Connie Sison	Nominated	
2013	Golden Screen TV Awards	Outstanding Public Service Program	Pinoy M.D.	Nominated	
2013	Golden Screen TV Awards	Outstanding Public Affairs Host	Connie Sison	Nominated	
2014	Golden Screen TV Awards	Outstanding Public Service Program	Pinoy M.D.	Nominated	
2014	Golden Screen TV Awards	Outstanding Public Service Program Host	Connie Sison	Nominated	
2019	Anak TV Seal Awards		Pinoy M.D.	Won	
