= Calvento Files =

Philippine crime television series

- Title card
- Genre: Reality; Investigative program True crime Documentary drama Documentary
- Created by: ABS-CBN Corporation
- Developed by: ABS-CBN News and Current Affairs
- Directed by: Wenn Deramas; Laurenti M. Dyogi; Johnny Manahan; Nick Lizaso; Ricky Davao; Cathy Garcia-Molina; Michael de Mesa; Jerry Lopez Sineneng; Rory B. Quintos; Gilbert Perez; Don Cuaresma; Rez Cortez
- Presented by: Tony Calvento
- Ending theme: "Obligatory Car Chase" by Elliot Goldenthal
- Country of origin: Philippines
- Original language: Tagalog
- No. of episodes: 128

Production
- Running time: 90 minutes

Original release
- Network: ABS-CBN
- Release: December 15, 1995 – October 2, 1998

Related
- Katapat: Mayor Fred Lim; Case Solved (GMA)

Calvento Files is a Philippine television drama documentary anthology series broadcast by ABS-CBN. Hosted by Tony Calvento, it aired from December 15, 1995, to October 2, 1998, and was replaced by Katapat: Mayor Fred Lim.

This series is currently streaming on the Jeepney TV YouTube channel every 2nd quarter of the month, 5:00 pm together with Kapag May Katwiran... Ipaglaban Mo and Star Drama Theater Presents.

== Film adaptation ==
Calvento Files: The Movie
- Directed by: Michael de Mesa (segment "Inay, May Momo!"); Laurenti Dyogi (segment "Balintuwad")
- Screenplay by: Ricky Lee; Tony Calvento
- Based on: An Incident Written by Tony Calvento
- Produced by: Charo Santos-Concio; Malou N. Santos
- Starring: Claudine Barretto; Rio Locsin; Diether Ocampo; Lito Pimentel; John Estrada; Sharmaine Arnaiz
- Cinematography: Joe Tutanes (segment "Inay, May Momo!"); Ricardo Jacinto (segment "Balintuwad")
- Edited by: Joyce Bernal
- Music by: Nonong Buencamino
- Production company: Star Cinema
- Release date: May 14, 1997
- Running time: 132 minutes
- Country: Philippines
- Language: Tagalog

In 1997, Star Cinema released a film adaptation of the show. It starred Diether Ocampo and Claudine Barretto in the "Balintuwad" (Upside Down) episode directed by Laurenti Dyogi, while John Estrada, Sharmaine Arnaiz and Cris Villanueva starred in "Inay, May Momo" (Mother, There's a Ghost) episode directed by Michael de Mesa.

== Weekly series of Calvento Files ==
Episode No.	Title	Starring
1	"Oroquieta Massacre"	Carmina Villarroel, Eric Quizon, Gina Pareño, Sylvia Sanchez, Jeffrey Santos, Perla Bautista, Anita Linda, Pen Medina, Jan Marini, Menggie Cobarubbias
2	Litam-Jarcia Double Murder Case	Romnick Sarmenta, Rochelle Barrameda, Cris Villanueva, Timi Diwa, Mikee Villanueva, Mia Pratts, Melissa Mendez, Glenda Garcia, Ramil Rodriguez, Marita Zobel
3	Glamour Girl in the World of Crime	Eula Valdez, Ray Ventura, Maila Gumila, Gloria Sevilla, John Lapus, Agatha Tapan, Edgar Mande
4	Sex Slave Sweethearts	Sheryl Cruz, Aljon Jimenez, Caridad Sanchez, Lucita Soriano, Maureen Mauricio, Carlo Aquino, Toby Alejar
5	A Not So Perfect Crime (Apple Lam and Andy Yip Story)	Raymond Bagatsing, Mark Gil, Cherry Pie Picache, Pamela delos Santos, Shintaro Valdez, Alexander Chua, Catherine Lim, Richard King, Carol Dauden
6	I Killed My Son	Jean Garcia, Ricky Davao, Susan Africa, Vivian Foz, Janice Jurado, Raffy Bonanza, Augusto Victa, Shiela Ysrael, Guila Alvarez
7	The Strange Death of Virgillo Santos (aka Spiderman)	Rita Avila, Gardo Versoza, Juan Rodrigo, Rachel Lobangco, Dexter Doria, Perla Bautista, Lovely Rivero, Luz Fernandez, Anna Feliciano, Pocholo Montes
8	Please Stop My Husband's Wedding	Jennifer Mendoza,William Martinez, Maritez Samson, Toni Angeles, Yayo Aguila, Marilyn Villamayor
9	Father, Leave Us Alone	Jestoni Alarcon, G. Toengi, Charlie Davao, Sylvia Sanchez, Rosemarie Gil, Shintaro Valdez, Erika Fife, Dante Castro
10	The Domeng Valdez Story (Sikatuna Massacre)	Jolina Magdangal, Noel Trinidad, Stefano Mori, Mon Confiado, Diego Garcia
11	Paranaque Massacre	Niño Muhlach, Boy2 Quizon, Alicia Alonzo, Kevin Delgado, Allan Bautista, Lito Legaspi, Jordan Castillo, Richard Merck
12	The Rape of Rosalie [aka Rosalie]	Carol Banawa, Pilar Pilapil, Tina Paner, Katya Santos, Teresa Loyzaga, Mon Recto, Tommy Abuel
13	Japino	Jaclyn Jose, Boots Anson-Roa, Dick Israel, Eva Darren, Kristine Garcia, Kate Gomez, Anne Villegas
14	Homicide Maniac [aka Blood Thirsty]	Julio Diaz, Mia Pratts, Allan Paule, Bing Davao, Leni Santos, Tess Dumpit, Eva Darren, Mon Recto, Nante Montereal, Johnny Vicar, Joanne Quintas
15	Areola Tragedy (Liliw Massacre)	Gina Alajar, Angelica Panganiban, Emilio Garcia, Bianca Aguilar, Michael de Mesa, Yda Yaneza, Raquel Montesa
16	Incest [aka Family Affair]	Kaye Abad, Elizabeth Oropesa, Dexter Doria, Ces Quezada, Phillip Gamboa, Danny Cruz
17	Mga Biktima ng Ozone	Diether Ocampo, Marvin Agustin, Lito Legaspi, Chuck Dreyfus, Jeffrey Hidalgo, Ryan Ostrea, Elaine Gil, Rubi Rosa, Alicia Alonzo, Eva Darren, Lorlie Villanueva, Ramil Rodriguez
18	Prelude to a Robbery	Jaclyn Jose, Marilyn Villamayor, Ilonah Jean, Lorenzo Mara, Vivian Foz, Don Umali, Joji Isla, Lora Luna, Ana Feliciano
19	A Widow's String of Tragedies	Marianne dela Riva, Bembol Roco, Robert Arevalo, CJ Ramos, Ryan Soler, Val Iglesia, Archie Adamos
20	Another Case of Child Abuse [aka Another Case of Child Neglect]	Paolo Contis, Eula Valdez, Janice Jurado, Mylene Dizon, Mike Magat, Maila Gumila, Malou de Guzman, Tom Olivar
21	Death in the Hands of Very Own Sister	Rustom Padilla, Sylvia Sanchez, Perla Bautista, Kate Gomez, Luigi Alvarez, Charlie Davao, Empress Schuck, Celine Lirio, Jackie Lou Blanco, Ama Quiambao, Tita de Villa
22	No Bars For Love	Ariel Rivera, Jean Garcia, Lito Legaspi, Marissa Delgado, Ramil Rodriguez, Nante Montereal, Alicia Alonzo
23	Doctor, Why My Son?	Janice de Belen, Gloria Sevilla, Allan Paule, Emman Abeleda, Mon Confiado, Noel Colet, Troy Martino, Gino Padilla, Aida Espiritu, Rossana Jover, Mon Recto, Leilani Navarro, Gen. Romeo Peña
24	Pedophilia [aka Pervert]	Elizabeth Oropesa, Camille Velasco, Allan Paule, Eagle Riggs, Kristoff Peralta, Minnie Aguilar, Suzette Ranillo
25	Ruben Ablaza: The Untold Story	Emilio Garcia, Carmi Martin, Anita Linda, Mikee Villanueva, Richard Arellano, Fredmoore Delos Santos, Lindsay Custodio, Orestes Ojeda,
26	Letters From The Dead (The Alex Duran Story)	Michael Rivero, Robert Arevalo, PJ Abellana, Jeffrey Santos, Marita Zobel, Lovely Rivero, Nikka Valencia, Maureen Mauricio, Joed Serrano
27	Apache Gang	Anton Bernardo, Gina Alajar, Bembol Roco, Chuck Dreyfus, Ruben Manahan, Gino Paul de Guzman, Guila Alvarez, Luigi Alvarez, Popo Lontoc, Boogie Bugayong, Dale Villar
28	Kuwarto o Kuwatro?	Ricky Davao, Dexter Doria, Lito Legaspi, Raquel Villavicencio, Jason Javelona, Glydel Mercado, Roxy Liquigan
29	In the Company of Sharks	Wowie de Guzman, Marvin Agustin, Manjo del Mundo, Joji Isla, Raquel Montesa, Danny Cruz, Anne Villegas, Evelyn Vargas,
30	Aswang	Gloria Diaz, Bunny Paras, Anita Linda, Dan Fernando, Perla Bautista, Ricardo Cepeda, Diego Castro, Yda Yanesa, Gandong Cervantes
31	You Are Never Safe	Charito Solis, Eric Quizon, Timi Diwa, Paolo Delgado, Raffy Bonanza, Bernadette Tongco, Jake Joson, Sylvia Sanchez, Aljon Jimenez, Melissa Mendez, Eva Darren, Allan Paule
32	A Leap of Faith, A Leap to Death (Elisa Salem Story)	Cherry Pie Picache, Lito Legaspi, Emilio Garcia, Beverly Salviejo, Marita Zobel, Malou Crisologo, Tony Angeles
33	Mysterious Formula of Death (Maria Victoria Suller Case Story)	Kris Aquino, Jennifer Mendoza, Kier Legaspi, Teresa Loyzaga, Mel Kimura, Romeo Rivera, Bong Regala, Joe Jardy
34	My Father, My Killer	Janice de Belen, Jean Garcia
35	Too Much Love Kills	Eula Valdez, Dan Fernandez, Lovely Rivero, Piolo Pascual, Marilyn Villamayor, Ray Ventura
36	The Age of Innocence and Death	Juan Rodrigo, Sylvia Sanchez, Eagle Riggs, Carlo Aquino, Pocholo Montes, Alwyn Uytingco
37	Doomed Love Affair	Romnick Sarmenta, Via Veloso, Pinky Amador
38	33 Feet Under	Susan Africa, Carol Banawa, Blue de Leon, Eva Darren, Pen Medina, Tiya Pusit
39	Luneta Gang Wars: Hell In The Heart of Manila	Alicia Alonzo, Jan Marini Alano, Lee Robin Salazar, Nikka Valencia, Jane Zaleta, JR Herrera, Kristoffer Peralta
40	Madam Auring: Misfortunes of a Fortune Teller	Rustom Padilla, Charito Solis, Rochelle Barrameda
41	Klepto	Jolina Magdangal, Marvin Agustin, Maila Gumila, Ray Ventura, Mat Ranillo III, Maureen Mauricio, Bong Regala, Mel Kimura, Ana Feliciano
42	Knock Out by Faith	Leandro Baldemor, Lito Legaspi, Val Iglesias, Suzette Ranillo, Tom Olivar, Marc Solis, John Patrick Recio
43	Affair with a Homosexual	Jon Santos, Caridad Sanchez, Cherry Pie Picache, Lito Pimentel, Elaine Quemuel
44-45	Tracking Down a Train of Truth, Lies and Blood	Diether Ocampo, Cris Villanueva, Bembol Roco, Teresa Loyzaga, Fredmoore Delos Santos, Luz Fernandez
46	First Year Anniversary Special	[No casts in this episode]
47	Faith Kills	Michael de Mesa, Diego Castro, Alma Moreno
48	In The Hands of God	Ricky Davao, Rustom Padilla, Amy Austria
49	A Friend to the Very End	Isko Moreno, Gio Alvarez, Pocholo Montes, Marita Zobel, Ricky Belmonte, DJ Durano
50	Tragicula (Ellen Cañete Story)	Jean Saburit, Raymond Bagatsing, Marita Zobel, Pinky Amador, Shiela Ysrael, Sunshine Dizon
51	From Abu Dhabi: Love & Death	Gloria Sevilla, Manilyn Reynes, Jan Marini, Rez Cortez, Suzette Ranillo,
52	Lorena: Death Journey	Michael Roy Jornales, Via Veloso, Lee Robin Salazar, Perla Bautista, Charlie Davao, Maila Gumila
53	Silang Massacre	Mel Kimura, Joel Torre, Gina Alajar, Jeffrey Hidalgo, Pocholo Montes, Lucita Soriano
54	Biography of a Devil's Soldier	Ramil Rodriguez, Jean Garcia, Marissa Delgado, Kristine Garcia, Jay Manalo, Eva Darren
55	Trick of Gold	Toby Alejar, Daniel Fernando, Cherry Pie Picache, Aljon Jimenez, Laura Hermosa, Glenda Garcia, Piolo Pascual, Gandong Cervantes, Elaine Quemuel, Gio Marcelo
56	Joy: In Love and Pain	TBA
57	Of Debts and Deaths	TBA
58	The Wedding That Never Was	Eula Valdez, Ricky Davao, Jeffrey Santos, Ogie Diaz
58	Valenzuela Cop: Executed Inside The Police Station	Marita Zobel, Ray Ventura, Karla Estrada, Gary Estrada
59	Blood Ties	Rita Avila, Tommy Abuel, Mat Ranillo III, Gloria Sevilla
60	Against God's Will (Rizal Case Under)	Isko Moreno, Anna Capri, Gina Pareño, Maricel Morales, Richard Arellano, Michelle Ayalde, Fredmoore delos Santos, Lucita Soriano, Kathleen Hermosa, Aurora Halili, Tiya Pusit, Rubi Rosa, Celine Lirio, Errol Dionisio
61 (1/2)	To Love is To Die	Piolo Pascual, Nonie Buencamino, Kristine Hermosa, Elizabeth Oropesa, Gino Paul Guzman, Reuben Manahan, Nante Montereal, Alma Lerma, Gerald Faizan
61 (2/2)	Fury of an Old Man	Stefano Mori, Carlo Aquino, Michael Roy Journales, Bembol Roco, Susan Africa, Miguel Vera, Alwyn Uytingco, Doods Peralejo, Naty Mallari, JR Trinidad, Koko Trinidad
62	Angel Housed In Hell	Jennifer Mendoza, Isabel Granada, Sylvia Sanchez, Pen Medina, Katya Santos, Nikki Valdez, Luz Fernandez, Corrine Lirio, Bea Lopez
63	When Love Kills	Ara Mina, John Arcilla, Lorli Villanueva, Toby Alejar, Tony Angeles, Joy Viado, Maureen Mauricio
64	Hatred Runs in the Blood	Princess Punzalan, Ernie Garcia, Noel Trinidad, Jaime Fabregas, Ces Quesada, Allan Paule, Minnie Aguilar, Jojo Abellana, Ryan Soler, Ester Chavez, Yda Yanesa, Troy Martino, Randy Ranay
65	Teenage Sex Slave [aka Teenage Slave]	Jean Garcia, Suzette Ranillo, Mia Gutierrez, Alex Chua, Edgar Allan Yu, Richard King, Winnie Cordero, Steven Alonzo, Rosanna Jover, Tita de Villa, Carol Banawa
66	Dare Not To Sin	Teresa Loyzaga, Pinky Amador, Juan Rodrigo, Ricky Davao, Julio Diaz, Perla Bautista, Sarah Jane Abad, Pocholo Montes, Lindo Obach, Mel Kimura, Sharmaine Nueros, Stella Cañete, Alexis Rustaquio, Robi Rosa
67	Behind the Mask is the Face of a Killer	Mumay Santiago, Emilio Garcia, Spanky Manikan, Efren Reyes, Jan Marini, Dexter Doria, Mon Confiado
68	Savage Murder of Maria Teresa Solante	Mylene Dizon, Tommy Abuel, Mike Magat, Dante Rivero, Mia Pratts, Mely Tagasa, Eva Darren, Raquel Montesa, Nante Montreal, Archie Adamos, Sarji Ruiz
69	Heart Over Brain	Elizabeth Oropesa, Ricky Belmonte, Lito Pimentel, Sherilyn Reyes, JR Herrera, Dennis Baltazar, Gerard Faizan, Bong Regala, Errol Dionisio
70	Greed Breeds Death	Gina Pareño, Eula Valdez, Marita Zobel, Beverly Vergel, Daniel Fernando, Luigi Alvarez, Toby Alejar, Tom Olivar, Marites Samson
71	Family of the Damned	Janice de Belen, Gardo Versoza, Lucita Soriano, Francis Enriquez, Estrella Kuenzler, Alwyn Uytingco, Stella Cañete, Kjell Villamarin
72	A Septic Tank For A Coffin	Gio Alvarez, Caridad Sanchez, Noel Trinidad, Rannie Raymundo, Kaye Abad, Nikki Valdez, Gerard Pizzaras, Tiya Pusit, Jason San Pedro, Miguel dela Rosa, Marga Madrillizo
73	A Newspaperman's Deadline (Danny Hernandez Murder)	Joel Torre, Nonie Buencamino, Joji Isla, Val Iglesia, Miguel Vera, Troy Martino, Raffy Bonanza, Dandin Ranillo, Gammy Viray (as Tony Calvento)
74	Twisted and Dead (Murder at the Asylum)	Cherry Pie Picache, Bembol Roco, Glenda Garcia, Lora Luna, Encar Benedicto, Ester Chavez, Manjo del Mundo, Dante Castro, Lorenzo Mara, Tom Olivar, Cris Daluz, Emman Esturco
75	A Life For The Price of Karma	Rita Avila, Aljon Jimenez, Lito Legaspi, Alicia Alonzo, Amado Cortez, Mia Gutierrez, Mel Feliciano, Bing Davao, Laura Hermosa, Celine Lirio, Nica Peralejo, Paolo Zobel
76	Prodigal Mother	Pinky de Leon, Tommy Abuel, Farrah Florer, Kristine Hermosa, Tanya Garcia, Arlene Tolibas, Suzette Ranillo, Nante Montreal, Dexter Doria
77	Goodbye to a Cruel World (The Story of Paulyn Lacson)	Ricky Davao, Lorena Garcia, Timmy Cruz, Corrine Lirio, Mel Kimura, Missy King, Juni Ranillo
78	I Saw Them Kill, Jetjet (an eyewitness account of the Sitaw Boy Murder)	Gina Alajar, Ronnie Lazaro, Rez Cortez, Carlo Aquino, Ray Ventura, Lawrence David, Michael Roy Journales, Leonardo David, Yda Yanesa
79	Rumors, Facts & Murder	Jennifer Mendoza, Joel Torre, Ces Quesada, Pen Medina, Sherilyn Reyes, Beverly Salviejo, Gemma Gonzales, Engie Allarey
80	Her Master's Victim: The Agony and Death of a Slave	Kathleen Hermosa, Kristine Garcia, Lorli Villanueva, Anita Linda, Perla Bautista, Glenda Garcia, Rossana Jover, Richard Quan, Dennis Baltazar, Crispin Pineda, Alfred Manalo, Rodney Shattara
81	In the Mind and In the Womb of a Miserable Child	Hilda Koronel, Tanya Garcia, Tommy Abuel, Lito Legaspi, Suzette Ranillo, Luz Fernandez, Mel Kimura, Raquel Montesa
82	Sacrificial Lamb	Caridad Sanchez, Raymond Keannu, Gerard Pizzaras, Maila Gumila, Brandon Legaspi, Melissa Mendez, Bong Regala, Jake Joson, Sharmaine Nueros
83	Dying Young But Not In Vain	Romnick Sarmenta, Mumay Santiago, Michael Roy Journales, Augusto Victa, Eva Darren, Maureen Mauricio, Allan Paule, Joji Isla, Lora Luna
84	Vengeance Behind a Slaughter	Jestoni Alarcon, Rita Magdalena, Roi Rodrigo, Amado Cortez, Robert Ortega, Dexter Doria, Andrea del Rosario
85	Woman in the Life of a Murder Victim	Tirso Cruz III, Gardo Versoza, Ana Marin, Lee Robin Salazar, Errol Dionisio, Encar Benedicto, JR Herrera, Dante Castro, Lucy Quinto
86	Killer Maid	Kris Aquino, Elizabeth Oropesa, Juan Rodrigo, Luis Ortega, Maritez Samson, Lawrence David, Luigi Alvarez, Cheska Garcia, Alwyn Uytingco, Richard Arellano, Alma Lerma, Kristopher Peralta, Ihman Esturco, Anna Feliciano, Mosang, Dan Fernandez
87	He Who Died in His Hearse	Ray Ventura, Ana Capri, Ian Veneracion, Tiya Pusit, Matutina, Vivian Foz, Allan Bautista, Bernard Palanca, Don Umali, Don Laurel, Aurora Halili, Gino Paul Guzman
88	Between Flesh & Blood Lies the Evil	Cherry Pie Picache, Pen Medina, Dianne dela Fuente, Corrine Lirio, Katrina de Leon, Anne Villegas, Lucita Soriano
89	Fatal Lesson	Rustom Padilla, Anna Larrucea, Sharmaine Suarez, Paula Peralejo, Allan Paule, Suzette Ranillo, Troy Martino, Lorna Lopez, Bing Davao, Bea Lopez, Michelle Ayalde, Celine Lirio
90	Against the Power and Paranoia of a Cop	Bojo Molina, Joel Torre, Kier Legaspi, Kristine Garcia, Lara Morena, Gerard Pizaras, Ryan Soler, Fredmoore delos Santos, Armand de Guzman, Junie Ranillo
91	Betrayed By Her Bestfriend	Nikki Valdez, Elizabeth Oropesa, Dante Rivero, Monina Bagatsing, Don Laurel, Corine Mendez, Rosanna Jover, Sharmaine Nueros
92	Pregnant and Headless	Manilyn Reynes, Aljon Jimenez, Lucita Soriano, Eva Darren, Errol Dionisio, Wendy Villacorta, Mel Kimura, Gandong Cervantes
93	Deadly Dancing (A Gruesome Finale)	Jennifer Mendoza, Ricky Davao, Eva Darren, Maureen Mauricio, Lito Legaspi, Rosanna Jover, Dennis Baltazar, Jeanette Torres, Elaine Quemuel
94	A Drum Is Her Dead Baby Cradle	Janice de Belen, Eula Valdez, Ronnie Quizon, Chris Daluz, Jake Garcia, Allan Paule
95	Carnal Zone	Isko Moreno, Gardo Versoza, Princess Punzalan, Via Veloso, Luigi Alvarez, Maritez Samson, Pocholo Montes, Yda Yaneza, Tiya Pusit, Jun Dominador, Aldwin Huvalla
96	Maniacal Lies	Caridad Sanchez, Ana Capri, Emilio Garcia, Maria Isabel Lopez, Mon Confiado, Lawrence David, Roi Rodrigo, Connie Chua, Stella Cañete, Crispin Pineda
97	A Wife's Prayer, A Mother's Plea	Gina Alajar, Romnick Sarmenta, Jennifer Sevilla, Jeffrey Santos, Gerard Pizarras, Berting Labra, Gerry Oliva, Aurora Halili, Louie Villaruz
98	The Living Dead	Boots Anson-Roa, Gary Estrada, Cherry Pie Picache, Candy Pangilinan, Lee Robin Salazar, JR Herrera, Arman de Guzman, Marcus Madrigal, Lorie Cortez, Froilan Sales
99	Breaking Hearts, Bleeding Hearts	Raymond Bagatsing, Sylvia Sanchez, Sharmaine Suarez, Spanky Manikan, Sherry Lara, Lucy Quintos, Fernando Montenegro, Arlene Tolibas, Gandong Cervantes
100	A Wolf in Sheep's Clothing	Rio Locsin, Aljon Jimenez, Atong Redillas, Jackie Aquino, Johnny Vicar, Carmen Ronda, Marilyn Villamayor, Engie Allarey
101	Criminal Encounters of a Strange Sex [aka Encounters of a Homosexual]	Wowie de Guzman, Lorena Garcia, Perla Bautista, Malou de Guzman, Maureen Mauricio, Joji Isla, Ricky Rivero, Erwin Pineda, Wendy Villacorta, Lora Luna, Sharmaine Nueros, Joi Nicolas
102	His End is the Beginning of Justice	John Arcilla, Jennifer Mendoza, Rez Cortez, Ray Ventura, Stella Cañete, Diana Enriquez, Ihman Esturco
103	Bad Blood That Runs in One Vain	Charlie Davao, Bing Davao, Augusto Victa, Ernie Zarate, Anne Villegas, Matutina, Ama Quiambao, Dante Castro, Lui Villaruz, Richard Quan, Nante Montreal
104	The Fires of Hate	Ina Raymundo, Rita Avila, Irma Adlawan, Maureen Mauricio, Dexter Doria, Sherilyn Reyes, Richard Quan, Ruby Rosa, Aurora Veronica, Robert Ortega, Tom Olivar
105	2nd Year Anniversary Special	[No casts in this episode]
106	A Wife's Death Ride	Jacklyn Jose, Kier Legaspi, Evangeline Pascual, Charlie Davao, Perla Bautista, Susan Africa, Alwyn Uytingco, Lora Luna, Dante Castro
107	Children in the Game of Lust [aka Children in the Game of Fire]	Amy Austria, Agatha Tapan, Kaye Abad, Glenda Garcia, Julio Diaz, Rey "PJ" Abellana, Suzette Ranillo, Sarah Jane Abad, Simon Soler, Jason San Pedro, Alfred Manal
108	Bloody End to a Bloody Tragedy (Oroquieta Massacre 2)	Eric Quizon, Dick Israel, William Lorenzo, Menggie Cobarrubias, Pocholo Montes, Marita Zobel
109	Like Animals, Like Slaves	Gio Alvarez, Vivian Foz, Mark Vernal, Bong Regala, Connie Chua, Arman de Guzman, Junie Ranillo, Gerry Olivar, Rodney Shatara, Howard Zaleta
110	Who Lost Thy Honor (Alama Double Murder Case)	Dante Rivero, Eula Valdez, Cris Villanueva, Perla Bautista, Lorli Villanueva, Spanky Manikan, Allan Paule, Maureen Mauricio, Rosanna Jover
111	The Bud and the Beast	Caridad Sanchez
112	Short-lived Life of Eloy	AJ Eigenmann
113	Eve in the Garden of Love and Murder	Teresa Loyzaga
114	The Silent Side of the Accused	Rustom Padilla
115		
116		
117		
118		
119		
120		
121		
122		
123		
124		
125		
126		
127		
128		

== Awards ==
Awards and nominations
Year	Award giving body	Category	Nominated work/ Person	Results
1999	PMPC Star Awards for Movies	New Movie Actress	Mylene Dizon	Won
2000	New York Film Festival	Best Docu-drama	Episode: “Dying Young But Not In Vain”	Won
