= Paano ang Puso Ko? =

- Original theatrical poster of the film
- Directed by: Rory B. Quintos
- Screenplay by: Ces Quesada
- Story by: Mari L. Mariano; Tammy Bejerano; Raymond Lee
- Produced by: Charo Santos-Concio; Malou N. Santos
- Starring: Judy Ann Santos; Wowie De Guzman; Rico Yan
- Cinematography: Joe Tutanes
- Edited by: Jess Navarro
- Music by: Nonong Buencamino
- Production company: Star Cinema
- Distributed by: Star Cinema
- Release date: February 12, 1997
- Running time: 116 minutes
- Country: Philippines
- Languages: Filipino; English

Paano ang Puso Ko? (lit. 'What About My Heart?') is a 1997 Filipino romantic comedy-drama film directed by Rory B. Quintos from a screenplay by Ces Quesada and story written by Mari L. Mariano, Tammy Bejerano, and Raymond Lee. The film stars Judy Ann Santos, Wowie De Guzman, and Rico Yan, with the supporting cast including Dante Rivero, Daria Ramirez, Dexter Doria, Lito Legaspi, and Marita Zobel.

Produced and distributed by Star Cinema, it was theatrically released in the Philippines on February 12, 1997. In 2018, the film was digitally restored and remastered in 4K resolution by ABS-CBN Film Restoration, in partnership with Central Digital Lab.

== Plot ==
Ruben (Wowie De Guzman) and Cecile (Judy Ann Santos) are childhood friends. One day, Ruben's cousin Jason (Rico Yan), returns from the United States. He meets Cecile, and the two fall in love despite their different backgrounds. Only then does Ruben realize that he too is in love with Cecile. However, Jason has a secret that may destroy his relationship with Cecile and Ruben.

As time passes, Jason admits his love for Cecile and the two become a couple. However, Ruben also plans to state his love for Cecile and brings her a flower as a statement of his love. Cecile says that she is in a relationship with Jason and Ruben is disappointed; the two cousins have a fight.

Cecile's father does not like Jason, and thus physically attacks him. Jason is traumatized and falls ill, then secretly leaves the Philippines, knowing that he can die of his illness at any moment. Months later, Jason returns, only to die shortly afterward. After Jason's death, Ruben and Cecile become a couple.

== Full cast and characters ==
=== Main cast ===
- Judy Ann Santos as Cecille
- Wowie De Guzman as Ruben
- Rico Yan as Jason

=== Supporting cast ===
- Dante Rivero as Renato
- Daria Ramirez as Elisa
- Lito Legaspi as Cesar
- Dexter Doria as Cita
- Marita Zobel as Pilar
- Vangie Labalan as Lola Simang
- Karl Angelo Legaspi as Jojo
- Korinne Lirio as Neneng
- Jefferson Long as Marlon
- Tak Barrios as Daday
- Tony Gata as Jason's Driver
- Loida Juego as Aling Loida
- Ric Sagum

== Production ==
=== Filming locations ===
Filming took place primarily within the province of Batangas in the Philippines. In specific, they captured the countryside in the towns of Laurel and Tanauan. The team had to show farmlands and people plowing on the field where the characters Cecille and Ruben were born. The production crew also filmed at the Enchanted Kingdom amusement park in Santa Rosa, Laguna, where the characters Cecille and Jason visit and date in the film.

=== Music ===
The film's titular theme song "Paano ang Puso Ko" was penned by Roberto Rigor and performed by April Boy Regino. The song was adapted from Chuck Willis' "What Am I Living For", composed by Fred Jay and Art Harris.

== Reception ==
=== Box office ===
Before the film's release, the pairing of Santos and de Guzman was proven to be successful for audiences. Paano Ang Puso Ko? marked the sixth time (including minor roles) they had partnered in a film after the success of their first team-up in ABS-CBN's longest soap opera Mara Clara, which ended on February 14 (Valentine's Day, two days after the movie was released) and later the premiering of Esperanza on February 17 the following week. In addition, de Guzman was already popular during that time as a performer of Universal Motion Dancers (UMD), a dancing group in the Philippines. It also marks Yan's first film role with Santos after working together in the teen drama series Gimik. Nevertheless, their combination was also popular during that time. The film was a box-office success.

=== Critical response ===
Aside from its commercial success, the film received favorable reviews. Leah Castaneda of the Manila Standard newspaper noted:

I like Judy Ann when she was still in her Wowie de Guzman/Rico Yan phase. I watched her movies and thought, 'Now, here's a good actress'. Her being natural and effortless impressed me. She was convincing in her roles as an unassuming probinsyana gifted with a golden heart and impeccable comedic timing. I enjoyed how she seemed to forever irritate Wowie and how she managed to capture Rico's heart, if only on the silver screen...

== Awards ==
Year	Award-Giving Body	Category	Recipient	Result
1998	FAMAS Awards	Best Actor	Wowie De Guzman	Nominated
1998	FAMAS Awards	Best Child Actor	Karl Angelo Legaspi	Nominated
1998	FAMAS Awards	German Moreno Youth Achievement Award	Judy Ann Santos	Won
