= Jan Marini =

Filipino actress and singer

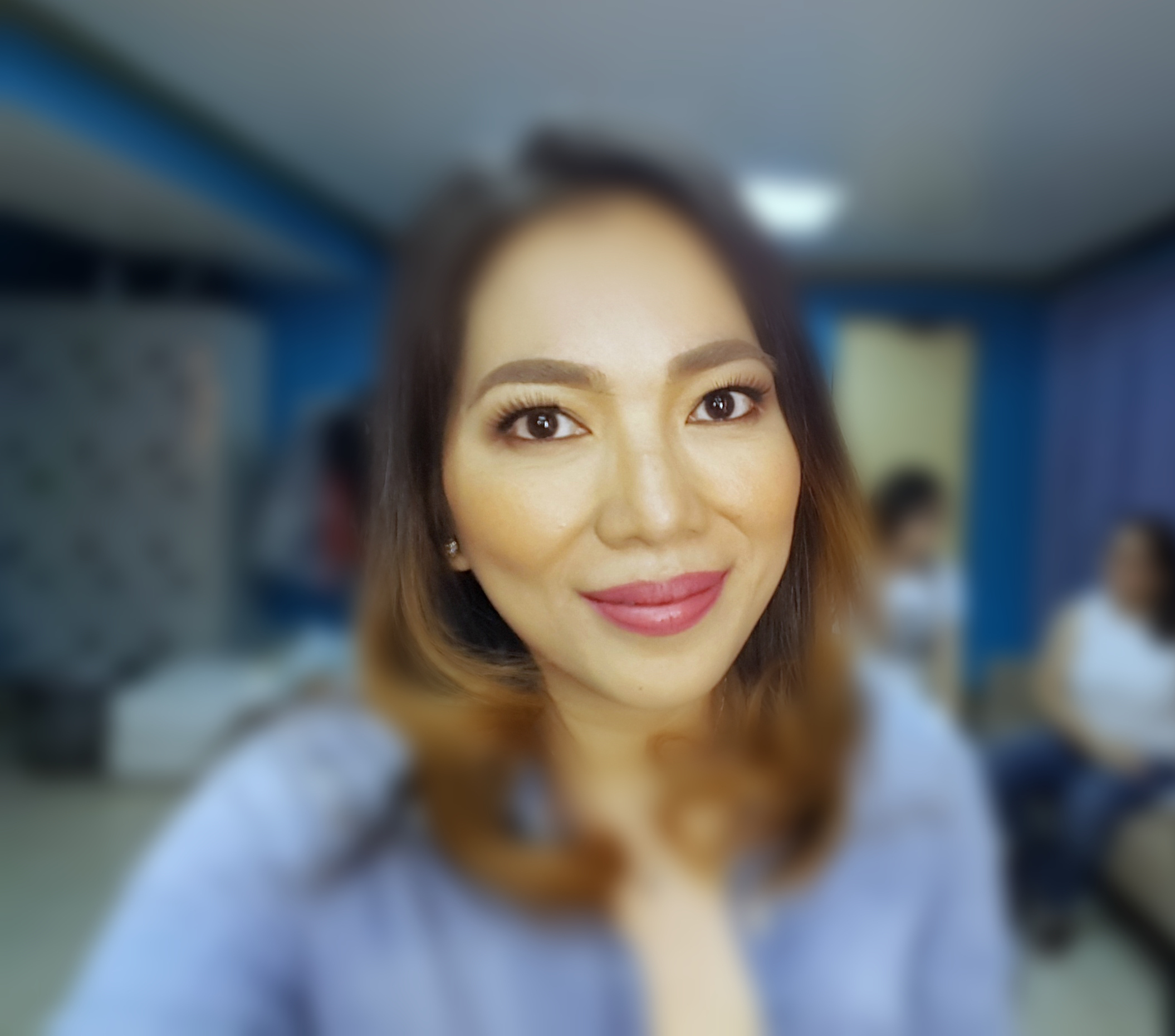
- Born: Jan Marini Alano; August 12, 1978 (age 48); Manila, Philippines
- Other name: Jan Marini Pizarras
- Occupations: Actress, singer, blogger
- Years active: 1992–present
- Political party: PDP-Laban (c. 2019)
- Spouse: Gerard Pizarras
- Children: Brianna Laney, Raine Jarvis

Jan Marini Alano (born August 12, 1978) is an actress and singer from the Philippines.

== Life and career ==
Marini started her showbiz career as one of the resident singers on Ang TV, ABS-CBN's teen-oriented gag/variety show in the early 1990s. She subsequently appeared on various other television variety shows. She released her eponymous debut album in 1995 with the single "Love Song". She was included in the cast of the original soap Mula sa Puso as the lead's best friend. Her appearance in the series paved the way for Jan to play different roles in numerous drama series and specials of the two major networks. She has also appeared in several mainstream and indie films throughout her career. Jan has also performed live at music bars in the Metro. In late 2010, Jan released her sophomore album Once, containing 11 tracks, both cover versions and originals, two of which were written by Marini, including the carrier single "White Walls". Her most recent regular appearance for TV was for ABS-CBN's Pangako Sa 'Yo.

== Personal life ==
Marini took a break from years of TV work and singing engagements to build a family with fellow actor Gerard Pizarras. The couple met on the set of the ABS-CBN TV series Mula Sa Puso, where they played an onscreen couple. After dating for three years, the couple married on May 7, 2000. Together they have two kids; Brianna (born 2001) and Raine (born 2006).

== Discography ==
Year	Album	Songs
1994	Ang TV: The Album	Ang TV Theme (ATV cast); Kahiyaan Lang
1994	Ang TV: The Christmas Album	Silent Night (with Gio Alvarez, Roselle Nava, Victor Neri, Lindsay Custodio and Alfred Manal); Ang Aking Pamasko (with Lindsay Custodio, Susan Hosseinzadeh, Jessirene Dominguez and Lailani Navarro)
1995	Jan Marini	Sa Unang Tingin; Love Song; Because I Understand; Pakiusap; Now I Know Why; Ngayong Kapiling Ka; Kung Tunay Pa; Give It Time; If; New Life in Him
2010	Once	The Same Love; Once; Maari Ba; White Walls; Just When I Needed You Most; Paano Na; The Hardest Thing; Do You Love Me; Pagdating Ng Bukas; So Done; Will You Still Love Me

== Filmography ==
=== Movies ===
Year	Title	Character/Role
1995	Sana Maulit Muli	Melissa
1997	Flames: The Movie	Aida
1998	Dahil Mahal na Mahal Kita	Jam
1999	Mula sa Puso: the Movie	Mariel
2005	Bilog	Karina
2008	Ate	
2015	The Breakup Playlist	Adi

=== Television ===
Year	Title	Character/Role	Notes
1992	Ang TV	Herself	
1992	Ready, Get Set, Go	Herself/Guest	
1992	Mr. Kupido		"I'll Be There"
1992	Sa Linggo nAPO Sila	Herself	
1995	'Sang Linggo nAPO Sila	Herself	
1995	Star Drama Presents	Unknown	*Appeared in several episodes
1996	Flames	Unknown	*Appeared in several episodes
1996	Viva Spotlight	Unknown	*Appeared in a few episodes
1996	Calvento Files	Unknown	*Appeared in a few episodes
1997	Mula sa Puso	Mariel	
2002	Kahit Kailan	Tuding	
2004	Leya, ang Pinakamagandang Babae sa Ilalim ng Lupa	Delia	
2004	Magpakailanman		*Appeared in few episodes
2004	Te Amo, Maging Sino Ka Man	Letty	
2007	MariMar	DSWD officer	
2007	Impostora	Gemma	
2008	Sine Novela: Gaano Kadalas Ang Minsan?	Barbara	
2008	Maalaala Mo Kaya		"Lupa"
2009	Maalaala Mo Kaya	Maria Christina "Maricris" Viceral	"Bola"
2009	May Bukas Pa	Fely Aragon	
2009	Paano Ba ang Mangarap?	Gemma Estrella	
2010	Beauty Queen		
2010	Pilyang Kerubin	Marissa	
2010	Bantatay	Charlene	
2010	Mara Clara	Virginia/Barang	
2011	Magic Palayok		
2011–2012	Kung Aagawin Mo ang Langit	Sonia Tercero	
2011	Spooky Nights: Sumpa		
2012	Biritera	Mariel Arcega	
2012–2013	Sana ay Ikaw na Nga	Consuelo Villavicer	
2013	Magpakailanman: The Louise de los Reyes Story	Elvie Perido	
2013–2014	Honesto	Rebecca	
2014–2015	Strawberry Lane	Rebecca "Bebs" Rosales	
2015	Flordeliza	Joan	
2015	Pangako Sa 'Yo	Lourdes Magbanua Buenavista	
2015	FPJ's Ang Probinsyano	PO3 Maricel Marquez	
2016	Wansapanataym		
2016	Pepito Manaloto		
2017	Trops	Ces	
2017	Daig Kayo ng Lola Ko	Cathy	Episode: Ang Alamat Ng Durian
2020	Paano Kita Mapasasalamatan	Donna Garcia	
2022	Abot-Kamay na Pangarap	Kapitana Denoy	
2023	Tadhana: Penitensya	Mirasol	
2024	Makiling	Prof. Nora Asero	

=== Internet ===
Year	Title	Character/Role
2019	The Jack Logan Show: #CoffeeAndPolitics	Herself
