= Esperanza (Philippine TV series) =

1997–99 Philippine television drama series

- Title card
- Genre: Drama
- Written by: Dado C. Lumibao; Wali Ching; Reggie Amigo
- Directed by: Jerry Lopez Sineneng; Rory B. Quintos; Don M. Cuaresma
- Creative director: Don Miguel Cuaresma
- Starring: Judy Ann Santos
- Theme music composer: Vehnee Saturno
- Opening theme: "Esperanza" by April Boy Regino
- Country of origin: Philippines
- Original language: Tagalog (Filipino)
- No. of seasons: 2
- No. of episodes: 627

Production
- Executive producer: Marinella Bandelaria-Bravo
- Editors: Ben Panaligan; Mel Fernandez
- Running time: 15-30 minutes
- Production company: Star Creatives

Original release
- Network: ABS-CBN
- Release: February 17, 1997 – July 30, 1999

Esperanza is a Philippine television drama series broadcast by ABS-CBN. Directed by Jerry Lopez Sineneng, Rory B. Quintos and Don M. Cuaresma, it stars Judy Ann Santos in the title role. It aired on the network's evening line up from February 17, 1997 to July 30, 1999, replacing Mara Clara and was replaced by Labs Ko Si Babe.

This series is streaming online on YouTube.

== Premise ==
=== Beginning of the story ===
The series starts on Isabel's (Charo Santos) trip with her three children to Manila to transfer to their new home. They rode on a bus but were involved in an accident. Isabel's children were saved before the bus exploded. Juan (Dante Rivero), who returned from his work abroad, was devastated by what happened. He believed that his wife and children died but the authorities could not find their bodies.

The three siblings survive, but due to their very young age, with nothing to identify them, they are adopted by families in the same neighborhood.

The eldest Socorro is renamed Esperanza (Judy Ann Santos) by a poor couple, Celia (Sylvia Sanchez) and Raul (Joel Torre), who takes her in but never tells her she is adopted. She grows up in this environment where she is mistreated or ignored by her adoptive illiterate mother, Celia, and yet sees her lavish attention towards her own children JunJun (Emman Abeleda) and Andrea (Tanya Garcia). Esperanza's only bright moment while growing up is spending time with her childhood friend, and later her sweetheart, Anton (Wowie de Guzman).

Raphael (Marvin Agustin), Esperanza's younger brother, is more fortunate. He is rescued by another poor family: Ester (Chat Silayan-Baylon) and Luis (Bembol Roco) who have a son named Noel (Spencer Reyes), and they treat him as if he were their own son. He thrives in the happy and loving environment and is renamed Danilo.

Regina (Angelika Dela Cruz), the youngest of the three siblings, is adopted by a rich couple, Belinda (Teresa Loyzaga) and Mayor Joaquin Montejo (Lito Legaspi) who are childless. They renamed her Cecille. She grows up in wealth but her father secretly beats her.

=== Search for real family ===
While Celia was drunk, she expressed her frustrations by blaming the adoption of Esperanza as a reason of the poverty of their family. As a result, Esperanza learned that she is just an adopted child of the Estrera couple. Later, she learned about her parentage, and sought to find out the truth about her real family. She thought her mother and brother died in the accident, and her adoptive father saved her and youngest sister, Regina, but could not support them both so he gave up Regina to the Montejos. Meanwhile, Raul was falsely accused of killing a man named Ricardo and he was imprisoned. While he was imprisoned, his wife Celia betrayed him and had a relationship with a man named Duarte (Ronnie Lazaro)

Mayor Joaquin Montejo became the most influential person to the life of Esperanza, to the adoptive family of Danilo, and to Anton because of the following reasons: 1. He was the one responsible for making Raul imprisoned for the murder of Ricardo (the lover of Belinda) which was actually planned by the Mayor; 2. It was his right-hand man Delfin (Rez Cortez), the adoptive father of Anton, who killed Ricardo; 3. Danilo witnessed the crime which gave death threats to the family of Luis Miguel; 4. At the later part of the story, he killed Delfin for betraying him; and 5. He destroyed many lives of people to the extent of gaining control of the landless people in the squatters area in Manila.

Esperanza stumbled upon the newspaper article featuring Juan's story about his search for his missing family. Piecing together the information stated in the article fit their story and both realize they are siblings. Esperanza also learned the truth from his adoptive father Raul that Cecille was her sister. She convinced Cecille to join her on searching their biological father. Anton helped Esperanza to escape Cecille from Mayor Joaquin.

=== Life in Metro Manila ===
Esperanza, Anton, and Cecille make their escape from the hands of Mayor Joaquin Montejo and managed to go to Manila where they were orphaned by Lola Pacita (Gloria Sevilla) together with her grandson Carlo in the slum area. It was also the time where Cecil met Buboy (Jericho Rosales). Love and friendship had developed between Cecille and Buboy which made them very close. Esperanza and Cecille were still determined to search for their father but Lola Pacita had premonitions that upon finding their long-lost father, they will experience so much sufferings they never had before. Life was not easy during their stay in Manila which made them experienced the reality of life between rich and poor. However, the siblings were still fortunate to have Lola Pacita, Bayani (Diego Castro), Buboy, and Lolo Cirilo (Amado Cortez) who were on their side at times of happiness and crisis.

In the city, they even experienced bullying from the hands of Oca (Allan Paule), the henchmen of Sargeant Mulong Garido (Val Iglesias), the corrupt policeman assigned in the nearby community where they lived. Luckily, Aling Rita (Ana Capri), the mistress of Mulong, was there to defend them. Many struggles in the city were confronted by the Esperanza, Anton, Buboy, and Cecille together with Lola Pacita which enabled them to escape and transfer to another area in Manila where they found Danilo and his adoptive family who were also living in Manila during that time.

At this point, they learned about their true father Juan Salgado and they find their father but learn that their father remarried his ex fiancé, Sandra (Elizabeth Oropesa). They were reunited with their father but had so much sufferings from the hands of Sandra, her personal assistant Ramona (Mel Kimura), and her daughter from her first husband Paula (Dimples Romana). Juan Salgado did not even defend his daughters against Sandra and Paula which caused extreme regrets and sadness on the part of the Salgado siblings. All these years, Sandra knows his children are alive and has been keeping this secret from him.

The search for the lost brother of Esperanza and Cecille begun as Juan Salgado travelled to San Isidro to investigate. As Esther revealed everything, Danilo now knew the truth that he was the long-lost brother of Cecille and Esperanza. Danilo initially refused to join in Esperanza's search for their father because his heart was with the family who loved him and they were the only family he wanted. Esperanza understood and she went on to tell Cecille the truth, and she begged Esperanza to take her away.

=== Back to the province of Quezon ===
Meanwhile, the Salgado siblings met Emil Peralta (Romnick Sarmienta) and his sister Issa, who opened another life opportunity in the province and brought them to San Miguel where they lived together once again. Without knowing, Emil was the right-hand man of Monica De Dios (Jackielou Blanco), the long-lost friend of their mother Isabel and wealthy administrator of the hacienda owned by Donya Consuelo Bermudez (Rosa Rosal). Emil was secretly tasked by Monica to investigate the whereabouts of the Salgado siblings and bring them to the province to start a new life. The opportunities of living in the province of Quezon enabled the Salgado siblings, Anton and his mother Elena (Melissa Mendez), together with the Miguel family to leave Manila. It was a sad moment of their life that Esperanza and Danilo left their father, their friends, and adoptive grandmother Lola Pacita in the city.

Cecille was once again within custody of her adoptive father Mayor Joaquin Montejo. Through the help of Emil, the company of Buboy, Anton, Danilo, and Noel had work in the field as well as in the hacienda. The siblings did not know that the real person behind helping them to have work and live in the hacienda was no other than their grandmother, Donya Consuelo. New problems on their way were experienced by the siblings while living in the San Miguel province such as the love triangle between Danilo, Noel, and Emil's sister named Issa (Monina Diaz-Bagatsing), the betrayal of Emil to Esperanza and Miguel Family as he connived with Mayor Montejo, the maltreatment and human rights abuses of Duarte to Celia's family, the extra-marital relationship of Raul and Karla (Stella Ruiz White), the revelation of Karla to what happened to Esther during her overseas work, the political struggles and killings during the election, and the adoption of Mayor Joaquin Montejo to Cecille just because Belinda left all her wealth to Cecille according to the last will and testament.

On the meanwhile, the election in the town of San Isidro is approaching. As part of political plan of Mayor Montejo during the campaign period, Raul Estrera was initially released from the imprisonment yet it became an opportunity for Estrera to fight Mayor Montejo in a political campaign after the death of Councilor Martin. Raul Estrera, the adoptive father of Esperanza became the new Mayor of San Isidro. Mayor Montejo faced many charges against him yet he still managed to escape when the police were about to arrest him. Emil, being one of the witnesses, was still imprisoned being an accessory to the crimes committed by Montejo.

=== Revelation in the hacienda and political life ===
Moreover, it was also the time of the golden age of political career for Mayor Raul Estrera while Celia exhibited a character who is hunger for power and fame. Mayor Estrera exhibited an epitome of service-oriented public servant in spite of her wife. Series of political destabilizations happened, caused by the former Mayor Montejo joining forces with the former Vice Mayor Robles and newly appointed Vice Mayor Aguirre. After the election, it was also a turning point wherein they were finally introduced to Monica De Dios (Jackielou Blanco) in the hacienda and she revealed her true identity to help them. Monica's real objective was to reunite the Salgado siblings as secretly instructed by their legitimate grandmother Donya Consuelo (Rosa Rosal).

Sandra and Monica became rivals as they both want to reunite the siblings and take them as their own family. Sandra had diabolic reasons behind this plan and told the siblings that their father Juan was already dead. On the other hand, Monica's plan was genuine but she was not successful for making the siblings reunited in the hacienda due to many struggles and because Esperanza and Danilo did not want to leave their adoptive family who became important part of their lives. It was also revealed that Monica had plans of taking revenge against Sandra because of what happened to her brother, Ramon, the biological father of Paula. Ramon committed suicide after Sandra left him for Juan Salgado. One of the highlights of this story was when Monica fell in loved with Buboy, Cecille's boyfriend.

During the time in the hacienda, a series of life developments happened for Esperanza, Danilo, Cecille, Anton, Buboy, and Noel. Esperanza and Anton were supposed to be engaged but everything in the plan of the two lovers were destroyed by Cristy (Corrine Mendez), the granddaughter of Lola Belen, who also secretly in loved with Anton. The whole fiasco was also plotted by Sandra who paid Cristy just to stop the engagement. Esperanza was really saddened and hurt which made her developed close relationship with Robbie (Dominic Ochoa), the brother of Sandra Salgado. Robbie and Esperanza had relationship yet it did not last long because Robbie died of leukemia. Sandra also believed that Esperanza has to be blamed for not telling the truth behind Robbie's illness. Thus, Anton and Esperanza became more separated from each other due to many problems happened.

=== The test in Bermudez family ===
Cecille's adoptive father Mayor Montejo took the opportunity to capture Cecille once again because of her condition that she was in a state of amnesia. Cecille's health condition and loss of memory was result of an accident during her confrontation with Buboy and her mother Stella (Hilda Koronel). Mayor Joaquin discovers that Anton is his son, a product of rape. He works out a deal to exchange Cecille with Anton. As a result, Mayor Joaquin gave back Cecille to her siblings in the hacienda. This made a conflict between Sandra and Joaquin. Consequently, Sandra felt betrayed and killed Joaquin in a gunshot.

Because of his love for Esperanza, Anton agrees with Esperanza during their emotional conversation and went to America to study and find Karen (Jolina Magdangal), his sister from Joaquin Montejo and Lorena Alonzo (Marianne Dela Riva). It was also in America where Anton met Donna, his future wife.

Donya Consuelo learned what happened in her hacienda from the mayordomo named Lola Belen (Ama Quiambao) and this made her disappointed from Monica's work performance in managing the hacienda and taking care of her grandchildren. This made the rich matriarch came back from the US to reunite with her grandchildren. However, Sandra did all her best to destroy the family of Esperanza. First, Sandra and Celia had connivance to introduce a fake heiress Socorro named Elaine (Jennifer Sevilla) which unfortunately convinced Donya Consuelo. This made Esperanza left the hacienda and search for her mother in Manila. Sandra had tricked Donya Consuelo to gain power over the hacienda and manage all the properties. Sandra treated the Bermudez family, including Luis, Esther, and Noel, as slaves while Esperanza searched for her true mother in Manila.

=== Back to Manila to search for oneself ===
Esperanza finally met Ligaya (Jean Saburit), the prostitute who pretended to be her real mother where in fact she is real mother of Elaine (the fake Socorro). Searching for work due to hardships, Esperanza meets Louie Villareal (Mat Ranillo III), the owner of the flower shop and convenience store where she got employed. He is the father of Donna (later wife of Anton) and the best friend of Dr. Jaime Illustre, who will pave the way for both Isabel and Esperanza to meet personally.

Louie recommended Esperanza to a job as the nurse aid or companion to Isabel Ilustre, Jaime (Tommy Abuel)'s wife. Isabel had suffered a nervous breakdown after she believed her children perished in the bus accident decades ago. Jaime found out the truth between the two but he do not recognize Esperanza as Isabel's daughter. However, the nurse aid formed a bond with Isabel and helped her heal and physically recovered.

Years passed and Esperanza never heard from Anton, except that he is marrying Donna (Beth Tamayo), Louie's daughter who is pregnant with his baby. When they see each other again, Anton attempts to resolve their issues but Esperanza refuses because does not want to hurt Donna. She later changes her mind but it's too late. While working as a servant in the flower shop of Louie, Esperanza meets Brian (Piolo Pascual), a new suitor who was a detective and eventually became her boyfriend later for a short period of time.

Meanwhile, Sandra continued to make the lives of Cecille, Danilo, and the Miguel family a living hell and managed to steal the wealth of Donya Consuelo. She took them to her house to make them her slaves and it was discovered that Sandra and Isabel were half-sisters.

=== Return and reunion in Quezon ===
Fortunately, the Miguel family was saved by Mayor Raul but Sandra did not allow the Bermudez family to leave the hacienda. Later on, Esperanza, with the help of Mayor Raul, saved Donya Consuelo, Danilo and Cecille from the hands of Sandra after she learned that she was the real Socorro and came back to the province with the help of Brian and Mayor Raul. The Bermudez family hired lawyer to regain their hacienda but was killed by Sandra's henchmen.

Louie and Jaime became enemies as the former learned from Donna that the latter had taken Isabel from her true daughter Esperanza. Hence, Louie learned the truth behind Esperanza's identity. Meanwhile, Sandra abducted Donya Consuelo and she let the latter met Isabel, her long lost daughter. They have an emotional reunion but Sandra later brought Donya Consuelo to a far place. Fortunately, the Salgado siblings and Brian found her and they helped her to recover.

Donna learned that her tita Isabel did not love her tito Jaime, who had stolen her away from her family. She and Anton helped Isabel escape from Jaime but they failed after the tires of Anton's car were shot by Jaime. Jaime tries to shoot Anton but instead hits Donna. Because of what he did, he ran away and Anton rushed Donna to the hospital. On the meanwhile, Isabel ran away and she received help from a woman named Rosella Salgado.

=== The battle for justice ===
Through Brian, they got help from a lawyer named Cynthia Salazar (Carmina Villarroel-Legaspi) to file a case against Sandra. She was imprisoned by Cynthia but immediately got parole which led to disappointment of the Salgado siblings and Donya Consuelo. Cynthia worked hard to find a bigger case against Sandra to ensure her long term imprisonment. Elaine and Ligaya also helped Esperanza on their case as a payment for their sins towards her by serving as a witness against Sandra. A court hearing case against Sandra happened but the Bermudez family lost because Sandra paid the judge.

Another court hearing on Sandra's case was conducted and she lost which led to her second imprisonment. But her lawyer helped her to get a parole again and she was released from imprisonment for the second time. On the meanwhile, Donna's condition got worse due to complications in her body to the point that life support is the only one that can make her alive. Anton and Louie have decided to remove the life support, which leads to her death. Esperanza celebrated her birthday but she is puzzled why Elaine and Ligaya did not go. Later on, she discovered that they were tortured and killed by Sandra and her henchmen.

Sandra convinced Celia to join forces with her to kill Esperanza and the latter did it. During their attempt to kill Esperanza, Andrea was shot by Sandra to death. As a result, Sandra was arrested once again and Celia loses her sanity and goes crazy. She was put into a mental institution after her condition grows worse while mourning Andrea's loss. On the meanwhile, Jaime was arrested by policemen. On the other hand, a problem aroused on Miguel family as an extra-marital relationship of Luis and Marita (Via Veloso) was formed, which led to anger of Ester, Danilo and Noel towards them.

It was discovered that Cynthia is planning a revenge against Sandra and Salgado family. She is Rosella Salgado, the illegitimate daughter of Juan Salgado to a prostitute woman named Rose. She was rejected by Juan and Sandra did not help her and her mother during their hard times. She has been planning for years to get vengeance on her father's family, even sending her lover Brian as her spy who accidentally fell in love with Esperanza. She planned to make Brian and Esperanza married to make Esperanza suffer. It was also discovered that she locked Isabel on her house.

While Brian and Esperanza became lovers, Anton came back and he did all his best efforts to tell the truth to Esperanza that Isabel was her mother. Brian developed an anger towards him, which led to their rivalry in Esperanza's heart. Donya Consuelo admitted to the Salgado siblings that Isabel is their long lost mother. On the meanwhile, Sandra hired investigators to investigate Cynthia and she discovered that Cynthia is also Rosella Salgado. Ramona also told her that someone, whom she called "General", will help her to escape the prison. As time passes by, the relationship of Brian and Esperanza became worse until they broke up.

=== The ultimate tribulation of Salgado family ===
Buboy went back and she visited the Bermudez family. He continued his romantic relationship with Cecille. When Danilo, Buboy and Cecille went to Manila to visit Ester, Sandra told Cecille that Cynthia Salazar is Rosella Salgado, their long lost half-sister. As a result, she went to Cynthia's office and discovered that Sandra's words were true. Cecille discovered the evil intentions of Cynthia and Brian. As a result, she tried to escape but she was abducted by Cynthia. Because of what happened, Donya Consuelo, Esperanza and Danilo started to worry about her whereabouts. Anton and Mayor Raul helped them to find Cecille by reporting it to the police.

While the search for Cecille is ongoing, Brian sent a death threat to Anton and his mother, Elena. Sandra managed to escape the prison by pretending that her stomach is aching. Ramona and the henchmen of "General" helped her to hide from the police. On the meanwhile, Juan returned from the United States to take Esperanza, Danilo and Donya Consuelo to his house. Due to Juan's return, Cynthia started to abuse Isabel with the help of her household helper Mameng (Luz Fernandez). It was revealed that it is her who helped Sandra to escape the prison. She also killed Ramona by gunshot and Sandra by burning her to death as part of her final revenge to her.

Juan asked help from the police to investigate the loss of Isabel and Cecille. This move from Juan led Cynthia to attempt to transfer Cecille in another place but they were involved in a car accident. Cynthia survives while Cecille is in grave danger. Due to Cynthia's fear that Cecille will tell her true intention to her family, she hired a doctor that will inject a lethal injection to Cecille. A few hours later, Cecille regained consciousness but after she saw Cynthia, she started to have a seizure which lead to her death.

After Cecille's death, Jaime secretly went out of prison every midnight and he joined forces with Cynthia/Rosella to destroy the Salgado family. Meanwhile, Esperanza learned about Cynthia's identity by receiving a hint from Brian. She also discovered her connivance with Jaime. As a result, Cynthia also abducted Esperanza to join Isabel and her captives and attempted to take her planned revenge out on the Salgado family. However, Brian backstabbed Cynthia by helping Esperanza escape while Isabel was left behind because her legs were too weak to run. Because of what he did, Cynthia transferred Isabel to an abandoned construction site and she let Juan see her.

When Juan, Esperanza and Danilo went to see Isabel, Cynthia planned to gradually kill him and he was shot by Jaime on his feet. Later on, Anton distracted Cynthia, Jaime, and their goons. Isabel was saved from their hands and the Salgado family escaped except Esperanza. Due to her presence, she and Anton were trapped by the enemies. Suddenly, Brian killed Jaime who was about to shoot both Anton and Esperanza. The policemen have successfully arrested Cynthia and she was sentenced to the death penalty.

=== Ending ===
After several years of tribulations and trials, the Salgado family got reunited once again and decided to migrate to the United States even though Cecille is gone. Esperanza visited Brian in the prison and she told her that Anton already forgave him. Brian apologized to her and he wished that they will meet each other again in the future. Danilo and Esperanza visited their adoptive family for the last time. Esperanza is reunited with Celia, who's still recovering from her loss of sanity, while Ester was released from imprisonment after receiving a parole. Anton and Esperanza confessed their love to each other and the former promised that he will wait for the return of the latter.

== Cast and characters ==
=== Protagonist ===
- Judy Ann Santos as Esperanza Estrera / Socorro Bermudez-Salgado

=== Main cast ===
- Marvin Agustin as Danilo Miguel / Raphael Bermudez-Salgado
- Angelika Dela Cruz as Cecille Montejo / Regina Bermudez-Salgado
- Wowie de Guzman as Antonio "Anton" Flerida, later Montejo
- Elizabeth Oropesa as Sandra Bermudez-Salgado
- Rosa Rosal as Doña Consuelo Bermudez
- Lito Legaspi as Joaquin Montejo
- Sylvia Sanchez as Celia Estrera
- Joel Torre as Raul Estrera
- Bembol Roco as Luis Miguel
- Chat Silayan-Baylon as Ester Miguel
- Spencer Reyes as Noel Miguel
- Dante Rivero as Juan Salgado
- Charo Santos-Concio as Isabel Bermudez-Salgado later Ilustre
- Jackie Lou Blanco as Monica de Dios / Monica Pedrosa
- Jericho Rosales as Roberto "Buboy" Guevarra
- Carmina Villarroel as Atty. Cynthia Salazar / Rosella Panganiban-Salgado
- Piolo Pascual as Brian Espiritu
- Tommy Abuel as Dr. Jaime Illustre

=== Supporting cast ===
- Tanya Garcia as Andrea Estrera
- Emman Abeleda as Jun-Jun Estrera
- Dominic Ochoa as Robbie Pereira
- Jolina Magdangal as Karen Alonzo-Montejo
- Dimples Romana as Paula Salgado, later de Dios
- Mel Kimura as Yaya Ramona
- Melissa Mendez as Elena Flerida
- Ama Quiambao as Lola Belen
- Beth Tamayo as Donna Villareal-Montejo
- Gloria Sevilla as Lola Pacita
- Hilda Koronel as Stella Guevarra
- Romnick Sarmienta as Emilio "Emil" Peralta

=== Special Participation ===
- Rico Yan as Gabriel Maglayon (crossover character from Mula sa Puso - Episode 421)

=== Recurring cast ===
- Jennifer Sevilla as Elaine de Leon Domingo / fake Socorro Salgado
- Rez Cortez as Delfin Flerida
- Connie Chua as Kuala
- Nita Grandea as Yaya Inday
- Cheska Garcia-Kramer as Joanna Arkanghel
- Tricia Roman as Edith Montemayor
- Rose zen Lopez as Grace Ann Lopez
- Dianne dela Fuente as Marivic Solano
- Arjie Joseph Padilla Sartin as Baby Marvin Agustin (Danilo Miguel / Raphael Bermudez-Salgado)
- Jane Zaleta as Alma Solano
- JR Herrera as Ruel Mulingbayan
- Jeffrey Hidalgo as Jay-Jay del Rosario
- Augusto Victa as Alfonso "Ponso" Miguel
- Amado Cortez as Lolo Cirilo
- Sharmaine Suarez as Vanessa Roberts
- Teresa Loyzaga as Belinda Montejo
- Aida Espiritu as Eden
- John Apacible as Ricardo
- Ruby Rosa as Lydia
- Erika Siguia as Edith
- John Mari Locsin
- Anna Marin
- Aya Medel as Alice
- Corrine Mendez as Maria Cristina "Cristy" Mariano
- Mely Tagasa as Principal
- Nante Montereal as Pedring
- Bella Flores as Mrs. Sanidad
- Troy Martino as Mr. Tiongco
- Tess Dumpit as Tessie
- Chris Michelena as Ruben
- Steven Alonzo as Francis
- Gio Alvarez as Edmund
- Richard Arellano as Aldo
- Gami Viray as Vice Mayor Aguirre
- Monina Bagatsing as Theresa "Issa" Peralta
- Allan Bautista as Alex
- Ana Capri as Rita
- Diego Castro III as Bayani "Bai"
- Shamaine Centenera as Sonya
- Gandong Cervantes as Ompong
- Renato del Prado
- Marianne dela Riva as Lorena Carvajal-Alonzo
- Miguel dela Rosa as Jason Robles
- Andrea del Rosario as Ditas
- Fredmoore delos Santos as George
- Ronnie Lazaro as Duarte Maranan
- Rad Dominguez
- Felindo Obach as Vice Mayor Robles
- Suzette Ranillo as Minerva
- CJ Ramos as Carlo
- Stella Ruiz as Karla
- Mark Vernal as Erwin Rodriguez
- Justin Cuyugan as Ferds
- Tessie Villarama as Mrs. Ricaforte
- Emilio Garcia as Leandro Guevarra
- Glenda Garcia as Gemma
- Val Iglesias as Mulong
- Allan Paule as Oca
- Tom Olivar as Badong
- Aljon Jimenez as Celso
- Jess Evardone as Dario
- Baron Geisler as Loy-Loy
- Mosang as Yaya Caring
- Ernie Zarate as Councilor Martin Alberto
- Yda Yaneza
- Pocholo Montes as Mr. Sionco
- Jean Saburit as Joy "Ligaya" de Leon-Domingo
- Via Veloso as Marita
- Cris Daluz as Tata Ciano
- Corrine Lirio as young Cynthia Salazar / Rosella Salgado
- Mat Ranillo III as Louie Villareal
- Luz Fernandez as Mameng
- Eric Fructuoso as Antonio "Tonio"
- Patricia Anne Roque as Kathrin, later Kathrin Ching
- Leandro Baldemor as Rick
- Biboy Ramirez as one of Esperanza's fake college friends
- Mia Gutierrez as Rosemarie Panganiban
- Julia Clarete as Angie
- Mon Confiado as dying man in Robbie's support group (Episode 386)
- Carmen Enriquez as Buboy's grandmother

== Ratings ==
The show posted the country's highest rating of a single episode in a TV series, at 67%, in one of its episodes in 1997. Its finale episode rating of 59.8% is the second highest rated finale episode in all of Philippine television, behind the 2002 finale episode of Pangako Sa 'Yo (also aired by ABS-CBN).

== Adaptation ==
Star Cinema selected the film as its entry for the 25th Metro Manila Film Festival from the same title as the movie version, which began on December 25, 1999.

== Difference between the series and the movie ==
Series	Movie version
Celia is with Raul when the bus carrying Isabel and her children explodes.	Mayor Joaquin is with Raul when the bus exploded.
Doña Consuelo did not curse Isabel for refusing to marry Jaime.	Doña Consuelo has cursed Isabel and her family for refusing to marry Jaime.
Isabel and her children moved into their new home in Manila.	Isabel and her children go to Manila to adopt Rosella, Juan's firstborn child.
Esperanza and Cecille are enemies in the beginning of the series.	Esperanza and Cecille never become enemies.
The Estrera family lives in the fields of San Isidro, Quezon.	The Estrera family lives in the coastline.
Esperanza learns she is adopted at home when a drunk Celia expressed her frustrations.	Esperanza learns she is adopted during a visit to Raul in prison.
Raul is imprisoned after being falsely accused of killing Ricardo, who is Belinda's lover.	Raul is imprisoned after being falsely accused of killing Belinda.
Esperanza and Cecille, along with Anton, travel to Manila to search for their biological parents. Danilo learns the truth about his identity after Ester confessed to Esperanza.	Esperanza, Danilo, Cecille, and Anton go to Manila to find their biological parents.
Juan always knew his children were still alive, so he goes to Esperanza's house after her father's search is aired on TV.	Juan is unaware that his children are still alive when the Salgado siblings visit his house because of Sandra.
Raul and Celia temporarily separate during the series but remain legally married. Celia lives with her partner, Duarte, while Raul falls in love with Karla, Ester's former colleague from her previous job in Taiwan.	Raul and Celia never separated and they had no other relationships while married.
Esperanza fell in love with Robbie after her breakup with Anton, who later died of leukemia.	Robbie's character is not included in the movie.
Sandra tricked the Salgado siblings into thinking that Juan is dead.	Sandra tricked the Salgado siblings into thinking that Juan went to the U.S. for treatment.
Sandra kills Mayor Joaquin in the forest after he hands over Cecille to Doña Consuelo.	Sandra kills Mayor Joaquin in a hotel room because she believed he revealed the truth about his children to Juan.
Celia joined forces with Sandra to destroy and kill Esperanza.	This storyline is not included in the movie.
Cynthia, who introduces herself as Cynthia Salazar to Sandra, is later revealed to also be Rosella Salgado after Sandra hires investigators to uncover her true identity.	Cynthia introduces herself as Rosella Salgado to Sandra.
Luis falls in love with Marita while his wife, Ester, is in prison for trying to kill Sandra while she was asleep.	Marita's character is not included in the movie.
Andrea dies after accidentally being shot by Sandra.	Andrea did not die in the movie.
Cecille is abducted by Cynthia after she learned the latter's real intention.	This storyline is not included in the movie.
Anton and Brian met each for the first time in a church.	Anton and Brian met each for the first time on a street.
Jaime is killed by Brian during the final confrontation between Cynthia and him against Esperanza and Anton in an abandoned building.	Jaime commits suicide.
Ramona betrays Sandra after receiving a higher amount of money from Cynthia.	Ramona does not betray Sandra throughout the movie.
Cynthia shoots Ramona before killing Sandra.	This storyline is not included in the movie.
Cynthia kills Sandra by burning her alive.	Cynthia kills Sandra by shooting her.
Cecille was killed by lethal injection, ordered by Cynthia out of fear that Cecille would wake up and reveal the truth to Esperanza.	Cynthia accidentally shot Cecille instead of targeting Esperanza..
Esperanza is abducted by Cynthia after the former discovers the latter's connivance with Jaime.	Esperanza is abducted by Brian after she refused to love him.
Juan, Esperanza, and Danilo visit an abandoned place to find Isabel, who is being controlled by Cynthia and Jaime.	Juan, Esperanza, Danilo and Cecille, accompanied by Cynthia, go to an abandoned place to reunite with Isabel.
Cynthia, with the help of Jaime and her henchmen, attempts to kill Juan.	Cynthia, with the help of Brian, attempts to kill the whole Salgado family.
Celia loses her sanity because of Andrea's death.	This storyline is not included in the movie.

== International release ==
Even as the show was airing on ABS-CBN, the management confirmed that there were foreign buyers of the soap opera and was to be translated. It is slated to air on foreign TV channels, having the international title Esperanza. After the original run on its mother network TFC, released it and was delayed from its original air date and aired at 7:00pm EST and 4:00pm PST.

== Soundtrack ==
The theme song was sung by April Boy Regino for TV while the movie version was sung by Andre Ibbara. The song was re-released in 2010 via 60 Years of Music of Philippine Soap Opera.

== Trivia ==
- This was Judy Ann's first starring title role on Primetime after doing 2 Daytime Soaps as a title character like Ula and Mara Clara as Mara. She explained in a 2013 interview after the departure of Gladys Reyes to her film studio Viva Films to do projects for Viva Television and GMA-7 after her effective role in Mara Clara as the main antagonist Clara Davis.
- This is the last soap opera of Judy Ann Santos and Wowie de Guzman as a love team. They dated for few years. Their love team was dissolved in late 1999 after they broke up.
- The characters of Andrea and Cecille were killed in 1999 because Tanya Garcia and Angelika Dela Cruz would transfer to GMA Network during that time.
- This was the first teleserye that Angelika Dela Cruz's character was killed due to transfer of the rival network GMA. The second teleserye is 2007's Prinsesa ng Banyera (after she transferred back to ABS in 2003) in which her character was also killed in the middle of the series.
- Esperanza is the first soap opera of ABS-CBN that is intended for primetime slot since the network's reopening in 1986. Mara Clara aired on primetime slot before but it was an afternoon soap opera originally.
- This soap opera and its rival Mula sa Puso led to the formation of friendly rivalry between Judy Ann Santos and Claudine Barretto.
- This is Dimples Romana's first major television series as a supporting character.
- The role of Isabel is the first soap opera role of Charo Santos in ABS-CBN.
- Beth Tamayo is Judy Ann Santos' closest friend even though their roles, Donna and Esperanza respectively, in this series are rivals.
- This series is known for having many villains.
- Rico Yan's character in Mula sa Puso, Gabriel, had a crossover in this series and the character of Esperanza made a crossover in Mula sa Puso. These crossovers are promotion for Kay Tagal Kang Hinintay, a movie starring Yan and Santos.

== See also ==
- List of programs broadcast by ABS-CBN
- List of ABS-CBN drama series
