= Whattamen =

2001 Philippine television sitcom series

- Title card
- Genre: Situational comedy
- Written by: Jose Javier Reyes
- Directed by: John D. Lazatin; Danni Caparas
- Starring: Rico Yan; Marvin Agustin; Dominic Ochoa; Ai-Ai delas Alas
- Opening theme: "Whattamen"
- Country of origin: Philippines
- Original language: Filipino
- No. of episodes: 128

Production
- Executive producer: Rowena Feliciano
- Production company: ABS-CBN

Original release
- Network: ABS-CBN
- Release: September 12, 2001 – February 18, 2004

Related
- Palibhasa Lalake

Whattamen is a Philippine television sitcom series broadcast by ABS-CBN. Directed by John D. Lazatin and Danni Caparas, it stars Rico Yan, Marvin Agustin, Dominic Ochoa, and Ai-Ai delas Alas. It aired from September 12, 2001 to February 18, 2004, and was replaced by Yes, Yes Show!.

== History ==
Rico, Marvin and Dominic's on-screen chemistry was first seen in the network's Saturday youth oriented show Gimik from June 15, 1996 to February 13, 1999. At that time, they were not performing yet as a group but they were close friends off-cam despite their solo careers as young actors. After Gimik was cancelled, the trio would continue appearing in different ABS-CBN programs, mostly on primetime soap operas. In 1999 and 2000, Rico, Marvin and Dominic appeared as guest co-hosts for Megastar Sharon Cuneta's birthday celebration. Their one-off hosting stint at "Sharon" was well-received, noting there was chemistry and rapport between the three.

In late 2000, the network launched Star Magic Presents, a weekly program that showcased ABS-CBN's homegrown talents in different entertainment formats. They chose Rico, Marvin and Dominic to headline the pilot episode of the program, a mini-sitcom entitled Whattamen, which the title is based on the song title "Whatta Man" by Salt-n-Pepa with En Vogue. They were joined by Jannette Mc Bride, Gabe Mercado and JM Rodriguez. The episode garnered high ratings for Star Magic. The group did another episode of Whattamen a month after and also received high ratings again. This led the network to officially launch Rico, Marvin and Dominic in the noontime show Magandang Tanghali Bayan as a trio in early 2001 following the exit of one of its main host, Willie Revillame.

While doing MTB, the newly formed Whattamen trio made waves everywhere. On September 12, 2001, Whattamen became a full-length primetime weekly sitcom, occupying the Wednesday night time slot. Comedian Ai-Ai delas Alas joined the show as one of the main cast.

Compared to previous ABS-CBN sitcoms, Whattamen was a game-changer of sorts. It was a short sitcom, with just 30 minutes of running time (including commercials). Midway into its first season, the show was already beating the competition week after week with relevant storylines and out of the box delivery of laughs. On the second season, Whattamen's running time was extended to 45 minutes. Streetboys member and upcoming comedian Vhong Navarro was added to the cast. The improved second season was also rating well. Until fate intervened.

On March 29, 2002, Rico Yan died in his sleep while on vacation in Palawan. His death left a big void in the show. On April 3, 2002, the whole cast of Whattamen paid tribute to him via the two-hour TV special Whattaguy: Salamat Rico. After Rico's death, the show aired three more episodes which he taped before he died.

The sitcom continued without Rico. New cast members included John Prats, Joyce Jimenez, Jenny Miller, Ryan Agoncillo, Melanie Marquez and Dennis Padilla. Sitcom director John D. Lazatin was assigned to direct the ABS-CBN teleserye Bituin and was replaced by Danny Caparas.

== Cast ==
- Marvin Agustin as Matti
- Dominic Ochoa as Ernest
- Rico Yan† as Richie (2001-2002)
- Ai-Ai delas Alas as Tita Vicky
- Patricia Ysmael as Angeline
- Candy Pangilinan as Bebeng
- Izza Ignacio as Jasmine (2001)
- Joyce Jimenez as April (2002-2003)
- Vhong Navarro as Elton
- John Prats as Oca (2002-2003)
- Melanie Marquez as Auntie Siony (2002-2003)
- Jenny Miller as Bubba (2002-2004)
- Ryan Agoncillo as Raymond (2003)
- Dennis Padilla as Yakki (2003-2004)
- Katya Santos as Blossom (2003-2004)
- Cherry Lou as Cherry (2003-2004)
- Sammy Lagmay as Kapitan (2003-2004)

== Cancellation ==
The show was cancelled on February 18, 2004, along with its post-program, Klasmeyts to make way for the new Wednesday gag show Yes, Yes Show!.

== Reruns ==
The show re-aired on Jeepney TV, Studio 23, and internationally on BRO in 2012–2015. In 2016, the now reformatted BRO, called Sports and Action, re-aired the series with its other sitcoms like Palibhasa Lalake and Home Along Da Riles.

== Reunion Special ==
Aside from the rerun of the sitcom, Jeepney TV also produced a reunion special featuring the whole cast (minus Rico). The cast reminisced about the funny moments during the show's whole run, capped with a big revelation by Dominic when one of the lead stars from the rival show Beh Bote Nga of GMA Network gave his blessing to the Whattamen trio.

== See also ==
- List of programs broadcast by ABS-CBN
