= Rico Yan =

Filipino actor (1975–2002)

- Born: Ricardo Carlos Castro Yan; March 14, 1975; Mandaluyong, Rizal, Philippines
- Died: March 29, 2002 (aged 27); Puerto Princesa, Palawan, Philippines
- Resting place: Manila Memorial Park – Sucat
- Education: De La Salle University
- Occupations: Actor; model; host; businessman; spokesperson
- Years active: 1995–2002
- Agent: Star Magic (1995–2002)
- Partner: Claudine Barretto (1997–2002)
- Relatives: Manuel Yan (paternal grandfather); Angelo Castro Jr. (maternal uncle); Diego Castro III (maternal cousin); Kenneth Ilagan (maternal cousin); Mondo Castro (maternal cousin)

Rico Yan (full name Ricardo Carlos "Rico" Castro Yan; Tagalog: [jan]; March 14, 1975 – March 29, 2002) was a Filipino film and television actor active during the mid-1990s and the early 2000s.

Yan started as a commercial model in 1995 and in November of that year was launched as a pioneer of Talent Center's Star Circle Batch 1, now known as ABS-CBN's Star Magic. He became a household name with his roles as Ricky Salveron in Gimik (1996–1999) and Gabriel Maglayon in Mula Sa Puso (1997–1999), starring in commercially successful television shows and films where he was often paired with Judy Ann Santos and Claudine Barretto.

Yan solidified his matinee idol status through films such as Paano Ang Puso Ko? (1997), Dahil Mahal na Mahal Kita (1998), Kay Tagal Kang Hinintay (1998), Mula sa Puso: The Movie (1999), Gimik: The Reunion (1999), and Got 2 Believe (2002). In 2014, twelve years after his death, Star Cinema ranked him No. 5 in their list of "The Kings of Star Cinema". In addition to his film career, Yan appeared in several television shows, including Mara Clara (1996), 'Sang Linggo nAPO Sila (1996), Saan Ka Man Naroroon (1999), Magandang Tanghali Bayan (2001), and Whattamen (2001).

Yan died from acute haemorrhagic pancreatitis on March 29, 2002 at the age of 27.

== Early life and education ==
Rico Yan was born at The Medical City, then located in Mandaluyong, Rizal, Philippines, and grew up in a family of soldiers and businessmen. He was the son of Roberto Yan Sr. (1947–2015) – an ethnic Filipino Chinese from Metro Manila – and his Ilocana wife Teresita Castro-Yan who was born in the hill station city of Baguio owing to her father Isabelo's posting in the Philippine Military Academy located there, but the family actually came from Laoag, Ilocos Norte. He was the patrilineal grandson of Manuel T. Yan Sr. (1920–2008), the former Chief of Staff of the Armed Forces of the Philippines and Ambassador to Thailand, Indonesia, and the United Kingdom.

Yan had three siblings: Geraldine, Tina, and television host Bobby. His parents were business owners and ran a security agency, drawing on the family's military background. Yan attended Xavier School for his primary education, graduating in 1987, and completed high school at De La Salle Santiago Zobel School in 1992. He earned his bachelor's degree in Marketing Management from De La Salle University in 1997.

== Career ==
=== Early work: 1995 ===
Yan was discovered waiting in line at a fast food restaurant at age 20 while he was a senior student at De La Salle University. A talent scout approached him and asked if he was interested in becoming a commercial model, resulting in him joining Cosmopolitan Modeling Agency and being selected as the lead in his first television commercial. Talent manager Johnny Manahan later asked Yan if he wanted to pursue acting, and he went on to be managed by Biboy Arboleda.

In 1995 Yan joined Star Circle Batch 1, a group of eight new talents. During this time, he balanced his modeling and acting pursuits with completing his marketing thesis and college coursework.

=== Breakthrough: 1996–2000 ===
In June 1996, Yan portrayed the boy-next-door character Ricky Salveron in the youth-oriented show Gimik, directed by Laurenti Dyogi and aired on The Filipino Channel (TFC). The show focused on the lives of a close-knit group of young people living in an imaginary village, exploring the experiences and joys of youth, with Yan starred alongside Judy Ann Santos, Jolina Magdangal, Giselle Toengi, Mylene Dizon, Patrick Garcia, Diether Ocampo, and Marvin Agustin. Gimik ran for three years and was later adapted into the film GIMIK: The Reunion in 1999.

Also in 1996, Yan acted in his first primetime drama as one of the main cast on Mara Clara Book 2. He played a young medical intern named Derrick Villa who had a tangled life due to a forced union to his girlfriend, but operated on Mara Judy Ann Santos to save her life after an assassination attempt. Yan also became a co-host on the midday variety show 'Sang Linggo nAPO Sila, where he had a segment called "Ricollection."

In 1997 Yan played alongside Claudine Barretto as the protagonist Gabriel Maglayon in the successful primetime television drama Mula sa Puso, portraying a dedicated cab driver willing to give up everything for his family and loved ones. The series ran for two years and was adapted into a film, Mula sa Puso: The Movie, in 1999. Playing Gabriel proved to be one of Yan's most notable roles on television.

In March 1997 and April 1998 Yan featured as a guest artist in twelve episodes of Star Drama Presents. One of the few Talent Center artists to make numerous appearances on the series, he showcased his versatility as an actor by playing various characters.

In 1999 Yan starred in the television drama Saan Ka Man Naroroon opposite Claudine Barretto, playing Daniel Pineda, an uncomplicated young agriculturist who when faced with love becomes uncertain about the hardships of life. Although he marries a wealthy older woman to improve his living situation, the union is plagued by lies and deceit. During this time Yan appeared in six episodes of the drama anthology Maalaala Mo Kaya – "Valentine's Card" (1996); "Dinuguan" (1996); "Diary" (1996); "Agua Bendita" (1997); "Shades" (1998); and "Medalya" (1999) – where he was able to work with veteran actors and actresses such as Eddie Garcia, Tirso Cruz, Hilda Coronel, Manilyn Reynes, Caridad Sanchez, and Boots Anson Roa.

In 2000 Yan worked with director Chito S. Roño on the mini-series Detour, marking his third starring role in Star Drama Presents. He portrayed Carl, an eccentric young man from a wealthy background who was dying and on a journey through life.

Yan transitioned to leading roles in films in 1996 and 1997, starring in Paano ang Puso Ko?, where he portrayed Jason Delgado, a free-spirited, mischievous, and playful repatriate who, despite being indisposed, wanted to live a normal life and enjoy it to the fullest. He also played Joel Bernabe, a diligent merchandiser, in the two-part Flames: the Movie.

In September 1998 Yan had his first role as a leading man in a full-length film, the romantic drama Kay Tagal Kang Hinintay, directed by Rory Quintos and shot in the romantic Vigan, Ilocos Sur, Philippines. He portrayed Alex Medina, an aspiring businessman whose only dream is to open his own restaurant, playing opposite Judy Ann Santos, whose character must choose between her family and Alex. In June 1998 Yan starred alongside Claudine Barretto in the film Dahil Mahal na Mahal Kita, directed by Wenn V. Deramas. Yan played Miguel Quirino, an affluent, intellectual, and arrogant student council president who falls in love with the campus bad girl Mela despite his mother's animosity. It received positive critical and commercial responses.

=== Critical success: 2001–2002 ===
In 2001 Yan transitioned from leading man roles to comedy in the all-male comedy sitcom Whattamen – initially introduced on Gimik – showcasing his comedic talent alongside the Whattamen comic trio of Dominic Ochoa, Marvin Agustin, and Ai-Ai delas Alas. Yan played the charming and witty Castro, a restaurant owner who was the charming and level-headed member of the group. The trio later transitioned from the sitcom to the daily afternoon show Magandang Tanghali Bayan, where Yan was launched as one of the new hosts.

In February 2002 Yan filmed his final movie, Got 2 Believe, a romantic comedy directed by Olivia Lamasan in which he portrays Lorenz Montinola, a commitment-phobic photographer whose sole ambition is to achieve international success.The film was a major box office success and Yan recorded a duet with Claudine Barretto for one of the theme songs, "Got to Believe in Magic." The film's official soundtrack received a gold record award prior to Yan's death.

Before his death, Yan was set to work on three additional movies with Star Cinema following the success of Got 2 Believe. He had been chosen by screenwriter Ricky Lee and director Marilou Diaz-Abaya to play a lead role in the sequel to Moral, and was also cast in a major role for the play Sinta with Dulaang Sibol of Ateneo Theater, to be directed by Johnny Manahan. He was involved in the sequel to Fernando Poe Jr. and Judy Ann Santos' film Isusumbong Kita sa Tatay Ko..., and also had two shows airing on television at the time of his death: Magandang Tanghali Bayan, and Whattamen.

== Death and memorial ==
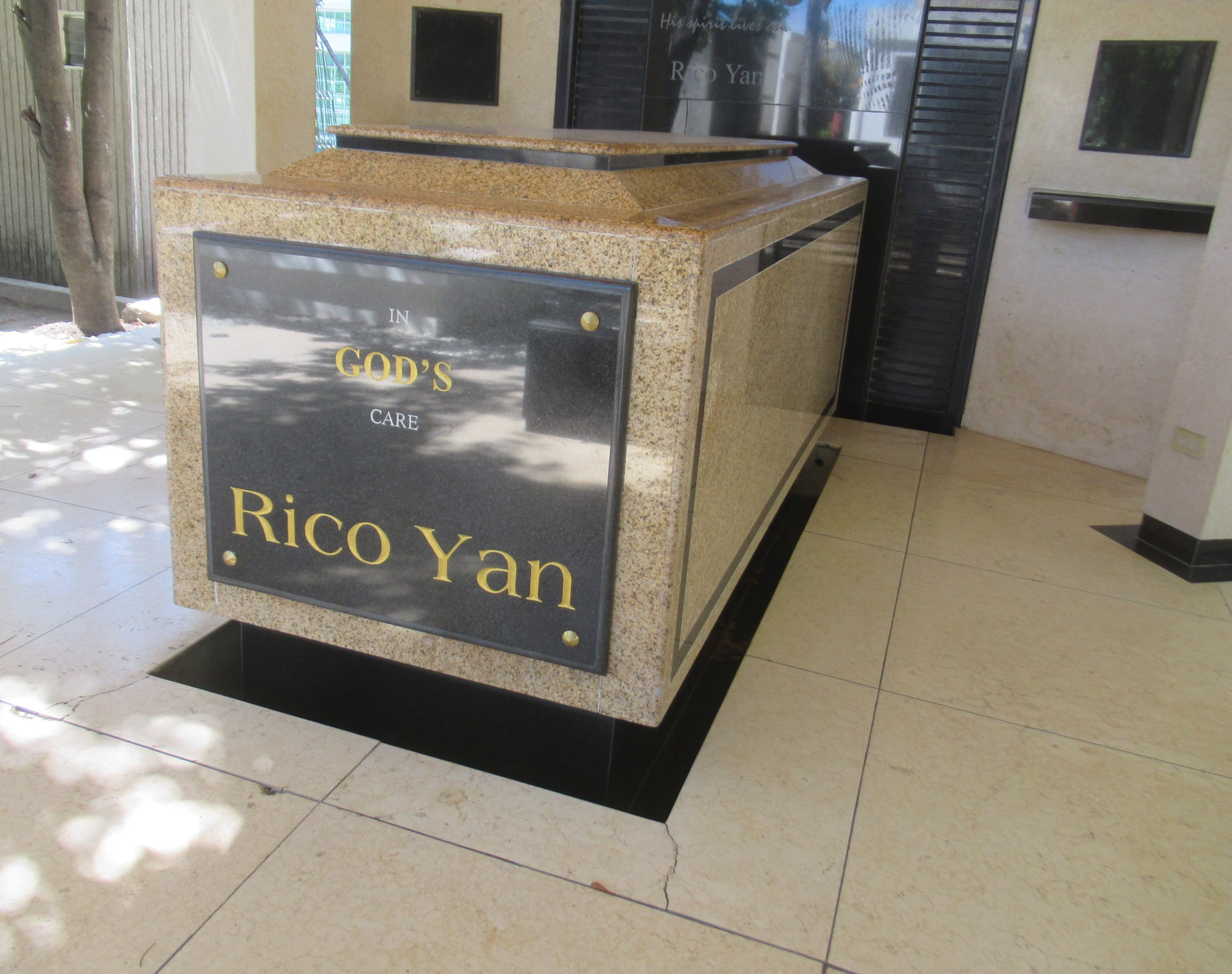
Yan's tomb at the Manila Memorial Park – Sucat

On March 29, 2002, while on vacation during Holy Week, Yan was found dead by his actor friend Dominic Ochoa inside his hotel room at the Dos Palmas Resort in Puerto Princesa, Palawan, having died of cardiac arrest due to acute haemorrhagic pancreatitis. His public wake was held at La Salle Green Hills, and an estimated 10,000 - 20,000 people attended his final funeral rites in Metro Manila. His funeral was also televised live on ABS-CBN, with numerous television tributes honoring him. Gary Valenciano moved people to tears with his rendition of "The Warrior Is a Child," a song Rico had requested.

Yan was interred at the Yan Mausoleum inside the Manila Memorial Park in Parañaque on April 4, initially beside his grandmother Amelia Yan who had died in 1983. Yan's burial was ranked by SPOT as Number 6 on the "List of Most Attended Funerals in Philippine History". His remains were later moved to his current resting place across the mausoleum, with his original tomb later occupied as intended by his grandfather Manuel, who died in 2008.

A portion of the proceeds from the ticket sales of his last movie Got 2 Believe, his documentary Forever Young: Remembering Rico, and another of his films Dahil Mahal Na Mahal Kita, were contributed to the Rico Yan Youth Foundation, which was established on May 8, 2002 at the PhilSports Complex.

== Personal life ==
Yan first dated Tricia Sandejas. He later dated actress Claudine Barretto from 1993 to 1997 and she became his on-screen partner from when they co-starred in Radio Romance in 1996. They broke up in November 2001 but their separation was not announced until after his sudden death.

Yan's spiritual adviser Fr. Tito Caluag disclosed after Yan's death that Yan wanted to become president, saying: "Rico wanted to be a leader but never mentioned leadership because he only wanted to serve. He wanted to be like JFK, who gave America a sense of pride and class and inspired his people."

== Other endeavors ==
Yan was also a successful entrepreneur and owned several businesses, including Orbitz Pearl Shakes, Java Hut, Buddy Burger, Timbuktu Cafe, and Tequila Joe Grill and Restaurants. He also had a column in the Manila Bulletin entitled "C'est la Vie."

In 1998 Yan became the first official youth spokesman for the Department of Education, Culture, and Sports, touring the Philippines without payment to promote education among young people. In addition to establishing the Pinoy Yan Movement, a non-profit organization aimed at encouraging youth to stay in school and value education, he assisted the Are You a Forest King? Foundation, visiting many schools to promote the importance of tree growth. He was also involved in various foundations and initiatives that furthered the interests of youth and leadership formation. Yan was also the first spokesperson for the Philippine National Red Cross Pledge 25 in 1999.

== Filmography ==
=== Films ===
Year	Title	Role
1996	Radio Romance	Gary Balmaceda
1996	Ama, Ina, Anak	Dennis
1996	Madrasta	Dodie
1997	Paano Ang Puso Ko?	Jason Delgado
1997	Home Along da Riles da Movie 2	Gabriel
1997	Flames: The Movie (Part 2: Pangako)	Joel Bernabe
1998	Dahil Mahal na Mahal Kita	Miguel Quirino
1998	Kay Tagal Kang Hinintay	Alex Medina
1999	Mula sa Puso: The Movie	Gabriel Maglayon
1999	Gimik: The Reunion	Ricky Salveron
2002	Got 2 Believe	Lorenz Montinola

=== Television ===
Year	TV show	Role	Notes / Episodes
1995–2002	ASAP	Himself	Performer
1996–1999	Gimik	Ricardo "Ricky" Salveron	Main Role
1996–1997	Mara Clara	Derrick Gonzales	Book 2
1996	Maalaala Mo Kaya	Dante	Main Role; Episode: "Valentines Card"
1996	Maalaala Mo Kaya	Jun	Main Role; Episode: "Dinuguan"
1996	Maalaala Mo Kaya	Dave	Main Role Episode: "Diary"
1996	Telesine Specials	Carlo	Episode: "Roses for Tracy"
1996	Star Drama Presents	Joshua	Guest Episode: "He Loves Me, He Loves Me Not"
1996–1998	'Sang Linggo nAPO Sila	Host	
1997–1999	Mula sa Puso	Gabriel Maglayon	Main Role
1997	Wansapanataym	Rico	Pilot Episode: "Ang Mahiwagang Palasyo"
1997	Maalaala Mo Kaya	Nicko	Main Role Episode: "Agua Bendita"
1998	Esperanza	Gabriel Maglayon	Guest
	Star Drama Presents	Carlo	Featured Artist Episode: "Matinee Idol"
	Star Drama Presents	JJ	Featured Artist Episode: "Rebelde"
	Star Drama Presents	Marco	Featured Artist Episode: "Internet"
	Star Drama Presents	Jake	Featured Artist Episode "Take Two"
1998	Star Drama Presents	Francis De Leon	Featured Artist Episode: "Walang Personalan"
	Star Drama Presents	Miguel	Featured Artist Episode: "Recuerdo"
	Star Drama Presents	Randy Macaraeg	Featured Artist Episode: "Gubat sa Likod ng Rehas"
	Star Drama Presents	Wilfredo	Featured Artist Episode: "Jose, Reynaldo, Wilfredo"
1998	Maalaala Mo Kaya	Gerald Robles	Main Role Episode: "Shades"
1999	Kulturang Handog Para Sa Bayan	Host	
1999	FLAMES	Sam	Main Role Episode: "Amerika o Wala"
1999	Usapang Business	Himself	Guest
1999	The Correspondents	Himself	Guest Correspondent; Martial Law
1999–2001	Saan Ka Man Naroroon	Daniel Pineda	Main Role
1999	Maalaala Mo Kaya	Stephen	Main Role Episode: "Medalya"
2000	Pipol	Himself	Guest
2000	Star Drama Presents	Carl	Mini Series; Main Role; Episode: "Detour"
2001	StarStudio	Richard	Main Role Episode: "Crossroads"
2001	Laki sa Laya	Host	
2002	Coverstory	Himself	Guest
2002	CinemaTalk	Himself	Guest
2001–2002	Whattamen	Richard "Richie" Castro	Main role
2001–2002	Magandang Tanghali Bayan	Host	Last TV appearance

== Awards and recognition ==
=== Public service awards ===
Year	Award	Organization
1998	Parangal ng Bayan/People's Choice Awardee	People's Choice Philippines
1998	Outstanding Youth Role Model	National Youth Commission
1998	Medal of Honor	KASAMA Foundation
1998	Gawad KKK Outstanding Youth in The Field of Entertainment	National Centennial Commission
1998	Official DECS-CSCA Spokesperson and Role Model for Students and Youth	Department of Education Culture and Sports – CSCA
1999	Philippine National Red Cross Pledge 25 Spokesperson	Philippine National Red Cross
1999	FAMAS Youth Achievement Award	FAMAS
2001	Youth Ambassador	Philippine Youth

=== Film and television awards ===
Year	Film / Television	Organization	Award	Result
1997	Paano Ang Puso Ko?	PMPC Star Awards for Movies	Best New Actor	Nominated
1998	Maalaala Mo Kaya Shades	12th Star Awards for TV	Single Performance by an Actor	Nominated
1998	Kay Tagal kang Hinintay	FAMAS	Best Actor	Nominated
2003	Got 2 Believe	FAMAS	Best Actor	Nominated
2003	Got 2 Believe	21st FAP Awards	Best Actor	Nominated

=== Other awards ===
Year	Award
1997	Best Male Star – Kislap Magazine
1997	Best Male Star – Movie Star Magazine
1997	Most Popular Young Male Star – Movie Star Magazine
1998	Most Popular Love Team – Rico Yan and Judy Ann Santos (Pabonggahan sa Moviestar'98),
