= Wowie de Guzman =

Filipino actor and dancer

- Born: Jeffrey Camangyan; September 22, 1976 (age 50); Olongapo, Philippines
- Occupations: Actor; dancer
- Years active: 1993–2018
- Spouse: Sheryl Ann Reyes (m. 2012; died 2014)
- Children: 1
- Relatives: Gino Paul Guzman (cousin); Jaypee de Guzman (cousin); Jackie De Guzman (cousin); Arlene De Guzman (cousin); Katherine Annwen de Guzman (cousin); Maria Chona Princesa de Guzman (cousin); Arman De Guzman (cousin)

Jeffrey Camangyan (born September 22, 1976), known professionally as Wowie de Guzman, is a Filipino dancer and a stage, film and TV actor. He was one of the top matinee idols from the 1990s. His break came as a member of dance group Universal Motion Dancers (UMD). He was nominated as Best Actor for FAMAS Award 1998 in Paano Ang Puso Ko?.

== Career ==
De Guzman was a famous member of dance group Universal Motion Dancers along with Brian Furlow, Jim Salas, James Salas, the late Gerard Faisan, Marco McKinley, Norman Santos, Gerry Oliva and Miggy Tanchanco.

He was the first love team of Judy Ann Santos. The Juday-Wowie love team became the number one screen tandem in the mid to late '90s. They paired in movies which were box office hits such as Sana Naman, Kung Alam Mo Lang, Wow Multo, Mara Clara: The Movie, Esperanza: The Movie, Paano Ang Puso Ko?, Muling Ibalik ang Tamis ng Pag-ibig, Kasal-Kasalan, Sakal-Sakalan, Dito Sa Puso Ko and many others. They also paired in TV series like Mara Clara and Esperanza.

He became a stage actor of Gantimpala Theater Foundation. He played in Florante at Laura, Ibong Adarna, El Filibusterismo, Noli Me Tangere, The Bomb, Alikabok, Loren Ruiz, Romeo Loves Juliet, and Perlita Ng Silangan. He performed in Tanghalang CCP, Ballet Philippines, and Peta, among others.

In 2008, de Guzman appeared in ABS-CBN's fantasy series Kung Fu Kids.

== Personal life ==
De Guzman was Judy Ann Santos' first boyfriend; they have since made 12 films together.

He married his non-showbiz wife Sheryl Ann Reyes from Pampanga in 2012. Reyes died on April 26, 2014, at the age of 27, one month after giving birth to their first child. It was reported that the probable cause of death was triggered by medicine which she took after suffering from muscle pain.

In October 2026, de Guzman was injured after the car he was driving crashed into concrete barriers along Maharlika Highway in Santo Tomas, Batangas.

== Filmography ==
=== Film ===
- Anak ng Pasig (1993)
- Sige, Ihataw Mo! (Dancin' with the Motion): The Movie (1994)
- Ibigay Mo Ng Todong-todo (1995)
- Sana Naman (1996)
- Kung Alam Mo Lang (1996)
- Mara Clara: The Movie (1996)
- Nasaan Ka Ng Kailangan Kita (1996)
- Ipaglaban Mo 2: The Movie (1997)
- Langit Sa Piling Mo (1997)
- Isinakdal Ko ang Aking Ina (1997)
- Wow... Multo! (1997)
- Paano Ang Puso Ko? (1997)
- Muling Ibalik ang Tamis ng Pag-ibig (1998)
- Kasal-Kasalan (Sakalan) (1998)
- My Pledge of Love (1999)
- Dito Sa Puso Ko (1999)
- Weder-Weder Lang 'Yan (1999)
- Esperanza: The Movie (1999)
- Tabi Tabi Po! (2001)
- Carta Alas... Huwag Ka Ng Humirit (2001)
- Luv Text (2001)
- Malikmata (2003)
- Lilay: Darling of the Crowd (2010)
- Dormitoryo: Mga Walang Katapusang Kwarto (2017)

=== Television ===
Year	Title	Role
1993–1997	Mara Clara	Christian
1995–2001	ASAP	Himself / Performer
1995–2002	Bubble Gang	
1996	Mukha ng Buhay	Enrique
1996	Gimik	Warren
1996	Calvento Files: In the Company of Sharks	
1996–1999	Super Laff-In	
1997	Maalaala Mo Kaya: Vodka	Glenn
1997	Calvento Files: Criminal Encounters of a Strange Sex [aka Encounters of a Homosexual]	
1997–1999	Esperanza	Anton Montejo
1998	Kapag May Katawiran: Ipaglaban Mo: Juvenile Deliquents	Ross
1998–2003	Magandang Tanghali Bayan	Co-host
1999	Star Drama Theater: Wowie	
1999	Ang Munting Paraiso	Omar
1999	Click	Hector
2000	Kagat ng Dilim	Various
2000	Umulan Man o Umaraw	Darren
2001	!Oka Tokat: Forest Fright	Simon
2005	Qpids	
2007	Maalaala Mo Kaya: Telebisyon	Buboy
2008	Kung Fu Kids	Waldo Ramos Sr.
2010	Maalaala Mo Kaya: Kuliglig	Manny's brother
2010	Rubi	Cayetano
2011	Maalaala Mo Kaya: Palengke	Jimmy
2012	Wansapanataym: Magic Shoes	Daddy
2012	Maalaala Mo Kaya: Apoy	Itoy
2012–2013	Enchanted Garden	Gaston
2013	Little Champ	Bondoc
2014	Yagit	Chito Asuncion
2014	Pepito Manaloto	Anthony
2015	Magpakailanman	
2016	Sinungaling Mong Puso	Mario Villafuerte
2017	Meant to Be	Owep
2017	La Luna Sangre	Benjie (Luna Officer)
2018	Wowowin	Guest Performer
2018	Stories for the Soul	
2018	Tadhana	
2018	Dear Uge	

== Discography ==
- "Wala ng Mahihiling Pa" - 1998 movie soundtrack in Kasal-Kasalan (Sakalan)
