= Ora Engkantada =

- Genre: Fantasy
- Created by: Intercontinental Broadcasting Corporation
- Presented by: Luz Fernandez
- Country of origin: Philippines
- Original language: Filipino
- No. of episodes: n/a

Production
- Running time: 30 minutes

Original release
- Network: IBC (1986–1988); RPN (1988–1990)
- Release: 1986 – 1990
- Release: November 9, 1996 – 1998

Ora Engkantada is a Philippine television drama fantasy anthology series broadcast by IBC and RPN. Starring Luz Fernandez, it aired on IBC from 1986 to 1990. The show moved to RPN from 1996 to 1998.
