= Dahil Mahal Na Mahal Kita =

Christian Madarang Ardeña

Dahil Mahal na Mahal Kita
- Directed by: Wenn V. Deramas
- Written by: Mari L. Mariano
- Produced by: Charo Santos-Concio; Malou N. Santos
- Starring: Claudine Barretto; Rico Yan; Diether Ocampo
- Cinematography: Ding Achacoso
- Edited by: Joyce Bernal
- Music by: Eric Antonio
- Production company: Star Cinema
- Release date: June 24, 1998
- Running time: 111 minutes
- Country: Philippines
- Language: Filipino

Dahil Mahal na Mahal Kita (lit. 'Because I Love You Very Much') is a 1998 Filipino romantic drama film directed by Wenn V. Deramas (in his feature film directorial debut) from a story and screenplay written by Mari L. Mariano. The film stars Claudine Barretto, Rico Yan and Diether Ocampo, with the supporting cast includes Jaclyn Jose and Princess Punzalan. The film received a grade of "A" by the Cinema Evaluation Board.

Produced and distributed by Star Cinema, the film was theatrically released on June 24, 1998.

== Plot ==
Mela (Barretto) is known as a "Bad Girl" on campus, but beneath her bold exterior lies a sensitive and vulnerable soul. She has a painful past, with her mother dying young and her father turning to alcoholism and abuse. Mela runs away to live with her kind-hearted aunt, who, despite being a mistress, is loving and supportive. Mela constantly seeks acceptance and satisfaction in relationships with different boys.

Mela's current boyfriend, Ryan (Ocampo), struggles with his relationship with his father and finds emotional support in his mother. As the youngest and only boy among three children, Ryan starts off as friends with Mela before they become a couple. However, Ryan soon becomes unfaithful.

Determined to change her destiny, Mela seeks out "Mr. Perfect," who is Miguel (Yan). Miguel is rich, intelligent, and well-mannered, embodying the classic aristocrat. He is formal, businesslike, and somewhat snobbish, which can be off-putting despite his appeal. Miguel's main flaw is his rigid self-discipline. He serves on the school's discipline committee and helps manage his family's business. Having lost his father at a young age, Miguel was raised by his mother, and his brother died of a broken heart from a troubled marriage.

Mela targets Miguel, who initially ignores her. Persistent, she challenges him to a bet, resulting in him having to spend a weekend with her. Although hesitant at first, Miguel ends up enjoying Mela's company. During their time together, he sees her true beauty and falls deeply in love.

Love leads Mela to change her style and behavior to please Miguel. She tries to fit in with his friends and family. However, Miguel's friends are skeptical of her transformation, and his mother disapproves of their relationship, causing tension.

Miguel, pressured by his friends, does not invite Mela to his birthday party. She surprises him by showing up and learns she wasn't welcome, making Miguel feel guilty. Ryan tries to win Mela back by setting up a compromising situation, recording a video to make her appear as if she's cheating. The video is shown to everyone at school, ruining her reputation. Feeling betrayed, Miguel ends their relationship.

Mela denies the cheating accusations but finds out the scandal was orchestrated by Miguel's ex-girlfriend, Cory. She confronts Cory, resulting in a fight that leads to Mela's suspension and being labeled an outcast. After breaking up with Miguel, Mela reverts to her wild, self-destructive behavior. Ryan, feeling guilty, attempts to make amends but is rejected.

Miguel observes Mela's behavior and begins to doubt the cheating accusation, realizing she truly loved him. To make amends, he defies his mother and defends Mela, appealing against her expulsion. Although he succeeds in getting her reinstated, Mela does not forgive him.

After Miguel repeatedly seeks her forgiveness, they eventually reconcile and resume their relationship.

== Cast and characters ==
- Claudine Barretto as Carmela "Mela" Ocampo
- Rico Yan as Miguel Quirino
- Diether Ocampo as Ryan
- Jaclyn Jose as Tita Myrna
- Isabel Rivas as Mrs. Suzanne Quirino
- Jan Marini as Jam
- Lailani Navarro as Cory
- Marita Zobel as Ryan's mother
- Lito Legaspi as Ryan's father
- Farrah Florer as Miguel's sister-in-law
- Donnie Fernandez as Manny
- Lui Villaruz as Bobby
- CJ Tolentino as Paolo
- Princess Punzalan as school dean (special participation)

== Original story ==
The original story for this movie is lifted from the Maalaala Mo Kaya episode titled "Billiards" which starred Giselle "G" Toengi and Matthew Mendoza. Coincidentally, Jan Marini also played the female protagonist's best friend. The movie had an original working title of Bad Girl but Star Cinema executives changed the title to avoid confusion with the 1991 film Bad Girl, which was produced as a sexy film by Regal Films and topbilled by Cristina Gonzales.

== Potential remake ==
In 2017, Viva Entertainment reportedly planned to produce a remake of Dahil Mahal Na Mahal Kita, which would star Julia Barretto (Claudine's real-life niece) and Joshua Garcia, but the project eventually entered development hell and was never released due to reasons still unknown.

In 2025, eight years after the shelved remake of Dahil Mahal Na Mahal Kita, a Gen Z reimagining of the film was conceptualized, with a whole new set of characters and an entirely new storyline inspired by the original film. The new film, now titled Love You So Bad, is a collaboration between Star Cinema, GMA Pictures, and Regal Entertainment, starring former Pinoy Big Brother: Celebrity Collab Edition housemates Will Ashley, Bianca de Vera, and Dustin Yu. Mae Cruz-Alviar, who directed Rewind, will direct it and the new story was written by Crystal Hazel San Miguel, who also wrote Hello, Love, Again. It was announced in August and filming started September. This reimagining is set to be a part of the lineup of the 2025 Metro Manila Film Festival, where it will be released on December 25.
