= Kay Tagal Kang Hinintay (film) =

- Directed by: Rory B. Quintos
- Screenplay by: Olivia M. Lamasan; Mari L. Mariano
- Story by: Mari L. Mariano
- Produced by: Malou N. Santos
- Starring: Judy Ann Santos; Rico Yan
- Cinematography: Joe Batac
- Edited by: Marya Ignacio
- Music by: Nonong Buencamino
- Production company: Star Cinema
- Distributed by: Star Cinema
- Release date: October 14, 1998
- Running time: 105 minutes
- Country: Philippines
- Language: Filipino

Kay Tagal Kang Hinintay (lit. 'How Long I've Been Waiting') is a 1998 Filipino romantic drama film directed by Rory B. Quintos and written by Olivia M. Lamasan and Mari L. Mariano from a story by Mariano. It stars Judy Ann Santos and Rico Yan in the lead roles since they appeared together in Paano ang Puso Ko? a year earlier while supporting cast includes Gloria Sevilla, Dante Rivero, Jennifer Sevilla, and Bernard Palanca.

Produced and distributed by Star Cinema, the film was theatrically released on October 14, 1998. In 2022, the film was digitally restored and remastered in 4K resolution by ABS-CBN Film Restoration and Central Digital Lab.

== Synopsis ==
Ana Cordero is a hardworking advertising secretary and the primary breadwinner of her family, while Alex Medina is a driven entrepreneur with a passion for owning his own restaurant, but has yet to find success in his business ventures.

Ana and Alex had a rocky first encounter in Vigan, but they eventually put aside their differences and became friends during their vacation. As they spent more time together, they developed a strong attraction and admiration for each other. However, Ana, aware of the limitations of their vacation romance, declares that they should end their feelings before returning to their real lives, fearing that there won't be room for love in their everyday routines.

Fate intervenes when Alex spots Ana walking to work in Manila, and he pursues her, inviting her to dinner. They quickly become a couple, deeply in love and supportive of each other's dreams. However, their relationship is soon put to the test as they face differences and sacrifices that challenge their love. Complications arise, including Ana's family, who pressure her to choose between them and Alex, and Sandy, Alex's close friend, who has secretly harbored feelings for him. These obstacles threaten to shake the foundation of their relationship.

== Cast and characters ==
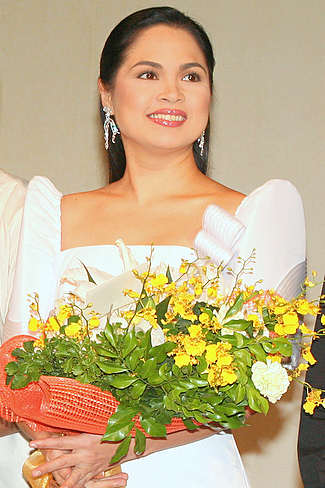
Judy Ann Santos portrays Ana Cordero.

- Judy Ann Santos as Ana Cordero
- Rico Yan as Alex Medina
- Jennifer Sevilla as Sandy
- Dante Rivero as Mr. Medina
- Gloria Sevilla as Manang B
- Eva Darren as Aling Celia
- Nikki Valdez as Rina
- Bernard Palanca as Robin
- William Lorenzo as Jojo
- Yayo Aguila as Letty
- Minnie Aguilar as Nini

== Reception ==
=== Accolades ===
Accolades received by Kay Tagal Kang Hinintay
Year	Award	Category	Recipient(s)	Result	Ref.
1999	47th FAMAS Awards	Best Actress	Judy Ann Santos	Nominated	
1999	47th FAMAS Awards	Best Supporting Actress	Jennifer Sevilla	Nominated	
