= Iukit Mo sa Bala =

Philippine action film

Iukit Mo Sa Bala
- Directed by: Pepe Marcos
- Screenplay by: Jose N. Carreon; Genaro "Nerdy" Cruz
- Story by: Genaro "Nerdy" Cruz
- Produced by: Simon C. Ongpin; Jose Mari Bautista
- Starring: Bong Revilla; Gabby Concepcion; Nanette Medved; Mat Ranillo III
- Cinematography: Danny Bustos
- Edited by: Joe Salle
- Music by: Mon del Rosario
- Production companies: Star Cinema; Megavision Films
- Distributed by: Megavision Films
- Release date: September 14, 1994
- Running time: 100 minutes
- Country: Philippines
- Language: Filipino

Iukit Mo sa Bala! (lit. 'Carve into the Bullet!') is a 1994 Philippine action film directed by Pepe Marcos. Based on the komiks serial of the same name by Genaro "Nerdy" Cruz, the film stars Bong Revilla, Gabby Concepcion, Nanette Medved and Mat Ranillo III. The film revolves around a well-known doctor who vows to take revenge against his family's political rival who engages in criminal activities, including the killing of his father.

== Plot ==
Manila-based surgeon Dr. Roberto "Bobby" Guerrero rushes home to his hometown of San Roque after hearing that his father, town mayor Roman, was injured during a gunfight that killed Edmond Velez, son of Roman's political rival Congressman Velez. A furious Congressman Velez wants to seek justice for Edmond's death. So his other son Reyland orders his men to kill Roman, who was recuperating at the hospital.

During Edmond's wake, Bobby sees his ex-girlfriend Noemi, now Rico Velez's partner. Talking with Noemi's mother, Bobby finds out that Rico raped Noemi. Reyland is arrested after one of his men, Torralba, told the cops that he ordered Roman killed. Rico then devises a rescue plan for Reyland: His men attack the police station and free Reyland, then kill Torralba. But Roman himself thwarts the assault and kills Reyland by blowing up his getaway car.

With two of his brothers killed, Rico then formulates a plan to kill Roman. At the municipal hall, two policemen invite Roman to the Provincial Police Office to discuss his feud with Congressman Velez. The car stops en route to the Provincial Police Office, and the cops shoot Roman. Bobby and Paolo, following the vehicle, arrive too late to revive Roman. It was later found out that Rico had two men disguise themselves as police officers to lure Roman to his death. Rico then kills the gunmen after paying them.

With Roman dead, Vice Mayor Mario Ocampo takes over as mayor—signifying Congressman Velez's full control of San Roque. Irked by Bobby's apparent cowardice, a furious Paolo opens fire at the new mayor during a party, but Rico shoots him from inside the municipal hall. Bobby arrives too late to save his brother. Overhearing Rico's conversation with his father, Noemi warns Bobby to leave San Roque before it is too late.

With the deaths of his father and his brother, Bobby prepares to make Congressman Velez pay for his sins. In response, Congressman Velez has Mario sue Bobby and set up checkpoints on all roads leaving San Roque. Mario and some police officers arrive to arrest Bobby, who fights back; Norma gets injured in the gunfire, and she and Bobby hide in an abandoned warehouse.

Bobby infiltrates Congressman Velez's house and takes Noemi out. She tells Norma that the Velezes will not stop until they kill Bobby. Norma then implores Bobby to stop seeking revenge and return to Manila. But he rebuffs his mother, insisting that while the Velezes are still alive, the bloodshed will never end.

Congressman Velez is surprised upon seeing Bobby while attending mass. He then pleads for his life, but is shot dead by Bobby after trying to pull out his own gun. Rico and Mario arrive, and one of Mario's men tells them that he had found Bobby's hideout. Now trying to avenge his father's death, Rico joins Mario and his men in the attack. During the gunfight, Mario kills Norma and takes Noemi hostage. Rico tells Mario to let Bobby see Noemi get killed, but a wounded Bobby shoots the two antagonists dead.

A voiceover indicates that Bobby survived, but he was charged and convicted for his crimes. The court then gave him a minimum sentence considering the reason behind his actions.

== Cast ==
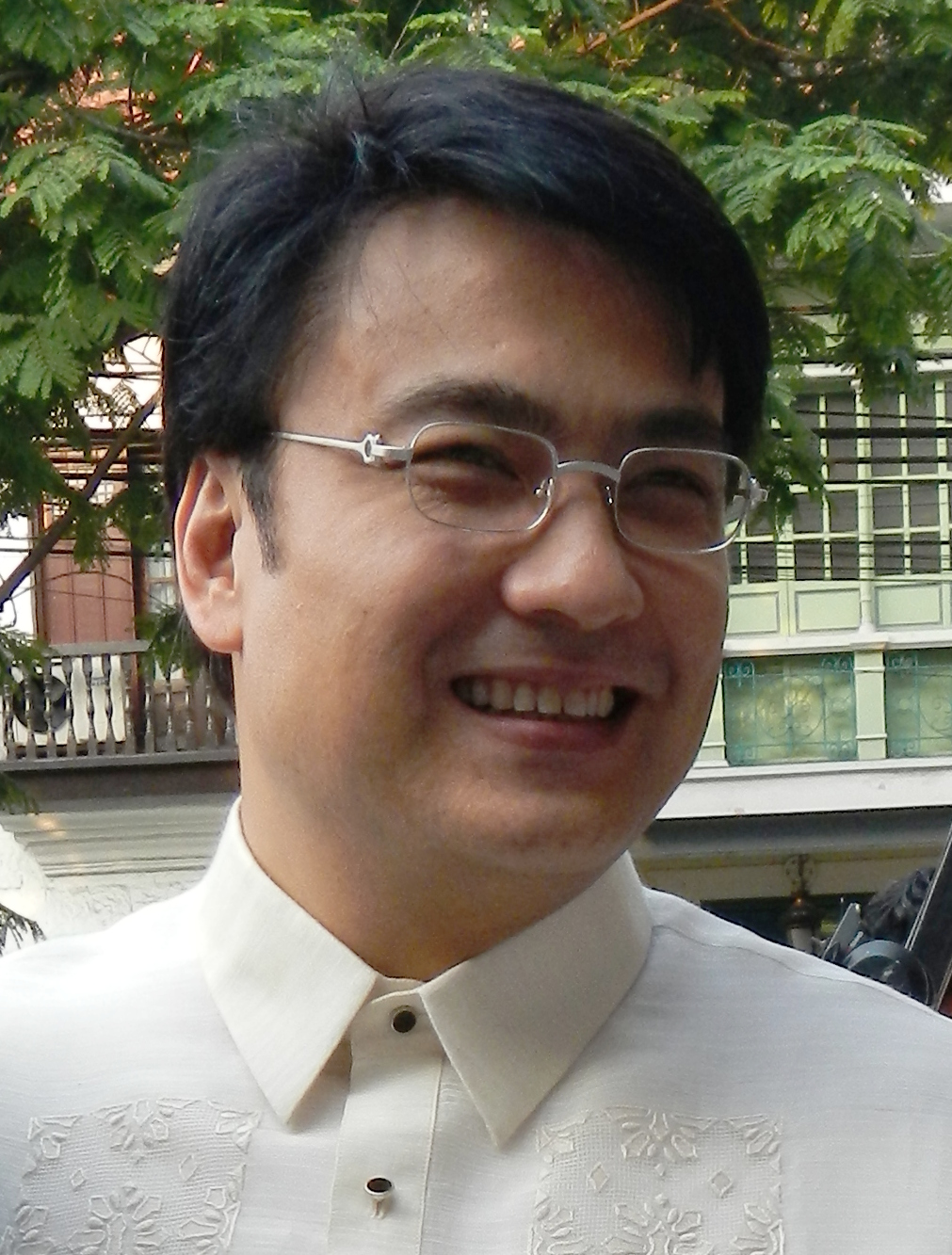
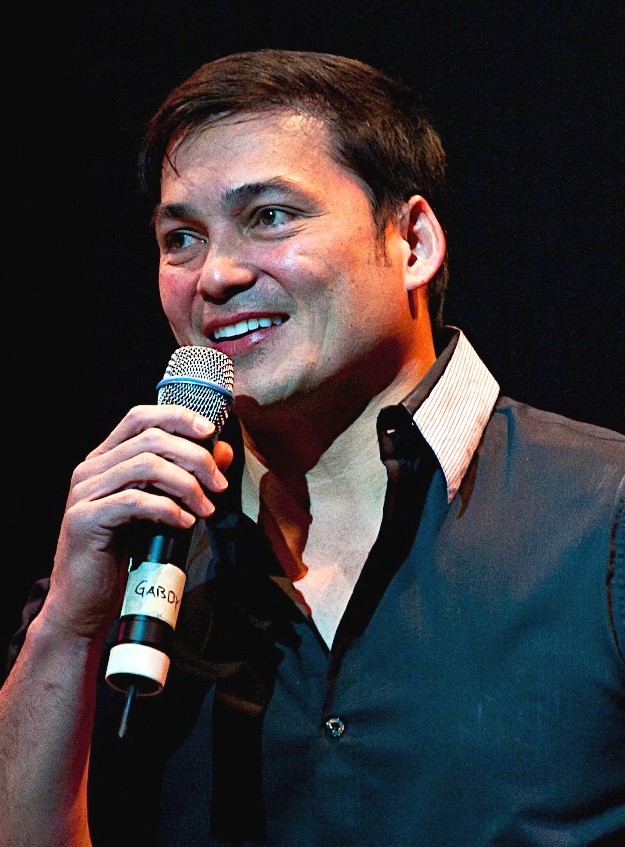
Ramon "Bong" Revilla Jr. (left), Gabby Concepcion (right) and Nanette Medved (below) respectively played the roles of Dr. Roberto "Bobby" Guerrero, a doctor-turned-vigilante, Rico Velez, a druglord politician and Noemi, Bobby's girlfriend and businesswoman.
- Bong Revilla as Dr. Roberto "Bobby" Y. Guerrero
- Gabby Concepcion as Rico Velez
- Nanette Medved as Noemi
- Mat Ranillo III as Vice Mayor Mario Ocampo
- Luis Gonzales as Mayor Roman S. Guerrero
- Marita Zobel as Norma Y. Guerrero
- Lito Legaspi as Cong. Velez
- Kevin Delgado as Edmond Velez
- Edgar Mande as Rayland Velez
- Fredmoore delos Santos as Paolo Y. Guerrero
- King Gutierrez as Simon
- Renato del Prado as Julian
- Brando Legaspi as Alex
- Tony Mabesa as Padre Celso
- Romy Romulo as Chief of Police
- Rommel Valdez as Torralba
- Perla Bautista as Mely, Noemi's mother

== Production ==
Bong Revilla, who co-produced the film, stated that the film has a bigger budget than Ronquillo, his first film with Star Cinema. Nanette Medved decided to finish shooting the film after she backed out from a film produced by Carlo J. Caparas due to scheduling conflicts.

== Release ==
The film was slated to be released in early July. However, it didn't push through because of the controversy involving Gabby Concepcion and Nanette Medved at the 1994 Manila Film Festival, resulting in them being temporarily banned from the theaters. It was finally released in September.
