= Marita Zobel =

Filipino actress (born 1941)

Marita Zóbel
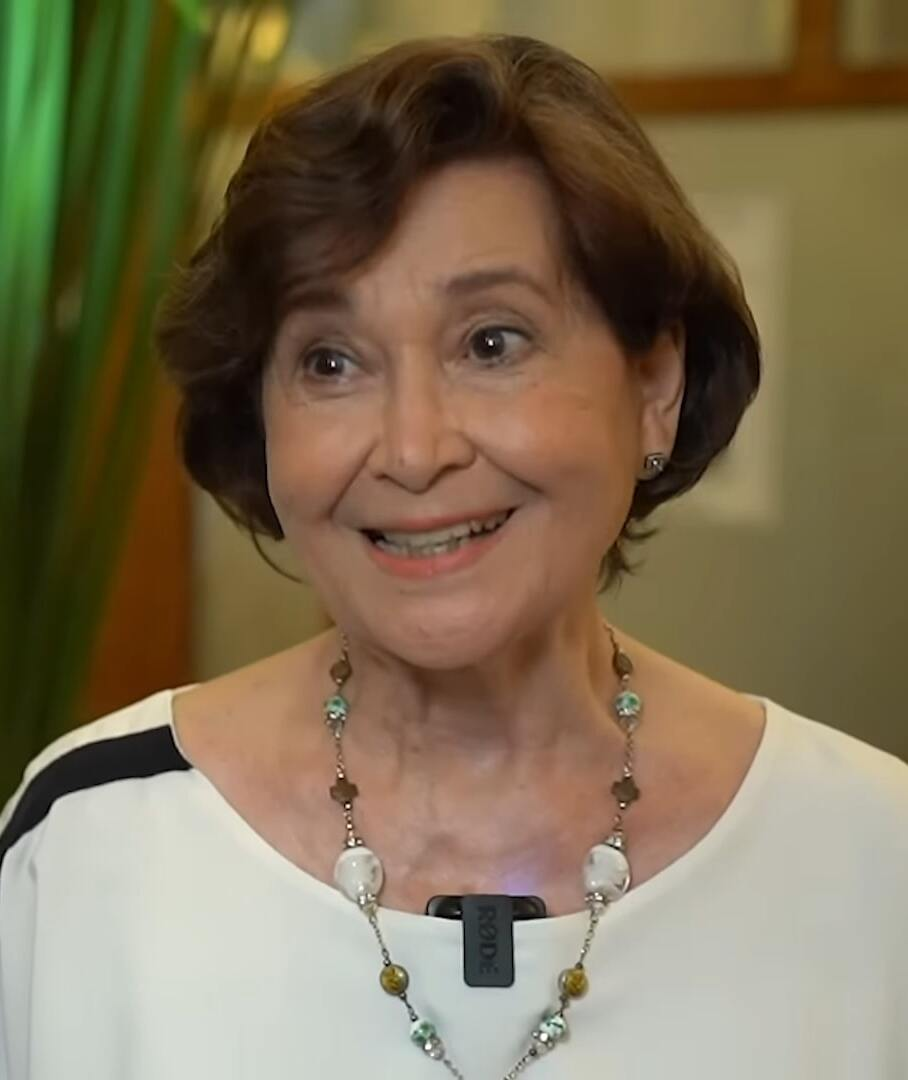
- Zobel in 2022
- Born: Mary Ann Blanch y Respall; June 18, 1941 (age 85); Iloilo City, Commonwealth of the Philippines
- Occupation: Actress
- Years active: 1957–present
- Spouse: Reynaldo Roxas Sr. (m. 1961)
- Children: Reynaldo Jr. Raymond; Maria Cecilia; Robert; Marita Lourdes; Reymar Paul

Mary Ann Blanch de Roxas (née Blanch y Respall, born June 18, 1941), better known by her screen name Marita Zóbel, is a Filipina actress. She was an LVN Pictures contract star.

== Filmography ==
=== Film ===
Year	Title	Role(s)	Notes
1957	Bad Boy		
1958	Faithful	Linda	
1958	Barkada		
1958	Limang Dalangin		
1959	Sparring Partner		
1959	Cover Girl		
1959	Mr. Announcer		"Alaala Ko Pa" segment
1959	Maturan at Lagman		
1959	Biyaya ng Lupa	Angelita	
1960	Emily		
1960	Botika sa Baryo		
1960	Si Marita at ang Pitong Duwende	Marita	
1960	Doon Po sa Amin		
1961	Prinsipe Diomedes at ang Mahiwagang Gitara		
1961	Tanglaw sa Dilim		
1961	Malditong Banal		
1961	Sikat Na, Siga Pa		
1981	Gaano Kita Kamahal		
1984	Sa Hirap at Ginhawa		
1986	Tu-yay and His Magic Payong	Marita	
1987	Puto	Aling Loleng	
1987	Walang Karugtong ang Nakaraan	Malou's mother	
1988	Boy Negro	Mrs. Ramirez	
1988	Natutulog Pa ang Diyos	Rose Velasco	
1988	Pik Pak Boom	Marie's mother	"Manyika" segment
1989	3 Mukha ng Pag-ibig	Mrs. Celia Ortiz	"I Love You, Moomoo" segment
1989	Valentina		
1989	Dear Diary	Helen Tacorda	"Dear Killer" segment
1990	"Ako ang Batas" -Gen. Tomas Karingal	Mrs. Karingal	
1990	Too Young	Elena Montenegro	
1990	Ama, Bakit Mo Ako Pinabayaan?	Mila	
1991	Uubusin Ko ang Lahi Mo	Pacita Guerrero	
1991	Kaputol ng Isang Awit	Vina Montesa	
1991	Contreras Gang	Mrs. Contreras	
1992	Emong Verdadero: Tatak ng Cebu II (Bala ng Ganti)		
1992	Jaime Labrador: Sakristan Mayor	Toyang	
1992	Boy Recto	Aling Chayong	
1993	Lethal Panther 2	Albert's mother	
1993	The Myrna Diones Story: Lord, Have Mercy!		
1993	May Minamahal	Gloria	
1993	Gaano Kita Kamahal		
1994	Bakit Ngayon Ka Lang		
1994	The Maggie dela Riva Story: God... Why Me?	Dolores Jose	
1994	Iukit Mo sa Bala	Norma Guerrero	
1995	Nena	Judge Engracia	
1995	Victim No. 1: Delia Maga (Jesus, Pray for Us!) – A Massacre in Singapore		
1995	Dahas	Aling Gracia	
1996	Dyesebel	Issa	
1996	Maruja	Doña Binday	
1996	Kristo	Woman in Jerusalem	
1996	Leon Cordero	Meding	
1996	Totoy Hitman	Carmen	
1997	Nag-iisang Ikaw	Martha Alejo	
1997	Isinakdal Ko ang Aking Ina	Luisa	
1997	Bobby Barbers: Parak	Bobby's mother	
1997	Alindog ng Lahi	Anastacia	
1997	Paano ang Puso Ko?	Pilar	
1997	I Do? I Die! (D'yos Ko Day!)	Bernie's mother	
1997	FLAMES The Movie: Pangako	Mrs. Ronquillo	
1997	Ipaglaban Mo 2: The Movie	Gerard's mother	
1997	Ang Probinsyano	Mrs. Bernardo	
1998	Ama Namin	Ester de Dios	
1998	Dahil Mahal na Mahal Kita	Ryan's mother	
2000	Ang Dalubhasa	Menchu's mother	
2000	Kailangan Ko'y Ikaw	Francine's mother	
2002	Mahal Kita, Final Answer	Benito's mother	
2003	Chavit	Caridad Crisologo	
2004	Animal	Mother of Cherry & Sandra	Shot in 1999
2006	Mother Nanny	Lola Tersing	
2008	Caregiver	Nemie	
2013	Islands		
2015	Everyday I Love You	Lola Maricar	
2015	Angela Markado	Lola Maring	
2016	Dagsin		
2018	Aurora		
2021	A Hard Day	Lydia	

=== Television ===
Year	Title	Role(s)	Type of Role	Note
1987	Balintataw		Supporting role	Episode: "Laro Tayo ng Ku"
1996–2002	F.L.A.M.E.S.	Mrs. Ronquillo	Main role	
1999–2002	G-mik	Lola Seling	Supporting role	
2000	May Bukas Pa	Doña Felisa	Special participation / Antagonist	
2000–2001	May Bukas Pa	Doña Felisa	Special participation / Antagonist	
2001–2003	Sana ay Ikaw na Nga	Mona	Extended role	
2003	Wansapanataym			Episode: "Magic Mantel"
2005	Ikaw ang Lahat sa Akin	Yolanda's Mother	Supporting role / Antagonist	
2011	Babaeng Hampaslupa	Elizabeth Wong	Supporting role	
2011–2012	Munting Heredera	Veronica	Guest appearance / Protagonist	
2012	Alice Bungisngis and her Wonder Walis	Tandang Alicia	Special participation / Protagonist	
2012–2013	Enchanted Garden	Queen Jasmina	Extended role	
2013	Home Sweet Home	Old Woman	Recurring role / Antagonist	
2014	Ikaw Lamang	Melinda Del Carmen	Guest appearance	
2014–2019	Magpakailanman	Celia; Lola Lelang	Episode guest	2 episodes "My Psychotic Husband" "Tatlong Henerasyon ng Sipag at Tiyaga"
2015	Pari 'Koy	Conchita Banal	Guest appearance / Protagonist	
2016	The Story of Us	Martha Cristobal	Additional Cast	
2017	Destined to be Yours	Charito	Extended role / Protagonist	
2020	Ang Pagbabalik ng Ibong Adarna	Herself		Documentary
