= Totoy Hitman: Batas Ko ang Hahatol =

Philippine action film

- Directed by: Pepe Marcos
- Screenplay by: Henry Nadong; Cris Pablo
- Produced by: Orly Ilacad
- Starring: Ian Veneracion
- Cinematography: Danny Bustos
- Edited by: Pepe Marcos
- Music by: Edwin "Kiko" Ortega
- Production companies: OctoArts Films; Cinemax Studios
- Distributed by: OctoArts Films
- Release date: December 2, 1996
- Running time: 95 minutes
- Country: Philippines
- Language: Filipino

Totoy Hitman: Batas Ko ang Hahatol (lit. 'My law will be [the one] judging') is a 1996 Filipino action film edited and directed by Pepe Marcos. The film stars Ian Veneracion in the title role.

== Cast ==
- Ian Veneracion as Totoy
- Edu Manzano as Allan
- Jennifer Mendoza as Melissa
- Jorge Estregan as Ismael
- Lara Morena as Hilda
- Celina Cortez as Karen
- Lito Legaspi as Anton
- Charlie Davao as Miguel
- Roldan Aquino as Col. Mercado
- Levi Ignacio as Allan's Aide
- Marita Zobel as Carmen
- Pocholo Montes as Gen. Dionisio
- Zandro Zamora as Jessie
- Johnny Vicar as Santiago
- Rhey Roldan as Hostagetaker
- Jim Rosales as Totoy's Father
- Robert Rivera as Delfin
