= Lito Legaspi =

Filipino actor (1941–2019)

- Born: Ludovico Angeles Legaspi; September 10, 1941; Marikina, Rizal, Philippine Commonwealth
- Died: September 8, 2019 (aged 77); San Juan, Metro Manila, Philippines
- Resting place: Caryana Monastery, Magalang, Pampanga, Philippines
- Occupation: Actor
- Years active: 1959–2019
- Height: 5 ft 11 in (180 cm)
- Children: Zoren; Kier; Brando

Lito Legaspi (born Ludovico Angeles Legaspi; September 10, 1941 – September 8, 2019) was a Filipino actor both in film and television in the Philippines. He was the father of actors Zoren Legaspi, Kier Legaspi, and Brando Legaspi. He won the Gawad Urian Award for Best Supporting Actor in Sinong Kapiling? Sinong Kasiping? (1977).

== Early life ==
Ludovico Legaspi was born in Marikina, Rizal to Augusto Legaspi and Florentino Angeles. He had ten siblings, namely Mori, Mario, Bely, Boy, Resty, Charing, Procer, Lita, Marylynne and Marissa.

== Early career ==
He appeared in 1959 comedy film Ipinagbili Kami ng Aming Tatay, starring Dolphy. In 1963, Sampaguita Pictures introduced Legaspi together with teenage stars such as Rosemarie Sonora, Gina Pareño, Dindo Fernando, Pepito Rodriguez, Romeo Rivera and Bert Leroy, Jr., among others. Legaspi made his debut in Sampaguita Pictures' Lab Na Lab Kita alongside Susan Roces then appeared in Joey, Eddie and Lito, paired with Liberty Ilagan. He became a matinee idol like Eddie Gutierrez, Jose Mari Gonzales, Romeo Vasquez, Greg Martin and Juancho Gutierrez.

After his contract with Sampaguita expired, he went freelancing in the 1970s. He played an impotent husband in the film Uhaw (1970) with Merle Fernandez and Tito Galla, directed by Ruben Abalos.

== Later career ==
He played Mayor Joaquin Montejo in Esperanza on ABS-CBN, starring Judy Ann Santos in 1997. He also played as governor in Makapiling Kang Muli, GMA Network's primetime television series.

As a veteran actor, he appeared in more than 120 movies and television shows since 1959.

He was inducted to the Eastwood City Walk of Fame in December 2014 for his contribution in film and TV acting.

== Personal life ==
Legaspi had 3 children with Hershey, Zoren, Kier and Brando who are also prospective movie actors. His daughter-in-law (Zoren's wife), Carmina Villarroel-Legaspi is an actress and TV presenter. His grandchildren, fraternal twins Maverick and Cassandra (children of Zoren and Carmina) and Dani Barretto (daughter of Kier and actress Marjorie Barretto) are in show business as well. In 2019, Dani Barretto wed Xavi Panlilio with child Millie, born in 2019.

== Health and death ==
On September 6, 2019, Legaspi was rushed to the Cardinal Santos Memorial Medical Center after having chest pains. He later died from cardiac arrest and was pronounced dead at around 10:00 AM on September 8, 2019, two days before his 78th birthday. He was buried at Caryana Monastery in Magalang, Pampanga.

== Selected filmography ==
=== Film ===
Year	Title	Role	Notes
1959	Wedding Bells	Lito	
1961	Joey, Eddie, Lito	Lito	
1963	Ang Class Reunion	Joselito Moran	
1970	Marupok		
1976	Escolta; Mayo 13; Biyernes ng Hapon!		
1977	Sinong Kapiling? Sinong Kasiping?		
1977	Banta ng Kahapon		
1989	Limang Daliri ng Diyos		
1989	Boots Oyson: Sa Katawan Mo, Aagos ang Dugo	Hepe	
1990	Alyas Baby Face		
1990	Angel Cremenal	Attorney Savedra	
1990	Alyas Baby Face		
1991	Markang Bungo: The Bobby Ortega Story	Col. Manuel Ordoñez	
1991	Kung Patatawarin Ka ng Bala Ko!	Roman	
1992	Kapatid Ko si Hudas	Don Ramon Cordova	
1992	Mario Sandoval	Mr. Retareno	
1993	Tikboy Tikas at Mga Khroaks Boys	Judge Rafael Montejo	
1993	Pugoy – Hostage: Davao	Mayor Antonio Duwalde	
1993	Mancao	Mayor	
1994	Bawal Na Gamot		
1994	The Maggie dela Riva Story: God... Why Me?	Col. Tomas Karingal	
1994	Iukit Mo sa Bala	Congressman Velez	
1994	Col. Billy Bibit, RAM	Ret. Col. Sabello Bibit	
1995	Judge Max Asuncion: Hukom Bitay	Col. Orlando Aberilla	
1995	Iligpit Si Bobby Ortega: Markang Bungo 2	Col. Manuel Ordoñez	
1995	Asero	Col. Marino	
1996	Itataya Ko ang Buhay Ko	Col. Sabino	
1996	SPO4 Santiago: Sharpshooter	Col. Deogracias D'Bayan	
1996	Totoy Hitman	Anton	
1997	Paano ang Puso Ko?	Cesar	
1997	Cobra		
1997	Sambahin ang Puri Ko		
1997	Kulang Ka Lang sa Lambing		
1998	Dahil Mahal Na Mahal Kita	Ryan's father	
1998	Init ng Dugo	Don Conrado	
1999	Tigasin	Col. Rodolfo Angeles	
1999	Linlang		
1999	Esperanza: The Movie	Mayor Joaquin Montejo	
2003	Lastikman	Larry's father	
2005	Terrorist Hunter	Gen. Cruz	
2011	Catch Me, I'm in Love	Mr. Morales	
2012	Every Breath U Take	Leo's dad	

=== Television ===
Year	Title	Role
1987	Agila	Recurring Role
1997–1998	Esperanza	Mayor Joaquin Montejo
1998	Bayani	José Abad Santos
1999	Tabing Ilog	Francisco Ledesma
2004	Hiram	Don Felipe Verdadero
2008	Komiks Presents: Dragonna	Recurring Role
2008	Eva Fonda	Toshiro Fonda
2009	The Wedding	Lawrence
2010	I Love Betty La Fea	Virgilio Arellano
2010	Precious Hearts Romances Presents: Kristine	Don Leon Fortalejo
2011	Mula sa Puso	Luis Vergara
2012	The Good Daughter	Miguel Guevarra
2012	Makapiling Kang Muli	Governor
2012	Isang Dakot na Luha	Mr. Vergara
2013	Genesis	Manuel Macalintal
2013	Bukas na Lang Kita Mamahalin	Melchor Antonio
2013	Jim Fernandez's Galema, Anak Ni Zuma	Agustin Carriedo
2014	Niño	Manuel Reyes
2014	Ilustrado	Padre Amado
2015	Marimar	Don Fernando Aldama
2016	Princess in the Palace	Manuel Gonzaga
2016	Ika-6 na Utos	Allan
2017	FPJ's Ang Probinsyano	Jonathan Wu
2017	Haplos	Eduardo "Lolo Doods" Dizon
2018–2019	My Special Tatay	Simon Villaroman (his last appearance)
