= Marilyn Villamayor =

Filipino actress, host, and singer

Marilyn Villamayor is a Filipino actress, host, singer and producer. She was a former teen star and host of That's Entertainment on GMA Network in the late 1980s and early 1990s. She was introduced in the "Superstar" show when she was 14 years old and hosted a television show, Lotlot and friends, and Dr. Potpot and the Satellite Kid, together with her cousins Lotlot de Leon and Ian de Leon. She also appeared in a number of feature films.

== Filmography ==
=== Film ===
- Sa Lungga ng Mga Daga (1978)
- Ma'am May We Go Out? (1985)
- Halimaw sa Banga (1986)
- Tatlong Ina, Isang Anak (1987)
- Takot Ako, Eh! (1987)
- Nakausap Ko ang Birhen (1988)
- Bobo Cop (1988)
- Bagwis (1990)
- Feel Na Feel (1990)
- Hotdog (1990)
- Ang Buhay ni Pacita M. (1991)

=== Television guest appearances ===
- Lovingly Yours, Helen
- Maalaala Mo Kaya as Belen, date aired January 21, 2017
- Pera at Diploma (1991)
- Mr. Kupido
- Ipaglaban Mo
- Kris
- SIS
- Young Love, Sweet Love
- Eat Bulaga
- Lunch Date
- Kwarta o Kahon
- Teysi ng Tahanan
- Coney Reyes on Camera
- Walang Tulugan , 2016
- Maynila
- "My Dear Heart" as Teresa, date aired February 7 and 8, 2017
- Magpakailanman
- Dear Uge
- FPJs Ang Probinsyano

=== TV series ===
- Lotlot and Friends (1987)
- Dr. Potpot and the Satellite Kid (1985) as Maxi
- Bridges of Love (2015) as Mama Chanda
- My Fair Lady (Philippine Version) 2015 as Violy
