= Luz Fernandez =

Filipino actress (1935–2022)

- Born: Luzviminda Fernandez; July 13, 1935; Manila, Insular Government of the Philippine Islands, United States
- Died: March 5, 2022 (aged 86); Marikina, Philippines
- Resting place: Loyola Memorial Park, Marikina, Metro Manila
- Years active: 1950–2022
- Known for: Role of Lola Basyang in radio dramas
- Notable work: Ora Engkantada; Okay Ka, Fairy Ko!

Luzviminda Fernandez (July 13, 1935 – March 5, 2022), better known professionally as Luz Fernandez, was a Filipino actress and television presenter. She was a long-time radio actress for DZRH who also did acting for film, television, and theater.

== Career ==
=== Radio ===
Fernandez first received public attention as a radio actress for Metropolitan Broadcasting Company (MBC; now Manila Broadcasting Company). Fernandez spent her entire radio career working for MBC's station, DZRH which she joined in the 1950s. Her stay with DZRH lasted for 64 years. She frequently did radio work with Augusto Victa and Tiya Dely. Fernandez was frequently cast in antagonistic roles in radio dramas although her most noted role was "Lola Basyang", a caring grandmother character who teaches children morals through stories. Fernandez did work for around 30 radio dramas for DZRH. In 2009, she was honored with the "Best Actress of All Time" title by DZRH on its 70th anniversary.

=== Television and film ===
Fernandez also did acting roles for television and feature films. Among her noted roles was as Lola Torya in the 1980s children's fantasy series Ora Engkantada which originally aired by IBC and as the evil fairy Luka in the fantasy-sitcom series Okay Ka, Fairy Ko!. She would also appear in Pepito Manaloto, Kambal, Karibal, and Amaya.

One of her earlier films was Rodrigo de Villa, a co-production between LVN Pictures and Indonesian studio Pesari released in 1952. Her last film was And Ai, Thank You!, released in 2019 and starring Ai-Ai delas Alas.

=== Theater ===
Fernandez also did acting for theater. She did 13 Plays of Wilfrido Ma. Guerrero, and reprised her role as Lola Basyang in Ballet Manila's version of Severino Reyes' Tatlong Kuwento ni Lola Basyang in 2015.

== Death ==
Fernandez died of cardiac arrest at a hospital in Marikina, on March 5, 2022, at the age of 86.

== Filmography ==
=== Films ===
Year	Title	Role	Notes	Source
1952	Rodrigo de Villa			
1975	Bulaklak Man Ay Lupa			
1976	Ursula			
1976	Pilyang Engkantada			
1976	Minsa'y Isang Gamu-gamo			
1982	Mr. Wong Meets Jesse & James			
1986	Tu-Yay and His Magic Payong			
1989	Ang Bukas Ay Akin			
1991	Little Boy Blue		Also known as Tiny Terrestrial	
1991	Anak ni Janice			
1991	Yes, Yes, Yo: Kabayong Kutsero			
1991	Okay Ka, Fairy Ko!: The Movie	Luka		
1992	Takbo... Talon... Tili!!!		Segment "Ang Lalaki sa Salamin"	
1993	Kailan Dalawa ang Mahal			
1996	Patikim ng Pinya			
1997	Ang Mapanuksong Hiyas			
2004	Feng Shui	Aling Biring		
2009	Sundo	Louella's Aunt		
2009	T2	Sister Lourdes		
2009	Ang Darling Kong Aswang	Simang		
2016	Malinak Ya Labi			
2017	Mang Kepweng Returns	Komadrona		
2017	The Ghost Bride	Lalaine Yu		
2019	And Ai, Thank You!		Last appearance	

=== Television ===
Year	Title	Role	Notes	Source
1986–1990	Ora Engkantada	Lola Torya		
1987–1997	Okay Ka, Fairy Ko!	Luka & Lucring		
1988	Ula: Ang Batang Gubat	Victoria Montecillo		
1993	Ipaglaban Mo!		Episode: "Talunan ang Magwagi"	
1999	Esperanza	Mameng		
2001	Tabing Ilog	Tyang Luisa	Kelly's Auntie	
2007	Princess Charming	Sister Melinda		
2010	Pepito Manaloto	Lola Yolanda		
2011–2012	Amaya	Gawas		
2014	Innamorata	Belenita "Belen" Fuentebella		
2014	Forevermore	Aling Galietta		
2016	The Millionaire's Wife	Delia Cruz		
2017–2018	Kambal, Karibal	Magda		
2018	The One That Got Away	Zumba Lola		
2019	Maaalaala Mo Kaya: Passport	Grandmother	Last TV appearance	
