= Star Drama Presents =

Filipino TV program

- Title card from 1995 to 1997
- Also known as: Star Drama Theater Presents (1993–1999)
- Genre: Anthology
- Created by: ABS-CBN Studios
- Country of origin: Philippines
- Original language: Filipino

Production
- Running time: 30-60 minutes
- Production company: Star Cinema Television Unit

Original release
- Network: ABS-CBN
- Release: February 18, 1993 – February 17, 2001

Related
- Maalaala Mo Kaya; Discovery Drama Theater; Wansapanataym

Star Drama Presents (previously Star Drama Theater) is a Philippine television drama anthology series broadcast by ABS-CBN. It aired from February 18, 1993 to February 17, 2001. The weekly program featured an actor for a thirteen week season. By 2000, Star Drama Theater was renamed Star Drama Presents after the series was reformatted from monthly anthologies featuring one actor to months-long miniseries featuring an entire cast.

Various actors and actresses from Philippine Movies and TV get a special line up in this anthology with different stars in each month. The first featured star was Nora Aunor who was contracted to appear for one season. Her stint was billed as a "TV comeback" after a brief hiatus. She and ex-husband Christopher de Leon did a notable episode which highly rated during its initial telecast. After a 2-season stint of "Nora" the anthology moved on to featuring various stars ranging from award-winning actresses such as Elizabeth Oropesa, Dawn Zulueta, Lorna Tolentino, Agot Isidro; to younger actors Rico Yan, Claudine Barretto, Camille Prats, Judy Ann Santos, Jericho Rosales, Patrick Garcia, Dayanara Torres, Carmina Villarroel, Angelika Dela Cruz, Rica Peralejo, Aiko Melendez, Manilyn Reynes, Sheryl Cruz, Diether Ocampo, Dominic Ochoa, Donita Rose and Jolina Magdangal; and on the last years of the show it served as a venue for actors and actresses signed with Star Magic to showcase their thespic abilities.

This series was streaming on Jeepney TV beginning September 20, 2020 every last quarter of the month, 5:00 pm.

== See also ==
- List of programs broadcast by ABS-CBN
- Maalaala Mo Kaya
