= List of awards and nominations received by Piolo Pascual =

Piolo José Nonato Pascual (screen name: Piolo Pascual, born January 12, 1977, in Manila, Philippines) is a film and television actor, recording artist and songwriter, concert performer, host, product endorser, professional dancer, and film producer in the Philippines.

== Awards ==
=== Film and television awards ===
Movie/TV Show	Category	Organization/Year
Silong	Movie Actor of the Year (tied with Dennis Trillo)	32nd PMPC Star Awards for Movies (2016)
Starting Over Again	Movie Actor of the Year (tied with John Lloyd Cruz)	31st PMPC Star Awards for Movies (2015)
Hawak Kamay	Best Performance by an Actor (TV Series)	Gawad TANGLAW Awards
N/A	Hottest Actor of the Year	1st Yahoo! OMG! Awards
Lobo	Best Drama Actor	22nd PMPC Star Awards for TV (2008)
Maalaala Mo Kaya Piso	Best Single Performance by a Lead Actor	21st PMPC Star Awards for TV (2007)
Don't Give Up On Us	Best Actor (tied with Jericho Rosales)	23rd PMPC Star Awards for Movies (2007)
Don't Give Up On Us	Best Actor (Musical or Comedy)	4th ENPRESS Golden Screen Awards (2007)
Milan	Best Actor	54th FAMAS Awards (2005)
Mangarap Ka	Best Drama Actor	1st ENPRESS Golden Screen Entertainment TV Awards (2004)
Dekada '70	Best Supporting Actor	U.P. Film Desk of the YOUNG CRITICS CIRCLE (2003)
Dekada '70	Best Supporting Actor	GAWAD URIAN (2003)
Dekada '70	Best Supporting Actor	FAP (2003)
Dekada '70	Best Supporting Actor	FAMAS Awards (2003)
Dekada '70	Best Supporting Actor	PMPC Star (2003)
Dekada '70	Best Supporting Actor	PASADO (2003)
Dekada '70	Best Supporting Actor	GAWAD TANGLAW (2003)
Dekada '70	Best Supporting Actor	Metro Manila Film Festival-Philippines (2002)
Dekada '70	Special Recognition for RARE GRAND SLAM	Guillermo Mendoza Memorial Scholarship Foundation (2003)

=== Music awards ===
Category	Album/Song	Organization/Year
Revival Album of the Year	Decades	2nd PMPC Star Awards for Music 2010
Album Cover Design of the Year	Decades	2nd PMPC Star Awards for Music 2010
Best Album Package	Decades	23rd AWIT Awards 2010
Best Song Written for Movie/TV/Stage Play	Paano Kita Iibigin	21st AWIT Awards 2008
Male Recording Artist of the Year		38th Box Office Entertainment Awards 2008
Male Artist Awardee	Timeless	ASAP 3rd Platinum Circle Awards 2007
Compilation Awardee	Nagmamahal Kapamilya – Songs For Global Pinoys	ASAP 3rd Platinum Circle Awards 2007
Compilation Awardee	Hotsilog – The ASAP Hotdog Compilation Album	ASAP 3rd Platinum Circle Awards 2007
Male Artist Awardee	Timeless	ASAP 24k Awards 2007
Triple Platinum	Timeless	Philippine Association of the Record Industry Inc.(2007)
Sextuple Platinum	Nagmamahal Kapamilya – Songs For Global Pinoys	Philippine Association of the Record Industry Inc. (2007)
Gold	Paano Kita Iibigin OST	Philippine Association of the Record Industry Inc. (2007)
Original Theme Song of the Year	Sana’y Malaman Mo	23rd PMPC Star Awards for Movies 2007
Platinum	Hotsilog – The ASAP Hotdog Compilation Album	Philippine Association of the Record Industry Inc.(2006)
Gold	Piolo Pascual: Platinum Hits	Philippine Association of the Record Industry Inc.(2006)
Gold	Renditions: Songs of Louie Ocampo	Philippine Association of the Record Industry Inc.(2005)
Platinum	My Gift	Philippine Association of the Record Industry Inc.(2004)
Platinum	Piolo	Philippine Association of the Record Industry Inc.(2003)

- In the Philippines, a gold award means selling in excess of 12,500 units and a platinum award means selling in excess of 25,000 units.
- Pascual's album "Piolo Pascual: Platinum Hits" was repackaged. "Ikaw Lamang", the theme song of the teleserye "Sa Piling Mo" was added.
- Sana'y Malaman Mo (lyrics: Ogie Alcasid, music: Louie Ocampo) was featured in the 2006 film Don't Give Up on Us.
- Paano Kita Iibigin (lyrics and music: Ogie Alcasid) was the theme song of the movie with the same title released in 2007.

=== Box-office and entertainment industry awards ===
Category	Organization/Year
One of Anak TV Seal's Most-Admired Male TV Personalities	Southeast Asian Foundation for Children's Television (2009)
One of Anak TV Seal's Most-Admired Male TV Personalities	Southeast Asian Foundation for Children's Television (2008)
Favorite Actor of the Year (Paano Kita Iibigin)	YES! Magazine's Readers' Choice Awards 2007
One of Anak TV Seal's Most-Admired Male TV Personalities	Southeast Asian Foundation for Children's Television (2007)
Star in the Philippine Walk of Fame	German Moreno and Eastwood City (2007)
Pop Celebrity Cameo (We Belong by Toni Gonzaga)	ASAP Pop Viewers' Choice Awards 2006
One of Anak TV Seal's Most-Admired Male TV Personalities	Southeast Asian Foundation for Children's Television (2006)
One of Anak TV Seal's Most-Admired Male TV Personalities	Southeast Asian Foundation for Children's Television (2005)
Mr. Screen Idol	FAMAS Awards (2005)
Mr. RP Movies	Guillermo Mendoza Memorial Scholarship Foundation (for 2005 box-office performance)
Mr. RP Movies	Guillermo Mendoza Memorial Scholarship Foundation (for 2004 box-office performance)
Mr. RP Movies	Guillermo Mendoza Memorial Scholarship Foundation (for 2003 box-office performance)
Youth Achievement Award	German Moreno and FAMAS Awards (2002)
Mr. RP Movies	Guillermo Mendoza Memorial Scholarship Foundation (for 2001 box-office performance)
Most Promising Group (The Hunks with Jericho Rosales, Bernard Palanca, Carlos Agassi, and Diether Ocampo)	Guillermo Mendoza Memorial Scholarship Foundation Awards (2001)
Mr. RP Movies	Guillermo Mendoza Memorial Scholarship Foundation (for 2000 box-office performance)

== Nominations ==
=== Film nominations (in producing) ===
Movie	Category	Organization/Year
Kimmy Dora	Best Motion Picture (Musical or Comedy)	ENPRESS Golden Screen 2010

=== Film nominations (in acting) ===
Movie	Category	Organization/Year
On the Job	Best Actor	FAMAS 2014
Love Me Again: Land Down Under	Best Actor	FAMAS 2010
Manila	Best Actor	GAWAD PASADO 2010
Paano Kita Iibigin	Best Actor	FAP (LUNA) 2009
Paano Kita Iibigin	Best Actor	FAMAS 2008
Paano Kita Iibigin	Best Actor	PMPC Star 2008
Don't Give Up On Us	Best Actor	FAMAS 2007
Dreamboy	Best Actor	GAWAD TANGLAW 2006
Dreamboy	Best Actor (Musical or Comedy)	ENPRESS Golden Screen 2006
Milan	Best Actor	GAWAD URIAN 2005
Milan	Best Actor	FAP (LUNA) 2005
Milan	Best Actor	PASADO 2005
Milan	Best Actor	PMPC Star 2005
Milan	Best Actor (Drama)	ENPRESS Golden Screen 2005
I Think I'm In Love	Best Actor	Manila Film Festival 2002
Mila	Best Actor	FAP 2002
Lagarista	Best Actor	GAWAD URIAN 2001
Esperanza	Best Supporting Actor	FAMAS Awards 2000
Esperanza	Best Supporting Actor	Metro Manila Film Festival 1999

=== Television nominations ===
TV show	Category	Organization/Year
ASAP	Best Male TV Host	PMPC Star Awards for TV 2013
Apoy Sa Dagat	Best Drama Actor	27th PMPC Star Awards for TV
Dahil Sa Pag-Ibig	Best Drama Actor	26th PMPC Star Awards for TV
Noah	Best Drama Actor	25th PMPC Star Awards for TV
ASAP	Best Male Host	PMPC Star Awards for TV 2011
Lovers in Paris	Best Drama Actor	24th PMPC Star Awards for TV
Lobo	Favorite Actor	Nickelodeon Philippines Kids' Choice Awards 2008
Walang Kapalit	Best Drama Actor	PMPC Star Awards for TV 2007
Sa Piling Mo	Best Drama Actor	PMPC Star Awards for TV 2006
Mangarap Ka	Best Drama Actor	PMPC Star Awards for TV 2004
Maalaala Mo Kaya Lobo	Best Single Performance by a Lead Actor	PMPC Star Awards for TV 2002
Sa Sandaling Kailangan Mo Ako	Best Drama Actor	4th Asian TV Awards 1999

=== Recording and Concert nominations ===
Song/Album/Concert Title	Category	Organization/Year
Kahit na Malayo Na (from the TV series Noah)	Best Song Written for a Movie/TV/Stage Play	Awit Awards 2012
Deccades II	Favorite Male Artist	MYX Music Awards 2011
I Don't Want You to Go (from the movie Love Me Again: Land Down Under)	Best Theme Song	FAMAS 2010
	Pop Music Male Artist	ASAP Pop Viewers Choice Awards 2010
Decades	Male Recording Artist of the Year	2nd PMPC Star Awards for Music
Decades	Male Pop Artist of the Year	2nd PMPC Star Awards for Music
Babe	Music Video of the Year	2nd PMPC Star Awards for Music
Pop Icons	Best Collaboration for a Major Concert (with Sam Milby, Erik Santos, Mark Bautista, and Christian Bautista)	22nd ALIW Awards 2009
	Male Vocalist of 2008	1st WAKI OPM Music Awards 2009 (101.9 FM Station)
	Listeners' Choice for Favorite Male Artist	1st WAKI OPM Music Awards 2009
Ten Piolo	Best Major Concert (Male)	21st ALIW Awards 2008
Ten Piolo	Best Performance in a Concert (Male)	21st ALIW Awards 2008
Paano Kita Iibigin	Best Performance by a Duet (with Regine Velasquez)	21st AWIT Awards 2008
	Pop Music Male Artist	ASAP Pop Viewers Choice Awards 2008
Paano Kita Iibigin	Best Original Song	ENPRESS Golden Screen 2008
Paano Kita Iibigin	Movie Original Theme Song	PMPC Star 2008
	Favorite Male Artist	3rd MYX Music Awards 2008
Paano Kita Iibigin	Favorite Collaboration (with Regine Velasquez)	3rd MYX Music Awards 2008
	Favorite Myx Live Performance (with Regine Velasquez)	3rd MYX Music Awards 2008
	Best Major Concert (Male)	20th ALIW Awards 2007
	Pop Music Male Artist	ASAP Pop Viewers Choice Awards 2007
Paano Kita Iibigin	Pop Movie Theme Song	ASAP Pop Viewers Choice Awards 2007
The Gift	Favorite Male Artist	4th MTV PILIPINAS People's Choice Awards 2004
Kailangan Kita	Best Performance by a Male Recording Artist	16th AWIT Awards 2003
Kailangan Kita	Best Pop Recording	16th AWIT Awards 2003
Kailangan Kita	Song of the Year (composer: Ogie Alcasid)	16th AWIT Awards 2003

=== Box-office and entertainment industry nominations ===
Category	Organization/Year
Pop Love Team (with Toni Gonzaga from the movie Starting Over Again)	ASAP Pop Viewers' Choice Awards 2014
Pop Screen Kiss (with Toni Gonzaga from the movie Starting Over Again)	ASAP Pop Viewers' Choice Awards 2014
Favorite Guest Appearance in a Music Video (Jeepney Love Story by Yeng Constantino)	MYX Music Awards 2011
Favorite Guest Appearance in a Music Video (We Belong by Toni Gonzaga)	MYX Music Awards 2007
