= Piolo Pascual =

Filipino actor and recording artist (born 1977)

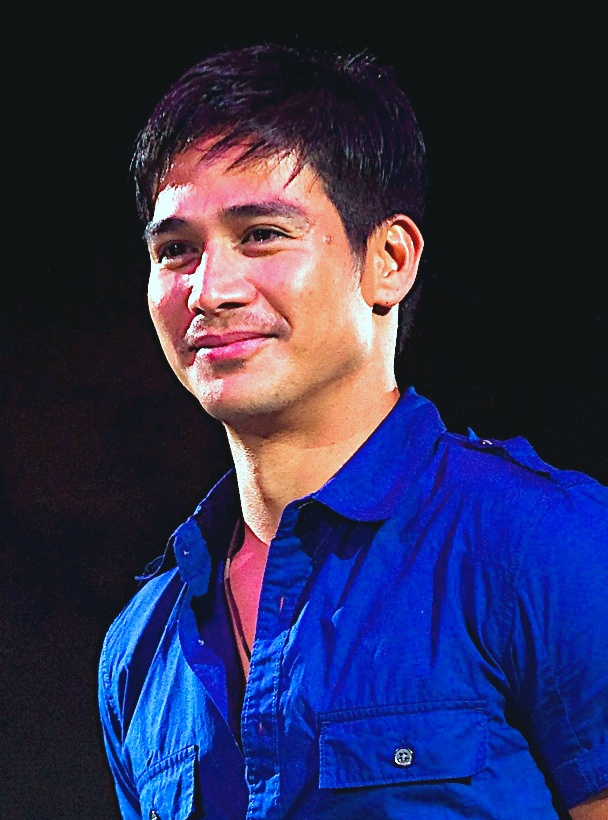
- Pascual in 2009
- Born: Piolo Jose Pascual Herzij; January 12, 1977 (age 49); Manila, Philippines
- Other names: PJ Pascual; Papa P
- Occupations: Actor; singer; film producer
- Years active: 1992–present
- Children: Iñigo Pascual
- Relatives: Benjamin Alves (nephew)
- Awards: Full list
- Website: piolojosepascual.com

Piolo Jose Nonato Pascual (Tagalog pronunciation: [pɐsˈkwal], born January 12, 1977) is a Filipino actor, model, singer, television host, comedian and film producer.

Pascual began a career in 1993 after landing a bit role in the film The Vizconde Massacre Story (God Help Us!) and made his first television appearance in youth-oriented talent and variety show, That's Entertainment (1994). He rose to fame after starring alongside Judy Ann Santos in the 1997 classic soap opera, Esperanza. They went on to star in several other television series and films, including Sa Puso Ko, Iingatan Ka (2001-2003), Sa Piling Mo (2006), Bakit 'Di Totoohanin (2001), Till There Was You (2003) and Don't Give Up on Us (2006). In 2002, Pascual starred in the period film Dekada '70, which earned him Best Supporting Actor wins at the 2003 PMPC Star Awards for Movies, FAMAS Awards, and Gawad Urian Awards.

In 2008, Pascual top billed the acclaimed supernatural drama series, Lobo. In 2013, he starred in the neo-noir crime thriller film, On the Job, which was screened at the Cannes Film Festival in France and the 17th Puchon International Fantastic Film Festival in South Korea. Pascual also produced the Kimmy Dora film series (2009–2013) and the film Kita Kita (2017). In 2018, he returned to television in the drama series Since I Found You. Pascual starred in the 2022 Philippine adaptation of Flower of Evil.

== Early life ==
Piolo Jose Nonato Pascual was born on January 12, 1977, in Malate, Manila, to Amelia "Amy" Nonato Pascual and Philip Victoriano Pascual as their youngest child among six children. His German-Spanish father was a casting director for international films that were shot in the Philippines, as well as an occasional actor. Pascual attended elementary and high school at St. Francis School in Santa Ana, Manila, where he joined the school's theater group.

While he was in third year high school in 1994, Pascual started appearing in the teen variety show That's Entertainment. He eventually left the show to get into college full-time, studying at the University of Santo Tomas (UST), where he initially took up a Bachelor of Arts course in general education, but later shifted to physical therapy to prepare for his immigration to the United States. Pascual was a member of UST's theater company, Teatro Tomasino. He did not graduate from college, choosing to pursue an entertainment career instead.

However, Pascual's acting career was interrupted at age 18 when he and his sister moved to the U.S. to join their mother, who had already been living and working there for six years. They lived in Los Angeles, where he worked multiple jobs, including as an ER representative in the hospital where his mother worked and as a security guard for the Academy Awards. When Pascual turned 21, he returned to Manila in order to pursue his acting career again.

== Career ==
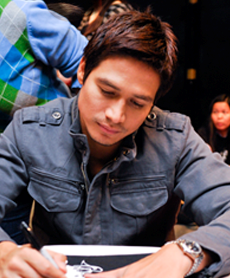
Piolo Pascual in April 2010

In 1994, Pascual started his career in That's Entertainment. Then he appeared in some TV shows including Mara Clara and Gimik. His loveteam with Judy Ann Santos became phenomenal in early 2000s. Their four movies, Kahit Isang Saglit, Bakit 'Di Totohanin, Till There Was You, and Don't Give Up on Us, earned more than P100 million in the box office. His movie with Claudine Barretto, Milan, became his top-grossing film up to date.

In his early singing career, he joined Diether Ocampo, Bernard Palanca, Jericho Rosales and Carlos Agassi to form The Hunks, an all-male group.

In 2002, Pascual played the role of Jules in the award-winning film, Dekada '70. He received eight awards in the Best Supporting Actor category and was given special recognition as a Best Supporting Actor for the same role by the GMMSF Box-Office Entertainment Awards.

In 2003, Pascual's debut album Piolo, went platinum. His second album My Gift hit Platinum status as well. His 5th solo album Timeless hit Triple Platinum status.

In 2007, he paired to Asia's Songbird Regine Velasquez in Paano Kita Iibigin, Piolo Pascual portrayed Lance Monteagudo.

In 2008, he starred in a fantasy TV series Lobo together with Angel Locsin. The show gained accolades from Banff World Media Festival and International Emmy Awards.

In 2009, Pascual became a producer for Manila, an independent twinbill film under Bicycle Pictures. After its world premiere at the Cannes Film Festival in May 2009, Manila had its official Philippine premiere in cinemas in July 2009 as the opening film of the 5th Cinemalaya Film Festival. He starred in the Philippine version of Lovers in Paris together with KC Concepcion the same year. Together with some directors and writers, Pascual created his film studio, Spring Films, which is known for its popular Kimmy Dora movie series.

In 2013, Pascual went to Cannes again with the movie On the Job.

== Business ==
=== Hotel and beach resort ===
Pascual and his business partner Kathryn Bernardo opened Isla Amara, a 42-bedroom boutique hotel in El Nido, Palawan, in 2022. He admitted and planned to open three or four more hotel resorts in Boracay and Siquijor.

=== Production company ===
In 2018, Pascual co-founded Spring Films with Joyce Bernal and Erikson Raymundo who serves as President of the company. Spring Film is an independent film company. The company ventures into co-producing Eugene Domingo's Kimmy Dora movie series.

=== Food business ===
Pascual ventured into food business and opened his own franchise of shawarma in 2018.

== Personal life ==
Pascual has a son, Iñigo Dominic Lázaro Pascual, born on September 14, 1997. Pascual is also the uncle of Filipino actor Benjamin Alves.

In 2013, Pascual joined the PETA campaign, Free Mali, whose aim was to move Mali, the lone elephant at the Manila Zoo, to a larger area. Mali died in 2023.

As of 2024, Pascual has been romantically involved with Shaina Magdayao.

Despite his "pretty boy" image, Pascual is oftentimes rumored and believed to be gay.

== Filmography ==
=== Film ===
==== As actor ====
Year	Title	Role
1993	The Vizconde Massacre Story (God Help Us!)	Jussi Leino
1997	Batang PX	Jessie
1999	Esperanza: The Movie	Brian
2000	Lagarista	Gregory
2000	Pera o Bayong!	Cameo/Himself
2000	Kahit Isang Saglit	Michael
2001	Mila	Primo
2001	Bakit 'Di Totohanin	Paul
2002	I Think I'm In Love	Jonas
2002	JOLOGS	Cameo as coffee shop customer
2002	9 Mornings	Gene Ynfante
2002	Dekada '70	Jules Bartolome
2003	Till There Was You	Albert Robles
2004	Milan	Lino
2005	Dreamboy	Philip / Eboy / Jaime
2005	D' Anothers	Cameo as himself
2006	Don't Give Up on Us	Vince
2006	Kagat ng Dilim	Guerilla leader
2007	Paano Kita Iibigin	Lance
2007	Chopsuey	Jimmy Wong
2009	Love Me Again	Migo
2009	Manila	William / Phillip
2010	Ang Tanging Ina Mo (Last na 'To!)	PSG Applicant
2012	Every Breath U Take	Leo Dimalanta
2012	24/7 in Love	Pipoy Ronquillo
2013	On the Job	Francis Coronel Jr.
2013	The Bit Player	Himself / Brando
2014	Starting Over Again	Marco Antonio Villanueva III
2014	Relaks, It's Just Pag-ibig	Danny / Elias
2015	The Breakup Playlist	Gino Avila
2015	Silong	Miguel Cascarro
2015	Etiquette for Mistresses	Edward Cervantes
2016	Hele sa Hiwagang Hapis	Simoun/Crisostomo Ibarra
2016	Love Me Tomorrow	JC
2017	Northern Lights: A Journey to Love	Charlie Sr.
2017	Can't Help Falling in Love	Emil
2017	Last Night	Mark Peters
2018	Ang Panahon ng Halimaw	Hugo Haniway
2020	Hayop Ka!	Papa George
2021	My Amanda	TJ
2023	Mallari	Juan Severino Mallari / Johnrey Mallari / Jonathan Mallari de Dios
2023	GomBurZa	Padre Pedro Palaez
2024	Moro	
2024	Sunshine	Pastor Jaime
2024	The Kingdom	Sulayman "Sulo" Tagum
2025	My Love Will Make You Disappear	Papa P (Cameo)
2025	The Sacrifice (upcoming film)	Marty
2025	Meet, Greet & Bye	Tupe Facundo
2025	Manila's Finest	Lt. Homer Magtibay

==== As executive producer ====
Year	Film
2009	Manila
2009	Kimmy Dora: Kambal sa Kiyeme
2012	Kimmy Dora and the Temple of Kiyeme
2013	Kimmy Dora: Ang Kiyemeng Prequel
2017	Kita Kita
2018	Meet Me in St. Gallen
2019	I’m Ellenya L.
2020	Hayop Ka!

=== Television ===
Year	Title	Role	Notes
1993–2001	Star Drama Presents		Special guest
1993	Ipaglaban Mo!: Matalim Kung Gumuguhit Ang Kapalaran		
1994	That's Entertainment	Himself	
1994	ATBP: Awit, Titik at Bilang na Pambata	Kuya Miguel	
1995–1997	Mara Clara		Recurring role
1996–1999	Gimik		Recurring role
1996; 1998–2020; 2021–present	ASAP	Himself	Co-host / Performer
1998	Sa Sandaling Kailangan Mo Ako	Raffy	Recurring role
1998	Star Drama Presents: Piolo	Various roles	Recurring role
1999	Esperanza	Brian	
1999	Judy Ann Drama Special	Dino	Pilot Episode: "Bodyguard"
1999–2000	Marinella	Paolo	
1999	Maalaala Mo Kaya		Episode: "Siato"
2000	Wansapanataym		Episode: "Ang Sireno"
2001	Maalaala Mo Kaya	Miguel	Episode: "Pier 39"
2001–2003	Sa Puso Ko, Iingatan Ka	Jordan Villamines	
2003–2004	Buttercup	Lance	
2004	Mangarap Ka	Celso / Oslec / Dragon King	
2006	Star Magic Presents	Alvin	Episode: "All About a Girl"
2006	Sa Piling Mo	Adrian Tuazon	
2006	Maalaala Mo Kaya	Mel	Episode: "Piso"
2007	Walang Kapalit	Noel Borromeo	
2007	Be Bench: The Model Search	Himself	Host
2008	Lobo	Noah Ortega	
2009	Komiks Presents: Nasaan Ka Maruja	Gabriel Montero	Episode: "The Real Gabriel"
2009	Lovers in Paris	Carlo Aranaz	
2010	Maalaala Mo Kaya	Ninoy Aquino	Episode: "Kalapati"
2010	Maalaala Mo Kaya	Ninoy Aquino	Episode: "Makinilya"
2010	May Bukas Pa	Choir member	Final Chapter: "Amen"
2010	Imortal	Noah Ortega	Telephone voice (Flashback appearance from Lobo)
2010–2011	Noah	Gabriel Perez	
2011	Maalaala Mo Kaya	Darwin Calvario	Episode: "Traysikel"
2011	MMK: Dalawang Dekada Documentary Special	Himself / Host	Special guest
2011	100 Days to Heaven	Dr. Ivan Carlos, Specialist	Special guest
2012	Maalaala Mo Kaya	Randy	Episode: "Sumpak"
2012	Dahil sa Pag-ibig	Father Alfred Valderama	
2013	Apoy sa Dagat	Ruben Manubat	
2014	Hawak Kamay	Eugene "Gin" Agustin	
2014	Home Sweetie Home	John Paul "JP" Valentino	Recurring role
2017	Maalaala Mo Kaya	Ryan	Episode: "Upuan"
2017	La Luna Sangre	Noah Ortega	Archive footage (Flashback appearance from Lobo)
2018	Since I Found You	Nathaniel "Nathan" Capistrano	
2020	Sunday Noontime Live!	Himself	Main host / Performer
2021	Niña Niño	Mayor Christopher Charles Juarez	Special guest
2022	My Papa Pi	Policarpio "Pipoy" Papa III	
2022	Flower of Evil	Jacob del Rosario / Daniel Villareal	
2023	Replacing Chef Chico	Raymond	
2024	Pamilya Sagrado	Rafael Sagrado	
2024–present	It's Showtime	Himself	Guest Performer
2024–present	Eat Bulaga!	Himself	Guest Performer
2025	Pinoy Big Brother: Celebrity Collab Edition 2.0	Himself	Houseguest
2026	My Bespren Emman	Himself	Creator

== Awards and nominations ==
=== Film and television awards ===
Movie/TV Show	Category	Organization/Year
Mallari	Best Actor	7th Eddys Awards (2024)
Silong	Movie Actor of the Year (tied with Dennis Trillo)	32nd PMPC Star Awards for Movies (2016)
Starting Over Again	Movie Actor of the Year (tied with John Lloyd Cruz)	31st PMPC Star Awards for Movies (2015)
Hawak Kamay	Best Performance by an Actor (TV Series) (tied with Coco Martin & Martin Escudero)	Gawad TANGLAW Awards
—N/a	Hottest Actor of the Year	1st Yahoo! OMG! Awards
Lobo	Best Drama Actor	22nd PMPC Star Awards for TV (2008)
Maalaala Mo Kaya: Piso	Best Single Performance by a Lead Actor	21st PMPC Star Awards for TV (2007)
Don't Give Up On Us	Best Actor (tied with Jericho Rosales)	23rd PMPC Star Awards for Movies (2007)
Don't Give Up On Us	Best Actor (Musical or Comedy)	4th ENPRESS Golden Screen Awards (2007)
Milan	Best Actor	54th FAMAS Awards (2005)
Mangarap Ka	Best Drama Actor	1st ENPRESS Golden Screen Awards (2004)
Dekada '70	Best Supporting Actor	U.P. Film Desk of the YOUNG CRITICS CIRCLE (2003)
Dekada '70	Best Supporting Actor	Gawad Urian Award (2003)
Dekada '70	Best Supporting Actor	FAP Awards (2003)
Dekada '70	Best Supporting Actor	FAMAS Awards (2003)
Dekada '70	Best Supporting Actor	PMPC Star Awards for Movies (2003)
Dekada '70	Best Supporting Actor	Gawad PASADO (2003)
Dekada '70	Best Supporting Actor	GAWAD TANGLAW (2003)
Dekada '70	Best Supporting Actor	28th Metro Manila Film Festival (2002)
Dekada '70	Special Recognition for RARE GRAND SLAM	GMMSF Box-Office Entertainment Awards (2003)

=== Music awards ===
Category	Album/Song	Organization/Year
Revival Album of the Year	Decades	2nd PMPC Star Awards for Music 2010
Album Cover Design of the Year	Decades	2nd PMPC Star Awards for Music 2010
Best Album Package	Decades	23rd AWIT Awards 2010
Best Song Written for Movie/TV/Stage Play	Paano Kita Iibigin	21st AWIT Awards 2008
Male Recording Artist of the Year		38th Box Office Entertainment Awards 2008
Male Artist Awardee	Timeless	ASAP 3rd Platinum Circle Awards 2007
Compilation Awardee	Nagmamahal Kapamilya – Songs For Global Pinoys	ASAP 3rd Platinum Circle Awards 2007
Compilation Awardee	Hotsilog – The ASAP Hotdog Compilation Album	ASAP 3rd Platinum Circle Awards 2007
Male Artist Awardee	Timeless	ASAP 24k Awards 2007
Triple Platinum	Timeless	Philippine Association of the Record Industry Inc. (2007)
6× Platinum	Nagmamahal Kapamilya – Songs For Global Pinoys	Philippine Association of the Record Industry Inc. (2007)
Gold	Paano Kita Iibigin OST	Philippine Association of the Record Industry Inc. (2007)
Original Theme Song of the Year	Sana’y Malaman Mo	23rd PMPC Star Awards for Movies 2007
Platinum	Hotsilog – The ASAP Hotdog Compilation Album	Philippine Association of the Record Industry Inc. (2006)
Gold	Piolo Pascual: Platinum Hits	Philippine Association of the Record Industry Inc. (2006)
Gold	Renditions: Songs of Louie Ocampo	Philippine Association of the Record Industry Inc. (2005)
Platinum	My Gift	Philippine Association of the Record Industry Inc. (2004)
Platinum	Piolo	Philippine Association of the Record Industry Inc. (2003)

- In the Philippines, a gold award means selling in excess of 12,500 albums and a platinum award means selling in excess of 25,000 albums.
- Pascual's album "Piolo Pascual: Platinum Hits" was repackaged. "Ikaw Lamang", the theme song of the teleserye "Sa Piling Mo" was added.
- Sana'y Malaman Mo (lyrics: Ogie Alcasid, music: Louie Ocampo) was featured in the 2006 film Don't Give Up on Us.
- Paano Kita Iibigin (lyrics and music: Ogie Alcasid) was the theme song of the movie with the same title released in 2007.

=== Box-office and entertainment industry awards ===
Category	Organization/Award-Giving Body/Year
Film Actor of the Year Mallari	Guillermo Mendoza Box-Office Entertainment Awards (2024)
Comedy Actor for Television Home Sweetie Home	Guillermo Mendoza Box-Office Entertainment Award (2019)
Box Office King Starting Over Again	Guillermo Mendoza Box-Office Entertainment Award (2015)
Most Influential Film Actor of the Year	4th EdukCircle Awards (2014)
Most Influential Celebrity Endorser of the Year	5th EdukCircle Awards (2015)
Best Male Variety Show Host	6th EdukCircle Awards (2016)
Fernando Poe Jr. Memorial Award	62nd FAMAS Awards (2014)
Dekada Awards (2003–2014)	30th PMPC Star Awards for Movies
One of Anak TV Seal's Most-Admired Male TV Personalities 6	Southeast Asian Foundation for Children’s Television (2009)
One of Anak TV Seal's Most-Admired Male TV Personalities	Southeast Asian Foundation for Children’s Television (2008)
Favorite Actor of the Year (Paano Kita Iibigin)	YES! Magazine's Readers' Choice Awards 2007
One of Anak TV Seal's Most-Admired Male TV Personalities	Southeast Asian Foundation for Children’s Television (2007)
Star in the Philippine Walk of Fame	German Moreno and Eastwood City (2007)
One of Anak TV Seal's Most-Admired Male TV Personalities	Southeast Asian Foundation for Children’s Television (2006)
One of Anak TV Seal's Most-Admired Male TV Personalities	Southeast Asian Foundation for Children’s Television (2005)
Mr. Screen Idol	53rd FAMAS Awards (2005)
Mr. RP Movies	Guillermo Mendoza Memorial Scholarship Foundation (2004)
Mr. RP Movies	Guillermo Mendoza Memorial Scholarship Foundation (2003)
German Moreno Youth Achievement Award	50th FAMAS Awards (2002)
Mr. RP Movies	Guillermo Mendoza Memorial Scholarship Foundation (2001)
Most Promising Group (The Hunks with Jericho Rosales, Bernard Palanca, Carlos Agassi, and Diether Ocampo)	Guillermo Mendoza Memorial Scholarship Foundation Awards (2001)
Mr. RP Movies	Guillermo Mendoza Memorial Scholarship Foundation (2000)

=== Film nominations (in producing) ===
Movie	Category	Organization/Year
Kimmy Dora	Best Motion Picture (Musical or Comedy)	ENPRESS Golden Screen 2010

=== Film nominations (in acting) ===
Movie	Category	Organization/Year
Starting Over Again	PinakaPASADOng Actor	17th Gawad PASADO Awards
—N/a	Darling of the Press	30th PMPC Star Awards for Movies
Manila	Best Actor	GAWAD PASADO Awards 2010
Paano Kita Iibigin	Best Actor	FAMAS 2008
Paano Kita Iibigin	Best Actor	FAP (LUNA) 2008
Paano Kita Iibigin	Best Actor	PMPC Star 2008
Don't Give Up on Us	Best Actor	FAMAS 2007
Dreamboy	Best Actor	GAWAD TANGLAW 2006
Dreamboy	Best Actor (Musical or Comedy)	ENPRESS Golden Screen 2006
Milan	Best Actor	GAWAD URIAN 2005
Milan	Best Actor	FAP (LUNA) 2005
Milan	Best Actor	PASADO 2005
Milan	Best Actor	PMPC Star 2005
Milan	Best Actor (Drama)	ENPRESS Golden Screen 2005
I Think I'm in Love	Best Actor	Manila Film Festival 2002
Mila	Best Actor	FAP 2002
Lagarista	Best Actor	GAWAD URIAN 2001
Esperanza	Best Supporting Actor	FAMAS Awards 2000
Esperanza	Best Supporting Actor	Metro Manila Film Festival 1999
Manila's Finest	Best Actor	51st Metro Manila Film Festival 2025

=== Television nominations ===
TV show	Category	Organization/Award-Giving Body/Year
ASAP	Outstanding Male Host in a Musical or Variety Program	ENPRESS 5th Golden Screen TV Awards
Apoy sa Dagat	Best Drama Actor	27th PMPC Star Awards for TV
Dahil sa Pag-ibig	Best Drama Actor	26th PMPC Star Awards for TV
Noah	Best Drama Actor	25th PMPC Star Awards for TV
ASAP Rocks	Best Male TV Host	25th PMPC Star Awards for TV
Lovers in Paris	Best Drama Actor	24th PMPC Star Awards for TV
ASAP 07	Best Male TV Host	21st PMPC Star Awards for TV
Walang Kapalit	Best Drama Actor	21st PMPC Star Awards for TV
Sa Piling Mo	Best Drama Actor	PMPC Star 2006
Mangarap Ka	Best Drama Actor	PMPC Star 2004
Maalaala Mo Kaya Lobo	Best Single Performance by a Lead Actor	PMPC Star Awards for TV 2002
Sa Sandaling Kailangan Mo Ako	Best Drama Actor	4th Asian TV Awards 1999

=== Recording and concert nominations ===
Song/Album/Concert Title	Category	Organization/Year
	Pop Music Male Artist	ASAP Pop Viewers Choice Awards 2010
Decades	Male Recording Artist of the Year	2nd PMPC Star Awards for Music
Decades	Male Pop Artist of the Year	2nd PMPC Star Awards for Music
Babe	Music Video of the Year	2nd PMPC Star Awards for Music
Pop Icons	Best Collaboration for a Major Concert (with Sam Milby, Erik Santos, Mark Bautista, and Christian Bautista)	22nd ALIW Awards 2009
	Male Vocalist of 2008	1st WAKI OPM Music Awards 2009 (101.9 FM Station)
	Listeners' Choice for Favorite Male Artist	1st WAKI OPM Music Awards 2009
Ten Piolo	Best Major Concert (Male)	21st ALIW Awards 2008
Ten Piolo	Best Performance in a Concert (Male)	21st ALIW Awards 2008
Paano Kita Iibigin	Best Performance by a Duet (with Regine Velasquez)	21st AWIT Awards 2008
	Pop Music Male Artist	ASAP Pop Viewers Choice Awards 2008
Paano Kita Iibigin	Best Original Song	ENPRESS Golden Screen 2008
Paano Kita Iibigin	Movie Original Theme Song	PMPC Star 2008
	Favorite Male Artist	3rd MYX Music Awards 2008
Paano Kita Iibigin	Favorite Collaboration (with Regine Velasquez)	3rd MYX Music Awards 2008
	Favorite Myx Live Performance (with Regine Velasquez)	3rd MYX Music Awards 2008
	Best Major Concert (Male)	20th ALIW Awards 2007
	Pop Music Male Artist	ASAP Pop Viewers Choice Awards 2007
Paano Kita Iibigin	Pop Movie Theme Song	ASAP Pop Viewers Choice Awards 2007
The Gift	Favorite Male Artist	4th MTV PILIPINAS People's Choice Awards 2004
Kailangan Kita	Best Performance by a Male Recording Artist	16th AWIT Awards 2003
Kailangan Kita	Best Pop Recording	16th AWIT Awards 2003
Kailangan Kita	Song of the Year (composer: Ogie Alcasid)	16th AWIT Awards 2003

== Discography ==
=== Singles ===
List of singles as lead artist, showing year released, selected chart positions, and associated albums
Year	Title	Peak chart positions		Album
Year	Title	PHL	TPS	Album
2002	The Prophet	—	—	Only Selfless Love
2003	Kailangan Kita	—	—	Piolo
2003	Ikaw Ang Buhay Ko	—	—	Piolo
2003	Nag-iisa	—	—	Piolo
2003	Ako'y Sa'yo Lamang	—	—	Piolo
2003	Ikaw Parin Pala	—	—	Piolo
2003	Kaibigan Mo Ako	—	—	Piolo
2003	Till There Was You	—	—	Piolo
2003	Tell Me Why	—	—	Piolo
2003	Kung Ako Ba S'ya?	—	—	Piolo
2003	Muntik Nang Maabot Ang Langit	—	—	Piolo
2003	Sana Ikaw	—	—	Piolo
2003	Kahit Isang Saglit	—	—	Piolo
2004	The Gift	—	—	My Gift
2004	Bakit Hindi Na Lang Ikaw	—	—	My Gift
2004	Sa May Bintana	—	—	My Gift
2004	I Need You Back	—	—	My Gift
2004	Through The Years	—	—	My Gift
2004	The Gift (with Claudine Barreto)	—	—	My Gift
2004	Paano Kaya Magtatagpo (with Vina Morales)	—	—	Vina (Mamahalin Ka Nya)
2005	Shadows of Time	—	—	Renditions... Piolo Sings Louie O.
2005	Group Hug	—	—	Renditions... Piolo Sings Louie O.
2005	Sana'y Malaman Mo	—	—	Renditions... Piolo Sings Louie O.
2005	Pansinin Mo Ako	—	—	Renditions... Piolo Sings Louie O.
2005	So Many Questions	—	—	Renditions... Piolo Sings Louie O.
2005	Closer You and I	—	—	Renditions... Piolo Sings Louie O.
2005	Without You	—	—	Renditions... Piolo Sings Louie O.
2005	No Regrets	—	—	Renditions... Piolo Sings Louie O.
2005	Forever	—	—	Renditions... Piolo Sings Louie O.
2005	Nasaan Ka Man	—	—	Renditions... Piolo Sings Louie O.
2005	Don't Give Up On Us	—	—	Piolo Pascual (Platinum Hits)
2005	Together Forever	—	—	Piolo Pascual (Platinum Hits)
2005	Mangarap Ka	—	—	Piolo Pascual (Platinum Hits)
2006	Miss Universe	—	—	Hotsilog
2007	Paano Kita Iibigin	—	—	Paano Kita Iibigin original soundtrack
2007	Paano Kita Iibigin (with Regine Velasquez)	—	—	Paano Kita Iibigin original soundtrack
2007	Angel Eyes	—	—	Paano Kita Iibigin original soundtrack
2007	Lalala	—	—	Paano Kita Iibigin original soundtrack
2007	Thesa's Theme	—	—	Paano Kita Iibigin original soundtrack
2007	Muling Nagmamahal (with Regine Velasquez)	—	—	Paano Kita Iibigin original soundtrack
2007	My World with You (with Regine Velasquez)	—	—	Paano Kita Iibigin original soundtrack
2007	Sana Nga (with Regine Velasquez)	—	—	Paano Kita Iibigin original soundtrack
2007	One More Chance	—	—	Timeless
2007	Ikaw Na Nga	—	—	Timeless
2007	If Only Love (with Toni Gonzaga)	—	—	Timeless
2007	Why Can't We Be Together	—	—	Timeless
2007	Nagmamahal Ng Tunay (sub-theme song of Walang Kapalit)	—	—	Timeless
2007	There for Me	—	—	Timeless
2007	Wagas	—	—	Timeless
2007	Turuan Mo Ako	—	—	Timeless
2007	To Hear You Say You Love Me (feat. Jim Brickman)	—	—	Timeless
2007	Ikaw Pa Rin	—	—	Timeless
2007	Dahil Ikaw	—	—	Timeless
2007	Why Can't We Be Together (Acoustic Version)	—	—	Timeless
2007	Ikaw Na Nga (Alternate Version)	—	—	Timeless
2007	Ikaw Lamang (theme song of Sa Piling Mo	—	—	Timeless
2007	Walang Kapalit (theme song of Walang Kapalit)	—	—	Timeless
2007	Complete (Centrum theme song)	—	—	Timeless
2007	I Don't Want You to Go (iTunes bonus track)	—	—	Timeless
2009	I'll Be Seeing You	—	—	Decades (The Greatest Songs of the 50's, 60's & 70's)
2009	Beyond the Sea	—	—	Decades (The Greatest Songs of the 50's, 60's & 70's)
2009	True Love	—	—	Decades (The Greatest Songs of the 50's, 60's & 70's)
2009	Are You Lonesome Tonight	—	—	Decades (The Greatest Songs of the 50's, 60's & 70's)
2009	Can't Take My Eyes	—	—	Decades (The Greatest Songs of the 50's, 60's & 70's)
2009	You've Lost That Lovin' Feelin'	—	—	Decades (The Greatest Songs of the 50's, 60's & 70's)
2009	If I Fell	—	—	Decades (The Greatest Songs of the 50's, 60's & 70's)
2009	Strangers in the Night	—	—	Decades (The Greatest Songs of the 50's, 60's & 70's)
2009	Just the Way You Are	—	—	Decades (The Greatest Songs of the 50's, 60's & 70's)
2009	Your Song	—	—	Decades (The Greatest Songs of the 50's, 60's & 70's)
2009	Terminal	—	—	Decades (The Greatest Songs of the 50's, 60's & 70's)
2009	Babe	—	—	Decades (The Greatest Songs of the 50's, 60's & 70's)
2009	Wag Na Wag Mong Sasabihin (with KC Concepcion)	—	—	Lovers in Paris soundtrack
2010	Never Thought - That I Could Love	—	—	Decades II (Greatest Songs of the 1980's, 1990's & 2000's)
2010	It's Sad to Belong - To Someone Else	—	—	Decades II (Greatest Songs of the 1980's, 1990's & 2000's)
2010	Just Tell Me You Love Me	—	—	Decades II (Greatest Songs of the 1980's, 1990's & 2000's)
2010	Somebody	—	—	Decades II (Greatest Songs of the 1980's, 1990's & 2000's)
2010	Truly Madly Deeply	—	—	Decades II (Greatest Songs of the 1980's, 1990's & 2000's)
2010	The Actor	—	—	Decades II (Greatest Songs of the 1980's, 1990's & 2000's)
2010	You Were There	—	—	Decades II (Greatest Songs of the 1980's, 1990's & 2000's)
2010	To Be with You	—	—	Decades II (Greatest Songs of the 1980's, 1990's & 2000's)
2010	You'll Be in My Heart	—	—	Decades II (Greatest Songs of the 1980's, 1990's & 2000's)
2010	Again	—	—	Decades II (Greatest Songs of the 1980's, 1990's & 2000's)
2010	Hero	—	—	Decades II (Greatest Songs of the 1980's, 1990's & 2000's)
2010	To Where You Are	—	—	Decades II (Greatest Songs of the 1980's, 1990's & 2000's)
2010	When I Fall in love (with Carol Banawa)	—	—	My Music My Life
2010	No Matter What	—	—	Kris Aquino (The Greatest Love)
2010	Pasko Na Sinta Ko	—	—	Ngayong Pasko Magniningning Ang Pilipino
2012	Ikaw Lang	—	—	Decades III (Best of OPM)
2012	Ayoko Na Sana	—	—	Decades III (Best of OPM)
2012	Sa Kanya	—	—	Decades III (Best of OPM)
2012	Natutulog Ba Ang Diyos	—	—	Decades III (Best of OPM)
2012	Paminsan Minsan	—	—	Decades III (Best of OPM)
2012	Hindi Magbabago	—	—	Decades III (Best of OPM)
2012	Be My Lady	—	—	Decades III (Best of OPM)
2012	Leaving Yesterday Behind	—	—	Decades III (Best of OPM)
2012	Kung Kailangan Mo Ako	—	—	Decades III (Best of OPM)
2012	Kapalaran	—	—	Decades III (Best of OPM)
2012	Kastilyong Buhangin	—	—	Decades III (Best of OPM)
2012	Kung Mawawala Ka	—	—	The Songwriter And The Hitmakers
2012	Every Breath You Take	—	—	Every Breath U Take soundtrack
2014	Hawak Kamay	—	—	Hawak Kamay theme song
2015	Paano Ba Ang Magmahal (with Sarah Geronimo)	—	—	The Breakup Playlist soundtrack
2015	With a Smile	—	—	The Breakup Playlist soundtrack
2015	Ikaw Lamang (with Sarah Geronimo)	—	—	The Breakup Playlist soundtrack
2015	Patawarin	—	—	The Breakup Playlist soundtrack
2015	Paano Ba Ang Magmahal (with Sarah Geronimo acoustic version)	—	—	The Breakup Playlist soundtrack
2016	She's Always a Woman	—	—	Life Songs (MMK 25)

=== Studio albums ===
Album	Year	Records
Piolo	2003	Star Records
My Gift	2004	Star Records
Timeless	2007	Star Records
Decades	2009	Star Records
Decades II	2010	Star Records
Decades III	2012	Star Records

=== Compilation albums ===
Album	Year	Records
Renditions: Songs of Louie Ocampo	2005	Star Records
Platinum Hits	2006	Star Records

=== Other appearances ===
Year	Song	Album
2006	"Miss Universe"	Hotsilog: The ASAP Hotdog Compilation
2007	"Nariyan Ka pa Rin Sana"	Nagmamahal, Kapamilya: Songs For Global Pinoys
2007	"Paano Kita Iibigin" (Solo)	Paano Kita Iibigin Soundtrack
2007	"Paano Kita Iibigin" (with Regine Velasquez)	Paano Kita Iibigin Soundtrack
2007	"Angel Eyes"	Paano Kita Iibigin Soundtrack
2007	"Lalala"	Paano Kita Iibigin Soundtrack
2007	"Thesa's Theme"	Paano Kita Iibigin Soundtrack
2007	"Muling Nagmamahal" (with Regine Velasquez)	Paano Kita Iibigin Soundtrack
2007	"My World with You" (with Regine Velasquez)	Paano Kita Iibigin Soundtrack
2007	"Sana Nga" (with Regine Velasquez)	Paano Kita Iibigin Soundtrack
2009	"Wag Na Wag Mong Sasabihin" (with KC Concepcion)	Lovers in Paris Soundtrack
2013	"Kung Kailangan Mo Ako" (with the ABS-CBN Philharmonic Orchestra)	Little Champ theme song
2014	"Hawak Kamay"	Hawak Kamay theme song
2016	"Magpahanggang Wakas" (with the ABS-CBN Philharmonic Orchestra)	Magpahanggang Wakas theme song
