= Timeless (Piolo Pascual album) =

Studio album by Piolo Pascual
- Released: August 12, 2007
- Length: 68:51
- Languages: English, Filipino
- Label: Star
- Producers: Jonathan Manalo, Piolo Pascual, Malou N. Santos (exec.), Annabelle Regalado-Borja (exec.)

Piolo Pascual chronology
Renditions (2005)	Timeless (2007)

Timeless is the third studio album and fifth solo album by Filipino actor and singer Piolo Pascual. It was released on August 12, 2007.

== Track listing ==
No.	Title	Writer(s)	Producer(s)	Length
1.	"One More Chance"	Jude Gitamondoc	Jonathan Manalo, Piolo Pascual	4:35
2.	"Ikaw Na Nga"	Jonothan Manalo	Jonathan Manalo, Piolo Pascual	4:38
3.	"If Only Love" (duet with Toni Gonzaga)	Willy Wilcox	Jonathan Manalo, Piolo Pascual	4:52
4.	"Why Can't We Be Together"	Piolo Pascual	Jonathan Manalo, Piolo Pascual	3:38
5.	"Nagmamahal ng Tunay" (sub-theme of Walang Kapalit)	Ricky Sanchez	Ricky Sanchez	3:56
6.	"There for Me"	Piolo Pascual	Jonathan Manalo, Piolo Pascual	3:23
7.	"Wagas"	Edwin Marollano	Edwin Marollano	4:17
8.	"Turuan Mo Ako"	Richard Poon	Jonathan Manalo, Piolo Pascual	4:08
9.	"To Hear You Say You Love Me" (featuring Jim Brickman)	Jim Brickman	Jonathan Manalo, Piolo Pascual	4:06
10.	"Ikaw Pa Rin"	Arnie Mendoras	Arnie Mendoras	4:11
11.	"Dahil Ikaw" (one of the themes of Sa Piling Mo)	Marlon Silva	Jonathan Manalo, Piolo Pascual	4:58
12.	"Why Can't We Be Together" (acoustic version)	Piolo Pascual	Jonathan Manalo, Piolo Pascual	3:39
13.	"Ikaw Na Nga" (alternate version)	Jonathan Manalo	Jonathan Manalo, Piolo Pascual	4:39
14.	"Ikaw Lamang" (main theme of Sa Piling Mo)	Dodgie Simon	Jonathan Manalo	4:08
15.	"Walang Kapalit" (main theme of Walang Kapalit)	Rey Valera	Jonathan Manalo	4:22
Total length:				68:51

Bonus tracks
No.	Title	Length
16.	"Complete" (Centrum theme song)	2:18
17.	"I Don't Want You to Go" (iTunes bonus track)	4:29

== Awards ==
- Gold Record Award
