= Sa Sandaling Kailangan Mo Ako =

- Title card for 1
- Genre: Drama; Miniseries
- Created by: ABS-CBN Studios
- Developed by: ABS-CBN Studios; Star Cinema
- Directed by: Olivia M. Lamasan (1); Ruel S. Bayani & Nick Lizaso (2)
- Starring: Marvin Agustin; Piolo Pascual; Kristine Hermosa
- Ending theme: "Kung Kailangan Mo Ako" by Ara Mina (1) / Randy Santiago (2)
- Composer: Rey Valera
- Country of origin: Philippines
- Original language: Filipino
- No. of seasons: 2
- No. of episodes: 33

Production
- Production locations: Bulacan; Batangas
- Editor: Ben Panaligan
- Running time: 42-71 minutes
- Production company: Star Creatives

Original release
- Network: ABS-CBN
- Release: November 16, 1998 – September 6, 1999

Sa Sandaling Kailangan Mo Ako (lit. 'the moment you need me') is a Philippine television drama series broadcast by ABS-CBN. Directed by Olivia M. Lamasan, Ruel S. Bayani and Nick Lizaso, it stars Kristine Hermosa, Marvin Agustin, Piolo Pascual, G. Toengi, John Lloyd Cruz, Kaye Abad, Dante Rivero, Hilda Koronel, Ronaldo Valdez, Tessie Tomas and Tracy Vergel. It aired from November 16, 1998 to September 6, 1999 replacing Palibhasa Lalake and was replaced by Judy Ann Drama Special.

The series was currently available on Jeepney TV YouTube channel and IWant (But edited).

== Plot ==
=== Book 1 ===
Ruben Morales (Marvin Agustin) and Raffy Enriquez (Piolo Pascual) are childhood friends, but with different backgrounds. Ruben came from a humble family working in the sugar plantation owned by the Enriquez family, while Raffy is the eldest son of Ramon Enriquez (Ronaldo Valdez), a prominent businessman in San Miguel. However, their fathers were close friends before. Ramon had an affair with Dolor (Hilda Koronel), before her wedding to Julio (Dante Rivero). Because of this, Julio would become a cruel adoptive father to Ruben, due to his anger towards Ramon.

The friendship was put to the test when Stella (G. Toengi) began an affair with Ruben, thus ending their friendship, especially when Ruben found out that Ramon is his biological father. Ramon's ambitious wife Sonia (Tessie Tomas) would do anything to get rid of Ruben and Dolor, as they might get an inheritance from Ramon's wealth. But, Ruben met a simple young girl Agnes (Kristine Hermosa), and developed a close bond with her.

One night, as Stella and Ruben decided to leave, Raffy saw them and ran away, but got hit by a tree as they were chased by Raffy. The two had a fight, afterwards, Raffy saw Stella's lifeless body. She was stabbed by an unknown perpetrator. Ruben was accused for Stella's murder despite his innocence. As a result, Dolor died while Ruben was assaulted in jail. During the trial, Raffy's youngest sister Marge (Tracy Vergel), testified and told the court, that it was Chito (William Lorenzo), a drug-crazed son of a politician who murdered Stella. Marge and Chito's plan is to threaten Stella, but she fought back and stabbed by Chito. The case against Ruben was dismissed and he filed charges against those responsible for his assault, including Sonia who was the mastermind. Marge decided to leave to enter a convent while Sonia followed suit. But while traveling, her car fell in a ravine and in the river and was presumed dead.

In the end, Ruben reconciled with his biological father Ramon. Ramon also reconciled with Julio, where the latter admits that his cruelty to Ruben is because of anger towards him. He also said that it's time for both of them to make up for Ruben. Raffy and Ruben reconciled also and recognized each other as brothers.

=== Book 2 ===
Title card for Book 2

On the wedding day of Ruben and Agnes, an explosion happened, injuring those in attendance. Agnes was injured and caused her eyesight. However, Ramon, Ruben's biological father went into a coma and was brought to Manila for treatment. Ruben took the responsibility of Ramon's business. After being presumed dead after an accident, Sonia returned to San Miguel, while Marge who went to a convent, turned out to be the mastermind in the bombing in Ruben's wedding. Upon Sonia's return, she took advantage of Ramon's condition to get her revenge against Ruben. She became a very trusted person to Ruben.

== Cast ==
- Marvin Agustin as Ruben Morales
- Kristine Hermosa as Agnes
- Piolo Pascual as Raffy Enriquez
- G. Toengi as Stella Enriquez (Book 1)
- John Lloyd Cruz as Jojo
- Kaye Abad as Eloisa Morales
- Dante Rivero as Julio Morales
- Hilda Koronel as Dolor Morales
- Ronaldo Valdez as Ramon Enriquez
- Tessie Tomas as Sonia Enriquez
- Tracy Vergel as Margarita "Marge" Enriquez
- William Lorenzo as Chito del Mundo (Book 1)
- Minnie Aguilar as Mildred
- Allen Dizon
- January Isaac credited as Sandra Gomez as Irene (Book 2)
- Bong Regala as Doctor
- Menggie Cobarrubias
- Jackie Castillejo
- Nante Montereal
- Simon Ibarra as Simon
- Gammy Viray as Attorney
- Snooky Serna as Lucia
- CJ Ramos as Angelito
- Richard Quan

== Trivia about this mini-series ==
- Sa Sandaling Kailangan Mo Ako was the first ever mini-series to be broadcast of ABS-CBN along with the production of Star Cinema.
- When the Book 1 of this mini-series ends on February 1, 1999, it was replaced temporarily by the also mini-series Nagmamahal Pa Rin Sa 'Yo, a second mini-series. The Book 2 of Sa Sandaling Kailangan mo Ako just started on April 19, 1999 replacing the mini-series who also replaced them for a while.

== Reruns ==
The series re-aired on Kapamilya Channel (now S+A) from 2007 to 2008 and Jeepney TV from January 26 to April 6, 2014, replacing Familia Zaragoza and from September 17 to November 26, 2023, replacing the rerun of Ysabella and was replaced by the rerun of Gimik.

It re-aired again on June 2, 2025 in Jeepney TV's Youtube Channel replacing the original Mara Clara in their 1:00 PM timeslot until July 4, 2025 that was replaced by Sa Dulo ng Walang Hanggan in the same timeslot at the next day.

== Gallery ==
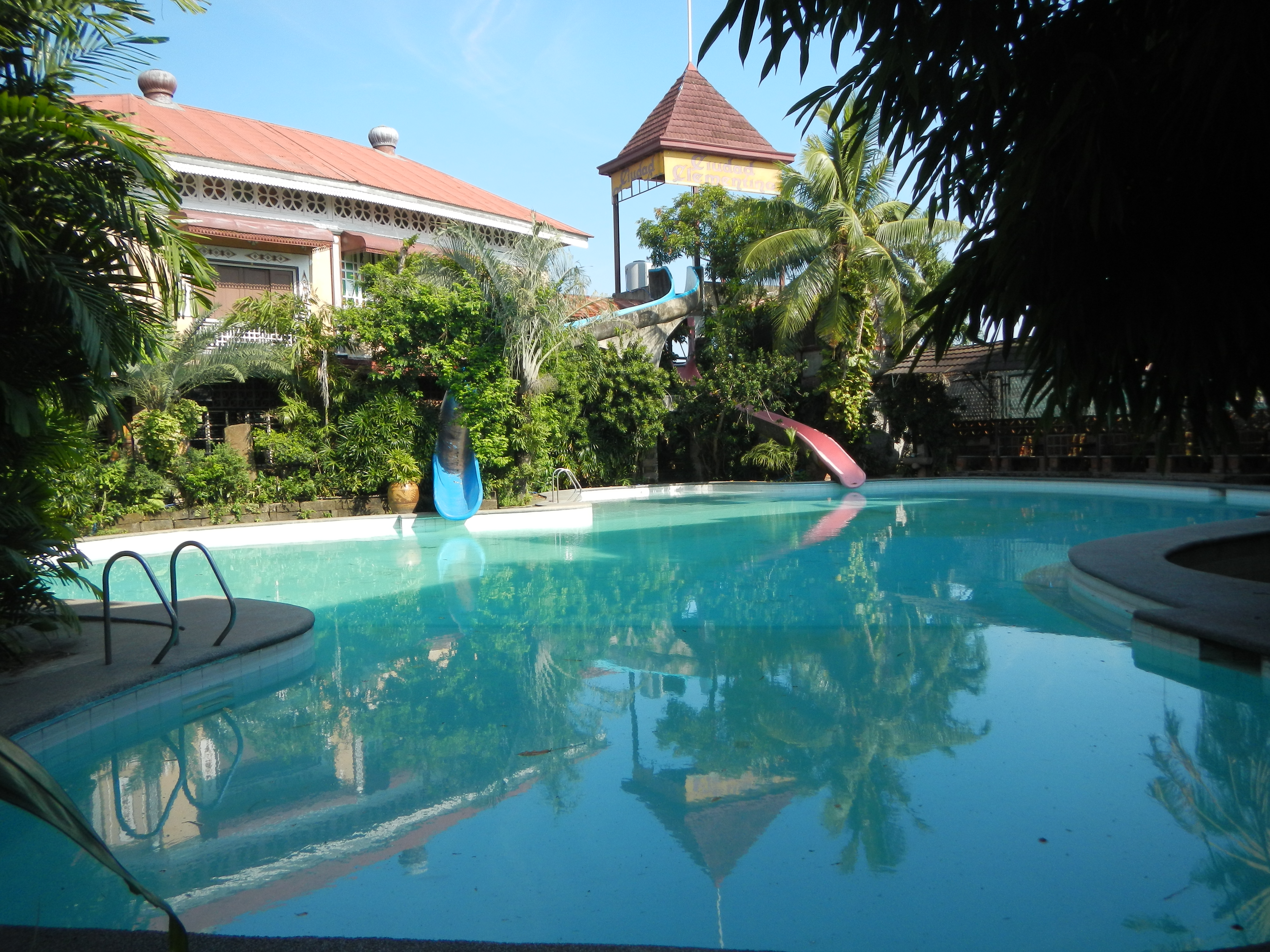
Ciudad Clementino (main pool), Paombong

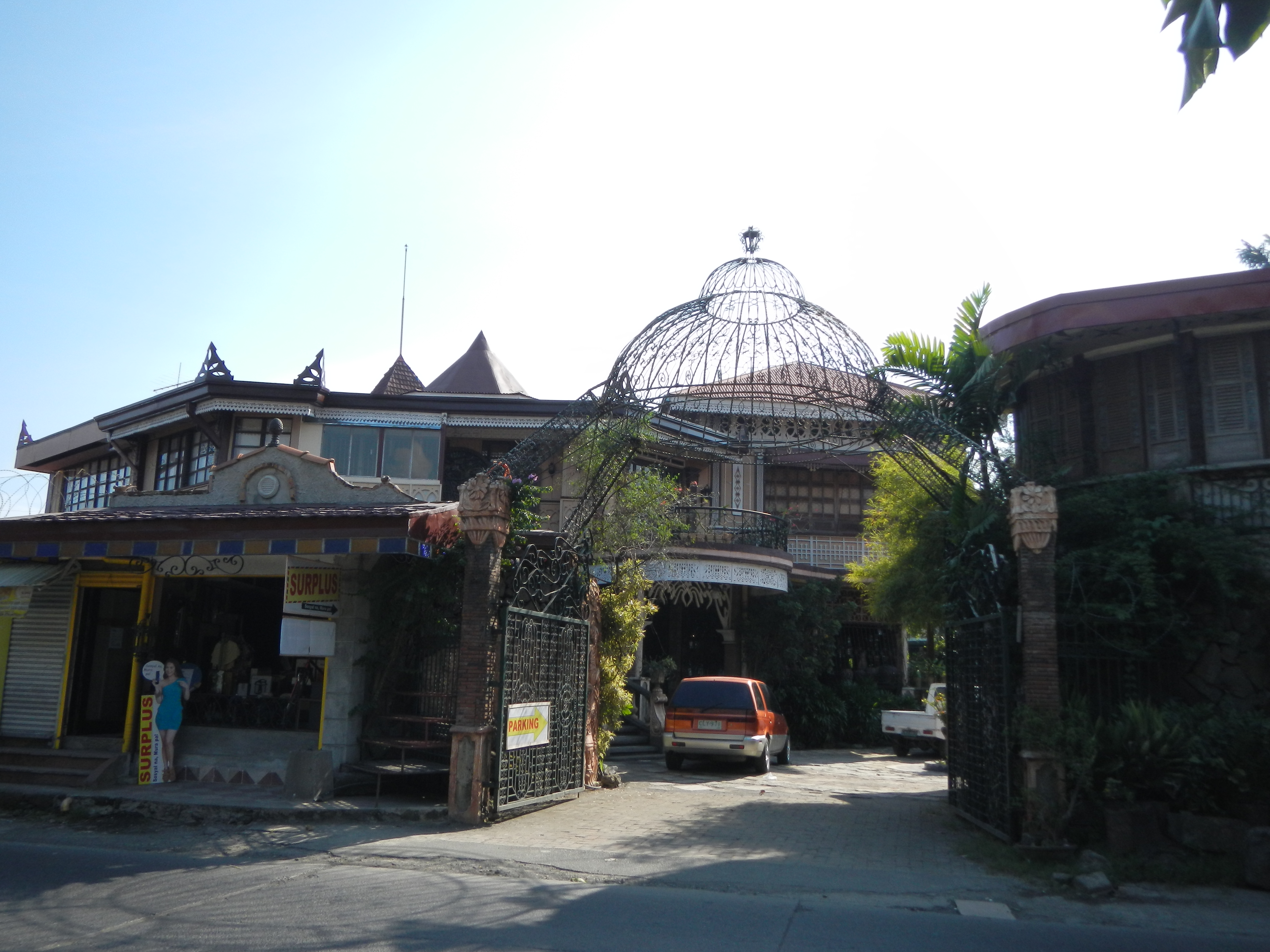
Facade (the venue of this drama series )

== See also ==
- List of programs broadcast by ABS-CBN
