= G. Toengi =

Filipino actress

G. Toengi-Walters
- Born: Giselle Anne Töngi; June 14, 1978 (age 48); Neuilly-sur-Seine, France
- Occupations: Actress; singer; model; VJ
- Years active: 1993–present
- Spouse: Tim Walters (m. 2005)
- Children: 2

Giselle Anne Töngi-Walters (born June 14, 1978) is a Filipino actress.

== Early life and education ==
Töngi was born on June 14, 1978, in Neuilly-sur-Seine, France to a Swiss father, Erich, and Filipina mother, Aurora. She has four siblings namely: Avie, Tony, John and Sharon. She was raised by her mother in New York and moved to Manila at age 15.

Töngi studied at the Lee Strasberg School of Acting in New York City. She obtained a bachelor's degree in communication studies from the University of California, Los Angeles and a master's degree in nonprofit management from Antioch University.

== Career ==
Töngi was 5 when she was discovered by an agent at a mall. She was then launched as a member of the pioneer batch of Star Circle (now Star Magic). In the early 2000s, she left a thriving acting career in the Philippines to try her luck in Hollywood. She landed a role in Saved by the Bell: The Musical and in 2004 in the stage play Days When Cocaine Was King. She played a planted fan to the contestants during a challenge in America's Next Top Model, Cycle 16, which can be seen in Episode 9 of the said Cycle.

In 2014, Töngi replaced Jannelle So as host and producer of Kababayan Today, which airs on KSCI (LA-18).

== Personal life ==
Töngi married bartender Tim Walters in a beach wedding in Boracay on February 19, 2005. Together they have two children, Kenobi Benjamin and Alecks.

== Filmography ==
=== Film ===
Year	Title	Role	Notes	Source
1995	Rollerboys	Michelle		
1996	Taguan			
1996	S'yempre Ikaw Pa Rin			
1996	Kabilin-bilinan ng Lola			
1996	Istokwa			
1997	Diliryo	Jessy Delmundo		
1997	Wala Ka nang Puwang sa Mundo	Shirley		
1997	Da Best in Da West 2: Da Western Pulis Istori	Rowena Quesada		
1997	Langit sa Piling Mo	Felipa		
1998	Sonny Segovia: Lumakad Ka sa Apoy			
1998	Tumutol Man AngTadhana			
1999	Ganito Ako Magmahal			
1999	Luksong Tinik	Irene		
1999	Gimik: The Reunion	Gina De Leon		
1999	Hinahanap-hanap Kita	Jenny		
2000	Tunay na Mahal	Moira		
2004	Enteng Kabisote: Okay ka, Fairy Ko: The Legend	Ina Magenta		
2006	Super Noypi	Jenny's Teacher		
2006	Enteng Kabisote 3: Okay Ka, Fairy Ko: The Legend Goes On and On and On	Ina Magenta	Credited as "Giselle 'G' Toengi"	
2007	Enteng Kabisote 4: Okay Ka, Fairy Ko: The Beginning of the Legend	Ina Magenta		
2009	Nobody, Nobody But... Juan	Jane		
2010	White House	Elisa		
2013	Must Be... Love	Mother of Patchot		
2013	Bayang Magiliw			
2014	Trophy Wife	Ella		
2018	First Love	Vicky		

=== Television ===
Year	Title	Role	Notes	Source
1993–1998	Palibhasa Lalake	KC		
1994	That's Entertainment	Herself — Host / Performer		
1994	Dugo sa Pakpak ng Anghel			
1994	Miss Universe Pageant	Herself – Host		
1996	Gimik	Gina de Leon		
1996	Maalaala Mo Kaya		Episode: "Billiards"; Credited as "Giselle 'G' Toengi"	
1996	Maalaala Mo Kaya	Jessica	Episode: "Pusang Itim"	
1996	Music Bureau	Herself – Host		
1998	Sa Sandaling Kailangan Mo Ako	Stella		
1998	'Sang Linggo nAPO Sila			
1998	MTV Asia	VJ		
1998–1999	!Oka Tokat	Melissa "Lizzie" Santiago		
1999–2002	Beh Bote Nga	Genie G.		
1999–2000	EZ Dancing Non-Stop	Herself — Host		
2004	Mulawin	Ynang Reyna		
2004	Maalaala Mo Kaya		Episode: "Kurtina"	
2009	Maalaala Mo Kaya	Gina	Episode: "Apron"	
2009	Everybody Hapi		Guest, 1 episode	
2010	Your Song Presents: Gimik 2010	Angelina "Gina" de Leon-Ballesteros		
2011	America's Next Top Model	Fan		
2012	Nandito Ako	Cara Aguilar-Bradley		
2012	It's Showtime	Herself — Judge	Guest	
2012–2013	Aryana	Stella Cervantes		
2013	The Balikbayan Project	Herself – Producer / Narrator / Editor		
2014	Paraiso Ko'y Ikaw	Regina		
2014	Carmela	Odette Trinidad		
2014–2016	Kababayan Today	Herself — Host		
2014–2015	Pun Plip Pridays on Kababayan Today	Sketch Comedian	Executive Producer; Director: "The Audition"; Writer: "Valentines Special"; Editor: "Goldilocks Special"	

=== Theater ===
Year	Title	Role	Notes	Source
2004	The Days When Cocaine Was King	Juanita	American Renegade Theater	
2010	The Vagina Monologues: Filipinas 2010		Aratani/Japan America Theatre	
2013	Piaf	Marlene Dietrich	Atlantis Productions; Carlos P. Romulo Auditorium; Credited as "Giselle Töngi-Walters"	
2013	The Producers	Ulla	Repertory Philippines	

== Discography ==
=== Studio albums ===
Year	Album
2000	Very G: Label: Sony Music Philippines

=== Compilation appearances ===
Year	Album	Song(s)	Label(s)
2000	Songs from Dawson's Creek — Volume 2 (Asian Edition)	"I Will Win Your Love This Season"	Sony BMG
