= Gimik 2010 =

- Logo
- Also known as: Your Song Presents: Gimik 2010
- Genre: Teen drama
- Created by: Liezel Anne Olubalang
- Directed by: Erick C. Salud; Francis Javier Pasion
- Starring: See the Main Cast
- Opening theme: "Tabi" by Paraluman feat. Kean Cipriano of Callalily
- Country of origin: Philippines
- Original language: Filipino
- No. of seasons: 2
- No. of episodes: 12

Production
- Executive producer: Jennifer B. Soliman
- Production locations: Manila, Philippines
- Running time: 60 minutes

Original release
- Network: ABS-CBN
- Release: April 25 – July 11, 2010

Related
- Gimik; Gimik: The Reunion

Gimik 2010 is a Philippine television series on ABS-CBN as part of Your Song weekly series. It is a reintroduction of the 1990s series Gimik.

== Cast and characters ==
=== Main cast ===
==== Season 1: The Reunion ====
- Judy Ann Santos as Dianne Villaruel
- Diether Ocampo as Gregorio "Gary" Ballesteros
- Giselle Toengi as Angelina "Gina" de Leon-Ballesteros
- Mylene Dizon as Melanie Suntay-Lorenzo
- Bojo Molina as Brian Lorenzo

==== Season 2: The Beginnings ====
- Jessy Mendiola as Jessy Lorenzo, daughter of Brian's cousin. Originally from Cebu she moved to Manila for a fresh start. She once fell in love with Franco and rebelled against her parents. She had a letter "F" tattooed above her behind to show her love for Franco. The two of them once thought of eloping but Jessy walked in on Franco with another girl in his hotel room.
- Lance Christopher as Lance Marquez
- Franco Daza as Franco Zubiri
- Jaco Benin as Jaco
- Kenji Shirakawa as Kenji
- Kazuo Nawa as Kazuo
- Hanna Flores as Hanna
- Janeena Chan as Janeena
- Albie Casiño as Albie Marquez
- Vangie Martelle as Vangie
- Daniel Padilla as Daniel Ledesma
- Julia Montes as Mara (credited as Mara Montes)
- Arie Reyes as Arie
- Marlann Flores as Marlann

=== Supporting cast ===
- Will Devaughn as Raymond Salvador
- Dimples Romana as Bingbing
- Andre Tiangco as Robert Lorenzo - Jessy's dad
- Fred Payawan as Gab
- Mico Palanca as Eugene
- Xyriel Manabat as Gracy Ledesma

== See also ==
- Gimik
