= Judy Ann Drama Special =

1999-2001 drama series every Monday starring Judy Ann Santos

- Title card
- Genre: Drama; Anthology
- Directed by: various
- Starring: Judy Ann Santos
- Opening theme: "I'll Be There" by Carol Banawa
- Country of origin: Philippines
- Original language: Filipino
- No. of episodes: 102

Production
- Running time: 90 minutes

Original release
- Network: ABS-CBN
- Release: September 13, 1999 – September 3, 2001

Judy Ann Drama Special is a Philippine television drama series broadcast by ABS-CBN. It stars Judy Ann Santos, it aired from September 13, 1999 to September 3, 2001 replacing Sa Sandaling Kailangan Mo Ako and was replaced by Your Honor.

This series is currently streaming on Jeepney TV YouTube Channel.

== Cast ==
- Judy Ann Santos

== Episodes ==
- Bodyguard

guests: Piolo Pascual, Lee Robin Salazar, Robert Arevalo, Glenda Garcia

- Sa Paglaki ni Mommy

guests: Ma. Isabel Lopez, Zoren Legaspi, Alan Paule, Richard Quan

- Sige, Pakasal Ka Na!

guests: Joko Diaz, Miguel dela Rosa

- Kabit-kabit Na Puso

guests: Laurice Guillen, Joel Torre, Sherilyn Reyes, Hazel Ann Mendoza

- Ms. Rosegirl

guests: Romnick Sarmenta, Robin da Roza

- Signos

guests: Elizabeth Oropesa, Kier Legaspi, Victor Neri

- Sugat sa Ugat

guests: Zsa Zsa Padilla, Leandro Muñoz, Emilio Garcia, Anita Linda

- Bihagin ang Babaeng Ito

guests: Jomari Yllana, Jeffrey Santos

- So What, Coconut? (guest: Teresa Loyzaga)
- Santa Claus
- A Million and a Baby (guest: Mark Anthony Fernandez)
- Talak, Halakhak, Palakpak (guest: Ai-Ai delas Alas)
- Leap Year Na, Pikot Na (guest: Nida Blanca)
- May–December, June–September (guest: Gloria Diaz, Bella Flores, Mark Gil)
- Si Nanay at Ako (guest: Fanny Serrano, Miguel Dela Rosa)
- Wallflower (guest: Ciara Sotto)
- Chambermaid (guest: Jhong Hilario)
- Sammy (guest: Ronnie Ricketts)
- Alon (guest: Nida Blanca)
- Bahay-bahayan (guest: Christopher de Leon)
- Mental-mentalan (guest: Kier Legaspi)
- Sa Haplos ng Dilim

guests: Ian Veneracion, John Prats, Dante Rivero, Gina Pareño, Julia Clarete

- Sa Isang Mundo... Sa Dako Roon

guests: Vhong Navarro, Jodi Sta. Maria, Carlos Agassi, Tommy Abuel, Jean Saburit

- Ikaw Lang Sa Aking Pasko (guest: Wowie de Guzman)
- Mangarap Ka Para sa Akin (guest: Vina Morales)
- Idol Ko si Shawie
- Taxi Driver, Sweet Lover (guest: Gardo Versoza)
- Marriage Disposal (guest: Dominic Ochoa)
- Save You, Save Me (guest: Kimpee de Leon)
- Love To the Finish Line (guest: Onyok Velasco)
- Witchy Witching Hocus Pocus (guest: Ana Capri)
- Kapag Nagunaw Ang Mundo (guest: Gio Alvarez)
- Sa Pagmulat ng Puso (guest: Eric Quizon)
- Pusong Pilak (guest: Danilo Barrios)
- Work to the Max (guest: Joel Torre, Tanya Garcia)
- Up and Down (guest: Eugene Domingo)
- One of the Boys (guest: Luis Alandy)
- The Brigadier General's Daughter (guest: Eddie Garcia, Epi Quizon)
- Mail Order Bride (guest: Smokey Manaloto)
- Bagito (guest: Serena Dalrymple)
- Nightshift (guest: Jinggoy Estrada)
- Ms. Dilang Baluktot, Mr. Pusong Haliparot (guest: Eric Fructuoso)
- Guarding Miguelito (guest: Robin Padilla)
- Bespren (guest: Manilyn Reynes)
- Guest Of Dishonor
- Ugly Duckling
- Jack en Joy-lius (guest: Piolo Pascual)
- Virgin Wife (guest: Dominic Ochoa)
- Lumba-lumba (guest: Johnny Delgado)
- Wanted: Pregnancy (guest: Vhong Navarro)
- Si Teray, Si Terry Lobangco (guest: Bobot Mortiz)
- Madaldal ang Puso (guest: Ian Veneracion)
- Lumapit, Lumayo ang Puso (guest: Wowie de Guzman)
- Boss ni Bess
- Siya'y Umalis, Siya'y Dumating (guest: Gardo Versoza)
- Kidnapped For Love (guest: Kimpee de Leon)
- Ilusyonada (guest: Hilda Koronel)
- There Goes The Bride (guest: Mark Anthony Fernandez)
- Good Morning, Miss Sungit (guest: Camille Pratts)
- Quiere, Quiere Bago Hele
- Ghost Singer (guest: Jessa Zaragoza)
- Nunal sa Bibig
- Romansang ala Pocketbook (guest: Rustom Padilla)
- Sa Gitna ng Pag-ibig at Paalam (guest: Ariel Rivera, Jay Manalo)
- Wanted: Perfect Yaya (guest: Jestoni Alarcon)
- Dear Children (guest: Jericho Rosales)

== See also ==
- List of programs broadcast by ABS-CBN
