= Manila Zoo =

Zoological garden in the city of Manila, Philippines

- The entrance in 2022
- Interactive map of Manila Zoo
- 14.5647412°N 120.9886014°E
- Date opened: July 25, 1959; 67 years ago
- Location: Adriatico Street, Malate, Manila, Philippines
- Land area: 5.5 hectares (14 acres)
- No. of animals: 549 (2023)
- No. of species: 90 (2015)
- Annual visitors: 480,000+
- Major exhibits: Mali (elephant) (now deceased)
- Owner: City Government of Manila
- Management: Manila Public Recreation Bureau
- Public transit: Quirino
- Website: manilazoo.ph

The Manila Zoo, formally known as the Manila Zoological and Botanical Garden, is a 5.5-hectare (14-acre) zoo located in Malate, Manila, Philippines. First opened on July 25, 1959, it was recently renovated and reopened on November 21, 2022.

== History ==
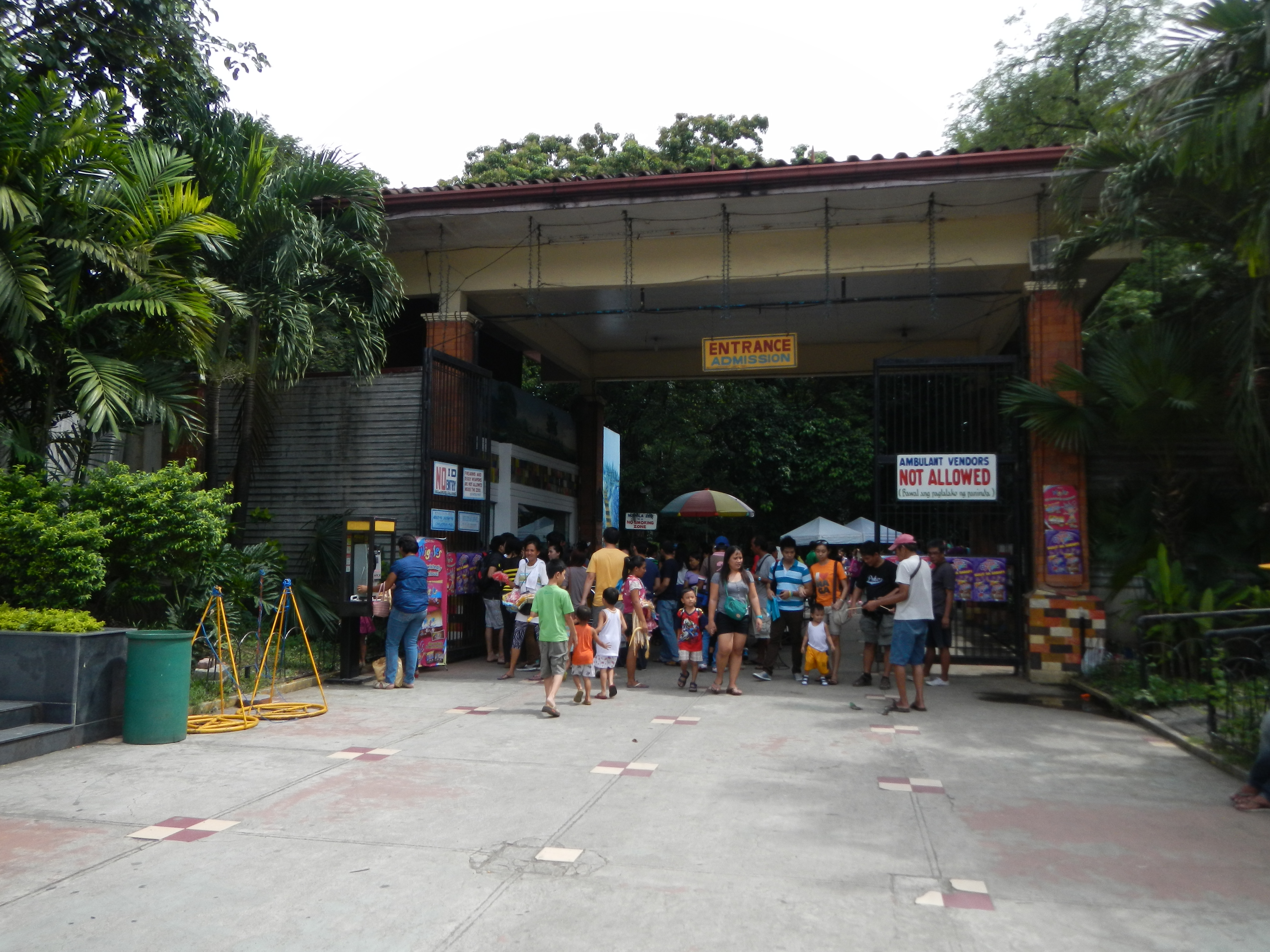
Zoo entrance in 2013

The Manila Zoological and Botanical Garden first opened to the public on July 25, 1959, during the tenure of Manila Mayor Arsenio Lacson. The zoo, also known colloquially as Manila Zoo, underwent construction for one year and cost more than ₱1 million to create. Its inauguration was attended by First Lady Leonila Garcia. It is erroneously referred to as the oldest zoo in Asia by the Manila city government, partly for which it is marked as a city landmark, despite the establishment of Tokyo’s Ueno Zoo in Japan in 1882.

In the mid-2000s, People for the Ethical Treatment of Animals (PETA) launched a campaign against Manila Zoo calling for its closure as part of its global campaign against zoos. The animal rights organization supported plans to convert the zoo into a sports complex. The Manila city government led by Mayor Alfredo Lim, as well as local vendors operating in the zoo, opposed PETA's campaign against Manila Zoo.

Manila Zoo was indefinitely closed on January 23, 2019 by Manila Mayor Joseph Estrada after the Department of Environment and Natural Resources (DENR) identified it as a major pollutant of Manila Bay. The zoo was found to be dumping untreated sewage into an estuary that empties into the bay. Estrada's government planned to renovate the zoo, but the project was placed on hold. Animals which remained in captivity continued to be taken care of by zoo employees and volunteers despite the closure.

Plans to renovate the zoo once again surfaced following the election of Isko Moreno as Manila mayor, and in July 2020, a groundbreaking ceremony was held for the rehabilitation and redevelopment of the zoo. The project's budget was a reported ₱1.7 billion and was initially expected to be finished in 19 months. The zoo was planned to introduce a 30-foot (9.1 m) lagoon waterfall, a big cat enclosure, a marsupial exhibit, a monkey enclosure, and a restaurant. The zoo reopened on December 30, 2021.

On January 19, 2022, the Zoo became a temporary COVID-19 vaccination site for minors and senior citizens.

On November 21, 2022, the Zoo fully reopened to the public.

== Animals ==
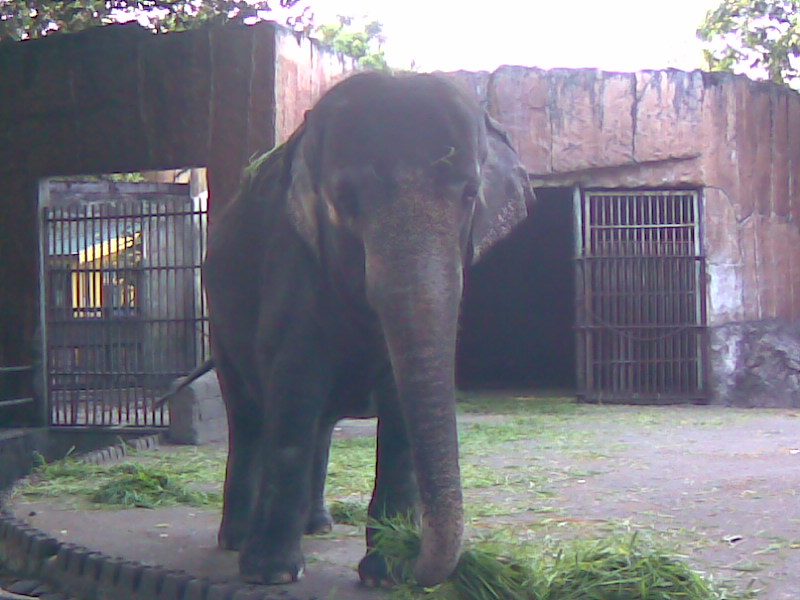
Mali, an Asian elephant and the main attraction of the zoo, now deceased.

The Manila Zoo is home to more than 549 specimens of exotic wildlife, representing at least 12 species of mammals, 38 species of birds, and 21 species of reptiles.

Principal animals include a White Siberian Tiger named Kois, an anagram of former Manila Mayor Isko Moreno's nickname. The zoo formerly housed a hippopotamus named Queen Bertha, which died in 2017 as the oldest captive hippopotamus in the world at age 65. It also formerly housed a lone Asian female elephant named Ma'ali (Vishwama'ali), which died in November 2023. Due to her living in isolation for several decades, she had been the subject of various campaigns to have her relocated to a sanctuary overseas, but remained a major attraction at the zoo. Her taxidermized remains are currently on display at the zoo's entrance since December 2024.

The zoo's animal collection is divided into four categories: mammals, birds, reptiles, and aquatic life.

Many of the animals of the zoo were born in captivity, with three month-old juveniles recently born in April 2015.

Redeveloped botanical garden

== Plants ==
The Manila Zoo's Botanical Garden nurtures more than 10,000 plants in its botanical garden.

== Facilities ==
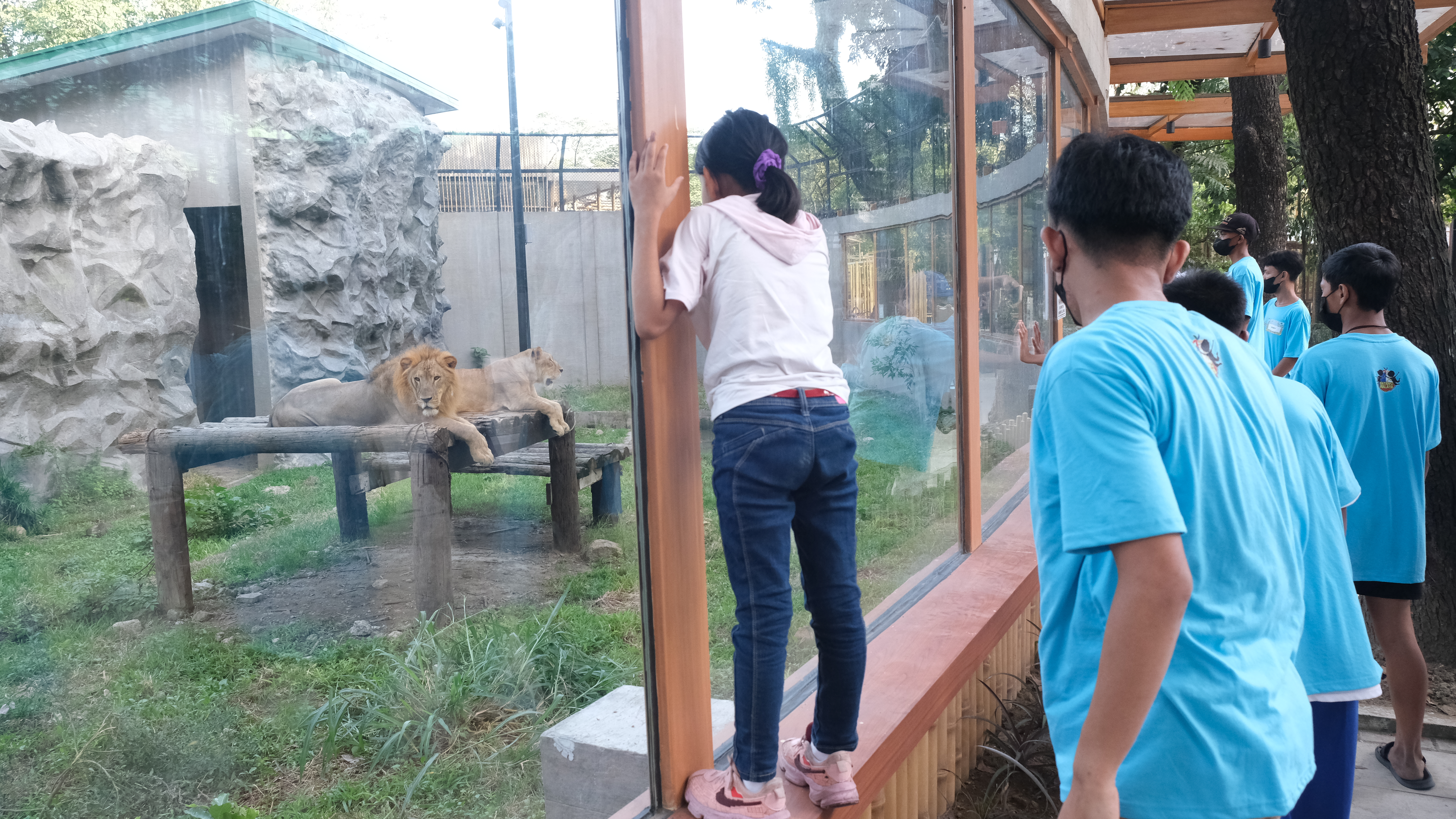
Children viewing lions in captivity.

Manila Zoo covers an area of 51,000 square meters (550,000 sq ft), and is under the direct management of the Manila City Government through its Public Recreation Bureau.

- Animal Museum
- Zoo Lagoon
- Sewage Treatment Plant
- Botanical Garden
- Butterfly Garden
- Children's Park
- Reptile House
- Outdoor Reptiles

=== Former facilities ===
==== Wildlife Rescue Center ====
The Wildlife Rescue Center served as a temporary shelter and repository for confiscated, donated, retrieved, sick, injured and abandoned wildlife species. The Wildlife Rescue Center has been the subject of public scrutiny in regard to their animal welfare standards. The area was permanently closed on January 23, 2019.

==== Kinder Zoo ====
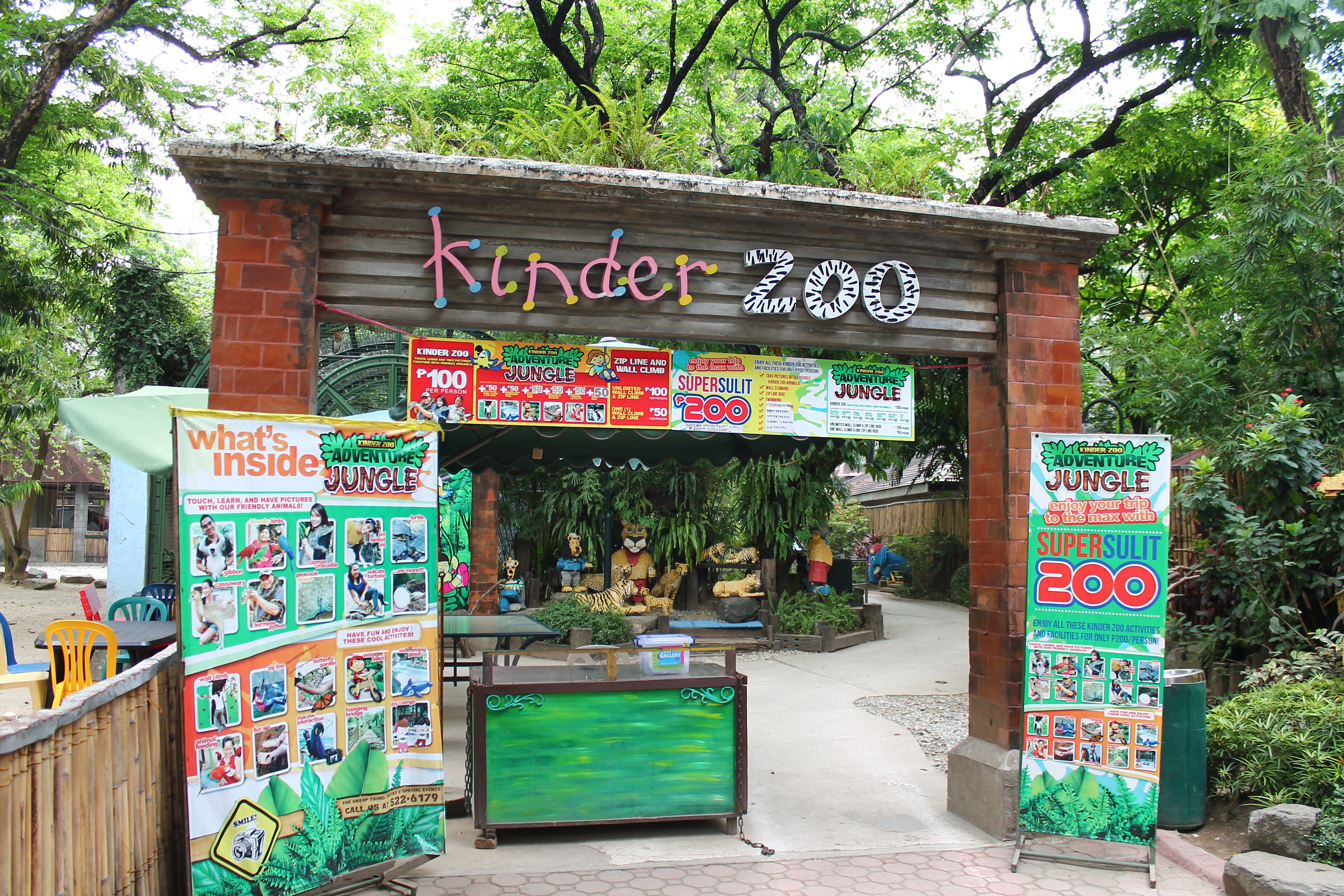
The Kinder Zoo area in 2012.

The Kinder Zoo within Manila Zoo was a result of a private-public partnership between Kinder Zoo, Inc. and the city government. Kinder Zoo, Inc. redeveloped 3,000 square meters (32,000 sq ft) of the zoo into an area named Kinder Zoo. The area was designed as a child-friendly area where children can interact with some animals of the zoo. The area featured a butterfly sanctuary, a hanging bridge, a flamingo pond, a barn for events, and a petting zoo upon its opening on June 23, 2000. The area was permanently closed on January 23, 2019.
