= Mangarap Ka =

2004 Philippine television drama series

- Also known as: You Dreamed
- Genre: Action; Drama; Adventure
- Created by: ABS-CBN Studios
- Developed by: ABS-CBN Studios
- Written by: Arah Jell Badayos
- Directed by: Malu Sevilla; Cathy Garcia-Molina; Rechie Del Carmen
- Starring: Piolo Pascual; Angelica Panganiban
- Opening theme: "Mangarap Ka" by Piolo Pascual
- Composer: Wency Cornejo
- Country of origin: Philippines
- Original language: Tagalog
- No. of episodes: 138

Production
- Executive producers: Carlo Katigbak; Cory Vidanes; Laurenti Dyogi
- Producer: Sheila Marie A. Ocampo
- Production location: Metro Manila
- Running time: 30-45 minutes
- Production company: Star Creatives

Original release
- Network: ABS-CBN
- Release: March 22 – October 8, 2004

Mangarap Ka (transl. You Dream, international title: You Dreamed) is a 2004 Philippine television drama series broadcast by ABS-CBN. Directed by Malu L. Sevilla and Cathy Garcia-Molina, starring Piolo Pascual and Angelica Panganiban. It aired on the network's afternoon line up and worldwide on TFC from March 22 to October 8, 2004, and was replaced by GetBackers.

== Premise ==
A light drama with elements of action and adventure, "Mangarap Ka" marks a new direction for its makers ABS-CBN, which has created and perfected the teleserye genre over the years. Spotlighting the colorful sights and sounds of downtown Manila, "Mangarap Ka" is set in Quiapo, where we meet Oslek (Piolo Pascual), a street-smart young man whose life is about to be changed when he meets a lost young boy named Tikoy (newcomer Steven Christian Fermo).

== Cast ==
=== Main cast ===
- Piolo Pascual as Celso "Oslek" Macapinlac Jr./Dragon King
- Angelica Panganiban as Catherine Sita "Cutie" Carter
- Steven Christian Fermo as Tikoy

=== Supporting cast ===
- Patrick Garcia as Tristan
- Miles Ocampo as Pepe/Pepay
- Rio Locsin as Jacqueline Catacutan Carter
- Nova Villa as Zoila Catacutan
- Pinky Amador as Junie Moon
- Nanding Josef as Samuel
- Ilonah Jean
- Dimples Romana as Fatima
- Kathryn Bernardo as Mimay

== Reruns ==
The show began airing reruns on Jeepney TV and All TV from May 31 to September 14, 2025 replacing the rerun of Ikaw Lamang and was replaced by the rerun of Ysabella.
