= Mali (elephant) =

Asian elephant at Manila Zoo (1974–2023)

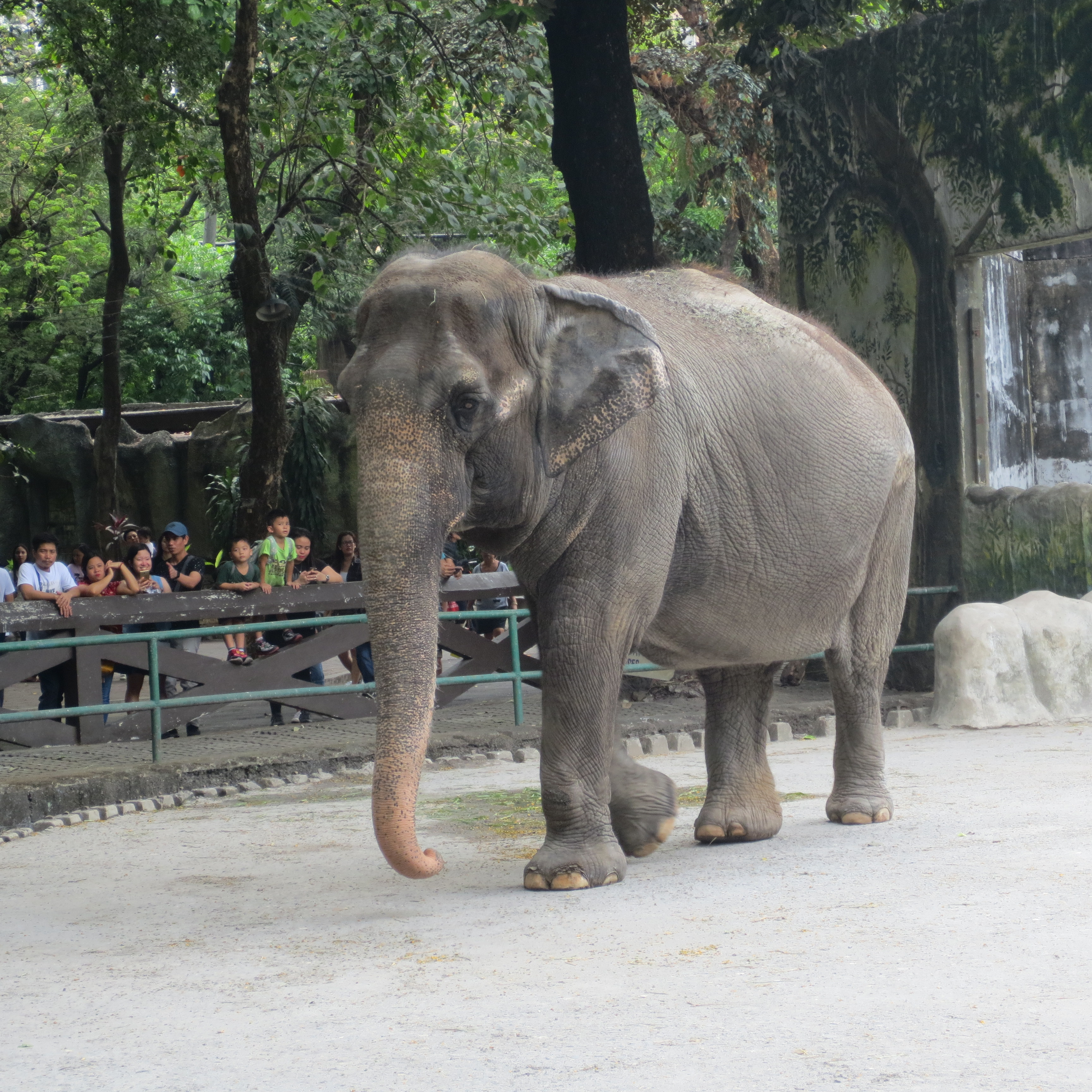
- Mali in 2018
- Species: Elephas maximus
- Sex: Female
- Born: Vishwa Ma'ali (Note: Alternatively spelled as Vishwamali); 1974–1980 (Note: Mali's exact age is uncertain; reportedly born as early as 1974 to as late as 1980.); Sri Lanka
- Died: November 28, 2023 (aged 43‍–‍49); Manila, Philippines
- Known for: Animal exhibit at the Manila Zoo

Vishwa Ma'ali (locally [bɪʃwɐˈmaːli, vɪʃ-]; d. November 28, 2023), commonly known as Mali (locally /ˈmɑːli/), was a female Asian elephant who lived at Manila Zoo in Manila, Philippines. Born in Sri Lanka, she was given as a gift to First Lady Imelda Marcos by the Sri Lankan government and lived at Manila Zoo from then on. For most of her life, she was the only elephant in the Philippines and was a subject of concern for animal welfare advocates. She was described as the world's "saddest" elephant.

== Early life ==
Vishwa Ma'ali, nicknamed Mali, was born in Sri Lanka. Mali was a female Asian elephant (Elephas maximus). Her exact birth date is unknown.

She was moved into the Pinnawala Elephant Orphanage after her mother died of natural causes. The Sri Lankan government gifted the elephant to then Philippine first lady Imelda Marcos. The elephant was presented at Malacañang Palace. She was transferred to the Manila Zoo when the animal was three years old.

== Captivity at Manila Zoo ==
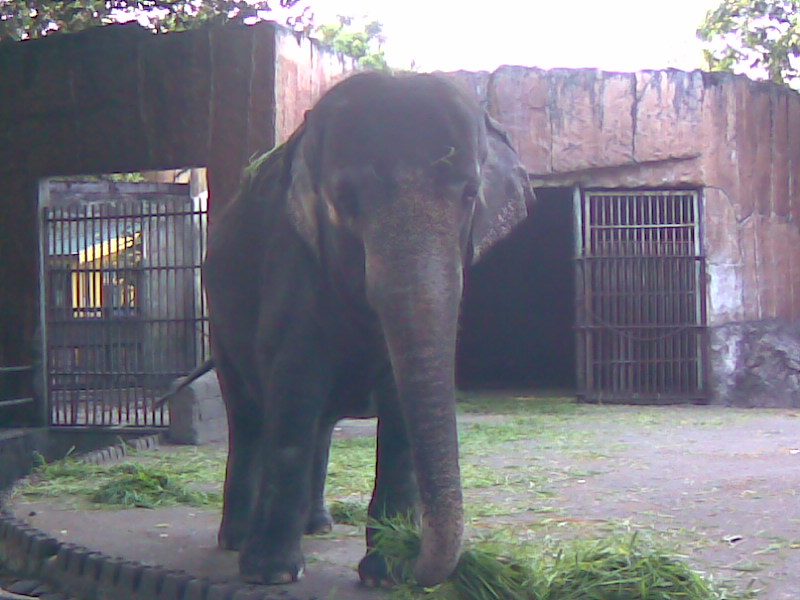
Mali in 2009

When Mali was moved to Manila Zoo, she was placed in an enclosure with another female elephant named Shiva. Shiva, who had been rescued from a circus, was territorial and behaved aggressively towards Mali. Following Shiva's death in 1990, Mali was able to roam around her enclosure more freely.

=== Treatment and condition ===
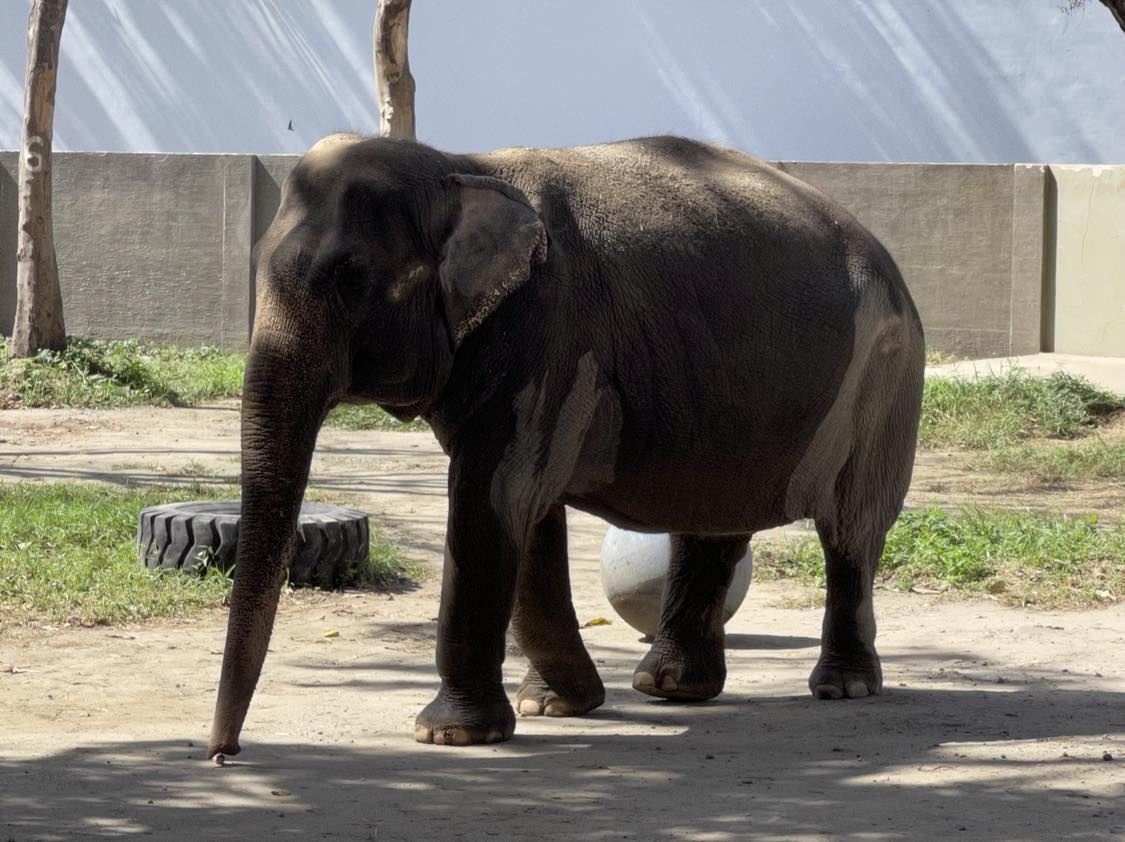
Mali in 2023

Mali's condition was a subject of concern by various animal welfare groups and was commonly called the world's 'saddest' elephant.

Mali was part of a campaign led by People for the Ethical Treatment of Animals (PETA) alleging the elephant was subject to neglect and was urging the release of the elephant. PETA campaigned for the move of Mali to an elephant sanctuary in Thailand, but there were concerns that the elephant might not be able to adapt to a new environment if moved out of the Manila Zoo. PETA alternatively had proposed that Mali be moved to the Elephant Sanctuary in the United States. The Network for Animals (NFA), which maintains a stance against zoos in general, made an exception for Mali. Despite its stance, the NFA expressed in 2018 that Manila Zoo was "the best option" in Mali's case.

There were also contrary reports which suggested Mali was healthy. In 2013, Mali underwent a checkup in a lead-up to a potential transfer to Thailand. Nikorn Thongtip of Kasetsart University remarked that Mali was "healthy in every system" although she exhibited "a little bit of obesity". Thongtip remarked that the elephant's nails "do not look bad, compared to elephants of the same age". Although Thongtip said that Mali had to be tested for tuberculosis, before she could be moved to Thailand. In 2018, results of blood tests conducted on Mali, suggested the elephant was healthy, although the animal was still remarked to be overweight and was on a diet plan.

=== Death ===
On November 28, 2023, Manila Mayor Honey Lacuna announced that Mali had died at around 3:45 p.m. (PHT) that day. The following day, the necropsy result was announced. She died of congestive heart failure and had other health issues: nodules around her liver, a slightly inflamed kidney, a neoplastic pancreas, and a clogged aorta.

== Preservation ==
The Manila city government announced plans to preserve Mali's remains and display them in a museum. Initially, there was consideration of requesting a replacement elephant from the Sri Lankan government, but this was later abandoned when a letter was sent to inform them of Mali's passing. The city government then entered into a contract with PetEterniTy to preserve Mali's remains through taxidermy, which took 11 months in Angat, Bulacan. Mali's remains were returned to the Manila Zoo on December 16, 2024, for display. On September 10, 2025, Manila Mayor Isko Moreno announced the transfer of Mali's remains to the National Museum of Natural History due to limited resources by the city government. The exhibit was officially unveiled on August 27, 2026.

== See also ==
- List of individual elephants
- Kabang
- Lolong
- Pag-asa
