= Gimik =

Philippine television youth-oriented series

- Title card
- Genre: Youth-oriented
- Written by: John D. Lazatin; Keiko Aquino Galvez; Marcia de Jesus
- Directed by: Laurenti M. Dyogi
- Starring: Judy Ann Santos; G. Toengi; Mylene Dizon
- Opening theme: "Gimik" by Jao Mapa
- Country of origin: Philippines
- Original language: Tagalog
- No. of seasons: 3
- No. of episodes: 131

Production
- Executive producers: Ethel Espiritu; Judith Bauer
- Running time: 90 minutes
- Production company: Dreamscape Entertainment

Original release
- Network: ABS-CBN
- Release: June 15, 1996 – February 6, 1999

Related
- Gimik 2010

Gimik is a Philippine television drama youth-oriented series broadcast by ABS-CBN. Directed by Laurenti Dyogi, it stars Judy Ann Santos, G. Toengi, and Mylene Dizon. It premiered on June 15, 1996 on the network's Saturday afternoon line up. The show concluded on February 6, 1999, with a total of 131 episodes.

The series is streaming online on YouTube.

== Premise ==
The series revolves around the daily lives, experiences, and structural struggles of 12 young individuals as they figure out their way in the world.

== Cast and characters ==
Gimik cast

Lead cast

- Judy Ann Santos as Dianne Villaruel
- G. Toengi as Angelina "Gina" de Leon
- Mylene Dizon as Melanie Suntay

Main cast

- Rico Yan as Ricardo "Ricky" Salveron
- Patrick Garcia as Carlo de Leon
- Diether Ocampo as Gary Leo "Gary" Ballesteros
- Jolina Magdangal as Socorro Corazon "Ese" Aragon
- Marvin Agustin as Joseph "Joey" Fajardo
- Bojo Molina as Brian Lorenzo
- Diego Castro III as Jigs Mercado
- Kaye Abad as Cassandra "Kakai" Marquez

Supporting cast

- Kristopher Peralta as Teofilo "Toffee" Sanchez
- Andrea Blaesi as Andi Cuyugan
- LJ Moreno as Cathy Dominguez
- Dominic Ochoa as Eric Abesamis / Dennis
- Kristine Hermosa as Tintin Fernandez
- Rica Peralejo as Jersey Salveron
- Paula Peralejo as Pauline Salveron
- John Lloyd Cruz as Junie de Dios
- Cheska Garcia as Corrine Apostol
- Baron Geisler as Choy Ledesma
- Carlos Agassi as Marco Trinidad
- Laura James as Cindy Trinidad
- Desiree del Valle as Dette Zubiri

Extended and guest cast

- Trisha Salvador as Kara
- Claudine Barretto as Danielle
- Wowie de Guzman as Warren
- Mark Vernal as Banjo Mejia
- Jodi Santamaria as Gretchen
- Vanessa del Bianco as Daphne Ortiz
- Katrina de Leon as Matet
- John Arcilla as Cesar Rivera
- Patrick Fiori as Miguel Montejo
- William Thio as Dave Apostol
- Donnie Fernandez as Chad Fernando
- Anna Larrucea as Yanna Cortez
- Tanya Garcia as Angela
- Bernard Palanca as Skud Torres
- Miguel dela Rosa as Migs
- Don Laurel as Dondi Arenas
- Nikki Valdez as Jek-Jek
- Monica Verallo as Caroline
- Miggy Tanchanco as Mikoy Cervantes
- Andrea del Rosario as Samantha Banzon
- Justin Cuyugan as James
- Lui Villaruz as Dexter Agcaoili
- Julia Clarete as Jules
- Gerard Pizzaras as Jerry
- Jhezarie Javier (Diana Enriquez) as Denise Salvador
- Kathleen Hermosa as Myra Suntay
- Alwyn Uytingco as Joey's younger brother
- Patricia Ann Roque as Ese's sister
- Yayo Aguila as Dette's mother
- Boboy Garovillo as Ese's father
- Jim Paredes as Kakai's father
- Vivian Foz as Ese's mother
- Hajji Alejandro as Dianne's father
- Beverly Vergel as Dianne's mother
- Orestes Ojeda as Ricky's father
- Amado Cortez as Tanya's grandfather
- Roy Alvarez as Joey's father
- Mia Gutierrez as Joey's mother
- Ray Ventura as Mr. Suntay
- Raquel Villavicencio as Gary's mother
- Jon AchavaL as Marco and Cindy's father
- Lorli Villanueva as Gina and Carlo's grandmother
- Anna Marin as Brian's mother
- Malou de Guzman as Mrs. Suntay
- Ricky Belmonte as Brian's father
- Subas Herrero as Corrine's father
- Dick Israel as Mr. Arenas
- Eula Valdez as Brenda
- Amy Perez as Guy
- Gio Alvarez

== Film adaptation ==
GIMIK: The Reunion
- Directed by: Laurenti M. Dyogi
- Written by: Marcia de Jesus; Keiko Aquino
- Produced by: Charo Santos-Concio
- Starring: Rico Yan; Jolina Magdangal; Marvin Agustin; G. Toengi; Diether Ocampo; Mylene Dizon; Bojo Molina; Judy Ann Santos
- Cinematography: Joe Tutanes
- Edited by: Joyce Bernal
- Music by: Nonong Buencamino
- Production company: Star Cinema
- Release date: April 27, 1999
- Running time: 115 minutes
- Country: Philippines
- Language: Filipino

Motion picture release Gimik: The Reunion was later made and was released on April 27, 1999. The film retains all the main characters—Ricky, Ese, Joey, Gina, Gary, Melanie and Bryan look forward to love, marriage and career. Judy Ann Santos made a special appearance as her character Dianne in the latter part of the film. Kristine Hermosa and Dominic Ochoa, a regular cast since 1997, made cameo appearances in the movie with different roles.

=== Soundtrack ===
The Original Motion Picture Soundtrack to the film was released on March 30, 1999, two months before the release of the film. With its carrier single "Mahal Mo Ba Ako" by Jolina Magdangal, the soundtrack earned a Gold Record Certification from the Philippine Association of the Record Industry on May 7, 1999. Adapted from the GIMIK: The Reunion Original Motion Picture Soundtrack liner notes.

No.	Title	Writer(s)	Length
1.	"Kahit Anong Mangyari" (Recorded by Jeremiah and Richard Marten)	Vehnee Saturno	4:42
2.	"Mahal Mo Ba Ako" (Recorded by Jolina Magdangal)	Jimmy Antiporda	3:32
3.	"What Good Is That Without You" (Recorded by Christine Tenza)	Toti Fuentes / Jose Gabriel M. La Vina	4:20
4.	"Allryte Sa Gimik" (Recorded by Jolina Magdangal with Boomroom)	Boomroom / Boomroom - Annabelle Regalado	4:00
5.	"Don't Know What To Do" (Recorded by 92 A.D.)	Odette Quesada	2:49
6.	"Love Sweet Love" (Recorded by Jeffrey Hidalgo and Arnee Hidalgo)	Jeffrey Hidalgo and Arnee Hidalgo	5:28
7.	"Let This Love Grow" (Recorded by Roselle Nava and Richard Marten)	Vehnee Saturno and Enrico Santos	4:49
8.	"Bakit Ikaw Pa Rin" (Recorded by Noah Sindac)	Larry Hermoso	4:34
9.	"First Time" (Recorded by Girltalk)	Larry Hermoso	4:28
10.	"Kahit Anong Mangyari" (Recorded by All Star GIMIK Cast)	Vehnee Saturno	4:33
11.	"G-MIK (Bonus cut)" (Recorded by John Prats, Carlo Aquino, Stephano Mori)	Jimmy Antiporda - Cymbee Antiporda	2:07

== Gimik 2010 ==
In the ABS-CBN's 2010 Trade Launch, it announced that the series will return on television as part of Your Song with the title of Gimik 2010.
