= Sa Piling Mo =

2006 Philippine television drama series

- Title card
- Also known as: Here With Me
- Genre: Drama; Romance
- Created by: ABS-CBN Studios
- Developed by: ABS-CBN Studios; Malou N. Santos; Des M. De Guzman-Tanwangco
- Written by: Denise O'Hara; Francis Xavier E. Pasion
- Directed by: Jerry Lopez Sineneng; Trina N. Dayrit; Rory Quintos
- Starring: Judy Ann Santos; Piolo Pascual
- Opening theme: "Ikaw Lamang" by Piolo Pascual
- Ending theme: "Dahil Ikaw" by True Faith
- Composer: Dodjie Simon
- Country of origin: Philippines
- Original language: Tagalog
- No. of episodes: 128

Production
- Executive producers: Carlo Katigbak; Cory Vidanes; Laurenti Dyogi; Malou Santos
- Producers: Des De Guzman-Tanwangco; Mylene H. Ongkiko; Sackey Prince Pendatun
- Production locations: Metro Manila; Laguna; Batangas
- Editors: Sonny de Jesus; Roy Francia; Marianne Feliciano
- Running time: 30-40 minutes
- Production company: Star Creatives

Original release
- Network: ABS-CBN
- Release: February 27 – August 25, 2006

Related
- Nasaan Ka, Elisa? Ikaw Lamang

Sa Piling Mo (International title: Here With Me / transl. with you) is a 2006 Philippine television drama romance series broadcast by ABS-CBN. Directed by Jerry Lopez Sineneng, Trina N. Dayrit and Rory Quintos, it stars Judy Ann Santos and Piolo Pascual. It aired on the network's Primetime Bida line up from February 27 to August 25, 2006, replacing Mga Anghel na Walang Langit and was replaced by Super Inggo.

== Cast and characters ==
- Jennifer Limbaga (Judy Ann Santos) is the street-smart cockfighting expert who's willing to risk life and limb to restore Adrian's eyesight. She is forced to assume a new identity as Catherine Chuatoco, the widow of a Chuatoco scion and a courageous woman who's willing to protect her son at all costs and fight for the man she loves.
- Adrian Tuazon (Piolo Pascual) plays Jennifer's blind childhood sweetheart. Determined to overcome his blindness, he supports himself as a folk singer and was about to propose to Jennifer when fate intervened and the two lovers are separated. He falls in love with Nicole, the woman who saves him from destitution and restores his eyesight.
- Benicio Chuatoco (Albert Martinez) is the Congressman's son who fulfills his father's dying wish to protect Jennifer. He pretends to be Jennifer's brother-in-law but eventually falls in love with her. A shrewd and cunning businessman, he gets involved with business partner Nicole when Jennifer rejects him.
- Nicole Fuentebella (Rica Peralejo) is the beautiful heiress to the Azucarera fortune who saves Adrian and restores his eyesight. At first, she is a sweet woman whose father looks down on her but runs her family business after a mild stroke she is incapable of losing Adrian in the second book (season) of the series she happens to have a child with special needs. She helped Adrian forget Jennifer and eventually became his fiancée. She discovered the truth behind Jennifer's identity and hid the truth from Adrian.
- Nanay Gina (Liza Lorena) plays Adrian's surrogate mother. She rescues him after falling unconscious on the rail tracks and nurses him back to health.
- Al Fernandez (Bembol Roco) plays Jennifer's godfather and he used to be her mother's ardent suitor.. He became a holy man when a priest rescued him from the Mayor's attempt on his life. He is torn between telling the truth to Adrian or keeping his promise of secrecy to Jennifer.
- Jose Fuentebella (Mat Ranillo III) is the rich owner of the Azucarera who's a devoted husband and a loving father to Nicole.
- Marissa (Maja Salvador) plays a simple provincial lass who dreams of a better life for herself and her family. She is torn between Tatum and his "kinakapatid", Russel.
- Tatum (Raphael Martinez) is Adrian's surrogate brother. Resentful of his mother's partiality to Adrian, he deliberately rebels and disobeys his mother. He falls in love with Marissa.
- Jason (Jason Gainza) is Adrian's humorous sidekick and co-worker at the Azucarera.
- Norma (Lotlot de Leon) is the head of the farmers at the Azucarera. She is also Marissa's mother and Russell's guardian. Later, she confesses to a long-kept secret—Benicio is Russell's father.
- Russell (John Wayne Sace) plays a young farmer who's secretly in love with Marissa. Later, he discovers that he's Benicio's love child.
- Congressman Chuatoco (Chinggoy Alonzo) plays Jennifer's patron who rescues her from the Mayor's goons. He eventually dies of a heart attack and leaves Jennifer in his son's care.
- Mayor (Charlie Davao) is a vile man who's addicted to gambling during cockfights. He enlists Jennifer's expertise as his adviser but when she tricks him in a gambling bet with the Congressman, he resolves to make Jennifer's life a living hell.
- Jeremy (Basty Alcances) plays Jennifer and Adrian's love child.
- Shirley (Ella V) is Jennifer's best friend after Adrian. They reunited when Jennifer married Benicio. She supports Jennifer in everything except for being a martyr to her abusive husband.
- Julia (Pia Wurtzbach) is Russell's balikbayan girlfriend and business partner. She doesn't know how deep Russell's feelings are for Marissa.
- Diego Castro III - as Marco Jimenez
- Joshua Dionisio - as young Adrian Tuazon
- Mikylla Ramirez - as young Jennifer Limabaga

== Accolades ==
- Sa Piling Mo was awarded Best Drama Series by the 2006 PMPC (Philippine Movie Press Club) Star Awards For TV with its lead stars nominated for Best Actor and Actress.
- During the final wedding scene, Adrian and Jennifer are to be wed near a beach, they hug each other instead of the usual concluding wedding kiss. This was due to Judy Ann Santos' deep commitment to her then real-life boyfriend and now husband, former Krystala co-star, Ryan Agoncillo.
- According to AGB Nielsen (Philippines) Mega Manila data, Sa Piling Mo got a PILOT Rating of 28.4% and Ended with an IMPRESSIVE Rating of 35.3% leading I LUV NY (28.6%) by 6.7%
  - This was the Figure: August 25, 2006 (Friday) I LUV NY (GMA) 28.6% vs. Sa Piling Mo FINALE (ABS-CBN) 35.3%
- The final episode was shown without any commercial interruptions courtesy of Globe Telecom, a cellular phone company in the Philippines. It is unknown how much Globe paid for a no-commercial break show. This is also a first in Philippine TV history for a primetime drama show to air without commercial breaks.
- Sa Piling Mo became a regional semi-finalist in the International Emmy Awards for the Drama Series category. Other ABS-CBN programs were also nominated, including Super Inggo for the "Children and Young People" category Bandila and TV Patrol World for the News category. Bandila made it as a finalist under the News category, and made history by being the first ever nominated news program from the Philippines.

== See also ==
- List of programs broadcast by ABS-CBN
- List of ABS-CBN Studios original drama series
- List of programs broadcast by Jeepney TV
