= Walang Kapalit =

Philippine television series

- Title card
- Genre: Drama; Romance
- Created by: ABS-CBN Studios
- Based on: Hindi Nahahati ang Langit by Mike De Leon
- Written by: Keiko Aquino
- Directed by: Wenn V. Deramas
- Starring: Claudine Barretto; Piolo Pascual
- Theme music composer: Rey Valera
- Opening theme: "Walang Kapalit" by Piolo Pascual
- Country of origin: Philippines
- Original language: Filipino
- No. of episodes: 95

Production
- Executive producers: Roldeo T. Endrinal; Emerald Suarez
- Running time: 12-34 minutes
- Production company: Dreamscape Entertainment TV

Original release
- Network: ABS-CBN
- Release: April 23 – August 31, 2007

Walang Kapalit (transl. irreplaceable) is a 2007 Philippine television drama series broadcast by ABS-CBN. The series is based on a 1985 Philippine film Hindi Nahahati ang Langit, and adaptation of Nerissa Cabral's earlier komiks version of the same title. Directed by Wenn Deramas, it stars Piolo Pascual and Claudine Barretto. It aired on the network's Primetime Bida line up and worldwide on TFC from April 23 to August 31, 2007, replacing Sana Maulit Muli and was replaced by Pangarap na Bituin.

It is streaming online on YouTube.

== Plot ==
Ariston (Edu Manzano) and Agnes (Dina Bonnevie) marry, and their children Noel (Piolo Pascual) and Melanie (Claudine Barretto) become step-siblings after the marriage. Although Melanie hopes that Noel will be a protective older brother, he dislikes her because he thinks that she and her mother replaced his mother in his father's heart. They bicker, and their relationship worsens when Ariston favors Melanie over his son. Ceding, the family nanny (Amy Austria), is unusually dedicated to Noel. Noel is driven to continue his studies in Australia; he meets Cynthia (Jodi Sta. Maria), his best friend Bryan's (DJ Durano) sister, who has bipolar disorder. Cynthia is in love with Noel, but her love is unrequited.

Noel gets in a car accident in Australia, and the family rushes to his side. He and Melanie fall in love as she takes care of him, but their parents are opposed to the relationship. Ceding admits to Agnes that she is Noel's mother; Ariston is not his father, but his half-brother. Although Ariston throws her out for breaking her promise to his father, he takes her back and promises to tell Noel the truth someday.

Noel nurtures his relationship with Melanie, but Cynthia is determined to win him. When Agnes dies of a heart attack, Cynthia withholds the news from Noel, thereby creating a rift between him and Melanie. Noel visits Agnes' grave, and promises to protect Melanie. Ariston dies in an accident before he can reveal the truth about his and Noel's relationship. Melanie sees the death of their parents as punishment for her love with Noel, and breaks up with him; Noel, however, is appointed her legal guardian. Melanie graduates with honors; a misunderstanding during her graduation party results in her impulsive decision to marry Ronald (Bobby Andrews), the son of wealthy and powerful Arnold Santillian (Lloyd Samartino).

Noel and Melanie find themselves in unhappy marriages. Ronald abuses the pregnant Melanie who later on miscarries, and Cynthia's insecurities tax Noel's good nature. Noel and Melanie are co-workers, and bond again. They find refuge in their friendship; Ronald and Cynthia have an affair, and their encounter is caught on camera and becomes a sex tape. Ronald uses the footage to blackmail Cynthia, hoping that Noel's life will be worse than his own. Moody (Candy Pangilinan) discovers the video and tells Melanie, who decides to keep it secret. Ronald exposes it, leaving everyone connected to him and Cynthia stunned by the scandal. Noel and Melanie file for divorce and annulment from their respective spouses, and Cynthia tries to burn down Ronald's house in revenge. She is admitted to a mental hospital, where she meets Dr. Victor Hizon (TJ Trinidad).

Years later, Noel and Melanie reunite and marry. Soon after Melanie learns she is pregnant, however, Ronald and Cynthia reappear seeking revenge. Arnold's business is bankrupt, and he blames Ronald. Melanie gives Arnold and Elaine (Susan Africa) money from her mother's estate.

Arnold accuses Melanie of murdering Ronald, and Noel believes that he broke his promise to Agnes to protect Melanie. Cynthia, who has avenged Ronald for destroying her marriage to Noel, kidnaps Noel and Melanie's newborn child and renames him Ernest.

Four years later, Rodney comes forward as a witness of Ronald's murder by Cynthia. She is arrested, and Melanie is released. Bryan tells Noel that Cynthia has his son. Ernest recognizes Cynthia as his mother, and refuses to warm up to his biological parents. Melanie becomes a maid to be close to Ernest, and Victor commits suicide.

Noel finally discovers that Ceding is his mother; angry at first, he accepts her. Cynthia, however, is unwilling to tell Ernest about his biological parents. They are having a heart-to-heart talk on the prison roof when Melanie arrives, followed by Bryan and Noel. After taking Ernest hostage, she eventually releases the child and commits suicide. Noel and Melanie finally live peacefully with Ernest, Ceding, and Moody.

== Cast and characters ==
=== Main cast ===
- Claudine Barretto as Melanie Santillan-Borromeo
- Piolo Pascual as Noel Borromeo

=== Supporting cast ===
- Edu Manzano as Ariston Borromeo
- Dina Bonnevie as Agnes Borromeo
- Amy Austria as Yaya Ceding
- Bobby Andrews as Ronald Santillian
- Jodi Sta. Maria as Cynthia Bermudez-Hizon
- Nikki Valdez as Recy, Melanie's best friend
- DJ Durano as Bryan Bermudez, Noel's best friend
- Candy Pangilinan as Moody, Ariston's new maid
- Lloyd Samartino as Arnold Santillian
- Susan Africa as Elaine Santillian, Arnold's wife
- Eda Nolan as Vanessa Santillian, Ronald's younger sister
- Victor Basa as Miguel, Ceding's nephew
- Joem Bascon as Anton, Vanessa's boyfriend
- Kakai Bautista as Angel, Noel's secretary
- TJ Trinidad as Dr. Victor Hizon, Cynthia's psychiatrist

=== Guest cast ===
- Sam Concepcion as young Noel
- Julia Barretto as young Melanie
- Lailani Navarro as Dianne Bermudez, Bryan's wife
- Josh Ivan Morales as Roderick Suarez
- Marco Aytona as Rodney

== See also ==
- List of programs broadcast by ABS-CBN
- List of ABS-CBN Studios original drama series
