= List of Wansapanataym episodes =

Wansapanataym is a Philippine fantasy anthology television series produced and broadcast by ABS-CBN.

== Series overview ==
=== Original series ===
Season (s)	Episodes	Originally aired	
Season (s)	Episodes	Season premiere	Season finale
1	141	June 22, 1997	February 25, 2001
2	186	March 4, 2001	August 29, 2004
3	24	September 5, 2004	February 27, 2005

=== Revival series ===
Season (s)	Episodes	Originally aired	
Season (s)	Episodes	Season premiere	Season finale
1	28	September 11, 2010	March 26, 2011
2	38	April 2, 2011	December 31, 2011
3	41	January 7, 2012	November 3, 2012
4	31	November 10, 2012	June 22, 2013
5	48	June 29, 2013	June 8, 2014
6	83	June 15, 2014	November 1, 2015
7	172	November 8, 2015	April 7, 2019

== Episode list ==
=== Original series (1997–2005) ===
==== Season 1 (1997–2001) ====
No. in season	Title	Creator	Original release date
1	"Ang Mahiwagang Palasyo"	Johnny Manahan	June 22, 1997
A story about Rico who found a miniature castle that transport him to a world of fairy tales where Princess Leyla lived. In the end, Princess Leyla returns to Rico's world and never come back to her world forever only to love Rico. Cast: Pocholo Montes, Judy Ann Santos, Rico Yan, Charlie Davao, Marita Zobel, Luz Fernandez, Tiya Pusit, Raquel Montessa, Archie Adamos
2	"Daga"	Allan Bryan Gerangue	June 29, 1997
A story about an overreacting girl named Angeli who was frustrated because of her father's trip. In the house, two big rats were roaming around the house. Cast: Jolina Magdangal, Chubi del Rosario, Jaime Fabregas, Errol Dionisio
3	"Salamin"	Jose Javier Reyes	June 29, 1997
A story about a mysterious mirror that sucked people inside the mirror's world. Cast: Al Tantay, Isabel Rivas, Kristopher Peralta, CJ Ramos, Ogie Diaz
4	"Twinkle"	Jerry Lopez Sineneng	July 6, 1997
A story about a poor girl named Len who wants a family that lived together with his young brother. With the help of a pixie named Twinkle, she will make her wish come true. In the end, Len's wish came true. Cast: Glydel Mercado, Angelica Panganiban, CJ Ramos, Michael Roy Jornales, Jon Achaval, Ama Quiambao, Mel Kimura, Derick Carmona
5	"Nuno Ko Po"	Eric Quizon	July 13, 1997
A story about Carlos who destroys an anthill where a dwarf lives. The dwarf became very angry, so he cursed Mario that his girlfriend Lilian will experience a mysterious illness. Cast: G. Toengi, Wowie de Guzman, Ces Quesada, Tiya Pusit, Errol Dionisio, Cris Daluz, Goliath, Angela Zamora, Jack Walker
6	"Ang Hiwaga ng Gintong Piseta"	Jerry Lopez Sineneng	July 20, 1997
A story about Dicky, a boy who secretly steals a golden coin from a museum. Later, a monster comes out from the coin and starts to attack Dicky's family. Cast: Patrick Garcia, Camille Prats, Stefano Mori, Ani Pearl Alonzo, Karl Angelo Legaspi, Koko Trinidad, Marvin Agustin, Mat Ranillo III, Teresa Loyzaga, Connie Chua, Froilan Sales, Joel Saracho, Aleli Baguio, McMac Lopez
7	"Mahiwagang Sapatos"	Emil Cruz Jr.	July 27, 1997
Spencer Torres suffered a car accident before creating a fracture to his left leg has his life as miserable as he knows it, this guy will experience an extraordinary event that will change everything about him. Sometime after the accident, he prayed that if only he could walk and be back on dancing again then he could help himself to go back to school and find his other relatives who are far away from the city. One day, he saw a glowing black pair of shoes. When he wore the shoes, he immediately become able to walk straight but if he tries to take it off, he returns to his original state. He continued to use the shoes for money and good deeds, the shoes was revealed possessed by a dancer spirit who wants to help the teenager guy. At the end of the story, when the ghost finally fulfilled his mission to help the young guy, he finally went to heaven and Spencer, the one who wore the shoes was healed. Cast: Spencer Reyes, Emilio Garcia, Lara Morena, Luz Fernandez, Dan Castro, Richard Kwan, Alwyn Uytingco, Donnie Fernandez, Anton Sta. Maria
8	"Dama de Noche"	Eric Quizon	August 3, 1997
Cast: Eric Quizon, Alice Dixson, Caridad Sanchez, Paolo Zobel
9	"Mail in Heaven"	Edwin O'Hara	August 10, 1997
Cast: Joel Torre, Maricel Laxa, Subas Herrero, Beverly Salviejo, Patricia Ann Roque, Lailani Navarro, Gerard Pizarras
10	"Imaginary Friend" (Note: The episode used the opening theme song of the 1992 animated film Tom and Jerry: The Movie in one scene.)	Edwin O'Hara	August 17, 1997
A story about a boy named Ken who meets his magical imaginary friend. Cast: CJ Ramos, Smokey Manaloto, Yayo Aguila, Rex Agoncillo, Rosa Rosal
11	"Melchora Meets Cedie"	Emil Cruz Jr.	August 24, 1997
Cast: Anjo Yllana, Angelica Panganiban, Stefano Mori, Gina Pareño
12	"Balete"	Jerry Lopez Sineneng	August 31, 1997
Mike wanted to cut the mysterious tree in his house. An old man warns him that he should never cut the tree. When the tree was cut, the fairy's son died. She cursed Mike's wife Jackie that their baby will be killed using her powers. Cast: Janice de Belen, John Estrada, Mely Tagasa, Cris Daluz, Mel Kimura, Karl Angelo Legaspi, McMac Lopez, Ilonah Jean
13	"Kapirasong Langit"	Chito S. Roño	September 7, 1997
Young girl Heidi suffers the abuse of her mother Glenda after the death of her husband. Meanwhile, Heidi discovers the magic of an angel statue. In the end, Heidi's mother ask forgiveness to her and Heidi accepts it. Cast: Rita Avila, Shaina Magdayao, Alma Lerma, Rubi Rosa
14	"Tres Marias"	Emil Cruz Jr.	September 14, 1997
Cast: Ludovico Legaspi, Nikki Valdez, Paula Peralejo, Kathleen Hermosa, Anne Villegas, Tom Olivar, Rosanna Jover, Miguel dela Rosa, Carlo Aquino, Dino Banzon, Charito Solis
15	"Touch of Gold"	Wenn V. Deramas	September 21, 1997
A story about a man who can touch anything into gold. Cast: John Estrada, Jennifer Mendoza, Bella Flores, Anita Linda, Maggie dela Riva, Gloria Sevilla, Mely Tagasa, Pocholo Montes, Missy King, Mark Angelo Wilson
16	"Episode 16"	Emil Cruz Jr.	September 28, 1997
Cast: William Martinez, Jean Garcia, Lee Robin Salazar, Glenda Garcia, Bong Regala
17	"Prinsipe Patrick"	Johnny Manahan	October 5, 1997
Prince Patrick steals a magical potion from his wizard until he fell down to a portal to the modern time. In the modern time, Prince Patrick meet friends there. When they were in danger, the prince will drink the potion and save his friends using his superpowers. In the end, Marlon, the wizard comes to the modern time and to take Prince Patrick back to their world. Cast: Patrick Garcia, Subas Herrero, Lou Veloso, Ching Arellano, Carlo Aquino, Jefferson Long, Doods Peralejo, Rodney Shattara, Andrea Del Rosario, Star Circle 5, Yda Yaneza, Gandong Cervantes, Bert Cayanan
18	"Inakupu! Muumuu!"	Emil Cruz Jr.	October 12, 1997
Three friends went on an extraordinary trip. They got stuck in a forest. There, they find a house which is owned by a family. The family who live there can help them but, they wanted to eat them. Can the three friends escape them? Cast: Gio Alvarez, J.R. Herrera, Carol Banawa, Jean Saburit, Dindo Arroyo, Sheila Ysrael, Toby Alejar, Alfred Manal
19	"Mahiwagang Paru-Paro"	Laurenti M. Dyogi	October 19, 1997
A story about Delfin, a father who sacrifices his life from a magical butterfly only for his dying child Ana. Cast: Caridad Sanchez, Berting Labra, Julio Diaz, Lorena Garcia
20	"Ang Sumpa"	Jerry Lopez Sineneng	October 26, 1997
A story about Hanna who is cursed by her mother's former boyfriend Mario. His curse was whoever may fall in love with Hana's mother including Hana will die. Cast: Elizabeth Oropesa, Tirso Cruz III, Mylene Dizon, Bojo Molina
21	"Genie Om-Om"	Johnny Manahan	November 2, 1997
A story about a happy-go-lucky genie who comes out from a bottle in front of a poor family. The genie gave them three wishes. Most of their wishes are just a waste. The poor family learned that loving each other is more important than making their wishes come true. Cast: Vhong Navarro, Donita Rose, Diether Ocampo, Raquel Villavicencio, Emman Abeleda, Piel Moreno
22	"X-Deal"	Eric Quizon	November 9, 1997
A story about a lawyer and his girlfriend who switched souls after a car accident. Cast: Beth Tamayo, Romnick Sarmenta, Alicia Alonzo, Maritoni Fernandez, Metring David, William Thio, Arman De Guzman
23	"BOW-WOW-WOW"	Edwin O'Hara	November 16, 1997
Cast: Angel Aquino, Mandy Ochoa, Archie Adamos, Carol Banawa, Agatha Tapan, Melissa Avelino, Nica Peralejo, Serena Dalrymple, Princess Punzalan
24	"Si Marissa, Si Luisa"	Nick Lizaso	November 23, 1997
Cast: Giselle "G" Toengi, Julia Clarete, Penn Medina, Dominic Ochoa, Tanya Garcia, Don Laurel, Mark Vernal, Celia Rodriguez
25	"Broken Wings"	Ruel S. Bayani	November 30, 1997
Cast: Sharmaine Arnaiz, Victor Neri, Leandro Baldemor, Candy Pangilinan, Richard Quan
26	"Mighty Liling"	Unknown	December 7, 1997
Cast: Camille Prats
27	"Patay-Patayan, Buhay-Buhayan"	Emil Cruz Jr.	December 14, 1997
Cast: Ian De Leon, Rica Peralejo, Gino Antonio, Sabrina M., Tita de Villa, Johnny Vicar, Alwyn Uytingco, Karl Angelo Legaspi, Tony Carreon, Buddy Palad, Mosang, Denise Joaquin, Corrine Mendez, Mike Verano, Eric Laygo
28	"The Christmas Witch"	Jerry Lopez Sineneng	December 21, 1997
Lucring, a human who is cursed to be a witch. One day, she gave up being a witch. She wished that she will become a human again. One night, Santa and Lucring collided in the air. The next day, Santa was unable to give the gifts to the children because he losts his sleigh and gifts. With the help of Susie, a neglected child, Lucring and Susie team up to deliver the gifts. In the end, instead of being human again, Lucring remains herself as a witch but she will do good things. Cast: Ms. Susan Roces, Subas Herrero, Patricia Ann Roque, Berting Labra, Beverly Salviejo, Ricky Antenor, Kat-Kat Aguila, Blanca Aguila
29	"Stopwatch"	Johnny Manahan	December 28, 1997
Cast: Angelika Dela Cruz, Jericho Rosales, Maila Gumila, Lailani Navarro, Sherilyn Reyes, Minnie Aguilar, Zorayda Sanchez, Wilson Go, Maimai Davao, Alexis Aguilar
30	"The Wishing Fountain"	Johnny Manahan	1997
Jimboy feels neglected because his father always giving him broken promises. Jimboy runs away and found a wishing fountain. He wishes that his father fails to make people amazed in his magic show. The next day, his wish came true but the problem was that his father got fired. Will Jimboy realize that his wish is a bad idea? Cast: Bayani Agbayani, Rita Avila, Vandolph Quizon, John Prats, Errol Dionisio, Augusto Victa
31	"Si Peping Bulilit at ang Dilaw na Diwata"	Ruel S. Bayani	January 1998
Cast: Lester Llansang, Mumay Santiago, Joy Viado, Monina Bagatsing, Kathleen Hermosa, Missy King, Pupi Pla, Princess Schuck, Caridad Sanchez
32	"Larawan ng Prinsipe"	Johnny Manahan	January 1998
Cast: Julia Clarete, Gerard Pizarras, Sylvia Sanchez, Luz Valdez, Marita Zobel, Steven Alonzo, Wacky Roxas, Sarji Ruiz, Rad Dominguez, Mike Verano
33	"Bana Bana Black"	Don Miguel Cuaresma	January 1998
Cast: Spencer Reyes, Baron Geisler, J.R. Herrera, Miguel De La Rosa, Justin Cuyugan, Marcus Madrigal, Lui Villaruz, Jinky Oda, Arlyn S. Tolibas, Jaclyn Jose
34	"Maldita"	Eric Quizon	January 1998
Cast: Tanya Garcia, Kristopher Peralta, Francesca Garcia, Carlos Agassi
35	"Konsensya"	TBD	1998
Cast: Camille Prats
36	"Speredebel"	Ruel S. Bayani	February 1998
Cast: Rustom Padilla, Sharmaine Suarez, Victoria Haynes, Benjie Paras
37	"Ang Itlog... Bow!"	Johnny Manahan	February 1998
Cast: CJ Ramos, John Prats, Winnie Cordero, Richard Quan, Allyzon Lualhati, Princess Schuck, Marga Madrilejos, John Gaddi, Desiree del Valle, Marianne dela Riva
38	"Napadpad, Lilipad"	Ruel S. Bayani	1998
Cast: Gerard Pizarras, Jan Marini Alano, Emman Abeleda, Jojo Isla, Aleli Baguio, Gabby Lim
39	"Wish Monster"	Don Michael Cuaresma	1998
Cast: Alwyn Uytingco, Agatha Tapan, Anna Larrucea, Mark Vernal, Goliath, Elizabeth Oropesa
40	"I Love You... Again, Again, Again"	Ruel S. Bayani	1998
Cast: Sharmaine Arnaiz, Dominique Ochua, Arman De Guzman, Evangeline Pascual, Noel Trinidad, Empress Schuck, BJ de Jesus
41	"Mother Knows Best"	Don Michael Cuaresma	1998
Cast: Sunshine Cruz, Kier Legaspi, Princess Schuck, Toby Alejar, Cherry Pie Picache
42	"Chemistry"	Wenn V. Deramas	1998
Cast: Guila Alvarez, Gio Alvarez, Luigi Alvarez, Carol Banawa, Dimples Romana, Tanya Garcia, Kathleen Hermosa, Monina Bagatsing, Steven Alonzo, Donnie Fernandez, Lui Villaruz, Justin Cuyugan, Jovy Long, Eugene Domingo, Joel Torre
43	"Islaw Palitaw"	Wenn V. Deramas	1998
Cast: Kristopher Peralta, Lui Villaruz, Yda Yaneza, Richard Quan, Mark Vernal, Dino Guevarra, Berting Labra
44	"Dondi and the 3 Babes"	Ruel S. Bayani	1998
Cast: Anjo Yllana, Lito Legaspi, Beth Tamayo, Racquel Villavicencio, Tom Olivar, Bong Regala, Criselda Volks, Ursula Ortiz, Diana Enriquez, Denise Joaquin, Lalaine Lacson, Veronica Veron, Victoria Haynes, Jessie Diaz, Mark Angelo Wilson
45	"Sa Puso ng Dagat"	Johnny Manahan	1998
Cast: Eric Quizon, Stella Ruiz, Stefano Mori, Ronnie Lazaro, Andrea Del Rosario
46	"Celeste"	Ruel S. Bayani	1998
Cast: Jericho Rosales, Nikki Valdez, Gina Pareño, Dick Ysrael, Bon Vibar, Ronalisa Cheng, Denise Joaquin,
47	"Ali-pin"	Don Miguel Cuaresma	1998
Cast: Stefano Mori, Ching Arellano, Michael Roy Jornales, Janice de Belen
48	"Field Trip, Side Trip"	Nick Lizaso	1998
A story about Bobit who meets a mysterious young boy that turns out to be José Rizal. Cast: Stefano Mori, Ceejay Ramos, Winnie Cordero, John Arcilla, Michael Roy Jornales, Alfred Manal, Jefferson Long, Korinne Lirio, Susan Africa, Rio Locsin
49	"Starfighters"	Johnny Manahan	1998
Cast: J.R. Herrera, Aurora Halili, Don Laurel, Ana Capri, Minnie Aguilar, Jackie Castillejo, Lorena Garcia, Rex Agoncillo, Lourdes "Pupi" Pla
51	"Peyriteyls" (Note: The episode featured various fairy tales such as Hansel and Gretel, Cinderella, Rapunzel, Little Red Riding Hood, Sleeping Beauty, Snow White, and Aladdin.)	Johnny Manahan	1998
Cast: Camille Prats, Carlo Aquino, Angel Aquino, Allan Bautista, Bea Lopez, Allyson Lualhati, Kien Navarro, Kjell Villamarin, J.R. Garcia, KB de Jesus, Francis Michael Rivera, Gerome Espartinez, Sylvia Sanchez
52	"Slow Down... Angels Crossing"	Johnny Manahan	1998
Cast: Nikki Valdez, Jodi Santamaria, Patrick Garcia, Anna Marin, Lui Villaruz
53	"Musika ni Marissa"	Ruel S. Bayani	1998
Cast: Angelika Dela Cruz, Dianne dela Fuente, Malou de Guzman, Dick Israel, Errol Dionisio, Melanie Marquez
54	"Bessy Basura"	Johnny Manahan	1998
A story about an 8-year-old girl named Bessy who doesn't care about garbage and puts a mess anywhere she goes. When the fairy of all cleanliness saw this, she cursed Bessy and was chased by garbage everywhere she goes, giving her the ability to mimic its traits. In the end, the fairy undos her curse as she starts to care for the environment. Cast: Lourdes "Pupi" Pla, Eula Valdez, Ceejay Ramos, Korinne Lirio, Sunshine Cruz
55	"My Fairy Godmother"	Jerry Lopez Sineneng	1998
Cast: Mumay Santiago, Elizabeth Oropesa, Sylvia Sanchez, Spanky Manikan, Lora Luna, Kathleen Hermosa, Edlyn Tallada
56	"Ang Syota Kong Witchy Witchy"	Wenn V. Deramas	1998
Cast: Leandro Baldemor, Shintaro Valdez, Kris Aquino, Gina Pareño, Dexter Doria, Maureen Mauricio, Crispin Pineda, Ena Garcia, Jovee Long
57	"Adonis"	Johnny Manahan	1998
Cast: Dominic Ochoa, Izza Ignacio, Gloria Sevilla, Whitney Tyson, Leklek Moreno Edward, Bentong
58	"Ang Mahiwagang Halaman"	Jerry Lopez Sineneng	1998
Cast: Angelica Panganiban, Charity Sanoy, Christine Garcia, Archie Adamos, Gary Lim, Mel Kimura, Doods Peralejo, Daniel Reyes, Jaclyn Jose
59	"Gulung-Gulong Gulong"	Unknown	1998
Cast: Shaina Magdayao, Alwyn Uytingco, Johnny Delgado, Edgar Mortiz
60	"Ngipin ni Lolo"	TBD	1998
Cast: TBA
61	"Hanted Haws"	Johnny Manahan	1998
Cast: Tommy Abuel, Malou de Guzman, Ena Garcia, Via Veloso, Mark Vernal, Dimples Romana, Danny Pansalin, Elaine Quemuel
62	"Hala, Lagot Ka!"	Johnny Manahan	1998
Cast: Shaina Magdayao, Yayo Aguila, Emman Abeleda, Eugene Domingo, Maricel Laxa
63	"Nick and Jane"	Wenn V. Deramas	December 27, 1998
Cast: Roderick Paulate, Serena Dalrymple, Eula Valdez, Lee Robin Salazar, Dexter Doria, William Lorenzo, Ronalisa Cheng, Jiro Manio
64	"Music Box"	Ruel S. Bayani	January 4, 1999
Cast: Emman Abeleda, Mo Twister, Denise Joaquin, Richard Quan, Mon Confiado, Justin Cuyugan, Janice de Belen
65	"Prut-Wek-Isterin-Kepweng"	Ruel S. Bayani	January 11, 1999
Cast: Ceejay Ramos, Sharmaine Suarez, Allan Paule, Aljon Jimenez, Rex Agoncillo, Manilyn Reynes
66	"Flashing Gordon"	Johnny Manahan	1999
Cast: Stefano Mori, Carlo Aquino, John Prats, Isabel Rivas, Teresa Loyzaga, Tess Dumpit, Raffy Bonanza
67	"Eli Elyenita"	Ruel S. Bayani	1999
Cast: Kris Aquino, Matthew Mendoza, John Lapus, Joy Viado, Nicole Andersson, Romy Santos, Jovie Long
68	"Pamana Ni Lola Gare"	Johnny Manahan	1999
A story about a girl who inherits a magical hand mirror that when the encryptions are read, two identical versions of herself appear. Cast: Cherry Pie Picache, Rez Cortez, Lucita Soriano, Anita Linda, Claudine Barretto
69	"Heartland"	Ruel S. Bayani	1999
Cast: Stefano Mori, Gardo Versoza, Jean Garcia, Stella Ruiz, Carlos Morales, Michael Roy Jornales, Victoria Haynes, Jessie Diaz
70	"Abrakadabra"	Johnny Manahan	1999
Cast: Carlo Aquino, John Prats, Steven Alonzo, Jeffrey Santos, Ian Veneracion
71	"Angel Felice"	Ruel S. Bayani	1999
Cast: Pupi Pla, Perla Bautista, Roy Rodrigo, Alwyn Uytingco, Eva Ramos, Mosang, Princess Punzalan
72	"Sa Mata ng Bata"	Johnny Manahan	1999
A story about a mother who gave birth to two children that have telekinetic powers. Cast: Mumay Santiago, Lester Llansang, Vivian Foz, Racquel Montessa, Dante Castro, Rio Locsin
74	"Gateway to Heaven"	Wenn V. Deramas	1999
Cast: Karl Angelo Legaspi, Ena Garcia, Alwyn Uytingco, Nica Peralejo, Troy Martino, Jonel "Face" Sales, Cherry Pie Picache
75	"Madyik Sandok"	Gilbert Perez	1999
A story about a magical ladle. Cast: Yda Yaneza, Monina Bagatsing, Tracy Vergel, Eva Darren, Leandro Muñoz
76	"Kusinero Kuno"	John-D Lazatin	1999
Cast: Gabe Mercado, Yda Yaneza, Ryan Eigenmann, Emman Abeleda, William Martinez, Gladys Reyes, Lou Veloso, Ernie Zarate, Eugene Domingo, Joel Siervo, Jojo Saguin, Nini Matilac, Eric Agustin, Mark Angelo Wilson, Nicole Marie Gatchalian, Kaiser German Gonzales, Ruth Diaz
77	"Bukambibig"	Wenn V. Deramas	1999
Cast: Marianne dela Riva, Efren Reyes Jr., Michael Roy Jornales, Mely Tagasa, Ana Feliciano, Rey "Kilay" Francisco, Carding Castro, Jak Barrios
78	"Tikitikitak"	Wenn V. Deramas	1999
A story about a family who accidentally travel through time with a magical grandfather clock. Cast: Elizabeth Oropesa, Joel Torre, Ray Ventura, Nikki Valdez, Gerard Pizarras, Mark Vernal, Jodie Sta. Maria, Tita de Villa, Luz Fernandez, Pocholo Montes
79	"BestFrienDs"	Nick Lizaso	1999
Cast: Janus del Prado, Rodney Shattara, Katrina de Leon, Justin Simoy, Norman Hernandez, Forzad Centeno, Mymy Davao
80	"Super Si Nanay"	Wenn V. Deramas	1999
Cast: Glydel Mercado, Alicia Alonzo, Susan Africa, Eugene Domingo, Katrina Aguila, Bianca Aguila, Benjie Valdez, Gillette Sandico, Nina Desagun, Jaclyn Jose
81	"Madyik Pitsel"	John-D Lazatin	1999
A story about a girl who finds a magical pitcher after her village ran out of water. Cast: Alma Concepcion, John Arcilla, Malou de Guzman, Ernie Zarate, Gary Lim, Allyson Lualhati, Hazel Ann Mendoza
82	"Hello, God..."	John-D Lazatin	1999
A story about a father who didn't seem to notice that her daughter can see God. Cast: Michael de Mesa, Rustom Padilla, Beth Tamayo, Tina Paner, Vanessa del Bianco, Katrina Nazario, Bong Regala
83	"Madyik Kaldero"	Unknown	1999
A story about a magical cooking pot. Cast: Vhong Navarro, Carlo Aquino
84	"Ang Alamat Ko at ni Buboy"	Gilbert Perez	1999
Cast: Karl Angelo Legaspi, Kalvin Legaspi, Eula Valdez, Mandy Ochoa, Victoria Haynes, Chie Concepcion, Melanie Marquez
85	"Muy Ching Chua"	Gilbert Perez	1999
Cast: Muy Muy, Isabel Rivas, Lander Vera-Perez, CJ Ramos, Ronalisa Cheng, Toby Alejar, Rochelle Barrameda, Aurora Halili, Jefferson Long, Mel Feliciano
86	"Witch Hunt"	John-D Lazatin	1999
Cast: Amy Austria, Jennifer Mendoza, Kier Legaspi, Alwyn Uytingco, Mel Kimura, Albert John Tolipas, Lorena Garcia
87	"Komiks" (Note: The episode combines with live-action and animation, similar to the 1988 film Who Framed Roger Rabbit.)	Johnny Manahan	1999
A story about a boy who encounters his comic book characters come to life. Cast: Emman Abeleda, Melissa Mendez, Sherilyn Reyes-Tan, Lucita Soriano, Bong Regala
88	"Tugtog Sarado"	Wenn V. Deramas	1999
Cast: Juan Rodrigo, Rita Avila, Joy Viado, Chinkee Tan, Rex Agoncillo, Lester Llansang, April Boy Regino
89	"Tatay-Tatayan... Anghel-Anghelan"	Johnny Manahan	1999
Cast: Robin Padilla, Moreen Guese, Dindo Arroyo, Boyong Baytion, Aljon Tolipas, Benjie Valdes, John Wayne Sace, Blair Arellano, Sergio Garcia, Louise Santos
90	"Kuba-Kadabra"	Johnny Manahan	1999
Cast: Dominic Ochoa, Cynthia Patag, Romy Diaz, Nanette Inventor, Nica Peralejo, Janette McBride
91	"Last Wish"	Laurenti M. Dyogi	1999
Cast: Korinne Lirio, Michael Roy Jornales, KB de Jesus, Jovie Long, Shiela Marie Rodriguez, Robert Seña
92	"Manika"	Wenn V. Deramas	1999
A story about a rude girl who turns into a doll. Cast: Lorena Garcia, Lotlot de Leon, Ramon Christopher, Hazel Ann Mendoza, Suzette Ranillo, Laura James, Connie Chua
93	"Lady in Pink"	John-D Lazatin	1999
Cast: Shaina Magdayao, Carol Banawa, Marianne de la Riva, Alwyn Uytingco, Carlos Agassi, Eva Darren, Denise Joaquin, Don Laurel
94	"Kukuru-kuku"	Gilbert Perez	1999
A story about a man who turns into a rooster. Cast: Smokey Manaloto, Izza Ignacio, Farrah Florer, Ronalisa Cheng
95	"Yanni the Genie"	John-D Lazatin	1999
Cast: Diether Ocampo, Rachel Alejandro, Efren Reyes, Vivian Foz, Berting Labra, Victoria Haynes, Jiro Manio
96	"Library"	Ruel S. Bayani	1999
Cast: Manilyn Reynes, Nica Peralejo, John Prats, Bella Flores, Ester Chavez, Gerard Pizarras, Jeffrey Hidalgo, Sarah Christophers, Jennifer Illustre, John Wayne Sace
97	"Mahiwagang Lampara"	Wenn V. Deramas	1999
Cast: Rica Peralejo, Bojo Molina, Vangie Labalan, Monina Bagatsing, Miggy Tanchanco, Sirk Cortez, Christian Santino, Nida Blanca
98	"Magic TV"	TBD	1999
Cast: TBA
99	"No Teeth Si Matet"	Rory B. Quintos	1999
Cast: Camilla Villamil, Vivian Foz, Dominic Ochoa, Mat Ranillo, Lou Veloso, Nica Peralejo
100	"Mall Alone" (Note: The title is a play on the 1990 film Home Alone.)	Ruel S. Bayani	1999
Cast: Angelica Panganiban, Michael Roy Jornales, Miguel de la Rosa, Donnie Fernandez, Gandong Cervantes, Arman de Guzman, Carlo Aquino
101	"Cinderello"	John-D Lazatin	December 26, 1999
A story about a gender-swapped version of Cinderella. Cast: Vhong Navarro, Vanessa del Bianco, Ces Quesada, Gary Lim, Raquel Montessa, Bearwin Meily, Don Laurel, Wowie de Guzman
102	"Lazy Johnny Meets Juan Tamad"	Nick Lizaso	January 2, 2000
Cast: Paolo Contis, Susan Africa, Sandra Gomez, Alma Lerma, Leo Martinez
103	"Babe Damulag"	Wenn V. Deramas	January 9, 2000
Cast: Gladys Reyes, Sylvia Sanchez, Dino Guevarra, Maureen Larrazabal, Debraliz, Toby Alejar, Jessette Prospero, Gilleth Sandico
104	"Si San Miguel at Si Lucifer"	Johnny Manahan	2000
Cast: Jericho Rosales, Ching Arellano, Ronalisa Cheng, John Blair Arellano, Angelo Caangay, Irma Adlawan, Girlie Alcantara, Florante Tagulo
105	"Betty at Bestre"	John-D Lazatin	2000
Cast: Bobby Andrews, Rica Peralejo, Berting Labra, Carlo Muñoz, Princess Schuck, Mark Angelo Wilson
106	"Wishbone"	TBD	2000
Cast: Shaina Magdayao
107	"Perry the Little Miss Fairy"	TBD	2000
Cast: Lorena Garcia
108	"Happy Bear Day"	TBD	2000
Cast: Shaina Magdayao
109	"No Smoking... Please"	Gilbert Perez	2000
A story about a young kapre who punishes smokers with magic. Cast: Marick Dacanay, Joel Torre, Paolo Contis, Farzad Mashoufi, Ana Marin, Boy Roque, Rey Baquirin
110	"Ester Bani"	Unknown	April 23, 2000
A story about Ester who magically turns herself into a rabbit. Cast: Sylvia Sanchez, Empress Schuck
111	"Ano'ng Gusto Mong Maging?"	Wenn V. Deramas	2000
Cast: Yayo Aguila, Candy Pangilinan, Matthew Mendoza, Hazel Ann Mendoza, Alfred Labatos, Marick Dacanay, Monina Vergara, Jet Paz
112	"Andy-Patika, Supl-Anita, Mal-Ditas"	Wenn V. Deramas	2000
Cast: Ena Garcia, Farrah Florer, Rosana Jover, Ms. Celia Rodriguez
113	"Fountain Boy"	John-D Lazatin	2000
Cast: Roderick Paulate, Rita Avila, Vhong Navarro, Nikki Valdez, Alwyn Uytingco
114	"Mr. Dream Boy"	Wenn V. Deramas	2000
Cast: Ian Veneracion, Sharmaine Arnaiz, Wilma Doesnt, Malou de Guzman, Via Veloso
115	"Madyik Pinggan, Atbp"	Gilbert Perez	2000
A story about a magical nanny and her magical talking plate. Cast: Gladys Reyes, William Martinez, Lotlot de Leon, Alma Lerma, Emman Abeleda
116	"Ang Sireno"	Wenn V. Deramas	2000
Cast: Piolo Pascual, Jennifer Sevilla, Carlos Morales, Charlie Davao, Tom Olivar, Eugene Domingo, Roderick Lindayag, Angelo Caangay, Daniel Morial
117	"Popoy Power"	Rory B. Quintos	2000
A story about a boy who eats vegetables from an elderly neighbor that makes him more powerful. Cast: John Wayne Sace, Rita Avila, John Arcilla, Chris Daluz, Ronalisa Cheng, John Blair Arellano, Keno Agaro, Richard Candia
118	"Dance Family"	Erick C. Salud	2000
Cast: Tirso Cruz III, Carmi Martin, Paula Peralejo, Rodney Shattara, Miggy Tanchanco, Jessie Diaz, Arjay Legaspi
119	"Mandy Dekwat"	Rory B. Quintos	2000
Cast: Eula Valdez, Princess Punzalan, Marick Dacanay, Mel Kimura, John Wayne Sace, Elaine Quemuel, Emman Abeleda
120	"Payong Kaibigan"	Don Miguel Cuaresma	2000
Cast: Mark Bryan Homecillo, Ray Ventura, Alicia Alonzo, Hannah Camille Bustillos, Ching Arellano
121	"Tik Tak Tik-Takbo"	Wenn V. Deramas	2000
Cast: Amy Austria, Chat Silayan, Juan Rodrigo, Eugene Domingo, Princess Schuck, Patricia Ann Roque, Jiro Manio, Hazel Ann Mendoza
122	"Bata-Okey"	Wenn V. Deramas	2000
Cast: German Moreno, Cynthia Patag, Bless Lopez, Nanette Inventor, Keesha Fajardo, Malou de Guzman, Marick Dacanay, Beverly Salviejo, Gelyn Onate, Pinky Marquez, Genelyn Sumalinog, Cita Astals, Grace Toreja, Joji Isla, Kathleen Hermosa, Jojit Lorenzo, Tom Olivar
123	"Magic Shades"	Don Cuaresma	2000
Cast: Alwyn Uytingco, Glydel Mercado, Moreen Guese, Rocky Martinez, Ilonah Jean, Bong Regala, Sergio Garcia, John-John Porcadilla, Leonard Bryan Sinner
124	"Aso't Pusa"	Wenn V. Deramas	2000
Cast: Serena Dalrymple, Mark Anthony Fernandez, Farrah Florer, Joy Viado, Eugene Domingo, Mon Confiado, Troy Martino, Simon Ibarra, Leonardo Litton, Mark Bryan Homecillo, Jet Paz, Bless Lopez, Grace Toreja
125	"Ang Cross-Stitch ni Lola Amelia"	Don Cuaresma	2000
Cast: Rosa Rosal, Hannah Camille Bustillos, Armando Goyena, Rita Avila, John Arcilla, Mosang
126	"Shoe-mayaw, Shoe-munod"	Erick C. Salud	2000
Cast: Camille Prats, John Prats, Marianne dela Riva, Aurora Halili, Janus del Prado, Rodney Shattara, Melissa Avelino
127	"Matabil na Bilbil"	Bobet Vidanes	2000
Cast: Angela Velez, Bea Bueno, Melissa Mendez, Moreen Guese, Benjie Valdes, Edgar Mortiz, Daisy Mae Cariño, Wendy Villacorta, Filipina Pamintuan
128	"Wonder Jeepney"	Erick C. Salud	2000
A story about a struggling boy who wants to have a new life and family when he spots a man with his magical jeepney that can travel through alternate dimensions. Cast: Isko Moreno, Jessie Diaz, Janus del Prado, Susan Africa, Crispin Pineda, Mel Feliciano, Anna Feliciano, Rodney Shattara, Michael Roy Jornales
129	"Krismas Light"	Erick C. Salud	2000
Cast: Serena Dalrymple, Patricia Ann Roque, Alwyn Uytingco, Jessie Diaz, Rocky Martinez, Marita Zobel, Elaine Quemuel, Gina Pareño, Cesar Montano
130	"Wish Bag"	Wenn V. Deramas	December 24, 2000
Cast: Jiro Manio, Amy Austria, Bembol Roco, Malou de Guzman, Toby Alejar, Princess Schuck, Niña De Sagun, Nelson Evangelista, Kristine Mangle
131	"Matamis na Pramis"	Erick C. Salud	December 31, 2000
Cast: Emman Abeleda, Lotlot de Leon, Ramon Christopher, Ilonah Jean, Camilla Villamil, John Wayne Sace
132	"Tree Ko 'Yan"	John-D Lazatin	January 7, 2001
Cast: Marvin Agustin, Elizabeth Ramsey, Shaina Magdayao, Wilma Doesnt
133	"Insta-Lino"	Wenn V. Deramas	January 14, 2001
A story about a failing teenager named Lino who is struggling with everyday life when he gets struck by lightning, that causes him to become smarter than other. Cast: Carlo Muñoz, Vivian Foz, Dennis Roldan, Gary Lim, Migui Moreno, Tanya Garcia, Lanz Andrada, Nikki Valdez
134	"Tiquio, Tiquio in the Cue Ball"	Gilbert Perez	January 21, 2001
Cast: John Prats, Vhong Navarro, Lui Villaruz, Joy Viado, CJ Ramos, Jefferson Long
135	"Si Louie, Si Luisa"	Don Cuaresma	January 28, 2001
Cast: Sylvia Sanchez, Patricia Javier, Bong Regala, Kristopher Peralta, Kathleen Hermosa, Kaye Abad, Baron Geisler
136	"Famil-Ingay"	Erick C. Salud	2001
Cast: Cherry Pie Picache, Nonie Buencamino, Alessandra de Rossi, Rayver Cruz, Jhong Hilario, Ana Capri
137	"Mommy na Daddy"	John-D Lazatin	2001
Cast: Diether Ocampo, Sylvia La Torre, Debraliz, John Arcilla, Bernadette Allyson
141	"Kelly Babad"	Erick C. Salud	February 25, 2001
Cast: Mumay Santiago, Ray Ventura, Jean Garcia, William Martinez, Beverly Salviejo, Mon Confiado, Audrey Vizcarra, Luis Alandy, Corinne Lirio

==== Season 2 (2001–2004) ====
No. in season	Title	Original release date
142	"Alien... Alien... ang Naiba?"	March 4, 2001
A story about Trex, a young humanoid alien who finds himself on Earth. Cast: Jet Paz, Juan Rodrigo, Kristine Garcia, Jackie Castillejo, Dindo Arroyo, Winnie Cordero, Hannah Camille Bustillos, Janus del Prado
143	"Mayuming Gubat"	March 11, 2001
Cast: Jennifer Sevilla, Gabby Eigenmann, Emman Abeleda, Marick Dacanay, Menggie Cobarrubias, Ricky Rivero, Assunta de Rossi
144	"Flying Voters"	March 18, 2001
Cast: Dick Israel, John Arcilla, Ces Quesada, Maureen Mauricio, Ronalisa Cheng, Empress Schuck, Jinky Oda, Gandong Cervantes, Ariel "Hubes" Azarcon, Rad Dominguez, Elaine Quemuel, Dick Lindayag
145	"Ador Alaskador"	March 25, 2001
A story about a boy named Ador who teases people, but gets punished by a homeless person with magical powers. Cast: Mark Angelo Wilson, Ching Arellano, Whitney Tyson, Mymy Davao
146	"Pedro's Angels" (Note: The story shares similarities with the action comedy franchise Charlie's Angels, on which its title is based.)	April 1, 2001
Cast: Sharmaine Suarez, Regine Tolentino, Giselle Sanchez, Miguel Vera, Mel Kimura, Bong Regala, Moreen Guese
147	"Curly the Girl"	TBA
Cast: Marick Dacanay
148	"Star Fighters 2" (Note: The episode is a continuation of the first season's episode "Starfighters".)	April 8, 2001
Cast: Danilo Barrios, Desiree del Valle, Janette McBride, Carlos Morales, Lorena Garcia, Don Laurel, Aurora Halili
149	"Fifi & Fritzie"	April 15, 2001
Cast: Jhoana Marie Tan, John Lapus, Perla Bautista, Julia Clarete, Shiela Mae Junsay, Meriam El Asmar, Marga Yabao, Katrina Crisostomo, Meryll Lugares
150	"Wansapan-A-Nanay"	April 22, 2001
Cast: Mark Bryan Homecillo, Cherry Pie Picache, Shaina Magdayao, Odette Khan, Irma Adlawan, Jhoana Marie Tan
151	"Iskul Brats"	April 29, 2001
Cast: Mo Twister, Yayo Aguila, Angelo Muñoz, Angelo Caangay
152	"Wansapan-A-Tatay"	May 6, 2001
Cast: Ian Veneracion, Beverly Salviejo, Andrea Del Rosario, Athenea Pla
153	"Buhok ni Vanessa"	May 13, 2001
Cast: Aiza Marquez, Juan Rodrigo, Maria Isabel Lopez, Tootsie Guevarra, Jackie Castillejo, Enid Reyes, Lloyd Zaragoza, Pascal Greco
154	"Sine-World"	May 20, 2001
Cast: Janus del Prado, Gerard Pizarras, Simon Ibarra, Berting Labra, Ernie Zarate, Tessie Villarama, Michael Roy Jornales, Angeline Aguilar, Patricia Ismael
156	"Mumuy"	May 27, 2001
Cast: Melisse "Mumay" Santiago, Emilio Garcia, Glenda Garcia, Allan Paule, Ilonah Jean, Errol Dionisio, Emman Abeleda
157	"Genie in the Can"	June 3, 2001
Cast: Dominic Ochoa, Alwyn Uytingco, Korinne Lirio, Princess Schuck, John Blair Arellano, Mymy Davao, Mike Lloren, Gary Lim
158	"Mannequin-dat"	June 10, 2001
Cast: Camille Prats, Chin-Chin Gutierrez, Bella Flores, Susan Africa, Emman Abeleda
159	"Grand Ma at Pa!"	June 17, 2001
Cast: Gina Pareño, Vic Vargas, Leandro Muñoz, Dianne dela Fuente, Maila Gumila, Bong Regala, Sarah Christophers, Rocky Martinez
160	"Lupita Calupitan"	June 24, 2001
Cast: Tetchie Agbayani, Gary Lim, Bentong, Ronalisa Cheng, Gilette Sandico, Kristine Mangle, John Wayne Sace
161	"Ang Sapatos ni Cinderella"	July 1, 2001
Cast: Kristine Hermosa, Pinky de Leon, Julia Clarete, Luis Alandy, Len Ag-Santos, Joana Tan, Nicole Bates, Angeli Gonzales
162	"Ang Pulang Lobo"	July 8, 2001
Cast: Vhong Navarro, Jiro Manio, Chat Silayan, Minnie Aguilar, Jessie Diaz, Moreen Guese, Julio Pacheco, Athenea Pla, Mico Aytona
163	"Cleocatra"	July 15, 2001
Cast: Dimples Romana, Espie the Cat, Justin Cuyugan, Ricky Rivero, Kathleen Hermosa, Cherry Lou, Toby Alejar, Anne Villegas, Jennifer Illustre
164	"Huli Kaw" (Note: The story and characters share similarities to the Ghostbusters franchise.)	July 22, 2001
Cast: Lito Pimentel, Zoren Legaspi, Malou Crisologo, Joseph Roble, Anita Linda, Ching Arellano, Hyubs Azarcon, Benjie Felipe, Arvin Jimenez
165	"Magic Headband"	July 29, 2001
Cast: Gladys Reyes, Rio Locsin, Angel Aquino, Carlo Muñoz, Pam delos Santos, Ian Galliguez
166	"Mom & Pop Shop"	August 5, 2001
Cast: Shintaro Valdez, Lotlot de Leon, Aurora Halili, RJ Rosales, Nar Miranda, Elaine Quemuel, Maria Isabel Lopez, Alfred Lobatos, Katrina Nazario
167	"Itoy Story" (Note: The title is a play on the 1995 animated film Toy Story from Disney and Pixar.)	November 25, 2001
A story about a boy who encounters an alien which he named Itoy. Cast: Mark Bryan Homecillo, Glydel Mercado, Jake Roxas, Mario Bon, Roselito Lasala
168	"Isko White"	December 2, 2001
Cast: Onemig Bondoc, Efren Reyes, Empress Schuck, Julio Pacheco, Niña de Sagun, Cyrus Valdez, Angelo Caangay, Camilla Villamil, Yuuki Kadooka, Miggy Moreno, Snooky Sanchez
169	"Ang Bilin ng Bulignok"	December 9, 2001
Cast: John Prats, Georgina Sandico, Rodney Shattara, Angeline Aguilar, Joe Gruta, Irma Adlawan
170	"Buhawi"	December 16, 2001
Cast: Christian Vasquez, Lito Legaspi, Brando Legaspi, Jojit Lorenzo, Jessie Villarama, Dick Lindayag
171	"Nang Pasko ay Sumabit"	December 23, 2001
Cast: Johnny Delgado, Yayo Aguila, Allan Paule, Athenea Pla, Christian Jimenez
172	"My Angel Mal'Akh"	TBA
Cast: Alessandra de Rossi, John Prats
173	"Snow Black"	TBA
Cast: Elizabeth Ramsey, Isabel Granada
174	"Singsing Ni Ningning"	TBA
Cast: Camille Prats, Sarah Christophers
175	"Sampung Mga Daliri"	TBA
Cast: TBA
176	"Tse-Nelas at Tse-Patos"	TBA
Cast: TBA
177	"Haba Haba Hairdoo" (Note: The title is a play on the 1998 film Haba-Baba-Doo! Puti-Puti-Poo!.)	TBA
Cast: Dominic Ochoa, Julio Pacheco
178	"Puno ng Magic"	TBA
Cast: Gardo Versoza
179	"Ava Lavandera"	TBA
Cast: Jolina Magdangal
180	"Rico Puno"	TBA
Cast: TBA
181	"Billy Bilis"	TBA
Cast: TBA
182	"Simo Simangot"	TBA
Cast: Joseph Roble
183	"Andyan Pala... Ka"	TBA
Cast: Mara Lopez
184	"Kleng Klang Clay"	TBA
Cast: Susan Africa
185	"Rhodora Tsikadora"	TBA
Cast: Serena Dalrymple, Farrah Florer, Agatha Tapan
186	"Rubber Duckie"	TBA
Cast: Alwyn Uytingco
187	"Mutya at Maligno"	TBA
Cast: TBA
188	"The Fairy Godfather"	TBA
Cast: German Moreno
189	"Teacher's Enemy"	TBA
Cast: Lara Fabregas, Emman Abeleda
190	"Mighty Aid"	TBA
Cast: Bayani Agbayani
191	"Chim-Chimminy, Chim-Chimeroo"	TBA
Cast: Rica Peralejo
192	"Bunny Banidosa"	TBA
Cast: Angelika Dela Cruz
193	"FAT-ricia and FAT-ima"	December 30, 2001
A story about a morbidly obese woman named Patricia who uses a magical spoon to become slimmer. Cast: Mylene Dizon, Carlos Morales, Stella Ruiz, Ricky Rivero, Bea Bueno, Debraliz, Malou Crisologo, Eugene Domingo
194	"Mahiwagang Likido"	January 6, 2002
Cast: Camille Prats, Matet de Leon, Allyson Lualhati, Lloyd Zaragoza, Melissa Avelino, Timmy Cruz, Mandy Ochoa
195	"Sopas ni Paz"	January 20, 2002
Cast: Assunta de Rossi, Giselle Sanchez, Bentong, Luis Alandy, Lorli Villanueva, Lorena Garcia, Phillip Lazaro, Maoui David, Mar Garchitorena, Jessette Prospero, Marites Joaquin
196	"Ang Pilyo at Ang Pilya"	January 27, 2002
Cast: Amy Perez, Lito Pimentel, Sean Glenn Ignacio, Hannah Bustillos, Jaime Fabregas, Dexter Doria
197	"Starra"	February 3, 2002
A story about a female superhero named Starra. Cast: Claudine Barretto, Princess Punzalan, Jake Roxas, Dimples Romana, Jiro Manio, Andoy Ranay, Tiya Pusit, Boy Roque
198	"My Rain Dear"	2002
Cast: John Wayne Sace, Karla Estrada, Earl Ignacio, Valentin Simon, Dan Salamante, Ana Feliciano
199	"Si Paltok, Ang Kulatok, na Taga-tiktikatok"	February 10, 2002
Cast: Serena Dalrymple, Kristopher Peralta, Anna Marin, Debraliz, Angie Castrence, Joy Chiong, Ariel Azarcon, Arvin Jimenez, Gilleth Sandico, Daniel Morial
200	"Swapped!"	March 3, 2002
A story about a man and a woman who swapped bodies after an accident. Cast: Gladys Reyes, Leandro Muñoz, Farrah Florer, Lou Veloso, Kimberly Diaz, Justin Cuyugan
201	"Magic Hairbrush at Makeup"	TBA
Cast: Dexter Doria
202	"Thumb-gelina"	March 10, 2002
Cast: Heart Evangelista, Carmi Marin, Efren Reyes, Jon Achaval, Miko Samson
203	"CARA-jao"	March 17, 2002
Cast: Danilo Barrios, Pinky de Leon, Jiro Manio, Rio Locsin, Rez Cortez, Malou de Guzman, Errol Dionisio, Igi Boy Flores
204	"Fish Wish"	March 24, 2002
A story about a talking fish who switched bodies to a girl. Cast: Moreen Guese, Yayo Aguila, Beverly Salviejo, Bong Regala, Ching Arellano, Mara Isabella Yokohama, Empress Schuck, AJ Valdenibro, Marites Joaquin, Zia Marquez
205	"Lyko, Angel Ko!"	March 31, 2002
Cast: Camille Prats, Angeline Aguilar, Meg Reyes, Bea Alonzo, Adrian Albert, Lotlot de Leon, Lander Vera-Perez, Niña Mercado, Niña de Sagun, Alfred Labatos, Athenea Pla, Tara Ballesca, Angelo Gabriel Fernandez, Julio Pacheco, Sean Glenn Ignacio, Kristine Mangle
206	"Ming-ja"	May 12, 2002
Cast: Jolina Magdangal, Ramon Zamora, Michael Flores, Jiro Manio, Aurora Halili, Lui Villaruz, Trovador Ramos Jr.
207	"Rapunzel"	May 19, 2002
Cast: Carol Banawa, Cherie Gil, Carlo Muñoz, Nonie Buencamino, Shamaine Centenera, Pocholo Montes, Maritess Joaquin
208	"Dream Bag"	May 26, 2002
A story about a boy who finds a magical backpack from the school statue. Cast: Joseph Roble, Mark Bryan Homecillo, Katrina Nazario, John Arcilla, Karla Estrada, Joy Viado
209	"Suklay ni Lola Lilay"	July 7, 2002
Marie gets abused by her mean triplets Jane, Kelly and Lani and scolded by their father due to revenge and rivalry. Cast: Hazel Ann Mendoza, Armando Goyena, Eva Darren, Romy Mallari, Maoui David, Denise Laurel, Rachelle Garrucho
210	"Incredible Chuck" (Note: The story and the main character shares similarities to the Marvel Comics superhero Hulk and comic book series The Incredible Hulk, on which its title is based.)	July 14, 2002
A story about a boy named Chuck who turns into a buffed man whenever he gets angry. Cast: Carlos Agassi, Amy Austria, Lito Pimentel, Carl John Barrameda, Angelie Gonzales, John Wayne Sace, Jet Paz
211	"Pambihirang Bampira"	July 21, 2002
Cast: Carmina Villarroel, Zoren Legaspi, Eliza Pineda, Sean Glenn Ignacio, Debraliz, Mike Gayoso
212	"Kambing-Alone"	July 28, 2002
Cast: Danilo Barrios, Camille Prats, Ces Quesada, Jon Achaval, Richard Merk, Gigi Posadas, Hyubs Azarcon, Roderick Paulate, Randy Santiago, Amy Perez, Pia Guanio
213	"Si Pedrito't Si Putol"	August 4, 2002
Cast: John Wayne Sace, Ian Veneracion, Wilma Doesnt, Melissa Mendez, Bea Nicolas, Herbert Go
214	"CheerLola"	TBA
Cast: Eva Darren
215	"Zorotsky"	August 11, 2002
Cast: Randy Santiago, Bearwin Meily, Jaime Fabregas, Angelo Caangay, Karlyn Bayot, Alfred Lobatos, Marick Dacanay, Christian Galindo
216	"Coney Kuneho"	August 18, 2002
Cast: Ronalisa Cheng, Jaclyn Jose, Beth Tamayo, Earl Ignacio, Len Ag-Santos, Joseph Roble, Joy Chiong
217	"White Family"	August 25, 2002
It tells the story about a family who turns their skin to pure white during the night. Cast: Sandy Andolong, Rez Cortez, Angelica Panganiban, Julio Pacheco, Jinky Oda, Dennis Trillo, Nikki Laurel, Cyrus Valdez
218	"Angel-O"	September 1, 2002
Cast: Carlo Muñoz, Aiza Marquez, Desiree del Valle, Lui Villaruz
219	"Cora Burara"	September 8, 2002
Cast: Hannah Bustillos, Lorena Garcia, Nanette Inventor, Yayo Aguila, Emilio Garcia, Chie Concepcion
220	"Kakambal ni Niki"	TBA
Cast: Serena Dalrymple
221	"Yaya Fun-tasya" (Note: The eponymous character was likely based on the character Mary Poppins from the book series of the same name.)	September 15, 2002
A story about a magical and cheerful nanny who helps the children from danger. Cast: Manilyn Reynes, Joel Torre, Emman Abeleda, Princess Schuck, Carl John Barrameda, Aaron Concepcion
222	"My Fair Baby"	TBA
Cast: TBA
223	"Lagot Ka Cai!"	October 27, 2002
Meet Cacai, a cowardly girl who is always scared because of her mother's stories. She always comes late when one day, Cacai went late and meets a strange boy who has scary friends. Cast: Joy Chiong, Mark Bryan Homecillo, Meryll Soriano, Whitney Tyson, Jeffrey Tam, Allan Paule, Ilonah Jean
224	"Yucky Ms. Yummy"	November 3, 2002
Cast: Eugene Domingo, Shaina Magdayao, Melisse Santiago, Hazel Ann Mendoza, Regine Tolentino, Lara Fabregas, Andrea Del Rosario
225	"My Princess"	TBA
Cast: Camilla Villamil
226	"Dear Oso"	TBA
Cast: Nica Peralejo, Hannah Camille Bustillos
227	"Ang Damit ni Emmet"	November 10, 2002
Cast: Sean Ignacio, Lotlot de Leon, Carmi Martin, Evangeline Pascual, Nonie Buencamino, Angelo Caangay
228	"Shoes Ko Po!"	November 17, 2002
Cast: Bentong, Lito Pimentel, Jenny Miller, Alwyn Uytingco, Mon Confiado, John Blair Arellano
229	"Daddy's Girl"	November 24, 2002
Cast: Serena Dalrymple, Bembol Roco, Dennis Trillo, Tintin Arnaldo, Pinky Marquez, Jojit Lorenzo, Rayver Cruz
230	"Papel ni Abel"	December 1, 2002
Cast: Joseph Roble, Beth Tamayo, Lander Vera Perez, Christian Galindo, Rodjun Cruz
231	"Enchanted Trees"	December 8, 2002
Cast: Angel Aquino, Mylene Dizon, Moreen Guese, Franco Laurel, Carlo Muñoz, Julio Pacheco, Amy Perez, Jojo Saguin, Christian Vasquez, Rica Arambullo, Carol Banawa, Agot Isidro, John Lapus, Ayen Munji-Laurel, Andoy Ranay
232	"Si Sharron at Si Shannon"	TBA
Cast: Caridad Sanchez
233	"Sailor Monito"	December 15, 2002
Cast: Mumay Santiago
234	"Santa-panataym"	December 22, 2002
Cast: Jestoni Alarcon, Lorena Garcia, Sean Ignacio, Kristel Fulgar, Carl John Barrameda, John Manalo, Ethel Villaviray, Miles Ocampo, Gillette Sandico, Mike Lloren
235	"Treasure Aunt"	December 29, 2002
Cast: Robin Padilla, Michael Rivero, Michelle Bayle, Tia Pusit, Ces Quesada, Jacky Woo, Jiro Manio
236	"Huling Hiling"	2003
Cast: Angeli Gonzales, Ricky Davao, Princess Punzalan, Jamie Rivera, Zarah Balibat, Hermie Concepcion, Kathryn Bernardo, MM Borja, JV Garcia, Jasper Ferrer, Archibon Enriquez, Ana Lindayag, Tanya Alda, Gilleth Sandico, Neil Sese
237	"Lilit Bulilit"	January 5, 2003
A story about Lilit, a little boy who magically turns into an adult, from a mysterious lady. Cast: Carl John Barrameda, Dominic Ochoa, Malou de Guzman, Sammy Lagmay, Joseph Roble, Kimberly Diaz, Gary Lim, Luz Imperial, John Blair Arellano, Jessie Diaz
238	"Black & White Magic"	January 12, 2003
Cast: Danilo Barrios, Aiza Marquez, Lou Veloso, Irma Adlawan, Miko Palanca, Carlene Aguilar, Christopher Cruz, Nikki Laurel, Aaron Concepcion, Liberty Lometillo, Diane Tejada
239	"Dilim at Ilaw"	TBA
Cast: Lotlot de Leon, Irma Adlawan
240	"Myusik and Madyik"	January 19, 2003
Cast: Marick Dacanay, Vhong Navarro, Sharmaine Suarez, Isay Alvarez, Moreen Guese, Gandong Cervantes
241	"Mama, Me Mumu"	January 26, 2003
A story about two monsters trying to scare a little girl, only to fail themselves. Cast: Angeli Gonzales, Cherry Pie Picache, Bearwin Meily, Gabe Mercado, Dick Israel, Mike Lloven
242	"Pot of Gold"	February 2, 2003
A story about a group of people who meets a leprechaun with her pot full of gold. Cast: Jhoana Marie Tan, Julio Pacheco, Kier Legaspi, Dennis Trillo, Angeline Aguilar, Ama Quiambao, Adrian Albert, Aaron Concepcion
243	"Pipay at Pipoy Apoy"	March 9, 2003
Cast: Joseph Roble, Mark Bryan Homecillo, Camilla Villamil, Lotlot de Leon, Debraliz, Alfred Lobatos
244	"Stay, Cheese"	TBA
Cast: Bea Bueno
245	"Pamana ni Lolo"	March 16, 2003
Cast: John Prats, Marc Acueza, Ketchup Eusebio, Emilio Garcia, Bonggoy Manahan, Bing Davao, Mario Magallona, Cyrus Valdez
246	"Si Gorio'ng Guryon"	March 23, 2003
A story about Peping who meets a magical kite whom he named Gorio. Cast: Carl John Barrameda, Amy Austria, Mark Wilson
247	"Magic Beauty Box"	April 13, 2003
Cast: Bea Alonzo, Giselle Sanchez, Justin Cuyugan, Patricia Ismael, Wilma Doesnt, Jenny Miller, Tiya Pusit, Alfred Lobatos, Alfred Vargas, Tess Antonio, Kakai Bautista
248	"Happy Lola Ester"	April 20, 2003
Cast: Gina Pareño, Jiro Manio, John Arcilla, Gigette Reyes, Niña de Sagun, Neil Ryan Sese, Angela Garcia
249	"Erpak" (Note: The title is spelled "Kapre" backwards.)	April 27, 2003
A story about Erpak, a kapre who is afraid of people. Cast: Carlos Agassi, Bonel Balingit, Tintin Arnaldo, Marianne dela Riva, Richard Merck, Joshua Dionisio, Gem Ramos, Paulo Maderal, Job Zamora
250	"Atlantis"	May 4, 2003
Cast: Onemig Bondoc, Krista Ranillo, Luis Alandy, Pen Medina, Mark Wilson, Igi Boy Flores, Stephanie Garlan
251	"Mega Mameng"	May 11, 2003
Cast: Eugene Domingo, Jestoni Alarcon, Jenny Miller, Princess Schuck, Michael Agassi, Cyrus Valdez, Joshua Dionisia, Rosa Rosal
252	"Magic Mantel"	May 18, 2003
A story about a magical tablecloth that makes food magically appear. Cast: Marita Zobel, Nadia Montenegro, Patrick Dela Rosa, John Manalo, Angela Garcia, Daisy Cariño
253	"Mummy's Girl"	May 25, 2003
Cast: Jhoana Marie Tan, Rez Cortez, Efren Reyes, Pinky Amador, Lara Fabregas, Karel Marquez, Ketchup Eusebio, Hyubs Azarcon
254	"Basketpol"	June 1, 2003
Cast: Roderick Paulate, Carmi Martin, Mark Bryan Homecillo, Brian Tan, Karla Estrada, Arnold Reyes, Crispin Pineda, Gem Ramos
255	"Dial a Wish"	June 8, 2003
A story about a struggling father of two who bought a magical cellphone from a pair of people and can get wishes that may cost him his life. Cast: Marvin Agustin, Melanie Marquez, Dagul, Moreen Guese, Joshua Dionisio, Mar Garchitorena
256	"Meow"	June 15, 2003
Cast: Sharmaine Suarez, Rayver Cruz, John Wayne Sace, John Blair Arellano, Mico Aytona, Sergio Garcia, Mhyco Aquino, Angeline Aguilar, Yda Yaneza, Pia Romero, Hermie Concepcion, Marnie Lapus, Kokoy Palma, Ana Lindayag, Chona Fernando, Tanya Alva, Jack Bueno
257	"Miracle Pig"	June 22, 2003
A story about a magical pig that releases gold. Cast: Angelu de Leon, Maricel Laxa, Luz Valdez, Marky Lopez, Allyson Lualhati, Carlene Aguilar, Lalaine Enriquez
258	"Gayuma"	June 29, 2003
Cast: Dimples Romana, Gladys Reyes, Christopher Rojas, Rafael Rosell, Flora Gasser, Liberty Lometillo, Sean Ignacio, Ethan Javier, Lance Castillo
259	"Bottomless Purse"	July 6, 2003
Cast: Miko Palanca, Carol Banawa, Desiree del Valle, Jinky Oda, Cris Daluz, Eduardo Luarca
260	"Lampaeng"	July 13, 2003
A story about Paeng who joins a boxing match with his magical boxing gloves that came from his deceased father. Will he go home with a trophy or will he go home bruised? Cast: Vhong Navarro, Onyok Velasco, Long Mejia, Efren Reyes, Marc Solis, Joseph Roble, Carl John Barrameda, Menggie Cobarrubias, Valerie Martinez
261	"Wake Up Little Rosie, Wake Up"	July 20, 2003
Cast: Angelica Panganiban, Carlo Aquino, Pinky Amador, Anna Larrucea, Minnie Aguilar, Denise Joaquin, Frances Ignacio, Tak Barrios
262–265	"Isa... Dalawa... Tatlo"	August 3, 2003
Three fruit-related stories in one: "Ang Alamat ng Pinya", "Ang Alamat ng Saging", and "Ang Alamat ng Mangga". Cast: Glydel Mercado, Jhoana Marie Tan, Jet Paz, Joshua Dionisio, Moreen Guese, Perla Bautista, Gigi Posadas, Jojit Lorenzo, Joy Chiong, Rayver Cruz, Eva Darren, Pocholo Montes, Niña de Sagun, Harlene Bautista, Sheila Marie Rodriguez, Christian Galindo, Kristel Fulgar
266	"Gagambling"	August 10, 2003
Cast: Carlos Morales, Janna Victoria, Spanky Manikan, Neil Ryan Sese
267	"Ang Tipaklong at ang mga Langgam" (Note: The story is loosely based on Aesop's fable "The Ant and the Grasshopper".)	August 17, 2003
A story about a girl named Bubbles who got shrunk and captured by ants, as punishment for killing the ants. Bubbles then helps a grasshopper who may want to help her. Cast: Jhoana Marie Tan, Celia Rodriguez, Spencer Reyes, Michael Flores, Marky Lopez, Athenea Pla
268	"Ok Ka Fairy Tay" (Note: The title is a play on the sitcom Okay Ka, Fairy Ko!.)	August 24, 2003
A story about a thieving father who turned out to be a relative of a family of fairies. Cast: Edgar Mortiz, Camille Prats, Marc Acueza, Francis Ricafort, Pinky Marquez, Jon Achaval, Camilla Villamil, Cyrus Valdez
269	"Dwendeng Bahay"	August 31, 2003
Cast: Hyubs Azarcon, Gary Lim, Gardo Versoza, Minnie Aguilar, Marissa Sanchez, William Lorenzo, Gigette Reyes, Pauleen Luna, Glaiza de Castro, Maoui David, Joshua Dionisio, John Manalo
270	"Raja Humaplos"	September 7, 2003
Cast: Carlo Maceda, Mark Bryan Homecillo, Moreen Guese, Alfred Lobatos, Joy Chiong, Romnick Sarmenta, Harlene Bautista, Ama Quiambao
271	"Baston ni Gaston"	September 14, 2003
A story about an elderly man named Gaston who has a magical cane, and can use to give powers to a trio of women. Cast: Berting Labra, Celia Rodriguez, Elizabeth Ramsey, Boots Anson-Roa
272	"Si Buko at si Pandan"	September 21, 2003
A story about four dwarves who punishes two lazy children. Cast: Dagul, Mahal, Mura, Mia Flor, Ina Raymundo, Katrina Nazario, Sean Ignacio
273	"Otto the Magic Auto"	September 28, 2003
A story about a magical automobile named Otto. Cast: William Martinez, Karel Marquez, Julio Pacheco, AJ Valdenibro, Bong Regala, Korinne Lirio, Isa Fabregas, Aleck Bovick
274	"Hansel and Gretel and Ethel"	October 5, 2003
Cast: Isabelle de Leon, Angelo Caangay, Eliza Pineda, Jennifer Sevilla, Mandy Ochoa, Carme Sanchez, Agot Isidro
275	"The Perfect Girl"	October 12, 2003
A story about Jojo who brought assistance from a female robot. Cast: Antoinette Taus, Jiro Manio, Desiree del Valle, Baron Geisler, Malou de Guzman, Gio Alvarez, Ryan James, Paolo Maderal, Ruth Alfarez
276	"Carancal: Ang Bayaning Isang Dangkal" (Note: Based on the children's storybook of the same name by Rene O. Villanueva.)	October 19, 2003
A story about an elf-sized boy who fought an enormous giant. Cast: Carlo Aquino, Juan Rodrigo, Melissa Mendez, Joseph Roble, Angelo Caangay, Athenea Pla, Boy Roque, Lance Castillo, Aaron Concepcion, Gigi Pirote, Linda Gonzales
277	"Ang Pinagdikit ni Luna Liit"	October 26, 2003
A story about Luna Liit who got fused together with his best friend. Cast: Joshua Dionisio, Julio Pacheco, Jane Oineza, Gardo Versoza, Sylvia Sanchez, Carmi Martin, Emilio Garcia, Lou Veloso
278	"The Little Piggy"	TBA
Cast: Empress Schuck
279	"Pira-Pirasong Puso"	TBA
Cast: Kristel Fulgar
280	"Kara Kulay"	TBA
Cast: Angeli Gonzales
281	"Pinki Pramis!"	TBA
Cast: Janice de Belen
282	"Magic Pencil"	TBA
A story about a boy who discovers a magical pencil that can make his wishes come true. Cast: TBA
283	"Lasenggo"	November 2, 2003
Cast: Joseph Roble, Dominic Ochoa, Smokey Manaloto, Giselle Sanchez, Lorenzo Mara, Moreen Guese, John Manalo, Kathryn Bernardo
284	"Bananaman"	November 9, 2003
A story about a banana vendor who turns into a superhero Bananaman, with his powers made from bananas. Cast: Long Mejia, Carlo Muñoz, Sherilyn Reyes-Tan, Joy Chiong
285	"Washing Time Machine"	November 16, 2003
A story about a washing machine with the ability to time travel. Cast: Nova Villa, Camille Prats, Freddie Webb, Miko Palanca, Ces Quesada, Maoui David, Ryan Agoncillo, Yayo Aguila, Empress Schuck
286	"Kalat sa Gubat"	November 23, 2003
Cast: Chubi del Rosario, Miko Sotto, CJ Ramos, Sarji Ruiz, Ching Arellano
287	"Ang Siopao na Ayaw sa Batang Matakaw" (Note: Based on the children's storybook of the same name by Amang Medina.)	November 23, 2003
A story about a talking siopao who doesn't like gluttonous children. Cast: Carl John Barrameda, Winnie Cordero, Errol Dionisio, Michael Punzalan, Idda Yaneza, Daisy Cariño, Celeste dela Cruz, Yvette Tagura, Kathyln Masilungan, Marvi Medina, JR Follero, Ronnie Abanio, Noel Urbano, Bernardo Malejana, Christian Alvear
288	"Bato ni Lola"	November 23, 2003
Cast: Matet de Leon, Luis Alandy, Pauleen Luna, Cholo Barretto, Eva Darren, Ricci Chan, Neil Ryan Sese
289	"Cool-it Cupid"	November 30, 2003
Cast: Kathryn Bernardo
290	"Fast Tsibog ni Lolo"	December 7, 2003
A story about three ghosts whom they got into an accident helps a struggling man working on his grandfather's restaurant. Cast: Helen Gamboa, Baron Geisler, Emilio Garcia, Debraliz, Chokoleit, Mark Bryan Homecillo, Neil Sese, Jojit Lorenzo, Marick Dacanay
291	"Three Kings"	December 21, 2003
Cast: Andrew E., Onyok Velasco, Vandolph Quizon, Julio Pacheco
292	"Sweet Dreams, Pleasant Dreams"	December 28, 2003
A story about brother and sister Kiko and Nina, and their two embodiments of dreams. Cast: John Manalo, Eula Valdez, Lotlot de Leon, Gardo Versoza, Mylene Dizon, Robin Da Roza, Kristel Fulgar, Dang Cruz
293	"Kotso, Biskotso"	January 4, 2004
Cast: Danilo Barrios, Spencer Reyes, Jodi Sta. Maria, Lui Villaruz, Hyubs Azarcon, Empoy Marquez
294	"Magic Paint Brush"	January 11, 2004
Omeng, a young teen who has a crush on Jennifer, his older brother's girlfriend. Omeng and his friend see Mang Johnny, their school janitor, magically create an opening into another location by painting the wall with a magical paintbrush. The two friends decide to "borrow" the brush, and uses it for their own adventures. But Omeng's mischief creates trouble for his brother, and Omeng realizes that he has to take responsibility for his actions. Cast: John Wayne Sace, Joel Torre, Glydel Mercado, John Arcilla, Carla Humphries, John Barretto, Felix Roco, Eunice Lagusad
295	"Ting 'n Tess"	January 18, 2004
A story about a pair of magical gloves and scissors. Cast: Assunta De Rossi, Katya Santos, Caridad Sanchez, Evangeline Pascual, Denise Joaquin, Eliza Pineda, Owen Bowen
296	"Ang Susi"	January 25, 2004
Cast: Marvin Agustin, Angelika Dela Cruz, Jhong Hilario, Dustin Reyes, Joshua Dionisio, AJ Valdenibro, Len-Ag Santos, Ching Arellano
297	"Love on the Hill"	February 1, 2004
Cast: Daria Ramirez, Michelle Bayle, Onemig Bondoc, Rayver Cruz, Anne Curtis, Baron Geisler, Katkat Nazario
298	"Wonder Misis"	February 8, 2004
Cast: Vina Morales, Aleck Bovick, Kiro Amirati, Omar Principe, Sultan Amore, Miguel Vera, Norman Mitchell, Bantay Pungay
299	"Si Julia Gulya sa Perya"	February 15, 2004
Cast: Jhoana Marie Tan, Bobby Andrews, Dominic Ochoa, Arlene Muhlach, Pen Medina, Ces Quesada, Lorena Garcia, Ronalisa Cheng, Issa Fabregas, Sarah Balibat
300	"Tatlong Prinsesa"	February 22, 2004
Cast: Gladys Reyes, Anna Larrucea, Cheska Garcia, TJ Trinidad, Maja Salvador, Alfred Lobatos, Cyrus Valdez, Igi Boy Flores, Jacob Dionisio, Owen Bowen, MJ Maranan, FJ Yap, Lance Castillo, Mike George
301	"Doble Nora"	February 29, 2004
Cast: Angelica Panganiban
302	"Cielo de Julia"	March 7, 2004
Cast: Moreen Guese, Lourdes Pla, Rosalina Cheng
303	"Diyaryo" (Note: Contains three parts: "D' Late Edwin", "Katakot si Catacutan", and "Lagot Kang Tatay Ka".)	March 14, 2004
A story about a paperboy who meets a man that has the ability to change newspaper articles into reality. Cast: Mico Aytona, Ian Veneracion, Cherry Pie Picache, Danilo Barrios, Aiza Marquez, Efren Reyes, Len Ag-Santos
304	"Pest Busters"	March 21, 2004
Cast: Dominic Ochoa, Jake Roxas, Andrea Del Rosario, Cris Daluz, Mark Wilson
305	"Stupid Love"	March 28, 2004
Cast: Jeffrey Quizon, Tuesday Vargas, Noel Trinidad, Boboy Garrovillo, Denise Joaquin, Moreen Guese, Alfred Vargas
306	"The Adventures of Totong Tapang"	April 4, 2004
Cast: Sean Ignacio, Raymond Bagatsing, Maricar de Mesa, Carlos Morales, Pen Medina, Mon Confiado
307	"Asin at Paminta"	TBA
Cast: Jiro Manio, Mark Bryan Homecillo
308	"My Dolling Daughter"	April 11, 2004
Cast: Gina Pareño, Gardo Versoza, Marjorie Barretto, Athenea Pla, Jane Oineza
309	"Ang Hardin ng mga Wenekleks"	April 18, 2004
Cast: Caridad Sanchez, Nina Ricci Alagao, Hazel Ann Mendoza, Pia Romero, Carla Humphries, Jhoana Marie Tan, Igi Boy Flores
310	"Age Defying Fiona"	May 2, 2004
A story about a disobedient young woman named Fiona who is turned into an old woman by a mysterious fairy (Jill Yulo). Cast: Desiree del Valle, Lisa Lorena, Anna Larrucea, Perla Bautista, Jill Yulo, Brian Tan, Anita Linda
311	"The Missing Mommy"	May 9, 2004
Cast: Zsa Zsa Padilla, Mikel Campos, Vanna Garcia, Adrian Albert, Michael Alfonso, John Manalo
312	"Witch Kids"	May 16, 2004
Cast: Angelica Panganiban, Chubi del Rosario, Sarah Christophers, Chase Tinio, Marc Acueza, Gold Castro
313	"Askal at Pusakal"	May 23, 2004
Cast: Mylene Dizon, Luis Alandy, Rez Cortez, Pinky Marquez
314	"Emo Inggitero"	May 30, 2004
A story about a mischievous elf named Dondee. Cast: Danilo Barrios, Paula Peralejo, Aiza Marquez, Kristine and Katrina "JaBoom" Gonzales, Bryan Tan
315	"Dondee, da Duwende"	June 6, 2004
Cast: Mura, Abby Arazo, Dennis Padilla, Marjorie Barretto, Marc Logan, Jhoana Marie Tan
316	"Fina Finina"	June 13, 2004
Cast: Meryll Soriano, Gabby Eigenmann, Desiree del Valle, Kathleen Hermosa
317	"Ang Titser Kong Moomoo"	June 20, 2004
Cast: Jolo Revilla, Andrew E., Yayo Aguila, Hazel Ann Mendoza, Miguel Vera, Janus del Prado, Mel Kimura
318	"Angge Kayumanggi"	June 27, 2004
Cast: Dimples Romana, Onemig Bondoc, John Lapus, Angelica Jones, Camille Roxas, Sarji Ruiz, Sarita Pérez de Tagle
319	"Wansa-Tuli-Taym"	July 4, 2004
Cast: Mark Bryan Homecillo, April Boy Regino, Rita Avila, Emilio Garcia, Tiya Pusit, Igi Boy Flores
320	"Sayaw, Nanay, Sayaw"	July 11, 2004
Cast: Kathryn Bernardo, Manilyn Reynes, Mahal, Dagul, Regine Tolentino, Julia Clarete, Kristel Fulgar
321	"Bata Bata Masiba"	July 18, 2004
Cast: John Manalo, Nadia Montenegro, Arlene Muhlach, Moreen Guese, Joshua Dionisio, Kookoo Gonzales, FJ Yap
322	"Wally Wolf"	July 25, 2004
A story about Wally who turns into a werewolf. Cast: Julio Pacheco, Maricar de Mesa, TJ Trinidad, Jenny Hernandez, Paquito Diaz, Berting Labra, Lui Manansala
323	"Mic ni Monique"	August 1, 2004
Cast: Kaye Abad, Jessa Zaragoza, Rafael Rosell, Julia Clarete
324	"Magic Soap"	August 8, 2004
Cast: Hazel Ann Mendoza, Desiree del Valle, Marc Acueza, Jennifer Lee, Toni Rose Gayda, Katrina "JaBoom" Gonzales, Melissa Ricks, Hazel Cabrera, Katrina Gonzales
325	"Batang Ahas"	August 15, 2004
Cast: Maui Taylor, James Blanco, Marky Lopez, Joe Gruta, Jackie Castillejo
326	"Esep-Bata"	August 22, 2004
Cast: Roderick Paulate, Amy Perez, Gladys Reyes, Moreen Guese, Jiro Manio, Kiray Celis
327	"Home Sweet Home"	August 29, 2004 (pre-reformat special)
Cast: Nash Aguas, Dennis Padilla, Amy Perez, Gardo Versoza, Cherry Pie Picache, Sylvia Sanchez, Allan Paule, Roxanne Guinoo, Jacob Dionisio, Gabb Drilon, Jill Yulo, Thammie Andrada

==== Season 3 (2004–2005) ====
A new theme song was released during that season as sung by Nyoy Volante (also used in the revival series). Most of the episodes in this season also feature Nash Aguas and Sharlene San Pedro before the actual story and before the ending credits.

No. in season	Title	Original release date
328	"Dino, Di na Baby"	September 5, 2004
A story about young boy Dino who mysteriously grown into a young adult. Cast: LJ Moreno, Dominic Ochoa, Polo Ravales, Justin Cuyugan, Aaron Junatas, Yolly Ang, Grace Pirote, Jennifer Belen, Adrian Adriano, Christian Velarde
329	"Ang Kwento ni Lolo"	September 12, 2004
A story about the adventures of a grandfather. Cast: Dante Rivero, Juliana Palermo, Miko Palanca, Nonie Buencamino, Gilleth Sandico, Tanya Scaife
330	"Magic Eyeglasses"	September 19, 2004
Cast: Julio Pacheco, Lito Pimentel, Nadia Montenegro, Jhoana Marie Tan
331	"Palengke Princess"	September 26, 2004
Cast: Vanna Garcia, Chanda Romero, Dick Israel, Angelica Jones, Denise Joaquin, Paolo Paraiso, Kitkat, Jaya Brown
332	"3-in-1"	October 3, 2004
Cast: Jodi Sta. Maria, Hazel Ann Mendoza, Allyzon Lualhati, Marinel Santos, Sarah Christophers, Sid Lucero, Jill Yulo, Sarita Pérez de Tagle
336	"Road Trip"	October 31, 2004
A story about a family who finds themselves caught up in a mysterious sequence of events while on a road trip. Cast: Dominic Ochoa, Dimples Romana, Luz Fernandez, Owen Bowen, Mon Confiado
337	"Dragonesa"	November 7, 2004
Cast: Camille Prats, AJ Eigenmann, Kristine "JaBoom" Gonzales, Marco Alcaraz, Rochelle Barrameda, Lorenzo Mara, Pia Wurtzbach, Nikki Laurel, Helga Krapf
338	"Witches"	November 14, 2004
Cast: Marc Acueza, Mylene Dizon, Angel Aquino, Emilio Garcia
339	"Bottled Genie"	November 21, 2004
Cast: Angelika Dela Cruz, Miko Palanca, Jaime Fabregas, Justin Cuyugan, Marky Lopez, Gem Ramos
340	"Manekeno"	November 28, 2004
Cast: Onemig Bondoc, Iya Villania, Georgia Ortega, Angelene Aguilar
341	"Palakokak"	December 5, 2004
Cast: Jodi Sta. Maria, AJ Eigenmann, Danilo Barrios, Jaime Fabregas, Aiza Marquez
342	"Ang Wish ko ay Sumapit"	December 12, 2004
Cast: John Prats, Carlo Aquino, Aiza Marquez, Rio Locsin, Pokwang, Marc Solis, Mikel Campos, Carla Humphries
343	"Santa Kulas"	December 19, 2004
Cast: Bayani Agbayani, Alwyn Uytingco, Malou de Guzman, Hazel Ann Mendoza, Julio Pacheco, AJ Dee, J.E. Sison, Marc Cortez, Noel Colet, Tommy Boy Sta. Maria, John Paul Lizardo
344	"Tatlong Lusis"	December 26, 2004
Cast: Shaina Magdayao, Sid Lucero, Olivia Daytia, Ya Chang, Vivian Foz, Basty Alcances
345	"My Beautiful Chinchinita"	January 2, 2005
Cast: Rachelle Ann Go, Aleck Bovick, Rafael Rosell, Vanna Garcia, Cherry Lou, Sarita Pérez de Tagle, Leo Rialp, Liberty Lometillo
346	"Clone-yari Lang" (Note: This is the last episode to feature Nash Aguas and Sharlene San Pedro before the actual story and before the ending credits.)	January 16, 2005
Cast: Camille Prats, Agot Isidro, Ahron Villena, Mat Ranillo III, Marc Acueza, Kitkat, Tanya Scaife, Lance Castillo
347	"Sayaw ni Kikay"	January 23, 2005
Cast: Sarah Geronimo, Desiree del Valle, Mark Bautista, Sajid Hufalar, Dido de la Paz
348–351	"D' Supers"	January 30, 2005
348–351	"D' Supers"	February 27, 2005
A four-part story about a group of superheroes fighting evil in their way. Cast: Rica Peralejo, Jackie Lou Blanco, Carlos Morales, Marco Alcaraz, John Paul Lizardo, Andrea Nicole Guck, Manny Distor, Meryll Soriano, Eugene Domingo, DJ Durano

=== Revival series (2010–2019) ===
==== Season 1 (2010–2011) ====
No. in season	Title	Creator	Original release date
1–2	"Inday Bote"	Pablo S. Gomez	September 11, 2010 (Part 1)
1–2	"Inday Bote"	Pablo S. Gomez	September 18, 2010 (Part 2)
Inday, a bottle vendor, discovers a magical bottle containing two imprisoned genies. The genies grant her improved appearance and intelligence, transforming her daily life. When her neighbors learn about the bottle's powers, they scheme to steal the genies for themselves. Cast: Melai Cantiveros, Amy Nobleza, Cathy Remperas, Johan Santos, Joy Viado, Chokoleit, Rayver Cruz, Jon Avila, Lilia Cuntapay
3–4	"Inday sa Balitaw"	Pablo S. Gomez	September 25, 2010 (Part 1)
3–4	"Inday sa Balitaw"	Pablo S. Gomez	October 2, 2010 (Part 2)
Inday lives with her evil stepmother and one day, she finds a wood fairy that helps her find her real mother.Inday lives with her cruel stepmother and later encounters a wood fairy who helps her search for her biological mother. Cast: Maja Salvador, Matteo Guidicelli, Lotlot de Leon, Pretty Trizsa, Mel Martinez, Minnie Aguliar, Lloyd Zaragoza, Timothy Chan
5–6	"Cara" (Note: Based on the novel.)	Elena M. Patron	October 9, 2010 (Part 1)
5–6	"Cara"	Elena M. Patron	October 16, 2010 (Part 2)
Cara is one of three heads of a three-headed woman, alongside her triplet sisters Kanan and Kaliwa. The triplets were raised by their father away from public attention, with two of them kept covered by cloth so that only one head would be seen whenever they interacted with other people. Cara later falls in love with a man who is unaware of her condition, leaving her torn about whether she should reveal the truth to him. Cast: Alessandra De Rossi, Jake Cuenca, Susan Africa, Bing Davao, Boom Labrusca, Gianna Cutler
7	"Nato De Coco"	Rod Santiago	October 23, 2010
After Oca dies, his family is told to pay for their land. His son, Nato, and daughter-in-law, Espie, face hardship, prompting Oca to ask God to let him return to earth to look after them. Granted this request, Oca comes back as a coconut and protects Nato from bullies and other malicious people threatening his family. Cast: Maliksi Morales, Dominic Ochoa, Dimples Romana, DJ Durano, Peewee O' Hara, Joseph Andre Garcia, Basty Alcances
8	"Kokak"	Ruben Marcelino	October 30, 2010
Kara is placed under a spell that causes her to transform into a frog whenever she bleeds. The curse was cast by a fairy who wished to marry her father but was refused. Kara later falls in love with a photographer, although she is unable to remain in the city with him. Cast: Cristine Reyes, Luis Manzano, Gee-Ann Abrahan, Helga Krapf
9	"Kakambal Ko'y Manika"	Nerissa Cabral	November 6, 2010
Leny and Lena are twin sisters with contrasting personalities. Leny is portrayed as polite and kind, while Lena is depicted as mean and selfish. Lena blames Leny for their father's death, believing he died while saving her from an oncoming truck. One day, Leny falls from a wagon and dies, prompting Lena to feel guilty and believe she caused her sister's death. She begins to pretend to be Leny, but Leny's spirit is said to inhabit her doll and later haunt Lena. Cast: Jessy Mendiola, AJ Perez, Bing Loyzaga, Andre Tiangco, Rubi Rubi, Abby Bautista
10	"Valentina" (Note: The episode is based on the Filipino supervillainess Valentina but in this version, she is portrayed as a cursed individual but with a good heart and her love interest falls in love with her despite her appearance.)	Zoila	November 13, 2010
Valentina is born with snakes for hair as a result of a curse from a mysterious woman, who foretells that she will gain the power to turn people into stone upon reaching the age of 17. On her seventeenth birthday, Valentina accidentally petrifies her mother, prompting her enraged father to cast her out of their home. She then sets out on a journey to search for the woman who placed the curse on her. Cast: Melissa Ricks, Alex Castro, Gardo Versoza, Yayo Aguila, Glenda Garcia, Malou Crisologo
11	"Bandanang Itim"	Rod Santiago	November 20, 2010
Venus is initially considered unattractive, but she becomes beautiful when wearing a magical black scarf. A young man named Aris falls in love with her because of her appearance. However, Venus grows arrogant and self-centered, which eventually causes the scarf to lose its magic. Cast: Erich Gonzales, Xian Lim, Franco Daza, Tippy Dos Santos, Rita Avila, Allyson Lualhati, Jiro Shirakawa
12	"Ali Badbad en da Madyik Banig"	R.R. Marcelino	November 27, 2010
Ali, a boy from a poor family who sells mats, falls in love with Fina, the daughter of Jabar. Jabar demands a dowry of half a million pesos for Ali to marry Fina. During this time, Ali discovers that one of his mats has gained the ability to fly. Cast: Enchong Dee, Empress Schuck, Jay-R Siaboc, Dennis Padilla
13	"Super Kikay and her Flying Pagong"	Pablo S. Gomez	December 4, 2010
Kikay is a young girl who aspires to do something extraordinary for others. Together with her younger brother, she rescues a sea turtle from her aunt, Elma. The turtle is revealed to be magical and grants her the ability to protect both humanity and marine life. Cast: Kim Chiu, Felix Roco, Elijah Magundayao, Jessa Zaragoza, Ronnie Lazaro, Jobelle Salvador
14	"Abaruray Abarinding"	Pablo S. Gomez	December 11, 2010
Abarinding and Mel are dwarfs who share a mutual affection. They live peacefully within their community until a construction project threatens their home. To stop it, Abarinding must transform into a human. However, the change is permanent, and she can no longer return to being a dwarf, forcing her to live as a human. Cast: Queenie Padilla, Ejay Falcon, Regine Angeles, Charles Christianson, Gary Lim, Toby Alejar
15	"Kwin"	Ollie Roble Samaniego	December 18, 2010
Kwin is a fairy born into the family of a woodcutter. She is considered unattractive, and a witch seeks to harm her. Kwin dreams of becoming beautiful but eventually learns that true beauty comes from within rather than outward appearance. Cast: Abby Bautista, Christian Vasquez, Maricar de Mesa, Joy Viado, Cheska Billiones, Ana Capri, Ruben Gonzaga
16	"Karina Kariton"	Nita Eden So	December 25, 2010
Karina is a young woman who dislikes Christmas, having grown up in a broken family and left in the care of a household maid. Meanwhile, Mrs. Claus seeks someone to assist in delivering gifts throughout the town in time for Christmas. She notices Karina giving money to street children and selects her for the task. During her assignment, Karina comes to understand the true meaning of Christmas. Cast: Toni Gonzaga, Malou Crisologo, Leo Rialp, Peewee 'O Hara, Neil Ryan Sese
17	"Family Tree"	Pablo S. Gomez	January 1, 2011
A girl encounters a dwarf who grants her a wish. She wishes for a tree that bears fruits filled with money. However, her greedy friend desires the fruits for herself. Cast: John Arcilla, Yayo Aguila, Rubi-Rubi, Jojit Lorenzo, Amy Nobleza
18	"Ulo"	Pablo S. Gomez	January 15, 2011
Pedring is a boy born with hydrocephalus. He later discovers that he possesses a unique ability capable of improving his family’s circumstances. He soon learns that his magical bracelet was given to him by extraterrestrials. Cast: Miguelito de Guzman, Vina Morales, Emilio Garcia
19–28	"Buhawi Jack"	Rod Santiago	January 22, 2011
19–28	"Buhawi Jack"	Rod Santiago	March 26, 2011
The story follows Jack, Vera, and Rex as they embark on adventures to solve puzzles from the past that will shape the future. Cast: Gerald Anderson, Jewel Mische, Rap Fernandez, Bugoy Cariño, Phillip Salvador, Joel Torre, Yayo Aguila, Tetchie Agbayani, Julio Diaz, Ricardo Cepeda, Andre Tiangco

==== Season 2 (2011) ====
No. in season	Title	Original release date
29	"Ina'y Ko Po"	April 2, 2011
Terry has been spoiled by her grandma but is disciplined by her mother, Linda. She has a fairy doll and she shares all her wishes with it. Terry wants to changer her mother and Linda wants to change her daughter. What happens when the fairy grants them both their wishes and switches their places? Cast: Glydel Mercado, Christian Vasquez, Kitkat, Kimberly Fulgar, Daria Ramirez
30	"Juan To Tree"	April 9, 2011
Ten-year-old Juan wants to have a basketball court in his garden. One day, he cuts a tree in his yard to make space for the court. When he wakes up the next day, his arms are looking like branches of a tree. Gradually, he turns into a real tree. Cast: Maliksi Morales, Phoebe Khae Arbotante, Smokey Manaloto
31	"Bully-lit"	April 16, 2011
The strongest bully in the neighborhood turns into a child. Cast: Zaijian Jaranilla, Basty Alcances, Izzy Canillo, Jason Francisco, Cathy Remperas, Carlos Morales
32	"Stickers"	April 30, 2011
Two siblings, named Kitkat and Ozzie, don't know about the concept of sharing and are always fighting so they use magical stickers to mark their belongings. Cast: Abby Bautista, Miguelito de Guzman, Jessa Zaragoza, Dennis Padilla
33	"Vanishing Vanessa"	May 7, 2011
Vanessa is a girl who doesn't want to obey her mother. Later, she finds a magical mirror that can turn herself invisible. Cast: Jaclyn Jose, Cheska Billiones, Joy Viado, Christine Marquez
34	"Chokulit"	May 14, 2011
Two siblings are always fighting over chocolate. One day, they find a magical chocolate with a genie named Choco, and the younger sibling wishes for lots of chocolate but the older sibling wishes for the younger one to turn into chocolate. Cast: Agot Isidro, Janus del Prado, Aaron Junatas
35	"Flores De Mayumi"	May 21, 2011
Mayumi wants to be beautiful and not be teased by people around her. She uses a magical ointment on her face and turns into another girl named Mylene. Cast: Jessy Mendiola, Kiray Celis, Joseph Marco, Isay Alvarez, Kristel Moreno, Jane Oineza, Eliza Pineda, Angeli Gonzales, Bea Nicolas
36	"Swap"	May 28, 2011
Rayne wasn't able to catch up with the latest trends of toys and gadgets and he blames it all on his baby brother. One day, a magical clown named Swap offers him the power to swap new toys, but for a price. Cast: Jairus Aquino, Matt Evans, Glenda Garcia, Matthew Mendoza, JV Briones
37	"My Mumu"	June 4, 2011
Luis meets a ghost named Javier and together, they decide to find a way to send Javier to heaven. Cast: Bugoy Cariño, Philip Nolasco, Allan Paule, Angel Jacob, Chinggoy Alonzo, Raquel Monteza, Beverly Salviejo, Ruben Gonzaga
38	"Aurora's Oras"	June 11, 2011
Aurora is always late in submitting her homework, until she finds a magical watch that can freeze time and change her life. Cast: Angel Sy, Tetchie Agbayani, Ricardo Cepeda, Kristoff Meneses, Miles Ocampo, Nikki Bagaporo
39	"Three-in-One"	June 18, 2011
Trina, a young woman from the province seeking acceptance by her new classmates, learns a lesson in being yourself when receives a magical stone that allows her to create two clones of herself that embodying what kind of person she is trying to make herself into. Cast: Julia Montes, Hopia Legaspi, Robi Domingo, Van Roxas, Eda Nolan, Malou Crisologo
40	"A Boy's Bestfriend"	June 25, 2011
Billy is a selfish kid who doesn't have many friends. His dad gifts him a dog named Pluto but he is cruel to him as well. Pluto's magical collar and Billy's magical bracelet causes their body to swap, swapping Billy and Pluto's body. Cast: Basty Alcances, Carlos Agassi, Daisy Reyes, Archie Alemania
41	"Joy's Toys"	July 2, 2011
Joy is a lonely child who finds companionship in her toys. Her big brother decides to throw them away, but the toys come to life and ask Joy for help. Cast: Mutya Orquia, Nash Aguas, Makisig Morales, Khaycee Aboloc, Gloria Sevilla
42	"Apir Disapir"	July 9, 2011
It revolves around the life of Jenny, a girl who comes from a poor family of magicians. As a teenager, she wants to become popular and participates in a talent contest. Her parents don't want her to use her "special" skills to win but Jenny will do anything to gain popularity. Cast: Kathryn Bernardo, Renz Fernandez, Kristel Fulgar, Lito Pimentel, Maricar de Mesa, Perla Bautista
43	"Cacai Kikay"	July 16, 2011
A girl named Cacai wants to grow up as soon as possible and become a lady. She experiments with herbal medicines and mixes them in her drink. She wakes up to be a fine lady and starts doing things that adults do. But soon, she will realize that growing up is not as fancy as it seems. Cast: Bianca Manalo, Mika dela Cruz, Mariel Pamintuan, Francine Prieto, Bryan Termulo
44	"Sabay-Sabay Pasaway"	July 23, 2011
Hannah is always busy with her gadgets and uses them all at the same time. She forgets to eat her food or even change her clothes. She is taught a lesson with the help of a magic pendant that gives its user the ability to have additional body parts. Cast: Malou de Guzman, Bobby Andrews, Sharlene San Pedro, Dimples Romana
45	"Dirty Larry" (Note: The title is a play on the action film series Dirty Harry.)	July 30, 2011
A boy named Larry hates bathing. One day, germs on his skin come to life and attack their parents. Larry must understand the importance of hygiene and save his family. Cast: Zaijian Jaranilla, Precious Lara Quigaman, Eric Fructuoso
46	"Ang Bagong Car ni Carl"	August 6, 2011
Carl buys his dream car and takes care of it as if it's human. One day, Carl's little brother Julian trips over the wire and disconnects some of its parts. After fixing it, the car starts talking to Carl and calls itself Karen. Karen has a crush on him and when his girlfriend sits inside, the car electrocutes her. Cast: Ejay Falcon, Charee Pineda, Fred Payawan, John Arcilla, Jobelle Salvador
47	"Batang Chalk"	August 13, 2011
Fordie has no friends as he and his family had to leave Manila due to his Lolo's sickness. One day, he comes across a door and finds a talking chalk drawing of a boy. At first, he is scared but in a few days, he and the chalk drawing become friends. It was revealed that the chalk drawing is of Enyong, the young version of his grandfather. Cast: Bugoy Cariño, Jacob Dionisio, Dante Rivero, Rochelle Barrameda, Arnold Reyes
48	"Wan Tru Lab"	August 20, 2011
Wanda secretly loves her childhood friend Truman who has a girlfriend named Kimberly. She later dumps him when she sees Truman flirting with another girl. Kimberly seeks help from a spell-caster to take revenge against Truman. Cast: Jason Francisco, Melai Cantiveros, Niña Dolino, Arlene Muhlach, Perla Bautista, Bekimon
49	"Mga Alipin ng Lumang Aklatan"	August 27, 2011
Miko is an irresponsible boy when it comes to returning borrowed things. One day, he, along with best friend, Gwen, go to the school library and borrows a book. The librarian is a witch named Lucresia. Miko uses Gwen's card as he has lost his. A few days later, Gwen goes missing and so do all the children who haven't returned the library books. Cast: Jairus Aquino, Angel Sy, Tetchie Agbayani, Kitkat
50	"Ningning Kuting"	September 3, 2011
Ningning, a model, likes her new neighbor Roy, a veterinarian. To impress him, she adopts a cat named Jacqueline. But she is allergic to cats and hates animals. She mistreats the cat that turns out to be magical and turns Ningning into a cat to teach her a lesson. Cast: Mariel Rodriguez, Rafael Rosell, Daria Ramirez
51	"Wallet"	September 10, 2011
Vincent is a boy who thinks one can buy anything with money, even love and friendship. He gets everything he wishes for — cash, game cards, concert tickets, and movie passes — by using a magical wallet he has found. Cast: Albie Casiño, Miles Ocampo, Mikylla Ramirez, Barbie Sabino, Lou Veloso, Kimberly Rose Diaz, Cris Villanueva
52	"John Tamad"	September 17, 2011
It tells the story of a boy named John who is always in the internet café playing computer games instead of going home to eat. He is always reminded by his parents to come home. A tragedy strikes when one stormy night, a lightning strike the internet cafe, making John acquire magical powers. He will discover that the things he do is wrong and he needs to change his attitude towards his family. Cast: Gerald Pesigan, Assunta de Rossi, Jeffrey Santos
53–54	"Darmo Adarna"	September 24, 2011 (Part 1)
53–54	"Darmo Adarna"	October 1, 2011 (Part 2)
A young boy named Dario grows up to become an obese guy. With the help of a magical rooster, he transforms into a super-powered hero Adarna. He uses his powers to fight the magical creatures in his town. Cast: Jake Cuenca, Yen Santos, Alex Castro, Yayo Aguila, Mickey Ferriols, Ronnie Lazaro, Allan Paule, Clarence Delgado, BrennaPeñaflor, Quintin Alianza
55	"Mac Ulit Ulit"	October 8, 2011
Mac is a girl who is lazy and spoiled. She is tricked by a witch named Mirror Ruka who traps her inside a mirror. Cast: Noemi Oineza, Paul Salas, Rubi-Rubi, Liza Soberano, William Lorenzo, Melissa Mendez, Carl Camo
56	"Cocoy Shokoy"	October 15, 2011
Cocoy (Paulo Avelino), a young man who is always used to winning. Cocoy is always on top of everything and everyone especially when it comes to love and his favorite sport, swimming. When a new guy arrives on campus threatening his reign and winning streak, Cocoy goes all-out against him even if it means abusing the magical necklace granted to him by a siyokoy. His plan backfires as his own magical necklace curses him and turns into a siyokoy. Cast: Paulo Avelino, Coleen Garcia, Jovic Susim, Janus del Prado, Cai Cortez, Amy Nobleza
57	"Si Marcelino, Ang Payong at Ang Ulan"	October 22, 2011
Marcelino is a boy who was cursed by the "Sultan ng Ulan" because he does not value the environment and its beauty. The curse makes rain pour endlessly on him, though holding an umbrella can temporarily stop it. Cast: Maliksi Morales, Nanding Josef, Nikki Bagaporo, John Arcilla, Susan Africa
58	"OMG! Oh My Ghost"	October 29, 2011
Homer encounters a ghost called Claire, along with his girlfriend Trina, when he releases her from a "spirit of the glass" ritual. Claire uses Homer to take revenge against her ex-boyfriend, who turns out to be Homer's father. Cast: Ejay Falcon, Empress Schuck, Precious Lara Quigaman, Matthew Mendoza, Bea Basa, Noel Colet, Tado Jimenez, Bryan Santos, Vangie Martelle
59	"My Gulay"	November 5, 2011
This episode will teach kids the value of eating healthy vegetables. Popoy, a weak and sickly kid who dislikes eating vegetables. How will magic and fantasy changes the lifestyle of Popoy? Cast: Jairus Aquino, Jaime Fabregas, Dimples Romana, Francis Magundayao, Kyle Balili
60	"Sinung-A-Ling-Dingdong"	November 12, 2011
Dingdong is a dishonest boy who lies to get everything he wants. A meteor struck in his hometown, causing Dingdong's skin to grow a face that prevent him from telling lies. Cast: Basty Alcances, Epi Quizon, Quintin Alianza, Daisy Reyes, Hyubs Azarcon
61	"Lobo Boy"	November 19, 2011
A childless couple wishes for a new child when they find Boboy, a boy made out of balloons. Supposedly a gift to his parents who weren't blessed to have a child, Boboy suffers from the taunts of society and his own father because of being different. Cast: Clarence Delgado, Smokey Manaloto, Ina Feleo, DJ Durano, Veyda Inoval
62	"Housemates ni Lola"	November 26, 2011
After her family lost all money, Grace starts complaining about their new lifestyle. She starts visiting the home of her elderly neighbor, Lola Casilda. Unbeknownst to her, Lola Casilda turns children into furniture. Cast: Rustica Carpio, Mika dela Cruz, Joseph Andre Garcia, Maurice Mabutas, Angelo Garcia, Alexa Ilacad, Diamond Delahenty, Allan Paule, Yayo Aguila
63	"Unli-Gift Box"	December 3, 2011
In this story, Star (Julia) has always held a grudge against Mylene (Gladys Reyes), who refused to lend her money when her mother was rushed to the hospital. When her mother died, Star decides to go back to her mother's former business partner. When she received a mysterious box that grants everything she wishes for, Star uses it for revenge. In the end, she will realize that vengeance is evil and that peace can only be achieved through forgiveness. Cast: Julia Montes, Kier Legaspi, Gladys Reyes, Ron Morales, Mickey Ferriols
64	"Christmas Caroline"	December 10, 2011
Caroline and her sister Ponsi are living with their evil relatives after their father, Dado, is falsely accused of stealing jewelry. A Christmas fairy hears Caroline's cry for help and grants her a wish. Cast: KC Concepcion, Isabel Rivas, Niña Dolino, Rey "PJ" Abellana, Lui Manansala, Kyline Alcantara, Guji Lorenzana
65	"Santa Maybe"	December 24, 2011
An amnesiac Santa Claus enters the life of Badong, a man who does not believe in Christmas. Cast: Jayson Gainza, Amy Nobleza, Rency Consigna, Jhiz Deocareza, Ricky Rivero, Arlene Muhlach, Andre Tiangco
66	"Happy Neo Year"	December 31, 2011
Janus, a lazy and reckless boy, meets a mysterious old man named Mang Neo, who turns out to be "Year 2011" personified. Cast: Nash Aguas, Chinggoy Alonzo, Yayo Aguila, Francis Magundayao, Brenna Peñaflor, Jojit Lorenzo, Emilio Garcia

==== Season 3 (2012) ====
No. in season	Title	Original release date
67	"Gising na, Omar!"	January 7, 2012
Omar, a cowardly boy, receives a magical device that allows him to see the future. Cast: Dale Baldillo, Cheska Billiones, CJ Navato, Valerie Concepcion, Richard Quan, Ina Feleo, Jordan Hong
68	"Hulog ng Langit"	January 14, 2012
Paulo is a grouchy and lonely man who chose to drown himself at work in order to forget his misfortunes. His guardian angel accidentally falls from the sky and decides to change his life. Cast: Jason Abalos, Denise Laurel, Boboy Garovillo
69	"Ilog"	January 21, 2012
Nanding is a man who received the wrath of a river fairy because of his lack of care for the environment. Cast: John Lapus, Mickey Ferriols, Carlos Dala, Ketchup Eusebio, Noemi Oineza
70	"Mini-Mimi"	January 28, 2012
Childhood sweethearts, Paul and Mimi, had promised each other that they will be together, no matter what. But 16 years later, Mimi breaks her promise because she has become taller than Paul. She is in for a shock when a playful elf shrinks her to elf size. Cast: John Prats, Bianca Manalo, Jojit Lorenzo, Perla Bautista, Abby Bautista, Hideo Muraoka, Dexie Daulat
71	"Water Willy" (Note: The title is a play on the water lily, a type of flowering plant.)	February 4, 2012
Willy is a boy who neglects the value of water as an important natural resource. A mysterious old woman decides to teach him a lesson and make him realize that water should be conserved. Cast: Zaijian Jaranilla, Lilia Cuntapay, Elaine Quemuel, Smokey Manaloto, Lotlot de Leon, Simon Ibarra, Denise Canlas
72	"Hair, There and Everywhere" (Note: The title is a play on the song "Here, There and Everywhere" by English rock band the Beatles.)	February 11, 2012
Maisa is a kind lady, but feels sad about her rough and frizzy hair. One day, she wakes up with long and shiny hair that changes her life forever, as she becomes insensitive and arrogant. Cast: Pokwang, Rafael Rosell, Paw Diaz, Susan Africa
73	"Somewhere Over The Bahaghari"	February 25, 2012
Three friends find three magical wishing stones at the end of a rainbow. Their friendship is put to test after they accidentally waste one wish. Cast: Ella Cruz, Francis Magundayao, Kristel Fulgar, Andrea del Rosario, Jacob Dionisio
74	"Maya Aksaya"	March 3, 2012
A little girl named Maya always wastes food. As she continues to take food for granted, a dwarf casts a spell on her that makes food go away from her as soon as she touches it. Cast: Mutya Orquia, Louise Abuel, Vina Morales, Arnold Reyes
75	"Witchy Mitch"	March 10, 2012
Mitch is a witch who uses her powers to help others. Her mother doesn't want her to use magic and wants her to have a normal life, but Mitch disobeyed her mother to use her magical powers for her own sake and seek vengeance. Cast: Toni Gonzaga, Guji Lorenzana, Niña Dolino, Atoy Co, Isay Alvarez, Angel Sy
76	"Hannah Panahon"	March 17, 2012
Hannah, a weather girl, was cursed by Sheila, her researcher, that the weather will change according to Hannah's mood. Cast: Toni Gonzaga, Bryan Termulo, Eda Nolan, Tess Antonio, Dexter Doria, Janine Berdin
77	"Amanda's Da Man"	March 24, 2012
Adam is a womanizer who dates girls and then dumps them. As a punishment, he is turned into a woman named Amanda by a fairy. Cast: Toni Gonzaga, Rayver Cruz, Jewel Mische, Helga Krapf, Auriette Divina, Veyda Inoval, Fred Payawan, Charles Christianson, Marina Benipayo
78	"IncrediBelle"	March 31, 2012
Belle is an adopted child and she longs for the love of her adoptive family. She accidentally gets superpowers and then starts demanding attention from everybody around her. Cast: Toni Gonzaga, Isabel Rivas, Kristel Moreno, Christopher Roxas, Bettina Carlos
79	"Maan Antukin"	April 14, 2012
Maan has a habit of sleeping late at night. As she continues to take sleep for granted, the sleeping fairies punish her and make her fall asleep randomly, whenever, wherever, and whatever she is doing. Cast: Xyriel Manabat, Angel Aquino, Karla Estrada, Martin del Rosario, Greggy Santos, Ricardo Cepeda
80	"Sandy and the Super Sandok"	April 21, 2012
Sandy is a loving daughter who helps her mother at their eating joint. After being blessed with a magical ladle that has the power to prepare delicious dishes, she becomes vengeful and starts using it against her competitors. Cast: Xyriel Manabat, Mutya Orquia, Precious Lara Quigaman, Lito Pimentel, Rubi-Rubi, Brenna Peñaflor, Hermie Concepcion, Jobert Austria
81	"Si Pam Pabaya at ang Mahiwagang Gold Fish"	April 28, 2012
A girl named Pam is always neglecting her pets as she longs for her overseas working mother. When she receives a magical goldfish that produces golden pellets, she overuses its ability, thinking that wealth will make her family whole again. Cast: Xyriel Manabat, Alfred Vargas, Valerie Concepcion, Wendy Valdez, Beverly Salviejo
82	"Doll House"	May 5, 2012
Grace believes her parents don’t love her because they cannot afford to buy her a dollhouse. Wishing for a life as perfect as a grand dollhouse, her wish comes true, and she begins to realise the true value of her family. Cast: Xyriel Manabat, Bobby Andrews, Ina Feleo, Yen Santos, Joseph Marco, Andrea Brillantes, Melai Cantiveros, Kitkat
83	"Hungry Birds" (Note: The title is a play on the Angry Birds video game series.)	May 12, 2012
Maya, a disobedient child, longs for the attention of her mother who has raised her single-handedly. Due to her bad behavior, a magical bird punishes her to become a human bird. Cast: Xyriel Manabat, Assunta de Rossi, Ana Capri, Raquel Montesa
84	"Lara Laro"	May 19, 2012
Lara is a disobedient child who loves playing all day. One day, she meets two playful dwarves, who are going to drain out all her energy. Cast: Xyriel Manabat, Daisy Reyes, Christian Vasquez, Jayson Gainza, Hyubs Azarcon
85	"Remote Emote"	May 26, 2012
Joy, a lazy child, is not excited about going to school because of her addiction to television. One night, she meets a TV salesman named Mr. Booboo who gives her a magical remote control that can fast forward time. Cast: Xyriel Manabat, Eric Fructuoso, Jessa Zaragoza, Thou Reyes, Marissa Sanchez, Sofia Millares
86	"Mai Palusot"	June 2, 2012
Mai-Mai, a playful child, always has excuses so that she can play with her friends. One day, she finds a magical bracelet that can turn all her excuses into reality. Cast: Xyriel Manabat, Angelu de Leon, Ian De Leon, Lloyd Zaragoza, Amy Nobleza, Kimberly Fulgar
87	"Ik-Ik da Madyik Biik"	June 9, 2012
Kate has a habit of saving her money and keeping it in a piggy bank. One day, the piggy bank comes to life and gives out a lot of money. Now Kate suddenly becomes arrogant and must bear the consequences. Cast: Xyriel Manabat, Jodi Sta. Maria, Vandolph Quizon, Cris Pasturan
88	"Ballpen de Sarah Pen" (Note: The title is a play on the Filipino children's folk song "Pen Pen de Sarapen".)	June 16, 2012
Sarah loves to cheat in her exams. She keeps getting good grades and one day, she comes across a magical pen that can answer questions on its own. Cast: Xyriel Manabat, Yogo Singh, Gladys Reyes, Christopher Roxas, Liza Lorena
89	"Magic Shoes"	June 23, 2012
Bechay's parents are financially unstable and she decides to help them by participating in a dancing competition. She has magical shoes that can help her, but she decides to win without using them. Cast: Xyriel Manabat, Wowie de Guzman, Ciara Sotto, Susan Africa, Brenna Peñaflor, Slater Young, Ogie Escanilla
90	"Beauty is the Beast" (Note: The title is a play on the 1740 French fairy tale Beauty and the Beast by Gabrielle-Suzanne Barbot de Villeneuve.)	June 30, 2012
Beauty and her mother are always saying bad things to the people who are poor and not good-looking. Beauty's yaya, Yaya Doray, decides to cast a spell on her to teach her a lesson. Cast: Xyriel Manabat, Dominic Ochoa, Andrea del Rosario, Beverly Salviejo, Arlene Tolibas, Abby Bautista, Marikit Morales, Hazel Nanom, Dexie Daulat
91	"Lai, Lai, Batang Pasaway!"	July 7, 2012
Laila is a disobedient girl who destroys signboards and does not like to follow the rules. There she finds a mysterious ghostly spirit named Yokai who asked for help for his release. After his release, Yokai starts to do mischievous things like switching salt and sugar, and mess up all the signboards around her. Cast: Xyriel Manabat, Irma Adlawan, Miles Ocampo, Malou Crisologo, Nicky Castro
92	"Pinay Big Sister" (Note: The title is a play on the reality competition television series Pinoy Big Brother.)	July 21, 2012
Pinay is not very fond of her youngest sister. She continues to be self-centered and one day, she finds a magical feather that can increase the size of things around her. Cast: Xyriel Manabat, Randy Santiago, Glenda Garcia, Mikylla Ramirez, Veronica Louise Bernardo, Veyda Inoval, Keanna Reeves
93	"Da Revengers" (Note: The title is a play on The Avengers.)	July 28, 2012
Terry and Isay are beauty pageant rivals. Terry is a good singer while Isay is good at dancing. Things take a drastic turn when a magical tiara grants them any wish they want, but they wish for nasty things that will make them lose: Terry's voice becomes a rodent voice and Isay's right foot turns into a left foot. Cast: Xyriel Manabat, Andrea Brillantes, Archie Alemania, Nikki Valdez, Katya Santos, Gerald Madrid, Sofia Millares
94	"The Fairy Garden"	August 4, 2012
Rose has no respect for nature. She keeps ruining all the plants and saplings that her mom plants. What she doesn't know is that there are magical pixies that look after the garden. Cast: Xyriel Manabat, Noel Trinidad, Giselle Sanchez, Michael Flores, Maricar de Mesa, Anika Gonzales, Elisse Joson
95	"Ang Suyod ni Ang Suh-yod"	August 11, 2012
Lisa, a girl with messy hair, lives with her grandma. She doesn't take care of her hair and one day, her grandma tells her the story of Ang Suy-yod, a warrior with a big magical fine comb that defeats lice. But the warrior is defeated by the queen of lice. Lisa doesn't believe her story and then things turn ugly. Cast: Xyriel Manabat, Pilita Corrales, Debraliz, Gary Chua, Janine Berdin, Jhiz Deocareza, Arnold Cruz
96	"Kuha Mo?"	August 18, 2012
Lucy, a materialistic girl, loves to buy things, even when she cannot afford them. One day, she gets a magical camera that can turn everything it captures into real things. Lucy starts stealing things that are not hers. Cast: Xyriel Manabat, Alyanna Angeles, Dimples Romana, Yayo Aguila
97	"Kuryentina"	August 25, 2012
A girl named Tina wastes electricity. One day, Haring Kidlat decides to punish her and attacks her with lightning bolts. But this gives her the power to absorb electricity. Cast: Xyriel Manabat, Teddy Corpuz, Snooky Serna, Dexter Doria, Garie Concepcion, Gerald Pesigan
98	"Kids VS Zombies" (Note: The title is a play on the Plants vs. Zombies video game series.)	September 1, 2012
Em-Em is not fond of eating vegetables and loves junk food. She joins a health camp with her friends who also love eating junk food. A group of zombies attack their camp site and destroy all the vegetables. Cast: Xyriel Manabat, Eric Fructuoso, Valerie Concepcion, Malou Crisologo, Deydey Amansec
99	"Mitos Touch" (Note: The title is a play on the Greek myth of the Midas Touch.)	September 8, 2012
Mitos is a selfish young girl who is not fond of sharing her toys with others, including her younger sister. On her birthday, a magical fairy doll gives her the power to turn everything she touches to toys. Cast: Xyriel Manabat, Maricar Reyes, Jake Roxas, Juliana Palermo, Jillian Aguila
100	"Yaya Yaya Puto Maya" (Note: The title is a play on the taunt "gaya-gaya puto maya".)	September 15, 2012
A rude young girl named Maya doesn't respect people and her parents. In order to teach her a lesson, a mysterious elderly woman turns Maya's parents into their younger selves. Cast: Xyriel Manabat, Christian Vasquez, Vina Morales, Mark Sayarot, Eliza Pineda, Joshen Bernardo, Joy Viado, Eva Darren, Perla Bautista
101	"Eat Play Love" (Note: The title is a play on the 2010 film Eat Pray Love.)	September 22, 2012
An ungrateful young girl named Katty likes to play with her food. Her mother tries to discipline her and wishes that all the food should come to life and punish her daughter but the wish came true, magically turning all the food come to life. Cast: Xyriel Manabat, Regine Tolentino, Arnold Reyes, Rubi-Rubi, Andre Tiangco
102	"Hear na U, Sori na Me" (Note: The title is a play on the 2011 film Ligo na Ü, Lapit na Me.)	September 29, 2012
Tanya has inherited her mother’s arrogance, firing employees without even listening to their side of the story. When their ears suddenly transform into those of a rat, a bunny, and an elephant, Tanya and her mother are forced to listen in ways they never have before, finally learning to admit their mistakes. Cast: Xyriel Manabat, Mylene Dizon, Matthew Mendoza, Cai Cortez, David Chua
103	"Plastik Pantastik" (Note: The title is based on one of the lyrics from the song "Barbie Girl" by pop group Aqua, and the character Barbie is named after the fashion doll of the same name.)	October 6, 2012
Barbie does not understand the consequences of using and selling plastic bags in the city. She will learn her lesson when she mysteriously turns into a plastic bag herself. Cast: Xyriel Manabat, Jeffrey Quizon, Matet de Leon, Izzy Canillo
104	"The Amazing Gelliescope"	October 13, 2012
Gellie longs for the attention of her parents who are busy with their jobs. She gets a magical telescope that enables her to see everything. Soon, she starts spreading gossip about everyone. Cast: Xyriel Manabat, Jane Oineza, John Arcilla, Assunta de Rossi, Noel Colet, Marnie Lapuz, Queenie Sulit, Christine Joy De Guzman
105	"Bye Bye Bangungot"	October 20, 2012
A young girl named Audrey gets nightmares because she doesn't pray. She gets a dreamcatcher that can protect her from the nightmares. Cast: Xyriel Manabat, Coney Reyes, Louise Bernardo, Bugoy Cariño, Venus Raj
106	"Si Jingjing at ang Giant Baging"	October 27, 2012
Jing-jing always helps her mother at the market in selling vegetables, but they are return penniless, thanks to her lazy stepfather and brothers. One day, she finds a magic beanstalk, through which she becomes friends with a giant that gives her huge vegetables to sell in the market. Cast: Xyriel Manabat, Aaron Junatas, Isay Alvarez, Dennis Padilla, Yong-an Chiu, Janus del Prado, Louella de Cordova
107	"Trick or Trixie" (Note: The title is a play on trick or treat.)	November 3, 2012
Trixie does not believe in the value of visiting her departed loved ones during All Saints' Day and All Souls' Day. Once, at a cemetery, she meets Pamboy, a young boy, who challenges her to make a ball of candle wax. In her desire to win, Trixie violates the graves and incites the anger of some souls. Cast: Xyriel Manabat, James Blanco, Wendy Valdez, Maliksi Morales, Jayson Gainza, Phoebe Kay Arbotante, Simon Ibarra, Erin Ocampo, Rollie Inocencio, Dang Cruz, Menggie Cobarrubias, Peewee O'Hara

==== Season 4 (2012–2013) ====
No. in season	Title	Original release date
108	"Ang Monito ni Monika"	November 10, 2012
Monika, a young woman, believes that all good deeds have a price. She gets a magical box that rewards her for all the things that she has done for others. Cast: Cristine Reyes, Carlo Aquino, Allyson Lualhati, Elaine Quemuel, Jaime Fabregas
109	"I'll Be Home for Christmas" (Note: The title is based on the Christmas song of the same name.)	November 17, 2012
Carl is a young man who wants to forget the memories of his family. Bitter about his past, he decides to sell the house he inherited from his parents, trying to turn his back on them. When several strangers help him see the value of family, Carl gradually learns to forgive and open his heart once again. Cast: Sam Milby, Empress Schuck, Alex Castro, Kathleen Hermosa, JM Briones, Annica Tindoy, Nathaniel Britt, Susan Campos, Giovannie Baldessari, Joonee Gamboa
110	"Jingle's Bell"	November 24, 2012
A young woman named Jingle always wants to be ahead of others. In order to earn more, she disobeys her father's principles and starts selling smuggled Christmas decorations. Cast: Erich Gonzales, Bembol Roco, Susan Africa, Jairus Aquino, Clarence Delgado, Wilma Doesnt
111	"The Perfect Gift"	December 1, 2012
Joanna didn't have a beautiful childhood and so she feels that children should get whatever they ask for. For her son, she buys expensive toys and clothes, thinking that it is enough for him to have a happy childhood. Cast: Carmina Villarroel, Jeffrey Santos, Carlos Agassi, Yogo Singh, Harvey Bautista, Dexie Daulat, Janica Pareño
112	"Wansapana-Ride"	December 8, 2012
Madelyn, a hardworking paramedic, just wants to spend Christmas with her family. But she is forced to leave her house to attend to an emergency situation at a carnival where she will meet the statues of Christmas characters that will magically turn into life. Cast: Diana Zubiri, Ejay Falcon, Helga Krapf, Aldred Gatchalian, Cara Eriguel, Lito Pimentel, Cheska Iñigo, Angelo Garcia, Jappy Mercado, Arlene Tolibas, Toby Alejar
113	"Ang Kulay ng Pasko"	December 15, 2012
Abby, a young woman who did not have a wealthy lifestyle while growing up. Because of her dream to experience luxury, Abby worked very hard to provide for her siblings by giving them fancy toys and clothes. However, as Abby and her siblings experience the good and comfortable life, her colleagues and family begin to discover her negative side. Cast: Angel Locsin, Nikki Valdez, Jon Achaval, Lui Manansala, Gigi Locsin, Andre Garcia, Sofia Millares
114	"Ang Bagong Kampeon ng Bagong Taon"	December 29, 2012
Melody is given a magical image of Greek god Janus that can show her the past and the future. She decides to go back to her childhood and change her own fate. Cast: Angeline Quinto, Dianne Medina, Liezel Garcia, Jeffrey Hidalgo, Amy Nobleza, Marlann Flores, Kyline Alcantara, Tess Antonio
115	"Gagambuboy"	January 5, 2013
Buboy, a young boy who is fond of playing with spiders, is punished for his bad attitude by being transformed into a human spider. Through this experience, he comes to understand the importance of animals and insects. Cast: Zaijian Jaranilla, Gerald Pesigan, John Judelei Junio, Yayo Aguila
116	"Number One Father & Son"	January 12, 2013
Carl, a young boy who is very close to his father. When they entered a father and son nature trek challenge, Carl's father meets his high school classmate who used to bully him around. Because of this, Carl's dad became more focused on winning the competition than spending quality time with his own son. Cast: Zaijian Jaranilla, Bugoy Cariño, Epi Quizon, Christopher Roxas, Melisa Cantiveros, Jason Francisco, Keanna Reeves
117	"Kapitan Liit"	January 19, 2013
Lino is a young boy who doesn't listen to his parents. When a typhoon is reported to hit their area, he chooses to play with his friends instead of helping his father prepare for the coming disaster. When his parents mysteriously disappear along with all the town's residents, Lino finally realises the importance of obeying and listening to his parents. Cast: Zaijian Jaranilla, Christine Joy de Guzman, Arthur Nixon, Carlos Dala, Deydey Amansec, Ricardo Cepeda, Sharmaine Suarez
118	"Si Paolo at si Apollo"	January 26, 2013
Paolo is a young boy who is addicted to computer games, always choosing to play instead of paying attention to his mother. Despite all her efforts, he continues to ignore everything she gives or tells him. When the characters from his favourite games magically come to life, Paolo begins to realise what he has been taking for granted and finally learns to treasure his parents' love. Cast: Zaijian Jaranilla, Angel Aquino, Joem Bascon, Cacai Bautista, Alex Castro
119	"Nicolas Layas"	February 2, 2013
Nicolas is a young boy who grew up with a wealthy lifestyle. When their house burns down, his family was suddenly forced to live on a tight budget and move in with his uncle, who lives in a much smaller house. There, his mom and uncle give him their childhood toy, a talking turtle hand puppet that can do anything he wants. As he relies on it more and more, Nicolas starts feeling frustrated with his new life and eventually decides to run away from home, thinking he will be better off on his own. The story asks whether Nicolas will learn to be content with what his family has and realise that running away from home is never the answer. Cast: Zaijian Jaranilla, Smokey Manaloto, Katya Santos, Buboy Garovillo
120	"Kilalang Kilala Ka Ba Niya?"	February 9, 2013
Kael is a little boy who never gives time to his own family, always choosing his friends over them. On his father's birthday, he even sneaks out to play instead of celebrating at home. When a mysterious curse suddenly makes his entire family forget who he is, Kael begins to realise the weight of his actions and finally understands the true importance of the people he loves. Cast: Zaijian Jaranilla, Alyanna Angeles, Thou Reyes, Jake Roxas, Ana Roces
121	"Teacher's Pest"	February 16, 2013
A young boy named Wesley is fond of pulling pranks on his classmates and teachers. After Wesley pranked his teacher again, three ghosts turn Wesley into a rat as a punishment. Cast: Zaijian Jaranilla, Yen Santos, Manuel Chua, Cherry Lou, Nathaniel Britt, Lui Villaruz, Rubi-Rubi, Boom Labrusca, Daria Ramirez
122	"Gigie in a Bottle" (Note: The title is a play on the Christina Aguilera song "Genie in a Bottle".)	February 23, 2013
A young boy who was considering to a boy scout member saw a bottle with a prisoned goddess named Gigie, while on a scout ranger tour in a forest. Gigie insisted that she was trapped a long time ago in the Colonial times and she will seek revenge once she was free from the bottle. Cast: Zaijian Jaranilla, Maricar Reyes, Jason Abalos, Hermie Concepcion, Jojit Lorenzo
123	"Kukotakot"	March 2, 2013
Kokoy is a young boy who refuses to cut his nails because of a bad experience, and his dirty, harmful hands push his family and friends away. When his nails begin to grow magically and uncontrollably, he wonders if this strange event will finally push him to take care of his body and make nail-cutting a habit. Cast: Zaijian Jaranilla, Niño Muhlach, Dimples Romana, John Manalo, Jacob Clayton, Spanky Manikan
124	"Baby Ko ang Daddy Ko" (Note: The title is a play on the sitcom Vampire ang Daddy Ko, to which they share the same release date.)	March 9, 2013
Paul disagrees with his father's strict rules and is always arguing with him. One day, during an eclipse, Paul and his dad mysteriously switch personalities after one of their arguments. Cast: Zaijian Jaranilla, Dominic Ochoa, Susan Africa, Marissa Sanchez, Maui Taylor
125	"Hungry Games" (Note: The title is a play on The Hunger Games franchise.)	March 16, 2013
Tonton is fond of eating junk food and skipping meals. One night, his soul is detached from his body and is brought to a world where he meets kids who have also taken food for granted. Now Tonton must experience extreme hunger in order to see his family again. Cast: Zaijian Jaranilla, Yogo Singh, Gerald Pesigan, Junyka Santarin, Micko Laurente, Precious Lara Quigaman, Jaime Fabregas, Boots Anson-Roa
126	"No Read No Write Nomar"	March 23, 2013
Nomar wants to become a great dancer and therefore, takes studies for granted. One day, he meets a scientist, who gives him a magic potion that makes him an amazing dancer, but takes away his skills to read and write. Cast: Zaijian Jaranilla, Lito Pimentel, Assunta de Rossi, Archie Alemania, Brenna Peñaflor, Brace Arquiza, Sasha Arquiza
127	"Finding Nilo" (Note: The title is a play on the 2003 animated film Finding Nemo.)	April 6, 2013
Nilo turns into a fish as a punishment after he accidentally steps on a dakuwaka — a rare fish believed to be the guardian of the sea. To return to his normal self, he must go on a mission to save the mother dakuwaka from the researchers who have captured it. Cast: Bugoy Cariño, Ella Cruz, Buboy Garovillo, Malou Crisologo, Arnold Reyes, Elaine Quemuel, Nikki Valdez, Noel Trinidad
128	"Ang Nawawalang Ngipin ni Tootsie"	April 13, 2013
The story revolves around a girl named Tootsie who doesn't brush her teeth everyday. As her problem persists when she is sleeping, her set of teeth magically come to life and left her gums. Cast: Sofia Millares, Tina Paner, Rhett Romero, Manilyn Reynes
129	"Ang Batang Buhawi"	April 20, 2013
Badong wants to be a superhero. One day, he comes across his friend's cape that has superpowers. He steals it and starts using it to help people for money. Cast: Maliksi Morales, Angelo Garcia, Jubail Andres, Carl Villanueva, Icon Santos, K Brosas, Benjie Paras
130	"Bokbok, Ang Batang Mapanubok"	April 27, 2013
Bokbok is a disobedient child who doesn't want to obey his elders. As he is disobedient, Bokbok is captured by a witch named Divina who uses him to steal from others. Cast: Clarence Delgado, Julia Barretto, Julian Estrada, Arlene Muhlach, Mylene Dizon
131	"Eye Naku!"	May 4, 2013
A young girl named Maita has poor eyesight. The leader of the germs decides to make her eyes its new home. This gives Maita super vision powers and now she can see things like a microscope. Cast: Dexie Daulat, Khalil Ramos, Michelle Vito, Rubi-Rubi, Gigi Locsin, Christine Joy de Guzman, Patricia Camo, JM Briones
132	"Mommy on Duty"	May 11, 2013
Topher is always belittling his mother, and therefore, she turns into a robot that treats its responsibilities like a regular job. Now the children don't feel loved anymore and understand the value of their mother. Cast: Vina Morales, Yogo Singh, Jane Oineza, Jon Lucas, Kean Cipriano
133	"Mommynappers"	May 18, 2013
Tyrone, a young boy, spends most of his time researching about aliens rather than helping his mother, Agnes. Things get an ugly turn when some aliens kidnap her. Cast: Lance Angelo Lucido, Yayo Aguila, Kit Thompson, Ingrid dela Paz, Nanette Inventor, Gerald Pesigan, Bea Basa, Casey de Silva
134	"Flores De Yayo"	May 25, 2013
An episode that will teach kids and families on important lesson about keeping promises. Yayo is a young girl with asthma who needed to go to the province to cure her illness. When she discovered the secret of the woman who was cursed to become a flower named Dahlia, Yayo promised that she will keep the secret when her asthma is cured. Because of her amazement, Yayo decided to share to a sick old man about Dahlia's special powers. Cast: Larah Claire Sabroso, Cris Villanueva, Candy Pangilinan, Dominic Roque, Liza Soberano, Melissa Ricks, Ana Roces, Josh Ivan Morales, Tommy Abuel
135	"Tago, Diego, Tago!"	June 1, 2013
Diego, a young boy, grows up in poverty, as his parents didn't complete their studies. They are always hiding from the landlord as they don't have the money to pay rent. One day, Diego finds a magic wand from a pair of magicians that he uses to hide his parents. Cast: Louise Abuel, Dante Rivero, Valerie Concepcion, Joross Gamboa, James Blanco, Nico Antonio, Marvin Yap, Ruben Gonzaga, Jojo Alejar
136	"Copy Kat"	June 8, 2013
The episode revolves around a kind and studious young girl named Kat, and a school bully, Bea. As Bea keeps on bullying Kat, the school statue switches the personality of the two students and lets them experience each other's life. Cast: Brenna Garcia, Veyda Inoval, Emilio Garcia, Pinky Amador, Rommel Padilla, Mickey Ferriols, Fred Payawan, Ian Galliguez, Ramon Bautista
137	"Doggy, Daddy, Doggy!"	June 15, 2013
Ian Mark, a young boy, was solely raised by his father. Because of his busy schedule, his father is not able to spend much time with him, and this makes Ian think that he is not important to his father anymore. On his birthday, Ian wishes for his dad to be locked up in their home so he can spend more time with him. However, the wish ended up switching his dad's soul with that of a dog. Cast: JB Agustin, Jake Roxas, Pinky Marquez, Chokoleit
138	"Dolly Daldal"	June 22, 2013
Dolly is a talkative girl who always says whatever is on her mind, without caring if she hurts other people’s feelings. Because of this, she gets into trouble when someone she insulted casts a spell on her, causing her mouth to go out of control and speak mean things to anyone, anywhere she goes. Cast: Alyanna Angeles, Ara Mina, Marikit Morales, John Regala, Arlene Muhlach, Jong Cuenco, Vangie Labalan

==== Season 5 (2013–2014) ====
No. in season	Title	Original release date
139–143	"Petrang Paminta"	June 29, 2013
139–143	"Petrang Paminta"	July 27, 2013
It is a story of sisters, Petra and Aya, who work at a pepper farm owned by their cruel aunt. A dwarf named Pampam starts helping them secretly, out of pity, and also because of his special admiration for Petra. Cast: Julia Barretto, Zaijian Jaranilla, Xyriel Manabat, Diego Loyzaga, Kiray Celis, Rubi-Rubi, Epi Quizon, Maricar de Mesa, Jayson Gainza, Tess Antonio, Joey Paras, Alora Sasam, Ronie "Atak" Araña, Louise Bernardo, Yogo Singh, Dexie Daulat, Emilio Garcia
144–148	"OMG! Oh My Genius!"	August 3, 2013
144–148	"OMG! Oh My Genius!"	August 31, 2013
The story is about the value of family love, hard work and the dangerous effects of misusing power. Edison's (Bugoy Cariño) life begins to change because of the super powers he acquired from Benson (Francis Magundayao). Despite his sister Minnie's (Ella Cruz) disapproval, Edison still keeps on using his powers to read the minds of other people to pass his exams at school. Cast: Bugoy Cariño, Ella Cruz, Francis Magundayao, Jason Francisco, Igi Boy Flores, Meryll Soriano, Dennis Padilla, Markki Stroem, Daisy Cariño, Rollie Inocencio
149–153	"My Fairy Kasambahay"	September 7, 2013
149–153	"My Fairy Kasambahay"	October 5, 2013
Elyza is a brat and mistreats people who work at her house. She must learn a lesson through some magic from a maid who turns out to be a fairy. Cast: Kim Chiu, Joseph Marco, John Lapus, Shamaine Buencamino, Angel Aquino, Miguel Vergara, Ian Galliguez, Erin Ocampo, Elisse Joson, Simon Ibarra, Josh Ivan Morales, Lui Manansala, Maliksi Morales, Marikit Morales, Cecil Paz, Peewee O' Hara
154–158	"Moomoo Knows Best"	October 12, 2013
154–158	"Moomoo Knows Best"	November 9, 2013
Joanna is a fake spiritualist that will encounter various adventures especially when all her lies come true and she begins to see actual ghosts. Cast: Ai-Ai delas Alas, Izzy Canillo, Cherry Pie Picache, Marco Gumabao, Michelle Vito, Jojit Lorenzo
159	"The Christmas Visitor"	November 16, 2013
Marian is the daughter of a wealthy businessman who falls in love with a janitor named Joey. Because of his desire to get the acceptance of Marian's father, Joey wishes on a magical Christmas ornament to provide him with beautiful decorations and delicious food for the special visit of Marian's family. However, fate will test Joey's kindness as other people who are much in need ask for his help. Cast: Ejay Falcon, Julia Montes, Tirso Cruz III, Perla Bautista, Janice Hung, CX Navarro
160	"Fruitcake"	November 23, 2013
Charles is the handsome boss and secret crush of an ugly duckling named Elaine. Elaine's dream to make Charles fall for her eventually comes true when she is given a magic bowl that makes her attractive in the eyes of the person who eats a fruitcake she bakes in it. Cast: Alex Gonzaga, Sam Milby, Eda Nolan, William Martinez, Arlene Muhlach, Thou Reyes, Beauty Gonzalez, Hermie Concepcion, Clarence Delgado
161	"Give Gloves on Christmas Day" (Note: The title is a play on the Christmas song "Give Love on Christmas Day" by American pop band The Jackson 5.)	November 30, 2013
A special Christmas episode that will teach the whole family the value of giving. It is the story of Queenie, a greedy toy store owner. When Quennie decided to adopt three kids for the kid-friendly image of her business, a pair of magical gloves becomes attached to Queenie's hands and forces her to give away everything she has. Cast: Pokwang, Gina Pareño, Louise Abuel, Belle Mariano, Brenna Garcia, Lloyd Zaragoza, Niña Dolino
162	"Sako Lantern"	December 7, 2013
Shaggy is a young orphan who never believed in Christmas or in Santa Claus, until he suddenly meets the very person he thought wasn't real. As he gets pulled into helping with Santa's duties, he begins to wonder if this experience will finally make him understand what Christmas truly means. Cast: Zaijian Jaranilla, Ronaldo Valdez, Sofia Millares, JB Agustin, Brace Arquiza, Gerald Pesigan
163	"The Christmas Tablet"	December 14, 2013
Era is a young girl who longs for the attention and time of her busy mother Mila. When Mila gives her a magical tablet computer, Era begins to see her mom suffering at work. Cast: Xyriel Manabat, Mylene Dizon, Dante Rivero, Giselle Sanchez, Alora Sasam, Mel Kimura, Lara Sabroso, Diamond Delahenty, Jiz Jocareza, Sofia Dischner
164	"Simbang Gabi"	December 21, 2013
Caloy (Coco Martin) is a young police officer who is forced to take care of his Lola Fenny (Susan Roces), a devotee of the Simbang Gabi tradition. Through the help of a magical star, Caloy is able to get everything he asks for including the promotion he has always wanted. However, Caloy starts to feel that his grandmother is getting in the way of his plans because she is taking too much of his time. Cast: Coco Martin, Susan Roces, Aaliyah Belmoro, Lance Lucido, Allan Paule, Yutaka Yamakawa, Rene Tandoc, Danica Sese, Wendy Villacorta
165–171	"Enchanted House"	January 4, 2014
165–171	"Enchanted House"	February 15, 2014
Philip and Alice are two friends who are the kids of old flames. Because of their parents' bitter past, conflict starts to arise between the two families, especially when they all found out about the curse that Philip's mother put on Alice's parents. Cast: Nash Aguas, Alexa Ilacad, Ara Mina, Dominic Ochoa, Nikki Valdez, Candy Pangilinan, Jaime Fabregas, Celine Lim, Brace Arquiza, Marikit Morales, Aldred Nasayao
172–178	"Si Lulu at si Lily Liit"	March 1, 2014
172–178	"Si Lulu at si Lily Liit"	April 12, 2014
The story of a young girl named Lulu and her twin sister Lily, who is cursed to become as little as an elf. Before the twins were born, Lulu and Lily's parents asked a dwarf to grant their wish to have a complete family. However, Lulu's family faces a new problem as other people begin to find out about Lily's extraordinary characteristic. Cast: Sharlene San Pedro, Jairus Aquino, Francis Magundayao, Paul Salas, Assunta de Rossi, Ron Morales, John Lapus, Desiree del Valle, John Medina, JB Agustin, Nikki Bagaporo
179–185	"My Guardian Angel"	April 26, 2014
179–185	"My Guardian Angel"	June 8, 2014
A story that will teach families different life lessons. Because of her parents' lack of attention to her, Ylia is ready to prove herself and do everything to feel the love of her family. Unknown to her, her guardian angel Kiko has been right beside her all along to help her achieve her goals. Cast: Raikko Mateo, Andrea Brillantes, Mylene Dizon, Gerard Pizarras, Rubi-Rubi, Ejay Falcon, Dale Baldillo, Abby Bautista, Racquel Pareño, Lui Villaruz, Ketchup Eusebio, Marvin Yap, Vangie Martelle, Jovic Susim, Kyle Banzon

==== Season 6 (2014–2015) ====
No. in season	Title	Original release date
187–193	"Witch-A-Makulit" (Note: This is the first episode to be aired in high-definition.)	June 15, 2014
187–193	"Witch-A-Makulit"	July 27, 2014
A magical story for kids and families. Krystal is a young girl who belongs to a family of witches. This is a story that will share a lot of important values especially obedience, with the help of Krystal, Jade and Emerald. Cast: Miles Ocampo, Alyanna Angeles, Inah Estrada, Benjie Paras, Malou Crisologo, Wilma Doesnt, Niña Dolino, Jon Lucas, Kristel Fulgar, Chienna Filomeno, CJ Navato
194–201	"Nato de Coco"	August 3, 2014
194–201	"Nato de Coco"	August 24, 2014
A reimagining of Rod Santiago's "Nato De Coco" episode. Oca is a professional basketball player and the father of Nato. Because of his busy schedule, Oca fails to give enough time and attention to his family, especially to his only son who is his number one fan. After his passing, Oca reincarnates as a coconut to help his struggling family. Cast: Vhong Navarro, Louise Abuel, Carmina Villarroel, Ella Cruz, Joshua Dionisio, Sofia Millares, Yogo Singh, Epi Quizon
202–209	"Perfecto"	August 30, 2014
202–209	"Perfecto"	September 21, 2014
Perry is a young man who wanted to be perfect to please his mother and his crush Kylie. Because of his insecurities, Perry is determined to do everything to achieve his dreams. Perry then meets a purple blob-like alien named Bounce that can do everything Perry wanted. Cast: Nash Aguas, Alexa Ilacad, John Bermundo, Joaquin Reyes, Brace Arquiza, Grae Fernandez, Matet de Leon, Vandolph Quizon, Candy Pangilinan, Melai Cantiveros, Guji Lorenzana, Alexa Macanan
210–220	"My App #Boyfie" (Note: Based on the Wattpad novel of the same name by Noreen Capili.)	September 27, 2014
210–220	"My App #Boyfie"	October 26, 2014
Anika is a young woman who has never had a boyfriend. However, Anika's life begins to change when her "dream boy", Jowa a.k.a. Joe, whom she created through an application in her magical tablet computer, comes to life. Cast: Nadine Lustre, James Reid, Dominic Roque, Cherie Gil, Jazzmin McDonald, Elisse Joson, Ingrid dela Paz, Malou Crisologo, Marco Pingol
221–228	"Puppy Ko Si Papi"	November 9, 2014
221–228	"Puppy Ko Si Papi"	December 28, 2014
As her dad mysteriously transforms into a dog, Iris will need to correct her mistakes to bring her father Douglas back to being human once again. Cast: Kathryn Bernardo, Dominic Ochoa, Khalil Ramos, Marlann Flores, Chienna Filomeno, Apollo Abraham, John Steven de Guzman, John Lapus
229–233	"Wish Upon a Lusis"	January 11, 2015
229–233	"Wish Upon a Lusis"	February 8, 2015
Joy is a young girl who grew up in an orphanage and longs for a family who will truly love and accept her. She finds unexpected inspiration in JP, a popular celebrity, and she begins to wonder how her life might change if she could meet him. With the help of a magical lusis (sparkler), Joy soon gets the chance to see JP in person. As their paths cross, the story asks how this encounter will transform Joy's lonely world and whether the two of them can fulfill each other's wish to feel, and finally find the love of a family they have both been searching for. Cast: Julia Barretto, Iñigo Pascual, Susan Africa, Perla Bautista, Bobby Andrews, Eunice Lagusad, Miguel Vergara, Kazumi Porquez, Daisy Reyes, Ana Roces
234–238	"Remote ni Eric"	February 15, 2015
234–238	"Remote ni Eric"	March 15, 2015
This episode will teach kids the value of obedience. It revolves around the life of Eric, a disobedient young boy who doesn't want to be controlled by others. Eric's life begins to change when he is given a magic remote control that gives him the power to control and manipulate the lives of other people. Cast: Harvey Bautista, Sue Ramirez, Cherry Pie Picache, Joel Torre, Alexander Diaz, Allyson McBride, Arjo Atayde, Tony Manalo, Francis Ryan Lim, Kim Aerok Llono
239–251	"Yamishita's Treasures" (Note: The title is a play on the name of the legendary hidden treasure in the Philippines known as the Yamashita treasure.)	March 22, 2015
239–251	"Yamishita's Treasures"	June 14, 2015
It revolves around the story of Yami, a treasure hunter who will enter the world of fairies, where he will meet Tanya, one of the fairies. Cast: Coco Martin, Julia Montes, Alonzo Muhlach, Eddie Garcia, Angel Aquino, Bing Loyzaga, Nonie Buencamino, Arron Villaflor, Marlann Flores, Ryan Bang
252–260	"My Kung Fu Chinito"	June 21, 2015
252–260	"My Kung Fu Chinito"	August 16, 2015
Diego becomes the martial arts superhero "Kung Fu Chinito" due to a yin-yang medallion that gives him powers. Cast: Enchong Dee, Richard Yap, Rio Locsin, David Chua, Sofia Andres, Clarence Delgado, Mutya Orquia, Kurt Ong
261–269	"I Heart Kuryente Kid" (Note: Stylized as "I ♥️ Kuryente Kid")	August 30, 2015
261–269	"I Heart Kuryente Kid"	October 25, 2015
Meet Tonyo, a boy who was electrocuted which gives him electric powers to help people who are in danger and in which he will fall in love with a news reporter named Penelope. Cast: Ejay Falcon, Alex Gonzaga, Miguel Vergara, Malou Crisologo, Fourth Solomon, Tirso Cruz III

==== Season 7 (2015–2019) ====
No. in season	Title	Original release date
270	"Fat Patty" (Note: This is the first episode of the 15 Magical Years television special.)	November 8, 2015
This episode will teach people the value of obedience. Patty is a fat girl who wanted to win a beauty contest. She didn't want to be fat, so she wanted to drink a slim potion. As the series progresses, she starts to abuse the potion, just because she wanted to win the contest. Eventually, Patty becomes flat, and realized that she needs to start listening to her mother. Cast: Janella Salvador, Marlo Mortel, Zsa Zsa Padilla, Cai Cortez, Jef Gaitan, Claire Ruiz Hartell, Kristel Fulgar, Elisse Joson
271	"Lara Burara"	November 15, 2015
Lara is a young girl fascinated with toys. One day, she and her mother buy a handmade doll at a toy store. Coincidentally, Pinpin, the daughter of their laundrywoman, also wants to buy the doll and even saves money just to have it. However, after a while, Lara gets bored with the doll and takes it for granted. Little does she know that the doll carries a magic spell with it. Cast: Ashley Sarmiento, Rhed Bustamante, Dominic Ochoa, Agot Isidro, Tart Carlos, Gee Canlas
272	"Kenny Kaliwete"	November 22, 2015
Kenny wants to help his dad, a police officer, in seizing Black Shadow, a well-known cat burglar. However, using his magic, Black Shadow outsmarts the authorities and manages to escape. With his escape, he leaves his magic glove, which suddenly sticks to Kenny's hands. Now that he wears the glove, Kenny becomes an expert cat burglar and steals everything that he wants. Cast: Marco Masa, Carlo Aquino, Mark Bautista, Lui Manansala, Nicco Manalo
273	"Selfie Pa More, Sasha No More" (Note: The episode was replayed on April 14, 2019, after the show's original run had ended, as a tribute to Chokoleit, who died on March 9, 2019.)	November 29, 2015
Sasha is an Internet sensation but she lies to all, others say she is just a poser. She got what she wished for, as she was cursed to vanish piece by piece. Cast: Julia Barretto, Kenzo Gutierrez, Chokoleit, Lilet, Almira Muhlach, Jong Cuenco, Dante Ponce, Inah Estrada, Anna Vicente, Axel Torres
274	"Raprap's Wrapper"	December 6, 2015
Coming from a poor family, Raprap always envies his rich classmates. He wants everything he has changed, including his mother Sioneng. One day, Raprap gets a magic wrapper that has powers of changing everything it wraps. He then starts with his house, which turns into a mansion. After magically changing their house, Raprap transforms her mother into the sophisticated and rich woman Sonia. As he realizes the differences between Sioneng and Sonia, Raprap decides to bring back everything the way it was. Cast: CX Navarro, Ruffa Gutierrez, Pokwang, Jojit Lorenzo
275	"Noche Buena Gang"	December 13, 2015
Ely is turned into lechon (roasted pig), Enzo is turned into a queso de bola, and Mon is turned into hamón, by a fairy named Gracia, and they become the Noche Buena Gang, a trio of superheroes. These three children will learn how to share with other people at the end. Cast: Marc Santiago, JB Agustin, Miguel Vergara, Sophia Baars, Smokey Manaloto, Melai Cantiveros
276	"Percy Maninisi"	December 20, 2015
Percy receives a magical tablet as a gift from dwarves. Percy then changes the appearance of each person because of the magical tablet, but he does it too much. Cast: Clarence Delgado, Sofia Millares, Izzy Canillo, Jason Francisco, Daisy Cariño, Jan Marini, Benjie Paras
277	"Christmas Witch" (Note: This is the last episode of the 15 Magical Years television special.)	December 27, 2015
Irene, a girl who was born on Christmas Day, was granted by Christmas fairies named Rosal and Orchidia; intelligence, good-looks, and irresistible appeal. As Irene becomes a full-grown woman, she gets much attention from people, especially from boys, due to her charm and wit. However, the praises get into her head and she becomes overly confident of herself. With this, Jessie, a boy that adores Irene so much and the two fairies' favorite letter sender, gets disappointed with her. Through a magic eyeglass, Jessie sees that Irene's heart is in the form of a witch, a reflection of her character. With the powers of the fairies, Jessie wishes Irene to become a witch to stop her from hurting boys' feeling and to learn her lesson. The spell breaks if someone loves and accepts her despite being a witch and she was given time until the New Year. Cast: Janella Salvador, Elmo Magalona, Mutya Orquia, Kyle de Leon, Ramon Christopher, Christian Vasquez, Cheska Iñigo, Leo Rialp
278–286	"Susi ni Sisay"	January 3, 2016
278–286	"Susi ni Sisay"	February 28, 2016
The magical adventures of Chokee and Sisay as they come through several obstacles. Cast: Sharlene San Pedro, Marco Masa, Jairus Aquino, Jolina Magdangal, Marvin Agustin, Matet de Leon, Boom Labrusca, Franco Daza, Tetchie Agbayani
287–293	"That's My Toy, That's My Boy"	March 13, 2016
287–293	"That's My Toy, That's My Boy"	May 1, 2016
Jairo loves to play Society of Soldiers, a spoof of the Defense of the Ancients (DotA) game series. He summons one of the characters, Raven, to the real world. Despite warnings from his family, Jairo and Raven continue becoming friends. However, Raven disappears one night and the next morning patches of wood start appearing on his body. Jairo later turns up looking like Raven. Cast: Zaijian Jaranilla, John Michael Gacayan, Amy Nobleza, Benjie Paras, Smokey Manaloto, Gelli de Belen, Chinggoy Alonzo, Harvey Bautista, Alyanna Angeles, Kazumi Porquez, Joaquin Reyes, Paeng Sudayan, Benj Manalo
294–299	"Just Got Laki"	May 8, 2016
294–299	"Just Got Laki"	June 12, 2016
Macky is a boy who steals candies from Lolo Ken with his friends, Jimboy and Paopao. After eating the candies which they turn out to be magical, Macky and his friends suddenly became teenagers and into adults. Cast: Jessy Mendiola, JC de Vera, Raikko Mateo, Albie Casiño, Angel Aquino, Spanky Manikan, Nico Antonio, Nicco Manalo, JB Agustin, CX Navarro, Ricardo Cepeda, Xia Vigor, Chevin Cecilio, Arran Sese, Jojo Alejar
300–306	"Candy's Crush" (Note: The title is a play on the mobile video game Candy Crush Saga.)	June 26, 2016
300–306	"Candy's Crush"	August 7, 2016
Candy (Loisa Andalio) is a girl who has feelings for the campus heartthrob Paolo (Jerome Ponce). With his good looks and charm, Paolo can easily make girls fall for him. To get even with him, Candy, along with her friend Amanda, makes a love potion to lure his longtime crush. But things get out of hand when the potion takes effect and when Paolo drinks it, he turns up looking hideous. Only a true love's kiss could break the spell. Cast: Loisa Andalio, Jerome Ponce, Maria Isabel Lopez, Lorenzo Mara, Shey Bustamante, Michelle Vito, Erin Ocampo, Amy Nobleza, Claire Ruiz, Ruby Ruiz, Igi Boy Flores, Phi Palmos, Daniel Yambao, Raphael Robles, Angelo Alayon, Precious Lara Quigaman, Cessa Moncera
307–314	"Tikboyong"	August 14, 2016
307–314	"Tikboyong"	October 2, 2016
A childless couple, Domeng and Yeye, adopt an infant who turns out to be a tikboy when he grown up into a tikbalang. Diwalding the diwata and Flora gave him a calming serum in his magic milk. Boyong drinks the transformation serum to keep his human form. Boyong's powers as a tikbalang are strength and speed. His tikbalang traits have 3 gold hair strands. Boyong returns to the diwata kingdom. Cast: Mccoy de Leon, Alex Diaz, Epy Quizon, Nikki Valdez, Elisse Joson, Jai Agpangan, Alora Sasam, Jane de Leon, Jose Sarasola, Anna Vincente, Melizza Jimenez, Axel Torres, Raynald Simon
315–322	"Holly & Mau"	October 16, 2016
315–322	"Holly & Mau"	December 4, 2016
A fairy named Elisa fell in love with a human named Solomon, until Solomon finds a new love named Natalie. Elisa curses a woman named Holly (Janella Salvador) with a hideous appearance during sunset and back to human form at dawn. While staying in his parents' hometown, Mau (Elmo Magalona) meets a mysterious girl, presumably Holly. A fairy named Reyna (Mutya Orquia) breaks the curse. Cast: Janella Salvador, Elmo Magalona, CJ Navato, Kristel Fulgar, Isabel Granada, Lilet, Christian Vasquez, Mutya Orquia, Allyson McBride, Eric Fructuoso, Ria Atayde, MJ Abenales, Paeng Sudayan, Sunnyrose Peralta, Jason Fernandez, Lao Rodriquez
323–327	"Santi Cruz Is Coming to Town" (Note: The title is a play on the Christmas song "Santa Claus Is Comin' to Town" by Harry Reser and His Band.)	December 11, 2016
323–327	"Santi Cruz Is Coming to Town"	January 8, 2017
Nicole works at the Lingap Tahanan Orphanage. Santiago (Paulo Avelino) and Nicole Dizon (Ritz Azul) know each other since orphanage but "Santi" doesn't realize her. Nicole reveals someone with magical red gloves who is greedy. Cast: Paulo Avelino, Ritz Azul, Malou de Guzman, Menggie Cobarrubias, Debraliz, Nonong "Bangkay" de Andrés, Nico Antonio, Franchesca Floirendo, Karen Reyes, Marnie Lapuz, Harvey Bautista, Brenna Garcia, JM Gagayan, Lara Fajardo
328–337	"My Hair Lady" (Note: The title is a play on the South Korean television series My Fair Lady.)	January 22, 2017
328–337	"My Hair Lady"	March 26, 2017
Maria Anna, now Goldie, is a Rapunzel-inspired character with the golden hair of Manang Mariana. Goldie is the daughter of Cristy and Marcus. She was later revealed to be cursed with the hair. Cast: Loisa Andalio, Jameson Blake, Mark Oblea, Matet de Leon, Bobby Andrews, Nikki Valdez, Polo Ravales, Christopher Roxas, Fifth Solomon, Welwel Silvestre, Milo Demilo Jr., Jordan Hong, Hermie Concepcion, AJ Urquia
338–352	"Annika PINTAsera"	April 2, 2017
338–352	"Annika PINTAsera"	July 9, 2017
Annika, an intelligent but arrogant businesswoman, falls under a curse after a fairy witnessed her unjust betrayal of her childhood friend Jerome. As she searches for a guy who will break her curse, Annika is transformed by a valuable lesson. Cast: Julia Montes, JC Santos, Maris Racal, Heaven Peralejo, Kiray Celis, Ana Roces, Michael Flores, Candy Pangilinan, John Lapus, Nico Antonio, Frenchie Dy, Maika Rivera, Joe Vargas, Amy Nobleza, Marco Masa, Dunhill Banzon, Carmen Del Rosario
353–362	"Amazing Ving"	July 23, 2017
353–362	"Amazing Ving"	September 24, 2017
Ving is a loving and obedient son raised by his doting parents Cris and Soffy. He lives a happy life with his parents, who have taught him that having compassion is enough to make a person a superhero. Although he has a noble heart, Ving always gets picked on and is not well accepted by his classmates Chelsea and Warren. Despite this, Ving continues to spread kindness to other people and remains determined to chase his dreams. The ordinary teenager's life changes when he meets Super Bing, a superhero who saves his life from danger. Because of his inherent kindness, Super Bing chooses him as her successor and transforms him into Super Ving after giving him a magical stone that gives anyone superpowers to save innocent people's lives. But aside from keeping peace and harmony, he has a bigger mission to fulfill: finishing Reptilya and her evil plans. Though equipped with the magical stone, it will not be easy for Super Ving because aside from Reptilya, her minions will also bring chaos and wreak havoc in people's lives. But with his pure heart and superpowers, he will make sure that goodness will prevail in the end. Cast: Awra Briguela, Roderick Paulate, Carmi Martin, Bianca Manalo, AC Bonifacio, Marco Gallo, Kisses Delavin, Ellen Adarna, Ria Atayde, Tess Antonio, Onyok Pineda, Xia Vigor
363–368	"Louie's Biton" (Note: The title is a play on the luxury fashion brand Louis Vuitton.)	October 1, 2017
363–368	"Louie's Biton"	November 5, 2017
Louie, a kid was given a magical shoe polish by a mysterious man. But he became ambitious, and it's up to the magical shoe polish on how to deal with him. Cast: Grae Fernandez, Andrea Brillantes, Aljur Abrenica, Louise delos Reyes, Dimples Romana, Irma Adlawan, Jojit Lorenzo, Mico Palanca, Simon Ibarra, Marina Benipayo, Dionne Lapuz, Paeng Sudayan, Brace Arquiza
369–379	"Jasmin's Flower Powers"	November 12, 2017
369–379	"Jasmin's Flower Powers"	January 21, 2018
Jasmin is an orphan who got separated from her sister Daisy after their parents Dahlia and Oscar died in an accident. Despite living without her family, her boyfriend Thor brings her constant joy. However, the young man's mother disapproves of their relationship and even threatens Jasmin, which forces them to part ways. In spite of losing her boyfriend, she regains another important person in her life when she finally reunites with her long lost sister. This marks the start of a new journey for the siblings as they go on a mission to bring back the perfect family they once had. One day, a flower fairy shows up to Jasmin and reveals the truth about her parents death. The fairy tells the sisters that Dahlia and Oscar had been put under a spell after they abused the power of the white magic seedling, and that it was only their father who died, while their mother remains imprisoned as a magical flower as punishment. To save their mother, they are given one black magic seedling each, which they need to turn into white by doing good deeds to enter the land of the fairies. However, it will not be easy for the siblings. Unlike Jasmin, Daisy has so much hatred in her heart due to the maltreatment she experienced under her foster parents' care, keeping her black seedling from turning into white. Cast: Janella Salvador, Elmo Magalona, Heaven Peralejo, Francis Magundayao, Arlene Muhlach, Rufa Mae Quinto, Lui Villaruz, Bernadette Allyson
380–394	"Gelli in a Bottle" (Note: The title is a play on the Christina Aguilera song "Genie in a Bottle".)	February 4, 2018
380–394	"Gelli in a Bottle"	May 13, 2018
Gelli is a young lady who is often ridiculed for her physical appearance but finds a way to make herself more beautiful through a genie, whom she summons from a magical bottle. However, not contented with having only three wishes, Gelli wishes to be as powerful as the genie so she could have all her desires as she pleases. Her wish of becoming powerful gets granted, but to her surprise, she gets locked inside the magical bottle and can only escape once a person wishes for her freedom just like a genie. With the spell cast on her, she meets Robin, a young man who luckily finds the magical bottle along the street. Believing that he is the person who will set her free, Gelli demands Robin to spend his last wish on her to bring her back to normal. But her inherent selfishness makes Robin mad, pushing him to resist Gelli's plead. Cast: Loisa Andalio, Ronnie Alonte, Lilet, Michael Flores, Barbie Imperial, Anjo Damiles, Raine Salamante, Cai Cortez, Rubi Rubi, Simon Ibarra, MJ Cayabyab, Eric Nicolas, Marnie Lapus, Jong Cuenco, Rhed Bustamante
395–403	"OFISHially Yours"	May 20, 2018
395–403	"OFISHially Yours"	July 15, 2018
Stella (Elisse Joson) is a woman who owns a club. She crosses paths with Jason (Joao Constancia), the leader of the Darker Than Black band, which plays regularly at the club she owned. Due to a disagreement between Stella and Jason, however, the band decides to leave the club, affecting its sales massively. To win back her most priced performers, Stella tries to lure Jason with her beauty but fails to succeed as the bandleader discovers her true intentions. With so much hatred in his heart, Jason wishes for Stella to vanish from his life, which a powerful fairy grants his wish that leads to Stella's unfortunate fate of getting cursed as a mermaid. Cast: Elisse Joson, Joao Constancia, Ford Valencia, Tristan Ramirez, Niel Murillo, Russell Reyes, Nico Antonio, Jeric Raval, Janice de Belen, Ria Atayde, Desiree del Valle, Raphael Robles, Giselle Sanchez, Sammie Rimando
404–413	"Ikaw Ang GHOSTo Ko"	July 22, 2018
404–413	"Ikaw Ang GHOSTo Ko"	September 23, 2018
Espie (Maymay Entrata) pretends to be a fortune teller after she's getting into an accident when her life has been change until she has psychic abilities like her father; Pidiong (Jojit Lorenzo) when she finds out she has a third eye that she's given the ability to talk to the dead people and even her dead father. She helps her crush, who was disembodied ghost, and one of the goons who actually died to uncover the mystery upon the former's life. Cast: Maymay Entrata, Edward Barber, Patrick Quiroz, Jojit Lorenzo, Wilma Doesnt, Neil Coleta, Luis Hontiveros, Hannah Ledesma, Claire Ruiz, Josh Ivan Morales, Clarence Delgado, Hap Rice, Noel Colet
414–419	"ManiKEN ni Monica"	September 30, 2018
414–419	"ManiKEN ni Monica"	November 4, 2018
Ken, a fat and heavily birthmarked man got more than he wished for because the same man who gave him handsome face cursed him that he will turn into a mannequin at day. Monica, an ugly nerd woman fell in love with Yoshi, the campus crush, but was discouraged. It is up to Ken to help Monica get her self-confidence and her to lift his curse. In the end, he realized that loving one's self outbalanced all other loves. He returns to the shop and reverts to his former self and helped the new couple go stronger. Cast: Jerome Ponce, Vivoree Esclito, CK Kieron, Dennis Padilla, Malou Crisologo, Tess Antonio, Benj Manalo, Markus Paterson, Patty Mendoza, Ashley Colet, Onyok Pineda, Kenken Nuyad
420–430	"Switch Be With You"	November 11, 2018
420–430	"Switch Be With You"	January 20, 2019
Pia, a vain narcissist works as a car sales agent, while Upeng is an ugly woman but kind and has a sweet voice was struck by lightning on the same place and switched their bodies. It's up to them to undo the curse, but must switch their lifestyle to do that. They both realized how precious moments with their families are. Cast: Barbie Imperial, Chai Fonacier, Cherry Pie Picache, Toby Alejar, Richard Manabat, Viveika Ravanes, Zeppi Borromeo, Pamu Pamorada, Marc Acueza, Kenzo Gutierrez, Patrick Suigi, Jai Agpangan, Joj Agpangan, Rayt Carreon, Jay Gonzaga, Xia Vigor, Arlene Muhlach, Chokoleit, Arhia Faye Agas
431–441	"Mr. CUTEpido"	January 27, 2019
431–441	"Mr. CUTEpido"	April 7, 2019
A womanizer and ambitious DJ accidentally injures a Cupid, and said cupid's guardian angel forced him to act as the cupid while the real one was recuperating while his partner on his show helps him find couples in order to meet their true loves. Cast: McCoy de Leon, Heaven Peralejo, Smokey Manaloto, Precious Lara Quigaman, Cris Villanueva, Reneé Dominique, Myrtle Sarrosa, Mark Neumann, Jayden Villegas, Yñigo Delen, Sofia Andres, Arthur Acuña, Regine Tolentino, Ria Atayde, Jairus Aquino, Kira Balinger, Yves Flores, Marc Santiago, Yesha Camile, Stacey Gabriel
