= Jologs =

- The original DVD cover.
- Directed by: Gilbert Perez
- Screenplay by: Ned Trespeces
- Produced by: Charo Santos-Concio; Malou Santos; Maricel V. Samson
- Starring: Diether Ocampo; Patrick Garcia; Vhong Navarro; Assunta de Rossi; John Prats; Jodi Sta. Maria; Baron Geisler; Dominic Ochoa; Onemig Bondoc; Julia Clarete; Michelle Bayle
- Cinematography: Miguel V. Fabulous III
- Edited by: Vito Cajili
- Music by: Jesse Lucas
- Production company: Star Cinema
- Distributed by: Star Cinema
- Release date: August 28, 2002
- Running time: 110 minutes
- Country: Philippines
- Language: Filipino
- Box office: ₱74 million

Jologs is a 2002 Filipino teen comedy-drama film directed by Gilbert Perez from a screenplay written by Ned Trespeces. With the film's title being a Filipino pejorative that is used to describe a tawdry person who belongs to the lower class, the film features an ensemble cast: Diether Ocampo, Patrick Garcia, Vhong Navarro, Assunta de Rossi, John Prats, Jodi Sta. Maria, Baron Geisler, Dominic Ochoa, Onemig Bondoc, Julia Clarete, and Michelle Bayle, and cameo appearances from well-known stars and personalities.

Produced and distributed by Star Cinema, the film was released theatrically on August 28, 2002.

== Plot ==
The first character shown is Ruben. A college student, his job at Barako Café, owned by Trigger, is not nearly enough to pay his tuition. Having lost his scholarship on a technicality, Ruben resorts to burglary at his father's house to cover his educational expenses. What ensues is a comedic, overly choreographed fight scene complete with wirework and overdone martial arts action.

Shona (Michelle Bayle) leaves her daughter and her boyfriend, Mando, to return to work in Japan as an exotic dancer. Her predicament exemplifies the situation of every Filipino person who has come to the realization that life in the Philippines often does not allow the working person to earn enough money to save for a better living.

Cher is a drag queen who, because of her sexuality, becomes the victim of violent homophobic aggression. His performance, while exaggeratedly comic, touches on the ugliness of homophobia and sexual discrimination. And yet the issue is never resolved, because Cher’s attackers are not punished for their hate crime. Neither is Shona condemned for abandoning her child in this instance of labor export from the Philippines, and the effects that it has on the people who must be left behind. Ruben’s moral and practical dilemma remains unresolved as well.

The lives of three couples: Iza and Iñigo, Kulas and Joan, and Dino and Faith deal with objectification, unrequited love, and first sexual experiences, respectively.

== Cast ==
=== Main roles ===
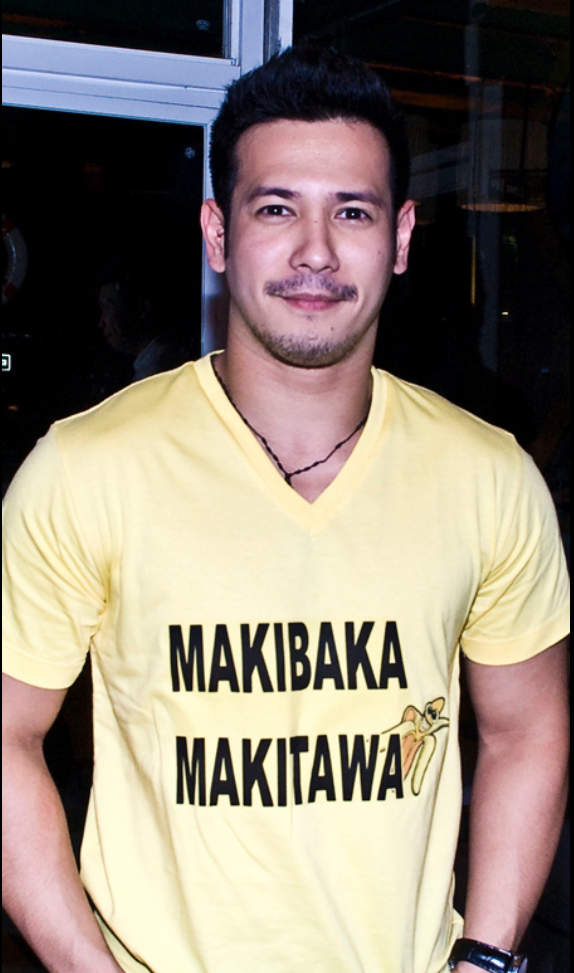
John Prats portrays Ruben.

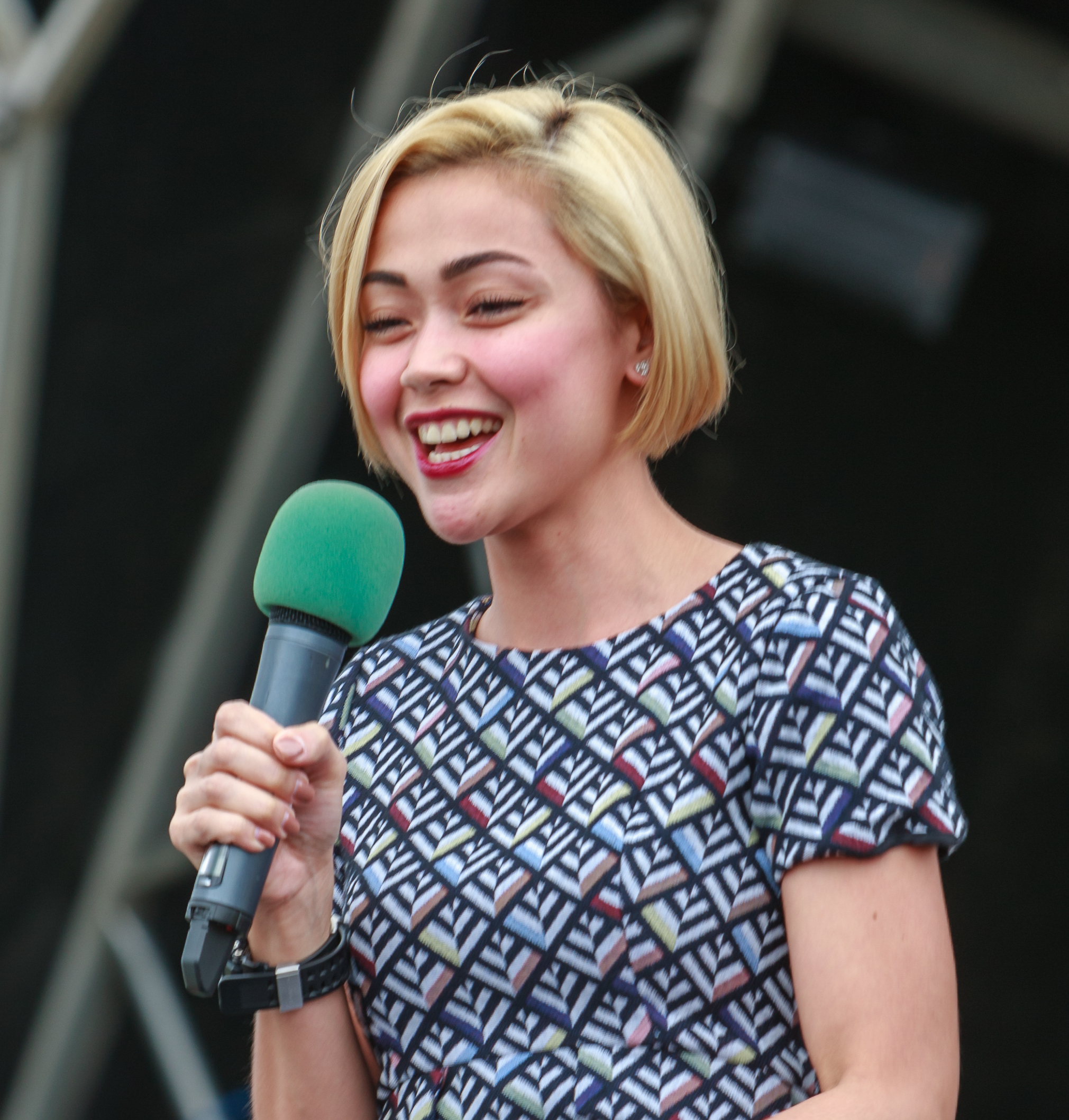
Jodi Sta. Maria portrays Faith.

- Diether Ocampo as Mando
- Patrick Garcia as Dino
- Vhong Navarro as Kulas
- Onemig Bondoc as Trigger
- Dominic Ochoa as Iñigo
- John Prats as Ruben
- Jodi Sta. Maria as Faith
- Julia Clarete as Joan
- Baron Geisler as Cher
- Michelle Bayle as Shona
- Assunta De Rossi as Iza

=== Supporting roles ===
- Matt Ranillo III as Mr. Morales
- Jean Saburit as Mrs. Morales
- Maribeth Bichara as Mrs. Chavez
- Bentong as Juanito
- Nikki Valdez as Iza's friend
- Denise Joaquin as Iza's friend
- Sean Ignacio as Bryan
- Farrah Florer as Violeta
- Perla Bautista as Ruben's grandmother

=== Cameos ===
- Kris Aquino as herself
- Robert Joshua Danao as the Taekwondo master
- Bobet Vidanes as the Game KNB? contestant
- Judy Ann Santos as a customer of Barako Cafe
- Piolo Pascual as a customer of Barako Cafe
- Camille Prats as pedestrian
- Heart Evangelista as a pedestrian
- Angelica Panganiban as the girl carrying Dino's birthday cake
- Leandro Muñoz as the airport official
- Gabe Mercado as the Pastor
- Carlo Muñoz as the taxi driver
- Christian Vasquez as Joan's boyfriend
- Regine Tolentino as the restaurant waitress
- Justin Cuyugan as a bus conductor
- Bearwin Meily as the village guard
- Hyubs Azarcon as the village guard
- Andrea Del Rosario as the student assistant
- Minnie Aguilar as the guidance counselor
- Carlo Aquino as Dino's birthday guest
- Janus del Prado as birthday guest
- Nicole Anderson as birthday guest
- Sarah Christophers as birthday guest
- Kristopher Peralta as frat-man
- Don Laurel as frat-man
- Lui Villaruz as Barako Cafe security guard
- Stage crew as KTV customers

== Production ==
=== Development ===
The script for the film was selected for the top prize at the first annual Star Cinema Scriptwriting Contest.

=== Post-Production ===
The majority of the visual effects were handled by Roadrunner Network, Inc. The titles were handled by Cinemagic. The films were printed by LVN Pictures.

== Soundtrack ==
The original film score was composed and conducted by Jesse Lucas.

Jologs: Original Motion Picture Soundtrack is the official soundtrack album of the film published by Star Records. The soundtrack features songs from well-known Filipino artists, including Roselle Nava, Gloc-9, and Piolo Pascual. The theme song entitled "Next In Line" was originally sung by Wency Cornejo of the band AfterImage. It was re-recorded specifically for the film by the band Stagecrew. Another track from the film is the song "Jologs," performed by the rapper Gloc-9.

== Release ==
=== Home media ===
The Region-3 DVD of the film was released on January 17, 2006, by Star Home Video.

=== Recognitions ===
==== 2003 Gawad Urian Awards ====
- Nominated Best Actor for Vhong Navarro
- Nominated Best Editing for Vito Cajili
- Nominated Best Music for Jesse Lucas
- Nominated Best Screenplay for Ned Trespeces
