= Tabing Ilog =

Philippine television drama series

- Title card
- Genre: Teen drama
- Written by: Wali Ching; Jake Tordesillas; Delfin Ilao
- Directed by: Malu L. Sevilla; Rechie del Carmen; Gilbert Perez
- Starring: Kaye Abad; Paolo Contis; John Lloyd Cruz; Desiree del Valle; Patrick Garcia; Baron Geisler; Paula Peralejo; Jodi Sta. Maria
- Theme music composer: Barbie Almalbis; Rommel dela Cruz
- Opening theme: "Tabing Ilog" by Barbie's Cradle
- Country of origin: Philippines
- Original language: Filipino
- No. of episodes: 241

Production
- Executive producers: Judith C. Bauer; Annaliza A. Goma; Raymund Dizon; Desirey Fernandez; Nini Matilac
- Running time: 45–90 minutes
- Production company: ABS-CBN Studios

Original release
- Network: ABS-CBN
- Release: March 14, 1999 – October 19, 2003

Tabing Ilog (transl. riverside) is a Philippine television drama series broadcast by ABS-CBN. Directed by Malu L. Sevilla, it stars Kaye Abad, Paolo Contis, John Lloyd Cruz, Desiree del Valle, Patrick Garcia, Baron Geisler, Paula Peralejo and Jodi Sta. Maria. It premiered on March 14, 1999 on the network's Sunday afternoon line up. The show concluded on October 19, 2003, with a total of 241 episodes.

== Premise ==
The series focuses on the friendship of best friends Eds, Badong, Rovic, Corrinne, James, Fonzy, Anne, and George.

== Cast and characters ==
Cast

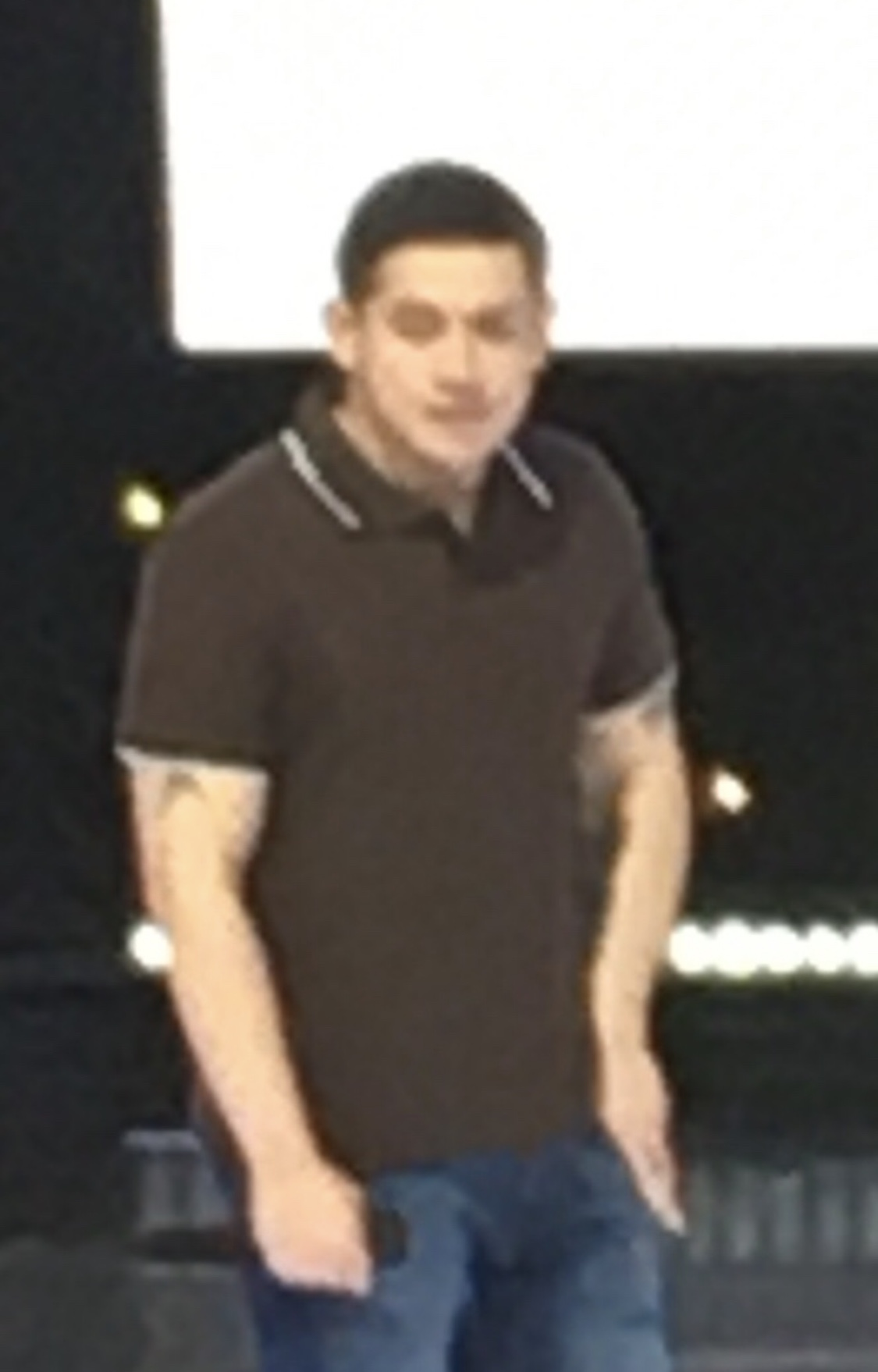
Paolo Contis

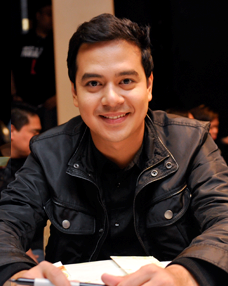
John Lloyd Cruz

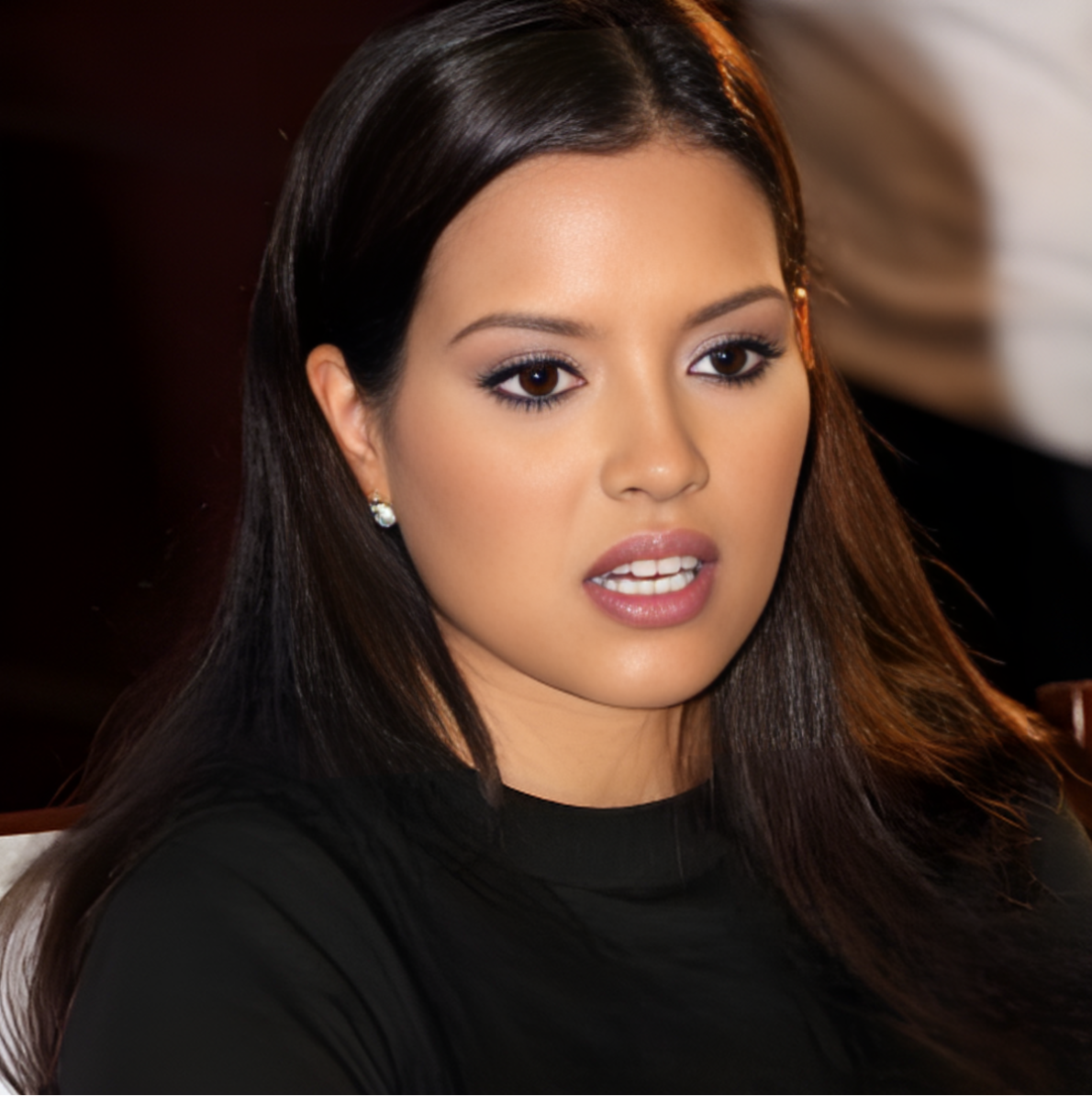
Desiree del Valle

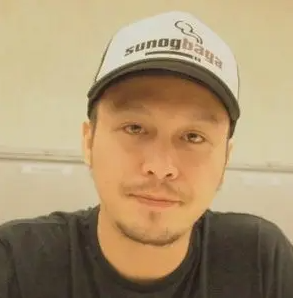
Baron Geisler

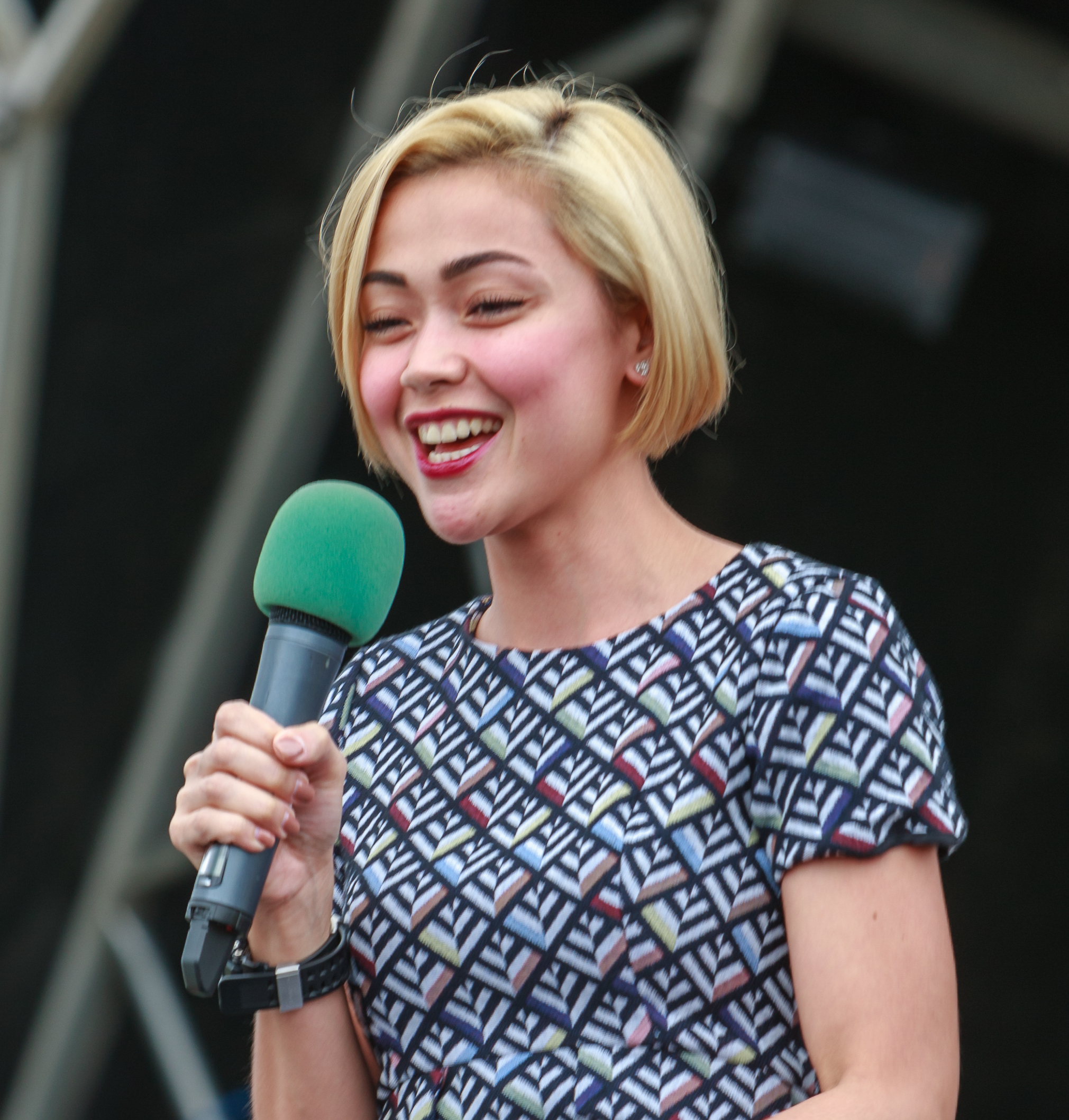
Jodi Sta. Maria

Main cast

- Kaye Abad as Epifania "Eds/Ponyang" delos Santos
- Paolo Contis as Salvador "Badong" Magtibay
- John Lloyd Cruz as Rolando Victor "Rovic" Mercado
- Desiree del Valle as Corrinne Ledesma
- Patrick Garcia as Jaime "James" Collantes
- Baron Geisler as Alfonso "Fonzy" Ledesma
- Paula Peralejo as Angela "Anne" de Guzman
- Jodi Sta. Maria as Georgina "George" Fuentebella

Supporting cast

- Trina Zuñiga as Megan / Cecilia dela Rhea
- Carol Banawa as Andrea/"Andoy"
- Camille Prats as Natasha
- Juddha Paolo as Roy
- Angelene Aguilar as Patpi "Pat P"
- Paolo Paraiso as Dodge
- Maoui David as Hillary
- Brian Tan as Jiggs
- Caridad Sanchez as Lola Juling (Rovic's grandmother)
- Mylene Dizon as Jennifer "Jerry" Ricafort
- Ian Galliguez as Sabrina
- Pen Medina as Epifanio "Panyong" delos Santos (Eds's father)
- Angel Aquino as Tita Pia Fuentebella (George's stepmother)
- Mat Ranillo III as Carlos Fuentebella (George's father)
- Susan Africa as Esperanza "Esper" Magtibay (Badong's mother)

Recurring/extended cast

- Daria Ramirez as Azon delos Santos (Eds's mother)
- Miko Palanca as Perry Sanchez
- Rafael Rosell IV as Oliver McFuller
- Leandro Muñoz as Francisco "Fran" Ledesma Jr. (Fonzy and Corrinne's half-brother)
- Julia Clarete as Cynthia "Pinky" Ledesma (Fonzy and Corrinne's half-sister)
- Gio Alvarez as Roberto "Boyet" delos Santos
- Janette McBride as Fair
- Lito Legaspi as Francisco Ledesma (Fonzy and Corrine's father)
- Jean Saburit as Chedeng Ledesma (Fonzy and Corrinne's mother)
- Mia Gutierrez as Claudia (Rovic's mother)
- Emman Abeleda as Mario Magtibay (Badong's younger brother) and as young Badong
- Mel Kimura as Ms. Castro
- Ogie Diaz as Ige
- Kathleen Hermosa as Fonzy and George's high school classmate

Guest cast

- Rica Peralejo as Shiela de Guzman (Anne's older sister)
- Dimples Romana as Jacqueline "Jackie" Cuevas
- Dennis Trillo as Ferdinand "Nanding" McFuller
- Dan Fernandez as Tito Jun (Rovic's stepfather)
- Beth Tamayo as Sonia / Irma
- Al Tantay as Renato de Guzman (Anne's father)
- Marianne dela Riva as Belen de Guzman (Anne's mother)
- Efren Reyes Jr. as Tonyo Magtibay (Badong's father)
- Anna Marin as Elvira "Elvie" Collantes (James's mother)
- Juan Rodrigo as Manuel Collantes (James's father)
- Julie Ann Fortich as Racquel (George's mother)
- Anna Larrucea as Abigail/"Gail"
- Eugene Domingo as Judith "JB" Bradley (Badong and Corrinne's drama class professor)
- Alwyn Uytingco as young Rovic
- Nica Peralejo as young George
- Hazel Ann Mendoza as young Eds
- John Wayne Sace as young James
- Gerard Pizzaras as Marcelino "Marcy" Hernandez
- Romaro Salcedo as Ryan Cervantes
- Joel Gatchalian as Chuck/Chuckie
- Richard Quan as basketball coach
- Carlo Muñoz as Frat Master Vince
- Katrina de Leon as Darian
- Don Laurel as Dexter
- Randolph Ranay as Chichi
- Justin Cuyugan as Jay Rodriguez
- Tracy Vergel as Therese "Terry" de Jesus
- Ama Quiambao as Sister Ramona
- Ruel Vernal as Enrique "Bungo" Mercado (Rovic's father)
- Lui Villaruz as Robert Edward "Red/Berto/Bob" Domingo
- Denise Joaquin as Frankie
- Christopher Roxas as Chito Cuevas (Jackie's brother)
- Celine Lirio as Sidney Cuevas (Jackie's sister)
- Roselle Nava as Kelly
- Gino Paul Guzman as Mike
- Anthony Santos as Dong
- Chi Atienza as Tintin
- Matet de Leon as Honey
- Marvin Agustin as Allen
- Andrea del Rosario as Isabel
- Gerald Madrid as Kenneth/Ken
- Antonette Garcia as Sonia's cousin
- Luz Fernandez as Tyang Luisa (Kelly's auntie)
- Nikki Valdez as Luchi
- Cheska Garcia as Jo
- Ced Torrecarion as Butch
- JC Castro as Joanna
- Uchie Sison as Sandra (Marcy's wife)
- Kier Legaspi as Arthur
- Nicole Hofer as Belinda
- Christian Santino as Selmo
- Victor Neri as Badong's friend
- Mia Gutierrez as Claudia
- Michelle Bayle as Vicky
- Zeppi Borromeo
- Encar Benedicto as Ken's mother
- Errol Dionisio as Lolo Pidyong
- Lola Ima as Juling's sister
- Mark Solis as Lester / Iceman
- Sirk Cortes as Danica
- Pascal Greco as Andrei
- Nina Mercado as Abby de Leon
- Alvin Aguilar as Fonzy's PE instructor
- Djohanna Rios as Pauline
- Dominque Laurel as Rachel
- Nico Garcia as Tyler
- Aurora Halili as Adela
- Jennifer Sevilla as Marge (Oliver's stepsister)
- Alloy Naronia as Abby and Santi's father
- Kristopher Peralta as Santi de Leon
- Marvin Ramales as Elmer
- Norman Hernandez as Maynard
- Kalila Aguilos as Francesca Rei "Frankie/FRV" Villaruiz
- Gem Ramos as Allelou Madridejos
- Raye Baquirin as Roxanne
- Teresa Paron as Tessa "TJ" Jacinto
- LA Mumar as Jose Miguel "JM" Madridejos
- Daniella Havran as Cassandra
- Cesar Xeres Burgos as JM's father
- Fame Delos Santos as JM's aunt
- Lui Manansala as JM's mother
- Jane Zaleta
- Amy Robles as Lorrea Cornelia "Nelia" Ducut
- Lalaine Degala as Nenita Ducut
- JC Castro as Manolito
- Phillip Lazaro as Queenie
- Augusto Victa as Dolfo
- Brian Martin as William
- Lora Luna
- Monina Bagatsing
- Michael Yuseco
- Mike George
- Jayvee Binay
- Apreal Tolentino as Apreal
- Steven Alonzo
- Cherry Lou as Melissa
- Michelle Suzara
- Abby Rivera
- Rodney Shattara
- Onemig Bondoc as Toby
- Janus Del Prado as Donald Mac
- Yuuki Kadoka as Judiel (James's adopted son)
- Angel Jacob
- Rallion Alonzo as Sir Lawrence Flores (Eds's Practicum Adviser)
- Chiqui Del Carmen
- Maricar Fernandez as Rosalie
- Jordan Herrera as Kenji
- William Lorenzo
- Aiza Marquez as Maxine
- Jennylyn Mercado as Julia
- Michelle Esteves
- Buddy Palad as Kuyang (Mameng's brother and Allen's uncle)
- Lloyd Zaragosa
- Olga Natividad as Mitchie
- Gudo Pascual
- Liberty Lometillo
- Lou Veloso
- Sylvia Sanchez as Mameng (Allen's mother)
- Paolo Rivero as Archie

== Production ==
The series was primarily shot in Pagsanjan, Laguna.

== Reception ==
The series was critically well-received and was dubbed by its audience as the Filipino version of the hit American TV series Dawson's Creek.

== Adaptations ==
A musical version of the series was staged by the Philippine Educational Theater Association in 2023 and 2024.

== Accolades ==
Accolades received by Tabing Ilog
| Year | Award | Category | Recipient | Result | Ref. |
|---|---|---|---|---|---|
| 2000 | 14th PMPC Star Awards for Television | Best Youth-Oriented Program | Tabing Ilog | Won | |
| 2001 | 15th PMPC Star Awards for Television | Best Youth-Oriented Program | Tabing Ilog | Won | |
