= 2019 Taytay, Rizal, local elections =

Philippine election

2019 Taytay mayoral election
← 2016	May 13, 2019	2022 →
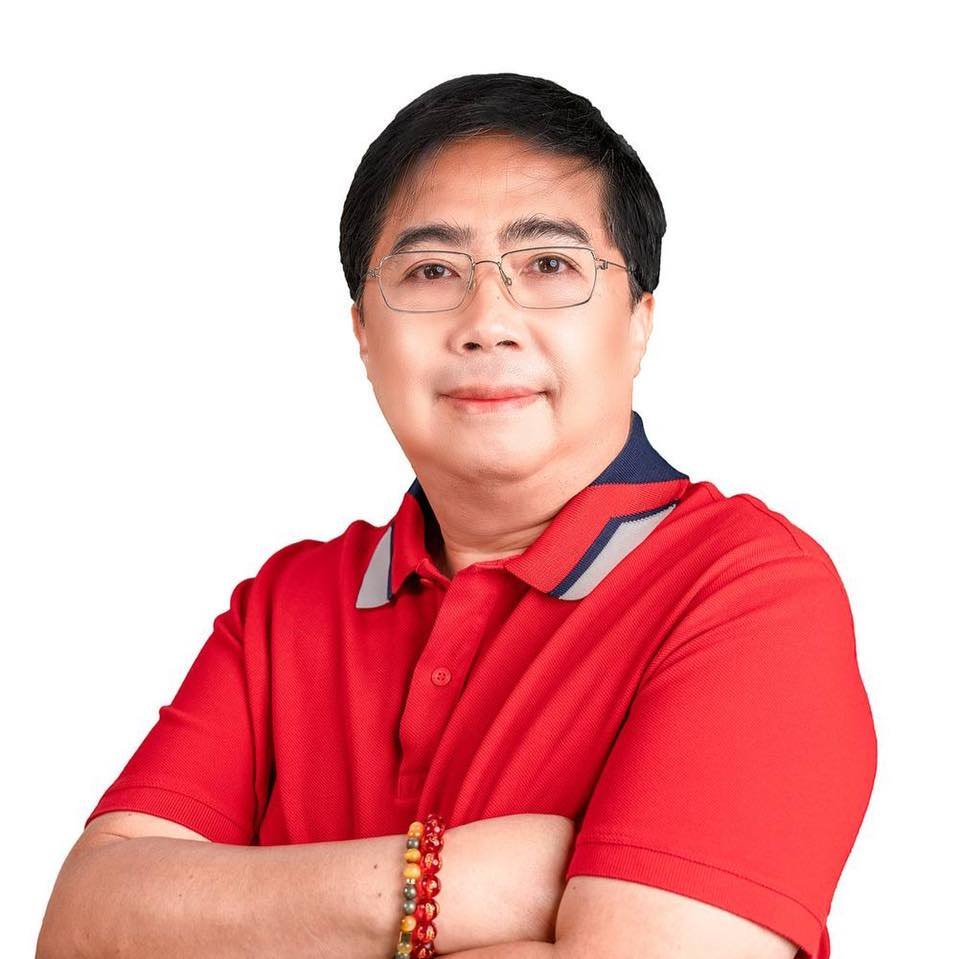
		NPC	PFP
Nominee	George Ricardo Gacula	Carlito Gonzaga	Asem Ram
Party	Nacionalista	NPC	PFP
Running mate	Michell Bermudo	Jan Victor Cabitac	Rommel Batac
Popular vote	61,468	42,125	886
Percentage	58.83	40.32	0.85
Mayor before election
George Ricardo Gacula
Liberal
Elected mayor
George Ricardo Gacula
Nacionalista

Taytay held its local elections on Monday, May 13, 2019, as a part of the 2019 Philippine general election. Voters elected candidates for the local elective posts in the municipality: the mayor, the vice mayor, the congressmen and the provincial board member of Rizal's 1st district, and the eight councilors.

There are a total of 107,520 people who voted out of the 153,664 registered voters. George Ricardo Gacula won the mayoral race for the 2nd consecutive time over incumbent vice mayor Carlito "Bonoy" Gonzaga. Michell Bermudo won the vice mayoral race over Jan Victor Cabitac, both who are incumbent councilors.

== Mayoral and Vice Mayoral elections ==
=== Mayor ===
Taytay mayoral election
Party	Candidate	Votes	%
Nacionalista	George Ricardo "Joric" Gacula	61,468	58.83
NPC	Carlito "Bonoy" Gonzaga	42,125	40.32
PFP	Aser Ram	886	0.85
Total votes		104,479	100.00

=== Vice Mayor ===
Taytay vice mayoral election
Party	Candidate	Votes	%
Nacionalista	Michell Bermudo	53,917	53.55
NPC	Jan Victor "JV" Cabitac	45,606	45.29
PFP	Rommel Batac	1,168	1.16
Total votes		100,961	100.00

== City Council ==
=== By ticket ===
==== Development Team ====
NP/Development Team
Name	Party
Patrick Alcantara	Nacionalista
Sophia Cabral	Nacionalista
Joan Calderon	Nacionalista
Kyle Gacula	Nacionalista
Elaine "Boknay" Leonardo	Nacionalista
Erwin "Bearwin" Meily	Nacionalista
Cerefino "Gene" Ressureccion Jr.	Nacionalista
Ma. Jeca Villanueva	Nacionalista

==== Barkadahang Taytay ====
NPC/PDP-Laban/Barkadahang Taytay
Name	Party
Jerry Calderon	NPC
Jaime Cruz	PDP–Laban
Philip Jeison "Papoo" Cruz	NPC
Tobit Cruz	NPC
Dianne Esguerra	PDP–Laban
Juvi Habacon	PDP–Laban
Sharon Macabebe	NPC
Ryan Tolentino	PDP–Laban

==== Team Ram ====
PFP/Team Ram
Name	Party
Eulalio Alemania	PFP
Roselio "Jun" Armenta	PFP
Marianito Dacuba	PFP
Mariano Derramas	PFP
Jay Gozum	PFP
Serafin Mangaspar	Independent
Delfin Medina	PFP
Roxanne Ram	PFP

=== By Name ===
Taytay Council Election
Party	Candidate	Votes	%
Nacionalista	Sophia Cabral	61,616	8.62
Nacionalista	Ma. Jeca Villanueva	56,808	7.94
Nacionalista	Patrick Alcantara	56,479	7.90
Nacionalista	Joan Calderon	54,672	7.64
Nacionalista	Ceferino "Gene" Ressureccion Jr.	54,498	7.62
Nacionalista	Kyle Gacula	52,263	7.31
Nacionalista	Elaine "Boknay" Leonardo	48,962	6.85
NPC	Philip Jeison "Papoo" Cruz	47,210	6.60
Nacionalista	Erwin "Bearwin" Meily	43,292	6.05
NPC	Sharon Macabebe	39,842	5.57
NPC	Jerry Calderon	32,416	4.53
NPC	Tobit Cruz	31,662	4.43
PDP–Laban	Dianne Esguerra	31,386	4.39
PDP–Laban	Ryan Tolentino	27,521	3.85
PDP–Laban	Juvi Habacon	25,502	3.57
PDP–Laban	Jaime Cruz	22,162	3.10
PFP	Roxanne Ram	5,241	0.73
PFP	Jay Gozum	4,129	0.58
Independent	Jose Bombita	3,591	0.50
PFP	Delfin Medina	3,507	0.49
PFP	Eulalio Alemania	3,109	0.43
PFP	Roselio "Jun" Armenta	2,728	0.38
Independent	Serafin Mangaspar	2,516	0.35
PFP	Marianito Dacuba	2,220	0.31
PFP	Mariano Derramas	1,866	0.26
Total votes		715,198	100.00
