= Mark Meily =

Filipino film maker

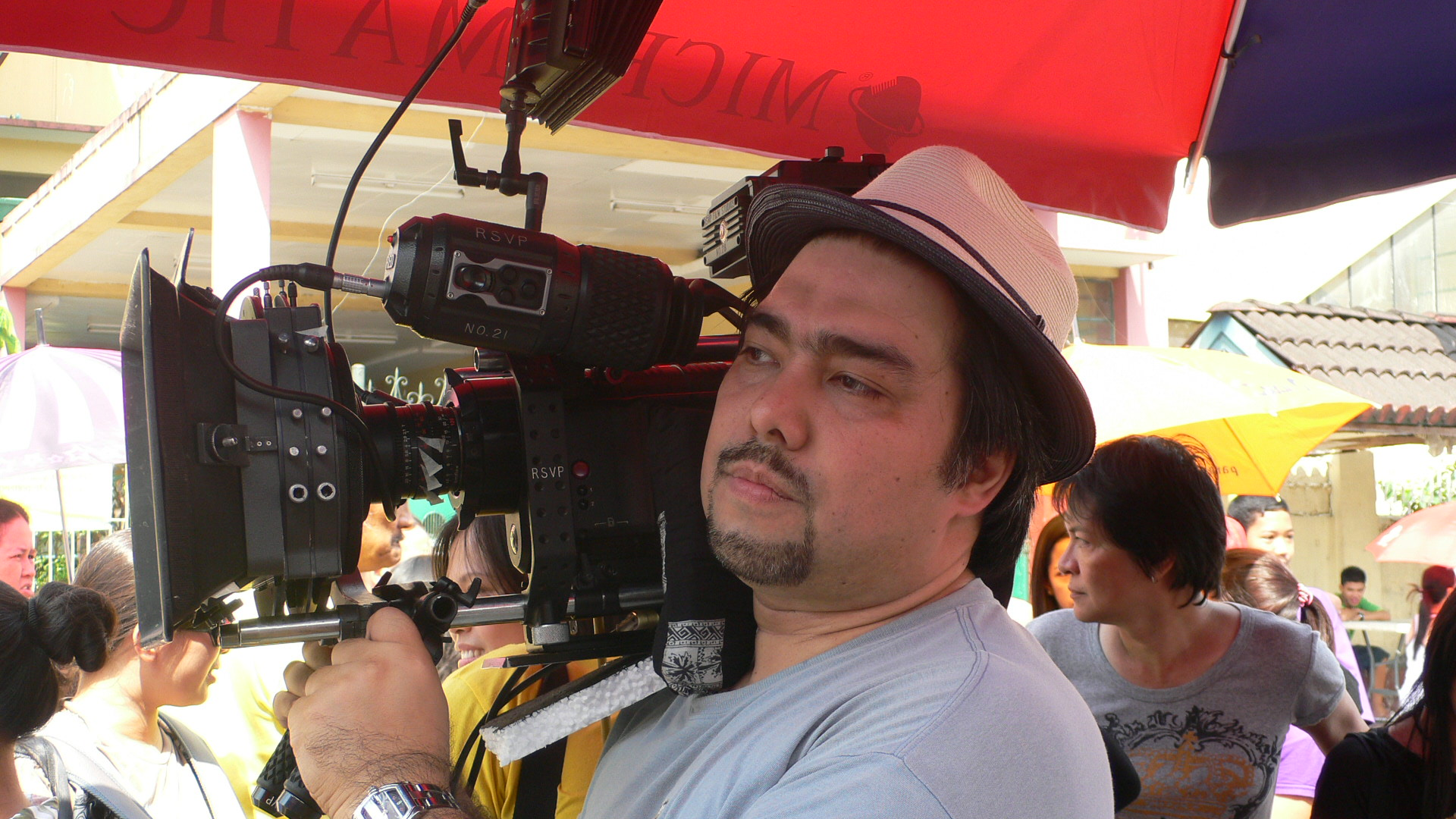
- Born: Edward Mark Afable Meily; August 18, 1967 (age 58); Manila, Philippines
- Education: University of the Philippines Diliman; Mowelfund Film Institute; École supérieure d'études cinématographiques
- Occupation(s): Film director, TV commercial director
- Years active: 1991–present
- Notable work: 2003 - Crying Ladies; 2005 - La Visa Loca; 2007 - Camera Café; 2008 - Baler; 2010 - Donor; 2012 - El Presidente
- Spouse: Videlle Briones-Meily
- Children: 4

Mark A. Meily is a film director, producer and a film educator who started his career in the Philippines. He has directed campaigns for Procter & Gamble, Colgate-Palmolive, Coca-Cola, DocuSign, and FICO. His feature films have been presented at the film festivals of Deauville, Hawaii, Seattle, Goteborg, Marrakech, Montreal, Busan, Fukuoka and Brussels.

He was the chair of the Filmmaking program of the De La Salle-College St. Benilde in Manila. He became the Dean of the School of Design of iAcademy until 2019. In May 2019, his tenth feature, Maledicto, the first film produced by Fox International in the Philippines opened in cinemas. He now lives in San Francisco, California.

== Early life ==
Meily was born in Manila. He studied at the University of the Philippines Diliman College of Fine Arts, the Mowelfund Film Institute. and at the Ecole Supérieure d'Etudes Cinématographiques as French Government Scholar.

== Personal life ==
Mark is the older brother of actor, TV host, vlogger and comedian Bearwin Meily. His wife is the cinematographer Videlle "Lee" Briones-Meily, who had won the FAMAS Award for Best Cinematography for her work on the 2000 film Tanging Yaman.

== Television ==
In 2008, Meily directed the pilot week episode of Judy Ann Santos' Habang May Buhay. He also wrote episodes and directed all six-seasons of the Asian adaptation of the hit French Sit-Com Camera Café. The series won Best Comedy Series at the Asian Television Awards in Singapore. He also worked on the hit drama series Jasmine for TV5.

For his television work, he won numerous awards such as the Catholic Mass Media Award, the Anvil Award, and the Philippine Advertising Creative Guild Prize. He received several awards from the Philippine Advertising Congress.

== Writing ==
Meily has written two screenplays, Bayad Luha and The Good Friday Archipelago, which have won prizes from the Don Carlos Palanca Memorial Foundation annual literary contest.

== Critical success ==
Meily directed Crying Ladies, his first feature film. The film won six awards at the 2003 Metro Manila Film Festival including Best Picture and Best Director. The film also received several nominations from different award-giving bodies in Philippines.

Crying Ladies premiered in the United States and has received good reviews from the New York Times, Los Angeles Times, and The Village Voice. It has also been shown at the Montreal World Film Festival, Brussels Festival of Independent Cinema, Hamburg Film Festival, Newport Beach Film Festival, Dallas Asian Film Festival, Calcutta Film Festival, and Palm Springs Film Festival.

The film received the NETPAC Award for Best Asian Film and awarded for Meily the Best Director prize at the International Film Festival of Kerala, India. It is also the Philippine entry to the Best Foreign Language Film at the Academy Awards. He directed Pasyon U.S.A. (commercial title: La Visa Loca), a film largely based on his Palanca–prize winning screenplay Good Friday Archipelago.

In December 2008, his third feature, Baler, topped the Metro Manila Film Festival garnering 11 awards and earning Meily his second Best Director trophy. Baler, a historical epic drama set during the end of the war of Independence in the Philippines, was screened later on at the Far East Film Festival in Udine and was the opening film of the Indio Bravo Film Festival at the Museum of Modern Art in New York. Meily also won another Best Director trophy at the PMPC Star Awards in 2009. In the same year, Meily was tasked to direct an animated documentary about Imelda Marcos for Imee Marcos' Creative Media and Film Society of the Philippines (CreaM), with the working title Barefoot Beauty, though it did not come to fruition.

Meily founded Spark Films, a pioneer in branded viral entertainment and together with CALT, France introduced the hit French sit-com Camera Cafe in Asia. The Asian adaptation of the series eventually won Best Comedy Program at the 2008 Asian Television Awards in Singapore.

== Awards ==
Year	Award-Giving Body	Category	Work	Result
2003	Metro Manila Film Festival	Best Director	Crying Ladies	Won
2008	Metro Manila Film Festival	Best Director	Baler	Won
