= Carlo Muñoz =

Filipino actor

- Born: 24 February 1978 (age 48); Philippines
- Occupation: Actor
- Years active: 1999–2005; 2014–present
- Spouse: Enid Reyes
- Children: 3
- Relatives: Leandro Muñoz (brother); Angelo Muñoz (brother); Tita Muñoz (aunt)

Carlo Muñoz (Tagalog pronunciation: [muˈɲos]; born 24 February 1978) is a Filipino actor.

== Early life ==
Muñoz is the middle child of Louie Muñoz and Patricia García. Muñoz's older brother is actor Leandro Muñoz. His younger brother Angelo also appeared in some TV shows in the Philippines. His father is a brother of actress Tita Muñoz.

== Career ==
While in college, Muñoz started working as a commercial model and appeared in local TV ads including Del Monte and Coca-Cola.

In 1996, he joined ABS-CBN's Talent Center and was one of the new actors introduced under Star Circle Batch 6.

Muñoz played the titular character of the "Hello, Billy" advertising campaign by PLDT. The series followed the romance of Billy and Gracia in the United States, revealed through overseas telephone conversations with his nosey mother in the Philippines, and the couple's eventual homecoming and marriage. The advertising campaign, which later expanded to radio and print, ran between 2000 and 2001.

He has played important roles such as Mark in Pangako Sa'yo an internationally acclaimed Primetime Soap Opera that lasted for two years and as the mute friend of Carol Banawa in the ensemble Primetime series of ABS-CBN Bituin

== Personal life ==
Muñoz, together with then girlfriend Enid "Meg" Reyes, older brother Leandro and Leandro's son, Frankie, moved to the United States in 2003 after the death of their father. He married Reyes in a civil wedding in California on Valentine's Day the following year—the couple first met at the set of a Wansapanataym episode—together they have 3 sons.

== Filmography ==
=== Television ===
Year	Title	Role	Notes	Source
1999	Maalaala Mo Kaya		Episode: "Friendship Band"	
1999–2000	Tabing Ilog	Vince		
2000	Star Drama Theater Presents: Rave			
2000	Wansapanataym	Popo	Episode: "Insta-Lino"	
2000	Maalaala Mo Kaya		Episode: "Rehas"	
2000	Maalaala Mo Kaya	Walter Navarro	Episode: "Scrapbook"	
2000–2002	Pangako Sa 'Yo	Mark		
2001	Maalaala Mo Kaya		Episode: "Balota"	
2001	Maalaala Mo Kaya		Episode: "Mami & Siopao"	
2002	Maalaala Mo Kaya		Episode: "Law Book"	
2002–2003	Bituin	Dante		
2002	Maalaala Mo Kaya		Episode: "Kubo"	
2016	The Story of Us	Alvin		

=== Film ===
Year	Title	Role	Notes	Source
2001	Narinig Mo Na Ba Ang L8est?	Kit		
2001	Luv Text	Pablo		
2001	Yamashita: The Tiger's Treasure	Young Carmelo		
2002	Got 2 Believe	Arnold		
2002	Jologs	Taxi driver		
2002	Dekada '70	Rene		
2003	Ngayong Nandito Ka	Kent Rodriguez		
2003	Sanib	Leandro		

== Awards and nominations ==
Year	Work	Award	Category	Result	Source
2001	Yamashita: The Tiger's Treasure	Metro Manila Film Festival	Best Supporting Actor	Nominated	
2002	Yamashita: The Tiger's Treasure	FAMAS Awards	Best Supporting Actor	Won	
2002	Yamashita: The Tiger's Treasure	Gawad Urian Award	Best Supporting Actor	Nominated	
2002	Yamashita: The Tiger's Treasure	PMPC Star Awards for Movies	New Male Star of the Year	Won	
2002	Yamashita: The Tiger's Treasure	GMMSF Box-Office Entertainment Awards	Most Promising Male Star	Won	
