= Hari ng Sablay: Isang Tama, Sampung Mali =

Hari Ng Sablay
- Directed by: Mac Alejandre
- Screenplay by: R.J. Nuevas; Wystan Dimalanta
- Produced by: Lily Y. Monteverde; Roselle Y. Monteverde
- Starring: Bearwin Meily; Rica Peralejo
- Cinematography: Rolly Manuel
- Edited by: Kelly Cruz
- Music by: Vincent de Jesus
- Production company: Regal Films
- Distributed by: Regal Entertainment
- Release date: November 30, 2005 (Philippines)
- Running time: 101 minutes
- Country: Philippines
- Languages: Filipino; English

Hari Ng Sablay (or Hari Ng Sablay: Isang Tama, Sampung Mali) is a 2005 Filipino-language Filipino comedy film directed by Mac Alejandre and starring Rica Peralejo, Bearwin Meily and Nadine Samonte. The film was referred to as a "box office hit" when earning ₱2.9 million after its nationwide release, and has been called a "heart-wrenching hit".

== Plot ==
Mars and Venus were both born on the same day when a phenomenon causes the planets to align together. So Venus and her family receive all the luck in the world while Mars' family blames him for all the miseries they experienced in life.

Mars and Venus grew up together as childhood friends but separated later on when Venus and her family migrates abroad. Mars is just so unlucky when it comes to career and love, while Venus is a successful businesswoman. When they meet again after a few years, Mars realizes later on his bad luck subsides when he is beside Venus. He later on acquires good luck when he becomes a matchmaker, making certain pairs of people fall for each other. But when he failed to match Venus with her crush Adonis who preferred Mars' crush Mindy instead, both Venus and Mars realized they were meant for one another. However, Popoy, Mars' adversary since childhood, dashes hopes of Mars ending up with Venus by courting her and eventually proposes marriage despite already being married to someone else. On the day Venus was supposed to marry Popoy, the phenomenon that happened when Mars and Venus were born reoccurred, causing planets to align together again. This caused Venus to come to her senses and call off her wedding with Popoy, who was eventually exposed by his legal wife due to his misdeeds. Mars and Venus marry, to the delight and approval of their families and friends.

== Cast ==
- Bearwin Meily as Mars
- Rica Peralejo as Venus
- Joel Torre as Rodel
- Al Tantay as Benjou
- Nova Villa as Lola Gracia
- Jay R as Adonis
- Tuesday Vargas as Maritess
- Nadine Samonte as Mindy
- Mike 'Pekto' Nacua as Bok
- Bianca King as Monica
- Dion Ignacio as Billie
- Nash Aguas as Jayjay
- Jade Lopez as Maggie
- Paolo Contis as Popoy
- Ella Guevara as Young Venus
- Chris Martin as Jojo
- Miguel Tanfelix as Young Mars
- Basty Alcances as Young Popoy
- Renz Joyce Juan as Young Maritess
- Jorel Tan as Siokoy
- Renee Summer as Kampanerang Kuba
- Krizzy Jareno as Krizzy
- Carlito Campos as Mike Enriquez
- Paolo Paraiso as Greg
- Pinky Marquez as Manang
- J.R. Valentin as Dennis
- Harvey Diez as Chinese Businessman
