= Susan Africa =

Filipino actress (b. 1959)

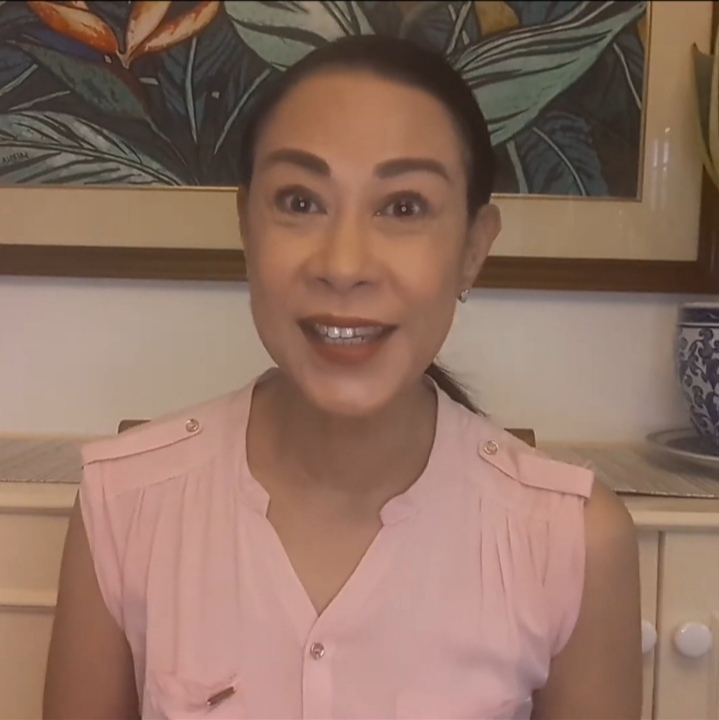
- Africa in 2020
- Born: August 20, 1959 (age 66); Philippines
- Education: University of Santo Tomas (BFA)
- Occupations: Actress; writer; painter; beauty queen; television host
- Years active: 1975–present
- Known for: Olongapo... The Great American Dream (1987); Mara Clara (1992); A Lullaby to the Sorrowful Mystery (2016); Kadenang Ginto (2018)
- Height: 1.7 m (5 ft 7 in)
- Spouse: Spanky Manikan (m. 1989; died 2018)
- Children: 3

Susan Africa (born August 20, 1959) is a Filipino screen and stage actress, writer, painter, beauty queen and former television host with a career spanning four decades. After placing first runner-up at the 1980 Binibining Pilipinas pageant, she pursued a career in showbusiness. A prominent figure in soap operas, she rose to fame in the television series Mara Clara (1992) and is noted for playing impoverished maternal characters. She won Best Supporting Actress at the 1987 Metro Manila Film Festival for her portrayal in Olongapo... The Great American Dream and has been involved in several international productions such as Noriega: God's Favorite (2000), Blood Surf (2000) and Under Heavy Fire (2001).

Africa also served as the host of PTV4's For Art’s Sake (1989) and Sesame (1984). Among her acclaimed performances include Hele sa Hiwagang Hapis (2016) which competed at the Berlin International Film Festival and earned praises from Meryl Streep. She served as the Corporate Development Director of Ballet Philippines Foundation for 14 years and associate director of Alumni Relations at Asian Institute of Management (AIM). Her other memorable roles include Manang Esther in Kadenang Ginto (2018) and Nita Dimaculangan in Batang Quiapo (2023).

== Career ==
=== Beginnings ===
Africa studied Fine Arts and Advertising where she graduated cum laude at the University of Santo Tomas. She became involved in acting after joining an actors' workshop at the behest of her aunt Odette Marquez, a film producer, who thought that it would help Africa overcome her shyness. As a young actress, Africa's mentors were Joel Lamangan and Soxie Topacio. She started in the theater in a production of General Goyo (1979) for Bulwagang Gantimpala (now Gantimpala Theater Foundation). Her other plays for Gantimpala include Kanser, Bien Aligtad, Biyaheng Timog, Bongbong at Kris. She has also acted for Teatro Pilipino (The Importance of Being Ernest, Regina Ramos), Dramatis Personae (Antigone) and Dulaang UP (Juna Luna) and has been directed by Rolando S. Tinio, Tony Espejo, Joel Lamangan, Anton Juan and Nonon Padilla.

=== Film and television ===
She received the Best Supporting Actress at the 1987 Metro Manila Film Festival for her role as Charlie in Olongapo, The Great American Dream. She is also well known for her five-year role as Susan Davis in the long-running teleserye Mara Clara. In 2005, she transferred to rival station, GMA Network, to play a supporting role on Now and Forever: Mukha and took a television break the following year but came back in 2007 through ABS-CBN's Palimos ng Pag-ibig. Africa later did TV5 and Kapamilya shows intermittently in 2011. During 2013, she returned to GMA-7 after Huwag Ka Lang Mawawala and was seen doing Kapuso teleseryes including Prinsesa ng Buhay Ko and Ang Dalawang Mrs. Real. Africa came back to ABS-CBN in late 2014.

=== Work off camera ===
Africa worked with Ballet Philippines of the Cultural Center of the Philippines as corporate development manager/director from 1986 to 2000, and with the Asian Institute of Management (AIM) as alumni relations program manager/associate director from 2000 to 2014.

She was first runner-up in the 1980 Binibining Pilipinas beauty pageant. In 2001, Africa had her 1st one-woman show at Gallery 139 at the SM Megamall in Pasig City.

== Personal life ==
Africa is the widow of actor Spanky Manikan. She first met Manikan while acting opposite him in a production of Benjamin Pascual's General Goyo directed by Lamangan in 1979. The couple had three children together: Eli, Miguel, and Mika.

== Filmography ==
=== Film ===
Year	Title	Role
1980	Nakaw Na Pag-ibig	
1983	Hot Property	
1984	Teenage Marriage	Lynn
1985	Hinugot sa Langit	Mitchie
1987	Olongapo... The Great American Dream	Charlie
1988	Itanong Mo sa Buwan	
1989	Virginia P.	
1990	Andrea, Paano Ba ang Maging Isang Ina?	Jackylyn
1992	Nang Gabing Mamulat si Eba	
1993	Kailan Dalawa ang Mahal	
1994	The Cecilia Masagca Story: Antipolo Massacre – Jesus, Save Us!	
1994	Nag-iisang Bituin	
1995	Sa Ngalan ng Pag-ibig	Malou
1995	Sa'yo Lamang	Mylene
1995	Asero	Chayong
1996	Mara Clara: The Movie	Susan Davis
1997	Selosa	
1997	DNA	Nurse
1999	Gimik: The Reunion	Mrs. Lorenzo
2000	Biyaheng Langit	Koring
2000	Blood Surf	Melba Lofranco
2003	Magnifico	Pracing
2003	Masamang Ugat	Mercedes
2003	My First Romance	Che's mom
2004	Bcuz of U	
2006	You Are the One	Sally & Charry's Mother
2006	Ang Pamana: The Inheritance	Celia
2009	Kinatay	Socorro
2009	Tarot	Diana
2009	Biyaheng Lupa	
2010	Tingala sa Pugad	Sayong
2010	Dalaw	Milagros
2011	Bahay Bata	Rose
2016	Singing in Graveyards	Myrna
2016	A Lullaby to the Sorrowful Mystery	Hule
2018	The Hows of Us	Leonida 'Tita Lola' Antonio
2019	Sunod	Perla
2019	The Mall, the Merrier!	Aling Mae
2021	Gameboys: The Movie	Tita Myra
2025	Kontrabida Academy	Patience Teacher

=== Television / Digital Series ===
Year	Title	Role	Notes
1975—1984	Student Canteen	Co-host	
1984	Sesame!	Ate Sylvia	
1987–1989	Superstar	Co-host	
1992	Mara Clara	Susan Davis	
1999	Saan Ka Man Naroroon	Gloria	
1999	Tabing Ilog	Esperanza 'Esper' Magtibay	
2000	Noriega: God's Favorite	Adela Giroldi	Television film
2002	Sa Dulo ng Walang Hanggan	Christina Tiongson	
2003	It Might Be You	Margaret	
2004	Krystala	Aleta	
2005	Now and Forever: Mukha	Leonor	
2006	Encantadia: Pag-ibig Hanggang Wakas	Adult Mashna Andorra	
2007	Sineserye Presents: Palimos ng Pag-Ibig	Tesang	
2007	Walang Kapalit	Elaine Santillian	
2008	Lobo	Savannah Blancaflor	
2008	Komiks Presents: Tiny Tony	Eden	
2009	May Bukas Pa	Isay Valera	
2010	Rubi	Pachang	
2010	Precious Hearts Romances Presents: You're Mine, Only Mine	Theresa	
2010	Precious Hearts Romances Presents: Alyna	Adela Dela Cruz-Del Carmen	
2011	Green Rose	Linda Reyes-Delgado	
2011	Babaeng Hampaslupa	Epiphania 'Epang' Mallari	
2011	Rod Santiago's The Sisters	Carlota Zialcita	
2011	Ikaw ay Pag-Ibig	Aida	
2012	Angelito: Batang Ama	Carmen Santos	
2013	Huwag Ka Lang Mawawala	Demetria Panaligan	
2013	Wansapanataym: Baby Ko ang Daddy Ko	Loring	
2013	Juan Dela Cruz	Debbie	
2013	Prinsesa ng Buhay Ko	Alicia Salazar	
2014	Ang Dalawang Mrs. Real	Salome "Umeng" Salazar	
2015	Wansapanataym: Wish Upon a Lusis	Minerva	
2015	All of Me	Maria 'Lola Aya' Sebastian	
2015–2016	FPJ's Ang Probinsyano	Lorena	
2016	The Story of Us	Aurora Sandoval	
2017	My Dear Heart	Cathy Filomena	
2017	The Promise of Forever	Janet Trinidad / Helen Reyes	
2018–2020	Kadenang Ginto	Esther Magtira	
2022	The Broken Marriage Vow	Marina Ilustre	
2022	Maalaala Mo Kaya: "Kakanin" and "Ring Light"	Criselda Lopez-Cabantog	
2023–2025	Dirty Linen	Pilar Onore	
2023–2025	FPJ's Batang Quiapo	Nonita "Nita" Dimaculangan	
2026	Blood vs Duty	Theresa Reyes	
TBA	Mommy Guard		

== Awards and nominations ==
Award	Year	Category	Work	Result	Ref.
Metro Manila Film Festival	1987	Best Supporting Actress	Olongapo... The Great American Dream	Won	
Young Critics Circle	2010	Best Performance	Biyaheng Lupa	Nominated	
