= Felina: Prinsesa ng mga Pusa =

- Genre: Fantasy
- Created by: ABC Development Corporation
- Written by: Benedict Mique; Ana Asuncion; Volta Delos Santos; Abi Parayno; Carlo Ventura
- Directed by: Argel Joseph
- Starring: Arci Muñoz; Ahron Villena; Leandro Muñoz; Carla Humphries
- Theme music composer: Wency Cornejo
- Opening theme: "Tulad Ko" by Morissette
- Country of origin: Philippines
- Original language: Filipino
- No. of episodes: 63

Production
- Executive producer: Jocelyn Mangilit-Tarce
- Running time: 30-45 minutes

Original release
- Network: TV5
- Release: February 27 – May 25, 2012

Felina: Prinsesa ng mga Pusa (Princess of The Cats) is a 2012 Philippine television drama series broadcast by TV5. Directed by Argel Joseph, it stars Arci Muñoz, Ahron Villena, Leandro Muñoz and Carla Humphries. It aired from February 27 to May 25, 2012. The series was originally supposed to have premiered in October 2011.

== Synopsis ==
This is the unique story of a woman who was born with cat looks/cat-like abilities. Cursed by her own father and raised by her non biological mother. Her life was filled with miseries and hardships. She had to face the painful reality that it's hard for a human-cat to seek love. This is the life experience of our latest protagonist in the world of fantasy/drama. This is the life of Felina.

== Cast and characters ==
=== Main cast ===
- Arci Muñoz as Felina / Princess
- Leandro Muñoz as Joaquin
- Ahron Villena as Yohann
- Carla Humphries as Chloe

=== Supporting cast ===
- Pilita Corrales as Madam Corziva
- Bing Loyzaga as Greta
- Jestoni Alarcon as Emilo
- Angel Jacob as Celestina
- Sharmaine Suarez as Agatha
- Racquel Montessa as Donya Regina
- Epi Quizon as Turko
- Carlos Morales as Hugo
- Bearwin Meily as Mang Porky
- CJ Jaravata as Sugar
- BJ Go as Pinggoy
- Lilia Cuntapay† as Madam Lucilla
- Gardo Versoza as Arvin
- Iwa Moto as Liza Golvez

=== Guest cast ===
- Nathaniel Britt as Cameo Role
- Francis Magundayao as Teen Joaquin
- Zymic Jaranilla as Young Joaquin
- Dexie Daulat as Young Chloe

== See also ==
- List of TV5 (Philippine TV network) original programming
