= Camera Café (Philippine TV series) =

Philippine television sitcom series

- Title card
- Genre: Sitcom
- Based on: Caméra Café (2001) by Yvan Le Bolloc'h, Bruno Solo and Alain Kappauf
- Written by: Rody Vera; Liza Magtoto; Vincent de Jesus; Rey Agapay; Jose Dennis C. Teodosio
- Directed by: Mark Meily
- Starring: Epi Quizon; Bearwin Meily
- Country of origin: Philippines
- Original language: Tagalog

Production
- Producer: Henri DeLorme
- Camera setup: Single camera setup
- Running time: 5 minutes
- Production companies: GMA Entertainment TV; Euro Asia Media Group

Original release
- Network: GMA Network; Q
- Release: April 2007 – 2009

Camera Café is a Philippine television sitcom series broadcast by GMA Network and Q. Directed by Mark Meily, it premiered in April 2007. The series concluded in 2009.

== Cast and characters ==
Cast

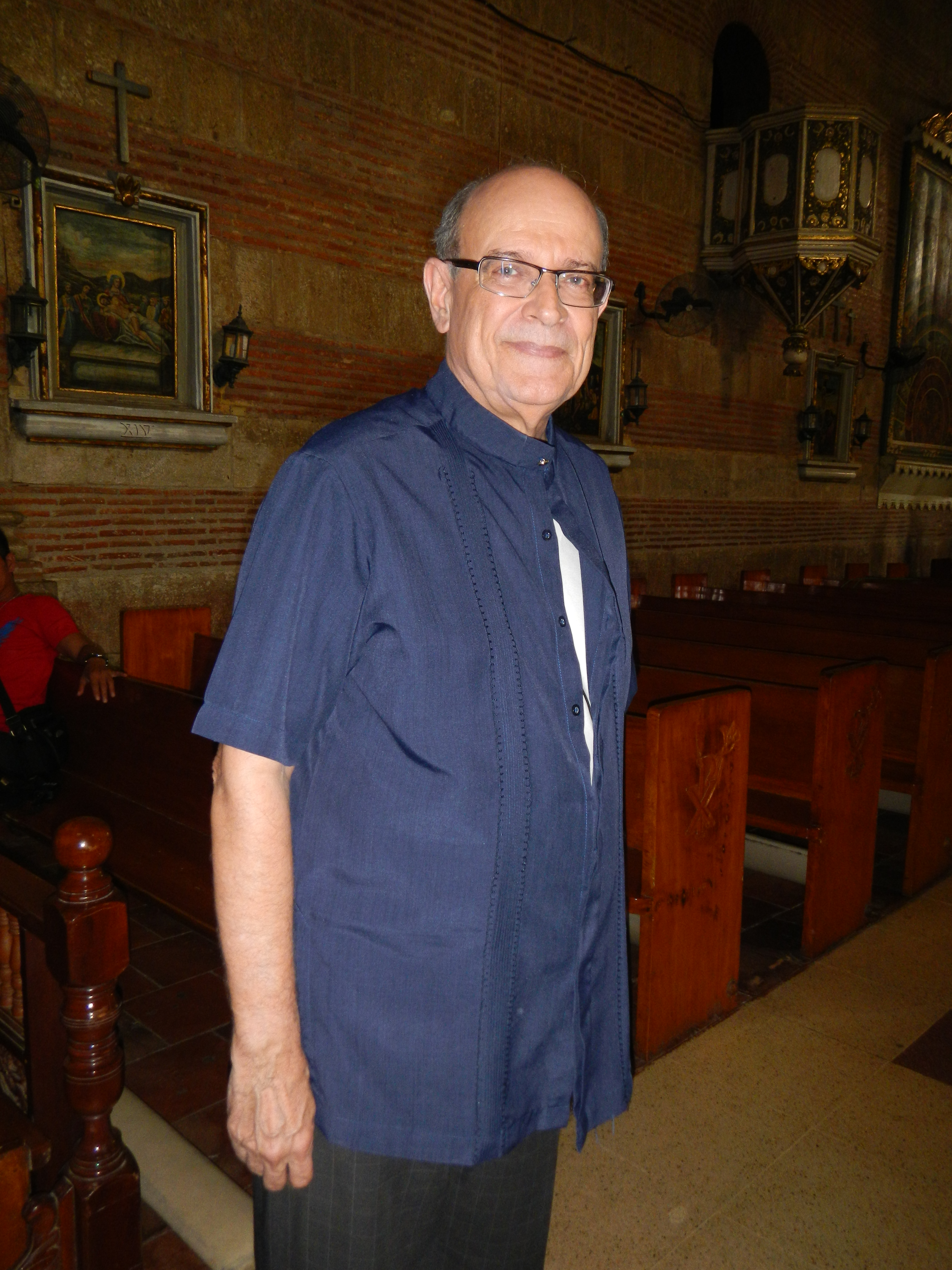
Jaime Fabregas

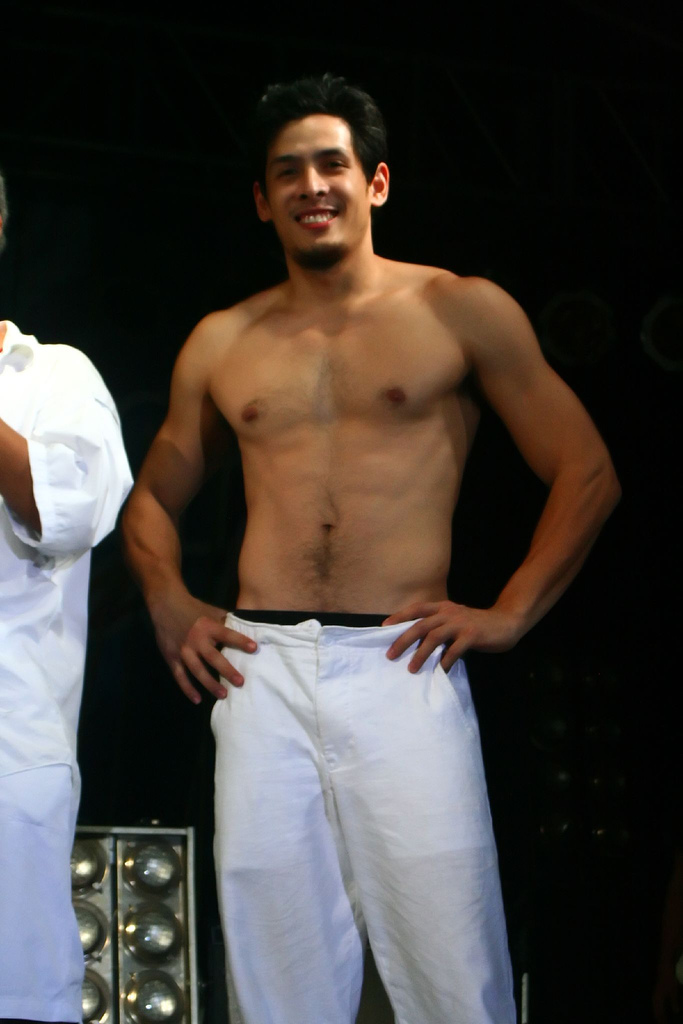
Christian Vasquez

- Epy Quizon as JC
- Bearwin Meily as Harvey
- Candy Pangilinan as Fonda
- Assunta De Rossi as Puri
- Jaime Fabregas as Boss Ric
- Christian Vasquez as Sylvio
- Kalila Aguilos as Carol
- Vincent de Jesus as Pipay
- Arnold Reyes as Vince
- Noel Colet as Serge
- Joy Viado as Joy
- LJ Reyes as Julie
- Gerhard Acao as Charm
- Wilma Doesnt as New Manang
- Patricia Ismael as Amanda
- Monica Llamas as Gina
- Jojo Alejar as JC
- Angel Aquino as Manang

== Accolades ==
Accolades received by Camera Café
Year	Award	Category	Recipient	Result	Ref.
2008	Asian TV Awards	Best Comedy Program	Camera Café	Won	
2009	Gawad Tanglaw	Best Comedy Program	Camera Café	Won	
