= The Story of Us (TV series) =

2016 Philippine television series

- Title card
- Genre: Melodrama; Romance
- Created by: ABS-CBN Studios
- Developed by: ABS-CBN Studios; Malou N. Santos; Des M. de Guzman
- Written by: Reign Loleng; Maan Dimaculangan-Fampulme
- Directed by: Richard V. Somes; Will S. Fredo; Cathy Garcia-Molina
- Starring: Kim Chiu; Xian Lim
- Music by: Francis Concio
- Opening theme: "Kailangan Kita" by Angeline Quinto
- Composer: Ogie Alcasid
- Country of origin: Philippines
- Original language: Filipino
- No. of seasons: 2
- No. of episodes: 77 (list of episodes)

Production
- Production locations: Palawan, Philippines; New York City, United States; Manila, Philippines
- Running time: 30-45 minutes
- Production company: Star Creatives

Original release
- Network: ABS-CBN
- Release: February 29 – June 17, 2016

Related
- On The Wings of Love; Born for You

The Story of Us is a 2016 Philippine television drama romantic series broadcast by ABS-CBN. Directed by Richard V. Somes, Will S. Fredo and Cathy Garcia-Molina, it stars Kim Chiu and Xian Lim. It aired on the network's Primetime Bida line up and worldwide on TFC from February 29 to June 17, 2016, replacing On the Wings of Love and was replaced by Born for You.

== Synopsis ==
Tin and Macoy are childhood friends turned lovers who grew up together in El Nido, Palawan and dreamed of a better life for them and their family. Circumstances will drive them apart as Tin goes to the United States. Separated from each other, the two are forced to work on their own, driving them further apart until their relationship crumbles.

== Cast and characters ==
=== Main cast ===
- Kim Chiu as Cristine "Tin" Manalo
  - Alyanna Angeles as young Cristine "Tin"
- Xian Lim as Ferdinand "Macoy" Sandoval Jr.
  - Zaijian Jaranilla as young Ferdinand "Macoy"

=== Supporting cast ===
- Shaina Magdayao as Lucia "Cia" Cristobal
- Princess Punzalan as Clodette Lowery
- Zsa Zsa Padilla as Myra Simbulan
- Kira Balinger as Caitlin
- Aiko Melendez as Carmy Santos-Manalo
- Susan Africa as Aurora Sandoval
- Gardo Versoza as Ferdinand "Ferdie" Sandoval Sr.
- John Arcilla as Danilo "Danny" Manalo
- Janus del Prado as Ruben "Bok" Garcia
- Nikki Valdez as Maritess Garcia
- Nonong "Bangkay" de Andres as Eddie Sandoval
- Eric Quizon as Miguel
- Leandro Muñoz as Alex
- Carlo Muñoz as Alvin
- Beth Tamayo as Stella
- Rein Gutierrez as Zach
- Mara Lopez as Teresa

=== Guest cast ===
- Eddie Gutierrez as Luis Cristobal
- Marita Zobel as Martha Cristobal
- Bryan Santos as C.J.
- Cheena Crab as Marge
- Ingrid dela Paz as Antoinette
- Rodjun Cruz as Gino
- John Vincent Servilla as Young Bok

== Ratings ==
KANTAR MEDIA NATIONAL TV RATINGS (9:30PM PST)
PILOT EPISODE	FINALE EPISODE	PEAK	SOURCE
18.2%	23.1%	23.1%	

== Awards and nominations ==
Year	Association	Category	Recipients	Result
2016	6th Eduk Circle Awards	Best Drama Actress of the Year	Kim Chiu	Won
2016	6th Eduk Circle Awards	Best Drama Actor of the Year	Xian Lim	Won
2016	30th PMPC Star Awards for Television	Best Primetime Drama Series	The Story of Us	Nominated
2016	30th PMPC Star Awards for Television	Best Drama Actress	Kim Chiu	Nominated
2016	30th PMPC Star Awards for Television	Best Drama Actor	Xian Lim	Nominated
2016	6th OFW Parangal Awards	Best Drama Actress	Kim Chiu	Won
2017	48th Box Office Entertainment Awards	TV Actress of the Year	Kim Chiu	Won

== See also ==
- List of programs broadcast by ABS-CBN
- List of ABS-CBN Studios original drama series
