= Leandro Muñoz =

Filipino actor

- Born: March 25, 1976 (age 49); Philippines
- Occupation: Actor
- Children: 2
- Relatives: Carlo Muñoz (brother); Angelo Muñoz (brother)

Leandro Muñoz (born March 25, 1976) is a Filipino actor.

Muñoz would receive world acclaim for his performance in the film Kahit Isang Saglit with actress Judy Ann Santos. He would also go on to do more films such as the adult drama Lupe: A Seaman's Wife (2003), and the film In Your Eyes in 2010. He has done projects with ABS-CBN and TV5

== Early life ==
Muñoz is the oldest child of Patricia Garcia-Muñoz and Louie Muñoz. He is the older brother of actors Carlo Muñoz and Angelo Muñoz. His father is a brother of actress Tita Muñoz.

== Personal life ==
Muñoz, together with son, Frankie, from a previous relationship and brother Carlo and Carlo's then girlfriend Enid Reyes, moved to the United States in 2003 after the death of their father.

Muñoz previously dated his Felina: Prinsesa ng mga Pusa co-star Iwa Moto and his Rod Santiago's The Sisters co-star Nadine Samonte during a brief return to acting.

Muñoz is currently married to Sheryl Espero, a nurse, and has a son named Mason. Muñoz's first son is named Frankie.

== Filmography ==
=== Film ===
Year	Title	Role	Notes	Source
1999	Isusumbong Kita Sa Tatay Ko	Kaloy		
2000	Anak	Brian		
2000	Kahit Isang Saglit	Dexter		
2002	Kung Ikaw Ay Isang Panaginip	Eric		
2002	Jologs	Airport Official		
2003	Lupe: A Seaman's Wife	Manolo		
2010	In Your Eyes	Dennis		

=== Television ===
Year	Title	Role	Notes	Source
1999	Maalaala Mo Kaya		Episode: "Forceps"	
1999	Wansapanataym	Peter	Episode: "Madyik Sandok"	
1999–2001	Saan Ka Man Naroroon	Joshua		
2000	Maalaala Mo Kaya		Episode: "Espada"	
2000–2002	Tabing Ilog	Francisco "Fran" Ledesma, Jr.		
2002–2003	Sa Dulo ng Walang Hanggan	Miguel "MJ" Crisostomo, Jr.		
2001	Wansapanataym		Episode: "Grand Ma at Pa!"	
2002	Wansapanataym	Zander	Episode: "Swapped!"	
2007	Maalaala Mo Kaya		Episode: "Letters"	
2011	Rod Santiago's The Sisters	Rafael Leonidez		
2012	Felina: Prinsesa ng mga Pusa	Joaquin		
2016	The Story of Us	Ronnie		

== Awards and nominations ==
Year	Work	Award	Category	Result	Source
1999	Saan Ka Man Naroroon	PMPC Star Awards for Television	Best New TV Personality	Won	
