= List of The Story of Us episodes =

Television Series

The Story of Us is a 2016 Philippine romantic melodrama television series a production of Star Creatives directed by Richard Somes, starring Kim Chiu and Xian Lim, together with an ensemble cast. The series premiered on ABS-CBN and worldwide on The Filipino Channel on February 29, 2016, replacing On the Wings of Love.

The show ended on June 17, 2016, concluding the first and second season with 77 episodes.

== Series overview ==
Season	Episodes	Originally released	
Season	Episodes	First released	Last released
1	62	February 29, 2016	May 27, 2016
2	15	May 30, 2016	June 17, 2016

== Episodes ==
=== Book 1 ===
No. overall	No. in season	Title	Official hashtag	Date Aired	Ratings
1	1	'World Premiere' (World Premiere)	#TSOUWorldPremiere	February 29, 2016	18.2%
2	2	'Pagkakaibigan' (Friendship)	#TSOUPagkakaibigan	March 1, 2016	19.8%
3	3	'Pangako' (Promise)	#TSOUPangako	March 2, 2016	19.4%
4	4	'Mahal Kita' (I Love You)	#TSOUMahalKita	March 3, 2016	17.9%
5	5	'Paglisan' (Leaving)	#TSOUPaglisan	March 4, 2016	19%
6	6	'Maynila' (Manila)	#TSOUMaynila	March 7, 2016	18.7%
7	7	'Pride' (Pagmamataas)	#TSOUPride	March 8, 2016	19.7%
8	8	'Pangangailangan' (Needs)	#TSOUPangangailangan	March 9, 2016	17.5%
9	9	'Petition' (Petisyon)	#TSOUPetition	March 10, 2016	18.9%
10	10	'Amerika' (America)	#TSOUAmerika	March 11, 2016	18.5%
11	11	'Ldr' (Long Distance Relationship)	#TSOULdr	March 14, 2016	18.7%
12	12	'Kapit Lang' (Hold On)	#TSOUKapitLang	March 15, 2016	19.2%
13	13	'Paasa' (Hoper)	#TSOUPaasa	March 16, 2016	18.3%
14	14	'Panggap' (Pretend)	#TSOUPanggap	March 17, 2016	19.1%
15	15	'Pagsosolo' (Self-Determination)	#TSOUPagsosolo	March 18, 2016	17.1%
16	16	'Denied' (Tinanggihan)	#TSOUDenied	March 21, 2016	18.3%
17	17	'Hinala' (Suspicion)	#TSOUHinala	March 22, 2016	22.1%
18	18	'Fallout' (Pagtapos)	#TSOUFallout	March 23, 2016	22.1%
19	19	'Langit At Lupa' (Heaven And Earth)	#TSOULangitAtLupa	March 28, 2016	18.9%
20	20	'Lugmok' (Prostrate)	#TSOULugmok	March 29, 2016	18.3%
21	21	'Transform' (Pagbabagong-Anyo)	#TSOUTransform	March 30, 2016	20.8%
22	22	'Jump' (Takas)	#TSOUJump	March 31, 2016	19.3%
23	23	'Times Square' (Times Square)	#TSOUTimesSquare	April 1, 2016	20.3%
24	24	'Halik' (Kiss)	#TSOUHalik	April 4, 2016	20.1%
25	25	'Pusong Palaban' (Gladiatory Heart)	#TSOUPusongPalaban	April 5, 2016	17.6%
26	26	'Ex' (Dating Kasintahan)	#TSOUEx	April 6, 2016	21.1%
27	27	"Awkward" (Ilang)	#TSOUAwkward	April 7, 2016	19.4%
28	28	'Buhay OFW' (OFW Life)	#TSOUBuhayOFW	April 8, 2016	19.2%
29	29	'Clodette' (Clodette)	#TSOUClodette	April 11, 2016	18.9%
30	30	'The Two Of Us' (Tayong Dalawa)	#TSOUTheTwoOfUs	April 12, 2016	18.2%
31	31	'Bagong Simula' (New Beginning)	#TSOUBagongSimula	April 13, 2016	17.6%
32	32	'Get Over' (Paglampas)	#TSOUGetOver	April 14, 2016	18.7%
33	33	'Hamon' (Challenge)	#TSOUHamon	April 15, 2016	18.4%
34	34	'Fire' (Pagsisante)	#TSOUFire	April 18, 2016	17.1%
35	35	'Heart Break' (Pusong Nasaktan)	#TSOUHeartBreak	April 19, 2016	18.3%
36	36	'Without You' (Wala Ka)	#TSOUWithoutYou	April 20, 2016	17.9%
37	37	'Serendipity' (Magandang Unawaan)	#TSOUSerendipity	April 21, 2016	18.3%
38	38	'Hubad' (Naked)	#TSOUHubad	April 22, 2016	17.2%
39	39	'It's Complicated' (Kumplikado)	#TSOUItsComplicated	April 25, 2016	17.3%
40	40	'Set Up' (Panggap)	#TSOUSetUp	April 26, 2016	18.9%
41	41	'Realization' (Pagsasakatuparan)	#TSOURealization	April 27, 2016	18.5%
42	42	'Impact' (Banggaan)	#TSOUmpact	April 28, 2016	17.4%
43	43	'Gaya Ng Dati' (Like The Past)	#TSOUGayaNgDati	April 29, 2016	19.7%
44	44	'Closer' (Paglalapit)	#TSOUCloser	May 2, 2016	17.5%
45	45	'Bonding' (Pagsasama)	#TSOUBonding	May 3, 2016	14.7%
46	46	'Next Step' (Susunod Na Hakbang)	#TSOUNextStep	May 4, 2016	16.1%
47	47	'Uncertain' (Alanganin)	#TSOUUncertain	May 5, 2016	16.3%
48	48	'The Proposal' (Pag-alok)	#TSOUTheProposal	May 6, 2016	16%
49	49	'Desperate' (Desperado)	#TSOUDesperate	May 10, 2016	17.4%
50	50	'Sandigan' (Power)	#TSOUSandigan	May 11, 2016	18.7%
51	51	'Holding On' (Pagkapit)	#TSOUHoldingOn	May 12, 2016	19%
52	52	'Almost' (Muntikan)	#TSOUAlmost	May 13, 2016	17.4%
53	53	'Holding Back' (Pagtitimpi)	#TSOUHoldingBack	May 16, 2016	17.7%
54	54	'Runaway' (Pagtakas)	#TSOURunaway	May 17, 2016	17.3%
55	55	'Sugal' (Sacrifice)	#TSOUSugal	May 18, 2016	16.8%
56	56	'Itinatago' (Hiding)	#TSOUItinatago	May 19, 2016	17.6%
57	57	'Confrontation' (Komprontasyon)	#TSOUConfrontation	May 20, 2016	16.4%
58	58	'Kasal' (Wedding)	#TSOUKasal	May 23, 2016	17.7%
59	59	'Game Changer' (Pagbabagong-buhay)	#TSOUGameChanger	May 24, 2016	17.5%
60	60	'The Investor' (Ang Mamumuhunan)	#TSOUTheInvestor	May 25, 2016	17.5%
61	61	'Twist Of Fate' (Mapaglarong Kapalaran)	#TSOUTwistOfFate	May 26, 2016	17.1%
62	62	'Mapaglarong Kapalaran' (Twist Of Fate)	#TSOUMapaglarongKapalaran	May 27, 2016	17.1%

=== Book 2: The Finale ===
No. overall	No. in season	Title	Official hashtag	Date Aired	Ratings
63	1	'Life Changes' (Bagong Buhay)	#TSOULifeChanges	May 30, 2016	17.5%
64	2	'Crush And Crash' (Paghanga at Pagsalpok)	#TSOUCrushAndCrash	May 31, 2016	19%
65	3	'Crossroads' (Pagkrus ng Landas)	#TSOUCrossroads	June 1, 2016	16.9%
66	4	'Square 1' (Unang Pagtapat)	#TSOUSquare1	June 2, 2016	18.7%
67	5	'Full Circle' (Pagsasama)	#TSOUFullCircle	June 3, 2016	19.4%
68	6	'Sa Dating Tagpuan' (The Same Place)	#TSOUSaDatingTagpuan	June 6, 2016	19.6%
69	7	'Abot Kamay' (Over The Horizon)	#TSOUAbotKamay	June 7, 2016	20.1%
70	8	'What If' (Paano Kung)	#TSOUWhatIf	June 8, 2016	18.6%
71	9	'Hawak Kamay' (Holding Hands)	#TSOUHawakKamay	June 9, 2016	20%
72	10	'Chances' (Pagkakataon)	#TSOUChances	June 10, 2016	19.3%
73	11	'Kahapon' (Past)	#TSOUKahapon	June 13, 2016	18%
74	12	'Baka Sakali' (Possibly)	#TSOUBakaSakali	June 14, 2016	20%
75	13	'Noon At Ngayon' (Then And Now)	#TSOUNoonAtNgayon	June 15, 2016	20%
76	14	'TiCoy' (Tin And Macoy)	#TSOUTiCoy	June 16, 2016	22.6%
77	15	"The End Of The Story" (Ang Pagtatapos ng Storya)	#TSOUTheEndOfTheStory	June 17, 2016	23.1%
