= Rod Santiago's The Sisters =

- Genre: Drama
- Created by: Associated Broadcasting Company; Rod A. Santiago
- Based on: The Sisters by Rod A. Santiago
- Directed by: Joyce Bernal; Argel Joseph
- Starring: Nadine Samonte; Leandro Muñoz; James Blanco; Wendell Ramos; Victor Silayan
- Theme music composer: George Canseco
- Opening theme: "Hiram" by Faith Cuneta
- Country of origin: Philippines
- Original languages: Filipino; English
- No. of episodes: 40

Production
- Executive producer: Manuel V. Pangilinan
- Running time: 30 minutes

Original release
- Network: TV5
- Release: July 18 – September 9, 2011

Rod Santiago's The Sisters is a 2011 Philippine television drama series broadcast by TV5. The series is based on a 1987 Philippine film at the same title. Directed by Joyce Bernal and Argel Joseph, it stars Nadine Samonte, Leandro Muñoz, James Blanco, Wendell Ramos and Victor Silayan. It aired from July 18 to September 9, 2011, replacing Babaeng Hampaslupa and was replaced by Ang Utol Kong Hoodlum. The show marks Samonte's first project in TV5.

== Synopsis ==
It features the compelling story of twins Cristina and Bella Santiago whose relationship is put to the test with the consequences of their personal choices and the obstacles that fate brings their way.

== Story ==
The Santiago twins Bella and Cristina (both portrayed by Nadine Samonte) may look exactly alike, but beneath their identical faces lies an extreme difference that entails their twisted fate. Cristina and Bella will also fall prey to the scheming ways of their vindictive aunt Socorro (Rio Locsin), who will stop at nothing to take everything from the sisters and their family. This new primetime series also brings back one of the most talented actors and sought after leading men to popular dramatic actresses, Leandro Muñoz. Portraying the role of the twins’ childhood friend Rafael, his character will be enmeshed in a complicated love triangle that will greatly affect the bond between the two sisters.

== Cast ==
=== Main cast ===
- Nadine Samonte as Bella /Christina
- Leandro Muñoz as Rafael Leonidez
- James Blanco as Dennis
- Wendell Ramos as Dr. Arnel Moran

=== Extended cast ===
- Eddie Garcia as Mayor Enrique Zialcita
- Rio Locsin as Socorro Santiago
- Zoren Legaspi as Fidel Santiago
- Lotlot de Leon as Soledad Santiago
- Alicia Alonzo as Yaya Maxima
- Susan Africa as Carlota Zialcita
- Tanya Garcia as Georgia
- Perla Bautista as Consuelo
- Andrea Del Rosario as Daniela
- Victor Silayan as Warren Zialcita
- Eula Caballero as Sheila
- Edgar Allan Guzman as Jimmy
- Rocky Gutierrez as Fredo

=== Cameo appearance ===
- Jestoni Alarcon as Eduardo Santiago
- Angel Jacob as Leticia Santiago
- Bobby Andrews as Young Enrique
- Meg Imperial as Young Socorro
- Paul Montecillo as Young Fidel
- Morissette Amon as Young Carlota
- Andrea Gonzales as Young Cristina
- Nicole Gonzales as Young Bella

=== The Santiago Family ===
- Eduardo Santiago
- Leticia Santiago
- Socorro Santiago
- Fidel Santiago
- Soledad Santiago
- Cristina Santiago
- Bella Santiago

== Soundtrack ==
The Sister's theme song is an exceptional rendition of the song Hiram performed by Faith Cuneta with Gerald Salonga's Philharmonic Orchestra.

== Trivia ==
- Both Lotlot De Leon and Zoren Legaspi have worked on GMA Network's recently ended Afternoon Drama Nita Negrita.
- It is also Leandro Munoz comeback to Primetime Television via TV5 after 1999-2001 he starred in the ABS-CBN's Primetime Soap Saan Ka Man Naroroon & Sa Dulo ng Walang Hanggan which ran from 2001 to 2003 after 8 years.
- This marks Samonte's first Primetime Soap for TV5 after her transfer from GMA Network. Her final project in the said network is My Lover, My Wife.
- It is also the Fourth Primetime Television Series for TV5 replacing the successful Primetime Offering Babaeng Hampaslupa, Mga Nagbabagang Bulaklak and My Driver Sweet Lover.
- The First Primetime TV Series filmed and shot in HD.
- This is newcomer Victor Silayan's first acting role. He has been seen in commercials such as Lucky Me! and Stresstabs. He also took part in the Bench Uncut Fashion Show. He is related to former Beauty Queen, and late Chat Silayan and actor Vic Silayan.
- This theme song used on its same name of the theme song of Hiram which aired in ABS-CBN way back in 2004, performed by Zsa Zsa Padilla after Palimos ng Pag-ibig (both 1986 original Filipino film then a TV series remake in the first Sineserye Presents installment).

== See also ==
- List of TV5 (Philippine TV network) original programming
