= Bearwin Meily =

Filipino actor, comedian, and magician (born 1976)

- Born: Erwin Meily; Manila, Philippines
- Occupations: Actor, comedian
- Years active: 1995–present
- Spouse: Lara Mae Meily
- Relatives: Mark Meily (brother)

Bearwin Meily is a Filipino comedian actor, TV host and a vlogger.

== Early career ==
He started his career in 1995 as an extra in the top-rating sitcom Palibhasa Lalake in ABS-CBN and eventually became part of the regular cast until the show ended in 1998. Subsequently, he was also launched as part of Star Circle Batch 6 where he was the only non-heartthrob and comedian that made the elite group. After he was launched, he also became a regular in the network's gag show Super Laff-In from 1997 to 1999 and the sitcom Bida si Mister, Bida si Misis.

== Current career ==
But later on he moved to ABS-CBN's rival network GMA 7 in 2003, joining the sitcom Kool Ka Lang. After the show was cancelled the same year, he joined the replacement sitcom Lagot Ka, Isusumbong Kita and the fantasy drama series Mulawin in 2004. He was later on relaunched by GMA Network when he was given his own TV show with Benjie Paras, "NAKS!" which lasted for a year. He also appeared as sidekick in romantic movies like Let the Love Begin, I Will Always Love You and Say That You Love Me. He was later launched in Hari ng Sablay in 2006 which became a box-office success. When his showbiz career eventually slowed down, Bearwin turned his attention to magic and is now a professional magician.

In 2011, Meily moved to TV5.

In 2014, Meily returned to ABS-CBN 2 for his current sitcom, Home Sweetie Home.

On March 23, 2015, Meily was part of the "Lucky Stars" of Kapamilya, Deal or No Deal and won P1,000,000, making Bearwin as first millionaire of the season five.

In 2019, Meily returned to GMA 7 with his two programs, a drama anthology, "Tadhana", and a comedy anthology, Dear Uge.

In 2020, Meily also guested Mars Pa More as a cooking guy on the set and aired also on Kapuso Network GMA 7.

== Politics ==
He ran for councilor of Taytay, Rizal in 2019, but lost, landing on the 9th place.

== Personal life ==
He is the younger brother of movie director Mark Meily. He also has nine other sibling and is a pastor. In a 2024 interview, he acknowledged becoming a victim of drug abuse.

== Filmography ==
=== Film ===
Year	Title	Role
1997	Hari ng Yabang	Goon
1999	Hey Babe	Noli
1999	Oo Na, Mahal Na Kung Mahal	Bearwin
2000	Tunay na Tunay: Gets Mo? Gets Ko!	Dick
2001	Bakit 'Di Totohanin	Junior
2001	Yamashita: The Tiger's Treasure	Elmore
2003	You and Me Against the World	Dirty Harry
2003	Asboobs: Asal Bobo	
2003	Captain Barbell	Lobo
2003	Crying Ladies	Male game show host
2004	Gagamboy	Assistant barangay captain
2004	Lastikman: Unang Banat	Garoy
2005	Let the Love Begin	Boy Palito
2005	Say That You Love Me	Caloy
2005	Hari ng Sablay	Mars
2006	I Will Always Love You	Ogie
2006	Tatlong Baraha	Tomas / Lolo / Tom
2006	Shake, Rattle and Roll 8	Sonny
2007	Bahay Kubo: A Pinoy Mano Po!	Habagat
2009	When I Met U	Tato
2009	Nobody, Nobody But... Juan	Security guard
2013	The Fighting Chefs	Good chef guy
2016	Lumayo Ka Nga sa Akin	Bandit guy

=== Television ===
Year	Title	Role
1996–1998	Palibhasa Lalake	Himself
1998–1999	Richard Loves Lucy	Himself
2001	Da Pamilya En Da Pilot	Himself
2001	Da Body En Da Guard	Himself
2002	Kay Tagal Kang Hinintay	
2003	Bida si Mister, Bida si Misis	Totoy
2003	Ok Fine Whatever	Himself
2004	Lagot Ka, Isusumbong Kita	Tom
2004	Naks!	Himself
2004	Mulawin	Kuwak
2005	Darna	Toy Master
2005	Love to Love	
2006	Majika	Bodyal
2007	Lupin	Danggoy
2007	Mga Kuwento ni Lola Basyang: Ang Parusa ng Duwende	Empoy
2007	Mga Kuwento ni Lolo Kalbo	
2007	Bubble Gang	Himself
2008–2009	Camera Café	Himself
2008–2009	Luna Mystika	Bikodong
2009	Zorro	Pirate #1
2009–2010	Darna	Watson
2010	Basahang Ginto	Various
2010	Maynila	Various
2010	Kaya ng Powers	Donald Thought
2011	Dwarfina	Wendong
2012	Makapiling Kang Muli	Dexter
2012	Felina: Prinsesa ng mga Pusa	Mang Porky
2013	Madam Chairman	Ben Boljak
2014–2018	Home Sweetie Home	Ed
2015	Kapamilya, Deal or No Deal	Briefcase Number 14
2015	Sabado Badoo	Himself Cameo Footage Featured
2016	FPJ's Ang Probinsyano	JO2 Timbang
2017	Banana Sundae	Himself/Guest
2018	Dear Uge	Funny Guy
2019	Tadhana	Pinoy OFW Guy
2020	Mars Pa More	Himself/Guest
