= Philippine Advertising Congress =

- Frequency: Biannual
- Country: Philippines
- Inaugurated: 1969
- Most recent: 2011
- Website: www.adcongress.com.ph

Philippine Advertising Congress (PAC), or simply the Ad Congress, was an annual gathering of Philippine broadcast CEOs, advertisers, and personalities in the Philippines organized by the Advertising Board of the Philippines.

It was first held in Cebu in April 28, 1969 It was last held in 2011. The 2013 edition was cancelled, with the Ad Congress supplanted by the Ad Summit Pilipinas within the same year.

== Editions ==
- 1st: 1969, Cebu
- 12th: 1991, Bacolod
- 13th: 1993, Olongapo (Subic Bay)
- 14th: 1995, Baguio
- 16th: 1999, Cebu City
- 17th: 2001, Cebu City
- 18th: 2003, Baguio
- 19th: 2005, Cebu City
- 20th: 2007, Olongapo (Subic Bay)
- 21st: 2009, Olongapo (Subic Bay) – originally Baguio due to Typhoon Parma (Pepeng)
- 22nd: 2011, Pili, Camarines Sur
- 23rd: 2013, Davao City (cancelled)
