= 2022 Taytay, Rizal, local elections =

Local elections in the Philippines

2022 Taytay local elections
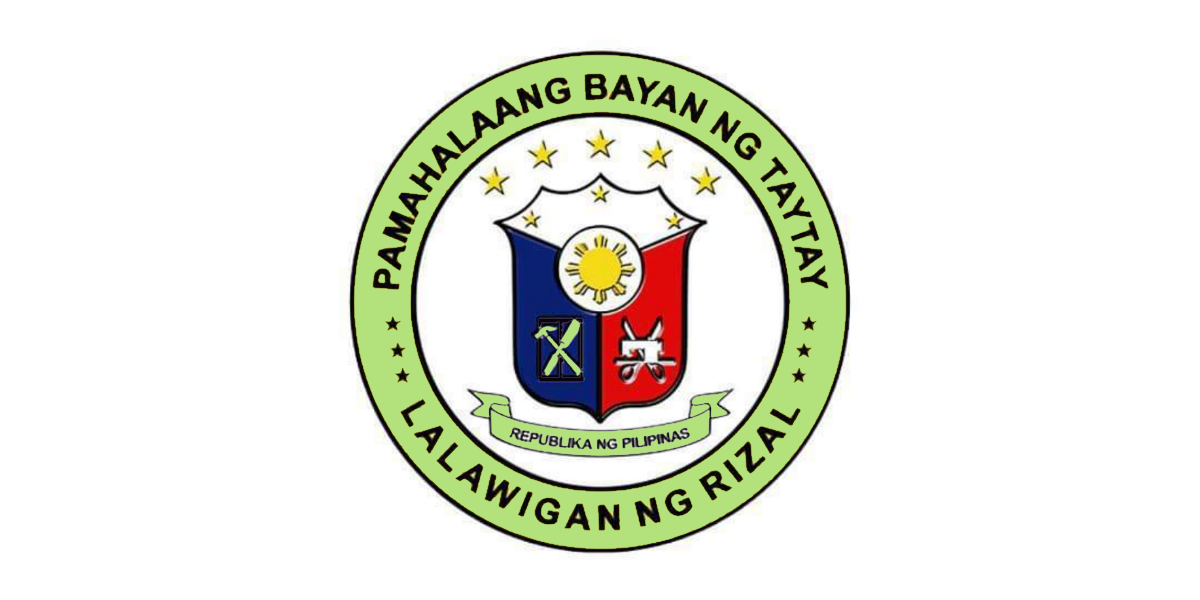
- Registered: 152,994
- Turnout: 129,437 (84.6%)
- 2022 Taytay mayoral election
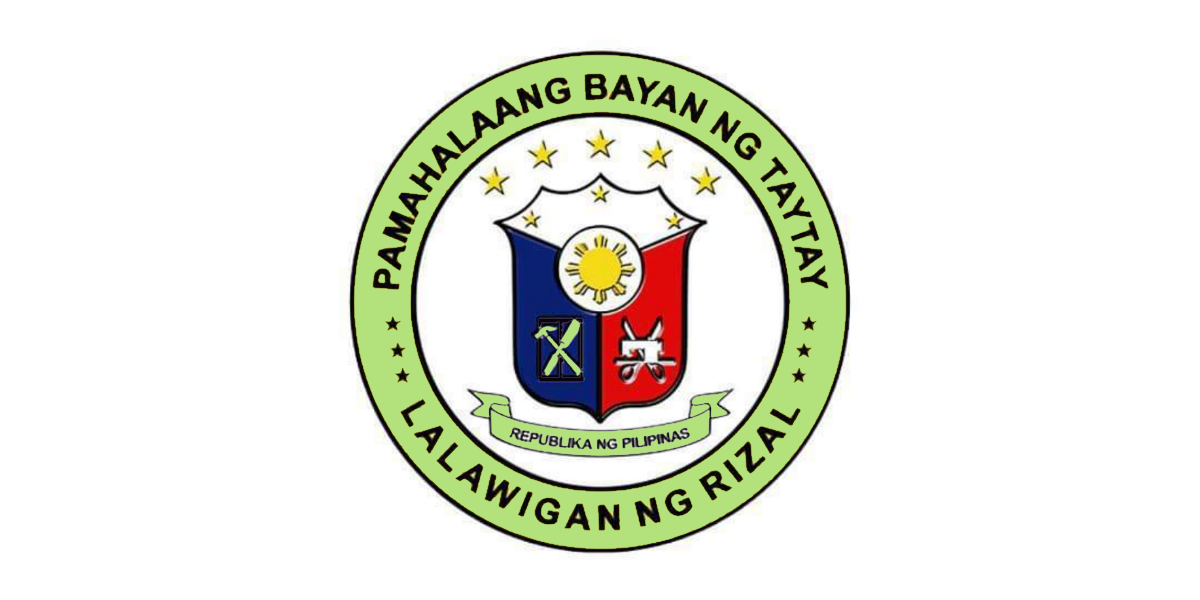
- May 9, 2022
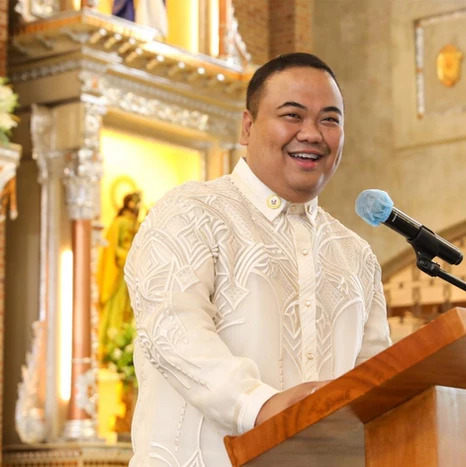

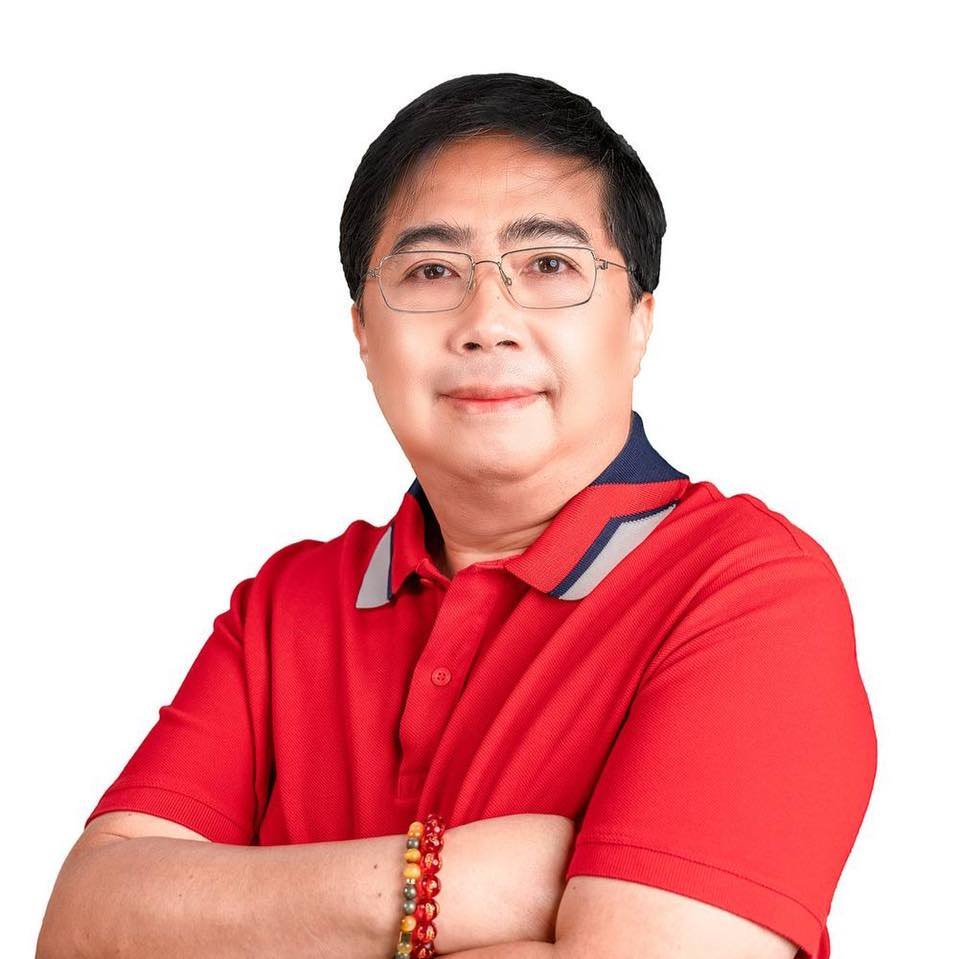
Candidate	Allan De Leon	Joric Gacula
Party	NPC	Nacionalista
Running mate	Pia Cabral	Mitch Bermundo
Popular vote	66,738	49,767
Percentage	53.62	39.98
Mayor before election
Joric Gacula
Nacionalista
Elected mayor
Allan De Leon
NPC
- 2022 Taytay vice mayoral election
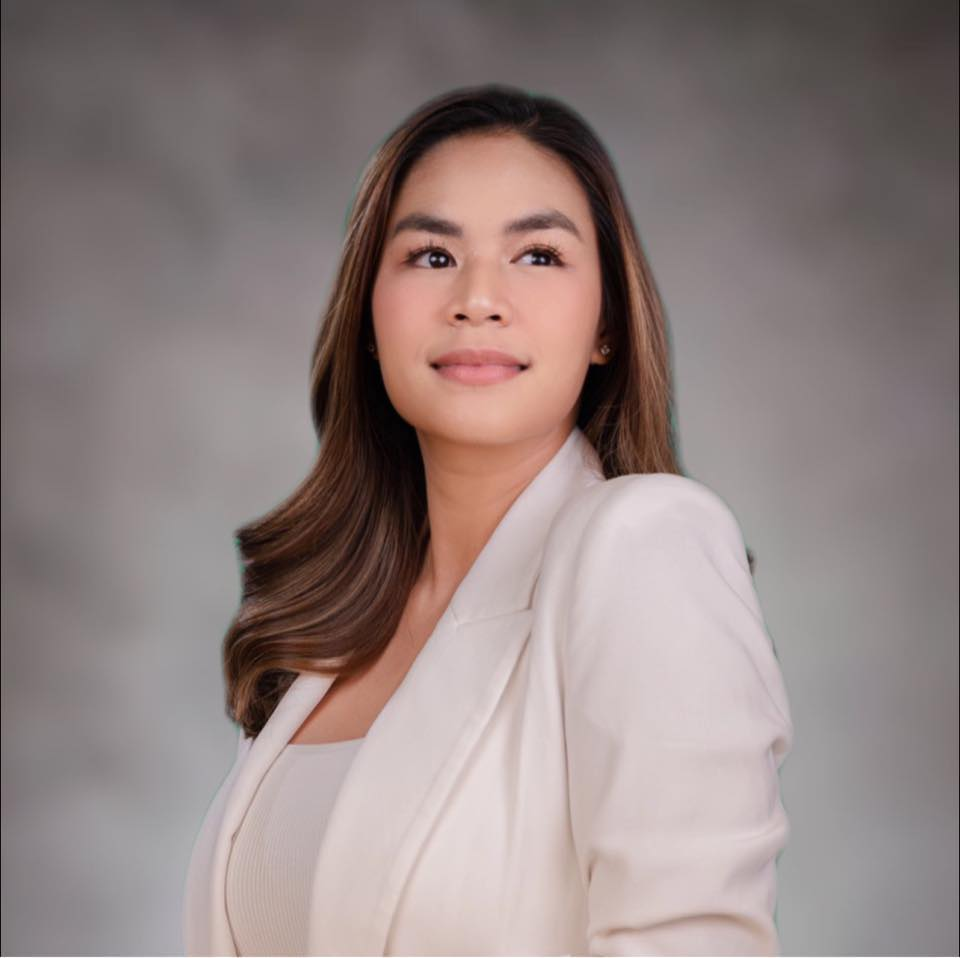

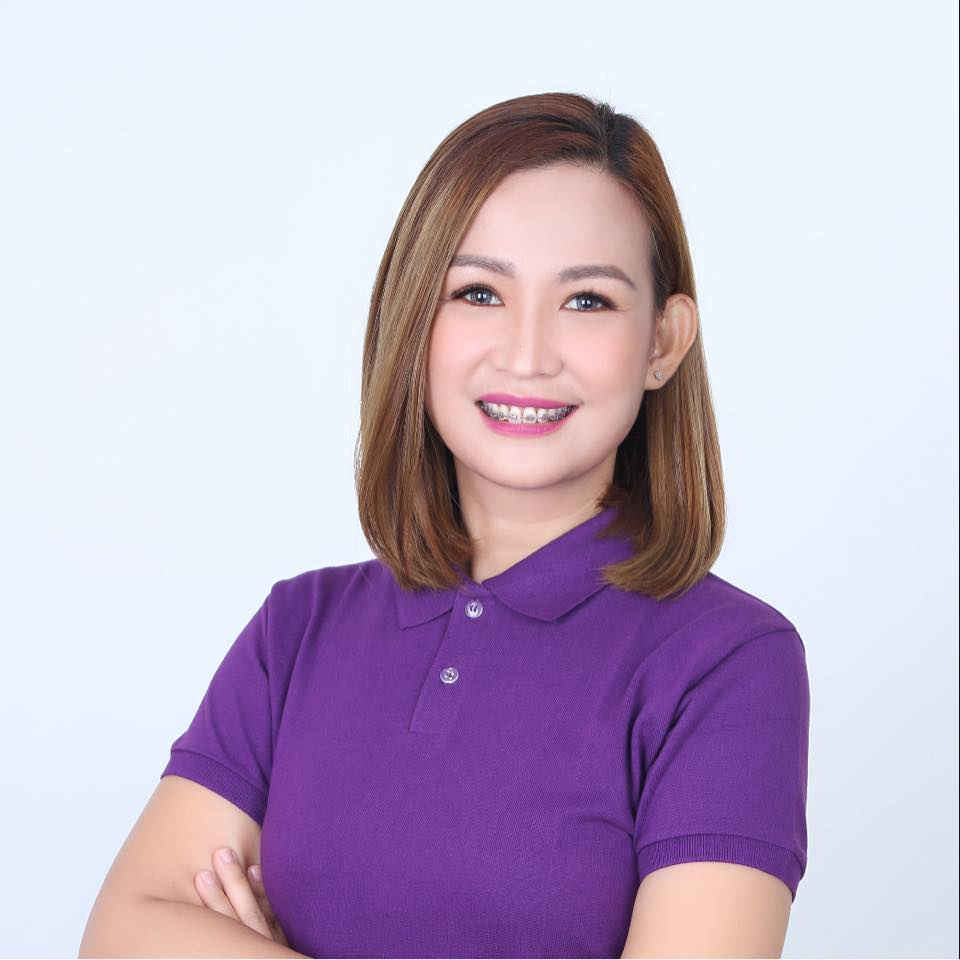
Candidate	Pia Cabral	Mitch Bermundo
Party	PDP–Laban	Nacionalista
Popular vote	58,162	42,381
Percentage	47.41	34.55
Vice Mayor before election
Mitch Bermundo
Nacionalista
Elected Vice Mayor
Pia Cabral
PDP–Laban

Local elections were held in Taytay, Rizal on Monday, May 9, 2022, as a part of the 2022 Philippine general election. Voters will select candidates for all local positions: a town mayor, vice mayor and town councilors, as well as members of the Sangguniang Panlalawigan, a governor, a vice-governor and a representative for the province's first congressional district in the House of Representatives.

The town's election turnout is 84.6%, (218 of 218 election returns) equivalent to 129,437 of 152,994 total registered voters. Barangay Dolores chairman Allan De Leon won the mayoral race against Outgoing Mayor Joric Gacula. Councilor Pia Cabral won the vice mayoralty race against Outgoing Vice mayor Mitch Bermundo, and Vice mayoral aspirant Eljun Victor.

== Background ==
In the 2019 election, Joric Gacula was re-elected to a second term as mayor defeating then vice mayor Bonoy Gonzaga. His running mate, Mitch Bermundo was elected to her first term as vice mayor under Gacula defeating Gonzaga's running mate then councilor JV Cabitac.

Outgoing mayor George Ricardo II Reyes "Joric" Gacula is seeking re-election for a third and final term. Gacula served as mayor from 2004 to 2013, which totals to six terms if elected as mayor. His main opponent is Barangay Dolores chairman Allan Martine Singcuenco De Leon.

During the campaign period of the 2022 election, President Rodrigo Duterte endorsed Allan De Leon and Pia Cabral for mayor and vice mayor respectively. Duterte said that they helped him win during his presidential campaign, and he wants to repay the favor.

Allan De Leon, and Pia Cabral together with the winning candidates on the Sangguniang Bayan election are proclaimed as winners of the 2022 Taytay local elections shortly after election day. Outgoing mayor Joric Gacula then accepted the results and said that he "Would leave things up to the Lord," and thanked Taytayeños who supported and helped him in his five terms as Mayor.

== Candidates ==
=== Administration coalition ===
Development Team (Nacionalista Party)
#	Name	Party
For Mayor
5.	Joric Gacula	Nacionalista
For Vice Mayor
1.	Mitch Bermundo	Nacionalista
For Councilor (Lone District)
1.	Patrick Alcantara	Nacionalista
6.	Joan Calderon	Nacionalista
7.	Papoo Cruz	Nacionalista
9.	Sharon De Leon-Macabebe	Nacionalista
13.	Kyle Gacula	Nacionalista
15.	Boknay Leonardo	Nacionalista
20.	Gene Liza Resurreccion	Nacionalista
22.	Jeca Villanueva	Nacionalista

=== Primary opposition coalition ===
Team Sagip Taytay
#	Name	Party
For Mayor
4.	Allan De Leon	NPC
For Vice Mayor
3.	Pia Cabral	PDP–Laban
For Councilor (Lone District)
4.	JV Cabitac	NPC
5.	Lengjoey Calderon	NPC
11.	Tak Faeldon Diño	PDP–Laban
12.	Tisoy Encisa	PDP–Laban
14.	Reggie Gonzaga-Mascardo	Reporma
18.	Chesca Persia	NPC
19.	Krsjan Ram	PROMDI
21.	Hellen Valera	Lakas

=== Other candidates ===
Team Bago Naman
#	Name	Party
For Mayor
6.	Mohaimen Guinal	KBL
For Vice Mayor
4.	Noli Mendoza	KBL
For Councilor (Lone District)
3.	Ramil Bengco	Aksyon
10.	Bayan dela Cruz	Aksyon

Worker's and Peasant's Party
#	Name	Party
For Mayor
2.	Edwin Magsino Cayetano	WPP
For Councilor (Lone District)
2.	Arlen Belgira	WPP

=== Non-independents not in tickets ===
#	Name	Party
For Councilor (Lone District)
8.	Tobit Cruz	Akbayan
17.	Arnelle Pagalilauan	PFP

=== Independents not in tickets ===
#	Name	Party
For Mayor
1.	Efren Andres	Independent
3.	Adan De Leon	Independent
For Vice Mayor
2.	Rene Bueno	Independent
5.	Eljun Victor	Independent
For Councilor (Lone District)
16.	Christina Loyola	Independent

== Results ==
=== Mayoral election ===
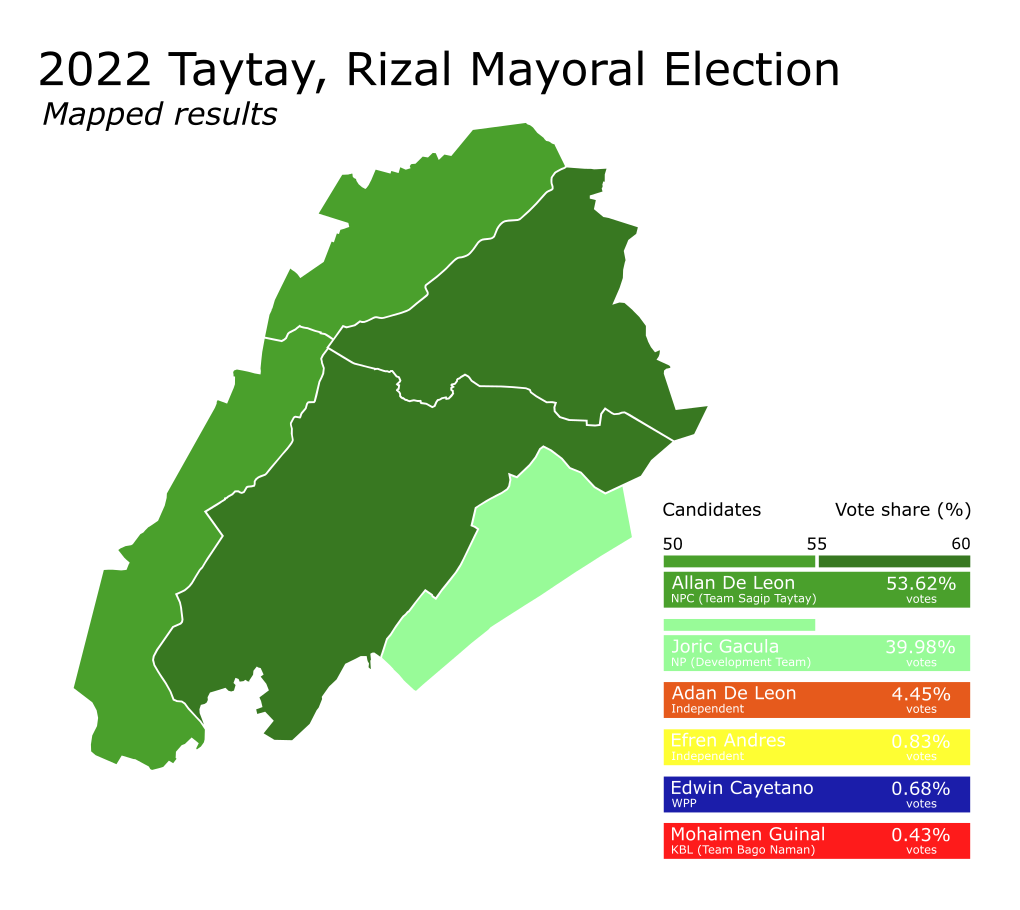
Results per barangay according to ER returns

Incumbent mayor Joric Gacula is seeking re-election for a third and final term against Barangay Dolores Chairman Allan De Leon.

Taytay mayoral election
Party	Candidate	Votes	%
NPC	Allan De Leon	66,738	53.62
Nacionalista	Joric Gacula	49,767	39.98
Independent	Adan De Leon	5,544	4.45
Independent	Efren Andres	1,034	0.83
WPP	Edwin Magseno Cayetano	852	0.68
KBL	Mohaimen Guinal	530	0.43
Valid ballots		124,465	96.16
Invalid or blank votes		4,972	3.84
Total votes		129,437	100.00
NPC gain from Nacionalista			

Popular vote percentage
Allan De Leon	53.62%
Joric Gacula	39.98%
Adan De Leon	4.45%
Others	1.94%

=== By barangay ===
Barangay	Allan De Leon		Gacula		Adan De Leon		Andres		Cayetano		Guinal	
Barangay	Votes	%	Votes	%	Votes	%	Votes	%	Votes	%	Votes	%
Dolores	16,751	57.99	10,426	36.09	1,169	4.05	299	1.04	141	0.49	101	0.35
Muzon	5,288	43.8	6,208	51.42	379	3.14	108	0.89	53	0.44	37	0.31
San Isidro	7,840	51.15	6,462	42.16	660	4.31	182	1.19	73	0.48	110	0.72
San Juan	24,050	55.01	16,916	38.69	2,006	4.59	282	0.64	291	0.67	178	0.41
Santa Ana	12,809	52.38	9,755	39.89	1,330	5.44	163	0.67	294	1.2	104	0.43
TOTAL	66,738	53.62	49,767	39.98	5,544	4.45	1,034	0.83	852	0.68	530	0.43

=== Vice mayoral election ===
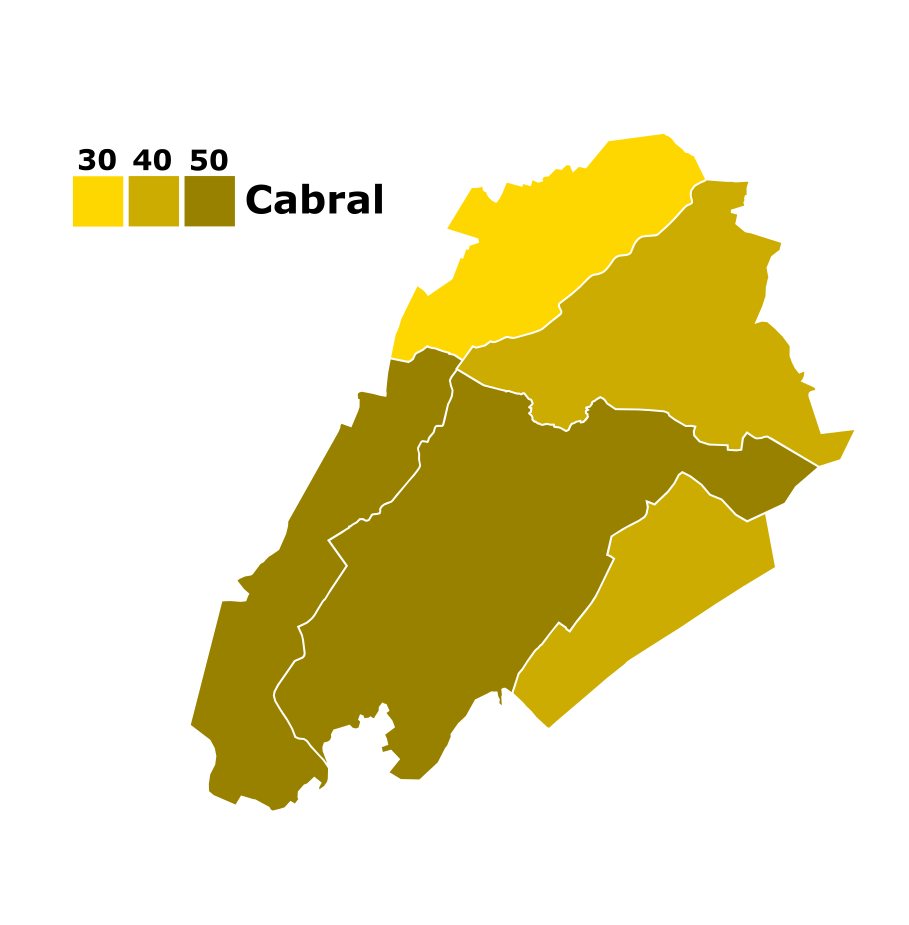
Results per barangay according to ER returns

Incumbent vice mayor Mitch Bermundo is seeking re-election for a second term against Councilor Pia Cabral, and vice mayoral aspirant Eljun Victor.

Taytay vice mayoral election
Party	Candidate	Votes	%
PDP–Laban	Pia Cabral	58,162	47.41
Nacionalista	Mitch Bermundo	42,381	34.55
Independent	Eljun Victor	15,822	12.90
Independent	Rene Bueno	3,767	3.07
KBL	Noli Mendoza	2,541	2.07
Valid ballots		122,673	94.77
Invalid or blank votes		6,764	5.23
Total votes		129,437	100.00
PDP–Laban gain from Nacionalista			

Popular vote percentage
Pia Cabral	47.41%
Mitch Bermundo	34.55%
Eljun Victor	12.90%
Others	5.14%

=== By barangay ===
Barangay	Cabral		Bermundo		Victor		Bueno		Mendoza	
Barangay	Votes	%	Votes	%	Votes	%	Votes	%	Votes	%
Dolores	13,022	45.9	9,437	33.26	3,924	13.83	1,428	5.03	559	1.97
Muzon	5,364	45.12	5,045	42.44	1,037	8.72	242	2.04	200	1.68
San Isidro	5,859	38.54	5,700	37.5	2,788	18.34	586	3.86	268	1.76
San Juan	21,770	50.45	14,251	33.02	5,077	11.77	1,061	2.46	994	2.3
Santa Ana	12,147	50.48	7,948	33.03	2,996	12.45	450	1.87	520	2.16
TOTAL	58,162	47.41	42,381	34.55	15,822	12.90	3,767	3.07	2,541	2.07

=== Sangguniang Bayan election ===
Election is via plurality-at-large voting: A voter votes for up to eight candidates, then the eight candidates with the highest number of votes are elected.

Party or alliance		Votes	%	Seats
Nacionalista Party		412,203	49.59	5
Team Sagip Taytay	Nationalist People's Coalition	159,323	19.17	2
Team Sagip Taytay	PDP–Laban	55,368	6.66	0
Team Sagip Taytay	Lakas–CMD	49,319	5.93	0
Team Sagip Taytay	Partido para sa Demokratikong Reporma	37,027	4.45	0
Team Sagip Taytay	PROMDI	24,941	3.00	0
Team Sagip Taytay	Total	325,978	39.22	2
Akbayan		52,066	6.26	1
Aksyon Demokratiko		19,195	2.31	0
Partido Federal ng Pilipinas		10,498	1.26	0
Worker's and Peasants' Party		3,178	0.38	0
Independent		8,084	0.97	0
Ex officio seats				2
Total		831,202	100.00	10

Vote share
Nacionalista	49.59%
Team Sagip Taytay	39.22%
Akbayan	6.26%
Others	4.92%

City Council seats
Nacionalista	62.5%
Team Sagip Taytay	25%
Akbayan	12.5%

Taytay Sangguniang Bayan election
Party	Candidate	Votes	%
NPC	JV Cabitac	63,644	7.65
Nacionalista	Jeca Villanueva	59,452	7.15
Nacionalista	Papoo Cruz	58,891	7.08
Nacionalista	Patrick Alcantara	56,971	6.85
NPC	Lengjoey Calderon	56,189	6.75
Akbayan	Tobit Cruz	52,066	6.26
Nacionalista	Joan Calderon	50,512	6.07
Nacionalista	Boknay Leonardo	49,971	6.01
Nacionalista	Kyle Gacula	49,333	5.93
Lakas	Hellen Valera	49,319	5.93
Nacionalista	Sharon De Leon-Macabebe	48,964	5.89
NPC	Chesca Persia	39,490	4.75
Nacionalista	Gene Liza Resurreccion	38,109	4.58
Reporma	Reggie Gonzaga-Mascardo	37,027	4.45
PDP–Laban	Tak Faeldon Diño	31,072	3.73
PROMDI	Krsjan Ram	24,941	3.00
PDP–Laban	Tisoy Encisa	24,296	2.92
Aksyon	Bayan dela Cruz	14,125	1.69
PFP	Arnelle Pagalilauan	10,498	1.26
Independent	Crisinta Loyola	8,084	0.97
Aksyon	Ramil Bengco	5,070	0.60
WPP	Arlen Belgira	3,178	0.38
Valid ballots		831,202	80.27
Invalid or blank votes		204,294	19.73
Total votes		1,035,496	100.00
