= Julia Clarete =

Filipina actress and singer (born 1979)

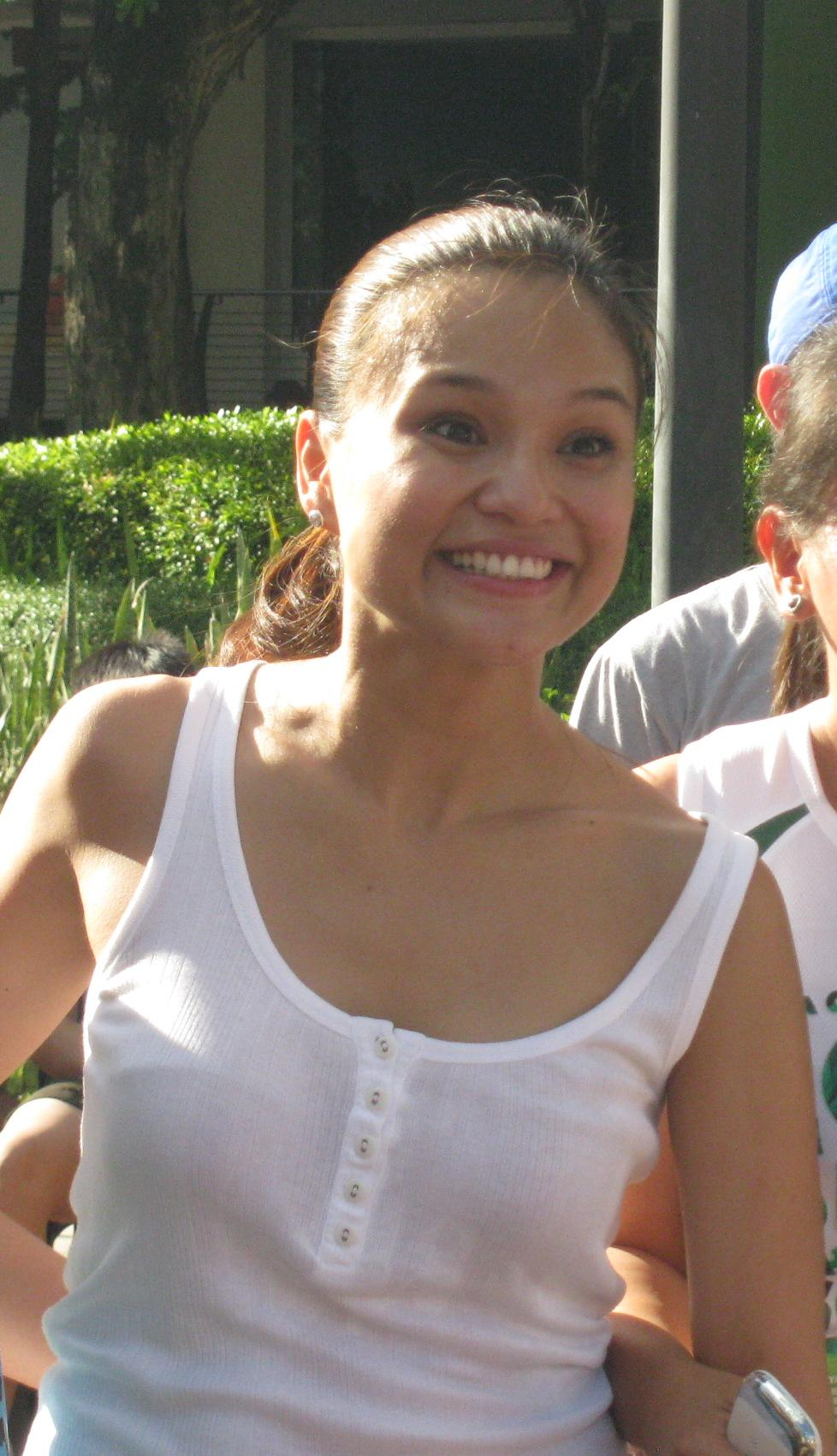
- Clarete in 2010
- Born: Edda Giselle Rosetta Nuñez Clarette; September 24, 1979 (age 46); Makati, Philippines
- Occupations: Singer; actress; host; songwriter
- Years active: 1995–2016; 2020–present
- Agent: Star Magic (1995–2003)

Edda Giselle Rosetta Nuñez Clarette (born September 24, 1979), known professionally as Julia Clarete (Tagalog pronunciation: [klaˈrɛtɛ]), is a Filipino singer, actress, and television host. She is best known as one of the co-hosts of Eat Bulaga!, the longest running noontime TV show in the Philippines.

Clarete was introduced as a member of Star Circle (now Star Magic) Batch 4 in 1996.

== Personal life ==
Julia is the youngest child with three older brothers; most of them studied at Casa Del Nino Montessori and attended high school in San Pedro Laguna.

In May 2007, she gave birth to a son named Sebastian, fathered by Stephen Uy. She is married to Gareth McGeown, Coca-Cola’s Commercial Director for Malaysia and Singapore.

In January 2016, Clarete, now based in Kuala Lumpur, resigned as one of the hosts of Eat Bulaga! after 10 years, due to personal reasons. In March 2016, she made an appearance in Eat Bulaga! and even joked about applying for a position as a cast member.

== Filmography ==
=== Film ===
Year	Title	Role	Notes	Source
1995	Hataw Na	–		
1995	Biyudo si Daddy, Biyuda si Mommy	Julia		
1997	Hanggang Kailan Kita Mamahalin	Marge		
1999	Soltera	Cathy		
2000	Kahit Isang Saglit	Ginny		
2001	Naririnig Mo Na Ba Ang 18est?	Cathy		
2001	Trip	Nadine		
2002	Jologs	Joan		
2004	Quezon City	Lally		
2004	Kilig...Pintig...Yanig	–		
2005	Sa Ilalim ng Cogon	Katia		
2005	Dreamboy	Mabel		
2006	Nasaan si Francis?	Candy		
2006	Milagroso	–		
2006	TxT	Ida		
2006	Wrinkles			
2006	Wag Kang Lilingon	Maila L. Santiago/Crying Lady/White Lady		
2008	SEB: Cyber Game of Love	Khia		
2008	Scaregivers	Policewoman		
2010	Emir	Angie		
2011	San Lazaro	Kathy		
2011	Bisperas	Ara		
2011	Shake, Rattle & Roll 13	Cornelia	Segment: "Parola"	
2012	Guni-Guni	Vangie		

=== Television ===
Year	Title	Role	Notes	Source
1996	Gimik	Jules		
1997	Kaybol	Herself		
1997	Esperanza	Angie		
1998	Bayani	Ester Belarmino		
1998	Ipaglaban Mo!	Vicky	Episode: "Balon"	
2001	Sa Puso Ko Iingatan Ka	Shiela Montecillo		
2001	Strangebrew	Erning	two episodes of Season 1	
2002	Bituin	Agnes Gandoza		
2003	Sana'y Wala Nang Wakas	Denise		
2004	Maalaala Mo Kaya	Adult Miriam	Episode: "Puno"	
2005–16	Eat Bulaga!	Herself – Host		
2005	Hollywood Dream	Herself / Winner		
2005	Love to Love	Cherry Pie	Season 9	
2005	Magpakailanman	Ente's daughter	Episode: "The Vicente Undicimo Story"	
2005	Magpakailanman	Rizza Navales	Episode: "The Rizza Navales Story"	
2005	Magpakailanman	Herself	Episode: "The Julia Clarete Story"	
2006–07	Bakekang	Georgia		
2008	SOP	Herself – Performer		
2012	Talentadong Pinoy	Herself — Judge		
2012	Bonakid Pre-School: Ready, Set, Laban!	Herself – Host		
2014	Bonakid Pre-School: Ready, Set, Laban! Season 2	Herself – Host		
2020	Paano ang Pasko?	Love Aguinaldo-Robles		
2021	Paano ang Pangako?	Love Aguinaldo-Robles		
2023	Barangay Mirandas	Miriam Sebastian		

=== Concert ===
Year	Concert Title	Role	Location
2015	Tamang Panahon: Concert	Young Lola Tinidora	Philippine Arena

== Discography ==
- Bumalik Ka Lang (2006)

== Magazine appearances ==
- FHM Philippines (December 2005 issue)
- Smart Alternatives Magazine (April/May 2011 issue)

== Awards and nominations ==
Year	Work	Award	Category	Result	Source
2011	Emir	8th Golden Screen Awards	Best Performance by an Actress in a Supporting Role (Drama, Musical or Comedy)	Nominated	
2011		Cinemalaya Independent Film Festival	Best Supporting Actress Director's Showcase Category	Won	
2011		28th Star Awards for Movies	Movie Supporting Actress of the Year	Nominated	
2011	Eat Bulaga	Enpress Golden Screen TV Awards	Outstanding Female Host in a Musical or Variety Program (Eat Bulaga!)	Won	
2012		35th Gawad Urian Awards	Best Supporting Actress	Nominated	
2012		26th PMPC Star Awards	Best Female TV Host	Nominated	
2014		1st EB Dabarkads Choice Awards	Best Actress	Nominated	
