= Sheryl Cruz =

Filipino actress, recording artist, television host, and composer

- Born: Sheryl Rose Anna Marie Sonora Cruz; April 5, 1974 (age 52); Makati, Rizal, Philippines
- Occupations: Actress recording artist television host composer
- Years active: 1979–present
- Political party: PMP (2019)
- Spouse: Norman Bustos (m. 1996; div. 2010)
- Children: 1 (Ashley Nicole Bustos, known professionally as Nicole Sonora)
- Parents: Ricky Belmonte (father); Rosemarie Sonora (mother)
- Relatives: Susan Roces (aunt); Fernando Poe Jr. (uncle); Tirso Cruz III (uncle); Sunshine Cruz (cousin); Geneva Cruz (cousin); Donna Cruz (cousin); Rayver Cruz (cousin); Rodjun Cruz (cousin)

Sheryl Rose Anna Marie Sonora Cruz (born April 5, 1974) is a Filipino actress, singer, television personality, and composer. Beginning her career as a child actress, she rose to prominence during the 1980s and early 1990s as one of the leading young stars of Philippine film and television. She gained recognition as a member of the youth-oriented television program That's Entertainment and as a member of the singing trio The Triplet, alongside Tina Paner and Manilyn Reynes.

Throughout a career spanning more than four decades, Cruz has appeared in numerous films, television dramas, anthology programs, musical productions, and variety shows. She is known for her roles in Sinasamba Kita, Rosalinda, Bakekang, Magkaagaw, Prima Donnas, Lilet Matias: Attorney-at-Law, and Born to Shine. In addition to acting, she pursued a recording career and received Gold and Platinum Record Awards as a solo artist. Her work in film, television, and music has earned recognition from organizations including the Film Academy of the Philippines, the Guillermo Mendoza Memorial Scholarship Foundation, the PMPC Star Awards, and the Film Development Council of the Philippines. GMA News Online identified Cruz as one of the notable alumni of That's Entertainment, alongside Lea Salonga, Francis Magalona, Billy Crawford, Ruffa Gutierrez, Manilyn Reynes, Romnick Sarmenta, Keempee de Leon, and Janno Gibbs.

Cruz is the daughter of actors Ricky Belmonte and Rosemarie Sonora, the niece of actress Susan Roces and actor Tirso Cruz III, and the niece by marriage of National Artist for Film and Broadcast Arts Fernando Poe Jr.

Beginning her career as a child actress, Sheryl Cruz later emerged as one of the prominent young actresses of Philippine film and television during the late 1980s and early 1990s. She gained wider recognition as part of the pioneering generation of performers on the youth-oriented variety program That's Entertainment, created by German Moreno, where she was a member of the program's Wednesday Group. During her years on the program, Cruz was also a member of The Triplet, a singing trio composed of Cruz, Kristina Paner, and Manilyn Reynes.

Prior to and during her participation in That's Entertainment, Cruz established herself as one of the most recognizable young stars of her generation through numerous film appearances and her popular screen partnership with Romnick Sarmenta. A retrospective published by PEP.ph noted that Cruz had already been dubbed the "Princess of Philippine Cinema" during her years on the program, while GMA News Online referred to her as the "Princess of Philippine Movies". Her growing popularity was attributed in part to the success of her love team with Sarmienta.

After returning to the Philippines, Cruz resumed her acting career as a freelance actress, appearing in television, film, and musical projects across multiple networks and production companies. In a 2007 interview with PEP.ph, she described herself as a freelance artist and stated that she was not under an exclusive contract with any television network, allowing her to accept projects from different broadcasters.

In 2012, Cruz made a guest appearance in the ABS-CBN series Walang Hanggan, portraying the young Virginia "Manang Henya" Cruz, a character later portrayed by her aunt Susan Roces. The following year, she joined the cast of Galema: Anak ni Zuma as Galela Carriedo while continuing to work as a freelance performer across television and film productions.

In 2019, Cruz portrayed Veron Santos in the GMA Network drama series Magkaagaw. The role marked a departure from many of her previous antagonist portrayals and was described by Cruz as an opportunity to explore more mature and challenging dramatic material. In interviews, she credited her manager Rams David of Artist Circle Talent Management for encouraging her to reconsider the project after initially hesitating to accept the role.

In 2022, she joined the cast of Prima Donnas, portraying Bethany Fajardo-Howards in the series' second season. Initially introduced as a guardian to Donna Lyn and Lenlyn while living in Australia, the character later emerged as the principal antagonist Kendra Fajardo Claveria, earning attention for Cruz's dual-role performance.

In 2024, Cruz portrayed principal antagonist Patricia Valdez-Egaño in the legal drama series Lilet Matias: Attorney-at-Law. The series became one of the most successful afternoon programs of its period and further strengthened her reputation for portraying complex antagonist roles. Her performance earned recognition from award-giving bodies in the Philippines and abroad throughout the program's run from 2024 to 2026.

In 2026, Cruz joined the cast of the musical drama series Born To Shine, portraying Giovanna "Vanna" Grande, the head vocal coach of the series' P-Pop boot camp. The same year, she starred alongside Ejay Falcon and Bembol Roco in the drama film Kappa-tiran, directed by Neal Tan and produced by Marcos Mamay. Inspired by the acclaimed 1982 film Batch '81, the film centers on fraternity life and was developed as part of Mamay Production's advocacy to support the Philippine film industry and provide opportunities for aspiring actors.

Over the course of her career, Cruz became known for portraying strong and complex female characters on television. Her body of work has included leading ladies, romantic rivals, matriarchs, anti-heroines, and antagonists across a wide range of drama productions. Roles such as Divina Ferrer in Sinasamba Kita, Veron Santos in Magkaagaw, Valeria del Castillo-Altamirano in Rosalinda, Valeria Manero-Arevalo in Bakekang, Patricia Engaño in Lilet Matias: Attorney-at-Law, and Coach Vanna in Born to Shine demonstrated her ability to portray diverse characters spanning multiple genres and generations of Philippine television.

== Acting career ==
Cruz started her career at age four.

She won the FAMAS Best Child Actress award for her portrayal in the film Mga Basang Sisiw opposite Janice de Belen, Che Che and Julie Vega. She also won Best Child Actress for the film Roman Rapido opposite Fernando Poe Jr. She was also in the movie Ang Leon at ang Kuting (1980) with Fernando Poe Jr. and in Tropang Bulilit (1981) with Niño Muhlach and Lea Salonga.

She was later contracted by Regal Films along with Kristina Paner and Manilyn Reynes as one of the Regal Babies. Cruz also recorded the album Must Be Heaven with Reynes and Paner under Ivory Records.

At that time, GMA Network established the youth-oriented television program That's Entertainment, hosted by German Moreno, where Sheryl Cruz became a member of the Wednesday Group. During her time on the show, she was paired with actor Romnick Sarmenta, forming one of the program's popular love teams.

In 1987, Cruz portrayed Maritess in the Regal Films drama Asawa Ko Huwag Mong Agawin, directed by Emmanuel H. Borlaza.

Cruz later signed a contract with Seiko Films, where she was paired with actor Romnick Sarmenta. In 1990, she starred in the Metro Manila Film Festival entry Ama… Bakit Mo Ako Pinabayaan?, directed by National Artist for Cinema Lino Brocka, portraying Julie, a blind young woman. The film was named Second Best Picture at the 1990 Metro Manila Film Festival and won five awards, including Best Supporting Actor for Robert Arevalo and Best Child Performer for Guila Alvarez, who portrayed the younger version of Julie.

During the early-to-mid 1990s, Cruz headlined her own season of Star Drama Theater (later Star Drama Presents), under the title Sheryl. The anthology format featured selected actors and actresses in multi-episode story arcs designed to showcase their dramatic range. Directors associated with her season included Lore Reyes, Mac Alejandre, Jerry Lopez Sineneng, and Rory Quintos.

In August 2004, Cruz returned to the Philippines and starred in the comeback film Mano Po III: My Love alongside Vilma Santos.

Cruz's breakthrough came through her appearances in two seasons of Now and Forever, as well as in Tinig and Ganti, which were among GMA Network's successful afternoon drama productions during the period.

In 2006, Cruz portrayed Valeria Arevalo in Bakekang, one of the central figures in the conflict surrounding the title character.

In 2007–2008, she transferred to ABS-CBN after her career on GMA, where she portrayed Miss Minchin in Princess Sarah, Xandra in Komiks Presents: Varga, and appeared in Lobo.

She later returned to GMA Network for Luna Mystika opposite Heart Evangelista.

In 2009, she portrayed another character named Valeria, Valeria Altamirano, in the Philippine adaptation of Rosalinda.

In the mid-plot of the Sine Novela offering Tinik sa Dibdib, Cruz was cast as an additional character in the series, rumored that she was the replacement of Ara Mina. Cruz later joined the cast of the series as Rita Domingo, a key character in the series' central love triangle involving Lando and Lorna. After her role in Tinik sa Dibdib, Cruz was chosen by GMA Network to appear in Langit sa Piling Mo as a guest star. She also starred in the first season of the reality-comedy series Ang Yaman ni Lola and portrayed Fabiola in the fantasy-action series Grazilda, performing a role that combined drama, fantasy, and physically demanding action sequences.

In 2011, Cruz moved to TV5 and joined the cast of Mga Nagbabagang Bulaklak, portraying Rosal Flores. She also portrayed the young Helena See in the TV5 drama series Babaeng Hampaslupa, opposite her aunt, Susan Roces, who played the character's older counterpart. She later returned to GMA Network through the remake of Ikaw Lang ang Mamahalin. In 2012, Cruz made a guest appearance in the ABS-CBN series Walang Hanggan, portraying the young Virginia "Manang Henya" Cruz, a character later portrayed by her aunt Susan Roces. The following year, she joined the cast of Galema: Anak ni Zuma as Galela Carriedo while continuing to work as a freelance performer across television and film productions.

On December 7, 2013, Cruz won ₱1,000,000 on ABS-CBN's The Singing Bee after correctly guessing the lyrics to four consecutive songs in the final round.

Before her victory episode, Cruz was featured among the celebrity contestants competing for the jackpot prize alongside Rez Cortez, Dennis Padilla, Tina Paner, and Tirso Cruz III.

She returned to GMA network again in 2014, and was given many roles and TV appearances including the primetime drama series Strawberry Lane.

In a 2020 retrospective feature, GMA Entertainment highlighted several of Cruz's notable and iconic television and film roles, including Mga Basang Sisiw, That's Entertainment, Bakekang, Sinasamba Kita, Rosalinda, Luna Mystika, Ikaw Lang ang Mamahalin, Strawberry Lane, Buena Familia, Once Again, Meant to Be, and My Guitar Princess.

In 2019, Cruz reunited with Sunshine Dizon in the drama series Magkaagaw. She portrayed Veron Razon-Santos, one of the series' central female characters whose complex relationship and rivalry with Laura drove much of the story's narrative. She starred alongside Dizon, Jeric Gonzales, and Klea Pineda.

In 2022, she joined the cast of the afternoon drama series Prima Donnas, portraying the role of Bethany Howards in Season 2. Initially depicted as a kindhearted guardian to Donna Lyn / Lenlyn (portrayed by Sofia Pablo) in Australia, her character transitions to the main antagonist, Kendra Fajardo Claveria, taking over the antagonist role previously portrayed by Aiko Melendez in the first season. Her portrayal of the dual role received attention for its dramatic villain arc.

In 2024, Cruz portrayed Patricia Valdez-Engaño, the principal antagonist of the GMA Network legal drama series Lilet Matias: Attorney-at-Law, starring Jo Berry. The series became one of the most prominent projects of Cruz's later career and further showcased her work in antagonist roles. During production, she worked alongside an ensemble cast that included Jo Berry, Maricel Laxa, Rita Avila, Bobby Andrews, Jason Abalos, and National Artist Nora Aunor.

In 2026, Cruz joined the cast of the GMA Network musical drama series Born To Shine, portraying Giovanna "Vanna" Grande, the head coach and vocal coach of the series' P-Pop boot camp alongside fellow former teen stars Manilyn Reynes and Tina Paner. The same year, she starred alongside Ejay Falcon and Bembol Roco in the drama film Kappa-tiran, directed by Neal Tan and produced by Marcos Mamay. Inspired by the acclaimed 1982 film Batch '81, the film centers on fraternity life and was developed as part of Mamay Production's advocacy to support the Philippine film industry and provide opportunities for aspiring actors.

== Music career ==
In the 1980s, Cruz became a member of the Filipino musical trio Triplet together with Tina Paner and Manilyn Reynes. The group later reunited for The Triplet Concert in 2017 held at the Music Museum in San Juan, Metro Manila.

Cruz continued performing her original recordings through television appearances and live musical guestings, including a September 2017 appearance on Net 25’s Letters & Music, where she performed the songs “Mananatili” and “Sa Puso Ay Ikaw Pa Rin”.

Cruz also appeared among the actresses featured in the music video for Jose Mari Chan's ballad Beautiful Girl, alongside several prominent female personalities in Philippine entertainment.

=== There's No Place Like Home (2009) ===
In 2009, Cruz released her third studio album There's No Place Like Home under Wow Music. The album was produced in association with the Department of Tourism's WOW Philippines campaign and was dedicated to Overseas Filipino Workers and their families. Its lead single, "Luzviminda", was used as a theme song for the campaign, while the album promoted Filipino culture, heritage, and tourism.

=== Other musical collaborations ===
- 2020 – "Breathless" (The Corrs cover) – virtual musical collaboration with cousins Donna Cruz, Geneva Cruz, and Sunshine Cruz. The performance marked the online reunion of the Cruz cousins and received coverage from multiple Philippine media outlets.

== Politics ==
In early 1986, 11-year-old Cruz was noted to be attending KBL campaign sorties alongside other celebrities for the reelection of president Ferdinand Marcos in the 1986 snap election.

Cruz ran for councilor of Manila from the 2nd district under Pwersa ng Masang Pilipino in 2019 but did not succeed.

== Personal life ==
Her parents were both Sampaguita Pictures stars, Ricky Belmonte and Rosemarie Sonora. Through her mother, Cruz belongs to the Sonora family of actors and entertainers. She is the niece of actress Susan Roces and the niece by marriage of actor Fernando Poe Jr.

In 2022, Cruz shared a family photograph featuring Rosemarie Sonora, Susan Roces, Eddie Gutierrez, and Elvis Presley in Las Vegas, highlighting her family's long association with Sampaguita Pictures and Philippine cinema.

Cruz and her husband Norman Bustos were married in 1996 and later divorced in the United States after 12 years of marriage.

They have one daughter, Ashley Nicole Bustos, who performs professionally as Nicole Sonora. In 2023, she graduated summa cum laude with a degree in Psychology from San Francisco State University. She subsequently pursued a career in entertainment and was introduced to the public as Nicole Sonora in 2026.

Cruz belongs to the Cruz family, one of the most prominent families in Philippine entertainment.

She is a great-granddaughter of Tirso Cruz Sr., the Filipino bandleader, conductor of the Manila Hotel Orchestra, and composer of Mabuhay, My Philippines ("Mabuhay"), the ceremonial honors march associated with presidential arrivals and national state occasions.

== Filmography ==
=== Film ===
| Year | Title | Role | Segment / Episode | Director | Production |
|---|---|---|---|---|---|
| 1976 | Sapagkat Kami'y Mga Misis Lamang | Child of Celia Rodriguez and Phillip Salvador (uncredited) | — | F.H. Constantino | Virgo Films |
| 1979 | Pepeng Kulisap | Sheryl | — | J. Erastheo Navoa | D'Wonder Films |
| 1979 | Agimat ni Pepe | Lourdes | — | J. Erastheo Navoa | D'Wonder Films |
| 1980 | Good Morning Sunshine | Sheryl | — | Ishmael Bernal | Lea Productions |
| 1980 | Candy | Candy | — | Joey Gosiengfiao | Silver Screen Films |
| 1981 | Mga Basang Sisiw | Sheryl | — | Agustin dela Cruz | BSH Films |
| 1981 | Tropang Bulilit | Sonea | — | J. Erastheo Navoa | D'Wonder Films |
| 1982 | Roman Rapido | Rita | — | Argel Joseph | BSH Films / FPJ Productions |
| 1982 | Totoy Saudi | Herself | — | William Pascual | Baby Pascual Films & Associates |
| 1983 | Lovingly Yours, Helen: The Movie | Jinky | Nang Maupos ang Kandila | Argel Joseph | BSH Films |
| 1983 | Home Sweet Home | Janet | — | William Pascual | Baby Pascual Films & Associates |
| 1985 | I Have Three Hands | Anak ni Don Severino | — | Luciano B. Carlos | Regal Films |
| 1985 | Mga Kwento ni Lola Basyang | Luisa | Querubin / Maria Leonora Theresa | Maryo J. de los Reyes | Regal Films |
| 1986 | When I Fall in Love | Susie | — | Joey Gosiengfiao | Regal Films |
| 1986 | Batang Quiapo | Sonea | — | Pablo Santiago | Regal Films |
| 1986 | Payaso | Herself | — | Celso Ad. Castillo | Sialina Enterprises |
| 1987 | Asawa Ko Huwag Mong Agawin | Maritess | — | Emmanuel H. Borlaza | Regal Films |
| 1987 | No Retreat... No Surrender... Si Kumander | Jenny (daughter of Gener and Benita) | — | Pablo Santiago | FPJ Productions |
| 1987 | 1 + 1 = 12 (+1): One Plus One Equals Twelve (Cheaper by the Dozen) | Laura Domingo — one of the 12 Domingo children | — | Mike Relon Makiling | Regal Films |
| 1988 | Rock-A-Bye Baby: Tatlo ang Daddy | Jinky | — | Ben Feleo | Seiko Films |
| 1988 | Puso sa Puso | Roselle | — | Emmanuel H. Borlaza | Seiko Films |
| 1988 | Mirror, Mirror on the Wall | Young Panchang | — | Emmanuel H. Borlaza | Seiko Films |
| 1988 | Langit at Lupa | Susan | — | Emmanuel H. Borlaza | Seiko Films |
| 1988 | One Two Bato, Three Four Bapor | Julie | — | Ben Feleo | Seiko Films |
| 1988 | Bihagin ang Dalagang Ito | Kakay | — | Emmanuel H. Borlaza | Seiko Films |
| 1989 | Everlasting Love | Michelle | — | Ben Feleo | Seiko Films |
| 1989 | Pardina at ang mga Duwende | Pardina | — | Mike Relon Makiling | Seiko Films |
| 1990 | Sagot ng Puso | Elsie | — | Leroy Salvador | Seiko Films |
| 1990 | "Mundo Man Ay Magunaw" | Alma | — | Leroy Salvador | Seiko Films |
| 1990 | "Ama... Bakit Mo Ako Pinabayaan?" | Julie | — | Lino Brocka | Seiko Films |
| 1991 | Ganito Ba ang Umibig? | Melissa | — | Laurice Guillen | Seiko Films |
| 1991 | Kapag Nag-abot ang Langit at Lupa | Fatima | — | Francis Posadas | Seiko Films |
| 1991 | Kung Tayo'y Magkakalayo | Levi | — | Mel Chionglo | Seiko Films |
| 1992 | Eddie Tagalog: Pulis Makati | Regine | — | Dante Javier | |
| 1992 | Ipaglaban Mo Ako, Boy Topak | Valerie | — | Manuel 'Fyke' Cinco | Good Harvest Films |
| 1992 | Takbo... Talon... Tili!!! | Debora | Ang Lalaki sa Salamin | Efren Jarlego | Seiko Films |
| 1993 | Ronquillo: Tubong Cavite, Laking Tondo | Karla | — | Joey Del Rosario | Star Cinema / Regal Films |
| 1993 | Ms. Dolora X: Ipagtatanggol Kita! | Dolora | — | Elwood Perez | Regal Films |
| 1993 | Row 4: Baliktorians | Cherry Dela Rama | — | Ben Feleo | Viva Films |
| 1994 | Hataw Tatay Hataw | Jenny | — | Efren Jarlego | Regal Films |
| 1994 | Macario Durano | Jessica | — | Joey del Rosario | Moviestars Production |
| 1994 | Greggy en' Boogie: Sakyan Mo Na Lang, Anna | Anna | — | Efren Jarlego | Regal Films |
| 1994 | Sobra Talaga... Over | Marietta | — | Manny Castaneda | Regal Films |
| 1994 | Paano Na sa Mundo ni Janet? | Janet | — | Jose N. Carreon | Good Harvest Presentation |
| 1994 | Shake, Rattle & Roll V | Gina | Anino | Jose Javier Reyes | Regal Films |
| 1995 | Pulis Probinsiya 2: Tapusin Na Natin ang Laban | Dr. Estella Tongco | — | Augusto Salvador | Regal Films / PS Films / Good Harvest |
| 1995 | Kailanman | Rosita | — | Manny Castañeda | Regal Films |
| 1996 | Milyonaryong Mini | Salud | — | Tony Y. Reyes | Star Cinema / Regal Entertainment |
| 1996 | Ikaw Naman ang Iiyak | Penny Bersola | — | Joel Lamangan | Viva Films |
| 2004 | Mano Po III: My Love | Bernadette Yang | — | Joel Lamangan | Regal Entertainment / MAQ Productions |
| 2006 | Shake, Rattle and Roll 8 | Grace | Yaya | Topel Lee | Regal Films |
| 2015 | Felix Manalo | Sanang | — | Joel Lamangan | Viva Films / Philippine Christian Movie Production |
| 2026 | Kappa-tiran | Elvie | — | Neal "Buboy" Tan | Mamay Productions |

=== Television / Digital Series ===
| Year | Title | Role(s) | TV Network | Director(s) | Notes |
|---|---|---|---|---|---|
| 1981–1986 | Lovingly Yours, Helen | Various roles | GMA Network (1981–1984); BBC-2 / City2 Television (1984–1986); returned to GMA Network in 1986 | Argel Joseph, Redgie Acuña-Magno | |
| 1986–1992 | That's Entertainment | Herself / Wednesday group member | GMA Network | Buddy Daliwan | |
| 1988–1993 | Lunch Date | Herself / Regular host and performer | GMA Network | Vincent Dy Buncio | |
| 1989–1990 | John en Marsha | Shirley Puruntong | RPN 9 (Radio Philippines Network) | Apollo Arellano | |
| 1992 | Maalaala Mo Kaya ("Gasera") | Puring | ABS-CBN 2 | Mac Alejandre | |
| 1992 | Maalaala Mo Kaya ("Bundok") | Emmie | ABS-CBN 2 | Emmanuel H. Borlaza | Aired January 29, 1992 |
| 1993 | Maalaala Mo Kaya ("Supot") | Angie | ABS-CBN 2 | Lupita Aquino-Kashiwahara | Aired February 3, 1993 |
| 1993 | Simula ng Walang Hanggan | Anna | GMA Network | Maryo J. de los Reyes | Television film |
| 1994–1995 | Star Drama Theater (Sheryl) | Various lead roles | ABS-CBN 2 | Lore Reyes, Mac Alejandro, Jerry Lopez Sineneng, Rory Quintos | Headlined her own anthology season |
| 1992–1996 | GMA Supershow | Herself / Co-host | GMA Network | Al Quinn, Fritz Infante, Willy Caliao, Louie Ignacio, and Bud Daliwan | |
| 1992-1994 | Billy Bilyonaryo | Shirley | GMA Network | Jose Javier Reyes | |
| 1996 | Maalaala Mo Kaya ("Dinuguan") | Susan Roces | ABS-CBN 2 | Rory B. Quintos | Episode aired May 2, 1996 |
| 1996 | Maalaala Mo Kaya (“Karinderya”) | Carmen Cabling | ABS-CBN 2 | Nick Lizaso | |
| 1998 | Hiram na Singsing | Gigi | GMA Network | Joey Romero | GMA Telesine Special / Television film |
| 1999 | Hanggang Panaginip Lang | Elena | GMA Network | Joey Romero | GMA Telesine Special / Television film |
| 2004 | Magpakailanman ("May Kulay Ba Ang Pagmamahal? (The Jinky Oda Story)") | Jinky Oda | GMA Network | Gina Alajar | |
| 2004 | Mulawin | Linang | GMA Network | Dominic Zapata, Lore Reyes | |
| 2004 | Startalk | Herself / Host | GMA Network | Floy Quintos | |
| 2004 | Wag Kukurap | Herself | GMA Network | — | Episode: Ang Hiwaga ng Kimono / Vacation House (Episode 12; aired November 13, 2004) |
| 2005 | Now and Forever: Ganti | Samantha | GMA Network | Mac Alejandre | |
| 2006 | Now and Forever: Tinig | Selena | GMA Network | Mac Alejandre | |
| 2006–2007 | Bakekang | Valeria Arevalo | GMA Network | Gil Tejada Jr. | |
| 2007 | Sine Novela: Sinasamba Kita | Divina Ferrer | GMA Network | Joel Lamangan, Rommel Penesa | |
| 2007 | Mga Mata ni Anghelita | Magdalena | GMA Network | Gil Tejada Jr., Khryss Adalia | |
| 2007 | Princess Sarah | Miss Maria Minchin | ABS-CBN 2 | Don M. Cuaresma, Nuel C. Naval | |
| 2007 | Love Spell: Cindy-rella | Diana | ABS-CBN 2 | Ruel S. Bayani, Ricky Rivero | |
| 2008 | Maalaala Mo Kaya ("Bracelet") | Farida | ABS-CBN 2 | Nuel C. Naval | |
| 2008 | Lobo | Young Eleanora "Lady Elle" Blancaflor | ABS-CBN 2 | FM Reyes, Cathy Garcia-Molina, Jerry Lopez Sineneng | |
| 2008 | Komiks Presents: Varga | Xandra | ABS-CBN 2 | Trina N. Dayrit, Dondon S. Santos | |
| 2008–2009 | Luna Mystika | Alice Sagrado | GMA Network | Micheal Tuviera, Gil Tejada Jr. | |
| 2009 | SRO Cinemaserye: Ganti Ng Puso | Viola Ojeda | GMA Network | Dominic Zapata | |
| 2009 | Rosalinda | Donya Valeria Del Castillo-Altamirano | GMA Network | Maryo J. delos Reyes | |
| 2009–2010 | Sine Novela: Tinik sa Dibdib | Rita Domingo | GMA Network | Gil Tejada Jr. | |
| 2010 | Langit sa Piling Mo | Alma Flores† | GMA Network | Gil Tejada Jr. | |
| 2010–2011 | Ang Yaman ni Lola | Kimberly Hechanova-Cabagnot | GMA Network | Dante Nico Garcia | |
| 2010–2011 | Grazilda | Fabiola | GMA Network | Dominic Zapata, Ricky Davao | |
| 2011 | Untold Stories Mula sa Face to Face: Sa Piling ng Kaaway | Nenita | TV5 | Argel Joseph | |
| 2011 | Babaeng Hampaslupa | Young Helena See | TV5 | Enrico S. Quizon (Director Eric Quizon), Joyce E. Bernal | |
| 2011 | Mga Nagbabagang Bulaklak | Rosal Flores | TV5 | Jon Red | |
| 2011 | Pidol's Wonderland | Reyna Engkantada | TV5 | Enrico S. Quizon (Director Eric Quizon) | Episode: Mahiwagang Korona |
| 2011–2012 | Ikaw Lang ang Mamahalin | Amara Luna† | GMA Network | Roderick Lindayag | |
| 2012 | Walang Hanggan | young Virginia "Henya" Cruz | ABS-CBN 2 | Jerry Lopez Sineneng, Trina N. Dayrit, Jojo A. Saguin | |
| 2012 | Isang Dakot na Luha | Helga Zamora | TV5 | Eric Quizon | |
| 2012 | Maalaala Mo Kaya: Sanggol | Susan Roces | ABS-CBN 2 | Mae Cruz-Alviar | |
| 2013–2014 | Jim Fernandez's Galema: Anak ni Zuma | Galela Carriedo | ABS-CBN 2 | Wenn V. Deramas | |
| 2013 | ASAP | Herself / Guest Performer with Tina Paner and Manilyn Reynes | ABS-CBN 2 | Johnny Manahan | |
| 2013 | Party Pilipinas | Herself / Guest Performer with Tina Paner and Manilyn Reynes | GMA Network | Mark A. Reyes, Rico Gutierrez | |
| 2013 | Sarap Diva | Herself / Guest with Tina Paner and Manilyn Reynes | GMA Network | Louie Ignacio | |
| 2013 | The Singing Bee | Herself, guest celebrity player (won 1 million pesos) | ABS-CBN 2 | Bobet Vidanes | |
| 2014 | Maalaala Mo Kaya ("Itak") | Sheryl | ABS-CBN 2 | Nuel C. Naval | Episode with Sam Concepcion as Tirso |
| 2014 | Maalaala Mo Kaya: Jeep | Rosalina "Lina" | ABS-CBN 2 | Eric Quizon | |
| 2014 | Powerhouse | Herself / featured guest | GMA Network | King Mark Baco | |
| 2014–2015 | Strawberry Lane | Monique Tolentino-Bernarte | GMA Network | Don Michael Perez | |
| 2015 | Magpakailanman: Masuwerteng Pinay sa Brunei (The Kathelyn Dela Cruz Dupaya Story) | Kathelyn "Kathy" Dela Cruz Dupaya | GMA Network | Neal Del Rosario | |
| 2015 | Love Hotline | Amalia Punzalan | GMA News TV / GMA Network | Noel Añonuevo, Allan Santiago | |
| 2015 | Imbestigador | Emilyn Gravino | GMA Network | King Mark Baco | Episode: Princess |
| 2015–2016 | Buena Familia | Josephine Carter | GMA Network | Gil Tejada Jr. | |
| 2015 | Dangwa | Sheryl Cruz | GMA Network | Adolfo Alix Jr.. | Episodes: Investigation (credit only); Sheryl Who |
| 2016 | Once Again | Agnes Lacson-Carbonnel | GMA Network | Don Michael Perez | |
| 2016 | Lip Sync Battle Philippines | Special appearance with Tina Paner and Manilyn Reynes | GMA Network | Rico Gutierrez | |
| 2017 | Oh, My Mama! | Julia Domingo-Reyes | GMA Network | Neal Del Rosario | |
| 2017 | Meant to Be | Beatriz Spencer-Del Valle | GMA Network | LA Madridejos | |
| 2017 | Unang Hirit | Guest with Tina Paner and Manilyn Reynes | GMA Network | Mon del Rosario Torres III, Noel Cabacungan, Conrado Lumabas III | |
| 2017 | Idol sa Kusina | Guest with Tina Paner and Manilyn Reynes | GMA News TV | Ogi Sugatan | |
| 2017 | Sarap Diva TBT Throwback Thursday | Guest with Tina Paner and Manilyn Reynes | GMA Network | Treb Monteras II | |
| 2017 | Wowowin | Celebrity contestant in “OPM Battle, Triple Js vs. Triplet” | GMA Network | Randy Santiago | |
| 2017 | Road Trip | Guest in Guimaras episode with Tina Paner and Manilyn Reynes | GMA Network | Aaron Mendoza | |
| 2017 | Daig Kayo ng Lola Ko | Vangie | GMA Network | Rico Gutierrez | Episode: Kristel: The Aswang Slayer |
| 2017–2018 | Impostora | Bettina "Betty" Romero | GMA Network | Albert Langitan, Aya Topacio | |
| 2017 | Dear Uge | Luz Reyes | GMA Network | Phillip Lazaro | Episode: Anak ni Ex |
| 2017 | Dear Uge | Beth | GMA Network | Mark Sicat Dela Cruz | Episode: Pinulot Ka Lang sa Gluta |
| 2018 | Dear Uge | Sophie | GMA Network | Lore Reyes | Episode: Utang Kang Naging Akin |
| 2018 | My Guitar Princess | Adele Raymundo | GMA Network | Nick Olanka | |
| 2018 | Tadhana: Saranghae | Genie | GMA Network | King Mark Baco | |
| 2019 | Dear Uge | Melanie | GMA Network | Tata Betita | Episode: Mid-Life Tsismis |
| 2019–2021 | Magkaagaw | Veronica "Veron" Razon-Santos | GMA Network | Gil Tejada Jr. | |
| 2020 | Wish Ko Lang! | Legal wife | GMA Network | Rommel Penesa | |
| 2020 | Himig ng Lahi Season 3 | Herself / Guest performer in Young Once Upon a Time segment | Net 25 | Various directors | |
| 2021 | Magpakailanman: Kaibigan sa Umaga, Aswang sa Gabi | Glorie | GMA Network | Frasco Mortiz | |
| 2021 | Agimat ng Agila | Dr. Myrna Labrador | GMA Network | Rico Gutierrez | |
| 2022 | Wish Ko Lang | Tess | GMA Network | Monti Parungao | |
| 2022 | Magpakailanman: The Illegal Wife | Sonya | GMA Network | Gina Alajar | |
| 2022–2023 | Prima Donnas Book 2 | Maria Kendra Fajardo-Claveria / Bethany Howards† | GMA Network | Gina Alajar, Philip Lazaro | |
| 2023 | Magpakailanman: Kinulam na Ina | Alma | GMA Network | Neal Del Rosario | |
| 2024 | Tadhana: Jackpot | Rachel | GMA Network | Jojo Nadela | |
| 2024–2025 | Lilet Matias: Attorney-at-Law | Patricia Valdes-Engaño† | GMA Network | Adolf Alix Jr. | |
| 2026 | Born to Shine | Giovanna "Vanna" Grande | GMA Network | Rod Marmol, Carlo Enciso Catu | |
| 2026 | Magpakailanman: Kahit Maputi Na Ang Buhok Mo | Mama Rose | GMA Network | Adolf Alix Jr. | |

=== Magazine covers & feature articles ===
- 1979 – Featured on the cover of Who? magazine, Vol. 1 No. 1, published April 28, 1979.
- 1979 – Featured on the cover of Liwayway magazine alongside Niño Muhlach during her early child star years.
- ‘’‘February 28, 1980’’’ – Featured on the cover of ‘‘Expressweek’’ magazine under the headline ‘’’“Sheryl Cruz: Pretty Rosebud.”’’’ The issue included the multi-page feature article ‘’’“Twinkle, Twinkle, Little Star,”’’’ which profiled Cruz’s emergence as one of Philippine entertainment’s youngest child stars and highlighted her early film career, including ‘‘Candy’’, as well as her family background as the daughter of Sampaguita Pictures stars Ricky Belmonte and Rosemarie Sonora.Lo, Ricky F. (February 28, 1980). "Twinkle, Twinkle, Little Star". Expressweek. p. 12.
- 1981 – Featured on the cover of Jingle Extra Hot entertainment magazine alongside fellow young stars.
- 1980s – Frequently featured in Kislap, Jingle Extra Hot, Songhits, Liwayway, Mirror Weekly, Mr. & Ms., Expressweek, and other Philippine entertainment and music magazines.
- 1980s – Featured on the cover of Songhits magazine during her recording career and teen idol years.
- 1982 – Featured in Miscellaneous magazine together with her mother, actress Rosemarie Sonora.
- 1989 – Featured on the cover of Liwayway magazine alongside Gabby Concepcion.
- 1989 – Featured on the cover of Liwayway magazine alongside Romnick Sarmenta and Richard Bonnin.
- 1990 – Featured on the cover of Liwayway magazine alongside Romnick Sarmenta.
- 1993 – Featured on the cover of Liwayway magazine alongside Romnick Sarmenta.
- 1993 – Featured on the cover of Woman Today magazine.
- 1990s – Featured on the cover of Mirror Weekly magazine during her short-haired fashion era.
- 1990s – Featured on the cover of Mr. & Ms. magazine alongside actor Lorenz Martinez (Renzo/Wowie).
- August 29, 1994 – Featured on the cover of True Horoscope Stories magazine (Vol. 8, No. 431), a Philippine komiks-magazine publication. The issue featured Sheryl Cruz as its cover personality and included the feature story “A Thousand Words.”

Citation: True Horoscope Stories, Vol. 8, No. 431, August 29, 1994 (cover and feature article; personal archival copy in the collection of Sheryl Cruz).

- March 28, 1995 – Featured on the cover of Mr. & Ms. magazine alongside prominent actresses of the era.
- 2013 – Featured in Good Housekeeping Philippines, discussing motherhood, music career, and advocacy work through the Paper for Now Foundation.
- 2019 – Featured on the cover of All Out (AO) digital lifestyle and contemporary pop culture magazine.
- 2024 – Featured in Saksi Ngayon newspaper entertainment section following her recognition as one of the Philippines’ Distinct Best TV Actress awardees.
- 2024 – Featured in Manila Standard coverage of the Philippines Distinct Men and Women of Excellence Awards.
- 2025 – Featured on the cover of BEST Magazine as part of the publication’s entertainment and celebrity features.

=== Books and publications ===
- Featured in Above the Crowd by Lorna Kalaw-Tirol, with artwork by Nonoy Marcelo.
- Included in books, compilations, and archival publications documenting Filipino celebrities and personalities of French descent alongside Rosemarie Sonora and Susan Roces.
- Included in entertainment history and Philippine pop culture archival collections documenting child stars, teen idols, and major entertainment personalities of the 1980s and 1990s.

=== Commercials, print advertisements and endorsements ===
- 1980s – Appeared in PSBank (Philippine Savings Bank) family-oriented print and television advertisements together with Ricky Belmonte, Rosemarie Sonora, Patrick Sonora, and Renzo/Wowie Cruz.
- 1980s – Appeared in Magnolia Fresh Chicken print advertisements and promotional campaigns together with Rosemarie Sonora.
- 1980s – Appeared in Johnson & Johnson shampoo commercials alongside Rosemarie Sonora.
- 1980s – Appeared in Colgate toothpaste television commercials and print advertisements with Rosemarie Sonora.
- 1980s – Featured in family-oriented advertising campaigns highlighting the real-life Belmonte–Sonora entertainment family.
- 1980s – Appeared in various Philippine television commercials and print advertisements during her child star and teen idol years.

=== Media recognition and legacy ===
- Recognized as part of one of Philippine entertainment’s prominent showbiz families, being the daughter of actors Ricky Belmonte and Rosemarie Sonora, and niece of actress Susan Roces.
- Recognized as one of the notable child stars of the late 1970s and 1980s who successfully transitioned into teen idol, singer, television actress, and dramatic actress roles.
- Frequently cited in retrospectives and archival features documenting Philippine popular culture, entertainment journalism, 1980s–1990s Philippine cinema, television history, and teen magazine culture.
- Recognized as one of the prominent actresses associated with the “That’s Entertainment” generation and the popular teen-oriented entertainment media era of the 1980s and 1990s.
- Her magazine covers, entertainment features, music publications, commercials, and archival pictorials are considered part of Philippine pop culture memorabilia and entertainment history collections.
- Her early commercials and print advertisements with Rosemarie Sonora are regarded as nostalgic examples of family-oriented Philippine advertising during the 1980s.
- Her career and legacy continue to be featured in archival social media retrospectives, entertainment publications, newspaper articles, fan collections, and vintage Philippine magazine preservation projects.
- Included in discussions and publications documenting Filipino personalities of French, Spanish, Chinese, and Jewish-Ilonggo heritage through the Sonora family lineage.

== Discography ==
=== Studio albums ===
- Sheryl (1989)
- Walang Ganyanan (1991)
- There's No Place Like Home (2009)
- Sa Puso Ay Ikaw Pa Rin (2014)

=== Group albums ===
- Must Be Heaven (1986, Ivory Records) – with Triplet
  - "Must Be Heaven"
  - "Words Get in the Way" (Miami Sound Machine cover)
  - "Oh, My Love"
  - "An Obsession (Over You)" – solo by Sheryl Cruz
  - "System Addict" – solo by Manilyn Reynes
  - "I Want You to Be Mine"
  - "The Greatest Love of All" (George Benson cover)
  - "Let's Wait Awhile" (Janet Jackson cover)
  - "Friends" – solo by Tina Paner
  - "Venus" (Shocking Blue cover)

=== Soundtrack appearances and theme songs ===
- Good Morning Sunshine Original Motion Picture Soundtrack (1980) – featured performer on the track "Nakapagtataka".
- I Have Three Hands Original Motion Picture Soundtrack (1985) – featured performer on the track "Jack & Jill".
- "Mananatili" – theme song for the Philippine airing of May Queen on GMA Network (2014).
- "Sa Puso Ay Ikaw Pa Rin" – theme song for the Philippine television drama Paraiso Ko'y Ikaw (2014).
- "Mr. Dreamboy" – song written by Snaffu Rigor and popularized by Sheryl Cruz.
- "Mr. Dreamboy" – reused as the theme song and soundtrack inspiration for the 2005 Star Cinema romantic comedy film Dreamboy, starring Piolo Pascual and Bea Alonzo.
- "Mr. Dreamboy" – featured in the soundtrack and referenced in the 2025 comedy film Mudrasta: Ang Beking Ina! starring Roderick Paulate.

=== Compilation appearances ===
- "Mr. Dreamboy" – included in the compilation album The Best of OPM Foxtrot (1997).
- "Mr. Dreamboy" – reissued in the digital release of The Best Of OPM Foxtrot by Various Artists.

=== Cover versions ===
- "Sabi Ko Na Nga Ba" – covered by saxophonist Jake Concepcion on the album Jake Concepcion Plays OPM, Vol. 1 (1990).
- "Sabi Ko Na Nga Ba" – covered by South Korean singer and actress Sandara Park for her 2004 album Sandara.

=== Legacy and cultural impact ===
Cruz's 1989 novelty-pop hit "Mr. Dreamboy" has remained part of Filipino popular culture decades after its release. The song experienced renewed popularity after being reused in the 2005 Star Cinema romantic comedy film Dreamboy, starring Piolo Pascual and Bea Alonzo.

The song has also continued to appear in Philippine television variety and singing programs, including performances on ABS-CBN entertainment shows decades after its original release.

Multiple entertainment and media sources continue to reference the song in discussions of Filipino pop nostalgia and OPM culture.

=== Live concerts and music specials ===
- Triplet Concert (2017)
  - with Tina Paner and Manilyn Reynes
  - held at the Music Museum, Greenhills, San Juan on September 9, 2017
  - featured reunion performances and classic hits from the former That's Entertainment stars
- Vibe Live (2026)
  - aired on TV5
  - held at the Meralco Theater, Ortigas Center, Pasig on February 8, 2026
  - directed by Johnny Manahan
  - performed "Sabi Ko Nga Ba" and "Mr. Dreamboy"

=== Television musical performances ===
- GMA Playlist (2017)
  - "Kaibigan" (with Tina Paner and Manilyn Reynes)
  - "Dear Friend" (with Tina Paner and Manilyn Reynes)
- Playlist Sessions (2018)
  - "Isang Tibok ng Puso" from My Guitar Princess
- That’s Quarantainment (2020)
  - "Nothing's Gonna Stop Us Now" (with Manilyn Reynes, Tina Paner, Janno Gibbs, Romnick Sarmenta, Keempee de Leon, and Monching Christopher)
- Virtual collaboration performance (2020)
  - "Breathless" by The Corrs (with Sunshine Cruz, Geneva Cruz, and Donna Cruz)

== Entrepreneurship and social advocacy ==
In 2012, Cruz founded ‘‘Paper For Now’’, a livelihood and environmental enterprise that produces woven bags and accessories made from recycled newspapers and magazines. The project provided employment opportunities for women, particularly mothers and community-based workers, while promoting recycling and sustainable craftsmanship.

‘‘Paper For Now’’ products were later featured in Kultura’s ‘‘Crafts for a Cause’’ program and exhibited at Manila FAME. Cruz personally participated in training, product development, and marketing efforts for the enterprise.

Since 2018, Cruz has served as a spokesperson and travel ambassador for Levy Travel & Tours, participating in promotional tourism campaigns and international group tours. Through the agency, she has represented destinations including Iceland, Turkey, India, Malta, and Italy, while promoting cultural exchange and Philippine outbound tourism.

In 2025, Cruz received multiple acting awards and recognitions from various local and international award-giving bodies. Entertainment publications reported her receiving honors including Outstanding Actress in Drama Series at the 5th Philippine Faces of Success Awards, Best TV Actress of the Year at the Gawad Dangal Awards and the 9th Asia Pacific Luminare Awards, Distinct TV Actress of the Year at the Distinct Men & Women of Excellence Awards, Most Outstanding Actress of the Year at the Global Excellence Leadership Awards, Actress of the Year and Hall of Fame recognition at the Diamond Excellence Awards, Outstanding Actress in Film and Television at the Global Trends Business Awards, and Asia's Outstanding TV Actress of the Year at the 2025 World Class Excellence Japan Awards. In June 2025, she was additionally recognized at the Asia Pacific Topnotch Men & Women Achievers Awards, where she received the Grand Slam TV Actress of the Year award, Female Face of the Night, and Ms. Asia Pacific Queen Actress honors.

== Awards and recognitions ==
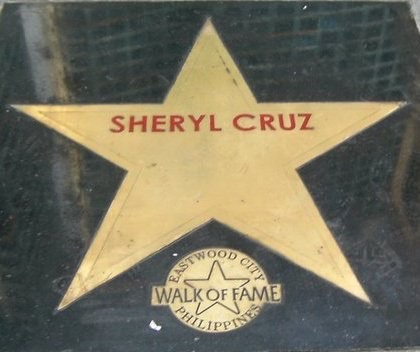
The Eastwood City Walk of Fame star of Filipino actress and singer Sheryl Cruz in Quezon City, Philippines.

=== FAMAS Awards ===
- 1981 – Nominated for FAMAS Award for Best Child Actress for Candy.
- 1982 – Won the FAMAS Award for Best Child Actress for Mga Basang Sisiw.
- 1983 – Won the FAMAS Award for Best Child Actress for Roman Rapido.
- 1984 – Nominated for FAMAS Award for Best Child Actress for Home Sweet Home.
- 1985 – Nominated for FAMAS Award for Best Child Actress for Lovingly Yours, Helen: The Movie.
- 1994 – Nominated for FAMAS Award for Best Actress for Ms. Dolora X.
- 1995 – Nominated for FAMAS Award for Best Actress for Paano Na? Sa Mundo ni Janet?.

=== Television and music recognitions ===
- 2007 – PMPC Star Awards for Television – Best Drama Actress nomination for Sinasamba Kita.
- 2015 – PMPC Star Awards for Television – Best Supporting Actress for Strawberry Lane.
- 2015 – PMPC Star Awards for Music – Female Pop Artist of the Year for the album Sa Puso Ko’y Ikaw Pa Rin.

=== Honors and recognitions ===
- 1980 – Won the Film Academy of the Philippines (FAP) Award for Best Child Performer.
- 1989 – Received the Guillermo Mendoza Memorial Scholarship Foundation (GMMSF) Award as Popular Teenage Queen of Philippine Movies, together with Romnick Sarmienta who was named Popular Teenage King of Philippine Movies.
- 1989 – Received a Gold Record Award from WEA Records for the album Sheryl.
- December 13, 1989 – Received a Platinum Record Award from WEA Records for the album Sheryl, after exceeding 40,000 album sales in the Philippines.
- February 8, 1990 – Received a Plaque of Appreciation from WEA Records for participation in the Kapayapaan project for the “Artists for Peace” movement.
- 2010 – Received a star at the Eastwood City Walk of Fame.
- December 2010 – Received a star at the Kapuso Walk of Fame at the GMA Network Center in Quezon City, recognizing her contributions to Philippine television and entertainment.
- 2016 – Outstanding Actress & Recording Artist – 36th People's Choice Awards for Entertainment.
- 2019 – Recognized by the Film Development Council of the Philippines (FDCP) as one of the "Love Teams of the Century" together with Romnick Sarmenta during Sine Sandaan, the official centennial celebration of Philippine cinema.
- 2024 – Philippines Distinct Men and Women of Excellence – Best TV Actress of the Year.
- July 2024 – Asia Pacific Luminaire Awards – Best TV Actress of the Year.
- 2024 – 5th Philippine Faces of Success – Outstanding Actress in a Drama Series.
- 2025 – Philippine Glitter Awards – Seasoned Actress of the Year.

- 2025 – Asia-Pacific Topnotch Men and Women Achievers Awards – Grand Slam TV Actress of the Year.
- 2025 – ModelMom Philippines 2025 Achievers Award – Honoree.
- 2026 – Huwarang Filipino Awards – “Seasoned Actress” honoree at the Huwarang Filipino Awards 2026: Decades of Excellence.
- 2026 – ModelMom 2026 Awardee.

=== Industry recognitions ===
- 2019 – Recognized by the Film Development Council of the Philippines (FDCP) as one of the "Love Teams of the Century" together with Romnick Sarmenta during Sine Sandaan, the official centennial celebration of Philippine cinema honoring approximately 300 luminaries of the Philippine film industry.

=== International recognitions ===
- 2023 – Received recognition from the Philippine Independence Day Committee (PIDC) in Washington, D.C. for contributions to Filipino cultural heritage and bayanihan.
- 2025 – Received the Star Icon Award for Lifetime Excellence in Acting and Musical Performance at the Global Filipino Icon Awards held in Dubai, United Arab Emirates.
- 2025 – Received the Asia's Outstanding TV Actress of the Year award for Lilet Matias: Attorney-at-Law at the World Class Excellence Japan Awards (WCEJA).

=== Television series recognitions ===
- Sinasamba Kita – PMPC Star Awards for Television (2007) – won Best Daytime Drama Series/Program
- Magkaagaw – PMPC Star Awards for Television (2021) – won Best Daytime Drama Series/Program
- Lilet Matias: Attorney-at-Law – 46th Catholic Mass Media Awards (2024) – won Best Drama Series/Program

=== Music ===
| Year | Award | Category | Work | Result |
|---|---|---|---|---|
| 2015 | PMPC Star Awards for Music | Female Recording Artist of the Year | Sa Puso Ko’y Ikaw Pa Rin | Nominated |
| 2015 | PMPC Star Awards for Music | Female Pop Artist of the Year | Sa Puso Ko’y Ikaw Pa Rin | Won |
| 2015 | PMPC Star Awards for Music | Song of the Year | "Mananatili" | Nominated |
