= Sergio Garcia (actor) =

Filipino actor, singer and dancer (born 1990)

- Born: April 10, 1990 (age 36); Philippines
- Occupations: Actor; dancer; singer
- Years active: 1995–2009; 2011

Sergio Garcia (born April 10, 1990) is a Filipino former actor and dancer. He was a member of teen singing and dance group Anim-E.

== Career ==
Aquino, along with fellow Anim-E members Emman Abeleda, Rayver Cruz, John Wayne Sace and Mico Aytona, with the exception of Mhyco Aquino, were child actors reintroduced as teen actors by ABS-CBN under Star Magic Batch 11.

== Filmography ==
=== Film ===
Year	Title	Role	Notes	Source
2001	Sugatang Puso	Andy		
2002	Dekada '70	Young Jules		
2003	Ang Tanging Ina	Bully		
2006	Shake, Rattle & Roll 8	Anton	Segment: "LRT"	
2007	Happy Hearts	Dancer	Non-speaking role	

=== Television ===
Year	Title	Role	Notes	Source
1995–96	Batang-X: The Series	Digo		
1995–97	Ang TV	Various roles		
2001	Ang TV 2	Various roles		
2001	Maalaala Mo Kaya		Episode: "Kapirasong Papel"	
2003–05	ASAP	Himself	Segment: "Anim-E/Anime"	
2003–05	Bida si Mister, Bida si Misis	Jun-Jun's classmate	Recurring role	
2005	Spirits	Bully no. 2		
2006	Komiks Presents: Pedro Penduko at ang mga Engkantao			
2006	Star Magic Presents	Jojo	Episode: "Ang Lovey Kong All Around"	
2006	Maalaala Mo Kaya		Episode: "Rugby"	
2008	Maalaala Mo Kaya	Ian's friend	Episode: "Sumbrero"	
2009	Midnight DJ	Student	Episode: "Highschool Sapi"	
2009	Kambal sa Uma	Edward		
2009	George and Cecil	George Castro Jr.	Guest, 1 episode	
2011	Mula sa Puso	Barkada	Uncredited	

== Awards and nominations ==
Year	Work	Organizatiom	Category	Result	Source
2004		Aliw Awards	Best Dance Group (Note: Shared with Emman Abeleda, Mhyco Aquino, John Wayne Sace, Mico Aytona and Rayver Cruz, as members of Star Magic's dance group Anim-E.)	Won	
2005		Aliw Awards	Best Dance Group (Note: Shared with Emman Abeleda, Mhyco Aquino, John Wayne Sace, Mico Aytona, Rodjun Cruz, Rayver Cruz and Miko Samson, as members of the expanded and renamed group Animé.)	Nominated	
