= Mary D' Potter =

- Title Card
- Genre: Comedy
- Written by: Gina Marissa Tagasa
- Directed by: Johnny Manahan
- Starring: Maricel Soriano
- Opening theme: "Mary D' Potter" by Anne Jomeo
- Country of origin: Philippines
- Original language: Filipino
- No. of episodes: 60

Production
- Executive producer: Victoria Soriano
- Running time: 42-75 minutes

Original release
- Network: ABS-CBN
- Release: September 15, 2001 – November 9, 2002

Related
- Kaya ni Mister, Kaya ni Misis; Bida si Mister, Bida si Misis

Mary D' Potter is a Philippine television fantasy sitcom series broadcast by ABS-CBN. Directed by Johnny Manahan, it stars Maricel Soriano. It aired on the network's Saturday evening line up from September 15, 2001 to November 9, 2002, replacing Pinoy Exposed and was replaced by Bida si Mister, Bida si Misis. It served as a spin-off of Kaya ni Mister, Kaya ni Misis. The title is a pun of J.K. Rowling's novel and film franchise Harry Potter.

The series is currently available on Jeepney TV's YouTube Channel.

== Plot ==
Mary Panyurutan, a young widow who supports her family—her Aunt Gelay, sister Geri, nephew Terry and daughter Kelly—by making and selling clay pots. In their community, Mary is a helpful, dedicated neighbor. What they don't know is that she has a secret identity, she is a white witch, whose mission is to do good and help others. She inherited her wizarding skills from her parents, who both worked in a traveling circus, but she turned her back on being a witch when she married her late husband.

In the end, all the events turned out to be just a dream of Mary Magtanggol while she and her husband Buboy Magtanggol were returning home to Manila from Australia.

== Cast ==
=== Main Cast ===
- Maricel Soriano as Mary Panyurutan/Mary Magtanggol

=== Supporting Cast ===
- Nova Villa as Nang Gelay
- Serena Dalrymple as Kelly Panyurutan
- Izza Ignacio as Jessa Sarabusab
- Roderick Paulate as Milton
- Mel Martinez as Terry
- Meryll Soriano as Geri
- Yuuki Kadooka as Buknoy
- Herbert Bautista as Kuling Sarabusab
- Cesar Montano as Buboy Magtanggol

== See also ==
- List of programs broadcast by ABS-CBN
