= Bida si Mister, Bida si Misis =

- Title card
- Genre: Situational comedy
- Created by: ABS-CBN; Diamond Star Production
- Directed by: Fritz Ynfante
- Starring: Cesar Montano; Maricel Soriano
- Opening theme: "Bida si Mister, Bida si Misis" by Cesar Montano and Maricel Soriano
- Country of origin: Philippines
- Original language: Filipino
- No. of episodes: 116

Production
- Executive producer: Nini Patricia S. Collada
- Running time: 1 hour

Original release
- Network: ABS-CBN
- Release: November 16, 2002 – February 8, 2005

Related
- Kaya ni Mister, Kaya ni Misis; Mary D' Potter

Bida si Mister, Bida si Misis (transl. husband is a hero, wife is a hero) is a Philippine television sitcom series broadcast by ABS-CBN. The series is sequel to Kaya ni Mister, Kaya ni Misis. Directed by Fritz Ynfante, it stars Cesar Montano and Maricel Soriano. It aired from November 16, 2002 to February 8, 2005, replacing Mary D' Potter and was replaced by Bora.

== Synopsis ==
The show follows the life of the Magtanggols after the events of the original show (Kaya ni Mister, Kaya ni Misis).

== Cast of characters ==
=== Main cast ===
- Maricel Soriano as Mary Magtanggol
- Cesar Montano as Buboy Magtanggol

=== Supporting cast ===
- Vhong Navarro as Bok Tyson
- Emman Abeleda as Jun-Jun Magtanggol
- Jane Oineza as Jackie Magtanggol
- Hyubs Azarcon as Puto
- Earl Ignacio as Marc
- George Javier as Chief George Pipay
- Shaina Magdayao as Shaina
- Smokey Manaloto as Wayne
- Bearwin Meily as Totoy
- Jenny Miller as Lovely
- Gloria Sevilla as Tiya Ina
- Alwyn Uytingco as Sherwin
- Empress Schuck as Empress
- Bentong as Bentong
- Mahal as Tiyang Mahal
- Froilan Sales
- John Wayne Sace, Sergio Garcia, Mhyco Aquino, Mico Aytona and Rayver Cruz as Jun-Jun's classmates

== See also ==
- List of programs broadcast by ABS-CBN
- Kaya ni Mister, Kaya ni Misis
