= Puso sa Puso =

1988 Filipino romantic drama film

- Directed by: Emmanuel H. Borlaza
- Written by: Humilde Roxas; Beybs Pizanno Gulfin
- Starring: Sheryl Cruz; Romnick Sarmenta; Ricky Belmonte; Liza Lorena; Helen Vela; Eddie Garcia; Perla Bautista; Cesar Montano; Jennifer Sevilla; Jaime Castillo
- Cinematography: Romy Vitug
- Edited by: Ike Jarlego Jr.
- Music by: Spanky Rigor
- Production company: Seiko Films
- Release date: May 25, 1988
- Country: Philippines
- Language: Filipino

Puso sa Puso (lit. 'Heart to Heart') is a 1988 Filipino romantic drama film directed by Emmanuel H. Borlaza and starring Sheryl Cruz, Romnick Sarmenta, Helen Vela, Ricky Belmonte, Liza Lorena, Perla Bautista, Cesar Montano, Jaime Castillo, Jennifer Sevilla, and Eddie Garcia. Produced by Seiko Films, the film was released on May 25, 1988. Critic Lav Diaz gave the film a mildly positive review.

== Plot ==
Daniel is a poor boy living in the slums with his mother Wilma and his younger sister. He falls in love with Rosel, a rich girl and an heiress to a business empire owned by Luisa. Their love affair gets doomed due to Luisa's dislike for Daniel. Her hatred towards Daniel got more intense when she learns that he is the son of her rival Wilma. Both Wilma and Luisa fell in love with the same man at one point in their lives who turned out to be Daniel's father. This drove Luisa to initiate a demolition at the squatter's area where Daniel and his mother Wilma were living. Wilma and her neighbors tried to prevent a demolition but a stampede occurs where she dies.

Because of the events that transpired, Rosel offers an apology to Daniel on her mother's behalf during Wilma's wake. Daniel then resolves to find a job so that he and his younger sister can survive the hard life that they have now. After several job application rejections, Daniel found his way to a company owned by a wealthy man who liked Daniel's work ethic as days went by, as it reminded him of his younger self. But when he later on finds out that he was the son of his late daughter Wilma, he tells Daniel his story about how he banished his daughter for marrying a poor man and regretted his actions later. Upon telling Daniel of his real identity, he apologized to his grandson and makes up for it by uprooting him and his younger sister out of the squatter's area to live with him at his mansion.

With his newfound wealth, Daniel pursues Rosel once more and assures her that their social gap is no longer a hindrance to their love. But Luisa, having learned that Rosel was still seeing Daniel, arrives with a gun on her hand and shoots Daniel on the shoulder. Rosel was enraged at what happened and disowns her mother. Luisa leaves the scene with a heavy heart and drove home when an accident occurs and claims her life. After recovering from the gunshot wound, Daniel visits Luisa's grave with Rosel and her father. Rosel and her father both asked Daniel to forgive Luisa for the wrong that she has done, to which Daniel accepts.

== Cast ==
- Sheryl Cruz as Rosel
- Romnick Sarmenta as Daniel
- Helen Vela as Wilma, Daniel's mother
- Ricky Belmonte as Rosel's father
- Liza Lorena as Luisa, Rosel's mother
- Perla Bautista
- Cesar Montano as Noel
- Jaime Castillo
- Jennifer Sevilla
- Eddie Garcia as Daniel's grandfather
- Janet Giron
- Don Pepot
- Metring David
- Renato del Prado
- Romeo Enriquez
- Fred Moro
- Michelle Christian
- Eva Ramos

== Release ==
Puso sa Puso was released on May 25, 1988, and became a box office success.

=== Critical response ===
Lav Diaz, writing for the Manila Standard, gave Puso sa Puso a mildly positive review. Although he found the film's story of a romance between a rich girl and a poor boy to be clichéd ("gasgas") even with the various turns its plot takes, Diaz stated that "thank goodness we were saved by singing, dancing and zombies in this film. Whew."
