= Ang Yaman ni Lola =

Philippine television reality show

- Title card
- Genre: Comedy; Reality show
- Directed by: Dante Nico Garcia
- Starring: Nanette Inventor
- Country of origin: Philippines
- Original language: Tagalog
- No. of episodes: 100

Production
- Executive producers: Cris Adonis Pira; Luzviminda Balingit
- Camera setup: Multiple-camera setup
- Running time: 25 minutes
- Production company: GMA News and Public Affairs

Original release
- Network: GMA Network
- Release: August 23, 2010 – January 21, 2011

Ang Yaman ni Lola (transl. the wealth of grandmother) is a Philippine television comedy reality show broadcast by GMA Network. Starring Nanette Inventor, it premiered on August 23, 2010 on the network's Dramarama sa Hapon line up. The show concluded on January 21, 2011, with a total of 100 episodes.

== Cast and characters ==
Cast

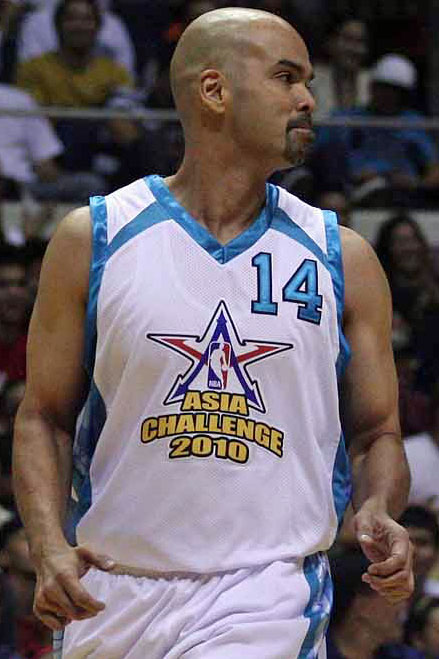
Benjie Paras

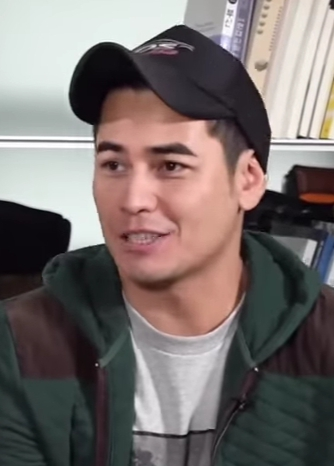
Fabio Ide

Lead cast

- Nanette Inventor as Barbara "Barbie" Benitez

Supporting cast

- Sheryl Cruz as Kimberly Hechanova Cabagnot
- Benjie Paras as Benjo Cabagnot
- Fabio Ide as Boggart
- Patricia Ismael as Mayordoma
- Joyce Ching as Cheska Hechanova Cabagnot
- Aaron Novilla as Agapito Hechanova Cabagnot

== Ratings ==
According to AGB Nielsen Philippines' Mega Manila People/Individual television ratings, the pilot episode of Ang Yaman ni Lola earned a 5.5% rating.
