= Nanette Inventor =

Philippines comedian, singer and actress

- Born: Agnes Inventor; June 23, 1954 (age 71); Manila, Philippines
- Occupations: Comic actress and singer
- Known for: 1980s role as Doña Buding

Nanette Inventor (born June 23, 1954) is a Filipino comedian, actress, singer, composer and writer.

== Early life ==
Nanette Inventor was born in Manila, capital of the Philippines. She had two sisters and a brother. She studied at the University of the Philippines Diliman with the intention of joining the diplomatic service of the Philippines. Starting singing in church at the age of seven and trained in classical singing, she continued while at university. She went on the 1974 and 1978 tours of the University of the Philippines Concert Chorus (UPCC) to the US and Europe, together with other future stars, such as Chinggoy Alonso. In joining the chorus, she disobeyed her lawyer father, who warned her there was no money in singing.

== Career ==
Initially a jingle singer and a backing vocalist for Celeste Legaspi, Basil Valdez, and Leah Navarro, among others, Inventor was discovered by a television producer who saw her performing in a musical and enjoyed her humour. The story goes that she was given a script and told that she would be performing live on television that week. She became famous playing a character called Doña Buding, a gauche, nouveau riche social climber, on the television show, The Penthouse Live!, premiering in the role on November 14, 1983. Not the original choice for the role, she got the job when the first choice was injured in a road accident and she was recommended by another actress, Tessie Tomas.

Although she continued singing, winning the grand prize at the 7th Metro Manila Popular Music Festival in 1984, and becoming the first Filipina to sing at Carnegie Hall in New York City, alongside the all-male APO Hiking Society, she became better known as a comedian. Doing stand-up shows she blended comedy with music, earning her the title "The Funny Lady of Songs". However, in 2012, she joined the UPCC on its golden anniversary tour of the US, and in June and July 2016 she joined it again for another tour in the US. Also in 2016, she sang with a Big band for the first time.

Inventor is a frequent performer of stand-up and music shows in the Philippines and the US, usually to Filipino audiences. She has appeared in many films and in television series. She is also a university lecturer, teaching communication skills at the Philippine Christian University in Ermita, Manila since around 2000 and also teaching at the Wesleyan University Philippines.

== Filmography ==
=== Television ===
- 1982: The Penthouse Live! (Starring role)
- 1987: Tawag ng Tanghalan
- 1991: Abangan Ang Susunod Na Kabanata
- 2001: Better Home Ideas (substitute host)
- 2008: Dyesebel
- 2009: Flash Bomba
- 2010–2011: Ang Yaman ni Lola (Starring role)
- 2010: Panday Kids
- 2013-2014: Madam Chairman
- 2014: My Destiny
- 2015–2016: On the Wings of Love
- 2015: Relationship
- 2021: Niña Niño
- 2023: Love Before Sunrise
- 2025: Ang Mutya ng Section E

=== Film ===
- 1980: Kakabakaba Ka Ba? (Are You Nervous?)
- 1982: Batch '81
- 1992: Ano ba Yan?
- 1995: Run Barbi Run
- 1997: Honey, Nasa Langit na ba ako?
- 2007: One More Chance
- 2008: Ikaw Pa Rin: Bongga Ka Boy
- 2015: Miss Bulalacao
- 2015: Buy Now, Die Later
- 2017: Ang Larawan
- 2021: General Admission
- 2025: 100 Awit Para Kay Stella
