= Ricky Belmonte =

Filipino actor (1947–2001)

- Born: Jesus Velez Cruz; December 24, 1947; Tondo, Manila, Philippines
- Died: October 3, 2001 (aged 53); Parañaque, Philippines
- Resting place: La Loma Cemetery
- Occupation: Actor
- Years active: 1966–2001
- Spouse: Rosemarie Sonora (m. 1970; sep. 1986)
- Children: 3 (including Sheryl)
- Relatives: Rodjun Cruz (nephew); Rayver Cruz (nephew); Donna Cruz (niece); Sunshine Cruz (niece); Geneva Cruz (niece); Tirso Cruz III (cousin); Woody Cruz (cousin); Danny Cruz (brother); Elizabeth Cruz (sister)

Jesus Velez Cruz (Tagalog pronunciation: [ˈkɾus]; December 24, 1947 – October 3, 2001), better known by his stage name Ricky Belmonte, was a Filipino actor, popular during the 1960s as one of Sampaguita Pictures' talents.

== Personal life ==
Belmonte was born as Jesus Velez Cruz on December 24, 1947 in Tondo, Manila to Cesar Cruz, Sr. and Milagros Velez. His screen surname was taken from the Belmontes, STAR magazine publishers who, in the 1960s, used to publish several movie magazines like Movie World, Movie Land, Movie Star, among others.

== Family ==
He was survived by his three children - Renzo, Sheryl, and Patrick - by his marriage to actress Rosemarie Sonora from 1970 to 1986.

== Filmography ==
=== Film ===
Year	Title	Role
1966	Viva Ranchera	
1966	Si Siyanang at ang 7 Tsikiting	
1967	Dedicated to You	
1967	Let's Dance the Soul!	
1967	Bus Stop	
1967	Way Out in the Country	
1967	Cinderella A-Go-Go	
1968	Sandwich Shindig	
1968	May Tampuhan Paminsan Minsan	
1968	Junior Castillo	
1968	Let's Go Hippie	
1968	Juanita Banana	
1968	Ikaw Ay Akin, Ako Ay sa Iyo	
1968	Doon Pa sa Amin	
1968	Magic Guitar	
1969	Young Girl	
1969	YeYe Generation	
1969	Oh, Delilah!	
1969	Jinkee	
1969	Bittersweet	David
1969	9 Teeners	
1970	Ricky Na, Tirso Pa!	
1970	Love Is for the Two of Us	
1970	Tayo'y Mag-Up, Up and Away	
1970	Gintong Alaala	
1970	First Kiss	
1970	The Young at Heart	
1971	My Prayer	
1971	Life Everlasting	Dante
1972	Just Married, Do Not Disturb	
1974	La Paloma: Ang Kalapating Ligaw	Don Lorenzo
1974	Bawal: Asawa Mo, Asawa Ko	
1975	Prrt! Huli Ka!	
1975	Mag-Ingat Kapag Biyuda ang Umibig	
1975	At Lumaganap ang Lagim	
1975	Ang Madugong Daigdig ni Salvacion	
1976	Tatlong Kasalanan	
1976	Daluyong at Habagat	Habagat
1976	Iniibig Kita... Father Salvador	
1977	Babae!	
1977	Nananabik	
1978	Buhay: Ako sa Itaas, Ikaw sa Ibaba	
1978	Isang Kahig, Isang Tuka	
1979	Kuwatog	
1980	Bomba Star	Joey
1980	Nympha	
1980	Temptation Island	Ricardo
1980	Waikiki: Sa Lupa ng Ating Mga Pangarap	Chito
1980	Tembong	
1981	Tropang Bulilit	
1981	Wild	
1982	Puppy Love	
1982	Campus Beat	
1987	Working Girls 2	Leo Cordova
1987	Bata-Batuta	
1988	Puso sa Puso	
1988	Natutulog Pa ang Diyos	Mike Velasco
1989	Anak ng Demonyo	
1990	Kunin Mo ang Ulo ni Ismael	
1990	Kung Tapos Na ang Kailanman	
1990	Island of Desire	
1991	Ama, Bakit Mo Ako Pinabayaan?	
1994	The Untold Story: Vizconde Massacre II - May the Lord Be with Us!	
1997	Winasak Na Pangarap	
1997	Isinakdal Ko ang Aking Ina	
1997	Frats	
1998	Hamog sa Magdamag	
1998	Kahit Saan, Kung Puwede	
1998	Tulak ng Bibig, Kabig ng Dibdib	
2002	Eskandalosa	

=== Television ===
Year	Title	Role
1989–1994	Anna Luna	Arnulfo Corpus
2001–2002	Sa Dulo ng Walang Hanggan	Badong (His last TV appearance)

== Death ==
He died on October 3, 2001, in a hospital at Medical Center Parañaque in Parañaque, four days after cerebral hemorrhage caused by a massive stroke, he was 53 and was buried at the La Loma Cemetery in Caloocan.
