= Tinig =

2006 Philippine television drama series

- Also known as: Sonata of Heart
- Genre: Drama; Musical
- Developed by: Don Michael Perez
- Written by: Kit Villanueva-Langit; Des Garbes-Severino; Luningning Interio-Ribay
- Directed by: Mac Alejandre
- Starring: Yasmien Kurdi
- Theme music composer: Vince de Jesus
- Opening theme: "Now and Forever" by Kyla
- Country of origin: Philippines
- Original language: Tagalog
- No. of episodes: 68

Production
- Executive producer: Camille Pengson
- Camera setup: Multiple-camera setup
- Running time: 30 minutes
- Production company: GMA Entertainment TV

Original release
- Network: GMA Network
- Release: January 9 – April 12, 2006

Tinig (transl. voice / international title: Sonata of Heart) is a 2006 Philippine television drama series broadcast by GMA Network. The series is the fourth installment of Now and Forever. Directed by Mac Alejandre, it stars Yasmien Kurdi. It premiered on January 9, 2006. The series concluded on April 12, 2006, with a total of 68 episodes.

== Cast and characters ==
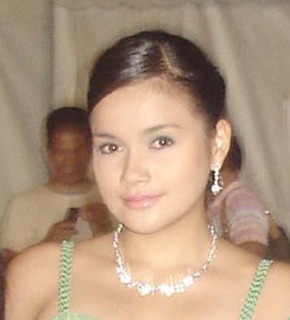
Yasmien Kurdi portrays Victoria.

Lead cast

- Yasmien Kurdi as Victoria / Ikay

Supporting cast

- Sheryl Cruz as Selena
- Gary Estrada as Angelo
- Jay Aquitania as Joko
- Neil Ferreira as Macky
- Danica Sotto-Pingris as Tiffany
- Tin Arnaldo as Maribel
- Ailyn Luna as Corrine
- Jennifer Sevilla as Yvone
- Ian Veneracion as Juan Miguel
- Allan Paule as Renato
- Jan Marini as Remedios
- Dino Guevarra as Benjie
- Irma Adlawan as Noemi
- Richard Quan as Edgar

Guest cast

- Sandy Talag as younger Ikay

== Accolades ==
Accolades received by Tinig
Year	Award	Category	Recipient	Result	Ref.
2006	20th PMPC Star Awards for Television	Best Daytime Drama Series	Tinig	Won	
