= Rodjun Cruz =

Filipino actor, dancer, and singer (born 1987)

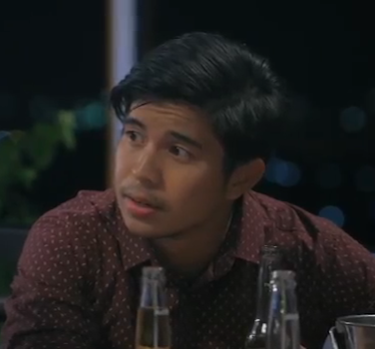
- Cruz on Eat Bulaga! in 2017
- Born: Rodolfo Othello Cruz Ilustre Jr. October 10, 1987 (age 39); Las Piñas, Metro Manila, Philippines
- Education: Saint Francis of Assisi College
- Occupations: Actor; dancer; singer
- Years active: 1993–present
- Agents: Star Magic; Sparkle
- Spouse: Dianne Medina (m. 2019)
- Children: 2
- Relatives: Sheryl Cruz (cousin); Sunshine Cruz (cousin); Donna Cruz (cousin); Geneva Cruz (cousin); Tirso Cruz III (uncle); Ricky Belmonte (uncle)
- Family: Rayver Cruz (brother)

Rodolfo Othello Cruz Ilustre Jr. (born October 10, 1987), known professionally as Rodjun Cruz (Tagalog pronunciation: [ˈkɾus]), is a Filipino actor, singer, and dancer. He is currently an exclusive artist of GMA Network and Sparkle.

== Biography ==
Cruz started as a host, together with his younger brother Rayver, in the children's magazine show 5 and Up. Cruz was a member of the now defunct all-male dancing group Anim-E. The group, previously named Anime—in reference to the Tagalog word "anim" or "six"—originally consisted six members namely: Rayver Cruz, John Wayne Sace, Emman Abeleda, Sergio Garcia, Mico Aytona, and Mhyco Aquino. Rodjun joined the original members in 2005.

In 2006, he was cast as Jigo in the ABS-CBN TV series Calla Lily.

After a year, Cruz along with 14 other celebrity contestants joined the second season of U Can Dance Version 2, where he met and started dating fellow Star Magic talent Dianne Medina. Cruz with his dancing partner Lina Basas were named Grand Champion of U Can Dance Version 2 the following year, where he won the grand prize of 250,000 pesos. He also won another 250,000 pesos from the "Merrygalo" segment of, the now defunct noontime variety show, Wowowee. He made a guest appearance in the "Mambabarang" episode of Komiks Presents: Pedro Penduko at ang mga Engkantao in the same year.

In 2008, Cruz was cast as Jake Perez in the teen drama Lipgloss.

Cruz left Lipgloss after three seasons in 2009. He had minor roles in the ABS-CBN shows Tayong Dalawa and May Bukas Pa. He also made guest appearances in Maynila and Midnight DJ.

He played Calvin in Magkaribal in 2010. He was also cast as Joaquin Buenaventura in Juanita Banana. The same year, he left ASAP XV and joined, the show's rival, P.O.5 in TV5.

== Other ventures ==
=== Business ===
In 2021, Cruz and his family launched their sports apparel brand, CruzFit which includes hoodies, hoodies shirts, training shirts for men and women, caps and face masks.

Cruz and his wife, Dianne Medina, invested in the real estate business and bought a house in BF Homes Parañaque, which is a rental property. The couple expanded their rental house business and bought another property, a 2-Storey house which is located in Quezon City.

== Personal life ==
Cruz is a cousin of entertainers Sheryl Cruz, Sunshine Cruz, Geneva Cruz and Donna Cruz.

In October 2017, Cruz announced his engagement to actress Dianne Medina after dating since July 23, 2007. The couple married on December 21, 2019. In April 2020, they announced that they were expecting their first child together.

== Filmography ==
=== Television ===
Year	Title	Role	Notes	Source
1993–2002	5 and Up	Himself – Host		
2005–2010	ASAP	Himself – Host / Performer		
2006	Calla Lily	Jigo		
2007	U Can Dance Version 2	Himself – Contestant	Grand Champion (season 2)	
2007	Komiks Presents: Pedro Penduko at ang mga Engkantao	Rickey		
2008–2009	Lipgloss	Jake Perez		
2009	Tayong Dalawa	Stanley, Jr.		
2009	May Bukas Pa	Young Ringo		
2009	Maalaala Mo Kaya	Anton	Episode: "Tattoo"	
2009	Midnight DJ	Miguel	Episode: "Mambabarang"	
2010	Magkaribal	Calvin		
2010–2011	Juanita Banana	Joaquin Buenaventura		
2010–2011	P.O.5	Himself – Host / Performer		
2011	Fan*tastik	Himself	Himself - Performer	
2011	Maalaala Mo Kaya	Isyot	Episode: "Bulaklak"	
2011–2012	Hey it's Saberdey!	Himself - Performer		
2011	Carlo J. Caparas' Bangis	Musang		
2011	Maalaala Mo Kaya	Rene	Episode: "Itak"	
2012	Maalaala Mo Kaya	Jeff Bringas	Episode: "Saklay"	
2012	Maalaala Mo Kaya	Teen Lito	Episode: "Kabibe"	
2013	My Husband's Lover	Martin Savanal	Recurring guest star	
2013–2015	Sunday All Stars	Himself – Performer		
2014	Ang Dalawang Mrs. Real	Allan Real	Supporting Cast	
2014	Magpakailanman		Episode: "Girl Boy Bakla, Tomboy"	
2015	My Faithful Husband	Young Arnaldo	Special Participation	
2015	Maynila		Episode: "Love vs Dreams"	
2015	Maynila	Rainier	Episode: "My Imported GF"	
2015	Princess in the Palace	Kenneth		
2015	Magpakailanman	Shem	Episode: "Love Me for What I Am"	
2016	Karelasyon	Ricky	Episode: "Nagjakol"	
2016	The Story of Us	Gino		
2016	Conan, My Beautician	Prince	Guest	
2016	Karelasyon	Michael	Episode: "Webcam"	
2016	Magpakailanman	Paul	Episode: "Sa Kabila ng Lahat, Ikaw Pa Rin"	
2016	A1 Ko Sa 'Yo	Johnny / Juanito	Episode guest	
2016	Karelasyon	Arman	Episode: "Anino"	
2016	Encantadia	PaoPao (warrior form)		
2016	Dear Uge	James Villamayor	Episode: "GGSS vs. GGSS "	
2017	Legally Blind	Joel Apostol		
2017	Daig Kayo ng Lola Ko	Arnulfo		
2017	Love is...	John		
2017	Road Trip	Himself / Guest		
2018	The One That Got Away	Hugo		
2018	Hindi Ko Kayang Iwan Ka	Edward Salazar		
2018	Daddy's Gurl	Bomber		
2018	Magpakailanman	Elmer	Episode: "Impiyerno sa Dagat: A True Story of Filipino Bravery and Preserverance"	
2019	TODA One I Love	Robert		
2019	Hanggang sa Dulo ng Buhay Ko	Ben Dela Cruz		
2019	Maynila	Apollo	Episode: My Little Angel	
2019–2020	One of the Baes	Martin Rivera		
2020–present	All-Out Sundays	Himself – Performer		
2021	My Fantastic Pag-ibig	Amadeus / Amado	Episode: "Love Wars"	
2022	Little Princess	Jaxon Pineda		
2023	Mga Lihim ni Urduja	Min Feng		
2023	Love Before Sunrise	Enrico "Rico" Domingo		
2024	Jose & Maria's Bonggang Villa 2.0	Fabio		
2024	My Guardian Alien	dancer		
2024	Abot-Kamay na Pangarap	Dr. Gabby Cifra		
2025	Stars on the Floor	Himself - Contestant	Grand Champion (season 1)	
2026	Sanggang-Dikit FR	Nestor Baltazar		
2026	Born to Shine	Jaime		
2026	Taskforce Firewall			

== Awards and nominations ==
Year	Work	Award	Category	Result	Source
2012	I Love You, Pare Ko	Carlo			
2013	Raketeros				
2013	Tuhog	Mark			
