= Emman Abeleda =

Filipino actor, singer and dancer (born 1989)

- Born: September 17, 1989 (age 37); Taguig, Metro Manila, Philippines
- Occupations: Actor; dancer; singer
- Years active: 1995–2005

Emman Abeleda is a Filipino former actor, singer and dancer.

== Career ==
Abeleda practically grew up on screen, he first started appearing on films as early as 1996. As a child actor, he often portrayed son and younger brother roles.

On television, he first appeared as Jun-Jun Estrera in the soap opera Esperanza all the while appearing in the sitcom Kaya ni Mister, Kaya ni Misis—both shows started running from 1997 and ending respectively in 1999 and 2001.

From 1997 to 1999, Abeleda appeared in Flames: The Movie (Pangako), Haba Baba Doo, Puti Puti Poo and the Christmas film Puso ng Pasko. First earning his FAMAS Awards nomination in 1998 for Minsan Lamang Magmamahal.

In 2003, he would reprise his role as Jun-Jun, the son of Maricel Soriano and Cesar Montano's characters in Kaya ni Mister, Kaya ni Misis, in the sequel series Bida si Mister, Bida si Misis. In the same year, Abeleda started performing with Sergio Garcia, Mhyco Aquino, Rayver Cruz, John Wayne Sace and Mico Aytona. as a group. The group composed mostly of former child actors, would eventually be introduced as singing and dancing teen idol Anim-E the following year and were mainstays in the weekly variety show ASAP.

He was retired from Showbiz in 2005.

== Filmography ==
=== Film ===
Year	Title	Role	Notes	Source
1996	May Nagmamahal sa Iyo	Leonard (5 y/o)		
1996	Rubberman	Younger brother		
1996	Istokwa	Dot-Dot		
1996	Da Best in da West 2: Da Western Pulis Istori	Larry's son	Credited as "Emmanuel Abeleda"	
1996	Bitag	Ivan		
1997	Ako ba ang nasa Puso Mo	Young Ariel		
1997	Flames: The Movie	Sammy	Segment: "Pangako"	
1997	Minsan Lamang Magmamahal	Miguel		
1998	Haba Baba Doo! Puti Puti Poo!	Emman		
1998	Puso ng Pasko	Christopher		
1999	Higit pa sa Buhay Ko	Jun-Jun Bernardo		
1999	Esperanza: The Movie	Jun-Jun Estrera		

=== Television ===
Year	Title	Role	Notes	Source
1996–1997	Ang TV	Himself/Cast Member		
1997–1999	Esperanza	Jun-Jun Estrera		
1997	Kaybol: Ang Bagong TV	Himself/Cast Member		
1997	Maalaala Mo Kaya		Episode: "Entablado"	
1997	Maalaala Mo Kaya		Episode: "Haplos sa Sugat"	
1997	Flames		Episode: "I Hate Boys, I Hate Girls"	
1997	Hiraya Manawari	Emil	Episode: "Ang Lihim ng Rani"	
1997–2001	Kaya ni Mister, Kaya ni Misis	Jun-Jun		
1998	Maalaala Mo Kaya		Episode: "Pampang"	
1998	Wansapanataym		Episode: "Konsesnya"	
1999	!Oka Tokat		Episode: "Nuno Bear"	
1999	Wansapanataym		Episode: "Komiks"	
1999–2003	Tabing Ilog	Mario Magtibay		
1999	Maalaala Mo Kaya		Episode: "Inakay"	
1999–2000, 2001	Epol/Apple	Kenneth		
2000	Maalaala Mo Kaya		Episode: "Keyboard"	
2000	Wansapanataym		Episode: "Madyik Pinggan ATBP."	
2000	Wansapanataym	Pencil	Episode: "Anong Gusto Mong Maging?"	
2001	Maalaala Mo Kaya		Episode: "Burda"	
2001	Recuerdo de Amor	Young Paulo Jose Villafuerte		
2002–2005	Bida si Mister, Bida si Misis	Jun-Jun		
2002	Maalaala Mo Kaya		Episode: "Dictionary"	
2002–2004	Kapalaran	Henry		
2003	Maalaala Mo Kaya	Chester	Episode: "Garapon"	
2003–2005	ASAP	Himself	Segment: "Anim-E/Anime"	

== Awards and nominations ==
Year	Work	Organizatiom	Category	Result	Source
1998	Minsan Lamang Magmamahal	FAMAS Awards	Best Child Actor	Nominated	
1999	Puso ng Pasko	FAMAS Awards	Best Child Actor	Nominated	
2000	Higit pa sa Buhay Ko	FAMAS Awards	Best Child Actor	Nominated	
2000	Esperanza: The Movie	FAMAS Awards	Best Child Actor	Nominated	
2004		Aliw Awards	Best Dance Group (Note: Shared with Sergio Garcia, Mhyco Aquino, John Wayne Sace, Mico Aytona and Rayver Cruz, as members of Star Magic's Anim-E.)	Won	
2005		Aliw Awards	Best Dance Group (Note: Shared with Sergio Garcia, Mhyco Aquino, John Wayne Sace, Mico Aytona, Rodjun Cruz, Rayver Cruz and Miko Samson, as members of the expanded and renamed group Animé.)	Nominated	
