= Kaya ni Mister, Kaya ni Misis =

- Title card
- Genre: Sitcom
- Written by: Rhandy Reyes
- Directed by: Johnny Manahan
- Starring: Maricel Soriano; Cesar Montano
- Country of origin: Philippines
- Original language: Tagalog
- No. of episodes: 224

Production
- Executive producers: Dagang V. Vilbar; Becbec Soriano
- Running time: 60 minutes
- Production companies: ABS-CBN Studios; Diamond Star Production

Original release
- Network: ABS-CBN
- Release: May 19, 1997 – September 3, 2001

Related
- Kung Kaya Mo, Kaya Ko Rin; Mary D' Potter; Bida si Mister, Bida si Misis

Kaya ni Mister, Kaya ni Misis (transl. husband can do it, wife can do it) is a Philippine television sitcom series broadcast by ABS-CBN. The series is based on the 1996 Philippine film Kung Kaya Mo, Kaya Ko Rin. Directed by Johnny Manahan, it stars Maricel Soriano and Cesar Montano. It aired from May 19, 1997, to September 3, 2001, replacing The Maricel Drama Special and was replaced by the Monday slot of Home Along Da Riles.

Only fast-cuts of the series is available on Jeepney TV's YouTube channel.

== Synopsis ==
Buboy, a police, struggles to balance his demanding work and equally demanding bigmouthed, high-maintenance wife, Mary and their family's life.

Buboy and Mary are known as the "now you see them sweet, now you don't" couple.

== Cast ==
=== Main Cast ===
- Maricel Soriano as Mary Magtanggol
- Cesar Montano as Buboy Magtanggol

=== Supporting Cast ===
- Nova Villa as Gregoria "Goring" Magtanggol
- Luis Gonzales as Luisito "Louie" Galang
- Bayani Agbayani as Joe Tyson
- Izza Ignacio as Magdalena "Elena" Reyna
- Meryll Soriano as Betchay
- Emman Abeleda as Jun-Jun Magtanggol
- Migui Moreno as Migui
- Nicole Andersson as Renee
- Sammy Lagmay as Tiyong Boogie
- Bentong as Bentong
- Carding Castro as Mario
- Edcel Cau as Boy Dumi

=== Guest cast ===
- Gary Lising
- Anthony Roquel
- Bembol Roco
- Angelika Dela Cruz
- Wowie de Guzman
- Sunshine Cruz
- Malou De Guzman
- CJ Ramos
- Cheska Garcia
- Stephen Alonzo
- Jolina Magdangal
- Rez Cortez
- Lou Veloso
- Hideo Noguchi
- Richard Quan
- Rey Kilay
- Vivorah
- Martin Mijares
- Arnell Tamayo
- Subas Herrero
- Carmina Villarroel
- Joel Torre
- Jaime Fabregas
- Rita Avila
- Tirso Cruz III
- Carol Banawa
- Efren Reyes Jr.
- Romnick Sarmenta
- Sylvia Sanchez
- Emilio Garcia
- Jestoni Alarcon
- Berting Labra
- April Boy Regino
- Mon Confiado
- Carmi Martin
- Lito Legaspi
- Romy Diaz
- Ruel Vernal
- Chuck Perez
- Dennis Roldan
- Eula Valdez
- Anita Linda
- Bella Flores
- Gandong Cervantes
- Gilleth Sandico
- Zoren Legaspi
- Dante Rivero
- Baron Geisler
- John Regala
- Ana Capri
- Winnie Cordero
- Giselle Sanchez
- Ronnie Lazaro
- Angelica Panganiban
- Kier Legaspi
- Niña de Sagun
- Gladys Reyes
- Sheila Marie Rodriguez
- Brando Legaspi
- Tommy Abuel

== Critical response ==
Veron Dioniso of the Philippine Daily Inquirer noted that the couple depicts Mary as a stereotypical housewife and always ends up apologizing to her husband at the end of the episodes.

== Spin-off and Sequel ==
=== Spin-off ===
In 2001, spin-off of Kaya ni Mister, Kaya ni Misis titled Mary D' Potter premiered in ABS-CBN.

=== Sequel ===
In 2002, sequel of Kaya ni Mister, Kaya ni Misis titled Bida si Mister, Bida si Misis premiered in ABS-CBN.

== See also ==
- List of programs broadcast by ABS-CBN
- Bida si Mister, Bida si Misis
