= Puso ng Pasko =

1998 Christmas fantasy film by Peque Gallaga and Lore Reyes

- Theatrical poster
- Directed by: Peque Gallaga; Lore Reyes
- Written by: Peque Gallaga; Paul Daza; Lore Reyes
- Produced by: Charo Santos-Concio; Marilou Billones; Eric M. Cuatico
- Starring: Jason Salcedo; Justin Simoy; Korinne Lirio; Emman Abeleda; Jacklyn Jose; Rita Avila; Jolina Magdangal; Edu Manzano; Cherry Pie Picache
- Cinematography: Richard Padernal
- Edited by: Danny Gloria
- Music by: Marc Aramian
- Production companies: Star Cinema; Tikbalang Productions
- Distributed by: Star Cinema
- Release date: December 25, 1998
- Running time: 112 minutes
- Country: Philippines
- Language: Filipino

Puso ng Pasko (lit. 'Heart of Christmas') is a 1998 Filipino Christmas fantasy comedy-drama film written and directed by Peque Gallaga and Lore Reyes from a story and screenplay they co-wrote with Paul Daza. It stars Jason Salcedo, Justin Simoy, Korinne Lirio, Emman Abeleda, and Jolina Magdangal.

Produced by Tikbalang Productions and Star Cinema, who also handles the distribution, the film served as an official entry for the 24th Metro Manila Film Festival and was released on December 25, 1998. Throughout its run, the film became one of the film festival edition's top grossers.

== Plot ==
This story is about the Carpio family and their struggle to save their home during the Christmas season.

The family revolved around the loving couple, Ophelia (Cherry Pie Picache), who adored planting flowers, especially roses, and her husband, Miguel (Edu Manzano), a well-respected man in their community. They used to celebrate Christmas happily with their children: Dondi (Jason Salcedo), the eldest; Vincent (Justin Simoy), a paralytic; and their only daughter, Maya (Korinne Lirio).

Trouble began when Ophelia gave birth to their youngest son, Christopher (Emman Abeleda), on Christmas Day. Soon after, Ophelia became gravely ill and a series of unfortunate events unfolded. Miguel's business suffered significant problems, forcing him into hiding. Ophelia tragically died, and the family, particularly the children, blamed Christopher for her death.

During a subsequent Christmas season, Miguel's sisters, Belle (Jaclyn Jose) and Christy (Rita Avila), along with their confidante Leopold (Manny Castañeda), arrived with a plan to sell the house. They attempted to force the Carpio children, as well as their uncle Tiyo Balti (Jaime Fabregas) and grandmother Lola Angeles (Anita Linda), to leave. Ultimately, Dondi and his siblings were moved to the garage. Tiyo Balti, however, was there to offer help, emphasizing that Christmas is the season of miracles. Dondi's girlfriend, Sandy (Anna Larrucea), also provided support.

The family’s only way to save their home was to find the land title, which was currently missing. They soon encountered a peculiar event when a Christmas ball came to life, introducing herself as a fairy named Merry (Jolina Magdangal). Merry offered each child one wish, except for Vincent, who did not believe in the spirit of Christmas. However, they were strictly barred from saying or sharing their wishes, or the wish would immediately come true.

Maya was the first to make a wish while they attended Simbang Gabi (dawn mass) at church; she wished for Vincent to walk again. Immediately, Vincent stumbled and found himself able to walk. Christopher, the next to wish, desired snow in the Philippines. Despite it being a tropical country, it began to snow, leading to a series of disasters. Christopher, in particular, suffered from pneumonia. When he spotted Belle and Christy creating a fake land title, Christy saw him, and he hid by burying himself in the snow.

Now dying, Dondi desperately wished to Merry for Christopher to be healed. Christopher was completely and mysteriously healed, a recovery the doctor could not believe. Meanwhile, Vincent mistakenly thought Dondi had wished for him to walk until he learned the truth that it was Maya. Based on the doctor’s advice that Christopher might get sick again because of the snow, Sandy then wished for the snow to stop. Belle and Christy took drastic measures to force the children out, but the children were given an extension until Christmas Day. On Christmas Eve, the family celebrated Christmas and Christopher's birthday, and Merry bid them a solemn farewell. As they celebrated, Belle and Christy arrived with a document, demanding they leave and claiming to possess the land title. But when Lola Angeles arrived, Maya presented her with a white rose. When Angeles asked where the rose came from, they led her to the garden where she began to dig. The demolition team arrived, but Dondi stopped them until Angeles unearthed a chest, triggering her memory. She recalled that Ophelia had put the land title there, and they found the real one.

In a fit of rage, Christy threw a piece of debris from the pergola, hitting Dondi in the head. The police soon arrived, and Balti told them the document Belle and Christy had was fake, pressing charges of falsification against them.

A bleeding Dondi returned to the garage, where Christopher helped him. Christopher then saw Dondi being taken by an angel, prompting him to wish once again to Merry. He wished for Dondi to return, offering his necklace, which held a locket with his parents’ pictures, as an exchange. Dondi immediately returned, assuring Christopher he had just been sleeping.

As the Carpio family prepared to attend the Christmas Eve Mass, an unexpected visitor arrived. It was Miguel, their estranged father. Dondi, Vincent, Maya, and Christopher were all finally and completely reunited with their father on Christmas Day.

== Cast and characters ==
- Jason Salcedo as Dondi Carpio
- Justin Simoy as Vincent Carpio
- Korinne Lirio as Maya Carpio
- Emman Abeleda as Christopher Carpio
- Jaclyn Jose as Belle Carpio
- Rita Avila as Christy Carpio
- Jolina Magdangal as Merry
- Edu Manzano as Miguel Carpio
- Cherry Pie Picache as Ophelia Carpio
- Anita Linda as Lola Angeles
- Jaime Fabregas as Baltazar Tiyo Balti
- Anna Larrucea as Sandy

=== Supporting cast ===
- Lara Fabregas as Binibining Kulimlim
- Ernie Zarate as the family doctor
- Giselle Toengi as Manolita Morato
- Ogie Diaz as the talk-show host
- P.J. Oreta as the newscaster
- Junell Hernando as Jon-Jon
- Anthony Rosaldo as young Dondi
- Isaiah Samuel as young Vincent

== Production ==
The majority of the visual effects of the film were handled by Roadrunner Network, Inc.

== Soundtrack ==
Puso Ng Pasko Original Soundtrack

Soundtrack album by Various artists
- Released: 1998
- Genre: OPM, Pop
- Label: Star Records

Singles from Puso Ng Pasko
- 1. "Puso Ng Pasko"

=== Track listing ===
Adapted from the Puso Ng Pasko (Original Soundtrack) liner notes.

No.	Title	Writer(s)	Producer	Length
1.	"Puso Ng Pasko" (Recorded by Jolina Magdangal)	Toto Gentica - Lore Reyes & Lou Bonnevie	Tot Gentica	4:30
2.	"Merry's Song (Wisha Wisha Wish)" (Recorded by Jolina Magdangal with Kids from the movie)	Toto Gentica - Lore Reyes	Toto Gentica	5:15
3.	"Nang Lumipad Si Vincent" (Recorded by Jolina Magdangal)	Nonong Buencamino	Marc Aramian	3:05
4.	"Kung Puwede Lang" (Recorded by Dimitri Productions' Kids Division)	Toto Gentica & Lou Bonnevie - Lou Bonnevie	Toto Gentica	4:40
5.	"Oyayi Ni Nanay" (Instrumentals by Marc Aramian)	Marc Aramian	Marc Aramian	1:15
6.	"Habangbuhay" (Recorded by Jolina Magdangal and Richard Marten)	Toto Gentica & Lou Bonnevie - Lou Bonnevie	Toto Gentica	4:20
7.	"Isno" ((Instrumentals by Marc Aramian)	Marc Aramian	Marc Aramian	4:20
8.	"Mama" (Recorded by Mezie Cajucom)	Marc Aramian / Lore Reyes	Toto Gentica	2:50
9.	"Puso Ng Pasko (Movie Version)" (Recorded by Jolina Magdangal)	Toto Gentica - Lore Reyes	Toto Gentica	4:35

=== Personnel ===
Adapted from the Puso Ng Pasko (Original Soundtrack) liner notes.

- Arranger – Toto Gentica (tracks 1,2,4,6,9)
- Guitars – Lou Bonnevie (tracks 1,6,9)
- Guitars – Arnel Sevilla (track 7)
- Back-up Vocals – Dimitri Productions' Artists-In-Residence (track 1)
- Recording engineers – Arnel Candelario (track 2)
- Recording engineers – Whannie Dellosa & German Mendoza Jr. (tracks 3,5,7,8)
- Project Assistants from Dimitri Productions – Myla Clarion and Camilo Ocenada
- Recorded and Mastered at – Dimitri, Studios, 1998 (tracks 1,2,4,6,9)
- Recorded and Mastered at – Audio Post (tracks 3,5,7,8)
- Buddy Medina – executive producer
- Rene A. Salta – A&R supervision
