= Mga Nagbabagang Bulaklak =

- Roses and Thorns
- Genre: Melodrama
- Created by: Associated Broadcasting Company; Benedict Migue
- Directed by: Jon Red
- Starring: Sheryl Cruz; Arci Muñoz; Ritz Azul; Ruffa Gutierrez; Valerie Concepcion; Carla Humphries; Christine Young; Richard Gomez; Phillip Salvador; Carmina Manzano
- Theme music composer: Willy Cruz
- Opening theme: "Init sa Magdamag" by Marvin Ong and Maffy Soler
- Country of origin: Philippines
- Original language: Filipino
- No. of episodes: 63

Production
- Executive producer: Manuel V. Pangilinan
- Running time: 30 minutes

Original release
- Network: TV5
- Release: March 21 – June 17, 2011

Mga Nagbabagang Bulaklak (transl. The Burning Flowers) is a 2011 Philippine television drama series broadcast by TV5. Directed by Jon S. Red, it stars Sheryl Cruz, Arci Muñoz, Ritz Azul, Ruffa Gutierrez, Valerie Concepcion, Carla Humphries, Christine Young, Richard Gomez, Phillip Salvador and Carmina Manzano. It aired from March 21 to June 17, 2011.

The series is a controversial show by Benedict Migue that displays events within and outside of the broadcast industry, particularly on television.

== Synopsis ==
Rosal Flores (Sheryl Cruz) is a former dancer who is apprehensive of her daughters’ involvement in show business. She knows the temptations and dangers of the industry. Her daughters Dahlia (Arci Muñoz) and Daisy (Ritz Azul) repeat Rosal's experiences as the story unfolds. Dahlia and Daisy get enmeshed in show business in their pursuit of their dream to become successful dancers/actors.

== Cast ==
=== Main cast ===
- Sheryl Cruz as Rosal Flores
- Carla Humphries as Camella / Ivy Amor / Irish
- Valerie Concepcion as Violet Alindogan
- Ruffa Gutierrez as Orchidia Ortega a.k.a. Ms. O
- Arci Muñoz as Dahlia Flores / Carnation
- Ritz Azul as Daisy Flores
- Christine Young as Lily

=== Supporting cast ===
- Richard Gomez as Apollo Ortega a.k.a. Mr. A
- Phillip Salvador as Zeus Montemayor a.k.a. Mr. Z
- Carmina Manzano as Pilar Osmundo a.k.a. Ipil Ipil
- James Blanco as Eros
- Jay Aquitania as Hector
- Victor Basa as Marco Montemayor
- Allan Paule as Artemio Flores
- Jean Saburit as Mrs. Montemayor
- Mel Martinez as Magnolia
- Rufa Mi as Makahiya
- Luningning as Frida
- Milagring as Pia
- Mariposa as Ness

=== Extended cast ===
- Jon Avila as Boris Delgado
- Rosanna Roces as Daffodil
- Gabo Clint as Ulyses
- Edward James Baviera as Dyaggo

== Soundtrack ==
- The official theme song of Mga Nagbabagang Bulaklak is "Init sa Magdamag", performed by Marvin Ong and Maffy Soler. It was originally performed by Nonoy Zuñiga. The duets were popularized by Basil Valdez and Sharon Cuneta.

== See also ==
- List of TV5 (Philippine TV network) original programming
