= Oliver Aquino =

Filipino actor, dancer and singer

- Born: 1989 (age 36–37); Marikina City, Metro Manila Philippines
- Other name: Mhyco Aquino
- Occupations: Actor; dancer; singer
- Years active: 2003–present
- Height: 175 cm (5 ft 9 in)
- Musical career
- Formerly of: Animé

Oliver Aquino (born 1989) is a Filipino actor, singer and dancer.

Aquino was a member of ABS-CBN network's circle of homegrown talents called Star Magic and was once a member of the defunct ASAP boy dance group, Animé, along with Rayver Cruz, Rodjun Cruz, John Wayne Sace, Sergio Garcia, Emman Abeleda and Mico Aytona.

In 2013, Aquino portrayed Jericho 'Jec-Jec' Manansala in 2013-14 TV series of Got to Believe

In 2014 he appeared in the film Kasal directed by Joselito Altarejos. Aquino portrayed Lorenz Gabriel in FPJ's Ang Probinsyano from 2015 to 2016.

In 2016, Aquino appeared in another Altarejos-directed film T.P.O..

== Filmography ==
=== Television ===
Year	Title	Role	Notes	Source
2003-08	ASAP	Himself—performer		
2003-05	Bida si Mister, Bida si Misis	Jun-Jun's classmate	Recurring role	
2005	Gulong ng Palad	Mark		
2005	Qpids	Himself—contestant		
2006	Game Ka Na Ba?	Himself—contestant		
2006	Maalaala Mo Kaya	Ron-ron	Episode: "Rugby"	
2007	Rounin	Lore		
2007	Maalaala Mo Kaya	Raymond	Episode: "Maong"	
2007	Ysabella	Noel		
2009	Maalaala Mo Kaya		Episode: "Soccer Ball"	
2010	Maalaala Mo Kaya	Bibot's friend	Episode: "Basura"	
2010	Maalaala Mo Kaya	Ruel	Episode: "Titulo"	
2011	Star Confessions	Joma	Episode: "Hubad: The Rosanna Roces Confession"	
2011	Maalaala Mo Kaya	Adonis	Episode: "Wig"	
2012	Maalaala Mo Kaya	Tomas	Episode: "Jacket"	
2013	Got to Believe	Jericho 'Jec-Jec' Manansala		
2014	Wattpad Presents	Angelo	Miniseries: "Poser"	
2014	Wattpad Presents	Randy	Miniseries: "Mr. Popular Meets Miss Nobody 2: Still in Love"	
2015	Single/Single	Oli		
2015-16	FPJ's Ang Probinsyano	Lorenz Gabriel		
2018	Maalaala Mo Kaya	Adel's son	Episode: "Barya"	
2020	Unlocked	Calvin	Episode: "Calvin & Drake"	

=== Film ===
Year	Title	Role	Notes	Source
2003	Kung Ako na Lang Sana	Young Edmund		
2006	Shake, Rattle and Roll 8	Martin	Segment: "LRT"	
2007	Happy Hearts	Dancer		
2009	I Love Dreamguyz	Michael		
2010	Emir	Cris		
2014	Alfredo S. Lim: The Untold Story	Romy	Uncredited	
2014	Kasal			
2016	T.P.O. (Temporary Protection Order)	Miguel		
2017	Corpus Delicti	Noel Corpuz		
2017	Tale of the Lost Boys	Alex		
2017	Double Barrel	Pancho		
2019	Gino and Mari	Gino		
2019	Circa	James		
2020	Walang Kasarian Ang Digmang Bayan			
2020	Unlocked	Calvin		
2021	Love and Pain in Between Refrains			
2022	Memories of a Love Story	Eric		
2023	The Lonely Connection	Marco		
2023	The Last Resort	Robert		
2024	Guardia de Honor			

== Awards and nominations ==
Year	Work	Organizatiom	Category	Result	Source
2004		Aliw Awards	Best Dance Group (Note: Shared with Emman Abeleda, Sergio Garcia, John Wayne Sace, Mico Aytona and Rayver Cruz, as members of Star Magic's dance group Anim-E.)	Won	
2005		Aliw Awards	Best Dance Group (Note: Shared with Emman Abeleda, Sergio Garcia, John Wayne Sace, Mico Aytona, Rodjun Cruz, Rayver Cruz and Miko Samson, as members of the expanded and renamed group Animé.)	Nominated	
2016	T.P.O.	Sinag Awards	Best Actor	Nominated	
2018	Tale of the Lost Boys	Sinag Awards	Best Actor	Nominated	
2019	Jino and Mari	Sinag Awards	Best Actor	Nominated	
2020	Jino and Mari	Gawad Urian Awards	Best Actor	Nominated	
2021	Love and Pain in Between Refrains	Filipino International Cine Festival	Best Actor (Silver) (Note: Shared with Phillip Salvador and JC Santos.)	Won	
