= Rosemarie Sonora =

Filipina actress

- Born: Rosa María Sonora y Levy; April 14, 1948 (age 78); Bacolod, Philippines
- Occupation: Actress
- Years active: 1953–1987; 1995
- Spouse: Ricky Belmonte (m. 1970; died 2001)
- Children: Sheryl Cruz; Renzo Cruz; Patrick Sonora
- Family: Susan Roces (sister)

Rosa María "Rosemarie" Sonora (born April 14, 1948) is a Filipino former actress.

== Early life ==
Sonora was born to an American mother of French and Jewish extraction and a Filipino father of mixed Spanish and Chinese Filipino descent. Her sister, Susan Roces, and her daughter, Sheryl Cruz, are also actresses.

== Career ==
She was billed as Rosemarie during her first film, Ulilang Anghel in 1958, and even during her heydays as a teen actress during the mid to late 60s. Most of her movies then were fantasy-comedy-musical flicks which were moneymakers like Juanita Banana (1968) and Rikkitik loves Rositik (1969) and a lot more. She became the princess of Sampaguita Pictures and one of the stars of Maraming Kulay ang Pag-ibig, co-starring with Loretta Marquez, Gina Pareño, Blanca Gomez, and Shirley Moreno.

During the early '70s, she had her weekly drama show, titled Rosemarie on ABS-CBN. She had to take a leave from show business when she gave birth to Wowie Cruz and also to Patrick Sonora.

== Personal life ==
She was once married to actor Ricky Belmonte, they separated. She later married an American and resides in California, long retired from acting.

== Filmography ==
=== Film ===
- Ulilang Anghel (1958)
- Dance o Rama (1963)
- Maraming Kulay ang Pag-ibig (1966)
- Ikaw ay Akin, Ako ay sa Iyo (1968)
- Juanita Banana (1968)
- Rikkitik Loves Rositik (1969)
- Gintong Alaala (1970)
- The Young at Heart (1970)
- First Kiss (1970)
- Life Everlasting (1971)
- Dearest, Forever... (1972)
- Love Eternal (1972)
- Binhi (1973)
- The Manila Connection (1974)
- Nagbabagang Silangan (1975)
- At Lumaganap ang Lagim (1975)
- Hari sa Hari, Lahi sa Lahi (1987)
- Sana Maulit Muli (1995)

=== Television ===
- Rosemarie
- Balintataw (Episode title: "Labinlimang Taon"; 1987)
