= The Penthouse Live! =

Philippine television variety show

- Title card
- Genre: Variety show
- Directed by: Fritz Ynfante
- Presented by: Martin Nievera; Pops Fernandez
- Country of origin: Philippines
- Original language: English

Production
- Executive producer: Federico M. Garcia
- Camera setup: Multiple-camera setup
- Production company: GMA Entertainment TV

Original release
- Network: GMA Radio-Television Arts
- Release: August 29, 1982 – February 15, 1987

The Penthouse Live! is a Philippine television variety show broadcast by GMA Radio-Television Arts. It premiered on August 29, 1982. The show concluded on February 15, 1987.

== Hosts ==
Hosts

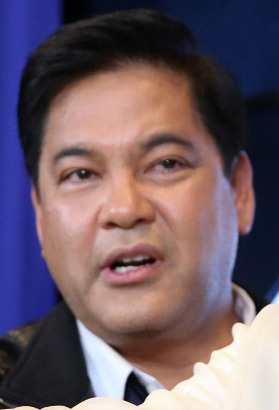
Martin Nievera

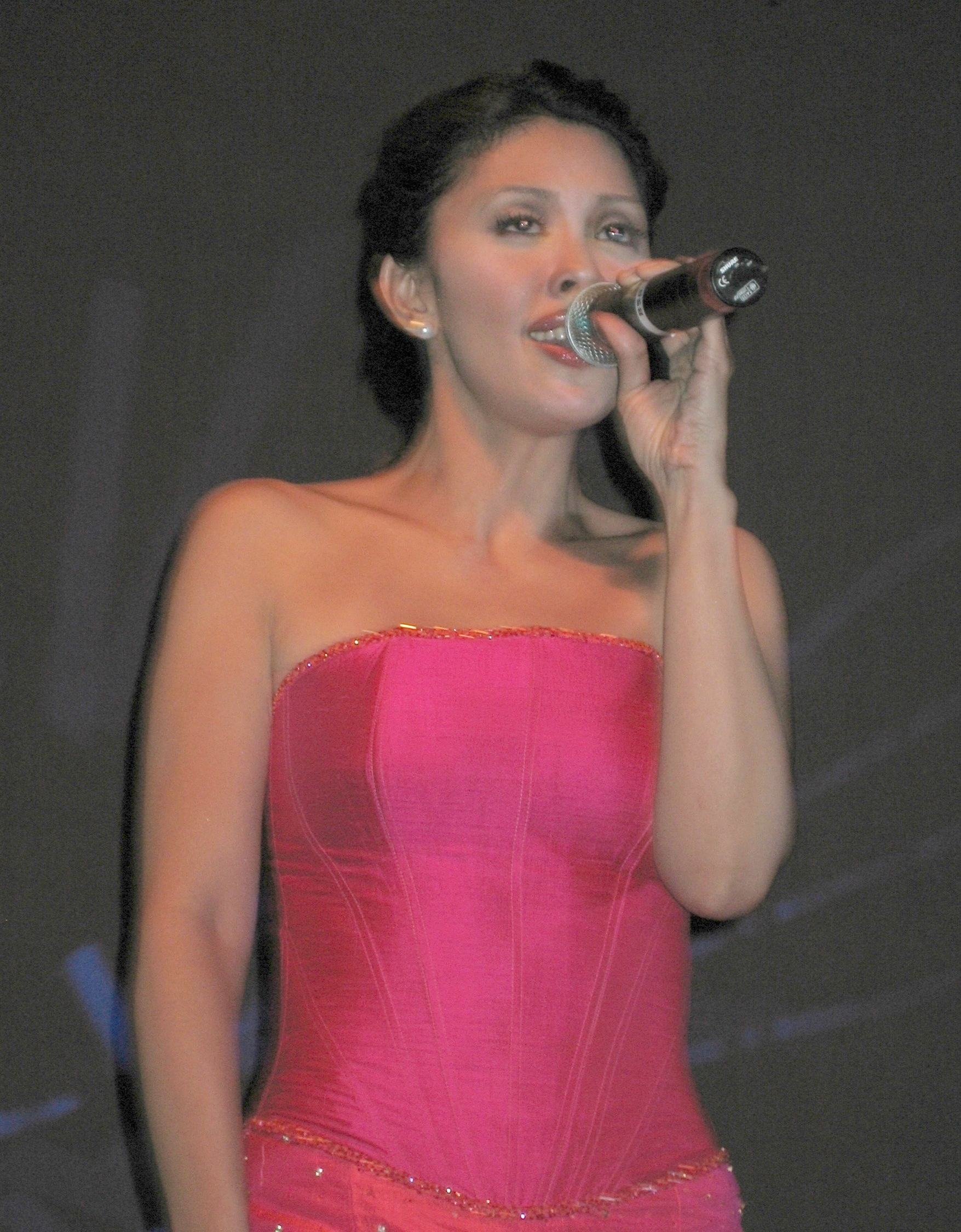
Pops Fernandez

- Martin Nievera
- Pops Fernandez

Co-host

- Nanette Inventor
