= Mico Aytona =

Filipino actor and dancer

- Born: Franco Miguel Santos Aytona; June 22, 1988 (age 38); Philippines
- Occupations: Actor; dancer; singer

Mico Aytona is a Filipino actor, singer and dancer.

== Personal life ==
Aytona is the eldest son of Felix and Leslie Aytona. He has two younger siblings Marco and Fiona.

== Filmography ==
=== Film ===
Year	Title	Role	Notes	Source
2003	Kung Ako na Lang Sana	Peter		
2005	Dubai	Young Raffy		

=== Television ===
Year	Title	Role	Notes	Source
2001	Maalaala Mo Kaya		Episode: "Bestida"	
2003–05	ASAP	Himself	Segment: "Anim-E/Anime"	
2003–05	Bida si Mister, Bida si Misis	Jun-Jun's classmate	Recurring role	
2005	Spirits	Thor		
2005	Maalaala Mo Kaya	Jerome Sala	Episode: "Hollow Blocks"	
2008–10	Ka-Blog!	Himself—host		
2011	Dwarfina	Dwentukin		
2017–18	One Asean	Himself-Co-host		
2019	Eat Bulaga: BEBOT	Beyoncé Knows Best		
2023	Black Rider	Peralta		

== Awards and nominations ==
Year	Work	Organizatiom	Category	Result	Source
2004		Aliw Awards	Best Dance Group (Note: Shared with Emman Abeleda, Sergio Garcia, Mhyco Aquino, John Wayne Sace, and Rayver Cruz, as members of Star Magic's dance group Anim-E.)	Won	
2005		Aliw Awards	Best Dance Group (Note: Shared with Emman Abeleda, Sergio Garcia, Mhyco Aquino, John Wayne Sace, Rodjun Cruz, Rayver Cruz and Miko Samson, as members of the expanded and renamed group Animé.)	Nominated	
