= Izza Ignacio =

Izza Ignacio is an actress in the Philippines.

== Career ==
In 1995, Ignacio was discovered and managed by FLT Films producer Rose Flaminiano. Her first launching movie was in Kara... Kaakit-Akit (1996). She starred in sexy movies such as Dalaga Na si Sabel (1997) with Roy Rodrigo, Hamog sa Magdamag (1998) with Renzo Cruz, and Virgin Wife (2001) with Tonton Gutierrez.

She was included in the cast of TV sitcom Kaya ni Mister, Kaya ni Misis (1997-2001) starring Maricel Soriano and Cesar Montano, aired in ABS-CBN. She also appeared in the TV series Darating ang Umaga (2003) with Eula Valdez and Vina Morales, and Kung Fu Kids (2008).

== Filmography ==
=== Film ===
- Anak, Pagsubok Lamang ng Diyos (1996) – Vicky
- Kara... Kaakit-Akit (1996) – Kara
- Santo-Santito (1996)
- Sa Iyo ang Itaas, sa Akin ang Ibaba... Ng Bahay (1997)
- Dalaga Na si Sabel (1997)
- Adarna: The Mythical Bird (1997) – Elmira
- Hamog sa Magdamag (1998)
- Star Dancer (1998)
- Madame X (2000)
- Tabi Tabi Po! (2001)
- Virgin Wife (2001)
- Walang Iwanan... Peksman! (2002) – Julie
- Walang Iba Kundi Ikaw (2002)

=== Television ===
- Kakabakaba (Episode: The Feast), (2000)
- Kaya ni Mister, Kaya ni Misis (TV sitcom) (1997-2001)
- Mary D'Potter (TV sitcom) (2001)
- Darating ang Umaga (2003)
- Pilipinas, Game Ka Na Ba? (2006)
- Maging Sino Ka Man (2006)
- Kung Fu Kids (2007)
