= John Wayne Sace =

Filipino actor

- Born: John Wayne Celeridad Sace; May 9, 1989 (age 37); Manila, Philippines
- Other names: John W. Sace; Jawe
- Occupations: Actor, dancer
- Years active: 1999–2022
- Agent: Star Magic (1999–2022)
- Height: 5 ft 6 in (168 cm)

John Wayne Sace (born May 9, 1989) is a former Filipino character actor and dancer. He first rose to prominence from being a former child actor to a teen idol.

== Biography ==
Sace was a member of ABS-CBN network's talent label, Star Magic. He started off as a child actor and later became a member of the defunct ASAP boy dance group AnimE along with Rayver Cruz, Rodjun Cruz, Mhyco Aquino, Sergio Garcia, Emman Abeleda and Mico Aytona. He had also starred in several soap operas before his acting career tapered off in the 2010s.

On October 12, 2016, Sace was injured, while his friend died, after a shooting incident in Pasig. Sace and Eric Sabino, his deceased companion, were on the Philippine National Police watchlist for supposed involvement in illegal drugs use and trafficking.

He returned to mainstream acting on FPJ's Ang Probinsyano in 2021.

On October 29, 2024, Sace was arrested at a motel on suspicion of fatally shooting a friend in Pasig the previous day. Sace had previously been imprisoned due to a domestic dispute and suffered from drug addiction.

== Filmography ==
=== Television ===
Year	Title	Role	Notes	Source
1999	Tabing Ilog	Young James		
2000	Sine'skwela	Emilio		
2003	Wansapanataym	Omeng	Episode: "Magic Paintbrush"	
2003–2015; 2021–2024	ASAP	Himself	Segment: "Anim-E/Anime"	
2003	Home Along Da Riles	Teddy Ver		
2004	Spirits	Lloyd		
2005	Maalaala Mo Kaya	EJ	Episode: "Typewriter"	
2005	Qpids	Himself		
2006	Your Song Presents: Akin Ka Na Lang	Paolo		
2006	Maalaala Mo Kaya	Erwin	Episode: "Posas"	
2006	Sa Piling Mo	Russel		
2006	Star Magic Presents: Bongga	Anton		
2006	Love Spell Presents: Home Switch Home	TJ		
2006	Maalaala Mo Kaya	Michael	Episode: "Rugby"	
2007	Maalaala Mo Kaya	Johnson	Episode: "Feeding Bottle"	
2007	Star Magic Presents: Abt Ur Luv, Ur Lyf 2	PJ Avellino		
2008	Maalaala Mo Kaya	Sherwin / Shawie	Episode: "Mesa"	
2009	May Bukas Pa	Arnel		
2009	Maalaala Mo Kaya	James	Episode: "Chess"	
2010	Habang May Buhay	Christopher		
2011	Guns and Roses	Young Abel		
2012	Lorenzo's Time	Young Vincent		
2014–2015	Forevermore	Kano		
2015	Move It: Clash of the Streetdancers	Himself — Contestant		
2021	ASAP Natin 'To	Himself	Performance with Ang Probinsyano cast from 6th anniversary	
2021–2022	FPJ's Ang Probinsyano	Omar Cuevas		

=== Film ===
Year	Title	Role	Notes	Source
2002	Dekada '70	Bingo Bartolome		
2005	Kutob	Young Lemuel		
2006	Don't Give Up on Us	Julius		
2006	Matakot Ka Sa Karma	Andres	Segment: "Aparador"	
2011	Pintakasi	DJ		
2015	Beauty and the Bestie	Waiter		

== Awards and nominations ==
Year	Work	Award	Category	Result	Source
2002	Dekada '70	Metro Manila Film Festival	Best Child Performer	Won	
