= Fritz Ynfante =

Filipino television director (1940–2025)

- Born: August 4, 1940
- Died: July 21, 2025 (aged 84)
- Occupations: Television director; actor
- Notable work: The Penthouse Live!

Fritz Ynfante (August 4, 1940 – July 21, 2025) was a Filipino television director and actor.

== Career ==
Ynfante was a television director and was known for being strict. Among the shows he directed are Bida si Mister, Bida si Misis (2002–2005), PBA TV on PTV4, and Keep On Dancing a dance competition featuring Charlene Gonzales.

Ynfante is best known for directing the 1980s variety show The Penthouse Live! which was hosted by Martin Nievera and Pops Fernandez.

He also had acting roles such as in Mananayaw (1978) of Chanda Romero, Gumising Ka Maruja (1978) of Susan Roces, and José Rizal (1998) which starred Cesar Montano and he appeared in other comedy films such as Vic Sotto's Dobol Trobol (2008) as Chef Paco and Enteng ng Ina Mo (2011) as Doc Fairy.

== Death ==
Ynfante died on July 21, 2025, due to natural causes in his residence. He was 84 years old.
