= Ganti =

Ganti may refer to:

- Ganti (2005 TV series), a 2005 Philippine television drama
- Ganti Jogi Somayaji, Telugu linguist, poet and chancellor
- Ganti Mohana Chandra Balayogi, past Speaker of Indian Lok Sabha
- Ganti Pedapudi (or Pedapudi), a village in a Gannvaram Mandal in East Godavari district, Andhra Pradesh, India
- Tibor Gánti Hungarian theoretical biologist and chemist
