= Spirits (TV series) =

Philippine television drama series

- Title card
- Genre: Fantasy; Teen drama Horror; Supernatural; Mystery
- Developed by: Malou N. Santos
- Written by: Shugo Praico
- Directed by: Chito S. Roño
- Starring: John Wayne Sace; Maja Salvador; Rayver Cruz; Jiro Manio; Serena Dalrymple; Mico Aytona; Joseph Bitangcol; Michelle Madrigal
- Ending theme: "You'll Be Safe Here" by Rivermaya
- Composer: Rico Blanco
- Country of origin: Philippines
- Original language: Tagalog
- No. of episodes: 108

Production
- Executive producer: Shiela Marie A. Ocampo
- Running time: 30 minutes
- Production company: Star Creatives

Original release
- Network: ABS-CBN
- Release: December 6, 2004 – May 6, 2005

Related
- Spirit Warriors; Spirit Warriors: The Shortcut; Spirits Reawaken

Spirits is a Philippine television drama horror fantasy supernatural mystery series broadcast by ABS-CBN. Directed by Chito S. Roño, it stars John Wayne Sace, Maja Salvador, Rayver Cruz, Jiro Manio, Serena Dalrymple, Mico Aytona, Joseph Bitangcol and Michelle Madrigal. It aired on the network's Primetime Bida line up and worldwide on TFC from December 6, 2004 to May 6, 2005, replacing It Might Be You and was replaced by Mga Anghel na Walang Langit.

The series about eight children: Red, Lloyd, Maya, Liz, Jessie, Thor, Nato, and Gabby, who find out one day that they have special abilities unlike normal humans, which they received when a strange epidemic hit their hometown.

Intended to be a prequel to director Chito S. Roño's Spirit Warriors films, Spirits was Roño's television debut, though he had already directed several films.

== Premise ==
One day in 1993, a small town is hit by an unknown supernatural epidemic, which only affected children. About a week after the sickness hit, almost every toddler and child in town was affected, and the town hospital was full of children. The same night, the evening sky started to change colors, into a mix of pink, red, and purple. A few hours after the sky changed, a pregnant lady was taken to the hospital, unaware that the baby that she was carrying was an alien. An unknown man knew about the alien, and went to the hospital to kill it, which would mean also killing the mother. The man entered the emergency room, but too late. The alien was born and just as he entered the room, the alien released a bright light in the hospital which killed almost all the children there. The only ones who survived were eight children and the adults.

== Cast and characters ==
According to the plot, the world was composed by three different groups: Mortal, Immortals, and Elementals.

=== Mortals ===
Mortals are the group of simple people. Some have powers.

List of Mortals in the Story:

- Red (Portrayed by Rayver Cruz) – the group's de facto leader, and the first of the teens to consider banding together to figure out why there are many "gifted" kids in town. He and six of his friends, who are the most powerful of the "gifted" kids, form the Camera Club. He possesses the power of telekinesis and eventually, later in the series, gained the ability to levitate.
- Lloyd (Portrayed by John Wayne Sace) – Who can see and communicate with the dead as clearly as the living. In the latter part of the series, as part of the characters' power "upgrades", he is able to project a corporeal double of himself, and later of others.
- Gabby (Portrayed by Maja Salvador) – The school's classic overachiever whose sunny ways ensure she is liked by everyone she meets. She is the object of Red's and Lloyd's affections and spends much of the series torn between them. She does not possess any powers.
- Nato (Portrayed by Jiro Manio) – The descendant of a long line of healers who now struggles with his gift of speaking with enchanted creatures, usually duwendes (dwarves). He gains the power of the third eye which enables him to see through illusions. He also gains the power of a gatekeeper and is able to jump between different realms.
- Liz (Portrayed by Serena Dalrymple) – A mind-reader who eventually realizes that the "curse" for reading other people's thoughts is really a gift. Her power eventually grows, enabling her to control minds.
- Thor (Portrayed by Mico Aytona) – The easy-go-lucky class clown who joins the Camera Club for his own not-quite-honest reasons. Though lacking any power, he has helped his friends through many of their adventures and is also ready to help when needed.
- Maya (Portrayed by Michelle Madrigal) – Maya is an empath, a psychic who can sense, understand and absorb another person's emotions and can see the past of anything or anyone through her touch even if that other person is not in the same room (a form of clairvoyance). Maya's powers later improve and she is able to project feelings through her hands, which she has used to inadvertently cause boils to appear on someone's skin.
- Jessie (Portrayed by Joseph Bitangcol) – A more dangerous power lies within resident rebel Jessie, who is Lloyd's cousin, who finds out he can start fires with just his mind. As part of the characters' power "upgrade," he is able to control and manipulate fire
- Kuya Dong (Portrayed by Jhong Hilario) – The school's resident maintenance man and Nato's uncle. He is the only one who knows about Brita and her true plan. He hopes to stop her on his own in order to protect the kids and prevent Brita's rise to power.

=== Immortals ===
Immortal are creatures that cannot die.

- Taga-sundo (Death) (Portrayed by Ku Aquino) – The most hated being in the Engkanto's world. He is the series' first villain after he abducted Gabby while in their homeworld. But towards the end of the series, he became an ally because he was forced by Prinsipe Dumala in order to end the chaos that is happening.
- Pighati (Pain) (Portrayed by Glenda Garcia) – Taga-sundo's Sister. If Pain and Death touched each other, One of them is going to die.
- Hinagpis (Sorrow) (Portrayed by Gigette Reyes) - Taga-sundo's sister
- Taga-Bantay (The Protector) (Portrayed by Lito Pimentel) – The one who protects the three enchanted stones that completes the reborn of the darkness.
- Taga-tala (The Prophet) (Portrayed by Lou Veloso) – An old hermit-like adviser to Prinsipe Dumala that writes every certain event of the history. He holds the key to finding out how to defeat the First Evil.

=== Elementals ===
Elementals are those who are supernatural and enchanted creatures.

- Prinsipe Dumala (Portrayed by Danilo Barrios) – The prince of Engkantos, He disguised as a human because he likes Gabby and even invited her to his kingdom; Dumala's intentions with her are honorable and intended to return Gabby to the human world in due time; however, her friends thinking otherwise led to Red and Lloyd following her to the world of the Engkantos. But later, the prince became an ally throughout the last episode and helped the kids in order to stop the greatest threat that is to yet to come.
- Bakshi – An elf friend of Nato and Dong and Mang Jose, Dong and Nato's Father told him to look after them.
- Sola (Portrayed by Kristine Jaca) – A disguiser. She disguised as Gabby while Gabby was still with the Taga-sundo, so that the people will not worry about Gabby.

Mga Taong Araw – Red and Lloyd meet them when they were travelling to save Gabby in the World of Elementals. Taong Araws works and give fun to Prinsipe Dumala.

- Bughaw (Portrayed by Janus del Prado) – A taong araw who is the eldest of the siblings, who dislikes Red and Lloyd when they entered their troupe.
- Luntian (Portrayed by Ronaliza Cheng) – A taong araw who is the youngest of the siblings, she helped Red and Lloyd when they were still in the troupe.
- Kahel (Portrayed by Mike Agassi) - A taong araw who is the middle of the siblings, in the first place he hates Red and Lloyd while in their troupe, but later on appreciates them because of an injury that Red and Lloyd saved Luntian in the spear attack in the field.

Mga Diwata (Fairies) – They helped Red, Lloyd and Jessie to go to the World of Elementals.

- Diwatang Tubig (Portrayed by Cherry Lou) -–Fairy of water.
- Diwatang Apoy (Portrayed by Jenny Miller) – Fairy of fire.
- Diwatang Hangin (Portrayed by Assunta de Rossi) – Fairy of air.
- Diwatang Lupa - Fairy of Earth

Mga Mangkukulam (Witches)

- Brita/Lupe (Portrayed by Lotlot de Leon) – Lloyd's mother and Jessie's aunt and the series' antagonist. She is dead as the series starts, but still regularly talks to Lloyd. He hopes to use Lloyd to do her bidding. Though motherly at first, her true goal is to finish what she started: to collect the "gifted" kids in town and sacrifice them in order to gain more power and to live.
- Milagros, The Leader of the Mangkukulams (Portrayed by Bella Flores) – Brita's sister and leader of the group of mangkukulams.

=== Other characters ===
- Ricky Davao – Red's dad
- Sandy Andolong as Paz – Red's mom
- Marjorie Barretto as Marita – Gabby's mom
- Cris Villanueva – Liz's dad
- Ilonah Jean – Maya's mom
- Allyson Lualhati – Sofronia, Lloyd's ghost friend
- Miles Ocampo – Grace, Gabby's sister
- Efren Reyes Jr. – Police Chief Jaime, Jessie's step-dad
- Nica Peralejo
- Helga Krapf
- Diego Castro – Harvey
- Blair Arellano
- Glaiza de Castro – Pinky
- Minnie Aguilar
- Dexter Doria as Miss V. – school principal
- Nash Aguas – Young Red
- Miguel Vera
- My-My Davao
- Liza Lorena as Azon - Red's Lola
- Ching Arellano
- Sergio Garcia

== Broadcast ==
The show re-aired on Studio 23 (now S+A) in 2005 and on the Kapamilya Channel (now S+A International) in 2007. On August 13, 2021, the official Youtube channel of Jeepney TV started uploading full episodes of the series.

== Reception ==
The drama received mixed reviews from TV viewers and critics. Its highest rating was 37.4%, the lowest was 20.5% and an average of 24.9% in the Mega Manila ratings as the Nationwide ratings were still occasional and not yet available daily.

== Remake ==
A remake directed by Topel Lee and produced by GMO Entertainment Unit titled Spirits: Reawaken was announced for ABS-CBN's iWant streaming service. It will be set in the 90s and follows six teenagers with supernatural powers as they protect Earth from an alien invasion.

Spirits: Reawaken stars Grae Fernandez as Red, Jairus Aquino as Jesse, Bugoy Cariño as Nato, Kira Balinger as Maya, Chanty as Gabbie and Patrick Quiroz as Lloyd. The series began streaming on November 17, 2018.
