= Ang TV =

Philippine television comedy variety show

- Title card
- Genre: Comedy; Variety show
- Created by: Laurenti Dyogi; Boyong Baytion; Johnny Manahan
- Directed by: Johnny Manahan
- Opening theme: "Do Wah Diddy Diddy" by Manfred Mann (1992–1994)
- Country of origin: Philippines
- Original language: Filipino
- No. of episodes: 1,170

Production
- Running time: 30–45 minutes

Original release
- Network: ABS-CBN
- Release: October 19, 1992 – March 7, 1997

Ang TV (English: the TV) is a Philippine television sketch comedy variety show broadcast by ABS-CBN. Directed by Johnny Manahan, it premiered on October 19, 1992. The show concluded on March 7, 1997, with a total of 1,170 episodes.

== Overview ==
Ang TV featured comedic gags, jokes, and skits, alongside performances in singing and dancing and segments involving hosting. The program popularized the opening line "4:30 na! Ang TV na!" and the catchphrase "Nge!", which became associated with the show.

== Cast ==
Cast

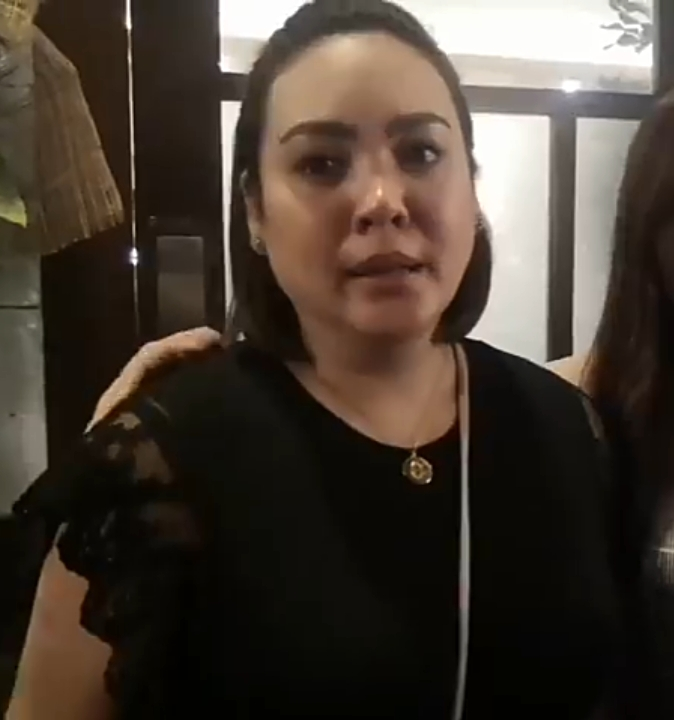
Claudine Barretto

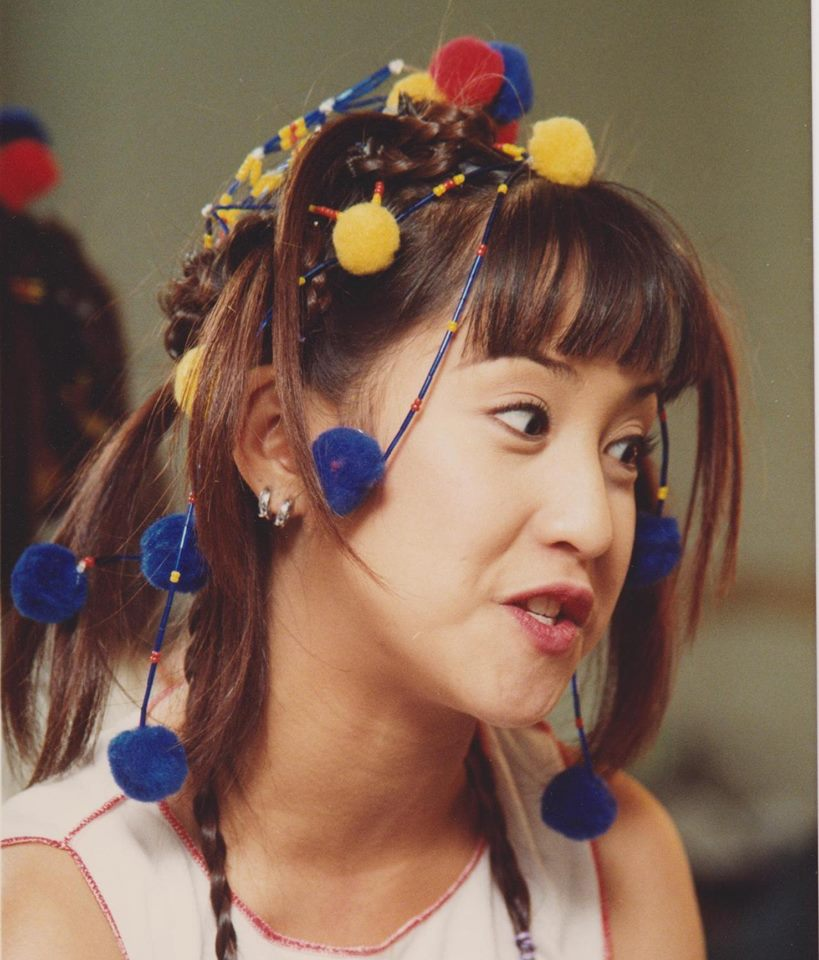
Jolina Magdangal

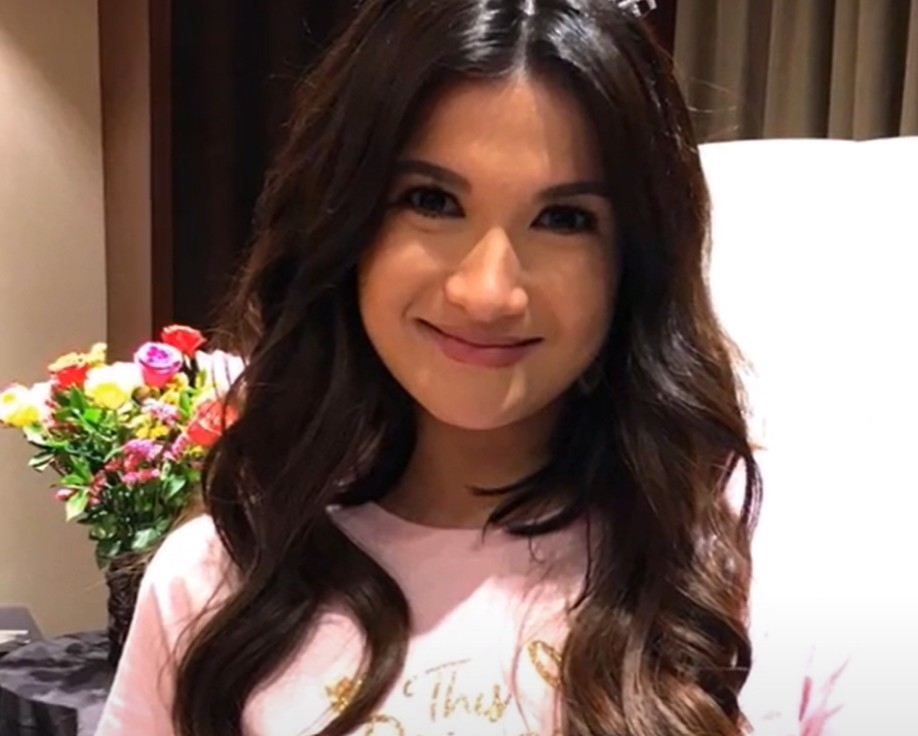
Camille Prats

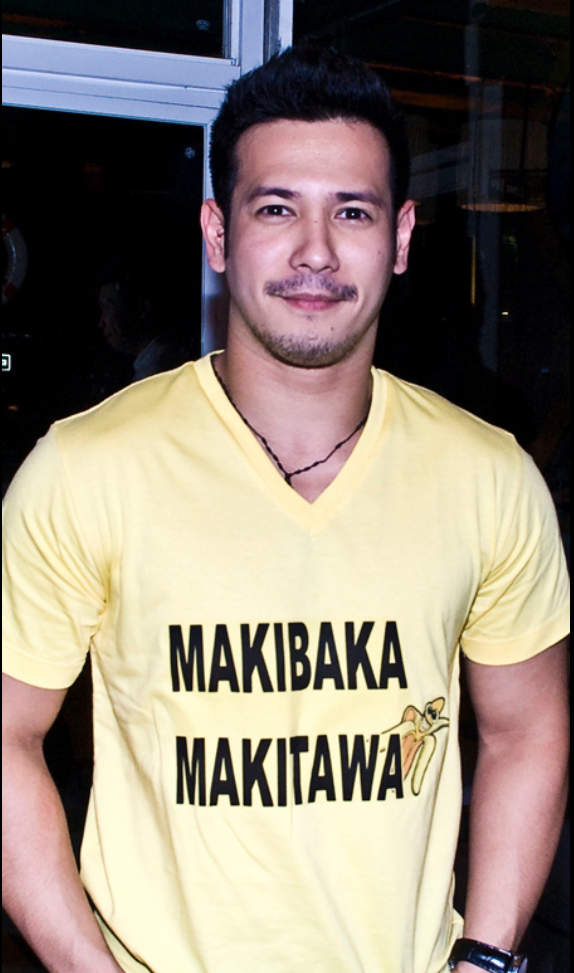
John Prats

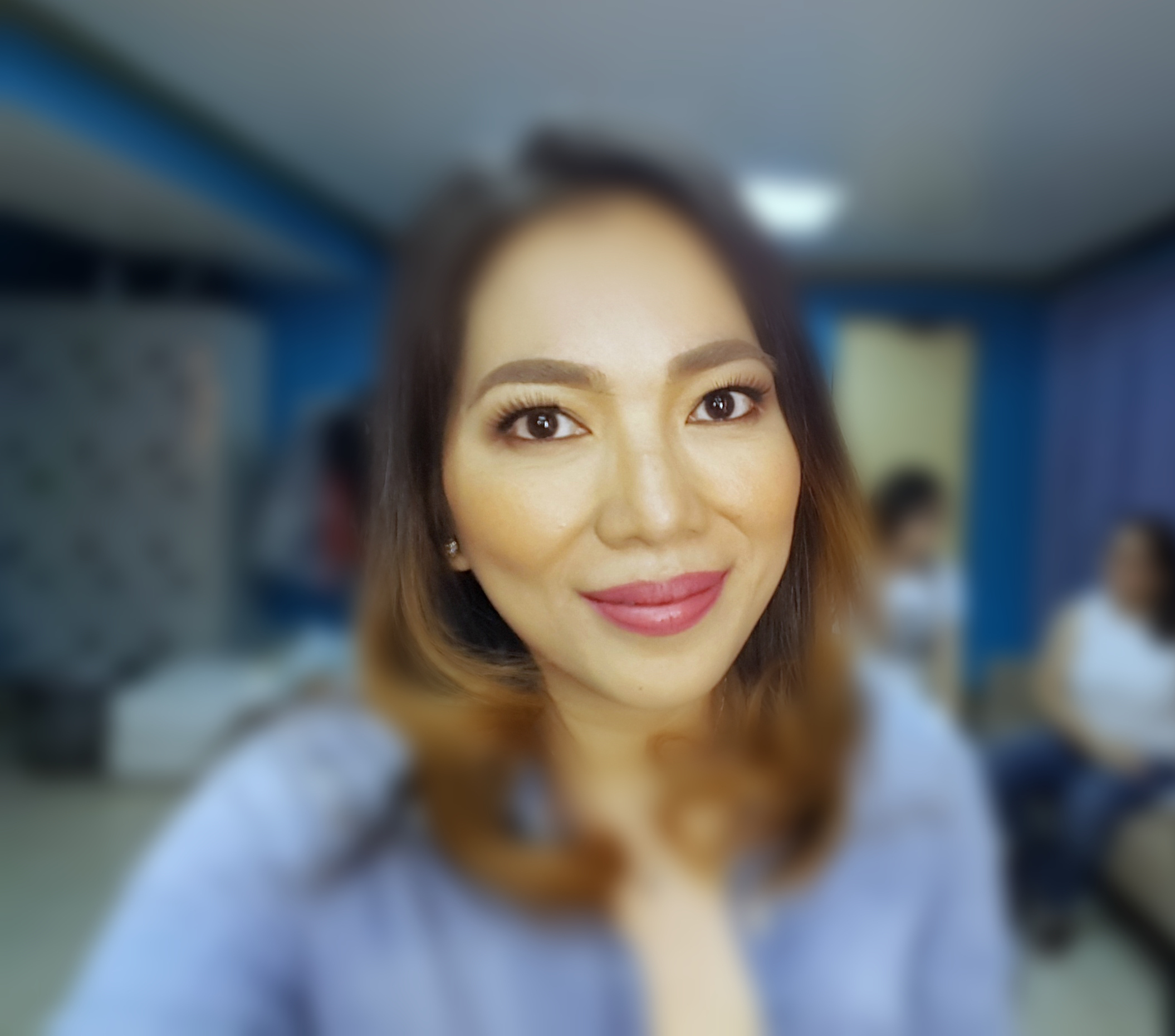
Jan Marini

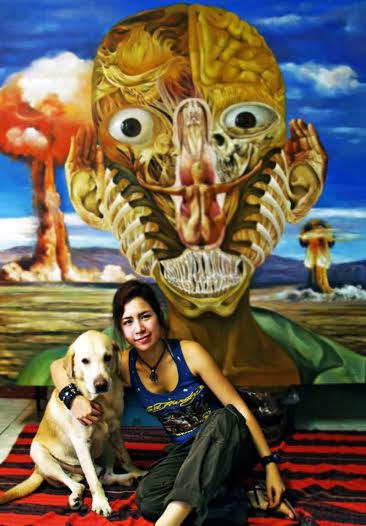
Camille Dela Rosa

Cast

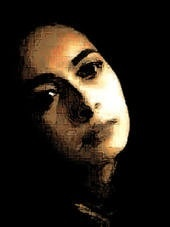
Nikka Valencia

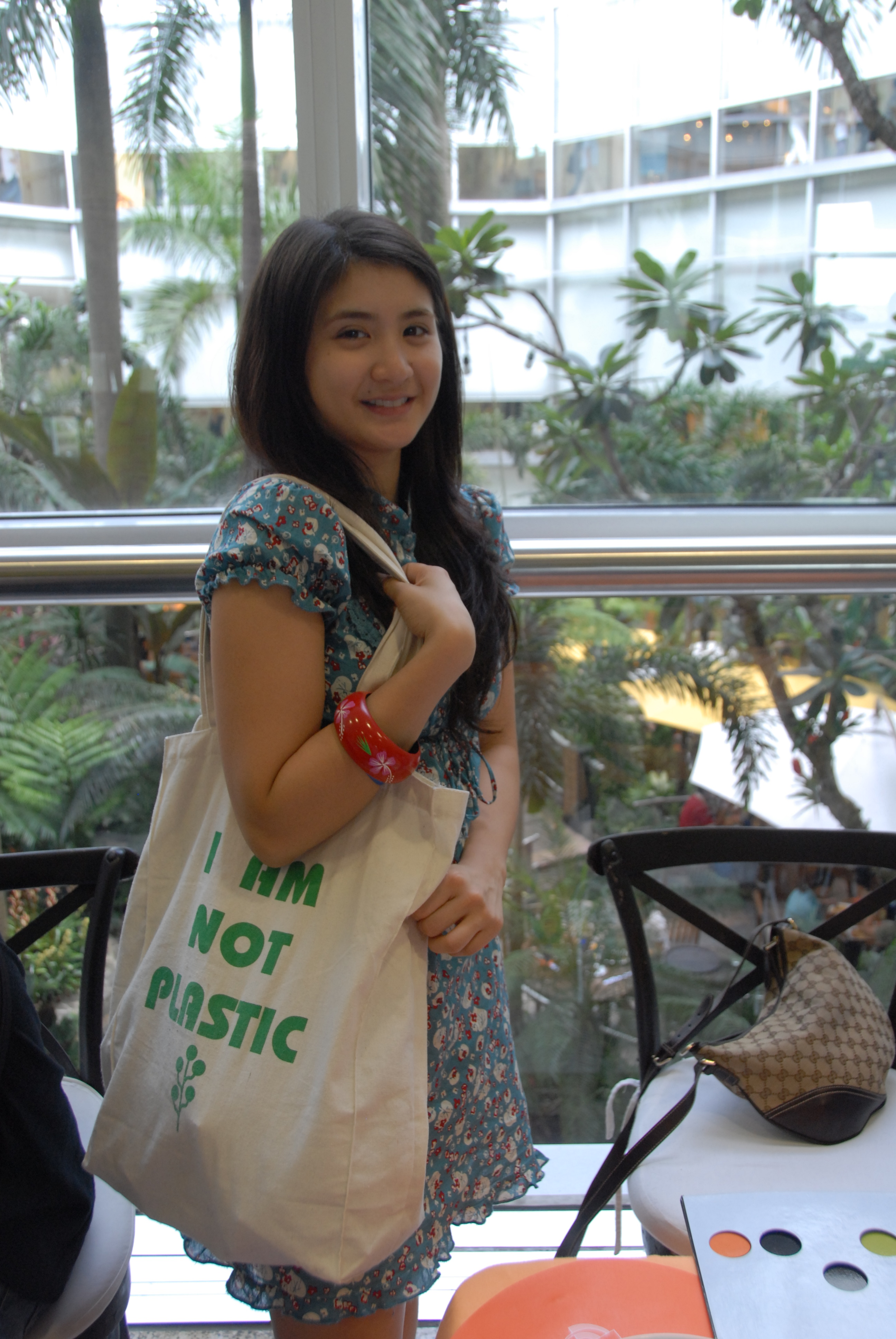
Rica Peralejo

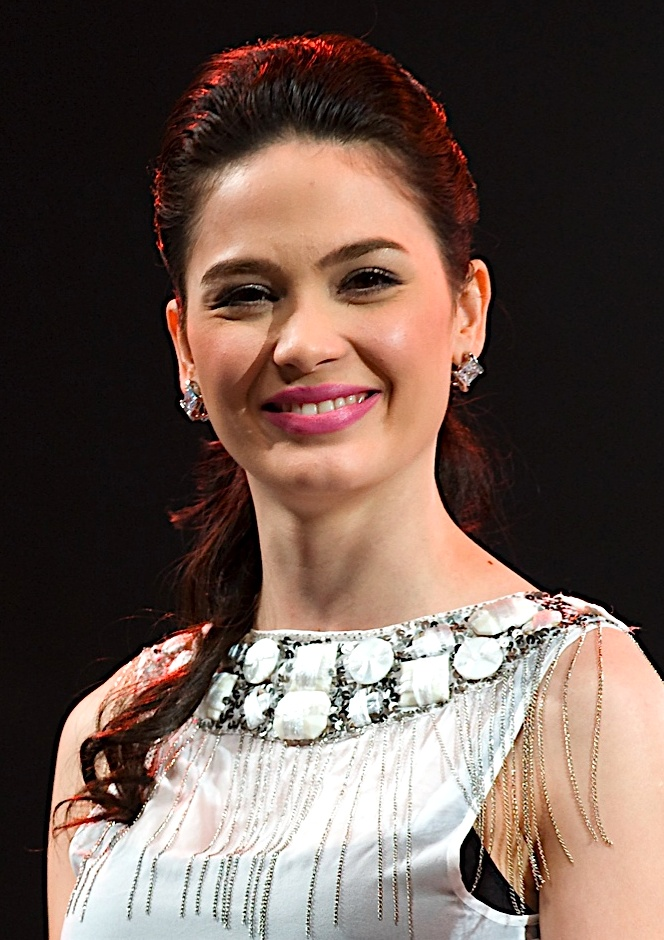
Kristine Hermosa

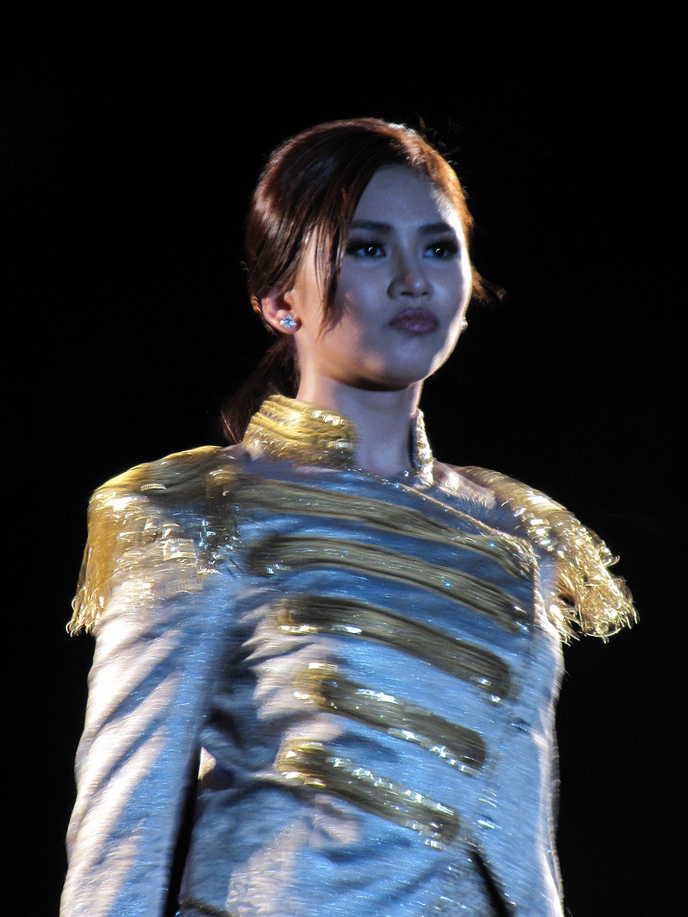
Sarah Geronimo

=== First season (1992–1994) ===
- Christy Canay
- Gio Alvarez
- Ivy Ramintas
- Guila Alvarez
- James Batusin
- Claudine Barretto
- Paolo Contis
- Mon Castro
- TJ Cruz
- Lindsay Custodio
- Maybelyn dela Cruz
- Maria Chona Princesa de Guzman
- Camille Dela Rosa
- Angelu de Leon
- Maria Kathrina Jhechelle Dizon
- Ericka Fife
- Cheska Garcia
- Edgardo Francisco
- Dhaniel Garcia
- Migi Guidotti
- Patrick Garcia
- Rodel Canlas
- Alfred Manal
- Jolina Magdangal
- Alfonso Martinez
- Alyanna Martinez
- Susan Hosseinzadeh
- Ryan Arnold Ragodos
- Jan Marini
- Jet Chua
- Roselle Nava
- Camille Prats
- Lailani Navarro
- John Prats
- Victor Neri
- Vandolph Quizon
- Christopher Roxas
- Janniel Kent Sandag
- Sarji Ruiz
- Katya Santos
- Daniel Villota
- Junlyle Omisol
- Paulie Yllana
- Jael Manalili
- Jane Zaleta
- Anna Vanessa Garcia
- Marnie Arcilla
- Baron Geisler
- Boy 2 Quizon
- Raymund Lacsamana
- Michelle Suzara
- Igi Boy Muhlach
- Camille Mortiz

=== Second season (1994–1995) ===
- Marco Ballesteros
- Gio Alvarez
- Darwin Berones
- Guila Alvarez
- Nicole Borja
- Luigi Alvarez
- Paolo Contis
- Marnie Arcilla
- Rebecca Costales
- Claudine Barretto
- Bodie Cruz
- Mon Castro
- TJ Cruz
- Lindsay Custodio
- Maybelyn dela Cruz
- Jessy Dominguez
- Camille Dela Rosa
- Ericka Fife
- AJ Eigenmann
- Farrah Florer
- Geoff Eigenmann
- Susan Hosseinzadeh
- Cheska Garcia
- Tony Lambino
- Patrick Garcia
- Joymee Lim
- Anna Larrucea
- Jolina Magdangal
- Allyzon Lualhati
- Jay Manalo
- Maxene Magalona
- Jan Marini
- Alfred Manal
- Roselle Nava
- Paula Peralejo
- Lailani Navarro
- Kristopher Peralta
- Victor Neri
- Iza Virata
- Ryan Ostrea
- Camille Prats
- Rica Peralejo
- John Prats
- Carlos Ramirez I
- Boy 2 Quizon
- Carlos Ramirez II
- Katya Santos
- Erickson Reyes
- Mark Santos
- Christopher Roxas
- Princess Schuck
- Sarji Ruiz
- Rodney Shattara
- Jason San Pedro
- Michelle Suzara
- Nikka Valencia
- Antoinette Taus || Paulie Yllana
- Tom Taus
- Christine Young
- Lenin Tomines
- Jane Zaleta
- Renzon "Jay" Viray
- Mark Vernal
- Jao Mapa

=== Third season (1995–1996) ===
- Kaye Abad
- Junifer Albances
- Dean Russel de Jesus
- Gio Alvarez
- Bianca Aguila
- Guila Alvarez
- Katrina Aguila
- Luigi Alvarez
- Nicole Borja
- Charlyn Bensurto
- Carol Banawa
- Lindsay Custodio
- Paolo Contis
- Jessy Dominguez
- Bodie Cruz
- Ericka Fife
- TJ Cruz
- Farrah Florer
- Chubi del Rosario
- Cheska Garcia
- Camille Dela Rosa
- Kathleen Hermosa
- Patrick Garcia
- Jolina Magdangal
- Sergio Garcia
- Jan Marini
- Baron Geisler
- Roselle Nava
- Sarah Geronimo
- Victor Neri
- Kristine Hermosa
- Rica Peralejo
- Giancarlo Hilario
- Gerald Pizzaras
- Michael Roy Jornales
- Jason San Pedro
- Anna Larrucea
- Nikki Valdez
- Maxene Magalona
- Christine Young
- Alfred Manal
- Mark Vernal
- Hazel Ann Mendoza
- Stefano Mori
- Nicole Anderson
- Camille Mortiz
- Kien Navarro
- Iwi Nicolas
- Angelica Panganiban
- Nica Peralejo
- Paula Peralejo
- Sara Polverini
- Camille Prats
- John Prats
- CJ Ramos
- Thou Reyes
- Katya Santos
- Princess Schuck
- Alvin Froy Alemania
- Hanhan Locsin
- Marc Solis
- Antoinette Taus
- Karina Mae Cruz
- Tom Taus
- Kevin Vernal

=== Fourth and final season (1996–1997) ===
- Emman Abeleda
- Kaye Abad
- Alvin Froy Alemania
- Carol Banawa
- Nicole Anderson
- Farrah Florer
- Gian Bernabe
- Cheska Garcia
- Ronalisa Cheng
- Patrick Garcia
- Lorena Garcia
- Gino Guzman
- Sergio Garcia
- Kathleen Hermosa
- Victoria Haynes
- Kristine Hermosa
- Michael Roy Jornales
- Jacqui Manzano
- Anna Larrucea
- Doods Peralejo
- Jefferson Long
- Daniel King Reyes
- Celine Lirio
- Nikki Valdez
- Korinne Lirio
- Mark Vernal
- Allyson Lualhati
- Shaina Magdayao
- Alfred Manal
- Hazel Ann Mendoza
- Stefano Mori
- Iwi Nicholas
- Angelica Panganiban
- Paula Peralejo
- Nica Peralejo
- Sara Polverini
- Camille Prats
- John Prats
- CJ Ramos
- Patricia Anne Roque
- Karina Mae Cruz
- Princess Schuck
- Rodney Shattara
- Agatha Tapan
- Alwyn Uytingco

Special participation

- Winnie Cordero
- Joji Isla
- Boyong Baytion
- Giselle Sanchez
- Joy Viado
- Ian Oliver Nocum Tolentino
- Jobelle Camposano
- Paquito Diaz
- Romy Diaz
- Ruel Vernal
- Amy Perez
- Berting Labra

== Ang TV 2 ==
Following the success of Ang TV, it returned in 2001 as Ang TV 2 with a new generation of young performers. However, its second incarnation was suddenly cancelled on January 11, 2002.

=== Cast ===
- Dean Russell de Jesus
- Nicole Anderson
- Blair Arellano
- Alyssa Asistio
- Arjo Atayde
- Tara Ballesca
- Mico Aytona
- Daniella Barretto
- Bernard Cardona
- Ronalisa Cheng
- JM de Guzman
- Nathalie de Leon
- Sergio Garcia
- Louise delos Reyes
- Bryan Homecillo
- Rachelle Garrucho
- Yuuki Kadooka
- Angel Gonzales
- Khalil Kaimo
- Moreen Guese
- Alfred Labatos
- Nicki Judalena
- Gabriel de Leon
- Denise Laurel
- Miguel de Leon
- Shaina Magdayao
- Rex Agoncillo
- Andi Manzano
- Luigi Muhlach
- Zia Marquez
- John Wayne Sace
- Paula Xavier Cabantog
- Timmy Boy Sta. Maria
- Nica Peralejo
- Alwyn Uytingco
- Djohanna Rio
- Aljon Valdenibro
- Empress Schuck
- Cyrus Valdez
- Princess Schuck
- Job Zamora
- Antonette Yu
- Daniel Reyes
- Michaela Gonzales
- Igi Boy Flores
- Victor Villanueva II
- Tryztoff Mariano
- Nino Lucas
- Julius Camacho
- Christian Rey Fernandez

== Ang TV Movie: The Adarna Adventure ==
On October 9, 1996, Star Cinema released a movie Ang TV Movie: The Adarna Adventure, and was directed by Johnny Manahan.
