= Ken Alfonso =

Filipino actor

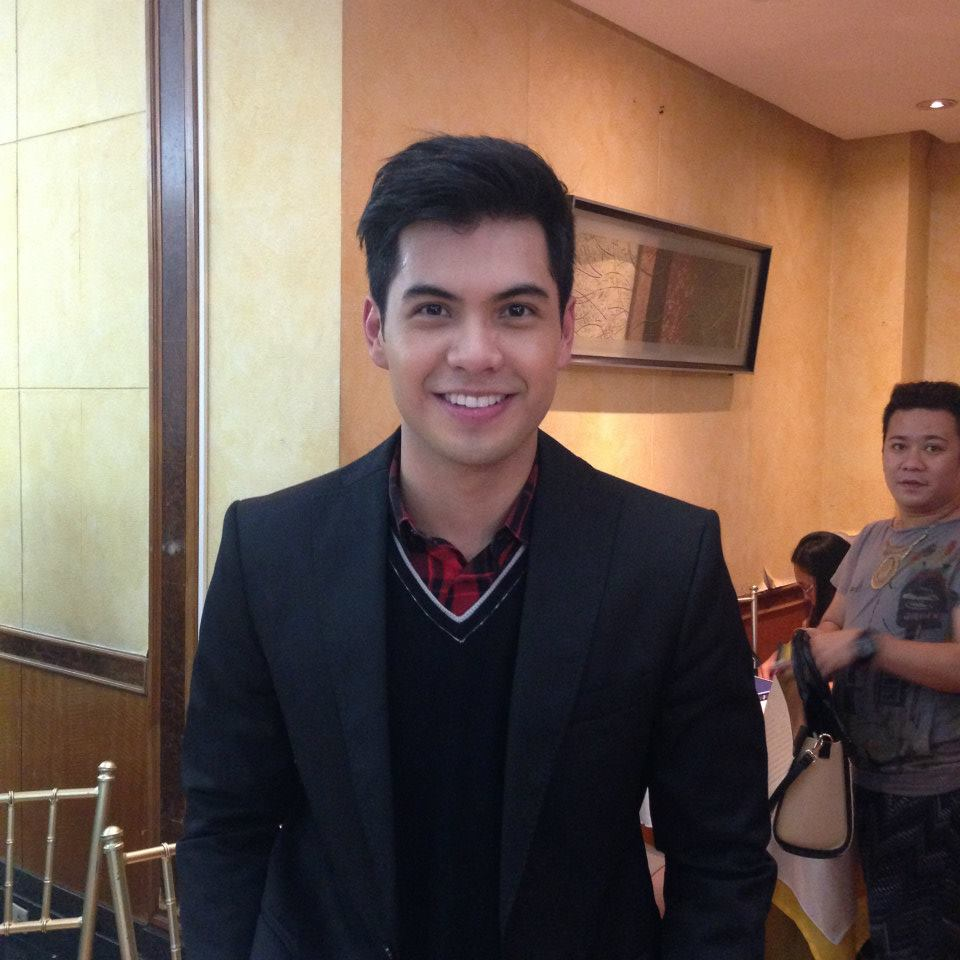
- Born: Kennedy Dela Cruz Alfonso; February 20, 1990 (age 36); Antipolo, Rizal, Philippines
- Occupations: Actor, dancer, model, singer
- Years active: 2010–2018

Kennedy Dela Cruz Alfonso (born February 20, 1990), known professionally as Ken Alfonso is a Filipino singer and television actor, who played the role of Gamil in GMA Network's requel of Encantadia.

== Biography ==
Alfonso became famous for his role of Thomas in the teledrama Kailan Ba Tama ang Mali? the cast of Geoff Eigenmann, Max Collins, Empress Schuck, Dion Ignacio and Ervic Vijandre. He became notable and popular for his short but long-lived role in Encantadia's requel as the Lirean soldier — Sang'gre Mira's father whom netizens chants that he is the one wasted by Hara Pirena. He appeared with Janice Hung, Solenn Heussaff, Julianne Lee, Kate Valdez, Zoren Legaspi, and Glaiza de Castro among other cast.

== Filmography ==
=== Television ===
Year	Title	Role	Note
2014	Magpakailanman: Krimen sa Ngalan ng Puri	Billy	Episode Guest
2015	Kailan Ba Tama ang Mali?	Thomas Alejandro	Supporting cast
2015	Maynila: My Bodyguard		Episode Guest
2015	Pari 'Koy	Ram	Guest cast
2015	The Rich Man's Daughter	Lester	Guest cast
2015	Magpakailanman: Misis Vs Beki	Patrick	Episode Guest
2015	Destiny Rose	Aris	Supporting cast
2015	Magpakailanman: Paskong Malamig ang Puso	Leo	Episode guest
2016	Karelasyon	Dennis	Episode guest
2016; 2017	Encantadia	Gamil	Guest cast
2016	Dear Uge: Ms. Fortune Teller	Prince	Episode Guest
2016	Magpakailanman: Davao Bombing: Mga kuwento ng pag-asa - Part 1 / Part 2	Ericson	Episode Guest
2017	My Love from the Star	Lester Hernandez	Supporting cast

== Discography ==
"Umaasa" Released in 2014 Under GMA Records. ("Theme From Koreanovela, Secret Love")
