= Roselle Nava =

Filipino actress and politician (born 1976)

Member of the Parañaque City Council from the 1st district
- In office June 30, 2010 – June 30, 2019

Personal details
- Born: Roselle Paulino Nava; March 28, 1976 (age 50) Parañaque, Philippines
- Party: Liberal (2009–2012; 2015–2018)
- Other political affiliations: UNA (2012–2015)
- Spouse: Allen Ford Tan (m. 2010)
- Children: 2
- Education: De La Salle University; Colegio de San Agustin - Makati (High School)

Roselle Paulino Nava-Tan (born March 28, 1976) is a Filipino singer, film and television actress, and former politician. She is a multi-platinum female singer in the Philippines and one of the most in-demand divas during the '90s era. She is tagged as the "Philippines' Sentimental Diva" and the "former supreme songbird of ABS-CBN". She was formerly dubbed as the "90s Philippine Pop Queen". She started her career as a part of ABS-CBN's defunct youth-oriented show Ang TV (1992–1997) together with Jolina Magdangal, Claudine Barretto, Antoinette Taus, etc. She was also a regular host and performer of ASAP, the Philippines longest variety show, from 1995 to 2004 and since 2015.

She is the singer behind the hits like "Bakit Nga Ba Mahal Kita", "Maniniwala Ba Ako", "Dahil Mahal Na Mahal Kita", "Laging Ikaw Parin", "Ikaw Pala", "Mahal Mo Ba'y Di Na Ako" and "Huwag Ka Nang Babalik".

== Showbiz career ==
From 1994 to 1995, she was hailed as the Best Female Singer of the Year for the song You by Awit Awards. In 1994, her very first signature hit, "Bakit Nga Ba Mahal Kita", became the number one charted song in the Philippines and stayed in the radio charts for 8 months from 1994 to 1995. It became the theme song of many Filipinos who went through heart breaks and got lost in love.

In 1997, however her commercialized success of Dahil Mahal Na Mahal Kita, her carrier single from her 3rd album (Roselle: On Higher Ground), emerged immediate success and even spanned a film with the same name and even in album registry.

To date, Dahil Mahal Na Mahal Kita was also covered four times by different artists: Rachelle Ann Go for The Gulong Ng Palad (2006) Soundtrack and Zsa Zsa Padilla's rendition for the Afternoon Soap theme Magkano Ang Iyong Dangal? in 2010, in 2013 by Vice Ganda for the soundtrack of the Primetime series Huwag Ka Lang Mawawala, and in 2018, Jonalyn Viray (aka Jona), for the teleserye Asintado.

In 2000, she revived the Barry Manilow song "Somewhere Down The Road" for the Blockbuster Film "Minsan Minahal Kita" which also was included in the Original Motion Picture Soundtrack; and in 2002, her comeback platinum hit with Star Records "Huwag Ka Nang Magbabalik for the film Ngayong Nandito Ka and Jologs.

In 2002, Nava was chosen as the interpreter for the song, Free, composed by Gino Torres. The demo version was recorded by Carol Banawa. But the composer chose Roselle to do the final and live version. It became as one of the finalists of ABS-CBN's JAM: Himig Handog sa Makabagong Kabataan. It also became the theme song of ABS-CBN's summer station ID in the same year.

Her last album with Star Records (ABS-CBN's recording outfit) All About Love achieved the Platinum Status but was never awarded to her. She moved to Viva Entertainment Agency and signed up for several projects. VIVA did not commercialise her artistry as her recent albums got no awards. The poor sales performance of her albums affected her singing career.

In 2010, Bakit Nga Ba Mahal Kita was also re-recorded by Laarni Lozada for the Afternoon Drama "Alyna"; and Kakai Bautista, Philippines' Dental Diva, as her carrier single for her debut album under Star Music in 2017.

=== Vocal profile ===
Roselle's voice can be classified as soprano as her style is very similar with Regine Velasquez's singing prowess. She suffered from a throat virus which affected the brilliance of her voice. She was able to cope through healing sessions and support from her fans.

=== Recent trends ===
In 2009, she was part of the talked-about successful concert entitled "Divas of the 90s", produced by VIVA Entertainment Company. Her co-performers were Geneva Cruz, Jessa Zaragoza, and Rachel Alejandro.

On February 13, 2016, she also had a successful concert with other OPM icons entitled LOVE THROWBACK held in PICC (Philippine International Convention Center).

On February 4, 2018, Nava was given a tribute by ASAP as one of the OPM gems in the country. She sang her signature hits with ABS-CBN's homegrown talents. The tribute showed how she started as a prime diva of ABS-CBN and what's her life now. Roselle was awarded a plaque of recognition with her contribution to OPM.

== Filmography ==
=== Film ===
Year	Title	Role	Ref.
1995	Hataw Na	Liezl Hernandez	
1995	Mangarap Ka	Trishia	
2002	I Think I'm In Love	Marya	
2011	Babang Luksa	Cathy	

=== Television ===
Year	Title	Role	Ref.
1992–1993	Ang TV		
1995–2003; 2010; 2015–present	ASAP		
1996	Oki Doki Doc	Honey	
1997	Bayani	Atang de la Rama	
2000–2001	Tabing Ilog	Kelly	
2002	Sa Dulo ng Walang Hanggan	Herself/Cameo role	
2003–2004	Masayang Tanghali Bayan		
2012	Sarah G. Live		
2014	The Singing Bee		
2018	I Can See Your Voice		
2020	Masked Singer Pilipinas		
2023	Wish Ko Lang: Utang ni Ex		
2026	Born to Shine	Monica Pascual	

== Discography ==
=== Roselle ===
- Label: Ivory Records Corporation
- Release date: 1994
- Certification: PARI: Platinum (40,000 copies sold)

==== Track listing ====
1. You — Best Performance by a Female Recording Artist Awit Awards (1995)
2. Bakit Nga Ba Mahal Kita — Movie soundtrack Mangarap Ka (1995)
3. Is It My Imagination
4. Iba Tayo
5. Ngayon
6. Sana (Ako'y Nasa Langit Na)
7. Wag Mo Na Lang Pansinin
8. Got To Be There
9. Sana'y Di Magtagal
10. Pag-ibig Na Sana (duet with Tony Lambino)

=== Say It Again (1995) ===
- Label: Ivory Records Corporation
- Release date: 1995
- Certification: PARI: Platinum (40,000 copies sold)

==== Track listing ====
1. Waiting For You
2. Say It Again
3. Habang Narito Ako
4. Woncha Dance With Me
5. How Many Ways
6. Kung Saan May Pangarap
7. Nasaan Ka Na?
8. Higit Pa Sa Isang Kaibigan
9. How Can I?
10. Maniniwala Ba Ako?
11. Say That You Love Me — Movie soundtrack Hataw Na (1995)
12. Mula Sa Puso (Movie Theme)

=== On Higher Ground ===
- Label: Star Recording, Inc.
- Release date: 1997
- Certification: PARI: Double Platinum (80,000 copies sold)

==== Track listing ====
1. Dahil Mahal Na Mahal Kita — Movie soundtrack Dahil Mahal Na Mahal Kita (1998)
2. He's Somehow Been (A Part Of Me)
3. Laging Ikaw Pa Rin
4. Para Sa 'Yo
5. Do You Love Me?
6. Please Stay
7. Ikaw Pala
8. I Should Have Never Cried
9. Upang Muli Ay Magmahal
10. Is It A Dream
11. You Are (For Daddy)
12. Nothing's Gonna Make Me (Change)

=== Simply Roselle ===
- Label: Star Recording, Inc.
- Release date: 1999
- Certification: PARI: Gold (20,000 copies sold)

==== Track listing ====
1. Mahal Mo Ba'y Di Na Ako
2. Miles Away
3. Tanging Mamahali'y Ikaw
4. Lost In You
5. Bihag Ng Pag-ibig
6. Dahan-dahan
7. Sana Man Lang
8. Upper Floor
9. Kahit 'Sang Sandali
10. Magbakakasakali Ngayon
11. Get Out
12. Nag-iisang Dahilan

=== All About Love ===
- Label: Star Recording, Inc.
- Release date: 2002
- Certification: PARI: Platinum (40,000 copies sold - Never awarded to Roselle)

==== Track listing ====
1. Huwag Ka Nang Magbabalik
2. Akalain Ko Ba
3. Dahil Ako'y Mahal Mo Na
4. Naiiyak Muli
5. Kung Alam Ko Lang
6. Open
7. Say Goodbye
8. Bakit Ba
9. Love Me Tonight
10. Kung Magmamahal
11. My Love
12. Minamahal, Sinasamba

=== Bare (2004) ===
- Label: Viva Records Corporation
- Release date: 2004

==== Track listing ====
1. Bakit Lumisan Ka?
2. Makakaya Ko Ba?
3. I Really Miss You
4. Kahit Ika'y Panaginip Lang
5. Araw-araw
6. A Prayer Away
7. Someone Help Me Let Go
8. Dahil Kaya Mahal Pa Rin Kita
9. Can't Go On
10. Kulang Pa Ba (Ang Nadarama)
11. Free From You
12. If You Remember Me

=== Forever Love Songs (2009) ===
- Label: Viva Records Corporation
- Release date: 2009

==== Track listing ====
1. No More Rhyme
2. Lost In Space
3. I Love You All The Way
4. Heaven Knows
5. Fixing A Broken Heart
6. What's Forever For
7. What Might Have Been
8. Miss You Like Crazy
9. Looking Through Your Eyes
10. As I Lay Me Down
11. Where Do Broken Hearts Go
12. What I Did For Love

=== Compilation appearances ===
Year	Album	Song(s)	Label(s)
1998	Sa Araw ng Pasko	"Noo'y Pasko Rin"	Star Records

1998 Starstruck album “Dahil Mahal Na Mahal Kita” 1998 2000 Starstruck 3 “Mahal Mo Ba’y Di Na Ako?”

== See also ==
- Jolina Magdangal
- Carol Banawa
- Tootsie Guevara
