= PMPC Star Awards for Best Single Performance by an Actor & Actress =

PMPC Star Awards for Best Single Performance by an Actor and Actress is given to the actor and actress who brilliantly performed in a miniseries, Movie made for television and alike.

== Winners ==
Year	Best Single Performance by an Actor	TV Show	Best Single Performance by an Actress	TV Show
1994			Nora Aunor	Spotlight: Good Morning, Ma'am; GMA 7
1999	Spencer Reyes	Maalaala Mo Kaya: Harang-Taga; ABS-CBN 2	Nida Blanca	Maalaala Mo Kaya: Forcep; ABS-CBN 2
2000	Jericho Rosales	Maalaala Mo Kaya: Pasa; ABS-CBN 2	Lorna Tolentino	Pira-pirasong Pangarap: Tinig ng Kawalan; GMA 7
2001	Michael de Mesa	Maalaala Mo Kaya: Parol; ABS-CBN 2	Monalisa; Princess Ann Shuck	Pira-pirasong Pangarap: Uling; GMA 7
2002	Paolo Contis	Maalaala Mo Kaya: Chicken Feet; ABS-CBN 2	Regine Velasquez	Maalaala Mo Kaya: Lobo; ABS-CBN 2
2003	Carlo Aquino	Tanging Yaman, The Series: Sa Kandungan Mo Inay; ABS-CBN 2	Sunshine Dizon; Cherry Pie Picache	Magpakailanman: Kakaibang Mukha ng Pag-ibig GMA 7 Tanging Yaman, The Series: Sa Kandungan Mo Inay ABS-CBN 2
2004	Roderick Paulate	Maalaala Mo Kaya: Bituin; ABS-CBN 2	Ara Mina	Magpakailanman: Kapag Ang Pag-ibig ay Wagas; GMA 7
2005	Baron Geisler	Maalaala Mo Kaya: Trolley; ABS-CBN 2	Lorna Tolentino	Magpakailanman: ‘Sa Kabila ng AIDS; GMA 7
2006	Carlo Aquino	Maalaala Mo Kaya: Scapular; ABS-CBN 2	Vilma Santos	Maalaala Mo Kaya: Regalo; ABS-CBN 2
2007	Piolo Pascual	Maalaala Mo Kaya: Piso; ABS-CBN 2	Pauleen Luna; Gina Pareño	Magpakailanman: Sa Dulo Ng Pag-Ibig GMA 7 Maalaala Mo Kaya: Rehas, ABS-CBN 2
2008	Joshua Dionisio	Maalaala Mo Kaya: Sako; ABS-CBN 2	Angel Locsin	Maalaala Mo Kaya: Pilat; ABS-CBN 2
2009	Joross Gamboa	Maalaala Mo Kaya: Bisikleta; ABS-CBN 2	Gretchen Barretto; Sunshine Dizon	Magpakailanman: Maalaala Mo Kaya: Salamin / ABS-CBN 2 Obra Presents: Sunshine Dizon / GMA 7
2010	Gerald Anderson	Maalaala Mo Kaya: Lubid; ABS-CBN 2	Gretchen Barretto	Maalaala Mo Kaya: Larawan; ABS-CBN 2
2011	Enchong Dee	Maalaala Mo Kaya: Parol; ABS-CBN 2	Ai-Ai de las Alas	Maalaala Mo Kaya: Krus; ABS-CBN 2
2012	Nonie Buencamino	Maalaala Mo Kaya: Sapatos; ABS-CBN 2	Sylvia Sanchez	Maalaala Mo Kaya: Sapatos; ABS-CBN 2
2013	Carlo Aquino	Maalaala Mo Kaya: Pulan Laso; ABS-CBN	Nikki Gil	Maalaala Mo Kaya: Ilog; ABS-CBN 2
2014	Arjo Atayde; Jose Manalo	Maalaala Mo Kaya: Dos Por Dos, ABS-CBN 2 Eat Bulaga! Lenten Special: "Hulog ng Langit", GMA 7	Sunshine Cruz	Maalaala Mo Kaya: Karayom; ABS-CBN 2
2015	John Lloyd Cruz	Maalaala Mo Kaya: Hat ABS-CBN 2	Sunshine Cruz; Judy Ann Santos	Maalaala Mo Kaya: Barko; ABS-CBN 2 Maalaala Mo Kaya: Ilog; ABS-CBN 2
2016	Kristofer Martin	Magpakailanman: Mag-Ama sa Bilangguan GMA 7	Claudine Barretto	Maalaala Mo Kaya: Itak; ABS-CBN 2
2017	John Estrada; Alden Richards	Maalaala Mo Kaya: Mansanas at Juice; ABS-CBN 2 Eat Bulaga Lenten Special: Kapatid GMA 7	Maricel Soriano	Maalaala Mo Kaya: Baso ABS-CBN 2
2018	James Blanco; Ruru Madrid	Maalaala Mo Kaya: Hapag Kainan; ABS-CBN 2 Magpakailanman: Takbo Ng Buhay Ko; GMA 7	Kim Chiu	Ipaglaban Mo!: Korea; ABS-CBN 2
2019	Enchong Dee; Jeric Gonzales	Maalaala Mo Kaya: Wheelchair; ABS-CBN 2 Magpakailanman: Male Sex Slave sa Saudi; GMA 7	Yasmien Kurdi	Tadhana: Sukdulan; GMA 7
2020	Seth Fedelin	Maalaala Mo Kaya: Ilog; ABS-CBN 2	Sunshine Dizon	Tadhana: Magkano Ang Forever; GMA 7
2021	Arjo Atayde; Joshua Garcia	Maalaala Mo Kaya:Doctor Hero; A2Z-11 Maalaala Mo Kaya: Life's Sketch; A2Z-11	Jennylyn Mercado	Magpakailanman: Sa Kamay ng Fake Healer; GMA-7
2023	Alden Richards	Magpakailanman: Sa Puso At Isipan; GMA-7	Rochelle Pangilinan	Magpakailanman: The Abused Teacher; GMA-7
2024	Paolo Contis	Magpakailanman: A Son's Karma; GMA-7	Gladys Reyes	Magpakailanman: Inaanak, Inanakan; GMA-7

== Actors with Multiple Awards ==
Actor	Record Set
Carlo Aquino	3
Enchong Dee; Paolo Contis	2

== Actress with Multiple Awards ==
Actor	Record Set
Sunshine Dizon	3
Gretchen Barretto; Sunshine Cruz; Lorna Tolentino	2
