= Princess Schuck =

Filipino former actress

- Born: Princess Ann Carreon Schuck; September 23, 1987 (age 39); Philippines
- Occupation: Actress
- Years active: 1992–2006
- Relatives: Empress Schuck (sister)

Princess Schuck (Tagalog pronunciation: [ʃʊk]; born September 23, 1987) is a Filipino former actress.

== Career ==
Schuck started out as a child actress and was one of the child cast of ABS-CBN's Ang TV.

In 1996, she cast in the TV series Familia Zaragoza and appeared in the Star Magic all-star anniversary film Ang TV Movie: The Adarna Adventure.

A year later, she appeared as Camille in "I Hate Boys, I Hate Girls" a special multiple episode installment of the anthology series Flames.

Schuck was part of the 9th batch of actors launched by ABS-CBN in 2000. It featured the reintroduction of former child actors Alwyn Uytingco, Hazel Ann Mendoza, Janus del Prado, Rex Agoncillo and herself as up and coming teen actors.

In 2001, Schuck earned a Best Single Performance by Actress award in the 15th PMPC Star Awards for Television for her appearance in an episode of Pira-pirasong Pangarap.

In 2006, Schuck appeared as Curly in Let's Go!, a cousin of Valerie Garcia's Bangs.

== Personal life ==
Schuck is the eldest child and daughter of Hans Schuck and Gina Carreon. She has 4 younger siblings; brothers Hans Erard, Prince Justin and King Matthew and sister actress Empress Schuck.

== Filmography ==
=== Television ===
Year	Title	Role	Notes	Source
1993	Ang TV	Herself / various roles		
1995	Familia Zaragoza	Lorena		
1996	Maalaala Mo Kaya		Episode: "Leche Flan"	
1997	Flames	Camille	Miniseries: "I Hate Boys, I Hate Girls"	
1997	Maalaala Mo Kaya		Episode: "Pabango, Lipstik at Tsokolate"	
1997	Maalaala Mo Kaya		Episode: "Paper Doll"	
1998	Wansapanataym	Camille	Episode: "Ang Itlog... Bow!"	
1999	Marinella	Cristina		
2001	Ang TV 2	Herself / various roles		
2001	Pira-pirasong Pangarap		Episode: "Uling"	
2002	Maalaala Mo Kaya		Episode: "Bestida"	
2003	Maalaala Mo Kaya		Episode: "Mikropono"	
2006	Let's Go!	Curly	Episode: "Kotse at Curly"	

=== Film ===
Year	Title	Role5	Notes	Source
1996	Sa Aking mga Kamay	Hostaged child		
1996	Daddy's Angel	Bengbeng		
1996	Ang TV Movie: The Adarna Adventure	Court kid		
1996	Rubberman	Little Jessica		
2006	Noriega: God's Favorite	Giroldi's kid		

== Awards and nominations ==
Year	Work	Organizatiom	Category	Result	Source
2001	Pira-pirasong Pangarap; Episode: "Uling"	PMPC Star Awards for Television	Best Single Performance by Actress	Won	
