= Camille Dela Rosa =

Filipino painter

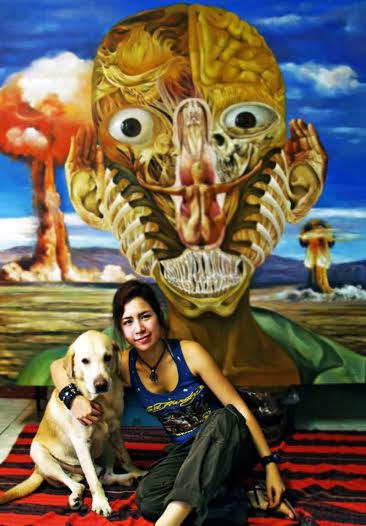
- Camille Dela Rosa with her pet Sendo
- Born: Camille Jean Verdelaire D. Dela Rosa; July 29, 1982 (age 44); Santa Cruz, Manila, Philippines
- Education: University of the Philippines, Diliman
- Known for: Painting

Camille Jean Verdelaire D. Dela Rosa (born 29 July 1982) is a Filipina painter noted for her early impressionist gardens , landscapes, and churches before transitioning to morbid surrealism, creating works that incorporate anatomical details, mythology, existential themes, and portraits of women with esoteric symbolism.

== Early life ==
She is the daughter of the late Ibarra Y. Dela Rosa, a noted painter and professor at Philippine Women's University's College of Fine Arts and Design. Camille's mother, Ethel Dimacuha is also a painter and was a professor in Art History & Humanities at Lyceum of the Philippines, Technological University and St. Scholastica College.

At the age of 10, Camille became part of the original cast member of the iconic children's variety show "Ang TV" that aired on ABS-CBN from year 1992 to 1997.

She was a voice major at the University of the Philippines Diliman, College of Music, but after the demise of her father she decided to be a painter and with her mom as her manager, Camille had her first solo exhibition at the age of 16.

== Career ==
As a self-taught artist, Camille gradually developed a distinct style separate from her father’s work, transitioning from impressionism toward surrealism with darker thematic elements. She has received recognition in several Philippine art competitions, including an Honorable Mention at the Art Association of the Philippines Competition (2005), a Top 40 placement at the Philippine Art Awards (2009), and second place at the Pagalingan Pinay Art Competition (2009).

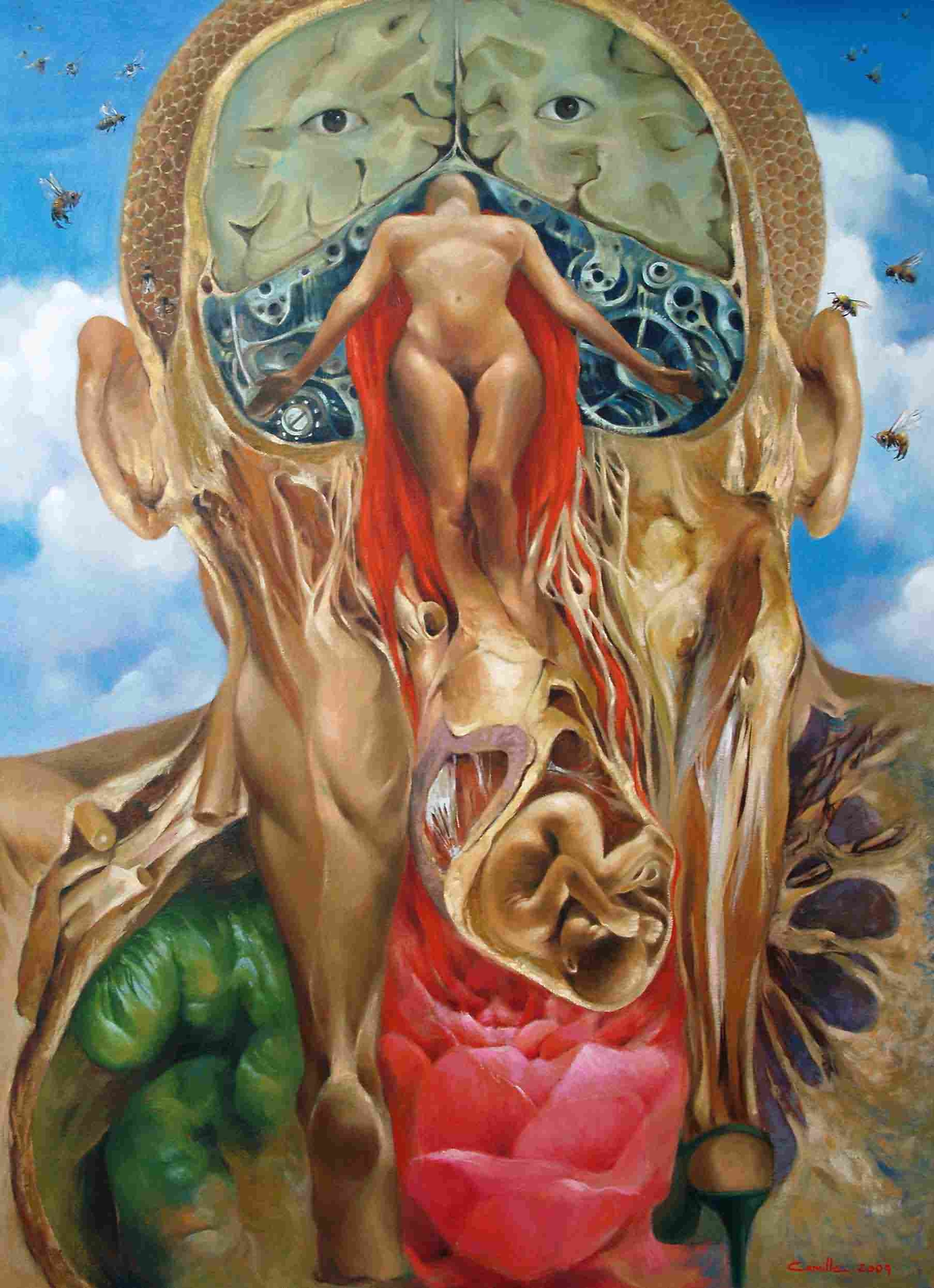
"The Virgin of the Rose" oil on canvas by Camille Dela Rosa, 40x30 inches (2nd Place Award at Pagalingan Pinay Painting Competition 2009)

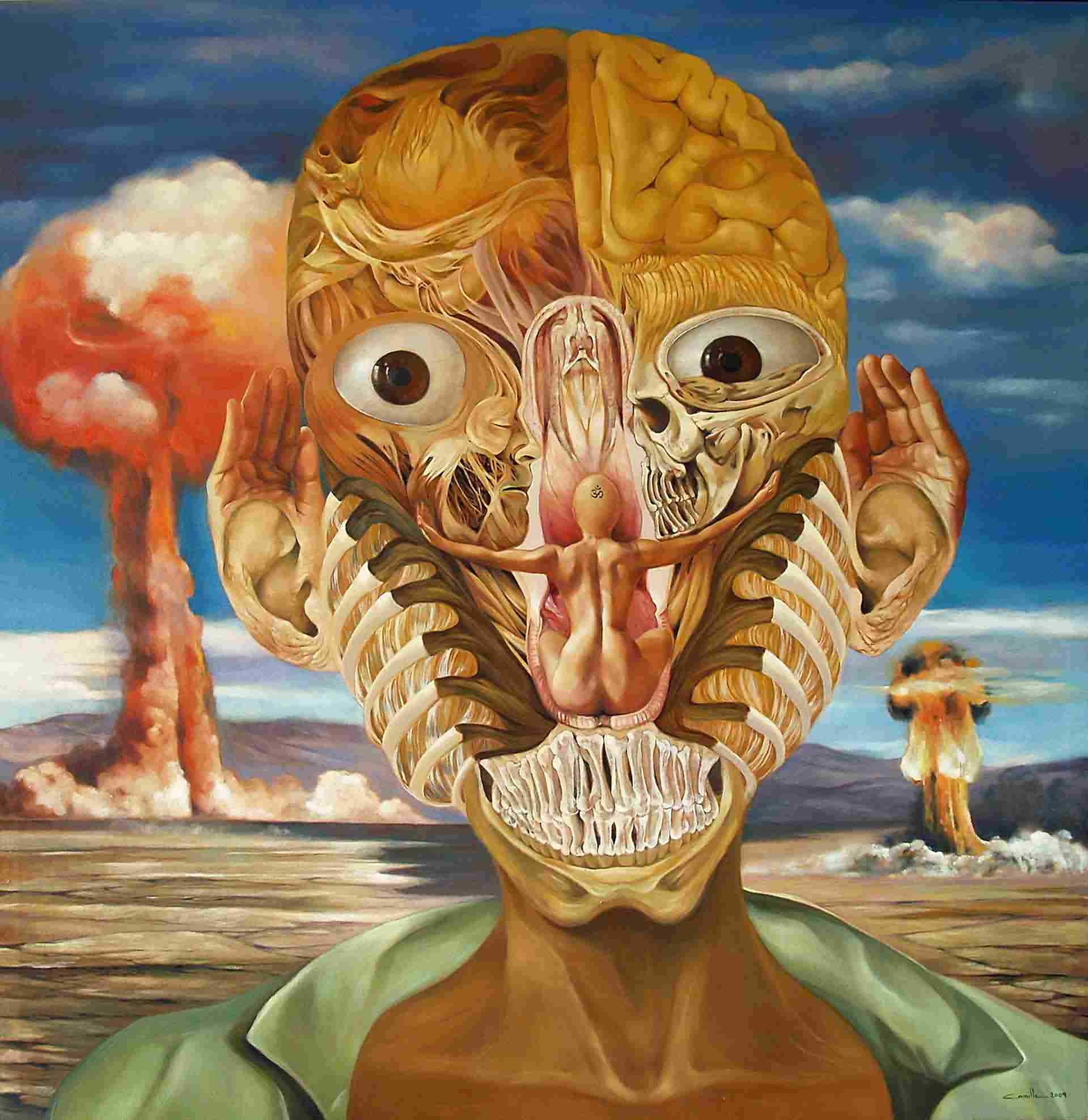
"Those who have ears, hear.. Those who have eyes, see" 6x6 feet, oil on canvas by Camille Dela Rosa (Top 40 at Philippine Art Awards 2009)

In 2017, her steampunk-themed painting was selected as the official CD and DVD album cover for Machine Messiah by the Brazilian metal band Sepultura.

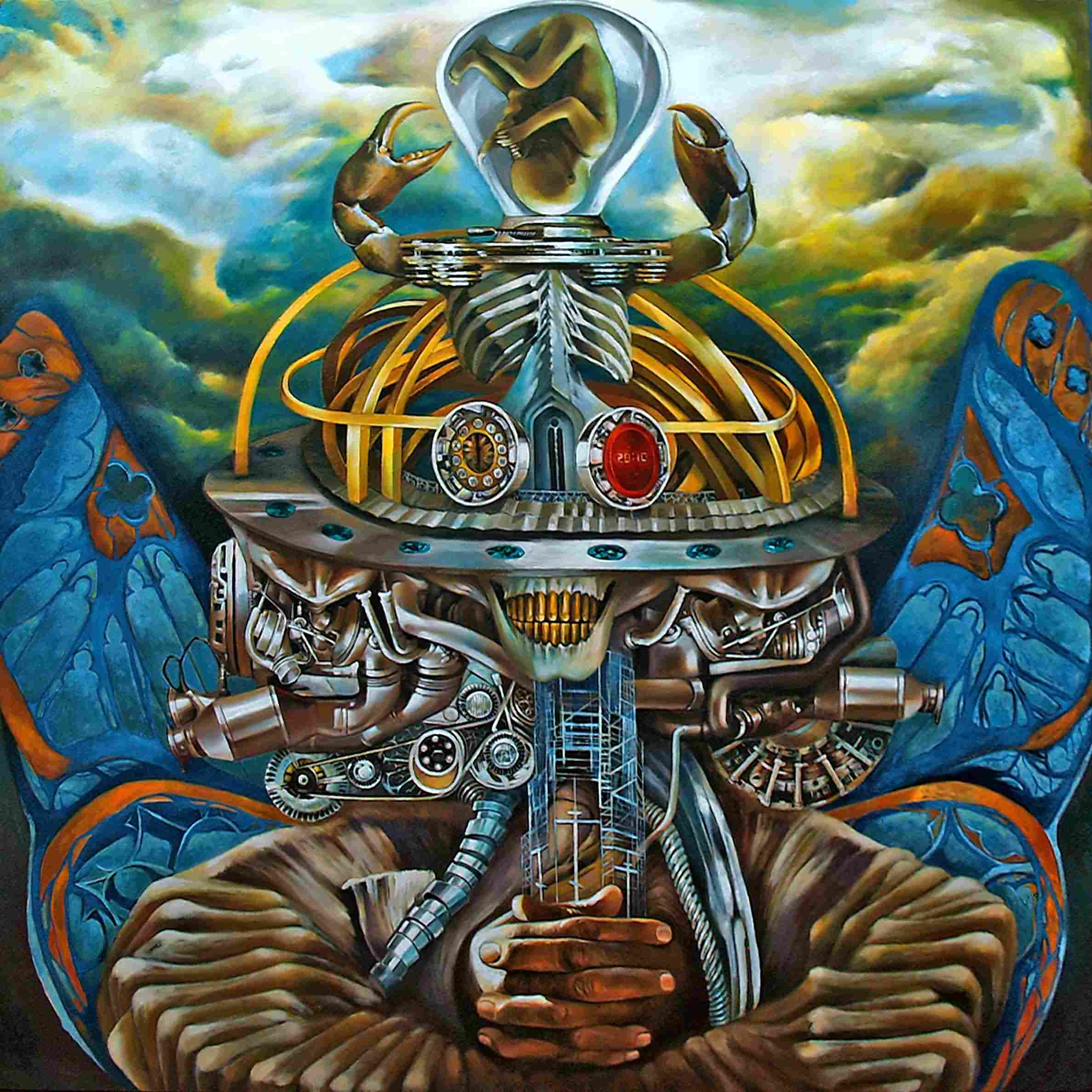
"Machine Messiah" Sepultura's Album Cover- Painting Details- Deux ex Machina, 48x48 inches, oil on canvas by Camille Dela Rosa year 2011

Her work was also featured in Phantastische Venus (2015), an international exhibition held in Viechtach, Germany, showcasing works by 70 female surrealist artists from around the world.

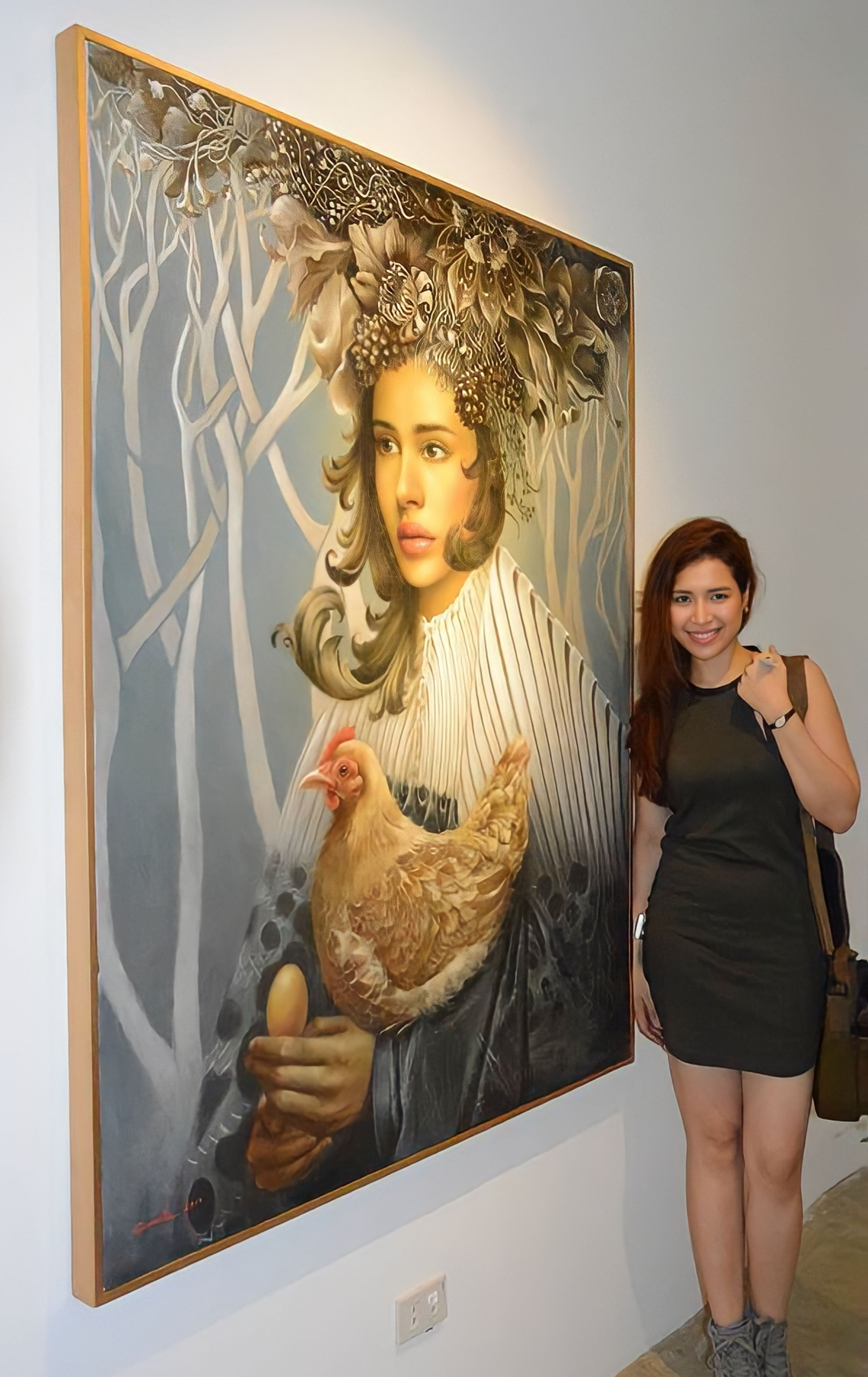
Camille Dela Rosa with her painting at the artist reception of "Enchantress" 23rd Solo Exhibit, year 2015
