= Christian Civic League of Maine =

American political lobbying group

- Established: 1897
- Tax ID no.: 01-0044660 (EIN)
- Headquarters: 70 Sewall Street, Augusta, Maine
- Key people: Carroll Conley, Executive Director
- Revenue: $276,756 (2017)
- Website: cclmaine.org

The Christian Civic League of Maine is a political lobbying group founded to support prohibition of alcohol and later advocating for various conservative Christian policies in the state of Maine. It is the Focus on the Family affiliate organization (known as a Family Policy Council) for Maine, and its policy priorities today resemble that of this parent organization. It has worked to oppose same-sex marriage and adoption, censor pornography, oppose gambling, legally permit LGBT employment discrimination, and support conversion therapy.

== History ==
=== Founding ===
The Christian Civic League of Maine was founded in 1897 in Fort Fairfield, Maine for the purpose of "the suppression of the saloons." At the League's first organizational meeting in Waterville, Bowdoin College president William DeWitt Hyde served as the first (temporary) chairman. A mass Temperance movement was sweeping the United States at this time, particularly Maine, which had passed the nation's first prohibition law in 1851. Many similar Temperance organizations were founded in the 19th century. The Temperance movement declined during Prohibition in the 1920s and 1930s, and most Temperance organizations ended. The Christian Civic League of Maine would prove to be unusually durable, advocating for the prohibition of alcohol into the 1980s.

=== Benjamin Bubar tenure ===
In March 1949, Maine considered a bill legalizing the sale of wine in grocery stores. The Christian Civic League denounced this as "an attempt to Europeanize our consumption of liquor." The attempt was defeated.

The next month, Maine representative Ben Bubar introduced a prohibition bill. When his bill failed, Bubar became angry with the Christian Civic League for not supporting his bill strongly enough because they were focused on anti-gambling bills instead. Bubar had tried alcohol one time in his life, and his displeasure with the experience lead him to dedicate his career to teetotaling. Bubar would begin working at the Christian Civic League in 1952, serving as its head until 1983.

Throughout the 1960 the Christian Civic League lead campaigns to outlaw the sale of alcohol on Sunday. They opposed a 1966 vote recount when an apparent vote miscount favored their side.

Bubar ran for president in 1976 and 1980 as nominee of the Prohibition Party.

=== Jasper Wyman tenure ===
A former member of the Maine House, Jasper Wyman, succeeded Bubar as the head of the League in 1983. Wyman turned the organization away from temperance and anti-gambling and toward issues of sexual morality, education, and welfare.

LGBT activists in 1985 proposed a gay civil rights bill, LD 1249, although the strength of the Christian Civic League's lobbying caused debate among activists about the merit of even introducing the bill. LD 1249 did not pass.

Wyman and the League sponsored a 1986 ballot measure to censor pornography. Under the proposed law, the sale of anything that appeals to "the prurient interest in sex" would have been punishable by a jail term of five years. A coalition of Maine feminist groups defeated the law.

In 1992 Wyman called for a donor boycott of the United Way of Greater Portland because they banned sexual orientation bias.

Wyman described himself in 1992 as opposed to abortion but "pro-choices." Wyman said his organization had learned a lesson from the ineffectiveness of prohibition. "I don't see us resolving this by force of law. The only thing we can do is persuade women and men by offering better choices." Wyman expressed support for sex education and welfare for pregnant women, and said that "pro-lifers must drop their unreasonable and indefensible opposition to birth control."

Wyman left the Civic League in 1994 to run for governor, but lost the primary to Susan Collins.

=== Michael Heath tenure ===
In 1997 the Maine Legislature passed a law prohibiting discrimination based on sexual orientation. Michael Heath, now head of the Christian Civic League, commented "discrimination is not necessarily a bad thing" because "it's appropriate to discriminate against wrongdoing."

Under Heath, the League pushed to overturn the law in 1998. Maine became the first US state to repeal a gay rights statute. Heath attributed the success to Maine residents who "have appropriate moral concerns with homosexuality and bisexuality."

The League handed out anti-gay leaflets at a 2003 civil rights conference where the play The Laramie Project was to be performed. They called it "homosexual indoctrination for 13-year-olds."

Michael Heath asked the public to send him "tips, rumors, speculation and facts" about lawmakers and other state officials who might be gay in 2004. Heath planned on outing gay officials on the League's website. He was widely criticized for this request and placed on one-month administrative leave from the League.

In March 2005, Governor John Baldacci signed a law extending the Maine Human Rights Act to make discrimination based on sexual orientation illegal in employment, housing, credit, public accommodations and education. The Christian Civic League opposed the change, claiming the law would lead to gay marriage, though this was already banned under existing Maine law. The League held rallies in 2005 to condemn the LGBT protection, and supported a referendum to repeal it.

"Outraged" by California's 2008 decision to legalize gay marriage, the League started a petition drive to permit discrimination against gay and lesbians in employment and other areas, to prohibit unmarried and gay adoption, to prohibit civil unions, and to reaffirm Maine's prohibition of gay marriage. Heath called all LGBT rights "special rights based on sexual misbehavior."

Maine would briefly legalize gay marriage in 2009, then repeal the measure in the same year.

=== Carroll Conley tenure ===
Under executive director Carroll Conley, the Christian Civic League of Maine made another push against gay marriage in 2012, when LGBT activists were working to restore its legality. The ballot question passed, and same-sex marriage has been legal in Maine since 2012.

The League opposed the opening of casinos by Maine's tribal nations in 2018.

In 2019, the organization attempted to keep conversion therapy (the pseudoscientific practice of trying to change an person's sexual orientation) legal in Maine. The League gathered signatures supporting the veto of a law providing abortion care through medical insurance, but failed to gather enough to put the question on the ballot.

== Tax violations ==
Investigative reporter Christine Young discovered that the League had violated IRS rules on funneling donations into campaigns against gay rights and abortion. The reporter and her TV station, WMTW received the DuPont Award in 2000 for investigating the tax violations.
