= Kailan Ba Tama ang Mali? =

2015 Philippine television drama series

- Title card
- Also known as: Ruins of Love
- Genre: Romantic drama
- Based on: Kailan Ba Tama ang Mali? (1986) by Celso Ad. Castillo
- Directed by: Gil Tejada Jr.
- Creative director: Roy Iglesias
- Starring: Max Collins; Geoff Eigenmann; Empress Schuck; Dion Ignacio
- Theme music composer: Pearisha Abubakar
- Opening theme: "Kailan Ba Tama ang Mali?" by Jonalyn Viray
- Country of origin: Philippines
- Original language: Tagalog
- No. of episodes: 63

Production
- Executive producer: Mary Joy Lumboy-Pili
- Production locations: Quezon City, Philippines
- Camera setup: Multiple-camera setup
- Running time: 30–45 minutes
- Production company: GMA Entertainment TV

Original release
- Network: GMA Network
- Release: February 9 – May 8, 2015

Kailan Ba Tama ang Mali? (transl. when is it right to be wrong? / international title: Ruins of Love) is a 2015 Philippine television drama romance series broadcast by GMA Network. The series is based on a 1986 Philippine film of the same title. Directed by Gil Tejada Jr., it stars Max Collins, Geoff Eigenmann, Empress Schuck and Dion Ignacio. It premiered on February 9, 2015 on the network's Afternoon Prime line up. The series concluded on May 8, 2015, with a total of 63 episodes.

== Cast and characters ==
Cast

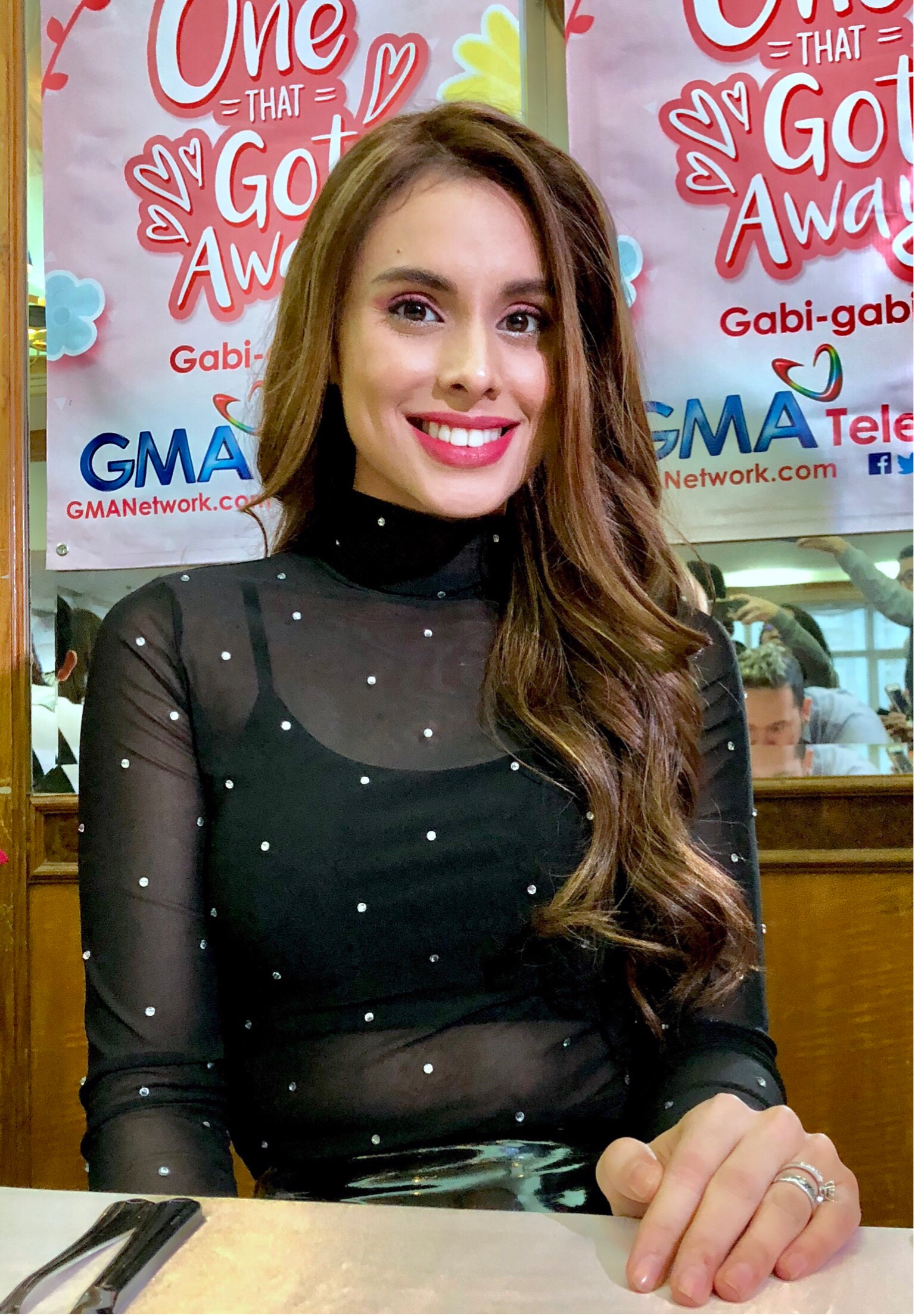
Max Collins

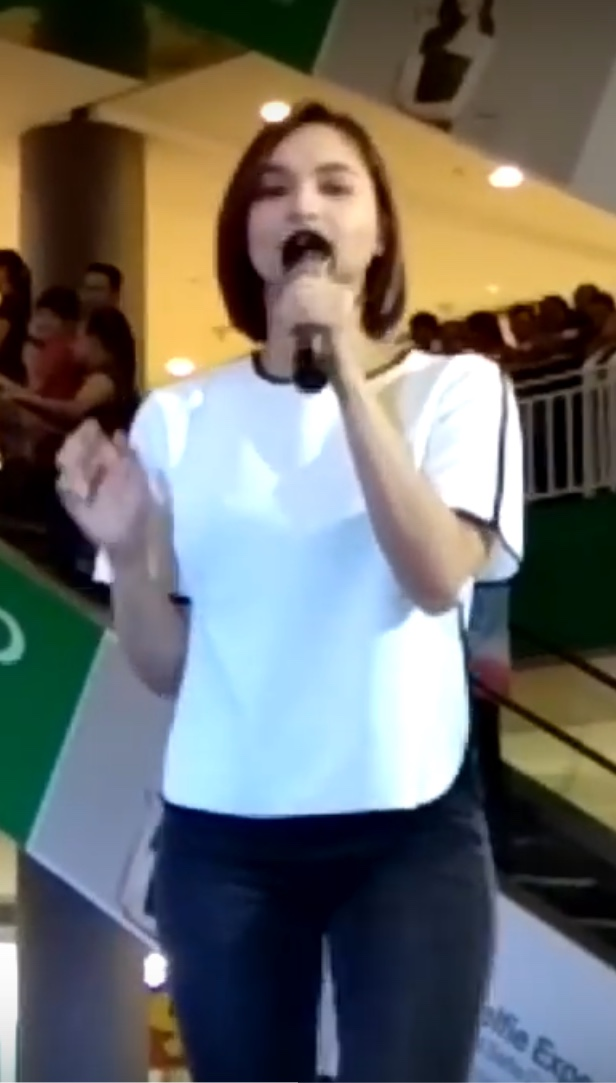
Ryza Cenon

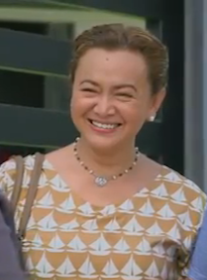
Sharmaine Buencamino

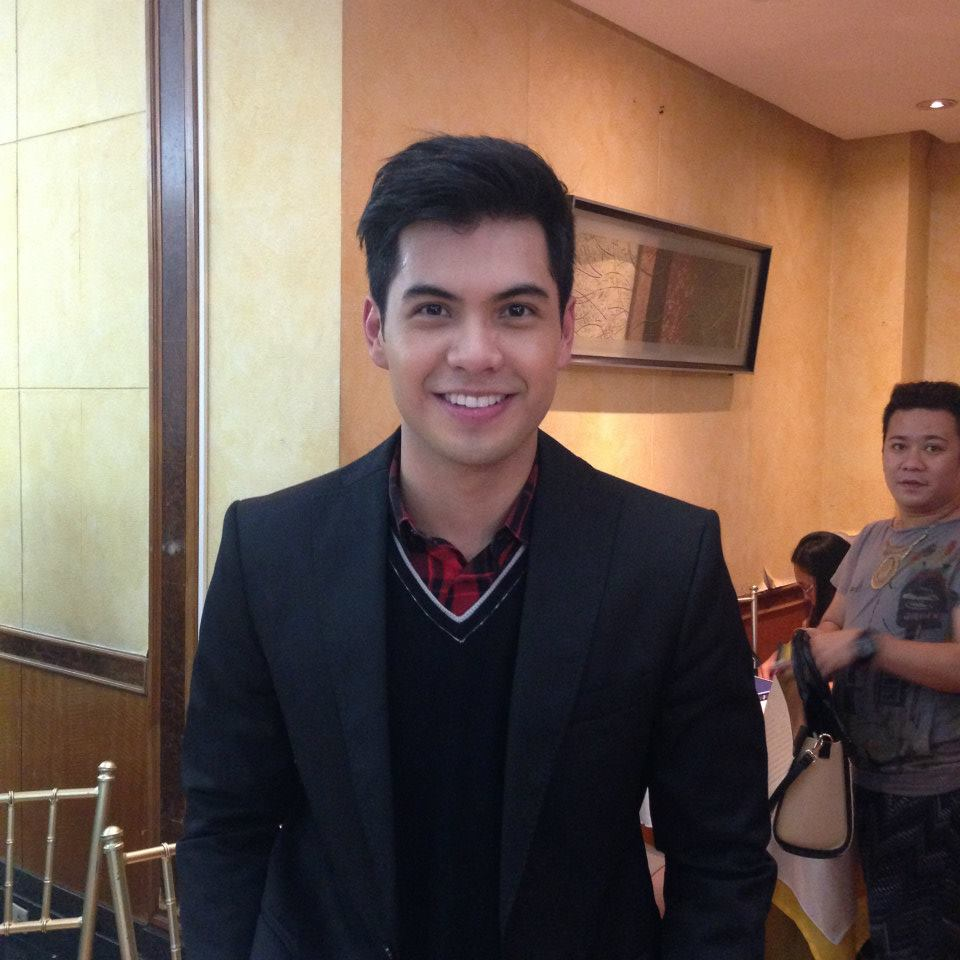
Ken Alfonso

Lead cast

- Max Collins as Amanda Realonda-Vasquez
- Geoff Eigenmann as Leonardo "Leo" Vasquez
- Dion Ignacio as Oliver Mallari
- Empress Schuck as Sonya Barcial

Supporting cast

- Shamaine Centenera-Buencamino as Aurora "Auring" Realonda
- Ryza Cenon as Margarita "Rita" Barcial
- Chariz Solomon as Bianca Quillamor
- Ash Ortega as Angeli Realonda
- Ervic Vijandre as Joseph Dela Cruz
- Ken Alfonso as Thomas Alejandro
- Mike Lloren as Randy Dela Cruz
- Lander Vera Perez as Victor Realonda

== Ratings ==
Kailan Ba Tama ang Mali ratings
No.	Original air date	AGB Nielsen Mega Manila Households Television Homes
1	February 9, 2015	11.4%
2	February 10, 2015	11.3%
3	February 11, 2015	12.0%
4	February 12, 2015	10.7%
5	February 13, 2015	11.0%
6	February 16, 2015	10.6%
7	February 17, 2015	11.3%
8	February 18, 2015	11.7%
9	February 19, 2015	12.3%
10	February 20, 2015	12.5%
11	February 23, 2015	11.0%
12	February 24, 2015	11.7%
13	February 25, 2015	12.6%
14	February 26, 2015	12.1%
15	February 27, 2015	11.6%
16	March 2, 2015	10.9%
17	March 3, 2015	11.0%
18	March 4, 2015	11.0%
19	March 5, 2015	12.0%
20	March 6, 2015	11.4%
21	March 9, 2015	10.0%
22	March 10, 2015	12.1%
23	March 11, 2015	13.1%
24	March 12, 2015	11.5%
25	March 13, 2015	11.4%
26	March 16, 2015	11.0%
27	March 17, 2015	12.2%
28	March 18, 2015	12.8%
29	March 19, 2015	11.6%
30	March 20, 2015	11.6%
31	March 23, 2015	12.3%
32	March 24, 2015	13.1%
33	March 25, 2015	12.8%
34	March 26, 2015	12.3%
35	March 27, 2015	12.4%
36	March 30, 2015	11.6%
37	March 31, 2015	12.1%
38	April 1, 2015	11.6%
39	April 6, 2015	14.0%
40	April 7, 2015	14.7%
41	April 8, 2015	14.2%
42	April 9, 2015	13.4%
43	April 10, 2015	13.9%
44	April 13, 2015	14.1%
45	April 14, 2015	13.8%
46	April 15, 2015	14.7%
47	April 16, 2015	14.3%
48	April 17, 2015	13.2%
49	April 20, 2015	13.8%
50	April 21, 2015	14.6%
51	April 22, 2015	12.3%
52	April 23, 2015	15.6%
53	April 24, 2015	14.8%
54	April 27, 2015	12.7%
55	April 28, 2015	14.1%
56	April 29, 2015	13.0%
57	April 30, 2015	13.4%
58	May 1, 2015	12.6%
59	May 4, 2015	13.9%
60	May 5, 2015	14.9%
61	May 6, 2015	14.1%
62	May 7, 2015	14.5%
63	May 8, 2015	15.5%

== Production ==
Principal photography concluded in April 2015.

== Accolades ==
Accolades received by Kailan Ba Tama ang Mali?
Year	Award	Category	Recipient	Result	Ref.
2015	29th PMPC Star Awards for Television	Best Daytime Drama Series	Kailan Ba Tama ang Mali?	Nominated	
2015	29th PMPC Star Awards for Television	Best Drama Actress	Empress Schuck	Nominated	
