= Christine Young =

American investigative journalist

Christine Young is an American investigative journalist and author of the book A Bitter Brew: Faith, Power and Poison in a Small New England Town, which documented the largest case of criminal arsenic poisoning in American history.

Young is currently completing a book to be published in 2026, centered around a 1987 murder case and alleged wrongful conviction in New York City. Young, who raised questions about the case even before the 1989 trial, claims the case highlights systemic issues in New York's criminal justice system, including allegations of racism, misogyny, and abuses of power. Young alleges the criminal justice system enabled injustices and contributed to broader systemic failings.

== Early years and education ==
Young was born in Hollis, Queens, New York. When she was seven, her father became an FBI agent and was eventually transferred to FBI headquarters in Washington, DC. Her mother Joan was a registered nurse. Young grew up in Springfield, Virginia, graduating from West Springfield High School. She received a BA in Arts & Humanities from the University of Southern Maine and MS in Journalism from Columbia University, where she was a Knight-Bagehot Fellow in Economics and Business Journalism.

== Career ==
Young began her career at WMTW, the ABC affiliate in Portland, Maine, where her reporting, profiled on A&E's Cold Case Files and TruTV's Forensic Files, led police to the remains of Pearl Bruns, a South Portland grandmother who was found buried in the basement of her home after she was beaten to death by her husband.

In 1996, Young led the first television camera crew into the world's largest brown egg production facility, Decoster Eggs, where she documented working conditions for migrant workers that she described as dangerous and inhumane. Later, Young's reporting uncovered allegations of financial irregularities and illegal election practices within Christian Civic League of Maine, a conservative lobbying group responsible for overturning Maine's gay rights law.

Young's 2005 book, A Bitter Brew: Faith, Power and Poison in a Small New England Town, documented a 2003 arsenic poisoning that took place at a small Lutheran church in New Sweden, Maine, killing one church member and making 15 others critically ill. While Maine State Police and many church members theorized that someone had helped the poisoner, lifelong member Daniel Bondeson, Young's book argued that Bondeson acted alone, countering theories that suggested others were involved. In 2006, the Maine Attorney General agreed that Bondeson had acted alone and closed the case.

In 2006, Young began investigating the facts behind the 1987 Hell's Kitchen murder of a young prostitute from Buffalo, New York, Michaelanne Hall, and the conviction of an intellectually challenged security guard, Lebrew Jones. Suspecting Jones had been wrongfully convicted, but Jones was released from prison in 2009 after the New York County District Attorney's Office reopened his case after Young raised questions about the state’s case against Jones.

In December 2009, Young's series of multimedia stories on the Jones case was highlighted in testimony before the Federal Trade Commission by Karen Dunlap, president of the journalism think tank Poynter Institute. Jones, the son of Count Basie and Duke Ellington jazz drummer Rufus "Speedy" Jones, served 22 years in prison before winning an early release that legal and media experts attributed to Young's reporting.

== Awards and honors ==
Young is the recipient of the Alfred I. duPont-Columbia University Award Silver Baton for Excellence in Investigative Reporting; the National Headliner Award for Broadcast Investigative Reporting; the Clarion Award for Investigative Reporting; an RTNDA Edward R. Murrow Award for Investigative Reporting; the Society of Professional Journalists Sigma Delta Chi Award for Investigative Reporting; the Online News Association's Online Journalism Award for Investigative reporting; and the Excellence in Criminal Justice Reporting Award from John Jay College of Criminal Justice. She has also received the New York Newspaper Publishers Association's Distinguished Investigative Reporting Award; the New York Associated Press Writing Award, and the New York Associated Press Award, Beat Reporting, for her coverage of IBM..
