= Filipino German =

Filipino German or German Filipino may be:

- Filipino mestizos of German ancestry
- Filipinos in Germany
- Germans in the Philippines; see German settlement in the Philippines
- Of or relating to Germany–Philippines relations

== See also ==
- Category:Filipino people of German descent
