= Marco Liserre =

Italian electrical engineer

Marco Liserre is a University Professor in electrical engineering, currently Head of the Chair of Power Electronics at the University of Kiel in Kiel, Germany. He was named a Fellow of the Institute of Electrical and Electronics Engineers (IEEE) in 2013. He is Deputy Director of Fraunhofer ISIT and Founder of ISIT@CAU, 2022. Liserre was also honored with the IEEE PELS R. David Middlebrook Achievement Award for the year 2023.

== Biography ==
Liserre received his MSc and PhD degrees in 1998 and 2002, respectively from Bari Polytechnic in Electrical Engineering. He served as an Associate Professor there at Bari Polytechnic and from 2012, he was a Professor in reliable power electronics at Aalborg University Denmark. From September 16, 2013, he is full professor and head of the Chair of Power Electronics, Kiel University, Kiel, Germany. He has published several technical papers and patented some of his major scientific contributions. He also published a book in the area of grid connected power electronic converters titled "Grid Converters for Photovoltaic and Wind Power Systems". He is listed in ISI Thomson report "The world's most influential scientific minds" from 2014. He has been awarded with an ERC Consolidator Grant for the project "The Highly Efficient And Reliable smart Transformer (HEART), a new Heart for the Electric Distribution System". He is the founder and convenor of the CIGRE Working Group "Power electronics-based transformer technology, design, grid integration and services provision to the distribution grid".

== Awards and recognition ==
He has been awarded with IEEE PES Working Group Award for the technical report “Microgrid Stability Definitions, Analysis, and Examples". In addition, he has received several awards for his contributions, including the IEEE Mittelmann Achievement Award in 2018. He is in the list of highly cited researcher in the field of engineering since 2014.
