= Empress Schuck =

Filipino actress (born 1993)

- Born: Empress Karen Carreon Schuck; February 19, 1993 (age 33); Quezon City, Philippines
- Occupation: Actress
- Years active: 1995–present
- Agent: Star Magic
- Spouse: Vicente "Vino" Guingona (m. 2021)
- Children: 1
- Relatives: Princess Schuck (sister)

Empress Karen Carreon Schuck-Guingona (Tagalog: [ˈɛmprɛs ʃʊk]; born February 19, 1993), also known mononymously as Empress, is a Filipino actress.

== Early life ==
Schuck was born on February 19, 1993, in Quezon City to Filipino-German events singer Hans Schuck and a Filipino mother. She is the fourth of six children: brothers Hans Erard, Prince Justen and King Matthew, and sister Princess, who is also an actress.

== Career ==
Schuck started in Vaseline shampoo commercial as a model when she was 6 years old in 1999.

In 2000, Schuck was discovered by ABS-CBN when she was 7 years old. At 11 years old, Schuck appeared in Bida Si Mister, Bida Si Misis. Schuck's first movie was 9 Mornings, when she was 9 years old.

In 2003 she won the Most Popular Child Actress in the 2003 Guillermo Mendoza Memorial Scholarship Foundation.

Schuck was seen on GMA Network when she played the role of Young Cassopeia in Etheria. She also appeared in Super Inggo as Ava Avaniko. Schuck was known as Hillary in Star Magic Presents: Abt Ur Luv and Star Magic Presents: Abt Ur Luv, Ur Lyf 2.

She appeared on Your Song Presents: Underage where she played the role of Cecilia.

On February 9, 2015, Schuck appeared in the drama series Kailan Ba Tama ang Mali?.

As of 2017, she is already a freelancer actress but more usually appears in GMA Network.

In 2018 she portrayed a young version of Lilet in My Special Tatay.

== Personal life ==
On March 6, 2021, Schuck married Vino Guingona, grandson of former vice-president Teofisto Guingona Jr., at Hillcreek Gardens in Tagaytay, Cavite. They have one daughter, Athalia. In 2024, Schuck revealed that she had a miscarriage. In 2026, she and Guingona announced that they were expecting another daughter.

== Filmography ==
=== Film ===
Year	Title	Role	Notes	Ref.
2002	9 Mornings	Sandy del Rosario		
2006	Pacquiao: The Movie	Young Isidra		
2006	Shake, Rattle & Roll 8	Nina	Segment: "LRT"	
2007	Angels	Nina		
2007	Resiklo	Gila		
2008	Magkaibigan	Katrina		
2009	Hilot	Carmen		
2009	Pasang Krus	Rossana		
2009	BFF (Best Friends Forever)	Nina		
2009	Ang Darling Kong Aswang	Keka		
2010	Sa 'Yo Lamang	Agnes		
2010	Working Girls	Sylvia Cobarrubias		
2010	I'll Be There	Portia		
2010	Rosario	Soledad Velez		
2010	Dalaw	Marietta		
2012	Guni-Guni	Joanna		
2012	Amorosa	Sandra Bernardo		
2012	Shake, Rattle and Roll Fourteen: The Invasion	Cynthia	Segment: "Pamana"	
2013	Tuhog	Angel		
2013	On the Job	Tina		
2013	Pagpag: Siyam na Buhay	Zarina		
2014	Beauty in a Bottle	Herself		
2015	Modus	Kristine		
2016	Ang Tatay Kong Sexy	Mariel		
2017	Throwback Today	Andie		
2018	Badge of Honor: To Serve and Protect	PCpt. Melinda Mallari		
2018	Goyo: Ang Batang Heneral	Señorita Felicidad "Neneng" Aguinaldo		
2018	Kahit Ayaw Mo Na	Joey		
2025	Jeongbu			

=== Television ===
Year	Title	Role	Notes	Source
1995	Palibhasa Lalake	Ruby		
1997	Oka Tokat	Susie	Guest	
1998	Y2K: Yes 2 Kids	Herself/host		
1999	G-mik	Young Orphan		
2000	Munting Anghel	Bubbles		
2001	Ikaw Lang Ang Mamahalin	Young Clarissa		
2001	Batang Vidaylin	Herself		
2001	Recuerdo de Amor	Young Luisa Arellano		
2002	Ang Iibigin Ay Ikaw	Elmina		
2003	Chikiting Patrol	Herself/host		
2005	Etheria: Ang Ikalimang Kaharian ng Encantadia	Young Cassiopea		
2005	Maalaala Mo Kaya	Yam	Episode: "Diary"	
2006	Super Inggo	Ava Avanico		
2006–2014	ASAP	Herself / Performer / Host		
2006	Maalaala Mo Kaya	Jasmin	Episode: Korte	
2006	Star Magic Presents: Abt Ur Luv	Hillary Smith		
2006	Your Song Presents: Let It Snow	Carol		
2007	Dalawang Tisoy			
2007	Love Spell Presents: Barbi-Cute		Guest	
2007	Star Magic Presents: Abt Ur Luv Ur Lyf 2	Hillary Smith		
2007	Mars Ravelo's Lastikman	Madonna Puntawe		
2007	Your Song Presents: Santa Clause	Carol		
2008	Star Magic Presents: Astigs in Haay...School Life	April		
2008	Star Magic Presents: Astigs in Luvin' Lyf	Reema		
2008	Maalaala Mo Kaya	Young Angge	Episode: "Basura"	
2008	Maalaala Mo Kaya	Rhea/Lester	Episode: "Sumbrero"	
2008	Maalaala Mo Kaya	Rahina	Episode: "Bracelet"	
2008	Maalaala Mo Kaya		Episode: "Salamin"	
2008	Your Song Presents: Imposible	Melanie "Melai" Raymundo		
2009	Pare Koy	Dally		
2009	Your Song Presents: Underage	Cecilia Serrano		
2009	Goals & Girls	Herself/Guest		
2009	Maalaala Mo Kaya	Teen Coring	Episode: "Bangka"	
2009	May Bukas Pa	Danica Valera		
2010	Agimat: Ang Mga Alamat ni Ramon Revilla: Pepeng Agimat	Helen San Simarin		
2010	Rosalka	Rosa Dimaano / Sophia	Credited as "Empress"	
2010	PO5	Herself/Guest		
2010	Wansapanataym	Fina	Episode: "Ali Badbad en da Madyik Banig"	
2010	Shoutout!	Herself – Host/Performer		
2011	Shoutout!: Level Up	Herself – Host / Performer		
2011	Your Song Presents: Kim	Michelle Mercado		
2011	Maalaala Mo Kaya	Anna	Episode: "Pictures"	
2011	100 Days to Heaven	Gina Bernardo		
2011	Guns and Roses	Joanne "Joni" Dela Rocha		
2011	Wansapanataym	Trina	Episode: "OMG, Oh My Ghost"	
2011	Ikaw Ay Pag-Ibig	Nene		
2012	E-Boy	Teen Ria Villareal		
2012	Mundo Man ay Magunaw	Sheryl San Juan		
2012	Wansapanataym	Regina	Episode: "I'll Be Home For Christmas"	
2012	Maalaala Mo Kaya	Roanna	Episode: "Police Uniform"	
2013	Maalaala Mo Kaya	Lani	Episode: "Letter"	
2013	Apoy sa Dagat	Young Adrianna "Andeng" Lamayre		
2013	Huwag Ka Lang Mawawala	Iris Diomedes		
2013	Maalaala Mo Kaya	Claire	Episode: "Picture"	
2014	Maalaala Mo Kaya	Iza Calzado	Episode: "Pagkain"	
2014	Maalaala Mo Kaya	Jenny	Episode: "Bus"	
2014	Ipaglaban Mo!	April	Episode: "Akin Ka Lang"	
2014	Maynila	Eliza		
2015	Kailan Ba Tama ang Mali?	Sonya Barcial		
2015	Sunday All Stars	Herself	Performer / Host	
2015	Beautiful Strangers	Maureen	Guest	
2015	Wagas	Cynthia	Episode: "Hector & Cynthia Love Story"	
2016	Someone to Watch Over Me	Cynthia Villacastro		
2017	Ipaglaban Mo	Lenny	Episode: "Paso"	
2017	Karelasyon	Kristel	Episode: "Finale"	
2017	Wish Ko Lang!	Marga	Episode: "Sunog"	
2017	My Love from the Star	Damsel Villa	Guest appearance	
2017	Tadhana	Julie	Episode: "Thailand"	
2017	Maalaala Mo Kaya		Episode: "Super Dad"	
2017	Trops	Monet		
2017	Maalaala Mo Kaya	Liza	Episode: "Karayom"	
2017	Alyas Robin Hood	Young Judy		
2017	Kambal, Karibal	Young Ma. Anicia Enriquez		
2018	Asintado	Dra. Monalisa "Mona" Calata		
2018	My Special Tatay	Young Isay		
2018	Imbestigador	Leah	Episode: "Testigo"	
2018	Ipaglaban Mo!	Patricia Cruz	Episode: "Dalisay"	
2019	Hiram na Anak	Rowena "Wena" Barrion		
2019	Sahaya	Casilda		
2019	Imbestigador	Girlie Masota	Episode: "Girlie Masota Murder Case"	
2019	The Better Woman	Young Erlinda		
2019	Ipaglaban Mo!	Elena	Episode: "Pagkukulang"	
2020	Maalaala Mo Kaya	Dette	Episode: "Tattoo"	
2020	Bawal na Game Show	Herself / Contestant	Pilot episode	
2021–present	ASAP	Herself		
2022	The Broken Marriage Vow	Grace Jimenez		
2025	It’s Okay to Not Be Okay	young Ingrid Hernandez		
2026	The Secrets of Hotel 88	Marina dela Paz		

=== Music videos ===
Year	Title	Artist
2013	Mahal na Mahal	Sam Concepcion

== Awards and nominations ==
Year	Award	Category	Work	Result	Source
2003	2003 FAMAS Awards	Best Child Actress	9 Mornings	Won	
2007	33rd Metro Manila Film Festival	Best Supporting Actress	Resiklo	Nominated	
2015	29th PMPC Star Awards for Television	Best Drama Actress	Kailan Ba Tama ang Mali?	Nominated	

Preceded by LJ Reyes	FHM Cover Girl (March 2013)	Succeeded by Sunshine Cruz
