= Paquito Diaz =

Filipino actor and director (1932-2011)

Paquito Díaz
- Born: Francisco Bustillos Diaz; May 28, 1932; Arayat, Pampanga, Philippine Commonwealth
- Died: March 3, 2011 (aged 78); Daraga, Albay, Philippines
- Resting place: Manila Memorial Park, Parañaque, Metro Manila
- Other name: The King of Kontrabidas
- Occupations: Actor; Director
- Years active: 1958–2005
- Spouse: Nena Gutierrez
- Children: 2
- Relatives: Romy Diaz (brother); Kiko Estrada (grandson)
- Basketball career

Career information
- High school: FEU (Manila)
- College: Ateneo

Paquito Diaz (born Francisco Bustillos Diaz Sr.; May 28, 1932 – March 3, 2011), was a veteran Filipino actor and movie director. He specialized in antagonist roles for both action and comedy films.

== Biography ==
=== Early life and career ===
Diaz was born in Arayat, Pampanga, Philippines to Silvino Diaz and Maria Bustillos.

He had eight siblings, including Romy Diaz. He was famous for his villain roles, although he also had the ability to portray protagonist roles, mostly supporting, or as comic relief alongside his longtime friend Fernando Poe Jr.

Among the memorable non-villain roles he portrayed were in Walang Matigas na Tinapay sa Mainit na Kape, where his brother Romy and Dindo Arroyo played the main villains of the film, and Ang Dalubhasa (without his moustache). Other non-villain appearances include: Bobocop is a comedy film where he plays the role as a police officer which starring Joey Marquez with Max Alvarado as the main villain; Eagle Squad, where he played a dedicated and good police officer alongside Robin Padilla, Jinggoy Estrada, Edu Manzano, Ricky Davao, and Monsour del Rosario with Jaime Fabregas as the main antagonist; He portrayed his role as an NBI informer in Doring Dorobo, NBI which starring Eddie Garcia with Eddie Gutierrez as the corrupt police chief superintendent; Squala, as the father of the character of his son Joko with John Regala and Dick Israel portraying the villains; Bayadra Brothers (Bayadra is a pun of Viagra), alongside Jimmy Santos and Berting Labra. He plays the role of Ramon, an office manager in the comedy film Gawa Na Ang Bala Para Sa Akin which starred Vic Sotto and Panchito Alba with Ruel Vernal as the main antagonist. Estudyante Blues, also as the father of the character of his son Joko, and Pera O Bayong as Don Juanito, starring Willie Revillame, John Estrada and Randy Santiago with Mark Gil as the right-hand man of his character and the main antagonist of that film.

He also appeared in villain roles in comedy films as the main antagonist and also in supporting/non-villain roles that stars mostly Dolphy, Redford White, Vic Sotto, Joey Marquez, Herbert Bautista, Joey De Leon, Jimmy Santos and the late actors Chiquito, Babalu, Panchito and Rene Requiestas.

He also gained popularity in the 1990s where he played title roles in two comedy films: Daddy Goon (touted as his launching film) where he was supported by Herbert Bautista, Manilyn Reynes, Eddie Gutierrez (villain) and child performer Aiza Seguerra; and The Good, the Bad and the Ugly where he shared billing with Gabby Concepcion and comedian Rene Requiestas. He also tried his hand in producing a film in 2002 via Mga Batang Lansangan... Ngayon which starred his son Joko and matinee idol Bobby Andrews.

After suffering from hypertension, which at one time left him comatose, he had to sell the family house and lot including his car.

== Personal life ==
His father was a son of Mexican American soldier who was stationed in the Philippines. His brother Romy was also an actor, as well as his wife (Nena) and children (Joko and Cheska) who are also actors. Before Diaz became an actor, he was a basketball player with the Ateneo Blue Eagles for college from 1955 to 1956 and the FEU Baby Tamaraws (forerunner of the modern-day FEU-D Baby Tamaraws) for high school.

== Death ==
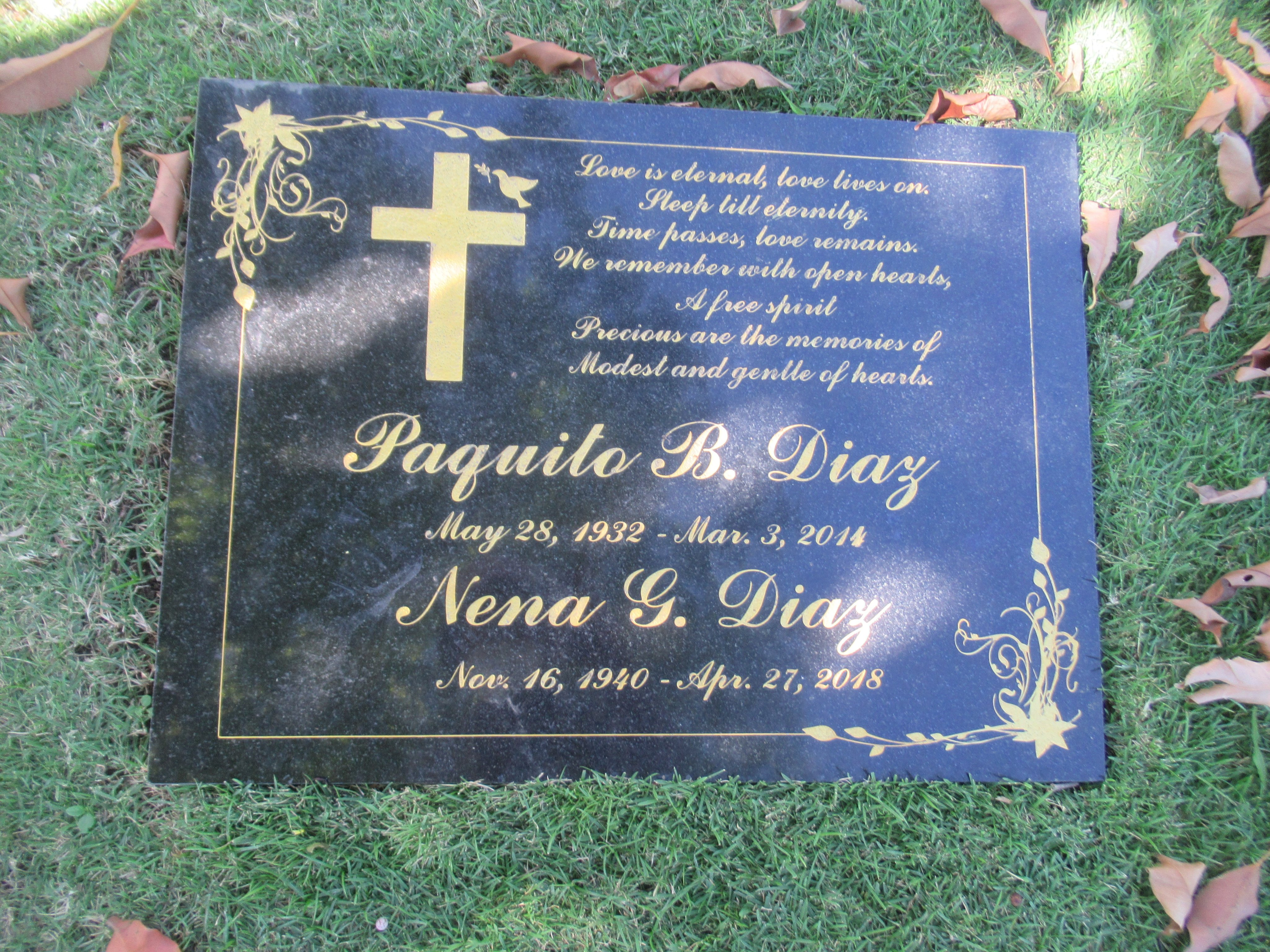
Diaz's grave in Manila Memorial Park – Sucat.

His vision was impaired for the same health reasons. In 2002, Diaz suffered a stroke that caused his health to deteriorate. He was previously been diagnosed of pneumonia and sepsis. On March 3, 2011, Diaz died due to complications of pneumonia. He was 78 years old.

== Filmography ==
=== Film ===
Year	Title	Role
2005	Enterpool: S.C.I.A., Senior Citizen in Action	
2003	Pakners	Taxi driver holdaper
2003	Tomagan	NPA leader
2002	Sabayan sa Laban	Don Ricardo
2002	Batas ng Lansangan	Chairman Lucero
2001	Mahal Kita... Kahit Sino Ka Pa!	Capt. Pato
2000	Ayos Na... Ang Kasunod	Frankie
2000	Pera O Bayong: Not da TV	Don Juanito
2000	Ang Dalubhasa	Sarge
1999	Isusumbong Kita Sa Tatay Ko	Sarge
1999	Bayadra Brothers	Steve Bayadra
1998	Bilibid or Nut!	Henry
1998	Batas Ko ang Uusig	Cuevas
1998	Sgt. Hidalgo: Alab ng Katarungan	Fabian
1998	Pagbabalik ng Probinsyano	Roque
1997	Wala Nang Iibigin Pang Iba	Abu Dhabi
1997	Pipti-Pipti: 1 por U, 2 por Me!	Zaragosa
1997	Papunta Ka Pa Lang, Pabalik Na Ako	Domeng
1997	Mauna Ka, Susunod Ako!	Gen. Grimacio
1997	Kapag Nasukol ang Asong Ulol	Mayor Gaton
1997	Cobra	Robles
1997	Ang Pinakamahabang Baba sa Balat ng Lupa	Matias
1997	Kokey	Marcial
1997	Lihim ni Madonna	Vador
1996	Papunta Ka Pa Lang, Pabalik Na Ako	Paquito "Domeng" Sanchez
1996	Sa 'Yo ang Langit, Akin ang Lupa	Panfilo
1996	Ang Misis Kong Hoodlum	Valentino
1996	Kung Marunong Kang Magdasal, Umpisahan Mo Na	Amador Cuevo
1996	Hagedorn	Solomon
1996	Kristo	Herod Antipas
1995	Rodolfo "Boy" Fuentes: Libingan ng mga Buhay	Director of Prison
1995	O-Ha! Ako Pa?!	General Motorola
1995	Kahit Butas ng Karayom, Papasukin Ko!	Martin Cayari
1995	Indecent Professor	Mr. Sonata
1995	Hindi Ka Diyos Para Santuhin	Don Gustavo
1994	Greggy en' Boogie: Sakyan Mo Na Lang, Anna!	Rigor
1994	Col. Billy Bibit, RAM	Hadji Muhran
1994	Baby Paterno: Dugong Pulis	Bernade
1994	Marami Ka Pang Kakaining Bigas	Maj. Montero
1994	Hindi Pa Tapos ang Laban	Braulio
1993	Deo Dador: Berdugo ng Munti	Hermie
1993	Dorinh Dorobo: Hagupit ng Batas	Jerry Balacundiong
1993	Manila Boy	Gonzalo
1992	Sgt. Lando Liwanag, Vengador: Batas ng Api	Mayor Labrador
1992	Daddy Goon	Sgt. Santisima
1992	Shotgun Banjo	Tata Gordon
1992	Lucio Margallo	Dante
1992	Dito sa Pitong Gatang	Chairman Nanding
1991	Rocky Plus V	Mr. Gonzalo
1991	Kung Patatawarin Ka ng Bala Ko!	Steve
1991	Buburahin Kita sa Mundo	Mannix
1991	Manong Gang	Amang
1991	Pretty Boy Hoodlum	Warden
1991	Boyong Mañalac: Hoodlum Terminator	Paeng Pusher
1991	Batas ng .45	
1991	Takas sa Impiyerno	Mayor Sebastian
1991	Leon ng Maynila: P/Col. Romeo B. Maganto, WPD-MPFF	Dyanggo
1990	Si Prinsipe Abante at ang Lihim ng Ibong Adarna	Prinsipe Atras
1990	Ganda Babae, Ganda Lalake	
1990	Bad Boy	Boggie
1990	Michael and Madonna	Stevie Wonderful
1990	David Balondo ng Tondo	Lontoc
1990	Mula Paa Hanggang Ulo	Bulik
1990	Patigasan ang Labanan	Titong
1990	Kahit Konting Pagtingin	Donato
1990	Kapag Wala Nang Batas	Amante
1989	Irosin: Pagputok ng Araw, Babaha ng Dugo	
1989	My Pretty Baby	Baldo
1989	Isang Bala, Isang Buhay	Rigor
1989	Jones Bridge Massacre (Task Force Clabio)	Boy Ramirez
1989	Gawa Na ang Bala para sa Akin	Ramon
1989	Wanted: Pamilya Banal	Castro
1989	SuperMouse and the Robo-Rats	Pendong
1989	Handa Na ang Hukay Mo, Calida	Mr. Cuenco
1989	Hindi Pahuhuli ng Buhay	Dante
1989	Sa Kuko ng Agila	Martin
1989	Ako ang Huhusga	Paquito Maraman
1989	Eagle Squad	Sgt. David
1989	Arrest: Pat. Rizal Alih – Zamboanga Massacre	
1989	Balbakwa: The Invisible Man	Pondong
1989	Sgt. Niñonuevo: The Fastest Gun Alive of WPD	Roland Castel
1989	Mars Ravelo's Bondying: The Little Big Boy	Maurice
1988	Agila ng Maynila	Castro
1988	Code Name: Black & White	Panero
1988	Gawa Na ang Bala Na Papatay sa Iyo	Alex
1988	Smith and Wesson	Tio Pablo
1988	Patron	Renato
1988	Minsan Pa, Mahalin Mo Ako!	
1988	Kamandag ng Dagat	
1988	Dugo ng Pusakal	
1988	Lorenzo Ruiz: The Saint... A Filipino	
1988	Iyo ang Batas, Akin ang Katarungan	Waldo
1988	Sheman: Mistress of the Universe	Berto
1988	Kumander Dante	
1988	One Day, Isang Araw	Baldo
1988	Buy One, Take One	Kiel
1988	Kumander Ahmed Kalansalay	Gringgo
1988	Boy Negro	Capt. Quiazon
1988	Joaquin Burdado	
1988	Bobo Cop	
1988	Lost Command	Major
1988	Akyat Bahay Gang	Abet Valdez
1988	Alyas Pusa: Ang Taong May 13 Buhay	Brando
1988	Target... Maganto	Archibald "Ka Archie"
1987	Kapag Puno Na ang Salop	Paquito Maraman
1987	Oscar Ramos: Hitman	Capt. Carreon
1987	Barbaro Santo	Victor Suarez
1987	No Retreat... No Surrender... Si Kumander	
1987	Eastern Condors	Guerrilla
1987	Jack & Jill	Boy Tusok
1987	My Bugoy Goes to Congress	Don Rodrigo "Drigo" Absalom
1987	Kapag Lumaban ang Api	Quintero
1986	Kontra Bandido	
1986	Batang Quiapo	Kits
1986	Bukas Uulan ng Bala	Don Exequiel Agravante
1986	Muslim .357	Frankie
1986	Sa Bawat Hakbang, Babaha ng Dugo	Gido
1986	Iyo ang Tondo, Kanya ang Cavite	Kiko
1986	Oras ng Kagitingan	PFC. Nestor Vargas Sr.
1985	Doctor, Doctor, We are Sick!	Mr. T
1985	Isa-isa Lang!	Bert
1984	Da Best in da West	Diablo
1984	Atsay Killer 2: Buti Nga Sa 'Yo!	Estanislao / Islaw
1984	Sendong Sungkit	Perez Buwag
1984	Bayan Ko: Kapit sa Patalim	Hugo
1984	Zigomar	Señor Miguel Alvarez
1983	E.T. Is Estong Tutong	Kits
1983	Dugong Buhay	Don Damian de Lara
1983	Atsay Killer	Estanislao / Islaw
1983	Kapag Buhay ang Inutang	Dalton
1982	My Juan en Only	Uncle Louie
1982	Big Time Berto	Baldo
1982	Bilanggo (Prisoner No. 10089)	Bogart
1981	Sambahin ang Ngalan Mo	Aristeo
1981	Ang Maestro	Quintero
1981	San Basilio	Diablo
1980	Dang-Dong	Adyong
1980	Ang Panday	Pilo
1980	Nognog	
1980	Estibador	
1980	Wander Woman si Ako	
1980	The Quick Brown Fox	
1980	Ang Agila at ang Falcon	
1980	Mission: Terrorize Panay	
1980	Puga	Mogan C. Reyes
1979	Ang Leon, Ang Tigre, at ang Alamid	Ramon Ibañez
1978	Born Fighter	Francis
1978	Ricardo Y. Feliciano's Mga Mata ni Angelita	Mario
1976	Andalucia	Gardoso
1976	Bitayin si... Baby Ama	Balbon
1975	Alupihang Dagat	Richard
1974	Sanctuario	Dionisio
1972	Ang Alamat	Romulo
1972	Santo Domingo	Tuta
1971	Women in Cages	Jorge
1971	Asedillo	Vicente
1971	Bugoy	Kikoy
1970	Pablo S. Gomez's Durando	Saldo
1970	Octopus	Adan dela Marias
1968	Abdul Tapang	Pakitong Bapon
1965	Contra Señas	Morris
1965	Ang Mananandata	Ramirez
1965	Darmo Solo	Darmo
1965	Kaaway Bilang Uno	
1960	Walang daigdig	
1958	Laban sa Lahat	
