= Panchito Alba =

Filipino film actor (1925–1995)

- Panchito in 1968
- Born: Alfonso Tagle y Discher; February 5, 1925; Paco, Manila, Philippine Islands
- Died: December 18, 1995 (aged 70); Parañaque, Philippines
- Other name: Panchito
- Occupations: Actor; Comedian
- Years active: 1942–1995
- Parent: Etang Discher (mother)
- Relatives: Babalu (nephew)
- Awards: FAMAS Best Supporting Actor; 1955 Lupang Kayumanggi

Alfonso Discher Tagle Sr., better known as Panchito Alba or simply Panchito (February 5, 1925 – December 18, 1995), was a Filipino film actor who almost exclusively appeared in comedy roles. He was known for his swarthy looks and a prominent big nose, which was often the target of ridicule, especially Dolphy calling him "baboy damo" (wild boar). Panchito frequently appeared as a comedic foil to Dolphy, with whom he was best friends in real life.

== Biography ==
Panchito was born in Paco, Manila. His mother, Etang Discher, became a prominent film actress beginning in the 1940s, often being cast in villainous roles. One of his brothers, Emil Tagle, also became a film actor. He was married with children. His aunt, Elaina Discher, was also a Filipina actress. Panchito's career in show business began in 1942 when he joined a bodabil troupe called "Travel Stage Show" which performed in various theaters in Japanese-occupied Manila. The then-14-year-old Dolphy was also a member of the troupe, thus beginning a lifelong association.

=== Film career ===
Panchito's film career began when he, along with Dolphy, were cast by Sampaguita Pictures in the Tita Duran-Pancho Magalona musical Sa Isang Sulyap Mo, Tita. It was a career that lasted until his death. In 1955, Panchito was awarded the FAMAS Best Supporting Actor award for his role in Lupang Kayumanggi. His film career thrived despite his involvement in a 1964 mauling incident in Quezon City that led to the filing of a criminal information against him and several others for frustrated murder, though the case against him would be later dismissed.

Panchito appeared with Dolphy in more than 50 films, including Kalabog en Bosyo (1959); Beatnik (1960); Si Lucio at Miguel (1962); Pepe and Pilar (1966); Facifica Falayfay (1969); Fefita Fofongay (1973); Bugoy (1979); and Bakit Kinagat ni Adan ang Mansanas ni Eba? (1989). The partnership extended to television, where the duo co-starred in an ABS-CBN variety show, Buhay Artista (1965–1972). Their act included a routine in which one would interrupt the other to offer a mangled translation of a Tagalog lyric into English or vice versa. On July 4, 1966, Dolphy and Panchito opened for The Beatles at the Rizal Memorial Sports Complex during the band's concert tour of Manila.

Apart from his partnership with Dolphy, Panchito became known as a supporting player in many other film comedies. He was frequently cast as an authority figure such as a policeman, a politician, a father-of-the-family, and memorably, as the hula skirt-clad music teacher of Jaena High School in the Joey de Leon-Rene Requiestas starrer Elvis and James (1989) and as "Paenguin" (a parody of Batman's arch-nemesis The Penguin) in the comedy-spoof Alyas Batman en Robin (1991).

In 1993, Panchito lived for a while in the United States, purportedly to seek treatment after being diagnosed with Parkinson's disease. In early 1995, his best friend Dolphy and nephew Babalu visited him in the States where he was convinced to appear in the film Home Sic Home, a comedy film shot both in the Philippines and San Francisco, U.S.A. and produced by Star Cinema. Though his movements were limited throughout the film due to his medical condition, his comeback was well received by the viewers. Soon after he decided to come back to the Philippines to resume his showbiz career. His guesting in Home Along da Riles rated high and he was cast in Dolphy and Vandolph's film Father en Son. However, while doing some scenes for the film in October 1995, he suffered a stroke that left him comatose. A video of him lying incapacitated in bed aired on Philippine television.

During his comatose period at the hospital, he was able to receive medical and financial support from his former co-stars. Aside from Dolphy, Eat Bulaga main hosts Vic Sotto and Joey de Leon also visited him. He died two months later, on December 18, 1995, at the age of 70, two days after the death of Bert Tawa Marcelo, and two months before his 71st birthday. It was also reported that Dolphy decided to include Panchito's partially-shot scenes in "Father en Son" at the final film cut as tribute to his long-time comic partner.

In 2007, Alpha Music Corporation released an album-compilation entitled The Best of Dolphy & Panchito, featuring 14 comedic duets of the comic tandem.

== Filmography ==
=== Film ===
- Son of Fung Ku (1953) ... Gordon
- Love Pinoy Style (1953)
- Fefita Fofongay (Viuda de Falayfay) (1973)
- D' Godson (1953)
- Reyna Bandida (1953)
- Menor de Edad (1954)
- Aristokrata (1954)
- Anak sa Panalangin (1954)
- Waldas (1955)
- Sa Dulo ng Landas (1955)
- Mariposa (1955)
- Lupang Kayumanggi (1956) (as Panchito Alba)
- Diyosa (1957)
- Colegiala (1957)
- Tawag ng Tanghalan (1958)
- Silveria (1958)
- Pulot Gata (1958)
- Kalabog en Bosyo (1959)
- Pakiusap (1959)
- Isinumpa (1959)
- Dobol Trobol (1960)
- Beatnik (1960)
- Operatang Sampay Bakod (1961)
- Kandidatong Pulpol (1961)
- Hami-hanimun (1961)
- Tansan the Mighty (1962)
- Si Lucio at si Miguel (1962)
- Lab Na Lab Kita (1962)
- Si Adiang Waray (1962)
- Tansan vs. Tarsan (1963)
- King and Queen for a Day (1963)
- Buhay Bumbero (1968)
- Kaming Taga Ilog (1968)
- Kaming Taga Bundok (1968)
- Good Morning Titser (1968)
- Buhay Bombero (1968)
- Dakilang Tanga (1968)
- Facifica Falayfay (1969)
- Florante at Laura (1972)
- Ang Hiwaga ng Ibong Adarna (1972)
- Love Pinoy Style (1972)
- Ang Mahiwagang Daigdig ni Pedro Penduko (1973)
- Huli Huli 'Yan (1974)
- My Funny Valentine (1974) - Joaquin
- Like Father, Like Son: Kung Ano ang Puno Siya ang Bunga (1975)
- Silang Mga Mukhang Pera (1977)
- Binata ang Daddy Ko (1977)
- Bugoy (1979)
- Jack N Jill of the Third Kind (1979)
- Kuwatog (1979)
- Dancing Master (1979)
- Max & Jess (1979) ... Jess
- The Quick Brown Fox (1980)
- Darna at Ding (1980)
- Superhand (1980)
- Dolphy's Angels (1980) (as Panchito Alba) - Lieutenant Gapos
- Johnny Tanggo Rides Again... Tatanga-tanga, Dakila Naman (1982)
- Nang Umibig ang Gurang (1982)
- My Juan en Only (1982)
- Mga Alagad ng Kuwadradong Mesa (1983)
- Goodah (1984)
- Nang Maghalo ang Balat sa Tinalupan (1984)
- Sekreta Ini (1984)
- Charot (1984)
- I Won, I Won (Ang S'werte Nga Naman) (1985) - Procapio
- Praybet Depektib Akademi (1985)
- Ano Ka Hilo? (1985)
- Isang Platitong Mani (1985) - Nanding
- Goatbuster (1985)
- Momooo (1985)
- The Crazy Professor (1985)
- Isang Kumot, Tatlong Unan (1986) - Ponso
- No Return, No Exchange (1986)
- Kalabog en Bosyo Strike Again (1986) - Bosyo
- Panchito Alba (1987)
- My Bugoy Goes to Congress (1987)
- Mga Anak ni Facifica Falayfay (1987)
- Binibining Tsuperman (1987)
- Jack & Jill (1987)
- Ready!.. Aim!.. Fire!.. (1987)
- Puto (1987) - Teacher/Coach
- Haw Haw De Karabaw (1988) - Turo/Al Capone
- Bobo Cop (1988)
- Enteng the Dragon (1988)
- Sheman: Mistress of the Universe (1988) - Tio Paeng
- Jack and Jill sa Amerika (1988)
- Smith & Wesson (1988) - Major Mayumi
- Bakit Kinagat ni Adan ang Mansanas ni Eba? (1988) - Tiago
- Starzan: Shouting Star of the Jungle (1989) - McDoogan
- Si Malakas at si Maganda (1989) - Ka Ponso
- Mars Ravelo's Bondying: The Little Big Boy (1989)
- Balbakwa: The Invisible Man (1989)
- Da Best in Da West (1989) - Inkong Gaspar
- Long Ranger & Tonton (Shooting Stars of the West) (1989) - General Alfonso Gutierrez
- Bote, Dyaryo, Garapa (1989)
- Starzan 2: The Coming of Star Son (1989)
- Aso't Pusa (1989)
- Elvis and James: The Living Legends! (Buhay Pa... Mukhang Alamat Na!) (1989)
- Pulis, Pulis sa Ilalim ng Tulay (1989) - Nato
- SuperMouse and the Robo-Rats (1989)
- Gawa Na ang Bala para sa Akin (1989)
- Romeo Loves Juliet (But Their Families Hate Each Other) (1989)
- My Darling Domestic (Greyt Eskeyp) (1989)
- Starzan III: The Jungle Triangle (1989)
- Hotdog (1990)
- Twist: Ako si Ikaw, Ikaw si Ako (1990) - Ka Limot
- Small, Medium, Large (1990) - Ma El
- Crocodile Jones: The Son of Indiana Dundee (1990)
- Ganda Babae, Ganda Lalake (1990)
- Og Must Be Crazy (1990) - Temyong
- Bagwis (1990)
- Samson & Goliath (1990)
- Espadang Patpat (1990)
- Goosebuster (1991)
- Barbi for President: First Lady Na Rin! (1991)
- Alyas Batman en Robin (1991) - Tiyo Paeng/Tiyo Paenguin
- Rocky Plus V (1991)
- Ali in Wonderland (1992)
- Sam & Miguel (Your Basura, No Problema) (1992) (as Panchito Alba) - Tomas
- Home Sic Home (1995)
- Father en Son (1995, posthumously released)

=== Television ===
- Buhay Artista (1964)
- Sa Kabilang Ibayo (1965)
- Iyan ang Misis Ko (1970)
- Bahay-Bahayan (1972)
- Barok-an Subdivision (1977)

== Notes ==
He has an extended family in Texas, Washington, and California.

He was married with Anita Martin, Aunt of Babalu and he has 3 Children, (Rosalinda or Baby, Alfonso Jr or Junior and Noralei)
