= Gawa Na ang Bala para sa Akin =

1989 comedy film starring Vic Sotto

- Directed by: Efren M. Jarlego
- Written by: Tony Cruz
- Starring: Vic Sotto; Monica Herrera; Panchito; Nova Villa; Paquito Diaz
- Cinematography: Gener Buenaseda
- Edited by: George Jarlego
- Music by: Mon del Rosario
- Production company: Regal Film
- Distributed by: Regal Films Distribution
- Release date: October 25, 1989
- Running time: 102 minutes
- Country: Philippines
- Language: Filipino

Gawa Na ang Bala para sa Akin (lit. 'The Bullet for Me Has Already Been Made') is a 1989 Filipino comedy film directed by Efren M. Jarlego and starring Vic Sotto, Monica Herrera, Panchito, Nova Villa, Paquito Diaz, Ruel Vernal, Larry Silva, and Rene Requiestas. It is Sotto's first solo lead role in a film, as his previous film roles were as part of the comedy trio of Tito, Vic and Joey. The film's title is in reference to the 1988 action film Gawa Na ang Bala Na Papatay sa Iyo (lit. 'The Bullet That Will Kill You Has Been Made'). Produced by Regal Film, the film was released on October 25, 1989, and was a box office hit, earning ₱24 million in Metro Manila alone.

Critic Justino Dormiendo of the National Midweek gave the film a negative review, criticizing its formulaic writing, acting and disgusting humor.

== Plot ==
Nanding and Anton are janitors at an insurance firm. When Nanding is diagnosed with cancer and acute tuberculosis from an X-ray, he plans in desperation to end his life quickly by hiring an assassin to kill him. However, Nanding realizes that his X-ray plates have apparently been mixed up, and so he now has to contend with the hitman who is out to shoot him dead.

== Cast ==
- Vic Sotto as Nanding Malusugin
- Monica Herrera as Vivian
- Panchito as Anton
- Nova Villa as Lita
- Paquito Diaz as Ramon
- Ruel Vernal as syndicate member
- Larry Silva as Boy Kokok
- Rene Requiestas as Rene
- Noel Ong as referee
- Harvey Vizcarra as little brother
- Ritchie Gallego as Ricky
- Vangie Labalan as land lord
- Ai-Ai de las Alas as Miss Sy Go Row
- Beverly Salviejo as office mate
- Minie Aguilar
- Renato del Prado as Capt. Puten
- Ernie Ortega as syndicate member
- Jake (Joaquin) Fajardo as drinker
- Bing Angeles as Uncle Sam
- Romy Romulo as gay
- Jessie Lee as Mr. Sy Go Row
- Aida Pedido as mother
- Dante Castro
- Joe Hardy as drinker
- Fred Capulong as drinker
- Cris Aguilar as wrestler
- Big Boy Gomez as wrestler
- Danny Labra as syndicate member
- Ernie David as syndicate member
- Perry de Guzman as syndicate member
- Bebeng Amora as syndicate member
- Canton Salazar as syndicate member
- Nannie Union as syndicate member
- Roboto as wrestler
- Pong Pong as drunk man

== Release ==
The film was released in theaters in late October 1989.

=== Box office ===
The film was a box office success, earning ₱24 million in Metro Manila alone, and approximately tying with Starzan: Shouting Star of the Jungle as the highest-grossing comedy film in the region at the time.

=== Critical response ===
Justino Dormiendo, writing for the National Midweek, gave the film a negative review for its formulaic writing and "revolting" humor. He was highly critical of the film's low-brow approach to comedy, stating that "Twice in the film I cringed in my seat, cursing the producers and their ilk for their wanton display of vulgarity and crassness." Dormiendo also criticized the actors as "an abominable lot", but singled out actress Nova Villa for her "occasionally funny antics."

=== Home media ===
On April 8, 2020, Regal Entertainment made the film available for streaming free of charge on YouTube for a limited time before restricting access, and later made it available once again by mid-June 2021.
