= Vangie Labalan =

Filipino actress and comedian (1943–2026)

- Born: Maria Cristina Bonghanoy; January 20, 1943; Bago, Negros Occidental, Japanese-occupied Philippines
- Died: February 12, 2026 (aged 83); Australia
- Occupations: Actress; comedian; acting coach; voice actress; dubbing supervisor
- Years active: 1964–2026
- Spouse: Noli Labalan
- Children: 4

Maria Cristina "Vangie" Bonghanoy-Labalan (January 20, 1943 – February 12, 2026) was a Filipino actress, comedian, acting coach and voice actress.

== Background ==
Vangie Labalan was born as Maria Cristina Bonghanoy in Bago, Negros Occidental on January 20, 1943. She was the widow of Noli, a former casino dealer, and had four children and nine grandchildren.

Labalan owned a company called "Synch Masters", which specialized in dubbing Mexican telenovelas and anime shows in Filipino.

== Career ==
Labalan began her career in radio in 1962 in Bacolod before going on to television and film, and she was in the entertainment industry for half a century.

She was discovered by the filmmaker, stage and television director, actor, and screenwriter, Ishmael Bernal when he noticed the natural actress in her while supervising the dubbing of the film Aliw starred by Lorna Tolentino in 1979. Labalan rose to prominence for her breakout performance as Aling Saling, Nora Aunor's mother in Himala (1982), in which she co-starred alongside Nora Aunor, Veronica Palileo, and Spanky Manikan, among others. Labalan also starred in several Philippine feature films including Alyas Baby Tsina (1984), Miguelito: Ang Batang Rebelde (1985), and Curacha: Ang Babaeng Walang Pahinga (1998).

== Death ==
Labalan died in Australia on February 12, 2026, after being admitted to a hospital. She was 83.

== Filmography ==
=== Film ===
Year	Title	Role	Source
1980	Girlfriend		
1980	Manila by Night	Cora	
1982	Himala	Aling Saling	
1983	Of the Flesh	Rosing	
1984	Bukas Luluhod ang Mga Tala	Pining	
1984	Alyas Baby Tsina	Sidra	
1984	Misteryo sa Tuwa	Marcela	
1985	Miguelito: Ang Batang Rebelde	Vendor	
1985	Pati Ba Pintig ng Puso?	Bien's mother	
1985	Till We Meet Again	Tinay	
1986	Gabi Na, Kumander	Tiya Nena	
1987	Wanted Bata-Batuta		
1987	Ready!.. Aim!.. Fire!..		
1987	Black Magic		
1987	Walang Karugtong ang Nakaraan	Didang	
1988	Rosa Mistica	Yaya	
1988	Parrot Unit	Salud Akomplis	
1988	Nakausap Ko ang Birhen	Anching	
1988	Wake Up Little Susie	Producer	
1988	Bobo Cop	Maring	
1988	Kumander Bawang: Kalaban ng Mga Aswang	Ek-Ek	
1988	Nagbabagang Luha	Wife of taxi driver	
1988	Sheman: Mistress of the Universe		
1988	Babaing Hampaslupa	Carling's mother	
1988	Smith & Wesson		
1989	Starzan: Shouting Star of the Jungle		
1989	Mars Ravelo's Bondying: The Little Big Boy	Pining	
1989	Magic to Love	Delilah	
1989	Barbi: Maid in the Philippines		
1989	Long Ranger and TonTon: Shooting Stars of the West	Lovely Nest	
1989	M&M, the Incredible Twins	Sion	
1989	Aso't Pusa	Toyang	
1989	Elvis and James: The Living Legends! (Buhay Pa... Mukhang Alamat Na!)	Aling Susy	
1989	Pulis, Pulis sa Ilalim ng Tulay	Selma	
1989	Bilangin ang Bituin sa Langit	Matilde	
1989	Estudyante Blues	Iluminda	
1989	Gawa Na ang Bala para sa Akin	Land lord	
1989	Student Body		
1989	Regal Shocker: The Movie		
1990	Dyesebel	Toyang	
1990	Kahit Konting Pagtingin		
1990	Ganda Babae, Ganda Lalake		
1990	Kabayo Kids	Ma - El	
1990	Michael and Madonna		
1990	Pido Dida: Sabay Tayo	Nanay Batchoy	
1990	Bakit Kay Tagal ng Sandali?	Yaya	
1990	Shake, Rattle & Roll II	Nanay Aswang	
1991	Pido Dida 2: Kasal Na	Nanay Batchoy	
1991	Hihintayin Kita sa Langit	Adora	
1991	Boyong Mañalac: Hoodlum Terminator	Mama San	
1991	Uubusin Ko ang Lahi Mo	Ariston's wife	
1991	Makiusap Ka sa Diyos	Baliw	
1991	Cheeta-eh, Ganda Lalake?	Kampon ng Reyna ng Kadiliman	
1991	Shake, Rattle & Roll III	Mama Eba	
1992	The Good, the Bad and the Ugly		
1992	Shake, Rattle & Roll IV	Yaya Gi	
1993	Ikaw Lang	Senyang	
1993	Hulihin: Probinsiyanong Mandurukot		
1993	Pido Dida 3: May Kambal Na	Nanay Batchoy	
1993	Bulag, Pipi, at Bingi		
1994	Multo in the City	Riorita	
1994	Maalaala Mo Kaya: The Movie	Aling Tessie	
1994	Tunay Na Magkaibigan, Walang Iwanan... Peksman		
1995	Basta't Kasama Kita	Carinderia owner	
1995	P're Hanggang sa Huli	Patring	
1995	Ang Tange Kong Pag-ibig	Tiya Pasing	
1995	Run Barbi Run	Flora	
1996	Ano Ba Talaga Kuya?	Annabelle	
1996	Bayarang Puso	Cora Pineda	
1996	Madrasta	Manang	
1996	May Nagmamahal Sa'yo	Sister Lourdes	
1996	Dead Sure	Aling Choleng	
1997	Lab en Kisses	Inday	
1997	Paano ang Puso Ko?	Lola Simang	
1997	Super Ranger Kids	Isyang	
1997	Enteng en Mokong	Caring	
1998	Sana Pag-ibig Na	Tinang	
1998	Curacha: Ang Babaeng Walang Pahinga	Hermaphrodite's Mother	
2000	'Di Ko Kayang Tanggapin	Chariwoman Cherry	
2000	Eto Na Naman Ako	Aling Maring	
2000	Biyaheng Langit	Auntie	
2001	Kapitan Ambo: Outside de Kulambo	Bellystar	
2003	Pinay Pie	Ursula	
2004	Lastikman: Unang Banat	Delia	
2006	Blue Moon	Carmencita	
2006	Pamahiin	Tita Amelia	
2007	Ouija	Francisco	
2008	My Monster Mom	Luming	
2008	My Only Ü	Tita Lolit	
2011	Wedding Tayo, Wedding Hindi	Loleng Garbanzos	
2012	Mariposa: Sa Hawla ng Fabi	Sol	
2013	Seduction	Viring	
2013	It Takes a Man and a Woman	Manang Chacha	
2013	Four Sisters and a Wedding	Manang	
2013	Otso		
2014	Sigaw sa Hatinggabi		
2015	Redbook		
2015	Haunted Mansion	Manang Selya	
2016	Everything About Her	Ellen	
2016	Ang Manananggal sa Unit 23B	Lola Trinidad Virginia Otto	
2017	Foolish Love	Madam	
2017	Balatkayo	Madam	
2017	Bes and the Beshies	Manghuhula	
2018	The Hopeful Romantics	Madam Sugar Twinkle	
2019	Isa Pa with Feelings	Lita	
2020	Hindi Tayo Pwede	Manghuhula	
2021	General Admission		
2021	Ikaw	Manang Carmen	
2023	Mallari	older Maria Kapac	

=== Television ===
Year	Title	Role	Source
1989–1995	Anna Luna	Tarsing	
1992–2013	Maalaala Mo Kaya	Various roles	
1996	Mukha ng Buhay	Bebang's mom	
2000–2001	Marinella	Inday	
2000	!Oka Tokat		
2001	Sa Dulo ng Walang Hanggan	Belita	
2002	Kay Tagal Kang Hinintay	Yaya Mischka	
2002–2006	OK Fine, 'To Ang Gusto Nyo!		
2003	Sana'y Wala Nang Wakas		
2003	Ang Iibigin ay Ikaw	Yolanda Lujan	
2004	Lagot Ka, Isusumbong Kita	Tusha	
2004	Marinara	Pinang	
2004	Twin Hearts		
2005	Encantadia	Rosita "Rosing"	
2006	Bakekang	Mameng	
2006	Fantastikids	Bebang	
2007	Kung Mahawi Man ang Ulap	Yaya Rosa	
2008	Tasya Fantasya	Kelay	
2008	Ako si Kim Samsoon	Brenda Timbol	
2009	Darna	Impong Denang	
2010	Your Song Presents: Love Me, Love You	Marikit	
2010	Diva	Glo	
2010	JejeMom	Madam	
2010	Claudine		
2010–2011	Imortal	Tabitha Matute	
2011	Spooky Nights		
2012	Alice Bungisngis and Her Wonder Walis	Belinda Kasimsiman	
2012	Kasalanan Bang Ibigin Ka?	Clara	
2012	Cielo de Angelina	Rosario	
2012	5 Girls and a Dad	Venus	
2013	Juan dela Cruz	Pacing	
2013	Cassandra: Warrior Angel	Aling Belay	
2013–2014	Magkano Ba ang Pag-ibig?	Sonia Aguirre	
2013–2014	Wansapanataym	Various roles	
2013–2019	Wagas	Various roles	
2014	Ikaw Lamang	Conchita	
2015	Luv U	Lola Ramos	
2015	Baker King	Vising	
2015–2016	Karelasyon	Various roles	
2015–2016	Ningning	Aling Candy	
2016	We Will Survive	Maria Judith "Judy" Rubio	
2016	Conan, My Beautician	Mrs. Paz	
2016	You're My Home	Oda Tilay	
2017	Tadhana	Norma	
2017	My Dear Heart	Conching	
2017–2018	Pusong Ligaw	Gabriella "Lolay" Policarpio	
2018	Inday Will Always Love You	Kapitana Tessa	
2018	Maynila	Sandra	
2018–2019	Dear Uge	Various roles	
2019	Magpakailanman	Lola Delia	
2019	Ipaglaban Mo!	Lola Raquel	
2020	Make It with You	Lola Iluminada "Iling" Dimagiba	
2021–2022	FPJ's Ang Probinsyano	Lucia Dueñas	
2024	May For Ever	Amanda	
2025	Lolong: Bayani ng Bayan	Tonette	
2025	FPJ's Batang Quiapo	Carmen	(Labalan's finale & last television series, appearance before her death)

=== As a dubbing supervisor ===
Movies
Year	Title	Production company
1991	Maging Sino Ka Man	Viva Films

== Awards and nominations ==
Year	Work	Award	Category	Result	Source
2016	Ang Manananggal sa Unit 23B	QCinema International Film Festival 2016	Best Supporting Actress	Won	
