= Kahit Konting Pagtingin =

1990 romantic action film starring Fernando Poe Jr., Sharon Cuneta

- Official movie poster
- Directed by: Pablo P. Santiago
- Screenplay by: Amado Lacuesta Jr.; Jose Bartolome
- Story by: Amado Lacuesta Jr.; Fred Navarro
- Produced by: William C. Leary
- Starring: Fernando Poe Jr.; Sharon Cuneta
- Cinematography: Ver Reyes
- Edited by: Augusto Salvador
- Music by: Jimmy Fabregas
- Production companies: Viva Films; FPJ Productions
- Distributed by: Viva Films
- Release date: February 14, 1990
- Running time: 120 minutes
- Country: Philippines
- Language: Filipino

Kahit Konting Pagtingin (lit. 'Even a Little Glance') is a 1990 romantic action film directed by Pablo Santiago. The film stars Fernando Poe Jr. and Sharon Cuneta, alongside Ricky Davao, Bing Loyzaga, Paquito Diaz, Dencio Padilla, Subas Herrero, Lucita Soriano, Bert Olivar, and Romeo Rivera. The plot revolves around Georgia, a spoiled heiress, and her humble bodyguard Delfin.

Produced by Viva Films, the film was released on February 14, 1990, and was a box office hit, surpassing a box office record held by Starzan: Shouting Star of the Jungle. A sequel, Minsan Pa: Kahit Konting Pagtingin Part 2, was released in 1995. The film is also Poe's first with Viva Films outside of a brief cameo in She-Man: Mistress of the Universe (1988).

== Synopsis ==
Georgia, a headstrong heiress is seeking independence from her overprotective father who hires Delfin to be her bodyguard. Georgia's arrogant behavior gets on Delfin nerves immediately, and their first few initial encounters has been tumultuous. Despite the differences in background and personalities, their relationship has evolved into mutual respect and affection where Delfin continues to stay at Georgia's side and vows to protect her from various threats and dangers.

== Cast ==
- Fernando Poe Jr. as Delfin Maniego
- Sharon Cuneta as Georgia Zaragosa
- Ricky Davao as Charlie Torres, Georgia's suitor
- Bing Loyzaga as Cynthia, Georgia's secretary and friend
- Paquito Diaz as Donato
- Dencio Padilla as Basilio
- Subas Herrero as Don Dionisio Zaragosa
- Bert Olivar as Damian Zaragosa
- Romeo Rivera as Mr. Torres
- Lucita Soriano as Teresa
- Naty Santiago as Nana Juling
- Ernie Zarate as Atty. Alvarez
- Manjo del Mundo as Cesar
- Ali Sotto as Cora
- Ronald Jayme as Jeffrey

== Production ==
=== Filming ===
During filming, Fernando Poe Jr. regularly brought Sharon Cuneta food on set. Though Kahit Konting Pagtingin is a love story, no kissing scene was shot between Poe and Cuneta.

== Release ==
Even before its release, Kahit Konting Pagtingin was already expected to become an enormous success at the box office with its pairing of two highly popular stars in Philippine show business. It was released on February 14, 1990, in 82 theaters within Metro Manila, a record number at the time.

=== Box office ===
The film was highly successful at the box office. It earned ₱5 million on its first day, a Wednesday, and earned more than ₱6 million the next Sunday. It eventually surpassed a box office record set by Starzan: Shouting Star of the Jungle in 1989.

== Home media ==
Kahit Konting Pagtingin was released on DVD by Viva Video in 2002. Later, it was paired with its sequel Minsan Pa for Viva Video's "Da King" collector's edition DVD release.

== Sequel ==
A sequel, Minsan Pa: Kahit Konting Pagtingin Part 2, was released in 1995 and was directed by Eddie Rodriguez.

=== Accolades ===
Award-giving body	Category	Recipient	Result
9th FAP Awards	Best Supporting Actor	Dencio Padilla	Won
