= Iyo ang Tondo, Kanya ang Cavite =

1986 action film by Pablo Santiago

- Theatrical poster
- Directed by: Pablo Santiago
- Written by: Agustin B. de la Cruz (story and screenplay); Diego Cagahastian (title); Antonio Pascua (additional sequences)
- Produced by: Benedicto S. Hernandez; Agustin B. de la Cruz
- Starring: Fernando Poe Jr.; Ramon Revilla
- Cinematography: Ver P. Reyes
- Edited by: Augusto Salvador
- Music by: George Canseco
- Production company: BSH Films
- Release date: January 30, 1986
- Running time: 112 minutes
- Country: Philippines
- Language: Filipino

Iyo ang Tondo, Kanya ang Cavite (lit. 'Tondo Is Yours, Cavite Is His') is a 1986 Filipino action film directed by Pablo Santiago from a story and screenplay written by Agustin B. de la Cruz, with the title suggested by Diego Cagahastian and additional sequences written by Antonio Pascua. The film stars Fernando Poe Jr. and Ramon Revilla.

Produced by BSH Films, the film was theatrically released on January 30, 1986. It earned less at the box office than what its producers anticipated, with industry observers assuming that GMA Network's television broadcasts of past Poe films had likely drawn audiences away from watching Poe's newest titles in cinemas.

== Plot ==
Crisanto is a valiant man from the streets of Tondo beloved by its people for his acts of vigilantism and his Robin Hood-like generosity to its poor. Bador, on the other hand, is an influential man in Cavite's underworld whose tight grip is recognized in the entire province. Crisanto and Bador are good friends dating back to their incarceration at the New Bilibid Prison.

Their friendship will be put to the ultimate test as the Kingpin of Tondo is pitted against his staunch ally, the Don of the Cavite gangland, by a cabal of men from both Tondo and Cavite eager to oust both from their respective thrones. Now, the best of friends become the worst of enemies as Tondo collides with Cavite.

== Cast and characters ==
- Fernando Poe Jr. as Crisanto
- Ramon Revilla Sr. as Bador
- Anita Linda as Desta
- Liza Lorena as Luz
- Paquito Diaz as Kiko
- Berting Labra as Berto
- Ruel Vernal as David
- Lito Anzures as Andres
- Jaime Fabregas as Felix
- Max Alvarado as Ponzo
- Romy Diaz as Romy
- Larry Silva as Celso
- Susan Katigbak as Celia
- Tony Carreon as Señor Monterrazo
- Edwin O'Hara as Mr. Hernandez
- Victor Bravo
- Lito Garcia
- Christopher Paloma as Cris
- Butch Bautista as Botong
- Vic Diaz as Kanor
- Nello Nayo as Kardo
- Tony Gonzales as Atty. Angeles
- Renato del Prado as Gildo
- King Gutierrez as Golem
- Carmen Enriquez as Carmen
- Willie Chavez
- Carlos de Leon as Donato
- Rosanna Jover
- Ernie David as Siano
- Angelo Ventura as Cabo
- Jess Vargas
- Michelle Cancio
- Ben Tisoy

== Release ==
The BSH Films-produced film was released on January 30, 1986

=== Box office ===
The film earned less at the box office than its producers expected. Observers of the film business suggested that this was likely due to GMA Network having begun broadcasting Poe's past films on the television program FPJ sa GMA, which may have drawn audiences away from watching Poe's new films in cinemas. Another reason given was Poe's politics: Poe supported the reelection of President Ferdinand Marcos in the 1986 snap elections, which may have affected his popularity among his viewers.

== Aborted remake ==
Off the heels of the success Manila Kingpin: The Asiong Salonga Story, its lead star ER Ejercito expressed a desire to do a remake of Iyo ang Tondo, Kanya ang Cavite. The film would have starred Ejercito as Crisanto and his El Presidente co-star Cesar Montano as Bador. The said remake would have been shot after El Presidente wrapped up. However, the remake never came to fruition as Ejercito instead moved on to other projects, Boy Golden: Shoot to Kill, and Muslim Magnum .357: To Serve and Protect, respectively. The latter film was a remake of the 1986 film starring Fernando Poe Jr.
