= Boy Alano =

Filipino actor (1941–2022)

- Alano in 2018
- Born: Hernando Alano; March 20, 1941; Commonwealth of the Philippines
- Died: July 23, 2022 (aged 81); Manila, Philippines
- Occupation: Actor
- Years active: 1951–2022

Hernando Alano (March 20, 1941 – July 23, 2022), better known as Boy Alano, was a Filipino actor. He won the award for Best Child Actor at the 5th Asian Filmfest.

== Early life ==
He was the third child of Consuelo Sotto and Exequiel Alano. He went to Moises Salvador Elementary School and finished high school at National University. He did a year in Far Eastern University and took Commerce. His first dream was to become a businessman.

== Career ==
He first appeared in the 1951 film Roberta and became popular in Kiko. He made about 200 films and television shows since 1950. He was also on the radio show Ricky Romantiko on DZXL every Sunday. His best friends were Victor Wood and Renato del Prado.

== Death ==
Boy Alano died on July 23, 2022, in Sampaloc, Manila at the age of 81.

== Filmography ==
=== Film ===
==== As an actor ====
- 1951 – Roberta
- 1951 – Anghel ng Pag-ibig
- 1952 – Rebecca
- 1953 – El Indio
- 1953 – Munting Koronel
- 1953 – Anak ng Espada
- 1953 – Maldita
- 1953 – Kiko – Kiko
- 1954 – Musikong Bumbong
- 1955 – Kuripot
- 1956 – Prince Charming
- 1957 – Batang Bangkusay
- 1958 – The Day of the Trumpet – Best Child Actor, 5th Asian Filmfest
- 1960 – Beatnik
- 1960 – Sa Hardin ng Diyos
- 1964 – Paratroop Squadron
- 1964 – Sa Bilis Walang Kaparis
- 1964 – Kumander Judo
- 1964 – Mga Kanyon ng Corregidor
- 1965 – Mga Espada ng Rubitanya
- 1966 – James Batman
- 1967 – Ang Pangarap Ko'y Ikaw
- 1969 – Yeye Generation!
- 1969 – Bitter Sweet
- 1969 – Petrang Paminta
- 1970 – Munting Santa
- 1970 – Sixteen
- 1970 – Tomboy Nora
- 1970 – Dingdong
- 1988 – Kambal Tuko – Boy Unano
- 1988 – Bobo Cop
- 1988 – Kumander Anting-Anting
- 1992 – Okay Ka, Fairy Ko!: Part 2 – Bogart
- 1993 – Dagul – Fernandez
- 1994 – Col. Billy Bibit, RAM – Informer
- 1995 – Ang Syota Kong Balikbayan – Tino / Tina
- 1996 – Ikaw ang Mahal Ko
- 1999 – Bayadra Brothers
- 2000 – Juan & Ted: Wanted – Sgt. Langku
- 2001 – Hindi Sisiw ang Kalaban Mo – Egay
- 2002 – Lapu-Lapu – Lagum
- 2003 – A.B. Normal College: Todo Na 'Yan! Kulang Pa 'Yun! – Dominic's father
- 2012 – Of All the Things
- 2014 – Gangster Lolo
- 2015 – Manila's Finest – Lookout

==== As writer ====
- 1991 – Cheeta-eh, Ganda Lalake?

=== Television ===
- 1998 – Back to Iskul Bukol
- 2002–2008 – Magpakailanman
- 2005 – Walang Kukurap
- 2005 – Mulawin
- 2005 – Sugo
- 2005 – Baywalk
- 2006 – Noel
- 2007 – Dalawang Tisoy
- 2007 – Mga Kuwento ni Lola Basyang
- 2007–2009 – Ful Haus
- 2008 – Codename: Asero
- 2008 – Joaquin Bordado
- 2009 – May Bukas Pa
- 2009 – Show Me Da Manny
- 2009 – Totoy Bato
- 2010 – Maynila
- 2010 – Kaya ng Powers
- 2010 – JejeMom
- 2010 – Pilyang Kerubin
- 2010 – Pidol's Wonderland
- 2010 – Untold Stories mula sa Face to Face
- 2011 – I Heart You, Pare!
