= Roy Alvarez =

Filipino actor, director and scriptwriter for film, television and theater

- Born: Leandro Delantar Alvarez; March 23, 1950; Pagbilao, Quezon, Philippines
- Died: February 11, 2014 (aged 63); Quezon City, Philippines
- Occupations: Actor, director
- Years active: 1971–2014
- Agent: GMA Artist Center
- Spouse: Nieves Campa-Alvarez
- Children: Miren Alvarez

Leandro Delantar Alvarez (March 23, 1950 – February 11, 2014), better known by his screen name Roy Alvarez, was a Filipino actor, director and screenwriter for film, television, and theater in the Philippines.

== Biography ==
Leandro Delantar Alvarez was born on March 23, 1950, in Pagbilao, Quezon, Philippines. He finished his Bachelor of Science in commerce at the University of Santo Tomas in Manila, Philippines. He lived for some time in the United States.

He was also a lecturer and speaker on Consciousness Development, Inner and Outer Ecology, Healing Mother Earth and Zero Waste Management.

In March 1989, he signed an eight-picture deal with Viva Films, and was set to star in the film Imortal alongside Vilma Santos and Christopher de Leon; however, he eventually dropped out of the project.

He was the former president of ET CE TERRA, a Filipino UFO enthusiasts group.

== Personal life ==
He was married to Nieves Campa and they have a daughter, Miren Alvarez who is married to Paolo Fabregas, a son of his friend and fellow actor Jaime Fabregas.

== Death ==
Alvarez died on February 11, 2014, due to cardiac arrest, at age 63. His remains is at Garden of Divine Word at Christ The King Semenary in Quezon City. He is survived by his wife, Nieves Campa-Alvarez, and daughter, Miren Alvarez-Fabregas.

== Filmography ==
=== Film ===
Year	Title	Role
1971	Reaching the Top	
1972	The Hot Box	Leyo
1972	The Big Bird Cage	Revolutionary (uncredited)
1983	Super Gee	
1983	Sasabayan Kita sa Impiyerno	Boyet
1984	Working Girls	Roy
1985	Ma'am May We Go Out?	Roy
1985	Alexandra	
1986	Yesterday, Today and Tomorrow	Lawyer
1987	Remember Me, Mama	
1987	Tigershark	Tony
1987	Kapag Puno Na ang Salop	Dante
1988	Rosa Mistica	Attorney
1988	Petrang Kabayo at ang Pilyang Kuting	Drago
1988	Super Inday and the Golden Bibe	
1988	A Dangerous Life	Col. 'Tiger' Tecson
1988	Code Name: Black & White	
1989	Arrest: Pat. Rizal Alih – Zamboanga Massacre	Maj. Refe
1989	Kung Kasalanan Man	Raullo Ferrer
1989	Punglo Bawat Hakbang	
1991	Anak ng Cabron: Ikalawang Ugat	Manuel
1991	McBain	Head Federate
1992	Lumaban Ka, Itay!	
1992	Sa Aking Puso: The Marcos 'Bong' Manalang Story	
1992	Cordora: Lulutang Ka sa Sarili Mong Dugo	Benjamin Cabrera / Ka Bernie
1992	Hanggang May Buhay	
1993	Ms. Dolora X	
1993	Pugoy – Hostage: Davao	Lt. Col. Franco Calida
1993	Tikboy Tikas at Mga Khroaks Boys	
1994	Mayor Cesar Climaco	
1995	Sabik sa Halik	
1995	Judge Max Asuncion: Hukom Bitay	
1996	Hangga't May Hininga	Billy Boy
1996	Rubberman	Yoyoy
1996	Mahal Kita, Alam Mo Ba?	Mayor
1996	Tong-its	
1997	Rizal in Dapitan	Capt. Carnicero
1997	Shake, Rattle & Roll VI	Ricardo (segment "Ang Buwan")
1997	Epimaco Velasco: NBI	Nardong Putik
1997	Pusakal	
1997	Puerto Princesa	
1997	Matrikula	Bogart
1997	Sabi Mo Mahal Mo Ako, Wala ng Bawian	Tin. Reyes
1997	Kahit Hindi Turuan ang Puso	
1997	Frats	
1998	Ben Delubyo	Col. Zacarias
1998	Curacha ang Babaeng Walang Pahinga	Ship Captain
1998	Birador	Capt. Moreno
1998	Cariño Brutal	
1999	Tatapatan Ko ang Lakas Mo	
1999	Type Kita... Walang Kokontra	Alex Portugal
1999	Tik Tak Toys: My Kolokotoys	Mr. Bolado
1999	The Kite	
1999	Kapag Kumulo ang Dugo	Parica
1999	Asin at Paminta	Pineda
2000	Alipin ng Tukso	Senor Alfonso
2000	Spirit Warriors	Steve
2001	Oops, Teka Lang... Diskarte ko 'to!	Ka Benito
2001	Oras Na para Lumaban	
2001	Masikip Na ang Mundo Mo, Labrador	
2001	Huli sa Akto	
2001	Naked Nights	
2001	ID	Mayor
2002	Burles King: Daw O	Don Henrico
2002	Kaulayaw	
2002	Diskarte	Veloso
2002	Tampisaw	Mauricio
2002	Spirit Warriors: The Shortcut	Ponce's stepfather
2003	Message Sent	
2004	Kuya	Vincent's Dad
2006	The Mourning Girls	Atty. San Jose
2010	Buenavista (Ang Kasaysayan ng Lucena)	
2010	The Night Infinite	
2010	Father Jejemon	
2013	Kung Fu Divas	Charlotte's Adoptive Father

=== Television ===
Year	Title	Role	Notes
1989	Balintataw		Episode: "Sakristan"
1997	Bayani	Martin Delgado	
2002	Sana Ay Ikaw Na Nga	Cameo role	
2004	Krystala	Bacchus Salvador	
2005	Now and Forever: Ganti	Gerardo	
2009	Parekoy	Benjamin	
2009	Precious Hearts Romances Presents Bud Brothers	Umberto Urbano	
2010–2011	Juanita Banana	Don Arnulfo Buenaventura	
2011	Guns and Roses	Arnulfo	
2011–2012	Amaya	Awi	
2012	Alice Bungisngis and Her Wonder Walis	Don Zaldy Fernandez	
2012	Maalaala Mo Kaya	Butch	Episode: "Relo"
2012–2013	Pahiram ng Sandali	Homer Alcaraz	
2013	Unforgettable	Salvador 'Badong' Leoncio	
2013	Magpakailanman	Efren Contemplacion	Episode: "Life After the Death of Flor Contemplacion"
2013	My Husband's Lover	Manuel Soriano	
2013–2014	Villa Quintana	Don Manolo Quintana	Alvarez's last TV appearance. Due to his death, he was replaced by Al Tantay to continue the role.
