= Ma'am May We Go Out? =

- Directed by: Mike Relon Makiling
- Screenplay by: Mike Relon Makiling
- Story by: Mike Relon Makiling; Tony Gloria
- Produced by: Ramon Salvador
- Starring: Tito Sotto; Vic Sotto; Joey de Leon
- Cinematography: Ben Lobo
- Edited by: Ike Jarlego Jr.
- Music by: Vicente Sotto III
- Production company: Viva Films
- Distributed by: Viva Films
- Release date: June 12, 1985
- Running time: 103 minutes
- Country: Philippines
- Languages: Filipino; English

Ma'am May We Go Out? is a 1985 Filipino comedy film co-written and directed by Mike Relon Makiling. Starring the comedic trio Tito Sotto, Vic Sotto, and Joey de Leon, the story follows three brothers who have decided to finish high school to claim the inheritance from their United States-based grandfather, and if not, the lawyer will claim it.

== Plot ==
Soriano brothers Dennis, Chip (real name Chipipoy), and Jeff are bums who do odd jobs to earn a living, including driving a jeepney. Their lives take a different turn after meeting Atty. Aga Agaton, who told them that they are long-lost heirs of a US-based millionaire. Per the millionaire's will, the brothers would claim his inheritance as long as they finish high school, or else the lawyer will take it all.

The brothers enroll at the Rajah Putih High School, where their age turns them into the butt of their classmates' jokes. The brothers eventually befriend a group of students after saving them from thugs. They also seek help from Einstein, the class's resident genius, in order to get away with the most difficult subjects.

Trouble starts when the Soriano brothers become involved in different mishaps happening in the school (including inviting prostitutes to a general parent-teachers assembly, almost burning the school during the foundation day, and getting Chip a prom date who turned out to be a striptease dancer), resulting in multiple confrontations with the school principal, with each confrontation causing her to weaken. However, despite compromises that eventually lead to more shenanigans & their great ideas for programs that earned the school more money, the brothers are set to graduate high school and get the inheritance.

However, Agaton wants the money for himself, plotting with his bodyguard to bomb the Soriano brothers' graduation. At the ceremonies, the brothers were accorded special honors by the school despite having caused much havoc. As a sign of gratitude, Dennis, Chip and Jeff share the special award with Agaton. The lawyer hesitantly accepts the trophy, but the driver warns him too late that the bomb was inside the trophy. Agaton and the driver die, while the Soriano brothers and everyone else on stage are sprawled all over the place.

== Cast ==
Main cast

- Tito Sotto as Dennis Soriano
- Vic Sotto as Chipipoy "Chip" Soriano
- Joey de Leon as Jeff Soriano

Supporting cast

- JC Bonnin as Jake
- Herbert Bautista as John
- Ramon Christopher as Monching
- Niño Muhlach as Angelo Einstein
- Cecille Iñigo
- Jobelle Salvador
- Cheska Iñigo
- Carmi Martin as Didi
- Roy Alvarez as Mr. Dela Pena
- Joonee Gamboa as Assistant Principal De Sahagon
- Rustica Carpio as Principal Quirina Landicho
- Rodolfo Boy Garcia as Atty. Aga Agaton
- Grace Gonzales as Steele
- Becky Misa as Miss Lakambini Fundador
