= Bobo Cop =

1988 Filipino action comedy film

- Directed by: Tony Y. Reyes
- Written by: Woodrow Serafin
- Starring: Joey Marquez; Alice Dixson; Matet; Kristina Paner; Cris Villanueva; Jenny Lyn; Panchito; Palito; Cachupoy
- Cinematography: Oscar Querijero
- Edited by: Efren Jarlego
- Music by: Boy Alcaide
- Production company: Regal Films
- Release date: May 12, 1988
- Running time: 108 minutes
- Country: Philippines
- Language: Filipino

Bobo Cop (lit. 'Stupid Cop') is a 1988 Filipino action comedy film directed by Tony Y. Reyes and starring Joey Marquez as the titular cop, alongside Alice Dixson, Matet, Kristina Paner, Cris Villanueva, Atoy Co, Amy Perez, Willie Revillame, Panchito and Cachupoy. The film's title is in reference to the 1987 American film RoboCop. Produced by Regal Films, Bobo Cop was released on May 12, 1988.

Critic Lav Diaz gave the film a mildly positive review, commending it for being hilarious despite its imitation of numerous screen works such as Police Academy and The Six Million Dollar Man while criticizing the third act for being boring.

== Cast ==
- Joey Marquez as Renato Dalmacio
- Alice Dixson as Louise
- Matet
- Kristina Paner
- Cris Villanueva
- Atoy Co
- Amy Perez
- Willie Revillame
- Panchito as Renato's godfather
- Palito
- Cachupoy
- Berting Labra
- Max Alvarado as Don Maximo
- Paquito Diaz
- Balot
- Jaime Castillo
- Marilyn Villamayor
- Carmina Villaruel
- Jenny Lyn
- Robert Ortega
- Smokey Manaloto
- Marissa Delgado
- Boy Alano
- Tony Carreon as Doctor Gracia
- Rudy Meyer
- Don Pepot as Badong
- Vangie Labalan as Maring
- Joaquin Fajardo
- Larry Silva
- Metring David
- Perry de Guzman

== Release ==
Bobo Cop was released on May 12, 1988.

=== Critical response ===
Lav Diaz, writing for the Manila Standard, gave Bobo Cop a mildly positive review. He stated that though the film tried to cram as many imitations as it can into the story, from Police Academy to The Six Million Dollar Man to Jimmy Wang Yu, it was still able to garner effective hilarity. Diaz criticized, however, the film for becoming boring when it became a parody of RoboCop in the third act.
