= Romeo Rivera =

Filipino actor (born 1939)

Romeo Rivera (born September 27, 1946) is a Filipino actor. He appeared in more than 95 movies and television shows.

== Career ==
In 1963, Sampaguita Pictures introduced him with a bunch of young teenage stars which they called the Sampaguita-Vera-Perez All Stars: Rosemarie Sonora, Blanca Gomez, Gina Pareño, Lito Legaspi, Dindo Fernando, and Pepito Rodriguez, among others. The movies they made were Mga Batang Artista (1964), Mga Batang Bakasyonista (1964), Mga Batang Iskwater (1964), and Mga Batang Turista (1965), among others.

He received a nomination for FAMAS Award Best Supporting Actor 1966 in Paalam sa Kahapon.

He played as Mr. Crisford in 1995 family-drama film Sarah... Ang Munting Prinsesa starring Camille Prats as well as Pontius Pilate in Kristo in 1996.

== Filmography ==
=== Film ===
Year	Title	Role(s)
1963	Ang Class Reunion	
1964	Mga Batang Bakasyonista	
1964	Mga Batang Milyonaryo	
1964	Mga Batang Artista	
1964	Fighting Warays sa Ilokos	
1964	Bathing Beauties	
1964	Umibig Ay Di Biro	
1965	Babaing Hudas	
1965	Mga Batang Turista	
1965	Mga Espada ng Rubitanya	
1966	Komrad X	
1966	Huling-huli ni Kumpare si Kumare	
1966	Maghapong Walang Araw	
1966	Sexy Yata 'Yan	
1966	Nais Ko Pang Mabuhay	
1967	Let's Dance the Soul	
1967	Sino ang Dapat Sisihin?	
1967	To Love Again	
1967	Pogi	
1967	Ang Pangarap Ko'y Ikaw	
1968	Psycho Maniac	
1968	Pitong Krus ng Isang Ina	
1969	Kalinga	
1970	Bulaklak at Paru-paro	
1972	Takbo, Vilma, Dali!	
1972	Hating-gabi Na, Vilma!	
1973	7 Infantes de Lara	
1974	Ransom!	
1974	Tama Na Erap!	
1974	Savage Sisters	Raul
1976	Makahiya at Talahib	
1978	Magkaaway	
1978	Nakawin Natin ang Bawa't Sandali	
1978	Hatulan si Dodong Diamond	
1979	Coed	
1979	Biyak Na Manyika	
1979	Stepsisters	
1979	Kadete	
1980	Kalibre .45	
1981	Deadly Brothers	
1984	Bagets	Arnel's father
1984	Working Girls	Tony
1984	Bukas Luluhod ang Mga Tala	Rebecca's lawyer
1984	Experience	
1985	Kailan Sasabihing Mahal Kita?	Ben Ortiz
1986	Yesterday, Today & Tomorrow	Ike
1986	Paalam... Bukas ang Kasal Ko	Father of Dingdong
1986	Nakagapos Na Puso	Toti Delfino
1987	Maharlika	
1987	Cabarlo	
1987	Asawa Ko, Huwag Mong Agawin	Julio Ledesma
1987	Target: Sparrow Unit	
1988	Ibulong Mo sa Diyos	Lawyer #2
1988	Rosa Mistica	Mike's father
1988	Sana Mahalin Mo Ako	Uncle Tony
1988	Ang Supremo	
1988	Sandakot Na Bala	Renato
1988	Patron	
1988	Lord, Bakit Ako Pa?	
1989	3 Mukha ng Pag-ibig	Atty. Ortiz
1989	Impaktita	Guido
1989	Huwag Kang Hahalik sa Diablo	
1989	Isang Bala, Isang Buhay	Dolores' father
1990	Kahit Konting Pagtingin	Mr. Torres
1990	Barumbado	Ignacio
1990	Hindi Laruan ang Puso	
1990	Pido Dida: Sabay Tayo	
1991	Anak ni Baby Ama	
1991	Regal Shocker (The Movie)	
1991	Batas ng .45	Fr. Morgan/Jess Serrano
1991	Kaputol ng Isang Awit	
1991	Contreras Gang	Mario's father
1992	Hiram Na Mukha	Miguel
1992	Shotgun Banjo	Dante
1993	Ronquillo: Tubong Cavite, Laking Tondo	
1994	Kapantay Ay Langit	Frank's father
1994	Bratpack (Mga Pambayad Atraso)	Gen Fernandez
1994	Sana Dalawa ang Puso Ko	Isabel's father
1995	Eskapo	Popoy
1995	Sarah... Ang Munting Prinsesa	Mr. Anthony Crisford
1996	Dyesebel	Nilo
1996	Anak, Pagsubok Lamang ng Diyos	Kathryn's father
1996	Sa Aking mga Kamay	Romeo Rivera
1996	Kristo	Poncio Pilato
1997	Frame Up	Don Benito Pareno
1999	Wansapanataym	Don Victor Enrique
2011	Pak! Pak! My Dr. Kwak!	Don Ramon

- Warat (1999)
- Bobby Barbers: Parak (1997)
- Maalaala Mo Kaya - "Dancing Shoes I" (1994)
- Kapantay Ay Langit (1994)
- Maging Sino Ka Man (1991)
- Paano Kung Wala Ka Na? (1987)
- Nakagapos Na Puso (1986)
- Macho Gigolo (1986)
- Kailan Sasabihing Mahal Kita? (1985)
- Pati Ba Pintig ng Puso? (1985)
- Ulo ng Gapo (1985)
- Sa Hirap at Ginhawa (1984)
- Baby Tsina (1984)
- Erap Is My Guy (1973)

=== Television ===
Year	Title	Role(s)	Notes
1994	Ipaglaban Mo!		Episode: "Lason sa Dugo"
1999	Wansapanataym		
2001	Maalaala Mo Kaya		Episode: "Lobo"
2002-2003	Kay Tagal Kang Hinintay	Don Feudor Ventaspejo	
2005	Magpakailanman		Episode: "The Manny & Pie Calayan Story"
