= Larry Silva =

Filipino actor comedian, athlete and politician (1937-2004)

31st Vice Mayor of Manila
- In office April 28, 1998 – June 30, 1998; Officer In Charge
- Mayor: Lito Atienza
- Preceded by: Ernesto Nieva
- Succeeded by: Danilo Lacuna

Member of the Manila City Council from the 3rd district
- In office June 30, 1995 – April 25, 2004

Personal details
- Born: Hilarion Cuenca Silva; October 21, 1937 Manila, Philippine Commonwealth
- Died: April 25, 2004 (aged 66) Manila, Philippines
- Party: Liberal (2001–2004)
- Other political affiliations: Lakas (1995–1998)
- Spouse: Monina "Pipay" Silva
- Children: 5
- Occupation: Actor; boxer; politician
- Nickname: Pipoy

Hilarion "Larry" Cuenca Silva (October 21, 1937 – April 25, 2004), also known as Pipoy, was a Filipino comedian, film actor, television personality, boxer and politician, who served as 30th Vice Mayor of Manila from March 28 to June 30, 1998. He started as an amateur boxer before being discovered in the show business and appearing in numerous films. Beyond acting and being a prominent comedian, he also ventured into politics, wherein he was elected as a member of the Manila City Council multiple times from 1995 to 2004 and briefly as acting vice mayor in 1998.

== Political career ==
He was elected as a councilor of the 3rd District of Manila in 1995. In 1998, he briefly became vice mayor under Lito Atienza, who ascended to the post of mayor after Alfredo Lim resigned to run for president. That same year, he was reelected as councilor and again in 2001, serving until his death in 2004.

== Filmography ==
=== Film ===
- Mga Daliring Ginto (1964)
- Geron Busabos: Ang Batang Quiapo (1964)
- Baril Na Ginto (1964)
- Salonga Brothers (1965)
- Sa Kamay ng Mga Kilabot (1965)
- Black Jack (1965)
- Joe Nazareno: Ang Taxi Driver (1965)
- Soliman Brothers (1966)
- Pistolero (1966)
- Wanted: Johnny L (1966)
- Master Fighter (1967)
- Ang Limbas at ang Lawin (1967)
- Sibad (1967)
- Room for Rent (1968)
- Killer Patrol (1968)
- Kapwa Walang Pinapanginoon (1968)
- Dugay Na sa Maynila (Tonto Ka Pa) (1968)
- The Samurai Fighters (1969)
- The Magnificent Ifugao (1969)
- Samurai Master (1969)
- Pambihirang Tatlo (1969)
- Mighty Rock (1969)
- 3 Patapon (1969)
- San Diego (1970)
- Dimasalang (1970)
- Mandawe (1971)
- Bella Bandida (1971)
- Putol na Kampilan (1972)
- Nardong Putik (1972)
- Isla de Toro (1972)
- Anak ng Aswang (1973)
- Ibilanggo Si... Cavite Boy (1974)
- Huli Huli Yan! (1974) - Tenant
- Valentin Labrador (1977)
- Herkulas (1977)
- Gameng (1977)
- Roberta (1979)
- Siga (1980)
- Viva Santiago (1981)
- Get My Son Dead or Alive (1982)
- Over My Dead Body (1983)
- Digmaan, Sa Pagitan ng Langit at Lupa (1983)
- Ang Padrino - Hilarion
- Sloane (1984) - Motel clerk
- Sarge (1984)
- Daddy's Little Darlings (1984)
- Nardong Putik (Kilabot ng Cavite) Version II (1984)
- The Perils of Gwendoline in the Land of the Yik Yak (1984)
- Working Boys (1985) - Bruno Juramentado
- Nagalit ang Patay sa Haba ng Lamay (1985)
- Mama Said Papa Said I Love You (1985)
- Miguel Cordero (1985)
- Bomba Arienda (1985)
- Tatakas Ako... Ubos Kayo! (1986)
- Iyo ang Tondo, Kanya ang Cavite (1986) - Celso
- Isang Kumot Tatlong Unan (1986) - Badong
- Alamat ng Ninja Kuno (1986)
- Di Bale Na Lang (1987)
- Alla ricerca dell'impero sepolto (1987)
- Ready!.. Aim!.. Fire!.. (1987) - Lauro Longhair
- Leroy Leroy Sinta (1988)
- Kambal Tuko (1988) - Boy Kinis
- Bobo Cop (1988)
- Love Letters ("Eternally" segment; 1988) - Samson
- One Day, Isang Araw (1988)
- Me & Ninja Liit (1988) - Uto-San
- Starzan: Shouting Star of the Jungle (1989)
- Killer vs. Ninjas (1989)
- Uzi Brothers 9mm (1989)
- Gawa Na ang Bala para sa Akin (1989)
- Oras-Oras Araw-Araw (1989)
- My Pretty Baby (1990)
- Hulihin si Nardong Toothpick (1990)
- Twist: Ako si Ikaw, Ikaw si Ako (1990) - Henchman
- Pitong Gamol (1991)
- Okay Ka, Fairy Ko!: The Movie (1991) - Pipoy
- Sam en Miguel: Your Basura, No Problema (1992) - Billy Gin
- Okay Ka, Fairy Ko: Part 2 (1992) - Pipoy
- Dito sa Pitong Gatang (1992)
- Pempe ni Sara at Pen (1992) - Popoy
- Junior Police (1993)
- Ang Kuya Kong Siga (1993) - Bart
- Tunay Na Magkaibigan, Walang Iwanan...Peksman (1994)
- Once Upon a Time in Manila (1994) - Chairman Shepherd
- Hindi Pa Tapos ang Labada, Darling (1994) - Popoy
- Isang Kahig, Tatlong Tuka (1995)
- Sa Iyo ang Langit, sa Akin ang Lupa (1996)
- Enteng and the Shaolin Kid (1996) - Gorio
- Ang Tange Kong Pag-Ibig (1996) - Tyopips
- Lab en Kisses (1996) - Popoy
- Tataynic (1998)
- Sige, Subukan Mo (1998)
- Totoy Guwapo (1999)
- Sgt. Isaias Marcos: Bawat Hakbang Panganib (2000)

=== Television ===
Year	Title	Role
1987–1995	Okay Ka, Fairy Ko!	Pipoy
2014	Tunay na Buhay	Posthumously featured

== Death ==
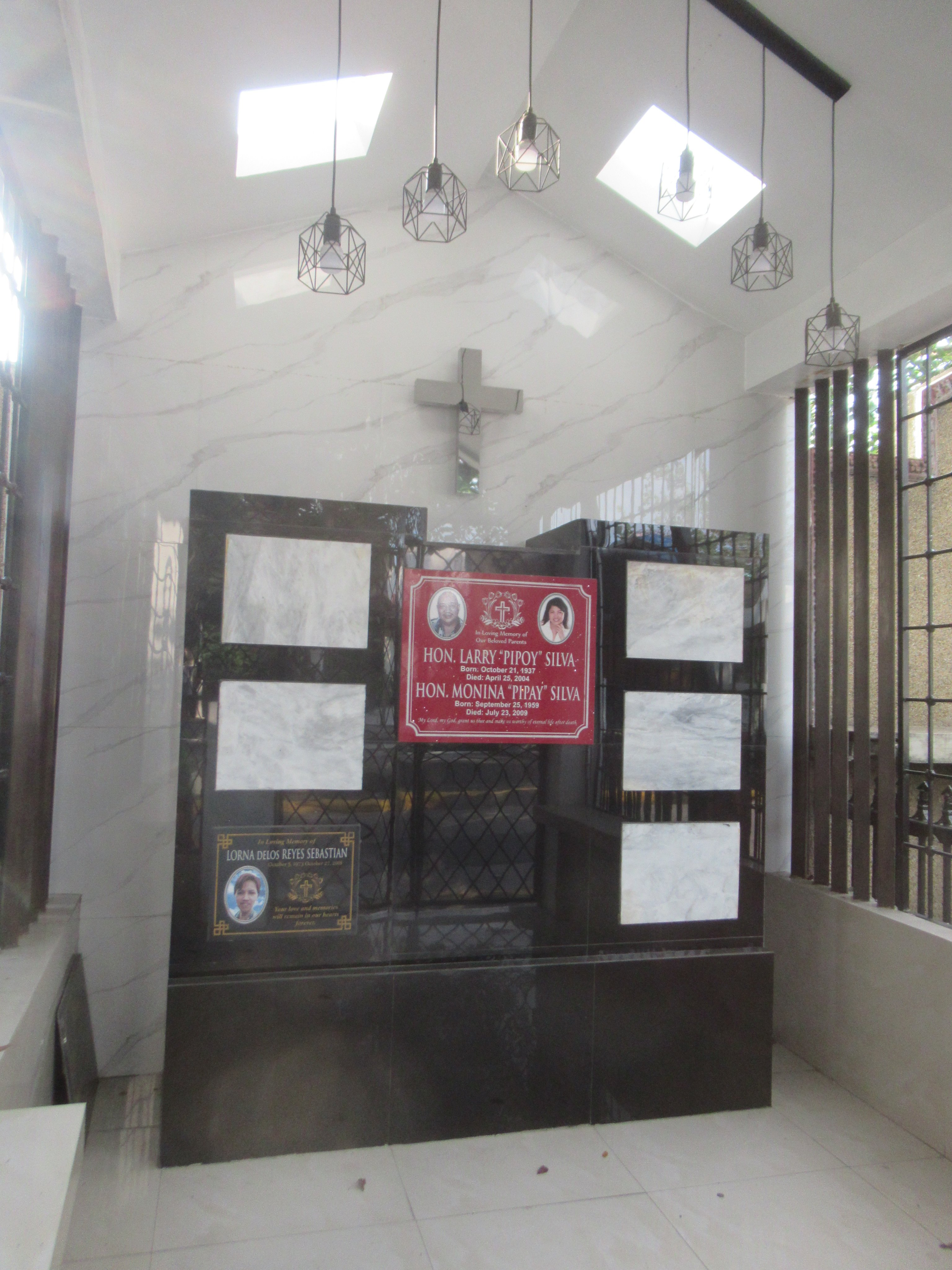
Silva's grave at the Silva mausoleum in Manila North Cemetery

Silva died on Sunday, April 25, 2004 due to a lingering kidney ailment (kidney failure). He was 66. His remains were cremated four days later and his ashes were entombed at Manila North Cemetery. His tomb is restored in 2024.
