= My Bugoy Goes to Congress =

1987 Filipino film

- Official movie poster
- Directed by: Jett C. Espiritu
- Written by: Ben Feleo
- Produced by: Richard "Ricky" Valdes; Alfredo Baluyot Jr.
- Starring: Dolphy; Nora Aunor; Panchito; Rachel Anne Wolfe; Paquito Diaz; Dencio Padilla; Eric Quizon
- Cinematography: Amado de Guzman; Arnold Alvaro
- Edited by: Efren Jarlego
- Music by: Dominic Salustiano
- Production companies: RVQ Productions; Shining Star Productions
- Release date: May 7, 1987
- Country: Philippines
- Language: Filipino

My Bugoy Goes to Congress is a 1987 Filipino political comedy film directed by Jett C. Espiritu and starring Dolphy, Nora Aunor and Dolphy's son Eric Quizon. It is the sequel to the 1979 film Bugoy. Produced by RVQ Productions and Shining Star Productions, the film was released on May 7, 1987. Critic Justino Dormiendo of the Manila Standard gave the film a negative review for its formulaic and ineffective comedy, and observed that "Contrary to our expectations, Bugoy [...] does not go to congress."

== Synopsis ==
Bugoy, an ordinary man with a big heart known for his community service runs for Congress. During the campaign, his candid, unfiltered rants against his corrupt political opponent goes viral leading to his unanticipated win and humorous misadventures in the Congress.

== Cast ==
Main cast

- Dolphy as Ramboteo "Bugoy" Sumalangit
- Nora Aunor as Cathy

Supporting cast

- Eric Quizon as Ricky Salonga
- Panchito
- Rachel Anne Wolfe as Anna Absalom
- Paquito Diaz as Don Drigo Absalom
- Dencio Padilla as Basilio
- Babalu as Baker Arroyo
- Don Pepot
- Tiya Pusit
- Subas Herrero
- Zeny Zabala
- Teroy de Guzman
- Georgie Quizon
- Caselyn Francisco
- Max Vera
- Rey Q. Bayona Jr.
- Frankie Abao as Himself
- Cathy Santillan as Herself

== Critical response ==
Justino Dormiendo, writing for the Manila Standard, gave the film a negative review, criticizing it as thoroughly formulaic and unfunny, while noting that "Contrary to our expectations, Bugoy [...] does not go to congress." He stated that "This is an idiotic non-movie cashing in on the audience appeal of the latest electoral contest, a subject that should be more effectively tackled in satire or parody, which this film is doubly ignorant of."
