= Wake Up Little Susie (film) =

1988 Filipino comedy film

- Directed by: Luciano B. Carlos
- Written by: Jose Javier Reyes
- Produced by: Lily Y. Monteverde
- Starring: Tito Sotto; Vic Sotto; Joey de Leon; Aiza Seguerra; Lotlot de Leon; Ramon Christopher; Kristina Paner; Cris Villanueva; Manilyn Reynes; Janno Gibbs
- Cinematography: Gener Buenaseda
- Edited by: Efren Jarlego
- Music by: Vehnee Saturno
- Production company: Regal Films
- Release date: April 27, 1988
- Country: Philippines
- Languages: Filipino; English

Wake Up Little Susie is a 1988 Filipino comedy film directed by Luciano B. Carlos and starring the comedy trio of Tito Sotto, Vic Sotto and Joey de Leon alongside child actress Ice Seguerra as the titular character. The film also stars Lotlot de Leon, Ramon Christopher, Kristina Paner, Cris Villanueva, Manilyn Reynes and Janno Gibbs. Produced by Regal Films, it was released on April 27, 1988.

Critic Lav Diaz gave the film a mixed review, criticizing its unoriginality and the unnecessary addition of musical scenes involving love teams while commending the hilarity of Tito, Vic and Joey.

== Plot ==
Inmates David, Napoleon, and Alexander are in jail due to a frameup, but a scuffle during a morning exercise routine gives them the opportunity to escape. As they run from the authorities, they meet Susie Seguerra, a child who is also on the run from men who want to kidnap her. The trio then try to take care of Susie while they evade capture as fugitives.

== Cast ==
- Tito Sotto as David
- Vic Sotto as Napoleon
- Joey de Leon as Alexander
- Ice Seguerra as Susie Seguerra
- Lotlot de Leon as Luglug de Leon
- Ramon Christopher as Mon Dragon
- Kristina Paner as Tina Turbo
- Cris Villanueva as Cris Cross
- Manilyn Reynes as Maniquin
- Janno Gibbs as Janno Bravo
- Fred Montilla as Don Octavio
- Janice Jurado as Noemi
- Cynthia Patag as Lorraine
- Rez Cortez as Hermogenes Macatayog
- Minnie Aguilar as Patricia
- Mely Tagasa as Roda
- Lou Veloso as Atty. Perfecto Holmado
- Jordan Castillo as Cassius
- Khryss Adalia as director
- Vangie Labalan as producer
- Bert Mansueto as producer's PRO
- Jimmy Tongco as Macatastas
- Cesar Esteban as Bruno
- Perry de Guzman as Ador
- Ryan Redillas as Butchy Boy
- Lucy Quinto as Aling Petra
- Josie Galvez as Aling Ineng
- Eva Ramos as Aling Puding
- Ike Lozada as manager 1
- Big Boy Gomez as a zumo wrestler
- Chito Alcid as manager 2
- Rusty Santos as Samaniego
- Joaquin Fajardo as a zumo wrestler
- Eric Agaton as Tato

== Production ==
Ice Seguerra (then named Aiza) received his first film role in Wake Up Little Susie after winning the Little Miss Philippines competition in 1987.

== Release ==
Wake Up Little Susie was released on April 27, 1988.

Regal Films made the film available for streaming on YouTube without charge on May 6, 2020.

=== Critical response ===
Lav Diaz, writing for the Manila Standard, gave the film a mixed review. He largely criticized the film for copying its story from the then-to-be-released American film Three Men and a Baby, stating that "this is a very big insult to us because Pinoys already have the ability to make something original." Diaz also disparaged the scenes of singing and dancing given to the film's love teams (de Leon-Christopher, Paner-Villanueva and Reynes-Gibbs), which he found unnecessary and inserted only "to make their fans scream." He admitted, however, that Jose Javier Reyes's script and the comedic performances of Tito Sotto, Vic Sotto and Joey de Leon managed to recover the film from its faults.
