= Eskapo =

1995 action thriller film by Chito S. Roño

- Official movie poster
- Directed by: Chito S. Roño
- Written by: Roy C. Iglesias; Jose F. Lacaba
- Produced by: Simon C. Ongpin
- Starring: Christopher de Leon; Richard Gomez
- Cinematography: Ely Cruz
- Edited by: Jess Navarro
- Music by: Jaime Fabregas
- Production company: Star Cinema
- Distributed by: Star Cinema
- Release date: January 25, 1995
- Running time: 114 minutes
- Country: Philippines
- Languages: Filipino; English

Eskapo (English: Escape) is a 1995 Filipino action thriller film directed by Chito S. Roño and written by Roy Iglesias and Jose Lacaba. Starring Christopher de Leon and Richard Gomez, who respectively play as Eugenio "Geny" Lopez Jr. and Sergio "Serge" Osmeña, the story follows their detention during the early stages of Martial Law and then, their eventual escape in 1977. It also features a supporting cast, including Dina Bonnevie, Ricky Davao, Mark Anthony Fernandez, Eric Fructuoso, and Romeo Rivera.

Produced and distributed by Star Cinema, the film was theatrically released on January 25, 1995.

== Plot ==
In 1972, after martial law was imposed in the Philippines through Proclamation No. 1081, Geny Lopez and Serge Osmeña are arrested separately, based on false accusations of attempts to assassinate President Ferdinand Marcos. While in jail, they met with other political prisoners who were released one by one as days went by. Geny's father decides to give up his entire business empire to the cronies of Marcos to ensure his son's release. But he was double-crossed after the deal was consummated. This leads to both Lopez and Osmena initiating a hunger strike to let everyone know their plight. Several more political prisoners were released except for them. Eventually, Lopez and Osmeña would hatch a plan together to escape from Fort Bonifacio and discreetly travel abroad, out of range from Marcos' dictatorial grasp.

== Cast ==
Main cast

- Christopher de Leon as Eugenio "Geny" Lopez Jr.
- Richard Gomez as Sergio "Serge" Osmeña III
- Dina Bonnevie as Conchita "Chita" La'O Lopez
- Ricky Davao as Atty. Jake Almeda-Lopez

Supporting cast

- Armando Goyena as Eugenio Lopez Sr.
- Mark Anthony Fernandez as Eugenio "Gabby" Lopez III
- Eric Fructuoso as Raffy Lopez
- Farrah Florer as Marissa Lopez
- Paula Peralejo as Gina Lopez
- T.J. Cruz as Ernie Lopez
- Camille Prats as Roberta Lopez
- Carlo Prats as Ramón Lopez
- Maila Gumila as Minnie Osmeña-Cabarrus
- Amado Cortez as Sergio Osmeña Jr.
- Teresa Loyzaga as Imelda Marcos
- Romeo Rivera as Popoy
- Miguel Faustmann as Steve Psinakis
- Augusto Victa as Primo
- Ramon Recto as Jimmy Jimenea
- Pocholo Montes as Evaristo Zulueta
- Ray Ventura as The General
- Joel Torre as Jorge Cabardo
- Mark Gil as Jesús "Jess" Cabarrus Jr.
- Nestor Escano as Lorenzo Tañada
- Nonie Buencamino as Ferdinand Marcos
- Tirso Cruz III as Fernando Lopez

== Notes ==
1. The character is based on then-Leyte governor Kokoy Romualdez. According to Raul Rodrigo's book Kapitan: Geny Lopez and the Making of ABS-CBN, Romualdez was sent to the United States by the Marcos regime as an emissary to Sergio Osmeña and Don Eugenio Lopez to secure their cooperation and endorsement of the New Society in exchange for their sons' release from prison.

== Accolades ==
Award-Giving Body	Category	Recipient	Result
1996 Gawad Urian Awards
1996 Gawad Urian Awards	Best Sound (Pinakamahusay na Tunog)	Ramon Reyes	Won
1996 Gawad Urian Awards	Best Direction (Pinakamahusay na Direksyon)	Chito S. Roño	Nominated
1996 Gawad Urian Awards	Best Cinematography (Pinakamahusay na Sinematograpiya)	Ely Cruz	Nominated
1996 Gawad Urian Awards	Best Editing (Pinakamahusay na Editing)	Jess Navarro	Nominated
