= Cheeta-eh, Ganda Lalake? =

- Directed by: Tony Cruz; Arthur Nicdao
- Written by: Tony Cruz; Tony Fajardo; Rene Requiestas; Boy Alano
- Screenplay by: Arthur Nicdao
- Story by: Arthur Nicdao
- Produced by: Lily Y. Monteverde; Tony Fajardo
- Starring: Rene Requiestas; Cristina Gonzales; Paquito Diaz; Chichay
- Cinematography: Gener Buenaseda
- Edited by: Eduardo Jarlego
- Music by: Boy Alcaide
- Production company: Regal Films
- Distributed by: Regal Entertainment
- Release date: 1991 (Philippines)
- Running time: 102 minutes
- Country: Philippines
- Language: Filipino

Cheeta-eh, Ganda Lalake? (lit. 'Cheeta-eh, Beautiful Man?') is a 1991 fantasy comedy film written by Arthur Nicdao and co-directed by Nicdao and Tony Cruz. The film stars Rene Requiestas, Cristina Gonzales, Paquito Diaz, and Chichay, and shares Cheeta-eh's, Starzan's sidekick, point of view.

== Plot ==
A war between Amazons and their rivals left so many casualties on both sides, Cheetae (Rene Requiestas) rescues a mortally wounded Amazon. The woman gives him a stone before dying. He tries to swallow it, transforming him into Cheetae Ganda Lalake in Amazon costume. As the Amazon's rivals try to find the last of their enemies, they fight Cheetae but in vain.

== Cast ==
- Rene Requiestas as Narding / Cheeta-eh
- Cristina Gonzales as Xuzixa
- Paquito Diaz as Nardong Toothpick
- Chichay as Lola
- Noel 'Ungga' Ayala as Dinggoy / Ungga
- Toni Aracama as Suzette
- Sylvia Sanchez as Sheila
- Lola Rodriguez as Reyna ng Kadiliman
- Joaquin Fajardo as Buaya
- Vangie Labalan as Kampon ng Reyna ng Kadiliman
- Gigi Posadas as Aling Gigi
- Evelyn Vargas as Estrella
