= Rosa Mistica =

1988 fantasy anthology film starring Snooky Serna

- Directed by: Emmanuel H. Borlaza
- Screenplay by: Orlando B. Nadres
- Story by: Pablo S. Gomez
- Starring: Snooky Serna; Gabby Concepcion; Aga Muhlach; Eric Quizon; Charito Solis; Liza Lorena; Chanda Romero; Orestes Ojeda; Kristine Garcia; Rachel Anne Wolfe; Noel Colet
- Cinematography: Eduardo Jacinto
- Edited by: George Jarlego
- Music by: Vehnee Saturno
- Production company: Regal Films
- Release date: March 3, 1988
- Running time: 117 minutes
- Country: Philippines
- Language: Filipino

Rosa Mistica is a 1988 Filipino romantic fantasy anthology film directed by Emmanuel H. Borlaza and written by Orlando B. Nadres. Based on the Pilipino Klasiks comic by Pablo S. Gomez, the film is composed of three segments, with Snooky Serna starring in the lead role in each segment. Produced by Regal Films, it was released on March 3, 1988, and was a commercial success.

Critic Luciano E. Soriano of the Manila Standard gave the film a positive review, and considered the final segment to be the film's highlight.

== Plot ==
=== Mga Puting Rosas ni Rosalie ===
Rosalie Leynes, a young woman from a rich family, is engaged to Mike, but on their wedding day, Rosalie dies and goes to heaven. She implores a woman who looks similar to the Virgin Mary to return her to Earth in order to settle some unfinished business, which the woman grants. Three years after her death, Rosalie returns to find Mike about to poison her sickly mother Donya Natalia in order to inherit her wealth and support his parents.

=== Mga Pulang Rosas ni Rosanna ===
Rosanna Cabuyao is the poor daughter of the caretaker of the Villafuerte family's mausoleum. One day, the body of Ramil, the last remaining member of the Villafuertes, is brought to a cemetery. Rosanna had a crush on Ramil before his apparent death, and is compelled to open his coffin, only to find Ramil alive and well. Ramil reveals to her that he is a vampire, and was once the love of Rosanna in a past life during the Spanish colonial period, only to be cursed by Lucila. Eventually, Ramil convinces Rosanna's family to come live in his mansion.

=== Mga Dilaw Na Rosas ni Rosario ===
Rosario Karakol is an unattractive but loyal maid at the house of Nyora Diday. While cleaning the attic, Rosario stumbles upon a magic mirror that has the power to make her beautiful. Upon the death of Nyora Diday, Rosario is named as her heiress, but both Donya Loleng and her daughter Trixia are unwilling to accept this fact and refuse to leave the house. Trixia also plans to keep Dio, Rosario's crush, away from her.

== Cast ==
- Mga Puting Rosas ni Rosalie
  - Snooky Serna as Rosalie Leynes
  - Aga Muhlach as Mike
  - Kristine Garcia as Greta
  - Liza Lorena as Donya Natalia
  - Marissa Delgado as Mike's mother
  - Romeo Rivera as Mike's father
  - Vangie Labalan as the maid
  - Raquel Villavicencio
  - Tony Mabesa
  - Kookoo Gonzales
- Mga Pulang Rosas ni Rosanna
  - Snooky Serna as Rosanna Cabuyao
  - Eric Quizon as Ramil Villafuerte
  - Chanda Romero as Lucila
  - Orestes Ojeda as the lawyer
  - Ernie Zarate as the caretaker
  - Noel Colet
  - Mel Martinez
  - Anton Serna
  - Cris Banal
- Mga Dilaw Na Rosas ni Rosario
  - Snooky Serna as Rosario Karakol
  - Gabby Concepcion as Dio
  - Charito Solis as Nyora Diday
  - Rachel Anne Wolfe as Trixia
  - Rosemarie Gil as Donya Loleng
  - Roy Alvarez
  - Mike Austria as Mel
  - Evelyn Vargas
  - Beverly Salviejo
  - Minnie Aguilar
  - Dinky Doo Jr.
  - Metring David
  - Mely Tagasa

== Release ==
A pictorial (photoshoot) for Rosa Mistica was held in mid-February 1988. The film was released on March 3, 1988, and was a box office success.

=== Critical response ===
Luciano E. Soriano, writing for the Manila Standard, gave Rosa Mistica a positive review, and considered its final segment "Mga Dilaw Na Rosas" to be the "most entertaining" of the three. He praised Serna's against-type comedic performance as Rosario in the said segment, stating that "she makes Rosario funny, pitiful and lovable." Soriano questioned, however, a few decisions the filmmakers took in telling the stories, such as the first segment's three-year gap between Rosalie's death and return and the casting of Aga Muhlach as the opportunistic Mike, as well as the second segment's use of vampires, which is "alien" to Filipino folklore.
