= Pido Dida: Sabay Tayo =

- Theatrical poster
- Directed by: Tony Cruz
- Screenplay by: Roger Fuentebella; Tony Cruz
- Story by: Tony Fajardo
- Produced by: Lily Monteverde; Roselle Monteverde; Tony Fajardo
- Starring: Rene Requiestas; Kris Aquino
- Cinematography: Gener Buenaseda
- Edited by: Rene Tala
- Music by: Homer Flores
- Production company: Regal Films
- Distributed by: Regal Films
- Release date: October 2, 1990
- Running time: 115 minutes
- Country: Philippines
- Languages: Filipino; English

Pido Dida: Sabay Tayo (English: "Pido Dida: Let's Do It Together") is a 1990 Filipino romantic comedy film directed by Tony Cruz starring Rene Requiestas and Kris Aquino. The title is a reference to Fido Dido, a character that was best known for advertising the soft drink brand 7Up. The film, produced and distributed by Regal Films, premiered in the Philippines on October 2, 1990, and was a box office success.

== Plot ==
Pido (Rene Requiestas) and Dida (Kris Aquino) grew up together in an orphanage believing they are siblings. Soon after a family adopts both of them, they leave the house due to abuse. They later reach a shanty town and found themselves living within the area with Nanay Bachoy (Vangie Labalan). During this time, their real families are already looking for them. The moment that their parents found them and they discover that they are not related, their feelings for each other get stronger. They are now separated from each other, however, with Pido working as a street vendor and Dida living in a mansion. Despite their differences, they still choose to love each other and they get married in the end. At one point in the film, Fido, in an attempt to follow Dida literally followed the plane that (he thought) Dida was aboard until he later fell down from the sky unharmed.

== Cast ==
=== Main cast ===
- Rene Requiestas as Pido
- Kris Aquino as Dida

=== Supporting cast ===
- Vangie Labalan as Nanay Bachoy
- Nova Villa as Akang, Mother of Pido
- Alicia Alonzo as Mother Rosa
- Ann Villegas
- Romeo Rivera
- Joseph de Cordova
- Joaquin Fajardo
- Ruben Rustia
- Berting Labra
- Nanding Fernandez
- Eric Cayetano
- Ruby Rodriguez
- Anthony Taylor
- Dexter Doria as Shirley

== Production ==
The names of the characters "Pido" and "Dida" were derived by 7 Up's cartoon character Fido Dido.

Pido Dida: Sabay Tayo was the first film of Kris Aquino, who played the character Dida. During this time, she was only 19 years old and her mother, Corazon Aquino, was then President of the Philippines. Besides her being young, her mother particularly disliked her in a comedy film. Despite her mother being against Aquino entering the entertainment business, she still pursued it, and was given an ₱2 million salary for her role in Pido Dida, an unprecedented amount for a first-time actress.

The first leading man for Aquino, Rene Requiestas, was hand-picked during the time that he was one of the top actors in the Philippines. Due to his comic timing and mannerisms, he was already breaking box-office records in the films he starred in.

== Promotion ==
One time while the film was being promoted in GMA Supershow, Aquino fell off the stage. Although the cameraman changed his focus right away towards the host of the show, German Moreno, who apologized, the fall became a trending topic. Aquino's image even appeared in news headlines.

== Reception ==
=== Box office ===
The film was a considerable success at the box office. The film's box office performance earned both Requiestas and Aquino the titles "Box Office King and Queen" by the Guillermo Mendoza Memorial Scholarship Foundation Citation.

As for Aquino, her first film's success and recognition paved way for more film and television opportunities. Her comic role landed her the award over other performers' dramatic roles.

=== Critical response ===
Despite its commercial success, the film received negative reviews from the critics, particularly noting that Aquino "has no talent". Cory Aquino was not happy with the critics' focus towards her daughter's acting. In response, Kris Aquino considered this film to be her starting point in her career: "I think that everyone, regardless of who or what you are, should be given the chance to fulfill his or her own dream..." In addition, the critics mentioned Aquino's superficial and glamorous life, which she rebutted as she was involved in charitable works and the like.

== Sequel ==
Due to its box-office success, Pido Dida: Sabay Tayo was followed by two more sequel films, entitled Pido Dida 2: Kasal Na and Pido Dida 3: May Kambal Na.

== Accolades ==
Year	Award-Giving Body	Category	Recipient	Result
1991	GMMSF Box-Office Entertainment Awards	Box-Office Queen	Kris Aquino	Won
1991	GMMSF Box-Office Entertainment Awards	Box-Office King	Rene Requiestas	Won
