= Shotgun Banjo =

- Directed by: Joey Del Rosario
- Written by: Henry Nadong
- Produced by: Lily Y. Monteverde
- Starring: Zoren Legaspi; Ruffa Gutierrez; Paquito Diaz; Miguel Rodriguez
- Cinematography: Boy Dominguez
- Edited by: Tony Sy
- Music by: Nonong Buencamino
- Production company: Regal Films
- Distributed by: Regal Home Video
- Release date: October 15, 1992
- Running time: 104 minutes
- Country: Philippines
- Language: Filipino

Shotgun Banjo is a 1992 Philippine action film starring Zoren Legaspi and Ruffa Gutierrez

== Cast ==
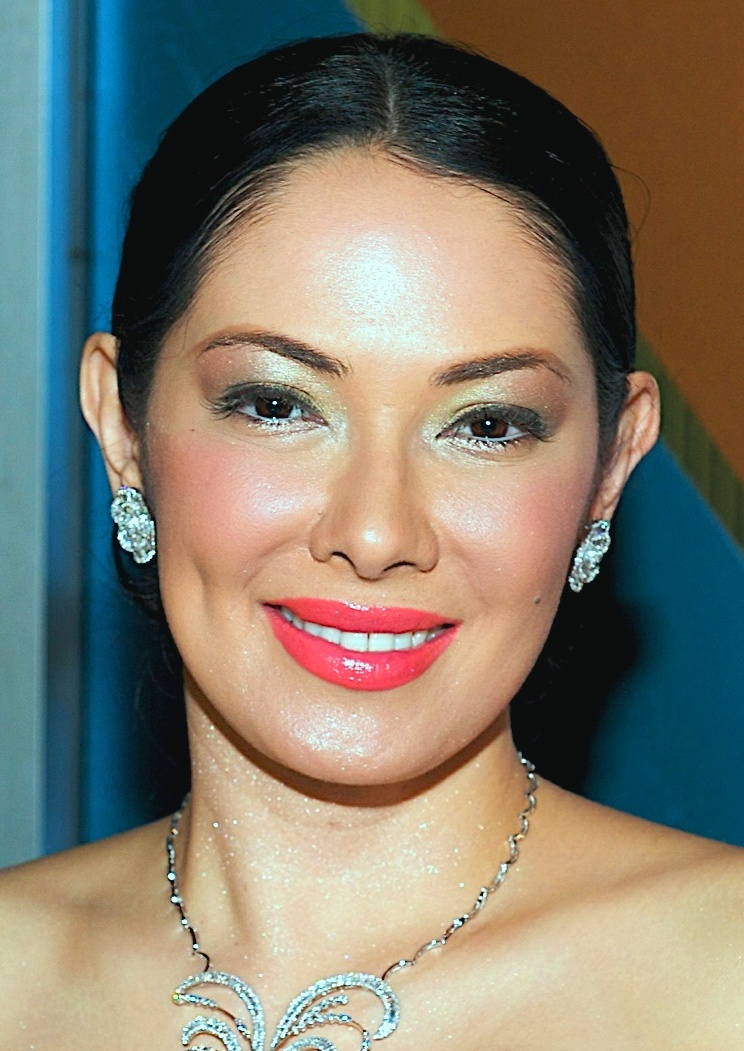
Ruffa Gutierrez portrays Kara, the love interest of Banjo.

- Zoren Legaspi as Banjo
- Ruffa Gutierrez as Kara
- Miguel Rodriguez as Marvin
- Paquito Diaz as Gordon
- Jess Lapid Jr.
- Ernie Zarate
- Romeo Rivera as Dante
- Lucita Soriano as Businesswoman Owner
- Cris Daluz as Businessman Owner
- Manjo Del Mundo
- Rommel Valdez as Rocky Turko
- Subas Herrero as Atty. Davao
- Charlie Davao as Atty. Agustin
- Rachel Lobangco as Lucy
- Terence Baylon as Young Banjo
- Lester Llansang as Young Marvin
- Melissa Mendez
- Orestes Ojeda
- Max Laurel
- Ernie David
- Jimmy Reyes
- Nonoy De Guzman
- Renato del Prado
- Roland Montes
- Vic Belaro
- Aris Bautista
