= Ready!.. Aim!.. Fire!.. =

1987 comedy film starring Tito Sotto, Vic Sotto, Joey de Leon

- Directed by: Mike Relon Makiling
- Written by: Tony Fajardo; Roger Fuentebella
- Produced by: Manuel Andres Yu
- Starring: Tito Sotto; Vic Sotto; Joey de Leon; Joey Albert
- Cinematography: J.R. Peterman
- Edited by: Tikboy Natividad
- Music by: Vicente Sotto III
- Production companies: Cineventures; M-Zet Films; APT Entertainment
- Release date: September 4, 1987
- Country: Philippines
- Language: Filipino

Ready!.. Aim!.. Fire!.. is a 1987 Filipino comedy film directed by Mike Relon Makiling and starring the comedy trio of Tito Sotto, Vic Sotto and Joey de Leon, as well as Joey Albert, Panchito Alba, Ike Lozada, Val Sotto, Mon Alvir, Zorayda Sanchez, and Evelyn Vargas. Produced by Cineventures, it was released on September 4, 1987. Critic Luciano E. Soriano of the Manila Standard gave the film a negative review, criticizing its plot, humor, and low production value.

== Cast ==
- Tito Sotto as Tyson
- Vic Sotto as Sugar Ray
- Joey de Leon as Hagler
- Joey Albert as J.A.
- Panchito Alba as Dong
- Ike Lozada as General Hoto Tay
- Val Sotto
- Mon Alvir
- Zorayda Sanchez
- Evelyn Vargas
- Vangie Labalan
- German Moreno
- Bella Flores
- Bomber Moran as a hijacker
- Charlon Davao
- Bing "Temi" Angeles
- Mildred Gamboa
- Val Tito
- Balot
- Joaquin Fajardo
- Larry Silva as Lauro Longhair

== Release ==
Ready!.. Aim!.. Fire!.. was released on September 4, 1987.

=== Critical response ===
Luciano E. Soriano of the Manila Standard gave the film a negative review, criticizing its haphazardly-written plot, simplistic humor, and poor production value, all of which he assumes was due to a rushed production. He also noted the film's regular use of toilet humor, which he recognized is a staple for the lead trio's films, stating that "[i]t is offensive but the audience loves it just the same."
