= Smith & Wesson (film) =

1988 Filipino comedy film directed by Tony Y. Reyes

- Directed by: Tony Y. Reyes
- Screenplay by: Tony Reyes; Joey de Leon; Vic Sotto
- Story by: Tony Reyes; Jojo Lapus
- Produced by: Vic Sotto; Joey de Leon
- Starring: Vic Sotto; Joey de Leon
- Cinematography: Ely Accion; Rody Lacap
- Edited by: Ike Jarlego Jr.
- Music by: Jimmy Fabregas
- Production company: Viva Films
- Distributed by: Viva Films
- Release date: November 16, 1988
- Country: Philippines
- Language: Filipino

Smith & Wesson is a 1988 Filipino action comedy film co-written and directed by Tony Y. Reyes. It stars Vic Sotto and Joey de Leon as the titular duo, alongside Beverly Vergel, Panchito, Paquito Diaz, Mon Alvir, Angela Luz, Jimmy Fabregas, Rene Requiestas, and Vangie Labalan. Sotto and de Leon are also the film's co-writers and producers. The film parodies both Miami Vice and Bloodsport, with the title in reference to the American firearm manufacturer of the same name.

Smith & Wesson was released by Viva Films on November 16, 1988. The film was praised by critic Lav Diaz for its playful mood and Requiestas' naturally comedic performance, though he criticized the demeaning treatment of women and little people.

The film is streaming online on YouTube.

== Cast ==
- Vic Sotto as Jessie Wesson of the Mayumi Vice Squad
- Joey de Leon as James Smith of the Mayumi Vice Squad
- Beverly Vergel as Beverly
- Angela Luz as Angela
- Panchito as Major Mayumi
- Paquito Diaz as Tio Pablo
- Rene Requiestas as Don Johnson Waks
- Mon Alvir as Andy
- Jimmy Fabregas as Mr. Ayala
- Ester Chavez as Mrs. Ayala
- Ned Hourani as Logan
- Tsing Tsong Tsai as Wang Tao
- Minnie Aguilar as a secretary
- Karen Sto. Domingo as a secretary
- ER Canton Salasar as a detective
- Bert Cayanan as a detective
- Polly Cadsawan as a detective
- Adonis Montemayor as a detective
- Nemie Gutierrez as a detective
- Ernie Forte as a Takusa
- Romy Romulo as a Takusa
- Joe Hardy as a Takusa
- Roger Moring as a Takusa
- Rey Tomenes as a Takusa
- Danny Rojo as a Takusa
- Kay Tuazon as a dancer in Folkhouse
- Vangie Labalan
- Spanky Rigor
- Bomber Moran
- Tito Sotto
- Val Sotto

== Critical response ==
Lav Diaz of the Manila Standard praised the film's playful "mood" and neat editing which easily supplies hilarity, giving special praise to Rene Requiestas' comedic performance as a bumbling villain. However, he criticized the treatment of Angela Luz and Beverly Vergel's characters as eye candy, along with the continuous belittling of little people.
