= Sheman: Mistress of the Universe =

1988 superhero comedy film starring Joey de Leon

- Film poster
- Directed by: Tony Y. Reyes
- Written by: Tony Reyes; Joey de Leon
- Produced by: Joey de Leon
- Starring: Joey de Leon
- Cinematography: Rody Lacap
- Edited by: Ike Jarlego Jr.
- Music by: Jaime Fabregas
- Production company: Viva Films
- Release date: September 7, 1988
- Running time: 102 minutes
- Country: Philippines
- Language: Filipino

Sheman: Mistress of the Universe is a 1988 Filipino fantasy adventure comedy film directed by Tony Reyes and starring Joey de Leon as the titular character, alongside Panchito, Ruffa Gutierrez, Dennis Da Silva, Erik Cayetano, Mylene Gonzales, Paquito Diaz, Ruel Vernal, Timmy Cruz, Palito, and Rene Requiestas. It parodies both the film Masters of the Universe, She-Ra: Princess of Power, and the character Panday as portrayed by Fernando Poe Jr.

In the film, a male blacksmith gains the power to transform into an effeminate superhero dressed in drag.

Produced by Viva Films, the film was released on September 7, 1988. Critic Lav Diaz gave it a mixed review, praising De Leon's parody of Panday early in the film but expressed disappointment in the lessened comedic quality of later scenes involving Sheman.

== Plot ==
Pando is a provincial blacksmith who rescues a gay hermit. The hermit reveals himself to be a refugee from the Kingdom of Gayskull, which has been usurped by Kiss Manay, who in turn has sent goons into Pando's town to abduct children. To rescue the children and take back Gayskull, the hermit gives Pando the power to transform into Sheman, an effeminate superhero in drag with superhuman abilities and magic weapons.

They storm Gayskull, defeat Kiss Manay and rescue the children, after which the Kingdom is transformed back into its original form and the hermit reverts to his former role as prince.

== Cast ==
- Joey de Leon as Pando/Sheman
- Panchito as Tio Paeng
- Ruffa Gutierrez as Tima
- Dennis Da Silva as Lito
- Erik Cayetano as Cris
- Mylene Gonzales
- Paquito Diaz
- Ruel Vernal as Kiss Manay
- Timmy Cruz as Ligaya
- Palito as Skeleton
- Joonee Gamboa as Gayskull
- Atong Redillas
- Rene Requiestas as Stallone
- Yoyong Martirez as Kabo
- Sunshine as Prinsesa Aliksha
- Bamba
- Benjo
- Vic Sotto as the prince
- Tetchie Agbayani as Bubbles
- Jimmy Santos as Joaquin Bordado
- Vangie Labalan
- Alma Lerma as the mother of Ligaya
- Ding Salvador
- Manny Doria
- Carlos Gonzales
- Bomber Moran as Kutchero

Fernando Poe Jr. has an uncredited cameo appearance in the film.

== Production ==
Sheman is actress Timmy Cruz's first film.

== Release ==
Sheman was released on September 7, 1988.

=== Critical response ===
Lav Diaz, writing for the Manila Standard, gave the film a mixed review. Though he praised the early comedic scenes of De Leon parodying Panday (as portrayed by Fernando Poe Jr.) through his blacksmith character Pando, Diaz considered the comedic quality to drop as the film progressed and began to involve Sheman, stating that it then creates an "anti-climactic feeling by the end of the film".

== See also ==
- Pandoy: Ang Alalay ng Panday, a 1993 film also starring De Leon which directly parodies the Panday film series
