= Starzan: Shouting Star of the Jungle =

1989 comedy film by Tony Y. Reyes

- Directed by: Tony Y. Reyes
- Written by: Tony Y. Reyes; Joey de Leon
- Starring: Joey de Leon; Zsa Zsa Padilla; Panchito Alba; Tina Paner
- Cinematography: Rody Lacap; Ely Accion
- Edited by: Efren Jarlego
- Music by: Boy Alcaide
- Production company: Regal Films
- Release date: January 4, 1989
- Running time: 114 minutes
- Country: Philippines
- Language: Filipino

Starzan: Shouting Star of the Jungle, also known as simply Starzan, is a 1989 Filipino comedy film directed by Tony Y. Reyes, written by Reyes and Joey de Leon, and starring de Leon as the titular character. It also stars Zsa Zsa Padilla, Panchito Alba, Tina Paner, Cris Villanueva, Cynthia Patag, and Rene Requiestas. The film is a parody of the Edgar Rice Burroughs character Tarzan.

Produced by Regal Films, it was released on January 4, 1989, and was a box office hit, earning ₱24 million in Metro Manila alone. It became the highest-grossing comedy film in the region at the time, surpassing Batang Quiapo (1986). Critic Lav Diaz gave the film a mixed review, recognizing de Leon and Requiestas as a good comedic duo and commending the film's depiction of the environment's unjust treatment, though he expressed concern about the potentially lowering standards of audiences for films.

The success of Starzan effectively launched a franchise. This includes two sequels, Starzan 2: The Coming of Star Son (1989) and Starzan III: The Jungle Triangle (1990), a spin-off film, Cheeta-eh, Ganda Lalake? (1991), a television series, and an album.

== Cast ==
- Joey de Leon as Starzan
- Zsa Zsa Padilla as Jane
- Panchito Alba as McDoogan
- Tina Paner as Marie
- Cris Villanueva as Anton
- Cynthia Patag as Dooday
- Rene Requiestas as Cheetaeh, Starzan's sidekick
- Rommel Valdez as Ruto
- Spanky Rigor as Indiana Jones
- Don Pepot as Patsangga
- Bomber Moran as Chief Raprap
- Joaquin Fajardo as Chief Bullook
- Vangie Labalan
- Pong Pong
- Larry Silva as a pirate
- Cris Aguilar
- Danny Rojo
- Danny Labra
- Manny Doria
- Rey Solo
- Ernie Forte
- Ding Salvador
- Nemie Gutierrez
- Noel Ong as Ungga, a chimpanzee
- Gerald Granada

== Soundtrack ==
The film's theme song was included in the compilation album Starzan, Cheeta-eh! At Iba Pa Ganda Tugtog (lit. '"Starzan, Cheeta-eh! And Other Wonderful Tunes"').

== Release ==
Starzan was released by Regal Films on January 4, 1989.

=== Box office ===
The film was a box office success, earning ₱24 million in Metro Manila alone. Thus, the film became the highest-grossing comedy film in the region at the time, surpassing Pablo Santiago's Batang Quiapo from three years prior. Executive producer Lily Monteverde gave Joey de Leon a ₱1 million bonus as a result of the film's success.

=== Critical response ===
Lav Diaz, writing for the Manila Standard, gave Starzan a mixed review, stating that though de Leon and Requiestas are a good comedic combination, they need better, "fragrant material". Diaz gave his concern that audiences might only settle for enjoying "kabantutan" (transl. "stench-ity") or lowbrow fare such as the film, citing its inclusion of the yell "Cheetaeh!", the last two syllables of which meaning "poop". However, he commended Starzan's clear depiction of society's disrespectful treatment of the environment, and suggested that the film could be used by the Haribon Foundation in their advocacy.

== Sequels ==
2 more sequels were made, such as Starzan: The Coming of Star Son, which was released on June 7, 1989, six months after the first film was released. And Starzan: The Jungle Tiangle on January 3, 1990. De Leon, Panchito, Requiestas, and Padilla reprise their perspective roles.

== See also ==
- Cheeta-eh, Ganda Lalake?, a 1991 spin-off

== Home media ==
Starzan was released on DVD by Regal Entertainment on July 26, 2013.
