= Rene Requiestas =

Filipino actor and comedian (1957–1993)

The Honorable Rene Requiestas
- Requiestas in Mandurukot (1993)

Member of the Taguig Municipal Council from the 2nd district
- In office July 6, 1992 – July 24, 1993

Personal details
- Born: Renato Licup Requiestas; January 22, 1957 Tondo, Manila, Philippines
- Died: July 24, 1993 (aged 36) Quezon City, Philippines
- Resting place: Manila Memorial Park; Parañaque, Philippines; Cainta Public Cemetery; Cainta, Philippines
- Party: LDP (1991–1993)
- Children: Maeco "Krisnee" L. Rogacion (died 2021)
- Occupation: Actor; Comedian; Politician

Renato "Rene" Licup Requiestas (Tagalog: [rɛˈnɛ rɛkˈjɛstas]; January 22, 1957 – July 24, 1993) was a Filipino actor, comedian and politician. Requiestas was one of the top Filipino comedians of the late 1980s up to the early 1990s. Requiestas was known for his sidekick roles alongside other comedy actors such as Joey de Leon and his pairing with Kris Aquino in romantic comedies, as well as his fluent English speaking, distinctive gaunt, and toothless appearance.

== Career ==
=== Acting career ===
On September 21, 1977, Requiestas, as a member of the newly established Kabataang Barangay, was among 15 recipients of a KB award for his active participation in cultural shows.

Requiestas' early appearances in films consisted of small incidental roles in dramas such as Ikaw Ay Akin in 1978 and Pabling in 1981. From 1987 to 1988, he was a cast member of the stage play WIS: Walang Ibig Sabihin (lit. 'No Meaning') at the Manila Metropolitan Theater, with critic Mike Feria noting his inclination to ad-lib.

He would later receive supporting roles in comedy films beginning with Sheman: Mistress of the Universe in September 1988. His performance in Smith & Wesson as the bumbling villain named Don Johnson Waks was praised by critic Lav Diaz, who considered him to have a natural talent in comedy.

Maricel Soriano, who collaborated with Requiestas in the film Leon at Tigre (lit. 'Lion and Tiger'), expressed that unlike other lead actors she worked with in comedies, he was usually quiet and by himself on the set. Requiestas once remarked that the films he does is largely for his mother, stating that "She is already old and [I] need to be sure that everything is for her. I don't want her to experience anymore hardships at her age."

After Requiestas' death in July 1993, critic Mario E. Bautista expressed regret that Requiestas was unable to star in a single good film in his career in spite of his comedic talents.

=== Political career ===
In 1991, Requiestas filed his candidacy for Councilor of Taguig's 2nd (lone) district under the Party ticket of Dr. Loida Labao of Laban ng Demokratikong Pilipino (LDP) for the 1992 elections and later won. He proclaimed on July 4, 1992 after almost 4 weeks of canvassing of the votes, he place 2 out of 46 other candidates and garnered 20,909 votes and he sworn as Councilor of Taguig on July 6, 1992 until his death on July 24, 1993.

== Personal life ==
In 1989, Requiestas expressed his wish to attend college in order to set an example for his siblings. Later that year, Requiestas adopted a daughter and named her Darren Krisnee, taken from his and Kris Aquino's names. She was born on November 11, 1989, to Requiestas' distant relatives, but due to their difficulty in raising numerous children, Requiestas decided to adopt the child as his own.

== Death ==
Requiestas died on July 24, 1993, at the age of 36 due to tuberculosis, liver and lung failure, and complications caused by alcohol abuse and smoking. He was initially buried in Manila Memorial Park – Sucat in Parañaque and later transferred to Cainta Public Cemetery in Cainta, Rizal.

== Filmography ==
=== Film ===
Year	Title	Role	Note(s)	Ref(s).
1978	Ikaw Ay Akin			Ref(s).
1979	Salawahan	Dimples		
1981	Pabling			
1987	Working Girls 2		Credited as "Rene Requiestos"	
1988	Sheman: Mistress of the Universe	Stallone		
1988	I Love You 3x a Day	Janitor		
1988	Smith & Wesson	Don Johnson Waks		
1988	Kumander Anting-Anting			
1989	Starzan: Shouting Star of the Jungle	Cheetaeh		
1989	Mars Ravelo's Bondying: The Little Big Boy	Rene		
1989	Barbi: Maid in the Philippines	G.I. Joe		
1989	Long Ranger & Tonton: Shooting Stars of the West	Tonton Gutierrez		
1989	Starzan II: The Coming of the Star Son	Cheeta-eh		
1989	Aso't Pusa	Boboy		
1989	Elvis and James: The Living Legends! (Buhay Pa... Mukhang Alamat Na!)	James Dacuycoy		
1989	SuperMouse and the Robo-Rats	Doro		
1989	Gawa Na ang Bala para sa Akin	Rene		
1989	Romeo Loves Juliet (But Their Families Hate Each Other)	Himself		
1990	Starzan III: The Jungle Triangle	Cheeta-eh		
1990	Last Two Minutes	Himself	Cameo	
1990	Small, Medium, Large	Pol		
1990	Elvis and James 2	James Dacuycoy		
1990	Ganda Babae, Ganda Lalake	Ututino Camote		
1990	Little and Big Weapon	Sgt. Sam Flower		
1990	Michael and Madonna	Michael Jackstone		
1990	Pido Dida: Sabay Tayo	Pido		
1990	Samson & Goliath	Goliath		
1990	Si Prinsipe Abante at ang Lihim ng Ibong Adarna	Prinsipe Amante		
1991	Cheeta-eh, Ganda Lalake?	Cheeta-eh		
1991	Alyas Batman en Robin	Joker		
1991	Pido Dida 2: Kasal Na	Pido		
1991	Luv Ko si Ma'am	Felix		
1991	Anak ni Janice	Facundo		
1992	The Return of Long Ranger & Tonton: How the West Was Wrong	Tonton Gutierrez		
1992	Leon at Tigre	Leon Manzano		
1992	First Time: Like a Virgin	Father		
1992	Big Ambulance: Call for Emergency	PJ		
1992	The Good, the Bad & the Ugly	Nardo		
1992	Takbo... Talon... Tili!!!	Kiko	"Mga Laruan nina Kiko, Tito at Toto" segment	
1993	Hulihin: Probinsyanong Mandurukot	Syano		
1993	Pido Dida 3: May Kambal Na	Pido	Posthumously released	
1993	Michael & Madonna 2	Michael Jackstone	Posthumously released	

=== Television ===
Year	Title	Role	Note(s)
1985–1989	U.F.O.: Urbano, Felissa & Others	Unknown	
1987–1989	Sic O'Clock News	Cast member	
1987–1993	Mother	Unknown	
1988–1993	Regal Shockers	Unknown	
1988	Lovingly Yours, Helen	Unknown	
1988–1993	Eat Bulaga!	Himself (guest host)	
1989	Coney Reyes on Camera	Unknown	
1989–1991	Bhoy		Lead role
1990–1993	Sa Linggo nAPO Sila	Unknown	
1990	GMA Presents: Alice	Unknown	
1990	Palibhasa Lalake	Adonis	
1990–1992	Pandakekoks	Unknown	
1991–1993	Maalaala Mo Kaya	Himself	his last TV appearance
2013	Tunay Na Buhay	Himself	aired posthumously 20 years after his death in 1993

== Awards ==
Year	Award-giving body	Category	Movie	Result
1991	GMMSF Box-Office Entertainment Awards	Box-Office King	Pido Dida: Sabay Tayo	Won
