= Ruel Vernal =

Filipino actor (born 1946)

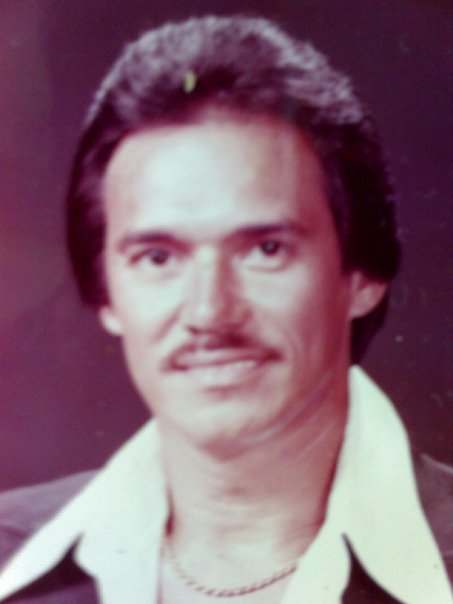
- Vernal in 1994
- Born: Norberto Paranada Venancio; September 8, 1946 (age 80); Manila, Philippines
- Occupations: Actor, brand ambassador
- Years active: 1971–2005
- Children: Mark Vernal; Kevin Vernal
- Awards: Metro Manila Film Festival Best Supporting Actor; 1976 Insiang; Gawad Urian Award Best Supporting Actor; 1977 Insiang

Ruel Vernal (born Norberto Paranada Venancio; September 8, 1946) is a Filipino-American actor. He was known for portraying villain and lead roles in many famous Philippine films. He was also known as the first endorser of Red Horse Beer.

== Biography ==
Ruel Vernal was born on September 8, 1946, in Manila, Philippines. His biological father was an American service member of the U.S. Navy who was stationed at Subic Naval Base, whom he never met. His stepfather was Filipino Antonio Venancio (1901–1985), and his mother was Filipina Rosalina Paranada Venancio (1918–1981), both from San Marcelino, Zambales, Philippines. He also has children who were also actors, Mark Vernal and Kevin Vernal.

== Political views ==
In 1986, Vernal campaigned for the reelection of president Ferdinand Marcos in the 1986 snap election.

== Filmography ==
=== Film ===
Year	Title	Role
1971	Asedillo	Abel
1972	Magiting at Pusakal	
1974	Ang Pinakamagandang Hayop sa Balat ng Lupa	
1976	Insiang	Dado
1977	Walang Katapusang Tag-Araw	Miroy
1979	Darna, Kuno...?	Spaceship alien
1980	Angela Markado	Oscar
1981	Karma	Limbo
1982	Cain and Abel	Jumbo
1982	Roman Rapido	
1983	Kapag Buhay ang Inutang	Bogart
1984	Ang Padrino	Pepeng Tambak
1986	Iyo ang Tondo, Kanya ang Cavite	David
1986	Kamagong	Lorenzo Montero
1986	Muslim .357	Bert
1986	Gabi Na, Kumander	Kumander Manalo
1986	Captain Barbell	
1986	Halimaw	Gorkrah
1987	Kapitan Pablo: Cavite Killing Fields	Miguel
1987	Feliciano Luces: Alyas Kumander Toothpick, Mindanao	
1987	Vigilante	Lt. Resty
1987	Boy Tornado	Kid Amante
1988	Afuang: Bounty Hunter	Brother of Boy Paredes
1988	Boy Negro	Pfc. Bermudez
1988	Kambal Na Kamao: Madugong Engkwentro	
1988	Ompong Galapong: May Ulo, Walang Tapon	
1988	She-Man: Mistress of the Universe	Kiss Manay
1988	Savage Justice	Sanchez
1988	Sgt. Victor Magno: Kumakasa Kahit Nag-iisa	
1989	Eagle Squad	Gunrunner
1989	Long Ranger & Tonton: Shooting Stars of the West	Djanggo
1989	Hindi Pahuhuli ng Buhay	Quintana
1989	SuperMouse and the Robo-Rats	Roborat
1989	Gawa Na ang Bala para sa Akin	Syndicate member
1989	Jones Bridge Massacre (Task Force Clabio)	Sgt. Jose Razon
1990	David Balondo ng Tondo	Lauro
1990	Bad Boy	Boy Bayawak
1991	Pretty Boy Hoodlum	Frankie
1992	Apoy sa Puso	Mildred's bodyguard
1992	Dudurugin Kita ng Bala ko	Kadyo
1992	Amang Capulong: Anak ng Tondo 2	Salasar
1992	Grease Gun Gang	Captain Laconico
1992	Pat. Omar Abdullah: Pulis Probinsya	Raul
1995	Hindi Ka Diyos Para Santuhin	Chief of Police
1995	Bangis	Ernie
1995	Enteng and the Shaolin Kid	Brando
1996	Ober da Bakod 2 (Da Treasure Adbentyur)	Hannibal
1996	Kristo	Peter
1996	Huling Sagupaan	Sgt. Morales
1996	Tolentino	Servando
1997	Boy Chico: Hulihin si Ben Tumbling	Ruel
1997	Super Ranger Kids	Satano
1998	Buhawi Jack	Barok Head
1998	Sige, Subukan Mo	Dormido
2001	Masikip Na ang Mundo Mo, Labrador	Col. Barredo
2003	Utang ng Ama	Totoy Sungit

=== Notable films ===
- 1978 - Juan Tapak
- 1979 - Roberta
- 1980 - Pompa
- 1982 - Brother Ben
- 1983 - Kapag Buhay Ang Inutang
- 1985 - Sa Dibdib ng Sierra Madre
- 1985 - Baun Gang
- 1985 - Calapan Jailbreak
- 1986 - Mabuhay Ka sa Baril
- 1986 - No Return, No Exchange
- 1988 - Alyas Boy Life
- 1989 - Moises Platon
- 1989 - Impaktita
- 1989 - Uzi Brothers
- 1989 - Joe Pring: Manila Police Homicide
- 1990 - Sgt. Clarin
- 1990 - Bad Boy
- 1990 - Apo: Kingpin ng Maynila
- 1990 - May Isang Tsuper ng Taxi
- 1991 - Dudurugin Kita ng Bala Ko
- 1991 - Noel Juico 16, Batang Kriminal
- 1992 - Dito sa Pitong Gatang
- 1992 - Pat. Omar Abdullah: Pulis Probinsiya
- 1993 - Enteng Manok: Tari ng Quiapo
- 1993 - Masahol Pa Sa Hayop
- 1994 - Hindi Pa Tapos ang Laban
- 1994 - Chinatown 2: The Vigilantes
- 1995 - Alfredo Lim: Batas ng Maynila
- 1996 - Hagedorn
- 1996 - Sandata
- 1998 - Buhawi Jack
- 1999 - Black Gun Team
- 2001 - Oras Na para Lumaban
- 2001 - Masikip Na ang Mundo Mo
- 2001 - Eksperto: Ako ang Huhusga
- 2003 - Dayo

=== Television endorsements ===
- 1982 - Red Horse Beer
- 1983 - Red Horse Beer
- 1983 - Red Horse Beer
- 1983 - Red Horse Beer
- 1988–1989 - Standard Electric Fan
