= Joey de Leon =

Filipino actor and comedian (born 1946)

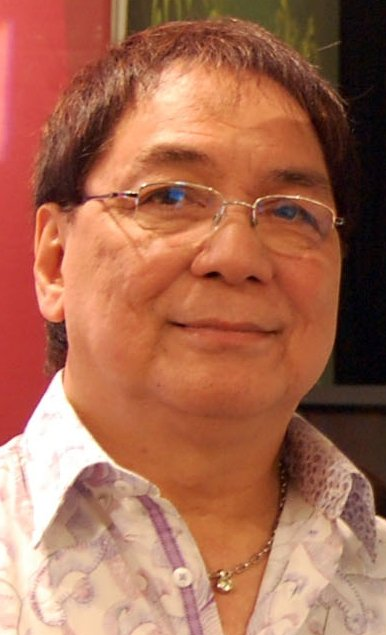
- De Leon in 2010
- Born: Jose Maria Ramos de Leon Jr. October 14, 1946 (age 80); Binondo, Manila, Philippines
- Other names: Boss Joey; Henyo Master
- Occupations: Comedian; actor; television presenter
- Years active: 1969–present
- Television: Intercontinental Broadcasting Corporation (1975–1988); ABS-CBN (1989-2004); GMA Network (1995–2024); ABC/TV5 (1996-2006, 2009–2015, 2023–present)
- Spouses: Daria Ramirez (annulled); Eileen Macapagal (m. 1982)
- Children: 5 (including Keempee)

Jose Maria "Joey" Ramos de Leon Jr. (born October 14, 1946), also known as Henyo Master, is a Filipino comedian, actor, television host and songwriter. He is one of the members of the comedy trio, collectively known as TVJ with the Sotto brothers, Tito and Vic.

Aside from being one of the pioneer hosts of Eat Bulaga!, de Leon is also the creator of the said noontime variety show as recognized by the Intellectual Property Office of the Philippines (IPOPHL), and the co-founder of the show's production company, TVJ Productions.

== Early life ==
De Leon was the second child of Jose Seoane de Leon (1918–2008) of Spanish Filipino descent, and Emma Manahan Ramos (1925–2019). His paternal grandfather was the first mayor of Malolos, Bulacan. When he was three years old, his parents divorced. His father then moved to Madrid, Spain and eventually remarried.

== Career ==
Prior to being an entertainer, de Leon earned his architecture degree from the National University in Manila. He was also a disc jockey for 12 radio stations when he was starting out. De Leon started his showbiz career in the 1960s as a radio disc jockey and announcer. He worked for 12 radio stations, including all seven radio stations owned by ABS-CBN Corporation (including DZMM) as well as other broadcasters like KBS whose had acquiring several broadcasting facilities and channel frequencies formerly used by de Leon's first employers ABS-CBN, such as Channel 9. His first big break on TV was IBC 13's gag show OK Lang.

=== Tito, Vic and Joey ===
In 1975, de Leon became a co-host of GMA Network's late afternoon variety show Discorama hosted by Bobby Ledesma. He invited his former co-stars at OK Lang, the Sotto brothers Tito, Vic and Val, to join him at Discorama. Only Tito and Vic accepted de Leon's invitation. The newly-formed trio began to do comedy newscast segments interspersed with Top 40 hit-song parodies. Originally, the trio's appearance was supposed to be a one-off invitation as Discorama was set to be axed but after getting good feedback from the viewers and high ratings, the show was given a new lease on life by GMA management. The trio was later invited to become part of the noontime show Student Canteen as they released 12 albums based on their Discorama Tough Hits segment.

The sitcom Iskul Bukol gave them nationwide fame as comedians. Soon after, other TV and movie offers came knocking on the trio's door.

In 1979, Tito, Vic and Joey began hosting the noontime show Eat Bulaga!, which was pitted against the more established Student Canteen. Not long after, Eat Bulaga! toppled Student Canteen from the ratings. The trio is still active on both Holy Week Dramas every Lenten Season and also on comedy variety show on Eat Bulaga!.

=== Solo artist ===
Although de Leon continued to do movies alongside his showbiz teammates Tito and Vic, he started doing solo performances for other TV shows. He top billed Joey and Son in 1982, a sitcom on RPN where he played father to a young boy named "Jeffrey Laperal" played back then by Ian Veneracion. He was also one of the gag performers on TODAS where his co-stars included Jimmy Santos and Val Sotto. Other TV shows included Apple Pie, Patis, Atbp., the Sharon Cuneta Show, and Let's Go Crazy. He was launched by Viva Films as a solo comedian in She-Man: Mistress of the Universe. He also tried his hand at directing films like Romeo Loves Juliet and Small, Medium, Large.

De Leon's films include Starzan. De Leon did several TV shows for GMA Network and ABC. In 1995, he made a film comeback via the comedy Bangers for Viva Films as well as Pipti-pipti, Ang Tipo kong Lalake and Takot Ako sa Darling Ko. He hosts Eat Bulaga! which is now the longest-running TV program in the Philippines, and appears in other shows like Mel and Joey, Startalk, Nuts Entertainment and started a new show for ABC, the now-defunct Teka Mona, which replaced Wow Mali, his long-running TV show on the same network. He started hosting Takeshi's Castle with Ryan Yllana. He is also the resident judge of the annual reality-based star search StarStruck and writes the entertainment column "De Leon's Den" once a week in the Philippine broadsheet Manila Bulletin.

In December 2006, de Leon returned to recording with a novelty song he wrote titled "Itaktak Mo" ("Shake It Off"). Seen by critics as his answer to the other wildly popular hit "Boom Tarat Tarat" (written by Lito Camo and sung by de Leon's rival host Willie Revillame), "Itaktak Mo" was softly launched on Eat Bulaga! shortly before the Christmas season. In January 2007, the song was launched on de Leon's album, Joey to the World 2 and gained airplay in most FM stations. "Itaktak Mo" has also become part of Eat Bulaga!'s segment "Taktak Mo o Tatakbo" that replaced "Laban o Bawi", and is also one of the official dances of the 4th batch of the reality talent search StarStruck.

After "Itaktak Mo" became one of the most requested dance tunes of 2007, de Leon followed it up with "Kagat Labi Song", which was launched on Eat Bulaga! on September 22, 2007. The "Kagat Labi" dance craze was already sweeping the whole country by storm before de Leon wrote it. On February 24, 2008, de Leon released a song titled "Walang Daya" ("No Cheating") with lyrics comparing his love to his rival host Willie Revillame's misfortunes (Wilyonaryo, Ferrari and Ultra stampede). He first sang it on his own program Mel and Joey.

On July 31, 2008, de Leon tendered his irrevocable resignation as columnist ("De Leon's Den") for Manila Bulletin, and he is currently with The Philippine Star, and has a column, "Me, Starzan".

In late 2009, de Leon wrote another hit Eat Bulaga! song titled "Ba Ba Boom". Then in early 2010, he wrote another song, "Aalog-Alog". He also wrote the theme song for Diz Iz It!.

In 2011, he played as Pablo Apostol, the rock-star father of George Apostol/DJ Heidee played by Sarah Geronimo in the romantic-comedy film Won't Last a Day Without You.

=== As a songwriter ===
De Leon wrote most of the lyrics of VST & Co. songs and some Cinderella songs. He also co-wrote "Ilagay Mo Kid" with Mike Hanopol which was performed by Hagibis. He also wrote "Ang Labo Mo" for Sharon Cuneta.

== Controversies ==
=== Pepsi Paloma gang rape case ===
15-year old actress Pepsi Paloma accused de Leon and fellow comedians Vic Sotto and Richie D'Horsie of gang raping and taking photos of her on June 21, 1982, in a room at the Sulo Hotel in Quezon City. On July 31, Paloma's manager Rey dela Cruz lodged a formal complaint with Defense Minister Juan Ponce Enrile. On August 18, 1982, Paloma filed charges of rape and acts of lasciviousness against the three television personalities before the Quezon City fiscal's office. The crime of rape at the time, carried the death penalty in the Philippines, and to prevent his brother and his cohorts from being sent to the electric chair, Tito Sotto quickly went to see Paloma while she was still securing the services of attorney Rene Cayetano. According to Paloma, Tito Sotto coerced her into signing an "Affidavit of Desistance" to drop the rape charges against his brother and cohorts—Tito Sotto had allegedly placed a pistol on the table in front of Paloma when he went to talk to her.

=== Depression and self-harm comments ===
On October 5, 2017, de Leon elicited controversy from Filipino netizens and high-profile figures advocating for mental health awareness, following a remark he made about depression during GMA's Eat Bulaga! segment "Juan for All, All for Juan", saying in part that the mental disorder is "just something made up by people" and that "they do it to themselves". He apologized the following day.

On September 23, 2023, de Leon sparked another controversy in TV5's E. A. T. segment "Gimme 5", where he suggested that a rope is one of the most common objects placed on a person's neck, which was widely interpreted by audiences as a reference to suicide by hanging. De Leon's remark was harshly criticised on social media as insensitive, resulting in calls for MTRCB chairperson Lala Sotto – daughter of fellow E.A.T. host Tito Sotto – to investigate on the matter. The management of E.A.T. issued an apology, saying they are "regretful and apologetic to those who were offended by the said utterance".

== Filmography ==
=== Film ===
Year	Title	Role
1979	Mang Kepweng	Tres Dwendes
1979	Swing It... Baby!	Joey
1979	Rock, Baby! Rock!	himself
1980	Iskul Bukol (Freshmen)	Joey Escalera
1980	Mr. One-Two-Three	Ricky
1981	Age Doesn't Matter	Johnny
1981	Palpak Connections	Katch
1981	Bilibid Gays	Daria
1981	D'Gradweyts	Jomari
1981	Tartan	Danny
1981	Magtoning Muna Tayo	Rene Soriano
1981	Mr. One-Two-Three Part 2	Ricky
1982	Si Ako at... Tres Muskiteros!	Ariong Muskitero
1982	Tatlo Silang Tatay Ko	Bronzon
1982	Ang Tapang Para sa Lahat!	Raphael
1983	M.I.B.: Men in Brief	Eugene Williams
1983	My Darling Princess	Joakim
1984	Goodah!	Owen
1984	Give Me Five	Jackson
1984	Pepe en Pilar	Pepper
1984	Naku Ha!	Billy Jean
1985	I Have Three Hands	Carlos "Caloy" Agatep
1985	Ride on Baby	John
1985	Doctor, Doctor We Are Sick	Robin
1985	Mama Said, Papa Said, I Love You	Boy
1985	Ma'am May We Go Out?	Jeff Soriano
1985	Working Boys	Ernie
1985	Super Wan, Tu, Tri	Baltazar
1986	Send in the Clowns	Jojo
1986	Horsey-Horsey, Tigidig-Tigidig	Gringo
1987	The Best of Iskul Bukol: The Movie	Joey Escalera
1987	Forward March	Dodong
1987	Shoot That Ball	Tinggoy
1987	Ready!.. Aim!.. Fire!..	Hagler
1988	Fly Me to the Moon	Jacko
1988	Wake Up Little Susie	Alexander
1988	Sheman: Mistress of the Universe	Pando/She-Man
1988	Good Morning, Titser	Priest
1988	I Love You 3x a Day	Fairy godmother
1988	Smith & Wesson	James Smith
1989	Starzan: Shouting Star of the Jungle	Starzan
1989	Barbi: Maid in the Philippines	Bartolome/Barbi
1989	Si Malakas at si Maganda	Police Officer
1989	Long Ranger & Tonton: Shooting Stars of the West	Davie Bowie aka Long Ranger
1989	Starzan II: The Coming of the Star Son	Stazan
1989	Elvis and James: The Living Legends! (Buhay Pa... Mukhang Alamat Na!)	Elvis Presto
1989	SuperMouse and the Robo-Rats	Mickey
1989	Romeo Loves Juliet... But Their Families Hate Each Other!	Romeo Sr.
1990	Hotdog	Pedro
1990	Small, Medium, Large	Prince/Director
1990	My Funny Valentine	Mang Pandoy
1990	Elvis and James 2	Elvis Presto
1990	Ganda Babae, Gandang Lalake	Joseph
1990	Kabayo Kids	Pando/Yellow Banana
1990	Little & Big Weapon	Mel Bigson
1990	I Have 3 Eggs	Ariong
1990	Tangga and Chos: Beauty Secret Agents	Ray Tangga
1990	Starzan III: The Jungle Triangle	Starzan
1990	Little Boy Blue: Tiny Terrestrial	Prof. Edwin Presto
1990	Tiny Terrestrial: The Three Professors	Prof. Edwin Presto
1991	Ali in Wonderland	Fernando/Ali
1991	Barbi 2: For President	Bartolome/Barbi del Rosario
1991	Onyong Majikero	Ervin
1991	Goosebuster	Patrick Sisi
1992	The Return of the Long Ranger & Tonton: How the West Was Wrong	Davie Bowie a.k.a. Long Ranger
1992	The Wild Cowboys	Juan Gomez
1992	Sam and Miguel	Miguel
1993	Alyas Batman en Robin	Batman/Bruce
1993	Pandoy, ang Alalay ng Panday	Pandoy
1995	Bangers	Hip
1995	Run Barbi Run	Bartolome
1996	Detective: Michael & Jackson	Ricky Lashley
1996	Ang Tipo kong Lalake (Maginoo Pero Medyo Bastos)	Boy
1996	Ang Misis kong Hoodlum	Andy
1997	Pipti-pipti: One for You, Two for Me	Jack
1997	Takot Ako sa Darling Ko	Santi
1997	Wow! Multo	Kuya Joe Baruc
2001	Super Idol	Pandoy
2003	Lastikman	Elmer
2003	Pakners	Pickpocketer
2003	Fantastic Man	Doc
2004	Enteng Kabisote: OK Ka Fairy Ko... The Legend	Mulawit
2005	Enteng Kabisote 2: Okay Ka Fairy Ko... The Legend Continues!	Panggay
2006	Enteng Kabisote 3: Okay Ka, Fairy Ko: The Legend Goes On and On and On	Shintaro Gokoyami
2007	Enteng Kabisote 4: Okay Ka Fairy Ko...The Beginning of the Legend	Karimarimar
2008	Iskul Bukol: 20 Years After	Joey Escalera
2009	Ang Darling Kong Aswang	Mang Kepweng
2011	Pak! Pak! My Dr. Kwak!	Doctor
2011	Won't Last a Day Without You	Pablo Apostol
2013	My Little Bossings	SPO2 Bryant
2015	My Bebe Love: KiligPaMore	Dom
2016	Enteng Kabisote 10 and the Abangers	Pandoy
2017	Barbi: D' Wonder Beki	Barbie
2022	My Teacher	Solomon

=== Television ===
Year	Show	Role
1975–1976	OK Lang	Himself/Host
1975–1979	Discorama	Himself/Co-host
1976–1979	Student Canteen	Himself/Co-host
1978–1988	Iskul Bukol	Joey Escalera
1980–1988	T.O.D.A.S.: Television's Outrageously Delightful All-Star Show	Himself/Host
1979–present	Eat Bulaga!	Himself/Host
1982	Joey and Son	Joey
1987–1989	Apple Pie, Patis Atbp.	Himself/Host
1988–1997	The Sharon Cuneta Show	Himself/Co-host
1990	TVJ (TeleVision's Jesters)	Various
1992	TVJ on 5	Various
1992	Mr. DJ	Various
1992	Rock n' Roll 2000	Teodoro Enriquez
1994–1997	Mixed Nuts: Numero Unong Terrific Show	Himself/Host
1996–2006; 2009–2010	Wow Mali	Himself/Host
1997–1998	Ibang Klase	Himself/Role
1999	Beh Bote Nga	Tio Pot
1999–2000	Back to Iskul Bukol	Josemari "Joey" Escalera
2001	S Files	Guest Host
2001	Korek na Korek Ka Diyan	Himself/Host
2002	Kiss Muna	Himself/Host
2002–2003	Sana ay Ikaw na Nga	Dr. Ricardo Peron
2003–2008	Nuts Entertainment	Himself/Host
2003–2004	SOP Rules	Himself/Guest co-host
2003–2006; 2015	StarStruck	Himself/Judge
2004–2015	Startalk	Himself/Host
2004–2011	Mel and Joey	Himself/Host
2005-2006	Wow Maling Mali!	Himself/Host
2005	Magpakailanman	Himself/Guest
2006–2007	Teka Mona!	Himself/Host
2006; 2006–2009	Takeshi's Castle	Himself/Host
2007	Slingo	Himself/Host
2008	Jungle TV	Himself/Host
2009	Joey's Quirky World	Himself/Host
2009	Suwerteng-Suwerte sa Siyete: Spin It! Win It!	Himself/Host
2010–2011	Wow! Meganon?!	Himself/Host
2010–2011	House or Not	Himself/Host (as Don Joey)
2010	Suwerteng-Suwerte sa Siyete: Press It! Win It!	Himself/Host
2011	Mind Master	Himself/Host
2011	Big Shot Jackpot	Himself/Host
2011	Suwerteng-Suwerte sa Siyete: Win Mo, Kapuso!	Himself/Host
2011	Protégé: The Battle for the Big Break	Himself/Judge
2011–2012	Celebrity Samurai	Himself/Host
2012	The Biggest Game Show in the World - Asia	Himself/Host
2012–2013	Game 'N Go	Himself/Host
2012	Protégé: The Battle for the Big Break	Himself/Judge
2012	Dolphy Alay Tawa	Himself/Guest
2013	Hayop sa Galing	Himself/Host
2013–2014	Sunday All Stars	Himself/Judge
2013–2015	Wow Mali Pa Rin!	Himself/Host
2014	Hakbang Sa Pangarap: Eat Bulaga Lenten Drama Special 2014	Abe
2014	One of the Boys	DJ
2015	Wow Mali: Lakas ng Tama	Himself/Host
2015	Pinagpalang Ama: Eat Bulaga Lenten Drama Special 2015	Papsy
2015–2016	CelebriTV	Himself/Host
2016	Dalangin ng Ama: Eat Bulaga Lenten Special	Omar
2017	Kaibigan: Eat Bulaga Lenten Special	Jeff
2022–present	Oh No! It's B.O. (Biro Only)!	Himself/Host

=== As voice actor ===
Year	Title	Role	Notes	Source
2012	Ben 10: Destroy All Aliens	Max Tennyson	Filipino dub	

== Albums/songs discography ==
- TVJ Tough Hits series (12 albums) (Vicor Music Corp.)
- 1990: Joey de Leon Tough Hits 1990 (OctoArts International, now PolyEast Records)
- 1993: JoeyRassic (MCA Music)
- 1999: Mga Pakyuuuut ni Joey de Leon (OctoArts-EMI Music, now PolyEast Records)
- 2003: "Spageti Song" (duet with Sexbomb Girls from the album Round 2) (Sony BMG)
- 2004: "Halukay Ube" (duet with Sexbomb Girls from the album Bomb Thr3at) (Sony BMG)
- 2004: Joey to the World (Sony BMG Music)
- 2007: Joey to the World 2 (Sony BMG Music) (featuring "Itaktak Mo")
- 2008: Kagat Labi (EMI Philippines, now PolyEast Records)

== Awards ==
Year	Award-Giving Body	Category	Work/Nominee	Result
2008	38th GMMSF Box-Office Entertainment Awards	Most Popular Novelty Singer	Itaktak Mo!	Won
2009	23rd PMPC Star Awards for Television	Best Comedy Actor	Nuts Entertainment	Nominated
2009	23rd PMPC Star Awards for Television	Best Magazine Show Host (with Mel Tiangco)	Mel and Joey	Nominated
2009	23rd PMPC Star Awards for Television	Best Male Showbiz Oriented Talk Show Host	Startalk	Nominated
2010	24th PMPC Star Awards for Television	Best Male TV Host	Eat Bulaga!	Won
2010	Eastwood City Walk of Fame	Walk of Fame Star Inductee	Himself	Inducted
2011	Golden Screen TV Awards	Outstanding Male Host in a Musical or Variety Program	Eat Bulaga!	Nominated
2014	PEP List Awards	Pepsi' Choice: Male Showbiz Treasure of the Year	Himself	Won
2015	63rd FAMAS Awards	FAMAS Lifetime Achievement Award	Tito Sotto, Vic Sotto, and Joey de Leon	Won

Year	Award giving body	Category	Nominated work	Results
2000	PMPC Star Awards for Television	Ading Fernando Lifetime Achievement Award(shared with Tito Sotto and Vic Sotto)	—N/a	Won
2008	Awit Awards	Best Novelty Recording	"Itaktak Mo"	Won

== See also ==
- Pepsi Paloma
- Spoliarium (Eraserheads song)
- The Rapists of Pepsi Paloma (film)
