= Maricel Soriano filmography =

Filipino actress filmography

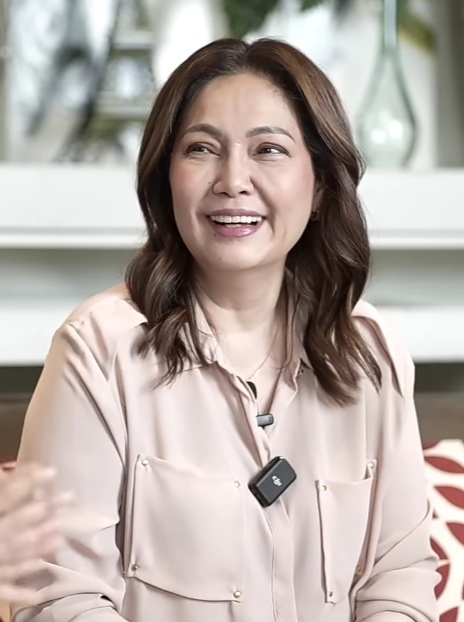
Soriano in 2023

Maricel Soriano is a Filipino actress who has appeared extensively in film and television. She began a career as a child actress, debuting in the 1971 film titled My Heart Belongs to Daddy, appearing alongside Tirso Cruz III. She went on to perform several roles in the 1970s, gaining her first acting award at the 9th Manila Tagalog Film Festival as "Best Child Actress" for her role in Alaala Mo, Daigdig Ko (1973) and the longest running Philippine sitcom John en Marsha (1973-1991), where she played the role of Shirley Puruntong. A supporting role in the film Yakuza Contract (1978) proved to be a breakthrough for Soriano; she received her first FAMAS Award nomination for it at age 14. In 1980, she was introduced as one of the first Regal Babies and launched a love team tandem with William Martinez the following year. They appeared in several movies together including Galawgaw (1982), Summer Holiday (1982), To Mama With Love (1983), Teenage Marriage (1984), Anak ni Waray, Anak ni Biday (1984), and Inday Bote (1985).

The following years saw Soriano as a prominent figure in television. She starred in her own variety shows Maria! Maria! (1986) and Maricel Live! (1986), showcasing skills in singing, dancing, and hosting, establishing herself as a multi-faceted performer. She also headlined two long-time drama anthologies on ABS-CBN; Maricel Regal Drama Special (1987-1990) and The Maricel Drama Special (1990-1997). She achieved wider recognition from critics and award-giving bodies as a dramatic actress after doing a slew of sitcoms and comedy films. She received seventeen "Best Actress" nominations at the FAMAS Awards, winning three for her performances in Dahas (1995), Nasaan ang Puso (1997), and Meet, Greet & Bye (2026). Among her other notable award-winning films includes the 1983 film Saan Darating Ang Umaga (for which she won her first FAMAS, a FAMAS Best Supporting Actress Award), Kaya Kong Abutin ang Langit (1984), Pinulot Ka Lang sa Lupa (1987), Babaeng Hampaslupa (1988), Dinampot Ka Lang sa Putik (1991), Ikaw Pa Lang ang Minahal (1992), Separada (1994), Inagaw Mo ang Lahat sa Akin (1995), Ama, Ina, Anak (1996), Soltera (1999), Abot-Kamay ang Pangarap (1996), Abandonada (2000), Inang Yaya (2006) and A Love Story (2007). Soriano's films released since 2000 have collectively earned ₱950 million, making her one of the highest grossing Filipino box office stars this century.

== Film ==
Key
†	Denotes films that have not yet been released

=== 1970s ===
Maricel Soriano's film credits with year of release, film titles and roles
Year	Title	Role	Notes	Ref(s)
1971	My Heart Belongs to Daddy			
1973	Dalawang Mukha ng Tagumpay			
1973	Cofradia	Young Cofradia		
1973	Captain Barbell Boom!			
1974	Ala-ala Mo, Daigdig Ko!			
1974	John & Marsha	Shirley Puruntong		
1975	Lady Luck			
1975	Die Stunde Der Tödlichen Fäuste (Da du xiao)			
1975	John & Marsha sa Amerika (Part Two)	Shirley Puruntong		
1975	Son of Fung Ku			
1976	Kaliwa't Kanan ...Sakit ng Katawan			
1977	Omeng Satanasia	Bing		
1977	Sgt. Dalagon			
1977	John and Marsha '77	Shirley Puruntong		
1978	Yakuza Contract			
1979	Dancing Master	Elizabeth		

=== 1980s ===
Maricel Soriano's film credits with year of release, film titles and roles
Year	Title	Role	Notes	Ref(s)
1980	Dolphy's Angels	Guest		
1980	John & Marsha '80	Shirley Puruntong		
1980	Underage	Cecilia		
1981	Bihagin: Bilibid Boys	Guest		
1981	Age Doesn't Matter	Bengbeng		
1981	Oh, My Mama!	Maricel/Mama Cel		
1981	Estong Balisong			
1981	Pabling			
1981	Summer Love	Dianna		
1982	School Girls			
1982	My Heart Belongs to Daddy	Ditas		
1982	Galawgaw	Olga		
1982	Mother Dear	Guia		
1982	Hindi Kita Malimot	Celia Legarda		
1982	No Other Love			
1982	Dancing Masters 2: Macao Connection	Elizabeth		
1982	Story of Three Loves	Silvestra " Bes" Batungbakal		
1982	Boystown	Laida		
1982	I Love You, I Hate You			
1982	Santa Claus Is Coming to Town!			
1983	Ang Boyfriend Kong Kano			
1983	Parang Kailan Lang			
1983	Da Best of John & Marsha sa Pelikula	Shirley Puruntong		
1983	To Mama with Love	Sabrina		
1983	Pepe en Pilar	Pilar		
1983	Saan Darating ang Umaga?	Shayne Rodrigo		
1983	Summer Holiday			
1983	Daddy Knows Best			
1983	Minsan, May Isang Ina	Noemi		
1984	Da Best of John & Marsha sa Pelikula Part II	Shirley Puruntong		
1984	Daddy's Little Darlings	Honey		
1984	Kaya Kong Abutin ang Langit	Clarisse/Clarissa		
1984	Teenage Marriage	Mirriam Nieva		
1984	Anak ni Waray vs Anak ni Biday	Amy		
1985	Ride On Baby			
1985	John & Marsha '85 (Sa Probinsiya)	Shirley Puruntong		
1985	Hinugot sa Langit	Carmen Castro		
1985	Pahiram ng Ligaya	Josephine Reyes		
1985	Inday Bote	Inday Vargas		
1985	I Have Three Hands	Bridget		
1985	Mga Kuwento ni Lola Basyang	Cathy	Segment "Zombies"	
1986	Yesterday Today & Tomorrow	Anna		
1986	John & Marsha '86: TNT sa Amerika	Shirley Puruntong		
1986	When I Fall in Love	Carolina		
1986	The Graduates	Lor		
1986	Horsey-Horsey, Tigidig-Tigidig	Belinda		
1986	Super Islaw and the Flying Kids			
1986	Inday Inday sa Balitaw	Inday/Maria Luisa		
1986	Batang Quiapo	Maria		
1986	Payaso	Guest		
1987	Jack en Poy, Hale-hale Hoy!	Jack		
1987	Maria Went to Town	Maria / Marie Pasoksok & Mary del Castillo		
1987	Pinulot Ka Lang sa Lupa	Angeli		
1988	Taray at Teroy	Estela "Taray" Caluglog		
1988	Stupid Cupid		Segment "Horror Honeymoon"	
1988	Super Inday and the Golden Bibe	Super Inday/Inday		
1988	Sa Akin Pa Rin ang Bukas	Carmela Samaniego/Mary Rose		
1988	Babaing Hampaslupa	Remedios		
1989	Gorio en Tekla	Gorio/Gregory		
1989	Mga Kuwento ng Pag-ibig	Chayong/Monique	Segment "Ginto't Pilak Namumulaklak"	
1989	Kung Maibabalik Ko Lang	Donna		

=== 1990s ===
Maricel Soriano's film credits with year of release, film titles and roles
Year	Title	Role	Notes	Ref(s)
1991	John en Marsha Ngayon '91	Shirley Puruntong		
1991	Dinampot Ka Lang sa Putik	Malou		
1992	Leon at Tigre	Alice		
1992	Ikaw Pa Lang ang Minahal	Adela Sevilla		
1992	Dobol Dribol	Estefan		
1993	Ligaw-ligawan, Bahay-bahayan, Kasal-kasalan	Paquita		
1993	Manchichiritchit	Dorie		
1994	Minsan Lang Kita Iibigin	Terry delos Reyes		
1994	Nagkataon Nagkatagpo	Jessie		
1994	Vampira	Paz		
1994	Separada	Melissa Neri		
1995	Pustahan Tayo Mahal Mo Ako	Cristy		
1995	Ikaw Pa... Eh Love Kita	Karina Ranches		
1995	Dahas	Luisa		
1996	Ang Tange Kong Pag-ibig	Amanda Moran		
1996	Inagaw Mo ang Lahat sa Akin	Jacinta		
1996	Ama, Ina, Anak	Marilen		
1996	Kung Kaya Mo, Kaya Ko Rin!	Salvacion "Sally"		
1996	Abot-Kamay Ang Pangarap	Elena		
1997	Sabi Mo Mahal Mo Ako Wala ng Bawian	Roselle		
1997	Minsan Lamang Magmamahal	Marietta		
1997	Kahit Minsan Lang	Guest (Gloria)		
1997	Nasaan ang Puso	Joy		
1998	Kung Ayaw Mo, Huwag Mo!	Doris		
1998	Sige, Subukan Mo	Panyang		
1998	Tulak ng Bibig Kabig ng Dibdib	Mariel		
1999	Soltera	Sandra		
1999	Sa Piling ng Aswang	Marines Villanueva		

=== 2000s ===
Maricel Soriano's film credits with year of release, film titles and roles
Year	Title	Role	Notes	Ref(s)
2000	Abandonada	Gemma		
2000	Tunay na Mahal	Casilda		
2001	Mila	Mila Cabangon		
2002	Mano Po	Vera Go		
2003	Filipinas	Yolanda Filipinas		
2004	I Will Survive!	Cynthia		
2006	Numbalikdiwa	Portia/Karissa		
2006	Inang Yaya	Norma		
2007	Paraiso: Tatlong Kuwento ng Pag-asa	Jocelyn		
2007	A Love Story	Joanna Villanueva		
2007	Bahay Kubo: A Pinoy Mano Po!	Eden Manahan		
2009	T2	Claire		
2009	Last Supper No. 3	Guest		

=== 2010s ===
Maricel Soriano's film credits with year of release, film titles and roles
Year	Title	Role	Notes	Ref(s)
2011	Yesterday, Today, Tomorrow	Mariel Montes		
2012	D' Kilabots Pogi Brothers Weh!	Guest		
2013	Momzillas	Clara del Valle		
2013	Bekikang: Ang Nanay Kong Beki	Cameo		
2013	Girl, Boy, Bakla, Tomboy	Pia Jackstone	Official Entry for the 39th Metro Manila Film Festival	
2016	Lumayo Ka Nga Sa Akin	Cora Catacutan		
2018	My 2 Mommies	Tita Baby Castillo		
2019	The Heiress	Auntie Luna		

=== 2020s ===
Maricel Soriano's film credits with year of release, film titles and roles
Year	Title	Role	Notes	Ref(s)
2023	In His Mother's Eyes	Lucy	Main role	
TBA	Re-Live: A Tale of an American Island Cheerleader	Thelma		
2025	First Light	Linda		
2025	Meet, Greet & Bye	Baby Lopez-Facundo	Main role	p
2026	Life After You	Bella	Main role	
2026	Haunted Carnival		Main role	

== Television ==
Key
†	Denotes shows that have not yet been aired

Maricel Soriano's television credits with year of release, show titles and roles
Year	Title	Role	Notes	Ref(s)
1972	Bahay-bahayan	Tessie	Support Role	
1973	John en Marsha	Shirley Puruntong	Support Role	
1978	Kaluskos Musmos	Jacklyn Pusit	Support Role	
1979	Maria Morena	Maria	Main Role	
1981	Lovingly Yours, Helen	Herself	Episode Guest	
1981	Kuskos Balungos	Abigail	Support Role	
1982	Two Plus Two	Maricel Alyas "George"	Main Role	
1985	Eat Bulaga!	Host		
1985	I Am What I Am	Host		
1986	Maricel Live!	Host		
1986	Maria! Maria!	Host		
1986	Let's Go Crazy with Jack and Joey	Jack	Main role	
1987	Maricel Regal Drama Special	Various roles	Lead role	
1990	The Maricel Drama Special	Various roles	Lead role	
1997	Kaya ni Mister, Kaya ni Misis	Mary Magtanggol	Main Role	
2001	Mary D' Potter	Mary Panyurutan	Lead role	
2002	Bida si Mister, Bida si Misis	Mary Magtanggol	Main Role	
2003	Maalaala Mo Kaya: Sing-along Bar	Ai-Ai delas Alas	Episode guest	
2005–2006	Vietnam Rose	Carina Mojica dela Cerna / Nguyễn Đặng Thiêm Yểu	Lead role	
2006	John and Shirley	Shirley Puruntong-Ramirez	Lead role	
2007	Wowowee	Guest host		
2009	Sineserye Presents: Florinda	Florinda Arguelles	Lead Role	
2010	5 Star Special Presents: Maricel Soriano	Various roles	Lead Role	
2010	Pilyang Kerubin	Regina	Special Participation	
2013	Toda Max	Maria	Guest role	
2014	Ang Dalawang Mrs. Real	Millet Gonzales-Real	Main Role	
2017	Maalaala Mo Kaya: Baso	Gregoria "Guily" Espinosa	Supporting role	
2019	The General's Daughter	Isabelle "Nanang Sabel" Sarmiento	Support Role	
2020–2021	Ang sa Iyo ay Akin	Lucinda "Lucing" Dela Cruz-Pineda	Support Role	
2022	Quizon CT	Herself	Guest Role	
2023	Pira-Pirasong Paraiso	Amanda Barrameda (Season 2)	Support Role	
2023-2024	Linlang (The Teleserye Version)	Amelia Contreras-Lualhati	Main Role	
2023	Drag Race Philippines	Herself	Guest judge; Episode: "Dramarama Mama!"	
2024	3-in-1	Irish Liberica	Main role	
2024	Lavender Fields	Aster Fields	Main role	
2025	It's Showtime	Guest		

== See also ==
- List of awards and nominations received by Maricel Soriano
