= List of awards and nominations received by Maricel Soriano =

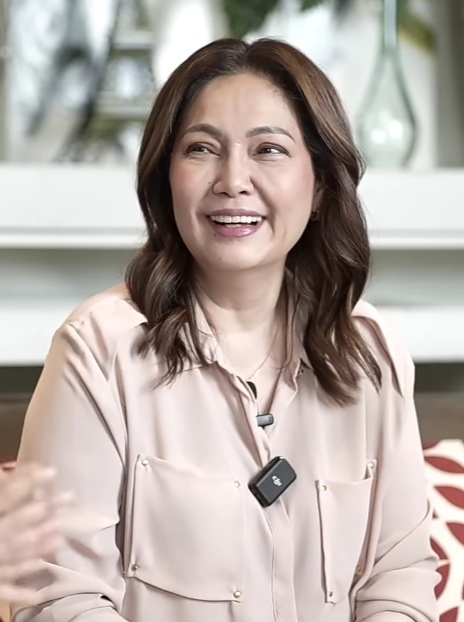
Soriano in 2023

Filipino actress and Diamond Star Maricel Soriano has received numerous accolades in her 56-year career for her performances in film and television. She is the third most awarded Filipino actress of all time, having won two Asian Television Awards, six FAMAS Awards, four Luna Awards, six Metro Manila Film Festival Awards, twelve Star Awards for both Movies and Television and six Golden Screen Awards for both Movies and Television including eight nominations for Gawad Urian Awards.

Soriano started her career as a child actress, appearing in a supporting role in the romantic drama My Heart Belongs to Daddy (1971). At age nine, she won the Manila Film Festival for Best Child Actress for her role in the drama film Alaala Mo, Daigdig Ko (1974). She earned her first FAMAS nomination for Best Child Actress for her role in the action drama Yakuza Contract (1978) and won her first FAMAS Award for Best Supporting Actress for her performance in the family drama Saan Darating ang Umaga? (1983). She has tallied seventeen FAMAS Best Actress nominations, winning three for Dahas (1995), Nasaan ang Puso (1997), and Meet, Greet & Bye (2026). From seventeen nominations, Soriano has also won four Luna Award for Best Actress for her roles in Nasaan ang Puso (1997), Filipinas (2003), Bahay Kubo: A Pinoy Mano Po! (2007), and In His Mother's Eyes (2024).

Soriano has won the Asian Television Award for Best Comedy Actress for two consecutive years (1998-1999) for her performance in the sitcom Kaya ni Mister, Kaya ni Misis (1997). She has been inducted into the Metro Manila Film Festival hall of fame in 2019 and is the second most awarded leading actress at the film festival, winning for her roles in Nasaan ang Puso (1997), Filipinas (2003), Bahay Kubo: A Pinoy Mano Po! (2007), Yesterday, Today, Tomorrow (2011) and Girl, Boy, Bakla, Tomboy (2013). For her work in small screen, she has won Star Awards for Best Drama Actress: twice for Maricel Regal Drama Special (1988 and 1989), The Maricel Soriano Drama Special (1997), Vietnam Rose (2005) and Florinda (2009).

== Awards and nominations ==
Awards and nominations received by Maricel Soriano
Organizations (Note: Awards, festivals, honors and other miscellaneous organizations are listed in alphabetical order.)	Year (Note: Indicates the year of ceremony. Each year is linked to the article about the awards held that year, wherever possible.)	Recipient(s)	Category	Result	Ref(s).
Asian Television Awards	1998	Kaya ni Mister, Kaya ni Misis	Best Comedy Actress	Won	
Asian Television Awards	1999	Kaya ni Mister, Kaya ni Misis	Best Comedy Actress	Won	
Box Office Entertainment Awards	1983	Galawgaw	Teenage Box Office Queen	Won	
Box Office Entertainment Awards	1984	Pepe en Pilar	Teenage Box Office Queen	Won	
Box Office Entertainment Awards	1985	Inday Bote	Ms. RP Movies	Won	
Box Office Entertainment Awards	1988	Batang Quiapo	Ms. RP Movies	Won	
Box Office Entertainment Awards	1989	Babaing Hampaslupa	Ms. RP Movies	Won	
Box Office Entertainment Awards	1994	Separada	Ms. RP Movies	Won	
Box Office Entertainment Awards	1999	Soltera	Ms. RP Movies	Won	
Box Office Entertainment Awards	2004	Filipinas	Ms. RP Movies	Won	
Box Office Entertainment Awards	2007	Inang Yaya	Film Actress of the Year	Won	
Box Office Entertainment Awards	2008	A Love Story	Film Actress of the Year	Won	
Box Office Entertainment Awards	2014	Girl, Boy, Bakla, Tomboy	Film Actress of the Year	Won	
Box Office Entertainment Awards	2020	The General's Daughter	Best Acting Ensemble in a Drama Series	Won	
Box Office Entertainment Awards	2025	3 in 1	Comedy Actress of the Year	Won	
	2025	Lavender Fields	Best Acting Ensemble in a Drama Series	Won	
Cinemanila International Film Festival	2006	Numbalikdiwa	Best Actress	Won	
FAMAS Awards	1979	Yakuza Contract	Best Child Actress	Nominated	
FAMAS Awards	1984	Saan Darating ang Umaga	Best Supporting Actress	Won	
FAMAS Awards	1985	Kaya Kong Abutin ang Langit	Best Actress	Nominated	
FAMAS Awards	1988	Pinulot Ka Lang sa Lupa	Best Actress	Nominated	
FAMAS Awards	1989	Babaing Hampaslupa	Best Actress	Nominated	
FAMAS Awards	1992	Dinampot ka Lang sa Putik	Best Actress	Nominated	
FAMAS Awards	1993	Ikaw Pa Lang ang Minahal	Best Actress	Nominated	
FAMAS Awards	1995	Separada	Best Actress	Nominated	
FAMAS Awards	1996	Dahas	Best Actress	Won	
FAMAS Awards	1997	Ama, Ina, Anak	Best Actress	Nominated	
FAMAS Awards	1998	Nasaan ang Puso	Best Actress	Won	
FAMAS Awards	2000	Soltera	Best Actress	Nominated	
FAMAS Awards	2001	Abandonada	Best Actress	Nominated	
FAMAS Awards	2003	Mano Po	Best Actress	Nominated	
FAMAS Awards	2004	Filipinas	Best Actress	Nominated	
FAMAS Awards	2007	Inang Yaya	Best Actress	Nominated	
FAMAS Awards	2008	A Love Story	Best Actress	Nominated	
FAMAS Awards	2015	Maricel Soriano	Iconic Movie Queen of Philippine Cinema	Won	
FAMAS Awards	2019	Maricel Soriano	Dolphy King of Comedy Award	Won	
FAMAS Awards	2024	In His Mother's Eyes	Best Actress	Nominated	
FAMAS Awards	2026	Meet, Greet & Bye	Best Actress	Won	
Gawad Pasado	1999	Soltera	Best Actress	Won	
Gawad Pasado	2007	Inang Yaya	Best Actress	Won	
Gawad Pasado	2010	T2	Best Actress	Nominated	
Gawad Tanglaw	2006	Maricel Soriano	Achiever's Award	Won	
Gawad Tanglaw	2020	The General's Daughter	Best Actress	Won	
Gawad Urian	1993	Ikaw Pa Lang ang Minahal	Best Actress	Nominated	
Gawad Urian	1996	Dahas	Best Actress	Nominated	
Gawad Urian	1997	Abot Kamay ang Pangarap	Best Actress	Nominated	
Gawad Urian	1998	Minsan Lamang Magmamahal	Best Actress	Nominated	
Gawad Urian	2000	Soltera	Best Actress	Nominated	
Gawad Urian	2002	Mila	Best Actress	Nominated	
Gawad Urian	2004	Filipinas	Best Actress	Nominated	
Gawad Urian	2007	Inang Yaya	Best Actress	Nominated	
Golden Screen Awards	2004	Filipinas	Best Performance by an Actress in a Lead Role (Drama)	Nominated	
Golden Screen Awards	2005	I Will Survive	Best Performance by an Actress in a Lead Role (Musical or Comedy)	Won	
Golden Screen Awards	2007	Inang Yaya	Best Performance by an Actress in a Lead Role (Drama)	Won	
Golden Screen Awards	2008	A Love Story	Best Performance by an Actress in a Lead Role (Drama)	Nominated	
Golden Screen Awards	2011	Maricel Soriano	Movie Icons of Our Time	Won	
Golden Screen Awards	2013	Maricel Soriano	Dekada Award	Won	
Golden Screen Awards	2015	Ang Dalawang Mrs. Real	Outstanding Performance by an Actress in a Drama Program	Won	
	2026	Maricel Soriano	Dekada Award	Won	
Luna Awards	1984	Kaya kong Abutin ang Langit	Best Actress	Nominated	
Luna Awards	1987	Pinulot Ka Lang sa Lupa	Best Actress	Nominated	
Luna Awards	1993	Ikaw pa Lang ang Minahal	Best Actress	Nominated	
Luna Awards	1995	Separada	Best Actress	Nominated	
Luna Awards	1996	Dahas	Best Actress	Nominated	
Luna Awards	1998	Nasaan ang Puso	Best Actress	Won	
Luna Awards	2000	Soltera	Best Actress	Nominated	
Luna Awards	2001	Abandonada	Best Actress	Nominated	
Luna Awards	2002	Mila	Best Actress	Nominated	
Luna Awards	2003	Mano Po	Best Actress	Nominated	
Luna Awards	2004	Filipinas	Best Actress	Won	
Luna Awards	2005	I Will Survive	Best Actress	Nominated	
Luna Awards	2007	Inang Yaya	Best Actress	Nominated	
Luna Awards	2008	A Love Story	Best Actress	Nominated	
Luna Awards	2008	Bahay Kubo: A Pinoy Mano Po	Best Actress	Won	
Luna Awards	2012	Yesterday, Today, Tomorrow	Best Actress	Nominated	
Luna Awards	2024	In His Mother's Eyes	Best Actress	Won	
Manila Film Festival	1974	Alaala Mo, Daigdig Ko	Best Child Actress	Won	
Metro Manila Film Festival	1995	Dahas	Best Actress	Nominated	
Metro Manila Film Festival	1997	Nasaan ang Puso	Best Actress	Won	
Metro Manila Film Festival	1999	Sa Piling ng Aswang	Best Actress	Nominated	
Metro Manila Film Festival	2002	Mano Po	Best Actress	Nominated	
Metro Manila Film Festival	2003	Filipinas	Best Actress	Won	
Metro Manila Film Festival	2007	Bahay Kubo: A Pinoy Mano Po	Best Actress	Won	
Metro Manila Film Festival	2011	Yesterday, Today, Tomorrow	Best Actress	Won	
Metro Manila Film Festival	2013	Girl, Boy, Bakla, Tomboy	Best Actress	Won	
Metro Manila Film Festival	2019	Maricel Soriano	Hall of Fame	Won	
Star Awards for Movies	1987	The Graduates	Movie Actress of the Year	Nominated	
Star Awards for Movies	1988	Pinulot Ka Lang sa Lupa	Movie Actress of the Year	Nominated	
Star Awards for Movies	1989	Babaing Hampaslupa	Movie Actress of the Year	Nominated	
Star Awards for Movies	1992	Dinampot Ka Lang sa Putik	Movie Actress of the Year	Nominated	
Star Awards for Movies	1993	Ikaw Pa Lang ang Minahal	Movie Actress of the Year	Nominated	
Star Awards for Movies	1995	Separada	Movie Actress of the Year	Won	
Star Awards for Movies	1996	Dahas	Movie Actress of the Year	Nominated	
Star Awards for Movies	1997	Abot Kamay ang Pangarap	Movie Actress of the Year	Nominated	
Star Awards for Movies	1998	Nasaan ang Puso	Movie Actress of the Year	Nominated	
Star Awards for Movies	2000	Soltera	Movie Actress of the Year	Nominated	
Star Awards for Movies	2001	Abandonada	Movie Actress of the Year	Nominated	
Star Awards for Movies	2002	Mila	Movie Actress of the Year	Nominated	
Star Awards for Movies	2003	Mano Po	Movie Actress of the Year	Nominated	
Star Awards for Movies	2004	Filipinas	Movie Actress of the Year	Nominated	
Star Awards for Movies	2007	Inang Yaya	Movie Actress of the Year	Nominated	
Star Awards for Movies	2008	A Love Story	Movie Actress of the Year	Nominated	
Star Awards for Movies	2014	Girl, Boy, Bakla, Tomboy	Movie Supporting Actress of the Year	Nominated	
Star Awards for Movies	2024	In His Mother's Eyes	Movie Actress of the Year (Note: triple tied with Nora Aunor and Vilma Santos)	Won	
	2026	Meet, Greet & Bye	Movie Ensemble Acting of the Year	Won	
	2026	Meet, Greet & Bye	Movie Actress of the Year	Won	
Star Awards for Television	1988	Maricel Regal Drama Special	Best Drama Actress	Won	
Star Awards for Television	1989	Maricel Regal Drama Special	Best Drama Actress	Won	
Star Awards for Television	1991	The Maricel Soriano Drama Special	Best Drama Actress	Nominated	
Star Awards for Television	1996	The Maricel Soriano Drama Special	Best Drama Actress	Nominated	
Star Awards for Television	1997	The Maricel Soriano Drama Special	Best Drama Actress	Won	
Star Awards for Television	1998	Kaya ni Mister, Kaya ni Misis	Best Comedy Actress	Nominated	
Star Awards for Television	1999	Kaya ni Mister, Kaya ni Misis	Best Comedy Actress	Nominated	
Star Awards for Television	2003	Bida si Mister, Bida si Misis	Best Comedy Actress	Nominated	
Star Awards for Television	2003	Maalaala Mo Kaya: "Sing-Along Bar"	Best Single Performance by an Actress	Nominated	
Star Awards for Television	2006	Vietnam Rose	Best Drama Actress	Won	
Star Awards for Television	2007	John en Shirley	Best Comedy Actress	Nominated	
Star Awards for Television	2008	John en Shirley	Best Comedy Actress	Nominated	
Star Awards for Television	2010	Florinda	Best Drama Actress	Won	
Star Awards for Television	2010	5 Star Special Presents	Best Single Performance by an Actress	Nominated	
Star Awards for Television	2012	Untold Stories: "Baldadong Puso"	Best Single Performance by an Actress	Nominated	
Star Awards for Television	2014	Eat Bulaga!: "Kulungan Kanlungan"	Best Single Performance by an Actress	Nominated	
Star Awards for Television	2014	Ang Dalawang Mrs. Real	Best Drama Actress	Nominated	
Star Awards for Television	2016	Maricel Soriano	Ading Fernando Lifetime Achievement Award	Won	
Star Awards for Television	2017	Maalaala Mo Kaya: "Baso"	Best Single Performance by an Actress	Won	
Star Awards for Television	2019	The General's Daughter	Best Drama Supporting Actress	Nominated	
Star Awards for Television	2023	Ang sa Iyo ay Akin	Best Drama Supporting Actress	Nominated	
Star Awards for Television	2025	Pira-Pirasong Paraiso	Best Drama Supporting Actress	Nominated	
Star Awards for Television	2025	Lavender Fields	Best Drama Supporting Actress	Nominated	
Star Awards for Television	2025	3 in 1	Best Comedy Actress	Won	
The EDDYS	2018	Maricel Soriano	Icon Award	Won	
The EDDYS	2024	In His Mother's Eyes	Best Actress	Nominated	
	2026	Meet, Greet & Bye	Box Office Hero	Won	
Young Critics Circle	1992	Dinampot ka Lang sa Putik	Best Performance by Male or Female, Adult or Child, Individual or Ensemble in Leading or Supporting Role	Nominated	
Young Critics Circle	1993	Ikaw Pa Lang ang Minahal	Best Performance by Male or Female, Adult or Child, Individual or Ensemble in Leading or Supporting Role	Won	
Young Critics Circle	1995	Separada	Best Performance by Male or Female, Adult or Child, Individual or Ensemble in Leading or Supporting Role	Nominated	
Young Critics Circle	1995	Vampira	Best Performance by Male or Female, Adult or Child, Individual or Ensemble in Leading or Supporting Role	Won	
Young Critics Circle	1996	Dahas	Best Performance by Male or Female, Adult or Child, Individual or Ensemble in Leading or Supporting Role	Nominated	
Young Critics Circle	1998	Minsan Lamang Magmamahal	Best Performance by Male or Female, Adult or Child, Individual or Ensemble in Leading or Supporting Role	Nominated	
Young Critics Circle	2004	Filipinas	Best Performance by Male or Female, Adult or Child, Individual or Ensemble in Leading or Supporting Role	Nominated	
Young Critics Circle	2007	Inang Yaya	Best Performance by Male or Female, Adult or Child, Individual or Ensemble in Leading or Supporting Role	Won	

== Other accolades ==
=== Listicles ===
Name of publisher, name of listicle, year(s) listed, and placement result
Publisher	Listicle	Year(s)	Result	Ref.
Directors’ Guild of the Philippines Inc.	15 Best Filipino Actresses of All Time	2004	Placed	
Manila Standard	Top 10 Actresses of the Decade (1990s)	1999	Placed	
Philippine Entertainment Portal	15 Greatest Movie Actresses in Leading Roles, 2000-2020	2021	No. 4	
Preview Magazine	Best Dressed of the Year	2009	No. 1	
S Magazine	Philippine Cinema’s 15 Best Actresses of All Time	2006	No. 9	
Yes! Magazine	100 Most Beautiful Stars	2008	Placed	
Yes! Magazine	100 Most Beautiful Stars	2009	Placed	

=== Honors ===
Organization	Year	Award	Ref.
Eastwood City Walk of Fame	2006	Inductee	
Film Development Council of the Philippines	2019	Loveteam of the Century (Note: with William Martinez.)	
Film Development Council of the Philippines	2019	Philippine Cinema Icons: Best Actress	

=== Minor accolades ===
Awards and nominations received by Maricel Soriano
Organizations	Year	Recipient(s)	Category	Result	Ref(s).
EdukCircle Awards	2018	Maalaala Mo Kaya (Episode: "Baso")	Best Actress in a Single Drama Performance)	Won	
Gawad Dangal Filipino Awards	2022	Maricel Soriano	Outstanding Movie Queen and Best Drama Actress of the Year	Won	
Gawad Dangal Filipino Awards	2024	In His Mother's Eyes	Best Actress	Won	
	2026	Meet, Greet & Bye	Box Office Queen and Best Actress	Won	
GEMS Hiyas ng Sining	2021	Ang sa Iyo Ay Akin	Best Performance in a Supporting Role (Male or Female – TV Series)	Won	
Jeepney TV Fan Favorite Awards	2022	Maricel Soriano	The Dolphy Award for Fave Female Comedian	Won	
OFW Gawad Parangal	2015	Ang Dalawang Mrs. Real	Best Actress	Won	
Outstanding Men and Women Awards	2022	Maricel Soriano	Woman Icon Award	Won	
Platinum Stallion Media Awards	2019	Maricel Soriano	Trinitian Media Practitioner for Film	Won	
Rising Tiger Magazine Awards	2023	Maricel Soriano	Women of Excellence	Won	
Star Awards for Movies	2003	Maricel Soriano	Star of the Night	Won	
YES! Readers' Choice Awards	2003	Maricel Soriano	Actress of the Year	Won	
YES! Readers' Choice Awards	2003	Maricel Soriano	Most Popular Female Star	Won	
YES! Readers' Choice Awards	2004	Maricel Soriano	Most Popular Female Star	Won	
YES! Readers' Choice Awards	2004	Maricel Soriano	Actress of the Year	Won	
YES! Readers' Choice Awards	2005	Maricel Soriano	Actress of the Year	Won	
YES! Readers' Choice Awards	2005	Maricel Soriano	Most Popular Female Star	Won	
YES! Readers' Choice Awards	2006	Maricel Soriano	Actress of the Year Hall of Fame	Won	
YES! Readers' Choice Awards	2006	Maricel Soriano	Most Popular Female Star Hall of Fame	Won	
YES! Readers' Choice Awards	2006	Maricel Soriano	Scene Stealer of the Year	Won	
YES! Readers' Choice Awards	2006	Maricel Soriano	Most Beautiful Celebrity	Won	
YES! Readers' Choice Awards	2006	Maricel Soriano	Most Popular Female Star	Won	
YES! Readers' Choice Awards	2008	Maricel Soriano	Favorite Actress of the Year	Won	
YouTube	2022	Maricel Marya Channel	Silver Play Button Award	Won	

=== Media citations ===
Organizations	Citation(s)	Year(s)	Ref(s).
Tatler Asia	Best Actress of her generation	2022	
ABS-CBN	Queen of Philippine Romantic Comedy	2022	
ABS-CBN	Drama Anthology Queen	2020	
Inquirer	Movie Queen	2019	
Khaleej Times	Highest Paid Actress in Philippine Movies	2006	
Manila Standard	Third highest paid celebrity endorser (₱10 million for Jollibee)	1999	
Manila Standard	No. 1 Regal Star	1987	
Manila Standard	The Box-Office Queen	1988, 1994-1996	
Manila Standard	Drama Queen on television	1995	
