= 2008 Box Office Entertainment Awards =

Annual Philippine entertainment awards

- Date: May 13, 2008
- Location: Manila

The 38th Guillermo Mendoza Memorial Scholarship Foundation Box Office Entertainment Awards (GMMSF-BOEA) is a part of the annual awards in the Philippines held on May 13, 2008. The award-giving body honors Filipino actors, actresses and other performers' commercial success, regardless of artistic merit, in the Philippine entertainment industry.

== Winners selection ==
The winners are chosen from the Top 10 Philippine films of 2007, top-rating shows in Philippine television, top recording awards received by singers, and top gross receipts of concerts and performances.

== Awards ceremony ==
On May 13, 2008 at RCBC Plaza, Ayala Avenue in Makati, Philippines, the 38th Box Office Entertainment Awards night was held. The event was aired on May 17, 7pm at NBN 4 - Net 25.

Hosts of the night

- Kim Chiu and Gabby Concepcion

Presenters and performers

- Bea Saw and AJ Dee
- Makisig Morales
- John Wayne Sace and Alex Gonzaga
- Robert Woods and Saicy Aguila
- Gian Magdangal
- Aicelle Santos
- Erich Gonzales and Mike Tan
- Sitti
- Dino Imperial and Bangs Garcia
- Railey Valeroso and Chynna Ortaleza
- Sarah Geronimo
- Gian Magdangal
- Matt Evans and Melissa Ricks
- Martin Nievera
- Paolo Paraiso and Say Alonzo
- Gerald Anderson and Kim Chiu
- Rodjun Cruz and Megan Young
- John Lloyd Cruz and Bea Alonzo
- Dolphy

Faces of the night

- Marian Rivera and Aga Muhlach

=== Awards ===
==== Major awards ====
- Box Office King - John Lloyd Cruz (One More Chance)
- Box Office Queen - Bea Alonzo (One More Chance)
- Male Concert Performer of the Year - Martin Nievera
- Female Concert Performer of the Year - Sarah Geronimo
- Male Recording Artist of the Year - Piolo Pascual
- Female Recording Artist of the Year - Sitti

==== Film and Television category ====
- Film Actor of the Year - Aga Muhlach (A Love Story)
- Film Actress of the Year - Maricel Soriano (A Love Story)
- Prince of Philippine Movies - Richard Gutierrez (The Promise)
- Princess of Philippine Movies - Angel Locsin (The Promise)
- Most Popular Film Producer - Star Cinema
- Most Popular Screenwriter - Carmi Raymundo & Vanessa Valdez (One More Chance)
- Most Popular Film Director - Cathy Garcia Molina (One More Chance)
- Most Promising Male Star - Mart Escudero (GMA-7)
- Most Promising Female Star - Marian Rivera (GMA-7)
- Most Popular Loveteam of RP Movies & TV - Gerald Anderson & Kim Chiu (ABS-CBN)
- Most Popular Male Child Performer - Makisig Morales (ABS-CBN)
- Most Popular Female Child Performer - Kiray Celis (ABS-CBN)
- Most Popular TV Program - Marimar (GMA-7)
- Most Popular TV Director/s - Joyce Bernal & Mac Alejandre (Marimar - GMA-7)

==== Music category ====
- Most Promising Male Singer - Gian Magdangal
- Most Promising Female Singer - Aicelle Santos
- Most Popular Recording Group - Bamboo
- Most Promising Recording Group - Calla Lily
- Most Popular Novelty Singer - Joey de Leon
- Most Popular Dance Group - EB Babes

=== Special awards ===
- Phenomenal TV Star - Marian Rivera
- All Time Box Office King - Vic Sotto (four-time consecutive Box Office King from 2004 to 2007)
- King of Valentine Movies - Richard Gutierrez (4 consecutive years playing the male lead role in four Valentine movies)
- Outstanding Achievement by a Female Recording Artist - Sharon Cuneta (Isn't It Romantic 2 album reached double platinum status on its release)

== Multiple Awards ==
=== Companies with multiple awards ===
The following companies received two or more awards in the television category:

Awards	Company
4	ABS-CBN
3	GMA-7
