= 2007 FAMAS Awards =

Annual Filipino film awards ceremony

56th FAMAS Awards
- Date: Sunday, November 25, 2007
- Site: Le Pavilion, Function Place, Metrobank Park, Diosdado Macapagal Boulevard, Pasay

Highlights
- Best Picture: Kasal, Kasali, Kasalo
- Most awards: Kasal, Kasali, Kasalo (9)
- Most nominations: Kasal, Kasali, Kasalo (12)

The 56th Filipino Academy of Movie Arts and Sciences Awards Night was held on November 25, 2007 at Le Pavilion, Function Place, Metrobank Park, Diosdado Macapagal Boulevard, Pasay.

Kasal, Kasali, Kasalo, produced by Malou Santos & Charo Santos-Concio, is the recipient of this edition's FAMAS Award for Best Picture.

== Awards ==
=== Major Awards ===
Winners are listed first and highlighted with boldface.

Best Picture	Best Director
**Kasal, Kasali, Kasalo — Malou Santos, Charo Santos-Concio**; Inang Yaya — Maricel Soriano, Wyngard Tracy; Summer Heat — Arlene L. Sy; Kubrador — Joji Alonso; Umaaraw, Umuulan — Harlene Bautista, Hero Bautista	**Jose Javier Reyes — Kasal, Kasali, Kasalo**; Joyce Bernal — Don't Give Up on Us; Pablo Biglang-Awa, Veronica Velasco — Inang Yaya; Jeffrey Jeturian — Kubrador; Brilliante Mendoza — Summer Heat
Best Actor	Best Actress
**Cesar Montano — Ligalig**; Ryan Agoncillo — Umaaraw, Umuulan; Johnny Delgado — Summer Heat; Piolo Pascual — Don't Give Up on Us; Jericho Rosales — Pacquiao: The Movie	**Judy Ann Santos — Kasal, Kasali, Kasalo**; Claudine Barretto — Sukob; Gina Pareño — Kubrador; Cherry Pie Picache — Summer Heat; Maricel Soriano — Inang Yaya
Best Supporting Actor	Best Supporting Actress
**Allen Dizon — Twilight Dancers**; Tommy Abuel — Don't Give Up on Us; Jimmy Concepcion — Barang; Allan Paule — Summer Heat; Wendell Ramos — Sukob	**Gina Pareño — Kasal, Kasali, Kasalo**; Tetchie Agbayani — Close to You; Rio Locsin — Don't Give Up on Us; Liza Lorena — Barang; Maja Salvador — Sukob
Best Child Actor	Best Child Actress
**Christian Luis Singson — Barang**; Rex Dimaguiba — Close to You; Aaron Junatas — Donsol; Abijah Sarmienta — Umaaraw, Umuulan; Jessie Trinidad — Inang Yaya	**Tala Santos — Inang Yaya**; Anna Marie Gallo — Close to You; Loida Manuel — Sukob; Zeke Sarmienta — Umaaraw, Umuulan
Best Screenplay	Best Cinematography
**Jose Javier Reyes — Kasal, Kasali, Kasalo**; Veronica Velasco — Inang Yaya; Dindo Perez — Don't Give Up on Us	**Eli Balce — Donsol**; Odyssey Flores — Summer Heat; Gary Gardoce — Inang Yaya; Charlie Peralta — Don't Give Up on Us; Monchie Redoble — Kasal, Kasali, Kasalo
Best Art Direction	Best Sound
**Raymond Bajarias — Sukob**; Gessan Enriquez — Donsol; Dante Nico Garcia — Don't Give Up on Us; Benjamin Padero — Summer Heat; Willy Urbino — Kasal, Kasali, Kasalo	**Albert Michael Idioma — Sukob**; Richard Arellano — Umaaraw, Umuulan; Lamberto Casas, Jr. — You Are the One; Albert Michael Idioma — Kasal, Kasali, Kasalo; Addiss Tabong — Don't Give Up on Us
Best Editing	Best Special Effects
**Vito Cajili — Kasal, Kasali, Kasalo**; Philip Espina — Summer Heat; Randy Gabriel — Inang Yaya; Jay Halili — Kubrador; Marya Ignacio — Don't Give Up on Us	**Peping Carmona — Sukob**; Roland Salem — Sa Ilalim ng Cogon
Best Visual Effects	Best Story
**Larger than Life — Ligalig**; Rey Ariestain — Barang; Emil Guinto — Umaaraw, Umuulan	**Jose Javier Reyes — Kasal, Kasali, Kasalo**; Ralston Jover — Kubrador; Brilliante Mendoza, Boots Pastor — Summer Heat; Nick Joseph Olanka — Huling Araw ng Linggo; Veronica Velasco — Inang Yaya
Best Theme Song	Best Musical Score
**"Hawak Kamay" — Kasal, Kasali, Kasalo (Yeng Constantino)**; "Bukas Muli" — Summer Heat (Romy Guinoo); "Nanay" — Inang Yaya (Joey Benn); "Umaaraw, Umuulan" — Umaaraw, Umuulan (Rivermaya); "Walang Hanggang Paalam" — Donsol (Joey Ayala)	**Jesse Lucas — Kasal, Kasali, Kasalo**; Nonong Buencamino — Inang Yaya; Jesse Lucas — Donsol; Raul Mitra — Don't Give Up On Us; Alfredo Ongleo — Umaaraw, Umuulan

=== Special awards ===
**Filipino Academy of Movie Arts and Sciences Grand Award**

- German Moreno

**Atty. Flavio G. Macaso Memorial Award**

- Larry Dominguez

**Dr. Jose Perez Memorial Award for Journalism**

- Ernie Pecho

**Fernando Poe, Jr. Memorial Award**

- Rudy Fernandez

**German Moreno Youth Achievement Award**

- JC de Vera
- Maja Salvador

**Golden Artist Award**

- Jolina Magdangal

**International Artist Award**

- Billy Crawford

**Presidential Award**

- Robert Rivera

**Posthumous Award**

- Ramon Zamora

**Lifetime Achievement Award**

- Celso Ad. Castillo
- Gloria Sevilla

**Special Citation**

- Vic del Rosario, Jr. [Movie Production]
