= Mel Martinez (actor) =

Filipino film and television actor

- Born: Meliton Dador Martinez; November 13, 1974 (age 51); Manila, Philippines
- Occupation: Actor
- Years active: 1987–present
- Relatives: Maricel Soriano (half-sister); Meryll Soriano (niece); Mickey Martinez (brother); Becbec Soriano (half-sister)

Meliton Dador Martinez (born November 13, 1974) is a Filipino film and television actor. He is the half-brother of actress Maricel Soriano, and the uncle of Meryll Soriano.

== Filmography ==
=== Film ===
- Batang Quiapo (1986) - Totoy
- TOPAK (1987–1992)
- Bunsong Kerubin (1987) - Avelino
- Kid, Huwag kang Susuko (1987)
- Rosa Mistica (1988)
- Love Letters (1988)
- Super Inday and the Golden Bibe (1988)
- Estudyante Blues (1989) - Mel
- Teacher's Enemy No. 1 (1990)
- Rocky 'N Rolly: Suntok Sabay Takbo (1990)
- Bikining Itim (1990) - Apeng
- Wooly Booly 2: Ang Titser Kong Alien (1990)
- T.O.P.A.K. (1993–1998)
- Tom & Jerry: Hindi Kaming Hayop (1993) - Jerry
- Johnny Guess: Ang Taong Laging Nagtatanong (1994) - Jun-Jun
- Wala Na Bang Pag-ibig (1997)
- Muling ibalik ang tamis ng Pag-ibig (1998) - Donita
- Ikaw Lamang (1999)
- Still Lives (1999) - Camille
- Annie B. (2004)
- House Da Riles (2004–2005)
- Roxxxane (2007) - Valenne
- Maling Akala (2007)
- Momzillas (2013)
- Die Beautiful (2016)
- D' Aswang Slayerz (2023)

=== Television ===
Year	Title	Role	Notes
1999–2001	Marinella	Artemio "Tembong" Panganiban	Recurring Role
2001	!Oka Tokat	Jigs	Guest Role, later Main Role
2001–2002	Ikaw Lang ang Mamahalin	Finky	Supporting Role
2004	Marinara	Syoque	Supporting Role
2007	Princess Charming	Sushmita	Supporting Role
2008	Sine Novela: Una Kang Naging Akin	Eli Solis	Supporting Role
2009	Maalaala Mo Kaya	Babot Viceral	Episode: "Bola"
2009	Dear Friend: Kay Tagal Kitang Hinintay	Samsara	Supporting Role / Protagonist
2010	Pepito Manaloto	June	Guest Role
2010	Rubi	Loretto Valiente	Supporting Role
2010	Wansapanataym	Venus	Episode: "Inday Sa Balitaw"
2011	Mga Nagbabagang Bulaklak	Magnolia	Supporting Role
2011	Iglot	Rica	Supporting Role
2011	Spooky Nights: Short Time of My Life	Vilma	Main Role
2012–2013	Temptation of Wife	Pat	Recurring Role / Protagonist
2014–2016	The Half Sisters	Venus Mercado	Supporting Role / Protagonist
2016	Naku, Boss Ko!	Hanash	Guest Role
2016	Dear Uge	Danica	Guest Role
2016–2018	Ika-6 na Utos	Zeny	Supporting Role / Anti-Hero
2018	Tadhana	Mark	Episode: "Tunay na Ina"
2019	Kadenang Ginto	Joaquin "Wacky" Dumagat	Guest Role / Protagonist
2019	FPJ's Ang Probinsyano	Mamu	Guest Role / Antagonist
2020–2021	Paano ang Pangako?	Tamisha	Supporting Role
2022	Daig Kayo ng Lola Ko	Mang Igme	Episode: "Tiki Toktok"
2023	Wish Ko Lang!		Episode: "Palo"
2025	Mommy Dearest	Wiro Sales	Supporting Role
2025	Sins of the Father	Valentino "Love" Narciso	
2026	The Master Cutter		
