= St. Mary's Academy of Pasay =

Roman Catholic school in Pasay, Philippines

- Akademyang Santa Maria ng Pasay (Filipino)
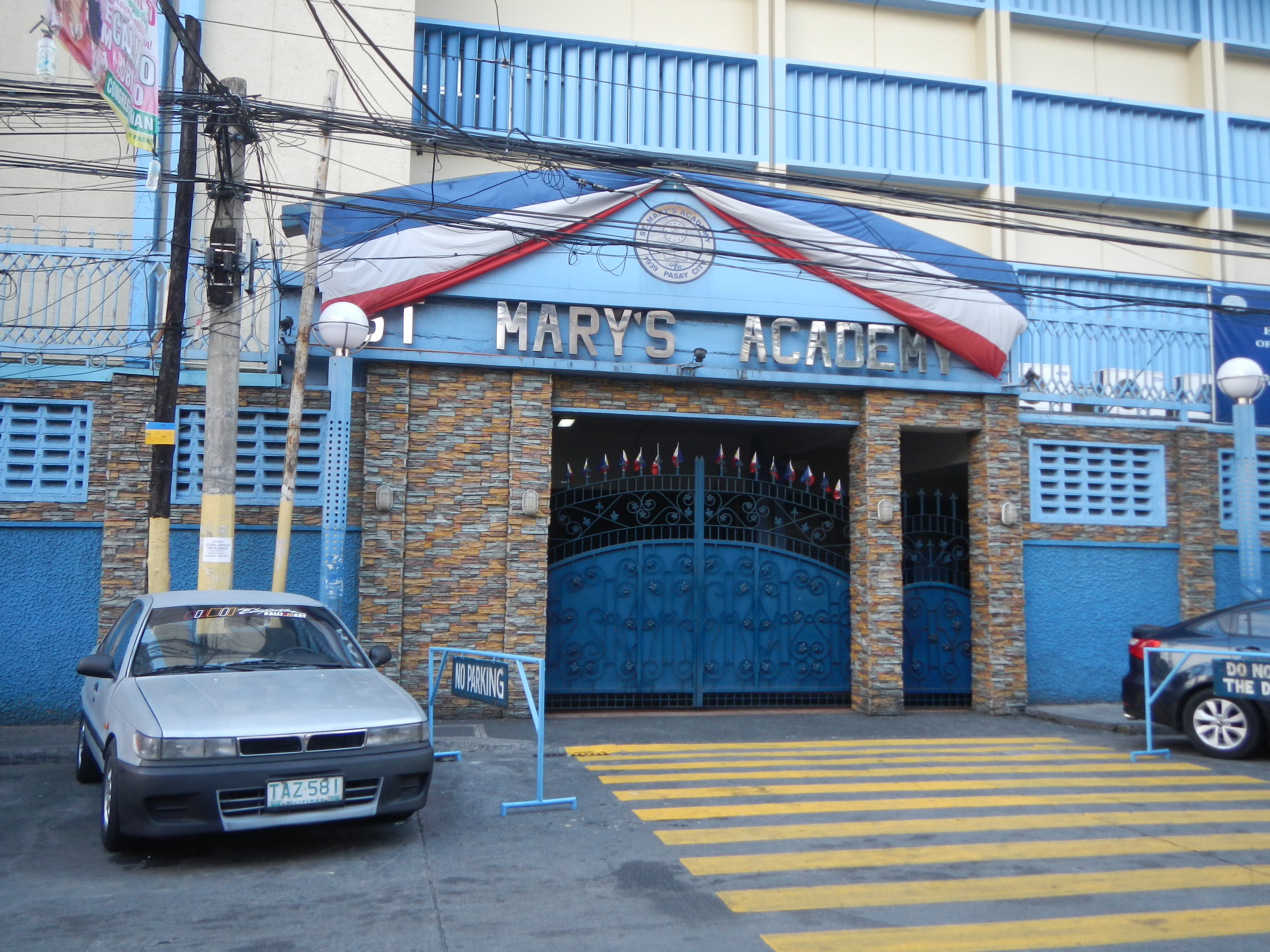
- School gate and facade in 2016

Location
- 525 Padre Burgos Street, Barangay 59, Pasay City, Metro Manila; Philippines
- Coordinates: 14°32′55″N 121°00′00″E

Information
- Former name: Escuela Catolica de Pasay (1922-1939)
- Type: Private RVM Roman Catholic Coeducational Basic education institution
- Motto: Latin: Initium Sapientiae Timor Domini; English: The fear of the Lord is the beginning of wisdom.
- Religious affiliation: Roman Catholic (RVM Sisters)
- Established: 1922; 104 years ago
- Enrollment: approx. 3,000 Marians
- Campus: Urban
- Colors: Blue and White
- Athletics conference: PCADM
- Sports: Varsity sports teams: Basketball, Volleyball, Badminton, Table tennis, Taekwondo, Aikido
- Nickname: Marian
- Affiliation: CEAP; RVM-EAP; PC PRISA
- Alma Mater song: "Hail Saint Mary's.." "The School We Love.."
- Patroness: Blessed Virgin Mary
- Website: sma.edu.ph

St. Mary's Academy of Pasay, also known by its acronyms SMA and SMA-P, is a private, Catholic co-educational basic education institution run by the Religious of the Virgin Mary in Pasay, Metro Manila, Philippines. It was established as the “Escuela Catolica de Pasay” in 1922 by a parish priest, Rev. Fr. Egmidio Trinidad.

== History ==
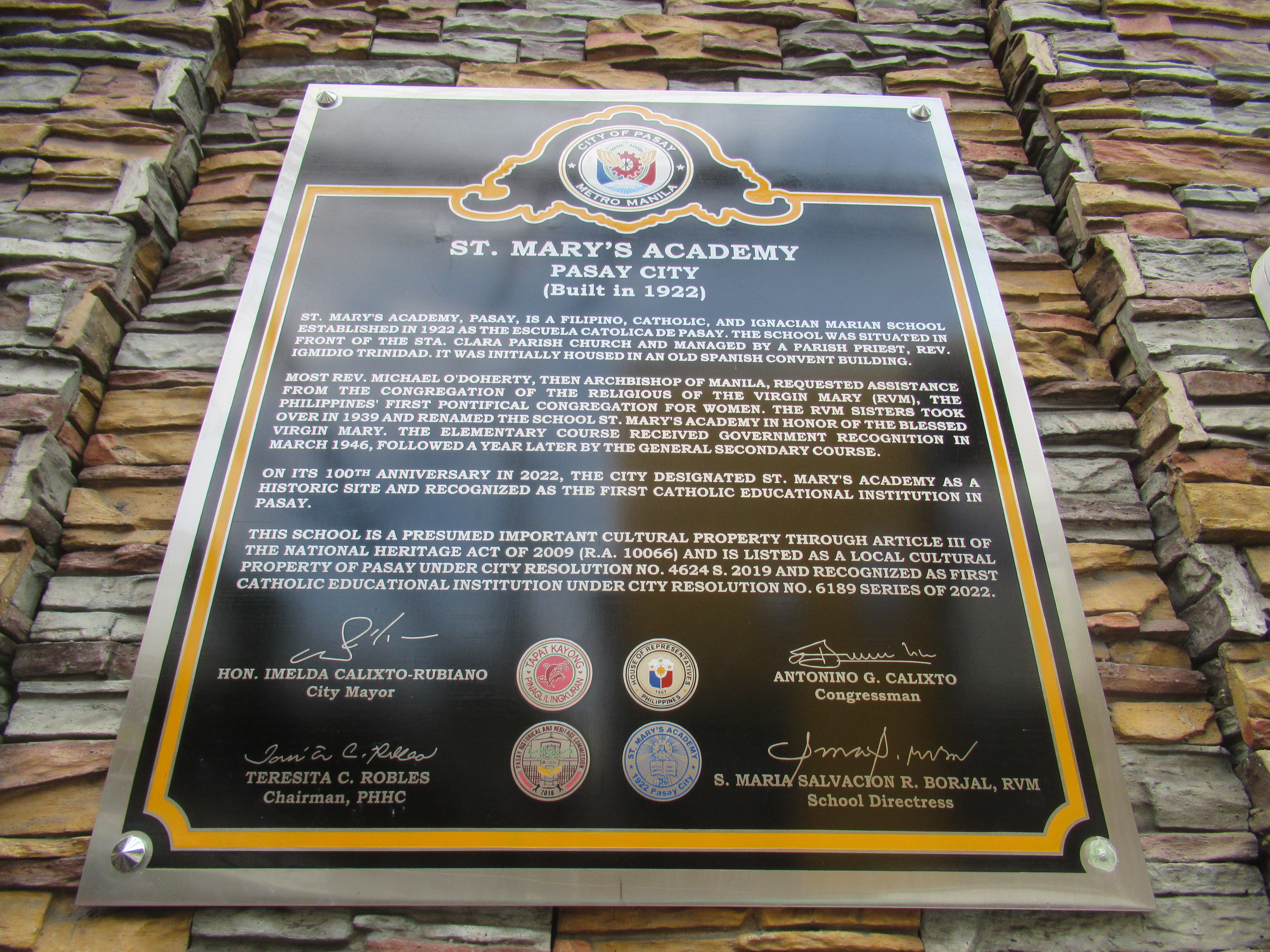
School marker

In 1922, St. Mary's Academy was established as the “Escuela Catolica de Pasay”, managed by the parish priest, Rev. Fr. Egmidio Trinidad. In its infancy, St. Mary's offered Primary Level instruction, from 1922 to 1939. in 1939, the Archbishop of Manila, the Most Reverend Michael O’Doherty, turned the school's management over to the RVM Sisters. The following year, "Escuela Catolica de Pasay," was officially renamed as "St. Mary's Academy, during the tenure of the first superior of the school, Mother Maria Josefa Avendaño. The school's new name—St. Mary’s Academy—honors the school's patroness, the Blessed Virgin Mary.

In March 1946, the School's Elementary Course was recognized by the government, leading to the commencement of the school's General Secondary Course the following year.

In 1947, the school presented its first 10 high school graduates with their certificates of graduation.

Today, St. Mary's Academy provides education in the levels of Kindergarten, grade school, high school, and senior high school curricula for boys and girls. It also provides vocational education via MICHD or Mother Ignacia Center for Human Development.

== Management ==
St. Mary’s Academy is run by the Religious of the Virgin Mary or "RVM" which is the Philippines' first pontifical Filipino Congregation for women, founded in 1684 by a Filipina, Venerable Ignacia del Espiritu Santo. St. Mary’s Academy started as an all-girls' school, and later became co-educational.

== School symbols ==
St. Mary's Academy was renamed in 1939, in honor of the Blessed Virgin Mary, from its original name "Escuela Catolica de Pasay". The new name symbolizes the virtues of Mary, the mother of Jesus, and also that of the venerable Ignacia del Espiritu Santo. The school motto is "Initium sapientiae timor domini" meaning "The fear of The Lord is the beginning of wisdom".

=== Athletic facilities ===
St. Mary's Academy Gymnasium - This facility is used for sports events, and also for practices of the basketball, volleyball, badminton, table tennis (separated in a room - HS) varsity teams and sometimes for socialization activities.

- St. Mary's Academy Grade School Gymnasium (For Pre-school & Intermediate levels only)
- St. Mary's Academy High School Gymnasium (For High School students only)

=== Quadrangle ===
St. Mary's Academy Quadrangle located in the center of the school, and within full view from classrooms, is the venue for major events such as Family Day, intramurals, sport events, practices & P.E classes, community day, flag ceremony (by level) and a lot more.

=== Educational facilities ===
St. Mary's Academy has eight major buildings that house Pre-school, Grade School, High School, and vocational students.

- St. Therese Building
- St. Joseph Building
- Holy Child Building
- Marian building
- Sacred Heart Building
- Assumption Building
- MIDES building
- MICHD building

=== Libraries ===
St. Mary's Academy has two libraries, one for the grade school department and the other for the high school department, each equipped with an Internet Station.

=== Laboratories ===
The Grade School Department has a total of seven laboratories: two science laboratories, one Art laboratory, one H.E.L.E. laboratory, two Computer laboratories.

The school has two Model House used for home economic classes, and for other special purposes.

The High School Department has four laboratories for general science, Physics, Biology, Chemistry, Physical science. It has one Computer laboratory, one T.L.E.

Aside from the Model House, St. Mary's has a sewing laboratory, used by both grade school and high school students.

The school has two Speech laboratories, one for grade school department and the other for the high school department. It is used during English class by students of both departments.

=== Chapel ===
For the grade school department, they have one prayer room, though it is not often used by the students.

=== Auditorium ===
It is used for graduations, presentations per class, activities, socialization.

=== Health Center ===
Since the old health center was small, it was moved to a much bigger room in the Assumption building. It contains beds, seats, main desk, dental office, doctor's office, restrooms, and crucifixes and a few more.

=== Archives ===
It contains old documents, pictures, school's newspaper, magazines and other historic data and documents connected to the school.

=== Museum ===
Located at the Centennial Bridge, You can see old pictures of the school and it explains the history of St. Mary's Academy Pasay. It also contains a miniature replica of the buildings of St. Mary's Academy – Pasay.

=== Sports ===
The school also has varsity teams, which represents the school in local, regional and national level athletic competitions such as Basketball, Swimming, Badminton, Volleyball, Taekwondo, Dance Sport and Table Tennis. The school competes in the Pasay City Athletic Division Meet and the Pasay City Private School Association. The varsity teams of St. Mary's hold many championships titles in different fields of sports from both local or regional competitions.

=== Marian Student Government (MSG) ===
The Marian Student Government helps and disciplines the students of the High School Department. They also make project proposals for the benefit of the school especially in the High School Department. The Marian Student Government is a member of the Pasay City Youth Development Council together with its other student council counterparts in Pasay. The organization is also a core member of the Catholic Educational Association of the Philippines in which they are the delegates representing St. Mary's academy - Pasay together with other student councils throughout the country.

The officers of the Marian Student Government are voted by the students of the High School Department . In the High School Department the elected officers will represent the Grade 7-12 students.

=== Marian Graders Barangayette (MGB) ===
The counterpart of Marian Student Government (MSG) in Grade School is the Marian Graders Barangayette. The Grade School Department elected officers represent the Grade 1-6 students. The Student Council helps to discipline the students. They are also responsible in promoting the cleanliness of the surroundings of the Grade School area.

== Affiliated organizations ==
=== St. Mary's Academy Pasay Alumni Association (SMAP-AA) ===
They are in-charge of the events concerning to the alumni of St. Mary's Academy – Pasay. They are also in-charge of the Alumni League, an annual sports fest for the former students of St. Mary's. They are grouped according to their school's batch year of graduation. They are also the ones who ae in-charge of the distribution of St. Mary's Academy – Pasay Alumni Cards exclusive only for alumni of SMA-P.

=== St. Mary's Academy Parents' Auxiliary (SMAPA) ===
It is an organization of parents of the students of St. Mary's concerning to the program of school. They are in the partnership with the school's administration. They are also the one who assist and plan events for the school including the Family Day, and/or the annual SMA-P Fun Run.

=== St. Mary's Operators, Drivers, Service Association (SMODSA) ===
An organization for School Service Operators and drivers of St. Mary's Academy – Pasay.

=== Mother Ignacia Center for Human Development (MICHD) ===
Located at the MICHD Building, St. Mary's Academy provides education thru technical or vocational courses.

List of courses offered by MICHD:

- Dressmaking/Tailoring
- Cosmetology
- Typing and Computer
- Hi-Speed Sewing
- Electronics
- Cooking and Home Management

== Notable alumni ==
- Maricel Soriano — actress
- Sharon Cuneta — actress (transferred to another school)
