= Abandonada (film) =

2000 drama film by Joel C. Lamangan

- Official movie poster
- Directed by: Joel Lamangan
- Written by: Raquel Villavicencio
- Produced by: Vincent del Rosario III
- Starring: Maricel Soriano; Edu Manzano; Angelu de Leon
- Cinematography: Monino Duque; Charlie Peralta
- Edited by: Tara Illenberger
- Music by: Jessie Lasaten
- Production company: Viva Films
- Distributed by: Viva Films
- Release date: November 29, 2000
- Running time: 100 minutes
- Country: Philippines
- Language: Filipino

Abandonada (transl. Abandoned or Abandoned Woman) is a 2000 Philippine drama film directed by Joel Lamangan. The film stars Maricel Soriano, Edu Manzano and Angelu de Leon.

This is Edu Manzano and Maricel Soriano’s fifth film and first film as a onscreen pair for Viva Films.

== Plot ==
Gemma migrates to Canada to support her husband Edwin and newborn son Marco. Working as a nurse, she is jailed for two years and ultimately deported for fatally overdosing a terminally ill young patient in an act of mercy. Upon returning to the Philippines, she finds that Edwin had left her and taken along Marco while telling everyone that she had died abroad.

Gemma tracks down Edwin and Marco to an affluent neighborhood in Manila, where he has married an unsuspecting socialite named Cindy for her money and has an infant daughter with her named Abby, while passing off Marco as his nephew. In order to get closer to her son and confront Edwin, she applies as a laundrywoman and a nanny for Marco under the name Malou. Edwin is shocked to see Gemma, but ignores her. Gemma endears herself to Marco, protecting him from his abusive and lecherous nanny Glo. Gemma also gains the trust and trust of Cindy and the other maids when she defends Abby and her nanny Rose from Glo when the latter tries to fatally stab them during an argument.

While rummaging through Gemma's things, Myrna, a kleptomaniac coworker, finds pictures of her and Edwin as a married couple. Gemma then comes clean about her past to her coworkers and gains their support in taking back custody of Marco. While Cindy is away, Gemma confronts Edwin for his deeds, upon which he agrees to let Gemma take custody of Marco and make it appear that he was abducted by someone else.

On the night of Gemma and Marco's escape, in which she is helped by her boyfriend Nando, they are engaged in a high-speed chase and shootout by Edwin, who feigned agreement to Gemma's wishes in order to lure her into a trap and kill her. The trio end up hiding inside a cinema but are spotted by Edwin, leading to a shootout in which Edwin kills Nando and prepares to shoot Gemma when police arrive. Edwin instead frames Gemma for abducting Marco and has her arrested. As Gemma is led away into custody she screams for her son in front of television cameras and Cindy.

In jail, Gemma reveals to an unbelieving Cindy that she is Edwin's legal wife and Marco's mother. Cindy is later convinced of the truth after the maids show her Gemma and Edwin's pictures, which she had left behind. Cindy confronts Edwin and leaves him. She then tells Marco about her real mother and reunites him with a grateful Gemma, while dropping all charges against her. Cindy migrates to the United States along with Abby and cuts Edwin off financially while she files for divorce. As Edwin is evicted from Cindy's house, he is arrested by police for Nando's murder. As he is taken into custody, a newly-released Gemma arrives and slaps him. Gemma pays his respects at Nando's grave and leaves with Marco for the province to start a new life.

== Cast ==
Main cast

- Maricel Soriano as Gemma
- Edu Manzano as Edwin
- Angelu de Leon as Cindy
- Jay Manalo as Nando

Supporting cast

- Ynez Veneracion as Glo
- Perla Bautista as Manang Bining
- Maureen Mauricio as Rose
- Mel Kimura as Myrna
- Tita de Villa as Remy
- Gigette Reyes as Emily
- Bernard Palanca as Julian
- Jim Pebanco as Jess
- Tony Mabesa as Atty. Mallonca
- King Alcala as Marco
  - Angelo Macam as 1-year old Marco
- Aurora Uding as Landlady
- Ronald Butlig as Nestor
- Jon Romano as Didoy
- Jackie Castillejos as Guia

== Awards ==
Year	Awards	Category	Recipient	Result	Ref.
2001	49th FAMAS Awards	Best Actress	Maricel Soriano	Nominated	
2001	49th FAMAS Awards	Best Supporting Actress	Angelu de Leon	Nominated	
2001	49th FAMAS Awards	Best Child Actor	King Alcala	Nominated	
2001	49th FAMAS Awards	Best Theme Song	Kung Wala Na	Nominated	
2001	19th FAP Awards	Best Picture	Abandonada	Nominated	
2001	19th FAP Awards	Best Original Song	Kung Wala Na	Won	
