= Hinugot sa Langit =

- Directed by: Ishmael Bernal
- Written by: Amado L. Lacuesta Jr.
- Produced by: Lily Y. Monteverde
- Starring: Maricel Soriano
- Cinematography: Rody Lacap
- Edited by: Jess Navarro
- Music by: Willy Cruz
- Production company: Regal Films
- Distributed by: Regal Films
- Release date: June 6, 1985
- Country: Philippines
- Language: Filipino

Hinugot sa Langit (English: Wrenched from Heaven) is a 1985 Philippine melodrama film directed by Ishmael Bernal from a story and screenplay written by Amado L. Lacuesta Jr. A film that tackles issues about abortion, sexuality, and Philippine Catholic society, it revolves around a young woman with an unwanted pregnancy (played by Maricel Soriano) and her decision to consider abortion as the solution to her problem.

Produced and distributed by Regal Films, the film was theatrically released on June 6, 1985. It is considered a classic in Philippine cinema and picked up four Gawad Urian Awards.

== Plot ==
Carmen Castro is a young woman who has an affair with a married man, Gerry, who wants Carmen to abort the baby. She confides to Stella, who tells her to control her own destiny.

== Cast ==
Screenshot featuring Maricel Soriano (right) and Charito Solis (left)

- Maricel Soriano as Carmen Castro
- Al Tantay as Gerry
- Rowell Santiago as Bobby
- Charito Solis as Juling
- Amy Austria as Stella
- Dante Rivero as Dr. Sison
- Susan Africa
- Jaime Asencio
- Vic Jose
- Crispin Medina
- Tony Pascua
- Mario Taguiwalo
- Leticia Tison
- Ray Ventura
- Aurora Yumul

== Soundtrack and cinematography ==
The film won Gawad Urian Awards for Best Direction, Best Editing (Jess Navarro), Best Production Design and Best Sound in 1986.

== See also ==
- Sunshine, a 2024 film by Antoinette Jadaone that also tackles abortion and its dilemma
