= The Maricel Drama Special =

- Title card; courtesy of OPM MTV Video (Remus Archives)
- Genre: Anthology, Drama
- Starring: Maricel Soriano
- Opening theme: "Je suis malade" by Sergei Lama (Pierre Porte version)
- Country of origin: Philippines
- Original language: Filipino
- No. of episodes: 425

Production
- Running time: 90 minutes

Original release
- Network: ABS-CBN
- Release: March 27, 1989 – May 12, 1997

Related
- Maricel Regal Drama Special

The Maricel Drama Special is a Philippine anthology drama series broadcast by ABS-CBN. Starring Maricel Soriano, it aired from March 27, 1989 to May 12, 1997 replacing Maricel Regal Drama Special and was replaced by Kaya ni Mister, Kaya ni Misis.

== See also ==
- List of programs broadcast by ABS-CBN
- Kaya ni Mister, Kaya ni Misis
