= Sige, Subukan Mo =

- Directed by: Francis "Jun" Posadas
- Written by: Joseph Balboa and Francis Posadas
- Screenplay by: Joseph Balboa
- Story by: Joseph Balboa
- Produced by: Lily Y. Monteverde
- Starring: Ace Vergel; Maricel Soriano
- Cinematography: Rey de Leon
- Edited by: Danny Gloria
- Music by: Jaime Fabregas
- Production company: Regal Entertainment
- Distributed by: Regal Entertainment
- Release date: August 5, 1998 (Manila)
- Running time: 110 minutes
- Country: Philippines
- Language: Filipino

Sige, Subukan Mo is a 1998 Filipino action-comedy film co-written by Joseph Balboa and directed by Francis Posadas, starring Ace Vergel and Maricel Soriano.

== Plot ==
David (Ace Vergel) is presented as Congressman Ampil's (Eddie Gutierrez) adopted son and his hitman. He works for his father figure and does what he is told.

Sonya (Maricel Soriano) is a tomboy fishmonger who always carries a balisong. They collide when he accidentally causes Sonya to fall on the creek with the tricycle. She leaves her ledger and he returns it.

He is called Berting by her. When they are ambushed by a rival group, their enemy shoots Sonya's younger sister (Assunta De Rossi). He sends her to the hospital to help his father. There she reveals that her father was killed by Ampil's men in the line of duty. As he learns her secret, his trust in his father slowly slips away. As he tries to reason with his father, the latter denies his request. A mysterious man trudges through a file case and finds a folder.

David goes to retrieve the folder. Although the rival group bribes him to defect, he declines and burns the money. He kills the lawyer and the traitor and retrieves the briefcase. He is later betrayed by his former friends who try to kill him. He survives and hides in Sonya's house. He hides the case and the folder in Sonya's care. They are unsuccessfully attacked by Ampil's men. His sidekick (Christopher Roxas), still loyal to him, warns David of what Ampil would do next. He is spotted by Sonya's little sister as the one she had last seen before she was shot. Sonya becomes furious with David/Berting for lying about his identity. She is captured by Ampil. She is about to be frozen when David emerges. A lengthy firefight ends in a three-way duel between Ampil, David, and the henchman. Ampil and the henchman die.

Sonya and David marry, after several delays and a fallen balisong.

== Cast ==
- Ace Vergel as Berting/David
- Maricel Soriano as Sonya Panyang
- Eddie Gutierrez as Canor Ampil
- Dan Fernandez
- Ruel Vernal
- Orestes Ojeda
- Christopher Roxas as Kit
- Candy Pangilinan
- Daniel Pasia
- Assunta de Rossi as Mabel
- Carlos Padilla Jr. as Kanor
- Candy Pangilinan
- Larry Silva
- John Paul Canero
