= Momzillas =

MomZillas
- Directed by: Wenn V. Deramas
- Screenplay by: Wenn V. Deramas; Keiko Aquino
- Story by: Wenn V. Deramas
- Produced by: Charo Santos-Concio; Malou N. Santos; Vic Del Rosario Jr.
- Starring: Maricel Soriano; Eugene Domingo; Billy Crawford; Andi Eigenmann
- Production companies: ABS-CBN Film Productions, Inc.; Viva Films
- Distributed by: Star Cinema; Viva Films
- Release date: September 18, 2013
- Running time: 105 minutes
- Country: Philippines
- Languages: Filipino; Tagalog
- Box office: ₱55,266,151.00

Momzillas (stylized as MomZillas) is a 2013 Filipino comedy film directed by Wenn V. Deramas and produced by Star Cinema and Viva Films. It stars Maricel Soriano, Eugene Domingo, Billy Crawford, and Andi Eigenmann, and is part of Star Cinema's 20th anniversary presentation.

== Plot ==
Elwood, an architect, is preparing for his wedding to Rina. Rina's mother, Minerva, returns from London for the wedding, while Elwood's mother, Clara, has been doing odd jobs. Minerva and Clara meet and clash, discovering Clara's affair with Minerva's husband. Rina tries to reconcile them with a bridal shower on a yacht, but a storm leaves them stranded on an island. Despite constant fighting, they eventually reconcile when Clara helps Minerva after she steps on a sea urchin. Elwood and Rina's search for their parents leads to their abduction by rebels, from which they are saved by the military. Elwood blames Rina, leading to their breakup.

Minerva and Clara are found near SM Mall of Asia and return home to find funeral services underway. The wedding is called off, but Minerva and Clara try to reconcile their children. Their efforts fail, leading Minerva to hire actors to stage a kidnapping to push through the wedding, but real kidnappers abduct them instead. The news of their abduction reconciles Elwood and Rina. The kidnappers demand Rina marry Elwood for their release. The police intervene, saving Minerva and Clara, and Rina marries Elwood. Minerva returns to London, telling Clara to keep in touch.

== Cast ==
- Maricel Soriano as Clara del Valle
- Eugene Domingo as Minerva Capistrano
- Billy Crawford as Elwood del Valle
- Andi Eigenmann as Rina Capistrano – del Valle
- Candy Pangilinan as Gracia
- Divina Valencia as Lola Maria
- Luz Valdez as Lola Juanita
- Mel Martinez as Liio
- Atak as Wedding Priest
- Eagle Riggs as a Wedding Coordinator
- Joey Paras as Tito
- Charles Yulo
- Paul Jake Castillo
- Karen Dematera as Karen
- Tess Antonio as a Wedding Coordinator
- Vince de Jesus
- Eri Neeman as Police
- Jeff Luna as Jimboy
- Cristine Reyes
- Christian Vasquez as Love of Minerva and Clara
- Marc Solis as Kidnapper
- Andrea Brillantes as Young Rina
- Calvin Joseph Gomez as Young Elwood
- Jason Francisco as Fisherman
