= Inday Inday sa Balitaw =

- Official movie poster
- Directed by: Luciano B. Carlos
- Screenplay by: Luciano B. Carlos; Jose Javier Reyes
- Story by: Pablo S. Gomez
- Produced by: Lily Y. Monteverde; Charo Santos-Concio; Malou N. Santos
- Starring: Maricel Soriano; Susan Roces
- Cinematography: Gener Buenaseda
- Edited by: Efren Jarlego
- Music by: Willy Cruz
- Production company: Regal Films
- Release date: August 28, 1986
- Running time: 105 minutes
- Country: Philippines
- Language: Filipino

Inday Inday sa Balitaw is a 1986 Philippine comedy film directed by Luciano Carlos and written by Pablo S. Gomez, with screenplay by Jose Javier Reyes.

== Plot ==
The story revolves around Inday (Maricel Soriano), a beautiful and persevering girl who was abandoned by her mother during her childhood. She despised her mother, but due to her longing for motherly love, Inday can’t help but feel drawn to Monina (Susan Roces), a longing mother. However, their relationship was cut short due to unexpected circumstances.

== Cast ==
Main cast

- Susan Roces as Monina Rosales
- Eddie Gutierrez as Danny
- Maricel Soriano as Maria Luisa Rosario "Inday" Rosales
- William Martinez as Cleto
- Matet De Leon as Tiyanak

Supporting cast

- Armida Siguion-Reyna as Isabel Pabustan
- Roderick Paulate as Tonette
- Lucita Soriano as Doray
- Cynthia Patag as Chita
- Flora Gasser
- Metring David
- Dencio Padilla

== Production ==
The film was produced by Regal Films, and color processing was done by LVN Pictures. All the filming facilities and post-production were provided by Regal Films and was released on 28 August 1986.
