= Separada =

1994 drama film by Chito S. Roño

- Poster of the film's restored version, designed by Justin Besana
- Directed by: Chito S. Roño
- Screenplay by: Ricky Lee; Tessie Tomas
- Produced by: Simon C. Ongpin; Malou N. Santos
- Starring: Maricel Soriano; Edu Manzano; Sharmaine Arnaiz; Patrick Garcia; Angelica Panganiban
- Cinematography: Jose Batac Jr.
- Edited by: Joe Solo
- Music by: Nonong Buencamino
- Production company: Star Cinema
- Distributed by: Star Cinema
- Release date: 12 October 1994
- Running time: 118 minutes
- Country: Philippines
- Language: Filipino

Separada (English: A Separated Woman) is a 1994 Filipino drama film directed by Chito S. Roño from a screenplay written by Ricky Lee and Tessie Tomas. The film stars Maricel Soriano and Edu Manzano, who were separated in real life in 1991, as the married couple whose marriage became dysfunctional when the husband committed an affair with another woman, played by Sharmaine Arnaiz, leaving his wife to take care their two children single-handedly. It also includes the special participation of Eddie Rodriguez, Liza Lorena, and Lani Mercado, and the introduction of then-child stars Patrick Garcia and Angelica Panganiban.

Produced and distributed by Star Cinema, the film was theatrically released on 12 October 1994 and became successful at the box office, receiving acclaim from critics and audiences. In 2018, the film was digitally restored and remastered by ABS-CBN Film Restoration, in partnership with Central Digital Lab.

== Plot ==
Melissa Neri, a creative director in an advertising company, is about to celebrate her wedding anniversary with Dodi, who owns a car shop. On her way to their dinner date, Melissa gets stuck in traffic, causing her to arrive late. Frustrated, Dodi leaves and goes to his mistress, Sandy. Despite this, Melissa and Dodi still manage to celebrate their anniversary simply.

Melissa and Dodi are blessed with two children, Vincent and Jenny. However, Dodi often spends his weekends with Sandy. Eventually, Sandy tells Dodi that she is pregnant, which leads her to reveal the truth to Melissa. Melissa confronts Dodi about his infidelity and pleads with him not to leave their family for the sake of their children. Despite her pleas, Dodi decides to leave, causing Melissa to fall into depression. Her emotional struggles also affect Vincent and Jenny. During this difficult time, Melissa seeks comfort and support from her friends—Susan, Cookie, Benny, and Mabel.

Although Dodi has left, he continues to visit his children. Melissa takes on the role of a single parent and raises Vincent and Jenny on her own. When Sandy realizes that Dodi still loves Melissa and their family, she decides to break up with him. Dodi later returns home and asks Melissa for reconciliation for the sake of their children. However, Melissa refuses, saying that he is only using their children as an excuse. With no other choice, Dodi leaves again, and Melissa explains the situation to Vincent and Jenny.

Later, Melissa decides to let Vincent appear in a soda commercial. During the shoot, a cameraman filming a top shot accidentally falls onto the performers, including Vincent. Furious, Dodi blames Melissa for allowing Vincent to work and accuses her of being irresponsible, especially since they are experiencing financial difficulties. In a heated argument, Melissa reminds Dodi of his affair with Sandy and how he abandoned their family.

When Melissa and Cookie visit Vincent at the hospital, they are unaware that he has already been discharged. Worried, Melissa calls Dodi, who tells her that he plans to take Vincent and Jenny to the United States, claiming that Melissa is an irresponsible parent. With the help of Arman, Susan’s lawyer husband, Melissa files for custody of her children, leading to a court battle.

During the trial, Dodi’s lawyer suggests that Vincent testify and choose which parent he wants to live with. In court, Vincent is asked who he loves more and whether he prefers to stay with Melissa or Dodi. When the lawyer pressures Vincent, Melissa interrupts the proceedings. Eventually, Melissa withdraws her case and tells Dodi to take the children with him. However, Dodi insists that the children should stay with Melissa. They both agree to have their marriage annulled and decide that they should remain friends.

In the end, Melissa celebrates Valentine’s Day with her friends—Cookie, Benny, Mabel, and Susan—embracing her life as a single woman.

== Cast ==
- Maricel Soriano as Melissa
- Edu Manzano as Dodie
- Sharmaine Arnaiz as Sandy
- Patrick Garcia as Vincent
- Angelica Panganiban as Jenny
- Liza Lorena as Carmela
- Eddie Rodriguez as Melissa's Daddy
- Lani Mercado as Susan
- Raquel Villavicencio as Mabel
- Ai-Ai Delas Alas as Cookie
- Teresa Loyzaga as Benny
- Mandy Ochoa as Cyrus
- Lloyd Umali as Sonny
- Dennis Roldan as Arman
- Ronnie Lazaro as Hector
- Ramon Recto as Carlo
- Gamaliel Viray as Atty. Serafio
- Khryss Adalia as Commercial Director
- Idda Yaneza as Manang Bella
- Madeleine Nicolas as Teacher
- Estrella Antonio as Cook / Maid
- Streetboys as Commercial Dancers
- Mimi Yaptiongco as Maid

== Production ==
Director Chito S. Roño directed many films of different genres, including family dramas and romance, and when it comes to directing films about "separation", he decided to make Separada unique from most films about the said subject. He said that he wanted to direct a film "that is sophisticated, something different from the usual domestic melodrama," and departs from the idea of a woman going into a state of sadness and despair when her husband ditches her for the mistress.

Sharmaine Arnaiz, who was cast as Sandy in the film, said that she is not concerned or worried about typecasting her as the "mistress," and she admitted that the film relates to her because the separation between Maricel and Edu's respective characters is reminiscent of her parents' separation.

== Reception ==
=== Critical response ===
Chantal Ramos, writing for Sinegang PH, gave the film four out of five stars, praising its plot, direction, acting performances, and emotional impact on the audience. According to Ramos, the film is described as "a querida movie that, for once, prizes authenticity over sensationalism" and "a stark contrast" to the other film also helmed by Roño, Lee, and Soriano, Minsan Lang Kita Iibigin.

=== Accolades ===
Award-giving organization	Date of ceremony	Category	Recipient(s)	Result	Ref.
11th PMPC Star Awards for Movies	March 1995	Best Actress	Maricel Soriano	Won (Note: Tied with Dawn Zulueta.)	
43rd FAMAS Awards	15 May 1995	Best Picture	Separada	Nominated	
43rd FAMAS Awards	15 May 1995	Best Actress	Maricel Soriano	Nominated	
43rd FAMAS Awards	15 May 1995	Best Child Actor	Patrick Garcia	Nominated	
43rd FAMAS Awards	15 May 1995	Best Child Actress	Angelica Panganiban	Won	
43rd FAMAS Awards	15 May 1995	Best Director	Chito S. Roño	Nominated	
