= Ama, Ina, Anak =

1996 drama film by Jose Javier Reyes

- Poster of the restored version, designed by Justin Besana
- Directed by: Jose Javier Reyes
- Written by: Jose Javier Reyes
- Produced by: Charo Santos-Concio; Lily Y. Monteverde; Malou N. Santos
- Starring: Maricel Soriano; Edu Manzano; Angelica Panganiban
- Cinematography: Ricardo Jacinto
- Edited by: Manet A. Dayrit
- Music by: Nonong Buencamino
- Production company: Star Cinema
- Distributed by: Star Cinema
- Release date: February 29, 1996
- Running time: 110 minutes
- Country: Philippines
- Language: Filipino

Ama, Ina, Anak (English: Father, Mother, Child) is a 1996 Philippine family drama film written and directed by Jose Javier Reyes. Starring Maricel Soriano, Edu Manzano, and Angelica Panganiban in lead roles, with the supporting cast including Jolina Magdangal, Rico Yan, Boots Anson-Roa, and Jackie Lou Blanco, the story follows a married couple who decided to adopt a child after having undergone unsuccessful attempts to conceive one. However, years later, as the adopted child grows up, her adoptive parents have a child of their own.

Produced and distributed by Star Cinema, the film was theatrically released on February 29, 1996, and reunites former husband-and-wife Maricel Soriano and Edu Manzano since they last appeared together two years earlier in Separada, another Star Cinema-produced film. It is also the second film in which Soriano and Angelica Panganiban act together. In 2022, the film's digitally restored and remastered version was released.

== Plot ==
Marilen and Santi are a couple who have tried to conceive a child numerous times. However, their efforts to have one ended in miscarriages. Because she wanted to have a child, Marilen's friend Cristy suggested adopting a child from an orphanage, where Cristy's cousin is the superior. Reluctant at first, Santi agreed to adopt a child. Marilen and Santi adopted a baby girl and named her Issa. Issa's biological mother was only 14 years old when she was born. However, she abandoned Issa at the hospital because she could not provide for her. Years later, Issa grew up to be a happy and cheerful girl. However, Marilen was shocked when she learned that she was pregnant. Because her pregnancy was sensitive, Marilen had to be more careful until she suffered from bleeding when she saw Issa playing at the poolside.

Marilen gave birth to a boy and named him Gabriel. This made Issa more jealous and depressed, especially when Jason, Bea's son, told her that she was adopted and that she would be out of Santi and Marilen's lives. Because his attention is now on Gabriel, Santi would alienate himself from Issa. When Issa was left with Gabriel, she noticed that Gabriel had no pillow on his head. Precy, Gabriel's nanny, noticed that Gabriel's head was covered with a pillow. This made everyone in the house panic, especially Santi, who rushed the baby to the hospital. Santi would later find out that Issa was the one who covered Gabriel. He hurriedly rushed home and lashed out at Issa, saying that she was an ingrate. He then said that Issa should leave the house. With no other choice, Issa, along with her aunt Owie, went to Marilen's parents to stay. Santi wants to put Issa up for adoption. Owie's boyfriend, Dennis, has a relative, and they are willing to adopt Issa. Marilen confronts Santi for being a selfish person after the latter threatens to leave with Gabriel if Marilen brings Issa. Santi realizes his mistakes and forgives Issa as she was about to leave with her new family. He would also apologize to Marilen, saying that he doesn't want to lose any of his loved ones.

== Cast ==
- Maricel Soriano as Marilen Alvarez
- Edu Manzano as Santi Alvarez
- Angelica Panganiban as Issa
- Jolina Magdangal as Owie Nolasco
- Rico Yan as Dennis
- Boots Anson-Roa as Cita Nolasco
- Jackie Lou Blanco as Bea
- Cherry Pie Picache as Susan
- Subas Herrero as Fernando Alvarez
- Teresa Loyzaga as Christy
- Nonie Buencamino as Leo
- Stefano Mori as Jason
- Mike Austria as Barry
- Imelda Trinidad as Elvie
- Naty Mallares as Lola Maring
- Ernie Zarate as Dado
- Mon Confiado as Rolly
- Olga Natividad as Precy

== Reception ==
=== Critical response ===
Isah V. Red, writing for Manila Standard, gave the film a mixed-to-negative review, describing the film as "overwrought and overacted", similar to the television films (telesine) shown and produced by local TV networks. He concluded the review as "a waste of time" and an "insult" to the intellectual audience.

=== Accolades ===
Award-giving organization	Date of ceremony	Category	Recipient(s)	Result	Ref.
45th FAMAS Awards	2 May 1997	Best Actor	Edu Manzano	Nominated	
45th FAMAS Awards	2 May 1997	Best Actress	Maricel Soriano	Nominated	
45th FAMAS Awards	2 May 1997	Best Child Actress	Angelica Panganiban	Nominated	

== Digital restoration ==
The film was digitally restored and remastered in cooperation with ABS-CBN Film Restoration and Central Digital Lab. The restored version was released online via KTX.ph on April 26, 2022, added with a pre-show where the head of ABS-CBN Film Archives, Leo P. Katigbak, serves as the host and interviews the film's lead star, Maricel Soriano.
