= Minsan Lang Kita Iibigin (film) =

1994 drama film by Chito S. Roño

Minsan Lang Kitang Iibigin
- Directed by: Chito S. Roño
- Written by: Ricardo Lee
- Produced by: Charo Santos-Concio; Lily Y. Monteverde; Victor Villegas
- Starring: Maricel Soriano; Gabby Concepcion; Zsa Zsa Padilla
- Cinematography: Johnny Araojo; Ramon Marcelino; Jun Pereira
- Edited by: Renato de Leon
- Music by: Mon del Rosario
- Production companies: Star Cinema; Moviestars Productions
- Distributed by: Star Cinema
- Release date: March 16, 1994
- Running time: 100 minutes
- Country: Philippines
- Language: Filipino

Minsan Lang Kita Iibigin is a 1994 Filipino drama film directed by Chito S. Roño from a story and screenplay written by Ricky Lee. Starring Maricel Soriano, Gabby Concepcion and Zsa Zsa Padilla, the film tells the story of a close friendship that becomes strained when the wife finds her husband having an affair with her bestfriend. It is one of the films restored by the ABS-CBN Film Restoration Project.

Produced by Star Cinema and Moviestars Productions, the film was theatrically released on March 16, 1994. In 2021, Maricel's line "Huwag mo akong ma-Terry Terry!" became a trend on the internet.

== Plot ==
Dave (Gabby Concepcion) and workmate Alex (Matt Ranillo III) are best friends as well as their wives, Terry (Maricel Soriano), a plain housewife, and Monique (Zsa Zsa Padilla), a successful television host. When the Vice President of Finance, where Dave and Alex are working, died, Dave knew that Alex would be his replacement. Dave and Terry had a toxic relationship as Terry had no time to have a child. When Alex was promoted, Terry was so envious because of Dave's humility. Monique would later discover about Terry's condition. Monique told Alex that she wanted to help her. But, a car followed them, and Alex fought the driver of the car. But, someone got out of the car and shot Alex in the back of the head, and died because of the incident. Dave and Monique deeply mourned his death and Dave became Alex's replacement.

At a time of deep sorrow, Dave becomes Monique's companion. Until a woman named Linda seduces Dave and is discovered by Monique and Terry. Monique told Dave that she was planning to quit her hosting duties and find another job or a business. Suddenly, when they're about to go home due to the rain, Monique and Dave kiss each other. But, Monique would stay away from Dave, until she discovered that she was pregnant. Terry told Monique that Dave is now cold towards her. She also suspects that she's having an affair with another woman. Terry saw Dave giving money to Monique. Dave would insist that the money will be for their child. Terry would become suspicious and saw in Dave's car, an envelope with a blank check, and a letter to Monique saying that he is planning to separate from Terry.

Terry came to Monique's house and confronted her about her affair with Dave. Monique also admits that she's pregnant and Dave's the father. In a fit of anger, Terry threatens to stab Monique, but is restrained by Monique. Until Terry repeatedly stabbed Monique and cleaned up the house. She went home without Dave knowing what happened. Dave would learn from a phone call about what happened to Monique. The police came and tried to arrest Terry. Terry tries to resist, but Dave comes to Terry trying to calm her. Monique miraculously survived and told the police, a burglar stabbed her, sparing Terry from the crime. Terry was released and went to Monique and asked for forgiveness. Monique forgave Terry and said that she's already erased her from her life, ending their friendship. Dave is planning to leave Terry, but Terry insists Dave not to leave and that she'll change for the better. She also told Dave that her family, which was a wealthy family, suffered financially when her father died. She was also forced by her mother to have sex with a rich sadist to whom her father owes money. The sadist slit Terry in the leg so that she'll remember that she's a sadist's owner. Terry asked Dave to help her start over again, regaining their relationship.

Years later, Monique had a son named Vincent. She would encounter Dave once again. Upon seeing Vincent, he was surprised, not knowing that he was his son. Terry, who now has a child, was also with Dave. Monique now has a successful business while Terry is now contented as a simple housewife.

== Cast ==
- Maricel Soriano as Terry
- Gabby Concepcion as Dave
- Zsa Zsa Padilla as Monique
- Mat Ranillo III as Alex
- Rina Reyes as Linda
- Mandy Ochoa as Brando
- John Villar as Tirso
- Nanette Medved as Dave's girlfriend
- Amado Cortez as Mr. Barredo

== Reception ==
=== Critical reception ===
Chantal Ramos, writing for Sinegang PH, gave the film three-and-a-half out of 5 stars and described it as a "real proof of the unpredictable alchemy of movies" and reached the "levels of excess" from the film What Ever Happened to Baby Jane? (1962). She praised the lead stars' performances, Lee's screenplay, and Roño's direction, though she noticed that the screenplay had few failed flaws.

=== Accolades ===
Year	Awards	Category	Recipient	Result	Ref.
1994	10th Star Awards for Movies	Best Supporting Actress	Zsa Zsa Padilla	Won	
1994	43rd FAMAS Awards	Best Cinematography	Johnny Araojo	Won	
