= Maricel Soriano =

Filipino actress (born 1965)

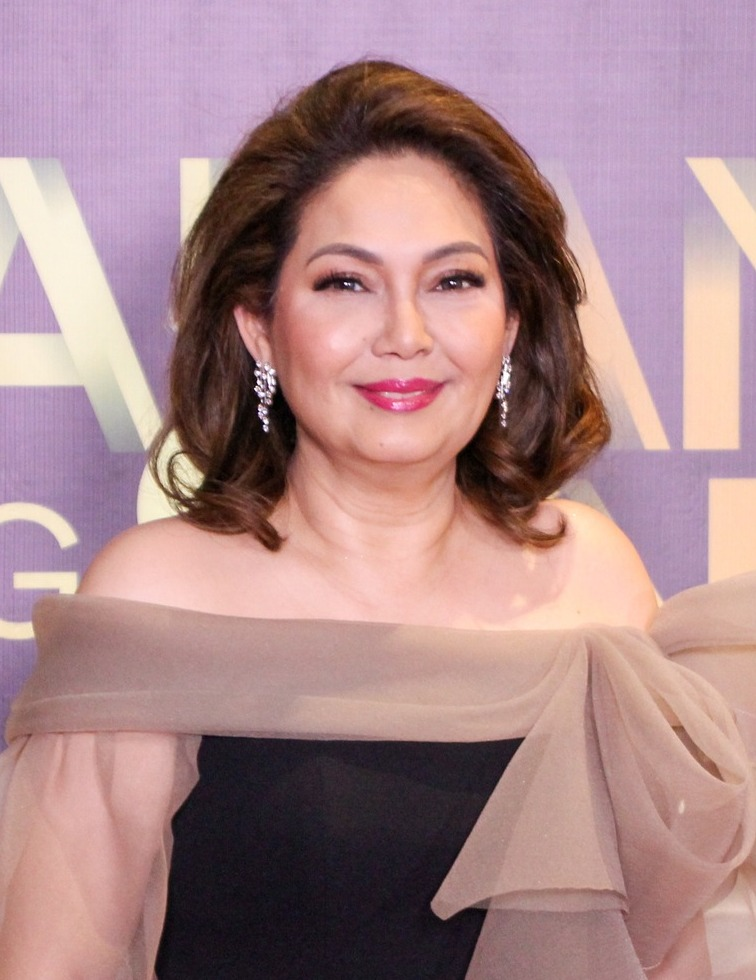
- Soriano in 2023
- Born: Maria Cecilia Dador Soriano; February 25, 1965 (age 61); Pasay, Rizal, Philippines
- Occupations: Actress; television personality
- Years active: 1971–present
- Works: Full list
- Spouse: Edu Manzano (m. 1989; div. 1991)
- Children: 2
- Relatives: Meryll Soriano (niece); Mel Martinez (brother)
- Awards: Full list

Maria Cecilia "Maricel" Dador Soriano (born February 25, 1965) is a Filipino actress and television personality. Known for her intense acting style and versatility, she is known for playing dramatic and comedic leading roles in films and television. Over the course of her career, she has received numerous accolades, including two Asian Television Awards, six FAMAS Awards, four Luna Awards, fourteen Box Office Entertainment Awards and twelve Star Awards for both Movies and Television. Soriano is widely known as ‘The Diamond Star’ in the Philippines and among Filipinos worldwide.

Soriano began a career as a child actress, debuting in the 1971 film My Heart Belongs to Daddy. She went on to appear in several supporting roles in the 1970s, winning her first acting award at the 9th Manila Tagalog Film Festival as "Best Child Actress" for her performance in the film Alaala Mo, Daigdig Ko (1973) and as Shirley Puruntong in the longest running Philippine sitcom John en Marsha (1973–1991). She received her first FAMAS Award nomination at age 14 in the film Yakuza Contract (1978). In the early '80s, she was launched as one of the first Regal Babies and appeared in blockbuster films throughout the decade such as Inday Bote (1985), Batang Quiapo (1986) and Babaing Hampaslupa (1989).

She remained visible in television through her drama anthologies Maricel Regal Drama Special (1987–1990) and The Maricel Drama Special (1990–1997). She received seventeen 'Best Actress' nominations at the FAMAS Awards, seventeen 'Best Actress' nominations at the Luna Awards, eighteen 'Best Actress' nominations at the Star Awards for Movies, eight 'Best Actress' nominations at the Gawad Urian Awards, and eight 'Best Actress' nominations at the Metro Manila Film Festival for her acclaimed portrayals in films. She was inducted at the Eastwood City Walk of Fame for her significant contributions to Philippine film and television.

== Personal life ==
Maricel Soriano was born in Pasay to Linda Dador and Victor Soriano. Initially residing in Makati, she and her sister, Maria Victoria "Becbec," attended St. Mary's Academy of Pasay for grade school. After moving to Kamuning, Quezon City, she continued her education at Trinity University of Asia (then College), CEU High School, and OB Montessori. Her hectic showbiz schedule prevented her from completing secondary education. In previous interviews, Soriano mentioned that if not for her career in the entertainment industry, she might have pursued a career as a stewardess or a teacher. Despite not finishing formal education, she is computer-literate and skilled in designing accessories, T-shirts, cards, certificates, and stationery. Additionally, she personally designed the graphics and title credits for her drama anthology.

From their rented house in Kamuning, Quezon City, she lived independently by getting a townhouse in Greenhills, San Juan, while her mother and siblings rented a house along Xavierville Avenue, near Katipunan Avenue, in Quezon City. When her house was finally completed in White Plains, Quezon City in 1985, she moved in together with her son, Marron Soriano. She married Edu Manzano in 1989 and joined him in Makati, but later went back to White Plains. When she gave birth to Sebastien Soriano, her mother and brothers joined her in White Plains. She briefly had her own condo in Rockwell Center in Makati with Eric Quizon as a neighbor. She currently stays in Greenhills, San Juan with her two sons.

As a businesswoman, she and her sister with erstwhile manager Manny Valera established Excellent Productions in 1990 but was later renamed Diamond Star Productions, Inc. taking over the weekly production of her TV drama show when Regal Films decided to discontinue. It was renamed "The Maricel Soriano Drama Special" with her sister as Executive Producer and Maricel as Line Producer. The same production outfit was responsible for TV sitcoms - Kaya ni Mister, Kaya ni Misis, Mary D' Potter and Bida si Mister, Bida si Misis and the film Kung Kaya Mo, Kaya Ko Rin (1996) with Cesar Montano. She also opened a sing-along bar, Mr. Melody, in Quezon City and Diamond Star Records.

In showbiz, she lists co-actors Roderick Paulate and Jackie Lou Blanco as her best friends. Other personalities whom she was very close with were King of Comedy, Dolphy and versatile actress, Nida Blanca (whom she considered as second parents); dramatic actress Charito Solis; comedian Nova Villa; producer and actress Armida Siguion-Reyna, actor Eric Quizon, make-up artist James Cooper; talent manager Anthony "Tonet Macho" Roquel; and award-winning actresses Gina Alajar, Jacklyn Jose and Rosanna Roces.

She was married to Edu Manzano from 1989 to 1991 and maintains friendly relations with him. Aside from her sister, who is the mother of award-winning actress Meryll Soriano, her siblings include Michael "Mykee" Martinez and movie/TV actor and entrepreneur Meliton "Mel" Martinez.

== Career ==
=== 1970s: Early work and career beginnings ===
Soriano started acting at the age of six in the 1971 film My Heart Belongs to Daddy with Tirso Cruz III and fellow child actress Snooky Serna. She was brought by her paternal grandmother to Sampaguita Pictures search for a child actress who will portray Tirso Cruz, III's younger sister. She had grabbed the role with her dancing, singing and acting skills. Soriano developed her comic skills under the guidance of the veteran comedians Dolphy and Nida Blanca, both of whom she considered second parents, especially when she grew up acting in John en Marsha where she was a regular cast.

=== 1980s: Rise to prominence ===
In 1980, Soriano was signed up by Regal Films and became part of the movie production company's pioneering batch of contract stars who were collectively called Regal Babies along with Snooky Serna, Dina Bonnevie, Gabby Concepcion, Albert Martinez, Alfie Anido, Jimi Melendez and her loveteam partner, William Martinez. Aside from working in John en Marsha, which spawned several movie spinoffs, and other Dolphy productions, Maricel starred in the youth-oriented TV program Kaluskos Musmos, which started airing in 1984. She was eventually introduced in the coming-of-age movie, Underage (1980). In their first film together, Oh, My Mama!, Soriano and Martinez showed great chemistry and became a love team on and offscreen. They went on to star more projects throughout the decade including the comedies Pabling (1981), Galawgaw (1982), and Inday Bote (1985), as well as the dramas Hindi Kita Malimot (1982), Teenage Marriage (1984), and The Graduates (1986). She was also paired with other leading men such as Gabby Concepcion in Pepe en Pilar (1983), Ronnie Ricketts in John & Marsha (1986), Fernando Poe Jr. in Batang Quiapo (1986), and Randy Santiago in Taray and Teroy (1988). Soriano also headlined a string of hit musical-variety TV shows, such as I Am What I Am, Maricel Live!, and Maria! Maria!, before starring in her first drama anthology, Maricel Regal Drama Special, which aired on ABS-CBN from 1987 to 1992. The PMPC honored her as Best Actress in a Drama Anthology (The Maricel Soriano Drama Special) in 1988, 1989 and 1997.

Soriano is also considered the "Dancing Queen" of the 1980s, and her signature dance numbers, "I Am What I Am", "Body Dancer", "O La La", "Rico Mambo", Angela Clemmons' "Give Me Just a Little More Time" and Shalamar's "A Night to Remember", among others have continued to be associated with her even to this very day. While not a professional singer, she even managed to record two songs, the theme song of the movie, Oh, My Mama! and the gold record hit "Ngayon at Habang Panahon". Aside from a sold-out concert at the Smart Araneta Coliseum entitled "Hello, Hello Maricel" in 1987, she has appeared in hit concerts locally and abroad in the late 1980s and early 1990s.

=== 1990s: Breakthrough ===
"There’s no Regal without Maricel."

— Mother Lily Monteverde on Soriano's commercial impact during her prime (2019).

Soriano reached greater heights in her career, thus establishing herself as the "Diamond Star". She top billed a string of critically acclaimed and blockbuster films such as Ikaw Pa Lang ang Minahal (1992), Minsan Lang Kita Iibigin (1994), Vampira (1994), Separada (1994), Dahas (1995), Inagaw Mo ang Lahat sa Akin (1995), and Soltera (1999). She was visible on television through her drama anthology The Maricel Drama Special which ran for the next seven years.

She was also named as "Drama Anthology Queen" in the early 1990s because of her successful weekly drama show (produced by Regal Films and ABS-CBN) topped the primetime ratings game since its airing in October 1986. In July 1988, Freddie M. Garcia acknowledged that Soriano was the number one star of ABS-CBN, of which he was then the general manager. After two years, she with sister Maria Victoria and former manager Manny Valera established Excellent Productions and took the helm of producing the show. The drama show lasted for ten years and was awarded by the Catholic Mass Media Awards in 1988 and 1989 and the KBP's Golden Dove Media Awards in 1992 and 1993 as outstanding drama anthology. As main performer, she received Star Award's best actress for drama honors in 1988, 1989 and 1997.

=== 2000s: Continued success ===
Soriano continued to dominate the big and small screens at the turn of the new millennium with the blockbusters Mano Po (2002) and A Love Story (2007), and the top-rating sitcom Kaya ni Mister, Kaya ni Misis (opposite Cesar Montano), which was eventually retitled Bida si Mister, Bida si Misis. In 2006, Soriano was back with Regal Films as the lead star of Bahay Kubo, a movie intended for the 2007 Metro Manila Film Festival. In September 2009, Soriano appeared in Florinda, the third and final episode of Sineserye Presents: The Susan Roces Cinema Collection.

=== 2010s: Hiatus and comeback ===
Soriano went on a two-year hiatus in 2009 following the death of her mother. In early 2010s, Soriano became a freelancer and made several guest appearances in GMA-7 shows. She made her comeback following her short hiatus in 2011 with her movie Yesterday, Today, Tomorrow, which was an entry for the Metro Manila Film Festival in 2011.

In 2014, she inked a program contract with her home station, GMA Network, after backing out of ABS-CBN's Bukas na Lang Kita Mamahalin, which was supposed to be her teleserye comeback but Dawn Zulueta eventually replaced her role in the said show. She finally made her comeback in 2014 through the hit television series, Ang Dalawang Mrs. Real. It was her first major project as a Kapuso actress which also marked her return on the small screen and then did guesting in Bubble Gang and Sunday PinaSaya. The Society of Entertainment (Enpress) thru their Golden Screen Awards for TV, the OFW Kakampi Awards and the EduKCircle TV Awards gave her the Best Actress for Drama trophies for her compelling performance in GMA Network's Ang Dalawang Mrs. Real. She also took on supporting roles in the comedies Momzillas (2013); Girl, Boy, Bakla, Tomboy (2013); and My 2 Mommies (2018). I

In 2017, she eventually returned to showbiz through her home network, ABS-CBN.

== Acting style and reception ==
Referred to as the "Diamond Star" for achieving both commercial and critical success, Soriano is frequently cited as one of the greatest actresses in Philippines cinema, noted for her characteristically frank, street-smart, and quick-witted style. With over 100 acting credits, she is noted for her versatility as an actress and performer. She has been honored by various award-giving bodies for her work in film and television. Among them are 3 Asian Television Awards and several honorary trophies from FAMAS, the EDDYs and Cinema One Originals Digital Film Festival. Soriano ranks second (behind Nora Aunor) among Filipino actress with the most "Best Actress" wins at the Metro Manila Film Festival and Young Critics Circle. Soriano is also recognised as the “Drama Anthology Queen” for the success of her two headlining drama series — Maricel Regal Drama Special (1987–1990) and The Maricel Drama Special (1990–1997), which had a ten-year run in the television altogether and became one of the longest running TV anthology series in Philippine history.

She has been an influential figure to many actors and actresses in the Philippine entertainment industry. Iza Calzado and Jodi Sta. Maria praised her generosity in "giving acting tips to them on the set", calling it the "Inay Maria School of Acting." In 2002, Alessandra de Rossi expressed her desire to follow the career path of Soriano saying: "She's equally effective in drama, comedy and action." Numerous actors have either mentioned Soriano as a major influence or showed admiration including Judy Ann Santos, Angel Locsin, Vice Ganda, Eugene Domingo, Lovi Poe, Joey Paras, JM de Guzman Janella Salvador Jericho Rosales, John Lapus, and Arjo Atayde.

=== In popular culture ===
Soriano has been referred to as a "Gay Icon" for her campiness and larger-than-life characters in films and television. Jujiin Samonte of Mega Magazine stated her lasting impact to LGBTQIA+ community saying: "her work and allyship have made a lasting impact on our queer culture." She has expressed ardent support and appreciation to drag, thus birthing her own drag persona, "Kinang Inay". Em Enriquez of Preview Magazine also stated that Soriano has long been an ally and "has been frequenting drag shows and making friends with (drag) queens everywhere.

== Selected filmography ==
=== Films ===
- My Heart Belongs to Daddy (1982)
- Alaala Mo, Daigdig Ko (1973)
- John and Marsha (1974)
- John & Marsha sa Amerika (Part Two) (1975)
- John and Marsha '77 (1977)
- Yakuza Contract (1978)
- John & Marsha '80 (1980)
- Underage (1980)
- Summer Love (1981)
- Oh My Mama (1981)
- Galawgaw (1982)
- Da Best of John & Marsha sa Pelikula (1983)
- Saan Darating ang Umaga? (1983)
- Da Best of John & Marsha sa Pelikula Part II (1984)
- Kaya Kong Abutin ang Langit (1984)
- Anak ni Waray vs Anak ni Biday (1984)
- John & Marsha '85 (Sa Probinsiya) (1985)
- Hinugot sa Langit (1985)
- Inday Bote (1985)
- John & Marsha '86: TNT sa Amerika (1986)
- The Graduates (1986)
- Inday Inday sa Balitaw (1986)
- Batang Quiapo (1986)
- Pinulot Ka Lang sa Lupa (1987)
- Super Inday and the Golden Bibe (1988)
- Babaing Hampaslupa (1988)
- Taray at Teroy (1988)
- John en Marsha Ngayon '91 (1991)
- Dinampot Ka Lang sa Putik (1991)
- Ikaw Pa Lang ang Minahal (1992)
- Dobol Dribol (1992)
- Minsan Lang Kita Iibigin (1994)
- Vampira (1994)
- Separada (1994)
- Dahas (1995)
- Pustahan Tayo Mahal Mo Ako (1995)
- Sabi Mo Mahal Mo Ako Walang Bawian (1995)
- Ang Tange Kong Pag-ibig (1995)
- Inagaw Mo ang Lahat sa Akin (1995)
- Ama... Ina... Anak (1996)
- Abot Kamay ang Pangarap (1996)
- Minsan Lamang Magmamahal (1997)
- Nasaan ang Puso (1997)
- Ikaw Pa Eh Lab Kita (1997)
- Kung Ayaw Mo, Huwag Mo! (1998)
- Sige, Subukan Mo (1998)
- Tulak ng Bibig Kabig ng Dibdib (1998)
- Soltera (1999)
- Abandonada (2000)
- Mila (2001)
- Mano Po (2002)
- Filipinas (2003)
- I Will Survive! (2004)
- Numbalikdiwa (2006)
- Inang Yaya (2006)
- A Love Story (2007)
- Bahay Kubo: A Pinoy Mano Po! (2007)
- T2 (2009)
- Yesterday, Today, Tomorrow (2011)
- Girl, Boy, Bakla, Tomboy (2013)
- Momzillas (2013)
- Lumayo Ka Nga sa Akin (2016)
- My 2 Mommies (2018)
- The Heiress (2019)
- In His Mother's Eyes (2023)
- First Light (2025)
- Meet, Greet & Bye (2025)
- Life After You (2026)
- Haunted Carnival (2026)

== Television shows ==
- John en Marsha (1974)
- Maricel Regal Drama Special (1987)
- The Maricel Drama Special (1989)
- Kaya ni Mister, Kaya ni Misis (1997)
- Mary D' Potter (2001)
- Bida si Mister, Bida si Misis (2002)
- Maalaala Mo Kaya: Sing-along Bar (2003)
- Vietnam Rose (2005)
- John en Shirley (2006)
- Diz Iz It! Guest Judge (2010)
- Pilyang Kerubin (2010)
- Maalaala Mo Kaya: Kalapati The Ninoy and Cory Story Part 1 Cory Aquino (2010)
- Maalaala Mo Kaya: The Ninoy and Cory Story Part 2 Cory Aquino (2010)
- Ang Dalawang Mrs. Real (2014)
- The General's Daughter (2019)
- Ang Sa Iyo Ay Akin (2020)
- Pira-Pirasong Paraiso (2023)
- Linlang (2023)
- Lavender Fields (2024)

=== Music ===
Soriano recorded a few songs in the 1980s including the gold single "Ngayon at Habang Panahon" penned by Tito Sotto and the theme song of her movie Oh, My Mama! in 1981.

=== Headlining concerts ===
Headlining concerts
Year	Title	Details	Notes	Ref.
1988	Happy Birthday Taray: Maricel Soriano	Date: February 21, Sunday; Venue: Araneta Coliseum	Sold-out birthday concert	
1986	Hello Hello Maricel	Venue: Araneta Coliseum	Sold-out concert	

== Controversies ==
In 2011, Soriano was publicly accused by two of her former housemaids of mistreatment and drug abuse, which she denied, saying that her accusers had stolen from her. In 2024, she was called to testify in the Philippine Senate after she was accused by a former Philippine Drug Enforcement Agency official of allowing her condominium unit in Makati to be used in narcotics-related activities by prominent personalities including then-Senator Bongbong Marcos. Soriano also denied the allegation, saying that she had sold the condominium unit by the time the activities occurred.
