= Maricel Regal Drama Special =

- Genre: Anthology, Drama
- Starring: Maricel Soriano
- Opening theme: "Je suis malade" by Serge Lama (Pierre Porte version)
- Country of origin: Philippines
- Original language: Filipino

Production
- Running time: 60-75 minutes
- Production company: Regal Entertainment

Original release
- Network: ABS-CBN
- Release: November 17, 1987 – March 20, 1989

Related
- The Maricel Drama Special

Maricel Regal Drama Special is a Philippine anthology drama series broadcast by ABS-CBN. Starring Maricel Soriano, it aired from November 17, 1987 to March 20, 1989 and was replaced by The Maricel Drama Special.

== Reception ==
=== Viewership ===
According to the Philippine Social Research Center (PSRC), the Maricel Regal Drama Special was the most watched program nationwide in November 1988, the fourth time the drama anthology series topped the ratings board, and stayed within the top five of the chart throughout the year, with 49.2 percent.

== See also ==
- List of programs broadcast by ABS-CBN
