= Batang Quiapo =

1986 Filipino action-comedy film

- Theatrical poster
- Directed by: Pablo Santiago
- Screenplay by: Jose N. Carreon
- Story by: Pablo S. Gomez
- Produced by: Lily Monteverde; Charo Santos; Malou N. Santos
- Starring: Fernando Poe Jr.; Maricel Soriano
- Cinematography: Ver P. Reyes
- Edited by: Augusto Salvador
- Music by: Jaime Fabregas
- Production company: Regal Films
- Distributed by: Regal Films
- Release date: October 16, 1986
- Running time: 121 minutes
- Country: Philippines
- Language: Filipino

Batang Quiapo (lit. 'Quiapo Kid') is a 1986 Filipino action comedy film directed by Pablo Santiago and starring Fernando Poe Jr. and Maricel Soriano. The film is the first and only collaboration between Poe and Soriano, and was Poe's first film under Regal Films. The film broke box-office records of its time.

A television remake loosely based on the film and starring Coco Martin began airing on the Kapamilya Channel in 2023. Rez Cortez, who played Tikboy, was the sole cast member from the film to return for the television adaptation, portraying a different character with the same name.

== Plot ==
Maria and Tikboy are two friends in Quiapo, Manila who have made pickpocketing their means of living. They attempt to steal from Baldo, a former pickpocket who was just released from prison after six years, only to be outsmarted by him. Baldo goes to his friend Iska, the owner of a small restaurant where Maria and Tikboy are regular customers, and is informed that she fabricated a story of Baldo being an overseas Filipino worker who just returned from Saudi Arabia to cover up his disappearance. Maria and Tikboy arrive at Iska's restaurant, only to see Baldo eating at a table, upon which he returns the wallets he took from them.

Baldo meets up with mechanic Momoy David, an old friend of his, to ask for help in finding a job, leading to his employment as a charcutier at a lechon shop. Maria soon becomes friends with Baldo, joining him on a mission to help Miniong, a friend of hers, retrieve money he lost to counterfeiters and swap it with the fake gold bar they sold to him. Maria's boisterous antics nearly disrupt the mission for Baldo, but they eventually succeed. Baldo soon admits his criminal past to Maria, and tries to convince her to leave pickpocketing for good, to which she agrees. However, Maria sees Baldo continuously meet up with a woman, to which she becomes jealous.

Maria vents out her resentment by drinking and working as an entertainer at a club, with Baldo getting irate for her doing the latter. Though Baldo begins confronting Maria about her feelings, their conversation is interrupted by Maj. Corrales, the head of police, who asks for his help in taking down a drug syndicate led by Kits that have made orphans Dodong and Caloy unwitting mules for illegal drugs. On a day when Dodong and Caloy are delivering a bird cage discreetly filled with drugs to Kits, Baldo intercepts them and removes the drugs from the cage before they send it to the syndicate. Upon the failed drug transaction, illegal drug seller Paquito decides to deliver the money he earned so far to his paraplegic boss Don Julian at his mansion, only for Baldo and others to catch them in the act and capture the two for the police.

With the impending arrival of Iska's estranged daughter Katrina and her Canadian husband George, Baldo decides to temporarily use Don Julian's mansion to help Iska maintain the illusion that she has grown wealthy in the time Katrina was raised abroad. While the banquet at the mansion is being held, Kits and his syndicate kidnap Dodong and Caloy and calls Don Julian's telephone about their intention of bringing them there, to which Baldo answers with his voice disguised. The drug syndicate arrives at the mansion with Dodong and Caloy but are soon ambushed and summarily beaten up by Baldo's friends at the banquet. Meanwhile, Iska reveals to Katrina that the mansion is not hers, and that she is not actually wealthy, but Katrina is unbothered by this and accepts her for who she is. Katrina and George leave the banquet happy, and Momoy informs Iska that with Don Julian going to jail, the mansion now goes to her name.

Ms. Ramos, a child services woman whom Maria kept seeing with Baldo, arrives at Iska's restaurant to mention to Baldo that Dodong's papers as an orphan have all been settled, thus no longer needing to be placed in the care of social services, and that she will go to the United States soon. After Ms. Ramos leaves, Maria, who heard their conversation, excitedly embraces Baldo to the chagrin of Tikboy.

== Cast ==
- Fernando Poe Jr. as Baldomero "Baldo" Dimaguiba
- Maricel Soriano as Maria
- Sheryl Cruz as Sonea
- Manilyn Reynes as Mona
- Kristina Paner as Caring
- Chuckie Dreyfus as Dodong
- Christopher Paloma as Caloy
- Mel Martinez as Totoy
- Anita Linda as Francisca "Iska" Abubakar
- Rez Cortez as Tikboy
- Dencio Padilla as Momoy "Lugaw" David
- Paquito Diaz as Kits
- Bomber Moran as Rading
- Bayani Casimiro as Mang Paquito
- Bella Flores as Mila
- Augusto Victa as Miniong
- Tony Carreon as Don Julian
- Tina Loy as Auring
- Jose Romulo as Maj. Corrales
- Karim Kiram as Minero
- Rudy Meyer as Sgt. Lolomboy
- Abbo dela Cruz as Daga
- Geena Sablan as Ms. Ramos
- Dedes Whitaker as Katrina
- David Anderson as George
- Goons:
  - Nonoy de Guzman
  - Rene Hawkins
  - Eddie Tuazon
  - Belo Borja
  - Bert Garon
  - Bebot Davao
  - Renato Tanchingco
  - Boy Sta. Maria
  - Eddie Samonte
  - Romy Nario
  - Victor Bravo
  - Mario Caverio
  - Bebeng Amora
  - Jun Montano
  - Ernie David
  - Ronnie Olivas
  - Joe Estrada
  - George Wendth
  - Edgar Madriaga

== Remake ==
On December 5, 2022, Coco Martin was confirmed to star, direct, write, and to co-produce in the Batang Quiapo television remake as its lead character, Tanggol. The series began airing on February 13, 2023 and ended on March 13, 2026.
