= A Love Story (2007 film) =

- Theatrical movie poster
- Directed by: Maryo J. de los Reyes
- Written by: Vanessa Valdez
- Produced by: Charo Santos-Concio; Malou N. Santos; Elma S. Medua; Carmi Raymundo
- Starring: Maricel Soriano; Aga Muhlach; Angelica Panganiban
- Cinematography: Gary Gardoce
- Edited by: Tara Illenberger
- Music by: Jesse Lucas
- Production company: Star Cinema
- Distributed by: Star Cinema
- Release date: August 15, 2007
- Running time: 117 minutes
- Country: Philippines
- Language: Filipino
- Box office: ₱139,611,177.10

A Love Story is a 2007 Filipino romantic drama film directed by Maryo J. de los Reyes from a story and screenplay written by Vanessa Valdez. Starring Aga Muhlach, Maricel Soriano, and Angelica Panganiban, the film revolves around a successful but emotionally scarred businessman Ian Montes, who is torn between two women: Joanna, a doctor and Karyn, a flight attendant.

Produced and distributed by Star Cinema, the film was theatrically released in the Philippines on August 15, 2007, and in the United States on August 26. The film was digitally restored and remastered by the ABS-CBN Film Restoration Project and Central Digital Lab; the restored version was premiered digitally through KTX.ph on August 17, 2021.

== Plot ==
What if you met the woman you wanted to make your wife after you married someone else? Ian Montes is a picture of success. Despite being the son of a shipping tycoon, Ian refused to just coast on his father's empire; he built his own real estate company and earned his first million at a very young age. He has never looked back since then. Driven by his ambition to become better than, if not as good as his father, Ian managed to make it on his own. But behind all the glory is a man yearning for love and recognition. Wounded from his mother's abandonment when he was 17 and desperate for his father's approval, Ian longed for someone who could and would love him unconditionally. He felt this twice when he met two particular women: Joanna and Karyn.

Joanna Villanueva is a picture of quiet confidence and success. Healing from heartbreak caused by an errant ex-husband, Joanna found love again when she rescued Ian from a water-skiing accident in La Union. Being a doctor, Joanna nurtured Ian and showered him with love and attention. With Joanna, Ian found the home he sorely missed and a life of bliss he never thought he could have. But there is also Karyn Torres, a flight attendant, he met en route to Macau for a business trip. At 24, Karyn is the epitome of youthful sensuality and worldliness. With Karyn, every moment is filled with excitement and spontaneity. With Karyn, Ian found the life he'd always wanted. So he's left with a choice. In the end, Ian, Joanna and Karyn painfully learn the true meaning of unconditional love and forgiveness.

== Cast and characters ==
=== Main cast ===
- Maricel Soriano as Joanna Villanueva
- Aga Muhlach as Ian Montes
- Angelica Panganiban as Karyn Torres

=== Supporting cast ===
- Dante Rivero as Sergio Montes
- Chin Chin Gutierrez as Concha
- Bobby Andrews as Roy
- TJ Trinidad as Rick Montes
- Baron Geisler as Macky
- John Arcilla as Steve
- Gerald Madrid as Jake Villanueva
- Mark Acueza as Jason
- Bart Guingona as Hector Villanueva
- R.S. Francisco as Dr. Philip
- Anita Linda as Inang Sion
- Eva Darren as Delia
- Ara Hanesh as Claudia
- Sophia Baars as Joanna's niece
- Charee Pineda
- Dianne Medina
- Carla Humphries

== Reception ==
=== Box office ===
A Love Story has grossed ₱139,611,177.10 and it ran for 8 weeks. A Love Story was ranked number one in 3 weeks, beating the Hollywood movie Bourne Ultimatum starring Matt Damon which also premiered August 15, 2007.

=== Critical reception ===
Jayson B. Brizuela, writing for Philippine Daily Inquirer, gave a positive review and praised the acting performances of the lead cast, the screenplay, and Delos Reyes' direction. He stated that the film "has all the ingredients of a great Pinoy movie that might compare with a Hollywood flick."

=== Accolades ===
Award-Giving Body	Category	Recipient	Result
38th GMMSF Box-Office Entertainment Awards	Film Actor of the Year	Aga Muhlach	Won
38th GMMSF Box-Office Entertainment Awards	Film Actress of the Year	Maricel Soriano	Won
24th PMPC Star Awards for Movies	Movie Original Screenplay of the Year	Vanessa Valdez	Won
Film Academy of the Philippines Luna Awards	Best Picture	A Love Story	Won
Film Academy of the Philippines Luna Awards	Best Director	Marjo J. Delos Reyes	Won
Film Academy of the Philippines Luna Awards	Best Supporting Actress	Angelica Panganiban	Won
Film Academy of the Philippines Luna Awards	Best Supporting Actor	Dante Rivero	Won
