= Florinda (TV series) =

2009 Philippine television drama series

- Title Card
- Genre: Reality; Drama; Horror; Action
- Created by: ABS-CBN Studios; Rico Bello Omagap
- Directed by: Rahyan Carlos
- Starring: Maricel Soriano
- Country of origin: Philippines
- Original language: Filipino
- No. of episodes: 20

Production
- Executive producer: Susan Roces
- Production company: Dreamscape Entertainment Television

Original release
- Network: ABS-CBN
- Release: September 7 – October 2, 2009

Florinda is a 2009 Philippine television drama horror series broadcast by ABS-CBN. Based on a 1973 Philippine film of the same title, the series is the third and final installment of Sineserye Presents: The Susan Roces Cinema Collection. Directed by Rahyan Carlos, it stars Maricel Soriano. It aired on the network's Primetime Bida line up and worldwide on TFC from September 7 to October 2, 2009, replacing The Wedding and was replaced by Pinoy Big Brother: Double Up.

This series is currently streaming on Jeepney TV YouTube Channel every 7:00 pm, replacing Lorenzo's Time.

== Overview ==
=== Film ===
Florinda is a 1973 suspense thriller. It was serialized in Tagalog Klasiks and was written by Rico Bello-Omagap and the movie was directed by Armando Herrera. The film starred Susan Roces in the title role, Florinda. The ensemble cast also includes Dante Rivero, Rosemarie Gil, Ramil Rodriguez, and the late Jay Ilagan. The Film revolves on an avenging love between the titular character, Florinda and the man she truly loves - Rodrigo (in the remake renamed as Ramil) but one day before their wedding, an unlikely disappearance begins with Rodrigo which causes Florinda to panic but one night she will finally find out all the dark secrets locked within their new home. Strange things start to happen and she is being haunted by strange and disturbing dreams, including a ghostly corpse of a man. She soon realizes that there is something evil lurking beneath the old house.

=== Installment ===
Florinda is a final installment of The Susan Roces Cinema Collection in which genres Susan Roces' classic blockbuster suspense films turned into a four-week primetime series of the Queen of Philippine Movies.

== Synopsis ==
Ramil requests Florinda to help him restore his ancestral home. On their site visit, Florinda relives painful memories she once had there. It seems Ramil's mother, Doña Cristina, greatly disapproves of her relationship with the lad, so the old lady persistently sets them apart up until her final breath. Despite his mother's refusal, Ramil decides to ask Florinda's hand in marriage. Surprisingly, even from her grave, Doña Cristina openly expresses her displeasure. On the day of the wedding, Ramil fails to show up; immediately, Florinda goes in search. With no idea where her groom could have gone, Florinda breaks down. Mother and daughter, Criselda and Mara, finally reach Florinda's new-found home after accepting Ramil's job offer a few days back. Florinda instantly recognizes the Criselda from the past, since the said lady used to serve Ramil's family. On the other hand, upon learning about her sister Florinda's paranormal experiences, Rachelle consults an expert. To her surprise, the professional confirms that there is, in fact, a vengeful spirit residing in their new home.

Rachelle's friends Gladys and Archie only played a trick on her: The paranormal experience they have encountered is merely an act the two staged. On the other hand, Florinda somehow feels Doña Cristina persistently haunting her, but she puts the thought aside. Despite the rather unusual experiences, she continues to go in search for her missing groom, thus making other people think that she is gradually losing her mind. Aware of her sister's current state, Rachelle then tries to convince Florinda to undergo psychological treatment. Instead of being thankful for her sister's support, Florinda furiously exclaims that she is not ill. Florinda finally grows convinced that there is a bothered spirit residing in her house after Caloy confirmed her story. Immediately, she consults her housemaid Criselda regarding the matter. Aside from Criselda, Florinda also informs Eric; she relays to the policeman all the information she had gathered from Caloy, including the fact that the kid saw Ramil enter the house.

Rachelle is starting to grow impatient of her sister who keeps on insisting about Donya Cristina's bothered soul roaming around. It is shown at a part on the series that Criselda loved Ramil and wanted marry him. So for her, killing Florinda is the only way to marry Ramil. A killing begins to her wrath of murdering Florinda, killing Florinda and Rachelle's trusted people. When Ramil escapes from Criselda, she finds the chance to stab Florinda. But when Criselda nearly stabs Florinda, the ghost of Doña Cristina appeared to her. In the end, Criselda goes to a mental prison, while Mara is imprisoned for being an accomplice when she helped Florinda, Rachelle and Ramil escape. Florinda is in a hospital due to the stab to her leg and refuses Ramil's offer of marriage. She makes Rachelle the caretaker of the house. When Florinda finally went out of hospital, she prays at a church and finds Caloy. To her surprise, she finally knew that Caloy was a ghost and they lived happily ever after.

== Cast and characters ==
=== Main cast ===
- Maricel Soriano as Florinda Arguelles
- Jay Manalo as Ramil Gonzales
- Cherry Pie Picache as Criselda Bautista

=== Host ===
- Susan Roces as Introducer

=== Supporting cast ===
- Roxanne Guinoo as Rachelle Arguelles
- Nikki Gil as Mara Bautista
- Zanjoe Marudo as Archie
- William Martinez as Eric
- Pooh Garcia as George
- Chen Zenhric Dimayuga as Caloy
- Shirley Fuentes as Sally

=== Special participation ===
- Carla Martinez as Doña Cristina Gonzales

== Award ==
- 2010 PMPC Star Awards for Television's "Best Drama Actress" - Maricel Soriano

== See also ==
- List of programs broadcast by ABS-CBN
- Sineserye Presents
