= Vampira (1994 film) =

- Directed by: Joey Romero
- Screenplay by: Wali Ching
- Story by: Don Escudero
- Produced by: Lily Y. Monteverde
- Starring: Maricel Soriano; Christopher de Leon
- Cinematography: Charlie Peralta
- Edited by: Danny Gloria
- Music by: Jaime Fabregas
- Production company: Regal Films
- Distributed by: Regal Films
- Release date: October 26, 1994
- Running time: 115 minutes
- Country: Philippines
- Languages: Filipino; Tagalog

Vampira is a 1994 Filipino horror film directed by Joey Romero and starring Maricel Soriano and Christopher de Leon. The film "chronicles a woman vampire's valiant search for redemption as she shifts her practice from the clandestine acts of bloodsucking to the assumption of the public role of woman".

== Synopsis ==
Cara has a grave mission to break the horrible curse that has been keeping her family lurking in the dark for a very long time. Yet all her plans were stalled when she unexpectedly found love in the arms of a humble architect, Arman. To hide her dark past from him, Cara is forced to reinvent herself and changes her name to Paz. Everything seemed blissful until one fateful night, Arman shockingly discovers the truth upon seeing Cara's blood drenched mouth and arms.

Unfortunately, time is running out for Cara and she has to find a way to end the curse before she and her beloved clan completely turn into blood hungry immortals. But Cara needs to face and stop the fury of her power hungry brother, Miguel who relishes on turning the world into pitch black darkness. As she finds herself pitted between life and death, Cara soon realizes that love and forgiveness shall be her only salvation to survive.

== Cast ==
- Maricel Soriano
- Christopher de Leon
- Caridad Sanchez
- Joanne Quintas
- Jayvee Gayoso
- Lorli Villanueva
- Boy 2 Quizon
- Nida Blanca

== Awards ==
The film was named Best Film by the Young Critics Circle Film Desk and has earned Maricel Soriano the best performer award from the same body. Nida Blanca who received FAMAS Best Supporting Actress nomination for her role as Maricel's mother in the movie.
