= Babaing Hampaslupa =

1988 Filipino film starring Maricel Soriano

- Official movie poster
- Directed by: Mel Chionglo
- Written by: Ricardo Lee
- Starring: Janice de Belen; Gina Alajar; Richard Gomez; Edu Manzano; Rowell Santiago; Liza Lorena; Leni Santos; Carmina Villarroel; Maricel Soriano
- Cinematography: Ricardo Jacinto; Rody Lacap
- Edited by: Efren Jarlego
- Music by: Max Jocson
- Production company: Regal Films
- Release date: November 16, 1988
- Running time: 122 minutes
- Country: Philippines
- Languages: Filipino; English

Babaing Hampaslupa (Note: The standard spelling is "babae", but the film spells it as "babai".) (lit. 'Vagabond Woman') is a 1988 Filipino romantic drama film directed by Mel Chionglo, written by Ricardo Lee, and starring Maricel Soriano as the titular vagabond Remy. It also stars Gina Alajar, Janice de Belen, Richard Gomez, Edu Manzano, Rowell Santiago, Liza Lorena, Leni Santos, and Carmina Villarroel. Produced by Regal Films, the film was released on November 16, 1988. Critic Lav Diaz gave the film a positive review, especially praising the first third for its intense melodrama and realism.

== Cast ==
- Maricel Soriano as Remedios
- Gina Alajar as Desiree
- Janice de Belen as Eden
- Richard Gomez as Jimmy
- Edu Manzano as Vincent
- Rowell Santiago as Mario
- Liza Lorena as Nita
- Leni Santos as Edna
- Carmina Villarroel as Fe
- Anita Linda as Aling Ising
- Mario Escudero as Ka Indo
- Bing Davao as Crispin
- Vangie Labalan as mother of Carling
- Evelyn Vargas as Irma
- Tita de Villa as Kasera
- Aida Carmona as restaurant owner
- Alma Lerma as Aling Leonor
- Malu de Guzman as Nancy
- Hazel Atuel as Marilyn
- Elaine Eleazar as Melissa
- Sylvia Garde as Bekang
- Joe Jardi as Tana
- Rosanna Jover as Cathy
- Bon Vivar as Vincent's father
- Lollie Mara as Vincent's mother
- Lucy Quinto as Aling Naty
- Josie Galvez as Cathy's mother
- Eva Ramos as Miss Ramos
- Maribel Legarda as Joy

== Production ==
Eric Quizon was originally cast as Soriano's love interest, though he ultimately backed out of the project. Quizon would coincidentally later direct the similarly titled 2011 telenovela Babaeng Hampaslupa for TV5.

== Release ==
Babaing Hampaslupa was released in the Philippines on November 16, 1988.

=== Critical response ===
Lav Diaz, writing for the Manila Standard, gave Babaing Hampaslupa a positive review, especially praising the first third of the film for its intense melodrama and realism, while expressing disappointment that the remaining two-thirds succumbed to commercialism. Diaz concluded that as a drama, the film is a great demonstration of good acting.

== Accolades ==
Group	Category	Name	Result
FAMAS Awards	Best Actress	Maricel Soriano	Nominated
FAMAS Awards	Best Supporting Actress	Gina Alajar	Nominated
