= Vietnam Rose =

Philippine television drama series

- Title card
- Also known as: Hoa hồng Việt Nam
- Genre: Drama; Romance
- Created by: Desirey Fernandez - Joan
- Developed by: Dado Lumibao (concept development head)
- Written by: Ricky Lee; Arah Jell Badayos
- Directed by: Joel Lamangan; Don Cuaresma
- Starring: Maricel Soriano; Assunta De Rossi; Angelica Panganiban; John Estrada; Jason Abalos
- Theme music composer: Arnie Mendaros
- Ending theme: "Magpahanggang Wakas" by Martin Nievera
- Country of origin: Philippines
- Original languages: Tagalog; Vietnamese
- No. of episodes: 105

Production
- Executive producer: Desirey Fernandez-Juan
- Producer: Cathy Ochoa-Perez
- Production locations: Philippines; Ho Chi Minh City, Vietnam
- Animators: Pocholo Eleazer; Rodolfo Tinapay; Vincent Cheng; Edcel Yanga; Kathlyn Salazar
- Editors: Ferdie Panghulan; Jesus Mendoza Jr.
- Running time: 20-38 minutes

Original release
- Network: ABS-CBN
- Release: September 19, 2005 – February 10, 2006

Vietnam Rose (Vietnamese: Hoa hồng Việt Nam) is a Philippine television drama series broadcast by ABS-CBN. Directed by Joel Lamangan and Don Cuaresma, it stars Maricel Soriano, Assunta de Rossi, Angelica Panganiban, John Estrada and Jason Abalos. It aired on the network's Primetime Bida line up from September 19, 2005 to February 10, 2006, replacing Green Rose.

The series is currently streaming on Jeepney TV's YouTube Channel started on June 1, 2026 at a timeslot of 8:00 PM replacing Berks.

== Synopsis ==
Vietnam Rose follows the journey of Đặng Thiên Ý, a Vietnamese woman and survivor of the Vietnam War. The show's narratives focuses on the consequences of the separation of family members due to the war as opposed to patriotisms associated with it. Yểu went to the Philippines and grew into Carina Mojica dela Cerna, a successful businesswoman who is married to an influential man (played by John Estrada).

To face her past, she goes back to Vietnam to face her mother. Here, Carina meets her half-sister, Đoàn Thiên Tín (played by Angelica Panganiban).

== Cast and Characters ==
Main cast

- Maricel Soriano as Carina Mojica dela Cerna (Đoàn Thiên Ý)
- John Estrada as Alexander "Alex" dela Cerna
- Assunta de Rossi as Adriana (mistress of Alex)
- Jason Abalos as JR Hernandez (Enrico's son)
- Angelica Panganiban as Đoàn Thiên Tín
- Jay Manalo as Miguel Cruz (Lê Đình Hoàng)
- Ricky Davao as Enrico Hernandez
- Gina Alajar as Amanda Hernandez
- Baron Geisler as Nguyễn Vũ Phong/Billy (Isabel's father/young Vietnamese)
- AJ Dee as Trần Hạnh Trinh
- Joseph Bitangcol as Paolo Custodio
- Michelle Madrigal as Faith dela Cerna
- Chanda Romero as Vida Mojica
- Rosa Rosal as Editha dela Cerna

Supporting cast

- Jim Pebanco as Armando Custodio
- Ilonah Jean as Emilia Custodio
- Tony Mabesa as Fidel dela Cerna
- Lollie Mara as Luz
- Janelle Quintana as Patricia

Special Participation

- Luis Alandy as Carina's father
- Karlyn Bayot
- Kristopher Peralta as Young Enrico Hernandez
- Joshua Dionisio as Young Lê Đình Hoàng (Miguel)
- Kyline Alcantara as Young Carina dela Cerna (Thiên Ý lúc nhỏ)
- Edna Mae Landico
- Gilette Sandico as Đặng Như Ý (mẹ của Thiên Ý)
- Carla Humphries as Young Editha dela Cerna
- Debraliz Valasote
- Maricar de Mesa
- Giselle Sanchez
- Spanky Manikan
- Mico Aytona
- Ernie Zarate
- Rolando Inocencio
- Allyson Lualhati

== Awards ==
Soriano won The 20th PMPC Star Awards for Television Best Actress award for Vietnam Rose.

== See also ==
- List of shows previously aired by ABS-CBN
- List of ABS-CBN drama series
