= T2 (2009 film) =

2009 Filipino supernatural horror film

- Theatrical release poster
- Directed by: Chito S. Roño
- Screenplay by: Aloy Adlawan; Chito S. Roño
- Story by: Chris Martinez; Chito S. Roño
- Produced by: Tess V. Fuentes
- Starring: Maricel Soriano; Mika Dela Cruz; Derek Ramsay
- Cinematography: Eli Balce
- Edited by: Manet Dayrit
- Music by: Carmina Robles-Cuya
- Production companies: Star Cinema; Roadrunner Films
- Distributed by: Star Cinema
- Release date: April 11, 2009
- Running time: 100 minutes
- Country: Philippines
- Language: Filipino
- Box office: ₱95 million

T2 (also known as Tenement 2) is a 2009 Filipino supernatural horror film directed by Chito S. Roño and starring Maricel Soriano. "T2" refers to Tenement 2, one of the buildings in Barangay Western Bicutan in Taguig where some of the scenes were shot. In the film, Maricel Soriano plays a travel agent and Save an Orphan Foundation volunteer who brings an orphan home only to discover that the girl comes from a family of Engkantos.

Produced and distributed by Star Cinema, the film was released on April 11, 2009.

== Plot ==
Airline agent Claire and Elias pick up Angeli, who is scheduled to be adopted. Upon arriving at Tenement 2, where Angeli's new parents are staying, they only find Tess, Melissa and Domeng. Angeli pleads with Claire to not leave her no matter what happens, and writes a letter to her which is not to be read until a specified time.

As Elias searches for the sleeping Angeli and Claire, he is attacked and killed by entities. Claire wakes up to find Angeli missing and searches for her only to find Elias' corpse. She then finds Angeli being possessed only to be awaken back to her consciousness through Claire's presence. Angeli pleads again Claire not to leave her and decides to escape the building but are overwhelmed and separated by a huge swarm of rats summoned by the entities. Claire is saved by a mysterious lady using her magic lamp. The lady then tells her to run quickly and be ready before midnight (which is three in the morning for the entities, which was revealed are Fairies).

Angeli is taken by the fairies while the lady explains to Claire the truth about Angeli and the fairies. She reveals that she too had a child with a fairy whom she raised in the human world but was taken by the fairies to their world when she reached the age of nine as per the fairies' customs. The lady tells Claire not to let Angeli be taken away as it is believed that love nor emotion do not exist in the fairy world. Both decided to go back where Angeli's room and find her letters as they encounter monsters on their way to the fairy world, where the lady finally found her child, who rejects her believing that she doesn't have any family in their dimension.

Isabel, one of the fairies, introduces herself as Angeli's mother and tells Angeli's backstory. Claire's husband Jeremy searches for Claire in the building as everyone awaits for Angeli's decision. But before she decides, she is confronted by Claire who reads the letters and memories of her life with her human father who was blinded after the apparent death of his fairy wife, which occurred after her true identity was revealed. Angeli then breaks down remembering her father.

The fairies then challenges Claire for Angeli or Jeremy's lives. Angered, Angeli then threatens her mother that she will not join them upon reaching adulthood unless they guarantee not to harm Jeremy, to which the fairies agree. The lady then kills all the fairies using a potion before being overwhelmed by a rat swarm. They then wake up in real life being found by Jeremy.

Afterwards, Angeli is adopted by Claire and Jeremy and goes to her new school where she encounters fairies and her fairy mother, who turns out to be her teacher.

== Cast ==
- Maricel Soriano as Claire
- Mika Dela Cruz as Angeli
- Derek Ramsay as Jeremy
- Eric Fructuoso as Elias
- Tetchie Agbayani as Rita
- Camille Prats as Tess
- K Brosas as Melissa
- Mon Confiado as Domeng
- Carmen Soo as Isabel
- John Lloyd Cruz as Gary
- Julia Montes as Rita's daughter
- Evangeline Pascual as Mrs. Villamin
- Mosang as Manghihilot

== Reception ==
=== Box office ===
T2 was a commercial success. The film earned ₱28 million in its first two days and over ₱75 million in box-office receipts within its first two weeks.

=== Critical response ===
T2 was graded B by the Cinema Evaluation Board.

== See also ==
- Star Cinema
