= Mother Nanny =

Inang Yaya
- Theatrical movie poster
- Directed by: Pablo Biglang-awa; Veronica Velasco
- Written by: Veronica Velasco
- Produced by: Tony Gloria
- Starring: Maricel Soriano
- Cinematography: Gary Gardoce
- Edited by: Randy Gabriel
- Music by: Nonong Buencamino
- Production company: Unitel Pictures
- Distributed by: Unitel Pictures
- Release date: November 29, 2006
- Running time: 99 Minutes
- Country: Philippines
- Language: Filipino

Inang Yaya (released internationally as Mother Nanny) is a 2006 film directed by Pablo Biglang-awa and Veronica Velasco, who wrote the film. The film stars Maricel Soriano as Norma, a nanny who has to choose between Ruby (Tala Santos, her daughter) or Louise (Erika Oreta, the girl who she takes care of). The film won Best Film and Best Performance, awards given by the Young Critics Circle.

== Plot ==
Norma (Maricel Soriano) straddles between being a mother to Ruby (Tala Santos) and being a nanny to her employer's daughter, Louise (Erika Oreta). Norma left her daughter in the province to be a nanny to another person's daughter. An emergency forces Norma to bring Ruby with her to Manila and her employer is kind enough to accept Ruby in the household. However, Louise (Erika Oreta), the daughter of Norma's employer, competes with Ruby for Norma's affection. Now, Norma has to balance her love and attention for the two special people in her life: her daughter and her ward.

== Casts ==
- Maricel Soriano as Norma
- Erika Oreta as Louise
- Tala Santos as Ruby
- Sunshine Cruz as May
- Zoren Legaspi as Noel
- Liza Lorena as Lola Toots
- Marita Zobel as Lola Tersing
- Matthew Mendoza as Mon
- Kalila Aguilos as Luz
- JM Reyes as Carlo
- Jessu Trinidad as Cocoy
- Erica Dehesa as Alexa
- Julia Buencamino as Margarita
- Janneke Agustin as Nana
- Roence Santos as Tess
