= Inday Bote =

2015 Philippine television romantic drama series

- Title card
- Also known as: Pablo S. Gomez's Inday Bote
- Genre: Comedy drama; Fantasy; Romance
- Created by: ABS-CBN Studios; Keiko A. Aquino
- Based on: Inday Bote (Komiks) by Pablo S. Gomez
- Developed by: ABS-CBN Studios; Roldeo T. Endrinal; Julie Anne R. Benitez; Rondel P. Lindayag
- Written by: Danica Mae S. Domingo; David Franche Diuco; Hazel Karyl A. Madanguit; Robert P. Raz
- Directed by: Malu L. Sevilla; Jon S. Villarin; Manny Q. Palo
- Creative director: Johnny delos Santos
- Starring: Alex Gonzaga; Alonzo Muhlach; Matteo Guidicelli; Kean Cipriano
- Opening theme: "Eh Di Wow!" by Vice Ganda
- Composer: Vice Ganda
- Country of origin: Philippines
- Original languages: Filipino; English; Japanese
- No. of episodes: 53

Production
- Executive producers: Carlo L. Katigbak; Cory V. Vidanes; Laurenti M. Dyogi; Roldeo T. Endrinal; Cathy Magdael-Abarrondo
- Producer: Ethel Manaloto-Espiritu
- Production location: Quezon City
- Editor: Marion Bautista
- Running time: 30-45 minutes
- Production company: Dreamscape Magical Summer

Original release
- Network: ABS-CBN
- Release: March 16 – May 29, 2015

Inday Bote (transl. Inday Bottle) is a 2015 Philippine television drama romance series broadcast by ABS-CBN. The series is based on the local comic book of the same title created by Pablo S. Gomez. Directed by Malu L. Sevilla, Jon S. Villarin and Manny Q. Palo, it stars Alex Gonzaga, Alonzo Muhlach, Matteo Guidicelli and Kean Cipriano. It aired on the network's Primetime Bida line up and worldwide on TFC from March 16 to May 29, 2015, replacing Bagito and was replaced by Pasión de Amor.

The series is streaming online on YouTube.

== Cast and characters ==
=== Main cast ===
- Alex Gonzaga as Inday Catacutan / Kristal Delgado
- Alonzo Muhlach as Entoy
- Matteo Guidicelli as Greg Navarro
- Kean Cipriano as Jerome Santiago
- Nikki Valdez as Mimi
- Smokey Manaloto as Teroy
- Nanding Josef as Nilo

=== Supporting cast ===
- Aiko Melendez as Fiona Vargas-Navarro
- Alicia Alonzo as Lita Vargas
- Malou Crisologo as Siony Catacutan
- Jeffrey Santos as Mike Navarro
- Izzy Canillo as Anthony "Onyong" Catacutan
- Alora Sasam as Andrea "Andeng" Catacutan
- Tart Carlos as Penelope "Penny" Castro
- Arlene Tolibas as Estelita Santiago/Ramona "Onay" Santiago
- Michael Conan as Roger
- Mico Palanca as Robert
- Jerry O'Hara as Alfredo

=== Special participation ===
- Mutya Orquia as young Inday
- Gabrielle Nagayama as baby Inday
- Bryce Viray as young Greg
- Steven Ocampo as young Jerome
- Amy Nobleza as young Andeng
- Isabel Oli as young Lita Vargas
- Carla Humphries as Marice Vargas-Delgado
- Bobby Andrews as Angelo Delgado
- Biboy Ramirez as Lucas Catacutan

== Soundtrack ==
- "Eh Di Wow!" by Vice Ganda
- "Panaginip Lang" by Alex Gonzaga
- "Nag-iisa Lang" by Angeline Quinto

== Production ==
=== Cancellation ===
Inday Bote ended because of its low ratings, unlike its predecessor Bagito that garnered 27.2% on its pilot episode, Inday Bote got only a low score of 18.4%. The network decided to cut the story short and ended on May 29, 2015. Making the show's run for only 2 months and 2 weeks with 53 episodes. It was replaced by Pasión de Amor, the Philippine remake of the Colombian telenovela Pasión de Gavilanes and only got high in the show's ratings — unlike the mentioned above's predecessor — during its eight-month run.

== Ratings ==
Kantar Media National TV ratings (5:45PM PST)
PILOT EPISODE	FINALE EPISODE	PEAK	AVERAGE	SOURCE
18.4%	23.1%	23.1%	N/A	

== See also ==
- List of programs broadcast by ABS-CBN
- List of ABS-CBN Studios original drama series
