= List of Regal Entertainment films =

List of theatrical feature films

This is the list of theatrical feature films founded in 1962 owned by Regal Entertainment.

== 1970s ==
- Kayod Sa Umaga, Kayod Sa Gabi (1974)
- Ang Nobya Kong Sexy (1975, co-production with Lea Productions)

=== 1976 ===
| Title | Release date | Director | Cast | Genre(s) | Associated film production |
|---|---|---|---|---|---|
| Magsikap: Kayod sa Araw, Kayod sa Gabi | February 9 | Luciano B. Carlos | Gina Pareño, Elizabeth Oropesa, Orestes Ojeda and Ronaldo Valdez | Drama | |
| Walang Karanasan | June 4 | Arsenio Bautista | Alma Moreno, George Estregan and Eddie Garcia | Drama | |
| Peter Pandesal | November 25 | Luciano B. Carlos | Niño Muhlach, Ramon Zamora and Imelda Ilanan | Action, comedy | D'Wonder Films |

- Pang Umaga, Pang Tanghali, Pang Gabi (1977)
- Wow, Sikat! Pare, Bigat! (1977)
- Beerhouse (1977)
- Panakip Butas (1977)
- Disco Baby (1977)
- Sugar Daddy (1977)
- Hamog (1978)
- Iwasan... Kabaret (1978)
- Kambal Dragon (1978; released under the Good Harvest Unlimited Inc. label, co-production with Archer Films)
- Facundo Alitaftaf (1978)
- Mahal Mo, Mahal Ko (1978)
- Lagi na Lamang ba Akong Babae? (1978)
- Boy Apache (1978)

=== 1979 ===
| Title | Release date | Director | Cast | Genre(s) | Associated film production |
|---|---|---|---|---|---|
| Disgrasyada | January 12 | Elwood Perez | Rio Locsin, Rolly Quizon, Ronald Corveau, Subas Herrero and Johnny Wilson | Comedy and romance | |
| Darna, Kuno? | March 30 | Luciano B. Carlos | Dolphy, Lotis Key | Action, comedy, and fantasy | |
| Salawahan | September 21 | Ishmael Bernal | Rio Locsin, Rita Gomez, Jay Ilagan, Mat Ranillo III, Sandy Andolong and Mark Gil | Comedy and romance | |

== 1980s ==
=== 1980 ===
| Title | Release date | Director | Cast | Genre(s) | Associated film production |
|---|---|---|---|---|---|
| Love Affair | January 11 | Cloyd Robinson | Rio Locsin and Al Tantay | Drama, romance | |
| Problem Child | February 1 | Elwood Perez | Cherie Gil, Lloyd Samartino and Rosemarie Gil | Comedy, drama | |
| Nympha | March 7 | Joey Gosiengfiao | Alma Moreno, Ricky Belmonte and Alfie Anido | Drama | |
| Magnong Barumbado | April 25 | Nilo Saez | Lito Lapid, Roberto Gonzalez, George Estregan, Ruel Vernal, Dick Israel and Cherie Gil | | |
| Uhaw Sa Kalayaan | June 6 | Arsenio Bautista | Alma Moreno, Amy Austria, Alfie Anido and Lorna Tolentino | Drama | |
| Temptation Island | July 4 | Joey Gosiengfiao | Azenith Briones, Jennifer Cortez, Deborah Sun, Bambi Arambulo and Dina Bonnevie | | |
| Katorse | July 23 | Joey Gosiengfiao | Dina Bonnevie, Alfie Anido and Gabby Concepcion | | |
| Wild Animal | August 15 | Lando Jacob | Rio Locsin, Al Tantay, Gloria Diaz | | |
| Diborsiyada | August 19 | Elwood Perez | Gina Alajar, Michael De Mesa and Jimi Melendez | | |
| I Am Sorry | October 17 | Joey Gosiengfiao | Dina Bonnevie, Snooky Serna, Gabby Concepcion and Maricel Soriano | Drama | |
| Waikiki | November 14 | Elwood Perez | Alma Moreno, Rio Locsin, Ricky Belmonte and Lorna Tolentino | Romance, drama | |
| Los Angeles by Night/City After Dark | November 28 | Ishmael Bernal | Blu Gunderson, Rafael Gunderson, Pedro Gunderson and Nigel Clement | Drama | |

=== 1981 ===
- Blue Jeans
- Totoo Ba ang Tsismis?
- Oh, My Mama!
- Bata Pa si Sabel
- I Confess
- Pabling
- Bilibid Gays (produced under the Good Harvest Unlimited Inc. label)
- Bakit Ba Ganyan?
- Hello, Young Lovers (co-production with Lea Productions)
- Hulihin si Pepeng Magtanggol (produced under the Good Harvest Unlimited Inc. label)
- Summer Love
- Kasalanan Ba?
- Mag-Toning Muna Tayo (produced under the Good Harvest Unlimited Inc. label)
- Caught in the Act

=== 1982 ===
| Title | Release date | Director | Cast | Genre(s) | Associated film production |
|---|---|---|---|---|---|
| Throw Away Child | January 8 | Arsenio Bautista | Alma Moreno, Dina Bonnevie and Alfie Anido | Drama | |
| Schoolgirls | January 29 | Maryo J. de los Reyes | Snooky Serna, Dina Bonnevie, Maricel Soriano and Edu Manzano | | |
| First Kiss, First Love | February 12 | Joey Gosiengfiao | Snooky Serna and Albert Martinez | Romance | |
| Galawgaw | March 12 | Ishmael Bernal | Maricel Soriano and William Martinez | Romantic comedy, drama | |
| Ito Ba ang Ating Mga Anak? | March 26 | Ishmael Bernal | Lloyd Samartino, William Martinez and Albert Martinez | Drama | |
| Mother Dear | June 4 | Lino Brocka | Charito Solis, Gloria Romero, Nestor de Villa, Snooky Serna, William Martinez, Albert Martinez, Julie Vega and Maricel Soriano | Drama | |
| Relasyon | July 2 | Ishmael Bernal | Vilma Santos, Christopher De Leon | Drama | |
| Hindi Kita Malimot | July 16 | Ishmael Bernal | Maricel Soriano, William Martinez | Comedy, drama, romance | |
| Anak | July 30 | Mel Chionglo | Christopher De Leon, Lloyd Samartino, Dina Bonnevie | | |
| No Other Love | August 13 | Joey Gosiengfiao | Snooky Serna, Albert Martinez, Nora Aunor, Christopher De Leon | Romance, drama | |
| Diosa | August 13 | Maryo J. de los Reyes | Lorna Tolentino, Lloyd Samartino, Alfie Anido | Drama | |
| Diary of Cristina Gaston | September 24 | Joey Gosiengfiao | Alma Moreno, Alfie Anido, Jimi Melendez, Albert Martinez | Drama | |
| Story of Three Loves | October 10 | Joey Gosiengfiao | Snooky Serna, Maricel Soriano, Lani Mercado, Gabby Concepcion, William Martinez, Albert Martinez | Drama | |
| Boystown | November 5 | Marilou Diaz-Abaya | William Martinez, Edgar Mande, Raoul Casado, Peewee Quijano, Eddie Boy Tuazon and Gabby Concepcion | Drama | |
| Kumander Melody | November 19 | Zoilo Romero Jr. | Ramon Revilla | Action | |
| I Love You, I Hate You | December 3 | Mel Chionglo | Maricel Soriano and William Martinez | Romantic comedy | |
| Santa Claus Is Coming To Town | December 25 | Elwood Perez | Snooky Serna, Maricel Soriano, Gabby Concepcion, William Martinez, Albert Martinez | Comedy, drama, romance | |

=== 1983 ===
- Strangers in Paradise
- Warren Balane (released under the Good Harvest Unlimited Inc. label)
- To Mama with Love
- Babae, Ikaw Ba'y Makasalanan?
- Pepe en Pilar
- Shame
- Mortal Sin
- Summer Holiday
- Broken Marriage
- Don't Cry for Me, Papa
- Minsan May Isang Ina

=== 1984 ===
| Title | Release date | Director | Cast | Genre(s) | Associated film production |
|---|---|---|---|---|---|
| Uhaw Sa Pag-ibig | January 26 | Mario O'Hara | Claudia Zobel, Edgar Mande, Patrick Dela Rosa, Lito Pimentel | Drama | |
| Tender Age | February 14 | Joey Gosiengfiao | Eddie Rodriguez. Dina Bonnevie and Carmi Martin | Drama, comedy | |
| Sinner or Saint | March 7 | Mel Chionglo | Claudia Zobel, Charito Solis and Gloria Romero | Drama | |
| Where Love Has Gone | March 8 | Joey Gosiengfiao | Amalia Fuentes, Charito Solis, Eddie Rodriguez and Julie Vega | Drama | |
| Dear Mama | May 3 | Mel Chionglo | Snooky Serna, Manilyn Reynes, Julie Vega, Janice de Belen and Charito Solis | Drama | |
| Adultery | June 1 | Lino Brocka | Vilma Santos, Phillip Salvador and Mario Montenegro | Drama | |
| Daddy's Little Darlings | June 15 | Luciano B. Carlos | Dolphy, Coney Reyes, Snooky Serna, Maricel Soriano, Julie Vega and Janice de Belen | Comedy, drama | |
| 14 Going Steady | September 6 | Joey Gosiengfiao | Gretchen Barretto, Janice de Belen and Nadia Montenegro | Drama, romantic comedy | |
| Anak ni Waray vs. Anak ni Biday | October 12 | Maryo J. de los Reyes | Nida Blanca, Gloria Romero, Nestor de Villa, Maricel Soriano and Snooky Serna | Romantic comedy | |
| Experience | November 1 | Lino Brocka | Snooky Serna, Miguel Rodriguez, Samuel Valero | Crime, drama, romance | |
| Life Begins at 40 | December 7 | Mike Makiling | Eddie Rodriguez, Eddie Garcia and Gelli de Belen | Comedy | |

=== 1985 ===
| Title | Release date | Director | Cast | Genre(s) | Associated film production |
|---|---|---|---|---|---|
| Ride on Baby | January 11 | Luciano B. Carlos | Tito Sotto, Vic Sotto, Joey de Leon, Dina Bonnevie and Maricel Soriano | Romantic comedy, fantasy | TVJ Productions |
| Bulaklak ng Magdamag | January 25 | Emmanuel Borlaza | Gloria Romero, Eddie Rodriguez and Pilar Pilapil | Drama | |
| Mama Said, Papa Said, I Love You | May 1 | Luciano B. Carlos | Tito Sotto, Vic Sotto, Joey de Leon, Dina Bonnevie and Danica Sotto | Comedy, musical | TVJ Productions |
| Hinugot Sa Langit | June 6 | Ishmael Bernal | Maricel Soriano, Charito Solis, Al Tantay and Dante Rivero | Drama | |
| Scorpio Nights | June 18 | Peque Gallaga | Daniel Fernando, Orestes Ojeda and Anna Marie Gutierrez | Drama, erotic | |
| Inday Bote | August 15 | Luciano B. Carlos | Maricel Soriano, Richard Gomez and Roderick Paulate | Comedy, fantasy, romance | |
| Till We Meet Again | August 29 | Elwood Perez | Nora Aunor, Tirso Cruz III, Dina Bonnevie and Edu Manzano | Romance | |
| I Have Three Hands | September 11 | Luciano B. Carlos | Tito Sotto, Vic Sotto, Joey de Leon and Maricel Soriano | Comedy | TVJ Productions |

=== 1986 ===
| Title | Release date | Director | Cast | Genre(s) | Associated film production |
|---|---|---|---|---|---|
| Super Wan-Tu-Tri | January 1 | Luciano B. Carlos | Tito Sotto, Vic Sotto, Joey de Leon, Ian de Leon, Janice de Belen, Aga Muhlach and Lani Mercado | Comedy, family, fantasy | |
| Unfaithful Wife | January 11 | Peque Gallaga | Michael de Mesa, Joel Torre and Anna Marie Gutierrez | Crime, drama | |
| Yesterday, Today and Tomorrow | January 30 | Emmanuel Borlaza | Vilma Santos, Snooky Serna, Maricel Soriano and Gabby Concepcion | Drama | |
| When I Fall in Love | March 14 | Joey Gosiengfiao | Maricel Soriano, William Martinez, Jackie Lou Blanco, Janice de Belen and Manilyn Reynes | Drama, romantic comedy | |
| The Graduates | April 3 | Ishmael Bernal | Snooky Serna, Gabby Concepcion, Maricel Soriano and William Martinez | Romantic comedy | |
| Horsey-Horsey: Tigidig-Tigidig | May 1 | Luciano B. Carlos | Tito Sotto, Vic Sotto, Joey de Leon, Gary Valenciano and Maricel Soriano | Comedy, musical | |
| I Love You Mama, I Love You Papa | May 29 | Maryo J. de los Reyes | Nora Aunor, Christopher de Leon, Ian de Leon, Joel Torre and Armida Siguion-Reyna | Drama, family | |
| Paalam... Bukas ang Kasal Ko | June 19 | Emmanuel Borlaza | Snooky Serna, Richard Gomez and Miguel Rodriguez | Drama | |
| Inday-Inday Sa Balitaw | August 28 | Luciano B. Carlos | Susan Roces, Eddie Gutierrez, Maricel Soriano and William Martinez | Comedy, family | Magic Adobo Productions |
| Nasaan Ka Nang Kailangan Kita | September 18 | Mel Chionglo | Susan Roces, Hilda Koronel, Snooky Serna and Janice de Belen | Drama | |
| Batang Quiapo | October 16 | Pablo Santiago | Fernando Poe Jr., Maricel Soriano | Comedy, action | |
| Bakit Madalas ang Tibok Ng Puso | November 6 | Danny Zialcita | Janice de Belen, Aga Muhlach, Dante Rivero and Liza Lorena | Drama | |

=== 1987 ===
| Title | Release date | Director | Cast | Genre(s) | Associated film production |
|---|---|---|---|---|---|
| Once Upon A Time | January 4 | Peque Gallaga and Lore Reyes | Dolphy, Gloria Romero, Joel Torre and Janice de Belen | Adventure, comedy, family | |
| Forward March | January 29 | Luciano B. Carlos | Tito Sotto, Vic Sotto, Joey de Leon and Snooky Serna | Comedy, action | |
| Prinsesang Gusgusin | February 5 | Mario O'Hara | Lotlot de Leon, Nida Blanca and Nestor de Villa | Comedy, drama, fantasy | APG Films |
| Jack en Poy: Hale-Hale Hoy | February 25 | Luciano B. Carlos | Maricel Soriano, William Martinez, Jackie Lou Blanco, Janice de Belen and Manilyn Reynes | Comedy | Good Harvest Unlimited Inc. |
| Rosa Mistica | March 3 | Emmanuel Borlaza | Snooky Serna, Liza Lorena and Aga Muhlach | Drama, fantasy | |
| Bunsong Kerubin | May 1 | Luciano B. Carlos | Susan Roces, Matet de Leon, Lotlot de Leon and Ronaldo Valdez | Comedy, drama, family | |
| Remember Me, Mama | May 15 | Mel Chionglo | Eddie Gutierrez, Pilar Pilapil, Liza Lorena and Raymond Lauchengco | Drama | |
| Stolen Moments | May 29 | Emmanuel Borlaza | Alma Moreno, Rio Locsin and Rey PJ Abellana | Drama | |
| Mga Lahing Pikutin | June 3 | Carlo J. Caparas | Eddie Gutierrez, Miguel Rodriguez and Jestoni Alarcon | Drama | Golden Lion Films |
| Shoot That Ball | June 12 | J. Erastheo Navoa | Tito Sotto, Vic Sotto, Joey de Leon and Pops Fernandez | Comedy | |
| Kid, Huwag Kang Susuko | July 2 | Peque Gallaga and Lore Reyes | Richard Gomez | Drama | |
| Asawa Ko Huwag Mong Aagawin | August 14 | Emmanuel Borlaza | Vilma Santos, Gabby Concepcion, Eddie Gutierrez | Drama | |
| Maria Went to Town | August 21 | Luciano B. Carlos | Maricel Soriano, Gary Valenciano, Martin Nievera, Jaime Fabregas and Rosemarie Gil | Comedy | |
| Paano Kung Wala Ka Na? | September 23 | Mel Chionglo | Susan Roces, Eddie Gutierrez, Charo Santos-Concio, Snooky Serna | Drama | |
| Pinulot Ka Lang sa Lupa | October 16 | Ishmael Bernal | Lorna Tolentino, Gabby Concepcion, Maricel Soriano, Eddie Garcia, Carmina Villarroel, Robert Ortega, Elvis Gutierrez, Flora Gasser | Drama | |
| Kumander Gringa | December 3 | Mike Relon Makiling | Roderick Paulate, Richard Gomez and Joey Marquez | Action, comedy | |
| 1 + 1 = 12 + 1 | December 25 | Mike Relon Makiling | Susan Roces, Eddie Gutierrez, Matet de Leon and Sheryl Cruz | Comedy, family | |

=== 1988 ===
| Title | Release date | Director | Cast | Genre(s) | Associated film production |
|---|---|---|---|---|---|
| Fly Me to the Moon | January 4 | Mike Relon Makiling | Tito Sotto, Vic Sotto, Joey de Leon, Richard Gomez and Lotlot de Leon | Comedy, fantasy | |
| Ibulong Mo sa Diyos | February 4 | Elwood Perez | Vilma Santos, Miguel Rodriguez, Nida Blanca | Drama | |
| Love Boat: Mahal Trip Kita | February 11 | Mike Makiling | Susan Roces, Eddie Gutierrez and Ruffa Gutierrez | Comedy, drama, musical | |
| Taray at Teroy | February 25 | Pablo Santiago | Maricel Soriano, Randy Santiago | Romantic comedy | |
| Nakausap Ko ang Birhen | March 24 | Mike Relon Makiling | Lotlot de Leon, Ramon Christopher, Eddie Garcia, Janice de Belen, Snooky Serna | Religious drama | |
| Kambal Tuko | April 14 | J. Erastheo Navoa | Susan Roces, Eddie Gutierrez, Richard Gutierrez, Raymond Gutierrez | Fantasy, comedy | |
| Bobo Cop | May 12 | Tony Y. Reyes | Joey Marquez, Willie Revillame, Carmina Villarroel | Action, sci-fi, comedy | |
| Super Inday and the Golden Bibe | June 23 | Luciano B. Carlos | Maricel Soriano, Aiza Seguerra, Eric Quizon, Manilyn Reynes, Janno Gibbs, Melanie Marquez | Superhero comedy | |
| Nagbabagang Luha | July 7 | Ishmael Bernal | Lorna Tolentino, Gabby Concepcion, Alice Dixson, Richard Gomez | Drama | |
| One Day, Isang Araw | August 18 | Pablo Santiago | Fernando Poe Jr., Matet de Leon, Dawn Zulueta | Action, comedy | |
| Petrang Kabayo at Ang Pilyang Kuting | August 25 | Luciano B. Carlos | Roderick Paulate, Aiza Seguerra, Manilyn Reynes, Janno Gibbs | Comedy, fantasy | |
| Tiyanak | September 15 | Peque Gallaga, Lorenzo A. Reyes | Janice de Belen, Lotlot de Leon, Ramon Christopher, Mary Walter, Chuckie Dreyfus, Carmina Villarroel | Horror | |
| Sandakot Na Bala | October 13 | Jose N. Carreon | Rudy Fernandez | Action | |
| Good Morning Titser | November 2 | Jett C. Espiritu | Vic Sotto, Coney Reyes and Aiza Seguerra | Romantic comedy | |
| Babaing Hampaslupa | November 16 | Mel Chionglo | Maricel Soriano, Gina Alajar, Janice de Belen, Richard Gomez, Edu Manzano, Rowell Santiago, Liza Lorena, Leni Santos, Carmina Villarroel | Romantic drama | |

=== 1989 ===
| Title | Release date | Director | Cast | Genre(s) | Associated film production |
|---|---|---|---|---|---|
| Starzan: Shouting Star of the Jungle | January 4 | Tony Y. Reyes | Joey de Leon, Zsa Zsa Padilla | Comedy | |
| Tadtarin ng Bala si Madelo! | January 26 | Arturo San Agustin | Lito Lapid | Action, drama | |
| Magic to Love | February 2 | J. Erastheo Navoa | Manilyn Reynes, Janno Gibbs, Martin Nievera, Pops Fernandez and Matet de Leon | Romantic comedy, fantasy | |
| Mga Kwento ng Pag-Ibig | February 8 | Junn P. Cabreira, Luciano B. Carlos and Artemio Marquez | Snooky Serna, Lotlot de Leon, Maricel Soriano and Eric Quizon | Romantic comedy | |
| Pahiram ng Isang Umaga | February 23 | Ishmael Bernal | Vilma Santos, Gabby Concepcion and Zsa Zsa Padilla | Drama | |
| Here Comes the Bride | April 1 | Artemio Marquez | Susan Roces, Eddie Gutierrez | Drama, romance | |
| Long Ranger and Tonton: Shooting Stars of the West | April 27 | Tony Y. Reyes | Joey de Leon, Rene Requiestas and Maricel Laxa | Action, comedy, Western | |
| Starzan II | June 7 | Tony Y. Reyes | Joey de Leon, Zsa Zsa Padilla | Comedy | Mother Studio Films |
| Eastwood and Bronson | June 22 | Junn P. Cabreira | Richard Gomez, Joey Marquez and Nanette Medved | Action, comedy | Omega Releasing Organization |
| Kung Maibabalik Ko Lang | July 6 | Artemio Marquez | Maricel Soriano, Pops Fernandez, Eric Quizon and Lotlot de Leon | drama | |
| Sgt. Melgar | July 20 | Arturo San Agustin | Lito Lapid | Action, drama | |
| May Pulis, May Pulis sa Ilalim ng Tulay | August 10 | Mike Relon Makiling | Dolphy, Nova Villa and Joey Albert | Comedy | |
| Bilangin ang Bituin sa Langit | August 17 | Elwood Perez | Nora Aunor, Tirso Cruz III | Drama | |
| Limang Daliri ng Diyos | August 24 | Emmanuel Borlaza | Carmina Villarroel, Helen Vela and Marianne dela Riva | Drama | Golden Lion Films |
| Isang Araw Walang Diyos | August 31 | Peque Gallaga, Lore Reyes | Janice de Belen, Richard Gomez and Alice Dixson | Drama, action | |
| Tamis ng Unang Halik | September 27 | Artemio Marquez | Tina Paner, Cris Villanueva | Romantic comedy, drama | |
| Abandonada | October 4 | Peque Gallaga, Lore Reyes | Alma Moreno, Gabby Concepcion, Janice de Belen and Joey Marquez | Drama | |
| Lady L | October 19 | Anthony Taylor | Gloria Romero, Ronaldo Valdez and Manila Muñoz | Drama | |
| Gawa Na ang Bala para sa Akin | October 25 | Efren Jarlego | Vic Sotto, Rene Requiestas, Panchito Alba, Nova Villa and Ai-Ai delas Alas | Comedy | M-Zet Productions |
| Huwag Kang Hahalik sa Diablo | November 2 | Mauro Gia Samonte | Gloria Romero, Gabby Concepcion, Sunshine Dizon, Ronaldo Valdez, Tina Paner and Jean Garcia | Horror | |
| Student Body | December 12 | Mike Relon Makiling | Joey Marquez, Cris Villanueva, Zoren Legaspi, Jeffrey Santos, Aljon Jimenez, Smokey Manaloto, Maita Soriano, Maritoni Fernandez, Sylvia Sanchez, Carmina Villarroel | Comedy | |
| Regal Shocker: The Movie | December 24 | Jose Javier Reyes | Ruffa Gutierrez, Carmina Villarroel, Isabel Granada | Horror | |
| Last Two Minutes | December 25 | Mike Relon Makiling | Roderick Paulate, Alvin Patrimonio, Paul Alvarez, Jerry Codiñera, Ruffa Gutierrez, Carmina Villarroel, Aiko Melendez, Zoren Legaspi, Jeffrey Santos, Aljon Jimenez | Comedy, fantasy | |

== 1990s ==
=== 1990 ===
| Title | Release date | Director | Cast | Genre(s) | Associated film production |
|---|---|---|---|---|---|
| My Funny Valentine | January 1 | Tony Cruz | Vic Sotto, Kris Aquino | Romantic comedy | |
| Starzan III | January 3 | Tony Y. Reyes | Joey de Leon, Zsa Zsa Padilla, Panchito, Rene Requiestas | Comedy | Starzan Films |
| Flavor of the Month | January 11 | Junn P. Cabreira | Joey Marquez, Lito Pimentel, Alma Moreno, Nadia Montenegro | Comedy | |
| Hanggang Kailan Ka Papatay! | February 6 | Dante Pangilinan | Miguel Rodriguez, Bernard Bonnin, Edu Manzano, Tirso Cruz III | Action | |
| Durugin Ng Bala Si Peter Torres | February 8 | Toto Natividad | Jess Lapid Jr. | Action, drama | |
| Dyesebel | February 20 | Mel Chionglo | Carmina Villarroel, Alice Dixson, Richard Gomez, Malou de Guzman, Judy Ann Santos | Fantasy | |
| Tora Tora, Bang Bang Bang | February 22 | Mike Relon Makiling | Eddie Gutierrez, Isabel Granada, Carmina Villarroel, Nova Villa, Janno Gibbs, Smokey Manaloto | Comedy, war | |
| Small Medium Large | March 13 | Joey de Leon, Tony Y. Reyes | Jimmy Santos, Rene Requiestas | Comedy | Starzan Films |
| Twist... Ako Si Ikaw, Ikaw Si Ako | March 13 | Efren Jarlego | Vic Sotto, Alma Moreno, Aiza Seguerra, Chichay, Panchito, Nova Villa, Jaime Fabregas | Comedy, fantasy | |
| Papa's Girl | March 22 | Luciano B. Carlos | Gary Valenciano, Aiza Seguerra, Isabel Granada, Alice Dixson | Comedy, drama | |
| Ibabaon Kita sa Lupa | March 28 | Toto Natividad | Lito Lapid, Bernard Bonnin | Action, drama | |
| Ganda Babae, Ganda Lalake | March 29 | Tony Cruz | Rene Requiestas, Maricel Laxa, Panchito, Manilyn Reynes | Comedy | |
| Crocodile Jones, Son of Indiana Dundee | April 10 | Efren Jarlego | Vic Sotto, Richie D'Horsie, Maita Soriano | Adventure, comedy | M-Zet Productions |
| Too Young | April 19 | Peque Gallaga, Mike Relon Makiling, Lore Reyes | Aiko Melendez, Nida Blanca, Cherie Gil, Eric Quizon and Aga Muhlach | Action, thriller | |
| Sgt. Clarin: Bala Para Sa Ulo Mo | May 1 | Willie Dado | Max Laurel, Monica Herrera | Action | |
| Kabayo Kids | May 15 | Tony Y. Reyes | Tito Sotto, Vic Sotto, Joey de Leon and Lou Veloso | Action, comedy | |
| Kahit Singko Di Ko Babayaran Ang Buhay Mo! | May 15 | Lito Lapid | Lito Lapid, Alma Moreno | Action | |
| My Other Woman | May 19 | Maryo J. de los Reyes | Christopher De Leon, Alice Dixson, Lani Mercado, Gloria Romero, Eddie Garcia | Drama, romance | |
| Feel Na Feel | May 29 | Rudy Meyer | Susan Roces, Eddie Gutierrez, Manilyn Reynes, Janno Gibbs, Raymond Gutierrez, Richard Gutierrez, Ogie Alcasid | Comedy, family, fantasy | |
| Little & Big Weapon | June 14 | Tony Y. Reyes | Joey de Leon, Rene Requiestas, Tetchie Agbayani | Comedy | |
| Kahit Isumpa Mo Ako | June 26 | Artemio Marquez | Snooky Serna, Gabby Concepcion, Gloria Romero | Drama | |
| Lessons In Love | July 31 | Artemio Marquez | Ruffa Gutierrez, Aljon Jimenez, Isabel Granada | Romance | |
| Lt. Palagawad: Mag-uunahan ang Paa mo sa Hukay! | August 16 | Dante Pangilinan | Chuck Perez, Efren Reyes, Subas Herrero, Monica Herrera | Action | |
| Hahamakin Lahat | September 18 | Lino Brocka | Vilma Santos, Snooky Serna, Gabby Concepcion, Eric Quizon | Drama | |
| I Have 3 Eggs | September 18 | Luciano B. Carlos | Tito Sotto, Vic Sotto, Joey de Leon, Gloria Romero and Aiza Seguerra | Comedy | |
| Hanggang Saan Ang Tapang Mo! | September 21 | Toto Natividad | Richard Gomez, Cristina Gonzales, Patrick Dela Rosa, Jorge Estregan | Action, drama | |
| Pido Dida: Sabay Tayo | October 2 | Tony Cruz | Rene Requiestas, Kris Aquino | Comedy | |
| Island Of Desire | October 4 | Elwood Perez | Ruffa Gutierrez, Zoren Legaspi | Drama | |
| Nimfa | October 10 | Ed Palmos | Cristina Gonzales, Gabby Concepcion | Drama | |
| Kapitan Paile: Hindi Kita Iiwanang Buhay! | October 11 | Dante Pangilinan | Miguel Rodriguez, Dick Israel, Bembol Roco, Rachel Lobangco, Melissa Mendez, Johnny Vicar, Dindo Arroyo, Tony Bagyo | Action | |
| Samson & Goliath | October 17 | Tony Cruz | Vic Sotto, Rene Requiestas and Nova Villa | Comedy | M-Zet Productions |
| Walang Piring Ang Katarungan | November 29 | Lito Lapid | Lito Lapid, Efren Reyes Jr. | Action, drama, war | |
| Hotdog | November 30 | Jose 'Pepe' Wenceslao | Tito Sotto, Vic Sotto, Joey de Leon, Maricel Laxa, Lotlot De Leon, Ramon Christopher, Panchito, Nova Villa, Paquito Diaz | Fantasy, comedy | |
| Juan Tanga... Super Naman At Ang Kambal Na Tiyanak | December 13 | Mike Relon Makiling | Joey Marquez, Ramon Christopher, Billy Crawford, Lotlot De Leon, Richard Gutierrez and Raymond Gutierrez | Comedy, action, fantasy | |
| Lover's Delight | December 18 | Junn P. Cabreira | Joey Marquez, Lito Pimentel, Alma Moreno, Richard Gomez, Alice Dixson, Maricel Laxa, Ruffa Gutierrez, Carmina Villarroel | Comedy | |
| Si Prinsipe Abante at ang Lihim ng Ibong Adarna | December 25 | Tony Cruz | Rene Requiestas, Monica Herrera, Orestes Ojeda, Ruben Rustia, Paquito Diaz | Comedy | Tagalog Pictures Inc. |
| Shake, Rattle & Roll II | December 25 | Peque Gallaga, Lore Reyes | Eric Quizon, Janice de Belen, Isabel Granada, Joey Marquez, Carmina Villarroel, Manilyn Reynes | Horror, thriller, suspense | Good Harvest Unlimited Inc. |

=== 1991 ===
| Title | Release date | Director | Cast | Genre(s) | Associated film production |
|---|---|---|---|---|---|
| Para Sa'Yo Ang Huling Bala Ko | January 18 | Toto Natividad | Richard Gomez, Subas Herrero | Action, drama | |
| Underage Too | February 28 | Maryo J. Delos Reyes | Aiko Melendez, Carmina Villarroel, Ruffa Gutierrez | Romantic comedy | |
| Leon at Tigre | March 16 | Tony Cruz | Maricel Soriano, Rene Requiestas | Comedy | Good Harvest Unlimited Inc. |
| Alyas Batman en Robin | April 6 | Tony Y. Reyes | Rene Requiestas, Dawn Zulueta, Keempee de Leon and Vina Morales | Action, comedy | |
| Luv Ko Si Ma'am | June 20 | Tony Cruz | Rene Requiestas, Alice Dixson, Manilyn Reynes and Janno Gibbs | Romantic comedy | |
| Kung Sino Pa ang Minahal | June 30 | Artemio Marquez | Manilyn Reynes, Janno Gibbs and Aiko Melendez | Drama | |
| Emma Salazar Case | July 17 | Jose Javier Reyes | Alice Dixson, Cristina Gonzales, Aiko Melendez, Ricardo Cepeda, Lorenzo Mara, Gina Alajar | Crime | Good Harvest Unlimited Inc. |
| Makiusap Ka Sa Diyos | July 24 | Lino Brocka | Ruffa Gutierrez, Christopher de Leon and Gabby Concepcion | Drama | |
| Pretty Boy Hoodlum | August 14 | Joey Del Rosario | Zoren Legaspi, Edu Manzano | Action, drama | |
| Ipaglaban mo ako Boy Topak | September 25 | Manuel (Fyke) Cinco | Zoren Legaspi, Sheryl Cruz, Tony Ferrer, Bing Davao, Ricardo Cepeda, Pilar Pilapil, Dick Israel, Ruel Vernal, Robert Miller, Usman Hassim, Boy Roque | Action, drama | Good Harvest Unlimited Inc. |
| Buburahin Kita sa Mundo! | October 23 | Joey Del Rosario | Richard Gomez, Maricel Laxa, Eddie Gutierrez, Paquito Diaz, Sylvia Sanchez, Ruel Vernal, Robert Miller, Usman Hassim, Telly Babasa, Zandro Zamora, Boy Roque | Action, drama | Good Harvest Unlimited Inc. |
| Disgrasyada | October 23 | Mel Chionglo | Ruffa Gutierrez, Zoren Legaspi, Ricardo Cepeda, Maritoni Fernandez | Drama | |
| Daddy Goon | November 27 | Rudy Meyer | Paquito Diaz, Herbert Bautista, Aiza Seguerra, Manilyn Reynes, Eddie Gutierrez | Action, comedy, musical | Good Harvest Unlimited Inc. |
| Okay Ka, Fairy Ko!: The Movie | December 25 | Tony Y. Reyes | Vic Sotto, Charito Solis, Alice Dixson | Comedy, fantasy | M-Zet Productions |
| Shake, Rattle & Roll III | December 25 | Peque Gallaga, Lore Reyes | Kris Aquino, Manilyn Reynes, Janice de Belen, Ogie Alcasid, Rosemarie Gil, Joey Marquez, Gina Alajar, Joel Torre | Horror, thriller | Good Harvest Unlimited Inc. |

=== 1992 ===
| Title | Release date | Director | Cast | Genre(s) | Associated film production |
|---|---|---|---|---|---|
| Ang Tange Kong Pag-Ibig | January 1 | Danilo Cabreira | Vic Sotto, Maricel Soriano and Ruby Rodriguez | Romantic comedy | Mother Studio Films and M-Zet Productions |
| Sam & Miguel (Your Basura, No Problema) | January 1 | Tony Y. Reyes | Vic Sotto, Joey de Leon | Crime, comedy | |
| Lacson, Batas ng Navotas | January 1 | Leonardo Pascual | Lito Lapid, Snooky Serna, Miguel Rodriguez, Charlie Davao, Cristina Gonzales Patrick Dela Rosa, Rachel Lobangco | Action | |
| Ang Siga at ang Sosyal | January 8 | Toto Natividad | Richard Gomez, Kris Aquino | | |
| Iisa Pa Lamang | February 21 | Jose Javier Reyes | Richard Gomez, Dawn Zulueta | Drama, romance | |
| Yakapin Mo Akong Muli | March | Elwood Perez | Snooky Serna, Albert Martinez and Carmina Villarroel | Drama, romance | |
| Bakit Ako Mahihiya?! | April 2 | Romy V. Suzara | Gabby Concepcion, Gretchen Barretto | Drama | |
| The Good, The Bad & the Ugly | April 18 | Luciano B. Carlos | Gabby Concepcion, Rene Requiestas and Paquito Diaz | Comedy | Good Harvest Unlimited Inc. |
| Mahal Kita, Walang Iba | April 21 | Ishmael Bernal | Kris Aquino, Christopher de Leon | Drama, romantic comedy | |
| Aswang | May 21 | Peque Gallaga, Lore Reyes | Berting Labra, Alma Moreno, Manilyn Reynes and Aiza Seguerra | Horror | |
| The Cornelia Ramos Story | June | Artemio Marquez | Snooky Serna, Ricardo Cepeda and Gabby Concepcion | Drama | |
| Angelina: The Movie | July 15 | Romy Suzara | Cristina Gonzales, Eddie Gutierrez | Drama | Good Harvest Unlimited Inc. and GH Pictures |
| Dudurugin Kita ng Bala ko | July 22 | Toto Natividad | Lito Lapid, Maricel Laxa, Bernard Bonnin, Roi Vinzon, Ruel Vernal | Action | |
| Big Boy Bato: Kilabot ng Kankaloo | August 12 | Marlon Bautista | Chuck Perez, Dick Israel, Dennis Roldan, Bernard Bonnin | Action | |
| Sinungaling Mong Puso | August 27 | Maryo J. de los Reyes | Vilma Santos, Gabby Concepcion, Aga Muhlach, Alice Dixson | Romance, drama | |
| Ikaw Ang Lahat Sa Akin | September 10 | Jose Javier Reyes | Maricel Laxa, Richard Gomez and Janice de Belen | Drama | |
| Alyas Boy Kano | October 1 | Pepe Marcos | Edu Manzano, Tirso Cruz III, Maricel Laxa and Johnny Delgado | Action, drama | |
| Shotgun Banjo | October 15 | Joey Del Rosario | Zoren Legaspi, Ruffa Gutierrez and Miguel Rodriguez | Action | |
| Ang Katawan ni Sophia | October 26 | Mauro Gia Samonte | Aga Muhlach, Cristina Gonzales | Drama, horror, romance | |
| Kamay ni Cain | November 25 | Jose N. Carreon | Rudy Fernandez, Alice Dixson | Action | Reflection Films |
| Shake, Rattle & Roll IV | December 25 | Peque Gallaga, Lore Reyes | Manilyn Reynes, Janice de Belen, Gina Alajar, Aiko Melendez, Edu Manzano, Aiza Seguerra, IC Mendoza | Horror, thriller | |
| Adventures of 'Gary Leon at Kuting' | | Peque Gallaga, Lore Reyes | Gabby Concepcion, Manilyn Reynes | Romantic comedy, adventure | |

=== 1993 ===
| Title | Release date | Director | Cast | Genre(s) | Associated film production |
|---|---|---|---|---|---|
| Dugo ng Panday | January 4 | Peque Gallaga, Lore Reyes | Ramon 'Bong' Revilla Jr., Edu Manzano | Action | |
| Gascon... Bala ang Katapat Mo | January 12 | Rogelio Salvador | Lito Lapid, Ruffa Gutierrez, Isabel Granada, Jess Lapid Jr. and Bob Soler | Action | |
| Ayoko Na Sanang Magmahal | January 27 | Manny Valera | Gabby Concepcion, Maricel Laxa, Charito Solis and Maritoni Fernandez | Crime, drama | |
| Hulihin: Probinsyanong Mandurukot | February 3 | Efren Jarlego | Rene Requiestas, Ruffa Gutierrez and Aiza Seguerra | Comedy | |
| Aguinaldo | February 14 | William Mayo | Lito Lapid, Aiko Melendez | Action | |
| Kahit Na May Mahal Ka Ng Iba | February 17 | Jose Francisco | Cristina Gonzales, Albert Martinez and Charito Solis | Drama, romance | |
| Ms. Dolora X | February 23 | Elwood Perez | Sheryl Cruz, Roy Alvarez, Ricky Belmonte and Sunshine Cruz | Crime, drama | |
| Ligaw-ligawan, Kasal-kasalan, Bahay-bahayan | March 17 | Joey Gosiengfiao | Nora Aunor, Maricel Soriano, Manilyn Reynes and Richard Gomez | Comedy | |
| Pido Dida 3: May Kambal Na | April 11 | Tony Cruz | Rene Requiestas, Kris Aquino and Al Tantay | Comedy | |
| Ulong Pugot: Nagpapagot | April | Artemio Marquez | Aljon Jimenez, Manilyn Reynes, Tirso Cruz III and Nova Villa | Comedy | |
| Adan Ronquillo: Tubong Cavite... Laking Tondo | May 8 | Joey Del Rosario | Bong Revilla, Ronaldo Valdez, Sheryl Cruz and Miguel Rodriguez | Action | Star Cinema |
| Galvez: Hanggang sa Dulo ng Mundo, Hahanapin Kita | May 27 | Manuel Cinco | Eddie Garcia, Edu Manzano and Pilar Pilapil | Action, crime | |
| Mga S'yanong Parak | May 29 | Jett Espiritu | Roderick Paulate, Benjie Paras, Herbert Bautista and Ogie Alcasid | Comedy | |
| Hindi Kita Malilimutan | May 30 | Jose Javier Reyes | Aga Muhlach, Carmina Villarroel, Maricel Laxa and Jomari Yllana | Drama, romance | |
| Abel Morado: Ikaw ang Maysala | June 17 | Maryo J. de los Reyes | Aga Muhlach, Ruffa Gutierrez and Ana Roces | Action, drama | |
| The Vizconde Massacre: God Help Us! | June 24 | Carlo J. Caparas | Romeo Vasquez, Kris Aquino and Lady Lee | Crime, drama | Golden Lion Films |
| Dino... Abangan ang Susunod Na... | July 29 | Joey Marquez | Anjo Yllana, Aiko Melendez and William Martinez | Comedy | Good Harvest Unlimited Inc. |
| Bulag, Pipi at Bingi | July 29 | Joey Marquez | Manilyn Reynes, Anjo Yllana, Vandolph and Benjie Paras | Comedy, fantasy | |
| Guwapings Dos | July 29 | Manny Castañeda, Jose Javier Reyes | Mark Anthony Fernandez, Eric Fructuoso, Jomari Yllana, Alma Moreno and Aga Muhlach | Comedy horror, drama | |
| Kung Ako'y Iiwan Mo | August 5 | Marilou Diaz-Abaya | Lorna Tolentino, Gabby Concepcion, Sarah Jane Abad | Drama | |
| Makati Ave. Office Girls | September 2 | Jose Javier Reyes | Alma Moreno, Maricel Laxa, Carmina Villarroel, Cherry Pie Picache, Karla Estrada and Dingdong Dantes | Drama | |
| Maricris Sioson: Japayuki | September 25 | Joey Romero | Ruffa Gutierrez, Janice de Belen and Joel Torre | Crime, drama | |
| The Myrna Diones Story (Lord, Have Mercy!) | September 29 | Carlo J. Caparas | Kris Aquino, Gina Alajar, Boots Anson-Roa and Eddie Rodriguez | Crime, drama | Golden Lions Films |
| Kailan Dalawa ng Mahal | October 12 | Gil Portes | Snooky Serna, Gabby Concepcion and Ruffa Gutierrez | Drama | |
| Teenage Mama | October 21 | Maryo J. de los Reyes | Sunshine Cruz, Karla Estrada and Gina Alajar | Drama | |
| Humanda Ka Mayor!: Bahala na ang Diyos | November 15 | Carlo J. Caparas | Aga Muhlach, Kris Aquino and Nida Blanca | Crime, drama, action | Golden Lion Films |
| Mancao | December 2 | Felix E. Dalay | Phillip Salvador, Gabby Concepcion, Zandro Zamora, Snooky Serna, Ramon Christopher | Action | Moviestars Productions |
| Rio: You Know What How To Pray | December 6 | Eduardo Gunderson | Blu Gunderson, Rafael Gunderson, Nigel Clement and Mauro Clement | Action, adventure | Rio Films |

=== 1994 ===
| Title | Release date | Director | Cast | Genre(s) | Associated film production |
|---|---|---|---|---|---|
| Bakit Ngayon Ka Lang? | January 18 | Laurice Guillen | Christopher de Leon, Alice Dixson | Drama, romance | OctoArts Films |
| Hataw Tatay Hataw | February 3 | Efren Jarlego | Dolphy, Sheryl Cruz and Zoren Legaspi | Comedy | |
| Buhay ng Buhay Ko | April 21 | Jose Javier Reyes | Aiko Melendez, Dawn Zulueta | Drama | |
| Alyas Boy Ama: Tirador | April 29 | Baldo Marro | Zoren Legaspi | Action | Moviestars Productions |
| Bakit Pa Kita Minahal | June 1 | Chito S. Roño | Kris Aquino, Aga Muhlach, Richard Gomez and Ruffa Gutierrez | Drama | |
| The Fatima Buen Story | July 27 | Mario O'Hara | Kris Aquino, Zoren Legaspi, Janice de Belen | Crime | |
| Nag-Iisang Bituin | August 31 | Jose Javier Reyes | Vilma Santos, Christopher de Leon and Aga Muhlach | Drama | |
| The Secrets of Sarah Jane: Sana'y Mapatawad Mo | October 5 | Maryo J. de los Reyes | Gelli de Belen, Richard Gomez, Karla Estrada and Jomari Yllana | Biography, drama | MAQ Productions |
| Ging Gang Gooly Giddiyap: I Love You Daddy | October 20 | Manny Castañeda | Romnick Sarmenta, Manilyn Reynes, Jimmy Santos, Joey Marquez and Trish Roque | Comedy, fantasy | |
| Vampira | October 26 | Joey Romero | Maricel Soriano, Christopher de Leon and Nida Blanca | Horror, drama | |
| Ika-11 Utos: Mahalin Mo, Asawa Mo | November 16 | Marilou Diaz-Abaya | Aiko Melendez, Zsa Zsa Padilla, Maricel Laxa, Gabby Concepcion | Romance, drama | Star Cinema |
| Paano Na? Sa Mundo ni Janet | December 14 | Jose N. Carreon | Christopher De Leon, Alma Moreno, Sheryl Cruz, Zoren Legaspi, Aiza Seguerra | Drama | Good Harvest Unlimited Inc. & GH Pictures |
| Shake, Rattle & Roll V | December 25 | Manny Castañeda, Don Escudero, Jose Javier Reyes | Sheryl Cruz, Manilyn Reynes, Ruffa Gutierrez, Chuck Perez, Monsour del Rosario, Tom Taus, Jr., Jaclyn Jose | Horror, suspense, thriller | |
| Greggy en Boogie: Sakyan Mo Na Lang, Anna | | Efren Jarlego | Benjie Paras, Sheryl Cruz | Comedy | |
| Hindi Magbabago | | Don Escudero | Carmina Villarroel, BB Gandanghari, Maricel Laxa and John Estrada | Romance | Mahogany Pictures |

=== 1995 ===
| Title | Release date | Director | Cast | Genre(s) | Associated film production |
|---|---|---|---|---|---|
| Pustahan Tayo, Mahal Mo Ako | January 4 | Danilo P. Cabreira | Bong Revilla, Maricel Soriano and Miguel Rodriguez | Action, romance, comedy | RRJ Productions |
| Kahit Harangan ng Bala | February 8 | Joey Del Rosario | Romnick Sarmenta, Sunshine Cruz and Tirso Cruz III | Action | |
| Araw-Araw, Gabi-Gabi | February 14 | Jose Javier Reyes | Janice de Belen, John Estrada, Aiko Melendez and Jomari Yllana | Drama, romance | MAQ Productions |
| Victim No. 1: Delia Maga (Jesus, Pray for Us!) | March 18 | Carlo J. Caparas | Gina Alajar, Joel Torre and Elizabeth Oropesa | Biography, crime, drama | Golden Lion Films |
| Batas Ko Ang Katapat Mo | May 21 | Pepe Marcos | Bong Revilla, Edu Manzano, Subas Herrero and Jimmy Santos | Action | RRJ Productions |
| Rollerboys | May 31 | Jose Javier Reyes | Tirso Cruz III, Gloria Romero, Eric Fructuoso, Ogie Diaz and G. Toengi | Comedy | |
| Batang-X | June 30 | Peque Gallaga | Aiko Melendez, Michael De Mesa, Janus del Prado and John Prats | Action, sci-fi | |
| Sa 'Yo Lamang | July 27 | Maryo J. de los Reyes | Richard Gomez and Aiko Melendez | Drama | |
| Ikaw Pa Eh... Love Kita | August 2 | Danilo P. Cabreira | Lito Lapid, Maricel Soriano, Nida Blanca and Gloria Romero | Action, romantic comedy | RRJ Productions |
| Wilson Sorronda: Leader Kuratong Baleleng's Solid Group | August 16 | Carlo J. Caparas | Jinggoy Estrada, Bong Revilla and Sunshine Cruz | Action | Golden Lions Films |
| Ibigay Mo Ng Todong-Todo | August 23 | Baldo Marro | Wowie de Guzman | Action | Universal Records |
| Pulis Probinsya II | August 28 | Augusto Salvador | Phillip Salvador, Sheryl Cruz, Eddie Gutierrez and Willie Revillame | Action | Good Harvest Unlimited Inc. |
| Boy! Gising! | October 13 | Bey Vito | Vandolph, Manilyn Reynes, Aljon Jimenez and Candy Pangilinan | Comedy | |
| Baby Love | | Peque Gallaga and Lore Reyes | Edu Manzano, Cherry Pie Picache, Anna Larrucea and Jason Salcedo | Drama, romance | |
| Best Friends | | Tony Y. Reyes | Noel Ayala, John Estrada, Rochelle Barrameda and Alma Concepcion | Comedy, drama | MAQ Productions |
| Escobar: Walang Sasantuhin | | Efren C. Piñon | Lito Lapid, Chin Chin Gutierrez, Monsour del Rosario | Action, drama | |
| Sa Ngalan ng Pag-Ibig | | Maryo J. de los Reyes | Christopher de Leon, Lorna Tolentino, Lito Pimentel and Alma Concepcion | Drama, romance, thriller | Available Light Productions |
| The Marita Gonzaga Rape-Slay: In God We Trust! | | Carlo J. Caparas | Sunshine Cruz, Jinggoy Estrada and Maggie dela Riva | Crime, drama | Golden Lion Films |
| Ikaw lang ang mamahalin: Camiguin | | Maryo J. delos Reyes | Gelli de Belen, Jomari Yllana, Tiya Pusit and Sylvia Sanchez | Drama, romance | MAQ Productions |

=== 1996 ===
| Title | Release date | Director | Cast | Genre(s) | Associated film production |
|---|---|---|---|---|---|
| Impakto | January 18 | Don Escudero | Gelli de Belen, Antonio Aquitania, Cherry Pie Picache, Candy Pangilinan and Daria Ramirez | Horror | |
| Duwelo | March 10 | Phillip Ko | Eddie Garcia, Zoren Legaspi | Action | |
| Daddy's Angel | April 6 | Joey Romero | Jayvee Gayoso, Trish Roque and Joanne Quintas | Drama, family | Mother Studio Films |
| Nights of Serafina | May 8 | Joey Gosiengfiao | Giorgia Ortega, Mike Magat, John Apacible, Angelika Dela Cruz and Jo-An Jackson | Drama, romance | Mother Studio Films |
| Bayarang Puso | June 20 | Jose Javier Reyes | Lorna Tolentino, Aga Muhlach and Carmina Villarroel | Drama, romance | |
| Kung Alam Mo Lang | July 3 | Boots Plata | Judy Ann Santos, Wowie de Guzman, Gladys Reyes and Jaclyn Jose | Drama, romance | MAQ Productions and Kaizz Ventures |
| Magtago Ka O Lumaban | September 23 | Bebong Osorio | Ricky Davao, Cherry Pie Picache, Bembol Roco, Beth Tamayo | Action | Mother Studio Films; Good Harvest Unlimited Inc. GH Pictures Ltd. |
| Kung Marunong Kang Magdasal, Umpisahan Mo Na | November 12 | Pepe Marcos | Bong Revilla, Aiko Melendez, Edu Manzano and Zoren Legaspi | Action | |
| Melencio Magat: Dugo Laban sa Dugo | November 15 | Toto Natividad | Eddie Garcia, Zoren Legaspi, Jeric Raval | Action | |
| Istokwa | | Chito S. Roño | Vhong Navarro, Mark Anthony Fernandez and G. Toengi | Drama | MAQ Productions |
| Suicide Rangers | | Lito Lapid | Jeric Raval, Alma Concepcion, Jimmy Santos | Action, Crime | Mahogany Pictures |
| Medrano | | Joey Del Rosario | Gardo Versoza, Sunshine Cruz, Efren Reyes Jr. | Action | Mother Studio Films |
| Taguan | | Don Escudero | Gelli de Belen, Janice de Belen, Jomari Yllana, Wendell Ramos | Drama, romance | MAQ Productions |

=== 1997 ===
| Title | Release date | Director | Cast | Genre(s) | Associated film production |
|---|---|---|---|---|---|
| Manananggal in Manila | January 1 | Mario O'Hara | Tonton Gutierrez, Alma Concepcion, Aiza Seguerra | Horror | MAQ Productions |
| Wow, Multo! | January 11 | Tony Reyes | Joey de Leon, Alma Concepcion, Judy Ann Santos, Wowie de Guzman | Horror, comedy | MAQ Productions |
| Shake, Rattle & Roll VI | January 22 | Maurice Carvajal, Anton Juan, and Frank G. Rivera | Tonton Gutierrez, Camille Prats, Aiza Seguerra, Georgia Ortega, Ara Mina, Matet de Leon, Tom Taus Jr. | Horror, thriller | MAQ Productions |
| Bala Para sa Katarungan | January 25 | Sonny Parsons | Sonny Parsons, Bernard Bonnin, Joanne Quintas | Action | J-Pan Films |
| Ibulong Mo sa Diyos 2 | March 19 | F.C. Gargantilla | Assunta de Rossi, Manilyn Reynes, Tirso Cruz III, Boots Anson-Roa and Carlos Agassi | drama | |
| Cobra | April 9 | Arturo SanAgustin | Danilo Fernandez, Ara Mina and Lito Legaspi | Action | |
| Anak ng Dilim | May 7 | Nick Lizaso | Gladys Reyes, Amy Austria and Gina Pareño | Drama, horror | |
| Ako Ba ang Nasa Puso Mo? | May 14 | Jose Javier Reyes | Judy Ann Santos and Mark Anthony Fernandez | Drama, romance | Available Light Productions |
| Super Ranger Kids | June 12 | Rogelio Salvador | Rodney Shattara, Ara Mina and Thou Reyes | Action, adventure, comedy | |
| Ligaw na Bala: Lt. Alexander Lademor | July 12 | Francis Posadas | Raymond Keannu, Alma Concepcion and Dennis Roldan | Action | MAQ Productions |
| Diliryo | August | Peque Gallaga and Lore Reyes | Jomari Yllana, G. Toengi, Pinky de Leon and Amada Cortez | Drama | MAQ Productions |
| Yes Darling: Walang Matigas Na Pulis 2 | September 20 | Pepe Marcos | Bong Revilla, Rosanna Roces, Lani Mercado and Jimmy Santos | Action, comedy | |
| Bandido | October 10 | Efren C. Pinon | Zoren Legaspi, Anjanette Abayari and Rando Almanzor | Action, drama | |
| Kulayan Natin ang Bukas | October 22 | Boots Plata | Judy Ann Santos, Mylene Dizon, Andrea Blaesi and Eric Fructuoso | Drama | |
| Halik | December 3 | Don Escudero | Christopher De Leon, Ruffa Gutierrez, Alma Concepcion | Drama, thriller, horror | MAQ Productions & Available Light Productions |
| Bawal Mahalin, Bawal Ibigin | | Jay Jay Cabrera | Rita Magdalena, Emilio Garcia and Stella Ruiz | Drama, romance, erotic | MAQ Productions & Good Harvest Unlimited Inc. |
| Go Johnny Go | | Ipe Pelino | Johnny Abarrientos, Willie Revillame and Dencio Padilla | Comedy | |
| Kasangga Mo Ako Hanggang sa Huling Laban | | Phillip Ko; Teddy Gomez | Lito Lapid, Chuck Perez and Eddie Gutierrez | Action | MAQ Productions Inc. |
| Kirot sa Puso | | F.C. Gargantilla | Ana Capri, Ramona Revilla, Roy Rodrigo and Gloria Diaz | Drama, erotic | MAQ Productions Inc. |
| Minsan Lamang Nagmamahal | | Jose Javier Reyes | Maricel Soriano, Edu Manzano, Maricel Laxa and Nida Blanca | Drama, romance | MAQ Productions Inc. |
| Pakners | | Efren C. Pinon | Camille Prats, Tom Taus and Boy2 Quizon | Comedy | MAQ Productions Inc. |

=== 1998 ===
| Title | Release date | Director | Cast | Genre(s) | Associated film production |
|---|---|---|---|---|---|
| Casa Verde | January 8 | Joey Romero | Tonton Gutierrez, Ynez Veneracion | Drama, romance | Good Harvest Unlimited Inc. |
| Ikaw Pa Rin ang Iibigin | February 11 | Maryo J. de los Reyes | Aga Muhlach, Aiko Melendez, Charito Solis and Gina Pareño | Drama, romance | |
| Kahit Pader Gigibain Ko | March 4 | Joey Del Rosario | Phillip Salvador, Rosanna Roces and Eddie Gutierrez | Action | RS Productions |
| Buhawi Jack | April 29 | Teddy Gomez | Monsour del Rosario and Carmina Villarroel | Action, fantasy | |
| Kahit Mabuhay Kang Muli | May 1 | Efren C. Piñon | Zoren Legaspi, Carmina Villarroel and Danilo Fernandez | Action, drama | |
| Curacha: Ang Babaeng Walang Pahinga | May 27 | Chito S. Roño | Rosanna Roces, Jaclyn Jose and Ara Mina | Drama | |
| Tatlong Kasalanan | June 10 | Johnny Cruz, Elwood Perez | Rita Magdalena, Miya Nolasco | Drama | Good Harvest Unlimited Inc. |
| Akala Ko Ikaw ay Akin | July 22 | | Alma Concepcion | Drama | Good Harvest Unlimited Inc. & GH Pictures |
| Sige Subukan Mo | August 5 | Francis Posadas | Ace Vergel and Maricel Soriano | Action, romance | |
| Walang Katumbas ang Dugo | August 19 | Toto Natividad | Richard Gomez, Gelli de Belen and Mark Anthony Fernandez | Drama | |
| Init ng Laman | September 23 | Tata Esteban | Sunshine Cruz, John Apacible, Melissa Mendez, Toffee Calma, Hazel Espinosa | Action, romance | Good Harvest Unlimited Inc. |
| Pares-Pares: Trip ng Puso | September 30 | Manny Castañeda | Caloy Alde, Susan Lozada | Romantic comedy | Good Harvest Unlimited Inc. & GH Pictures |
| Serafin Geronimo: Ang kriminal ng Baryo Concepcion | October 21 | Lav Diaz | Raymond Bagatsing, Tonton Gutierrez, Angel Aquino, Ana Capri | Action, crime, drama | Good Harvest Unlimited Inc. |
| Hangga't Kaya Kong Lumaban | October 28 | Junn P. Cabreira | Gardo Versoza, Emilio Garcia, Via Veloso, Christopher Roxas, Assunta De Rossi | Action | Good Harvest Unlimited Inc. |
| Ang Joker at ang Pistolero | November 18 | Jimmy Ko | Chuck Perez and Ace Vergel | Action, Western | Good Harvest Unlimited Inc. & GH Pictures |
| Sana Pag-Ibig Na | December 2 | Jeffrey Jeturian | Nida Blanca, Angel Aquino, Gerald Madrid, Chinggoy Alonzo | Drama | Good Harvest Unlimited Inc., GH Pictures & Available Light Productions |

=== 1999 ===
| Title | Release date | Director | Cast | Genre(s) | Associated film production |
|---|---|---|---|---|---|
| Sisa | January 27 | Mario O'Hara | Gardo Versoza and Aya Medel | Drama | Good Harvest Unlimited Inc. & GH Pictures Ltd. |
| Hinahanap-Hanap Kita | February 9 | Chito S. Roño | Aga Muhlach, G. Toengi and Shaina Magdayao | Drama, romance | |
| Alyas Big Time | February 18 | Pong Mercado | Zoren Legaspi and Ana Capri | Action | |
| SPO4 Braulio Tapang | March 17 | Leonardo L. Garcia | Danilo Fernandez, Kier Legaspi, and Bernard Bonnin | Action, crime | Good Harvest Unlimited Inc. & GH Pictures |
| Junior Quiapo | March 24 | Dante Pangilinan | Chuck Perez, Allysa Alvarez | Action | Good Harvest Unlimited Inc. |
| Nikilado | April 21 | Leonardo Garcia | Jeric Raval | Action | |
| Kamay ni Eva | May 12 | Ces Evangelista | Carlos Morales and Alma Concepcion | Drama | Good Harvest Unlimited Inc. |
| Banatan | May 19 | Uro dela Cruz | Jomari Yllana, Ara Mina and Karla Estrada | Action | |
| Pila-Balde | June 2 | Jeffrey Jeturian | Ana Capri | Drama, erotic | Good Harvest Unlimited Inc. & Available Light Productions |
| Seventeen... So Kaka | June 16 | Johnny Cruz | Jaclyn Jose, Joel Torre, Angelika dela Cruz and Julio Diaz | Drama, romance | Good Harvest Unlimited Inc. & GH Pictures |
| Luksong Tinik | June 23 | Jose Javier Reyes | Lorna Tolentino, Monsour Del Rosario and G. Toengi | Drama | Available Light Productions |
| Phone Sex | July 14 | Jose Javier Reyes | Ara Mina, Samantha Lopez, Marita Zobel, Lui Manansala, Manny Castañeda | Drama, erotic | Available Light Productions |
| Markado | July 21 | Efren C. Piñon | Zoren Legaspi and Edu Manzano | Action | |
| Hubad Sa Ilalim ng Buwan | August 25 | Lav Diaz | Klaudia Koronel, Joel Torre and Isabel Granada | Drama, romance | Good Harvest Unlimited Inc. |
| Sa Paraiso ni Efren | September 6 | Maryo J. de los Reyes | Anton Bernardo, Ana Capri and Ynez Veneracion | Drama, erotic | Good Harvest Unlimited Inc. |
| Kapag Kumulo ang Dugo | September 29 | Leonardo L. Garcia | Jeric Raval and Daisy Reyes | Action | |
| Lalaban Ako Hanggang sa Huling Hininga | October 13 | Teddy Gomez | Monsour del Rosario, Carmina Villarroel | Action | Good Harvest Unlimited Inc. |
| Bayolente | October 20 | Baldo Marro | Zoren Legaspi, Melissa Mendez and Ruel Vernal | Action | Virtual Cinema International |
| Dugo ng Birhen: El Kapitan | October 27 | Rico Maria Ilarde | Klaudia Koronel, Monsour del Rosario and Mark Gil | Action, fantasy | Good Harvest Unlimited Inc. |
| Higit Pa sa Buhay Ko | November 17 | Maryo J. de los Reyes | Christopher de Leon, Maricel Laxa, Aiko Melendez and Candy Pangilinan | Drama | MAQ Productions |
| Ganito Ako Magmahal | December 1 | Manny Castaneda | Alice Dixson, G. Toengi and Rustom Padilla | Drama, romance | Good Harvest Unlimited Inc. |
| Sa Piling Ng Aswang | December 25 | Peque Gallaga and Lore Reyes | Maricel Soriano, Manilyn Reynes, Gardo Versoza and Gina Alajar | Horror, suspense, thriller | MAQ Productions |

== 2000s ==
=== 2000 ===
| Title | Release date | Director | Cast | Genre(s) | Associated film production |
|---|---|---|---|---|---|
| Shame: Bakit Ako Mahihiya? | January 17 | Manny Castañeda | Ina Raymundo, John Apacible and Angela Velez | Drama | Available Light Productions |
| Fidel Jimenez: Magkasubukan Tayo | February 2 | Tata Esteban | Lito Lapid, Ana Capri, Tonton Gutierrez | Action | |
| Mahal Kita, Walang Iwanan | February 9 | Maryo J. de los Reyes | Aiko Melendez, Gelli de Belen and Jomari Yllana | Drama, romance | |
| Nag-Aapoy na Laman | February 14 | Don Escudero | Zoren Legaspi, Ara Mina and Pinky Amador | Drama | Available Light Productions |
| Tugatog | March 1 | Don Escudero | Vhong Navarro, Jao Mapa, Spencer Reyes and Christopher Roxas | Adventure, thriller | Available Light Productions |
| Most Wanted: Bira | March 8 | | Jomari Yllana | Action | |
| Pedrong Palad | March 15 | Nick Deocampo | Joonee Gamboa, Chin Chin Gutierrez and Jaclyn Jose | Adventure, drama, fantasy | Good Harvest Unlimited Inc. & GH Pictures |
| Makamandag Na Bala | March 22 | Baldo Marro | Baldo Marro, Jestoni Alarcon | Action | |
| Babaeng Putik | March 28 | Rico Maria Ilarde | Carlos Morales and Klaudia Koronel | Action, thriller, horror | |
| Sagot Ko Ang Buhay Ko | April 5 | William Mayo | Jeric Raval, Klaudia Koronel, Raymond Keannu, Mike Gayoso and Brando Legaspi | Action | |
| Baliktaran | May 3 | Baldo Marro | Zoren Legaspi, Tonton Gutierrez | Action | |
| Tunay na Mahal | June 28 | Jose Javier Reyes | Christopher de Leon, Maricel Soriano | Drama, romance | Available Light Productions |
| Pasasabugin Ko ang Mundo Mo | July 19 | Baldo Marro | Lito Lapid | Action | |
| Garapal | August 2 | Pong Mercado | Gary Estrada | Action | |
| Pangarap ng Puso | August 9 | Mario O'Hara | Hilda Koronel, Anita Linda and Matet de Leon | Drama, romance, horror | |
| Angel de la Guardia | August 23 | William Mayo | Vhong Navarro, Isabel Granada, Brandon Legaspi and Jeric Raval | Action | |
| Testigo | September 13 | Francis Posadas | Zoren Legaspi, Daisy Reyes | Action | |
| Yakapin Mo ang Umaga | September 27 | Jose Javier Reyes | Lorna Tolentino, Christopher de Leon, Cogie Domingo, Gina Alajar and Mon Confiado | Drama | Available Light Productions |
| Katayan | October 11 | Uro dela Cruz | Jomari Yllana | Action | |
| Huwag Mong Ubusin Ang Bait Ko! | November 8 | Baldo Marro | Lito Lapid and Gardo Versoza | Action | PAL Entertainments |
| Eskort | November 15 | Harry James | Isabel Granada, Lito Lapid | Action | Manoli Films |
| Laro sa Baga | November 27 | Chito S. Roño | Carlos Morales, Ara Mina, Angel Aquino and Monique Wilson | Drama | |
| Sugatang Puso | December 25 | Jose Javier Reyes | Christopher de Leon, Cherie Gil, Patrick Garcia, Carlo Aquino and Lorna Tolentino | Romance, drama | |
| Spirit Warriors | December 25 | Chito S. Roño | Joel Torre, Jhong Hilario, Danilo Barrios, Spencer Reyes, and Vhong Navarro | Horror, suspense, thriller, comedy | MAQ Productions |
| Patigas | | | Lito Lapid, Ana Capri | Action | |

=== 2001 ===
| Title | Release date | Director | Cast | Genre(s) | Associated film production |
|---|---|---|---|---|---|
| Bala Ko... Bahala Sa 'Yo | February 14 | Pong Mercado | Jeric Raval, Kier Legaspi and Via Veloso | Action | |
| Tuhog | February 21 | Jeffrey Jeturian | Ina Raymundo, Klaudia Koronel, Dante Rivero, Jaclyn Jose, Irma Adlawan | Drama | Available Light Productions |
| Live Show | March 7 | Jose Javier Reyes | Paolo Rivero, Klaudia Koronel and Ana Capri | Drama | Available Light Productions |
| Sgt. Maderazo: Bayad Na Pati Kaluluwa Mo | April 18 | | Ian Veneracion, LJ Moreno | Action | |
| Halik ng Sirena | May 1 | Joven Tan | Isabel Granada, Carlos Morales and Pinky Amador | Romance, fantasy | |
| Minsan May Isang Puso | May 9 | Jose Javier Reyes | Jaclyn Jose, Ricky Davao, Ana Capri, Dimples Romana and Carlo Aquino | Drama | Available Light Productions |
| Oras Na Para Lumaban | May 16 | Joven Tan | Gary Estrada, Roy Alvarez, Ricardo Cepeda and Allen Dizon | Action | |
| Masikip Na ang Mundo Mo, Labrador | June 6 | Baldo Marro | Lito Lapid, Isabel Granada and Ricardo Cepeda | Action | |
| Onsehan | July 11 | Eugene Asis | Maricar de Mesa, Carlos Morales | Action | 921 Filmworx |
| Bagansya | July 25 | Pong Mercado | Jeric Raval, Sharla Tolentino | Action | |
| Red Diaries | July 31 | Maryo J. de los Reyes | Assunta De Rossi | Romance, drama | |
| Cool Dudes 24/7 | August 15 | Ruel S. Bayani | Cogie Domingo, Danilo Barrios, James Blanco, Phoemela Baranda and Glaiza de Castro | Comedy | |
| Bukas, Babaha ng Dugo | September 19 | Baldo Marro | Lito Lapid, Emilio Garcia, Via Veloso and Efren Reyes, Jr. | Action | |
| Huli Sa Akto | October 10 | Francis Posadas | Jestoni Alarcon, Roy Alvarez and Allona Amor | Action, thriller | |
| Ano Bang Meron Ka? | November 14 | Maryo J. de los Reyes | Joyce Jimenez, Diether Ocampo, Nida Blanca and John Lapus | Drama, romantic comedy | |
| Eksperto: Ako ang Sasagupa! | November 21 | William Mayo | Jeric Raval, Sharla Tolentino and Ruel Vernal | Action | |
| Amasona.... Kumakasa, Pumuputok | December 5 | Mauro Gia Samonte | John Regala, Sharla Tolentino, Patrick Dela Rosa and Mon Confiado | Action | Good Harvest Unlimited Inc. |
| Bahay Ni Lola | December 25 | Uro Dela Cruz | Gloria Romero, Manilyn Reynes, Gina Alajar, Isabella de Leon, Maxene Magalona, Allan K and Aiza Seguerra | Horror, suspense, thriller | |
| Hubog | December 25 | Joel Lamangan | Assunta De Rossi, Alessandra De Rossi, Wendell Ramos and Jay Manalo | Drama | Good Harvest Unlimited Inc. |
| Yamashita: The Tiger's Treasure | December 25 | Chito S. Roño | Armando Goyena, Danilo Barrios, Albert Martinez, Vic Diaz, Rustom Padilla and Camille Prats | Action, drama, war | MAQ Productions |

=== 2002 ===
| Title | Release date | Director | Cast | Genre(s) | Associated film production |
|---|---|---|---|---|---|
| Hesus, Rebolusyonaryo | February 6 | Lav Diaz | Mark Anthony Fernandez, Donita Rose | Action, drama, sci-fi | |
| Parola: Bilangguang Walang Rehas | April 17 | Baldo Marro | Ace Espinosa, Emilio Garcia and Ramon Baldomarro | Action, romance | |
| Pistolero | April 24 | William Mayo | Jeric Raval, John Apacible and Ramon Zamora | Action, comedy horror | |
| Sabayan sa Laban | May 8 | Eugene Asis | Carlos Morales and Via Veloso | Action | 921 Filmworx |
| I Think I'm in Love | June 12 | Maryo J. de los Reyes | Piolo Pascual, Joyce Jimenez | Romantic comedy, drama | |
| Pakisabi Na Lang, Mahal Ko S'ya | July 31 | Boots Plata | Judy Ann Santos, Cogie Domingo and KC Montero | Romantic comedy, drama | |
| Laman | September 11 | Maryo J. de los Reyes | Albert Martinez, Elizabeth Oropesa, Yul Servo | Thriller, erotic, drama | |
| Prosti | October 2 | Erik Matti | Aubrey Miles and Jay Manalo | Erotic, drama | |
| Masikip Mainit... Paraisong Parisukat | October 16 | Jose Javier Reyes | Joyce Jimenez, Jay Manalo and Cherry Pie Picache | Drama | |
| Singsing ni Lola | October 30 | Uro dela Cruz | Gina Alajar, Joel Torre, Aiza Seguerra and Maxene Magalona | Horror, fantasy | |
| Two Timer | November 6 | Mel Chionglo | Ara Mina | Action, drama | |
| Sex Files | November 13 | Joven Tan | Pinky Amador, Halina Perez, Ana Capri | Erotic, drama | Good Harvest Unlimited, Inc. & GH Pictures |
| Bahid | November 27 | Joel Lamangan | Eddie Garcia, Dina Bonnevie, Diether Ocampo and Assunta De Rossi | Drama | EG Productions |
| Bakit Papa? | December 4 | Uro dela Cruz | Allan K., Sexbomb Girls | Comedy | APT Entertainment |
| Mano Po | December 25 | Joel Lamangan | Maricel Soriano, Richard Gomez, Ara Mina, Kris Aquino, Boots Anson-Roa, Eric Quizon, Amy Austria and Eddie Garcia | Family, drama, romance | |

=== 2003 ===
| Title | Release date | Director | Cast | Genre(s) | Associated film production |
|---|---|---|---|---|---|
| Spirit Warriors: The Shortcut | January 1 | Chito S. Roño | Vhong Navarro, Jhong Hilario, Spencer Reyes, Danilo Barrios, Chris Cruz, Jaime Fabregas and Gloria Romero | Fantasy, horror, adventure | MAQ Productions |
| Nympha | March 5 | Celso Ad. Castillo | Maricar de Mesa, Antonio Aquitania, Gloria Diaz and Joseph Izon | Drama | |
| Xerex | April 30 | Mel Chionglo | Aubrey Miles, Jon Hall and Kalani Ferreria | Drama, thriller | |
| Anghel Sa Lupa | May 21 | Jose Javier Reyes | Cogie Domingo, Luciano B. Carlos, Dina Bonnevie, Maxene Magalona and Jiro Manio | Drama | |
| Sanib | June 11 | Celso Ad. Castillo | Aubrey Miles, Joel Torre and Gina Alajar | Horror | MAQ Productions |
| Sa Piling ng Mga Belyas | July 30 | Jose N. Carreon | Mark Anthony Fernandez, Gary Estrada | Drama | Violett Films |
| Sex Scandal | November 19 | Francis Posadas | Danna Garcel, Isabella Gomez | Erotic, drama | |
| Mano Po 2 | December 25 | Erik Matti | Susan Roces, Zsa Zsa Padilla, Kris Aquino, Judy Ann Santos, Jay Manalo, Carmina Villarroel, Richard Gutierrez, Cogie Domingo, Christopher de Leon, Chynna Ortaleza and Lorna Tolentino | Drama | |

=== 2004 ===
| Title | Release date | Director | Cast | Genre(s) | Associated film production |
|---|---|---|---|---|---|
| Gagamboy | January 1 | Erik Matti | Vhong Navarro, Jay Manalo, Aubrey Miles, Long Mejia, Bearwin Meily and Rene "Ate Glow" Facunla | Superhero, comedy | MAQ Productions |
| Kuya | February 18 | Dominic Zapata | Danilo Barrios, Aubrey Miles, Richard Gutierrez, Maxene Magalona, Cogie Domingo, James Blanco, Chynna Ortaleza, Oyo Boy Sotto and Angel Locsin | Drama, romance | |
| I Will Survive | May 5 | Joel Lamangan | Maricel Soriano, Dina Bonnevie, Judy Ann Santos, Eric Quizon, Richard Gutierrez, Pilita Corrales and Serena Dalrymple | Comedy | |
| Singles | June 9 | Mac Alejandre | Ara Mina, Aubrey Miles and Angel Locsin | Romantic comedy | |
| Sabel | June 23 | Joel Lamangan | Judy Ann Santos, Wendell Ramos, Iza Calzado and Sunshine Dizon | Drama | |
| Beautiful Life | July 28 | Gil Portes | Gloria Romero, Dina Bonnevie, Amy Austria, Angel Aquino, Iya Villania, Aubrey Miles and Cristine Reyes | Drama | |
| Forever My Love | November 3 | Joven Tan | Oyo Boy Sotto and Nadine Samonte | Romance, drama, horror | Good Harvest Unlimited Inc. |
| Pa-siyam | December 1 | Erik Matti | Roderick Paulate and Cherry Pie Picache | Horror, drama | Reality Entertainment |
| So Happy Together | December 25 | Joel Lamangan | Kris Aquino, Eric Quizon, Jay R, Yasmien Kurdi, Rainier Castillo, Mark Herras and Jennylyn Mercado | Comedy, drama | |
| Mano Po III: My Love | December 25 | Joel Lamangan | Vilma Santos, Christopher de Leon, Jay Manalo, Eddie Garcia, Boots Anson-Roa, Angel Locsin, Karylle and Patrick Garcia | Drama, romance | MAQ Productions |
| Aishite Imasu 1941: Mahal Kita | December 25 | Joel Lamangan | Judy Ann Santos, Dennis Trillo, Raymart Santiago, Iya Villania, Jay Manalo and Angelu de Leon | Drama, romance | BAS Films |
| Sigaw | December 25 | Yam Laranas | Angel Locsin, Richard Gutierrez, Jomari Yllana, James Blanco and Iza Calzado | Horror, thriller | MegaVision Films |

=== 2005 ===
| Title | Release date | Director | Cast | Genre(s) | Associated film production |
|---|---|---|---|---|---|
| Bahay ni Lola 2 | March 16 | Joven Tan | Dingdong Dantes, Karylle and Gloria Romero | Horror | |
| Say That You Love Me | June 1 | Mac Alejandre | Mark Herras and Jennylyn Mercado | Romantic comedy, drama | MAQ Productions |
| Happily Ever After | June 29 | Maryo J. de los Reyes | Keempee de Leon, John Prats, Maxene Magalona, Rainier Castillo, Nadine Samonte, Tyron Perez, Dion Ignacio, Nash Aguas, Jade Lopez, Ahron Villena, Chris Martin, Lloyd Samartino, Pinky Amador, Nova Villa and Yasmien Kurdi | Romantic comedy, drama | MAQ Productions |
| Ispiritista: Itay, May Moomoo! | October 26 | Tony Y. Reyes | Vic Sotto, Cindy Kurleto, BJ Forbes and Iza Calzado | Comedy horror, fantasy | APT Films |
| Hari ng Sablay: Isang Tama, Sampung Mali | November 30 | Mac Alejandre | Bearwin Meily, Rica Peralejo, Jay R, Tuesday Vargas, Mike 'Pekto' Nacua and Paolo Contis | Comedy | |
| Shake, Rattle & Roll 2k5 | December 25 | Uro dela Cruz, Rico Maria Ilarde and Richard Somes | Ai-Ai delas Alas, Ara Mina, Tanya Garcia, Mark Anthony Fernandez, Ogie Alcasid, Gloria Romero, Yasmien Kurdi and Rainier Castillo | Horror, comedy | |
| Mano Po 4: Ako Legal Wife | December 25 | Joel Lamangan | Zsa Zsa Padilla, Rufa Mae Quinto, Jay Manalo and Cherry Pie Picache | Drama, comedy | |
| Blue Moon | December 25 | Joel Lamangan | Eddie Garcia, Boots Anson-Roa, Mark Herras, Jennylyn Mercado and Pauleen Luna | Drama, romance | |
| Mulawin: The Movie | December 25 | Dominic Zapata and Mark A. Reyes | Richard Gutierrez, Sunshine Dizon, Dennis Trillo, Zoren Legaspi, Carmina Villarroel, Angel Locsin, Bianca King, Valerie Concepcion, Dingdong Dantes and Karylle | Fantasy, romance, drama | GMA Films |

=== 2006 ===
| Title | Release date | Director | Cast | Genre(s) | Associated film production |
|---|---|---|---|---|---|
| I Will Always Love You | February 8 | Mac Alejandre | Richard Gutierrez and Angel Locsin | Drama, romance | GMA Films |
| Pamahiin | April 19 | Rahyan Carlos | Dennis Trillo, Iya Villania, Marian Rivera and Paolo Contis | Horror, thriller | |
| Manay Po | May 31 | Joel Lamangan | Cherry Pie Picache, John Prats, Polo Ravales, Jiro Manio, LJ Reyes and Glaiza de Castro | Comedy, drama, family | |
| White Lady | July 19 | Jeff Tan | JC de Vera, Angelica Panganiban, Pauleen Luna, Glaiza de Castro, Iwa Moto and Gian Carlos | Horror, thriller | |
| Eternity | September 6 | Mark A. Reyes | Dingdong Dantes, Iza Calzado, Mark Herras and Jennylyn Mercado | Romance, drama | |
| TxT | October 18 | Mike Tuviera | Angel Locsin, Dennis Trillo and Oyo Boy Sotto | Drama, horror, mystery | APT Films |
| Gigil | November 22 | Jun Lana | Katrina Halili and Alfred Vargas | Comedy | |
| Super Noypi | December 25 | Quark Henares | John Prats, Polo Ravales, Katrina Halili, Jennylyn Mercado, Mark Herras and Sandara Park | Fantasy | |
| Shake, Rattle and Roll 8 | December 25 | Mike Tuviera, Rahyan Carlos, and Topel Lee | Manilyn Reynes, Sheryl Cruz, Bearwin Meily, Keempee de Leon, Iza Calzado, Keanna Reeves, Roxanne Guinoo, Joseph Bitangcol, IC Mendoza, Dino Imperial and Empress Schuck | Horror | |
| Mano Po 5: Gua Ai Di | December 25 | Joel Lamangan | Lorna Tolentino, Richard Gutierrez, Angel Locsin and Christian Bautista | Drama, romance | |
| Zsazsa Zaturnnah Ze Moveeh | December 25 | Joel Lamangan | Zsa Zsa Padilla and Pops Fernandez | Superhero, comedy | |

=== 2007 ===
| Title | Release date | Director | Cast | Genre(s) | Associated film production |
|---|---|---|---|---|---|
| The Promise | February 14 | Mike Tuviera | Richard Gutierrez and Angel Locsin | Romance, drama | GMA Films |
| Happy Hearts | March 17 | Joel Lamangan | Shaina Magdayao, Rayver Cruz, Rustom Padilla, Wendell Ramos, Jean Garcia and Tirso Cruz III | Romantic comedy | |
| Tiyanaks | July 4 | Mark A. Reyes | Rica Peralejo, Jennylyn Mercado, Mark Herras, JC De Vera and Karel Marquez | Horror, thriller | |
| My Kuya's Wedding | August 29 | Topel Lee | Ryan Agoncillo, Pauleen Luna and Maja Salvador | Drama, romance | |
| Hide and Seek | October 31 | Rahyan Carlos | Eric Quizon, Jean Garcia, Alessandra de Rossi, Ryan Eigenmann and Jennica Garcia | Horror | |
| Bahay Kubo: A Pinoy Mano Po! | December 25 | Joel Lamangan | Maricel Soriano, Eric Quizon, Marian Rivera, Shaina Magdayao, Yasmien Kurdi and Mark Herras | Drama, family | |
| Shake, Rattle and Roll 9 | December 25 | Paul Daza, Michael Tuviera and Topel Lee | Eugene Domingo, John Prats, Pauleen Luna, Katrina Halili, Roxanne Guinoo, Matt Evans, Melissa Ricks, Martin Escudero, Jewel Mische, Felix Roco, Nash Aguas, Sam Concepcion, Dennis Trillo and Lovi Poe | Horror | |
| Desperadas | December 25 | Joel Lamangan | Ruffa Gutierrez, Rufa Mae Quinto, Iza Calzado and Marian Rivera | Comedy | |

=== 2008 ===
| Title | Release date | Director | Cast | Genre(s) | Associated film production |
|---|---|---|---|---|---|
| My Best Friend's Girlfriend | February 13 | Mark A. Reyes | Richard Gutierrez and Marian Rivera | Romance | GMA Films |
| Manay Po 2: Overload | April 16 | Joel Lamangan | Cherry Pie Picache, Rufa Mae Quinto, Polo Ravales, John Prats and Jiro Manio | Comedy, family | |
| My Monster Mom | July 2 | Jose Javier Reyes | Ruffa Gutierrez and Annabelle Rama | Comedy, family | GMA Films |
| Loving You | August 20 | Don Cuaresma | Yasmien Kurdi, JC de Vera, Jean Garcia, John Prats, Kris Bernal and Aljur Abrenica | Romance | |
| Mag-ingat Ka Sa... Kulam | October 1 | Jun Lana | Judy Ann Santos and Dennis Trillo | Horror, suspense, thriller | |
| One True Love | November 19 | Mac Alejandre | Dingdong Dantes, Marian Rivera, Iza Calzado and Bianca King | Romance | GMA Films |
| Desperadas 2 | December 25 | Joel Lamangan | Ruffa Gutierrez, Rufa Mae Quinto, Iza Calzado, Marian Rivera and Ogie Alcasid | Comedy | |
| Shake, Rattle & Roll X | December 25 | Michael Tuviera and Topel Lee | Marian Rivera, Kim Chiu, Roxanne Guinoo, JC De Vera and Gerald Anderson | Horror, fantasy, thriller | |

=== 2009 ===
| Title | Release date | Director | Cast | Genre(s) | Associated film production |
|---|---|---|---|---|---|
| When I Met U | February 11 | Joel Lamangan | Richard Gutierrez, KC Concepcion, Alfred Vargas and Iya Villania | Romance | GMA Films |
| Oh, My Girl!: A Laugh Story | July 29 | Dante Nico Garcia | Judy Ann Santos, Ogie Alcasid, Roderick Paulate, Carmi Martin and Regine Velasquez | Comedy | |
| Tarot | August 26 | Jun Lana | Marian Rivera, Dennis Trillo and Roxanne Guinoo | Horror, thriller | |
| Nandito Ako Nagmamahal Sa'Yo | September 30 | Maryo J. de los Reyes | Aljur Abrenica and Kris Bernal | Romance | |
| Mano Po 6: A Mother's Love | December 25 | Joel Lamangan | Sharon Cuneta, Zsa Zsa Padilla, Kris Aquino, Zoren Legaspi, Boots Anson-Roa, Christopher de Leon and Heart Evangelista | Drama | |
| Shake, Rattle & Roll XI | December 25 | Jessel Monteverde, Rico Gutierrez and Don Michael Perez | Zoren Legaspi, Ruffa Gutierrez, Mark Anthony Fernandez, Rayver Cruz, Iya Villania, Jennica Garcia, Martin Escudero, Maja Salvador and Megan Young | Horror, drama, thriller | |

== 2010s ==
=== 2010 ===
| Title | Release date | Director | Cast | Genre(s) | Associated film production |
|---|---|---|---|---|---|
| You to Me Are Everything | May 5 | Mark A. Reyes | Dingdong Dantes, Marian Rivera, Roxanne Barcelo, Isabel Oli and Bela Padilla | Romantic comedy | GMA Pictures |
| Mamarazzi | August 25 | Joel Lamangan | Eugene Domingo, John Lapus, Diether Ocampo, Carla Abellana and Andi Eigenmann | Comedy | Regal Multimedia Inc. |
| White House | October 20 | Topel Lee | Iza Calzado, Gabby Concepcion, Lovi Poe, Megan Young, Sarah Lahbati and Joem Bascon | Horror | Regal Multimedia Inc. |
| Shake, Rattle and Roll 12 | December 25 | Zoren Legaspi, Topel Lee and Jerrold Tarog | Shaina Magdayao, Carla Abellana, Andi Eigenmann, John Lapus, Rayver Cruz and Sid Lucero | Horror | Regal Multimedia Inc. |
| Super Inday and the Golden Bibe | December 25 | Mike Tuviera | Marian Rivera, John Lapus, Jake Cuenca and Pokwang | Fantasy, comedy | Regal Multimedia Inc. |

=== 2011 ===
| Title | Release date | Director | Cast | Genre(s) | Associated film production |
|---|---|---|---|---|---|
| My Valentine Girls | February 9 | Chris Martinez, Andoy Ranay and Dominic Zapata | Lovi Poe, Richard Gutierrez, Rhian Ramos, Solenn Heussaff and Eugene Domingo | Romance | GMA Films |
| Temptation Island | July 6 | Chris Martinez | Marian Rivera, Heart Evangelista, Rufa Mae Quinto, Lovi Poe, Solenn Heussaff and John Lapus | Comedy | GMA Films |
| My Neighbor's Wife | September 14 | Jun Lana | Lovi Poe, Dennis Trillo, Carla Abellana and Jake Cuenca | Drama, romance | |
| Aswang | November 2 | Jerrold Tarog | Lovi Poe, Paulo Avelino, Jillian Ward and Albie Casiño | Horror | |
| Shake, Rattle & Roll 13 | December 25 | Richard Somes, Jerrold Tarog and Chris Martinez | Eugene Domingo, Zanjoe Marudo, Louise delos Reyes, Sam Concepcion, Hiro Peralta, Edgar Allan Guzman, Maricar Reyes, Bugoy Cariño and Kathryn Bernardo | Horror | |
| Yesterday, Today, Tomorrow | December 25 | Jun Lana | Maricel Soriano, Gabby Concepcion, Jericho Rosales, Carla Abellana, Paulo Avelino, Lovi Poe, Solenn Heussaff and Eula Caballero | Drama, romance | Studio5 and Regal Multimedia Inc. |

=== 2012 ===
| Title | Release date | Director | Cast | Genre(s) | Associated film production |
|---|---|---|---|---|---|
| The Mommy Returns | May 9 | Joel Lamangan | Gabby Concepcion, Ruffa Gutierrez and Pokwang | Comedy horror | |
| Boy Pick-Up: The Movie | June 6 | Dominic Zapata | Ogie Alcasid, Solenn Heussaff and Dennis Trillo | Comedy | GMA Films |
| Guni-Guni | August 22 | Tara Illenberger | Lovi Poe, Benjamin Alves and Empress Schuck | Horror, thriller | |
| Pridyider | September 19 | Rico Ilarde | Andi Eigenmann, JM de Guzman and Janice de Belen | Horror | |
| Shake, Rattle and Roll Fourteen: The Invasion | December 25 | Chito S. Roño | Vhong Navarro, Lovi Poe, Janice de Belen, Herbert Bautista, Dennis Trillo, Paulo Avelino, Martin Escudero, Dimples Romana, Makisig Morales and Ella Cruz | Horror, sci-fi | |

=== 2013 ===
| Title | Release date | Director | Cast | Genre(s) | Associated film production |
|---|---|---|---|---|---|
| Seduction | January 30 | Peque Gallaga | Richard Gutierrez, Solenn Heussaff and Sarah Lahbati | Romance, drama | |
| The Bride and the Lover | May 1 | Joel Lamangan | Lovi Poe, Paulo Avelino and Jennylyn Mercado | Romance, drama | |
| My Lady Boss | July 3 | Jade Castro | Richard Gutierrez and Marian Rivera | Romantic comedy | GMA Films |
| Status: It's Complicated | November 6 | Chris Martinez | Maja Salvador, Jake Cuenca, Paulo Avelino, Solenn Heussaff and Eugene Domingo | Comedy | |
| Pagpag: Siyam na Buhay | December 25 | Frasco S. Mortiz | Kathryn Bernardo, Daniel Padilla, Paulo Avelino and Shaina Magdayao | Horror, thriller | Star Cinema |

=== 2014 ===
| Title | Release date | Director | Cast | Genre(s) | Associated film production |
|---|---|---|---|---|---|
| Third Eye | February 26 | Aloy Adlawan | Carla Abellana, Camille Prats, Denise Laurel and Ejay Falcon | Horror, suspense, thriller | |
| Da Possessed | April 19 | Joyce E. Bernal | Vhong Navarro, Solenn Heussaff, Empoy and John Lapus | Comedy horror | Star Cinema |
| So It's You | May 7 | Jun Lana | Carla Abellana, Tom Rodriguez and JC de Vera | Romantic comedy | |
| Once a Princess | August 6 | Laurice Guillen | Erich Gonzales, Enchong Dee and JC de Vera | Romance, drama | Skylight Films |
| Somebody to Love | August 20 | Jose Javier Reyes | Carla Abellana, Matteo Guidicelli, Isabelle Daza, Jason Abalos, Ella Cruz and Iza Calzado | Romantic comedy | |
| Dementia (distribution only) | September 24 | Jun Lana | Nora Aunor, Jasmine Curtis, Bing Loyzaga, and Chynna Ortaleza | Horror, suspense, thriller | Octobertrain Films and The IdeaFirst Company |
| Dilim | October 22 | Jose Javier Reyes | Kylie Padilla and Rayver Cruz | Horror, suspense, thriller | |
| Shake, Rattle & Roll XV | December 25 | Dondon Santos, Jerrold Tarog and Perci Intalan | Dennis Trillo, Carla Abellana, Erich Gonzales, JC de Vera, Matteo Guidicelli and Lovi Poe | Horror | |

=== 2015 ===
| Title | Release date | Director | Cast | Genre(s) | Associated film production |
|---|---|---|---|---|---|
| You're Still the One | May 27 | Chris Martinez | Dennis Trillo, Ellen Adarna, Richard Yap and Maja Salvador | Romance, drama | Star Cinema |
| Resureksyon | September 23 | Borgy Torre | Isabelle Daza, Paulo Avelino, Jasmine Curtis-Smith, John Lapus, Alex Castro, Raikko Mateo and Niño Muhlach | Horror, suspense, thriller | Reality Entertainment |
| The Prenup | October 14 | Jun Lana | Jennylyn Mercado and Sam Milby | Romantic comedy | |
| No Boyfriend Since Birth | November 11 | Jose Javier Reyes | Carla Abellana, Tom Rodriguez, Mike Tan and Bangs Garcia | Romantic comedy | |
| Haunted Mansion | December 25 | Jun Robles Lana | Janella Salvador, Marlo Mortel and Jerome Ponce | Horror, thriller | |

=== 2016 ===
| Title | Release date | Director | Cast | Genre(s) | Associated film production |
|---|---|---|---|---|---|
| Love Is Blind | February 10 | Jason Paul Laxamana | Derek Ramsay, Solenn Heussaff, Kean Cipriano, Chynna Ortaleza and Kiray Celis | Romantic comedy | |
| I Love You To Death | July 6 | Miko Livelo | Kiray Celis, Michelle Vito, Devon Seron, Katrina Legaspi, Shine Kuk, Jon Lucas and Enchong Dee | Horror, romantic comedy | The IdeaFirst Company |
| That Thing Called Tanga Na | August 10 | Joel Lamangan | Angeline Quinto, Billy Crawford, Martin Escudero, Kean Cipriano and Eric Quizon | Romantic comedy, parody | |
| My Rebound Girl | September 28 | Emmanuel Dela Cruz | Alex Gonzaga and Joseph Marco | Romantic comedy | |
| The Escort | November 2 | Enzo Williams | Derek Ramsay, Lovi Poe and Christopher de Leon | Romance, drama | |
| Mano Po 7: Tsinoy | December 14 | Ian Loreños | Richard Yap, Jean Garcia, Janella Salvador, Jana Agoncillo, Paolo Carino, Enchong Dee, Jessy Mendiola, Marlo Mortel, Kean Cipriano and Jake Cuenca | Drama | |
| Die Beautiful | December 25 | Jun Robles Lana | Paolo Ballesteros, Christian Bables, Joel Torre, Gladys Reyes, Luis Alandy and Albie Casiño | Drama | |

=== 2017 ===
| Title | Release date | Director | Cast | Genre(s) | Associated film production |
|---|---|---|---|---|---|
| Foolish Love | January 25 | Joel Lamangan | Angeline Quinto, Miho Nishida, Tommy Esguerra and Jake Cuenca | Romantic comedy | |
| Pwera Usog | March 8 | Jason Paul Laxamana | Joseph Marco, Devon Seron, Albie Casiño, Kiko Estrada, Sofia Andres, Eula Valdez and Aiko Melendez | Horror, suspense, thriller | |
| Northern Lights: A Journey to Love | March 29 | Dondon S. Santos | Piolo Pascual, Yen Santos and Raikko Mateo | Drama | Spring Films, Star Cinema |
| Our Mighty Yaya | May 17 | Jose Javier Reyes | Ai-Ai delas Alas, Megan Young, Sofia Andres, Allyson McBride, Lucas Enrique and Zoren Legaspi | Comedy | Regal Multimedia Inc. |
| Woke Up Like This | August 23 | Joel Ferrer | Vhong Navarro, Lovi Poe, Joey Marquez, Bayani Agbayani, Dionne Monsanto, Cora Waddell, Raikko Mateo, Nonong Balinan and Yna Asistio | Comedy, family | |
| The Debutantes | October 4 | Prime Cruz | Sue Ramirez, Miles Ocampo, Michelle Vito, Jane De Leon and Chanel Morales | Horror, suspense, thriller | The IdeaFirst Company |
| This Time I'll Be Sweeter | November 8 | Joel Lamangan | Barbie Forteza and Ken Chan | Romantic comedy, drama | Regal Multimedia Inc. |
| Haunted Forest | December 25 | Ian Loreños | Jane Oineza, Jameson Blake, Jon Lucas, Maris Racal, Raymart Santiago and Betong Sumaya | Horror, thriller, suspense | |

=== 2018 ===
| Title | Release date | Director | Cast | Genre(s) | Associated film production |
|---|---|---|---|---|---|
| Mama's Girl | January 17 | Connie Macatuno | Sylvia Sanchez, Diego Loyzaga, Jameson Blake, Karen Reyes, Heaven Peralejo and Sofia Andres | Comedy, drama | |
| My Fairy Tail Love Story | February 14 | Perci Intalan | Janella Salvador, Kiko Estrada, Elmo Magalona, Dominic Ochoa, Dimples Romana and Gabby Nagayama | Fantasy, romantic comedy, drama | The IdeaFirst Company |
| My 2 Mommies | May 9 | Eric Quizon | Paolo Ballesteros, Solenn Heussaff and Maricel Soriano | Comedy, drama | Regal Multimedia Inc. |
| So Connected | May 23 | Jason Paul Laxamana | Janella Salvador and Jameson Blake | Romantic comedy | |
| Walwal | June 27 | Jose Javier Reyes | Elmo Magalona, Jane De Leon, Kiko Estrada, Donny Pangilinan, Kisses Delavin, Devon Seron and Jerome Ponce | Romance, drama | Star Cinema (uncredited) |
| Unli Life | August 15 | Miko Livelo | Vhong Navarro, Winwyn Marquez, Ejay Falcon, Jon Lucas, Donna Cariaga and Joey Marquez | Comedy, fantasy | |
| Signal Rock | August 15 | Chito S. Roño | Christian Bables | Drama | CSR Production |
| The Hopeful Romantic | September 12 | Topel Lee | Ritz Azul, Alora Sasam, Wacky Kiray, Pepe Herrera, Nikko Natividad, DJ Durano and Joey Marquez | Romantic comedy | |
| Wild and Free | October 10 | Connie Macatuno | Derrick Monasterio and Sanya Lopez | Romance, drama | Regal Multimedia Inc. |
| Recipe for Love | November 21 | Jose Javier Reyes | Christian Bables and Cora Waddell | Romantic comedy | Largavista |
| One Great Love | December 25 | Eric Quizon | Dennis Trillo, Kim Chiu, JC de Vera, Niña Dolino and Eric Quizon | Romance, drama | |

=== 2019 ===
| Title | Release date | Director | Cast | Genre(s) | Associated film production |
|---|---|---|---|---|---|
| Elise | February 6 | Joel Ferrer | Janine Gutierrez and Enchong Dee | Romantic comedy, drama | Regal Multimedia, Inc. |
| Time & Again | February 20 | Jose Javier Reyes | Wynwyn Marquez and Enzo Pineda | Romance, drama | |
| Papa Pogi | March 20 | Alex Calleja | Teddy Corpuz and Myrtle Sarrosa | Romantic comedy | |
| Stranded | April 10 | Ice Idanan | Jessy Mendiola and Arjo Atayde | Romance, drama | |
| Finding You | May 29 | Easy Ferrer | Jerome Ponce, Jane Oineza and Barbie Imperial | Romance, drama | |
| Because I Love You | June 26 | Joel Lamangan | David Licauco and Shaira Diaz | Romantic comedy, drama | |
| Mina-Anud | August 21 | Kerwin Go | Dennis Trillo, Jerald Napoles, Dionne Monsanto and Matteo Guidicelli | Drama, crime, comedy | Epic Media; HOOQ |
| Cuddle Weather | September 13 | Rod Marmol | Sue Ramirez and RK Bagatsing | Romance, drama | Project 8 corner San Joaquin Projects |
| Ang Henerasyong Sumuko Sa Love | October 2 | Jason Paul Laxamana | Jerome Ponce, Jane Oineza, Albie Casiño, Myrtle Sarrosa and Tony Labrusca | Romance, drama | |
| The Annulment | November 13 | Mac Alejandre | Lovi Poe and Joem Bascon | Drama | |
| The Heiress | November 27 | Frasco Mortiz | Janella Salvador, Maricel Soriano and Sunshine Cruz | Horror | |

== 2020s ==
=== 2020 ===
| Title | Release date | Director | Cast | Genre(s) | Associated film production |
|---|---|---|---|---|---|
| D' Ninang | January 22 | GB Sampedro | Kisses Delavin, McCoy de Leon, Mariel de Leon and Ai-Ai delas Alas | Comedy, romance | Regal Multimedia, Inc. |
| Us Again | February 26 | Joy Aquino | RK Bagatsing and Jane Oineza | Romance | |
| The Missing | December 25 | Easy Ferrer | Joseph Marco, Ritz Azul, and Miles Ocampo | Horror | |

=== 2021 ===
| Title | Release date | Director | Cast | Genre(s) | Associated film production |
|---|---|---|---|---|---|
| Mommy Issues | May 7 | Jose Javier Reyes | Pokwang, Sue Ramirez, Jerome Ponce, Ryan Bang and Gloria Diaz | Comedy, drama | GMA Pictures |
| A Girl & A Guy | June 24 | Erik Matti | Donna Cariaga and Rosh Barman | Romantic comedy | Globe Studios |
| Rabid | November 12 | Erik Matti | Donna Cariaga, Brace Arquiza, and Ayeesha Cervantes | Horror | Reality Entertainment |

=== 2022 ===
| Title | Release date | Director | Cast | Genre(s) | Associated film production |
|---|---|---|---|---|---|
| Day Zero | October | Joey de Guzman | Brandon Vera, MJ Lastimosa, and Pepe Herrera | Horror | |

=== 2023 ===
| Title | Release date | Director | Cast | Genre(s) | Associated film production |
|---|---|---|---|---|---|
| Ang Mga Kaibigan ni Mama Susan | May 18 | Chito S. Roño | Joshua Garcia and Angie Ferro | Horror | Black Sheep Productions, Top Story |
| Seasons | July 7 | Easy Ferrer | Lovi Poe and Carlo Aquino | Romance, drama | |
| Shake, Rattle & Roll Extreme | November 29 | Richard V. Somes, Jerrold Tarog, Joey de Guzman | Iza Calzado, Jane Oineza, Jane De Leon, Miggs Cuaderno, RK Bagatsing, Paul Salas, AC Bonifacio, Paolo Gumabao, and Rob Gomez | Horror | |

=== 2024 ===
| Title | Release date | Director | Cast | Genre(s) | Associated film production |
|---|---|---|---|---|---|
| Bantay-Bahay | May 1 | Jose Javier Reyes | Pepe Herrera | Horror | |
| That Kind of Love | July 10 | Catherine O. Camarillo | Barbie Forteza and David Licauco | Romantic comedy | Pocket Media Productions, Inc. Happy Infinite Productions, Inc. |
| Love Child | August 2 | Jonathan Jurilla | RK Bagatsing, Jane Oineza, and John Tyrron Ramos | Drama | Southern Lantern Studios |
| Guilty Pleasure | October 16 | Connie Macatuno | Lovi Poe, JM De Guzman, and Jameson Blake | Erotic drama | C’est Lovi Productions |
| My Future You | December 25 | Crisanto Aquino | Seth Fedelin and Francine Diaz | Romantic comedy | |

=== 2025 ===
| Title | Release date | Director | Cast | Genre(s) | Associated film production |
|---|---|---|---|---|---|
| The Caretakers | February 26 | Shugo Praico | Iza Calzado and Dimples Romana | Horror | Rein Entertainment |
| Untold | April 30 | Derick Cabrido | Jodi Sta. Maria | Horror | |
| Cheat Day | June 11 | Jose Javier Reyes | Alexa Miro and Derrick Monasterio | Romance | |
| Shake, Rattle & Roll: Evil Origins | December 25 | Shugo Praico, Joey De Guzman, & Ian Loreños | Richard Gutierrez, Ivana Alawi, Carla Abellana, Janice de Belen, Manilyn Reynes, Loisa Andalio, Francine Diaz, Seth Fedelin, Fyang Smith, JM Ibarra, Dustin Yu, Ysabel Ortega, Ashley Ortega, Elijah Alejo, and Kaila Estrada | Horror | |
| Love You So Bad | December 25 | Mae Cruz-Alviar | Will Ashley, Bianca de Vera, Dustin Yu | Romance | ABS-CBN Studios, GMA Pictures, Star Cinema |

=== 2026 ===
| Title | Release date | Director | Cast | Genre(s) | Associated film production |
|---|---|---|---|---|---|
| Almost Us | May 6 | Dan Villegas | JM Ibarra and Fyang Smith | Romantic comedy | Project 8 Projects |
| Project Baby | June 10 | Eric Quizon | Sue Ramirez and Rico Blanco | Romantic comedy | |
