= Gigil (disambiguation) =

Gigil is a Philippine advertising agency.

Gigil may also refer to:

- Cute aggression, the urge to squeeze or bite cute things
- Gigil, a 2006 Regal Entertainment film
- "Gigil", a January 2017 episode of Ika-6 na Utos
- "Gigil", a July 2017 episode of La Luna Sangre
- "Gigil", a 2024 single by BGYO
