= Lucio Margallo =

1992 action film by Augusto Salvador and starring Phillip Salvador

- Directed by: Augusto Salvador
- Written by: Jun Lawas
- Produced by: Wally Chua; Victor Villegas
- Starring: Phillip Salvador; Miguel Rodriguez; Tirso Cruz III; Jean Garcia; Paquito Diaz; Edwin Reyes
- Cinematography: Sergio Lobo
- Edited by: Rene Tala; Danny Gloria
- Music by: Mon del Rosario
- Production company: Moviestars Production
- Distributed by: Moviestars Production
- Release date: July 22, 1992
- Running time: 120 minutes
- Country: Philippines
- Language: Filipino

Lucio Margallo is a 1992 Filipino biographical action film directed by Augusto Salvador. The film stars Phillip Salvador as the titular policeman, alongside Miguel Rodriguez, Tirso Cruz III, Jean Garcia, Paquito Diaz and Edwin Reyes. The film depicts the true story of police officer Margallo and his partner Sgt. Goyena (Cruz) of the Western Police District (WPD) who come to face off against a dangerous drug syndicate with ties to officials from their own police agency. Produced by Moviestars Production, the film was released on July 22, 1992.

Critic Justino Dormiendo of the Manila Standard gave Lucio Margallo a positive review, commending its action scenes and performances which helped the film overcome its formulaic plot. The film won the FAMAS Award for Best Editing (Rene Tala and Danny Gloria), tying with Ikaw Pa Lang ang Minahal.

The film is streaming online on YouTube.

== Cast ==
- Phillip Salvador as Lucio Margallo
- Miguel Rodriguez as Alexander Sarmiento
- Tirso Cruz III as Sgt. Goyena
- Jean Garcia as Hermie Margallo
- Odette Khan as Candeng
- Dencio Padilla as Temyong
- Paquito Diaz as Dante
- Edwin Reyes as Bigboy
- Zandro Zamora as Maj. Razon
- Johnny Vicar as Maj. Gamboa
- Max Laurel as the mayor
- Eric Francisco as Manoling
- Bunny Paras as Elena
- Karen Salas as Karen
- Fred Moro as Palos
- Bernard Atienza as Turo
- Eric Borbon as Balbon
- Renato del Prado as Pedring
- Jason Bonus as Buboy
- Treisha Rodil as Baby
- Janus del Prado as Goyena's son
- Melissa Sosa as Goyena's daughter
- Abegail Roque as Goyena's daughter
- Manjo del Mundo as Berto
- King Gutierrez as Turko
- Jimmy Reyes as Jim Boy
- Tony Tacorda as the warden
- Rey Solo as Bulak
- Polly Cadsawan as Mendez
- Joey Padilla as Dizon
- Rene Hawkins as Bombay
- Jerome Advincula as Junior Buwang

== Release ==
Lucio Margallo was released in theaters on July 22, 1992.

=== Critical response ===
Justino Dormiendo, writing for the Manila Standard, gave the film a positive review. Though he found it to be compromised by "formula filmmaking," he commended the film's well-staged action scenes, "literate dialogue" and the "convincing" performances of Salvador, Cruz and Diaz, leading him to consider that the film "acquits itself exceedingly well." Dormiendo concluded that "We can only hope that the next time Salvador and company flex their cinematic muscles, the territory would be less than compromising..."

== Accolades ==
Group	Category	Name	Result
FAMAS Awards	Best Editing	Rene Tala and Danny Gloria	Won
