= Maggie de la Riva rape case =

1967 crime in Manila, Philippines

Maggie de la Riva
- Born: Magdalena de la Riva; September 3, 1942 (age 84); Manila, Commonwealth of the Philippines
- Occupation: Actress

Magdalena "Maggie" de la Riva (born September 3, 1942) is a Filipina actress who was abducted in front of her home in New Manila, Quezon City on June 26, 1967 by four men, all of whom were sons of influential families, and taken to a motor hotel where she was abused and raped. Her case became one of the most publicized rape cases in Philippine history.

== Maggie de la Riva ==
Maggie de la Riva was born in Manila to Pilar Torrente (Spanish mestiza) and Juan de la Riva (German Swiss mestizo). Her relatives include singer Ana Rivera and actress Marianne dela Riva.

In 1958, de la Riva completed elementary and high school at Miriam College (then known as Maryknoll College) and finished secretarial training in 1960 at Saint Theresa's College. In 1963, she was selected as one of the top five finalists for the beauty pageant Miss Caltex of 1963. In that same year, de la Riva also represented Filipino gowns for the Fashion Guild of the Philippines under the designer "Millie's Gowns". In 1964, she was hired as a brand promoter for "Respect the Centavo", a savings advertisement. Before she became an actress, she was a ballet dancer.

As a movie actress, she was paid ₱8,000 per picture. At ABS-CBN, she performed in radio broadcasts and television shows (₱800 per month in permanent shows, ₱300 per month in live promotional shows, and ₱100–200 per appearance as a guest in other shows). She was the sole breadwinner of the family after the death of her father, Juan. Her mother took care of the family.

She first appeared with Joseph Estrada in Istambay (English: Bystander). It was Estrada that gave her a break in becoming a star. Her most memorable role was in Ang Langit ay para sa Lahat, which she considers her best work. She was also a singer and was always a guest in the leading nightclubs in Manila. She had her own TV show titled Maggie on ABS 3. She was also a guest artist in Tanghalan sa Darigold and a recurring guest in Tindahan sa Nayon, a VG Television Production on MBC 11.

== Perpetrators ==
The four perpetrators, all of whom were from wealthy and influential families, were Jaime Gómez José, Edgardo Payumo Aquino, Basílio Pineda, Jr., and Rogelio Sevilla Cañal.

Jaime Gómez José, 21, was the son of José, a prominent doctor from Pampanga, and Dolores, a businesswoman from another province in the Philippines. He resided at 21 Kalatagan Street, Makati (then part of the Rizal Province until 1975 when it seceded with other cities to form the present-day Metro Manila). José had finished high school two years prior, was an engineering student of De La Salle University (then called De La Salle College) and the leader of a band named "Jaime José and the Deltas".

Edgardo Payumo Aquino was a second year journalism student and son of a lawyer. He resided at 172 Mayon Street, Quezon City.

Basílio Pineda, Jr. was the son of a retired Makati and Pasay police chief. He resided at 184 Marconi Street, Makati, Rizal. He was also a known member of gangs that assaulted celebrities and starlets.

Rogelio Sevilla Cañal was an architecture student and the son of a former principal. He resided at 936 Palawan Street, Sampaloc, Manila and was a Negros Island native.

== Crime ==
Maggie de la Riva rape case
- Date: June 26, 1967
- Location: Manila, Philippines
- Accused: Jaime José; Basilio Pineda, Jr.; Rogelio Cañal; Edgardo Aquino
- Charges: Kidnapping, gang rape
- Trial: July 11 – October 2, 1967
- Verdict: Guilty
- Convictions: Abduction, rape
- Sentence: Death by electrocution

On the night of June 26, 1967, Rogelio Cañal and Edgardo Aquino visited Jaime José's residence to borrow his red Pontiac convertible. The latter refused but later relented on the condition that he could tag along. The trio then headed to a well-known nightclub where they had drinks and it is here that they met Basílio Pineda Jr., who confessed his love for Maggie de la Riva. He later revealed knowledge of her taping session at the ABS studio. The four men (including Pineda) drove to the venue with Pineda driving, arriving at 4:30 a.m., exactly as de la Riva finished a late recording.

With her assistant Helen Calderón in the passenger seat, de la Riva drove to their home in New Manila, with the four men following them. As they arrived, the four men blasted the Pontiac horn, causing de la Riva to accelerate to avoid a collision. De la Riva's car hit a post near her residence, so she rolled down her window and shouted at Pineda, who flashed blinding headlights on her. One of the occupants of José’s car dismounted, grabbed de la Riva’s left arm, and forcefully dragging her towards the red Pontiac. Calderón tried to wrest her free, but was pushed away by the abductor.

De la Riva was shoved into the backseat, three men held her down by her limbs and neck. They whispered expletives into her ear while touching her sexually, as Pineda drove away.

=== The rape ===
During the ordeal, de la Riva pleaded for her life and safety, telling the men that her family depended on her since her father died. Edgardo Aquino scoffed in reply, stating that it was actually better for them (the abductors), since no man would seek revenge given that her father was dead.

Upon reaching Pasay City, the four took de la Riva to a rundown motel, called Swanky Hotel. José then blindfolded de la Riva as they exited the car and walked inside, which was stated to be owned by Pineda. Cañal led her up into a room. To keep de la Riva obedient, they threatened to pour acid on her face if she tried to resist.

Inside the room, the group locked the door and placed de la Riva on the bed, removing her blindfold. Pineda then instructed her to dance while disrobing, with the three other men watching. Reluctantly, de la Riva did as instructed. But after a while, the quartet grew impatient and decided to undress her themselves.

José then became the first to rape de la Riva, followed by Aquino, Pineda, then Cañal. De la Riva drifted in and out of consciousness during the assault.

Following the rape, the four redressed her and headed to an alleyway near the former Philippines Free Press Building in Quiapo, where they warned de la Riva to keep quiet. The men told her that they would post bail and hunt her down if she went to the police, threatening again to melt off her face with acid. The quartet then flagged a cab from a lesser-known company and told the driver to take her back to her residence. The taxi driver later testified in court that de la Riva was frantic, always looking back and asking if another vehicle was tailing them.

== The People v. Jaime Jose y Gomez ==
=== Trial ===
After de la Riva recovered, she and her family filed a rape case in the Quezon City Court of First Instance (the predecessor to the Regional Trial Court system). Estanislao Fernández offered his services to the family. Former assistant Quezon City fiscal Oscar "Oca" Inocentes was the public prosecutor, who later became a Quezon City Judge.

José was the first apprehended near his home, as he was walking along Buendia Avenue and the arresting officers working undercover as ice cream vendors. After learning of his arrest, Pineda, Cañal, and Aquino fled to Batangas where they dined at a restaurant and stayed at a resthouse using false names. They moved to another resthouse where Cañal and Pineda were arrested, while Aquino escaped to Taal. After days of hiding, Aquino surrendered to the wife of the Batangas governor.

De la Riva moved from her home in New Manila to a safehouse in Camp Crame after she was threatened. The trial began on July 11, 1967, in the Quezon City Court of First Instance, presided by Lourdes Paredes San Diego. Pineda claimed they had raped and assaulted de la Riva as retribution for hitting their car. In addition, he claimed to have bribed de la Riva for ₱1,000 for a striptease, asserting that she had willingly complied.

On October 2, 1967, the Court found all of the accused guilty of committing forcible abduction with rape under Article 335 of the Revised Penal Code and sentenced each of them to death by electrocution, along with a ₱10,000 penalty each to indemnify de la Riva.

== Appeals and executions ==
=== Imprisonment and appeals ===
The four men were sent to Muntinlupa National Penitentiary during the appeals process.

On December 28, 1970, Rogelio Cañal died from a drug overdose, less than seventeen months before the executions. In a per curiam judgment in G.R. No. L-28232 on February 6, 1971, the Supreme Court modified the RTC decision, to declare the following:

"... appellants Jaime G. Jose, Rogelio Sevilla, Basilio Pineda, Jr., and Edgardo P. Aquino are pronounced guilty of the complex crime of forcible abduction with rape, and each and every one of them is likewise convicted of three (3) other crimes of rape. As a consequence thereof, each of them is hereby sentenced to four (4) death penalties; all of them shall, jointly and severally, indemnify the complainant of the sum of ₱10,000 in each of the four crimes, or a total of ₱40,000; and each shall pay one-fourth (1/4) of the costs."

=== Executions ===
The remaining three rapists were executed by electric chair on May 17, 1972, by direct order of President Ferdinand Marcos, with the proceedings broadcast on national radio.

On the day of their execution, the condemned ate a breakfast of fried chicken with bread and coffee, then had their heads shaved at 10:00 a.m. Their last meal was a lunch of rice, kare-kare, chicken tinola, lobster, crispy pata, lechon, fried lapu-lapu, and ice cream. The condemned were said to have been weeping uncontrollably during a radio interview.

At their execution, the horde of reporters was divided into three groups to witness each execution. Jaime José was the first to enter the death chamber. As he was strapped to the chair, he entered a state of shock after being sedated. He spent his last moments weeping as his face was covered with a leather mask, his bare feet resting on a wet block of quarrystone. Among the witnesses was his father, José, who had promised his son that he would be present in his final moments. His mother, Dolores, was at Malacañang Palace for a private audience with the President to beg for a last-minute pardon, which Marcos declined because of widespread public anger over the incident. José was executed when three prison guards activated switches to the electric chair, of which only one was live. After the initial shock, when the prison doctor found him still alive, it was debated whether he should be taken back to his cell since he survived the first shock. He was given another application of current and was pronounced dead at 3:20 p.m.

Basílio Pineda, the second to be executed, was forcibly dragged to the death chamber and was pronounced dead at 3:55 p.m. The final convict to be executed, Edgardo Aquino, was the only condemned who appeared to show remorse for the crime. A prison chaplain, the head of the prison guards, and a doctor heard his last words as a final admonition: "Avoid bad companions and obey your parents." He was pronounced dead at 4:10 p.m.

The three men's bodies were taken to the Bilibid Hospital morgue for final identification and claimed the next day by relatives. José had his casket closed for the entire duration of his wake until his burial.

== Aftermath and legacy ==
The criminal proceedings and executions of each condemned man were broadcast on public radio station DZRH, causing sensationalism and mass hysteria. De la Riva's ordeal also pioneered public discourse of rape in the Philippines.

On March 6, 2017, de la Riva maintained on national television that the death penalty should still be a part of judicial convictions for rape and assault cases. The death penalty had been first abolished by Corazon Aquino in 1986, only to be restored later by Fidel V. Ramos, with the main method changed to lethal injection. President Gloria Macapagal-Arroyo suspended the death penalty in 2006 following pressure from the Catholic Church, and it remains so to this day.

De la Riva hopes rape, along with all "heinous crimes," would be included in the crimes punishable by death. De la Riva stated "I've already forgiven, but forgiveness does not mean that you will not allow the law to take its course. Yung actions nila, pagbabayaran nila (They would have to pay the consequences of their actions),” she said. In a vote of 216 "in favor" over 54 "against" with 1 "abstain" House Bill 4727 (the revival of the death penalty) passed its third and final hearing in the House of Representatives.

The hotel where the rape happened has since been renamed Galaxy Lodge. The death row cell block where the four men were held along with the death chamber were in use until 1976, when the electric chair was retired as an execution method in favour of death by firing squad. The actual electric chair used in the three executions was partially destroyed in a fire, but repaired for a museum exhibit in a new death house built for lethal injections, which is also the present Bilibid Museum. The death row cell block has been converted into a maximum security compound.

The presiding judge, Lourdes Paredes San Diego, supported capital punishment as a last resort and remained against it for the most part. In an interview on her daughter Jo’s radio show, she stated “Hija (my daughter), in the Philippines, rape is punishable by death.” San Diego was later appointed as the first female chief justice of the Court of Appeals, where she served until her retirement. She then spent her retirement teaching at the Philippine Women's University until her death. Main Avenue in Barangay Socorro, Quezon City was renamed in honor of her.

This case continuously comes up in the conversations and analyses on topics such as: the war on drugs, rape and what should constitute the death penalty, and capital punishment as a whole.

== In popular culture ==
The incident was made into a film in 1994 called The Maggie de la Riva Story (God... Why Me?). The titular character was played by actress Dawn Zulueta. Her niece, singer Ana Rivera, played her sister Medy de la Riva-Suba, and Jaime José was played by Miguel Rodríguez. De la Riva herself appeared in the film as a cameo.
