= The Maggie dela Riva Story: God... Why Me? =

1994 Filipino crime drama film

The Maggie de la Riva Story: God... Why Me?
- Theatrical release poster
- Directed by: Carlo J. Caparas
- Screenplay by: Carlo J. Caparas
- Story by: Carlo J. Caparas; Efren Montano
- Produced by: Carlo J. Caparas
- Starring: Dawn Zulueta; Miguel Rodriguez; John Regala; Michael de Mesa; Ricky Davao
- Cinematography: Boy Dominguez
- Edited by: Abelardo Hulleza
- Music by: Raul Mitra; Ryan Cayabyab
- Production companies: Viva Films; Golden Lion Films
- Distributed by: Viva Films
- Release date: July 13, 1994
- Running time: 137 minutes
- Country: Philippines
- Languages: English, Filipino, Spanish

The Maggie dela Riva Story: God... Why Me? is a 1994 Filipino crime drama film co-written and directed by Carlo J. Caparas. The film stars Dawn Zulueta in the title role, alongside Miguel Rodriguez, John Regala, Michael de Mesa, and Ricky Davao as the rapists. The film dramatizes the case of actress Maggie de la Riva's ordeal in 1967.

Released by Viva Films on July 13, 1994, the film was a box office success, becoming one of the highest-grossing Philippine films of all time.

== Plot ==
A young Maggie de la Riva finishes filming a new scene for a movie. While she and her family celebrate her big breaks in the film industry, several sex crimes involving prominent people in the society take place within the Metro Manila region, then part of Rizal Province. The crimes, committed by young men from wealthy and influential families, are done by taking the victims to a small hotel where they are sexually abused by the perpetrators. Later, Maggie falls in love with her best friend, Albert, and the two hang out on several occasions.

With the sex crime rates increasing, Maggie's family and friends, as well as the movie industry become concerned following rumors. Albert calls Maggie one night and informs her of his conversation with the production team about another rape victim, a socialite and actress. The next day, Maggie and the production team discuss filming another scene due to the absence of a cast member. During a break, a fellow cast member and Maggie theorize that little of the crimes' details are known possibly due to the shame the rape victims suffer while the perpetrators are influential. While driving home that evening, Maggie and her maid Mameng stop for refueling while a Pontiac carrying a quartet of influential men coming home from a long night of drinking followed them at the distance. After refueling, Maggie drives but the Pontiac follows them again, making swerving and dangerous moves. As both cars stop at the de la Riva household, Mameng tries to alert the inhabitants only for the four men to get out of their car and abduct Maggie while Mameng and their mother Pilar watch in horror.

The quartet, consisting of Jaime Jose, Edgardo Aquino, Basilio Pineda, and Rogelio Canal, intimidate Maggie and drive her to a motel where they silence the staff and take her to a suite. They then intimidate and abuse Maggie further, including physically beating her when she refuses to comply. The quartet undress her until she breaks down and all four men leave the room. Taking turns, Jose, Aquino, Pineda, and Canal rape Maggie and revive her with cold water as well as torture her when she goes into a state of shock. Meanwhile, Pilar calls her son-in-law and Medy's husband Ben Suba, to call in journalists and authorities and inform them of Maggie's abduction.

Back at the motel, the four perpetrators redress Maggie and threaten her with death if she breaks her silence. A taxicab takes her to her home where she is greeted by authorities and the press and comforted by Albert. In the next days, she agrees to her family's advice to file a case against the perpetrators. A manhunt operation was set to find the four suspects. Jose becomes the first to fall into the authorities while Pineda and Canal are arrested in Batangas. The last suspect Aquino surrenders days later.

Lawyer Estanislao Fernandez offers his services to Maggie after the latter meets Imelda Marcos. Maggie then moves to a heavily guarded police safehouse in Camp Crame wherein failed attempts and threats against her continue. The trial then takes place in Quezon City wherein Maggie, the witnesses, and the suspects give their testimonies. The court, presided by Lourdes Paredes San Diego, find the suspects' testimonies contemptuous. Attempts to have the four perpetrators sentenced to death by electric chair become difficult due to monetary bribes and other outside influences.

The court ultimately reaches a guilty verdict and sentences the four to death by electric chair. As more evidence on the sex crimes surface after the Supreme Court upholds the verdict of the lower court, Canal dies of a drug overdose in New Bilibid Prison. The surviving accused submit their appeals but were denied. The plan to carry out the death sentence became more difficult when executives of the justice department decide that only two will be executed. Ben Suba meets with Vicente Abad Santos, who asks him to find more hard evidence, which he eventually does. After Abad Santos receives the said evidence, which are photos of the perpetrators committing their crimes on the wealthy female victims, he calls Ferdinand Marcos in Malacanang to ask him for approval to carry out the execution.

On the day of the execution, as Maggie visits a church to pray, Jose's mother, Dolores, visits Malacanang and asks Imelda Marcos to help spare her son from death row and instead place him under life imprisonment, adding that he was only inadvertently involved in the crime. Imelda denies this appeal despite showing mercy to Dolores. While Aquino showed remorse as he walks to the death chamber and has his head shaved, Jose and Pineda are forcibly dragged to the chamber; Jose weeps and calls for his mother while Pineda freaks out and enters into a state of insanity. After a woman, a rape victim, is forcibly dragged from the death chamber, the three accused are executed via the electric chair.

Maggie and Albert meet up at their hangout spot at a beach wherein they break up their relationship due to her ordeal. In the end, the real Maggie de la Riva comforts her daughter and tells her to be strong in times of danger.

== Cast ==
- Dawn Zulueta as Maggie dela Riva
- Miguel Rodríguez as Jaime "Tisoy/Joey" José
- John Regala as Basílio Pineda, Jr.
- Ricky Davao as Eduardo Aquino
- Michael de Mesa as Rogelio Cañal
- Ali Sotto as First Lady Imelda Marcos
- Laurice Guillen as Judge Lourdes Paredes San Diego
- Tonton Gutierrez as Albert
- Liza Lorena as Alicia Vergel
- Roberto Arévalo as Atty. Estanislao Fernández
- Lito Legaspi as Col. Tomás Karingal
- Boots Anson-Roa as Pilar "Mama Pili" Torrente-dela Riva
- Tony Mabesa as Appeal Lawyer
- Mia Gutiérrez as Mameng, the Dela Riva housemaid and Maggie’s personal assistant
- Anna Rivera as Medy dela Riva-Suba
- Phillip Gamboa as Ben Suba
- Augusto Victa as Justice Vicente Abad Santos
- Marita Zóbel as Dolores José
- Maggie dela Riva as herself

== Production ==
Gabby Concepcion was initially cast as one of the rapists. However, it didn't push through due to scheduling conflicts.
