= Alfie Anido =

Filipino actor

- Born: Alfonso Serrano Anido; December 30, 1959; Manila, Philippines
- Died: December 30, 1981 (aged 22); Bel-Air Village, Makati, Metro Manila, Philippines
- Burial place: Manila Memorial Park – Sucat, Parañaque, Metro Manila
- Occupations: Actor, Model
- Years active: 1979–1981

Alfonso Serrano Anido (December 30, 1959 – December 30, 1981) was a popular Filipino matinee idol, best remembered for his mysterious sudden death at the age of 22.

== Biography ==
Anido was born on December 30, 1959, in Manila. He was the eldest of the four children of Alberto Anido and Sarah Serrano, both Spanish Mestizo. He was also the brother of Albert Anido, another Filipino actor. He was also a fashion and commercial model before he became a contract star for Regal Films, a leading Filipino film production company. He was dubbed as one of the Regal Babies, along with then-young actors such as Gabby Concepcion, William Martinez, Albert Martinez, Maricel Soriano, Snooky Serna, and Dina Bonnevie. He was famously linked with Bonnevie, his co-star in the 1980 camp classic Temptation Island. At the time of his entry into show business, he was in college at the Ateneo de Manila University studying management.

== Death ==
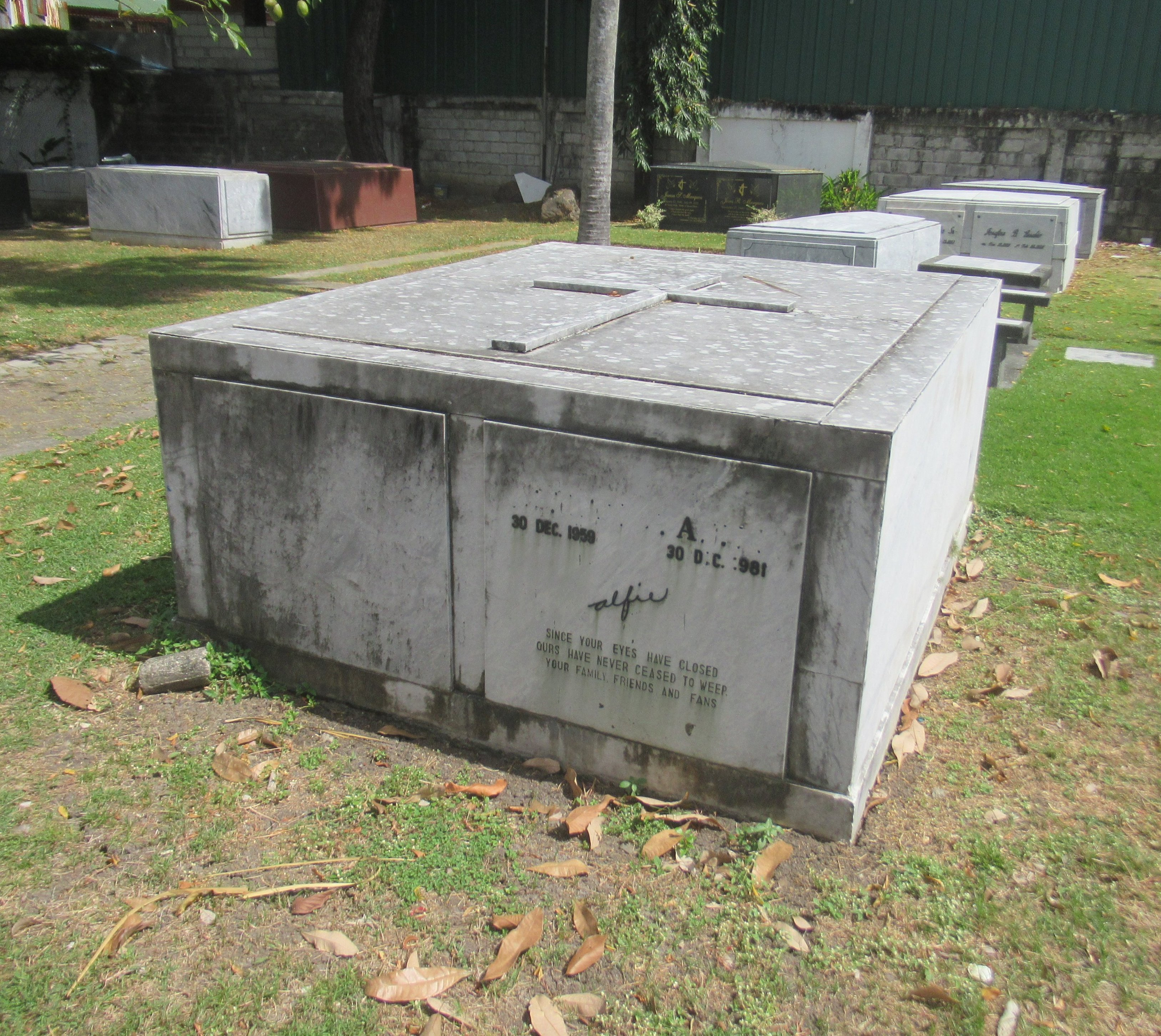
Anido's tomb at Manila Memorial Park – Sucat, Parañaque

Anido died the night of his 22nd birthday on December 30, 1981, at his home in Bel-Air, Makati. The official reason, contemporaneously reported by the mainstream media of Manila, was that Anido shot himself. This explanation has not been officially or authoritatively contradicted up to this day. However, immediately after his death, rumors quickly spread that Anido was actually murdered, and that such fact was covered up owing to the prominence of the personalities allegedly involved. Suspicion fell on the family of an ex-girlfriend of Anido, Katrina Ponce Enrile, whose father was Minister of Defense Juan Ponce Enrile, a major figure in the regime of then-President Ferdinand Marcos. The rumor subsequently gained traction given the context of widespread abuses by the regime. Jack Enrile, Katrina's brother, was rumored to have shot Anido but has denied any involvement in the actor's death.

Other versions on the death of Anido were printed in the alternative press such as the Philippine Collegian, the official student organ of the University of the Philippines.

== Filmography ==
=== Film ===
- 1980: Nympha – introducing role as Marcial (movie released March 7, 1980)
- 1980: Uhaw sa Kalayaan – Arman (movie released June 6, 1980)
- 1980: Temptation Island – Alfredo (movie released July 4, 1980)
- 1980: Katorse – Albert (movie released July 25, 1980)
- 1980: Waikiki: Sa Lupa ng Ating mga Pangarap – Ronald (movie released November 14, 1980)
- 1981: Bilibid Boys – Steve Guanzon (movie released January 16, 1981)
- 1981: Blue Jeans – Joey Amador (movie released February 20, 1981)
- 1981: Pabling – cameo role as Fredo "The Bus Conductor" (movie released July 17, 1981)
- 1981: Bilibid Gays – guest role (movie released July 31, 1981)
- 1981: Kasalanan Ba? – Benjie (movie released October 2, 1981)
- 1982: Throw Away Child – Atty. Delfin Llamzon (movie posthumously released January 8, 1982)
- 1982: Dormitoryo – Philip (the only non-Regal movie that starred Anido; movie posthumously released January 15, 1982)
- 1982: Diosa – Jun Alegre (movie posthumously released August 13, 1982)
- 1982: The Diary of Cristina Gaston – Alfredo (movie posthumously released September 24, 1982)
