= Ronquillo: Tubong Cavite, Laking Tondo =

1993 action drama film by Joey Del Rosario

- Theatrical poster
- Directed by: Joey del Rosario
- Written by: Jojo Lapus (Note: Story research and screenplay)
- Produced by: Charo Santos-Concio; Lily Y. Monteverde
- Starring: Ramon "Bong" Revilla, Jr.
- Cinematography: Pablo Bautista; Danny Bustos
- Edited by: Renato de Leon
- Music by: Nonong Buencamino
- Production companies: Regal Films; Star Cinema
- Distributed by: Star Cinema
- Release date: May 12, 1993
- Running time: 96 minutes
- Country: Philippines
- Language: Filipino
- Box office: ₱58.2 million

Ronquillo: Tubong Cavite, Laking Tondo (English: Ronquillo: Cavite Native, Raised in Tondo) is a 1993 Filipino action film directed by Joey del Rosario from a researched story and screenplay by Jojo Lapus. Starring Ramon "Bong" Revilla, Jr., Sheryl Cruz, and Miguel Rodriguez, the film revolves around Adan Ronquillo, a thug born in Cavite and raised in Tondo, vows to take revenge against the killer of his parents after he witnessed their deaths. It also stars Ronaldo Valdez, Dante Rivero, Daniel Fernando, King Gutierrez, and Niño Muhlach.

Produced by Regal Films and released by Star Cinema, the film was theatrically released on May 12, 1993. The film is the initial production venture of Star Cinema, a film production outfit of ABS-CBN Broadcasting Corporation, in collaboration with Regal Films. The film was a "a box-office hit [...] making ABS-CBN the first Philippine media network to venture into movie production and distribution."

== Plot ==
Adan Ronquillo is arrested by his father Pedring for fighting a group of thugs led by Ben Hapon. One night after Adan is set free, his father is murdered by a rogue police force led by Gardo Moreno. Hepe approaches Adan about the incident. Abad kills one of Adan's friends and leaves a message to the Hepe. Adan finds Gardo's son, who is responsible for his father's death, and has been ordered by Gardo to kill the younger Ronquillo; Adan kills him instead. He then sees Gardo in a warehouse, where a member of Gardo's police force opens fire at him. Adan kills most of Gardo's forces using a rifle with a grenade launcher. But Gardo escapes in a car as Adan gives chase in another; they destroy a fuel tanker before Adan shoots Gardo in the back, causing him to skid his car to a stop. Adan then climbs out of his damaged car and kills Gardo, whose car is also blown up. Ben Hapon informs Cesar Moreno of his son Gardo's death, which enrages him.

Adan returns to his house, only to find her mother murdered by Ben Hapon and Karla captured by Cesar. He throws Ben Hapon out of the house, telling the elder Moreno that he is coming for him. Adan goes to Moreno's summer villa in Antipolo to rescue Karla, killing Ben Hapon in the process. Hepe and his police forces arrive to help him and arrest Cesar's men, but the elder Moreno escapes with Karla. During the ensuing scuffle, Cesar slaps Karla, causing her to fall down a hill; he shoots her just as Adan arrives at the scene. Enraged, Adan shoots the elder Moreno with his machine gun and mourns Karla's supposed death as Hepe arrives to help him. However, Cesar is still alive and aims his own machine gun at them. Adan is shot by him before he and Hepe shoot the elder Moreno dead. In a wheelchair while recuperating, Karla survives the scuffle with Cesar and mourns Adan's apparent death in a cemetery with Adan's friend and sister Elma. Hepe then arrives and tells them that Adan also survived, for the younger Ronquillo was only shot in the arm before Cesar was killed.

== Cast ==
- Ramon "Bong" Revilla, Jr. as Adan M. Ronquillo
- Sheryl Cruz as Karla
- Miguel Rodriguez as Capt. Gardo T. Moreno
- Dante Rivero as Sgt. Pedring Ronquillo
- Ronaldo Valdez as Cesar T. Moreno
- Daniel Fernando as Lt. Abad
- Rez Cortez as Paolo
- Niño Muhlach as Bunso
- King Gutierrez as Ben Hapon
- Edgar Mande as Jimboy

== Home media ==
The film was released on VHS in 1994 by Regal Home Video.
