= Temptation Island (1980 film) =

- Directed by: Joey Gosiengfiao
- Written by: Toto Belano
- Produced by: Lily Monteverde
- Starring: Azenith Briones; Jennifer Cortez; Deborah Sun; Bambi Arambulo; Dina Bonnevie; Alfie Anido; Ricky Belmonte; Domingo Sabado; Jonas Sebastian
- Cinematography: Ricardo Jacinto
- Edited by: Rogelio Salvador
- Music by: Jun Latonio
- Distributed by: Regal Films
- Release date: July 4, 1980
- Running time: 115 minutes
- Country: Philippines
- Languages: Filipino; English

Temptation Island is a 1980 Filipino film directed by Joey Gosiengfiao and starring four beauty contest winners: Azenith Briones (Miss Photogenic and 2nd Runner-up, Mutya ng Pilipinas 1975), Jennifer Cortez (Binibining Pilipinas-Universe 1978), Bambi Arambulo (Miss Maja Pilipinas 1977) and Dina Bonnevie (1st Runner-up, Miss Magnolia 1979). Written by Toto Belano, the film is about a group of beauty contest finalists stranded in a desert island without food, water and shelter. It was re-released in 2008 at the Festival Paris Cinéma together with a retrospective on Gosiengfiao.

== Plot ==
The film focuses on four young ladies from different social backgrounds, each of them, for their own various reasons, enlists in the fictional "Miss Manila Sunshine Beauty Pageant".

The first of which is Dina (Bonnevie), a college student who entered the contest in order to earn independence from her family and buy her own car. Next is spoiled, rich socialite, Suzanne (Cortez), whose every whim is attended to by her maid, Maria (Sun), and who learned of the contest when fliers, dropped from a helicopter, interrupted her sunbathing at the family pool. Out of sheer vanity and boredom, she decided to sign up. Thirdly, Bambi (Arambulo), while planning her 18th birthday party, when she and her mother argue over the budget, since her once rich family cannot afford the grand debut, Bambi is forced to settle for a much simpler party. But during their argument, Bambi falls on her birthday cake; when she sees the pageant's TV spot, her frustrations over her current situation inspire her to join. Rounding up the group is Azenith (Briones), a con artist who plans to rig the contest by using her and her boyfriend's sexuality to influence the judges into voting for her.

The ladies later became the finalists for the competition. En route to the evening gown competition, the ship they boarded catches fire, and the passengers scramble to evacuate and be marooned on an island. The four women, Maria, Joshua (the gay pageant coordinator played by Jonas Sebastian) and his boyfriend Ricardo (Ricky Belmonte), Umberto (one of the ship's waiters played by Domingo Sabado) and Alfredo (played by Alfie Anido) land on a desert island.

== Cast ==
- Dina Bonnevie as Dina Espinola
- Azenith Briones as Azenith Tobias
- Jennifer Cortes as Suzanne Reyes
- Bambi Arambulo as Bambi Belisario
- Deborah Sun as Maria
- Ricky Belmonte as Ricardo
- Alfie Anido as Alfredo
- Domingo Sabado as Umberto
- Jonas Sebastian as Joshua Rodriguez
- Tonio Gutierrez as Tonio
- Anita Linda as Nenuca Belisario

== Reception ==
The film has been described as "campy", but it has earned positive responses from several critics. Jessica Zafra calls it a "classic Filipino film [that] dares to expose complex themes..." Boy Abunda has referred to it as a "cult classic." Regal Films, the distributor of the film and its subsequent release on video bills it "Hands-down, most hilarious Filipino film ever made!" Director Petersen Vargas describes the film as both defying and defining studio filmmaking.

The film was also honored at the Ilocos Norte's 2016 Himala sa Buhangin! Art and Music Festival. During the festival, the government of Ilocos Norte unveiled statues of the film's actresses in their iconic poses within the film.

The cult classic film has also been adapted for theater. Directed by renowned theater playwright and director, Chris Martinez, Temptation Island...Live! was a theater adaptation that starred gay actors (John Lapuz and Tuxqs Rutaquio among others) as the beauty queens.

== Filming locations ==
- De La Salle University, Manila
- Araneta Coliseum (now Smart Araneta Coliseum), Quezon City
- Paoay, Ilocos Norte
- Manila International Airport (now Ninoy Aquino International Airport)

== 2011 version ==
In 2011, a new version of Temptation Island was released as a tribute and faithful remake of the 1980 movie. It featured a new batch of cast such as Heart Evangelista, Rufa Mae Quinto, Lovi Poe, Solenn Heussaff and Marian Rivera. It also features Aljur Abrenica, Tom Rodriguez and John Lapus. The new version used Computer Graphic Imaging replacing the analog in the original 1980 movie. Two of the original cast, Deborah Sun and Azenith Briones, are also included in the new movie version.
