= Miguel Rodriguez (actor) =

Filipino actor and model (1962-1997)

- Rodriguez in To Love Again (1983)
- Born: Miguel Benedict P. Rodriguez; November 5, 1962; Las Piñas, Rizal, Philippines
- Died: February 14, 1997 (aged 34); Las Piñas, Metro Manila, Philippines
- Resting place: Alabang, Muntinlupa
- Occupations: Actor, model
- Years active: 1981–1996
- Spouse: Irene Salud (m. 1987)
- Children: 2
- Awards: FAMAS Best Supporting Actor (Ibulong Mo sa Diyos)

Miguel Benedict P. Rodriguez (November 5, 1962 – February 14, 1997) was a Filipino actor and model. He got his start in show business when he was discovered by the filmmaker, a National Artist for Film, Lino Brocka, who cast him in a Close Up commercial in 1981. Often referred to as the "Filipino Christopher Reeve", he was most famous for his roles on the television sitcom Palibhasa Lalake and opposite Sharon Cuneta in the 1983 movie To Love Again.

He was nominated three times—1995, 1989, and 1986 respectively as Best Supporting Actor in the Filipino Academy of Movie Arts and Sciences Awards (also known as the FAMAS Awards) for the films The Elsa Castillo Story (1994), Ibulong Mo sa Diyos (1988), and Partida (1985). He won the award in 1989 for playing the role of Mario Umali—a dance choreographer who raped the main protagonist, Monica Quijano (played by Vilma Santos)—in Ibulong Mo sa Diyos.

== Other works and retirement ==
Rodriguez was also known for having appeared with Snooky Serna in the 1984 film Experience in which he played the character who protected Snooky from a person stalking her. (Note: The said film was directed by Lino Brocka, and written for the screen by another pillar of Philippine film, journalism, and literature, Pete Lacaba.)

Notably, he starred as the Filipino-Spanish Ilustrado, Alfonsito, in the 1985 award-winning and daring period film Virgin Forest directed by the celebrated and multi-awarded Filipino filmmaker, Peque Gallaga, and which musical score was provided by another film icon, Jaime Fabregas.

On June 26, 1986, Rodriguez and Edu Manzano hosted Bb. Pilipinas 1986 Grand Coronation Night, held at the Araneta Coliseum. Ms. Chiqui Hollman-Yulo anchored the event. Seven years later, Miguel and Peque will have worked again in the movie, Adventures of Gary Leon and Kuting.

He eventually became an action film star, appearing in Bir Mammud: Alyas Boy Muslim (1989), Hindi Kita Iiwanang Buhay: Kapitan Paile (1990) and Hanggang Kailan Ka Papatay (1990).

He retired from acting in 1996 after the release of Huwag Mong Isuko ang Laban, the last film he worked on in 1995.

== Personal life and death ==
He married popular fashion stylist and socialite Irene Salud on March 14, 1987, at the Saint Pancratius Chapel, Paco Park, Manila. Actor Fernando Poe Jr. and Lily Monteverde of Regal Films were among their principal sponsors. He had two children: model Sam Rodriguez and a son.

On February 14, 1997, Rodriguez was found dead by household help at his home in BF Homes International, Las Piñas. He had died from pancreatitis at the age of 34.

== Filmography ==
=== Television ===
Year	Title	Role
1986–1991	Vilma!	Co-host
1987–1992	Palibhasa Lalake	Himself
1987–1992	Maricel Regal Drama Special	various roles
1988–1990	Young Love, Sweet Love	various roles
1992–1995	Lovingly Yours, Helen	various roles
1992–1994	Maalaala Mo Kaya	various roles
1993–1994	Pasiklaban sa Trese	Co-host
1994	Ipaglaban Mo: Sa Pagitan ng Dugo at Tubig	various roles
1994	Star Drama Theater Presents: Dawn Zulueta	various roles

=== Film ===
Year	Title	Role
1982	Mainit Na Puso	Rod
1983	To Love Again	Bullet/Alberto Alcantara
1984	Experience	Froilan
1985	Virgin Forest	Alfonsito
1985	Partida	Greggy
1985	I Can't Stop Loving You	Jeff Carbonell
1986	Paalam, Bukas ang Kasal Ko	Ruffy
1986	Payaso	Himself; special participation
1987	Kapag Lumaban ang Api	Ramiro Samonte
1987	Tagos ng Dugo	Cesar Garcia
1987	Stolen Moment	Alex
1987	Paano Kung Wala Ka Na?	Don
1987	Binibining Tsuperman	Christopher
1987	Tatlong Ina, Isang Anak	Nonoy
1988	Ibulong Mo sa Diyos	Mario Umali
1988	Ang Supremo	Lt. Marco Templo
1988	Celestina Sanchez, a.k.a. Bubbles – Enforcer: Ativan Gang	
1989	Bir Mammud, Alyas Boy Muslim	Bir Mammud
1989	Kung Maibabalik Ko Lang	Chito
1989	Bilangin ang Bituin sa Langit	Arturo Zulueta
1989	Si Aida, Si Lorna, o Si Fe	Lando
1990	Pangarap Na Ginto	Jack Peralta
1990	Kahit Isumpa Mo Ako	
1990	Hindi Kita Iiwanang Buhay: Kapitan Paile	Capt. Gabriel Paile
1990	Hanggang Kailan Ka Papatay?	David Llarpido
1991	Adventures of Gary Leon at Kuting	Jude
1992	True Confessions: Evelyn, Myrna & Margie	Rene
1992	Mainit Na Puso	
1992	Lucio Margallo	Alexander Sarmiento
1992	Shotgun Banjo	Marvin
1992	Lacson: Batas ng Navotas	Manuel
1992	Shake, Rattle & Roll IV	Dr. Apol (segment "Ang Madre")
1993	Kung Kailangan Mo Ako	Rocky
1993	Kailan Dalawa ang Mahal?	
1993	Hulihin: Probinsyanong Mandurukot	Brando
1993	Ronquillo: Tubong Cavite, Laking Tondo	Gardo
1993	Jesus Calderon: Maton	Matt
1994	The Elsa Castillo Story: Ang Katotohanan	Ted Boorman
1994	Bala at Lipstick	Tony Boy
1994	Biboy Banal: Pagganti Ko, Tapos Kayo!	Lt. de Vera
1994	Abrakadabra	Santi
1994	The Maggie dela Riva Story: God... Why Me?	Jaime Jose
1995	Saan Ako Nagkamali?	
1995	Di Mapigil ang Init	Eric
1995	Huwag Mong Isuko ang Laban	Captain Ablaza (last film appearance)

== Awards and nominations ==
Year	Award giving body	Category	Nominated work	Results
1986	FAMAS Award	Best Supporting Actor	Partida	Nominated
1989	FAMAS Award	Best Supporting Actor	Ibulong Mo sa Diyos	Won
1995	FAMAS Award	Best Supporting Actor	The Elsa Castillo Story... Ang Katotohanan	Nominated
