= Teodoro Asedillo =

Filipino outlaw and revolutionary (1883–1935)

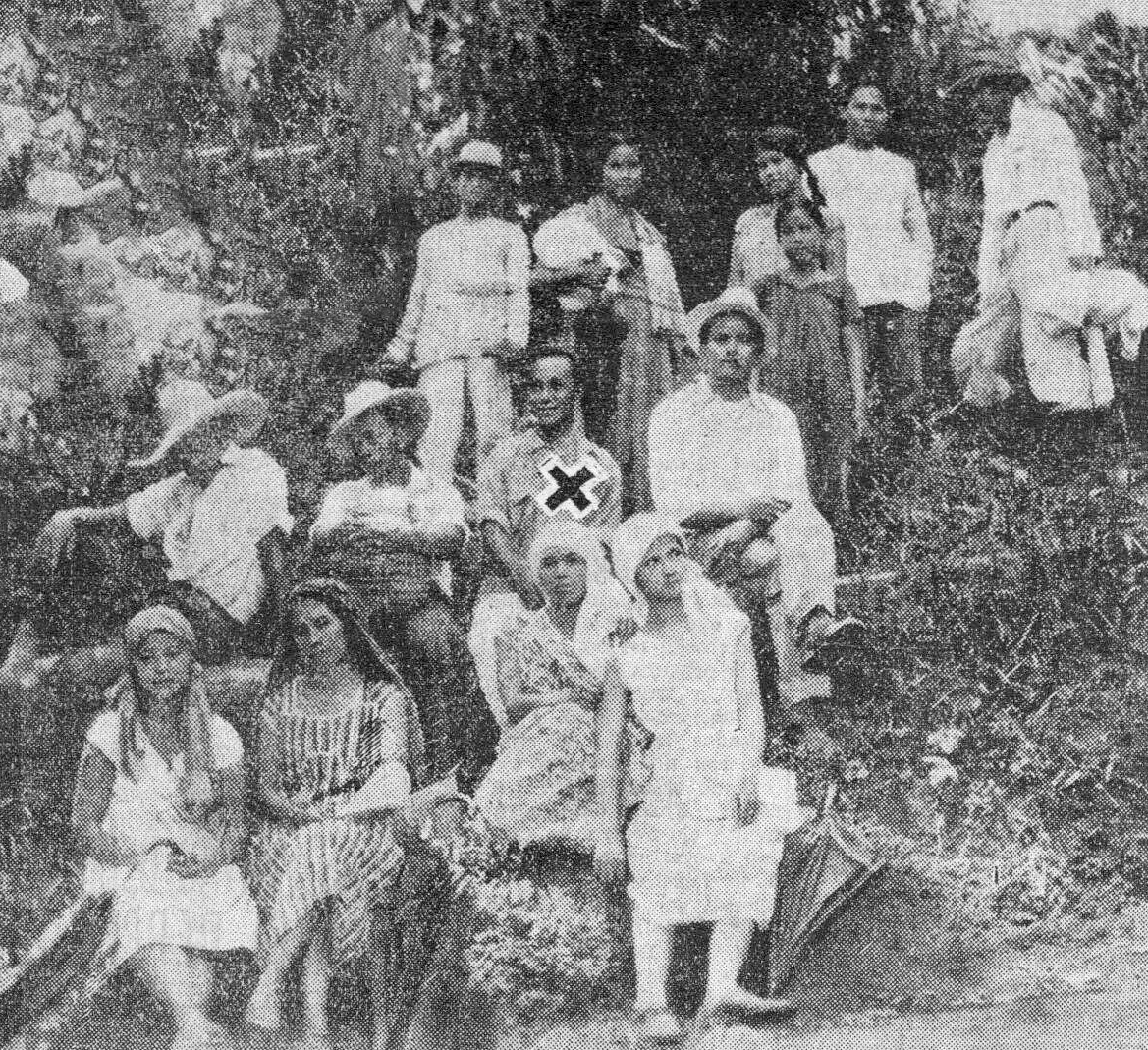
- Teodoro Asedillo (marked by an X) with some of his supporters
- Born: July 1883; Kalayaan, Laguna, Captaincy General of the Philippines
- Died: 31 December 1935 (aged 52); Sampaloc, Tayabas, Philippine Commonwealth
- Resting place: Longos Cemetery, Kalayaan, Laguna
- Other name: Ka Dodo
- Occupations: Schoolteacher; Chief of Police; Unionist
- Organization: Katipunan ng mga Anak-Pawis sa Pilipinas
- Political party: Partido Komunista ng Pilipinas-1930
- Spouse(s): Honorata Oblea; Eustaquia Pacuribot

Teodoro B. Asedillo (July 1883 – 31 December 1935) was a Filipino labor leader and revolutionary. A former schoolteacher and police officer in Longos, he became the head of the labor federation Katipunan ng mga Anak-Pawis sa Pilipinas in his province of Laguna. He was also a member of the Partido Komunista ng Pilipinas-1930.

Asedillo is most famous for leading an armed insurrection against the American colonial government in 1935. Following the failure of a strike in the La Minerva cigarette factory in Tondo, Asedillo returned to Longos and organized armed peasants against what they saw as socio-economic injustice. He became famous as a Robin Hood figure in the area, while colonial officials described him as an outlaw and a bandit leader.

Asedillo was eventually killed in Sampaloc, Quezon, following a manhunt in November 1935. His body was crucified and put on display to discourage supporters.

The Asedillo Falls in Sampaloc are named after him.

== Biography ==
Asedillo was born in July 1883 in Longos (present-day Kalayaan). His father was a councilor of barrio San Antonio. In 1918, Asedillo began teaching at the San Antonio Elementary School, teaching Physical Education. As teacher, he constructed a track and field oval for students. Asedillo opposed American educational policies, including using English as the medium of instruction and using books approved by the Department of Public Instruction. For this, he was charged with insubordination and removed from his post sometime between 1924 and 1925.

Asedillo also had a short stint as police chief in Longos and Paete after becoming a schoolteacher. He was removed after a few years after being accused of embezzling funds from the municipality. He also worked in a tobacco factory and as a worker in a coffee farm.

Asedillo joined the Katipunan ng mga Anak-Pawis sa Pilipinas (KAP) in 1929, eventually becoming its provincial chairperson in Laguna. He also became a member of the Partido Komunista ng Pilipinas-1930. Asedillo was active in organizing KAP in Laguna before he was tasked to go to Manila to organize workers in the La Minerva Cigar and Cigarette Factory in Tondo.

In 1935, La Minerva workers went on strike over low wages and unfavorable working conditions. The strike was violently dispersed by the Philippine Constabulary, killing five workers and wounding eight others, including Asedillo. Constabulary forces attempted to arrest Asedillo, but he resisted and fled to Laguna.

=== Armed rebellion ===
Asedillo began organizing peasants in Laguna and nearby Tayabas under KAP, insisting that peasant demands can only be given through armed struggle. He was also motivated by the Sakdalista uprising of early May 1935 in the Manila area which resulted in 70 deaths and over 1,000 arrests. Asedillo's armed struggle was not supported by the PKP-1930, but was supported by KAP members in Laguna and Party officials and members in province.

He joined up with Nicolas Encallado, a veteran of the Philippine Revolution and the Philippine-American War who fled to the mountains over disputes in his local town. Encallado was known as the "Terror of the Sierra Madre" by the Constabulary and regarded as a bandit and outlaw. He agreed with Asedillo on multiple issues and was convinced of joining him on hearing that KAP fought for independence against the United States.

Asedillo roamed around barrios in Laguna and Tayabas and held meetings to explain the objectives of KAP and recruit fighters. In Cavinti, he would hold his meetings in schools, borrowing chalk from school teachers and taking time to explain the goals of KAP. A Constabulary estimate at the time stated that in Sampaloc, Tayabas, at least 95% of the residents were KAP members.

Asedillo earned renown for his Robin Hood image and vigilante tactics. He and his men were reported to steal carabaos from landlords and break into warehouses to supply themselves with rice. They garnered support for stealing from rich landlords and giving the spoils to poorer peasant farmers. Supporters frequently fed and sheltered them, and it was said that Asedillo could walk the streets of his hometown with no fear of reprisal.

Newspapers at the time described Asedillo and Encallado as bandits. The group was implicated in the murder of Isabelo Bala, a Constabulary informer, and the wounding of four others, on 1 August 1934. Another instance of five missing residents from Longos was attributed to the group, although the Constabulary doubted that they were kidnapped. There was also speculation that some of their members were connected to the Sakdalistas. Others took the opportunity to use Asedillo and Encallado's infamy to their own ends, by falsely attributing crimes or as an intimidation tactic.

A manhunt for Asedillo and Encallado was launched in November 1935 following the death of three municipal officials and multiple Constabulary forces in Longos. The area between Laguna and Tayabas where the men were believed to operate in was declared a war zone, and Constabulary forces forcibly concentrated residents in communities and put under intense surveillance. An informer eventually revealed Asedillo's location in Caldong, Sampaloc to Constabulary troops headed by Lieutenant Jesus Vargas.

Asedillo and his two bodyguards were killed in a shootout on 31 December 1935. Notes found on their bodies alleged that Asedillo and Encallado had plans to raid towns in Laguna and kill informers and Constabulary officers. Asedillo's body was crucified and paraded around nearby towns to discourage sympathy. Encallado surrendered to Constabulary forces in Tayabas two weeks later in January 1936.

== In popular culture ==
Writer and diplomat Leon Ma. Guerrero III referenced both Asedillo and Encallado in his satirical work, "History" - as sometimes written, which was published in Philippine Magazine in March 1936. "History" retells the events of the Philippine Revolution using popular newspaper headlines at the time. Asedillo is portrayed as a mix of Andres Bonifacio and Jose Rizal as the founder of a revolutionary organization called the Anak Pawis and leading a revolutionary struggle before being killed on 31 December 1896 (the same year Rizal was executed). The revolution continued under Encallado's command until he made peace with Governor-General Manuel Quezon in the Pact of Sitio Apugan.

Asedillo was portrayed by Fernando Poe Jr. in the 1971 film Asedillo, directed by Celso Ad. Castillo. The film was shot on location in Sampaloc, where Asedillo operated. A sequel, Ang Anino ni Asedillo, was also filmed in 1988, starring Conrad Poe as somebody who idolizes Asedillo and wishes to be like him.
