= Fernando Poe =

Fernando Poe may refer to:

- Fernando Poe Sr. (1916–1951), Filipino actor
- Fernando Poe Jr. (Ronald Allan Poe; 1939–2004), Filipino actor, film director, and politician
- Andy Poe (Fernando Poe Jr.; 1943–1995), Filipino actor
- Fernando Poe Jr. Avenue (formerly Roosevelt Avenue), a road in Quezon City
- Fernando Poe Jr. station (formerly Roosevelt station), an LRT station

== See also ==
- Fernando Po (disambiguation)
