= Ang Anino ni Asedillo =

1988 Filipino action film starring Conrad Poe

- Directed by: Bert Mendoza; Jose M. Dagumboy
- Screenplay by: Tony Mortel; Bonifacio Paredes
- Starring: Conrad Poe; Dante Rivero; George Estregan; Philip Gamboa; Carlos Salazar; Zandro Zamora; Beverly Vergel; Guia Guizon
- Cinematography: Roger Estrada
- Edited by: Rogelio Salvador
- Music by: Domingo Zafe
- Production company: D'Camp Films International
- Release date: June 1, 1988
- Country: Philippines
- Language: Filipino

Ang Anino ni Asedillo (lit. 'The Shadow of Asedillo') is a 1988 Filipino period action film directed by Bert Mendoza and Jose M. Dagumboy. A sequel to the 1971 biographical film Asedillo, it stars Conrad Poe, Dante Rivero, George Estregan, Philip Gamboa, Carlos Salazar, Zandro Zamora, Beverly Vergel, Guia Guizon, and Farrah Floro; Fernando Poe Jr. is featured in archival footage from the previous film. Produced by D'Camp Films International, the film was released on June 1, 1988. Critic Lav Diaz gave the film a negative review, criticizing its direction, writing, production design, technical qualities, and action scenes.

== Plot ==
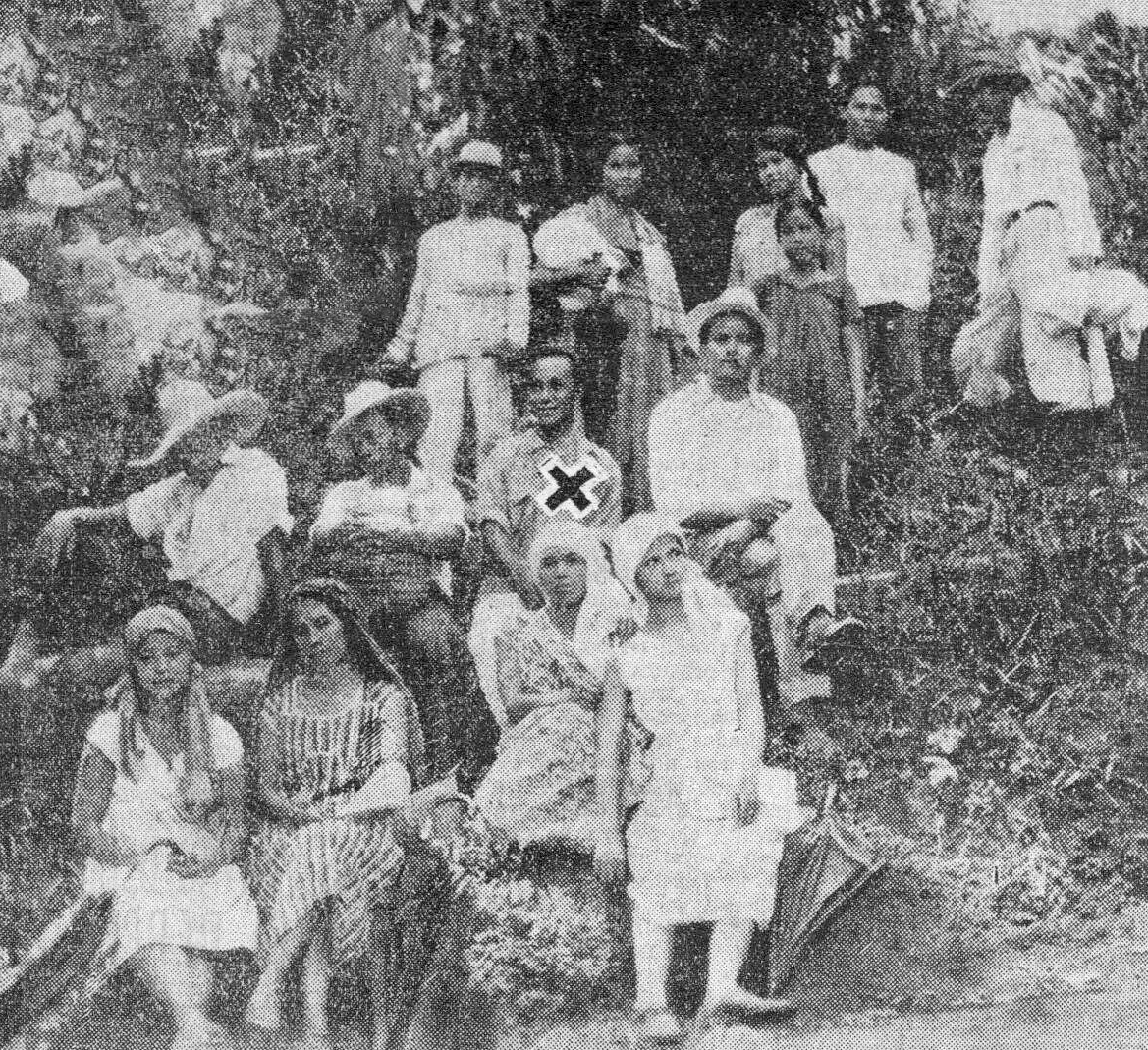
Teodoro Asedillo (marked with X), early 1930's

Simon Crisostomo idolizes Teodoro Asedillo as a kid in the provincial town of San Antonio, wishing to become a righteous teacher like him someday. Fifteen years later, Simon has since become a factory worker in Manila during the Magsaysay administration. When an official from his company rapes and murders his girlfriend, Simon confronts the official and kills him, thus forcing him to return to San Antonio. Upon arrival, he discovers the town's land has been taken over by a greedy don and his henchmen, who have replaced the farmers' crops of rice with sugar cane. Simon then teams up with Alfonso to plan the don's defeat and return the land back to the farmers.

== Cast ==
- Conrad Poe as Simon Crisostomo
- Dante Rivero as Sangre
- George Estregan as Tandang Birong
- Philip Gamboa
- Carlos Salazar
- Zandro Zamora
- Beverly Vergel
- Guia Guizon
- Farrah Floro
- Fernando Poe Jr. as Teodoro Asedillo (archival footage)
- Romy Diaz
- Ruben Rustia
- Nick Romano
- Vic Varrion
- Val Iglesia
- Rey Sagum
- Danny Riel
- Joe Andrade
- Rene Matias
- Rene Romero
- Robert Miller
- Ramon 'Boy' Bagatsing Jr.

== Production ==
The score for Ang Anino ni Asedillo was composed in February 1988.

== Release ==
Ang Anino ni Asedillo was graded "B" by the Movie and Television Review and Classification Board (MTRCB), indicating a "good" quality, and was released in theaters on June 1, 1988.

=== Critical response ===
Lav Diaz, writing for the Manila Standard, gave the film a negative review, criticizing its storytelling for being muddled "from beginning to end" and hampered by poor direction, writing, sound design and lighting, as well as "kenkoy" (transl. silly) action scenes.
