= Longos Church =

Roman Catholic church in Laguna, Philippines

- Saint John the Baptist Parish Church
- Simbahang Pamparokya ni San Juan Bautista (Filipino)
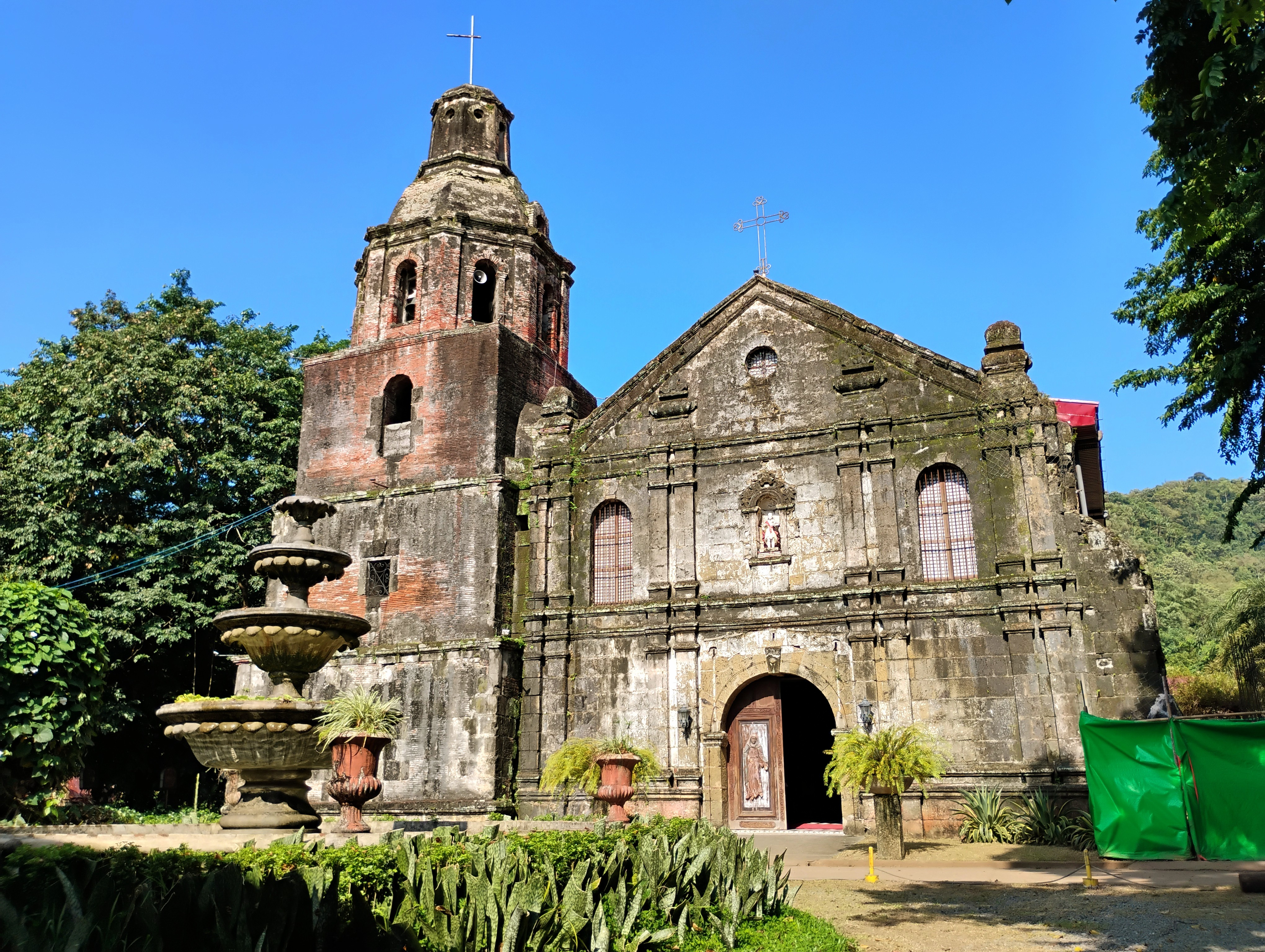
- Church facade in 2025

- Location in Laguna Location in Luzon Location in the Philippines
- 14°20′26″N 121°28′53″E
- Location: Kalayaan, Laguna
- Address: Brgy. Longos
- Country: Philippines
- Denomination: Roman Catholic

History
- Status: Parish church
- Founded: 1577
- Founder: Franciscans
- Dedication: John the Baptist; Nuestra Señora Dela Paz (secondary patron)
- Dedicated: June 2, 1669

Architecture
- Functional status: Active
- Architectural type: Church building
- Style: Baroque
- Years built: ca. 1715

Administration
- District: Ecclesiastical District IV- Vicariate of Our Lady of Guadalupe
- Province: Manila
- Metropolis: Manila
- Archdiocese: Manila
- Diocese: San Pablo
- Deanery: St. James

Clergy
- Priest: Rev. Fr. Christian Edward L. Abao

Saint John the Baptist Parish Church, commonly known as Longos Church, is the oldest Roman Catholic church in the town of Kalayaan in Laguna, Philippines. It is under the jurisdiction of the Diocese of San Pablo and is dedicated to St. John the Baptist, with the fiesta being celebrated every June 24.

== History ==
In 1577, two Franciscan priests—Fray P. San Juan de Placencia and Fray Diego Oropesa—established a church in Lumban in their efforts to Christianize the natives of areas outside Manila. This church had three visitas, one of which is Babaye (now named Longos).

In 1669, a request from native elites to the Franciscans was granted with an order which decreed the creation of the convento of Longos, indicating the establishment of the town. Fray Lucas Sarro was designated as first doctrinero. Several visitas were assigned to this convento.

The adobe and brick church was constructed around 1715. Throughout its history, it has witnessed tumultuous political shifts, jurisdictional changes, and land disputes.

In 1899, Longos was occupied by the Americans in their campaign of Laguna which saw damage to the convent. In 1908, they established the Municipality of Longos.

Executive Order No. 127, s. 1948 transferred the seat of local government from the poblacion of Longos to the Poblacion of San Juan of the same municipality, further decreasing the relevance of the barrio, and in turn its church. In 1956, Republic Act No. 1417 changed the official name from Municipality of Longos to the Municipality of Kalayaan. An earthquake damaged large parts of its convento.

In 1959, the church lost its parish status, which led to 40 years of decay, seeming abandonment and looting of ecclesiastical and precious items.

In 1995, super typhoon Rosing ravaged the Southern Tagalog region of the Philippines, which badly damaged the roof of the church. This destruction was repeated in 2006 when Super Typhoon Milenyo also passed through the area, resulting in further severe damage to the church's roofing.

In 1996, a decree from Bishop Francisco San Diego of the Diocese of San Pablo re-established the church as a parish.

In 2021, the church was included as a Jubilee church in celebration of the 500th anniversary of the arrival of Christianity in the Philippines.

== Architecture and features ==
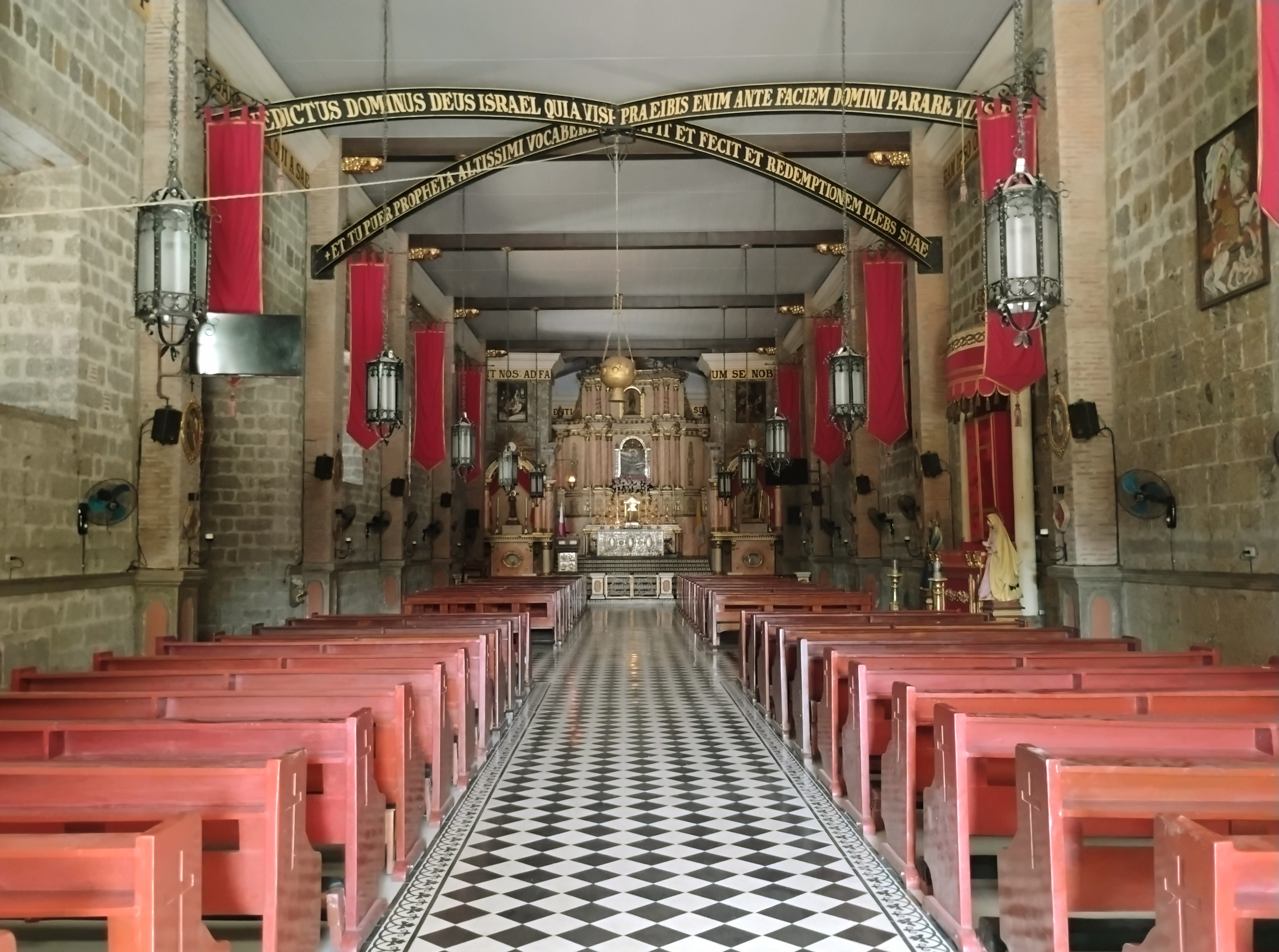
Interior of the church

The adobe and brick structure today was largely built in the early 18th century, around the year 1715, in the Baroque style similar to the many churches built in the Philippines during that time. Ruins of the convent are transformed into a garden and a grotto containing an image of the Our Lady of Lourdes. Its large main door contains the scene of the visitation of Mary to St. Elizabeth.

The main altar is of two tiers, the first layer contains the image Nuestra Señora Dela Paz, the secondary patron of the town; on the other hand, the second layer contains the image of St. John the Baptist. Two side altars are present; the left side altar contains the image and relic of St. Pedro Bautista, one of the priests assigned to the church when it was still a visita. On the right side altar sits an image of St. Joseph, husband of Mary.

Other relics are contained in the church: one are rocks from which the visitacion happened and a relic of St. Philomena.

Paintings associated with Paete artist Jose Luciano Dans adorn its walls. A bas relief of John the Baptist and the Baptism of our Lord are among the most treasured ecclesiastic items.

One of the more unusual features of the church is the Botafumeiro, a swinging thurible hung on large metal arches inscribed with verses from the song of Zechariah.

== Marian devotion ==
In 1694, a supposed miracle surrounding the arrival of the image of the Immaculate Concepcion to the church was documented by the parish priest and the signed by the local members of the principalia who witnessed the event. This manuscript is found in the Archivo Franciscano Ibero Oriental in Madrid, Spain.

The arrival of the image on that faithful day wilted the plants and lost all their leaves around the church patio, particularly the Lucban citruses. The day after, the same Lucban miraculously blossomed at the same time. Another witness claims that they saw deathly ill people be healed after the community prayed to the image.

Furthermore, a parishioner who was attacked and dragged by a crocodile into the Laguna de Bay, prayed to God and the Virgin Mary was claimed to be saved by a mysterious woman who resembles the image that arrived in the church.

The current church devotion to the Virgin Mary is found in their reverence to the Nuestra Señora Dela Paz (arrived 1865), considered to be their secondary patron, with her fiesta being celebrated during May 20. This image is found in the first level of the main altar.

== In popular culture ==
- The interior of the church was seen in a scene in the 1971 film Asedillo.
- The church was a main setting for the 2015 biopic film Felix Manalo.
- The church was a setting for the 2016 television series Ang Panday.
