= Romy Diaz =

Filipino actor (1940-2005)

- Born: José Romeo Bustillos Diaz; November 28, 1940; Pampanga, Philippine Commonwealth
- Died: May 10, 2005 (aged 64); Metro Manila, Philippines
- Resting place: Eternal Gardens Memorial Park, Caloocan, Metro Manila
- Occupation: Actor
- Years active: 1971–2005
- Children: Sieg Diaz
- Relatives: Paquito Diaz (brother); Joko Diaz (nephew); Kiko Estrada (grand nephew)
- Basketball career

Career information
- College: FEU

Career history
- Crispa Redmanizers
- Ysmael Steel Admirals

Romy Diaz (born José Romeo Bustillos Diaz; November 28, 1940 – May 10, 2005), was a Filipino actor, and the younger brother of Paquito Diaz.

He performed in films such as Ang Maestro (1981), The Impossible Kid (1982), Gising Na... Ang Higanteng Natutulog (1995) and Si Samson at Si Delilah (1983). Other notable roles were in films like Kalawang sa Bakal (1987), Don Pepe (1988), Pambato (1993), Tunay na Magkaibigan Peksman (1994) and Jacob C.I.S. (1997).

== Biography ==
Diaz was born on November 28, 1940. His father was a Mexican American of Spanish descent. Diaz was the younger brother of Paquito Diaz and uncle of Joko Diaz, who are both actors.

Prior to his acting career, Diaz played collegiate basketball for the FEU Tamaraws and briefly for the Crispa Redmanizers and the Ysmael Steel Admirals in the 1960s.

Diaz died on May 10, 2005, due to tongue cancer caused by heavy smoking, five months after the death of his longtime friend Fernando Poe Jr.

== Filmography ==
=== Film ===
Year	Title	Role
1971	Buhay Na Manika	
1973	Fight Batman Fight!	
1976	Bato sa Buhangin	Boy Hernandez
1981	Ang Maestro	Ignacio Dela Vega
1982	Anak ng Tulisan	Segundo
1982	The Impossible Kid	
1984	Zigomar	Señor Ricardo Alvarez
1984	Lukas	Banjo Zaragosa
1985	Ben Tumbling: A People's Journal Story	Anor
1986	Iyo ang Tondo, Kanya ang Cavite	
1986	Horsey-Horsey: Tigidig-Tigidig	Damian
1986	Muslim .357	
1986	Asong Gubat	Morales
1986	Payaso	Romy Pocy
1987	Feliciano Luces: Alyas Kumander Toothpick, Mindanao	
1987	Vigilante	Fermin
1987	Black Magic	Satanas
1988	Tubusin Mo ng Dugo	
1988	Rebelyon	
1988	Target... Maganto	Sgt. Dimayuga
1988	Ang Anino ni Asedillo	
1988	Sgt. Ernesto 'Boy' Ybañez: Tirtir Gang	Sgt. Macaroyo
1988	Iyo ang Batas, Akin ang Katarungan	Martin
1988	Jockey T'yan	
1988	Dugo ng Pusakal	
1988	One Two Bato, Three Four Bapor	
1989	Nam Angels	Turko
1989	Sgt. Niñonuevo: The Fastest Gun Alive of WPD	Boy Kulot
1989	Da Best in Da West	Facundo
1989	Ipaglalaban Ko!	
1989	Kailan... Dapat Lumaban	
1989	Black Sheep Baby	
1989	Target... Police General (Maj. Gen. Alfredo S. Lim Story)	
1990	Durugin ng Bala si Peter Torres	
1990	Sgt. Clarin ...Bala para sa Ulo Mo	
1990	Bagwis	
1990	Hindi Ka Na Sisikatan ng Araw: Kapag Puno Na ang Salop Part-III	Dado Maraman
1990	Karapatan Ko ang Pumatay... Kung Kailangan	
1990	Smokey Mountain: Mga Banyaga sa Sariling Lupa	
1990	Tangga & Chos (Beauty Secret Agents)	
1990	Sisingilin Ko ng Dugo	
1990	Iputok Mo... Dadapa Ako! (Hard to Die)	
1990	Kalawang sa Bakal: Hudas sa Lupa	
1990	Espadang Patpat	
1991	Anak ni Baby Ama	Larry
1991	Katabi Ko'y Mamaw	Blacky
1991	Valentin Zapanta: Alyas Ninong – Huling Kilabot ng Tondo	Kadyo
1991	Robin Good: Sugod ng Sugod	Haring Caiaphas
1991	Okay Ka, Fairy Ko!: The Movie	Contreras
1992	The Return of Long Ranger & Tonton: How the West Was Wrong	
1992	Magnong Rehas	
1992	Tough Guys: Mga Batang Walong Gatang	
1992	Totoy Buang: Mad Killer ng Maynila	Boy's father
1992	Lakay	
1992	Ano Ba 'Yan?	Danny Apog
1992	Pacifico Guevarra: Dillinger ng Dose Pares	
1993	Patapon	Rico
1993	Angelfist	Mexican drug dealer
1993	Manila Boy	Ragoy
1993	Humanda Ka Mayor!: Bahala Na ang Diyos	Miong
1993	Mancao	Ka George
1994	Once Upon a Time in Manila	Mario
1994	Lagalag: The Eddie Fernandez Story	Kits
1994	Epimaco Velasco: NBI	Stepfather
1994	Ang Pagbabalik ni Pedro Penduko	Paniki
1995	Epifanio ang Bilas Ko: NB-Eye	Ben
1995	Gising Na ang Higanteng Natutulog	Mulong
1995	Ang Syota Kong Balikbayan	Johnny
1996	Kristo	Satan
1996	Maginoong Barumbado: Kung May Halaga Pa ang Buhay Mo	Turko
1996	Lab en Kisses	Aga
1996	Ang Probinsyano	Ben
1996	Aringkingking: Ang Bodyguard Kong Sexy	Thalio
1997	Cobra	Gaspar
1997	Mauna Ka, Susunod Ako!	Kardong Katay
1997	Tekkie	
1999	D' Sisters: Nuns of the Above	Señor Pacheco
1999	Ako'y Ibigin Mo... Lalaking Matapang	Tonio
1999	Suspek	
2000	Sgt. Carlito Nuñez: Kahit Demonyo Itutumba Ko	Juancho
2000	Ang Dalubhasa	Adyong Tulak
2000	Kahit Demonyo Itutumba Ko	Chinese man
2001	Hindi Sisiw ang Kalaban Mo	Col. Altares
2002	Walang Iwanan, Peksman	Oscar
2002	Sa Harap ng Panganib	Gemmo
2002	Ang Alamat ng Lawin	Leandro
2005	Enterpool: S.C.I.A., Senior Citizen in Action	Final film appearance

=== Television ===
- Yagit (1983–1985) as Chito
