= Gising Na ang Higanteng Natutulog =

Philippine action film

- Directed by: Arturo San Agustin
- Screenplay by: Senen Dimaguila; Joe Ranay
- Story by: Siegfried Diaz; Arturo San Agustin
- Produced by: Atilemrac
- Starring: Andy Poe
- Cinematography: Ricardo Remias
- Edited by: Jess Aning; Tony Sy
- Music by: Edwin Ortega
- Production company: ATB-4 Films
- Distributed by: ATB-4 Films
- Release date: June 21, 1995
- Running time: 110 minutes
- Country: Philippines
- Language: Filipino

Gising Na ang Higanteng Natutulog (lit. The Sleeping Giant is Awake) is a 1995 Philippine action film co-written and directed by Arturo San Agustin. The film stars Andy Poe in the title role. It was one of the entries in the 1995 Manila Film Festival.

== Plot ==
Delfin Guerrero (Andy) retires from being a policeman after being fed up with the corruption in his department and returns to his hometown where he runs for chairman of his barrio.

== Cast ==
- Andy Poe as Delfin Guerrero
- Romy Diaz as Mulong
- Bob Soler as Mayor Sales
- Star as Kaibigan
- Glenda Garcia as Laura
- Berting Labra as Teban
- Rhey Roldan as Mayor Sales' Aide
- Ernie David as Mayor Sales' Aide
- Erwin Montes as Delfin's Brother
- Nonong Talbo as Cong. Abad
- Banjo Romero as Cong. Abad's Son
- Christian San Agustin as Delfin's Son
- Lovely Mansueto as Delfin's Daughter
- Danny Riel as Johnny
- Vic Varrion as Maj. Martin

Guest cast

- Rudy Fernandez as Capt. Ortega
- Lito Lapid as Lt. Escobar

== Production ==
Andy Poe died on May 20, days after principal photography was completed. His brother Ronnie dubbed parts of the film during post-production.

== Awards ==
Year	Awards	Category	Recipient	Result	Ref.
1995	5th Manila Film Festival	Lingap ng Inang Maynila Award	Gising Na ang Higanteng Natutulog	Won	
