= Kamay ni Cain =

1957 Filipino film directed by Gerardo de Leon

- Theatrical film poster featuring FPJ
- Directed by: Gerardo de León
- Written by: Cesar J. Amigo; Clodualdo del Mundo Sr.
- Based on: Kamay ni Cain by Clodualdo del Mundo Sr. and Fred Carillo
- Produced by: Cirio H. Santiago
- Starring: Zaldy Zshornack; Fernando Poe Jr.
- Edited by: Gervacio Santos
- Music by: Ariston Avelino
- Production companies: People's Pictures, Inc.
- Release date: June 13, 1957
- Country: Philippines
- Language: Filipino

Kamay ni Cain (transl. Hand of Cain) is a 1957 action film directed by Gerardo de León, written by Cesar Amigo and Clodualdo del Mundo Sr., starring Zaldy Zshornack and Fernando Poe, Jr.

== Cast ==
- Zaldy Zshornack as Eduardo
- Fernando Poe, Jr. as Ernesto
- Edna Luna
- Leonor Vergara

== Awards and nominations ==
Award-Giving Body	Category	Recipient	Result	Source
1958 FAMAS Awards
1958 FAMAS Awards	Best Picture	Kamay ni Cain	Nominated	
1958 FAMAS Awards	Best Supporting Actress	Leonor Vergara	Nominated	
1958 FAMAS Awards	Best Supporting Actor	Fernando Poe Jr.	Nominated	
