= Walang Daigdig =

1960 Filipino film directed by Pablo Santiago

- Directed by: Pablo P. Santiago
- Screenplay by: Tommy C. David
- Story by: Jose Miranda Cruz
- Produced by: Larry Santiago
- Starring: Fernando Poe Jr.; Zaldy Zshornack; Cielito Legaspi; Ben Perez; Rodolfo Cristobal
- Music by: Tito Arévalo
- Production companies: Larry Santiago Productions; Poe-Zshornack Productions
- Release date: January 7, 1960
- Country: Philippines
- Language: Filipino

Walang Daigdig (No World) is a 1960 action film directed by Pablo Santiago and written by Tommy C. David. It stars Fernando Poe Jr., Zaldy Zshornack, Cielito Legaspi, Ben Perez, Rodolfo Cristobal. This film marks the first venture of lead star Fernando Poe Jr. and Zaldy Zshornack as film producers.

== Cast ==
- Fernando Poe Jr.
- Zaldy Zshornack
- Cielito Legaspi
- Ben Perez
- Rodolfo Cristobal
- Ramon Revilla
- Oscar Keese
- Loretta De Lara
- Nello Nayo
- Aida Villegas
- Paquito Diaz
- Elvira Reyes
- Dely Atay-Atayan
- Francisco Cruz
- Johnny Long
- Boy Soriano
- Tony Montes
- Delly Villanueva
- Alex de Long
- Bino Garcia
- Dencio Padilla
- Armando Araneta
- Vicente Santiago
- Violeta Mayo
- Terry Gonzales

== Accolades ==
Year	Award-giving body	Category	Name	Results
1961	FAMAS Awards	Best Actor	Fernando Poe Jr.	Nominated
