= Manila Boy =

- Theatrical poster
- Directed by: Arturo San Agustin
- Written by: Eddie Joson
- Starring: Robin Padilla
- Cinematography: Danny Bustos; Ricardo Herrera; Ben Lobo; Joe Tutanes
- Edited by: Edgardo "Boy" Vinarao
- Music by: Magnum "Jun" Garlan
- Production company: Pioneer Films
- Distributed by: Pioneer Films
- Release date: September 22, 1993
- Running time: 119 minutes
- Country: Philippines
- Language: Filipino
- Budget: ₱55 million

Manila Boy is a 1993 Filipino action film directed by Arturo San Agustin. The film stars Robin Padilla in the title role.

The film is streaming online on YouTube.

== Plot ==
This is a story about Diego (Robin Padilla), a wacky provincial man from Zambales. He gets to find a job and ends up working to Manila for Mang Berto (Berting Labra) and finding Mang Berto's long time friend Sibuboy (Val Iglesia) the two met Diego and thanked him for helping him and he willingly worked with Sibuboy as his business partner. Suddenly Mang Berto escapes when the cops captured Diego and Sibuboy as a gun runners. Then Ragoy (Romy Diaz) and his men prepared to release Diego and Sibuboy out of jail and they ended up working for a millionaire kingpin Señor Escudero (Tony Ferrer) as their big boss and they get involved with his enemies and drug smuggling, sex trafficking, hoodlum in roads, and illegal gambling for Señor Escudero's businesses with Gonzalo (Paquito Diaz) who takes care of Señor Escudero's businesses. Diego gets an alias and becomes the hitman named Manila Boy.

== Cast ==
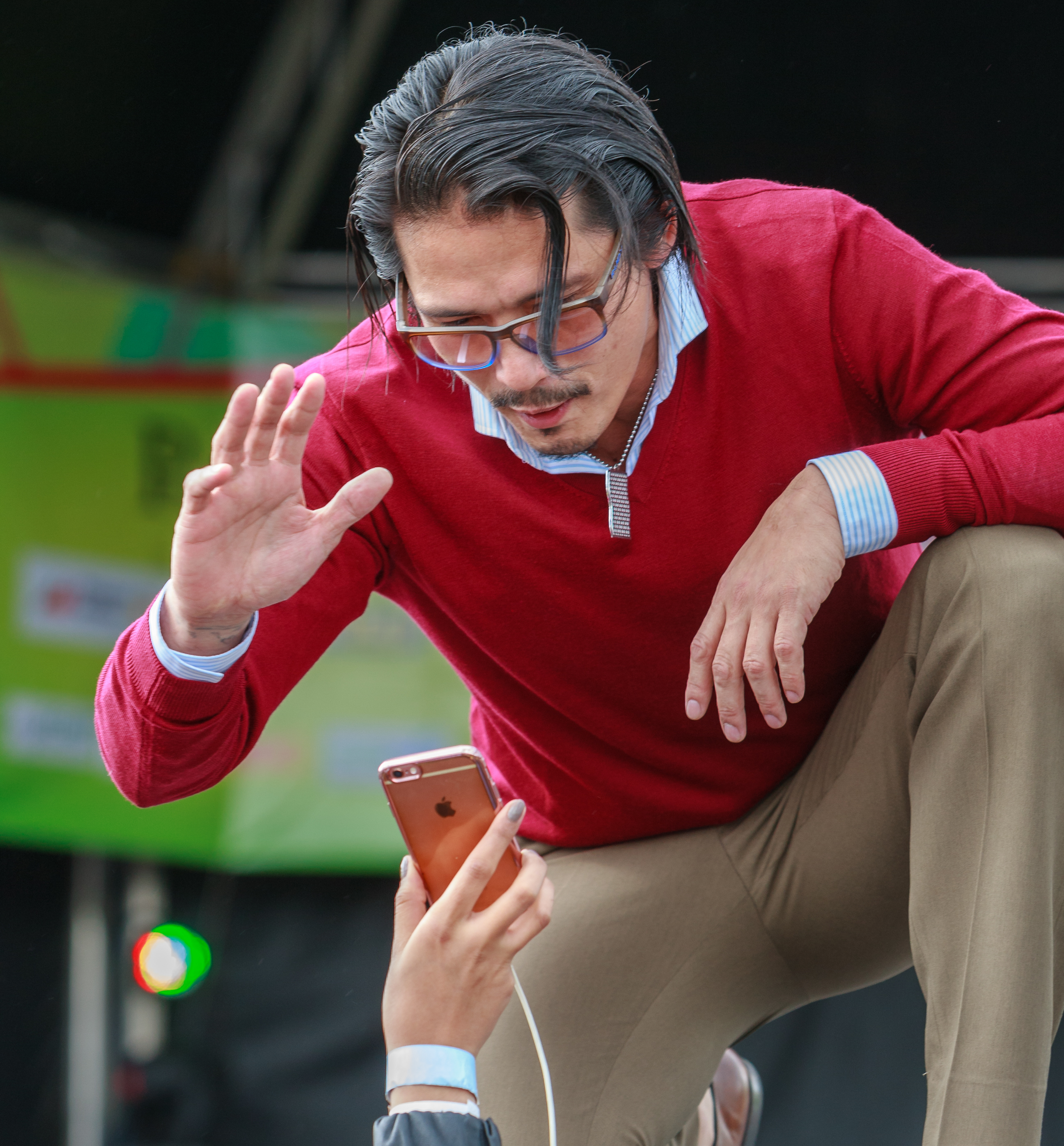
Robin Padilla portrays Diego/Manila Boy.

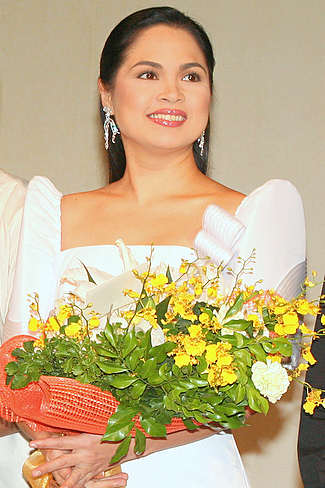
Judy Ann Santos portrays Neneng.

- Robin Padilla as Diego/Manila Boy
- Tony Ferrer as Señor Escudero
- Aurora Sevilla as Anita
- Judy Ann Santos as Neneng
- Berting Labra as Mang Berto
- Vanessa Escaño as Vanessa
- Norman Lucena as Jake
- Gilda Aragon as Minda
- Fred Panopio as Tiyo Pedong
- Ben Dato as Barangay Chairman
- Jenny Roa as Señor Escudero's secretary
- Andy Poe as Maj. Castro
- Paquito Diaz as Gonzalo
- Romy Diaz as Ragoy
- Max Alvarado as Turko
- Val Iglesias as Sibuboy (as Val Iglesia)
- Flora Cristobal as Aling Flora
- Conrad Poe as Alvarez
- Lovely Rivero as Turko's hitwoman
- Rommel Padilla as Señor Escudero's henchmen no. 1
- June Hidalgo as Señor Escudero's henchmen no. 2 (as Jun Hidlago)
- Cesar Iglesias as Señor Escudero's henchmen no. 3 (as Cesar Iglesia)
- Danny Riel as Señor Escudero's henchmen no. 4
- Jim Rosales as Señor Escudero's henchmen no. 5
- July Hidalgo as Ragoy's henchmen no. 1
- Jorge Estregan as Ragoy's henchmen no. 2
- Renato del Prado as Alvarez's henchmen no. 1
- Tony Bernal as Alvarez's henchmen no. 2
- Robert Miller as Alvarez's henchmen no. 3
- Bomber Moran as Turko's henchmen no. 1
- Nonong de Andres as Turko's henchmen no. 2
- Rey Solo as Turko's henchmen no. 3
- Bobby Oreo as Turko's henchmen no. 4
- Bebeng Amora as Turko's henchmen no. 5
- King Gutierrez as Gambling syndicate leader
- Zandro Zamora as Police officer no. 1
- Rene Matias as Police officer no. 2
- Ernie David as Erning Barako
- Tony Bagyo as Erning Barako's Inmate

== Disqualification ==
The film was disqualified from showing in Metro Manila cinemas in 1993, as the board of governors, which comprised the mayors of Metro Manila, made the decision. In particular, the mayor of Manila at the time, Alfredo Lim, was concerned about the violent, lawless image of a "Manila Boy" being promoted by the movie. The mayor not only dropped the movie from the annual festival but also threatened to ban the film from being shown in the city of Manila. To circumvent the ban, the producers agreed to drop "Manila" from the title and released the movie as simply "Boy".
