= Kalayaan, Laguna =

Municipality in Laguna, Philippines

Kalayaan Longos
- Municipality
- Municipality of Kalayaan
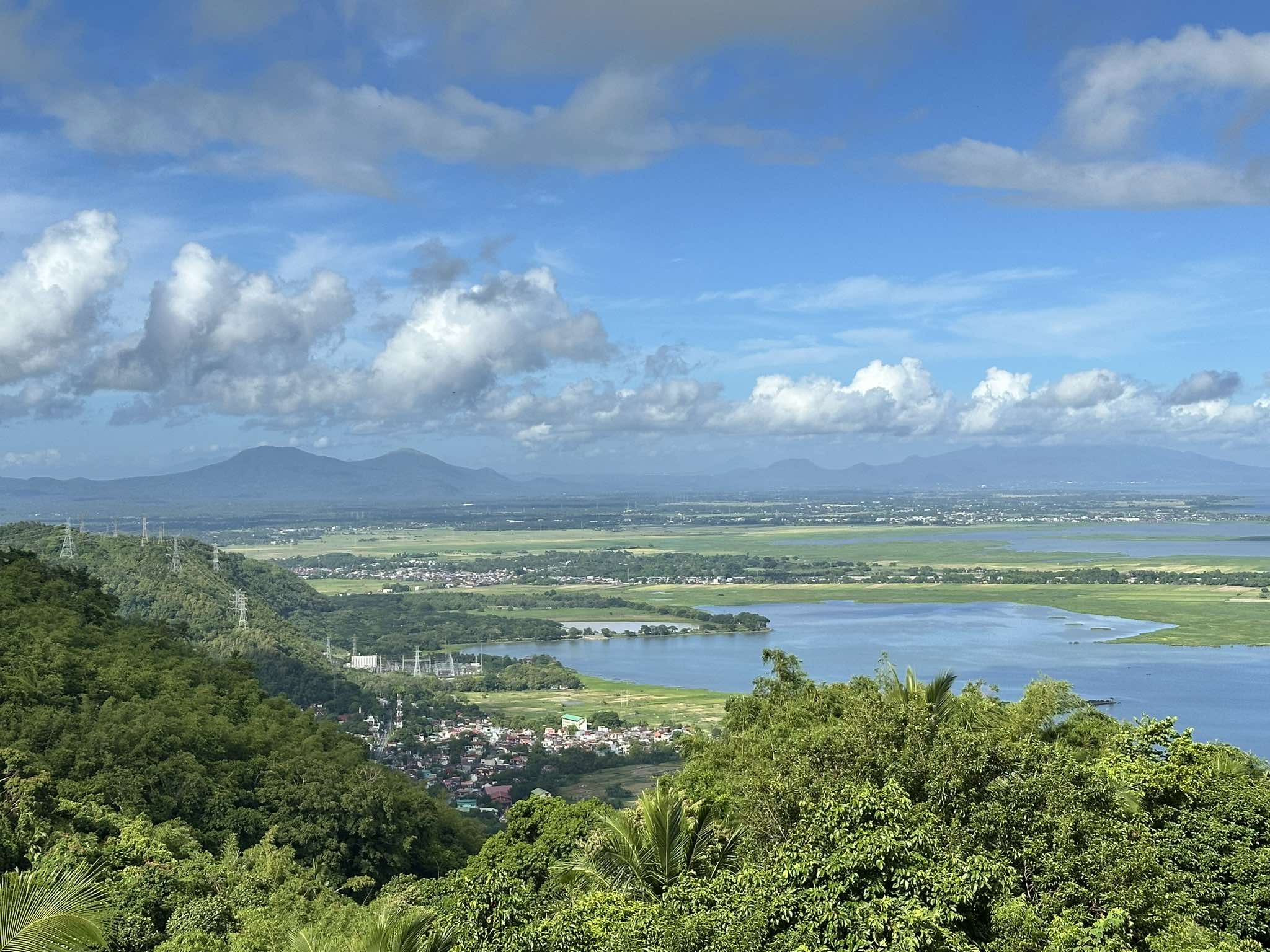
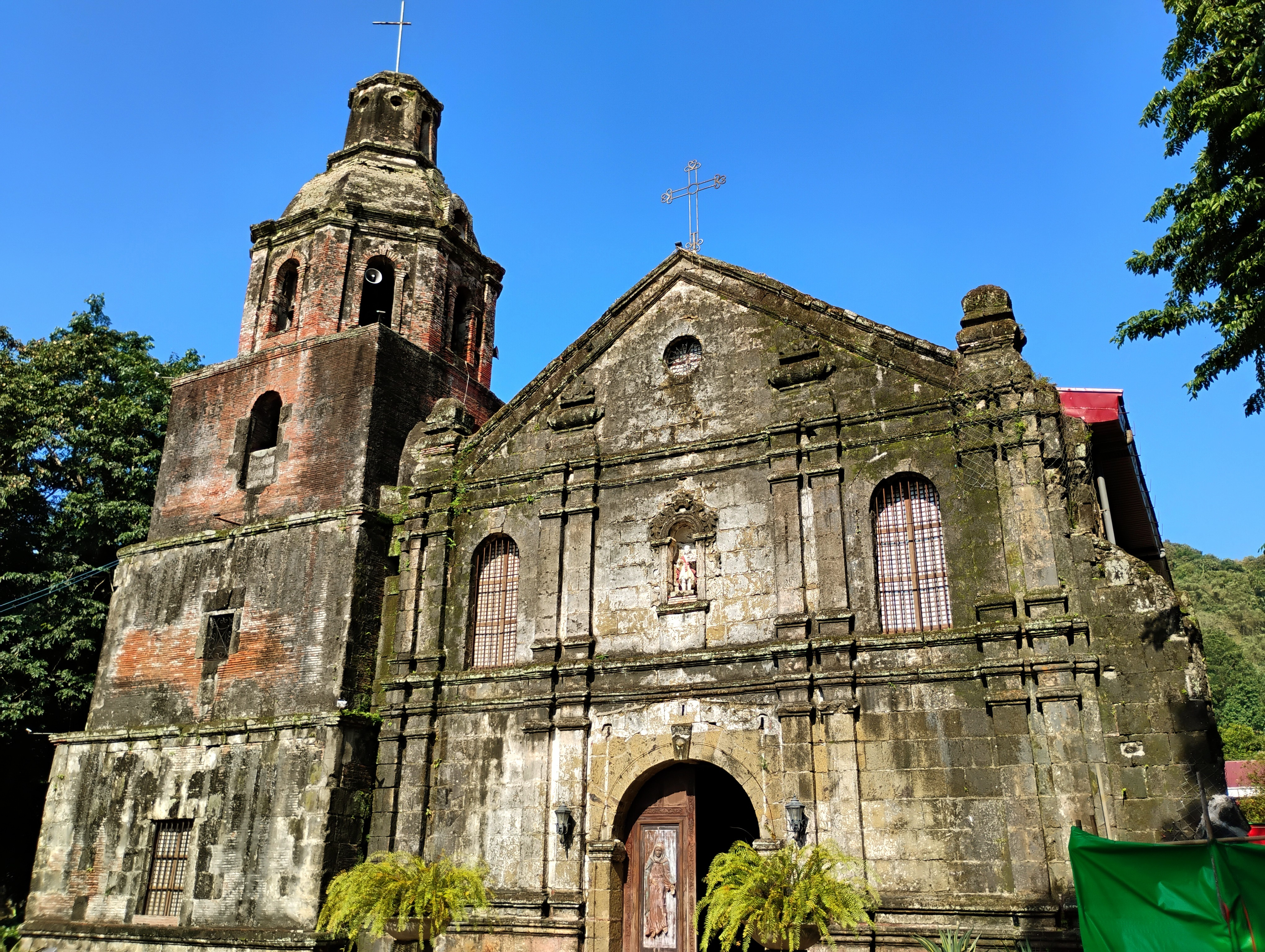
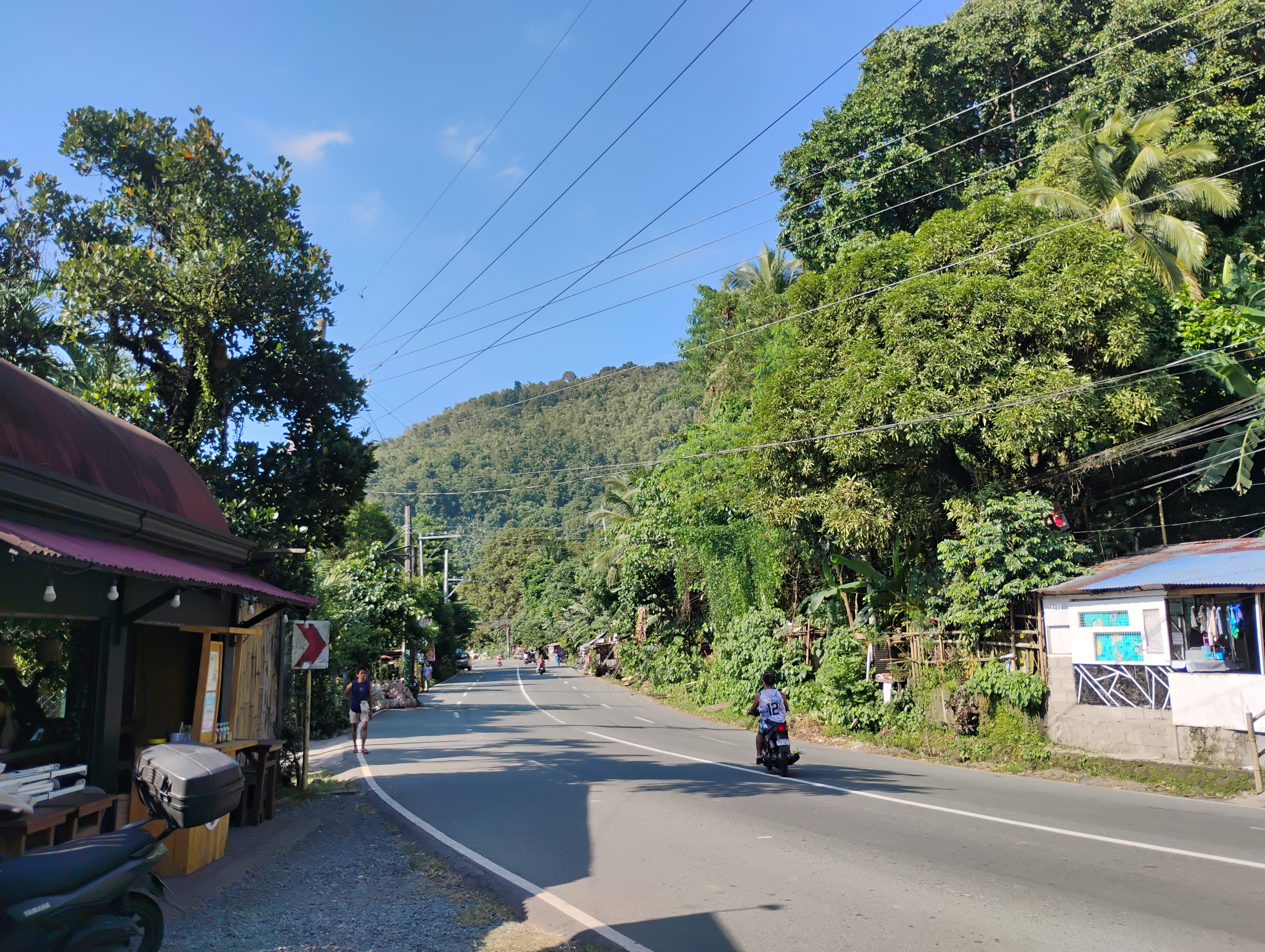
- View of Barangay San Juan and Laguna de Bay Saint John the Baptist Church of Longos Kalayaan National Highway

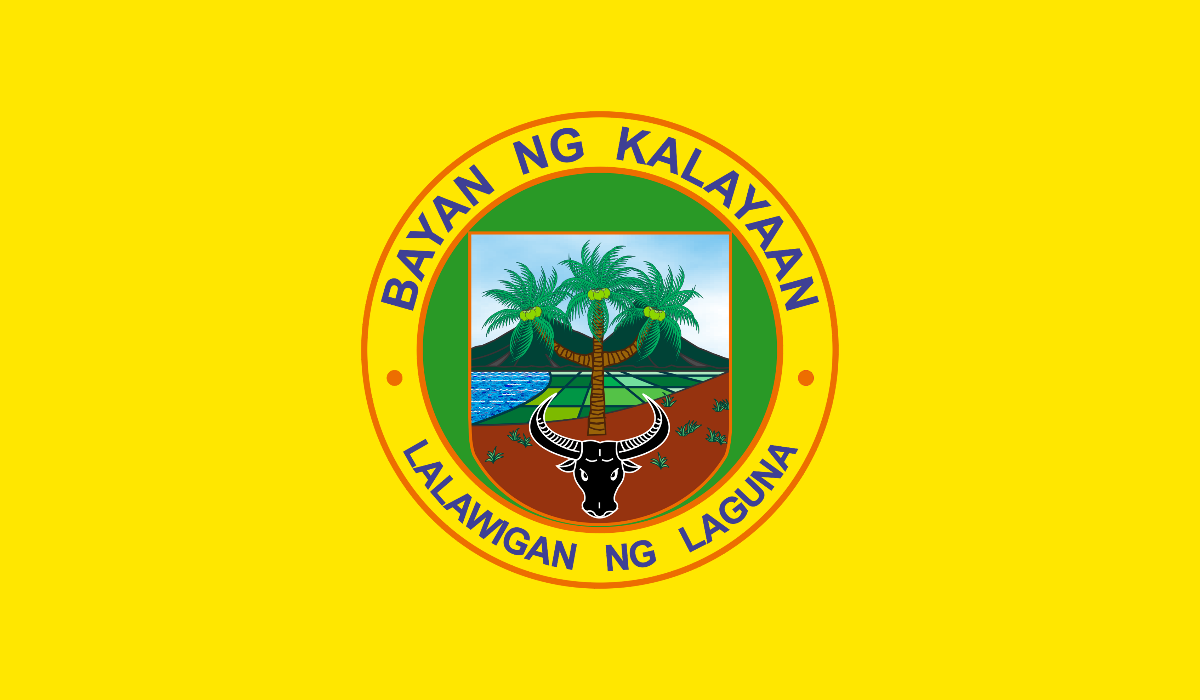
- Flag Seal
- Nickname: Laguna's Symbol of Peace and Unity
- Map of Laguna with Kalayaan highlighted
- Interactive map of Kalayaan
- Location within the Philippines
- Coordinates: 14°19′41″N 121°28′48″E
- Country: Philippines
- Region: Calabarzon
- Province: Laguna
- District: 4th district
- Founded: January 1, 1909 (as Longos)
- Barangays: 3 (see Barangays)

Government
  - Type: Sangguniang Bayan
  - Mayor: Sandy P. Laganapan
  - Vice Mayor: Christopher P. Ramiro
  - Representative: Benjamin C. Agarao Jr.
  - Municipal Council: Members: Darwin R. Ponce; Beverly D. Reyes; Giana Maria R. Cagandahan; Melody A. Adao; Marian F. Erufino; Edison A. Flores; Rodel S. Yapana; Laarni C. Lopez
  - Electorate: 17,165 voters (2025)

Area
  - Total: 46.60 km^{2} (17.99 sq mi)
- Elevation: 286 m (938 ft)
- Highest elevation: 536 m (1,759 ft)
- Lowest elevation: 1 m (3.3 ft)

Population (2024 census)
  - Total: 25,243
  - Density: 541.7/km^{2} (1,403/sq mi)
  - Households: 5,790

Economy
  - Income class: 3rd municipal income class
  - Poverty incidence: 28.1% (2023)
  - Revenue: ₱ 159.1 million (2024)
  - Assets: ₱ 282.8 million (2024)
  - Expenditure: ₱ 60.8 million (2024)
  - Liabilities: ₱ 64.91 million (2024)

Service provider
  - Electricity: First Laguna Electric Cooperative (FLECO)
- Time zone: UTC+8 (PST)
- ZIP code: 4015
- PSGC: 0403409000
- IDD : area code: +63 (0)49
- Native languages: Tagalog
- Patron saint: John the Baptist
- Website: www.kalayaanlaguna.gov.ph

Kalayaan, officially the Municipality of Kalayaan (Tagalog: Bayan ng Kalayaan), is a municipality in the province of Laguna, Philippines. According to the 2024 census, it has a population of 25,243 people.

== Etymology ==
The municipality was formerly called Longos until 1956 when it was changed to its present name.

== History ==
An inscription displayed at the municipal building of Kalayaan reads: “On this site once stood a coconut tree with three branches, which our forebears interpreted as marking the future location of the municipal building; the three branches representing San Juan, Longos, and San Antonio.”

Today, the belief had been realized but digging through historical records, it seems that the place is still made up of the three original visitas of Babaye (now Longos), Abacao (now San Juan) and San Pablo (now San Antonio). Babaye got its name when the Spaniards came and found women washing clothes in the brook. When the Spaniards continued their aim to conquer the land and a little north of Babaye, they saw a place where people dried abaca and named the place Abacao. The Spaniards claimed the mountains east of Babaye and named the village found there in honor of San Pablo.

On March 30, 1946, Executive Order No. 127 which ordered the transfer of the seat of government from Longos to San Juan was signed by Pres. Manuel Roxas. From then on, a part of San Juan became the Poblacion, while Longos, San Antonio and the rest of San Juan became its barangays.

== Geography ==
The municipality of Kalayaan is located approximately 14º20’ to 14°22’ latitude and 121º28’ to 121º38’ longitude. It is bounded by Paete on the north, Lumban on the south, Laguna de Bay on the west, and Mauban, Quezon on the east. The municipality is 11 kilometres (6.8 mi) from the provincial capital Santa Cruz, 98 kilometres (61 mi) from Manila, and 59 kilometres (37 mi) from Lucena. It could be reached via the Manila South Expressway and an artery of the national road southward from Calamba and northward from Pagsanjan.

Kalayaan is roughly rectangular in shape, with a hilly terrain on most of its eastern side, while relatively flat on its western side. Its highest elevations are from 400 to 418 metres. These are found in Sitio Santo Angel, Malaking Pulo, and Cabuhayan in Barangay San Juan, and Sitio Lamao in Barangay San Antonio. Approximately three fourths of the total land area are with terrain 300 metres above sea level. Its lowest points are from 5 to 20 metres along the western sections of Barangays San Juan and Longos towards Laguna de Bay.

=== Barangays ===
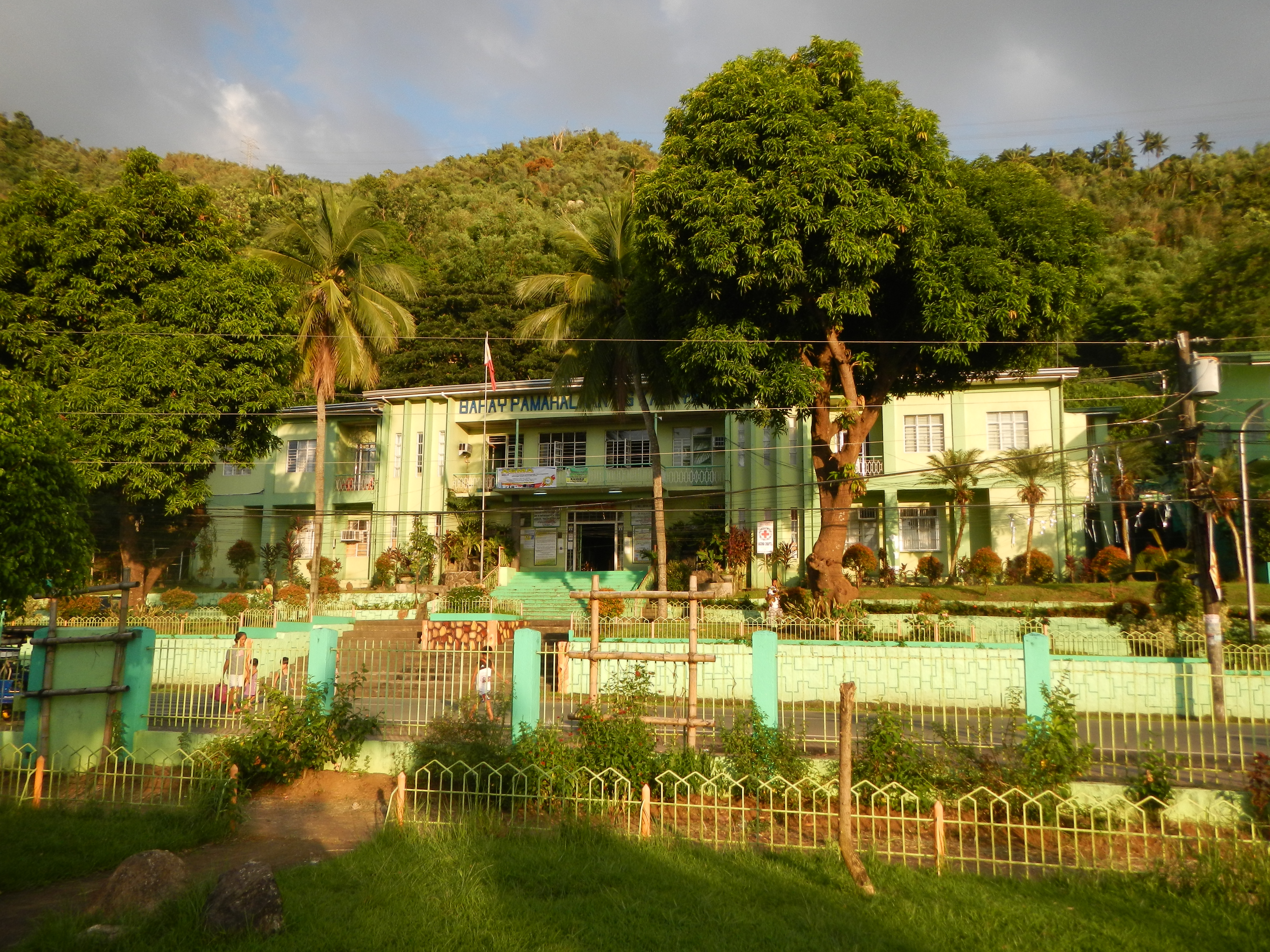
Kalayaan town hall

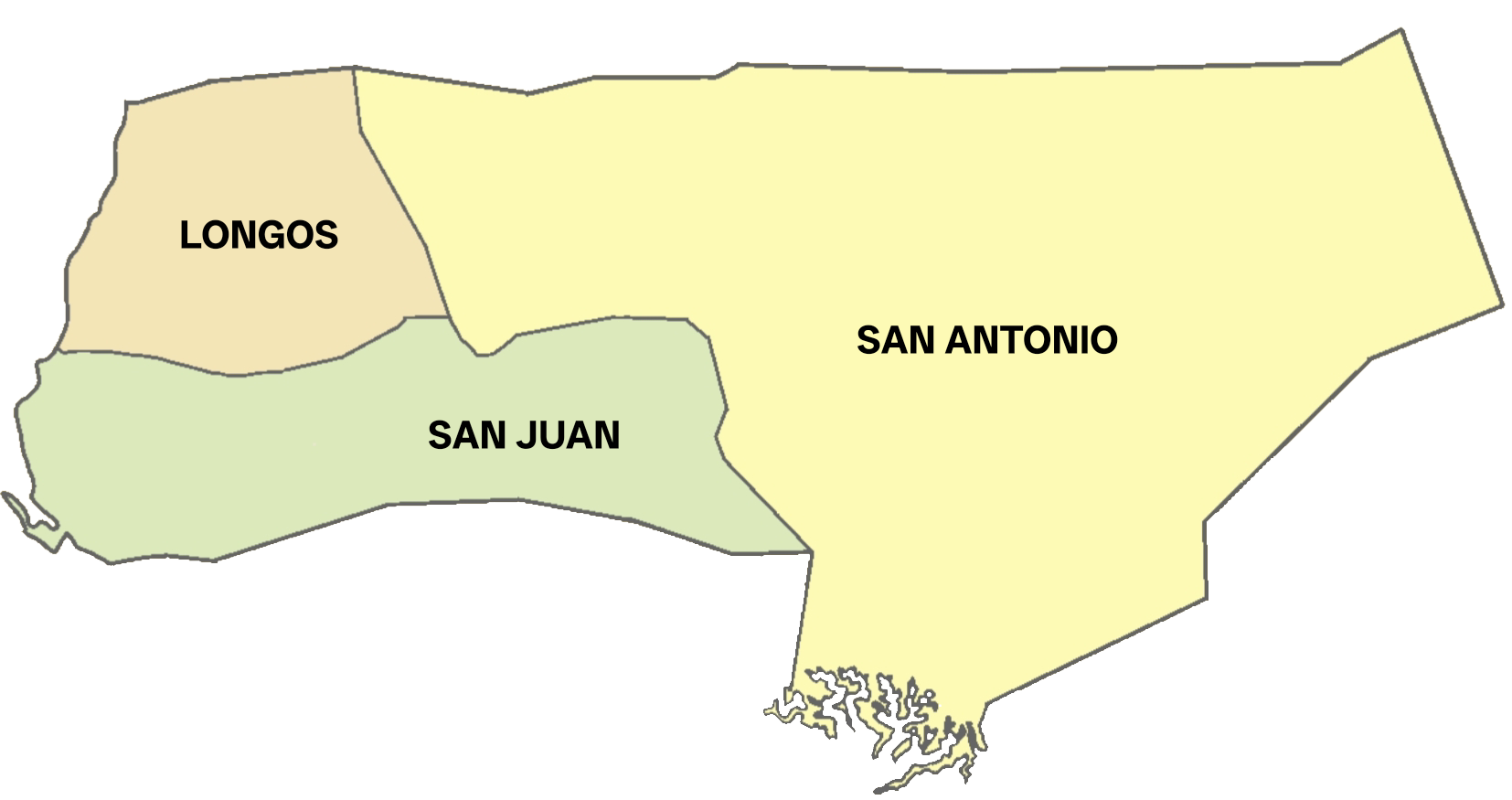
Barangay map of Kalayaan

Kalayaan is politically subdivided into 3 barangays, as indicated below and in the image herein. Each barangay consists of puroks and some have sitios.

- Longos (old capital town)
- San Antonio
- San Juan

=== Climate ===
Climate data for Kalayaan, Laguna
Month	Jan	Feb	Mar	Apr	May	Jun	Jul	Aug	Sep	Oct	Nov	Dec	Year
Mean daily maximum °C (°F)	24 (75)	25 (77)	26 (79)	29 (84)	29 (84)	28 (82)	27 (81)	27 (81)	27 (81)	26 (79)	25 (77)	24 (75)	26 (80)
Mean daily minimum °C (°F)	20 (68)	20 (68)	20 (68)	21 (70)	22 (72)	22 (72)	22 (72)	22 (72)	22 (72)	21 (70)	21 (70)	20 (68)	21 (70)
Average precipitation mm (inches)	58 (2.3)	41 (1.6)	32 (1.3)	29 (1.1)	91 (3.6)	143 (5.6)	181 (7.1)	162 (6.4)	172 (6.8)	164 (6.5)	113 (4.4)	121 (4.8)	1,307 (51.5)
Average rainy days	13.4	9.3	9.1	9.8	19.1	22.9	26.6	24.9	25.0	21.4	16.5	16.5	214.5
Source: Meteoblue

== Demographics ==
Population census of Kalayaan
Year	Pop.	±% p.a.
1903	2,435	—
1918	3,103	+1.63%
1939	3,519	+0.60%
1948	3,817	+0.91%
1960	5,007	+2.29%
1970	6,957	+3.34%
1975	8,501	+4.10%
1980	10,247	+3.81%
1990	13,118	+2.50%
1995	16,955	+4.92%
2000	19,580	+3.13%
2007	21,203	+1.10%
2010	20,944	−0.45%
2015	23,269	+2.03%
2020	24,755	+1.31%
2024	25,243	+0.47%
Source: Philippine Statistics Authority

In the 2024 census, the population of Kalayaan, was 25,243 people, with a density of 540 inhabitants per square kilometre or 1,400 inhabitants per square mile.

== Economy ==
Poverty incidence of Kalayaan (%)

Source: Philippine Statistics Authority

== Energy ==
The municipality is home to a hydroelectric power plant, the only pumped storage facility in the Philippines, the Kalayaan Pumped Storage Power Plant located in Brgy. San Juan, that contributes substantially to the income and an economic activity that is anchored on agriculture. It has complied with Ecological Solid Waste Management Act of 2000 (R.A. 9003) by constructing a Category-I Sanitary Landfill under LISCOP, considered one of its kind on the municipal level in the Province of Laguna, which aims to put into practice the segregation and proper disposal of solid waste for the protection of environment.

== Government ==
Kalayaan belongs to the fourth district of the province of Laguna.

== Education ==
The Lumban-Kalayaan Schools District Office governs all educational institutions within the municipality. It oversees the management and operations of all private and public, from primary to secondary schools.

=== Primary and elementary schools ===
- Longos Elementary School
- San Antonio Elementary School
- San Juan Central School
- Sitio Kalayaan Elementary School
- Sitio Lunao Elementary School
- Sitio Magalolon Elementary School
- Sitio Pulot/Bay Elementary School

=== Secondary schools ===
- Barangay Longos Senior High School
- Liceo de San Antonio
- San Juan National High School
- San Antonio Integrated National High School

== Religion ==
Longos Church, officially known as St. John The Baptist Parish Church, is located in the town. Built in 1669, it has also been used as the setting for various films and television series such as Asedillo, starring Fernando Poe Jr. in 1971, and the 2016 television series Ang Panday starring Richard Gutierrez.

== See also ==
- List of renamed cities and municipalities in the Philippines
