= Fernando Po =

Fernando Po may refer to:

- Fernando Po, an island in Equatorial Guinea, now called Bioko
- Fernão do Pó, Portuguese explorer
- Fernando Pó, a village in Palmela, Portugal
- Fernando Pó halt, a railway halt in Palmela, Portugal

== See also ==
- Fernando Poe (disambiguation)
