= Muslim .357 =

1986 Filipino film directed by Ronwaldo Reyes

- Theatrical release poster
- Directed by: Ronwaldo Reyes
- Screenplay by: Fred Navarro
- Story by: Alfred M. Sunga
- Produced by: Atty. Espiridion D. Laxa
- Starring: Fernando Poe Jr.
- Cinematography: Ver P. Reyes
- Edited by: Augusto Salvador
- Music by: Ernani Cuenco
- Production company: EDL Productions
- Distributed by: EDL Productions
- Release date: July 31, 1986
- Running time: 107 minutes
- Country: Philippines
- Language: Filipino

Muslim .357 (or Magnum Muslim .357) is a 1986 Philippine action film directed by and starring Fernando Poe Jr. as an undercover officer of the Philippine Constabulary. The film was both a box-office and critical success, earning nominations from various award giving bodies in the Philippines, twice winning the Best Actor award for Poe's performance. This, along with Poe's earlier portrayal of a Muslim hero in Zamboanga (1966), endeared Poe even more to Muslim audiences who are known to be passionate about the outcome of Poe's movies story-wise.

== Plot ==
A massive criminal syndicate with its members disguised as policemen is operating on the streets of Manila. To crack down on the syndicate, Police Lieutenant Colonel Luis Castro, has First Lieutenant Jamal Razul, a Muslim police officer based in Mindanao, reassigned to Manila. Razul settles into an apartment located in a rough neighborhood controlled by the syndicate, but hides his identity from the community. Meanwhile, the police have false intelligence spread out, hinting that Jamal is a wanted murderer. However, his landlady, Dess, develops a relationship with Jamal after reading his copy of the Koran and witnessing him beat up syndicate members who routinely extort her and her neighbors.

Jamal and an undercover policeman, Sergeant Bulusan, try to infiltrate a syndicate hideout. Jamal spies Frankie, the syndicate's second-in-command, directing deals involving drugs and guns. However, Jamal is found out, and Bulusan is killed during the escape. Injured, Jamal evades the syndicate with the help of two boys, Kikoy and Buknoy, who hide him in their cart. With the help of Dess, Jamal recovers at the house of the boys' guardian, Imo. Later on, Kikoy and Buknoy find and play with Jamal's Smith and Wesson Model 19, leading to an accidental discharge. After giving the boys a lecture on gun safety, Jamal also grows close to them.

However, Jamal's identity is soon leaked by a spy in the police. A group of syndicate henchmen disguised as police tries to kill Jamal at his apartment, but Jamal fights them off. As the apartment is declared a crime scene, another police officer, Captain Rios - the man who had Jamal's identity leaked - arrives. Rios discreetly kills a wounded syndicate member to silence him.

The next day, Frankie lures Jamal to a bar and leaves him to be killed by his henchmen. Despite having his gun confiscated, Jamal uses a hidden dagger to kill most of the men who were supposed to kill him before being rescued by Colonel Castro. Due to his cover being blown, Jamal is ordered to return home. As he leaves Manila, Jamal meets with Kikoy and Bunkoy to say goodbye. However, Frankie's men try to ambush Jamal one last time. He escapes, but the boys are killed in the crossfire. After their funeral, Jamal visits their graves and vows revenge.

Jamal then goes rogue and gradually wipes out the syndicate's top men, including the man who killed the Kikoy and Bunkoy. Captain Rios then leads a manhunt to capture Jamal, but the latter escapes. Jamal then manages to kidnap Frankie and forces him to reveal the syndicate's headquarters. Alarmed at the deaths of his men, the syndicate's leader Jimmy, panics and harangues Rios. Wanting to take power for himself, Rios kills Jimmy and takes over the syndicate.

Arriving at the syndicate headquarters, Jamal discovers Rios leading the group, but Frankie escapes and alerts the syndicate to Jamal's presence. Rios tries to flee, but Jamal shoots his car, causing it to blow up. A shootout ensues, leading to Jamal killing off multiple syndicate members, including Frankie. Eventually, the police arrive to arrest the remaining syndicate members.

A wounded Rios, having survived his car's explosion, tries to escape. Jamal catches him in an alley and offers him a chance to surrender. However, a remaining syndicate member distracts Jamal long enough for Rios to try to shoot Jamal. Both men are wounded by stray bullets, causing Rios to launch an Islamophobic rant. Jamal then refutes Rios before shooting him dead and fleeing. The film ends with Jamal praying at a mosque.

== Cast ==
- Fernando Poe Jr. as 1st Lt. Jamal Razul
- Eddie Garcia as Capt. Rios
- Vivian Foz as Dess
- Paquito Diaz as Frankie
- Eddie Arenas as Sgt. Alex Suarez
- Max Alvarado as Imo
- Romy Diaz
- Vic Diaz
- Ruel Vernal as Bert
- Jimmy Fabregas as Jimmy
- Renato del Prado
- Lt. Col. Luis T. Castro as himself
- Rey Langit as Sgt. Bulusan
- Christopher Paloma as Kikoy
- Michael Roberts as Buknoy

== Remake ==
The film was remade in 2014 under the title Muslim Magnum .357: To Serve and Protect with E.R. Ejercito in the title role and Francis "Jun" Posadas as the director. The remake was an official entry into the 2014 Metro Manila Film Festival and was dedicated to the memory of Fernando Poe Jr. which coincides with Poe's 10th death anniversary.

== Accolades ==
Year	Award-Giving Body	Category	Recipient	Result
1987
1987	FAMAS Awards			
1987	FAMAS Awards	Best Actor	Fernando Poe Jr.	Won
1987	FAMAS Awards	Best Picture	Magnum Muslim .357	Nominated
1987	FAMAS Awards	Best Director	Ronwaldo Reyes	Nominated
1987	FAMAS Awards	Best Supporting Actor	Paquito Diaz	Nominated
1987	Luna Awards	Best Actor	Fernando Poe Jr.	Won
