= Zaldy Zshornack =

Filipino actor

- Born: Jose Rizaldy Taduran Zshornack; 30 December 1937; Manila, Commonwealth of the Philippines
- Died: 18 November 2002 (aged 64); Muntinlupa, Philippines
- Occupation: Actor
- Years active: 1952–1997
- Known for: Pipoy
- Spouse: Shirley Gorospe (m. 1960; died 2002)
- Children: 2

José Rizaldy Taduran Zshornack (30 December 1937 – 18 November 2002) was a Filipino actor. Zshornack had a long career spanning the 1950s to the 1990s.

His name Zaldy is derived from his birthdate, 30 December, which is celebrated as Rizal Day in the Philippines, in honor of its national hero.

== Personal life ==
He was of Filipino, German, Polish, and Spanish descent. He was married to former Filipino American beauty queen Shirley Gorospe and together they had two children.

Zshornack grew up in Caloocan. He went to Cecilio Apostol Elementary School and briefly attended Manila Central University prior to being discovered by Doña Adela H., vda de Santiago of Premiere Productions.

== Death ==
In 1990, Zshornack moved back to the Philippines from the United States where he resided since the early 1970s.

He died on 18 November 2002, aged 64, from complications resulting from adult onset diabetes.

== Filmography ==
=== Film ===
- 1952: Malolos
- 1956: Lo' Waist Gang
- 1956: Montalan Brothers
- 1957: Libre Comida
- 1957: Barumbado
- 1957: Ukulele Boy
- 1957: Kamay ni Cain
- 1957: Bicol Express
- 1957: Los Lacuacheros
- 1957: Yaya Maria
- 1957: Sweethearts
- 1957: Pusakal
- 1957: Kamay ni Cain
- 1957: Tokyo 1960
- 1957: Bakya Mo Neneng
- 1958: Batang Piyer
- 1958: Fighting Tisoy
- 1958: Man on the Run
- 1958: Shirley, My Darling
- 1958: Obra-Maestra
- 1958: You're My Everything
- 1958: Anak ng Lasengga
- 1958: Wanted: Husband
- 1960: Walang Daigdig
- 1990: Kaaway ng Batas
- 1992: Aguila at Guerrero
- 1996: Labanang Lalaki
