= Labanang Lalaki =

Philippine action film

- Directed by: Joe Mari Avellana
- Written by: Joe Mari Avellana
- Produced by: Ernesto C. Rojas
- Starring: Jestoni Alarcon; John Regala; Zaldy Zshornack
- Cinematography: Ricardo Remias
- Edited by: Edgardo Vinarao
- Music by: Lamberto Avellana Jr.
- Production company: Premiere Entertainment Productions
- Distributed by: Premiere Entertainment Productions
- Release date: October 30, 1996
- Running time: 110 minutes
- Country: Philippines
- Language: Filipino

Labanang Lalaki is a 1996 Philippine action film written and directed by Joe Mari Avellana. The film stars Jestoni Alarcon, John Regala and Zaldy Zshornack.

== Cast ==
- Jestoni Alarcon as Carding de Vera
- John Regala as Rex Robledo
- Zaldy Zshornack as Mayor Leon Severo
- Jennifer Mendoza as Anna Monteclaro
- Sheila Ysrael as Prising de Vera
- Dindo Arroyo as Pingas
- Bing Davao as Gardo
- Bennette Ignacio as Jun-jun
- Eric Francisco as Duduo
- Ernie David as Dagul
- Robert Miller as Karyas
- Allan Garcia as Gabaldon
- Enrico Villa as Tata Peles
- Ding Salvador as Bogart
- Pilar de Leon as Nana Biring
- Joe Jardi as Mayor's Bodyguard
- Rey Ebdane as Mayor's Bodyguard
- Alex Toledo as Mayor's Bodyguard
- Roger Dantes as Badong
- Denver Razon as Elvis
