= Andy Poe =

Filipino actor

- Born: Fernando Kelley Poe Jr. May 4, 1943; City of Greater Manila, Commonwealth of the Philippines
- Died: May 20, 1995 (aged 52); Quezon City, Philippines
- Resting place: Manila North Cemetery
- Other name: Andy
- Occupation: Actor
- Years active: 1965–1995
- Known for: The real "Fernando Poe Jr."
- Spouse: Yvette Christine de Marcaida (m. 1980)
- Children: 2
- Parents: Fernando Poe Sr. (father); Elizabeth G. Kelley (mother)
- Family: Ronald Allan (FPJ) (brother); Conrad Poe (half-brother); Grace Poe (niece); Lovi Poe (niece)

Fernando Kelley Poe Jr. (May 4, 1943 – May 20, 1995), professionally known as Andy Poe, was a Filipino actor. He was a brother of Philippine action movie king Fernando Poe Jr.

== Early life and career ==
He was born Fernando Kelley Poe Jr. on May 4, 1943, son of Filipino actor Fernando Poe Sr. and Irish American mestiza wife Elizabeth "Bessie" Kelley. His siblings were Elizabeth ("Liza"), Genevieve, Evangeline, Ronald Allan ("Ronnie") and Freddie; and half-brother of Conrad Poe.

Poe studied at the San Beda College in Mendiola, Manila from his elementary years up to his sophomore high school years. He transferred to the José Rizal College for junior and senior high school. He enrolled at the University of the Philippines to study architecture. After college, he pursued a career in the movies like his older brother Ronnie. Because his name was used by Ronnie professionally ("Fernando Poe Jr."), he opted to use his nickname "Andy" as his professional name.

== Marriage ==
In 1979, he met 20-year-old, Yvette Christine de Marcaida who was the leading lady of his brother FPJ in "Ang Lihim Ng Guadalupe" which was the entry of FPJ Productions in the 1979 Metro Manila Film Festival. Yvette descended from the Portuguese-Indian Barrettos of the Philippines and distantly related to the Barrettos based in Zambales. Poe and de Marcaida got married in Matinez County, California, on July 31, 1980. They had two sons, Fernando Poe IV ("Donnie") and Alexander Vaughn Poe ("Lex") in 1981 and 1983 respectively.

From 1982 to 1984, Poe and his wife Yvette de Marcaida established DAY FILMS and produced three movies namely: Pamilya Dimagiba, Brando Bandido, and Magtago Ka Na Sa Pinanggalingan Mo. In 1985, Poe and his family immigrated to the United States and resided in Jersey City, New Jersey, until 1993 where the couple became active in the real estate business as realtors with Century 21. Poe returned to the Philippines in 1993 and did several movies until his sudden demise in 1995.

== Filmography ==
=== Film ===
- Magtago Ka Na sa Pinangalingan Mo (1965)
- Dobol Trobol (1966)
- Alamat ng 7 Kilabot (1967)
- El Niño (1968) as El Niño
- Jingy (1968) as Jingy
- Dos por Dos (1968)
- Brothers for Hire (1968)
- Isa para sa Lahat, Lahat para sa Isa (1979)
- Pepeng Kulisap (1979)
- Darna at Ding (1980)
- Lacson, Batas ng Navotas (1992) as Andy
- Manila Boy (1993) as Maj. Zaragosa
- Ronquillo: Tubong Cavite, Laking Tondo (1993) as Hepe
- Tumbasan Mo ng Buhay (1993) as Valdez
- Nandito Ako (1993) as Col. Borromeo
- Megamol (1994) as Elias
- Lagalag: The Eddie Fernandez Story (1994)
- Gising Na ang Higanteng Natutulog (1995) as Delfin Guerrero
- Bukas, Bibitayin si Itay (1995)
- Rodolfo "Boy" Fuentes: Libingan ng Mga Buhay (1995)

== Death ==
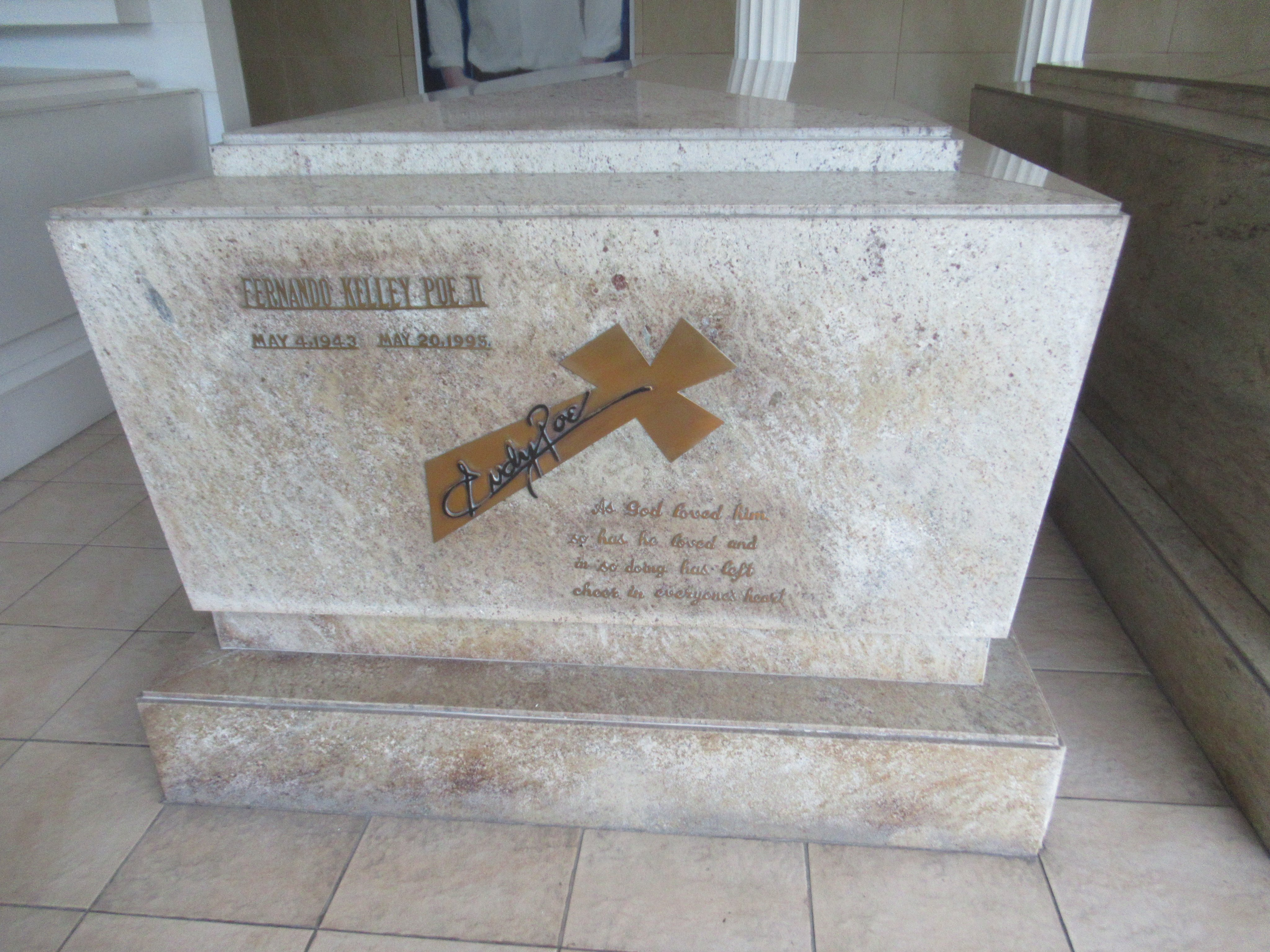
Poe's grave at the Manila North Cemetery

Poe died of a heart attack on May 20, 1995, only two weeks after his 52nd birthday. He was buried at his family's mausoleum at the Manila North Cemetery.
