= Conrad Poe =

Filipino actor

- Born: Conrad Castro Poe; April 11, 1948; Manila, Philippines
- Died: June 26, 2010 (aged 62); Meycauayan, Bulacan, Philippines
- Other name: C.P.
- Occupation: Actor
- Years active: 1966–2009
- Spouse: Zenaida Marcelo
- Parents: Fernando Poe Sr. (father); Patricia Mijares (mother)
- Relatives: Fernando Poe Jr. (brother); Andy Poe (brother); Grace Poe (niece); Lovi Poe (niece)

Conrad Castro Poe (April 11, 1948 – June 26, 2010) was a Filipino actor, and half-brother of Fernando Poe Jr.

== Early life ==
He was born on April 11, 1948, to Fernando Poe Sr. and former leading lady Patricia Mijares. He was a paternal half-brother to Elizabeth Poe, Fernando Poe Jr., Andy Poe, and Freddie Poe.

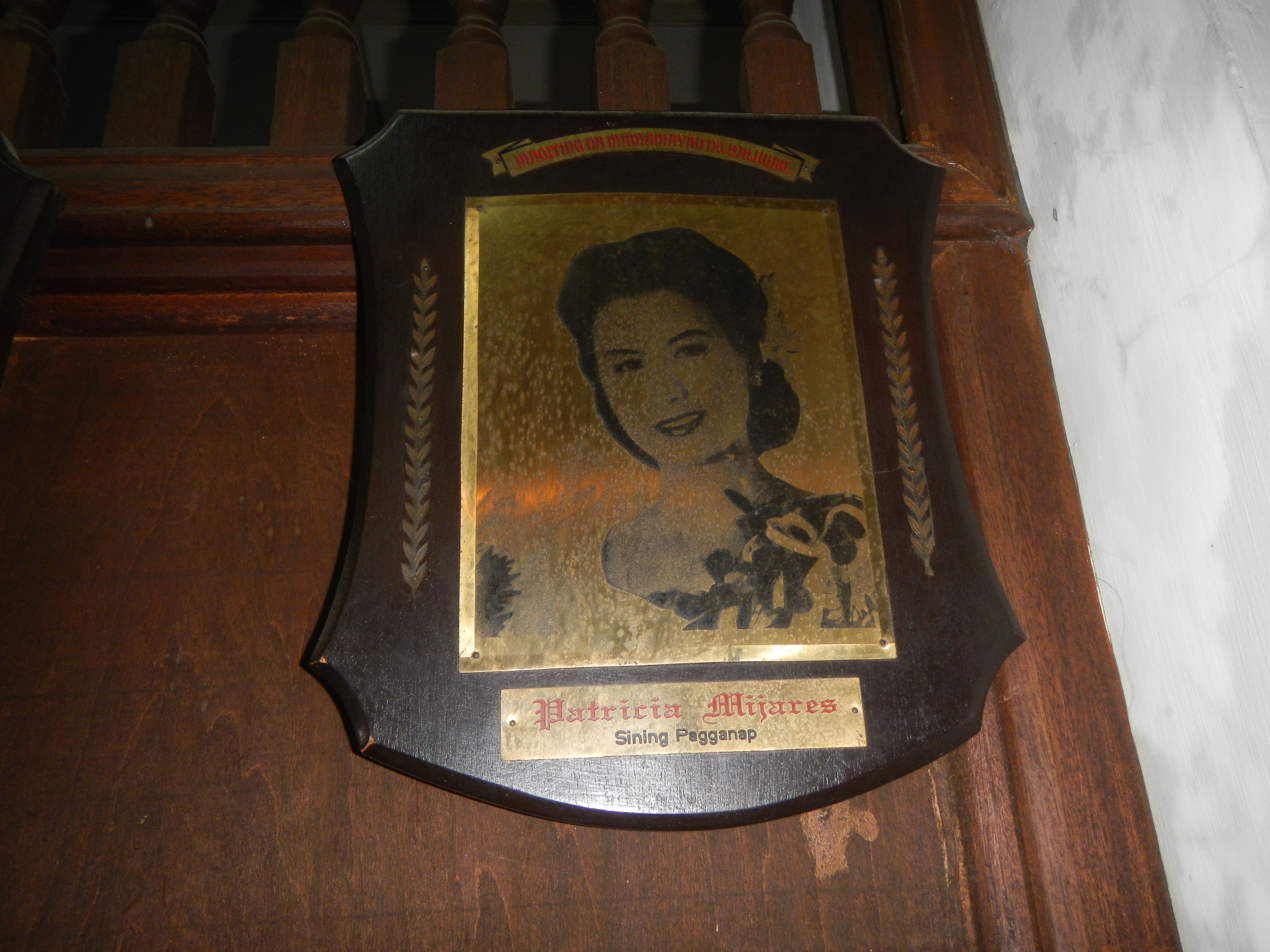
Patricia Mijares (Baliwag Museum and Library)

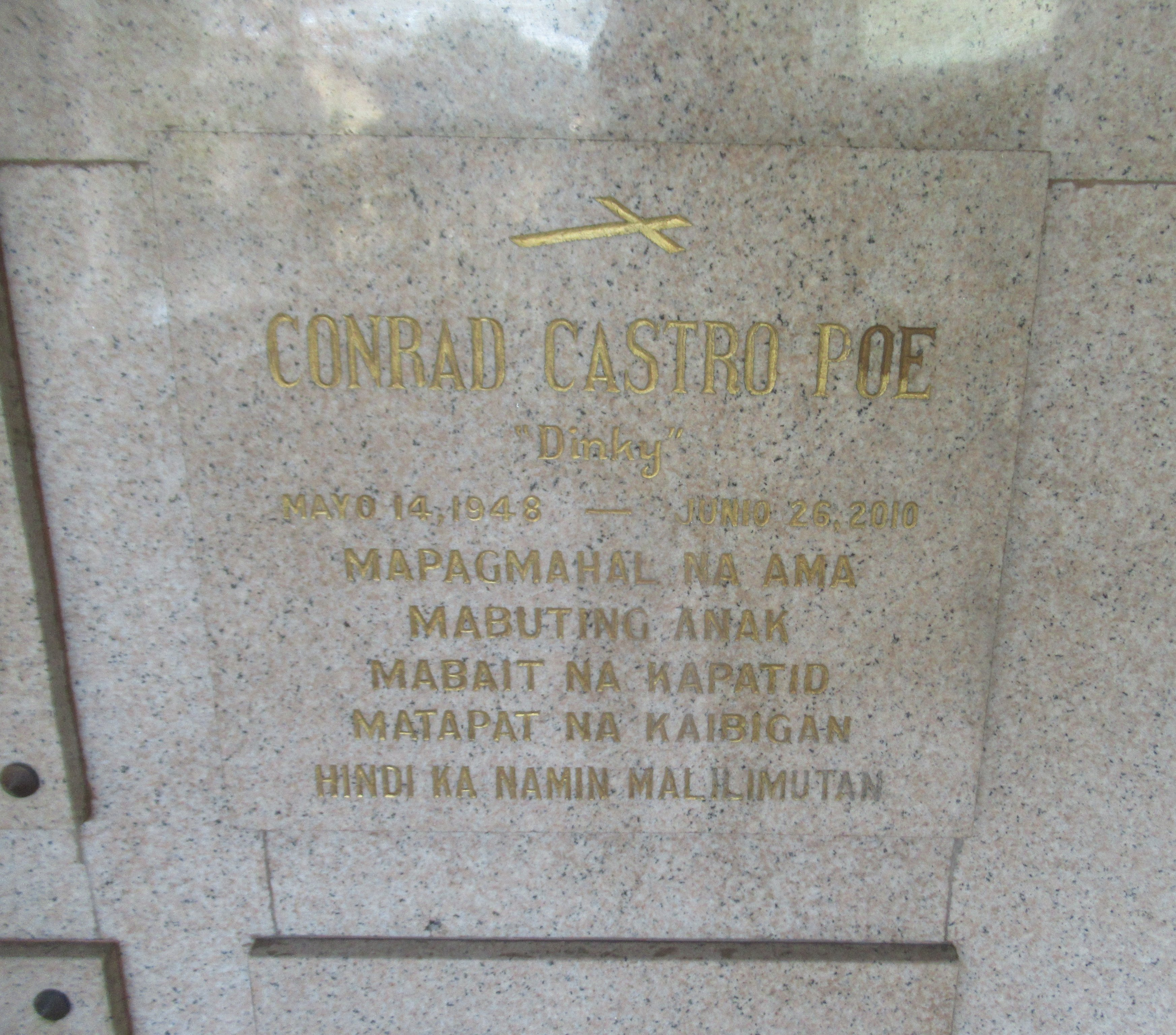
Poe's grave at Manila North Cemetery.

== Personal life ==
He was married to housewife Zenaida Marcelo-Poe. He died of heart disease and stroke on June 26, 2010, and was cremated and buried in July 2010.

== Filmography ==
=== Film ===
Year	Title	Role
1966	Buenavista	De Guzman
1968	Si Romeo at si Julieta	
1973	Hulihin si ... Tiagong Akyat (Santiago Ronquillo)	
1974	Bandila ng Magigiting	
1974	Ibilanggo si... Cavite Boy	
1976	Ikaw... Ako Laban sa Mundo!	
1976	Beragdo: Terror of Cavite	
1976	Ang Lihim ni Rosa Henson sa Buhay ni Kumander Lawin	
1976	Bertong Suklab	
1976	Mapang-akit... ang Dilim ng Gabi	
1977	Gulapa: Ang Barakong Mayor ng Maragondon	
1977	Sudden Death	
1979	Alas at Reyna	
1979	Isa Para sa Lahat, Lahat Para sa Isa	
1980	Tatak Angustia	Salvo
1980	Aguila	Karim
1980	Hulihin si Boy Negro	Boy Negro
1981	Kamandag ng Rehas Na Bakal	
1983	Kumander Melody	
1983	Alex San Diego: Wanted	
1984	Gintong Araw ni... Boy Madrigal	
1985	Carding Estrabel: Tirador ng Malabon	
1985	Miguel Cordero	
1985	Gamitin Mo Ako	
1985	Baun Gang	
1985	Hulihin si... Mortemer 'Bitoy' Marcelo: Celeste Gang	
1985	Mga Manikang Hubad	
1985	Boboy Tibayan: Tigre ng Cavite	
1986	Karanasan: The Claudia Zobel Story	
1986	Isa Lang ang Dapat Mabuhay	
1986	Anak ng Supremo	(Released Date: April 10, 1986)
1986	The Jun Labo Story	
1986	Pepe Saclao: Public Enemy No. 1	
1986	Raid: Casa	
1986	Ninong 2: Esteban Jose	
1986	Sgt. Villapando: A.W.O.L.	
1987	Dugong Muslim	
1987	Ultimatum: Ceasefire!	
1987	Humanda Ka... Ikaw ang Susunod	
1987	Walang Malay	
1988	Tubusin Mo ng Dugo	
1988	Dongalo Massacre	
1988	Ang Anino ni Asedillo	Simon Crisostomo
1989	Violent Zone	Pham
1989	Arrest: Pat. Rizal Alih – Zamboanga Massacre	
1989	Bala... Dapat Kay Cris Cuenca (Public Enemy No.1 of Region 4)	
1989	Delima Gang	Omar
1989	Joe Pring: Homicide, Manila Police	
1989	Durugin ng Bala si Peter Torres	
1989	Mula Paa Hanggang Ulo	Karding
1989	Target... Police General (Maj. Gen. Alfredo S. Lim Story)	
1990	Ibabaon Kita sa Lupa	
1990	David Balondo ng Tondo	
1990	Walang Awa Kung Pumatay	Hepe. Razon
1990	Bala at Rosario	
1990	Hanggang Saan ang Tapang Mo?	Mellie
1990	Walang Piring ang Katarungan	
1991	Kidlat ng Maynila: Joe Pring 2	Lopez
1991	Capt. Jaylo: Batas sa Batas	Ruding Buwang (Released Date: September 18, 1991)
1991	Sgt. Gabo: Walang Patawad Kung Pumatay	(Released Date: July 11, 1991)
1991	Takas sa Impyerno	
1992	Magdaleno Orbos: Sa Kuko ng Mga Lawin	
1992	Dudurugin Kita ng Bala ko	
1992	Lacson: Batas ng Navotas	
1992	Mahal ... Saan Ka Natulog Kagabi?	
1992	Patayin si Billy Zapanta	Wally (Released Date: December 10, 1992)
1993	Masahol Pa sa Hayop	Sgt. Quijano
1993	Manila Boy	Alvarez
1993	Aguinaldo	
1993	Sgt. Alvarez: Ex-Marine	
1993	Pulis Patola	
1993	Tumbasan Mo ng Buhay	
1994	Oo Na, Sige Na!	Rina's Bodyguard
1994	Nagkataon ... Nagkatagpo	Amy's Boyfriend
1994	Baby Paterno: Dugong Pulis	
1994	Epimaco Velasco, NBI	Big-Four Man
1995	Hanggang sa Huling Bala	
1995	Alfredo Lim: Batas ng Maynila	
1995	Bocaue Pagoda Tragedy	Rick Castelo
1996	Hindi Lahat ng Ahas Ay nasa Gubat	
1996	Diego	
1996	Madaling Mamatay, Mahirap Mabuhay	
1996	Kristo	Andrew
1996	Batas Ko Ay Bala	
1996	Isa Lang ang Dapat Mahalin	
1996	Onyok Tigasin	
1996	Bagsik ng Kamao	
1997	Tawagin Mo Na ang Lahat ng Santo	
1997	Tapatan ng Tapang	
1997	Angel de Jesus, Masikip ang Mundo para sa Iyo	
1997	Mariano Mison: NBI	
1997	Mapanuksong Hiyas	
1997	Bobby Barbers, Parak	Bianong
1997	Babangon ang Huling Patak ng Dugo	Kumander Gaspar
1997	Buenavista: Kapag Dumanak ang Dugo	
1997	Ang Maton at ang Showgirl	
1998	Dr. X on the Air	
1999	Kalaro	Condrado Avellana
1999	Ako ang Lalagot sa Hininga Mo	
2000	Tumbador	
2000	Sagot Kita: Mula Ulo Hanggang Paa	Madam X
2001	Lakas at Pag-Ibig	
2001	Dudurugin Ko Pati Buto Mo	Marino
2001	Parehas ang Laban	
2002	Walang Iba Kundi Ikaw	
2002	Lapu-Lapu	Christoforo
2003	Hiram	
2008	Anak ng Kumander	
2009	Salat	

=== Writer ===
Year	Title	Writer
1992	Alyas Boy Kano	Story and Screenplay

== Death ==
The late Fernando Poe, Jr.’s low-key half-brother-actor Conrad Poe died on the morning of June 26, 2010, in his home in Meycauayan City, Bulacan. He was 62. Conrad had been nursing a heart disease before suffering a fatal stroke before dawn on Saturday.
