= Asedillo =

1971 Filipino film directed by Celso Advento Castillo

- Theatrical poster
- Directed by: Celso Ad Castillo
- Screenplay by: Celso Ad Castillo
- Story by: Celso Ad Castillo
- Produced by: FPJ
- Starring: Fernando Poe Jr.
- Cinematography: Sergio Lobo
- Edited by: Augusto Salvador
- Music by: Restie Umali
- Production company: FPJ Productions
- Distributed by: FPJ Productions
- Release date: September 3, 1971
- Running time: 127 minutes
- Country: Philippines
- Language: Filipino

Asedillo is a 1971 Philippine biographical period action film written and directed by Celso Ad Castillo and produced by Fernando Poe Jr., who also stars in the lead role of Teodoro Asedillo, a former schoolteacher-turned-labor leader who later became known as "The Terror of the Sierra Madre". The film co-stars Paquito Diaz, Barbara Perez, and Carlos Padilla Jr.

The film, while critically and commercially a success, is infamous for having begun the SOP of informing cinema owners ahead of time if Fernando Poe Jr. will die in his films as a riot ensued following the death of Poe's character in a screening in Zamboanga.

== Cast and characters ==
- Fernando Poe Jr. as Teodoro Asedillo
- Paquito Diaz as Vicente
- Barbara Perez as Julia
- Jose Romulo as Pepe
- Carlos Padilla Jr.
- Rebecca
- Imelda Ilanan
- Lito Anzures as Tano
- Roberto Talabis as Tonyo
- Ruel Vernal as Abel

== Production ==
Scenes from the film were shot in Kalayaan, Laguna.

== Awards and nominations ==
Award-Giving Body	Category	Recipient	Result
1972 FAMAS Awards
1972 FAMAS Awards	Best Actor	Fernando Poe Jr.	Won
1972 FAMAS Awards	Best Picture	Asedillo	Nominated
