= Fernando Poe Jr. =

Filipino actor, film director, and politician (1939–2004)

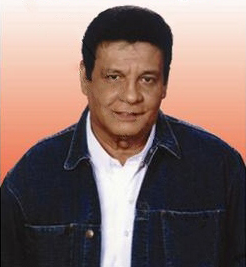
- Poe in 1996
- Born: Ronald Allan Kelley Poe; August 20, 1939; Manila, Philippine Commonwealth
- Died: December 14, 2004 (aged 65); Quezon City, Philippines
- Resting place: Manila North Cemetery, Santa Cruz, Manila, Philippines
- Education: Mapua Institute of Technology; University of the East
- Occupations: Actor; film director; producer; screenwriter
- Years active: 1955–2004
- Political party: KNP (2003–2004)
- Spouse: Susan Roces (m. 1968)
- Children: 3, including Grace and Lovi
- Awards: List: Order of National Artists of the Philippines

Ronald Allan Kelley Poe (August 20, 1939 – December 14, 2004), known professionally as Fernando Poe Jr., was a Filipino actor, director and screenwriter. Nicknamed "Da King" and often referred to by his initials FPJ, he has been described as a cultural icon, having dominated the Philippine box-office from the 1960s to 1990s through his leading roles in action films. For his career that spanned nearly five decades, he has received numerous honors including the Order of National Artists of the Philippines in 2006 and the CCP Centennial Honors for the Arts in 1999.

Poe appeared in around 300 films from 1955 to 2003. (Note: Sources disagree on the number of Poe's films. Estimates vary from "over 200", "nearly 300", "exactly 259", and "more than 300".) Poe entered the film industry as a stuntman following the death of his father, actor Fernando Poe Sr., and made his film debut in 1955 with Anak ni Palaris, a sequel to a film that starred his father. His breakout came in the 1956 film Lo Waist Gang and went on to star in action films that portrayed him as the "champion and defender of the poor and oppressed". His notable films include: Only the Brave Know Hell (1965), Lino Brocka's Santiago! (1970), Celso Ad. Castillo's Asedillo (1971), Bato sa Buhangin (1976), Durugin si Totoy Bato (1979), Eddie Romero's Aguila (1980); his self-directed Ang Panday (1980) and its sequels; Roman Rapido and Isang Bala Ka Lang! (both 1983), the 1986 films Iyo ang Tondo, Kanya ang Cavite, Muslim .357, and Batang Quiapo; Kahit Konting Pagtingin (1990), Ang Probinsyano (1996), Isusumbong Kita sa Tatay Ko... (1999), Ang Dalubhasa (2000), and Batas ng Lansangan (2002).

Poe's accolades include five FAMAS Awards for Best Actor (Note: Mga Alabok sa Lupa (1967), Asedillo (1971), Durugin si Totoy Bato (1979), Umpisahan Mo... Tatapusin Ko (1983), and Muslim .357 (1986).)—a joint record (Note: Joseph Estrada, Christopher de Leon, and Eddie Garcia have each also won five FAMAS Awards for Best Actor.) that inducted him into the FAMAS Hall of Fame in 1988. He also won Best Director for his films Ang Padrino (1984) and Kahit Butas ng Karayom, Papasukin Ko (1995). In 2004, FAMAS posthumously granted him the Natatanging Alagad ng Sining Award. Poe was also posthumously declared a National Artist of the Philippines in 2006 (accepted by his family in 2012).

Poe ran for president of the Philippines in the 2004 election. He lost to the incumbent Gloria Macapagal Arroyo by just over one million votes (3.48%)—the closest margin by percentage between the winner and runner-up in the history of Philippine presidential elections. Seven months after the election, Poe died of a stroke; hundreds of thousands attended his wake and funeral.

Poe was married to actress Susan Roces, who played his onscreen love interest in 17 films. He is the father of Senator Grace Poe and actress Lovi Poe.

== Early life and education ==
Ronald Allan Kelley Poe was the son of Filipino actor and director Fernando Poe Sr. (born Allan Fernando Poe y Reyes; 1916–1951) from San Carlos, Pangasinan and Elizabeth "Bessie" Kelley (1918–1999). He was born in Manila on August 20, 1939. He was known as "Ronnie" to his family.

His parents, at the time of his birth, were not legally married until 1940. In 2004, Poe's political opponents tried to derail his bid for the 2004 Philippine presidency when they sought to disqualify him as an illegitimate son of a non-Filipino mother.

He was the second among six siblings, including Andy (born Fernando Kelley Poe Jr.; 1943–1995), whose given name was used by Poe as his own professional name to bank on the popularity of his father who was a top actor in his time. Conrad Poe was Poe's half-brother, the illegitimate son of Fernando Poe Sr. and actress Patricia Mijares.

The original spelling of the family surname was Pou, from his paternal grandfather, playwright Lorenzo Pou, a Catalan migrant from Mallorca, Spain, who ventured into mining and business in the Philippines.

In 1953, Poe finished his primary education at San Beda College. For high school, he attended San Sebastian College. He continued his education at Mapúa Institute of Technology and University of the East and took the course theater arts.

When his father died from rabies at age 34, Poe became the family's breadwinner. In order to support his family, he dropped out of the University of the East during his sophomore year.

== Film career ==
Poe dropped out of college to work in the Philippine film industry as a messenger boy, and was given acting roles in subsequent years. Starting as a stuntman for Everlasting Pictures, he was given a starring role in the film Anak ni Palaris (Son of Palaris) at the age of 14. The film, however, was not a big hit. In 1956, the film Lo' Waist Gang made him popular, and the film was such a hit that low-waist pants became a fad.

Also known as 'FPJ' from his initials, Poe acted in a number of films which depicted him as the champion of the poor and downtrodden. He also directed films under the pseudonyms D'Lanor and Ronwaldo Reyes. Reyes originated from the surname of his paternal grandmother, Martha.

He established FPJ Productions in 1961 and later organized other film companies. In 1963, he testified against criminal gangs, known as the Big Four, who extorted money from the film industry. In 1965, he shared the lead in The Ravagers (in the Philippines this is titled Only the Brave Know Hell), a film depicting the United States and the Philippines working together against Japanese war time occupation. The film is considered one of the most influential Filipino films.

Poe won the most best actor awards at the FAMAS. Among the films that received awards were Mga Alabok sa Lupa (1967), Asedillo (1971), Durugin si Totoy Bato (1979), Umpisahan Mo, Tatapusin Ko (1983), and Muslim .357 (1986).

Poe was one of the highest paid film actors in the Philippines in the 1980s (alongside Dolphy and Vilma Santos), with his salary reaching over one million pesos per film. In 1988, Poe partnered with San Miguel Corporation in a near ₱27 million promotional deal for San Miguel Beer, his first endorsement of a product in his entire film career, with the first television commercial airing on January 20.

In mid-1993, Poe was then set to star in a film produced by Viva Films and directed by Pablo Santiago titled Tulak ng Bibig, Kabig ng Dibdib, with Alice Dixson cast as the female lead, though it did not come to fruition.

Among his roles were Flavio in the Ang Panday fantasy series, Kahit Konting Pagtingin, Dito sa Pitong Gatang and Aguila. His last film, Pakners, also stars 9-ball billiards champion Efren "Bata" Reyes.

== Political career ==
=== 2004 Presidential bid ===
Fernando Poe Jr. was the Koalisyon ng Nagkakaisang Pilipino (KNP)'s candidate for the 2004 presidential election. He accepted nomination in December 2003 and was to be the opposition candidate in the Philippines' 2004 presidential election.

== Personal life ==
Poe married actress Susan Roces, the professional name of Jesusa Sonora, in a civil wedding in December 1968. They later married in a religious service and among their primary sponsors were then-President Ferdinand Marcos and First Lady Imelda. Poe and Roces adopted a daughter, Grace Poe, who became a senator.

Poe was very reclusive about his personal life. However, in February 2004, during the presidential campaign, Poe admitted to having fathered two children out of wedlock. He had an affair with actress Anna Marin and had one son, Ronian and with former actress Rowena Moran and had a daughter, Lourdes Virginia. While he publicly acknowledged two children out of wedlock, reports indicated that he allegedly fathered two more other children. Sources claimed that he had a child from a former actress named "Monica", who was born in 1960. Their child has been reported living in Hawaii. There were claims that Poe had another child from a comedian-actress.

Poe was also a known horse owner and horse racing enthusiast.

== Death and legacy ==
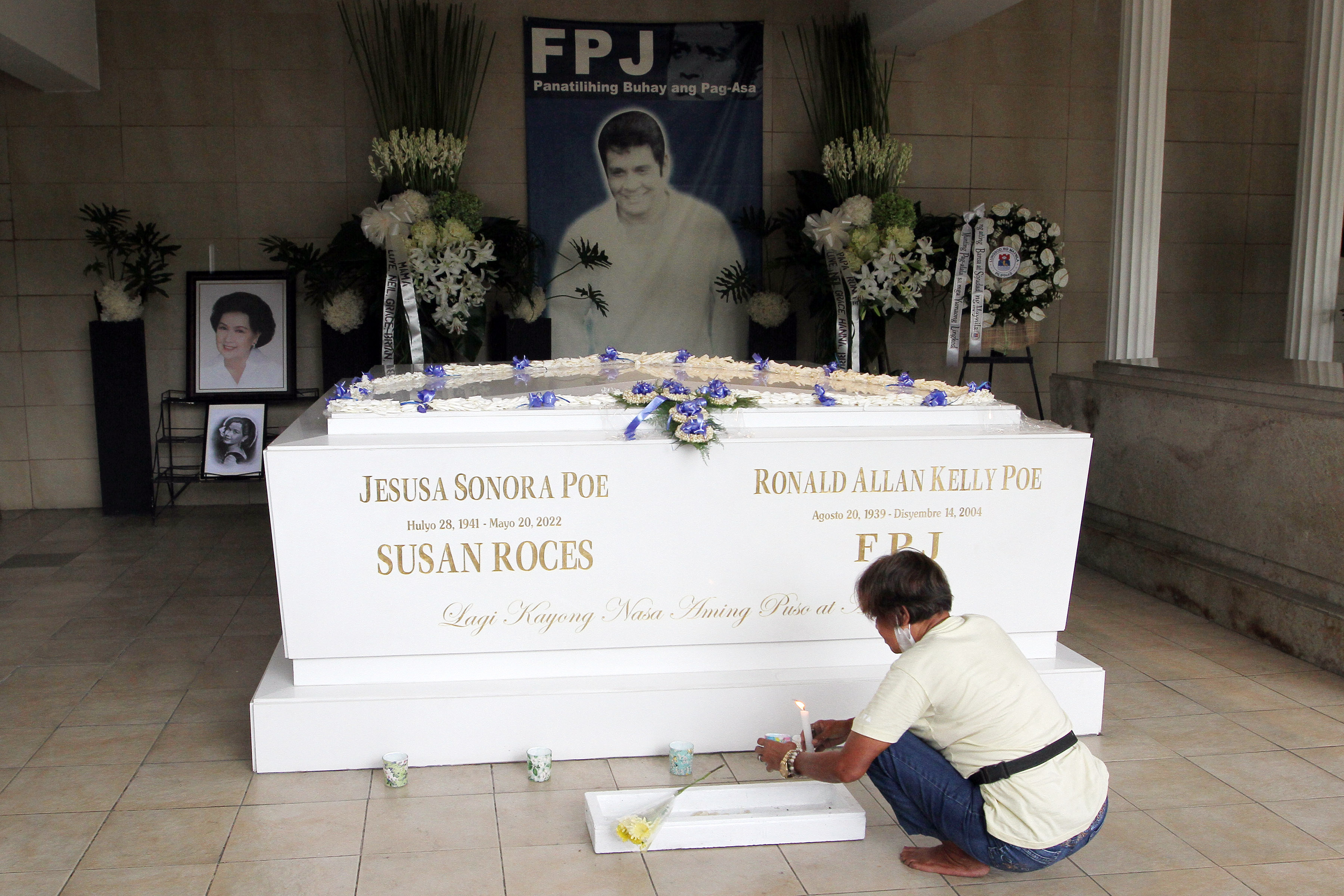
Tomb of Poe and his wife Susan Roces at the Manila North Cemetery

FPJ Studios along Del Monte Avenue, Quezon City in 2022

Poe was admitted to St. Luke's Medical Center in Quezon City in the evening of December 11, 2004, after complaining of dizziness at a gathering in his production studio during a Christmas party. He suffered from a stroke and slipped into a coma while being treated for a brain clot. Doctors described his condition as a cerebral thrombosis with multiple organ failure. He died at the age of 65 on December 14 at 12:01 am PHT (UTC+08:00), without regaining consciousness. His remains were initially transferred to the Arlington East Memorial Chapels in Pasig (now known as the Evergreen Memorial Chapels), before being transferred a day later to the Santo Domingo Church in Quezon City. Organizers of the nine-day wake claimed numbers as high as two million. The funeral procession drew tens of thousands who crowded the streets of Quezon City, an event which drew comparisons to the funeral processions of former Senator Ninoy Aquino in August 1983 – who also had his wake held at the Santo Domingo Church – and of actress Julie Vega in May 1985. He was buried in his family plot along with his parents in the Manila North Cemetery.

=== Aftermath ===
On December 14, 2012, eight years after his death, a monument to Poe was erected at the corner of Roxas Boulevard and Arquiza Street in Ermita, Manila, with widow Susan Roces and daughter Grace Poe attending the unveiling. In 2013, Tonton Gutierrez portrayed Fernando Poe Jr. in the life story of Poe's daughter Grace Poe, depicted by Erich Gonzales, on Maalaala Mo Kaya. In 2015, his 1997 film Ang Probinsyano was remade by ABS-CBN into a TV series, starring Coco Martin as the main character to portray twins namely SPO1 Ricardo "Cardo" Dalisay and Police Sr. Insp. Dominador "Ador" de Leon together with Susan Roces, FPJ's widow.On January 13, 2022, President Rodrigo Duterte signed Republic Act No. 11608, renaming Roosevelt Avenue in Quezon City as Fernando Poe Jr. Avenue.

On his 84th birth anniversary on August 20, 2023, Roosevelt station of LRT Line 1 in Quezon City was renamed Fernando Poe Jr. station; FPJ Arena, a sports arena in San Jose, Batangas also named in his honor, was inaugurated. The FPJ Film Archives has been inscribed in the National Memory of the World Register of the Philippines. In horse racing, Poe was posthumously inducted in the Philippine Racing Commission (Philracom) Hall of Fame in 2023 for promoting the discipline through his films. The main road within the MetroTurf Racecourse complex in Batangas was also named after Poe.

== Filmography ==
Year	Title	Role
1955	Anak ni Palaris	
1956	Simaron	An extra
1956	Babaeng Mandarambong	
1956	Lo' Waist Gang	
1957	Kamay ni Cain	Ernesto
1957	Bakasyon Grande	
1957	Tipin	
1957	Los Lacuacheros	
1957	H-Line Gang	
1957	Bicol Express	Tonying
1957	Student Canteen	
1958	Lutong Makaw	
1958	Pepeng Kaliwete	
1958	May Pasikat Ba sa Kano	
1958	Obra Maestra	
1958	Atrebida	
1958	Lo’ Waist Gang at si Og sa Mindoro	
1958	Laban sa Lahat	
1958	Bon Voyage	
1959	Prinsesa Naranja	
1959	Rolling Rockers	
1959	Duke de Borgoña	
1959	Eva Dragon	
1959	Hawaiian Boy	Ronnie
1959	Tough Guy	
1959	Big Time Berto	(cameo)
1959	Pitong Gatang	
1959	Anak ng Bulkan	Ramon Barva
1960	Gabi ng Lagim	(cameo)
1960	Markado	
1960	Rancho Grande	
1960	Lo Waist Gang Joins the Armed Forces	
1960	Walang daigdig	
1960	Materiales Fuertes	(cameo)
1960	Viuda De Ojo	
1960	Sutlang Bakal	
1960	True Confessions	
1960	Sarhento Salcedo	
1961	Kilabot sa Barilan	
1961	Walang Patawad!	
1961	Tatlong Baraha	
1961	Sandata at Pangako	
1961	Sakristan Mayor	
1961	Dakilang 9	
1961	Baril sa Baril	
1961	Apollo Robles	
1961	Ikaw o Ako!	
1961	Pasong Diablo	
1961	Hinahamon Kita...	
1961	Matapang sa Matapang	
1962	Walang Pagkalupig	
1962	Hari sa Barilan	
1962	Suicide Commandoes	
1962	Mga Tigreng Taga-Bukid	
1962	4 Valientes	
1962	Mapusok Na Paghihiganti	
1962	Batang Maynila	
1962	Ako ang Katarungan	
1962	Albano Brothers	
1962	Leon Marahas	
1962	Pagtutuos ng Mga Kilabot	
1962	Masikip ang Daigdig	
1963	The Big Show	(cameo)
1963	Callejon 11	
1963	Sa Pagitan ng Dalawang Mata	
1963	Fandong Asintado	Fando
1963	Ito ang Maynila	
1963	Limang Kidlat	
1963	Los Palikeros	
1963	Tahimik, Ngunit.... Mapanganib	
1963	Magnong Mandurukot	Magno
1963	Kung Hindi Ka Susuko	
1963	Angkan ng Matatapang	
1963	Bilis ng Kamay!	
1963	Sierra Madre	
1963	Sigaw ng Digmaan	
1963	12 Kuba	
1964	Intramuros	
1964	Mano-Mano	
1964	Maskarados	
1964	Geron Busabos: Ang Batang Quiapo	(cameo)
1964	Daniel Barrion	
1964	Walang Hanggan!	
1964	Baril Na Ginto	
1964	Orlando Romano	
1964	Saan Mang Sulok ng Daigdig	
1964	Kumander Fidela	
1964	9 Laban sa Lahat	
1965	Hanggang May Kalaban	
1965	Ang Daigdig Ko'y Ikaw	Roman
1965	Sa Bawa't Hakbang... Panganib!	Sanchez
1965	Tierra Verde	
1965	Pilipinas Kong Mahal	
1965	Ang Salarin	
1965	Ang Mananandata	
1965	Maginoong Tulisan	
1965	Only the Brave Know Hell	Sgt. Rubinio Gaudiel
1965	Tatak Barbaro	
1965	Anghel sa Aking Balikat	
1966	Dakilang Balatkayo	
1966	Ang Haragan	
1966	Let's Do the Freddie	(cameo)
1966	San Bernardo	
1966	Zamboanga	
1966	Franco Maderro	Franco Maderro
1966	Sarhento Aguila at ang 9 Na Magigiting’’	
1966	Baril sa Aking Kamay	
1966	Diegong Akyat	
1966	Lupong Balisong	
1966	Hanggang May Buhay	
1967	Dugo sa Buhangin	
1967	Ex-Convict	
1967	Mga Alabok sa Lupa	
1967	Langit at Lupa	
1967	Matimbang ang Dugo sa Tubig	Nando
1967	Roman Montalan	
1967	...At Sila'y Dumating	
1967	Alamat ng 7 Kilabot	
1968	Alyas 1-2-3	
1968	Baril at Rosaryo	
1968	3 Hari	
1968	Tanging Ikaw!	
1968	To Susan with Love	
1968	Sorrento	
1968	Ang Pagbabalik ni Daniel Barrion	
1968	Magpakailanman	
1968	Ang Mangliligpit	
1968	Dos Por Dos	
1968	Ang Dayuhan	
1968	Barbaro Cristobal	
1969	[[<Perlas ng Silangan>]]	
1969	Ginintuang Kamay	
1969	Nardong Kutsero	
1969	14	
1969	Fando	
1969	Batang Matadero	
1969	Ikaw ang Lahat sa Akin	Efren
1970	Tierra... Sangre...	
1970	Divina Gracia	
1970	Mga Anghel Na Walang Langit	(cameo)
1970	Santiago!	Gonzalo
1971	Digmaan ng Mga Angkan	
1971	Dampot Pukol Salo	
1971	Asedillo	Teodoro Asedillo
1971	Fastbreak	—N/a
1971	Ang Kampana sa Santa Quiteria	
1971	Alas, Hari at Sota	
1972	Santo Domingo	
1972	Ang Alamat	
1972	Salaginto't Salagubang	
1972	Magiting at Pusakal	
1973	Esteban	
1973	Dugo ng Bayan	
1973	Ang Agila at ang Araw	
1973	Sto. Cristo	
1973	Karnabal	
1974	Batya't Palu-Palo	
1974	Ang Pangalan "Mediavillo"	
1974	Sanctuario	
1974	Happy Days Are Here Again	
1975	Hotdog: Unang Kagat	(cameo)
1975	Alupihang Dagat	Gomer
1975	Pagbabalik ng Lawin	
1975	Anino ng Araw	Regidor
1975	Dugo at Pag-ibig sa Kapirasong Lupa (third segment)	
1975	Tatak ng Alipin	Aurelio
1976	Ang Leon at ang Daga	
1976	Alakdang Gubat	
1976	Bato sa Buhangin	Rafael "Paeng" Longalong
1976	Andalucia	Father Eliseo
1977	Nagbabagang Asero	Maru
1977	Tutubing Kalabaw, Tutubing Karayom	
1977	Totoy Bato	Totoy Bato
1977	Bontoc	Charles Limawin
1977	Tundo: Isla Puting-Bato	Hernan "Nanding" S. Perez
1977	Little Christmas Tree	
1978	Ang Lalaki... Ang Alamat... Ang Baril	
1978	Kumander Ulupong	Kumander Ulupong
1978	Patayin si... Mediavillo	Mediavillo
1978	Mga Mata ni Angelita	Conrado, the ex-convict
1978	King	
1978	Tatak ng Tundo	Berting
1979	Isa Para sa Lahat, Lahat Para sa Isa	
1979	...At Muling Nagbaga ang Lupa	
1979	Angelita... Ako ang Iyong Ina	Conrado
1979	Mahal...Saan Ka Nanggaling Kagabi?	
1979	Durugin si Totoy Bato	Totoy Bato
1979	Mahal... Ginagabi Ka Na Naman	
1979	Ang Lihim ng Guadalupe	
1980	Boy Negro	
1980	Ang Agila at ang Falcon	
1980	Aguila	Gen. Daniel T. Aguila
1980	Ang Leon at ang Kuting	
1980	Kalibre .45	
1980	Ang Panday	Flavio / Panday
1981	Iskorokotoy	
1981	Ang Maestro	Hernan de Zuñiga
1981	Bandido sa Sapang Bato	
1981	Sierra Madre	
1981	Sambahin ang Ngalan Mo	Crisanto
1981	Pagbabalik ng Panday	Flavio / Panday
1982	Pepeng Kaliwete	Pepeng Kaliwete
1982	Manedyer...Si Kumander	Gener
1982	Daniel Bartolo ng Sapang Bato	Daniel Bartolo
1982	Ang Panday: Ikatlong Yugto	Flavio / Panday
1983	Brando Bandido	(cameo)
1983	Roman Rapido	Roman Rapido
1983	Kapag Buhay ang Inutang	Mario Magtanggol
1983	Umpisahan Mo, Tatapusin Ko!	Delfin Prado
1983	Isang Bala Ka Lang!	Berting Rodriguez
1984	Sigaw ng Katarungan	Alfredo Javier
1984	Daang Hari	
1984	Ang Padrino	Emong Sanchez
1984	Ang Panday IV: Ika-Apat Na Aklat	Flavio / Panday
1985	Isa-Isa Lang!	Carding Briñas
1985	Partida	Ben Serrano
1986	Iyo ang Tondo Kanya ang Cavite	Crisanto
1986	Muslim .357	1st Lt. Jamal Razul
1986	Batang Quiapo	Baldomero "Baldo" Dimaguiba
1987	Kapag Lumaban ang Api	Julio
1987	Batas sa Aking Kamay	
1987	Kamao^{^{[I]}}	
1987	No Retreat... No Surrender... Si Kumander	Gener
1987	Kapag Puno Na ang Salop	P/Sgt. Isagani Guerrero
1988	Ang Anino ni Asedillo	Teodoro Asedillo ("special appearance")
1988	One Day, Isang Araw	Pastor
1988	Sheman: Mistress of the Universe	(uncredited cameo)
1988	Gawa Na ang Bala Na Papatay sa Iyo	David Villafuerte
1988	Agila ng Maynila	Mauro Reyes
1989	Wanted: Pamilya Banal	Victor Banal
1989	Ako ang Huhusga	P/Sgt. Isagani Guerrero
1990	Kahit Konting Pagtingin	Delfin Maniego
1990	Hindi Ka Na Sisikatan ng Araw: Kapag Puno Na ang Salop Part-III	P/Lt. Isagani Guerrero
1990	May Isang Tsuper ng Taxi	Nanding
1991	Batas ng .45	P/Cpt. Celso Magsalin
1991	Mabuting Kaibigan, Masamang Kaaway	Armando "Mando" Guevarra
1992	Dito sa Pitong Gatang	Chairman Berting Cayabyab
1992	Isang Bala Ka Lang... Part-II	Berting Rodriguez
1992	Lakay	P/Col. Juanito Lagasca
1994	Hindi Pa Tapos ang Laban	Carding Villamar
1994	Epimaco Velasco: NBI	Atty. Epimaco Velasco
1994	Walang Matigas Na Tinapay sa Mainit Na Kape	Mike
1994	Ang Pagbabalik ni Pedro Penduko	Flavio / Panday
1995	Minsan Pa: Kahit Konting Pagtingin Part 2	Delfin Maniego
1995	Kahit Butas ng Karayom, Papasukin Ko	Sgt. Daniel Torres
1995	Ang Syota Kong Balikbayan	Nanding
1996	Hagedorn	Edward Hagedorn
1996	Ikaw ang Mahal Ko	Pilo
1996	Ang Probinsyano	PLt. Kardo de Leon and PCpt. Ador de Leon
1997	Eseng ng Tondo	P/Lt. Eusebio "Eseng" Natividad
1998	Pagbabalik ng Probinsyano	P/Lt. Kardo de Leon
1999	Isusumbong Kita sa Tatay Ko...	Badong Rivera
2000	Ang Dalubhasa	Maj. Jaime "Jimmy" de Guzman, M.D.
2001	Ayos Na... ang Kasunod	Ramon Trinidad
2002	Batas ng Lansangan	Maj. Ruben Medrano
2002	Ang Alamat ng Lawin	Lawin
2003	Pakners (Last movie appearance)	Nanding Escalante

^{I} Kamao is Poe's only film produced specifically for television, premiering on RPN in June 1987.

== Accolades ==
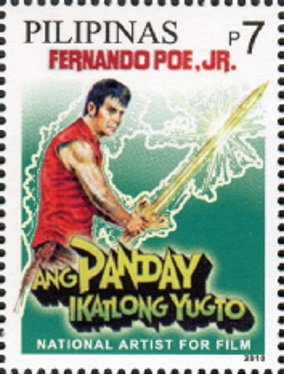
Poe, as depicted in a commemorative stamp, in 2010

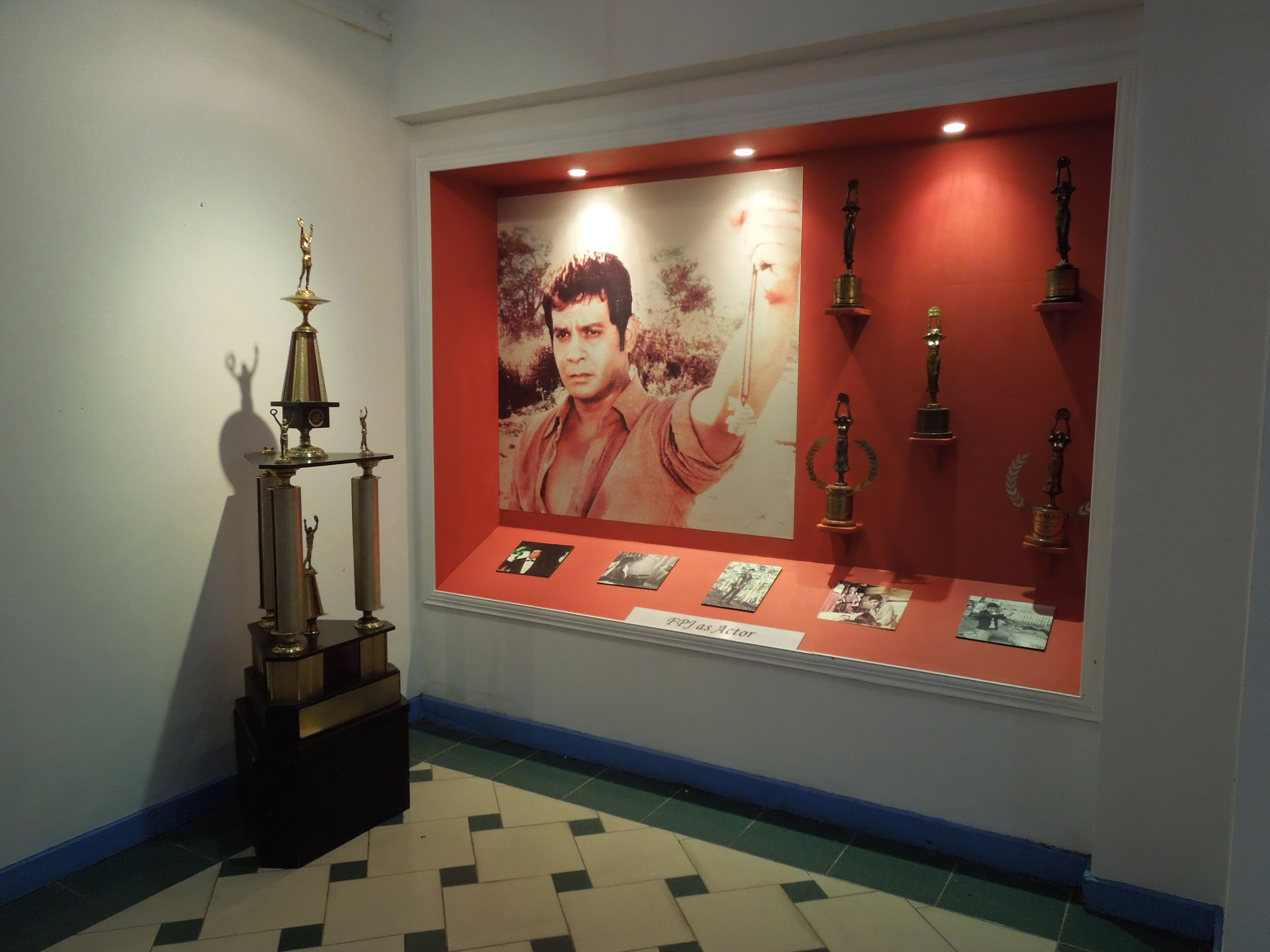
Poe's accolades displayed at the Mowelfund National Film Museum

=== Awards and nominations ===
FAMAS Awards
Year	Category	Nominated Work(s)	Result	Ref(s):
1959	Best Actor	Laban sa Lahat	Nominated	
1961	Best Actor	Walang Daigdig	Nominated	
1963	Best Actor	Walang Pagkalupig	Nominated	
1963	Best Actor	Ako ang Katarungan	Nominated	
1964	Best Actor	Sigaw ng Digmaan	Nominated	
1966	Best Actor	Pilipinas Kong Mahal	Nominated	
1968	Best Actor	Mga Alabok Sa Lupa	Won	
1969	Best Actor	Barbaro Cristobal	Nominated	
1971	Best Story	Mga Anghel na Walang Langit	Won	
1971	Best Actor	Santiago!	Nominated	
1972	Best Actor	Asedillo	Won	
1973	Best Actor	Ang Alamat	Nominated	
1976	Best Director	Alupihang Dagat	Nominated	
1980	Best Actor	Durugin si Totoy Bato	Won	
1982	Best Actor	Ang Maestro	Nominated	
1983	Best Director	Ang Panday: Ikatlong Yugto	Nominated	
1983	Best Actor	Ang Panday: Ikatlong Yugto	Nominated	
1984	Best Director	Umpisahan mo... Tatapusin ko!	Nominated	
1984	Best Actor	Umpisahan mo... Tatapusin ko!	Won	
1985	Best Actor	Sigaw ng Katarungan	Nominated	
1985	Best Director	Ang Padrino	Won	
1985	Best Screenplay	Ang Padrino	Won	
1986	Best Actor	The Lethal Hunt	Nominated	
1987	Best Actor	Muslim .357	Won	
1987	Best Director	Muslim .357	Nominated	
1988	FAMAS Hall of Fame	Actor	Won	
1990	Best Director	Ako...Ang Huhusga	Nominated	
1992	Best Director	Batas .45	Nominated	
1996	Best Director	Kahit Butas ng Karayom	Won	
1997	FAMAS Presidential Award	—N/a	Won	
1999	Best Director	Pagbabalik ng Probinsyano	Nominated	
2000	Lifetime Achievement Award	—N/a	Won	
2003	Best Actor	Batang Lansangan	Nominated	
2003	Best Director	Batang Lansangan	Nominated	

FAP Awards
Year	Category	Nominated Work(s)	Result	Ref(s):
1984	Best Actor	Umpisahan mo... Tatapusin ko!	Won	
1987	Best Actor	Muslim .357	Won	
1996	Best Actor	Kahit Butas ng Karayom	Nominated	
1998	Best Director	Eseng ng Tondo	Won	
1998	Best Actor	Eseng ng Tondo	Won	

Cinemanila International Film Festival
Year	Category	Result	Ref:
2000	Lifetime Achievement Award	Won	

Gawad Urian Awards
Year	Category	Result	Ref:
2002	Lifetime Achievement Award	Won	

2002 Metro Manila Film Festival
Year	Category	Nominated Work(s)	Result	Ref:
2002	Best Actor	Ang Alamat ng Lawin	Nominated	

Cinema One Digital Film Festivals
Year	Category	Result	Ref:
2009	Cinema One Legend Award (Posthumously)	Won	

== See also ==
- List of Memory of the World Documentary Heritage in the Philippines
- Fernando Poe Jr. presidential campaign, 2004
