= List of Philippine films of the 1990s =

A list of all films produced in the Philippines in the 1990s. For an A-Z see Category:Philippine films.

== 1990 ==
Film	Director	Producer	Cast	Genre	Production Company
1990
Dyesebel	Mel Chionglo		Richard Gomez, Alice Dixson, Dennis Roldan, Chat Silayan, Nadia Montenegro, Carmina Villarroel	Fantasy, romance	Regal Films
Kahit Konting Pagtingin	Pablo Santiago		Fernando Poe Jr., Sharon Cuneta, Ricky Davao	Action, romance	Viva Films
Barumbado	Wilfredo Milan	Christela Marie P. Yalung, Viveka C. Yalung	Robin Padilla, Monica Herrera, Lani Lobangco, Pinky De Leon, Michael de Mesa, Bomber Moran, Val Iglesias (as Val Iglesia), Ernie Forte, Romeo Rivera, Jun Hidalgo, Erra Espiritu (as Victor), July Hidalgo, Ivan Duval, Edward Luna, Bong Varona, Ramon Recto, Doming Olivar, Boy Sta. Maria (date of release: 22 March 1990)	Action	Cine Suerte
Biktima	Lino Brocka	Boy de Guia	Sharon Cuneta, Christopher de Leon	Horror	Viva Films
Gabo: Walang Patawad Kung Pumatay	Mauro Gia Samonte	Manolo Maglaya	Gabby Concepcion, Aiko Melendez, Patrick Dela Rosa, Donita Rose, Chris Aguilar, Dexter Doria, Ruel Vernal, Joaquin Fajardo, Robert Miller	Action, Drama	Regal Films
Ibabaon Kita sa Lupa	Toto Natividad	Manolo Maglaya	Lito Lapid, Bernard Bonnin, Patrick Dela Rosa, Lani Lobangco, Roldan Aquino, Robert Miller, Usman Hassim, Dick Israel (Date of Released: 28 March 1990)	Action	Regal Films
Kapag Wala Nang Batas	Gregg de Guzman		Chuck Perez, Maita Soriano, Amanda Amores, Dindo Arroyo, Renato del Prado, Mark Gil, Dennis Roldan	Action	Viva Films
Kung Tapos na ang Kailanman	Lino Brocka	Robbie Tan	Gary Valenciano, Gretchen Barretto, Princess Punzalan, Ricky Belmonte, Eddie Garcia, Gina Pareño, Helen Vela, Tina Godinez, Aurora Salve, Michael Locsin	Drama, romance	Seiko Films
Anak sa Una	Anthony Taylor		Tetchie Agbayani, Daisy Romualdez, Lito Legaspi, Bamba and Gino Antonio	Action	Emperor Films
Kabayo Kids	Tony Y. Reyes	Tony Fajardo	Tito Sotto, Vic Sotto, Joey de Leon	Comedy	Regal Films
Bala at Rosaryo	Pepe Marcos		Ramon "Bong" Revilla, Jr., Eddie Garcia, Efren Reyes Jr., Melissa Mendez, Kristine Garcia, RR Herrera, Ernie Forte, King Gutierrez, Mia Gutierrez	Action	Vision Films
Beautiful Girl	Laurice Guillen	Robbie Tan	Gretchen Barretto, Romnick Sarmenta, Isabel Rivas, Michael Locsin, Janet Arnaiz, Marco Sison	Drama, romance	Seiko Films
Kahit Singko Hindi Ko Babayaran ang Buhay Mo	Lito Lapid		Lito Lapid, Alma Moreno, Tony Ferrer, Robert Miller, Usman Hassim, Philip Henson, Tony Bagyo, Robert Talby, Big-Boy Gomez, Dick Israel, Robert Talabis	Action	Regal Films
Bagwis	Jett C. Espiritu	Elwood Perez	Chuck Perez, Panchito, Lani Lobangco, Romy Diaz, Rez Cortez, Odette Khan, Max Alvarado	Fantasy, horror, comedy	Solar Films, Inc.
Dadaan Ka sa Ibabaw ng Aking Bangkay	Dante Javier	Michael Tan	Ricky Davao, Monsour del Rosario, Patrick dela Rosa, Maritoni Fernandez, Johnny Delgado, Ernie David, Rey Solo, Flora Gasser, Honey Policarpio, Zandro Zamora, Johnny Vicar, Rommel Valdez, Big-Boy Gomez, Vic Belaro	Action	Red Horse Production
Kasalanan Bang Sambahin Ka?	Chito S. Roño		Vivian Velez, Dawn Zulueta, Julio Diaz	Drama	
Kristobal: Tinik sa Korona	Francis Posadas	Michael Tan	Jestoni Alarcon, John Regala, Rita Avila	Action	Seiko Films
Hindi Laruan ang Puso	Leroy Salvador	Robbie Tan	Cesar Montano, Gretchen Barretto, Rita Avila, Raul Zaragoza	Drama, romance	Seiko Films
Walang Awa Kung Pumatay	Junn P. Cabreira	Junn P. Cabreira	Robin Padilla, Rita Avila, Conrad Poe, Dick Israel, Zandro Zamora, Dexter Doria, Bomber Moran, Ernie David, Val Iglesias, Claudine Gomez, Honey Policarpio, Danny Riel, Romy Roumlo, Ernie Forte, Johnny 'Boy' Ramirez, Rudy Ramirez, Big Boy Gomez, Roger Moring, Jun Hidalgo, July Hidalgo, Gerry Roman, Vic Belaro, Roger Belaro, Gary 'Boy' Garcia, Richard Sicangco (as Li Chard Sicangco), Romy Ycasiano, Eddie Samonte, Eddie del Mar Jr., Rudy Vic Del, Olive Madridejos	Action, drama	Four N Films
Michael and Madonna	Tony Cruz	Tony Fajardo	Rene Requiestas, Manilyn Reynes, Ogie Alcasid, Nova Villa, Paquito Diaz, Ruben Rustia, Monica Ferrera, Nanding Fernandez, Aida Pedido, Zenda Cabangon	Comedy	Regal Films
Walang Piring ang Katarungan	Jesus Jose	Manolo Maglaya	Lito Lapid, Monica Herrera, Efren Reyes, Dick Israel, King Gutierrez, Conrad Poe, Chris Aguilar, Tony Bagyo, Robert Miller, Usman Hassim, and Rey Solo	Action	Regal Films
I Have 3 Eggs	Luciano B. Carlos	Tony Fajardo	Tito Sotto, Vic Sotto, Joey de Leon	Comedy	Regal Films
Ikasa Mo Ipuputok Ko!	Augusto Salvador	Ramon Salvador	Phillip Salvador, Michael de Mesa, Eddie Garcia, Bon Vibar, Maila Gumila, Sheila Ysrael, Perla Bautista, Ricky Rivero, Dindo Arroyo, Ernie David, Big Boy Gomez, Robert Miller, Usman Hassim, Polly Cadsawan, Robert Talabis, Rene Hawkins, Johnny Vicar	Action	Urban Films
Karapatan Ko ang Pumatay	Augusto Salvador, Ruben De Guzman	Christela Marie P. Yalung, Viveka C. Yalung	Lito Lapid, Subas Herrero, Paquito Diaz, Bomber Moran, Robert Miller, Usman Hassim, King Gutierrez, Joey Padilla, Eddie del Mar Jr., Robert Talabis	Action	Cine Suerte
Bad Boy	Eddie Rodriguez	William C. Leary	Robin Padilla, Cristina Gonzales, Daniel Fernando, Ronaldo Valdez, Perla Bautista, Mark Gil, Val Iglesias (as Val Iglesia)	Action	Viva Films
Hindi Kita Iiwanang Buhay (Kapitan Paile)	Dante Pangilinan	Manolo Maglaya	Miguel Rodriguez, Star Querubin, Maita Sanchez, Dick Israel, Bembol Roco, Rachel Lobangco, Robert Miller, Usman Hassim, Vic Varrion, Mario Escudero, Tony Bagyo, Ronnie Madrigal, and Chris Aguilar	Action	Regal Films
Apo Kingpin ng Maynila	Jose N. Carreon	Emilia Santos-Blas (Executive producer)	Ramon Bong Revilla Jr, Ramon Revilla, Lani Mercado, Subas Herrero, Zandro Zamora, Ruel Vernal, Usman Hassim, King Guttierez, Edwin Reyes, Rez Cortez, Robert Miller	Action	LEA Productions
Hepe: Isasabay Kita sa Paglubog Na Araw!	J. Erasteo Navoa	Roberto Genova (Executive producer)	Eddie Garcia, Marianne dela Riva, Honey Policarpio, Rey PJ Abellana, Tony Ferrer, Dick Israel, George Estregan Jr (Special Participated), Subas Herrero, Danny Riel, Eddie del Mar Jr., Michael Vergel (as Mike Vergel), Alex David, Conrad Poe, Dantley Reyes	Action	Double M Productions Big W Films
Anghel Molave: Sa Dugo ng Isang Balang Pumatay	Augusto Salvador	Ramon Salvador	Phillip Salvador, Monica Herrera, Lani Lobangco, Efren Reyes, Zandro Zamora, Paquito Diaz, Robert Miller, Usman Hassim, Lucita Soriano, Renato del Prado, Joey Padilla	Action	LGB Productions
Isa Isahin Ko Kayo	Francis Jun Posadas	Alex Austero (Supervising Producer), Eddie Sy and Luis Sy (Executive Producer)	Ronnie Ricketts, Charlie Davao, Vivian Foz, John Regala, Big-Boy Gomez, Usman Hassim, Val Iglesias (as Val Iglesia)	Action	Harvest Films International
Alyas Pogi: Birador ng Nueva Ecija	Joey Del Rosario	Lani Mercado (as Jesusa Victoria Bautista)	Ramon "Bong" Revilla Jr., Janice de Belen, Edu Manzano, Johnny Delgado, Tommy Abuel, Bernard Bonnin, George Estregan Jr, Robert Talabis, Dick Israel, Rez Cortez, Bomber Moran, Edwin Reyes, Jimmy Reyes, Renato del Prado, Roldan Aquino	Action	Tagalog Ilang-Ilang Productions
Anak ni Baby Ama	Deo J. Fajardo Jr.	William C. Leary	Robin Padilla .... Anghel, Amy Perez .... Annie, Ilonah Jean .... Cora, Eva Darren .... Aida, Eddie Rodriguez .... Ramon Crisologo, Subas Herrero .... Johnny Roa, Romy Diaz, Val Iglesias (as Val Iglesia)	Action	Viva Films
Hotdog	Jose Wenceslao		Tito Sotto, Vic Sotto, Joey de Leon	Comedy	Regal Films
Kaaway ng Batas	Pepe Marcos	Victoria Fernandez	Rudy Fernandez, Edu Manzano, Efren Reyes Jr., Star Querubin, Ali Sotto, Gabby Concepcion, Mia Gutierre, Dencio Padilla, Zandro Zamora, Ernie David, Big Boy Gomez, Val Iglesias (as Val Iglesia), Polly Cadsawan, Robert Talabis, Rene Hawkins, Johnny Vicar	Action	Reflection Films
Hindi Ka Na Sisikatan ng Araw	Eddie Rodriguez	Susan Roces	Fernando Poe Jr., Monica Herrera, Eddie Garcia, Janno Gibbs, Romy Diaz, Danny Riel, Ernie David, Vic Belaro	Action	Viva Films
Ama...Bakit Mo Ako Pinabayaan?	Lino Brocka	Robbie Tan	Jestoni Alarcon, Gretchen Barretto, Sheryl Cruz, Ricky Belmonte, Robert Arevalo, Marita Zobel, Suzanne Gonzales, Jovit Moya	Drama, romance	Seiko Films
Baril Ko... ang Uusig!	Augusto Salvador	Emilia Santos Blas (Executive Producer)	Ronnie Ricketts, Eddie Garcia, Efren Reyes Jr., Michael de Mesa, Zandro Zamora, Val Iglesias (as Val Iglesia), Dencio Padilla, Zandro Zamora, Rommel Valdez, Big-Boy Gomez, Ernie David	Action	LEA Films
Shake, Rattle & Roll II	Peque Gallaga; Lore Reyes		Episode 1: "Multo" - Janice de Belen, Eric Quizon, Eddie Gutierrez, Isabel Granada; Episode 2: "Kulam" - Joey Marquez, Carmina Villarroel, Daisy Romualdez, Sylvia Sanchez; Episode 3: "Aswang" - Manilyn Reynes, Aljon Jimenez, Ana Roces, Anjo Yllana, Richard Gomez, Vangie Labalan, Rez Cortez	Horror	Regal Films
Hanggang Kailan Kita Papatay	Dante Pangilinan	Manolo Maglaya	Miguel Rodriguez, Monica Herrera, Sylvia Sanchez, Bernard Bonnin, Edu Manzano, Dindo Arroyo, Perla Bautista, Zandro Zamora, Danny Riel, Monsour del Rosario, Rex Lapid, Perla Bautista, Robert Miller, Usman Hassim, and Tony Bagyo	Action	Regal Films
Katabi Ko'y Mamaw	Mike Relon Makiling		Berting Labra, Donita Rose	Comedy, crime, fantasy	

== 1991 ==
Film	Director	Producer	Cast	Genre	Company
1991
Akin Ka... Magdusa Man Ako!	Laurice Guillen		Aga Muhlach, Gretchen Barretto, Rita Avila, Eric Quizon	Drama, romance	Seiko Films
Alyas Dodong Guwapo: Huling Kilabot ng Davao	Dante Javier; Rene Balan	Michael Tan	Jestoni Alarcon, Gretchen Barretto, Toby Alejar, Dan Fernandez, Alex Cunanan, Ernie David, Cris Aguilar, Zandro Zamora, Atong Redillas, Lily Madrigal, Honey Policarpio	Action	Seiko Films
Andrew Ford Medina Huwag Akong Gamol	Ben Feleo		Andrew E., Dennis Padilla, Nanette Medved, Cristina Gonzales	Comedy	Viva Films
Kidlat ng Maynila: Joe Pring 2	Augusto Salvador	Ramon Salvador	Phillip Salvador, Monsour del Rosario, Aurora Sevilla, Edu Manzano, Willie Revillame, Maritoni Fernandez, Tin-Tin Patelo, August Pascual, Met Enclona, Buddy Salvador	Action	Four n Films; Moviestars
Ang Totoong Buhay ni Pacita M.	Elwood Perez		Nora Aunor, Lotlot de Leon, Armida Siguion-Reyna, Juan Rodrigo, Marissa Delgado, Subas Herrero, Dexter Doria	Drama	MRN Film International
Angelito San Miguel at ang Mga Batang City Jail	Deo J. Fajardo Jr.		Raymart Santiago, Kier Legaspi, Keempee de Leon, Gary Estrada, Joko Diaz, Dante Rivero, Roi Vinzon, Rachel Alejandro, Charito Solis, Rommel Padilla	Action	Viva Films
Ang Utol Kong Hoodlum	Deo J. Fajardo Jr.	William C. Leary	Robin Padilla, Vina Morales, Dennis Padilla, Mark Gil, Gloria Diaz	Action, romance	Viva Films
Batas ng .45	Ronwaldo Reyes	Angie Yu-Pineda	Fernando Poe Jr., Timmy Cruz, Paquito Diaz, Charlie Davao, RR Herrera, Tito Arévalo, Bert Olivar, Kevin Delgado, Romeo Rivera	Action	Chiba Far East Film International
Bago Matapos ang Lahat	Joselito "Abbo" Q. dela Cruz		Gretchen Barretto, Rita Avila, Roselle Agana, Eric Quizon	Drama, romance	Seiko Films
Bingbong: The Vincent Crisologo Story	Romy Suzara		Rudy Fernandez, Charito Solis, Eddie Rodriguez, Kristine Garcia, King Gutierrez, Arnel Acuba, Vic Belaro, Charlie Davao	Action	FLT Films International
Buburahin Kita Sa Mundo!	Joey del Rosario	Jesse M. Ejercito	Richard Gomez, Maricel Laxa, Eddie Gutierrez, Subas Herrero, Kevin Delgado, Michael de Mesa, King Gutierrez, Robert Talabis, Paquito Diaz, Perla Bautista	Action	Good Harvest Unlimited
Bukas Tatakpan Ka ng Dyaryo!	Toto Natividad		Ian Veneracion, Gardo Versoza, Jon Hernandez, John Regala, George Estregan, Dick Israel, Tony Ferrer	Action	Seiko Films
A Case of Honor	Eddie Romero		Timothy Bottoms, John Phillip Law	Action	
Contreras Gang	Pepe Marcos		Edu Manzano, Cristina Gonzales, Johnny Delgado, Monsour del Rosario, Rez Cortez, Willie Revillame, Dindo Arroyo, Eric Fructuoso, Kevin Delgado	Action	Moviestars Production
Darna	Joel Lamangan	William Leary	Nanette Medved, Edu Manzano, Nida Blanca, Bing Loyzaga, Dennis Padilla, Atong Redillas, Pilar Pilapil, Tonton Gutierrez	Fantasy	VIVA Films
Emma Salazar Case	Jose Javier Reyes		Alice Dixson, Cristina Gonzales, Aiko Melendez, Ricardo Cepeda, Ricardo Cepeda, Gina Alajar	Crime	Good Harvest Unlimited
Hindi Palulupig	Jesus Jose	Luis Lao	Lito Lapid, Edu Manzano, Ramon Zamora, Juan Rodrigo, Bing Loyzaga, Roldan Aquino, Russel Almanzor, Robert Miller, Usman Hassim, King Gutierrez	Action	Bonanza Films
Boyong Manalac: Hoodlum Terminator	Eddie Rodriguez	William C. Leary	Eddie Garcia, Pinky De Leon, Maita Soriano, Subas Herrero, Edu Manzano, John Regala, Dick Israel, Manjo Del Mundo, Roi Vinzon, Paquito Diaz	Action	Viva Films
Ipaglaban Mo Ako, Boy Topak!	Manuel "Fyke" Cinco		Zoren Legaspi, Sheryl Cruz, Tony Ferrer, Ricardo Cepeda, Dick Israel, Ruel Vernal, Pilar Pilapil	Fantasy	Good Harvest Unlimited
Ganti ng Api	Marlon Bautista; Jose Balagtas		Ronnie Ricketts, Monsour del Rosario, Mariz, Tirso Cruz III, Eddie Rodriguez, Eric Cayetano, Jessie Delgado, Perla Bautista, Ronnie Lazaro, Conrad Poe	Action	Stelar Films
Goosebuster	Tony Y. Reyes		Joey de Leon, Aiza Seguerra, Racel Tuazon, Panchito, Ruby Rodriguez, Lady Lee, Bert Olivar, Gigi Posadas	Comedy	Regal Films
Hihintayin Kita sa Langit	Carlos Siguion-Reyna	Armida Siguion-Reyna	Dawn Zulueta, Richard Gomez	Romantic drama	Reyna Films
Ipagpatawad Mo	Laurice Guillen		Vilma Santos, Christopher de Leon, Charito Solis	Drama	VIVA Films
John en Marsha Ngayon '91	Luciano Carlos		Dolphy, Nida Blanca, Maricel Soriano	Comedy drama	RVQ Productions
Juan Tamad at Mister Shooli sa Mongolian Barbeque	Jun Urbano		Eric Quizon, Jun Urbano, Jackie Lou Blanco, Leo Martinez, Caridad Sanchez, Berting Labra, Lou Veloso	Comedy	FLT Films International
Kailan Ka Magiging Akin	Chito S. Roño	Charo Santos-Concio	Janice de Belen, Gabby Concepcion, Lady Lee, Vivian Velez, Eddie Gutierrez, Charo Santos-Concio, Carmina Villarroel, Julio Diaz, Gina Alajar	Crime thriller, melodrama	Vision Films
Leon ng Maynila: Lt. Co. Romeo B. Maganto	Joey Del Rosario	Jesse Ejercito	Ramon "Bong" Revilla Jr., Michael de Mesa, Vina Morales, Ricky Davao, Lara Melissa de Leon, Precious Tongco, King Gutierrez, ER Ejercito, Ernie David, Edwin Reyes	Action	RNB Films
Lt. Palagawad...Mag-uunahan ang Paa mo sa Hukay	Dante Pangilinan	Leleng Ubaldo Jr. (story, screenplay), Alex Panamblayan (story)	Chuck Perez, Efren Reyes Jr., Monica Herrera, Lani Lobangco, Daniel Fernando	Action	Regal Films
Kapitan Jaylo: Batas sa Batas, Walang Sinasanto	Pepe Marcos	Angie Yu-Pineda	Ramon "Bong" Revilla Jr., Raul Aragon, Robert Arevalo, Edu Manzano, Rez Cortez, Manjo Del Mundo, Tom Olivar, Edwin Reyes, Boy Sta. Maria, Tony Bagyo	Action	Omega Releasing Organization
Kumukulong Dugo	Augusto Salvador		Ronnie Ricketts, Edu Manzano, Cherry Pie Picache, Amy Perez, Eddie Gutierrez, Dick Israel, Bembol Roco, Ernie David, Val Iglesias (Credited as Val Iglesia), Jojo de Leon	Action	Viva Films
Mabuting Kaibigan, Masamang Kaaway	Augusto Salvador	EDL	Fernando Poe Jr., Vic Vargas, Marianne dela Riva, Subas Herrero, Paquito Diaz, Robert Ortega	Action	Tagalog Ilang-Ilang Productions
Magdalena S. Palacol Story	Junn Cabreira		Alma Moreno, Toby Alejar, Gardo Versoza, Allan Paule, Robert Arevalo, Orestes Ojeda, Alicia Alonzo	Action	Omega Releasing Organization
Maging Sino Ka Man	Eddie Rodriguez	William C. Leary	Sharon Cuneta, Robin Padilla, Edu Manzano, Vina Morales, Dennis Padilla, Dick Israel, Romeo Rivera, Manjo Del Mundo	Drama	Viva Films
Markhang Bungo: The Bobby Ortega Story	Nilo Saez	Hermie Go and Olivia M. Lamasan (Line Producers), Rory B Quintos (Supervising Producer), William Lao (Executive Producer)	Rudy Fernandez, Donita Rose, Vivian Foz, Dennis Roldan, Michael de Mesa, Dick Israel, Joey Padilla, King Gutierrez, Renato del Prado, Zandro Zamora, Val Iglesias (Credited as Val Iglesia) Production Designed by: Boy Tablizo, Music by: Jaime Fabregas, Cinematograpered by: Nonong Rasca "director of photography", Art Director: Joey Velilla, Theme Song: Dapat ako Ipagpatuloy Lyrics by: Chad Borja, Composed and Arranged by: Dingdong Avanzado, Sung by: Rudy Fernandez, Written by: Humilde "Meek" Roxas, Amado S. PAgsanjan, and Jose Bartolome, Edited by: Edgardo Vinarao	Action	Bonanza Films
Mayor Latigo: Ang Alkalde ng Batas	Jose N. Carreon	Vic Del Rosario Jr and Orly R. Ilacad (Executive Producers)	Eddie Garcia, Johnny Delgado, Jess Lapid Jr., and Rachel Lobangco	Action	Octoarts Films
Moro	Jose Mari Avellana	Lydia de Leon (Supervising Producer), Eduardo Flaminiano (Executive Producer)	Ricky Davao, Jackie Lou Blanco, Tommy Abuel, Dante Rivero (Released Date 22 May 1991)	Action	FLT Films International
Noel Juico 16: Batang Kriminal	Deo J. Fajardo Jr.		Raymart Santiago, Edu Manzano, Kier Legaspi, Roi Vinzon, Perla Bautista	Action	VIVA Films
Okay Ka, Fairy Ko!: The Movie	Bert de Leon; Tony Reyes		Vic Sotto, Tweetie De Leon, Aiza Seguerra	Fantasy	Regal Films
OXO vs Sigue-Sigue	Dante Pangilinan		George Estregan Jr., Sonny Parsons, Bebeng Amora, Rene Balan, Booby Benitez, Boy Bernal, Usman Hassim, Oca Reyes, Dick Israel	Historical action	Cine Suerte and Solar Films
Para Sayo Ang Huling Bala Ko	Toto Natividad	Lilly Moteverde (Executive Producer)	Richard Gomez, Louella De Cordova, Erra Espiritu, Subas Herrero, Ruel Vernal	Action	Regal Films
Pretty Boy Hoodlum	Joey Del Rosario		Zoren Legaspi, Edu Manzano, Maricel Laxa, Cristina Gonzales, Paquito Diaz	Action	Regal Films
Sagad Hanggang Buto	Jose Mari Avellana	Ramon Salvador (Supervising Producer), Victor Villegas (Executive Producer)	Ace Vergel, Cristina Gonzales, Edu Manzano, Efren Reyes Jr., Willie Revillame, Dindo Arroyo, Perla Bautista	Action	Moviestars Production
Shake, Rattle & Roll III	Peque Gallaga; Lore Reyes		Episode 1: "Yaya" -; Episode 2: "Ate" -; Episode 3: "Nanay" -	Horror	Good Harvest Unlimited
Sumayaw Ka Salome	Laurice Guillen		Rita Avila, Jestoni Alarcon, Cesar Montano, Barbara Perez, Daria Ramirez, Maritoni Fernandez	Erotic drama, romance	Seiko Films
Tukso, Layuan Mo Ako	Abbo Q. de la Cruz		Gretchen Barretto, Romnick Sarmenta, Jennifer Sevilla, Michael Locsin, Janet Arnaiz, Jojo Alejar, Jovit Moya, Mario J. Salcedo, Maritoni Fernandez	Drama, romance	Seiko Films
Ubos na ang Luha Ko	Mel Chionglo		Susan Roces, Gretchen Barretto, Sheryl Cruz, Romnick Sarmenta, Gardo Versoza	Drama, romance	Seiko Films

== 1992 ==
Film	Director	Producer	Cast	Genre	Company
1992
Aguila at Guerrero: Droga Terminators	Romy V. Suzara		Zaldy Zshornack, Ronnie Ricketts, Sharmaine Arnaiz, Ali Sotto, Robert Arevalo, Lito Legaspi, Bomber Moran, Robert Miller, Usman Hassim, Vic Belaro, Eric Francsico, Nonong de Andres (Date of Released: 24 June 1992) Music by: Jaime Fabregas	Action, drama	Stellar Films Filmstar, ABS-CBN Films
Alyas Boy Kano	Pepe Marcos		Edu Manzano, Maricel Laxa, Johnny Delgado, Tirso Cruz III, Alicia Alonzo, Robert Arevalo, King Gutierrez, Manjo Del Mundo, Berting Labra, Edwin Reyes, Bebeng Amora, Joey Padilla	Action	Regal Films
Amang Capulong-Anak ng Tondo II	Toto Natividad	Noel Nuqui	Monsour del Rosario, Rina Reyes, Johnny Delgado, Tirso Cruz III, Perla Bautista, Lucita Soriano, Ruel Vernal, Kevin Delgado, King Gutierrez, Mario Escudero, Edwin Reyes, Toby Alejar (Written by: Amado S. Pagsanjan Jun Lawas and Eddie Joson "story and screenplay") (Music by: Mon del Rosario) (Edited by: Ruben Natividad) (Sound Supervisor: Rolly Ruta) (Cinematographered by: Ambo Buatista)	Action	4 N Films
Alyas Ninong: Huling Kilabot ng Tondo	Jose N. Carreon		Eddie Garcia, Jennifer Mendoza, Charo Santos, Jeric Raval, Johnny Delgado, Mark Gil, Bomber Moran, Romy Diaz, and Ernie Forte	Action	OctoArts Films
Alyas Pogi 2	Toto Natividad		Ramon "Bong" Revilla Jr., Rita Avila, Charito Solis, Jay Ilagan, Michael de Mesa, Leo Martinez, Bernard Bonnin, Lani Lobangco, Subas Herrero, Max Alvarado	Action	Moviestars Production
Alyas Stella Magtanggol	Chito S. Roño		Rita Avila, Romnick Sarmenta, Maritoni Fernandez, Gardo Versoza, Vanessa Escano, Sylvia Sanchez, Lito Legaspi, Alicia Alonzo, Tony Mabesa, Dexter Doria, Ray Ventura	Erotic drama, romance	Seiko Films
Andres Manambit: Angkan ng Matatapang	Ike Jarlego Jr.		Eddie Garcia, Eddie Gutierrez, Pinky de Leon, Kier Legaspi, Joko Diaz, Mia Pratts, Ramon Christopher	Action	VIVA Films
Aswang	Peque Gallaga; Lore Reyes		Manilyn Reynes, Aiza Seguerra, Alma Moreno	Horror	Regal Films
Bad Boy 2	Ricardo Osorio		Robin Padilla, Monique Wilson, Dennis Padilla, Vic Vargas	Action	Viva Films
Bakit Ako Mahihiya?!	Romy Suarza		Gabby Concepcion, Gretchen Barretto, Eddie Rodriguez, Pilar Pilapil, Lani Lobangco, Bong Regala, Manny Castañeda		Regal Films
Bakit Labis Kitang Mahal	Jose Javier Reyes		Aga Muhlach, Ariel Rivera and Lea Salonga	Drama, romance	OctoArts Films
Bayani	Raymond Red	Christoph Janetzko	Raymond Alsona, Grace Amilbangsa, John Arcilla, Raul Arellano, Connie Lauigan-Chua, Julio Diaz, Ronnie Lazaro, Pen Medina, Julien Mendoza	Historical drama	
Big Boy Bato: Kilabot ng Kankaloo	Marlon Bautista	Jesse Ejercito	Chuck Perez, Cristina Gonzales, Rachel Lobangco, Bernard Bonnin, Dick Israel, Dindo Arroyo, Johnny Vicar Music by: Demet Velasquez, Film Edited by: Rogelio Salvador, Production Designed by: Rome Gonzales and Linio Gabriel, Cinematographered by: Ely Cruz and Vic Anao, Assistant Director: Daniel Martin, Written by: Humilde Meek Roxas and Jun Sto. Domingo	Action	Regal Films
Blue Jeans Gang	Deo J. Fajardo Jr.		JoJo Diaz, Kier Legaspi, Gary Estrada, Keempee de Leon, Dennis Padilla, Rachel Alejandro, Almira Muhlach, Paquito Diaz, Rommel Padilla, Alicia Alonzo, Tom Alvarez, Dencio Padilla, Marco Polo Garcia	Action	Viva Films
Boboy Salonga: Batang Tondo	Junn P. Cabreira	Simon C. Ongpin	Jeric Raval, Monica Herrera, Vic Vargas, Mark Gil, Rina Reyes, Francis Magalona, Jennifer Mendoza, Ronel Victor, Ali Sotto, Dick Israel	Action	OctoArts Films
Boy Recto	Jett Espiritu		Ronnie Ricketts, Aiko Melendez, Jess Lapid Jr., Michael de Mesa, Bembol Roco, Zandro Zamora	Action	Moviestars Production
Canary Brothers ng Tondo	Leonardo 'Ding' Pascual		Jestoni Alarcon, Ricky Davao, Rey "PJ" Abellana, Ricky Belmonte, Patrick dela Rosa, Juan Rodrigo, Mario J. Salcedo, Ilonah Jean, Vanessa Escano, Ana Margarita Gonzales	Historical action	Seiko Films
Cordora: Lulutang Ka sa Sarili Mong Dugo	Francis "Jun" Posadas	Rosita Go, Willy Chua	Eddie Garcia, Daniel Fernando, Roi Vinzon, Roy Alvarez, Tessie Tomas, Fred Montilla, Roberto Talabis, Zandro Zamora, Erra Espiritu	Action	First Films
Dito sa Pitong Gatang	Pablo Santiago		Fernando Poe Jr., Nanette Medved, Paquito Diaz	Action, comedy	FPJ Productions
Engkanto	Tata Esteban		Janice de Belen, Francis Magalona, Raul Zaragosa, Maila Gumila, Emon Ramos, Apple Pie Bautista, Suisan Lozada, Cita Astals, Roderick Paulate	Action, horror	Double M Films
Dudurugin Kita ng Bala Ko	Toto Natividad	Manolo Maglaya	Lito Lapid .... Reden Verdadero, Maricel Laxa, Bernard Bonnin, Roi Vinzon, Ramon Zamora, Rosemarie Gil, Alicia Alonzo, Eric Lorenzo, Roldan Aquino, Conrad Poe, King Gutierrez (Date of Released: 22 July 1992)	Action	Regal Films
Eh, Kasi Bata	Efren Jarlego		Gretchen Barretto, Romnick Sarmenta, Jennifer Sevilla, Billy Joe Crawford, Atong Redillas, Cesar Montano	Science fiction comedy	Seiko Films
Emong Verdadero: Tatak ng Cebu II (Bala ng Ganti)	Toto Natividad	Luis Lao	Ferdinand Galang, Jackie Lou Blanco, Cathy Mora, Johnny Delgado, Richard Bonnin, Jessie Delgado, Mark Gil, Pocholo Montes, Alicia Alonzo, Marita Zobel, Conrad Poe, Ruel Vernal, Jose Romulo, Vic Belaro, Eddie Tuazon, King Gutierrez, Edwin Reyes, Joel Torre	Action	Bonanza Films
Grease Gun Gang	Eddie Rodriguez	William Leary	Robin Padilla .... Carding Sungkit, Dennis Padilla .... Ponyong Libog, Bing Loyzaga .... Theresa, Michael de Mesa .... Victor Lim, Roi Vinzon .... Julio, Bert Olivar .... Ka Lando, Dexter Doria .... Mrs. Lee, Ruben Rustia .... Mr. Lee, Val Iglesias .... Julio's Right in Man, Vic Belaro .... Julio's Men, Joey Padilla .... Julio's Men, Jessie Delgado .... Victor Lim's Man, June Hidalgo .... Bertong Hika (as Jun Hidalgo), July Hidalgo .... Julio's Men, Eddie Tuazon .... Julio's Men, Ruel Vernal .... Kapitan Laconico, Bernard Atienza .... Julio's Man, Richard Sicangco .... Victor Lim's Man (as Li Chard Sicangco), Cesar Iglesia .... Julio's Men (as Cesar Iglesias), Joselito Castro .... Mr. Lee's Organization, Cherry Acorda Cancino .... Motel's Hotter (Date of Released: 25 March 1992) (Cinematographer by: Vic Anao) (Music by: Jaime Fabregas and Nonong Buencamino) (Edited by: Marya Ignacio) (Sound supervisor: Vic Macamay Sound Effects: Ramon Reyes Amber Ramos) (Stunt and Fight Director: Val Iglesias (as Val Iglesia))	Action	Viva Films
Gobernador	Romy Suzara	Rory B. Quintos	Eddie Garcia, Pinky de Leon, Dante Rivero, Charlie Davao, Bomber Moran, Rez Cortez; Music by Jaime Fabregas, Production Designed by Apo Manansala, Film Edited by Edgardo (Boy Vinarao), Cinematographered by Max Dela Pena	Action	Stellar Films
Hanggang May Buhay	Pepe Marcos		Ramon "Bong" Revilla Jr., Dawn Zulueta, Carmina Villarroel, Johnny Delgado, Roi Vinzon, Roy Alvarez R.I.P., Marco "Polo" Garcia, Kevin Delgado, Manjo Del Mundo, Tom Olivar, Jimmy Reyes, Rez Cortez, Roland Montes, Charlie Davao, Lito Legaspi, Zandro Zamora, Tony Bernal, Fred Moro, Bebeng Amora, Mia Gutierrez, Vivian Foz (Special Participation); Theme Song: HANGGANG MAY BUHAY, Lyrics by: Magnum Jun Garlan, Composed by: Dingdong Avanzado, Arranged by: Vehnee Saturno, Sung by: Basil Valdez, Film Edited by Juancho Zafra, Stunt Director: Baldo Marro, Production Designed by: Apo Manansala, Art Director: Joey Velilla, Written by: Amado S. Pagsanjan, Humilde (Meek) Roxas, Jose Bartolome, and Eddie Joson, Music by: Vehnee Saturno, Sound Supervisors: Gaudencio Barredo and Rolly Ruta	Action	Bonanza Films
Hiram na Mukha	Joel Lamangan		Nanette Medved, Christopher de Leon, Cesar Montano	Drama	Viva Films
Iisa Pa Lamang	Jose Javier Reyes		Richard Gomez, Dawn Zulueta, Maricel Laxa	Drama	Regal Films
Jerry Marasigan, WPD	Augusto Salvador		Jestoni Alarcon, Gretchen Barretto, John Regala, Patrick dela Rosa, Toby Alejar, Michael de Mesa, Leo Martinez, Jimmy Fabregas, Joboy Gomez	Action	Seiko Films
Jesus Dela Cruz at Ang Mga Batang Riles	Deo J. Fajardo Jr.		Joko Diaz, Kier Legaspi, Gary Estrada, Keempee de Leon, Dennis Padilla, Ogie Alcasid, Roi Vinzon, Ana Roces, Lea Orosa, Julio Diaz, Kate Gomez, Subas Herrero, Raymart Santiago, Berting Labra, Jordan Castillo, Ricky Calderon, Ernie Zarate, Cris Daluz	Action	Viva Films
Kahit Buhay Ko	Jose N. Carreon		Rudy Fernandez .... Marco, Tirso Cruz III, Ruffa Gutierrez, Rina Reyes, Johnny Delgado, Roi Vinzon, Michael de Mesa, Zandro Zamora, Val Iglesias (as Val Iglesia), Ernie David, Cesar Iglesia, King Gutierrez .... Benjamin Batumbakal, Rez Cortez, Polly Cadsawan, Flora Gasser, Jimmy Reyes, Joey Padilla, Jose Romulo, Danny Riel, Rey Solo (Music by: Jaime Fabregas) (Sound Supervisor: Rolly Ruta) (Cinematographered by: Ricardo Remias)	Action	Reflection Films
Kamay ng Cain	Jose N. Carreon		Rudy Fernandez .... Carding, Alice Dixson, Aiko Melendez, Dante Rivero, Johnny Delgado, Edu Manzano, Charlie Davao, Bomber Moran, Romy Diaz, Ernie David, Zandro Zamora, Manjo Del Mundo, Val Iglesias (as Val Iglesia), Rez Cortez, Danny Riel, Flora Gasser, Jimmy Reyes, Joey Padilla, Jose Romulo, Ernie Forte, Rey Solo	Action	Reflection Films
Kanto Boy: Alyas Totoy Guwapo	Toto Natividad		Ace Vergel, Aurora Sevilla, Sheila Ysrael, Efren Reyes Jr., Johnny Delgado, Bembol Roco, Eric Lorenzo, Atong Redillas, Janus del Prado, Sunshine Dizon, Ruel Vernal, King Gutierrez, Ernie David, Renato del Prado, Roldan Aquino	Action	Moviestars Production
Lacson: Batas ng Navotas	Leonardo Pascual	Manolo Maglaya	Lito Lapid .... Narcing Lacson, Snooky Serna, Cristina Gonzales, Miguel Rodriguez, Dick Israel, Patrick Dela Rosa	Action	Regal Films
Lakay	Nilo Saez		Fernando Poe Jr., Ernie David, Charo Santos, Rina Reyes, Efren Reyes Jr., Jose Romulo, Philip Gamboa, Romy Diaz, Madel Locsin, Flexi Sarte, Fredmoore De Los Santos	Action	GP Films
Lucio Margallo	Augusto Salvador		Phillip Salvador, Miguel Rodriguez, Jean Garcia, Paquito Diaz, Max Laurel, Tirso Cruz III, Bunny Paras, Dencio Padilla, Edwin Reyes	Action	Moviestars Production
Lumayo Ka Man sa Akin	Laurice Guillen		Richard Gomez, Gretchen Barretto, Jess Lapid Jr., Johnny Delgado, Gardo Versoza, Jovit Moya, Mario J. Salcedo, Daria Ramirez	Drama, romance	Seiko Films
Magdaleno Orbos: Sa Kuko ng Mga Lawin	Jose Balagtas		Eddie Garcia, Eddie Gutierrez, Charlie Davao, Star Querubin, Sheila Ysrael, Ilonah Jean, Nick Romano, Dick Israel, Gabriel Romulo, Jessie Delgado	Action	Harvest International Films Corporation
Mandurugas	Eddie Rodriguez	William Leary	Dennis Padilla, Eddie Gutierrez, Janno Gibbs, Roi Vinzon, Daniel Fernando, Donita Rose, Lea Orosa, Mia Pratts, Atong Redillas, I.C. Mendoza	Action	Viva Films
Manong Gang: Ang Kilabot at Maganda	Romy V. Suzara; Teddy Page (as Tedmund)		Ramon "Bong" Revilla Jr, Dina Bonnevie, Dennis Roldan, Subas Herrero, Paquito Diaz, Dick Israel, Ernie Forte, Robert Miller, Usman Hassim, Cris Aguilar, Manjo del Mundo, Edwin Reyes, Jessie Delgado, Berting Labra, Max Alvarado, Bert Olivar, Vic Varrion, Eric Francisco, Vic Belaro, Lucita Soriano, Lito Anzures, Ryan Redillas (as Atong Redillas), Joe Ron, Edward Salvador, Mike Magat, Nonong de Andres (Date of Released: 20 May 1992) Music by: Jaime Fabregas, Film edited by: Edgardo Vinarao	Action, drama	Moviestars Production
Miss Na Miss Kita (Utol Kong Hoodlum II)	Deo J. Fajardo Jr.		Robin Padilla, Vina Morales, Kier Legaspi, Dennis Padilla, Subas Herrero	Action, drama	Viva Films
Mukhang Bungo: Da Coconut Nut	Felix E. Dalay		Redford White, Shiela Ysrael, Willie Revillame, Dindo Arroyo, Berting Labra, Ruben Rustia, Gilda Aragon, Ernie Zarate, Moody Diaz, Cris Daluz	Action, comedy	Moviestars Production
Nang Gabing Mamulat si Eba (Jennifer Segovia Story)	Abbo Q. de la Cruz		Rita Avila, Cristina Gonzales, Rina Reyes, Rey Abellana, Gardo Versoza, Janet Arnaiz, Marita Zobel, Noel Trinidad, Susan Africa	Erotic drama, romance	Viva Films
Ngayon at Kailanman	Joel Lamangan		Sharon Cuneta, Richard Gomez	Drama	Viva Films
Okay Ka, Fairy Ko!: Part 2	Tony Y. Reyes		Vic Sotto, Aiza Seguerra, Tweetie de Leon, Tetchie Agbayani, Ruby Rodriguez, Jinky Oda, Bayani Casimiro Jr., Charito Solis	Comedy, family, fantasy	Regal Films and M-Zet Productions
Pacifico Guevarra: Dilingier	Pepe Marcos		Raymart Santiago, Joko Diaz, Johnny Delgado, Roi Vinzon	Action	Viva Films
Paminsan-Minsan	Dante Javier		Gretchen Barretto, Gardo Versoza, Mark Gil, Sylvia Sanchez	Action, drama	Seiko Films
Pangako Sa'yo	Pepe Marcos		Sharon Cuneta, Bong Revilla, Edu Manzano	Action	Viva Films
Pat. Omar Abdullah: Pulis Probinsiya	Jose Balagtas		Phillip Salvador .... Pat. Omar Abdullah, Donita Rose, Eddie Gutierrez, Vic Vargas, Dindo Arroyo, Ruel Vernal, Willie Revillame, Atoy Co, Joey Padilla, Johnny Vicar Music by: Mon del Rosario, Production Designed by: Noel Luna, Written by: Humilde "Meek" Roxas and Joji Vitug (Date of Released: 12 August 1992)	Action	Moviestars Production
Patayin si Billy Zapanta	Joey Del Rosario	Angie Yu Pineda	Ricky Davao Cristina Gonzales, Cherry Pie Picache, Johnny Delgado, Al Tantay, Bembol Roco, Dindo Arroyo, Edgar Mande	Action	Omega Releasing Organization
Sana Kahit Minsan	Abbo De La Cruz		Cristina Gonzales, Rey Abellana, Rina Reyes, Gardo Versoza	Drama, romance, erotic	Seiko Films
Sgt. Ernesto Baliola: Tinik sa Batas	Ricardo "Bebong" Osorio	Ramon Salvador	Sonny Parsons, Efren Reyes, Aurora Sevilla, Dindo Arroyo, Shirley Tesoro, Eric Francisco, Oliver Osorio, Gilda Aragon, Fred Moro, Joey Padilla	Action	Moviestars Production
Shake, Rattle & Roll IV	Peque Gallaga; Lore Reyes		Episode 1: "Guro" - Manilyn Reynes, Edu Manzano, Sunshine Cruz, Aljon Jimenez and Nida Blanca; Episode 2: "Kapitbahay" - Aiza Seguerra, Janice de Belen, Al Tantay and Lady Lee; Episode 3: "Madre" - Gina Alajar, Aiko Melendez, Miguel Rodriguez, Ai Ai delas Alas, IC Mendoza, Bella Flores, Lilia Cuntapay	Horror	Regal Films
Shotgun Banjo	Joey Del Rosario		Zoren Legaspi, Ruffa Gutierrez, Paquito Diaz, Jess Lapid Jr.	Action	Regal Films
Ang Siga at ang Sosyal	Toto Natividad		Richard Gomez, Kris Aquino, Anjo Yllana, Erra Espiritu a.k.a. Eric Lorenzo	Action, drama	Regal Films
Takbo... Talon... Tili!!!	Efren Jarlego		Rene Requiestas, Rita Avila, Raymond Gutierrez, Richard Gutierrez, Sheryl Cruz & Romnick Sarmenta	Comedy, fantasy, horror	Seiko Films
Tondo (Libingan ng Mga Siga)	Toto Natividad		John Regala, Efren Reyes, Sheila Ysrael, Jessica Rodriguez, Dan Fernandez, Subas Herrero, Raymond Bagatsing, King Gutierrez, Rez Cortez (Written by Amado S. Pagsanjan Jun Lawas and Eddie Joson "story and screenplay") (Music by: Mon del Rosario) (Edited by: Ruben Natividad) (Sound Supervisor: Gaudencio Barredo) (Cinematographered by: Ambo Bautista)	Action	Moviestars Production
Turing Gesmundo, Kapitan Langgam	Robert Talby		Sonny Parsons, Vic Vargas, Rhey Roldan, Bobby Benitez	Action, drama	ATB-4 Films

== 1993 ==
Film	Director	Producer	Cast	Genre	Company
1993
Aguinaldo: Agila ng Cagayan	William G. Mayo		Lito Lapid, Aiko Melendez, Sunshine Cruz, Jess Lapid Jr., Lito Legaspi, Luis Gonzales	Action	Regal Films
Alyas Waway (Leonardo Delos Reyes)	Toto Natividad	Edgar Abanilla and Elma Medua (Associate Producers), Ramon Salvador (Supervising Producer)	Cesar Montano, Joel Torre, Jun Aristorenas, Cristina Gonzales, Rey Ventura, Edgar Mande, Usman Hassim, Doming Olivar, Ruel Vernal, Rene Hawkins, Bembol Roco, and Roldan Aquino	Action	Moviestars Production
Anak ng Pasig	Pablo Santiago		Raymart Santiago, Tetchie Agbayani, Geneva Cruz, Johnny Delgado, Mark Gil, Vic Vargas, Celeste Legaspi	Action	FLT Films International
Ako Ang Katarungan (Lt. Napoleon Guevarra)	Pepe Marcos	Ramon "Bong" Revilla Jr. (Line Producer) (as Jose Mikael Mortel Bautista), Robbie Tan (Executive Producer) (Date of Released: 27 October 1993)	Ramon "Bong" Revilla Jr., Gretchen Barretto, Sharmaine Arnaiz, Perla Bautista, Eva Darren, Matt Ranillo III, Roldan Aquino, King Gutierrez, Edwin Reyes, Tom Olivar, Ernie Forte, Usman Hassim, Robert Miller, Zandro Zamora	Action	Seiko Films
Ano Ba 'Yan 2	Tony Y. Reyes		Vic Sotto Ritchie D' Horsie, Sunshine Cruz, Roldan Aquino, Yoyong Martirez, Francis Magalona, Michael V. Ogie Alcasid, Kim Delos Santos, Danny Labra, Babalu	Comedy	OctoArts Films
Astig	Jun Aristorenas		Dennis Padilla, Janno Gibbs, Gelli de Belen, Leah Orosa, Teroy de Guzman Jr., Ernie David	Action, comedy	Viva Films
Beloy Montemayor Jr.: Tirador Ng Cebu	Junn P. Cabreira		Jeric Raval, Charito Solis, Vic Vargas, Janet Arnaiz, Tirso Cruz III, Vic Belaro	Action	OctoArts Films
Buenaventura Daang: Bad Boys Gang	Jerry O. Tirazona	Edgar Abanilla and Elma Medua (Associate Producers), Ramon Salvador (Supervising Producer)	Raymond Bagatsing, Miguel Rodriguez, Janet Arnaiz, Ruel Vernal, Niño Muhlach, Mike Magat	Action	Moviestars Production
Dagul	Cesar Abella		Baldo Marro, Berting Labra, Bob Soler, Danny Riel	Action	El Niño Films
Di Na Natuto	Eddie Rodriguez		Robin Padilla, Sharon Cuneta, Nida Blanca, Niño Muhlach, Edu Manzano	Action	Viva Films
Dino... Abangan Ang Susunod Na...	Joey Marquez		Anjo Yllana, Joey Marquez, William Martinez, Aiko Melendez, Tessie Tomas, Noel Trinidad, Eric Cayetano	Comedy	Regal Films
Disgrasyada	Mel Chionglo		Ruffa Gutierrez, Zoren Legaspi, Ricardo Cepeda, Maritoni Fernandez	Drama	Regal Films
Divine Mercy sa Buhay ni Sister Faustina	Ben Yalung (as Ben G. Yalung M7)	Rene G. Yalung (supervising producer); Pura Joaquin (supervising producer); Jings De Guzman (producer); Romy G. Yalung (producer) (as Romy Yalung); Ben Yalung (executive producer) (as Ben G. Yalung); Don De Castro (executive producer)	Christopher de Leon, Donita Rose	Drama, historical	Cine Suerte
Dodong Armado	Deo J. Fajardo Jr.	Carlo J. Caparas (Producer)	Raymart Santiago, Michael Rivero, Kier Legaspi, Mark Gil, Dante Rivero, Efren Reyes Jr., Ace Cruz, Bing Loyzaga, Renato del Prado, Tony Daya, Manjo Del Mundo, Ace Espinosa, Dexter Doria, Lucita Soriano	Action	Viva Films
Dugo ng Panday	Peque Gallaga; Lore Reyes	Madeleine Gallaga	Ramon 'Bong' Revilla Jr., Edu Manzano, Leo Martinez, Max Alvarado, IC Mendoza, Aiko Melendez	Action, adventure, fantasy	Regal Films
Dunkin Donato	Felix E. Dalay		Herbert Bautista, Benjie Paras, Ruffa Gutierrez, Edgar Mortiz, Atoy Co, Dindo Arroyo, Don Umali, Bunny Paras	Comedy, sport	Moviestars Production
Home Along Da Riles: The Movie	Johnny Manahan		Dolphy, Nova Villa	Comedy	Star Cinema
Galvez: Hanggang sa Dulo ng Mundo Hahanapin Kita	Manuel "Fyke" Cinco		Eddie Garcia, Edu Manzano, Cristina Gonzales, Pilar Pilapil, Jaime Fabregas, Berting Labra, Dick Israel, Sunshine Cruz	Action	Regal Films
Humanda Ka Mayor! Bahala Na ang Diyos	Carlo J. Caparas		Aga Muhlach, Nida Blanca, Luis Gonzales, Kris Aquino	Action, crime, drama	Regal Films & Golden Lions Films
Ikaw	Joel Lamangan		Sharon Cuneta, Ariel Rivera, Monique Wilson, Rustom Padilla, Ana Roces, Liza Lorena, Patrick Guzman	Romance	Viva Films
Ikaw Lang	Dante Pangilinan	Edgar Abanilla and Elma Medua (Associate Producers), Ramon Salvador (Supervising Producer), Wally Chua and Victor Villegas (Executive Producers)	Vilma Santos ..... Selina, Roniie Ricketts .... Dalton, Cesar Montano .... Andrew, Janine Barredo .... Tess, Dencio Padilla .... Ka-Erning, Roldan Aquino, Mike Magat, and Cris Daluz	Action, drama	Moviestars Production
Inay	Artemio Marquez	Melanie Marquez	Nora Aunor, Tirso Cruz III, Melanie Marquez, Chanda Romero, Tommy Abuel, Jaclyn Jose	Drama	
Isang Linggong Pag-ibig	Emmanuel H. Borlaza and Romeo Vitug		Gardo Versoza, Gretchen Barretto, Julio Diaz, Isabel Rivas, Chanda Romero, Sylvia Sanchez, Richard Reynoso	Erotic drama, romance	Seiko Films
Kahit May Mahal Ka Nang Iba	Jose Francisco		Albert Marinez, Cristina Gonzales, Charito Solis, Janine Barredo, Karla Estrada	Drama, romance	Reyna Films
Kailangan Kita	Carlos Siguion-Reyna	Armida Siguion-Reyna; Lily Y. Monteverde	Gabby Concepcion, Gretchen Barretto, Edu Manzano, Cristina Gonzales, Eddie Gutierrez	Drama, romance	Reyna Films
Magkasangga sa Batas	Phillip Ko		Edu Manzano, Cynthia Luster, Stella Mari, Charlie Davao, Monsour Del Rosario, Sheila Ysrael, Lovely Rivero, Johnny Wilson, Paolo Contis, Marita Zobel, Rachel Lobangco, Lani Lobangco	Action	Harvest International Films
Makati Ave., Office Girls	Jose Javier Reyes		Alma Moreno, Maricel Laxa, Carmina Villarroel, Chanda Romero, Cherrie Pie Picache, Karla Estrada, Miguel Rodriguez, William Martinez, Eric Fructuoso, Al Tantay, John Estrada, Nonie Mauricio	Drama	Regal Films
Makuha Ka Sa Tingin Kung Pwede Lang	Deo J. Fajardo Jr.		Robin Padilla, Dennis Padilla, Gelli de Belen	Action	Viva Films
Mama's Boys: Mga Praning-Ning	Junn P. Cabreira; Tony Y. Reyes		Michael V., Anjo Yllana, Ogie Alcasid, Ike Lozada, Babalu, Tessie Tomas, Gary Lising	Comedy	OctoArts Films
Manchichiritchit	Ben Feleo		Maricel Soriano, Andrew E., Donna Cruz	Comedy	Viva Films
Manila Boy	Arturo San Agustin	Charo Santos-Concio (Executive Producer)	Robin Padilla, Aurora Sevilla, Tony Ferrer, Paquito Diaz, Romy Diaz, Val Iglesias (as Val Iglesia), Bomber Moran, Zandro Zamora, Ernie David, June Hidalgo (as Jun Hidalgo), July Hidalgo, Robert Miller	Action	Pioneer Films
Maricris Sioson, Japayuki	Joey Romero		Ruffa Gutierrez, Janice de Belen, Joel Torre, Isabel Rivas, John Estrada, Karla Estrada, Cheska Diaz, Monsour del Rosario	Drama	Regal Films
Masahol Pa Sa Hayop	Augusto Salvador	Noel Nuqui (Associate Producer), Ramon Salvador (Producer), Manuel M. Nuqui (Executive Producer)	Phillip Salvador .... Capt. Tomas Padilla, Jun Aristorenas Gen. Maurino Montalban, Jessica Rodriguez, Aogt Isidro, Willie Revillame, Atoy Co, Efren Reyes Jr., Terrence Baylon, Dencio Padilla, Ernie Forte, Vic Velaro, Rando Almanzor, Roger Moring, Gerry Roman, Ruel Vernal, Polly Cadsawan, and Rene Hawkins	Action	Four N Films
Isa Lang Ang Buhay Mo!: Sarhento Bobby Aguilar	Wilfredo Milan	Willy Chua (Producer), Eddie Chua and Roy Chua (Executive Producer)	Ian Veneracion, Sunshine Cruz, Tirso Cruz III, Brando Legaspi, Ronaldo Valdez, George Estregan Jr, Roy Alvarez, Maritoni Fernandez, Erra Espiritu	Action	First Films
May Minamahal	Jose Javier Reyes		Aga Muhlach, Aiko Melendez	Drama	Star Cinema
Paminsan-Minsan	Dante Javier		Gretchen Barretto, Gardo Versoza, Mark Gil, Sylvia Sanchez, Mario J. Salcedo, Perla Bautista	Drama, romance	Seiko Films
Parañaque Bank Robbery: The Joselito Joseco Story	Angel Lopez		Gary Estrada, Donita Rose, Jean Garcia	Action	Viva Films
Pandoy: Alalay ng Panday	Tony Y. Reyes		Joey de Leon, Mariz Ricketts, Sharmaine Arnaiz	Action, comedy, fantasy	Moviestars Productions
Pita: Terror ng Caloocan	Jose Balagtas		Raymart Santiago	Action	Viva Films
Pugoy – Hostage: Davao	Francis "Jun" Posadas	Rosita Chua, William Chua, Rosita Go	Ian Veneracion, Lito Legaspi, Mark Gil, Roy Alvarez, Dick Israel, Patrick Dela Rosa, Juan Rodrigo, Rando Almanzor, Banjo Romero, Brando Legaspi	Action	First Film
Pulis Patola	Mike Relon Makiling		Anjo Yllana, Gretchen Barretto, Gloria Romero	Comedy	Seiko Films
Adan Ronquillo: Tubong Cavite, Laking Tondo	Joey del Rosario		actors Ramon "Bong" Revilla, Jr., Sheryl Cruz, and Miguel Rodriguez	Action	Star Cinema & Regal Films
Sakay	Raymond Red	Ana Marie Datuin	Julio Diaz, Tetchie Agbayani, Leopoldo Salcedo, Nanding Josef, Karlo Altomonte, Pen Medina, Ray Ventura, Raymond Keannu, Mike Lloren, John Arcilla	Historical drama	Alpha Omega Productions, Zeta Enterprises
Secret Love	Edgardo Vinarao		Geneva Cru, Jomari Yllana, Eddie Gutierrez	Drama, music, romance	FLT Films International
Task Force Habagat	Romy V. Suzara		Edu Manzano, Paquito Diaz, Bomber Moran, Jing Abalos, Emily Loren, Edgar Mande, Monica Herrera, Nikki Martel, Dexter Doria, Romy Romulo	Action	J & R Films; Bonanza Films
Tikboy Tikas at mga Khroaks Boys	Willy Milan		Zoren Legaspi, Tessie Tomas, Stella Mari, Jenny Roa, Raymond Bagatsing, Subas Herrero, Mark Gil, Lito Legaspi, Smokey Manaloto, Roy Alvarez, Juan Rodrigo, Orestes Ojeda	Action, drama	First Films
Tony Bagyo: Daig Pa ang Asong Ulol	Dante Javier		John Regala, Rita Avila, Michael de Mesa, Dick Israel, Tony Bagyo	Action	Seiko Films
Victor Meneses: Dugong Kriminal	Jose N. Carreon		Jeric Raval, Jun Aristorenas, Roldan Aquino, Rez Cortez, Bomber Moran, Boy Roque, Ernie Forte	Action	OctoArts Films
The Vizconde Massacre: God, Help Us!	Carlo J. Caparas		Romeo Vasquez, Aurora Salve, Lady Lee, Kris Aquino, John Regala	Crime, drama	Golden Lions Films

== 1994 ==
Film	Director	Producer	Cast	Genre	Company
1994
Alyas Totoy, Kamay na Bakal ng WPD	Pepe Marcos		Jestoni Alarcon, Gretchen Barretto, Johnny Delgado, Zandro Zamora, Karla Estrada, Lovely Rivero	Action	Seiko Films
Binibini ng Aking Panaginip	Joey Romero		Ruffa Gutierrez, Jayvee Gayoso, Eddie Rodriguez, Liza Lorena, Chanda Romero, John Estrada, Mark Anthony Fernandez	Drama, romance	Regal Films
Biboy Banal: Pagganti Ko, Tapos Kayo	Junn P. Cabreira		Jeric Raval, Jennifer Mendoza	Action, comedy	Viva Films and OctoArts Films
Bratpack: Pambayad Atraso	Deo J. Fajardo Jr.		Michael Rivero, Gary Estrada, Joko Diaz, Joemar Cruz, Ace Espinosa, Rustom Padilla, Dante Rivero, Mark Gil, Bing Loyzaga, Daniel Fernando, Anjanette Abayari, Kate Gomez, Ace Cruz, Banjo Romero, Michael Angelo, Boy Salvador, King Gutierrez, Anthony Roxas, Harvey Gomez, Anthony Wilson, Dan Fernandez, Maricel Morales, Jay Manalo, Isko Moreno, Rocky Gutierrez, Mike Moreno, Louie Rivera, Dexter Doria, Philip Gamboa, Daria Ramirez, Pocholo Montes, Vangie Labalan, Jon Hernandez, Ike Lozada, Tony Mabesa	Action	Viva Films
Capt. Jack Nayra: Alas ng Makati Police	Ely Perez		Cesar Rizon, Rando Almanzor, Jordan Castillo, Patrick Dela Rosa, Vic Felipe, Usman Hassim, Jess Lapid Jr., Max Laurel, Susan Lozada	Action	Rizon Films
Chop-Chop Lady: The Elsa Castillo Story	Edgardo Vinarao		Mat Ranillo III, Mark Gil, Amy Austria, Lorna Tolentino	Crime, drama	FLT Films International
Col. Billy Bibit, RAM	William Mayo		Rommel Padilla, Daniel Fernando, Paquito Diaz, Efren Reyes Jr., Jorge Estregan, Bing Loyzaga, Tonton Gutierrez, Dan Alvaro, Roi Vinzon, Jun Aristorenas, Robin Padilla, Dante Rivero, Lito Legaspi, Conrad Poe, Orestes Ojeda, Pen Medina	Action	Viva Films
Deo Dador: Berdugo ng Munti	Mike Relon Makiling	Jaime Fabregas (Musical Director), Jose Yu (Executive Producer), Charlie Davao (Associate Producer), Johnny Ramirez (Associate Director)	Ricky Davao, Sharmaine Arnaiz, Rez Cortez, Tirso Cruz III, Michael de Mesa, Paquito Diaz, Johnny Delgado, Eddie Rodriguez, Eddie Gutierrez, Jess Lapid Jr., Gabriel Romulo, Rando Almanzor, Ace Espinosa, Chinkee Tan, Berting Labra, Manjo del Mundo, Jim Rosales, Tsing Tsong Tai, Joe Yamashita, Jimmy Ko, Johnny Vicar, Ernie David, Jordan Castillo, Jimmy Reyes, Romy Blanco, Eddie Pajarillo, Eddie del Mar Jr., Supported by: Handing Fernandez, Mike Vergel, Bert Mansueto, Johnny Wood, Johnny Ramirez, Junn Romero, Joe Baltazar, Rudy Lapid, Telly Babasa, Jerry Corpuz, Al Nangka, Emeng Barcelona, Oscar Reyes, Lito Acuna, Bobby Orio, Bernard Atienza, Boy Sta. Maria, Lito Nunez, Czar Hizon, Joe Hardi, Harry Sagmaqueen, Mikel P Makiling, Ponz de Guzman, Julie Julieta	Action, drama	Harvest International Films Corporation
Eat All You Can	Mike Relon Makiling		Jimmy Santos, Claudine Barretto, Ai-Ai de las Alas	Comedy	Seiko Films
The Elsa Castillo Story... Ang Katotohanan	Laurice Guillen		Kris Aquino, Eric Quizon, Miguel Rodriguez		OctoArts Films
Epimaco Velasco: NBI	Edgardo Vinarao		Fernando Poe Jr., Charlene Gonzales, Jackie Aquino, Tirso Cruz III, Jess Lapid Jr., Bob Soler, Dick Israel	Action, drama	Viva Films
The Fatima Buen Story	Mario O'Hara		Kris Aquino, John Regala, Zoren Legaspi, Gelli de Belen, Brando Legaspi	Biography	Regal Films
Forever	Rowell Santiago		Aga Muhlach, Mikee Cojuangco	Drama, romance	Viva Films
Geron Olivar	Jesus Jose		Lito Lapid, Edu Manzano, Kris Aquino, Zoren Legaspi, Nida Blanca, Tony Ferrer, Efren Reyes Jr., Jess Lapid Jr., Edgar Mortiz, Edgar Mante, Jackie Forster, Ruel Vernal, Rez Cortez, King Gutierrez	Action	Regal Films
Greggy en' Boogie: Sakyan Mo Na Lang, Anna	Efren Jarlego		Benjie Paras, Babalu, Sheryl Cruz	Comedy	Regal Films
Hataw Tatay Hataw	Efren Jarlego		Dolphy, Sheryl Cruz, Zoren Legaspi, Nanette Medved, Vandolph	Comedy	
Hindi Pa Tapos ang Labada Darling	Tony Reyes		Vic Sotto, Dina Bonnevie	Comedy	Star Cinema Productions Inc
Hindi Pa Tapos ang Laban	Fernando Poe Jr.		Fernando Poe Jr., Michelle Aldana, Paquito Diaz	Action	Viva Films
Ikaw ang Miss Universe ng Buhay Ko	Ben Feleo		Andrew E.	Comedy	Viva Films
Ikaw Lamang Wala ng Iba	Pablo Santiago		Raymart Santiago, Gretchen Barretto, John Estrada, Marco Polo Garcia, Liza Lorena, Ramil Rodriguez, Marita Zobel	Action, romance	Mega Vision Films and Santiago Bros. Productions
Ismael Zacarias	Toto Natividad		Edu Manzano, Eddie Gutierrez, Roi Vinzon, Ramon Christopher, Dencio Padilla, Zandro Zamora, Bomber Moran, Dindo Arroyo, Plinky Recto	Action	Moviestars Production
P're Hanggang Sa Huli	Bebong Osorio		Robin Padilla, Andrew E., Charlene Gonzales, Mat Ranillo III	Action	Viva Films
Ka Hector	Toto Natividad		Phillip Salvador, Dina Bonnevie, Gardo Versoza	Action, biography, drama	Seiko Films
Kadenang Bulaklak	Joel Lamangan		Vina Morales, Ana Roces, Donna Cruz, Angelu de Leon	Drama, romance	Regal Films
Lagalag: The Eddie Fernandez Story	Romy Suzara		Rudy Fernandez, Dawn Zulueta, Tirso Cruz III, Gabby Concepcion, Jess Lapid Jr., Willie Revillame, Dick Israel	Action, biography, crime	Star Cinema Productions & MegaVision Films
Lipa "Arandia" Massacre: Lord, Deliver Us from Evil	Carlo J. Caparas		Vilma Santos, Joel Torre, John Regala, Perla Bautista, Robert Arevalo, Philip Gamboa, Charina Scott, Angelica Panganiban, Liezl Martinez, Ronnie Lazaro	Exploitation	Viva Films; Golden Lion Films Productions
Loretta	Mel Chionglo		Gabby Concepcion, Ruffa Gutierrez, Rosemarie Gil, Jaclyn Jose, Patrick dela Rosa, Toby Alejar, Manny Castaneda, Jennifer Mendoza, Jenette Fernando	Drama, romance	OctoArts Films
Machete II	Mauro Gia Samonte		Gardo Versoza, Snooky Serna, Abby Viduya, Harvey Gomez, Rosanna Roces	Action, drama, romance	Seiko Films
The Maggie dela Riva Story: God... Why Me?	Carlo J. Caparas		Dawn Zulueta, Miguel Rodriguez, John Regala, Michael de Mesa, Ricky Davao, Ali Sotto, Laurice Guillen, Tonton Gutierrez, Liza Lorena, Robert Arevalo	Biographical crime drama	Golden Lion Films
Mars Ravelo's Darna! Ang Pagbabalik	Peque Gallaga; Lore Reyes	William C. Leary	Anjanette Abayari, Edu Manzano, BB Gandanghari, Bong Alvarez, Pilita Corrales, Cherie Gil, Lester Llansang, Ai Ai delas Alas, Eva Ramos, Pen Medina	Superhero	Viva Family Entertainment
Massacre Files	Joey Romero		Zoren Legaspi, Chuck Perez, Monsour del Rosario, Gina Pareño, Amy Austria, Jaclyn Jose, Jess Lapid, Alma Concepcion, Joanne Quintas, Rochelle Barrameda	Crime drama	Regal Films
Maalaala Mo Kaya: The Movie	Olivia Lamasan		Richard Gomez, Aiko Melendez, Chin Chin Gutierrez, Caridad Sanchez	Drama	Star Cinema
Megamol	Eddie Rodriguez		Sharon Cuneta, Andrew E.	Comedy	Viva Films
Midnight Dancers	Mel Chionglo		Alex Del Rosario, Gandong Cervantes, Lawrence David, Luis Cortes, Danny Ramos	Crime, drama	Tangent Films International
Minsan Lang Kita Iibigin	Chito S. Roño		Maricel Soriano, Gabby Concepcion, Zsa Zsa Padilla, Mat Ranillo III	Drama	Star Cinema, Moviestars Productions
Mistah (Mga Mandirigma)	Ricardo Osario		Robin Padilla, Rustom Padilla, Joko Diaz, Roi Vinzon, Daniel Fernando, Jun Hidalgo, July Hidalgo	Action/Suspense	Viva Films
Nag-iisang Bituin	Jose Javier Reyes		Vilma Santos, Aga Muhlach, Christopher de Leon	Drama	Regal Films
Nandito Ako	Jose Balagtas	Edgar Abanilla (Associate Producer), Ramon Salvador (Supervising Producer)	Phillip Salvador, Kris Aquino, John Regala, Bernard Bonnin, Willie Revillame, Danny Riel, Dindo Arroyo, Bob Soler, Written by: Humilde Roxas and Jose Balagtas (story and screenplay), Sound Engineer: Rolly Ruta, Director of Photographered by: Val Dauz, Production Designed by: Noel Luna, Original Music by: Mon Del Rosario	Action, drama	Moviestars Production
Ober Da Bakod	Ariel Ureta	Vic del Rosario (Executive Producer)	Janno Gibbs, Leo Martinez	Comedy	Viva Films
Once Upon a Time in Manila	Tony Y. Reyes		Vic Sotto, Cynthia Luster, Richie D'Horsie, Larry Silva, Charlie Davao, Romy Diaz, Yoyong Martirez, Yoyoy Villame, Val Sotto, Gloria Sevilla, Tiya Pusit	Comedy	Good Harvest & M-Zet Productions
Oo Na, Sige Na!	Eddie Rodriguez		Robin Padilla	Action	Viva Films
Oplan: Mindanao	Jose "Kaka" Balagtas	Atilemrac	Anthony Alonzo, Tony Ferrer, Cherrie Pie Picache, Isadora, Stella Mari, Rhey Roldan, Bobby Benitez, Eric Esguerra, Erwin Montes, Jeric Vasquez	Action	ATB-4 Films
Paano Na? Sa Mundo ni Janet	Jose N. Carreon		Sheryl Cruz, Christopher de Leon, Alma Moreno, Zoren Legaspi, Marco Polo Garcia, Vic Belaro	Drama	Good Harvest Unlimited
Ang Pagbabalik ni Pedro Penduko	J. Erastheo 'Baby' Navoa		Janno Gibbs, Leo Martinez, Chiquito, Arnel Ignacio, Robert Miller, Vina Morales, Danita Paner and Donita Rose	Adventure, fantasy	Viva Family Entertainment
Relaks Ka Lang, Sagot Kita	Danilo P. Cabreira	Charo Santos-Concio (Executive Producer)	Vilma Santos, Ramon "Bong" Revilla Jr., Ruby Rodriguez, Anthony Alonzo, Vic Vargas, Subas Herrero, Edgar Mande, Perla Bautista, King Gutierrez, Manjo Del Mundo, Written by: Humilde 'Meek' Roxas, Bibeth Orteza, Jose Bartolome, (Abel Molina) & Danilo P. Cabreira (story and screenplay), Original Music by: Mon Del Rosario, Film Edited by: Danny Gloria, Cinematographered by: Felizardo Bailen & Ramon Marcelino (directors of photography), Production Designed by: Arthur Santamaria, Art Director (Abel Molina)	Action, drama	Moviestars Production; Novastar Films
Sana'y Laging Magkapiling	Abbo Q. dela Cruz		Dawn Zulueta, Gardo Versoza, Gloria Romero, William Martinez, Toby Alejar, Teresa Loyzaga	Drama, romance	Seiko Films
Si Ayala at si Zobel	Junn P. Cabreira		Anjo Yllana, Ogie Alcasid, Michael V., Babalu, Gary Lising, Nova Villa	Comedy	
Shake, Rattle & Roll V	Jose Javier Reyes, Don Escudero, Manny Castañeda		Episode 1: "Maligno" - Ruffa Gutierrez, Bong Regala, Monsour del Rosario; Episode 2: "Anino" - Sheryl Cruz, Jaclyn Jose, Dingdong Dantes, Ogie Diaz; Episode 3: "Impakto" - Manilyn Reynes, Tom Taus Jr., Chuck Perez, Lilia Cuntapay, Nonong de Andres	Horror	Regal Films
The Secrets of Sarah Jane: Sana'y Mapatawad Mo	Maryo J. de los Reyes		Gelli de Belen, Richard Gomez, Jomari Yllana	Drama, biography	Regal Films
The Untold Story: Vizconde Massacre II - May the Lord Be with Us!	Carlo J. Caparas		Romeo Vasquez, Elizabeth Oropesa, Robert Arevalo, Vina Morales		Viva Films
Tinyente Saplan, Walang Kasukat sa Tapang	Godfrey Ho and Poch Bautista		Edu Manzano, Cynthia Luster, Dan Fernandez, Sharon Young, John Cheung	Action	Solar Films, Filmswell International
Vampira	Joey Romero		Maricel Soriano, Christopher de Leon	Horror	Regal Films
Walang Matigas Na Pulis sa Matinik Na Misis	Danilo P. Cabreira		Ramon "Bong" Revilla Jr., Lani Mercado, Jimmy Santos, Tessie Tomas, King Gutierrez, Plinky Recto, Rod Navarro, Brando Legaspi, Roldan Aquino, Manjo del Mundo	Action comedy	Mahogany Pictures; RRJ Films Production; Moviestars Production
Wating	Ishmael Bernal		Richard Gomez, Carmina Villarroel, Gelli de Belen, Cherie Gil, Bembol Roco	Action	MAQ Productions

== 1995 ==
Film	Director	Producer	Cast	Genre	Company	Notes
1995
Alfredo Lim, Batas ng Maynila	Ramon Jesus Capinpin		Eddie Garcia, Dang Cecilio, Timmy Cruz	Action	Golden Kay International Film & Harvest International Films	
Anabelle Huggins Story: Ruben Ablaza Tragedy - Mea Culpa	Carlo J. Caparas		Dawn Zulueta, Cesar Montano, Maggie de la Riva, Mat Ranillo III	Biographical crime drama	Viva Films	
Ang Tipo Kung Babae	N/A		Jeric Raval, G. Toengi, Efren Reyes Jr., Ramil Rodriguez	Action, drama	Four Aces Entertainment Network Incorporated	Tv Movie.
Ang Tipo Kong Lalake	Efren Jarlego		Joey de Leon, Dennis Padilla, Rufa Mae Quinto, Val Sotto, Jessa Zaragoza	Comedy	Viva Films	
Ang Titser Kong Pogi	Danilo P. Cabrera		Bong Revilla, Sunshine Cruz, Tom Taus, Dick Israel, King Gutierrez, Edgar Mande, Telly Babasa, Ernie Forte, Gerry Roman	Action, comedy	Mahogany Pictures	
Asero	Joey Del Rosario		Cesar Montano, Ricky Davao, Gelli de Belen, Victor Neri, King Gutierrez	Action	Star Cinema	
Barkada Walang Atrasan	Junn Cabreira		Jeric Raval, Zoren Legaspi, Keempee de Leon, Paul Yllana, Ogie Alcasid	Action	OctoArts Films	
Basta't Kasama Kita	Rory Quintos		Aga Muhlach, Dayanara Torres	Drama	Star Cinema	
Basa sa Dagat	Mauro Gia Samonte		Rosanna Roces, Tonton Gutierrez, Jean Garcia, Tony Carreon, Jovit Moya, Carol Dauden, Evelyn Vargas	Romance, erotic	Seiko Films	
Batang X	Peque Gallaga, Lore Reyes		Aiko Melendez, Michael de Mesa, Janus del Prado, John Prats	Action, fantasy	Regal Films	
Bikini Watch	Ben Feleo		Andrew E., Ina Raymundo, Carolyn Sapp, Smokey Manaloto, Shirley Fuentes, Raffy Rodriguez, Jonas Mariano, Glydel Mercado	Comedy	Viva Films	
Boy Gising	Bey Vito		Vandolph, Babalu, Rochell Barrameda, Manilyn Reynes	Comedy, Drama,		
Bunso: Isinilang Kang Palaban	William G. Mayo	Vic del Rosario Jr. and Orly R. Ilacad (Executive Producers)	Jeric Raval, Julio Diaz, Subas Herrero, Dan Alavaro, Ricardo Cepeda, and King Gutierrez	Action	Octoarts Films	
Costales	Jose N. Carreon, Toto Natividad		Edu Manzano, Gretchen Barretto, Anthony Alonzo, Jess Lapid Jr., Sunshine Cruz, Monsour del Rosario	Action	Regal Films	
Campus Girls	Mac Alejandre		Vina Morales, Donna Cruz, Donita Rose	Comedy, drama	Viva Films	
Delinkwente	Francis "Jun" Posadas		Kier Legaspi, Emilo Garcia, Gando Cervantes, Francis Enriquez and Raymond Bagatsing, Stella Ruiz, Joanne Pascual, Efren Reyes Jr., Robert Arevalo	Drama, romance	Mahogany Pictures	
Demolisyon Dayuhan sa Sariling Bayan	Roland Ledesma		Anthony Alonzo, Jaclyn Jose, Michael de Mesa, Alicia Alonzo, Gina Alajar, Lito Legaspi	Action, drama	Sunlight Films	
Di Mapigil ang Init	Toto Natividad, Chito S. Roño		Jestoni Alarcon, Rosanna Roces, Miguel Rodriguez, Rosemarie Gil, Jovit Moya, Sylvia Sanchez, Gretchen Barretto, Tony Mebesa, Cris Daluz	Action, romance, erotic	Seiko Films	
Dog Tag: Kamay ng Katarungan	Augusto Salvador	Victor Villegas (Executive Producer)	Jestoni Alarcon	Action	Mahogany Pictures	
Emergency Call	Kazuki Ōmori	Hisao Masuda	Hiroyuki Sanada, Lorna Tolentino, Sharmaine Arnaiz, Daniel Fernando	Drama	Nippon Herald Films & Megavision Films	Japanese-Filipino co-production
Eskapo	Chito S. Roño	Simon C. Ongpin	Christopher de Leon, Richard Gomez, Dina Bonnevie, Ricky Davao, Mark Anthony Fernandez, Eric Fructuoso, Romeo Rivera, Miguel Faustman, Agusto Victa, Ramon Recto	Historical thriller	Star Cinema	
The Flor Contemplacion Story	Carlo J. Caparas		Nora Aunor, Amy Austria, Rita Avila, Ian de Leon, Vina Morales, Jaclyn Jose, Julio Diaz, Ara Mina, Caridad Sanchez, Bob Solar, Ronaldo Valdez	Crime, drama	Viva Films	
Gayuma, Sana'y Mahalin Mo Rin Ako	Tata Esteban		Amanda Page, Maritoni Fernandez, Julio Diaz, Jay Manalo, Marissa Delgado, Lucita Soriano, Renato del Prado, Archie Adamos, Gino Ilustre	Erotic drama, romance	Falcon Films	
Gising Na... Ang Higanteng Natutulog!	Arturo San Agustin		Andy Poe, Romy Diaz, Bob Soler, Glenda Garcia, Berting Labra, Rey Roldan, Ernie David, Erwin Montes, Banjo Romero, Lovely Mansueto, Danny Riel, Star as Kaibigan, In Special Roles: Two Action Superheroes, Vic Varrion, Bert Cayanan, Vic Santos, Nonong Talvo, Christian San Agustin, Ritchie Ylaya, Carling Conje, Jeric Vasquez, Boy Gomez, Gerry Roman, Ariel Reyes, Leo Lazaro, Tony Matin, Alex Flores, Allan San Diego, Lito Valiente, Alma Mendoza, Dr. Johnny Castor, Ernie Aguilar, Zaldo Cruz, Romy Dela Cruz, Victor Geronimo, Dick Fajardo	Action	ATB-4 Films	
Hataw Na!	Jose Javier Reyes	Jose Javier Reyes (story, screenplay)	Gary Valenciano, Dayanara Torres, Nida Blanca, Jao Mapa, Victor Neri, Roselle Nava, Jolina Magdangal, Lindsay Custodio	Comedy, romance	Star Cinema	
Kakaibang Karisma	Neal "Buboy" Tan		Karla Estrada, Sabrina M., Perla Bautista, Rey Abellana, John Nite, Ray Ventura, Ursula Ortiz	Drama, romance	CVH Production	
Kailanman	Manny Castaneda		Sheryl Cruz, Manilyn Reynes, Zoren Legaspi, Aljon Jimenez, Eva Darren, Dexter Doria, Evelyn Vargas, Tia Pusit	Drama, romance	Regal Films	
Kana	Cesar SB Abella		Janine Barredo, John Regala, Toby Alejar, Jorge Estregan, Bing Davao, Edwin Reyes, Banjo Romero, Marielle Salvador, Kristin Sablan	Action, drama, romance	Viva Films	
Kandungan	Mauro Gia Samonte		Rosanna Roces, Gardo Versoza, Tonton Gutierrez, Liza Lorena, Lovely Rivero	Erotic drama, romance	Seiko Films	
Karanasan: The Claudia Zobel Story	Mike Relon Makiling		Sabrina M., Emilio Garcia, Rey Abellana, Patrick dela Rosa, Lovely Rivero, Don Umali, Dante Rivero, Dexter Doria	Erotic drama, romance	Venus Films and Libran Motion Pictures	
Kanto Boy 2: Ang Anak ni Totoy Guapo	Augusto Salvador		Ian Veneracion	Action	Moviestars Production	
Kirot II	Rico Mambo (Abbo Q. Dela Cruz)		Gardo Versoza, Rosanna Roces, Gina Pareño, Jovit Moya, Jeffrey Santos, Rizza Villafuerte	Erotic drama	Seiko Films	
Ikaw Pa... Eh Love Kita	Danilo Cabreira		Lito Lapid, Maricel Soriano, Nida Blanca, Ricky Davao, Bembol Roco, Willie Revillame, Rez Cortez, Jess Lapid Jr.	Action	Regal Films	
Indecent Professor	Felix E. Dalay		Leo Martinez, Marjorie Barretto, Amanda Page	Comedy	Falcon Films	
The Jessica Alfaro Story	Francis Posadas	Tony Calvento (Writer)	Alice Dixson, Rustom Padilla, Gary Estrada, Robert Arevalo, Ramon Christopher, Chris Daluz, Ariel Rivera, Angelu de Leon, Carlos Padilla Jr.	Action, biography, crime	Viva Films	
Judge Max Asuncion: Hukom Bitay	Francis Posadas		Eddie Garcia, Evangeline Pascual, Efren Reyes Jr., Luis Gonzales, Mat Ranillo III	Action	Viva Films	
The Lilian Velez Story: Till Death Do Us Part	Carlo J. Caparas		Sharon Cuneta, Cesar Montano, Joel Torre	Biographical crime drama	Golden Lions Films and Viva Films	
Lt. Rolito Reynoso: Mahirap Patayin	Jett C. Espiritu, Johnny Ramirez		George Estregan Jr., Dan Alvaro, Jess Lapid Jr., King Gutierrez, Renato del Prado, Boy Gomez, Ramon Zamora	Action	DJ Films International	
The Marita Gonzaga Rape-Slay: In God We Trust!	Carlo J. Caparas		Sunshine Cruz, Jinggoy Estrada, Maggie de la Riva	Crime, drama	Regal Films	
Iligpit si Bobby Ortega: Markang Bungo 2	Eddie Rodriguez		Rudy Fernandez, Charlene Gonzales, Anthony Alonzo, Lito Legaspi, Bing Loyzaga, Rez Cortez, Manjo Del Mundo, Joey Padilla, Pen Medina	Action, drama	Viva Films	
Muntik Nang Maabot ang Langit	Manuel "Fyke" Cinco		Charito Solis, Tonton Gutierrez, Patrick Guzman, Shirley Fuentes, Brando Legaspi, Jennifer Mendoza, Lucita Soriano	Erotic drama, romance	OctoArts Films	
Pare Ko	Jose Javier Reyes		Mark Anthony Fernandez, Jomari Yllana, Claudine Barretto, Jao Mapa, Gio Alvarez, Victor Neri, Nikka Valencia	Comedy	Star Cinema	
O-Ha! Ako Pa?	Mike Relon Makiling		Jimmy Santos, Ogie Alcasid, Patrick Guzman, Sunshine Cruz	Comedy	OctoArts Films	
Patikim ng Pinya	Abbo De La Cruz		Rosanna Roces, Leandro Baldemor, Natasha Ledesma, Anton Bernardo	Erotic drama, comedy	Seiko Films	
Pigilan natin ang Dilim	N/A		Zoren Legaspi, Donita Rose	Horror, drama	Four Aces Entertainment Network Inc.	TV Movie.
Pulis Patola 2	Felix E. Dalay		Anjo Yllana, Bembol Roco	Comedy	Seiko Films	
Pulis Probinsya 2: Tapusin na Natin ang Laban	Augusto Salvador		Phillip Salvador, Eddie Gutierrez, Sheryl Cruz, Roldan Aquino, Willie Revillame, Julio Diaz, Dencio Padilla, Janus Del Prado, Atoy Co, Jessie Delgado, Brando Legaspi, Al Tantay, Manjo Del Mundo	Action	Regal Films	
Rollerboys	Jose Javier Reyes		Tirso Cruz III, Gloria Romero, Patrick Garcia, G. Toengi	Action, Adventure, Comedy	Regal Films	
Run Barbi Run	Tony Y. Reyes		Joey de Leon, Maricel Laxa, Eraserheads	Comedy	Moviestar Productions	
Sa Ngalan ng Pag-ibig	Maryo J. delos Reyes		Christopher de Leon, Lorna Tolentino, Alma Concepcion	Romance	Regal Films	
Sabado Nights	Romy Suzara		Ina Raymundo, Michelle Parton, Pia Pilapil	Drama	Neo Films	
Salamat Sa Lotto	Carlo J Caparas		Eddie Garcia, Tessie Tomas, Gina Alajar, Maggie Dela Riva, Jinggoy Estrada, Boots Anson-Roa, Tommy Abuel	Comedy, drama	N/A	
Sambahin Mo ang Katawan Ko	Francis "Jun" Posadas		Tonton Gutierrez, Emilio Garcia, Janet Diaz, Stella Ruiz, Lito Legaspi, Perla Bautista, Ramil Rodriguez, Pen Medina, Ray Ventura	Erotic drama, romance	Mahogany Pictures	
Sana Maulit Muli	Olivia Lamasan		Aga Muhlach Lea Salonga	Romance	Star Cinema Film Productions	
Si Maryo o Si Goko	Bibs Austria		William Martinez, Isabel Granada, Rey Abellana	Action, comedy, fantasy	Silverstar Productions	
Urban Rangers	Jose 'Kaka' Balagtas		Raymart Santiago, Ace Espinosa, Jay Manalo, Joko Diaz, Jun Aristorenas, Romeo Vasquez, Pia Pilapil, Amado Cortez	Action	Viva Films	
Urban Terrorist 2	Tata Nel		Dindo Arroyo, George Estregan Jr., Dan Fernandez, Jess Lapid Jr.	Action	Intercinema and South Cotabato Films	
Victim No. 1: Delia Maga (Jesus, Pray for Us!)	Carlo J. Caparas		Gina Alajar, Joel Torre, Val Victa	Crime, drama	Regal Films	
Wilson Sorronda: Leader Kuratong Baleleng's Solid Group	Carlo J. Caparas		Jinggoy Estrada, Sunshine Cruz, Jackie Aquino, Bong Revilla, Michael de Mesa, Rudy Fernandez	Action	Regal Films	

== 1996 ==
Film	Director	Producer	Cast	Genre	Company
1996
Adan Lazaro	William G. Mayo		Roi Vinzon, Sunshine Cruz, Roldan Aquino	Action	EDL Productions
Ang Misis Kong Hoodlum	Efren Jarlego		Joey de Leon, Samantha Lopez, Raffy Rodriguez	Comedy	Neo Films
Ang Mamatay Nang Dahil Sa 'yo	Efren Baruelo		Anthony Alonzo, Larry Angeles, Lovely Rivero, Dan Alvaro, Banjo Romero, Erwin Montes, Nert Cayanan, Vic Felipe, Ariel Reyes, King Gutierrez, Tony Martin, Boy Gomez, Allan San Diego, Angela Morena, Lovely Mansueto, Wally Oftana, Turling Pader, Mar Del Rio, Lito Valiente, Dennis Cruz	Action, drama	ATB-4 Films
Ang Pinakamagandang Hayop sa Balat ng Lupa	Celso Ad Castillo		Ruffa Gutierrez, Evangeline Pascual, Dindi Gallardo, Janine Barredo, Cheska Diaz, Paquito Diaz, Dick Israel, Michelle Aldana, Ruffa Mae Quinto, Ray Ventura	Action, drama	Viva Films, Royal Era
Aring King King: Ang Bodyguard Kong Sexy	Jett Espiritu		Dolphy, Vandolph, Anjanette Abayari, Tirso Cruz III, Babalu, Jean Garcia, Dick Israel	Comedy	Premiere Entertainment Productions
Bahala Na vs. Sigue-Sigue Sputnik	Dante Pangilinan		Chuck Perez, George Estregan Jr., King Gutierrez, Vic Belaro, Mon Confiado, Liza Lorena	Action	Good Harvest Unlimited
Bala Ko Sa Huling Tapang Mo	William G. Mayo		Patrick Dela Rosa, Alou Gonzales, Paquito Diaz, Ruel Vernal	Action	Libran Films and OctoArts Films
Bangis	Phillip Ko; Rogelio Salvador		Monsour del Rosario, Rando Almanzor, Dindo Arroyo	Action	Regal Films
Batang Z	Jett Espiritu		Tom Taus, George Estregan Jr., Melissa Mendez, Berting Labra, Daniel Pasia, Marco Ballesteros, Panyang	Sci-fi, fantasy	MAQ Productions
Bawal na Halik	Edd Palmos		Glydel Mercado, Daniel Fernando, Jay Manalo, Ruby Moreno	Drama, romance	Falcon Films
Bayarang Puso	Jose Javier Reyes		Aga Muhlach, Lorna Tolentino, Carmina Villarroel, Cherry Pie Picache, Sharmaine Suarez, Evangeline Pascual, Ramil Rodriguez, Dexter Doria, Manny Castaneda	Drama, romance	Regal Films
Bilang Na ang Araw Mo	Toto Nativdad	Marivic B. Ong (Associate Producer), William C. Leary (Producer), and Vic Del Rosario Jr. (Executive Producer)	Cesar Montano, Charlene Gonzales, Dennis Roldan, Willie Revillame, Jun Hidalgo, July Hidalgo, Eric Jimenez, Doming Olivar, Rey Tomenez, Robert Miller, Boy Acosta, Pio Hidalgo Jr., Miko Manzon, Mike Magat, Anthony Castelo, Augusto Victa, and Brando Legaspi	Action	Neo Films
Bitag, Babae at Bala	Victor Tango		Jestoni Alarcon, Stella Ruiz, Efren Reyes Jr.	Action	Mahogany Pictures
Bossing: The Carlo Diamante Story	Rey Sagum		Ronald Ledesma, Lito Legaspi, Boy Fernandez, Jose Manalo	Action	Sunlight Films
Bridesmaids	Ike Jarlego	Vic del Rosario (Executive Producer)	Charlene Gonzales, Ina Raymundo, Jennifer Sevilla, Jenny Syquia, Albert Martinez, Maritoni Fernandez	Comedy, romance	Viva Films
Cara y Cruz Walang Sinasanto	Jun Aristorenas		Raymart Santiago, Dennis Padilla, Jun Aristorenas	Action	Viva Films
Do Re Mi	Ike Jarlego Jr.		Donna Cruz, Regine Velasquez, Mikee Cojuangco, Gloria Romero, Gary Estrada, Anthony Cortez, Melisse Santiago, Lee Robin Salazar, Ramil Rodriguez	Comedy, musical	Neo Films
Dyesebel	Emmanuel Borlaza		Charlene Gonzales, Matthew Mendoza, Gloria Diaz	Fantasy	Viva Films
Emong Salvacion: Humanda Ka...Oras Mo Na!	Francis Posadas		Eddie Garcia, Gardo Versoza, Raymond Keannu, Beth Tamayo, Giorgia Ortega, Ara Mina, Dennis Roldan	Action	Regal Films
Enteng And the Shaolin Kids	Danilo P Cabreira		Vic Sotto, Jacky Shix, Charito Solis	Action	M-Zet Productions, Moviearts Films, Regal Films
Evangeline Katorse	Efren S. Alverio		Rita Magdalena, Tonton Gutierrez, Eddie Gutierrez, Elizabeth Oropesa, Roy Alvarez, Pen Medina, Juan Carlos Castro, Allona Amor	Erotic drama	V-Rich Films
Exploitation	Mauro Gia Samonte		Priscilla Almeda, Isko Moreno, Natasha Ledesma, Dexter Doria, Michelle Ortega, Beverly Salviejo	Erotic drama, romance	Seiko Films
Ganti ng Puso	Francis Posadas		Stella Ruiz, Dennis Roldan, Efren Reyes Jr., King Gutierrez, Gandong Cervantes, Carol Dauden, Lara Morena	Comedy, romance	Viva Films
Gloria, Gloria Labandera	Eduardo "Edd" Palmos		Rufa Mae Quinto, Albert Martinez, Jay Manalo, Maritoni Fernandez, Odette Khan, Dexter Doria	Comedy, romance, erotic	Viva Films
Hawak Ko Buhay Mo!	Ronnie Ricketts (Credited as Ronn Rick)	Mariz Ricketts (Line Producer), William C. Leary (Producer), and Vic Del Rosario Jr (Executive Producer)	Ronnie Ricketts, Michelle Aldana, Michael de Mesa	Action	Neo Films
Habang Lalong Nasasaktan Tumatapang	Jose Balagtas	Hermie Go (Associate Producer), William C. Leary (Producer), and Vic Del Rosario Jr (Executive Producer)	Ace Espionsa, Rufa Mae Quinto, Jay Manalo, Dexter Doria, Dindo Arroyo, Robert Miller, Bomber Moran, Ernie David, June Hidalgo (as Jun Hidalgo), July Hidalgo	Action	Neo Films
Hangga't May Hininga	Toto Natividad	Ramon Salvador (Supervising Producer), Malou N. Santos (Producer), Charo Santos Concio (Executive Producer)	Phillip Salvador, Anjanette Abayari, Dennis Roldan, Tirso Cruz III, Tony Bagyo, Dindo Arroyo	Action	Star Cinema
Humanda Ka Babalikan Kita	Roland Ledesma		Tony Ferrer, Roland Gan, Boy Fernandez, Bembol Roco	Action	Solar Films
Ikaw Naman Ang Iiyak	Joel Lamangan	William C. Leary	Dawn Zulueta, Sheryl Cruz, Charlene Gonzales, Gary Estrada, Matthew Mendoza, Shintaro Valdez, Chinggoy Alonzo	Crime, Drama, Neo Noir, Romance, Thriller	Viva Films
Init sa Tag-ulan	Ramje		Ara Mina, Danilo Fernandez, Raymond Keannu, Ramon Recto, George Estregan Jr., Ramon Almanzor, Bobby Benitez, Dante Castro, Berting Labra, Tony Mabesa, Daniel Pasia, Lou Veloso	Erotic drama, romance	Good Harvest Productions
Ipaglaban Mo: The Movie	Marilou Diaz-Abaya		Chin-Chin Gutierrez, Sharmaine Arnaiz, Nida Blanca	Drama	Star Cinema
Isa Lang ang Dapat Mahalin	Erwin Torres Lanado		Maricel Morales, Daniel Fernando, Ursula Ortiz, Richard Bonnin, Dencio Padilla, Bing Davao, Conrad Poe, Gem Castillo	Erotic drama	CVH Productions
Isla (The Younger Version)	Celso Ad. Castillo		Via Veloso, Alma Antonio, Roldan Aquino, Ana Capri, Benjie Felipe, Tonton Gutierrez, Dick Israel, Rachel Lobangco, Jean Saburit, Sylvia Sanchez, Ronaldo Valdez	Erotic drama	Four Aces Productions
Isla Paraiso	Rogelio Baruelo		Janet Diaz, Sheila Ysrael, Lawrence David, Carol Dauden, Erwin Montes	Erotic drama	Gem Vision Productions
Itataya Ko any Buhay Ko	Jose N. Carreon		Rudy Fernandez, Dawn Zulueta, Ricky Davao, Mark Gil, Mat Ranillo III, Bob Soler, Lito Legaspi, Charito Solis	Action	Seiko Films
Kahit Kailan	Maryo J. de los Reyes		Richard Gomez, Aiko Melendez, Jomari Yllana, Giselle Toengi, Roberto Aviles, Melissa Mendez, Johnny Vicar	Drama	MAQ Productions
Kara, Kaakit-akit	Maryo J. de los Reyes		Izza Ignacio, Raymond Bagatsing, Emilio Garcia, Raquel Romero, Danny Ramos, Lyka Ledesma	Erotic drama, romance	FLT Films, Kara Films
Kool Ka Lang	Danilo Cabreira		Jessa Zaragoza, Rufa Mae Quinto, Cara Marsan, Erika Fife, Rizza Padilla, Jay Manalo, Lander Vera-Perez, Brando Legaspi, Lee Robin Salazar, Michael Gomez	Comedy, romance, erotic	Star Cinema
Kristo	Ben Yalung		Mat Ranillo III	Drama	Cine Suerte
Kung Kaya Mo, Kaya Ko Rin	Danilo Cabreira		Maricel Soriano, Cesar Montano	Action, comedy	Star Cinema
Kung Alam Mo Lang	Boots Plata		Judy Ann Santos, Gladys Reyes, Jacklyn Jose, Cherry Pie Picache, Charlie Mendoza, Christopher Roxas, Wowie de Guzman	Drama	MAQ Productions
Lihim	Dante Pangilinan		Ina Raymundo, Matthew Mendoza, Anthony Cortes, King Gutierrez	Erotic drama	Falcon Films
Mabango	Mauro Gia Samonte	Mauro Gia Samonte (story)	Gardo Versoza, Anton Bernardo, Dante Rivero, Isabel Reyes, Mahalia Mendez	Erotic drama, romance	Seiko Films
Madrasta	Olivia Lamasan	Olivia Lamasan, Ricardo Lee	Sharon Cuneta, Christopher de Leon, Zsa Zsa Padilla, Nida Blanca, Claudine Barretto, Camille Prats, Patrick Gracia, Rico Yan, Eula Valdez, Cris Villanueva, Teresa Loyzaga	Drama, romance	Star Cinema
Madaling Mamatay Mahirap Mabuhay	Ronnie Ricketts (Credited as Ronn Rick)	Mariz Ricketts (Line Producer), William C. Leary (Producer), and Vic Del Rosario (Executive Producer)	Ronnie Ricketts, Mariz Ricketts, Mark Gil, Dindi Gallardo	Action	Neo Films
Magic Temple	Peque Gallaga and Lore Reyes		Jason Salcedo, Junell Hernando, Jun Urbano, Anna Larrucea, Gina Pareño, Aljon Jimenez, Jackie Lou Blanco	Fantasy, action, adventure	Star Cinema
Makamandag na Bango	Jose Balagtas		Rita Magdalena, Emilio Garcia, Sabrina M., King Gutierrez, Dencio Padilla, Roldan Aquino, Niño Muhlach, Bob Soler	Erotic drama	Kara Films, Balagtas/Pilar Productions
Masamang Damo	Victor Tango		Joko Diaz, Ina Raymundo, Efren Reyes Jr., Gloria Sevilla, Willie Revillame, Dindo Arroyo, Jessa Zaragoza	Action, romance	Viva Films
Mga Nagbabagang Labi	Humilde "Meek" Roxas		Jestoni Alarcon, Rosanna Roces, Daniel Fernando, Sheila Ysrael, Marita Zobel, Joy Viado	Action, romance	Seiko Films
Nagmumurang Kamatis... Kumakasa Ka Pa!	Luciano B. Carlos		Eddie Garcia, Boots Anson-Roa, Wendell Ramos, Cita Astals, Bob Soler, Sharmaine Suarez, Michelle Parton, Via Veloso, Denise Joaquin, Theresa Aldea	Comedy	Premiere Productions
Nang Mamulat si Eba, Part 2	Rico Mambo (Abbo Q. dela Cruz)		Rosanna Roces, Anton Bernardo, Franco Zobel, Deborah Carpio, Gina Pareño, Perla Bautista	Erotic drama, romance	Seiko Films
Nananabik... sa 'yong Pagbabalik	Neal "Buboy" Tan		Ursula Ortiz, Tonton Gutierrez, Amy Austria, Sheila Ysrael, Odette Khan	Erotic drama, romance	CVH Productions
Nights of Serafina	Joey Gosiengfiao		Giorgia Ortega, Mike Magat, John Apacible, Angelika dela Cruz, Jo-An Jackson, Hector Gomez, Tyrone Suarez, Jon-Jon Salvador	Erotic drama, romance	Mother Studio Productions
Ober Da Bakod 2: Da Treasure Adbentyur	Ariel Ureta	Vic del Rosario (Executive Producer)	Janno Gibbs, Anjo Yllana, Leo Martinez	Comedy	Neo Films
Oki Doki Doc	Efren Jarlego		Aga Muhlach, Babalu, Agot Isidro, Claudine Barretto, Jimmy Santos	Comedy	Star Cinema
Paracale Gang	Armando De Guzman Jr.		Jay Manalo, Rufa Mae Quinto, Jessa Zaragosa, Ramon Christopher, Kier Legaspi, Brando Legaspi, Sonny Parsons, Robert Talby, Jeric Vasquez	Action	Falcon Films
Pusong Hiram	Leonardo Jose		Rita Magdalena, Emilio Garcia, Richard Bonnin, Gem Castillo, Dencio Padilla	Erotic drama, romance	Kara Films, RJ Films
Radio Romance	Jose Javier Reyes		Gelli de Belen, Paolo Abrera, Sharmaine Arnaiz	Drama, romance	Star Cinema
Reputasyon	Elwood Perez		Amalia Fuentes, Romeo Vasquez, Gloria Diaz, Miya Nolasco, Miguel Salverion, Roy Alvarez, Mitch Valdes, Nanette Inventor, Romano Vasquez, Lisa Macuja, Bon Vibar	Drama	Nolasco Visual Arts Inc.
Romano Sagrado: Talim sa Dilim	Rogelio "Eyo" Salvador		Monsour del Rosario, Edu Manzano, Alma Concepcion, John Estrada, Dindo Arroyo, Orestes Ojeda	Action	Regal Films
Room for Rent (Dingding Lang ang Pagitan)	Jay-Jay P. Cabreira		Stella Ruiz, Emilio Garcia, Raymond Bagatsing, Bernadette Marquez, Lito Pimentel	Erotic drama, romance	Mahogany Pictures
Rubberman	Edgardo Vinarao		Michael V., Beth Tamayo, Gloria Romero, Dick Israel, Roy Alvarez, Allan K.	Comedy, fantasy, action	Octoarts Films and Cinemax Studios
Sa Kamay ng Batas	Pepe Marcos		Edu Manzano, Alma Concepcion, John Estrada	Action	Regal Films
Sariwa	Rico Mambo (Joselito 'Abbo' Q. dela Cruz)		Priscilla Almeda, Romnick Sarmenta, Leandro Baldemor, Gina Pareño, Luz Valdez, Jimmy Fabregas, Anita Linda, Beverly Salviejo	Erotic drama, romance	Seiko Films
Sariwang Bulaklak	Cesar SB Abella		Tonton Gutierrez, Sheila Ysrael, Mikee Villanueva	Erotic drama, romance	El Niño Films
Santo-Santito	Deo Fajardo Jr.		Michael Rivero, Izza Ignacio, Amy Austria, Efren Reyes Jr., Mark Gil, Dick Israel, Ali Sotto, Perla Bautista, Odette Khan, Kevin Delgado, Jude Estrada, Boy Roque	Action	FLT Films International
Sobra-Sobra, Labis-Labis	Tata Esteban		Ina Raymundo, Amanda Page, Daniel Fernando, Ramon Christopher, Richard Bonnin, Shintaro Valdez, Jay Manalo, Ana Bautista	Erotic drama, romance	Falcon Films
Segurista	Tikoy Aguiluz	Eric M. Cuatico	Michelle Aldana, Gary Estrada, Albert Martinez, Julio Diaz	Crime, Drama, Neo Noir, Mystery, Thriller	Neo Films
Seth Corteza	Efren C. Piñon	Ronald Stephen Monteverde	Ace Vergel, Joanne Quintas Luis Gonzales, Carlos Padilla Jr., Amado Cortez, George Estregan Jr. Raymond Keannu Sylvia Sanchez, Zandro Zamora Ruel Vernal, Orestes Ojeda, Johnny Vicar, Bernard Bonnin	Action, Crime	Regal Films
Strict ang Peyrents Ko	Edgardo "Boy" Vinarao		Gary Estrada, Elizabeth Ramsey, Amanda Page, Erika Fife, Bernadette Allyson, Zeny Zabala, Michael Gomez, Marissa Delgado, Alicia Alonzo	Comedy, romance	Neo Films
Taguan	Don Escudero		Gelli de Belen, Jomari Yllana, G Toengi, Wendell Ramos	Comedy, romance	MAQ Productions
Tirad Pass: The Last Stand of Gen. Gregorio del Pilar	Carlo J. Caparas		Romnick Sarmenta, Obet Pagdanganan, Joel Torre, Tommy Abuel, Robert Arevalo, Mikee Villanueva, Mia Gutierrez, Kimberly Diaz	Biographical war	Uni-Films Production and Golden Lion Films
Totoy ng Bangkusay	Dante Pangilinan		King Gutierrez, Gabriel Romulo	Action	ATB-4 Films
Trudis Liit	Jett Espiritu		Julio Diaz, Amy Austria, Jean Garcia, Jackie Aquino, Paquito Diaz, Suzette Ranillo, Dick Israel, Agatha Tapan, Marijoy Adorable	Drama	OctoArts Films
Tubusin Mo ng Bala ang Puso Ko	Toto Natividad		Anjanette Abayari, Edu Manzano	Action	OctoArts Films and Cinemax Studios
Tukso, Layuan Mo Ako, Part 2	Robbie Tan		Priscilla Almeda, Isko Moreno, Leandro Baldemor, Isabel Reyes, Celia Rodriguez	Erotic drama, romance	Seiko Films
Utol	Toto Natividad	Malou N. Santos	Cesar Montano, Eddie Gutierrez, Alma Concepcion, Victor Neri, Jess Lapid Jr., Pen Medina	Action	Star Cinema
Unang Tibok	Jerry O Tirazona, Erwin Lanado	Jerry O Tirazona, Erwin Lanado	Eric Fructuoso, Miya Nolasco, Rita Magdalena, Rey 'PJ' Abellana, Michael Alano, Odette Khan	Erotic drama, romance	Leo Films
Virgin Island	Augusto "Totoy" Buenaventura		Maricel Morales, Eric Fructuoso, Rey 'PJ' Abellana, Perla Bautista, Ernie Zarate, Jojo Abellana, Jess Lapid Jr., Dexter Doria, Augusto Victa, Pocholo Montes	Erotic drama	Classic Films International
Virgin People	Celso Ad Castillo		Sunshine Cruz, Sharmaine Suarez, Tonton Gutierrez, Ronaldo Valdez, Roldan Aquino, Ana Capri	Erotic drama, romance	Four Aces Productions

== 1997 ==
Film	Director	Producer	Cast	Genre	Company
1997
Adarna: The Mythical Bird	Geirry A. Garccia		Jolina Magdangal, Marvin Agustin, Boots Anson-Roa, Martin Nievera and Regine Velasquez	Adventure, fantasy	Guiding Light Productions and FLT Films International
Ako Lang sa Langit	Neal "Buboy" Tan	Neal "Buboy" Tan	Camille Roxas, Ramona Revilla, Emilio Garcia, Daniel Fernando, Elizabeth Oropesa, Amy Austria, Adonis Laxamana, Jun Encarnacion, Katrina Paula	Erotic drama	Amaritz Films
Alindog ng Lahi	F.C. Gargantilla		Rita Magdalena, Carlos Morales, Jett Javier, Alyssa Alvarez, Marita Zobel	Erotic drama	Good Harvest Productions
Alyas Baby Tsino: Tatagos sa Puso	Jose Balagtas		Dante Varona, Derek Dee, Sharmaine Suarez, Glydel Mercado, Dick Israel, Kier Legaspi, Boy Fernandez, Sonny Padilla, Usman Hassim, Robert Miller, Renato del Prado, Robert Talby, Tony Bernal, Johnny Vicar, Rommel Valdez, Levi de Leon, Danny Labra, Alex de Leon, Mark Castro, Vic Belaro, Allan Rogelio, Mandy Ochoa, Maj. Willie Dangane, Tony Martinez, Tony Bagyo, Boy Sanggol, Erwin Tala	Action	IAM Productions
Anak ni Boy Negro	Toto Natividad		Joko Diaz, Donita Rose, Rufa Mae Quinto, Kier Legaspi, Ramon Christopher, Willie Revillame, Shintaro Valdez, Brando Legaspi, Evangeline Pascual, Michael Vera-Perez	Action	Viva Films
Anak ng Yakuza	Esmeraldo Santos, Rico Tariman		Glydel Mercado, Jean Saburit, Rey Abellana, Patrick dela Rosa, Adonis Laxamana	Erotic drama, action	Leo Films
Ang Ambisyosa	Neal "Buboy" Tan		Glydel Mercado, Rita Magdalena, Tonton Gutierrez, Emilio Garcia, Ronaldo Valdez, Elizabeth Oropesa, Roy Rodrigo, Jorge Estregan, Rossana Marquez	Action, romance, erotic	V-Rich Films
Ang Probinsyano	Ronwaldo Reyes		Fernando Poe Jr., Dindi Gallardo, Amanda Page	Action	FPJ Productions
Ang Pulubi at ang Princesa	Jerry Lopez Sineneng	Malou N. Santos (producer) & Charo Santos-Concio (executive producer)	Camille Prats, Angelica Panganiban, Romnick Sarmenta, Sharmaine Arnaiz, Emilio Garcia, Eula Valdes, Ricardo Cepeda, John Lapus, Mon Confiado	Drama, comedy	Star Cinema
Askal (Asong Kalye)	John Regala		John Regala, Beth Tamayo, Mikee Villanueva, Mat Ranillo III	Action	JVS Productions
Asawa Mo, Misis Ko	Danilo "Junn" Cabreira		Via Veloso, Patrick Guzman, Emilio Garcia, Sheila Ysrael, Jaime Fabregas, Winnie Cordero	Erotic drama, romance	Good Harvest Productions
Ayos Lang, Pare Ko	Romy Suzara		Rudy Fernandez, Gelli de Belen, Ogie Alcasid	Action, comedy	Megavision Films
Babae	Lupita Kashiwahara		Nora Aunor, Judy Ann Santos, Jao Mapa, Nida Blanca, Mark Gil, Luis Gonzales	Drama	GEM
Babae sa Dalampasigan	Stefan Darossi (Dante Javier)		Sabrina M., Toffee Calma, Philp Henson, Ynez Veneracion, Gina Pareno, Orestes Ojeda, Evangeline Pascual, Archie Ventosa	Erotic drama, romance	Good Harvest Productions
Babasaging Kristal	Peter Kim Roland		Ramona Revilla, Jorge Estregan, Rey Abellana, Romy Diaz, Renato del Prado, Lucita Soriano	Comedy, romance, erotic	Astar Films
Bagamundo	Dante Pangilinan		Chuck Perez, Cristina Gonzales, Priscilla Almeda	Action	Solar Films
Bagsik ng Kamao	Leonardo Garcia		Edu Manzano, Sharmaine Suarez, Luisito Espinosa, Jess Lapid Jr., Charlie Davao	Action	EDL Productions
Bakit Kailangan ng Ibon ang Pakpak?	Mauro Gia Samonte		Tonton Gutierrez, Sabrina M., Vic Vargas, Rosita Rosal, Dencio Padilla	Erotic drama, romance	Starlight Films
Bandido	Efren C. Piñon		Zoren Legaspi, Anjanette Abayari, Rando Almanzor, Mat Ranillo III	Action	Regal Films
Baril sa Baril	Romy Suzara		Zoren Legaspi, Chuck Perez, Glydel Mercado, Rez Cortez, Dexter Doria	Action, romance	MAQ Productions
Batang Estero	Deo J. Fajardo Jr.		Michael Rivero, Julio Diaz, John Regala, George Estregan Jr., Beth Tamayo, Dick Israel, Dante Rivero, Raymart Santiago	Action	FLT Films International
Batas Militar	Jon Red	Kara Magsanoc-Alikpala	Joonee Gamboa	Documentary	Foundation for Worldwide People Power
Bihagin ang Dalagang Ito	Arturo San Agustin		Izza Ignacio, Renzo Cruz, Tirso Cruz III, Berting Labra, Ramona Revilla	Erotic drama, romance	Skorpion Films
Bawal Mahalin, Bawal Ibigin	Jay-Jay Cabreira		Danilo Fernandez, Emilio Garcia, Rita Magdalena, Stella Ruiz, Roberto Aviles, Cris Daluz, Lito Pimentel	Drama, romance	MAQ Productions
Bayad Puri	Joel Lamangan		Dindi Gallardo, Ruby Moreno, Chin-Chin Gutierrez, Charito Solis, Jay Manalo, Raymond Bagatsing, Richard Quan, Gary Estrada	Drama, romance	Discovery Films
Bobby Barbers, Parak	Augusto Salvador		Phillip Salvador, Herbert Bautista, Willie Revillame, John Regala,Charlene Gonzales, Roldan Aquino, Zandro Zamora,Rufa Mae Quinto, Amanda Page, Ricardo Cepeda, Ernie Zarate, Sophia Alonso, Odette Khan, Jeffrey Santos, Polly Cadsawan, Romeo Rivera, Conrad Poe, Joey Padilla, Whitney Tyson, Alfredo Lim	Action, Drama	Viva Films
Bubot, Kulang sa Panahon	Jose Balagtas		Tonton Gutierrez, Natasha Ledesma, Allona Amor, Venus Varga, Elizabeth Oropesa, Dick Israel, Mon Confiado	Erotic drama, romance	V-Rich Films
Calvento Files: The Movie	Laurenti Dyogi		Claudine Barretto, Rio Locsin, Diether Ocampo, Lito Pimentel	Crime, drama, thriller	Star Cinema
Cobra	Arturo San Agustin		Dan Fernandez, Ara Mina, Lito Legaspi	Action	Regal Films
Computer Kombat	Junn P. Cabreira		Aiza Seguerra, Spencer Reyes, Meryll Soriano	Adventure, comedy, sci-fi	MAQ Productions
Dahil Tanging Ikaw	Mac Alejandre		Bernadette Allyson, Donna Cruz, Richard De Dios	Romance	Viva Films
Dalaga na si Sabel	Ruben S. Abalos		Izza Ignacio, Ricky Belmonte, Efren Reyes Jr., Jean Saburit, Romano Vasquez, Gem Castillo, Roy Rodrigo	Erotic drama	Skorpion Films
Dimas at Magdalena	Dante Pangilinan		Rommel Padilla, Glydel Mercado	Action, romance	Jowell Films
Eseng ng Tondo	Augusto Salvador		Fernando Poe Jr., Ina Raymundo, Jenny Syquia	Action	Viva Films
Flames: The Movie	Jerry Lopez Sineneng; Khryss Adalia		Rico Yan, Claudine Barreto, Bojo Molina, Marvin Agustin, Jolina Magdangal	Romance	Star Cinema
Frame Up	Pepe Marcos		Raymart Santiago, Jessa Zaragoza, Ricardo Cepeda	Action	Cinemax Studios, OctoArts Films
Frats: Kapatiran... Katarungan!	Armando A. Reyes		Isko Moreno	Erotic	Alura Film
Go, Johnny Go!	Ipe Pelino		Johnny Abarrientos, Willie Revillame, Rochelle Barrameda	Comedy, sport	Regal Films
Halik	Don Escudero		Christopher de Leon, Alma Concepcion, Ruffa Gutierrez, Pinky Amador, Roy Rodrigo	Drama, romance	Available Light Productions, Regal Films
Hamog sa Magdamag	Ruben S. Abalos		Izza Ignacio, Renzo Cruz, Ricky Belmonte, Ramil Rodriguez, Glenda Garcia, Gino Ilustre	Erotic drama, romance	Skorpion Films
Hanggang Ngayon Ikay Minamahal	Ike Jarlego Jr.		Vilma Santos, Christopher de Leon, Antoinette Taus, Charito Solis, Pia Pilapil, Timmy Cruz, Melisse Santiago	Drama	Neo Films
Hawakan Mo Ako	Rico Mambo (Abbo Q. de la Cruz)		Klaudia Koronel, Leandro Baldemor, Mahalia Mendez, Roy Rodrigo	Erotic drama, romance	Available Light Productions, Regal Films
Home Along Da Riles 2	Johnny Manahan		Dolphy, Nova Villa, Babalu, Vandolph, Smokey Manaloto, Claudine Barretto, Gio Alvarez, Boy 2 Quizon, Subas Herrero, Palito, Rico Yan	Comedy	Star Cinema & RVQ Productions INC
Ipaglaban Mo II: The Movie	Rory B. Quintos		Carmina Villarroel, Aljon Jimenez, Chat Silayan, Charito Solis, Bembol Roco, Ronnie Lazaro	Crime, drama	Star Cinema
Kahit Hindi Turuan ang Puso	Frank G. Rivera		Tonton Gutierrez, Maria Sovietskaya Bacud, Roy Alvarez, Sylvia Sanchez, Vic Velaro, Tessie Villarama, Butch Gonzales, Tyrone Suarez	Erotic drama	Good Harvest Productions
Kamandag Ko ang Papatay Sa'yo!	Pepe Marcos		Ronnie Ricketts, Beth Tamayo, Eddie Gutierrez, Julio Diaz	Action	OctoArts Films
Kesong Puti	Mauro Gia Samonte		Klaudia Koronel, Anton Bernardo, Deborah Carpio, Fernando Montenegro, Roy Rodrigo, Lucita Soriano, Rustica Carpio	Erotic drama, romance	Seiko Films, Red Horse Productions
Kiliti	Neal "Buboy" Tan		Leandro Baldemor, Natasha Ledesma, Anton Bernardo, Isabel Reyes, Roy Rodrigo, Gina Pareño, Dencio Padilla	Comedy, erotic, romance	Seiko Films
Kirot sa Puso	F.C. Gargantilla		Ana Capri, Ramona Revilla, Roy Rodrigo, Gloria Diaz, Rachel Lobangco, Marita Zobel	Erotic drama, romance	MAQ Productions
Kriselda (Sabik sa 'Yo)	Rico Mambo (Abbo Q. de la Cruz)		Lara Morena, Tonton Gutierrez, Emilio Garcia, Celina Cortez, Aileen Angeles, Anthony Cortez, Dencio Padilla, Evangeline Pascual, Luz Valdez	Erotic drama, romance	Canary Films
Kulang Ka Lang sa Lambing	Ruben S. Abalos		Sabrina M., Alma Soriano, Isabel Reyes, Roy Rodrigo, Lito Legaspi	Erotic drama, romance	Kara Films
Iskalawag, Ang Batas ay Batas	Francis Posadas		Raymart Santiago, Gelli de Belen	Action	Star Cinema
Jacob C.I.S.	Leonardo L. Garcia		Ace Vergel, Ara Mina, Donita Rose, Lito Legaspi, Daniel Pasia, Bob Soler	Action	Regal Films
Lihim ni Madonna	Celso Ad. Castillo		Sunshine Cruz, Celia Rodriguez, Tonton Gutierrez, Anthony Cortez, Dick Israel, Roldan Aquino, Paquito Diaz	Drama, thriller	Four Acres Films, Inc.
Linggo Lang ang Pahinga	Humilde "Meek" Roxas		Klaudia Koronel, Anton Bernardo, Alma Soriano, Margarita Milan	Erotic drama, romance	Seiko Films
Magkapalad	Dante Pangilinan		Jay Manalo, Rufa Mae Quinto, Ramon Christopher, Ynez Veneracion	Action, romance	Falcon Films
Magic Kingdom: Ang Alamat ng Damortis	Peque Gallaga and Lore Reyes		Jason Salcedo, Junell Hernando, Janus del Prado, Anne Curtis, Mark Gil, William Martinez, Ramon Christopher, Maricel Laxa	Fantasy	Viva Films and Neo Films
Manananggal in Manila	Mario O'Hara		Tonton Gutierrez, Eric Fructuoso, Mike Magat, Angelika dela Cruz, Aiza Seguerra, Alma Concepcion	Horror	MAQ Productions
Mapusok	Mel Chionglo		Rosanna Roces, Julio Diaz, Bodjie Pascua, Eva Darren, Ihman Esturco, Sherry Lara, Michelle Ortega	Erotic drama, romance	OctoArts Films and Cinemax Studios
Mariano Mison... NBI	Joey del Rosario		Eddie Garcia, Elizabeth Oropesa, Ricky Davao, Daniel Fernando, Gardo Versoza, Kier Legaspi, Rez Cortez, Bob Soler	Action	Star Cinema
Maritoni Suarez, G.R.O.	Neal "Buboy" Tan		Rita Magdalena, Ynez Veneracion, Daniel Fernando, Philip Henson, Katrina Paula, Rachel Roa, Sheila Sanchez, Joey Galvez, Nick Aladin	Erotic drama	Canary Films
Matang Agila	Teddy Gomez, Phillip Ko		Monsour del Rosario, Anjanette Abayari, Alex David, Zoren Legaspi, Brando Legaspi, Lito Legaspi, Bembol Roco	Action	Regal Films
Mauna Ka, Susunod Ako	Jun Aristorenas	Vicente G. Del Rosario III Veronique Del Rosario-Corpus	Eddie Garcia, Janno Gibbs, Paquito Diaz, Michelle Aldana, Bernadette Allyson, Dindi Gallardo, George Estregan Jr., Romy Diaz, Jun Aristorenas	Action, Comedy	Viva Films
Mga Babae sa Isla Azul	Jerry O. Tirazona		Isko Moreno, Patrick dela Rosa, Gem Castillo, Alma Soriano, Ynez Veneracion	Erotic drama, romance	Leo Films
Milagros	Marilou Diaz-Abaya		Sharmaine Arnaiz, Dante Rivero, Elizabeth Oropesa, Joel Torre, Raymond Bagatsing, Nonie Buencamino	Drama, romance	Merdeka Film Productions
Modelo	Cesar SB Abella		Alma Soriano, Allan Paule, Jeffrey Gonzales, Marita Zobel, Sheila Sanchez, Pinky Roces	Erotic drama	Shangten Films
Nakalimot sa Pag-ibig	Artemio Marquez		Angela Marquez, Aya Medel, Carla Moreno, Leo Rabago, Marissa Delgado	Erotic drama, romance	Golden Tower Films
Nakaw na Sandali	Manny Castaneda		Joel Torre, Jean Garcia, Gina Pareño, Maria Sovietskaya, Toffee Calma	Drama, romance	MAQ Productions
Nagmumurang Kamatis Kumakasa Pa!	Luciano B. Carlos, Cirio H. Santiago		Eddie Garcia, Boots Anson-Roa, Michelle Parton	Comedy	Premiere Entertainment Productions
Nakawin Mo ang Aking Puso	Emmanuel H. Borlaza		Glydel Mercado, Raymond Keannu, Mike Magat, Adonis Laxamana, Joanne Pascual, Bella Flores	Action, romance, erotic	MAQ Productions
The Onyok Velasco Story	Felix E. Dalay		Onyok Velasco, Ina Raymundo, Ace Espinosa, Dindo Arroyo	Sports drama	Viva Films
Paano ang Puso Ko?	Rory Quintos		Judy Ann Santos, Wowie de Guzman, Rico Yan	Drama	Star Cinema
Paano Kung Wala Ka Na	Joey Romero		Snooky Serna, Rustom Padilla, Sunshine Cruz	Romantic drama	MAQ Productions
Padre Kalibre	Val Iglesias		Eddie Garcia, Monsour del Rosario, Eddie Gutierrez	Action	Regal Films
Pilya	Neal Tan	Allan Gilbert	Rita Magdalena, Jorge Estregan, Sara Gomez, Ursula Ortiz, Rey "PJ" Abellana, Erwin Montes, Robert Martin, Rey Roldan, Jinky Oda, Miguel Moreno	Erotic drama	Taurus Films
Pusakal	Toto Natividad		Cesar Montano, Rosanna Roces	Action	Solar Films
Rizal sa Dapitan	Tikoy Aguiluz	Tikoy Aguiluz	Albert Martinez, Amanda Page, Candy Pangilinan, Rustica Carpio, Tess Dumpit, Roy Alvarez, Nonie Buencamino, Junnel Hernando, Chris Michelena, Jaime Fabregas	Romantic period drama	Movpix International, Inc.
Sa Iyo ang Itaas, Sa Akin ang Ibaba	Efren Reyes Jr.		Izza Ignacio, Rita Magdalena, Roy Rodrigo, Berting Labra, Dexter Doria	Erotic drama	Skorpion Films
Sambahin ang Puri Ko	Mauro Gia Samonte		Sabrina M., Ramona Revilla, Isabel Reyes, Tonton Gutierrez, Rey Abellana, Lito Legaspi, Beverly Salviejo, Perla Bautista	Erotic drama, romance	Kara Films
The Sarah Balabagan Story	Joel Lamangan		Vina Morales	Crime, drama	Viva Films
The Secret of Katrina Salazar	Karlo Montero	Anna Theresa	Rita Magdalena, Romano Vasquez, Philip Henson, Sheila Sanchez, Victor Vargas, Robert Delos Reyes, Ariel Reyes, Jimmy Concepcion, Emil Cristobal, Sofia Santos	Erotic drama	Taurus Films
Selosa	Mel Chionglo		Rosanna Roces, Patrick Guzman, Emilio Garcia, Lara Morena, Evangeline Pascual, Alicia Alonzo, Susan Africa	Erotic drama, romance	OctoArts Films
Sgt. Victor Samson: Akin Ang Batas	Mike Relon Makiling		Jestoni Alarcon, Eula Valdez, Ramon Zamora, Lito Legaspi, Bob Soler, Rex Lapid, Mia Pratts	Action	GP Films
Shake, Rattle & Roll VI	Maurice Carvajal, Anton Juan, Frank G. Rivera		Episode 1: "Telebisyon" -; Episode 2: "Tulay" -; Episode 3: "Buwan" -	Horror	MAQ Productions
Simaron: Barya Lang ang Halaga ng Ulo Mo	Jun Aristorenas		Ace Espinosa, Edu Manzano, Amanda Page, Mark Gil, Maritoni Fernandez, Jon Achaval, Sofia Alfonso, Chinggoy Alonso, Jun Aristorenas	Action, romance	Viva Films
Shoot, My Darlin	Hitoshi Ozawa	Hitoshi Ozawa	Vivian Hsu, Hitoshi Ozawa, Masahiro Yamashita	Crime	Eisei Gekijo; Japanese-Filipino co-production
Super Ranger Kids	Rogelio Salvador		Rodney Shattara, Joseph Reyes, Paul Burns, Sarah Polvireni, Thea "Rose" Tupaz, Ara Mina, Ruel Vernal, Allan Paule	Fantasy	Regal Films
Takot Ako sa Darling Ko	Leo Valdez		Joey de Leon, April Boy Regino, Jenny Syquia	Comedy	Neo Films
Tapang Sa Tapang	Francis Posadas		Lito Lapid, Jess Lapid Jr., Dick Israel, Efren Reyes Jr., Mansueto Velasco, Bob Soler	Action	Star Cinema
Tapatan ng Tapang	Augusto Buenaventura		Lito Lapid, Dante Varona, Maricel Morales, Jess Lapid Jr., Lito Legaspi, Zandro Zamora, Efren Lapid, Rex Lapid, Joe Lapid	Action	EDL Productions and Moviearts Films
Tekkie			Jestoni Alarcon, Romy Diaz, Maita Sanchez, Edgar Mande, Sienna Olaso, Krista Maree Papa, Jet Estregan	Science fiction	
Thalia	Artemio Marquez		Rita Magdalena, Gloria Sevilla, Amado Cortez, Leo Rabago, Adel Marquez	Erotic drama, romance	Golden Tower Films
Totoy Mola	Rico Mambo (Abbo Q. de la Cruz)		Jay Manalo, Dindi Gallardo, Sabrina M., Aya Medel, Cyndi Moreno	Erotic drama, romance	Scorpio Films
Trabaho Lang Dear, Walang Personalan	Tony Cruz		Leo Martinez, Joyce Jimenez, Amanda Page	Comedy	Neo Films
Violeta, Tapat Magmahal	Cesar SB Abella		Alma Soriano, Jeffery Gonzales, Cheska Moreno, Myka Montano	Erotic drama, romance	El Niño Films
Yes Darling: Walang Matigas na Pulis 2	Pepe Marcos		Ramon 'Bong' Revilla Jr., Lani Mercado, Jimmy Santos, Tessie Tomas, Chuck Perez, Mandy Ochoa, Rosanna Roces, Whitney Tyson, Ramon Zamora, Romeo Rivera	Action, comedy	Regal Films

== 1998 ==
Film	Director	Producer	Cast	Genre	Company
1998
Ala Eh con Bisoy, Hale Hale Hoy! (Laging Panalo ang Mga Unggoy)	Efren Jarlego		Leo Martinez, Redford White, Ronalisa Cheng, Eula Valdez, Jessie Diaz, Paula Peralejo	Drama	Star Cinema
Alyas Boy Tigas: Ang Probinsyanong Wais	Tony Y. Reyes		Willie Revillame, Via Veloso, Criselda Volks	Action	Diamante Productions
Ang Erpat Kong Astig	Felix E. Dalay		Jinggoy Estrada, Carmina Villarroel, Rufa Mae Quinto, Bea Bueno	Action	Viva Films
Ang Kilabot at si Miss Pakipot	Dante Pangilinan, Ferren Salumbides		Rommel Padilla, Rita Magdalena, George Estregan Jr., Katrina Paula, Rey Roldan, Jimmy Concepcion	Action	Canary Films
Ang Lalaki sa Buhay ni Selya	Carlos Siguion-Reyna	Charo Santos-Concio; Malou N. Santos; Armida Siguion-Reyna	Rosanna Roces, Ricky Davao, Gardo Versoza, Allan Paule, Eva Darren, Renato del Prado	Erotic drama, romance	Star Cinema
Ang Maton at Ang Showgirl	Deo Fajardo Jr.		Michael Rivero, Rita Magdalena, Jorge Estergan, Dante Rivero, Ina Alegre, Alma Soriano, Daria Ramirez, Mikey Arroyo, Conrad Poe	Action, erotic drama	EDL Productions, Diamond Jade Films
Anting-Anting	Ipe Pelino		Michael V., Jessa Zaragoza, Edu Manzano, Ronnie Ricketts, Patrick Guzman, Manny Castañeda, Lloyd Zaragoza	Comedy, romance	OctoArts Films and Cinemax Studios
Armadong Hudas	Augusto Salvador		Ian Veneracion, Jessa Zaragoza, Tonton Gutierrez, Ronaldo Valdez, Lito Legaspi, Ramon Recto, RG Gutierrez, Edgar Mande, Boy Roque, and Polly Cadsawan	Action	OctoArts Films and GMA Films
Babae sa Bintana	Chito S. Roño		Richard Gomez, Rosanna Roces, John Estrada, Johnny Manahan, Efren Reyes Jr., Raymond Keannu	Drama	Regal Films
Babae sa Bubungang Lata	Mario O'Hara		Aya Medel, Mike Magat, Renzo Cruz, Randy Ramos, Allen Dizon, Anita Linda	Erotic drama, romance	Good Harvest Productions
Balasubas	Augusto Salvador		Ace Espinosa, Ramon Christopher, Tonton Gutierrez, Pia Pilapil, Maricel Morales	Action	Neo Films
Bata, Bata... Pa'no Ka Ginawa?	Chito S. Roño		Vilma Santos, Albert Martinez, Ariel Rivera, Raymond Bagatsing, Carlo Aquino, Serena Dalrymple, Cherry Pie Picache, Angel Aquino	Drama	ABS-CBN Film Productions
Bellas: Bb. Bea Belleza	Cesar S.B. Abella		Alma Soriano, Isabel Reyes, Jeffrey Gonzales, Keith Lacson, Ian Crosby, Odette Khan	Erotic drama	El Niño Films, Shangten Films
Ben Delubyo	Ike Jarlego		Bong Revilla, Charlene Gonzales, Ronaldo Valdez, Roy Alvarez, Joko Diaz	Action	Neo Films, RRJ Films
Bilibid or Nut	Jett Espiritu		Niño Muhlach, Efren Reyes Jr.	Comedy	ATB-4 Films
Buhawi Jack	Teddy Gomez, Phillip Ko		Monsour del Rosario, Carmina Villarroel, Niño Muhlach, Ara Mina, Chuck Perez	Action, fantasy	Regal Films
Cariño Brutal	Romy Suzara		Rosanna Roces, Daisy Reyes, Roy Alvarez, Lucita Soriano	Action	Premiere Entertainment Productions
Code Name: Bomba	Efren C. Piñon		Monsour del Rosario, Ara Mina, Chuck Perez	Action	Regal Films
Curacha, Ang Babaeng Walang Pahinga	Chito S. Roño		Rosanna Roces, Jaclyn Jose, Ara Mina, Ruby Moreno, Lito Legaspi, Dick Israel, Roy Alvarez, Mike Magat, Lucita Soriano, Maureen Mauricio, Tito Arevalo, Richard Bonnin	Erotic drama	Regal Films
Dahil ba sa Kanya?	Don Escudero		Aga Muhlach, Mikee Cojuangco, Onemig Bondoc	Drama, romance	Viva Films
Dama de Noche	Lorenzo "Lore" Reyes		Ynez Veneracion, Mark Gil, Jaclyn Jose	Erotic drama	Viva Films
Dr. X on the Air	Felix Dalay		Leo Martinez, Criselda Volks, Daisy Reyes, Alicia Lane, Veronica Veron, Berting Labra, Conrad Poe, Lucita Soriano	Comedy, erotic	Falcon Films
Gagawin Ko ang Lahat	Tata Esteban		Anjanette Abayari, Tonton Gutierrez, Teresa Loyzaga, Adonis Laxamana, Lovely Rivero	Action	Good Harvest Productions
Gangland	Peque Gallaga, Lore Reyes		Ryan Eigenmann, Jason Salcedo, Junell Hernando, Lara Fabregas, Blakdyak, Gabby Eigenmann, Erwin Mendoza	Action	Neo Films
Ginto't Pilak	Romy V. Suzara	Hermie Go (Associate Producer), Brenda M. Bayhon (Supervising Producer), Vicente G. Del Rosario and Veronique Del Rosario-Corpus (Producer), Vic Del Rosario Jr (Executive Producer)	Rudy Fernandez, Rosanna Roces, Jay Manalo, Roldan Aquino, Ruel Vernal, Bong Villafuerte, Gabriel Romulo, Rene Hawkins, Robert Miller, RG Gutierrez, June Hidalgo (as Jun Hidalgo), July Hidalgo, Bernard Atienza, Polly Cadsawan	Action	Viva Films
Hiling	Jose Javier Reyes		Camille Prats, Shaina Magdayao, Serena Dalrymple	Drama	Star Cinema
Hiwaga ng Panday	Carlo J. Caparas		Jinggoy Estrada, Kris Aquino, Robert Arevalo, Gloria Sevilla, Bernadette Allyson, Nards Belen, Benedict Aquino, Martin Gutierrez, Caloy Salvador, Bobby Henson, Celso Ad. Castillo	Fantasy	Golden Lions Films
Honey, Nasa Langit Na Ba Ako?	Edgardo Vinarao	Mel Mendoza-Del Rosario (story and screenplay)	Janno Gibbs, Regine Velasquez, Mickey Ferriols	Comedy	Neo Films
Ikaw Na Sana: The Movie	Mac Alejandre		Bobby Andrews, Angelu de Leon, Carmi Martin, Gladys Reyes	Drama	Neo Films
I'm Sorry, My Love	Joyce Bernal		Judy Ann Santos, Onemig Bondoc, Gladys Reyes	Drama	Viva Films
Init ng Laman	Tata Esteban		Sunshine Cruz, Toffee Calma, John Apacible, Hazel Espinosa, Melissa Mendez, Kathy Suarez, Archie Ventosa	Crime, erotic drama	Good Harvest Productions
José Rizal	Marilou Diaz-Abaya		Cesar Montano, Gloria Diaz, Joel Torre, Jaime Fabregas, Gardo Versoza, Gina Alajar, Tanya Gomez, Ronnie Lazaro, Subas Herrero, Pen Medina, Chin-Chin Gutierrez, Monique Wilson, Jhong Hilario, Mickey Ferriols	Epic biographical drama	GMA Films
Kasal-kasalan Sakalan	Edgardo Vinarao		Judy Ann Santos, Wowie de Guzman, Gladys Reyes, Christopher Roxas, Elizabeth Oropesa, Ai-Ai delas Alas, Tia Pusit, Berting Labra	Drama, romance	Solar Films
Kay Tagal Kang Hinintay	Rory Quintos		Judy Ann Santos, Rico Yan, Dante Rivero, Gloria Sevilla, Yayo Aguila, William Lorenzo, Nikki Valdez, Jennifer Sevilla	Romance	Star Cinema
Kid Manalo, Akin ang Ulo Mo	Augusto Salvador		Gardo Versoza, Tonton Gutierrez, Glydel Mercado, Stella Ruiz, Dick Israel, King Gutierrez, Lara Morena, Bob Soler, Romy Diaz	Action	Mahogany Pictures
Kung Liligaya Ka sa Piling ng Iba	Lando Jacob and William Pascual		Isabel Reyes, Ynez Veneracion, Pia Paula, Kristina Kasten, Gino Antonio, Simon Ibarra	Erotic drama	Starlight Films
Laban Ko Ito... Walang Dapat Madamay	Toto Natividad		Jestoni Alarcon, Alma Concepcion, Tirso Cruz III, Rez Cortez, Dencio Padilla, Dindo Arroyo	Action	Diamond Harvest Pictures
Magandang Hatinggabi	Laurenti Dyogi		Angelika Dela Cruz, Jericho Rosales, Angelica Panganiban, Bojo Molina, Mylene Dizon, Marvin Agustin, Diether Ocampo, Jaclyn Jose, Eula Valdez, Allan Paule, Nonie Buencamino	Comedy, horror, romance	Star Cinema
Marahas, Walang kilalang Batas	Francis Posadas		Raymart Santiago, Raymond Bagatsing, Beth Tamayo	Action	GMA Films, OctoArts Films
Masarap ang Unang Kagat	Mike Macarena Jr.		Karla Estrada, Sabrina M., Alma Soriano, Pia Paula, Kristina Kasten, Leo Rabago, Jojo Abellana, Simon Ibarra, Sammy Lagmay	Erotic drama, romance	Starlight Films
Miss... Gabi Na!!!	Dante Pangilinan		Ynez Veneracion, Daniel Fernando, Rhea Malonzo, Karen Villar, Yda Manzano	Erotic drama	Taurus Films
Muling Ibalik ang Tamis ng Pag-ibig	Boots Plata		Judy Ann Santos, Wowie de Guzman, Dominic Ochoa, Cheska Garcia, Mel Martinez, Carlos Agassi	Drama, romance	Star Cinema
Nagbibinata	Jose Javier Reyes		Patrick Garcia, Kristopher Peralta, John Lloyd Cruz, Marc Solis, Baron Geisler, Paula Peralejo, Kaye Abad, Nikki Valdez, Kristine Hermosa, Carol Banawa	Drama	Star Cinema
Nanggigigil Ako Sa Iyong Kagandahan	Leo Valdez		Ogie Alcasid, Alma Concepcion, Earl Ignacio	Comedy	Good Harvest Unlimited
Notoryus	Toto Natividad	Toto Natividad and Reily Pablo Santiago (Line Producer), Malou N. Santos (Supervising Producer), Charo Santos-Concio (Executive Producer)	Victor Neri, Rachel Alejandro, Aya Medel, John Regala, Gardo Versoza, Johnny Vicar, Kier Legaspi, Tony Carreon, Boy Gomez, Brando Legaspi, Usman Hassim, Boy Sta. Maria, Gilda Aragon, Roldan Aquino, Jojo Chico, Rando Almanzor, and George Estregan Jr.	Action	Star Cinema
Pagdating ng Panahon	Eric Quizon		Eric Quizon, Aiko Melendez, Armando Goyena, Gina Pareño, Koko Trnindad, Shaina Magdayao	Drama, romance	Garibaldi International
Pagbabalik ng Probinsyano	Ronwaldo Reyes		Fernando Poe Jr., Anjanette Abayari, Paquito Diaz	Action	FPJ Productions
Pahiram Kahit Sandali	Maryo J. de los Reyes		Christopher de Leon, Ara Mina, Alice Dixson	Drama	Regal Films
Pisil	Humilde "Meek" Roxas		Klaudia Koronel, Rey Abellana, Camille Roxas, Divina del Rio, Leandro Baldemor, Rodel Velayo	Erotic drama	Seiko Films
Puso ng Pasko	Peque Gallaga and Lore Reyes		Jolina Magdangal, Jaclyn Jose, Rita Avila, Cherry Pie Picache, Edu Manzano, Jason Salcedo, Anna Larrucea, Emman Abeleda, Justin Simoy, Korinne Lirio	Comedy, fantasy	Star Cinema
Pusong Mamon	Joel Lamangan and Eric Quizon		Lorna Tolentino, Albert Martinez, Eric Quizon, Alvin Anson, Eugene Domingo	Drama, romance	Kaizz Ventures, Neo Films
Sa Muling Pagpatak ng Hamog	Cesar S.B. Abella		Alma Soriano, Isabel Reyes, Jeffrey Gonzales, Simon Ibarra, Odette Khan	Erotic drama	El Niño Films, Gift Productions
Sa Piling ng Iba	Lando Jacob, William Pascual		Daisy Reyes, Patrick Guzman, Giorgia Ortega	Drama	Regal Films
Sa Pusod ng Dagat	Marilou Diaz-Abaya		Jomari Yllana, Chin Chin Gutierrez, Elizabeth Oropesa, LJ Moreno, Apple Zuñiga, Jhong Hilario	Drama	GMA Films and Film Experts Inc.
Sabong	Felix E. Dalay		Jay Manalo, Alicia Lane, Criselda Volks	Drama	Falcon Films
Sagad sa Init	Uro Q. dela Cruz		Jomari Yllana, Ara Mina, Sharmaine Arnaiz, LJ Moreno, Orestes Ojeda, Jackie Castillejos, Randy Gamier, Hector Gomez, Maita Soriano	Erotic drama, romance	Regal Films
Sana... Pag-ibig Na	Jeffrey Jeturian		Angel Aquino, Gerard Madrid, Nida Blanca, Chinggoy Alonso, Julio Diaz, Pinky Amador	Romance	Good Harvest Productions
Selda 14 (Mga Babaeng Makasalanan)	Teddy Gomez		Ynez Veneracion, Chuck Perez, Katrina Paula, Rona Rivera, Bing Davao, Dexter Doria, Justine Alarcon, Ronald Ty, Ronnie Lazaro	Erotic drama, romance	Good Harvest Productions
Serafin Geronimo: Ang Kriminal ng Baryo Concepcion	Lav Diaz		Raymond Bagatsing, Tonton Gutierrez, Angel Aquino, Ana Capri, Dindi Gallardo	Action, crime, drama	Good Harvest Unlimited
Silaw	Mark Reyes	Vicente Del Rosario III Veronique Del Rosario-Corpus	Onemig Bondoc, Michael Flores, Red Sternberg, Bernadette Allyson, Rica Peralejo, Jake Roxas, Ronaldo Valdez, Ernie Zarate, Jaime Fabregas, Pocholo Montes, Ace Espinosa, Sophia Alonso, Ricardo Cepeda, Brando Legaspi, Lee Robin Salazar, Mon Confiado Bobby Andrews	Action Romantic Comedy	Viva Films
Sonny Segovia: Lumakad Ka sa Apoy	Jose N. Carreon		Mark Anthony Fernandez, Giselle Toengi, Alma Moreno	Action	Regal Films
Strebel: Gestapo ng Maynila	Bebong Osorio		Jinggoy Estrada, Amanda Page, Beth Tamayo, Dante Rivero, Bob Soler, Brando Legaspi, Dick Israel, Baldo Marro	Action	Viva Films
Sugat sa Puri	Jose Balagtas		Jeffrey Santos, Alma Soriano, Karen Villa, Ramon Christopher, Jess Lapid Jr., Dick Israel, King Gutierrez	Action	Armatiz Films
Tataynic	Ben Feleo		Dolphy, Zsa Zsa Padilla, Vandolph	Comedy	RVQ Productions
Tatlo... Magkasalo	Carlos Siguion-Reyna		Tonton Gutierrez, Rita Avila, Gina Alajar, Sharmaine Arnaiz, Ara Mina	Drama, romance	Reyna Films, Star Cinema
Tatsulok	Tikoy Aguiluz		Albert Martinez, Amanda Page, Elizabeth Oropesa	Erotic drama, romance	Viva Films
Trip Kita, Type Mo Ba?	Xenio "Jun" Cudia		Ina Raymundo, Earl Ignacio, Michelle Ortega, Jovit Moya, Andrew Tang	Comedy, romance	Rainbow Films
Tulak ng Bibig, Kabig ng Dibdib	Joey del Rosario	Vicente G. Del Rosario III; Veronique Del Rosario-Corpus	Robin Padilla, Maricel Soriano, Piel Morena, Ricardo Cepeda, Dick Israel, Renzo Cruz, Emilio Garcia, Jorge Estregan, Berting Labra, Caridad Sanchez	Action, romance, comedy	Viva Films; FLT Films International
Tumakas Ka... sa Mundong Makasalanan	Karlo Montero		Ynez Veneracion, Lucas Leonardo, Karen Villar, Yda Manzano	Erotic drama	Taurus Films
Wangbu	Toto Natividad	Toto Natividad	Jay Manalo, Dindi Gallardo, Amanda Page, Julio Diaz, Brando Legaspi	Action drama	Neo Films
Warfreak	Cesar Montano; Toto Natividad	Vicente G. del Rosario III; Veronique del Rosario-Corpus	Cesar Montano, Ace Espinosa, Susan Jane Ritter, Mickey Ferriols, Jess Lapid Jr., Rez Cortez, Joonee Gamboa, Atoy Co, Rommel Montano, Richard Bonnin	Action drama	Neo Films

== 1999 ==
Film	Director	Producer	Cast	Genre	Company
1999
Akin Ka Ngayong Gabi	Rolly Bernardo		Katrina Paula, Toffee Calma, Kristina Kasten, Poppo Lontoc, Lyra Lorena, Nick Allasin	Erotic drama	Taurus Film
Ako ang Lalagot sa Hininga Mo	Rene Balan		Dan Alvaro, Dante Varona, Rufa Mae Quinto, Daisy Reyes, Erick Esguerra, Bernard Bonnin, Maggie de la Riva, Erie Zarate, Gabriel Romulo, Nick Romano, Romy Diaz, Roberto Gonzales	Action	MHR Productions
Ako'y Ibigin Mo... Lalaking Matapang	Lito Lapid		Lito Lapid, Vina Morales, Rustom Padilla, Jess Lapid Jr., Emilio Garcia	Action	FLT Films
Aliw, Masarap na Lason	Cesar S.B. Abella		Sabrina M., Alma Soriano, Mike Magat, Ian Crosby, Odette Khan	Erotic drama, romance	El Niño Films, Gift Productions
Alyas Big Time	Pong Mercado		Zoren Legaspi, Ana Capri, Via Veloso	Action	Regal Films
Alyas Pogi: Ang Pagbabalik	Joey Del Rosario	Malou N. Santos	Bong Revilla, Ara Mina, Carlo Aquino, Tonton Gutierrez, Efren Reyes Jr., Ray Ventura, Jeffrey Santos, Gio Alvarez	Action	Star Cinema Productions Inc.
Anakan Mo Ako	Humilde "Meek" Roxas		Anton Bernardo, Klaudia Koronel, Gino Illustre	Erotic drama	Seiko Films
Ang Boyfriend Kong Pari	Ronnie Ricketts		Ronnie Ricketts, Vina Morales, Zoren Legaspi	Action, sport	Crystal Films, EDL Productions
Ang Kabit ni Mrs. Montero	Peque Gallaga and Lorenzo "Lore" Reyes		Edu Manzano, Sunshine Cruz, Gardo Versoza, Patricia Javier	Drama, romantic	Viva Films
Anino	Teddy Cruz		Roi Vinzon, Sandra Gomez, John Regala, Melissa Mendez, Maita Soriano, Cesar Angeles	Action	Silver Star Entertainment
Asin at Paminta	Jun Aristorenas		Eddie Garcia, Blakdyak, Rufa Mae Quinto, Patricia Javier	Action	Viva Films
Askal (Asong Kalye)	John Regala		John Regala, Beth Tamayo, Mat Ranillo III, William Martinez, Mikee Villanueva, Bob Soler, Dick Israel	Action	JVS Productions
Bakit Pa?	Jose Javier Reyes		Jessa Zaragoza, Diether Ocampo, Troy Montero	Drama	OctoArts Films
Banatan	Uro Q. Dela Cruz		Jomari Yllana, Ara Mina, Karla Estrada	Action, drama	Regal Films
Basta't Ikaw Nanginginig Pa	Tony Y. Reyes		Vic Sotto, Rosanna Roces, Nova Villa	Comedy, Drama, Romance	Viva Films, M-Zet Production
Batang Pro	Lito Casaje		Aila Marie, Gerard Madrid, Tommy Abuel, Julio Diaz, John Arcilla, Elizabeth Oropesa, Melissa Mendez, Anita Linda, Ana Capri, Leo Rabago, Roy Rodrigo	Erotic drama	Good Harvest
Bilib Ako Sayo	Eddie Rodriguez		Robin Padilla, Rustom Padilla	Action	Viva Films
Bulaklak ng Maynila	Joel Lamangan		Christopher de Leon, Elizabeth Oropesa, Angelu de Leon, Jomari Yllana, Bembol Roco, Jake Roxas	Action	Viva Films
Burger Boys	Lav Diaz		Gerard Madrid, Marcus Madrigal, Marco Salvador and Tricia Roman	Action, comedy	Good Harvest
Burlesk King	Mel Chionglo		Leonardo Litton, Rodel Velayo, Nini Jacinto, Raymond Bagatsing, Elizabeth Oropesa, Cherry Pie Picache, Gino Illustre	Erotic drama	Seiko Films
Burlesk Queen Ngayon	Jose N. Carreon		Ina Raymundo, Leandro Baldemor, Renzo Cruz, Allan Sia, Alvin Anson, Leonardo Litton, Teresa Loyzaga, Pia Paula, Camille Roxas, Alma Soriano, Jean Saburit	Erotic drama, romance	FLT Films International
Bullet	Cesar Montano	Vicente G. Del Rosario III, Veronique Del Rosario-Corpus	Cesar Montano, Sunshine Cruz, Jay Manalo, Spanky Manikan, Cris Vertido, Celia Rodriguez, Amy Austria, Rommel Montano, Jun Arenas, Gerry Roman	Action	Viva Films
College Girls	Robert Delos Reyes		Hazel Espinosa, Jasmine Tolentino, Rosemarie Rose, Nicko Montes, Erwin Montes	Action	Taurus Films
Dahil May Isang Ikaw	Joyce Bernal	Mel Mendoza-Del Rosario (story & screenplay)	Regine Velasquez, Aga Muhlach	Drama Comedy	Viva Films
Di Pwedeng Hindi Puwede	Francis Posadas		Robin Padilla, Vina Morales, Bayani Agbayani, Dante Rivero, Kier Legaspi, Bembol Roco	Action, Comedy, Drama	Star Cinema, FLT Films International
Dibdiban Ang Laban	Neil "Buboy" Tan		Gary Estrada, Anjanette Abayari, Bernard Bonnin, Maggie de la Riva, Dante Varona, Julius Henson, Brando Legaspi	Action	MHR Productions
Dito sa Puso Ko	Eric Quizon		Judy Ann Santos, Wowie de Guzman, Eric Quizon, Vanessa del Bianco, Troy Montero, Gina Pareño, John Lapus	Romance	Viva Films
Droga, Ang Pagtatapat ng mga Babaing Addict	Celso Ad. Castillo		Rita Magdalena, Aya Medel, Emilio Garcia, Ramona Revilla, Roy Rodrigo, Leo Rabago	Erotic drama	Gloanne Films, EDL Productions
D'Sisters: Nuns of the Above	Tony Y. Reyes		Vic Sotto, Michael V., Beth Tamayo, Lara Morena	Comedy	GMA Films, M-Zet Productions, OctoArts Films
Dugo ng Birhen, El Kapitan	Rico Maria Ilarde		Monsour del Rosario, Klaudia Koronel, Mark Gil, Charlie Davao	Fantasy, Horror, Thriller	Good Harvest
Esperanza: The Movie	Jerry Lopez Sineneng		Judy Ann Santos, Wowie de Guzman, Piolo Pascual, Dante Rivero, Charo Santos-Concio, Joel Torre, Marvin Agustin, Lito Legaspi, Bembol Roco, Elizabeth Oropesa	Drama	Star Cinema
Ekis: Walang Tatakas	Erik Matti		Albert Martinez, Sunshine Cruz, Raymond Bagatsing, Ace Espinosa, Jaime Fabregas, Ryan Eigenmann	Action, erotic drama	Viva Films
Favorite Subject: Sex Education	Mike Macarena Jr.		Sabrina M., Roy Rodrigo, Simon Ibarra, Angela Velez, Pia Paula	Erotic drama, romance	Starlight Films
Gamugamong Dagat	Tata Esteban		Gary Estrada, Klaudia Koronel, Leandro Baldemor, Tonton Gutierrez, Yda Manzano, Bembol Roco	Erotic drama, romance	Regal Films
Gimik: The Reunion	Laurenti Dyogi		Judy Ann Santos, Rico Yan, Jolina Magdangal, Marvin Agustin, G. Toengi, Diether Ocampo, Mylene Dizon, Bojo Molina	Comedy, drama	Star Cinema
Hey Babe	Joyce Bernal		Jolina Magdangal, Marvin Agustin	Romance	Star Cinema
Higit Pa Sa Buhay Ko	Maryo J. delos Reyes		Christopher de Leon, Aiko Melendez, Maricel Laxa	Comedy	Regal Films, MAQ Productions
Hilig ng Katawan	Ces Evangelista		Aya Medel, Allen Dizon, Hazel Espinosa, Roy Rodrigo, Mark Jacinto	Erotic drama, romance	Good Harvest
Hubad sa Ilalim ng Buwan	Lav Diaz		Klaudia Koronel, Elizabeth Oropesa, Joel Torre, Julio Diaz, Isabel Granada, Mike Magat	Erotic drama	Good Harvest
Huwag Po... Huwag Po!	F.C. Gargantilla		Hazel Espinosa, John Apacible, Allen Dizon, Zoltan Amore, Lucas Leonardo	Erotic drama	Good Harvest
Ikaw Lamang	Mac Alejandre		Kim delos Santos, Dino Guevarra, Dina Bonnevie, Melisse Santiago, Anne Curtis, Chubi de Rosario, Candy Pangilinan, Mel Martinez, Katya Santos, Lindsay Custodio, Assunta de Rossi	Romance	Viva Films
Isusumbong Kita sa Tatay Ko...	Boots Plata	Charo Santos-Concio, Malou Santos	Fernando Poe Jr., Judy Ann Santos	Action comedy	Star Cinema
Junior Quiapo	Dante Pangilinan		Chuck Perez, Allysa Alvarez, Orestes Ojeda, Mat Ranillo III, Maita Soriano	Action	Regal Films
Kaagaw	Rolly Bernardo and Robert delos Reyes		Rita Magdalena, Ynez Veneracion, Katrina Paula	Erotic drama	Taurus Films
Kahapon May Dalawang Bata (Yesterday Children)	Carlos Siguion-Reyna		Ara Mina, Tonton Gutierrez, Pen Medina, Ray Ventura, Jennifer Sevilla, Eva Darren, Carlo Aquino	Drama	Reyna Films
Kalaro	Dante Javier		Ynez Veneracion, Hazel Espinosa, Rey 'PJ' Abellana	Drama	Amaritz Films International
Katawan	Abbo De La Cruz		Christopher de Leon, Rosanna Roces, Bobby Andrews, Daniella, Leandro Baldemor, Dindi Gallardo	Horror, romance, thriller	Viva Films
Kiss Mo 'Ko	Jay Altarejos		Antoinette Taus, Dingdong Dantes, Sunshine Dizon, Polo Ravales	Romance	Viva Films
Laging Sariwa ang Sugat	Portiah Alviz		Aila Marie, Via Veloso, Sabrina M., Tonton Gutierrez, John Apacible, Dick Israel	Erotic drama	BSU Films
Lalaban Ako Hanggang sa Huling Hininga	Teddy Gomez, Jimmy Ko		Monsour del Rosario, Carmina Villarroel, Mat Ranillo III, Mike Gayoso	Action	Good Harvest
Largado, Ibabalik Kita sa Pinanggalingan Mo!	Lito Lapid, Rogelio Salvador		Lito Lapid, Roi Vinzon, Mikey Arroyo, Mark Lapid, Charlie Davao	Action	Classic Films
Linlang	Maryo J. delos Reyes		Richard Gomez, Joyce Jimenez, Pops Fernandez	Romance	Viva Films
Luksong Tinik	Jose Javier Reyes		Lorna Tolentino, Monsour del Rosario, Giselle Toengi, John Apacible	Drama	Regal Films
Maldita			Ara Mina, Tonton Gutierrez, Shintaro Valdez, Gloria Romero, Luis Gonzales, Melissa Mendez, Katrina Paula	Erotic drama	Jowell Films
Malikot na Mundo	Mel Chionglo		Jessa Zaragoza, Lara Morena, Raymond Bagatsing, Patrick Guzman, Roy Rodrigo, Lovely Rivero	Drama	OctoArts Films
Markado	Efren C. Piñon		Zoren Legaspi, Edu Manzano, Ina Raymundo	Action	Regal Films
Mga Batang .45	Deo Fajardo Jr.		Michael Rivero, Isabel Granada, Ricardo Cepeda	Action	Crystal Films
Mister Mo, Lover Ko	Joel Lamangan		Glydel Mercado, Gary Estrada, Eddie Gutierrez, Elizabeth Oropesa, Samantha Lopez, Danny Ramos	Comedy, romance	Crown Seven Ventures
Misteryosa	Neal "Buboy" Tan		Glydel Mercado, Criselda Volks, Isko Moreno, Julio Diaz, Pen Medina, Maria Isabel Lopez	Erotic drama	Kenn Films
Molata	Francis Posadas		Aya Medel, Maria Isabel Lopez, Rey 'PJ' Abellana, Allen Dizon, Jessie Delgado, Tony Bernal, Johnny Vicar	Drama	ATB-4 Films
Ms. Kristina Moran, Ang Babaeng Palaban	Eric Quizon		Rosanna Roces, Eric Quizon, Raymond Bagatsing	Romance, comedy	Viva Films
Mula sa Puso: The Movie	Wenn Deramas		Claudine Barretto, Rico Yan, Diether Ocampo	Drama	Star Cinema
Muro-Ami	Marilou Diaz-Abaya		Cesar Montano, Amy Austria, Pen Medina, Jhong Hilario, Rebecca Lusterio	Adventure, drama	GMA Films
My Pledge of Love Cannot Be Broken	Boots Plata		Judy Ann Santos, Wowie de Guzman, Bobby Andrews, Onemig Bondoc	Romance	Viva Films
Negligee	Jett C. Espiritu		Amalia Jones, Jeffery Santos, Philip Henson, Von Serna, Pia Paula, Nick Alladin, Erwin Montes, Ariel Reyes, Lyra Lorena	Erotic drama	Taurus Films
Oo Na, Mahal Na Kung Mahal	Johnny Manahan		John Lloyd Cruz, Kaye Abad, Marc Solis, Nikki Valdez, Baron Geisler, Kristine Hermosa	Drama, romance	Star Cinema
Paligayahin Mo Ako	Rolly Bernardo		Hazel Espinosa, Toffee Calma, Venus Varga, Nicko Montes, Lyra Lorena, Nick Alladin, Ariel Reyes, Miguel Ramirez	Erotic drama, romance	Taurus Films
Pepeng Agimat	Felix E. Dalay		Ramon Revilla, Bong Revilla, Princess Punzalan, Dennis Padilla, Jess Lapid Jr., King Gutierrez, Vanessa del Bianco, Gladys Reyes and LJ Moreno	Action, fantasy, adventure	Millennium Cinema
Phone Sex	Jose Javier Reyes		Ara Mina, Lee Robin Salazar, Samantha Lopez, Mike Magat, John Apacible, Marita Zobel	Erotic drama, thriller	Available Light Productions, Regal Films
Pila-Balde	Jeffrey Jeturian		Ana Capri, Allen Dizon, Marcus Madrigal, Harold Pineda	Drama	Good Harvest Unlimited
Pintado	Baldo Marro		Roi Vinzon, Monsour del Rosario, Joanne Quintas, Levi Ignacio	Action, horror, thriller	Regal Films
Resbak, Babalikan Kita	Augusto Salvador		Phillip Salvador, Jestoni Alarcon, Charlene Gonzales	Action	Seiko Films
Ratratan	Dante Varona		Dante Varona, Daniel Fernando	Action	Silver Line Films
Sa Paraiso ni Efren	Maryo J. de los Reyes		Anton Bernardo, Ana Capri, Allan Paule, Ynez Veneracion, Marinella Moran, Simon Ibarra, Harlene Bautista	Erotic drama	Good Harvest
Saka Natin Itanong Kung... Kasalanan	Rolly Bernardo		Natasha Ledesma, Mahalla Mendez, Pia Paula, Carlos Morales, Rey 'PJ' Abellana	Erotic drama, romance	Arlyn Films
Saranggola	Gil Portes		Ricky Davao, Lester Liangang	Drama	GMA Films
Scorpio Nights 2	Erik Matti		Albert Martinez, Joyce Jimenez, Daisy Reyes	Erotic drama	Viva Films
Sidhi	Joel Lamangan		Nora Aunor, Albert Martinez, Glydel Mercado, Samantha Lopez, Richard Quan, Ray Ventura	Drama, romance	Crown Seven Ventures, Solar Films
Sisa	Mario O'Hara		Gardo Versoza, Patrick Guzman, Marcus Madrigal, Aya Medel	Drama, romance	Good Harvest Productions
Sumigaw Ka Hanggang Gusto Mo!	Eric Quizon		Carmina Villarroel, Bobby Andrews, Onemig Bondoc, Gladys Reyes, Red Sternberg, Rufa Mae Quinto, Ciara Sotto, Ryan Eigenmann, Bernadette Allyson, Assunta de Rossi, Eric Quizon	Drama, Horror	Viva Films, Kaizz Ventures Productions
Suspek	Toto Natividad		Victor Neri, Sharmaine Arnaiz, Emilio Garcia	Action	Star Cinema
Sutla	Romy Suzara		Gary Estrada, Priscilla Almeda, Samantha Lopez, Ray Ventura, Jethro Ramirez	Erotic drama, romance	Solar Films
Talong	Mauro Gia Samonte		Nini Jacinto, Leonardo Litton, JC Castro, Sofia Valdez, Anita Linda, Beverly Salviejo, Dang Cruz	Erotic drama, romance	Seiko Films
Tatapatan Ko ang Lakas Mo	Jose N. Carreon		Lito Lapid, Ara Mina, Efren Reyes Jr., Mat Ranillo III, Roy Alvarez	Action	Regal Films
Tigasin	Ike Jarlego Jr.		Eddie Garcia, Victor Neri, Alma Concepcion	Action	Star Cinema
Type Kita... Walang Kokontra	Toto Natividad		Cesar Montano, Dayanara Torres, Bayani Agbayani	Action	Star Cinema
Unfaithful Wife 2: Sana'y Huwag Akong Maligaw	Peque Gallaga, Lorenzo "Lore" Reyes		Ian Veneracion, Ryan Eigenmann, Patricia Javier	Action	Viva Films
Wala Ka Nang Lupang Tatapakan	Jose Balagtas		Roi Vinzon, John Regala, Teresa Loyzaga, Paquito Diaz, Aya Medel, Ida Reyes, Jess Lapid Jr., Roberto Gonzales, Berting Labra	Action	Arthur Films International
Wansapanataym The Movie	Johnny Manahan	Charo Santos-Concio & Malou Santos (Producer)	Christopher de Leon, Shaina Magdayao, Angel Aquino, Serena Dalrymple	Fantasy	Star Cinema
Wanted: G.R.O.	Rolly Bernardo, Roberto delos Reyes		Rita Magdalena, Amalia Jones, Katrina Paula	Erotic drama	Taurus Films
Warat	Joel Lamangan		Jomari Yllana, Joyce Jimenez, Joko Diaz, Richard Quan, Alicia Alonzo, Gigette Reyes, Archie Adamos	Action, erotic drama	Viva Films
Weder-Weder Lang 'Yan	Boots Plata		Leo Martinez, Eric Quizon, John Estrada	Comedy	Star Cinema
