= Alabang Girls =

1992-1994 Philippine TV sitcom

- Genre: Sitcom
- Created by: Associated Broadcasting Company and Viva Television
- Based on: Alabang Girls (1992) by Ben Feleo
- Developed by: Associated Broadcasting Company
- Written by: Ariel Ureta
- Directed by: Ariel Ureta
- Starring: Andrew E.; Herbert Bautista; Anjo Yllana; Janno Gibbs
- Opening theme: Alabang Girls by Andrew E.
- Country of origin: Philippines
- Original language: Filipino
- No. of episodes: n/a

Production
- Running time: 1 hour and 30 minutes

Original release
- Network: ABC
- Release: 1992 – 1994

Alabang Girls is a Philippine television sitcom series broadcast by ABC. Directed by Ariel Ureta, it stars Andrew E., Herbert Bautista, Dennis Padilla, Anjo Yllana and Janno Gibbs. It aired from 1992 to 1994 and was based on a 1992 film of the same title that was directed by Ben Feleo.

== Cast ==
- Andrew E.
- Herbert Bautista
- Dennis Padilla
- Anjo Yllana
- Janno Gibbs
- Donita Rose
- Ruby Rodriguez
- Donna Cruz
- Lea Orosa
- Joy Ortega
- Jessa Zaragoza
- Ana Roces (in movie)
- Pinky Amador (in movie)
- Maybelyn dela Cruz (in movie)
- Rosanna Roces (in movie)
- Joji Isla
- Jet Alcantara
