= Patrick Guzman =

Canadian-Filipino actor (1967–2023)

- Born: Patrick Henson Guzman; October 5, 1967; Canada
- Died: June 15, 2023 (aged 55); Toronto, Canada
- Occupation: Actor
- Years active: 1991–2019
- Spouse: Liezle Guzman
- Children: 3

Patrick Henson Guzman (October 5, 1967 – June 15, 2023) was a Canadian-Filipino actor who was prominent during the 1990s.

== Career ==
Guzman's acting career began when he was noticed for featuring in a Swatch television commercial aired in the Philippines. From hereon, he made several appearances in television and film in the 1990s until the early 2000s.

Guzman signed up with Viva Films and was introduced in the film Andrew Ford Medina (1991). From then on, he was often part of films starring Andrew E., such as Mahirap Maging Pogi (1992) and Pretty Boy (1993). He was also part of films starring Sharon Cuneta such as Una Kang Naging Akin (1991) and Ikaw (1993). In 1994, he moved to OctoArts Films as a non-exclusive artist and starred in films such as O-Ha! Ako Pa? (1994), Koronang Itim (1994), Ben Balasador (1996), Halik ng Vampira (1997) and Malikot na Mondo (1999). Other films he appeared in include Sa Piling ng Iba (1998) and Sisa (1999) and Kung Ako Na Lang Sana (2003)

Guzman would become host of late night variety show Penthouse Party, as well as the game show Ready, Get Set, Go!. Guzman was co-host in the musical variety show VIP, with Vilma Santos.

In 2004, Guzman retired from the Philippine entertainment industry and returned to Canada where he would start his own family.

His last film appearance would be in the Canadian Filipino-language 2019 film BROmance The Movie by Beverly Vergel.

== Personal life and death ==
Guzman was born and raised in Canada and had Canadian citizenship.

During his heyday in showbiz, Guzman was formerly linked to Gelli de Belen and Bb. Pilipinas International 1991 Patty Betita.

Guzman was married to Liezle and had three children.

Guzman died from a heart attack in Toronto, on June 15, 2023, at the age of 55.
