= Ikaw Lang =

Philippine action drama film

- Directed by: Chito S. Roño
- Screenplay by: Gina Marissa Tagasa; Humilde "Meek" Roxas; Tom Adrales; Chito S. Roño
- Story by: Gina Marissa Tagasa; Humilde "Meek" Roxas
- Produced by: Wally Chua; Victor Villegas; Fely Ong; Tony Ong
- Starring: Vilma Santos; Ronnie Ricketts; Cesar Montano
- Cinematography: Jun Dalawis
- Edited by: Renato de Leon
- Music by: Mon del Rosario
- Production companies: Silver Screen; Cinestars
- Distributed by: Moviestars Production
- Release date: January 12, 1993
- Running time: 115 minutes
- Country: Philippines
- Language: Filipino

Ikaw Lang is a 1993 Philippine action drama film directed by Chito S. Roño from a screenplay he co-wrote with Gina Marissa Tagasa, Humilde "Meek" Roxas, and Tom Adrales, with Tagasa and Roxas co-creating the story concept. The film stars Vilma Santos, Ronnie Ricketts and Cesar Montano.

== Plot ==
A librarian's husband and mother-in-law turn out to be psychotically abusive. When the husband mistakenly thinks he has killed her, he dumps her in a river, where she is saved by a fisherman. Desperate for money and in need of help to take revenge on her husband, she hooks up with a bank robber whom she falls in love with. Together, they return to her husband's home in an attempt to kill him and save her baby.

== Cast ==
- Vilma Santos as Celina
- Ronnie Ricketts as Dalton
- Cesar Montano as Alfred
- Zeny Zabala as Martha
- Dencio Padilla as Erning
- Janine Barredo as Tess
- Feling Cudia as Trining
- Aurora Yumul as Yaya
- Vangie Labalan as Senyang
- Cris Daluz as Andres
- Roldan Aquino as Sarge

== Production ==
Scenes from the film were shot in Pagsanjan, Laguna.

== Awards ==
Year	Awards	Category	Recipient	Result	Ref.
1994	5th YCC Awards	Best Achievement in Cinematography and Visual Design	Jun Dalawis; Charlie Arceo	Won	
1994	5th YCC Awards	Best Achievement in Film Editing	Renato de Leon	Nominated	
1994	5th YCC Awards	Best Achievement in Sound and Aural Orchestration	Mon del Rosario; Vic Macamay	Nominated	
