= D'Uragons =

Philippine comedy film

- Official movie poster
- Directed by: Ben Feleo
- Written by: Ben Feleo
- Produced by: Vincent del Rosario III
- Starring: Eddie Garcia; Andrew E.
- Cinematography: Ramon Marcelino
- Edited by: Rene Tala
- Music by: Edwin "Kiko" Ortega
- Production company: Viva Films
- Distributed by: Viva Films
- Release date: August 7, 2002
- Running time: 115 minutes
- Country: Philippines
- Language: Filipino

D'Uragons is a 2002 Philippine action comedy film written and directed by Ben Feleo. The film stars Eddie Garcia and Andrew E.

The film is streaming online on YouTube.

It was the last film directed by Feleo before his retirement and death in 2011.

== Cast ==
- Eddie Garcia as Sherlock
- Andrew E. as Orot
- Angelu de Leon as Claudia
- Patricia Javier as Maritess
- Joko Diaz as Grego
- Mystica as Donya Vda. de Ful
- Eddie Arenas as Don Serafin
- Shannah Quiritiquit as Shirley
- Whitney Tyson as Condo Security Guard
- Joji dela Paz as Jail Warden
- Dagul as Shakil
- Diwata as Poster Model
