= Zeny Zabala =

Filipino actress

- Born: Emerenciana Ortiz Santos; July 21, 1937; Philippines
- Died: August 8, 2017 (aged 80); Quezon City, Philippines
- Resting place: Loyola Memorial Park, Marikina
- Occupation: Actress
- Years active: 1954–2013
- Spouse: Rodolfo "Boy" Garcia (m. 1958; sep. 1964) Ben Feleo (m. 1964; died 2011)
- Relatives: Johnny Delgado (stepson)

Emerenciana Ortiz Santos (July 21, 1937 – August 8, 2017), professionally known as Zeny Zabala, was a Filipina actress. Born and raised in Marikina, she was famously known as the "villain of Sampaguita Pictures" for her frequent portrayals of antagonist roles in her films.

== Early life ==
Zabala was the fourth of nine siblings and was born in Marikina to shoemaker Enrique Santos and Ursula Ortiz.

== Career ==
She was discovered in 1953 while accompanying her sister, Caridad, who was already working in the film industry. Her first role was as a mother in the 1953 film Siga-Siga, where her character dies giving birth to Anita Linda's character. Due to her film career, she was forced to drop out of high school in her second year. Her first movie with Sampaguita Pictures was Binibining Kalog, opposite Lolita Rodriguez and Ramon Revilla. She later married actor Rodolfo "Boy" Garcia on June 30, 1958.

In 1963, Zabala became a freelance actress. In 1964, she received her first FAMAS nomination for Best Supporting Actress for Ang Bukas Ay Akin!, starring Charito Solis and Nestor de Villa. That same year, she remarried, this time to director Ben Feleo.

In the mid-1960s, alongside her film career, Zabala began establishing businesses in Marikina, including a restaurant called Zeny Zabala's Canteen near the town's Shoe Trade Fair, a shoe-making shop called LeConstant Shoe Shop, and a furniture store. She was soon offered a lead role in the film Ruby by businessman Narciso G. Isidro, Zabala's relative and the grandfather of singer Agot Isidro. The film was to be produced by NGI Productions, a newly established studio in Marikina.

In the 1980s, she continued to appear in more films with Dolphy, including Kalabog en Bosyo Strike Again (1985) and her final known big-screen appearance, Tataynic (1998), both directed by her husband, Ben Feleo, who died in 2011. She co-starred with Vilma Santos in Marilou Diaz-Abaya's Baby Tsina (1984) and played Santos' cruel mother-in-law in Chito Roño's Ikaw Lang (1991).

In 1982, she joined the cast of John en Marsha as the mother of Madel, Rolly Puruntong's wife.

== Personal life ==
At one point, she was married to Rodolfo "Boy" Garcia, another fellow actor from Sampaguita Pictures, in 1958. The couple would be eventually separated in 1964 and Garcia would later marry actress Lucita Soriano in 1968.

In the same year, she married director Ben Feleo, whom she had met in 1962. She became the stepmother of Feleo's son, Johnny Delgado, from his previous marriage. Feleo died of a stroke in September 2011.

== Death ==
Zabala died at the National Kidney and Transplant Institute in Quezon City on August 8, 2017, due to kidney failure. She was 80 years old.

== Filmography ==
=== Film ===
Year	Title	Role	Note(s)	Ref(s).
1954	Siga-Siga			
1954	Lourdes			
1954	Milyonarya at Hampaslupa			
1954	Tin-Edyer			
1955	Pandora			
1955	Binibining Kalog			
1956	Prince Charming			
1956	Teresa			
1956	Gilda			
1956	Gigolo			
1957	Sino ang Maysala?			
1957	Pasang Krus			
1957	Pretty Boy			
1957	Prinsesang Gusgusin			
1958	Mga Reyna ng Vicks			
1958	Palaboy			
1958	Berdaderong Ginto			
1958	Talipandas			
1963	Dance-O-Rama			
1963	Ang Bukas Ay Akin			
1964	Ang Mahiwagang Pag-ibig ni Lola Cinderella			
1965	Ana-Roberta			
1966	Viva Ranchera	Esmeralda		
1967	The Sunjuka Master			
1967	Ruby	Ruby		
1968	Mindanao			
1968	Room for Rent			
1969	Kalinga			
1969	Luzviminda: Inang Pilipinas	Luzviminda		
1970	Our Lady of Peñafrancia (Patroness of Bicolandia)			
1984	Baby Tsina			
1985	John en Marsha '85			
1987	My Bugoy Goes to Congress			
1991	Ikaw Lang	Martha		
1991	Contreras Gang	Chinese wife		
1993	Gagay: Prinsesa ng Brownout	Aling Huling		
1995	Okey si Mam			
1996	Neber2Geder			
1997	Extranghero	Doña Isabel		
1997	Strict ang Parents Ko!	Doña Felicidad Zaragoza		
1998	Tataynic	Doña Isabel		
