= Bangers (1995 film) =

Philippine comedy film

- Directed by: Ben Feleo
- Written by: Ben Feleo; Dan Salamante; Reynaldo Castro
- Produced by: William Leary
- Starring: Andrew E.; Joey de Leon; Chiquito
- Cinematography: Ernie dela Paz
- Edited by: Renato de Leon
- Music by: Ricky del Rosario
- Production company: Viva Films
- Distributed by: Viva Films
- Release date: May 25, 1995
- Running time: 110 minutes
- Country: Philippines
- Language: Filipino

Bangers is a 1995 Philippine comedy film co-written and directed by Ben Feleo. The film stars Andrew E., Joey de Leon and Chiquito.

== Plot ==
Brothers Hap and Hep, and grandfather Hop all live in the countryside. They are relatives of the popular rock singer Hip who works for a seedy club owner in Manila named Richard. Unknown to them, Hip suffers from mental and emotional torture caused by Richard who uses his concerts and gigs to distribute drugs among his audience. Not wanting to expose his illegal activities after their spat, Richard has Hip killed in a car bombing.

Hap, Hep and Hop receive a letter from Hip on the same day of the bombing. Believing Hip will provide for their needs, the three decide to go to Manila. However learning of Hip's death in the newspapers, they locate his comically cremated remains at the funeral parlor, where his landlady offers her condolences and decides to let the three stay at Hip's place.

Hap and Hep find a job as waiters at the club where Hip previously worked. They also encounter two women connected to Richard: his girlfriend Sharon who initially dislikes Hep due to his naughty pranks on her when she was living in the same house with them; and Dorie, Richard's sister who gets mistaken by Hap for another woman he had a crush on. Both girls have issues with Richard as he gets busier with his business partners and their illegal activities and eventually fall for Hip's brothers. Richard discovers the potential of Hap and Hep as rock stars after seeing them singing while cleaning up the place and promotes the two as resident rock singers in his club.

During one of Richard's business meetings, Dorie discovers that two of her brother's bodyguards are plotting to kill Richard and his associates at the concert so that they could take over the business. Before she could report it, she is caught and held hostage in the mansion but is rescued by her friends. At an open-air concert produced by Richard, Hap and Hep are joined by Hop, forming the group "Hibangers". During the concert, transactions are smoothly done while the audience were singing along with the group. But during the last act, Dorie shows up and accidentally causes a stampede, resulting in money scattering all over the place. Richard's bodyguards try to chase Dorie but Sharon, Hap and Hep come to her rescue. Seeing his drug deals go awry Richard and his remaining henchmen go after the four of them but are killed in a road accident, including the bodyguards who plot against him. Hop, Hap, Hep, Dorie, Sharon and their friends gather to celebrate their survival.

== Cast ==
- Andrew E. as Hap Hibang
- Joey de Leon as Hep Hibang
- Arnel Ignacio as Hip Hibang
- Chiquito as Hop Hibang
- Ana Roces as Dorie
- Michael de Mesa as Richard
- Dindi Gallardo as Sharon
- Joji dela Paz as Mr. Lee

== Production ==
The film had the working title Hibangers. When the writers found out that 'Sang Linggo nAPO Sila had a segment of the same title, it was shortened to Bangers to avoid confusion. This is the last film Andrew E. and Ana Roces paired up in until the 2020 film Pakboys Takusa and Roces' last film with Viva Films before her brief return to her home studio Regal Films.
