= Pakboys Takusa =

Philippine comedy film

- Film poster, released for streaming
- Directed by: Al Tantay
- Written by: Rolf Mahilum; Dan Salamante; Al Tantay
- Produced by: Vincent del Rosario III; Vic del Rosario Jr.; Veronique del Rosario-Corpus
- Starring: Janno Gibbs; Dennis Padilla; Andrew E.; Jerald Napoles
- Cinematography: Carlos S. Montaño Jr.
- Edited by: Danny Gloria; J.J. Gloria
- Music by: Isagani Palabyab; Franco Tantay
- Production company: Viva Films
- Distributed by: Viva Films
- Release date: December 25, 2020
- Running time: 122 minutes
- Country: Philippines
- Language: Filipino

Pakboys Takusa is a 2020 Philippine comedy film produced by Viva Films starring Janno Gibbs, Dennis Padilla, Andrew E., and Jerald Napoles. Directed by Al Tantay. It is one of the official entries of the 2020 Metro Manila Film Festival. The film was premiered on December 25, 2020.

The term "Takusa" is a contraction of the Filipino phrase takot sa asawa or "fear of one's spouse".

== Plot ==
A group of middle-aged men with their acts of unfaithfulness, shows how they attempt to acquire back their wives' trust.

== Cast ==
- Janno Gibbs as Justine
- Dennis Padilla as Bruno
- Jerald Napoles as Drake
- Andrew E. as Dr. John Bartolome
- Ana Roces as Arianna "Tart" Bartolome
- Angelu de Leon as Selina
- Maui Taylor as Miley
- Nathalie Hart as Natasha
- Leo Martinez as Bernardo
- Marissa Sanchez as Kate
- Sheree
- Gary Lim as Joko
- Gene Padilla as Congressman
- Francine Garcia
- Ogie Alcasid (cameo role)

== Marketing ==
Pakboys Takusa was reportedly under production as early as January 2020 under the working title VIVA HQ for the look test & storycon of CONDO/PAKBOYS The Movie.

The trailer for Pakboys Takusa was released on November 26, 2020, which had at least 23.7 million accumulated views as of December 2, 2020.

Pakboys Takusa received negative reception online for its trailer. Miss Trans Global 2020 pageant winner, actress and transgender rights activist Mela Franco Habijan on her part was critical of the film's "slapstick, LGBTQIA-phobic comedy". Habijan cited certain scenes which portrayed a transgender woman peeing while standing and how Padilla's character was bothered sleeping with the same woman as comedic at the expense of the transgender community. She called for the film's disqualification from the 2020 Metro Manila Film Festival.

The starring actors of the film responded to the controversy arising from the trailer. Napoles on his part pointed out the whole film did not release yet and asked potential audience and critics to watch the whole scene for its context. Andrew E. said that the actress who played transgender, Francine Garcia a transgender herself and the winner of Eat Bulaga!'s LGBT pageant segment Super Sireyna 2013, enjoyed her role in Pakboys and did not have any complaints regarding the film. Gibbs apologized for the backlash, but added that the film is not a film with "political correctness" or "life lessons but a straight-out comedy.

== Release ==
This will serve for Dennis Padilla, Andrew E, Janno Gibbs, and Al Tantay as their second collaboration in a film after Sanggano, Sanggago't Sanggwapo which was released in 2019. The film was premiered on December 25, 2020, via online platform UpStream, as one of the official ten entries of the 2020 Metro Manila Film Festival.
