= Hinukay Ko Na ang Libingan Mo =

- Theatrical poster
- Directed by: Manuel "Fyke" Cinco
- Screenplay by: Ricky Lee
- Story by: D.G. Salonga
- Produced by: William C. Leary
- Starring: Robin Padilla
- Cinematography: Joe Batac Jr.
- Edited by: Ruben "Tikboy" Natividad
- Music by: Jimmy Fabregas
- Production company: Viva Films
- Distributed by: Viva Films
- Release date: June 5, 1991
- Country: Philippines
- Language: Filipino

Hinukay Ko Na ang Libingan Mo! (English: I Dug Out Your Grave!) is a 1991 Philippine action film directed by Manuel "Fyke" Cinco from a screenplay by Ricky Lee, based on the comics of the same name by D.G. Salonga and serialized in Happy Komiks. The film stars Robin Padilla on dual roles.

== Plot ==
Anton has just married his fiancée, Vera, when an old man, Laroza, rapes his wife, mauls him, and leaves him for dead. Elmo is an ex-convict who initially tries to take his share of the inheritance, but inherits Anton's problems instead. He accepts this to repent for his sin, having accidentally committed patricide, which left him and his twin to fend for themselves. While Elmo takes his time, Anton takes his vengeance to fruition.

Elmo tries to reconnect with his former life as a part of his vengeance for his twin, and along the way, meets Vera, now going undercover by the name of Mariposa. Elmo would soon be reunited with Anton, long presumed dead, who is enraged at his sight and decides to take the revenge into his own hands. Elmo's pregnant live-in partner, Janet, dies in an encounter with one of Laroza's thugs.

Anton and Vera abduct Laroza and his family. Anton orders Laroza's son to bury the old man alive. However, before Anton's revenge is fully exacted, a firefight ensues, and Elmo comes to the aid of Anton and Vera. After the dust settles, Anton, Elmo, and Vera emerge as the survivors, having killed Laroza and finally serving justice to all the wrongs committed by him.

== Cast ==
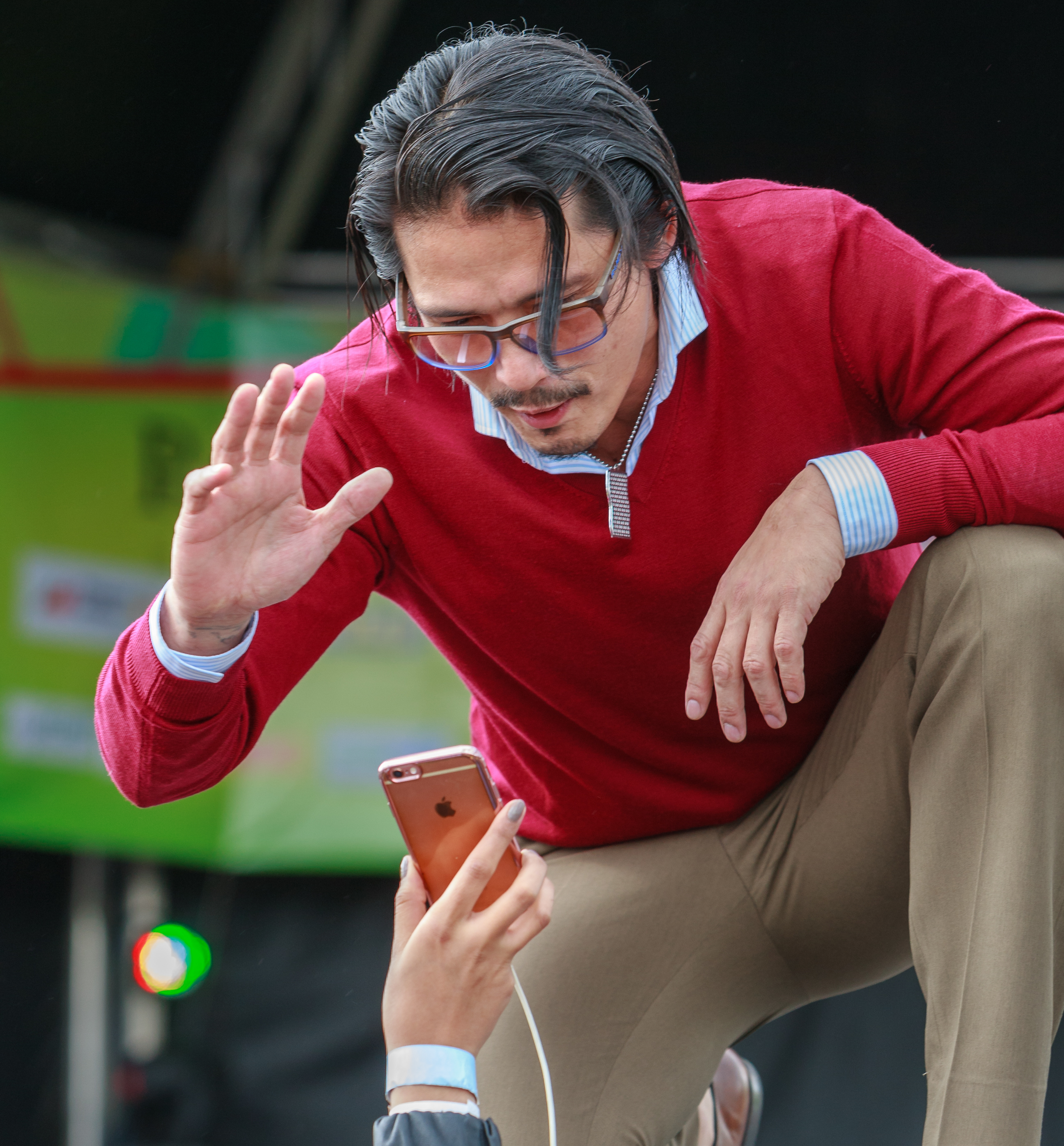
Robin Padilla portrays Dual Role Elmo and Anton

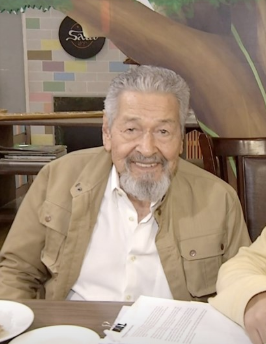
Eddie Garcia portrays Laroza San Vicente

- Robin Padilla as Elmo and Anton
- Nanette Medved as Vera/Mariposa
- Cherry Pie Picache as Janet
- Eddie Garcia as Laroza San Vicente
- Dencio Padilla as Berting
- Dindo Arroyo as Turko
- Lucita Soriano as Laroza's Wife
- Marco Polo Garcia as Ricky
- Mayleen Zapanta as Yvette
- Daryl Lance as Opet
- Naty Santiago as Vera's Mother
- Eva Ramos as Anton's Mayordoma
- Odette Khan as Club Manager
- Beverly Uy as Child Musician at Wedding
- Jess Ramos as Old man at Forest
- Val Iglesias as Prisoner with fight
- Cesar Iglesias as Jail Guard
- Jun Hidalgo as Laroza's henchman
- July Hidalgo as Laroza's henchman
- Romy Romulo as Laroza's henchman
- Nonoy de Guzman as Laroza's henchman
- Polly Cadsawan as Laroza's henchman
- Vic Belaro as Laroza's henchman
- Eddie Tuazon as Laroza's henchman
- Leo Padilla as Laroza's henchman
- Joey Padilla as Laroza's henchman
- Alex Cunanan as Laroza's henchman
- Nash Espinosa as Laroza's henchman
- Rey Lapid as Laroza's henchman
- Efren Lapid as Laroza's henchman
