= O-Ha! Ako Pa? =

- Directed by: Mike Relon Makiling
- Written by: Mike Relon Makiling
- Story by: Chinkee Tan
- Produced by: Orly Ilacad
- Starring: Jimmy Santos; Sunshine Cruz
- Cinematography: Sergio Lobo
- Edited by: Rudy Tabotabo
- Music by: Sunny Ilacad
- Production company: OctoArts Films
- Distributed by: Regal Home Video
- Release date: June 2, 1994
- Country: Philippines
- Language: Filipino

O-Ha! Ako Pa? is a 1994 Filipino comedy film directed by Mike Relon Makiling and starring Jimmy Santos.

== Plot ==
The film's story is about the tenants of an exclusive village and the security guard hired to protect them. Ryan (Jimmy Santos) is a stupid but honest security guard while Nonong (Ogie Alcasid) is a clever country boy who comes to the big city to live with his cousin Steven (Patrick Guzman). When a problem led by a con artist named General Motorola (Paquito Diaz) arose, things will never be the same again for Ryan and the community but romance fills the air and love conquers all.

== Cast ==
- Jimmy Santos as Ryan
- Ogie Alcasid as Nonong
- Sunshine Cruz as Yvette
- Patrick Guzman as Steven
- Babalu as Raul Malino/Chief Babalu
- Michael V. as Jack
- Jenette Fernando as Ligaya
- Ruby Rodriguez as Elsa
- Lailani Navarro as Gigi
- Paolo Contis as Bad Teddy
- Paquito Diaz as General Motorola/ head of Akyat Bahay
- Jaime Fabregas as Yvette's father
- Danny Labra as Typhoon Emong/ Akyat Bahay accomplice
- Chinkee Tan as General Motorola's driver/ Akyat Bahay accomplice
- Cita Astals as Principal
- Nanding Fernandez as Bad Teddy's father
- Ernie Zarate as Dracula/ first Akyat Bahay victim
- Archie Adamos as Lucas
- Dang Cruz as Brooks

== Reception ==
The film was shown on GMA on April 12, 2012, scoring a 6.6% rating based on people ratings, and a 15.5% rating based on household ratings, ranking it among the top 10 daytime programs for that day.

== Release ==
=== Home media ===
The entire film was made available on YouTube for streaming without charge by OctoArts Films on February 28, 2024.
