= Sanggano, Sanggago't Sanggwapo =

2019 Philippine comedy film

Sanggano, Sanggago’t Sanggwapo
- Theatrical release poster
- Directed by: Al Tantay
- Written by: Dan Salamante; Al Tantay
- Produced by: Vic del Rosario Jr.
- Starring: Andrew E.; Dennis Padilla; Janno Gibbs; Eddie Garcia; Froiland Salazar; Louise delos Reyes
- Cinematography: Carlos S. Montaño Jr.
- Edited by: Danny Gloria
- Music by: Ronald "Bond" Singson; Franco Tantay
- Production company: Viva Films
- Distributed by: Viva Films
- Release date: September 4, 2019
- Running time: 121 minutes
- Country: Philippines
- Language: Filipino

Sanggano, Sanggago’t Sanggwapo (transl. The Thug, the Bonehead 'n' the Good-Looking) is a 2019 Philippine comedy film directed by Al Tantay, and starring Andrew E., Dennis Padilla, Janno Gibbs, Eddie Garcia (in his final appearance), and Louise delos Reyes. It is about three troublesome friends who learn that one of them has inherited a hacienda from a deceased, rich man alleged to be his father. The film was released in the Philippines on September 4, 2019. It is also a sequel of Sanggano't Sanggago way back in 2001 starring Bayani Agbayani and Eddie Garcia.

== Plot ==
Andy (Andrew E.), Johnny (Janno Gibbs) and Dondon (Dennis Padilla) are working as promodisers in a local mall. After fighting with robbers in a mall, Atty. Jose Agcaoili (Christopher Roxas) broke the news that Johnny's father, Don Roberto Endrinal had died. In his last will and testament, Don Roberto inherited his hacienda to Johnny. Johnny, Dondon and Andy went home to the Hacienda and found out that there was a big problem with the hacienda according to Enrico. But, Johnny denied about his identity and he and Andy switched places. There Andy who poses himself as Johnny met Sam (Louise Delos Reyes), who is the daughter of Don Roberto's best friend. Don Roberto arranged Johnny and Sam for marriage. But Johnny refused and ran away. In the hacienda, Dondon met Isabel (Zarah Tolentino) who is the caretaker of the animals in the farm.

Johnny who poses as Andy met June (Cindy Miranda), an engineer who is pissed off at Johnny after he took her luggage away at the airport. The news of Johnny's return reach Russel Flores (Eddie Garcia) who is planning to build a hotel and casino at the hacienda. Russel is planning to poison the lake so that it may cause sickness and death to plants and animals. With the help of his lawyer Atty. Saguit and Russell's personal secretary Selina, they offered Johnny 100 million pesos to sell the hacienda which Andy who poses as Johnny agreed. As time goes by, Andy who poses as Johnny is getting closer with Sam, while Dondon is also getting closer with Isabel. While the real Johnny would talk to the veterinarian and plant pathologist. After which, he would have sex with them. When Andy, who poses as Johnny met with Chairman Flores for him to sign the papers, Johnny who poses as Andy poured coffee on purpose, in order to stop Andy to sell the hacienda. While Dondon, Isabel and June discovered that someone is pouring poison in the irrigation system. Johnny also discovered that his father didn't die in an accident. Don Roberto was ambushed and their vehicle fell on a ravine. Only Sam survived the accident, but it caused her to be blind. In another attempt, Atty. Saguit visited Andy who poses Johnny for him to sign the papers. But Johnny who poses as Andy took the deed of sale and burned it in a barbecue grill. There Russell calls for drastic measures. They use Selina to convince Johnny to sell the hacienda. Dondon and Isabel pushed through with their one night stand, Johnny celebrated his birthday with June and had a drinking spree. Selina came to Andy who poses as Johnny and ask if she would stay for a night. However, it was a plan of Atty. Saguit, there she put a lapel microphone with a recorder for her to record their conversation. Selina confessed that she likes Andy who poses as Johnny but he confessed that he loves Sam. However, Selina knew about Andy's true identity and Atty. Saguit's plan failed. Selina returned to Andy and gave to him a voice recorder, there they knew that Russell is the mastermind in the murder of Don Roberto. June and Johnny decided to talk to the mayor and tell about Russell's plans. While Andy and Dondon along with Selina sought the help of Atty. Agcaoili. Selina also revealed that after Andy signed the deed of sale, he will be gunned down by a sniper. There, Atty. Agcaoili sought the help from the governor.

In the celebration of the town fiesta, Johnny, Andy, Dondon along with June, Sam, Isabel and Enrico came. Selina also told Dondon, that the sniper is positioned at the foyer. June talked to the mayor and told about Russell being the mastermind of all the problems in the hacienda. However, the mayor didn't listen to her because he's a close friend of Russell. There Johnny revealed his true identity as the real son of Don Roberto. A furious Russell was about to shoot at Andy, but Selina shielded Andy and was shot instead. And when Russell about to shoot Johnny, Dondon used a pan to shield, but the bullet hit Andy instead. There Russell told the mayor to come with him, or he will be implicated. But the mayor shot at Russell. As they're about to rush Dondon to the hospital, mayor along with Atty. Saguit and some policemen chased them. At the hospital, several police officers are on standby along with the governor and arrested the mayor and Atty. Saguit. They also learned that Selina died from the gunshot she sustained.

Johnny decided to give the house to Enrico and his family and he and June are now on. Dondon is now also happy with Isabel. As for Andy, he knew that he will be rejected by Sam after she regained her eyesight after Selina decided to give her eyes to Sam before she died. Sam also confessed her love to Andy.

== Cast ==
- Andrew E. as Andy
- Froiland Salazar as Astig
- Dennis Padilla as Dondon
- Janno Gibbs as Johnny
- Eddie Garcia as Russel Flores
- Louise delos Reyes as Sam
- Cindy Miranda as Engineer June Olpindo
- Zarah Tolentino as Isabel
- Debbie Garcia as Selina
- Vanessa Wright as Alice
- Jourdanne Castillo as Dr. Martha Montelibano, the plant pathologist
- Samantha Page as the veterinarian
- Julian Trono as young Andy
- Vitto Marquez as young Dondon
- Andrew Muhlach as young Johnny
- Katya Santos as Venus
- Patricia Javier as Bella
- Jennifer Lee as Atty. Saguit
- Johnny Revilla as Don Roberto Endrinal
- Christopher Roxas as Atty. Jose Agcaoili
- Lander Vera-Perez as Mayor
- Gary Lim
- Kedebon Colim
- Janna Roque
- Sarah Chang

== Sequel ==
A sequel titled Sanggano, Sanggago’t Sanggwapo 2: Aussie! Aussie (O Sige) (transl. The Thug, the Bonehead 'n' the Good-Looking 2: Aussie, Aussie, Oh, Come On!) was released on December 31, 2021, on Vivamax. It features the 3 guys getting attracted to a half-Australian woman.
