= Ben Feleo =

Filipino film director and screenwriter

- Born: Benjamin Nabong Feleo; August 16, 1926; Quezon City, Philippines
- Died: September 21, 2011 (aged 85); Quezon City, Philippines
- Resting place: Loyola Memorial Park, Marikina
- Other name: Mang Ben
- Occupations: Director, writer
- Years active: 1950–2003
- Spouses: Victorina Marasigan; Zeny Zabala (m. 1964)
- Children: 2 (including Johnny)

Benjamin Nabong Feleo Sr. (January 16, 1926 – September 21, 2011) was a Filipino film director and screenwriter who directed more than forty films.

== Early life and career ==
Feleo's film career began with Dalawang Bandila in 1950. He was best known for Filipino comedic films such as Wooly Booly II and Humanap Ka ng Panget in 1990.

== Personal life ==
He was married to educator Victorina Marasigan with whom he had sons Juan Feleo a.k.a. Johnny Delgado, and Benjamin Feleo Jr. (also known as Bobby). They had two children. After his separation from Marasigan, he married actress Zeny Zabala in 1964 and was with her till he died. He is the grandfather of actress Ina Feleo.

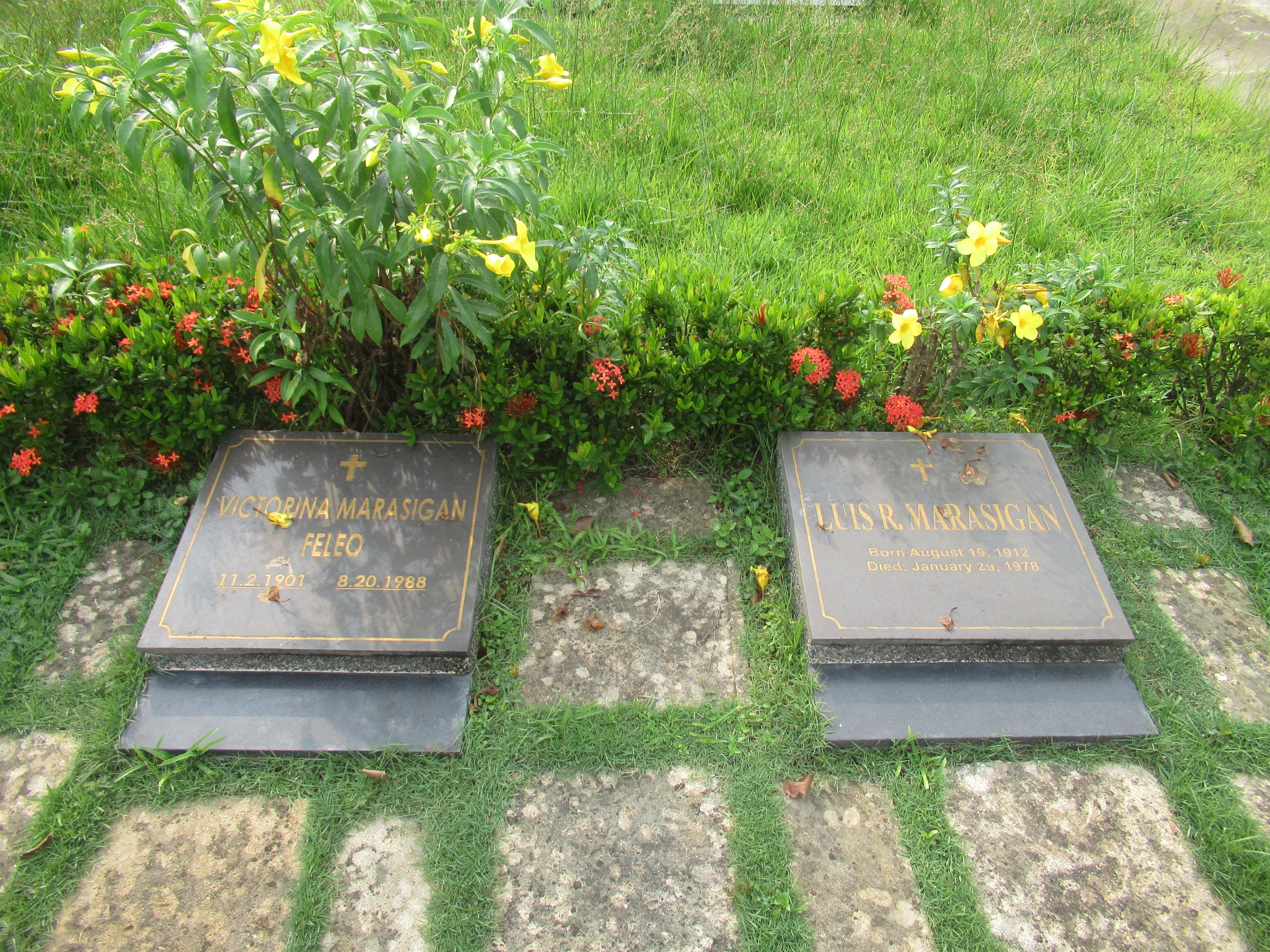
Victorina Feleo-Luis R. Marasigan

== Death ==
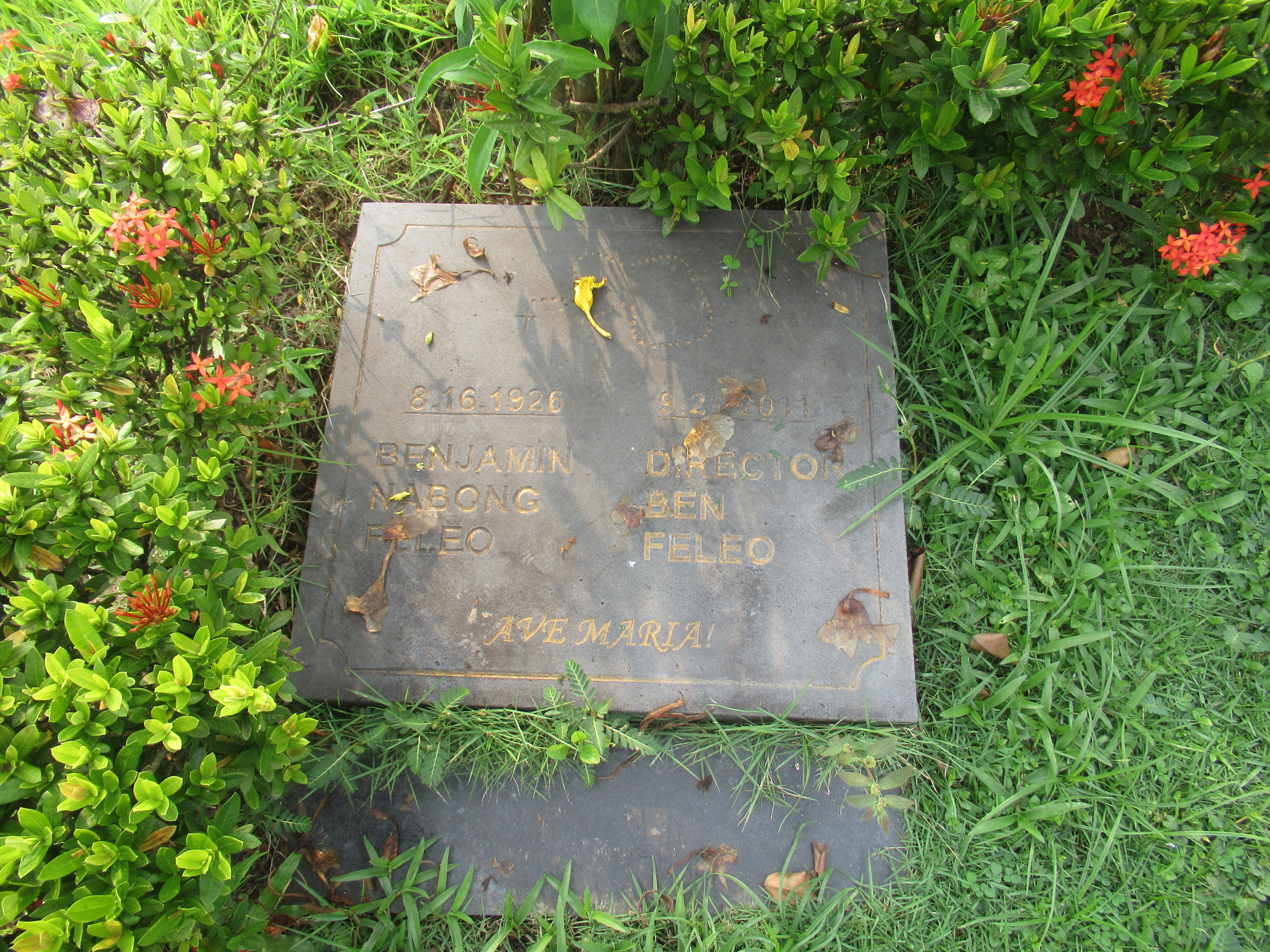
Ben Feleo grave

Feleo died on 21 September 2011, aged 85, due to stroke. He was buried at Loyola Memorial Park in Marikina. He was predeceased by his sons, actor Johnny Delgado (rested next to him) and Benjamin Feleo Jr.

== Filmography ==
=== Director ===
| Year | Title |
|---|---|
| 1966 | Target: Sexy Rose |
| 1967 | Let's Merry Go Round |
| 1967 | Alexander Bilis |
| 1967 | Alias Chain Gang |
| 1968 | Sa Manlulupig 'Di Ka Pasisiil |
| 1968 | Mali-Mali Meets Batangueno |
| 1968 | Kiko en Kikay |
| 1968 | Kidlat sa Karate |
| 1968 | Honey and West |
| 1968 | Daredevil |
| 1970 | Machine Gun Johnny and the Sexy Queen |
| 1970 | Santa Teresa Da Avila |
| 1971 | Sanga-Sangang Apoy |
| 1971 | Europe Here We Come! |
| 1971 | Banderang Kapos |
| 1972 | The Young Idols |
| 1972 | Kumander Dayang-Dayang |
| 1972 | Notorious |
| 1972 | Itik-Itik |
| 1973 | Kasing-Kasing Ko |
| 1975 | Miss Aruba Went to Town |
| 1975 | The Witch |
| 1975 | Sa Pagitan ng Dalawang Langit |
| 1975 | Jack and Jill and John |
| 1976 | Fiesta: Isang Halik! Isang Sayaw! Isang Peseta! |
| 1982 | My Heart Belongs to Daddy |
| 1982 | Mga Kanyon ni Mang Simeon |
| 1983 | Always in My Heart |
| 1984 | Nang Maghalo ang Balat sa Tinalupan |
| 1985 | Goatbuster: Sa Templo ni Dune |
| 1985 | The Crazy Professor |
| 1986 | Kalabog en Bosyo Strike Again |
| 1987 | Binibining Tsuperman |
| 1988 | Rock-a-Bye Baby: Tatlo ang Daddy |
| 1988 | One Two Bato, Three Four Bapor |
| 1989 | Everlasting Love |
| 1989 | Wooly Booly: Ang Classmate Kong Alien |
| 1990 | Tootsie Wootsie: Ang Bandang Walang Atrasan |
| 1990 | Wooly Booly 2: Ang Titser Kong Alien |
| 1990 | Humanap Ka ng Panget |
| 1991 | Pitong Gamol |
| 1991 | Andrew Ford Medina: Huwag Kang Gamol |
| 1992 | Pretty Boy |
| 1992 | Alabang Girls |
| 1992 | Mahirap Maging Pogi |
| 1993 | Ang Boyfriend Kong Gamol |
| 1994 | Pinagbiyak na Bunga |
| 1994 | Ikaw ang Miss Universe ng Buhay Ko |
| 1995 | Bikini Watch |
| 1995 | Bangers |
| 1996 | Neber 2 Geder |
| 1996 | Where D' Girls 'R |
| 1997 | Extranghero |
| 1998 | Tataynic |
| 2001 | Tusong Twosome |
| 2001 | Weyt a Minit, Kapeng Mainit |
| 2002 | D'Uragons |

=== Screenplay ===
| Year | Title |
|---|---|
| 1959 | Kahapon Lamang |
| 1959 | Isinumpa |
| 1959 | Bulilit Al Capone |
| 1962 | Tanzan The Mighty |
| 1962 | Lab na Lab Kita |
| 1962 | Siyam na Langit |
| 1963 | Tres Kantos |
| 1963 | Tansan vs. Tarsan |
| 1963 | Dance-O-Rama |
| 1963 | Ang Manananggol ni Ruben |
| 1964 | Walang Takot sa Patalim |
| 1964 | Simbangis ng Tigre |
| 1964 | Bilis at Tapang |
| 1964 | Adre, Ayos Na! Ang Buto-Buto |
| 1964 | Pitong Desperada |
| 1965 | Babaeng Kidlat |
| 1965 | 7 Mata-Hari |
| 1966 | Mula na Kita'y Ibigin |
| 1966 | Ikaw ... Ang Gabi at Ang Awit |
| 1966 | Whisper to the Wind |
| 1966 | Doble Trece |
| 1966 | Counter Spy |
| 1966 | Agent Wooly Booly at Ang 7 Bikini |
| 1967 | Pambihirang Pito |
| 1968 | Honey and West |
| 1968 | Ang Banal, Ang Ganid, At Ang Pusakal |
| 1970 | Machine Gun Johnny and the Sexy Queen |
| 1971 | Sanga-Sangang Apoy |
| 1971 | Banderang Kapos |
| 1972 | The Young Idols |
| 1972 | Kumander Dayang-Dayang |
| 1972 | Notorious |
| 1972 | Itik-Itik |
| 1973 | Kasing-Kasing Ko |
| 1975 | Jack and Jill and John |
| 1976 | Beloy and the Kid |
| 1976 | Fiesta: Isang Halik! Isang Sayaw! Isang Peseta! |
| 1981 | Teacher's Pet |
| 1981 | San Basilio |
| 1982 | Dancing Master 2: Macao Connection |
| 1983 | Always in My Heart |
| 1984 | Da Best in Da West |
| 1984 | Nang Maghalo ang Balat sa Tinalupan |
| 1985 | John & Marsha '85: Sa Probinsiya |
| 1985 | Goatbuster: Sa Templo ni Dune |
| 1985 | The Crazy Professor |
| 1986 | Balimbing: Mga Taong Hunyango |
| 1989 | Everlasting Love |
| 1989 | Wooly Booly: Ang Classmate Kong Alien |
| 1990 | Toosie Wootsie: Ang Bandang Walang Atrasan |
| 1990 | Teacher's Enemy No. 1 |
| 1990 | Wooly Booly 2: Ang Classmate Kong Alien |
| 1991 | Pitong Gamol |
| 1992 | Pretty Boy |
| 1992 | Alabang Girls |
| 1993 | Ang Boyfriend Kong Gamol |
| 1994 | Ikaw Ang Miss Universe ng Buhay Ko |
| 1995 | Bikini Watch |
| 1996 | Where D' Girls 'R |
| 1998 | Tataynic |
| 2001 | Tusong Twosome |
| 2001 | Weyt A Minit, Kapeng Mainit |
| 2002 | D'Uragons |
| 2002 | Home Along Da Riber |

=== Story ===
| Year | Title |
|---|---|
| 1959 | Bulilit Al Calpone |
| 1964 | Mga Dariling Ginto |
| 1964 | Bilis at Tapang |
| 1964 | Adre, Ayos Na! Ang Buto-Buto |
| 1964 | Pitong Desperada |
| 1965 | Babaeng Kidlat |
| 1965 | 7 Mata-Hari |
| 1965 | Ana-Roberta |
| 1965 | Target: Sexy Rose |
| 1966 | Mula na Kita'y Ibigin |
| 1966 | Ikaw ... Ang Gabi at Ang Awit |
| 1966 | Whisper to the Wind |
| 1966 | Doble Trece |
| 1966 | Counter Spy |
| 1966 | Agent Wooly Booly at Ang 7 Bikini |
| 1967 | Pambihirang Pito |
| 1967 | Let's Merry Go Round |
| 1967 | Alexander Bilis |
| 1967 | Alias Chain Gang |
| 1968 | Honey and West |
| 1968 | Ang Banal, Ang Ganid, At Ang Pusakal |
| 1970 | Machine Gun Johnny and the Sexy Queen |
| 1971 | Sanga-Sangang Apoy |
| 1971 | Banderang Kapos |
| 1972 | The Young Idols |
| 1972 | Kumander Dayang-Dayang |
| 1972 | Notorious |
| 1972 | Itik-Itik |
| 1973 | Kasing-Kasing Ko |
| 1975 | Jack and Jill and John |
| 1976 | Beloy and the Kid |
| 1976 | Fiesta: Isang Halik! Isang Sayaw! Isang Peseta! |
| 1981 | Teacher's Pet |
| 1981 | San Basilio |
| 1985 | John & Marsha '85: Sa Probinsiya |
| 1985 | Goatbuster: Sa Templo ni Dune |
| 1987 | Binibining Tsuperman |
| 1989 | Wooly Booly: Ang Classmate Kong Alien |
| 1990 | Toosie Wootsie: Ang Bandang Walang Atrasan |
| 1990 | Wooly Booly 2: Ang Classmate Kong Alien |
| 1991 | Pitong Gamol |
| 1992 | Pretty Boy |
| 1992 | Alabang Girls |
| 1993 | Ang Boyfriend Kong Gamol |
| 1996 | Where D' Girls 'R |
| 1998 | Tataynic |
| 2001 | Tusong Twosome |
| 2001 | Weyt A Minit, Kapeng Mainit |
| 2002 | D'Uragons |

=== Writer ===
| Year | Title |
|---|---|
| 1967 | Sa Manlulupig 'Di Ka Pasisiil |
| 1968 | Daredevil |
| 1968 | Bawat Kanto Basagulo |

=== Adaptation ===
| Year | Title |
|---|---|
| 1986 | Kalabog En Bosyo Strike Again |

=== Actor ===
| Year | Title |
|---|---|
| 1991 | Humanap Ka ng Pangit |
| 1994 | Ikaw Ang Miss Universe ng Buhay Ko |
