= Humanap Ka ng Panget =

1991 comedy film starring Jimmy Santos and Andrew E.

- Directed by: Ben Feleo
- Screenplay by: Ben Feleo; Ely Matawaran; Vic Jose; Ariel Ureta
- Story by: Ben Feleo
- Produced by: Vic Jose; Ariel Ureta
- Starring: Jimmy Santos; Eddie Gutierrez; Carmi Martin; Nanette Medved; Gelli de Belen; Keempee de Leon; Andrew E.; Dennis Padilla
- Cinematography: Erning dela Paz
- Edited by: Renato de Leon
- Music by: Jimmy Fabregas
- Production company: Viva Films
- Distributed by: Viva Films
- Release date: March 14, 1991
- Running time: 106 minutes
- Country: Philippines
- Language: Filipino

Humanap Ka ng Panget (lit. 'Find Someone Ugly') is a 1991 Filipino comedy film co-written and directed by Ben Feleo. It stars Jimmy Santos and Keempee de Leon, with rapper Andrew E. in his acting debut. It also stars Eddie Gutierrez, Carmi Martin, Gelli de Belen, Nanette Medved, Dennis Padilla, and Kate Gomez. Named after the pop rap song of the same name by Andrew E., the film was released by Viva Films on March 14, 1991.

== Plot ==
Three scavenger brothers: Big Boy, Andy E., and Elvin, along with their dwarf parents, discover that Big Boy, the ugliest of the trio, is the only heir of Luningning, a rich yet ugly tycoon married to a handsome man, Ernesto.

Big Boy takes along his adopted family from their slum community after his biological parents take him in to their mansion, which brings a stroke of luck for both Andy, who becomes a rap superstar, and Elvin, who is able to go to college. Andy falls in love with his manager Nathasia, while Big Boy dates another rich heiress, Fifi, who is actually in love with her servant Edu and is only being prodded to marry Big Boy by her mother Cleo to pay off a debt to Luningning. On Big Boy and Fifi's wedding day, Edu publicly confesses his love to Fifi, who runs off with him to Big Boy's sorrow. A distraught Big Boy attempts to commit suicide by jumping off a balcony, but is dissuaded by Nathasia. The two bond, which briefly arouses Andy's jealousy before Nathasia shrugs it off. However, Big Boy, who has fallen in love with Nathasia, is heartbroken after she rejects Big Boy's marriage proposal, saying she loves Andy. Distraught, Big Boy jumps down an apartment stairwell and is hospitalized.

Big Boy's family and Fifi comfort him at the hospital. Ernesto and Fifi advise him that to find happiness in love, he should not base his judgements on physical beauty or social status but seek one's inner values, prompting Ernesto to tell him to find an ugly person and love her truly. They are interrupted by a commotion from a neighboring room. When they investigate, they come across Madonna, a facially disfigured and traumatized patient hiding in the hospital after witnessing a murder. Fifi and Ernesto set up a match between Madonna and Big Boy, and the two fall in love with each other. After the group fights off Madonna's would-be killers, Madonna undergoes facial surgery. When Madonna reveals that she copied her idol Sharon Cuneta's face, Big Boy leaves, fearing another heartbreak, but Madonna reassures him of her love and the two marry. Later on, Madonna gives birth to a child resembling Luningning, to the shock of the whole family.

== Cast ==
- Jimmy Santos as Big Boy
- Andrew E. as Andy E.
- Eddie Gutierrez as Ernesto
- Carmi Martin as Fifi
- Gelli de Belen as Anna
- Keempee de Leon as Elvin
- Nanette Medved as Nathasia
- Dennis Padilla as Edu
- Kate Gomez as Kate
- Dencio Padilla as Jonathan
- Ruby Rodriguez as Gracia
- Jinky Oda as Tale
- Yoyoy Villame as Cyrano
- Zorayda Sanchez as Luningning
- Jon Achaval as doctor of Luningning
- Dexter Doria as Mrs. Arellano
- Odette Khan as Cleo
- Ben Johnson as Head Doctor
- Wilson Go as priest
- Paeng Giant as father of Big Boy
- Judith
- Eddie Mapile
- Rey Tumenes
- Ronald Asinas
- Gerry Sacdalan
- Rommel Lavado
- Erning Santos
- Richard Santos
- Sharon Cuneta as Madonna
