= Neber 2 Geder =

1996 comedy film by Ben Feleo

Neber 2-Geder
- Official movie poster
- Directed by: Ben Feleo
- Screenplay by: Ben Feleo; Reynaldo Castro
- Story by: Ben Feleo; Ana Santos
- Produced by: William Leary
- Starring: Andrew E.; Redford White
- Cinematography: Ernie dela Paz
- Edited by: Rene Tala
- Music by: Ricky del Rosario
- Production company: Viva Films
- Distributed by: Viva Films
- Release date: April 17, 1996
- Running time: 110 minutes
- Country: Philippines
- Language: Filipino

Neber 2-Geder (also known as Neber 2 Geder) (lit. 'Never Together') is a 1996 Philippine comedy film co-written and directed by Ben Feleo. The film stars Andrew E. and Redford White.

The film is streaming online on YouTube.

== Plot ==
Two roommates of different races, Berto and Tonyo, were not having a good time sharing at their old house and having work within each other until they ended up staying at their boss' mansion while he left on vacation. Their respective families came by and their sisters started a romantic relationship in-between the men while a criminal mastermind was on the hunt for the diamonds that was concealed on a teddy bear.

== Cast ==
- Andrew E. as Berto
- Redford White as Tonyo
- Amanda Page as Carmen
- Cara Marsan as Melba
- Zeny Zabala as of Tonyo's mother
- Ben Tisoy as Berto's father
- Elizabeth Ramsey as Berto's aunt
- Michael de Mesa as Ricky
- Via Veloso as Ricky's Girl ( uncredited )
- Tony Carreon as Senior Mondragon
- Joji dela Paz as Mr. Rivera
- Mykell Chan as Ricky's righthand
- Angel Baldomar as Ricky's bodyguard

== Production ==
The film had a working title Black and White. It was later on changed to its current title due to its slight racial dig.
