= Weyt a Minit, Kapeng Mainit =

Philippine comedy film

- Official movie poster
- Directed by: Ben Feleo
- Written by: Ben Feleo; Ana Santos
- Produced by: Vincent del Rosario III
- Starring: Janno Gibbs; Blakdyak
- Cinematography: Ramon Marcelino
- Edited by: Rene Tala
- Music by: Jaime Fabregas
- Production company: Viva Films
- Distributed by: Viva Films
- Release date: November 14, 2001
- Running time: 115 minutes
- Country: Philippines
- Language: Filipino

Weyt a Minit, Kapeng Mainit is a 2001 Philippine comedy action film co-written and directed by Ben Feleo. The film stars Janno Gibbs and Blakdyak.

The film is streaming online on YouTube.

== Plot ==
Dik and Ado are on the run after witnessing a crime committed by Col. Valentino's men. To prevent being killed the two began disguising as women. They came across a talent agency where they met fellow applicants Joy and Christy who also had problems of their own as well.

== Cast ==
- Janno Gibbs as Dik/Regine / Richard / KC Arespacochaga
- Blakdyak as Ado/ Jaya / Michael Liling
- Geneva Cruz as Joy
- Angela Velez as Christy
- Rez Cortez as Col. Valentino
- Roldan Aquino as Scarface
- Dexter Doria as Madam Amparing
- Dinky Doo Jr. as Badong
- Joji dela Paz as Mr. Kabayushi
- Goms Burza as Bodyguard
- Ronald Asinas as Bodyguard
- Mystica as Mimosa
- Cecille Iñigo as Lady at Bus
- Whitney Tyson as Claudia
- Raul Dillo as Father
- Boy Roque as Escobar
- Jack Barri as Ship Captain
- Mykell Chan as Interpol Agent
