= Chiquito (actor) =

Filipino actor-politician

Vice Mayor of Makati
- In office August 24, 1989 – March 11, 1992
- Mayor: Jejomar Binay
- Preceded by: Conchitina Sevilla-Bernardo
- Succeeded by: Roberto Brillante

Member of the Makati City Council Makati Municipal Council (1969–1972, 1988–1989)
- In office June 30, 1995 – July 2, 1997
- Constituency: 1st district
- In office February 2, 1988 – August 24, 1989
- Constituency: Lone district
- In office January 1, 1972 – 1986

Personal details
- Born: Augusto Valdes Pangan; March 12, 1932 Manila, Philippine Islands
- Died: July 2, 1997 (aged 65) Makati, Philippines
- Resting place: Manila North Cemetery
- Party: Independent (1971–1978, 1987–1988, 1994–1997); Kilusang Bagong Lipunan (1978–1986, 1991–1994)
- Spouse: Vilma "Ely" Isidro-Pangan
- Children: 7
- Parent(s): Manuel Pangan and Remedios Valdes
- Occupation: Actor, comedian

Augusto Valdes Pangan Sr. (March 12, 1932 – July 2, 1997), professionally known as Chiquito, was a Filipino actor, comedian, and politician. Celebrated for his physical slapstick and signature deadpan humor, he was a dominant figure during the "Golden Age of Philippine Comedy," starring in dozens of iconic satirical and action-comedy films over a four-decade career.

In addition to his career in entertainment, Pangan was a long-serving public servant in Makati. His political career was highlighted by his tenure as the Vice Mayor of Makati from 1989 to 1992, alongside serving multiple terms as a member of the Makati City Council across three separate decades until his death in 1997.

== Entertainment career ==
=== Early life and career beginnings ===
Chiquito was born Augusto Valdes Pangan in Manila. His entertainment career began at the age of 13, when he appeared in a major musical production at the Manila Grand Opera House. Over the next several years, he became a fixture in the Manila bodabil circuit, gaining popularity for his skill in dancing the boogie-woogie.

=== Cinematic prominence and production ===
Chiquito was befriended by Fernando Poe, Sr., and with Poe's assistance, launched his film career. He broke into films with Sanggano from Palaris Pictures. Over the next five decades, he starred in more than a hundred films, primarily comedies. He established his own production company, Sotang Bastos Productions, named after his favorite film role from the 1950s. He frequently starred in highly popular comedy spoofs of Hollywood genres, such as gangster films and Westerns.

In one of these Western spoofs, The Arizona Kid (1971), he co-starred with Hollywood sex symbol Mamie Van Doren. Chiquito also portrayed the very first male version of Darna in the film Teribol Dobol, preceding Dolphy, who later portrayed a version of the superheroine in Darna, Kuno?. By the 1980s, his brother Rene served as president and general manager of their production companies, Sotang Bastos and Archer Productions.

In 1984, Chiquito was nominated for a FAMAS Best Supporting Actor Award for his role in Lovingly Yours, Helen, a film dramatization of the radio and GMA television show hosted by Helen Vela. In 1988, a film reuniting Chiquito with Dolphy titled Basura Gang was planned but did not materialize.

=== 1990s acting hiatus and career comeback ===
Following his projects in the late 1980s, Pangan took an extended hiatus from the entertainment industry to focus exclusively on his responsibilities as Vice Mayor of Makati and his subsequent 1992 campaign for the Philippine Senate.

After a six-year absence from the screen, Chiquito made a high-profile showbiz comeback in 1994, teaming up with rapper-comedian Andrew E. in the Viva Films comedy Pinagbiyak Na Bunga (Lookalayk). The movie was a major commercial success and spawned a television spin-off that same year titled Puno't Bunga, produced by Studio Viva and broadcast on the GMA Network. Following this successful return, he spent his remaining years playing prominent supporting roles in major features, including Ang Pagbabalik ni Pedro Penduko opposite Janno Gibbs, Bangers alongside Joey de Leon, and Strict ang Parents Ko under Viva Films.

== Political career ==
Chiquito balanced his career in entertainment with a long-standing involvement in local politics. He was elected three times as a member of the municipal council of Makati, serving from 1972 to 1986, 1988 to 1989, and from 1995 until his death in 1997.

Following his council terms, he served a brief stint as the Vice Mayor of Makati from 1989 to 1992 under Mayor Jejomar Binay. In the 1992 national elections, Chiquito launched an unsuccessful campaign for a seat in the Senate of the 9th Congress. Throughout his political career, he maintained an affiliation with the Kilusang Bagong Lipunan party.

== Personal life and death ==
Pangan was married to Vilma "Ely" Isidro-Pangan, with whom he had seven children. Outside of his career in entertainment and local government, he was an avid sports enthusiast, dedicating his later years to shooting and motorcycling.

In early 1997, Pangan was diagnosed with liver cancer. He died at the age of 65 due to liver cancer at the Makati Medical Center on July 2, 1997, surrounded by his family. Following his passing, Philippine media widely mourned his loss, famously calling July 2 "the day the laughter died" in honor of his decades-long contribution to comedy. He was survived by his widow and children, and his remains were interred at the Manila North Cemetery.

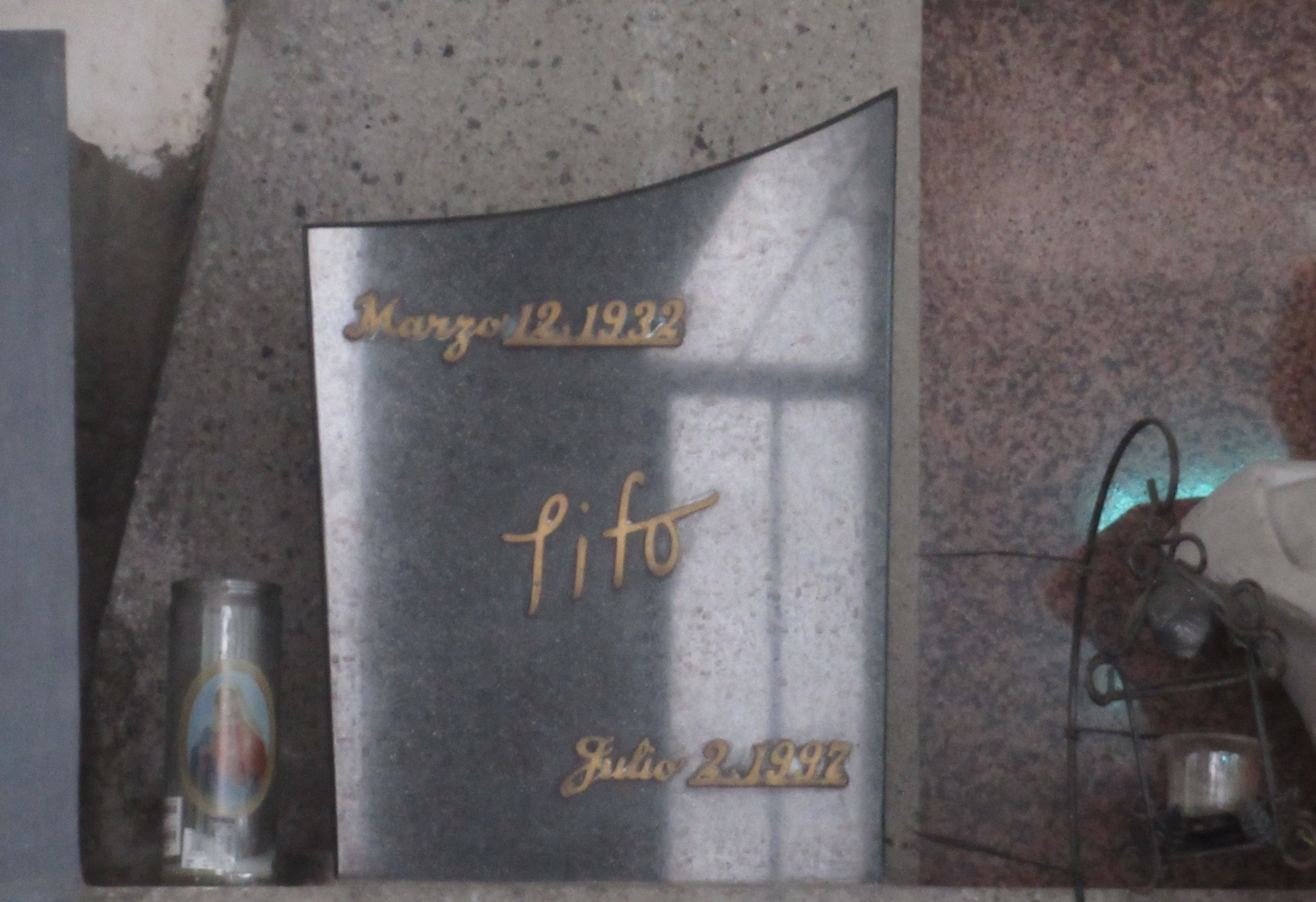
Chiquito's grave at Manila North Cemetery.

== Filmography ==
=== Film ===
Year	Title	Credited as		Role	Note(s)	Ref(s).
Year	Title	Director	Actor	Role	Note(s)	Ref(s).
1947	Sanggano	No	Yes			
1957	Phone Pal	No	Yes			
1958	Lutong Makaw	No	Yes			
1958	Be My Love	No	Yes			
1958	Fighting Tisoy	No	Yes			
1958	Obra-Maestra	No	Yes			
1958	Mr. Basketball	No	Yes			
1958	Atrebida	No	Yes			
1958	Lo' Waist Gang at si Og sa Mindoro	No	Yes			
1958	4 na Pulubi	No	Yes			
1959	Mekeni, Abe	No	Yes			
1962	Gorio and His Jeepney	No	Yes	Gorio		
1962	Adiong Sikat ng Tondo	No	Yes	Adiong Sikat		
1962	Walang Susuko	No	Yes			
1962	Gorio: Kahapon, Ngayon at Bukas	No	Yes			
1962	Hindi Tayo Talo	No	Yes			
1962	Kapitan Tornado	No	Yes			
1962	Gulo Kung Gulo	No	Yes			
1962	Lagay Muna	No	Yes			
1962	Operasyong Bayong	No	Yes			
1962	Markang Demonyo	No	Yes			
1962	Sobra sa Init, Kulang sa Lamig	No	Yes			
1963	Ikaw Na ang Mag-Ako	No	Yes			
1963	Ang Mahiwagang Lampara	No	Yes			
1963	Bulilit Al Capone	No	Yes	Propesor Atong		
1963	3 Desperados	No	Yes			
1963	Via Europa	No	Yes			
1963	Ulilang Cowboy	No	Yes			
1963	Mr. Wong	No	Yes	Mr. Wong		
1964	Karate Squad	No	Yes			
1964	Alyas Fumanchu	No	Yes	Fumanchu	Dual role	
1964	Adre, Ayos Na!.. (Ang Buto-Buto)	No	Yes			
1964	Adiong Untouchable	No	Yes	Adiong	Everybody's Productions' initial offering	
1964	Pulis Walang Kaparis	No	Yes			
1964	Dimas Kadena	No	Yes			
1964	James Ban-dong	No	Yes	James Band-ong, Agent 02-10		
1964	Pinoy Beatles	No	Yes			
1964	Mabilis.... Paa at Kamay	No	Yes		Kayumanggi Cinema's initial offering	
1964	Angkan ni Limahong	No	Yes	Limahong	DES Productions' initial offering	
1964	Lumuluhang Komiko	No	Yes			
1964	Mr. Wong vs. Mistico	No	Yes	Mr. Wong		
1966	Iyo ang Norte, Akin ang Sur	No	Yes	Batang Pasay		
1966	Kilabot ng Luzon	No	Yes			
1966	Mga Abilidad sa Akong	No	Yes	Agent BB-10-BB-10		
1966	Mr. Walastik Laging May Atik	No	Yes	Mr. Walastik		
1966	Mr. Thunderball	No	Yes	Agent 02-10		
1966	Doble Solo	No	Yes	Agent 02-10		
1966	Mr. Humble Boy (Ang Dating Kampeon)	Yes	Yes		Sotang Bastos Productions's initial offering	
1966	Jack En Poy	No	Yes			
1966	Dragon Squad	No	Yes			
1966	Apat Na Ipo-ipo	No	Yes			
1966	Sexy sa Labanan	Yes	Yes	Augustina	Also story writer	
1966	Target: Sexy Rose	No	Yes			
1967	Palekerong Kutsero	No	Yes		Gretas Productions' initial offering	
1967	Mister 8 Ball	Yes	Yes	Mister 8 Ball	Also writer	
1967	Wild, Wild Wong	No	Yes	Ago / Mr. Wong		
1967	Samuel Bilibid	Yes	Yes	Samuel Bilibid	Also writer	
1967	Okey Ka Choy	Yes	Yes			
1967	No Read, No Write	No	Yes			
1967	Pobres Park	No	Yes			
1967	The Pogi Dozen	No	Yes			
1968	Mister Gimmick	Yes	Yes		Also writer	
1968	Isang Libong Mukha	No	Yes		Also story writer	
1968	Agents: Wen Manong	No	Yes			
1968	Jeepney King	No	Yes	Gorio		
1968	The Magnificent Zorro	No	Yes	Zorro	Also story writer	
1968	May I Go Out?	No	Yes			
1968	Kiko en Kikay	No	Yes	Kiko		
1968	Sapagkat Ako'y Pangit Lamang	No	Yes			
1968	Hari ng Yabang	No	Yes			
1968	Prettyboy Playboy	Yes	Yes			
1968	The Hornets	No	Yes			
1969	Pangit Squad	No	Yes			
1969	Ponso Villa and the Sexy Mexicanas	Yes	Yes	Ponso Villa		
1969	Strike Everywhere	No	Yes			
1969	Pa-Bandying-Bandying	No	Yes			
1969	Mr. Wong Strikes Again	Yes	Yes	Mr. Wong		
1969	Franco Negro	Yes	Yes	Franco Negro		
1969	"Che" Charon	No	Yes	"Che" Charon		
1969	Wrong to Be Born	No	Yes		Viltra's initial offering	
1969	Atorni Agaton (Agent Law-Ko)	Yes	Yes	Agaton	Also writer	
1970	James Bondat	No	Yes	Agent Bond-tis	Also story writer	
1970	Lord Forgive Me	Yes	Yes		Also writer	
1970	Servillano Zapata	Yes	Yes	Servillano Zapata	Also writer	
1970	Arizona Kid	No	Yes	Ambo, the Arizona Kid		
1971	The Marijuana Kid	Yes	Yes		Also writer	
1971	Pobreng Alindahaw	No	Yes			
1971	The Prince and I	No	Yes			
1972	David at Goliath	No	Yes	David Dimagiba		
1972	Naku Poooo!	Yes	Yes		Also story writer	
1972	Fist to Kill	No	Yes		RSJ Productions' initial offering	
1972	Isla Limasawa	No	Yes		Archer Productions' initial offering	
1973	Prinsipe Abante	No	Yes	Prinsipe Abante		
1973	Telebong, Telebong, Telebong	No	Yes		Gerald Productions' initial offering	
1974	Bamboo Gods and Iron Men	No	Yes	Charley		
1974	Jack en the Magic Beans	No	Yes	Jack	Also story writer	
1974	Ulong Pugot... Naglalagot!	No	Yes			
1974	Dynamite Wong and T.N.T. Jackson	No	Yes	Dynamite Wong	Released in the United States as TNT Jackson	
1974	Mr. Pogi and D' Crazy Chicks	Yes	Yes		Also story writer	
1974	Enter Garote	No	Yes			
1975	Ang Magician: Tito the Great	No	Yes	Tito		
1975	Chikiting Gubat	Yes	Yes		Also story writer	
1975	Lorelei	No	Yes			
1975	Kenkoy En Rosing	No	Yes			
1975	Teribol Dobol	No	Yes			
1975	Jack of All Trades (Master of None!)	No	Yes			
1975	Mr. Pogi Part II	Yes	Yes			
1975	Ito ang Daigdig nina Pepe En Pilar	No	Yes			
1976	Ang Erpat Kong Groovy (Baduy Naman)	No	Yes			
1976	Mister Yoso	No	Yes			
1976	Boss, Basta Ikaw (Wa 'Na 'Kong Sey)	No	Yes			
1976	International Playboy	Yes	Yes		Also writer	
1976	Oo Nga't Pangit, Pero Lintik	No	Yes			
1976	Barok	No	Yes		Barok	
1977	Mr. Wong and the Bionic Girls	No	Yes	Mr. Wong		
1977	Tinimbang Ka, Bakit Husto?	No	Yes			
1977	Big Happening ni Chikiting En Iking	Yes	Yes		Also writer	
1977	Asiong Aksaya	No	Yes	Asiong Aksaya		
1977	Herkulas	No	Yes			
1977	Maga-Patuka Na Lang Ako sa Ahas	No	Yes			
1977	Ang Darling Ko'y Aswang	No	Yes			
1978	Kaming Patok Na Patok	No	Yes			
1978	Ang Mabait, ang Masungit at ang Pangit	No	Yes		Also story writer	
1978	Agent Playboy, Alyas Jeproks	No	Yes			
1978	Block Busters	No	Yes			
1978	Pete Matipid	Yes	Yes		Also story writer	
1978	The Wild Grease	No	Yes			
1979	Tatay Na Barok	Yes	Yes			
1979	Vontes V	No	Yes			
1979	Si Gorio at ang Damong Ligaw	No	Yes			
1979	Al Magat's Mang Kepweng	No	Yes	Mang Kepweng		
1980	Peter Maknat	Yes	Yes	Peter Maknat	Also writer	
1980	Awat Na, Asiong Aksaya	No	Yes	Asiong Aksaya		
1980	Goriong Butete	No	Yes	Gorio		
1980	Lasing Master	No	Yes			
1980	Six Million Centavo Man	No	Yes			
1980	Rocky Tu-Log	No	Yes	Rocky		
1980	'Eto Na Naman si Asiong Aksaya	No	Yes	Asiong Aksaya		
1981	Pamilya Antik	No	Yes			
1981	Takbo... Peter... Takbo!	Yes	Yes	Peter	Also writer	
1981	Milyonaryong Gipit	No	Yes			
1981	Kumander Surot	No	Yes	Kumander Surot		
1981	Mother, Mother, I Am Sick... Call Mang Kepweng Very Quick!	No	Yes	Mang Kepweng		
1981	Boljak	No	Yes	Boljak		
1981	Adiong Bulutong	Yes	Yes	Adiong Bulutong	Also writer	
1981	Mister Kwekong	No	Yes	Mister Kwekong		
1981	Patok	No	Yes	Patok		
1982	Kalog at Kidlat	No	Yes			
1982	Mr. Wong Meets Jesse & James	No	Yes	Mr. Wong		
1982	Pete Makulit	Yes	Yes	Pete Makulit	Also writer	
1982	Mga Alagad ng Kuwadradong Mesa	No	Yes	Sir Lansilat	Also story writer	
1982	Tokwa't Baboy	No	Yes			
1983	Wrong Mistake	No	Yes			
1983	Ang Kawawang Koboy	No	Yes			
1983	E.T. Is Estong Tutong	No	Yes	Estong Tutong	Also executive producer	
1983	Mang Kepweng and Son	No	Yes	Mang Kepweng		
1984	Lovingly Yours, Helen (The Movie)	No	Yes		"Nang Maupos ang Kandila" segment	
1985	Magbiro Ka sa Lasing, 'Wag Lang sa Bagong Gising	No	Yes			
1985	Nagalit ang Patay sa Haba ng Lamay	No	Yes			
1985	High Blood	No	Yes	Silbestre Pantalon		
1986	Rocky Four-Ma	No	Yes	Rocky		
1986	Praybet Depektib Akademi	No	Yes	Pete dela Cruz		
1986	Sobra Na... Tama Na... Asiong Aksaya!	No	Yes	Asiong Aksaya		
1986	The Buelta Force	No	Yes			
1987	Balandra Crossing	No	Yes			
1987	Nonoy Garote and the Sidekicks	No	Yes	Nonoy Garote		
1988	Gorio Punasan, Rebel Driver	No	Yes	Gorio Punasan		
1988	Code Name: Black & White	No	Yes	Blacky		
1990	Legend of the Lost Dragon	No	Yes			
1994	Pinagbiyak Na Bunga (Lookalayk)	No	Yes	Berto		
1994	Ang Pagbabalik ni Pedro Penduko	No	Yes	Abraham		
1995	Bangers	No	Yes	Hop Hibang		
1995	Ang Syota Kong Balikbayan	No	Yes	Greg/Gorio		
1996	Strict ang Peyrents Ko	No	Yes	Pulgoso		

- 1980 – Zodiac Connection [UNCONFIRMED] (Sotang Bastos Productions)
- 1980 – Si Ali-masag sa Maynila (Mercedes Films)
- 1983 – Estong Tutong, Ikalawang Yugto
- 1984 – Kung Tawagin Siya'y Bahala Na (Archer Productions)

=== Television ===
Year	Title	Role	Notes
1966	Gorio and His Jeepney	Gorio	
1968	The Chiquito Show		

=== Theatre ===
Year	Title	Role	Venue	Ref.
1959	Kanditalo		Manila Grand Opera House	
