= Raketeros =

2013 comedy film by Randy Santiago

- Directed by: Randy Santiago
- Screenplay by: Woodrow Serafin; Randy Santiago; Dennis Padilla
- Story by: Randy Santiago; Dennis Padilla
- Produced by: Harlene Bautista-Sarmenta; Herminio "Butch" Bautista; Hero Bautista
- Starring: Herbert Bautista; Dennis Padilla; Long Mejia; Andrew E.; Ogie Alcasid
- Cinematography: A.B. Garcia
- Edited by: Vanessa U. De Leon
- Music by: Randy Santiago; Rey Cantong
- Production company: Heaven's Best Entertainment
- Distributed by: Star Cinema
- Release date: August 7, 2013
- Running time: 103 minutes
- Country: Philippines
- Language: Filipino
- Box office: ₱4,616,940.00

Raketeros is a 2013 Filipino comedy film directed by Randy Santiago from a screenplay he co-wrote with Woodrow Serafin and Dennis Padilla, who co-developed the story concept with Santiago. Starring Herbert Bautista, Dennis Padilla, Long Mejia, Andrew E., and Ogie Alcasid, the story follows five friends who are in trouble while they are looking for a luxurious dress that they lost after their party the night before.

Produced by Heaven's Best Entertainment and distributed by ABS-CBN Film Productions, the film was theatrically released on August 7, 2013, as a feature presentation for the latter entity's 20th anniversary.

== Plot ==
Berto (Herbert Bautista), who works as a lineman in a cable company and lives with his only daughter Danica (Eula Caballero); Mando (Dennis Padilla), a billiards player who is estranged with his daughter Lyka (Karen Reyes); Julio (Ogie Alcasid), a part-time singer; and Andoy (Andrew E) a ‘religious priest’, was invited by their wealthy haciendero friend Don Miguel (Joey Marquez) for the 18th birthday of his daughter Juicy (Tippy Dos Santos). Don Miguel tasked his driver, Mulong (Long Mejia), to fetch his friends, as well as to bring Juicy's birthday gown, which was designed and made in Paris, France. The gown is estimated to cost $50,000 or ₱2,000,000. Mulong first fetched Berto after he was almost killed after being seduced by a woman. Berto didn't know that Mulong has a huge feelings for him. They then went to Mando and saved him from a group of men after Mando won PHP. 1,000,000 in a billiards contest. They went next to Julio in a funeral and to Andoy.

While at a gasoline station to buy food for their trip, Berto, Mando, Julio, and Andoy met four lovely ladies named Winter (Wendy Valdez), Spring (Regine Angeles), Summer (Sam Pinto), and Fall (RR Enriquez). But their yellow Hummer would become a target of a carnapping syndicate. At night, they went to a high-end nightclub for some drinks. Mulong, who was drunk, slept inside their Hummer. What he didn't know, two men took the Hummer while Berto, Mando, Julio, and Andoy were having fun. When the Hummer reached the warehouse, Mulong was taken hostage by the carnapping syndicate. The four men woke up, realizing that the Hummer and Mulong were already gone. Mulong took the opportunity to call Berto and tell him what happened to him. But the two men woke up, and Mulong put his cellphone down. Berto heard one of the men calling a restaurant, ordering a pizza. Upon hearing the address of the warehouse, they hurriedly ran to save Mulong. They used a tourist bus to get to the warehouse along with tourists from South Korea. The leader of the syndicate, Dante (Mark Gil), saw Mulong and was recognized by Winter, Spring, Summer, and Fall, all of whom are also a part of the syndicate. Upon reaching the warehouse, a pizza delivery rider came. Berto disguised himself as a delivery rider in order for him and his friends to enter the warehouse. But Winter recognized Berto, and a fight ensued. Mulong was saved, as well as the gown. As Berto, Mando, Julio, and Andoy were about to leave, they were chased, and one of the syndicate men shot a grenade launcher near the Hummer, causing the Hummer to fall into the river. As Juicy arrived after a stay in a beach resort with her friends, as well as Danica and Lyka, Miguel told her that her gown had not yet been brought by Mulong. When Don Miguel heard that Mulong might had an accident, and was heard by Lyka and Danica, in a fit of disgrace, he decided not to push through with the party. Mando, Julio, Andoy, and Berto luckily survived, but Juicy's gown was already torn. But Andoy said to bring the gown to Juicy by hook or by crook. Berto, Mando, Julio, Andoy, and Mulong arrived at Don Miguel's mansion. The party was cosplay-themed. A mysterious visitor wearing a Darth Vader costume is one of Don Miguel's friends. Upon removing his headgear, it was Dante, the leader of the carnapping syndicate, who took the Hummer and kidnapped Mulong. Berto told Dante that they would let go of what happened and told him to change his racket, and Dante said that he would think about it. When Miguel saw Juicy wearing the gown, he was confused about the gown due to the fight that happened. But he said that it's alright and that Juicy liked it. The birthday party ended with fireworks and became a concert-like party.

== Cast ==
=== Main cast ===
- Herbert Bautista as Berto
- Dennis Padilla as Mando
- Long Mejia as Mulong
- Andrew E. as Andoy
- Ogie Alcasid as Julio

=== Supporting cast ===
- Joey Marquez as Don Miguel
- Mark Gil as Dante
- Sam Pinto as Summer
- Ryan Bang as Bryan Bang
- Wendy Valdez as Winter
- RR Enriquez as Fall
- Regine Angeles as Spring
- Tippy Dos Santos as Juicy
- Rodjun Cruz as Rainier
- Eula Caballero as Danica Mote
- Karen Reyes as Lyca
- Markki Stroem as Mark
- Ryan Boyce as Paolo
- Ya Chang
- IC Mendoza as Krisey
- Ahwel Paz
- Patricia Ismael
- Lassy Marquez as Claudine

=== Cameo appearance ===
- Rufa Mae Quinto as Sol
- Nova Villa
- Jaime Fabregas
- Dimples Romana as Mando's ex-wife
- Jay Manalo
- Roi Vinzon
- Cherry Pie Picache
- Janice de Belen
- Regine Velasquez
- Roldan Aquino
- Jong Cuenco
- Niña Jose
