= Mahirap Maging Pogi =

1992 comedy film starring Andrew E.

- Movie poster
- Directed by: Ben Feleo
- Screenplay by: Ben Feleo; Dan Salamante; Reynaldo Castro; Ely Matawaran
- Story by: Ben Feleo
- Produced by: William C. Leary
- Starring: Andrew E.
- Cinematography: Ernie dela Paz
- Edited by: Efren "Loging" Jarlego
- Music by: Mon del Rosario
- Production company: Viva Films
- Distributed by: Viva Films
- Release date: August 19, 1992
- Running time: 100 minutes
- Country: Philippines
- Language: Filipino

Mahirap Maging Pogi (lit. 'It Is Hard to Be Handsome') is a 1992 Filipino comedy film written and directed by Ben Feleo. The film stars Andrew E., along with Dennis Padilla, Gelli de Belen, Ruby Rodriguez, Ogie Alcasid, Janno Gibbs, Anjo Yllana, Ana Roces, Lea Orosa, Mia Pratts, Almira Muhlach, Patrick Guzman, Michael de Mesa and Roi Vinzon. Named after Andrew E.'s rap song of the same name, the film was produced by Viva Films and released on August 19, 1992.

Critic Justino Dormiendo of the Manila Standard gave the film a negative review, criticizing it as "downright ugly" and "not much fun".

== Plot ==
Parding is regarded as handsome in their province where girls of all kinds fall for him. Soon after, he leaves the province and tries his luck in Manila. He meets a group of hustlers led by Dodong and Gigi. Dodong and Gigi decided to let him stay in their home but things turn disastrous for them as most of Dodong's group members experience a series of mishaps. But after Dodong (with Siano and Dodie) prevents a bank robbery and saves a group of production people from a television station, they are rewarded by the owner's brother Robert. Dodong decides to ask for employment at the station for himself, Parding, and his friends as a reward and his request was granted.

While the whole gang was working at the station as utility men, Parding came across a DJ booth where he was amazed by the skills of a disc jockey whose rapping skills and memory were beyond exemplary even when drunk. But the next day the disc jockey was dead drunk and Parding had no choice but to take over the radio show. His voice and rap skills immediately gained lots of fans, particularly a blind girl named Annie and Ingrid, the station owner and Robert's sister who always gets beaten by her husband Gabby. Soon after, Parding meets both Annie and Ingrid on separate occasions. Parding promises Annie he will pay for her operation while with Ingrid (with whom he initially gets romantically involved with) he was able to discover that not only she is a battered wife but her husband is also involved in various illegal activities. During a pay-off between Gabby and his associate Richard on the television station, they discovered that their transaction was televised nationwide by Ingrid, Robert and Parding.Soon after discovering the blackmail, both Gabby and Richard tried to escape with their respective henchmen but were successfully apprehended by Dodong, Parding, Gigi and the rest of the gang.

Ingrid decides to help Annie get the operation by covering the expenses. Soon after, Annie recovers, with her eyesight back, and finally gets to see Parding, the radio guy with the mysterious voice.

== Cast ==
- Andrew E. as Parding Pogi
- Dennis Padilla as Dodong Boogie
- Gelli de Belen as Gigi
- Ruby Rodriguez as May
- Ogie Alcasid as Dodie
- Janno Gibbs as Siano
- Anjo Yllana as Jojo
- Ana Roces as Annie
- Joji Isla as Supervisor
- Lea Orosa as Brenda Muñoz
- Mia Pratts as Ingrid Mondragon
- Almira Muhlach as Mari
- Patrick Guzman as Robert Mondragon
- Michael de Mesa as Gabby
- Roi Vinzon as Richard
- Jinky Oda as Yaya
- Jessa Zaragoza as Jezebel
- Jojo de Cresta as Joanne
- Jon Achaval as Frederick Newman
- Elizabeth Alvarez as Elizabeth Alvarez
- Errol Dionisio as Joey Boy de Sastro
- Mary Walter as Annie's grandmother
- Levi Celerio as Annie's grandfather

Former radio disc jockey and GMA News personality Mike Enriquez (1951–2023) appeared in the film in a cameo role.

== Production ==
Filming took place from July 2 to 22, 1992. Most of the scenes were shot at the Broadcast City in Old Balara, Quezon City.

== Release ==
Mahirap Maging Pogi was released on August 19, 1992.

=== Critical response ===
Justino Dormiendo, writing for the Manila Standard, gave Mahirap Maging Pogi a negative review, criticizing it as "downright ugly" for its central ironic joke of Andrew E.'s character being seen as handsome even though he is not, and stated that "Ugliness is never a virtue especially if it is used to deceive the viewer." He also noted that the film is "not much fun and the gags are hardly original", citing its general use of toilet humor and a subplot which directly imitates the main storyline from Charlie Chaplin's 1931 film City Lights.
