= Elizabeth Ramsey =

Filipina stand-up comedian, singer and actress

- Ramsey watching the show Your Face Sounds Familiar Season 1 in 2015
- Born: Elizabeth Indino Ramsey; December 3, 1931; San Carlos, Negros Occidental, Philippine Islands
- Died: October 8, 2015 (aged 83); Manila, Philippines
- Occupations: Stand-up comedian, singer, actress
- Years active: 1958–2015
- Spouse: Isaac Johnson Sr. (m. 1951; died 1959)
- Children: 4 (including Jaya)

Elizabeth Indino Ramsey (December 3, 1931 – October 8, 2015) was a Filipina singer, comedian, and actress. During her almost six-decade career, she established herself as an iconic showbiz personality and entertainer. Ramsey's unique appearance courtesy of her Filipino-Jamaican blood, stage antics, irreverent humor, and punchlines delivered in her heavy Visayan accent brought her into prominence in the Filipino entertainment industry. She is also the mother of popular Filipina singer Jaya.

== Early life ==
Ramsey was born on December 3, 1931, in San Carlos City, Negros Occidental, to Arturo C. Ramsey, a United States merchant marine of Jamaican descent who was stationed in the Philippines, and Marcelina Rivera Indino; born in San Carlos City to a family of Filipino and Spanish descent.

== Career ==
Ramsey's career began in 1958 after winning a singing contest in Student Canteen, the first noontime show on Philippine television. After her win, Ramsey was immediately offered a slot to be a performer at the Manila Grand Opera House and then eventually the famous Clover Theater. Her raspy vocals and energetic live performances of rock and roll songs earned her the title as the country's "Queen of Rock and Roll". Some of her trademark songs include "Proud Mary", "Razzle Dazzle", and "Waray-Waray".

As early as 1961, she began performing in Las Vegas and different parts of the United States. She became the first Filipino to star in the Philippine Festival Las Vegas production of producer Steve Parker, ex-husband of actress Shirley MacLaine. She performed for soldiers in American bases in the Philippines and on the USS Enterprise for wounded American servicemen during the Vietnam War. Ramsey also ventured into acting and starred in notable films including Prinsesa Naranja (1960), Reyna ng Pitong Gatang (1980), and Ang Bukas ay Akin (1963), in which she was nominated for best supporting actress in the 1963 FAMAS Awards for her performance. In 1976, she gained household name status after playing Cleopatra in a popular Superwheel Detergent Bar commercial.

In the 1990s, she returned to the Philippines after living in the United States for several years and made a successful comeback by appearing in numerous movies and TV shows.

== Personal life ==
Ramsey had 4 children (Isaac Johnson Jr., Mary Ann Johnson, Susan Johnson and Maria Luisa Ramsey). She was married to Black American US military merchant marine, Isaac Johnson Sr.

== Death ==
Ramsey died October 8, 2015, in her sleep from a hyperglycemic attack at the age of 83.

== Filmography ==
=== Film ===
Year	Title	Role	Note(s)	Ref(s).
1958	Mga Liham kay Tiya Dely		Third segment	
1958	Ang Lo'Waist Gang at si Og sa Mindoro			
1959	Ipinagbili Kami ng Aming Tatay			
1960	Beatnik			
1960	Prinsesa Naranja			
1962	Pitong Atsay			
1962	In This Corner			
1963	Pinakamalaking Takas ng 7 Atsay			
1963	Ang Bukas Ay Akin!			
1964	Mga Kanang Kamay			
1964	Let's Go			
1964	Jukebox Jamboree			
1964	Pinoy Beatles			
1964	Eddie Long Legs			
1964	Mga Guerrera			
1967	D' Soul Beats			
1969	Petrang Paminta			
1969	The Musical Giant			
1970	Areglado, Boss!			
1972	Pearly Shells			
1972	Sa Jeepney ang Hirap, sa Goodtime ang Sarap			
1972	Trubador			
1973	Ato ti Bondying			
1974	Vilma and the Beep Beep Minica			
1976	Divino (The Blessed Man)			
1976	Barok			
1980	Reyna ng Pitong Gatang			
1996	Neber 2 Geder	Andrew's aunt		
1996	Hindi Ako Ander (Itanong Mo Kay Kumander)	Matilda		
