= Dennis Padilla =

Filipino actor and comedian

Member of the Caloocan City Council from 2nd District
- In office June 30, 1998 – June 30, 2007

Personal details
- Born: Dennis Esteban Dominguez Baldivia; February 9, 1962 (age 64) Caloocan, Rizal, Philippines
- Party: Independent (2024–present)
- Other political affiliations: Aksyon Demokratiko (until 2012; 2021–2024); UNA (2012–2021)
- Spouse: Marjorie Barretto (m. 1995; ann. 2009)
- Children: 7 (incl. Julia Barretto)
- Parent(s): Dencio Padilla; Catalina Dominguez
- Occupation: Actor, comedian, radio broadcaster, politician

Dennis Esteban Dominguez Baldivia (born February 9, 1962), popularly known as Dennis Padilla (Tagalog pronunciation: [paˈdilja]), is a Filipino comedian, TV host, radio broadcaster and actor. He is the son of the late Dencio Padilla, and the father of actress Julia Barretto.

He was elected councilor of Caloocan from 1998 to 2007. In the 2013 elections, he ran for Board Member in his home province, Laguna but lost. His partymates in the 3rd district includes actress and incumbent board member Angelica Jones, (former ABS-CBN) journalist Sol Aragones, first term congresswoman (Legislative District Representative), and ER Ejercito, the incumbent governor of Laguna.

In 2017, Padilla was appointed as one of the board members of the Movie and Television Review and Classification Board (MTRCB).

== Personal life ==
Padilla has seven children. In 1990, Padilla separated from Monina Gatus, after having 2 children. Eldest, Luis Emmanuel Gatus Baldivia finished Political Science and Government at De La Salle University in 2013, earning Master of Business Administration Public Administration at UP Diliman in 2020. He works as associate project officer at Development Academy of the Philippines. His eldest daughter is a trans woman, Diane Gatus with Diane Baldiva, born on January 2, 1990, and legally married Katx Balmes in USA.

With Padilla's mid-1990 relationship, he married Marjorie Barretto in 1995. Eldest Julia Barretto was born in 1997, while Claudia Isabelle was born on July 26, 1999, who released her first single "Stay" in 2017, signing with Viva Artists Agency as a talent. She finished Bachelor of Arts Psychology at the Ateneo de Manila University in 2022. Leon Marcux was born on April 2, 2003, and is a Dean's Lister, studying Marketing at University of Asia and the Pacific in 2023. Padilla and Marjorie Barretto separated in 2007, and their marriage was annulled in 2009.

On August 1, 2014, Padilla, assisted by Attorney Jose Virgilio "JV" Bautista, filed with RTC, Branch 126, Quezon City, a Petition to Annul a Court decision which allowed Claudia Isabelle to use Barretto instead of Baldivia as legal surname.

In a 12 years romance, from 2009, Padilla's journey with former 2022 Mrs. Universe Australia Linda Marie Gorton ended in July 2020. Their son Gavin Simeon was born on August 29, 2012, graduating kindergarten in 2017 at Castle Ville Academy in Project 7, Quezon City. Madelyn, the second child was born on November 30, 2016. In an April 12, 2024 interview with Aster Amoyo, Padilla claimed their co-parenting with child support, which Linda Gorton denied. Padilla also has 2 stepdaughters Dani Barretto, of Kier Legaspi and Rizzi Gorton, Linda's child with a previous romance. In 2019, Dani Barretto wed Xavi Panlilio with child Millie, born in 2019.

== Filmography ==
=== Film ===
- Nardong Kutsero (1969)
- Asedillo (1971)
- Totoy Bato (1977)
- Anak ni Waray vs Anak ni Biday (1984) Fundraiser
- Taray at Teroy (1988)
- Wanted: Pamilya Banal (1989)
- Michael and Madonna (1990)
- Shake, Rattle & Roll II ("Kulam" segment; 1990) - Living dead
- Humanap Ka ng Panget (1991)
- Robin Good: Sugod ng Sugod (1991)
- Pitong Gamol (1991) Pepeng
- Ang Utol Kong Hoodlum (1991) - Mel
- Kaputol ng Isang Awit (1991) - Nonong
- Maging Sino Ka Man (1991) - Lebag
- Andrew Ford Medina: 'Wag Kang Gamol! (1991)
- Onyong Majikero (1991) - Gabriel
- Darna (1991)
- Bad Boy II (1992) - Kamote
- Grease Gun Gang (1992) - Panyong Libog
- Blue Jeans Gang (1992)
- Mandurugas (1992) Binoy
- Miss Na Miss Kita: Utol Kong Hoodlum II (1992) Mel
- Alabang Girls (1992) Arthor
- Mahirap Maging Pogi (1992)
- Row 4: Ang Baliktorians (1993) Arnulfo "Aruy" Gonzales
- Astig (1993) Terio
- Makuha Ka sa Tingin: Kung Puede Lang (1993) Tembong
- Pusoy Dos (1994)
- Pintsik (1994) Mando
- Kalabog en Bosyo (1994) kalabog
- Cuadro de Jack (1994) Janggo
- Epifanio Ang Bilas Ko: NB-Eye (1995) Panfilo
- Ang Tipo Kong Lalake: Maginoo Pero Medyo Bastos (1995) Stevan "Junior" Cruz Jr.
- Cara y Cruz: Walang Sinasanto! (1996) Bogard
- A E I O U (1996) Father (uncredited)
- Pablik Enemi 1 n 2: Aksidental Heroes (1997) Sergio
- Si Mokong, si Astig at si Gamol (1997) Astig
- Takot Ako sa Darling Ko! (1997) Angel
- Alamid: Ang Alamat (1998)
- Alipin ng Aliw (1998)
- Bilib Ako sa Iyo (1999) Lukas
- Pepeng Agimat (1999) Capt. Rustico 'Tikboy' Purgana
- Pedro Penduko, Episode II: The Return of the Comeback (2000) Bulag
- Basta Tricycle Driver ... Sweet Lover (2000)
- Minsan Ko Lang Sasabihin (2000) Goyo
- Akala Mo ... (2002) Jun
- Ang Tanging Ina (2003) Eddie
- Asboobs: Asal Bobo (2003)
- Can This Be Love (2005) Tiyo Dodie
- D' Anothers (2005) Mr. Resureccion
- Binibining K (2006) Adrin
- My Only Ü (2008)
- Noy (2010)
- I Do (2010)
- Ang Tanging Ina Mo (Last na 'To!) (2010)
- Who's That Girl? (2011)
- The Unkabogable Praybeyt Benjamin (2011)
- Manila Kingpin: The Asiong Salonga Story (2011)
- Moron 5 and the Crying Lady (2012)
- Shake, Rattle and Roll Fourteen: The Invasion (2012)
- El Presidente (December 25, 2012)
- Ang Maestra (2013)
- Raketeros (2013) Heaven's Best Entertainment & Star Cinema
- Sa Ngalan ng Ama, Ina, at mga Anak (2014) Wason
- Bride for Rent (2014)
- Echosherang Frog (2014)
- Maybe This Time (2014)
- Mariquina (2014)
- Praybeyt Benjamin 2 (2014)
- The Breakup Playlist (2015)
- Fruits N' Vegetables: Mga Bulakboleros (2016) Professor at the Science Lab (U.P. Campus-Diliman)
- Can't Help Falling in Love (2017)
- Sanggano't Sanggago't Sanggwapo (2019)
- Pakboys Takusa (2020)
- Sanggano, Sanggago’t Sanggwapo 2: Aussie! Aussie (O Sige) (2021)

=== Television ===
Year	Title	Role
1990–1991	Love Me Doods	
1990	Mongolian Barbecue	Himself / Guest
1991–1993	Lunch Date	Himself / Host
1993–1995	SST: Salo-Salo Together	Himself / Host
1993–1995	Haybol Rambol	
1993–1994	Tondominium	
1993	Kate en Boogie	Boogie
1996–1997	Ober Da Bakod	
2000	Goin Bayabas	
2001–2004	Whattamen	Yaki
2001–2003	Kool Ka Lang	Gancho
2002–2004	Ispup	
2003–2004	Masayang Tanghali Bayan	Himself / Host
2003	Home Along Da Airport	Paktol
2005	Bora: "Sons of the Beach"	Marlon
2005	Maynila	
2006	Crazy For You	Edgardo
2007	Kemis: Ke Misis Umaasa	
2007	Sabi ni Nanay	
2008	Palos	Luigi
2008	Talentadong Pinoy	Judge
2009	Parekoy	Bart
2009	Maalaala Mo Kaya	
2009	Sharon	Himself / Guest
2010	Showtime	Himself / Guest Judge
2010	Wowowee	Himself / Guest
2010	Kokey @ Ako	Eduardo Reyes
2010	Wansapanataym	
2011	Star Confessions	
2011	Bagets: Just Got Lucky	
2011	Sugo Mga Kapatid	
2011	Maria la del Barrio	Chito Kayanan
2011	Ang Utol Kong Hoodlum	Tiyo Paeng
2011	Angelito: Batang Ama	Fulgencio "Pol" Dela Torre
2012	Wako Wako	Tanyo "Tats"
2012	Toda Max	Brutus
2013	May Isang Pangarap	Restituto "Resty" Francisco
2013	Minute to Win It	Himself / Guest Player
2013	It's Showtime	Himself / Guest Judge
2013	Wansapanataym: OMG (Oh My Genius)	Master Choo
2014	Maalaala Mo Kaya: "Santan"	Pitong
2014	Ikaw Lamang	Roman
2015	2 ½ Daddies	
2015	Kapamilya, Deal or No Deal	Briefcase Number 11
2015	Forevermore	Alex Pante's father
2015–2018	FPJ's Ang Probinsyano	Edgar Guzman
2015	Karelasyon	Ariel
2016	Dear Uge	Tatey
2016–2017	Alyas Robin Hood	Wilson Chan
2016	Usapang Real Love: "Relationship Goals"	Ricky
2017	La Luna Sangre	Berto
2017	Tadhana: "Sundo"	Episode Guest
2018	Precious Hearts Romances Presents Araw Gabi	Alonzo Verano
2018	Funny Ka, Pare Ko	Don Jovi
2018	Ipaglaban Mo: "Ganti"	Marcelo Andres
2018	Dear Uge: "Isang Takong, Isang Sagot"	Toto Salvador
2019	Pepito Manaloto	Carlos Afuang
2019	Magkaagaw	Mark Veloso
2020	Bawal Na Game Show	Himself / Contestant
2022	Maria Clara at Ibarra	Mang Adong
2023–present	Walang Matigas na Pulis sa Matinik na Misis	Police Maj. Vincent Policarpio

=== Microdrama ===
Year	Title	Role
2025	Love Me Doods	Leo Baltazar

=== Radio shows ===
- Eat All You Can
