= Dencio Padilla =

Filipino actor and comedian (1928–1997)

- Born: Esteban Buenvinida Baldivia; September 2, 1928; Nagcarlan, Laguna, Philippines
- Died: October 10, 1997 (aged 69); Quezon City, Philippines
- Other name: Tata Dens
- Occupations: Comedian; Actor
- Years active: 1958–1997
- Spouse: Catalina Domínguez
- Children: 8 (including Dennis Padilla)
- Relatives: Julia Barretto (granddaughter)
- Awards: Best Supporting Actor for "Kahit Konting Pagtingin", FAP Awards 1990

Esteban Buenvinida Baldivia (September 2, 1928 – October 10, 1997), better known as Dencio Padilla or Tata Dens (Tagalog pronunciation: [ˈdɛnʃo paˈdilja]), was a veteran Filipino actor and comedian.

== Career ==
He appeared in films as the favorite sidekick of Fernando Poe Jr. Known for his Batangueño accent when speaking, Padilla also played supporting roles for other Filipino stars, like Ace Vergel, Rudy Fernandez, Phillip Salvador, Vilma Santos, Nora Aunor, Sharon Cuneta, Maricel Soriano and other big stars.

== Political views ==
In 1986, Padilla campaigned for the reelection of president Ferdinand Marcos in the 1986 snap election.

== Personal life ==
He was married to Catalina Dominguez from Mabalacat, Pampanga, a housewife and they had 8 kids; Dennis, Samuel, Glenn, Jennifer, Gene, Richard, Ched, and Rot. They lived their entire life in P.Jacinto Street corner, Biglang Awa and EDSA, Caloocan city. Dennis is also an actor as well as a politician; Samuel is an OFW Seaman; Glenn is OFW in Middle East places such as Kuwait, Jeddah, Riyadh, Dubai, and is presently in the USA; Jennifer is OFW in Dubai; Gene Padilla also a comedian and actor; Richard died in 1999; Ched is OFW in Singapore; and youngest Rot is in Baldivia. The 5 boys were products of Notre Dame of Manila, and the 3 girls of Our Lady of Grace Academy, both in Caloocan city, a walking distance from their home. All 8 attended college in UST/San Sebastián/Centro Escolar/UE. All 8 appeared in movies and commercials during their childhood.

=== Health and death ===
Padilla was rushed to the hospital on September 30, 1997, after complaining of chest pains. About to be checked out from the hospital, Padilla died of cardiac arrest on October 10, 1997, at Quezon City, Philippines. Apart from his son Dennis Padilla who followed his footsteps to become a comedian, Dencio Padilla had other children. He was buried at Nagcarlan Municipal Cemetery in Nagcarlan, Laguna.

== Filmography ==
Year	Title	Role
1963	Ito ang Maynila	
1963	Isputnik vs. Darna	
1965	Ang Daigdig Ko'y Ikaw	Dencio
1968	Alyas 1-2-3	
1976	Iniibig Kita... Father Salvador	
1976	Bato sa Buhangin	Lucio
1982	D' Wild Wild Weng	Mr. Dencio
1982	Cross My Heart	Dexter
1984	Somewhere	Tengteng
1985	Anak ng Tondo	Tata Teban
1985	Tinik sa Dibdib	Bert
1986	Inday, Inday sa Balitaw	Simo
1986	Batang Quiapo	Momoy "Lugaw" David
1986	Captain Barbell	Police chief
1987	My Bugoy Goes to Congress	
1987	No Retreat... No Surrender... Si Kumander	Dennis
1987	Vigilante	Andoy
1987	Kapag Puno Na ang Salop	
1988	Stupid Cupid	Tomas
1988	Kambal Tuko	Mr. Dennis Labis
1988	Damong Makamandag	
1988	One Day, Isang Araw	
1988	Jockey T'yan	
1988	Langit at Lupa	
1988	Agila ng Maynila	
1989	Ako ang Huhusga	
1989	Everlasting Love	
1989	Isang Bala, Isang Buhay	Mang Doming
1990	Kahit Konting Pagtingin	Basilio
1990	Ikasa Mo, Ipuputok Ko!	Lolo Porong
1990	Bikining Itim	Enteng
1991	Humanap Ka ng Panget	Jonathan
1991	Sagad Hanggang Buto	Tiyong Dencio
1991	Hinukay Ko Na ang Libingan Mo	Berting
1991	Pitong Gamol	Mang Kulas
1991	Darna	
1991	Juan Tamad at Mister Shooli: Mongolian Barbecue	Emcee
1992	Eh, Kasi Bata	
1992	Lucio Margallo	Temyong
1993	Ang Boyfriend Kong Gamol	Don Carlo
1994	Nandito Ako	Tata Isko
1994	Ismael Zacarias	Bugaloo
1994	Lucas Abelardo	Inocencio
1994	Baby Paterno: Dugong Pulis	Restaurant Owner
1994	Abrakadabra	Baste
1994	Tatlong Anak, Isang Ama	Tiyo Ebong
1994	Kanto Boy 2: Anak ni Totoy Guapo	Maning
1995	Pustahan Tayo! Mahal Mo Ako!	Tata Pedro
1995	Ikaw Pa... Eh Love Kita!	Karina's Uncle
1995	Minsan Pa: Kahit Konting Pagtingin 2	Basilio
1995	Pempe ni Sara at Pen	The Man in White
1995	Pulis Probinsya 2: Tapusin Na Natin ang Laban!	Priest
1996	Maginoong Barumbado: Kung May Halaga Pa ang Buhay Mo	Tata Temyong
1997	Pablik Enemi 1 n 2: Aksidental Heroes	Sergio's Daddy

=== Film ===
- Lo' Waist Gang at si Og sa Mindoro (1958)
- Laban sa Lahat (1958)
- Sumpa at Pangako (1959)
- Ang Kanyang Kamahalan (1959)
- Tough Guy (1959) Dencio
- Gabi ng Lagim (1960) (segment 2)
- Cuatro Cantos (1960)
- Hong Kong Honeymoon (1960)
- Mga Tigreng Taga-Bukid (1962)
- Batang Maynila (1962)
- Dead or Alive (1962)
- Cuatro Condenados (1962)
- Sigaw ng Digmaan (1963)
- Kung Gabi sa Maynila (1963)
- Ito Ang Maynila (1963)
- Ang Asawa Kong Barat (1963)
- Sierra Madre (1963)
- Baril na Ginto (1964)
- Swanie (1965)
- Dandansoy (1965)
- Ang Daigdig Ko'y Ikaw (1965)
- Guillermo Bravado (1965)
- Zamboanga (1966)
- Ang Iniluluha Ko'y Dugo (1966)
- Alyas Phantom (1966)
- Itinakwil Man Kita (1966)
- Si Siyanang at Ang 7 Tsikiting (1966)
- Dedicate To You (1966)
- Mga Alabok sa Lupa (1967)
- Ex-Convict (1967)
- Like Father, Like Son: Kung Ano Ang Puno Siya Ang Bunga! (1967)
- Langit at Lupa (1967)
- Durango (1967)
- Alamat ng 7 Kilabot (1967)
- To Susan With Love (1968)
- Tatlong Hari (1968)
- Tanging Ikaw (1968)
- Sorrento (1968)
- Magpakailanman (1968)
- Dos Por Dos (1968)
- Zato Duling: The Cross-Eyed Swordsman (1969)
- Our Man Duling (1969)
- Nardong Kutsero (1969)
- Ikaw Ang Lahat Sa Akin (1969)
- Gun-Runners (1969)
- Batang Matadero (1969)
- Tora! Tora! Toray! (1971)
- Liezl At Ang 7 Hoods (1971)
- Family Planting (1971)
- Apat na Patak ng Dugo ni Adan (1971)
- Ang Kampana sa Santa Quiteria (1971)
- Salaginto't Salagubang (1972)
- Bilangguang Puso (1972)
- Karnabal (1973) Badong
- Hanggang Sa Kabila ng Daigdig: The Tony Maiquez Story (1973)
- Ang Agila At Ang Araw (1973)
- Aking Maria Clara (1973)
- Sanctuaryo (1974) FPJ and Dencio
- Dragonfire (1974)
- Batya't Palu-Palo (1974) Takio
- Kaming Matatapang Ang Apog (1975)
- Hit and Run (1975)
- Anino ng Araw (1975)
- Anak ng Araw (1975)
- Ang Leon at Ang Daga (1975) Dencio
- Sapagka't Kami'y Mga Misis Lamang (1976)
- Tutubing Kalabaw Tutubing Karayom (1977)
- Nagbabagang Asero (1977)
- Bontoc (1977)
- Little Christmas Tree (1977)
- Tatak ng Tundo (1978) Damian
- Isang Araw Isang Buhay (1978)
- The Jess Lapid Story (1978)
- Salonga (1978)
- Mahal...Ginagabi Ka Na Naman (1979)
- Holdup: Special Squad, D.B. (1979)
- Dakpin... Killers For Hire (1979)
- Anak ng Atsay (1979)
- Isa Para Sa Lahat, Lahat para Sa Isa (1979)
- Dobol Dribol (1979)
- Mahal, Saan Ka Nanggaling Kagabi? (1979)
- Tatak Angustia (1980) Gudoy
- Kalibre .45 (1980)
- Ang Leon At Ang Kuting (1980)
- Angelita, Ako Ang Iyong Ina (1980) Dennis
- Ang Agila At Ang Falcon (1980)
- Tartan (1981)
- Rocky Tu-log (1981)
- Iskorokotoy (1981)
- Palpak Connection (1981)
- Kamandag ng Rehas ng Bakal (1981)
- Boogie (1981) Boogie
- Juan Balutan (1982)
- Cross My Heart (1982) Dexter
- Bad Boys From Dadiangas (1982)
- Annie Sabungera (1982)
- D'Wild Wild Weng (1982) Mr. Dencio
- Forgive and Forget (1983)
- The Cute The Sexy n' The Tiny (1982)
- Inside Job (1983)
- Aking Prince Charming (1983)
- Idol (1984)
- Somewhere (1984) Tengteng
- Naku Ha! (1984)
- Anak ni Waray vs. Anak ni Biday (1984)
- Julian Vaquero (1984)
- Bagets 2 (1984) Erpat
- Tinik sa Dibdib (1985)
- Nagalit Ang Patay Sa Haba ng Lamay (1985)
- Blue Jeans Gang (1985)
- Anak ng Tondo (1985) Tata Teban
- Public Enemy No. 2: Maraming Number Two (1985) Carlos
- Tatak ng Yakuza (1986)
- Kamagong (1986)
- Inday-Inday Sa Balitaw (1986) Simo
- Batang Quiapo (1986) Momoy "Lugaw" David
- Vigilante (1987)
- Kapag Lumaban ang Api (1987) Nardo
- Boy Tornado (1987) Inggo
- Humanda Ka... Ikaw ang Susunod (1987)
- Leon at Tigre (1989)
- Tatak ng Isang Api (1989)
- Bote, Dyaryo, Garapa (1989)
- Ako ang Huhusga (1989) Sgt. Sibal
- Ipaglalaban Ko (1989)
- Galit Sa Mundo (1989)
- Joe Pring: Homicide Manila Police (1989)
- Hulihin Si, Nardong Toothpick (1990) Mr. Luna
- Dino Dinero (1990)
- Dadaan Ka Sa Ibabaw Ng Aking Bangkay (1990)
- Kahit Konting Pagtingin (1990)
- Biokids (1990)
- Ikasa Mo, Ipuputok Ko (1990)
- Kristobal: Tinik Sa Korona (1990)
- Bikining Itim (1990)
- Samson En Goliath (1990)
- Wooly Booly 2: Ang Titser Kong Alien (1990)
- Lover's Delight (1990) Mr. Padilla
- May Isang Tsuper Ng Taxi (1990)
- Para Sa Iyo Ang Huling Bala Ko (1990)
- Pitong Gamol (1991)
- Mabuting Kaibigan, Masamang Kaaway (1991) Gorio
- Ang Utol Kong Hoodlum (1991)
- Pempe ni Sara at Pen (1992) The Man in White
- Miss Na Miss Kita: Ang Utol Kong Hoodlum II (1992)
- Basagulero (1992)
- Lucio Margallo (1992) Tata Teryong
- Dito sa Pitong Gatang (1992)
- Ali in Wonderland (1992)
- Padre Amante Guerrero (1993) Crispin
- Hulihin: Probinsyanong Mandurukot (1993) Del
- Astig (1993)
- Ang Boyfriend Kong Gamol (1993)
- Ikaw Lang (1993) Ka Erning
- Masahol Pa sa Hayop (1993) Baloy
- Jesus Calderon: Maton (1993)
- Nandito Ako (1993) Tata Isko
- Walang Matigas Na Tinapay Sa Mainit Na Kape (1994)
- Tony Bagyo: Daig Pa Ang Asong Ulol (1994)
- Sobra Talaga ... Over! (1994)
- Tunay na Magkaibigan Walang Iwanan Peksman! (1994) Tata Emilio
- Cuadro De Jack (1994)
- Chickboys (1994)
- Baby Paterno: Dugong Pulis (1994)
- Abrakadabra (1994) Baste
- Ismael Zacarias (1994) Bugaloo
- Kanto Boy 2: Anak ni Totoy Guapo (1995) Maning
- Urban Rangers (1995) Egay
- Minsan Pa: Kahit Konting Pagtingin Part 2 (1995) Basilio
- Ikaw Pa ... Eh Love Kita! (1995) Karina's Uncle
- Pulis Probinsiya 2: Tapusin Natin ang Laban (1995) Father Sanchez
- Dog Tag: Katarungan Sa Aking Kamay (1995) Mang Martin
- SPO1 Don Juan: Da Dancing Policeman (1996) Lolo Tasyo
- Pusong Hiram (1996)
- Makamandag Na Dugo (1996)
- Maginoong Barumbado (1996)
- Ikaw Ang Mahal Ko (1996) Teban
- Ang Syota Kong Balikbayan (1996)
- Totoy Mola (1997) Tatay Pasyo
- Pablik Enemi 1 n 2: Aksidental Heroes (1997)
- Laban Ko Ito: Walang Dapat Madamay (1997) Simon
- Kriselda: Sabik sa Iyo (1997)
- Go Johnny Go (1997)
- Enteng en Mokong: Kaming Mga Mababaw Ang Kaligayahan (1997)
- Ang Maton at ang Showgirl (1998)

=== Television ===
- Eat Bulaga! (1983)
- Tonite With Boots and Dencio (1984-1988)
- Isang Mundo Isang Lahi (1988) as Amado Salazar
- GMA Supershow (1991) Guest
- Ano Ba Siya? The Trip Show (1992-1995)
- TNT: Talak ng Taon (1995) as Main Host
- ASAP (1996) as Singer Performer
- Afternoon Overload Saya (1997) Last TV Appearance before his death.

== Awards and nominations ==
Year	Award	Category	Work	Result
1964	FAMAS 1963	Best Supporting Actor	Ito ang Maynila	Nominated
1984	FAMAS 1984	Best Supporting Actor	Tatak ng Yakuza	Nominated
1991	FAP 1991	Best Supporting Actor	Kahit Konting Pagtingin	Won
