= Extranghero =

- Official movie poster
- Directed by: Ben Feleo
- Written by: Ben Feleo; Ana Santos; Reynaldo Castro
- Produced by: William Leary
- Starring: Andrew E.; Michelle Aldana; Jorge Estregan
- Cinematography: Ernie dela Paz
- Edited by: Rene Tala
- Music by: Andrew Espiritu
- Production company: Viva Films
- Release date: December 12, 1997
- Running time: 106 minutes
- Country: Philippines
- Language: Filipino

Extranghero is a superhero comedy film co-written and directed by Ben Feleo and starring Andrew E., Michelle Aldana, and Jorge Estregan. Produced by Viva Films, it was released on December 12, 1997.

== Plot ==
Botong and his father leave their province to find a decent livelihood in Manila. Botong unknowingly tags along with a group of robbers who offer him a "job". The group breaks into a house and attempts to molest a sleeping woman. Botong recognizes the woman whose name is Kristy, realizes the ill intent of the robbers and stops them. The robbers are arrested by the police. Kristy convinces her mother, Doña Isabel, to let Botong stay in their house. He then works at their house as a househelp.

Botong helps Kristy prepare for a party and the two start to develop feelings for each other. The two dance in the party. Kristy's fiancé, Ivan arrives late and sees them dancing. Irritated, he insults Botong and kicks him out of the party. Kristy's mother notices her daughter's feelings for Botong and pleads Kristy to not commit the same mistake as she did. Ivan shortly proposes to Kristy to marry him. Kristy rejects Ivan and Botong who is nearby sides with her. This ensues a fight which leads to Kristy's mother and Kristy herself to evict him for his own good. Ivan also leaves heartbroken.

Two meteors from space strike Earth. One hits Ivan while driving a car and another hits Botong. Botong goes to space due to the collision, where he talks to a celestial entity which says he will give him a "better role" beyond "being a protagonist". Botong is then sent back to Earth and finds out that he gained superpowers. He helps stop thugs and is called in the press as "Extranghero" for being an "extra" in one of his exploits. Meanwhile, Ivan, after being trapped in his burning car, extricates himself and burns a reporter covering his accident to death. His bodyguards and secretary Espertina pledge their loyalty to Ivan.

Botong and his dad end up in jail and meet the robbers Botong encountered earlier. With his powers, Botong and his father escape. The two apply for a job as a messenger and maintenance employee, with Botong using his powers to help them get hired. Botong continues to explore his powers helping others while not in costume.

Ivan uses his powers for evil with the help of his goons. Donning a costume, he introduces himself as a supervillain to the media. Ivan orders his minions to kidnap Kristy. Kristy successfully flees but is stuck in a railroad as a train approaches, only to be saved by Extranghero. Ivan then kidnaps Kristy himself and keeps her in a warehouse. Ivan then promises to Kristy that she will become his queen and have a family and they will rule the world. Kristy rejects Ivan again and Espertina objects saying Ivan promised the same to her. He reminds her that she pledged to follow his every wish. Ivan then kisses Kristy against her wishes.

Extranghero arrives and fights Ivan. Ivan entrusts Kristy to Espertina and the two women fight as well. Kristy manages to escape Espertina's custody which leads to Ivan giving Espertina some superhuman abilities. Espertina overpowers Kristy and pushes her from a platform which kills her. Extranghero is devastated while holding Kristy in his arms. Electricity appears in his hands which Extranghero uses to revive Kristy. This also gives her temporary powers so she can continue her fight with Espertina. Extranghero continues his fight with Ivan and throws a large flammable container, seemingly killing Ivan and causing an explosion.

Extranghero flies out with Kristy and leaves her with her mother. Botong arrives, feigning jealousy to his superpowered alter ego. Kristy confess and they attempt to kiss but are stopped by her mother. Botong's father arrives and tells his son that their boss is looking for them. Doña Isabel recognizes Botong's father as her husband meaning that Botong and Kristy are siblings. However Isabel disclosed that she adopted Kristy due to her separation with her long lost son meaning that the two could indeed be together.

Ivan appears, still alive, to everyone's surprise.

== Cast ==
- Andrew E. as Extranghero/Botong
- Michelle Aldana as Kristy
- Jorge Estregan as Ivan
- Julie Lorette as Espertina
- Zeny Zabala as Doña Isabel
- Joji Isla as Cadio
- Blakdyak

== Music ==
Filipino-Chinese rapper group, Chinese Mafia did the title soundtrack of Extranghero, "Kapangyarihan".
