= Andrew E. =

Filipino rapper, record producer and actor (born 1967)

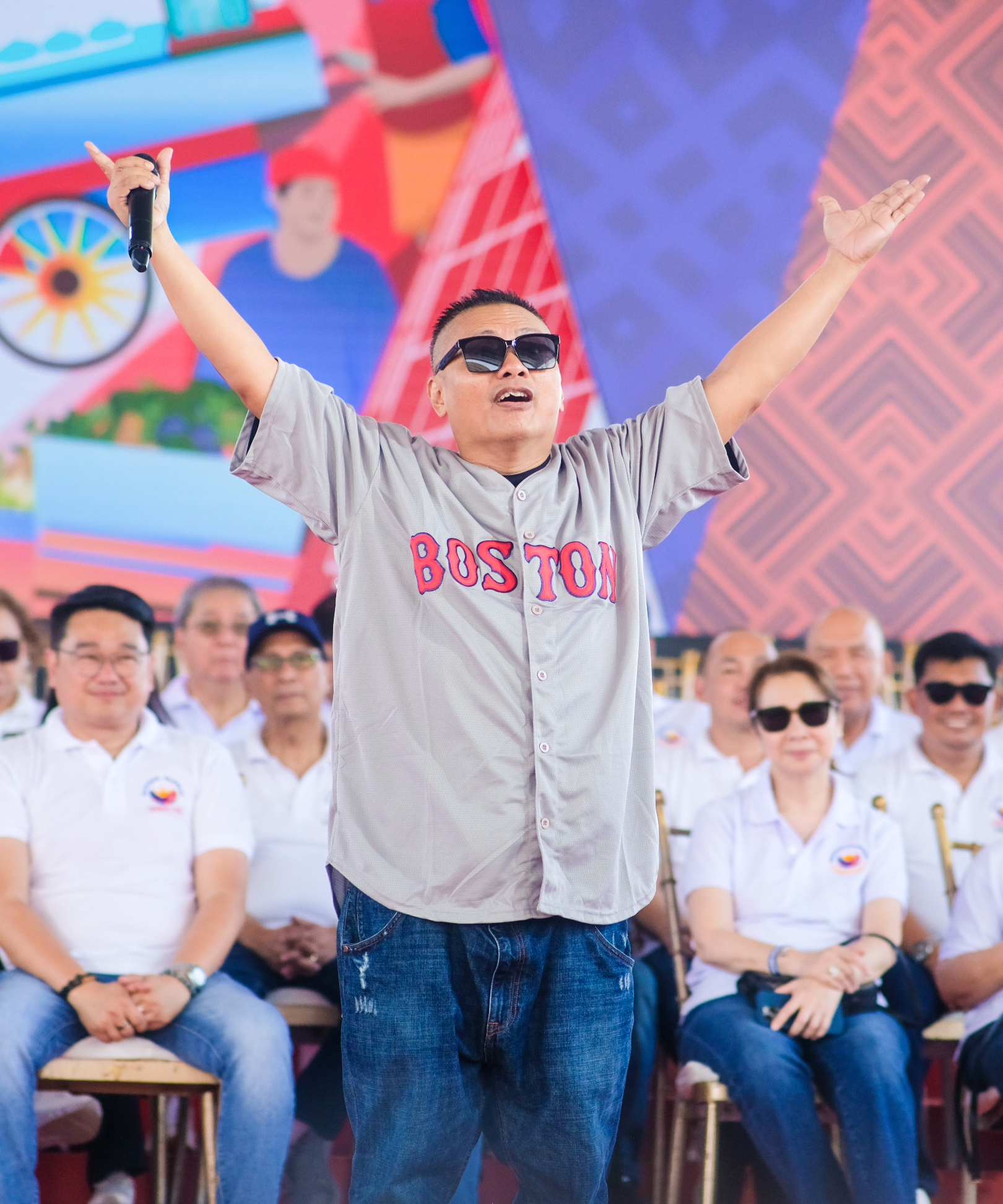
- Espiritu at the 2024 Bagong Pilipinas Serbisyo Fair in General Trias, Cavite

Background information
- Also known as: Gamol, Kuya Andrew, King of Tagalog Rap
- Born: Andrew Ford Valentino Espiritu; July 30, 1967 (age 59); Naga, Camarines Sur, Philippines
- Origin: Parañaque, Philippines
- Genres: Pinoy hip hop; pop-rap; dirty rap; comedy rap
- Occupations: Rapper; actor
- Years active: 1985–present
- Labels: Dongalo Wreckords; Viva

Andrew Ford Valentino Espiritu (born July 30, 1967), known professionally as Andrew E., is a Filipino rapper and actor. He is best known in the Philippines for his 1990 debut hit single "Humanap Ka ng Panget" ("Find an Ugly Person"). Andrew E. won a Rap Album of the Year award for his album Clubzilla at the 2010 PMPC Star Awards for Music. His single "Shoot Shoot Part 2" was later used as an instrumental for the campaign jingle "Heto Na Inday Sara".

== Career ==
Espiritu first worked as a DJ in the popular club, Euphoria, and was discovered by entrepreneur and musician Ramon "RJ" Jacinto in 1990. He made his television debut on That's Entertainment, a variety show hosted by the late German Moreno on GMA-7. He eventually started his professional career in December 1990 when he released his debut single "Humanap Ka ng Panget" (transl. Find Someone Who Is Ugly).

In mid-1997, Espiritu founded an independent rap label named Dongalo Wreckords for the purpose of discovering and producing new rap talents, one of them being the rap group Salbakuta, with their debut single "S2upid Luv" becoming a best-seller and spawning a theatrical feature film starring Espiritu.

Espiritu spent some time in Japan in the late 1990s, performing in clubs and eventually releasing a CD single with two rap songs in Japanese about the misadventures of a tourist in Tokyo. This got the attention of a Japanese producer, who offered to help promote him if he would apply for Japanese citizenship.

In 2000, he was a consultant to Caloocan mayor Rey Malonzo "for entertainment and cultural affairs".

On March 25, 2002, he released the album Porno Daw.

In 2010, he was one of the judges in ABS-CBN's noontime variety/talent show Showtime. He later returned as a judge in the Showtime segment "Hype Best".

He has collaborated with Sharon Cuneta, Willie Revillame, Joey de Leon, Regine Velasquez, Francis M., Ogie Alcasid, Janno Gibbs, Carlos Agassi, Death Threat, Salbakuta, DJs such as DJ Coki of Wil Time Big Time, DJ MOD of Showtime and DJ Belal of New York, and actresses such as Maricel Soriano, Ana Roces, Nanette Medved, Charlene Gonzalez, Vina Morales, Sheryl Cruz, Gelli de Belen, Alice Dixson, Amanda Page, Rufa Mae Quinto, Donita Rose and Rica Peralejo.

Espiritu returned to acting in 2016 as Uge, the biological father of Serena (played by Liza Soberano) in ABS-CBN's drama series Dolce Amore.

Andrew's first Star Cinema movie was "Raketeros", a comedy movie was released in 2013 for the film company's 20th anniversary of Star Cinema and ABS-CBN Film Productions.

Andrew starred alongside Dennis Padilla, Janno Gibbs, Louise Delos Reyes and Eddie Garcia in the comedy film Sanggano, Sanggago't Sanggwapo, his first feature with Viva Films since A.B. Normal College in 2003. Sanggano, Sanggago't Sanggwapo was released in theaters in September 2019.

On December 11, 2024, Andrew held his first ever solo concert, titled Time for your mind concert at the New Frontier Theater, Quezon City. This was the rapper first major concert in his 34 years in music industry.

=== Allegations of plagiarism from foreign songs ===
In 2018, Espiritu became involved in a plagiarism controversy when "Humanap Ka ng Panget" was accused of being an unauthorized translation of the song "Find an Ugly Woman" by DJ Cash Money and MC Marvelous. A thread in the /r/Philippines subreddit called out the rapper for allegedly making a cover of "Find An Ugly Woman" without Cash Money Marvelous' permission, just after the noontime variety show ASAP aired a tribute performance to Espiritu. The track "Alabang Girls" was taken from the Led Zeppelin song "Black Dog", where its band guitarist Jimmy Page guest on a show of The Tonight Show Starring Jimmy Fallon as he stated "If someone had taken my riffs without acknowledgment or payment, it would have been deemed theft. The same standard must apply to AI". The song chorus for the track "Banyo Queen" was heavily interpolated from Ben E. King song "Stand By Me".

== Personal life ==
Espiritu married Mylene Espiritu in March 2000. The couple have three children.

== Filmography ==
=== Film ===
| Year | Title | Role | Ref. |
|---|---|---|---|
| 1990 | Humanap Ka ng Panget | Andy | |
| 1991 | Pitong Gamol | Ambong | |
| 1991 | Andrew Ford Medina: Huwag Kang Gamol | Andrew Ford Medina | |
| 1992 | Alabang Girls | Unat/Straight | |
| 1992 | Mahirap Maging Pogi | Parding Pogi | |
| 1992 | Pretty Boy | Pretty Boy/Cute | |
| 1993 | Manchichiritchit | Isko | |
| 1993 | Gagay: Prinsesa ng Brownout | cameo appearance as himself | |
| 1993 | Ang Boyfriend Kong Gamol | Tom Cruz | |
| 1993 | Row 4: Ang Baliktorians | Agapito "Aguy" Santos | |
| 1994 | Pinagbiyak Na Bunga: Lookalayk | Urot/Blacky | |
| 1994 | Megamol | Clark "Uragon" Bokol | |
| 1994 | Ikaw ang Miss Universe ng Buhay Ko | Robin | |
| 1995 | Bikini Watch | Kiko | |
| 1995 | P're Hanggang Sa Huli | Cooper Guerrero | |
| 1995 | Bangers | Hap Hibang | |
| 1996 | Neber 2-Geder | Bert Control | |
| 1996 | Where 'D' Girls 'R' | Andong | |
| 1997 | Si Mokong, si Astig, at si Gamol | Gamol | |
| 1997 | Roberta | Special Participation (Andrew E.'s 1st Drama Movie) | |
| 1997 | Matinik Na Bading, Mga Syukeng Nuking | Tirso/Tricia | |
| 1997 | Extranghero | Botong | |
| 1997 | Strict ang Parents Ko | Jr. Ramos | |
| 2000 | Markova: Comfort Gay | Chiquito/Tintoy on the film set | |
| 2000 | Mana-Mana Tiba-Tiba | Wilson | |
| 2001 | Tusong Twosome | Bano | |
| 2001 | Banyo Queen | Drew | |
| 2002 | Burles King Daw, O! | Troy | |
| 2002 | D' Uragons: Never Umuurong Always Sumusulong | Orot | |
| 2002 | S2pid Luv | George | |
| 2003 | A.B. Normal College: Todo Na 'Yan! Kulang Pa 'Yun! | Andres | |
| 2013 | Raketeros | Andoy | |
| 2019 | Sanggano, Sanggago't Sanggwapo | Andy | |
| 2020 | Pakboys Takusa | John | |
| 2021 | Sanggano, Sanggago’t Sanggwapo 2: Aussie! Aussie (O Sige) | Andy | |
| 2021 | Mang Jose | Mount Apolinario | |
| 2021 | Shoot Shoot | Jack | |

=== Television ===
| Year | Title | Role | Ref. |
|---|---|---|---|
| 2000 | Crayon Shin-chan | Shinnosuke Nohara (voice; Tagalog translation) | |
| 2009 | Midnight DJ | Himself ("Gayuma ng Panget") | |
| 2012-2013 | Kapitan Awesome | Adonis | |
| 2016 | Dolce Amore | Uge, Serena's father | |
| 2017–2022 | I Can See Your Voice | Himself / Sing-vestigators | |
| 2026 | That’s Nutz! | Himself / Host | |

== Discography ==
=== Singles ===
- 1990 - "Humanap Ka ng Panget"
- 1990 - "Ize Ba Tayo Dyan?"
- 1990 - "Wag Kang Gamol"
- 1991 - "Mas Gusto Mo Siya"
- 1991 - "Mahal Kita"
- 1991 - "Bini B. Rocha"
- 1991 - "Andrew Ford Medina"
- 1992 - "Mahirap Maging Pogi"
- 1992 - "Alabang Girls"
- 1993 - "Manchichiritchit"
- 1994 - "Ang Boyfriend Kong Gamol" (featuring Alice Dixson)
- 1994 - "Ikaw ang Miss Universe ng Buhay Ko"
- 1995 - "Akala Ko" (duet with Sharon Cuneta)
- 1995 - "Bikini Watch"
- 1995 - "Hibangers"
- 1996 - "Neber-2-Geder"
- 1997 - "Where the Girls Are"
- 1999 - "Maggy"
- 1999 - "Banyo Queen"
- 1999 - "Rubber Dickey"
- 1999 - "Fax Me"
- 2000 - "ShaNaNaNaNa"
- 2000 - "Honey"
- 2000 - "Kagat ng Aso" (Dog bite)
- 2001 - "Sinabmarin"
- 2004 - "Shoot Shoot"
- 2004 - "Pink Palaka"
- 2004 - "That's Why I Love You" (with Regine Velasquez)
- 2005 - "My Banyo Queen"
- 2005 - "Ako ay Bano"
- 2006 - "Clean"
- 2008 - "Ikaw" (Humanap Ka ng Panget Part 2)
- 2010 - "Sophisitkado" (PMPC Winner/Rap Album of the Year)
- 2010 - "Danz Now" (feat. Bugoy na Koykoy and Anne Jameo)
- 2010 - "A.N.D.R.E.W.F.O.R.D"
- 2010 - "Clubzilla"
- 2010 - "Stand Alone"
- 2012 - "Classmate" (feat. Winhope)
- 2013 - "Ayokong Magtiis Ka"
- 2013 - "I Wish I Can" (feat.Bastee)
- 2016 - "Neng, Ikaw Ba Yan?" (feat. Damuho Skwad)
- 2020 - "Huwag Kang Gamol" (2020 Remix)
- 2020 - "Tamang-tama"
- 2021 - "Shoot-Shoot" (Part 2)
- 2024 - "Para sa Streets"

=== Soundtracks ===
- Humanap Ka Ng Panget The Official Movie Soundtrack (Viva Records, 1991)
- Pretty Boy Soundtrack (Viva Records, 1991)
- Pitong Gamol The Soundtrack (Viva Records, 1992)
- Mahirap Maging Pogi The Soundtrack (Viva Records, 1992)
- Andrew Ford Medina The Soundtrack (Viva Records, 1992)
- Alabang Girls The Official Movie Soundtrack (Viva Records, 1992)
- Manchirichit The Official Soundtrack (Viva Records, 1993)
- Ober Da Bakod The Movie Soundtrack (Viva Records, 1994)
- Ang Boyfriend Kong Gamol The Soundtrack (Viva Records, 1994)
- Ikaw Ang Miss Universe Ng Buhay Ko Movie Soundtrack (Viva Records, 1994)
- MeGamol The Soundtrack (Viva Records, 1995)
- Bangers The Official Movie Soundtrack (Viva Records, 1995)
- Neber 2 Geder The Official Soundtrack Album (Viva Records, 1996)
- Where Da Girls R The Soundtrack (Viva Records, 1997)
- Extranghero The Official Soundtrack Album (Neo Records, 1997)
- Si Mokong, Si Astig At Si Gamol The Soundtrack Album (Viva Records, 1998)
- Banyo Queen The Soundtrack (Viva Records, 1999)
- Mana Mana Tiba Tiba The Soundtrack (Viva Records, 2000)
- D Uragons The Soundtrack (Viva Records, 2001)
- Twosong Twosome The Soundtrack (Viva Records, 2002)
- AB Normal College The Soundtrack (Viva Records, 2003)
- Shoot Shoot The Movie Soundtrack (Viva Records, 2023)

== Awards and nominations ==
| Year | Award giving body | Category | Nominated work | Results |
|---|---|---|---|---|
| 2008 | Awit Awards | Best Novelty Recording | "Cowboy - Cowgirl" | Nominated |
| 2008 | MYX Music Awards | Favorite Urban Video | "Ikaw (Humanap Ka Ng Pangit Part 2)" | Nominated |
| 2010 | 2nd PMPC Star Awards for Music | Rap Album of the Year | "Clubzilla" | Won |
