= Ana Roces =

Filipino actress

- Born: Marinella Adad; February 2, 1976 (age 50); Metro Manila, Philippines
- Occupations: Actress, movies and television series
- Years active: 1988–present
- Agents: GMA Network ABS-CBN; TV5
- Spouse: Trandy Baterina
- Children: 2

Marinella Adad (born February 2, 1976), better known as Ana Roces, is a Filipino actress. Roces was formerly a teen idol in the 1990s and a cast member of That's Entertainment.

== Career ==
She was discovered in the Colgate commercial she appeared in opposite Eric Banes in the 1980s. Her first television appearance was in the Manilyn Reynes starer telenovela Gintong Kristal on GMA-7. Then she became a member of That's Entertainment, Tuesday Group.

She became a Regal contract artist and then transferred to Viva Films where she did over 20 movies. She starred in the 1992 comedy film Alabang Girls with Andrew E. She also starred in the film Oo Na, Sige Na (1994) as the partner of Robin Padilla's character and Kadenang Bulaklak (1993).

== Personal life ==
Roces is the youngest child and only daughter (after two brothers) of Rene Adad, who was the Philippine branch manager of the Coca-Cola Export Company and a former president of the Philippine Football Federation, and Carmina Gutierrez-Adad. Roces is of Lebanese and Spanish descent.

Ana Roces has two children, Carmela and Mateo, and is married to Bertrand "Trandy" Baterina.

== Filmography ==
=== Film ===
- Regal Shocker: The Movie (1989)
- Katabi Ko'y Mamaw (1990)
- Lessons in Love (1990)
- I Have 3 Eggs (1990)
- Shake, Rattle & Roll II (1990)
- Small and Terrible (1991)
- Miss Na Miss Kita (Utol Kong Hoodlum II) (1992)
- Si Lucio at si Miguel: Hihintayin Kayo sa Langit (1992)
- Pretty Boy (1992)
- Alabang Girls (1992)
- Mahirap Maging Pogi (1992)
- Kadenang Bulaklak (1993)
- Ikaw (1993)
- Abel Morado: Ikaw ang May Sala (1993)
- Mistah (1994)
- Oo Na Sige Na (1994)
- Abrakadabra (1994)
- Matimbang Pa sa Dugo (1995)
- Bangers (1995)
- Tiyanaks (2007)
- For the First Time (2008) – Abby Villaraza
- Beauty in a Bottle (2014) – Joy Madamba
- Angela Markado (2015) – Sylvia
- How to Be Yours (2016) – Anj's sister
- The Girl in the Orange Dress (2018) – Nikki Villegas
- Pakboys Takusa (2020)
- Sunny (2024) – Sue

=== Television ===
Year	Title	Role
1988–1990	That's Entertainment	Herself / Host at the Tuesday group
1989	Eat Bulaga!	Herself / Performer during the show's 10th Anniversary Special that happened at the Araneta Coliseum.
1999	Beh Bote Nga	Maan
2006	Calla Lily	Sari
2006	Komiks Presents: Da Adventures of Pedro Penduko	Guest
2006	Makita Ka Lang Muli	Supporting role
2007	Impostora	Alexis Alvarado
2008	E.S.P: The Haunt for a Ghost	Guest
2008	Lovebook Presents: Break-up Diaries	Carla
2008	Codename: Asero	Ellen
2009	Your Song: Boystown	Glenda Santillian
2012	Alice Bungisngis and her Wonder Walis	Matilda Asuncion
2012	Maalaala Mo Kaya: Flash Cards	Guest
2012	A Beautiful Affair	Natalia Saavedra
2013	Wansapanataym: Kilalang Kilala Ka Ba Niya?	Kathy
2013	Wansapanataym: Flores De Yayo	Flor
2013	Anna Karenina	Daisy Manahan
2014	The Singing Bee	Herself
2014	Luv U	Jennifer Sevillamayor
2014	Maalaala Mo Kaya: Nurse Cap	Senior Nurse
2015	Once Upon a Kiss	Daisy
2015–2016	FPJ's Ang Probinsyano	Nora Montano-Guzman
2016	Maalaala Mo Kaya: Mikropono	Annie
2017	Ikaw Lang ang Iibigin	Sandra Reyes-Chan
2018	Precious Hearts Romances Presents: Araw Gabi	Harriet De Alegre
2018	Stories for the Soul: Tenement	Diday
2018	Pamilya Roces	Lily Renacia
2019	Ipaglaban Mo: Paasa	Myla Serafin
2019	Sahaya	Irene Alvarez-Maglayao
2022	Tadhana: Heredera	Marietta

== See also ==
- Viva Films
- Arab settlement in the Philippines
