= Pogi (disambiguation) =

Tadej Pogačar, nicknamed Pogi, is a Slovenian cyclist (born 1998).

Pogi may also refer to:

== People ==
- Carmelo Lazatin Jr., also known as Pogi Lazatin, Filipino politician (born 1969)

== Films ==
- Alyas Pogi (film series), a Filipino action film series
- Alyas Pogi: Birador ng Nueva Ecija, a 1990 Filipino action film
- Alyas Pogi 2, a 1992 Filipino action film, sequel to Alyas Pogi: Birador ng Nueva Ecija
- Alyas Pogi: Ang Pagbabalik, a 1999 Filipino action film, sequel to Alyas Pogi 2
- D' Kilabots Pogi Brothers Weh?!, a 2012 Filipino comedy film
- Mahirap Maging Pogi, a 1992 Filipino comedy film
- Papa Pogi, a 2019 Filipino fantasy comedy film

== Other uses ==
- Typhoon Maemi, known in the Philippines as Super Typhoon Pogi, a Pacific typhoon in 2003
- Mr. Satan, a character from Dragon Ball, known in the Philippines as Master Pogi
- Pogi Years Old, a 2016 album by Parokya ni Edgar
