= Joseph Estrada filmography =

Joseph Estrada
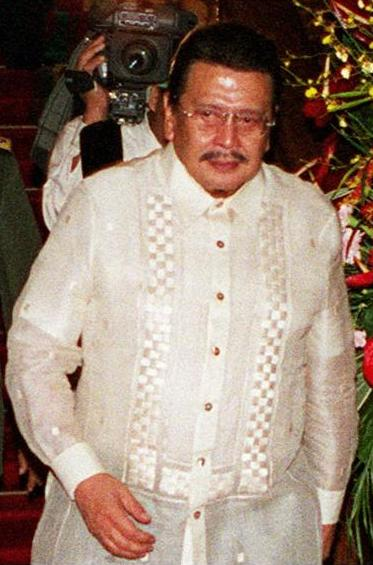
- President Joseph Estrada in 2000.
- Born: Jose Marcelo Ejercito; April 19, 1937 (age 88); Tondo, Manila, Philippines
- Occupations: Actor, President of the Philippines, Mayor of Manila
- Years active: 1956–1989; 2009–present
- Spouse: Luisa Pimentel

This is the filmography of Joseph "Erap" Estrada, a Filipino former actor and 13th President of the Philippines. His film career spans 33 years, from 1956 to 1989. He played the lead role in more than 100 films, and was producer of over 70 films. He was the first FAMAS Hall of Fame awardee for Best Actor (1981) and also became a Hall of Fame award-winner as a producer (1983).

He often played heroes of the downtrodden classes, which gained him the admiration of a lot of the nation's many unschooled and impoverished citizens. This later proved advantageous to his political career. In 1974, he founded the Movie Workers Welfare Foundation (Mowelfund) which helps movie makers through medical reimbursements, hospitalization, surgery and death benefits, livelihood, and alternative income opportunities and housing. Its educational arm, the Mowelfund Film Institute, has produced some of the most skilled and respected producers, filmmakers, writers and performers in both the independent and mainstream sectors of the industry since its inception in 1979. He also founded, together with Dr. Guillermo De Vega, the first Metro Manila Film Festival in 1975. Erap returned to the big screen in 2009 in Ang Tanging Pamilya (A Marry-Go-Round!), his comeback movie after a 20-year hiatus.

== Filmography ==
=== Film ===
Year	Title	Role	Notes	Ref(s).
1957	₱10,000 Pag-Ibig	Fred	Credited as Jose Ejercito	
1957	Kandilang Bakal			
1958	Matandang Tinale		First credit as Joseph Estrada	
1958	Mga Liham Kay Tiya Dely			
1958	Batas ng Puso			
1959	Sumpa at Pangako			
1960	True Confessions			
1960	Cuatro Cantos			
1961	Sa Baril Mag-Uusap			
1961	Pantalan ng Trece			
1961	Nag-uumpugang Bato			
1961	The Moises Padilla Story	The Killer		
1961	Baril sa Baril	Ricardo Guerrero		
1961	Asiong Salonga	Nicasio "Asiong" Salonga		
1962	Tondo Boy			
1962	Markang Rehas			
1962	Kapit sa Patalim			
1962	Hari ng Mga Maton			
1962	Digmaan ng Mga Maton			
1962	Asiong Meets Alembong	Asiong		
1963	Via Europa			
1963	Tres Kantos			
1963	Talahib			
1963	Sugapa			
1963	Pulong Diablo			
1963	Patapon			
1963	Los Paliqueros			
1963	Kung Hindi Ka Susuko			
1963	Kilabot sa Daang Bakal			
1963	Ito ang Maynila			
1963	Istambay			
1963	Ginoong Itim			
1963	Basagulero			
1963	Barilan sa Pugad Lawin			
1964	Vendetta Brothers			
1964	Takot Mabuhay, Takot Mamatay			
1964	Siyam Na Buhay ni Martin Pusa			
1964	Panginoon ng Pantalan			
1964	Pambato			
1964	Geron Busabos: Ang Batang Quiapo	Geron Busabos	Titled Gerry the Tramp in the United States	
1964	Encuentro			
1964	Deadly Brothers			
1964	Mga Daliring Ginto			
1964	Cordillera			
1964	Berdugo ng Mga Maton			
1964	Ako ang Papatay			
1964	Flight to Fury	Garuda		
1965	Valentin Galit			
1965	Sapang Palay			
1965	Salonga Brothers	Asiong Salonga		
1965	Sa Kamay ng Mga Kilabot			
1965	Pepeng Pingas			
1965	Paalam sa Kahapon			
1965	Maskulado			
1965	Labanang Lalake			
1965	Jose Nazareno, ang Taxi Driver			
1965	Hamon sa Bandila			
1965	Hahamakin ang Lahat			
1965	Deadly Pinoy			
1965	Buhay sa Buhay			
1965	Big Boss			
1965	Batang Angustia			
1966	Totoy Bingi			
1966	Stowaway			
1966	Soliman Brothers			
1966	John Doe			
1966	Ito ang Pilipino	Tomas Ronquillo		
1966	Dodong Tricycle			
1966	Bodyguard			
1966	Batang Iwahig			
1966	Bantay Salakay			
1966	Badong Baldado			
1966	Ako'y Magbabalik			
1967	Boy Aguila			
1967	Angkan ng Haragan			
1967	Alex Big Shot			
1968	Valiente Brothers			
1968	Tatlong Hari			
1968	Tatak: Double Cross			
1968	Suntok o Karate			
1968	Rancho Diablo			
1968	Quintin Salazar			
1968	Killer Patrol			
1968	Kid Brother			
1968	Jakiri Valiente			
1968	Galo Gimbal			
1968	Dos Por Dos			
1968	Diegong Daga			
1968	De Colores			
1968	Cuadro de Jack			
1968	Azero Brothers			
1968	Abdul Tapang			
1969	Sagupaan	Asiong Sugod		
1969	Patria Adorada			
1969	Ang Ninong Kong Nazareno			
1969	Capitan Pepe			
1969	Aragon Brothers			
1969	Anim ang Dapat Patayin			
1969	Alamat ng Pitong Kilabot			
1970	Suicide Commandos			
1970	Simon Bastardo			
1970	Sebastian			
1970	Padre Pugante			
1970	Boss Areglado			
1971	Hukom Bitay			
1971	Valentin Walis	Valentin		
1971	Digmaan ng Mga Angkan			
1971	Apat Na Patak ng Dugo ni Adan			
1972	Tatay Na si Erap			
1972	Magiting at Pusakal	Joe Ronquillo		
1972	Kill the Pushers			
1972	Blood Compact			
1973	Panic!	Joe Guerrero		
1973	Okey Ka, Erap!			
1973	Erap Is My Guy			
1973	Dragnet			
1973	Ang Agila at ang Araw			
1974	Tama Na, Erap!			
1974	Ransom			
1974	Manila Connection			
1974	King Khayam and I			
1975	Ang Nobya Kong Sexy			
1975	Huwag Mo Akong Paandaran			
1975	Hit and Run			
1975	Dugo at Pag-ibig sa Kapirasong Lupa			
1975	Diligin Mo ng Hamog ang Uhaw na Lupa			
1975	Counter Kill			
1975	Battle of the Champions			
1976	Hoy Mister, Ako ang Misis Mo!			
1976	Bago Lumamig ang Sabaw			
1976	Arrest the Nurse Killer			
1976	Alas Singko ng Hapon, Gising Na ang Mga Anghel			
1977	Sa Dulo ng Kris			
1977	Huwag Mong Dungisan ang Pisngi ng Langit			
1977	Bakya Mo Neneng			
1978	Yakuza Contract			
1978	Tatak ng Tundo	Jose "Pepe" Sanchez		
1978	Magkaaway			
1978	Mga Mata ni Angelita			
1979	Warrant of Arrest			
1979	Mamang Sorbetero			
1979	Okey Lang, Basta't Kapiling Kita			
1980	Hoy Tukso, Layuan Mo Ako!			
1981	Kumander Alibasbas	Cesareo Manarang		
1982	Pedring Taruc			
1983	Machonurin			
1984	Bangkang Papel sa Dagat ng Apoy	Corpuz		
1985	Order to Kill			
1989	Sa Kuko ng Agila	Tonyo		
1990	May Isang Tsuper ng Taxi	(special participation)		
1995	The Four Stooges	(special participation)		
2007	Talk Toons	Guest		
2009	Ang Tanging Pamilya: A Marry Go Round	Dindo Sicat		
