= Al Tantay =

Filipino actor and director

- Born: Alfredo Tantay; March 15, 1957 (age 69); Manila, Philippines
- Occupations: Actor, comedian, director, writer
- Years active: 1979–present
- Spouse: Rio Locsin

Alfredo Tantay (born March 15, 1957), professionally known as Al Tantay, is a Filipino actor, comedian, writer, and director. He was discovered by Joey Gosiengfiao and was launched through the Regal Films movie, Iskandalo, starring Lorna Tolentino in July 1979. In 1987, he played his first villain role to Rudy Fernandez in the action film Humanda Ka, Ikaw Ang Susunod.

On television, Tantay became a regular actor in the sitcom, Duplex playing neighbor to Ading Fernando and Marissa Delgado. He also joined the Goin' Bananas group with Christopher de Leon, Jay Ilagan, Johnny Delgado and Edgar Mortiz.

When he did VH Films' Gamitin Mo Ako in 1985 under National Artist Ishmael Bernal and sharing stellar billing with Rita Gomez and newbie Stella "Pinky" Suarez, he fell in love with the former.

As a film director, he has directed several comedy films such as Mana-Mana, Tiba-Tiba, S2pid Love and A.B. Normal College.

== Filmography ==
=== As director ===
Year	Title
1994–1999	Tropang Trumpo
2000	Mana-mana, tiba-tiba
2000	Juan & Ted: Wanted
2001	Baliktaran: Si Ace at si Daisy
2001	Banyo Queen
2001	Sanggano't Sanggago
2001	Kool Ka Lang
2002	S2pid Luv
2003	A.B. Normal College: Todo Na 'Yan! Kulang Pa 'Yun!
2008–2013	Lokomoko
2011	Sugo Mga Kapatid
2019	Sanggano, Sanggago’t Sanggwapo
2020	Pakboys Takusa
2021	Sanggano, Sanggago’t Sanggwapo 2: Aussie! Aussie (O Sige)
2021	Shoot Shoot

=== Film ===
Year	Title	Role	Notes
1979	Mang Kepweng		
1980	Girlfriend		
1981	Bilibid Gays		
1985	Hinugot sa Langit	Gerry	
1992	Patayin si Billy Zapanta – Order of Battle: Enemy No. 1		
1992	Shake, Rattle & Roll IV	Architect Rod Mallari	Segment "Ang Kapitbahay"
1993	Wanted: Bata-Batuta		
1993	Kung Ako'y Iiwan Mo		
1993	Pido Dida 3: May Kambal Na		
1993	Makati Ave.: Office Girls	Leo Bautista	
1993	Teen-age Mama		
1995	Batang-X	Dr. Dinero	
1995	Asero	Bugoy	
2003	A.B. Normal College: Todo Na 'Yan! Kulang Pa 'Yun!	Mrs. Salazar's driver	
2003	Masamang Ugat	Ismael Valdez	
2005	Sablay Ka Na... Pasaway Ka Pa...	Don Ruben	
2005	Hari ng Sablay: Isang Tama, Sampung Mali	Benjou	
2007	One More Chance	Tito Willie	
2008	A Very Special Love	Tomas Magtalas	
2009	You Changed My Life	Tomas Magtalas	
2010	The Red Shoes	Benigno Aquino Sr.	
2012	My Kontrabida Girl	Mr. Delmundo	
2012	Born to Love You	Mario Liwanag	
2013	Seduction	Lucas	
2013	It Takes a Man and a Woman	Tomas Magtalas	
2014	The Amazing Praybeyt Benjamin	Benjamin "Ben" Santos VII	
2015	The Love Affair	Pancho Valiente	
2015	No Boyfriend Since Birth	Celso	
2015	A Second Chance	Tito Willie	
2016	This Time	Aldo Buhay	
2016	The Third Party	Mr. Labrador	
2017	Trip Ubusan: The Lolas vs. Zombies	General Valdez (Checkpoint officer)	
2018	Ang Pambansang Third Wheel	Pops	
2018	I Love You, Hater	Oxo Macaraeg	
2021	A Hard Day	The Chief	
2022	Partners in Crime	Bert Cayanan	
2023	Ma'am Chief: Shakedown in Seoul	Police Maj. Gen. Roy Ferrer	
2023	Kampon	Luis	
2024	Chances Are, You and I		
2025	Only We Know	William	
TBA	The Super Praybeyt Benjamin	Benjamin "Ben" Santos VII	

==== Television ====
Year	Title	Role	Notes
1993	Ipaglaban Mo!		Episode: "Talunan ang Magwagi"
1997	Wansapanataym		Episode: "Salamin"
2000	Tabing Ilog	Anne's father	
2005	Encantadia	Arvak	
2005–2006	Mga Anghel na Walang Langit	Philip Mendoza	
2007	SineSerye: May Minamahal	Cenon Fernandez	
2007	Margarita	Ramon Velasquez	
2008	Zaido: Pulis Pangkalawakan	Alberto Lorenzo	
2008	Palos	Ernesto Mario	
2008	Sine Novela: Gaano Kadalas ang Minsan	Patient	
2008–2009	Eva Fonda	Turing Dakila	
2009	Only You	Fernando "Nanding" Mendoza / Ramon	
2009	Maalaala Mo Kaya	Reynaldo Viceral (father of Vice Ganda)	Episode: "Bola/Ball"
2009–2010	George and Cecil	Damian Castro	
2010	Sine Novela: Gumapang Ka sa Lusak	Governor Edmundo Guatlo	
2010–2011	Bantatay	Rigor	
2011–2012	Angelito: Batang Ama	Delfin Dimaano	
2011–2013	Toda Max	Macario "Mac" Padausdos	
2012	Angelito: Ang Bagong Yugto	Delfin Dimaano	
2013–2014	Got to Believe	Tatay Poro	
2014	Villa Quintana	Don Manolo Quintana	
2014	My Destiny	Arnold Dela Rosa	
2015	Once Upon a Kiss	Pedring Servando	
2015	The Rich Man's Daughter	Oscar "Oca" Tanchingco	
2016	Be My Lady	Emilio "Emil" Crisostomo	
2017–2018	Super Ma'am	Chaplin Henerala	
2018	Contessa	Pablo Venganza	
2018	Victor Magtanggol	Tomas Magtanggol	
2020	Fluid	Papa Eric	
2021	Legal Wives	Hasheeb Makadatu	
2022	Bolera	Jose Maria "Joma/JoMaster" Fajardo Sr.	
2022	The Iron Heart	Homer Adelantar	
2023	Magandang Dilag	Joaquin Robles	
2023	Walang Matigas Na Pulis sa Matinik Na Misis	Police Col. Manuel Galang	
2023	Maging Sino Ka Man	Osmundo Salazar	
2024	The Bagman		
2024	Shining Inheritance	Bonifacio "Boni" Perez	
2025	Sanggang-Dikit FR	Victor "Amo" Santiago	
2026	The Alibi: Ang Buong Katotohanan	Emilio	

| 2026 || "The Master Cutter" General Mercado || |}
