= Blood compact (disambiguation) =

A blood compact was an ancient ritual in the Philippines intended to seal a friendship or treaty, or to validate an agreement.

Blood compact may also refer to:

- Sandugo, a blood compact performed between Miguel López de Legazpi and Datu Sikatuna in the Philippines in 1565
- The Blood Compact, an 1886 painting by Juan Luna
- Blood Compact (film), a 1972 Philippine film

== See also ==
- Blood Oath (disambiguation)
- Blood Pact (disambiguation)
- Blood Promise (disambiguation)
