= Pacto de sangre =

Pacto de Sangre is a Spanish phrase meaning "blood compact". It may refer to:

- Blood compact (Pacto de sangre in Spanish or Sanduguan in Filipino), an ancient ritual in the Philippines
- Sandugo, a "pacto de sangre" in 1565 between leaders of the Spaniards and Filipinos
- El Pacto de Sangre, an 1886 painting by Filipino painter and hero Juan Luna
- Pacto de Sangre (album), a 2004 studio album released by Los Tigres del Norte
- Pacto de sangre (Chilean TV series), a 2018 Chilean telenovela
- Pacto de sangre (Mexican TV series), an upcoming Mexican television series based on the 2018 Chilean telenovela

== See also ==
- Blood Pact (disambiguation)
- Pacto de Sangue, a 2018 Brazilian crime drama television series
