= Kumander Bawang: Kalaban ng Mga Aswang =

1988 fantasy comedy film starring Herbert Bautista

- Directed by: Ramje
- Screenplay by: Jose Javier Reyes; Jojo Lapuz
- Story by: Jojo Lapuz
- Produced by: Ramon Salvador
- Starring: Herbert Bautista
- Cinematography: Rody Lacap
- Edited by: Augusto Salvador
- Music by: Mon del Rosario
- Production company: Viva Films
- Release date: September 29, 1988
- Country: Philippines
- Language: Filipino

Kumander Bawang: Kalaban ng Mga Aswang (transl. Commander Garlic: Enemy of the Aswang), or simply Kumander Bawang, is a 1988 Filipino fantasy comedy film directed by Ramje and starring Herbert Bautista as the titular character, alongside Mat Ranillo III, Matet, Mia Prats, Timmy Cruz, Jigo Garcia, Jay Jay Salvador, Vina Morales, Joko Diaz, and Ronald Jayme. Produced by Viva Films, the film was released in theaters on September 29, 1988. Critic Lav Diaz gave Kumander Bawang a negative review, criticizing the film's stale and clichéd comedy.

Bautista later reprised the role of Kumander Bawang in the 2006 fantaserye Super Inggo. He has a son named Boy Bawang in Super Inggo.

== Plot ==
In the town of Matang Bato, Tikboy is a bumbling young man who works as moro-moro performer in a theater company operated by his grandfather, Ambo. While performing the play at the town fiesta, Tikboy leaves the stage to take a dump in the woods. However, he flees in terror and gets lost after encountering numerous monsters, eventually finding a cave inhabited by a hermit, Kulog, who offers him shelter. Inside, Tikboy sees that Kulog has modern appliances and learns that he is actually the master of the monsters he encountered, where Kulog reveals they are his allies against a threat, but his prolonged absence leads to the play being abandoned.

Kulog tells Tikboy of his late father, Luis, who was the famous Kumander Bawang, a superhero who fights aswangs led by their king, Conde Regalado. Twenty years before, Luis had killed Regalado, who pledged to rise again after that time. Kulog reveals that it is exactly the 20th anniversary of Regalado's death and shows him on a television Regalado and his forces rising up and gathering at his old mansion, Villa Regalado, to kill the townsfolk in Matang Bato, while also abducting innocent people to use as his pawns in order to fulfil his goal of making evil rule once again. The mass abduction of innocent residents causes chaos, forcing the survivors, including Ambo and the theater company to flee. Kulog tells Tikboy that he has been called upon to inherit the identity of Kumander Bawang and gives him equipment to fight the aswangs, but tells him to find the necklace that would give him the superpowers that Luis gave to a priest.

Tikboy finds the necklace worn by Luningning, a little girl who is the daughter of an aswang and lives with the priest's sisters Trining and Maxima. Tikboy rescues Luningning when the aswangs attack her house and convinces her to give him the necklace, enabling him to transform into Kumander Bawang and defeat the aswangs. However, Luningning's guardians are killed by the creatures, forcing Tikboy to leave her in the care of Hospicio de San Jose, a welfare home and orphanage run by nuns. A surviving aswang, who is an acquaintance of Luningning's mother, reports to Regalado about Luningning. Regalado orders Luningning be captured as she is the princess of the aswangs.

As news of Kumander Bawang's exploits spread, Ambo realizes that Tikboy is actually Kumander Bawang and rejoices at his survival. Inspired by this, Ambo convinces his fellow townspeople to raze Villa Regalado. Arriving there, they battle numerous aswangs with the help of Kumander Bawang, who engages in a faceoff with Regalado and defeats the latter and his high-rank minions by feeding him and throwing explosive garlic into their coffins. The remaining aswangs are then killed or flee. However, Regalado's niece, Wanda, discovers Luningning in the orphanage and shapeshifts into Maxima to lure her. As Wanda is about to escape, Kumander Bawang arrives and exposes her, leading to a chase throughout the orphanage's courtyard that culminates with Bawang throwing her into a statue of Mary, which destroys her via lightning.

The children and nuns in the orphanage thank Kumander Bawang and bid him farewell. Later, Tikboy returns the necklace to Kulog, but the latter tells him to keep it, saying that Kumander Bawang is still needed as the threat of the aswangs remains. Tikboy then flies off in his Kumander Bawang persona.

== Cast ==
- Herbert Bautista as Tikboy / Kumander Bawang
- Mat Ranillo III as Conde Regalado
- Matet as Luningning
- Mia Prats as Liwayway
- Timmy Cruz as Carmen
- Jigo Garcia as Odie
- Jay Jay Salvador as Ernesto
- Vina Morales as Vinia
- Joko Diaz as Kiko
- Ronald Jayme as Nestor
- Melissa Perez Rubio
- Berting Labra as Lolo Ambo
- Vangie Labalan as Ek-Ek
- Lito Anzurez
- Bebong Osorio
- Dick Israel
- Balot
- Jenny Francisco
- Paulo Delgado
- Byron Lozano

== Music ==
The music of Kumander Bawang and the music of Buy One, Take One were released together by Viva Records in one album titled Kumander Bawang: Kalaban ng Aswang/Buy One, Take One: Viva Films Original Movie Soundtrack.

== Critical response ==
Lav Diaz, writing for the Manila Standard, gave a negative review of the film for its cliché and stale comedy, noting that it is due to it being geared towards children. He commended, however, the engaging plotline involving Berting Labra's grandfather character struggling to keep the moro-moro stage tradition alive.
