= Kung Kasalanan Man =

1989 thriller melodrama film by Eddie Garcia

- Official movie poster
- Directed by: Eddie Garcia
- Screenplay by: Amado Lacuesta Jr.; Raquel Villavicencio
- Story by: Gilda Olvidado
- Based on: Kung Kasalanan Man by Gilda Olvidado
- Produced by: William C. Leary
- Starring: Dina Bonnevie; Timmy Cruz; Tonton Gutierrez; Julio Diaz
- Cinematography: Joe Batac Jr.
- Edited by: Ike Jarlego Jr.
- Music by: Jaime Fabregas
- Production company: Viva Films
- Distributed by: Viva Films
- Release date: 21 June 1989
- Running time: 121 minutes
- Country: Philippines
- Language: Filipino

Kung Kasalanan Man (English: If It's A Sin) is a 1989 Philippine thriller melodrama film directed by Eddie Garcia from a screenplay by Amado Lacuesta Jr. and Raquel Villavicencio, based on a komiks serial of the same name written by Gilda Olvidado. It revolves around two Irmas: one is the real Irma, who has owned properties, and the other is Jo, the fake Irma, who is the former's high school friend who stole the former's identity by having plastic surgery after her former lover beat her and destroyed her face.

Produced and released by Viva Films, the film stars Dina Bonnevie, Timmy Cruz, Tonton Gutierrez, and Julio Diaz, with the film's theme song "Kung Kasalanan Man" performed by Rey Valera, cinematography by Joe Batac Jr., and its musical score composed by Jaime Fabregas. The film was theatrically released on 21 June 1989, to a critical and box office success.

== Plot ==
Irma is married to Raullo Ferrer, her husband with shady business dealings, and has a daughter, Yvette. However, after experiencing a near-death experience with the unidentified men who fired gunshots at the front of their house, she decides that she and Yvette will go to the United States. While Irma and her daughter go to America and Raullo is on a business trip in Australia, she assigns Jo, her longtime friend since high school, as a house sitter. While doing so, Jo began stealing things owned by Irma inside the house, including jewelry, fancy clothes, and her safe box. One night, when Jo reunites with her former lover Alvaro, she tries to seduce him, but she ends up being severely mauled by Alvaro. Because of this, she vows to take revenge against him and his current lover.

With the jewelry and safe box, which contained her photos and bank accounts, that Jo stole, she succeeded in stealing Irma's identity through plastic surgery. When Jo, now the fake Irma, returns to the mansion, many people, including Aling Miding, thought that their employer would stay for a long time in America. By the time she received a call from the true Irma, Jo changed the house's telephone number (to which Irma's aunt, Tiya Bining, complained), transferred Irma's bank accounts from a bank she is a loyal client of to a new one, and replaced Aling Miding and her fellow house helpers with different people. One night, the fake Irma succeeds in killing Alvaro at the hotel and his girlfriend at their house. The following day, Raullo returned home from his business trip, only to be refused to let him in by the new house helpers, and met his demise when unknown assailants shot him to death. At the hospital, it was revealed that Alvaro survived, and he found the identity of a woman who stabbed him in a newspaper; unknown to him, she is Jo.

On the day of Raullo's funeral, Dan Ramirez, Irma's former lover, shows up and begins a new relationship with the fake Irma. When the true Irma and her daughter Yvette returned to the Philippines, Tiya Bining and Aling Miding realized that they were in America all along and informed Irma about a string of events that occurred during their absence, including Raullo's violent death. When Tiya Bining shows Irma and Yvette their house, Irma sadly realizes that their house was sold to a different person. At her lawyer's office, Irma was informed by Atty. Rafael Castro about her forthcoming wedding, which confuses her. At the church, the true Irma found out that Jo stole her identity and married Dan.

Because of the return of the true Irma, the fake Irma anonymously calls Alvaro, who has visible facial scars, and gives him the address of the true Irma, who temporarily stays at her aunt's house. One morning, the two Irmas face each other, and the true Irma angrily calls Jo an "impostor". Later, Irma returns home, only to be kidnapped by Alvaro, who takes her to a dilapidated house. When Irma regained consciousness, Alvaro attempts to rape her violently as an act of revenge, but the latter escaped successfully. On the following day, Irma visits Dan at the office, only for Dan to realize that she is the true Irma while the Irma whom he marries is Jo.

With Dan realizing that he is married to the fake Irma, he makes a plan to leave the country with the true Irma and Yvette. While the three stay at the hotel, the fake Irma shows up. On the same night, Alvaro notices the van, which Tiya Bining is inside, and starts following them to the hotel. While intruding on their hotel room, the fake Irma shoots the true Irma and exits. Unfortunately for the fake Irma, Alvaro starts shooting at her.

The gunfight continues when the fake Irma tries to escape at the emergency stairwell, and Alvaro follows her, followed by Dan. When she accidentally slipped on the stairs, Alvaro shot the fake Irma to death and left the scene after he finished the job.

Fortunately, the true Irma survived the attempted fatal shooting by Jo, much to Dan's relief. The next day, Irma, Dan, and Yvette leave the hotel and say farewell to Tiya Bining before they go to Paris. Alvaro, who is in his car, notices Irma in a taxi, whom he sees is alive, and wants to finish her. However, it never materialized as he realized that they had gone to the airport and moved on. The film ends with the plane bound for France taking off.

== Cast ==
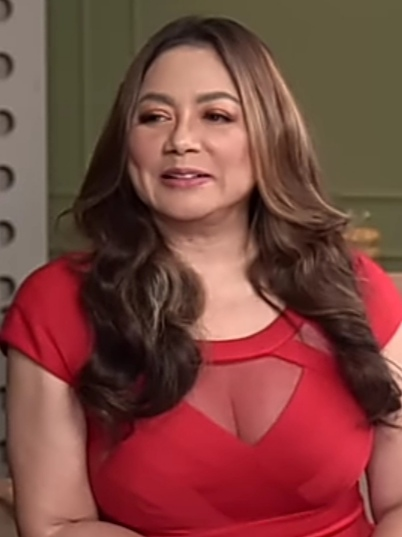
Dina Bonnevie plays two characters in the film: a true Irma and a fake Irma.
- Dina Bonnevie as:
  - Irma Ferrer: Raullo's wife and Yvette's mother, whose identity was stolen by Jo.
  - Jo (the fake Irma)
- Timmy Cruz as Josephine "Jo" Quintos: A high school friend of Irma who later steals Irma's identity.
- Tonton Gutierrez as Dan Ramirez: Irma's high school sweetheart, who would later realize that he is married to a false Irma (Jo Quintos).
- Julio Diaz as Alvaro: Jo's former lover who destroyed her face before she became Irma.
- Roy Alvarez as Raullo Ferrer: Irma's husband, who received death threats from a group of unknown assailants.
- Alicia Alonzo as Belinda "Tiya Bining" Rosales: Irma's aunt, and Yvette's grandaunt.
- Sunshine Dizon as Yvette Ferrer: Irma and Raullo's daughter. In the end, she becomes Dan's stepdaughter.
- Vangie Labalan as Aling Miding: Irma's trusted house helper.

Other cast includes Suzanne Gonzales as Alvaro's girlfriend, Ernie Zarate as the plastic surgeon, Koko Trinidad as Atty. Rafael P. Castro, Irma's lawyer, and Merla Verdeflor as Mrs. Domingo.

== Production ==
=== Casting ===
In April 1988, during its development phase, Gabby Concepcion and Ronald Jayme were originally part of the project but left without any cited reason. To prepare for the role of Josephine "Jo" Quintos, actress Timmy Cruz went to the nightclubs of Mabini to observe the characteristics and behaviors of the female patrons, as well as going to the hotel lobby of Manila Peninsula by herself.

=== Filming ===
In the intimate scene featuring Alvaro and the false Irma, a thick plaster was put on Julio Diaz's front to "prevent sexual excitement" on Dina Bonnevie, but it did not work.

== Reception ==
=== Accolades ===
Award-giving organization	Date of ceremony	Category	Recipient(s)	Result	Ref.
38th FAMAS Awards	19 May 1990	Best Actress	Dina Bonnevie	Nominated	
38th FAMAS Awards	19 May 1990	Best Child Actress	Sunshine Dizon	Nominated	
