= Masamang Ugat =

Philippine action film

- Directed by: Willy Milan
- Written by: Willy Milan; Marlon Rivero
- Produced by: Vincent del Rosario III; Veronique del Rosario-Corpus
- Starring: Eddie Garcia; Ace Vergel; Victor Neri; Mikey Arroyo
- Cinematography: Jun Pereira
- Edited by: Rene Tala
- Music by: Jaime Fabregas
- Production company: Viva Films
- Distributed by: Viva Films
- Release date: July 18, 2003
- Running time: 100 minutes
- Country: Philippines
- Language: Filipino

Masamang Ugat is a 2003 Philippine action film co-written and directed by Willy Milan. The film stars Eddie Garcia, Ace Vergel, Victor Neri and Mikey Arroyo. This marks Ace Vergel's final theatrical appearance.

== Cast ==
- Eddie Garcia as Apo Roman
- Ace Vergel as David
- Victor Neri as Darwin
- Mikey Arroyo as Lt. Angelo Santos
- Maui Taylor as Lara
- Al Tantay as Ismael Valdez
- Levi Ignacio as Satur
- Susan Africa as Mercedes
- Gwen Garci as Gina
- Alicia Lane as Isabel
- Vanna Garcia as Liezel
- Eddie Arenas as Tata Simon
- Gamaliel Viray as Artemio
- Ama Quiambao as Alicia
- Bon Vibar as Col. Sanchez
- Kathy Mori as Cathy
- Manjo del Mundo as Ben Real
- Vic Belaro as De Castro
- Marvin Uchida
