= Alyas Pogi =

Filipino action film series

- Owners: Solar Entertainment (Birador ng Nueva Ecija, 2); Star Cinema (Ang Pagbabalik)
- Years: 1990–present

Films and television
- Film(s): Alyas Pogi: Birador ng Nueva Ecija (1990); Alyas Pogi 2 (1992); Alyas Pogi: Ang Pagbabalik (1999)

Alyas Pogi (lit. 'Alias Handsome') is a Filipino action film series revolving around the main character of Henry "Alyas Pogi" Cruz portrayed by Bong Revilla. Loosely based on the life of patrolman Enrique "Henry" S. Cruz of Nueva Ecija, three entries to the series have been released so far: Alyas Pogi: Birador ng Nueva Ecija (1990), Alyas Pogi 2 (1992), and Alyas Pogi: Ang Pagbabalik (1999).

In April 2024, Revilla announced a fourth entry, titled Birador: Alyas Pogi 4, as his comeback film after a long absence from the big screen.

== Films ==
Film	Release date	Director(s)	Screenwriter(s)	Story by	Producer(s)
Alyas Pogi: Birador ng Nueva Ecija	November 28, 1990	Joey Del Rosario	Joey Mortel	Nerdie Cruz (story research)	Jesusa Victoria Bautista
Alyas Pogi 2	August 26, 1992	Toto Natividad	Jun Lawas and Amado Lacuesta	Jun Lawas and Amado Lacuesta	Ramon Salvador
Alyas Pogi: Ang Pagbabalik	August 11, 1999	Joey Del Rosario	Bien Ojeda and Joey Del Rosario	Tammy Bejerano and Bien Ojeda	Malou N. Santos
Birador: Alyas Pogi 4	TBA	Dondon S. Santos	Nerdie Cruz		
