= Sgt. Ernesto 'Boy' Ybañez: Tirtir Gang =

1988 Filipino film starring Sonny Parsons

- Directed by: Willy Milan
- Written by: Wilfredo Milan; Bonnie Paredes; Irma Lucelo
- Starring: Sonny Parsons; Eddie Garcia; Vivian Foz; Charlie Davao; Romy Diaz; Carol Dauden
- Cinematography: Ver Dauz
- Edited by: Pat Ramos
- Music by: Willy Yusi
- Production companies: Double M Films; EG Productions
- Distributed by: Double M Films
- Release date: July 28, 1988
- Country: Philippines
- Language: Filipino

Sgt. Ernesto 'Boy' Ybañez: Tirtir Gang, or simply Tirtir Gang, is a 1988 Philippine action film co-written and directed by Willy Milan. The film stars Sonny Parsons as the titular character. Produced by Double M Films International, the film was released on July 28, 1988.

Critic Lav Diaz gave Tirtir Gang a negative review, criticizing its confusing characterizations and implausible action scenes which undercuts its assertion of being based on true events.

== Cast ==
- Sonny Parsons as Sgt. Ernesto 'Boy' Ybañez
- Eddie Garcia as Greg
- Vivian Foz as Chedeng
- Charlie Davao as Waldo
- Romy Diaz as Sgt. Macaroyo
- Lucita Soriano as Coching
- Carol Dauden as Grace
- Renato del Prado as Tata
- Roland Dantes as Col. Nabiula
- Ross Olgado as Col. Cruz
- Mario Escudero as a police reporter
- Usman Hassim as Erning Bakal
- Robert Miller as Robert
- Pons de Guzman as a judge
- Fred Moro as a gang leader
- Marco Polo as Tisoy
- Fernan Morato as Henry
- Garry Garcia as Garry
- Manny Doria as Manny
- Ben 'Pinoy' Sagmit as Ben Bisay
- Bong Varona as Bong
- Arlan Israel as Rolando
- Robert Talby as Roberto
- Tom Alvarez as Tommy
- Carlos David as Caloy
- Ver Rodriguez as Virgilio
- Stanley Orong as Stanley
- Arnold Esguerra as Arnold
- Rusty Santos as Gen. Ramos

== Release ==
Tirtir Gang was released on July 28, 1988.

=== Critical response ===
Lav Diaz, writing for the Manila Standard, gave Tirtir Gang a negative review. He criticized the film's confusing depiction of its characters, highlighting the main character Ybañez as being depicted a good man but is shown throughout the story hanging around his criminal friends, neglecting his family, and committing adultery with a hostess, resulting in an unconvincing film. Diaz also noted that because the film is based on a true story, the excessive action scenes and the implausible depiction of a tactically poor Sparrow Unit, a revolutionary group of the New People's Army, negatively underscores the artistic liberties taken by the film.
