= Kailan Sasabihing Mahal Kita? =

Kailan Sasabihing Mahal Kita
- Directed by: Eddie Garcia
- Screenplay by: Orlando R. Nadres
- Story by: Gilda Olvidado
- Produced by: Ramon Salvador
- Starring: Christopher de Leon; Sharon Cuneta
- Cinematography: Joe Batac Jr.
- Edited by: Ike Jarlego Jr.
- Music by: George Canseco
- Production company: Viva Films
- Distributed by: Viva Films
- Release date: November 25, 1985
- Running time: 113 minutes
- Country: Philippines
- Language: Filipino

Kailan Sasabihing Mahal Kita (lit. 'When To Say I Love You') is a 1985 Philippine romantic drama film directed by Eddie Garcia from a screenplay by Orlando R. Nadres, based on the komiks serial by Gilda Olvidado. The film stars Christopher de Leon and Sharon Cuneta in their second film together since Bituing Walang Ningning, with the supporting cast includes Joel Alano, Cherie Gil, Armida Siguion-Reyna, Eddie Rodriguez, and Liza Lorena, and special participation of Paraluman.

Produced and distributed by Viva Films, the film was theatrically released on November 25, 1985.

== Plot ==
Arra (Sharon Cuneta) is a young woman involved in a scandal with her ex-boyfriend. She was arranged to marry an older man, but close family friend Jake (Christopher De Leon) takes responsibility and enters into a marriage of convenience with Arra, instead. Romance blossomed within the pretend-marriage, but Jake’s girlfriend (Cherie Gil) comes back into the scene to express disagreement with the setup.

== Cast ==
- Christopher De Leon as Jake Abelardo
- Sharon Cuneta as Arra Sevilla
- Eddie Rodriguez as Bob Sevilla
- Cherie Gil as Arianne Velez
- Armida Siguion-Reyna as Donya Amelia Abelardo
- Joel Alano as Henri Ortiz
- Liza Lorena as Mila Sevilla
- Vic Diaz as Romy de Gracia
- Romy Rivera as Ben Ortiz
- Delia Razon as Meding Ortiz
- Deborah Sun as Sandra Velez
- Encar Benedicto as Carol Velez
- Paraluman as Luz Tuazon
- Virgie Montes as Auntie Teresing

== Production and Release ==
The movie was produced by Viva films and was released on 26 November 1985.
