= Mikey Arroyo =

Filipino politician and former actor (born 1969)

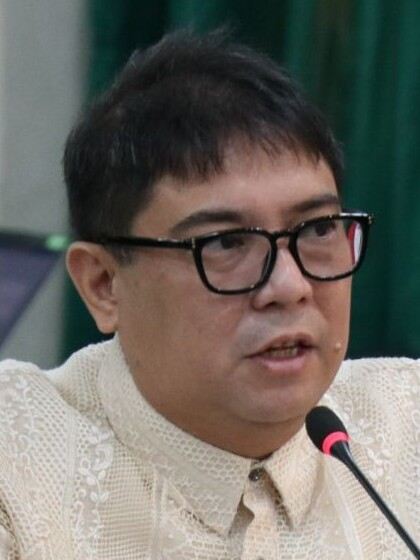
- Arroyo in 2022

Member of the Philippine House of Representatives from Pampanga's 2nd congressional district
- In office June 30, 2019 – June 30, 2022
- Preceded by: Gloria Macapagal Arroyo
- Succeeded by: Gloria Macapagal Arroyo
- In office June 30, 2004 – June 30, 2010
- Preceded by: Zenaida Cruz-Ducut
- Succeeded by: Gloria Macapagal Arroyo

Member of the House of Representatives for Ang Galing Pinoy Partylist
- In office June 30, 2010 – June 30, 2013

Vice Governor of Pampanga
- In office June 30, 2001 – June 30, 2004
- Governor: Lito Lapid
- Preceded by: Clayton Olalia
- Succeeded by: Yeng Guiao

Personal details
- Born: April 26, 1969 (age 57) Makati, Rizal, Philippines
- Party: Lakas (2001–present)
- Other political affiliations: Ang Galing Pinoy (partylist; 2009–2013)
- Spouse: Angela Montenegro (m. 2002)
- Children: 2
- Parent(s): Jose Miguel Arroyo (father); Gloria Macapagal Arroyo (mother)
- Relatives: Dato Arroyo (brother)
- Education: Ateneo de Manila University; University of California, Berkeley (MBA)

Juan Miguel "Mikey" Macapagal Arroyo (Tagalog pronunciation: [hwan mɪˈɡɛl ˈmaɪki makapaˈɡal ɐˈɾɔjɔ]; born April 26, 1969) is a Filipino politician and former actor who served as the Representative of Pampanga's 2nd district from 2019 to 2022 and previously from 2004 to 2010. He previously served as the vice governor of Pampanga from 2001 to 2004. Born into the Macapagal family of Pampanga, his mother, Gloria Macapagal Arroyo, served as the 14th president of the Philippines, former Speaker of the House and Vice President. His father, Jose Miguel Arroyo, is a descendant of Philippine Revolutionary General, Aniceto Lacson of Negros Occidental. His maternal grandfather, Diosdado Macapagal, was the 9th president.

== Early life and education ==
Arroyo was born on April 26, 1969 in Makati (then-municipality of Rizal) to Jose Miguel Arroyo and Gloria Macapagal Arroyo. He is the eldest of three siblings. He studied Ateneo de Manila University for his college education. He obtained a master's degree in business administration at the University of California, Berkeley.

== Acting career ==
Arroyo dabbled in acting prior to becoming a politician, and while he was vice governor of Pampanga. Arroyo was linked to his leading ladies Rufa Mae Quinto and Maui Taylor, among others. His movie in the 2001 Metro Manila Film Festival, Di Kita Ma-Reach, bombed in the box office. Arroyo, as he was the presidential son, refrained from taking roles that show immorality. Arroyo's family stayed in the Malacañang Palace during the term of his mother.

== Political career ==
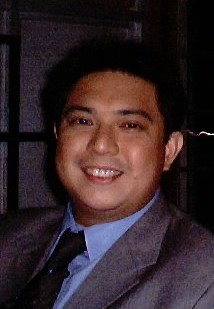
Arroyo in 2007

As vice governor, Arroyo said he ran for House representative from Pampanga's 2nd district as the incumbent was term-limited, and as it was a family decision. Arroyo won in 2004, and in 2007, Yeng Guiao (who had succeeded him as vice governor) expected Arroyo to run unopposed. In 2010, Arroyo instead ran under the party-list system under Ang Galing Pinoy (AGP). The party was originally an anti-crime group, but was disqualified by the Commission on Elections (COMELEC), leading them to reform as a party-list representing security guards and tricycle drivers. Arroyo was already helping the group, and financed their campaign. AGP won the party-list election, and secured a seat for Arroyo.

In the 2013 elections, the COMELEC disqualified AGP anew, having failed to represent marginalized sectors in Congress. Arroyo ran anew in 2019, this time representing Pampanga's 2nd district again, as the incumbent, her mother Gloria Macapagal Arroyo, was term-limited. Mikey won. Later on, on July 10, 2020, Arroyo was among the 70 representatives who voted "yes" to reject the franchise renewal of ABS-CBN, the Philippine's largest television network. Two months later, he proposed the suggestion to postpone the 2022 Philippine elections due to the COVID-19 pandemic. He later confirmed that his mother would run in his stead in 2022.

== Controversies ==
In August 2009, Vera Files, a group of veteran Filipino journalists, reported that Arroyo "has failed to declare in his Statement of Assets, Liabilities and Networth (SALN) for the last two years a $1.32 million or P63.7 million beachfront property in the San Francisco Bay Area in California, which he bought and then transferred to his wife Angela in 2006." The house is located in Beach Park Boulevard in Foster City in San Mateo County. He defended himself by saying that the money he used in acquiring these properties came from cash gifts he received for his wedding as well as from campaign contributions.

Nearly two years later, the Bureau of Internal Revenue (BIR) filed tax evasion charges against Arroyo and his wife Angela for not filing income tax returns for the years 2005, 2008 and 2009. BIR Chief Kim Jacinto-Henares mentioned that based on the documents her agency had obtained, the couple owes the government ₱73.85 million in unpaid taxes. Arroyo lawyer Ruy Rondain questioned the timing of the filing of these charges. In 2018, the Court of Tax Appeals dismissed Arroyo's tax evasion case.

== Personal life ==
Arroyo married his second cousin, Angela Montenegro in 2002. In 2017, Arroyo was involved in a vehicular accident in Bacolor, where his driver was killed. In 2025, he underwent surgery after being diagnosed with stage 1 thyroid cancer.

== Filmography ==
- Anak, Pagsubok Lamang (1996)
- Hawak Ko Buhay Mo (1997)
- Tapatan ng Tapang (1997)
- Ang Maton at ang Showgirl (1998)
- Ang Boyfriend Kong Pari (1999)
- Largado, Ibabalik Kita sa Pinanggalingan Mo! (1999)
- Ako'y Ibigin Mo, Lalaking Matapang (1999)
- Di Ko Kayang Tanggapin (2000)
- Super Idol (2001)
- Mahal Kita... Kahit Sino Ka Pa (2001)
- Di Kita Ma-Reach (2001)
- Walang Iba Kundi Ikaw (2002)
- A.B. Normal College: Todo Na 'Yan! Kulang Pa 'Yun! (2003)
- Masamang Ugat (2003)
- Sablay Ka Na... Pasaway Ka Pa... (2005)

Political offices
| Preceded by Clayton Olalia | Vice Governor of Pampanga; 2001–2004 | Succeeded by Yeng Guiao |
House of Representatives of the Philippines
| Preceded by Zenaida Cruz-Ducut | Representative, Pampanga's 2nd district 2004–2010 | Succeeded by Gloria Macapagal Arroyo |
| New seat | Representative, Ang Galing Pinoy; 2010–2013 | Most recent |
| Preceded by Gloria Macapagal Arroyo | Representative, Pampanga's 2nd district 2019–2022 | Succeeded by Gloria Macapagal Arroyo |
