= Barumbado =

- Directed by: Willie Milan
- Written by: Humilde 'Meek' Roxas
- Produced by: Roberto U. Genova; Lorena S. Duran
- Starring: Robin Padilla
- Cinematography: Joe Tutanes
- Edited by: Ruben Natividad
- Music by: Rey Valera
- Production company: Double M Productions
- Distributed by: GMA Rainbow Television Arts (now GMA Pictures)
- Release dates: March 21, 1990 (Manila); April 24, 1990 (Davao)
- Country: Philippines
- Language: Filipino
- Box office: ₱16 million

Barumbado (transl. Temperamental) is a 1990 Filipino action film directed by Willie Milan.

== Plot ==
Eric was an orphan who grew up to be a fearless drug dealer who had an affair with Mona-lisa who has cared for him since he was young. But he had his eye on her step-daughter. Her husband discovered the affair and he kills her while Eric was trying to escape and killing his enemies along the way.

== Cast ==
- Robin Padilla as Eric
- Monica Herrera
- Lani Lobangco
- Pinky de Leon
- Michael de Mesa as Cpl. Gonzales
- Bomber Moran
- Val Iglesia as Johnny
- Romeo Rivera as Ignacio
- Jun Hidalgo
- July Hidalgo
- Ivan Duval
- Edward Luna
- Eric Lorenzo
- Ramon Recto
- Rudy Ramirez
- Rolly Banzil
- Polly Cadsawan
- Bong Varona
- Rene Hawkins
- Usman Hassim
- Bebeng Amora
- Eddie Tuazon

== Awards and recognition ==
The film received a 1991 FAMAS Award nomination for Best Actor for Robin Padilla.

== Box office ==
The action movie was one of the biggest hit of 1990 and pave the stardom of Robin Padilla
