= Willie Milan =

Filipino film director and screenwriter

Willy Milan
- Born: Wilfredo Dela Cruz; August 25, 1947; Manila, Philippines
- Died: November 8, 2015 (aged 68); Quezon City
- Occupation(s): Film director and screenwriter
- Spouse: Salomia
- Children: Wilsa, Wexter, Wilma

Wilfredo dela Cruz (August 25, 1947 – November 8, 2015), better known as Willy Milan, was a Filipino film director and screenwriter. He was best known for his work in the action genre.

In 1983 he won the Best Director and Best Screenwriter Awards at the Metro Manila Film Festival for Bago Kumalat ang Kamandag.

In 1996 he won a FAMAS Award for Best Director for his film, Kahit Butas ng Karayom.

== Filmography ==
=== As director ===
- W Is War (1983)
- Bago Kumalat ang Kamandag (1983)
- Clash of the Warlords (1985)
- Moises Padilla Story (1985)
- Ultimax Force (1986)
- Revenge of the Street Warrior (1986)
- Ultimatum: Ceasefire! (1987)
- Anak ng Cabron (1987)
- Sgt. Ernesto 'Boy' Ybañez: Tirtir Gang (1988)
- Gawa Na ang Bala Na Papatay sa Iyo (1988)
- Ang Pumatay ng Dahil sa Iyo (1989)
- Barumbado (1990)
- Dalawa Man ang Buhay Mo, Pagsasabayin Ko (1991)
- Tikboy Tikas at mga Khroaks Boys (1993)
- Kahit Butas ng Karayom Papasukin Ko (1995)
- Di Ko Kayang Tanggapin (2000)
- Super Idol (2001)
- Di Kita Ma-Reach (2001)
- Masamang Ugat (2003)
- Sablay Ka Na, Pasaway Ka Pa (2005)

== Awards ==
Year	Group	Category	Work	Result
1983	Metro Manila Film Festival	Best Director	Bago Kumalat ang Kamandag	Won
1983	Metro Manila Film Festival	Best Screenplay (with Ronnie Paredes)	Bago Kumalat ang Kamandag	Won
