= Dalawa Man ang Buhay Mo, Pagsasabayin Ko =

Philippine action film

- Directed by: Willy Milan
- Screenplay by: George Cavestany; Marcelino Cavestany
- Story by: Willy Milan; Marcelino Cavestany
- Produced by: Rosita Go
- Starring: Ronnie Ricketts
- Cinematography: Joe Tutanes
- Edited by: Ever Ramos
- Music by: Willy Yusi
- Production company: First Films
- Distributed by: First Films
- Release date: July 4, 1991
- Running time: 110 minutes
- Country: Philippines
- Languages: Filipino; English

Dalawa Man ang Buhay Mo, Pagsasabayin Ko (lit. Even If You Have Two Lives, I Will Make Them Together) is a 1991 Philippine action film co-written and directed by Willy Milan. The film stars Ronnie Ricketts on dual roles.

The film marks First Films' first venture into local production after distribution of Hong Kong–based action movies to the Philippines.

== Plot ==
Sonny Boy (Ricketts) and his father Rafael (Alvarez) team up to avenge the murder of his twin brother Robert (Ricketts).

== Cast ==
- Ronnie Ricketts as Robert / Sonny Boy
- Mark Gil as Alex
- Rina Reyes as Mae Ann
- Roy Alvarez as Rafael
- Marissa Delgado as Aida
- Juan Rodrigo as Ruben
