= Alyas Pogi: Birador ng Nueva Ecija =

- Directed by: Joey Del Rosario
- Screenplay by: Joey Mortel; Humilde "Meek" Roxas
- Story by: Nerdie Cruz
- Produced by: Jesusa Victoria Bautista
- Starring: Ramon "Bong" Revilla Jr.
- Cinematography: Ambo Bautista
- Edited by: Edgardo Vinarao
- Music by: Jaime Fabregas
- Production company: RRJ Productions
- Distributed by: Moviestars Production
- Release date: November 28, 1990
- Running time: 108 minutes
- Country: Philippines
- Languages: Filipino; English

Alyas Pogi: Birador ng Nueva Ecija (lit. Alias Handsome: Triggerman of Nueva Ecija) is a 1990 Filipino action film directed by Joey Del Rosario. It stars Bong Revilla as the titular character. The film was the first installment of the Alyas Pogi film series. It has been followed by sequels Alyas Pogi 2 (1992), Alyas Pogi: Ang Pagbabalik (1999), and Birado. Beginning of production of a fourth entry, titled Birador: Alyas Pogi 4, was announced by Revilla in April 2024.

The film is streaming online on YouTube.

== Cast ==
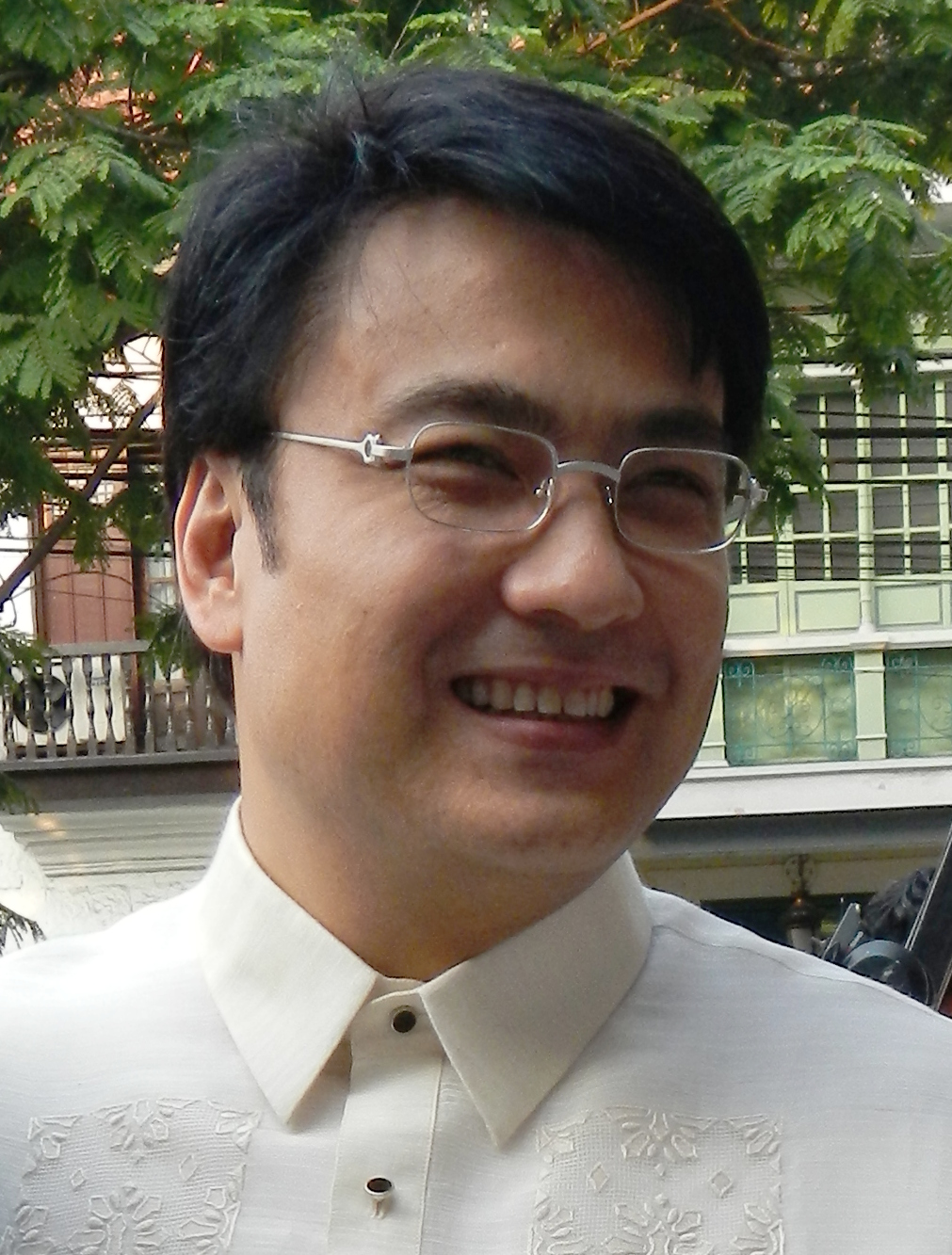
Ramon Bong Bong Revilla, Jr. portrays Pat. Enrique "Henry" S. Cruz/"Alyas Pogi".

- Ramon "Bong" Revilla Jr. as Pat. Enrique "Henry" S. Cruz/"Alyas Pogi"
- Janice De Belen as Estela Mallari-Cruz
- Edu Manzano as Agapito Rodrigo
- Johnny Delgado as Hepe Banson
- Tommy Abuel as Erning
- Bernard Bonnin as Don Pepe Rodrigo
- Baldo Marro as Banjo
- George Estregan Jr. as Emilio Mallari
- Robert Talabis as Pablo Mallari
- Rez Cortez as Alex
- Bomber Moran as Cardong Kalabaw
- Edwin Reyes as Erik Rodrigo
- Roldan Aquino as Big Boy
- Gary "Boy" Garcia Jr. as Dante
- Christopher Paloma as Atong
- Ruben Rustia as Padre Jose
- Lito Anzures as Mang Lucio
- Lucita Soriano as Aling Senyang
- Renato del Prado as Guido
- Ernie Ortega as Mr. Ching
- Ernie David as David
- Vic Belaro as Victor
- Polly Cadsawan as Poldo
- James Raymundo as Jam Jam

== Production ==
As late as November 3, 1990, the film had the title Pat. Henry Cruz: Alias Pogi before it was changed to Alyas Pogi: Birador ng Nueva Ecija.
