= Blood Promise =

Blood Promise may refer to:

- Blood Promise (novel), a 2009 novel by Richelle Mead
- Blood Promise, a 1975 Hong Kong film
- A Blood Promise, a 2009 box set by Her Name Is Calla
- "Blood Promise", 1995 song by Swans on studio album The Great Annihilator

== See also ==
- Blood compact (disambiguation)
- Blood Oath (disambiguation)
- Blood Pact (disambiguation)
