= Ultimatum: Ceasefire! =

1987 action film starring Ramon Revilla Sr.

- Directed by: Wilfredo Milan; Bert R. Mendoza; Jerry O. Tirazona
- Screenplay by: Diego Cagahastian; Jose N. Carreon; Mauro Gia Samonte
- Story by: Tony S. Mortel
- Starring: Ramon Revilla; Eddie Garcia; Marianne de la Riva; Aurora Sevilla; Conrad Poe; Nick Romano; Joonee Gamboa; Renato del Prado; Ernie Ortega; Lala Montelibano
- Cinematography: Ricardo Herrera
- Edited by: Ruben Natividad
- Music by: Nonoy Tan
- Production company: Urban Films
- Distributed by: Urban Films
- Release date: April 2, 1987
- Running time: 92 minutes
- Country: Philippines
- Language: Filipino

Ultimatum: Ceasefire! is a 1987 Filipino action film directed by Wilfredo Milan, Bert R. Mendoza and Jerry O. Tirazona. The film stars Ramon Revilla, Eddie Garcia, Marianne de la Riva, Aurora Sevilla, Conrad Poe, Nick Romano, Joonee Gamboa, Renato del Prado, Ernie Ortega, and Lala Montelibano. Produced by Urban Films, it was released on April 2, 1987.

Critic Justino Dormiendo of the Manila Standard gave the film a negative review, disparaging it as "a gross distortion of political realities that have engulfed our nation [...] in the last 365 days."

== Cast ==
- Ramon Revilla as Kumander Ibarra
- Eddie Garcia as Col. Gregorio Santos
- Marianne de la Riva
- Aurora Sevilla
- Conrad Poe
- Nick Romano
- Joonee Gamboa as the warlord
- Renato del Prado
- Ernie Ortega
- Lala Montelibano as a beerhouse dancer
- Victoria Dimaranan
- Rafael Soquez
- Joseph Serra
- Johnny Vicar
- Danny Riel
- Miguel Soquez

== Production ==
Shooting for Ultimatum: Ceasefire! began on February 12, 1987. A day later, lead actor Ramon Revilla broke his leg and had to recover for some time at his residence in Imus, Cavite. It was during this time that Revilla was convinced by his friends to run for senator in the 1987 Senate elections.

== Release ==
Ultimatum: Ceasefire! was released in theaters on April 2, 1987.

=== Critical response ===
Justino Dormiendo, writing for the Manila Standard, gave the film a negative review. He largely criticized the film's misguided presentation of how the insurgency issue then afflicting Philippine society could develop and thus disparaged it as "a gross distortion of political realities that have engulfed our nation [...] in the last 365 days." Dormiendo also took umbrage of Ramon Revilla's acting and the casting of Joonee Gamboa as the warlord.
