= Bernard Bonnin =

Filipino actor

- Born: Bernardo Zayco Bonnin; September 8, 1938; Himamaylan, Negros Occidental, Commonwealth of the Philippines
- Died: November 21, 2009 (aged 71); Quezon City, Philippines
- Occupation: Actor
- Years active: 1957–2009
- Children: Richard Bonnin; Charlene Gonzales
- Relatives: J.C. Bonnin (nephew)

Bernard Bonnin (born Bernardo Zayco Bonnin; September 8, 1938 – November 21, 2009) was a Filipino actor.

== Early life ==
He was born on September 8, 1938, to parents Juan S. Bonnin, a Spaniard from Palma de Mallorca, and Lina Zayco, a native of Himamaylan, Negros Occidental. He moved to Manila at the age of 14 to complete his secondary education in San Beda.

== Career ==
He rose to fame with the 1965 movie, Palos. In 2008, ABS-CBN remade Palos into a teleserye starring Jake Cuenca, with Bonnin returning in a supporting role. Bonnin appeared in over 100 films, including Gagamba, Ako ang Lalagot sa Hininga Mo, Code Name: Bomba, Target: Captain Karate. His first film was Ay Pepita.

In This Action Movie Villain Role of Ako ang Tatapos sa Araw mo (1989), Ibabaon Kita sa Lupa (1990), Dudurugin Kita ng Bala ko (1992), Nandito Ako (1994), and Duwelo (1996).

== Filmography ==
=== Film ===
- Walang Takot (1958)
- Anak ni Waray (1958)
- Kung Ako'y Mahal Mo - Virgilio (1960)
- Sandata at Pangako (1961)
- Alyas Palos - Palos (1961)
- Kambal Na Baril (1962)
- Jam Session - Dondoy (1962)
- Bakas ng Gagamba - Gagamba (1962)
- Dapit-Hapon: Oras ng Pagtutuos (1963)
- Kilabot Maghiganti (1963)
- Palos Kontra Gagamba (1963)
- Carioca (1963)
- Ang Mga Lawin (1963)
- Dakpin si Pedro Navarro! (1963)
- Ikaw Ako Ngayon Bukas (1963)
- Ang Lihim ni Gagamba (1964)
- 3 Musketeras (1964)
- Walang Duwag Na Bisaya (1965)
- Sandalyas ni Zafira (1965)
- Oro Blanco (1965)
- Doble 45 (1965)
- Tagisan ng Mga Agimat (1965)
- Batas ng .45 (1965)
- Lambat - Agent 707 (1965)
- La Sombra (1965)
- Pedrong Hunyango (1965)
- Karate sa Karate (1965)
- Doble Talim (1965)
- Wanted: Johnny L (1966)
- Palos: Counterspy (1966) - Palos
- Philcag in Vietnam (1967)
- Target Captain Karate (1968)
- Palos Strikes Again (1968)
- Bart Salamanca (1968)
- Gagamba at si Scorpio (1969) - Gagamba
- The Arizona Kid (1970)
- Women in Cages (1971) - Acosta
- Tatlong Patak ng Dugo ni Adan (1980)
- Alyas Palos II (1982) - Palos
- Buy One, Take One (1988)
- Ako ang Tatapos sa Araw Mo! (1989) - Martin
- Ibabaon Kita sa Lupa (1990) - Mayor Roman Romualdez
- Apoy sa Lupang Hinirang (1990)
- Hanggang Kailan Kita Papatay (1990) - Garrido Iglesia
- Alyas Pogi: Birador ng Nueva Ecija (1990) - Don Pepe
- Alyas Pogi 2 (1992) - Don Pepe
- Alyas Hunyango (1992) - Acosta
- Dudurugin Kita ng Bala Ko (1992) - Victor Riduque
- Big Boy Bato: Kilabot ng Kankaloo (1992) - Big Daddy
- Nandito Ako (1994) - Don Rodrigo Braganza
- Ikaw Pa ... Eh Love Kita (1995) - Major Morales
- Seth Corteza (1996)
- Duwelo (1996) - Eduardo Roldan
- Alamid: Ang Alamat (1998)
- Code Name: Bomba (1998) - Congressman Bambino
- Moises Archangel 2: Tapusin Natin ang Labanan (1998)
- Ako ang Lalagot sa Hininga Mo (1999)
- Masikip sa Dibdib (2004)

=== Television ===
- Palos - Vittorio Canavaro aka Ninong (2008)

== Death ==
Bonnin died at the age of 71 on November 21, 2009, at the Philippine Heart Center in Quezon City following multiple organ failure due to diabetes. He is buried at the Heritage Memorial Park in Taguig.
