= Ruben Rustia =

Filipino actor (1923–1994)

- Born: Ruben Matias Cayari; July 25, 1923; Manila, Philippines Islands
- Died: April 7, 1994 (aged 70); Manila, Philippines
- Occupations: Actor; screenwriter; director
- Years active: 1947–1994
- Children: 6

Ruben Matias Cayari (July 25, 1923 – April 7, 1994), professionally known as Ruben Rustia, was a Filipino actor and screenwriter. He is best known for his portrayal of President Ferdinand Marcos in the 1988 Australian miniseries A Dangerous Life.

He won the FAMAS Award for Best Supporting Actor for his performance in the 1954 fantasy film Pedro Penduko, and was later nominated for four more times in the same category as well as for Best Actor and Best Screenplay.

== Career ==
Ruben Rustia began his film career as an extra in the 1947 film Kamay ng Diyos (English: 'Hand of God'). His first supporting role was in the 1951 film Taga-Ilog, and he would later receive a reputation as a character actor.

In 1988, Rustia was cast in the role of President Ferdinand Marcos in the Australian miniseries A Dangerous Life (or The Four Day Revolution in Australia). Karla Delgado of the Manila Standard praised his performance as the president, stating that he "has Marcos' voice and mannerisms perfected."

In 1993, he performed as Kapitan Tiago in Eddie Romero's miniseries adaptation of José Rizal's novel Noli Me Tángere.

== Personal life ==
Rustia had six children with his wife Alejandra. He was a Methodist.

== Death ==
Rustia died on April 7, 1994 in Manila, Philippines, from diabetes complications. He was 70 years old.

== Filmography ==
=== Film ===
Year	Title	Credited as		Role	Note(s)	Ref(s).
Year	Title	Actor	Screenwriter	Role	Note(s)	Ref(s).
1947	Kamay ng Diyos	Yes	No		Extra	
1954	Pedro Penduko	Yes	No			
1955	Anak ni Palaris	Yes	No			
1956	Haring Tulisan	Yes	No			
1959	Pitong Gatang	Yes	Yes			
1960	Materiales Fuertes	Yes	Yes		Cameo	
1961	Noli Me Tángere	Yes	No	Maestro		
1963	Si Darna at ang Impakta	No	Yes			
1963	Ang Tatay Kong Kalbo!	Yes	No		Also associate director	
1964	Lagalag	Yes	No			
1965	Darna at ang Babaing Tuod	Yes	Yes	Gaspar		
1965	Captain Barbell Kontra Captain Bakal	Yes	Yes		Also director	
1966	Tiagong Lundag	Yes	Yes			
1967	Marko Asintado	Yes	Yes			
1967	Wild, Wild Wong	Yes	Yes			
1967	Alamid: Agent 777	Yes	Yes	DND Secretary		
1967	Operation: Impossible	Yes	Yes			
1967	Sibad	Yes	Yes			
1968	Zaragoza	Yes	Yes			
1969	Perlas ng Silangan	Yes	Yes			
1970	Santiago!	Yes	No	Capt. Santos		
1971	Lagablab ng Pag-ibig	Yes	Yes			
1971	Sakim	Yes	Yes			
1971	Beast of the Yellow Night	Yes	No	Hospital doctor		
1972	Magiting at Pusakal	Yes	Yes	Kalayaan		
1972	The Hot Box	Yes	No			
1973	Tanikalang Dugo	Yes	Yes			
1974	Fe, Esperanza, Caridad	Yes	No	Don Benito	"Fe" segment	
1974	Mga Tigre ng Sierra Cruz	Yes	Yes			
1974	Carnival Song	Yes	Yes			
1975	Ang Nobya Kong Sexy	Yes	No			
1976	Nunal sa Tubig	Yes	No	Pedro		
1977	Banta ng Kahapon	Yes	No			
1978	Doble Kara	Yes	Yes			
1980	Aguila	Yes	No	Gen. Caram		
1981	Kamakalawa	Yes	No	Kulai		
1981	Kisapmata	Yes	No	Peping Manalasan		
1982	Desire	Yes	No			
1984	Sister Stella L.	Yes	No			
1987	Hari sa Hari, Lahi sa Lahi	Yes	No			
1987	Huwag Mong Buhayin ang Bangkay	Yes	No	Lucio		
1988	Ang Anino ni Asedillo	Yes	No			
1988	Ang Supremo	Yes	No			
1988	Kumander Dante	Yes	No			
1988	Chinatown: Sa Kuko ng Dragon	Yes	No			
1989	Arrest: Pat. Rizal Alih – Zamboanga Massacre	Yes	No	Mayor Cesar Climaco		
1989	Fight for Us	Yes	No	Monsignor		
1989	Sa Kuko ng Agila	Yes	No	Don Fernando		
1989	Babangon Ako't Dudurugin Kita	Yes	No	Ricardo		
1989	Isang Bala, Isang Buhay	Yes	No	Don Honorio		
1990	Michael and Madonna	Yes	No	Principal		
1990	Pido Dida: Sabay Tayo	Yes	No			
1990	Alyas Pogi: Birador ng Nueva Ecija	Yes	No	Padre Jose		
1991	Alyas Batman en Robin	Yes	No			
1992	Mukhang Bungo: Da Coconut Nut	Yes	No	Jhonny Khadaphi		
1992	Eh, Kasi Bata	Yes	No			
1992	Alyas Joker: Sigue-Sigue 22 Commando	Yes	Yes			
1992	Alyas Pogi 2	Yes	No	Priest		
1993	Lt. Madarang: Iginuhit sa Dugo	Yes	No	Villager		
1994	Bawal Na Gamot	Yes	No			

=== Television ===
Year	Title	Role	Notes
1988	A Dangerous Life	Ferdinand Marcos	Miniseries
1992	Valiente	Damian Valiente	
1992	Lovingly Yours		1 episode
1993	Noli Me Tángere	Kapitan Tiago	Miniseries
