= Mukhang Bungo: Da Coconut Nut =

1992 comedy film starring Redford White

- Official movie poster
- Directed by: Felix E. Dalay
- Screenplay by: Woodrow Serafin; Divino Reyes
- Story by: Felix E. Dalay
- Produced by: Wally Chua; Victor Villegas
- Starring: Redford White; Shiela Ysrael; Willie Revillame; Dindo Arroyo; Berting Labra; Ruben Rustia
- Cinematography: Rey de Leon; Danny Bustos
- Edited by: Renato de Leon
- Music by: Mon Del Rosario
- Production company: Moviestars Production
- Distributed by: Moviestars Production
- Release date: May 14, 1992
- Country: Philippines
- Language: Filipino

Mukhang Bungo: Da Coconut Nut (lit. 'Looks Like a Skull') is a 1992 Philippine action comedy film written and directed by Felix E. Dalay on his directorial debut. The film stars Redford White, Shiela Ysrael, Willie Revillame, Dindo Arroyo, Berting Labra, Ruben Rustia, Gilda Aragon, Ernie Zarate, Moody Diaz, and Cris Daluz. The film's title is a parody of the 1991 film Markang Bungo: The Bobby Ortega Story, while its subtitle is taken from the song of the same name by Smokey Mountain. Produced by Moviestars Production, the film was released on May 14, 1992.

Critic Justino Dormiendo of the Manila Standard gave the film a negative review, criticizing the film's unfunny slapstick comedy and lack of smart satire for the 1992 Philippine election season.

== Plot ==
Boboy Mortega is a stuntman living with his mother and father at the Take It or Leave It Cemetery. After his father is killed by thugs from a drug syndicate for being a police informer, Boboy takes a job as a security guard (colloquially called a "sikyu") and becomes a vigilante. With the help of his fellow policemen and a group of street children, Boboy tries to track down the syndicate as they have taken his father's body.

== Cast ==
- Redford White as Boboy Mortega
- Shiela Ysrael as Miriam Salonga
- Willie Revillame as Danding Mitra
- Dindo Arroyo as Joseph Salvador
- Berting Labra as Doy Ramos
- Ruben Rustia as Jhonny Khadaphi
- Gilda Aragon as Imelda Ortega
- Ernie Zarate as Col. Fidel Estrada
- Moody Diaz as Aling Kikay
- Cris Daluz as Kikoy Ortega
- Sigred Socrates as Nene
- Jefferson Sy as Monching
- Marty Manuel as Jovy
- Renato del Prado as Bukas Kotse Gang member
- Jimmy Reyes as Bukas Kotse Gang member
- Danny Rojo as funeral manager
- Bert Cayanan as Bukas Kotse Gang member
- Pong Pong as Anito
- Turling Pader as Benito
- Ross Rival as Whitey
- Dennis Duque as Blacky
- Vic Belaro as Khadaphi's Bodyguard
- Allan Garcia as Director
- Jake Bais as Lawyer
- Diana Lacson as Complainant
- Josie Tagle as Talent Caretaker
- Albert Garcia as Asst. Caretaker

Phillip Salvador cameos as "the actor".

== Release ==
Mukhang Bungo was released in theaters on May 14, 1992.

=== Critical response ===
Justino Dormiendo of the Manila Standard gave Mukhang Bungo a negative review. He criticized the film's recycled and "mostly unfunny" slapstick comedy, the lack of clever satire for the 1992 Philippine election season, and the absence of "comic charm" among the cast, noting that the latter was usually the case with newer contemporary comedians in the Philippines. Dormiendo was also critical of White being "devoid of a strong comic persona that is most essential to the role", while adding that Berting Labra and Willie Revillame have no chemistry together in playing the patrolmen Ramos and Mitra respectively.
