= Berting Labra =

Filipino actor (1933–2009)

- Born: Roberto S. Labra; April 17, 1933; Manila, Philippine Islands, United States
- Died: February 10, 2009 (aged 75); Pateros, Metro Manila, Philippines
- Occupation: Actor
- Years active: 1945–2009
- Awards: FAMAS Best Supporting Actor; 1964 Lumuluhang Komiko

Berting Labra (born Roberto S. Labra; April 17, 1933 – February 10, 2009) was a Filipino actor. He had roles in comedy, drama, action, and musical movies.

== Personal life and career ==
Labra starred in Apat na Taga in 1953. He was a child star who shared the screen with Fernando Poe Sr. in several films, including Palaboy ng Tadhana, Sagur, Kanto Boy, and Alimudin.

He was only six years old when he made his stage debut. He was discovered by Fernando Poe Sr. when he was looking for a child actor who could sing in movies.

Labra also witnessed the murder of his father, Francisco Labra, former bantamweight and featherweight champion of the Orient, at the hands of Japanese soldiers. "He was tortured," Labra told the Philippine Daily Inquirer in a 2005 interview.

The elder Poe became the ten-year-old's foster father.

Five years after the elder Poe's death, Labra, then a teenager, teamed up with Fernando Poe Jr. in the 1956 box-office hit Lo' Waist Gang, a film that spawned a string of other movies. It resulted in a lifelong friendship with "Da King."

In 1969, Labra and fellow action star Eddie Fernandez were jailed for murder. Labra spent 13 years in Muntinlupa, only to be exonerated by the Supreme Court.

On December 25, 1982, the film The Cute... The Sexy n' The Tiny premiered. Labra played one of the leads.

Labra appeared in the 1991 action film Manong Gang with actor Ramon "Bong" Revilla Jr. alongside Dina Bonevie, Paquito Diaz and Max Alvarado. Labra's last film, the 2007 comedy M.O.N.A.Y ni Mr. Shooli, he co-starred with actor Leo Martinez.

== Death ==
Labra died on February 10, 2009, due to heart attack. He was 75 years old. Labra's remains were buried in the Garden of Memories in Pateros.

== Filmography ==
=== Film ===
Year	Title	Role
1947	Ang Kapilya sa May Daang Bakal	
1948	Forbidden Women	The Sultan
1949	The 13th Sultan	
1950	Beasts of the East	
1956	Lo' Waist Gang	
1957	Kamay ni Cain	
1957	Bakasyon Grande	
1957	Los Lacuacheros	
1957	Lutong Bahay ni Lola Basyang	
1958	Precious My Darling	
1958	Lo' Waist Gang at si Og sa Mindoro	
1960	Lo' Waist Gang Joins the Armed Forces	
1960	Gabi ng Lagim (Segment 4)	
1960	Rancho Grande	
1962	Big Time Berto	Berto
1962	Bulilit Al Capone	Little Alfonso
1962	Ano Ba Choy	
1963	Hugo, the Sidewalk Vendor	Hugo
1963	Sigaw ng Digmaan	
1963	Mga Manugang ni Drakula	
1963	Magandang Bituin	
1963	Dapit-Hapon: Oras ng Pagtutuos	
1963	Alias Golden Boy	
1963	Dakpin si Julian Adornado	
1964	Lumuluhang Komiko	
1965	Scarface at Al Capone: Espiya sa Ginto	
1965	Dandansoy	
1965	DreamGirl	
1968	That Man Mr. Impossible	
1968	PrettyBoy Playboy	
1968	Mister Gimmick	
1968	Isang Libong Mukha	
1968	Hari ng Yabang	
1968	Blackhawk Commandos	
1969	Bino and Clayd	
1969	D' Musical Teenage Idols	
1970	Tell Nora I Love Her	
1970	Munting Santa	
1982	Presidential Pardon	
1982	The Cute ... The Sexy 'n the Tiny	
1983	Kapag Buhay ang Inutang	
1986	Iyo ang Tondo, Kanya ang Cavite	Berto
1987	Vigilante II	
1987	Victor Corpuz	
1987	Lost and Found Command: Rebels Without Because	
1987	Puto	Travolta
1988	The Untouchable Family	
1988	Bobo Cop	
1988	Ompong Galapong: May Ulo, Walang Tapon	
1988	Kumander Bawang: Kalaban ng Mga Aswang	Lolo Ambo
1988	Gawa Na ang Bala Na Papatay sa Iyo	
1989	Tulak ng Bibig, Kabig ng Dibdib	
1989	Salisi Gang	
1989	Bala ... Dapat Kay Cris Cuenca, Public Enemy No.1	
1989	Jones Bridge Massacre (Task Force Clabio)	Hector Villar
1990	Starzan III: The Jungle Triangle	
1990	Twist: Ako si Ikaw, Ikaw si Ako	
1990	Double M	
1990	Feel Na Feel	
1990	Titser's Enemi No. 1	
1990	Bikining Itim	
1990	Karapatan Ko ang Pumatay ... Kapitan Guti	
1990	Pido Dida: Sabay Tayo	
1991	Batas ng .45	Oyong
1991	Juan Tamad at Mister Shooli: Mongolian Barbecue	Gat Uto
1992	Lumayo Ka Man sa Akin	
1992	Bad Boy II	
1992	Alyas Boy Kano	Bernie
1992	Mukhang Bungo: Da Coconut Nut	Doy Ramos
1992	Aswang	Dodoy
1992	Eh, Kasi Bata	
1992	Jaime Labrador: Sakristan Mayor	Estong
1992	Manong Gang	
1992	Lakay	
1992	Andres Manambit	
1993	Sala sa Init, Sala sa Lamig	Miguel
1993	Patapon	Berting
1993	Mario Sandoval	
1993	Makuha Ka sa Tingin (Kung Puwede Lang)	Manong Nonong
1993	Galvez: Hanggang sa Dulo ng Mundo Hahanapin Kita	David
1993	Lt. Madarang: Iginuhit sa Dugo	Sgt. Tiber
1993	Live by the Fist (or American Samurai 2)	Jojo
1993	Manila Boy	
1994	Chickboys	
1995	Minsan Pa: Kahit Konting Pagtingin Part 2	Judge's Clerk
1995	Isang Kahig..Tatlong Tuka (Daddy Ka Na, Mommy Ka Pa)	
1995	Gising Na ... Ang Higanteng Natutulog	
1995	Huwag Mong Isuko ang Laban	
1996	Batang Z	
1996	Adan Lazaro	Kanor
1996	Do Re Mi	Mr. Tolentino
1996	Ang Probinsyano	Titong
1997	SIG .357 Baril Mo ang Papatay Sa Iyo	
1997	Sa Iyo ang Itaas, sa Akin ang Ibaba ... ng Bahay	Tiyo Paeng
1998	Pagbabalik ng Probinsyano	Titong
1998	Squala	
1998	Alyas Boy Tigas: Ang Probinsyanong Wais	
1998	Ginto't Pilak	
1998	Kasal-Kasalan (Sakalan)	
1999	Bayadra Brothers	
1999	Isusumbong Kita sa Tatay Ko...	Mang Cosme
1999	Basta't Ikaw Pa	
2000	Ang Dalubhasa	Pekto
2000	Waray	
2000	Ayos Na ... ang Kasunod	Ka Benny
2000	Sagot Kita: Mula Ulo Hanggang Paa	
2001	Tabi Tabi Po	
2001	Mila	Tiyo Dodoy
2001	Mahal Kita ... Kahit Sino Ka	
2001	Bakit 'Di Totohanin	
2002	Mahal Kita: Final Answer	
2002	Hari ng Selda-Anak ni Baby Ama 2	
2002	Sana Totoo Na	
2002	Forevermore	
2002	Sugat, Walang Paghilom	Tata Isyo
2002	Tukaan	Lolo Gorio
2003	Pinay Pie	Erning
2006	Umaaraw, Umuulan	
2007	M.O.N.A.Y. (Misteyks Obda Neyson Adres Yata) ni Mr. Shooli	

=== Television ===
Year	Title	Role
1967	The Longest Hundred Miles	Pedro
1998–2001	Richard Loves Lucy	Mang Berting
2001	Ipaglaban Mo: Walang-Wala Na, Nawalan Pa!	Mang Kanor
2001	Eto Na Ang Susunod Na Kabanata	Domeng
2001–2002	Pangako Sa 'Yo	Pepe
2002–2003	Kay Tagal Kang Hinintay	Mario

== Awards ==
- 1962 FAMAS BEST ACTOR - Ano Ba Choy?
- 1964 FAMAS SUPPORTING ACTOR - Lumuluhang Komiko

== Trivia ==
- Fernando Poe, Jr. once stated that "Berting was the greatest Filipino actor of all time."
- He was named Mickey Rooney and Bobby Breen of the Philippines, the Filipino version of Hollywood Child Wonders in the 1940s.
