= Renato del Prado =

Filipino actor (1940–2013)

- Born: Renato Natividad Mateo; January 26, 1940; Manila, Philippines
- Died: November 1, 2013 (aged 73); Chula Vista, California, United States
- Other names: Guido (Annaliza), Tata Peping (Valiente), Ka Rene (Friends and relatives)
- Occupation: Actor
- Years active: 1964–2005
- Children: 9 (including Janus)

Renato del Prado (January 26, 1940 – November 1, 2013) was a Filipino film actor.

== Early life ==
Born Renato Natividad-Mateo on January 26, 1940 in Manila.

== Personal life ==
He was married with 6 children. His youngest son, Janus is also both a film and television actor.

== Career ==
Renato Del Prado was discovered by Sampaguita producer Jose Vera-Perez in the 1960s.

Among his films were Tansan vs. Tarsan with Dolphy, Ang Mahiwagang Mundo ni Lola Sinderella with Amalia Fuentes and My Beloved with Nora Aunor. The older Del Prado was best known for his role as Guido in the GMA Network soap Anna Liza in the 1980s. His last film was Lapu-Lapu, which starred Lito Lapid in 2002.

== Filmography ==
=== Actor ===
- 1964 Umibig Ay Di Biro
- 1964 From Tokyo with Love
- 1964 Kumander Judo
- 1964 Anak ni Kamagong
- 1965 Isinulat sa Dugo
- 1965 Hamon sa Kampeon
- 1965 Walis ni Tenteng
- 1965 Iginuhit ng Tadhana: The Ferdinand E. Marcos Story
- 1965 Magnificent Bakya
- 1966 O!... Kay laking eskandalo!
- 1966 Mga Pag-ibig ni Christine
- 1967 Special Forces
- 1967 Philcag in Vietnam
- 1967 Double Date
- 1967 7 Bullets for Gringo
- 1967 Sino ang Dapat Sisihin?
- 1967 The Son of Dyango Meets Dorango Kid
- 1967 Hammerhead
- 1968 Quinto de Alas
- 1968 Pitong Krus ng Isang Ina
- 1968 Mga Tigre sa Looban
- 1968 Magic Guitar
- 1968 Dalawang Mukha ng Anghel
- 1969 Kababalaghan
- 1969 Si Darna at ang Planetman
- 1970 Gutom
- 1970 Master Stuntman
- 1970 Dream of Jeanne
- 1970 Munting Santa
- 1970 The Bold and the Beauties
- 1970 Silang Tatlo
- 1970 Alamo Scouts
- 1970 Mga Lihim ni Magdalena
- 1970 My Dearest Mama
- 1970 My Beloved
- 1971 Jezebel
- 1971 Pigilin Mo ang Umaga
- 1971 Bawat Saglit... Kaligayahan
- 1971 Init sa Magdamag
- 1971 Kababalaghan
- 1971 Sophia
- 1971 Nagbagong Landas
- 1971 Sino...?
- 1971 Racquel
- 1971 She Walked by Night
- 1972 Isla de Toro
- 1972 Tomas Brusko
- 1972 Banal na sandata
- 1972 Kung matapang ka!
- 1972 Roulette
- 1972 Jungle Fighters
- 1972 Pinokyo en Little Snow White
- 1972 Apat sa silya elektrika
- 1972 Naku Poooo!
- 1973 Prinsipe Abante
- 1974 Shazam Boom
- 1974 Ulong Pugot... naglalagot!
- 1974 Hotline
- 1974 Kapitan Eddie Set
- 1976 Bergado, Terror of Cavite
- 1976 Type na Type Kita
- 1976 Ang Lihim ni Rosa Henson sa Buhay ni Kumander Lawin
- 1976 Bitayin si... Baby Ama!
- 1977 Gulapa
- 1977 Mr. Wong and the Bionic Girls
- 1977 Tutol ang Lupa sa Patak ng Ulan
- 1978 Flordeluna - Eric
- 1978 Malabanan
- 1978 Salonga
- 1979 Tatay na barok
- 1980 Anna Liza - Guido
- 1980 Alyas Tiagong Lundag
- 1981 Takbo... Peter... Takbo!
- 1981 Hari ng Stunt
- 1981 Lukso ng Dugo
- 1981 Boni & Klayd
- 1981 Iligpit: Pepe Magtanggol
- 1981 Labanang Lalaki
- 1981 Tacio
- 1982 Stepanio
- 1982 Get My Son Dead or Alive - Ka Rodrigo
- 1982 Daniel Bartolo ng Sapang Bato
- 1982 The Victim
- 1982 Tokwa't Baboy
- 1982 Isaac... Dugo ni Abraham - Digo
- 1983 E.T. Is Estong Tutong - Nato
- 1983 Aking prince charming
- 1983 Gamu-gamo sa Pugad Lawin - Rufo
- 1983 To Love Again
- 1983 Sgt. Maximo Velayo: Trigger ng mga Kumander
- 1983 Kunin Mo ang Ulo ni Magtanggol
- 1983 Estong Tutong: Ikalawang Yugto - Nato
- 1984 Nardong Putik (Kilabot ng Cavite) Version II
- 1984 Minanong Magat
- 1984 Condemned - Rapist
- 1984 Muntinlupa
- 1984 Digmaan sa Pagitan ng Lagit at Lupa
- 1984 Death Raiders
- 1985 Rambuto
- 1985 Isang Platitong Mani (as Renato Guido Del Prado)
- 1985 Ben Tumbling: A People's Journal Story - Tinyente
- 1985 Bilang Na ang Oras Mo
- 1985 Manila Gang War
- 1985 Isa-isa Lang! - Sgt. Vera Cruz (uncredited)
- 1985 White Slavery
- 1985 Celeste Gang
- 1985 Anak ng Tondo - Binong Bulol
- 1985 Jandro Nakpil: Halang ang Kaluluwa
- 1985 High Blood
- 1985 Ben Zapanta ... Ilibing ng Buhay?
- 1985 Paradise Inn
- 1985 Isusumpa Mo ang Araw Nang Isilang Ka
- 1986 Iyo ang Tondo, Kanya ang Cavite - Hildo
- 1986 Isa Lang ang Dapat Mabuhay
- 1986 Isang Kumot Tatlong Unan
- 1986 Anomalya ni Andres de Saya
- 1986 Muslim .357
- 1986 Agaw Armas
- 1986 Pepe Saclao: Public Enemy No. 1 - Simon
- 1986 Blood War
- 1986 Jailbreak 1958
- 1986 Durugin ang Kutsng Buto
- 1986 Beloy Montemayor
- 1987 Ultimatum: Ceasefire!
- 1987 Lost and Found Command: Rebels Without Because - Sur Dimawari
- 1987 Family Tree - Gambling Lord
- 1987 Balandra Crossing
- 1987 Nonoy Garote and the Sidekicks
- 1987 Action Is Not Missing
- 1988 Dongalo Massacre
- 1988 Target... Maganto
- 1988 Gorio Punasan, Rebel Driver
- 1988 Joaquin Burdado
- 1988 Puso sa Puso
- 1988 Boy Negro - Tiyo Maning
- 1988 Kambal Na Kamao: Madugong Engkwentro
- 1988 Sgt. Ernesto 'Boy' Ybañez: Tirtir Gang - Tata
- 1988 Arturo Lualhati
- 1988 Iyo ang Batas, Akin ang Katarungan - Selmo
- 1988 Hamunin ang Bukas...
- 1988 Pepeng Kuryente: Man with a Thousand Volts - Siso
- 1988 Chinatown: Sa Kuko ng Dragon
- 1988 Kumander Anting-Anting
- 1988 Code Name: Black & White
- 1989 Alex Boncayao Brigade: The Liquidation Arm of the NPA
- 1989 Capt. Jaylo: Batas sa Batas
- 1989 Eagle Squad
- 1989 Sgt. Melgar - Esteng
- 1989 Delima Gang - Alfredo
- 1989 Bawat Patak ... Dugong Pilipino
- 1989 Gawa Na ang Bala para sa Akin - Capt. Puten
- 1989 Jones Bridge Massacre (Task Force Clabio)
- 1989 Isang Bala, Isang Buhay
- 1989 Target... Police General: Major General Alfredo Lim Story
- 1990 Urbanito Dizon: The Most Notorious Gangster in Luzon - Gary
- 1990 Kapag Wala Nang Batas
- 1990 Karapatan Ko ang Pumatay! -Kapitan Guti
- 1990 Naughty Boys
- 1990 Apoy sa Lupang Hinirang
- 1990 Alyas Pogi: Birador ng Nueva Ecija - Guido
- 1990 Kaaway ng Batas - Don Pedro's Man
- 1990 May Araw Ka Rin Bagallon
- 1990 Lover's Delight
- 1990 Valiente
- 1991 Pretty Boy Hoodlum
- 1991 Markang Bungo: The Bobby Ortega Story
- 1991 Manong Gang - Right-hand man of Andro
- 1991 Mabuting Kaibigan, Masamang Kaaway - Dodong
- 1991 Kidlat ng Maynila: Joe Pring 2 - Paeng
- 1991 Dinampot Ka Lang sa Putik
- 1991 Medal of Valor: Lt. Jack Moreno - Habang Nasusugatan Lalong Tumatapang
- 1991 Batas ng .45 - Butch
- 1992 Pangako Sa'yo
- 1992 Dito sa Pitong Gatang
- 1992 Mukhang Bungo: Da Coconut Nut
- 1992 Kamay ni Cain
- 1992 Lucio Margallo - Pedring
- 1992 Magdaleno Orbos: Sa Kuko ng Mga Lawin
- 1992 Totoy Guwapo: Alyas Kanto Boy - Stepfather
- 1992 Rosang Tatoo
- 1992 Lacson, Batas ng Navotas
- 1992 Kahit Buhay Ko...
- 1992 Amang Capulong - Anak ng Tondo II
- 1992 Anak ng Dagat
- 1993 Patapon
- 1993 The Vizconde Massacre Story (God Help Us!)
- 1993 Manila Boy - Alvarez Henchman
- 1993 The Myrna Diones Story (Lord, Have Mercy!)
- 1993 Silang Mga Sisiw sa Lansangan
- 1993 Tumbasan Mo ng Buhay
- 1994 Talahib at Rosas
- 1994 Mayor Cesar Climaco
- 1994 Ka Hector - Ka Enchong
- 1994 Baby Paterno (Dugong Pulis)
- 1994 Ismael Zacarias - Pol
- 1994 Lagalag: The Eddie Fernandez Story - Prison Guard
- 1994 Nagkataon... Nagkatagpo - Guzman's Man
- 1994 Iukit Mo sa Bala! - Julian
- 1994 Ang Ika-labing Isang Utos: Mahalin Mo, Asawa Mo - Turing
- 1995 Matinik Na Kalaban
- 1995 Costales - Kapitan
- 1995 I Love You Sabado!!! - Syndicate men
- 1995 Silakbo - Mang Pete
- 1996 Kristo - Pariseo
- 1996 Huwag Mong Isuko ang Laban
- 1996 Hagedorn
- 1996 Lahar
- 1996 Masamang Damo
- 1996 May Nagmamahal Sa'yo
- 1997 Walang Dayaan Akin ang Malaki
- 1997 Buhay Mo'y Buhay Ko Rin
- 1997 Boy Chico: Hulihin si Ben Tumbling
- 1997 Casamento de Conveniência - Ambo
- 1997 Ipaglaban Mo II: The movie - Tiyo Pilong (episode 1)
- 1997 Epimaco Velasco: NBI - Kidnapper
- 1997 Ang Probinsyano - Natong Luga
- 1998 Pagbabalik ng Probinsyano - Natong Luga
- 1998 My Guardian Debil - Mang Pete
- 1998 Berdugo - Mang Rene
- 1999 Bayad Puri
- 2000 Leon ng Maynila, Lt. Col. Romeo Maganto
- 2001 Mahal Kita... Kahit Sino Ka Pa!
- 2001 Radyo - Policeman
- 2002 Bugso (TV Movie)
- 2002 Forevermore - Pedro
- 2002 Hibla
- 2002 Lapu-Lapu - Itong
- 2002 Habang Kapiling Ka - Nanding (GMA Network) Television

== Death ==
Del Prado died on November 1, 2013, in California due to colon cancer, his daughter, entertainment reporter Pilar Mateo, told the Inquirer. He was 73. Del Prado, who migrated to the United States in 2005, will be buried at Glen Abbey Memorial Park this week, said Mateo.
