= Gilda Olvidado =

Filipino writer (born 1957)

Gilda Olvidado-Marcelino (born August 9, 1957 in Cebu City, Cebu) is a Filipina television writer and melodrama novelist. Several of her comic serials have been adapted into films by VIVA Films, and were also remade for television through GMA Network's Sine Novela.

== Family ==
Olvidado's parents are Gregorio Tan and Guarda Olvidado. She lived and received early education in Maranding, Lanao del Norte, Northern Mindanao. Olvidado is married to Ruben Marcelino, a former editor-in-chief of the Atlas Publishing Company, with whom she has two children.

== Education ==
She was a student of Chemistry at Adamson University. For two years, she took units of Journalism at the Manuel L. Quezon University.

== Influences ==
Olvidado had been influenced by Carlo J. Caparas, particularly in the field of writing for Philippine comics.

== Career ==
=== Philippine comics ===
Olvidado's first serial in Philippine comics was Cha Lee's Angels, a comedy. Her second serial was Kapag Puso ang Nagsasakdal, a drama. Olvidado decided to focus on writing drama in Philippine comics after the satisfactory acceptance of Kapag Puso ang Nagsasakdal by readers. Olvidado authored other Philippine comics novels such as Sinasamba Kita (1982), Dapat Ka Bang Mahalin? (1984), Kung Mahawi Man Ang Ulap (1984), Ina, Kasusuklaman Ba Kita? (1985), Huwag Mo Kaming Isumpa (1986), Huwag Mong Itanong Kung Bakit (1986), Pinulot Ka Lang sa Lupa (1987), Saan Nagtatago ang Pag-ibig (1987), Magkano ang Iyong Dangal (1988), and Babangon Ako at Dudurgin Kita (1989). Olvidado wrote the Philippine comics novels entitled Mirasol for Gwapo Komiks, Kumurap ang Buwan for Klasik Komiks, and The Babe and the Beast for Super Funny Komix.

=== Paperbacks ===
She proceeded to authoring Tagalog romance paperbacks for Valentine Romances, Twin Hearts, and Gemini pocketbooks. In 1993, Olvidado published her own line of Tagalog pocketbook novels.

=== Newspaper column ===
Olvidado wrote in the erotica genre in the Brilgint section of the tabloid newspaper Abante.

=== Screenplays ===
Olvidado wrote the screenplays for Filipino films such as Dapat Ka Bang Mahalin? (1984), Saan Nagtatago ang Pag-ibig? (1987), and Babangon Ako't Dudurugin Kita (1989).

=== Television ===
Olvidado co-wrote the Filipino telenovelas for Sinasamba Kita (2007), Kung Mahawi Man ang Ulap (2007), Babangon Ako’t Dudurugin Kita (2008) and Dapat Ka Bang Mahalin (2009). She co-wrote the melodrama television shows such as My Only Love (2007-2008) and Kaputol ng Isang Awit (2008). Olvidado is currently a resident writer of GMA Network.

=== Radio ===
Olvidado wrote for the radio serial Dahlia aired over the DWWW radio station.

== Awards ==
Olvidado was awarded Best Story for the film Saan Nagtatago ang Pag-ibig during the 36th FAMAS Awards ceremonies in 1987. FAMAS nominated her for Best Story for the movies entitled Sinasamba Kita (1982), Kung Mahawi Man ang Ulap (1984), at Huwag Mong Itanong Kung Bakit (1988).

== Filmography ==
=== Film ===
Year	Title	Writer	Note(s)	Ref(s).
1982	Sinasamba Kita	Story	Based on her comic serial in Tagalog Klasiks	
1984	Kung Mahawi Man ang Ulap	Story	Based on her comic serial in Espesyal Komiks	
1984	Dapat Ka Bang Mahalin?	Story	Based on her comic serial in Pilipino Komiks	
1985	Sugat sa Dangal	Story	Based on her comic serial in Extra Special Komiks	
1985	Ina, Kasusuklaman Ba Kita?	Story	Based on her comic serial in Pilipino Komiks	
1985	Kailan Sasabihing Mahal Kita?	Story	Based on her comic serial in Pilipino Komiks	
1986	Huwag Mo Kaming Isumpa!	Story	Based on her comic serial in Darna Komiks	
1987	Saan Nagtatago ang Pag-Ibig	Story	Based on her comic serial in Pogi Komiks	
1987	Pinulot Ka Lang sa Lupa	Story	Based on her comic serial in King Komiks	
1987	Walang Karugtong ang Nakaraan	Story	Based on her comic serial in TSS Komiks	
1988	Huwag Mong Itanong Kung Bakit	Story	Based on her comic serial in Espesyal Komiks	
1988	Magkano ang Iyong Dangal?	Story	Based on her comic serial in Pilipino Komiks	
1989	Kung Kasalanan Man	Story	Based on her comic serial in Darna Komiks	
1989	Babangon Ako't Dudurugin Kita	Story	Based on her comic serial in TSS Komiks	
1990	Tayo Na sa Dilim	Story	Based on her comic serial in Espesyal Komiks	
1990	Bakit Kay Tagal ng Sandali?	Story	Based on her comic serial in Pilipino Komiks	

=== Television ===
==== As writer ====
Year	Title	Note(s)
2007	Sinasamba Kita	Co-writer, based on her novel
2007	Kung Mahawi Man ang Ulap	Co-writer, based on her novel
2007–2008	My Only Love	Co-writer
2008	Kaputol ng Isang Awit	Co-writer
2008	Babangon Ako't Dudurugin Kita	Co-writer, based on her novel
2009	Dapat Ka Bang Mahalin?	Co-writer, based on her novel
2009	Ina, Kasusuklaman Ba Kita?	Based on her novel
2010	Magkano ang Iyong Dangal?	Based on her novel
2012	Temptation of Wife	Brainstormer, also co-producer
2013–2014	Adarna	Brainstormer; 80 episodes
2014	Kambal Sirena	Brainstormer; 80 episodes
2014–2016	The Half Sisters	Writer; credited as Gilda Olvidado-Marcelino; 418 episodes
2014–2015	Strawberry Lane	Original concept, writer 80 episodes
2014–2015	Ang Lihim ni Annasandra	Brainstormer; credited as Gilda Olvidado-Marcelino; 88 episodes
2017	Pinulot Ka Lang sa Lupa	Developer

== See also ==
- Lualhati Bautista
