= Batas ng .45 =

1991 action film by Ronwaldo Reyes

- Theatrical release poster
- Directed by: Ronwaldo Reyes
- Screenplay by: Pablo S. Gomez; Erwin Castillo; Chris Michelena
- Story by: Erwin Castillo; Chris Michelena
- Produced by: Jaime M. Garcia
- Starring: Fernando Poe Jr.
- Cinematography: Ver Reyes
- Edited by: Augusto Salvador
- Music by: Jaime Fabregas
- Production company: Chiba Far East Film International
- Distributed by: Chiba Far East Film International
- Release date: May 30, 1991
- Running time: 121 minutes
- Country: Philippines
- Language: Filipino

Batas ng .45 (lit. 'Law of the .45') is a 1991 Filipino action film directed by Fernando Poe Jr. (under the pseudonym Ronwaldo Reyes), who also stars in the film, from a screenplay written by Pablo S. Gomez, Erwin Castillo, and Chris Michelena, with the latter two writers co-wrote the story. Co-starring Timmy Cruz, Paquito Diaz, Charlie Davao, R.R. Herrera, and Tito Arevalo, the story follows a former police officer who, after being dishonorably discharged under unsubstantiated circumstances, orchestrates a campaign of retribution against the officials responsible for the conspiracy in an effort to prove his innocence.

Produced and distributed by Chiba Far East Film International, the film was theatrically released on May 30, 1991.

== Cast ==
- Fernando Poe Jr. as PCpt. Celso Magsalin
- Timmy Cruz as Gina de Jesus
- Paquito Diaz as PMaj. Caringal's Righthand Man
- Charlie Davao PMaj. Caringal
- R.R. Herrera as Rico Magsalin
- Tito Arevalo as PCol. Magsalin
- Kevin Delgado as Alex Santos
- Romeo Rivera as Fr. Morgan/Jess Serrano
- Berting Labra as Oyong
- Bert Olivar as Sarge
- Renato del Prado as Butch
- Danny Riel as Adriano Ramirez
- Vic Varrion
- Rene Hawkins
- Jimmy Reyes
- Bebeng Amora
- Ernie David
- Eddie Tuazon

== Production ==
Batas ng .45 was produced by Chiba Far East Film International, founded by the film's executive producer, Jaime M. Garcia, a former stuntman. Timmy Cruz, who was under a contract with Viva Films at the time, was allowed by its top executive, Vic R. Del Rosario Jr., to be cast in the lead female role.
