= Blood Oath =

Blood Oath may refer to:

== Arts and entertainment ==
- Blood Oath (album), a 2009 album by Suffocation
- Blood Oath (Farnsworth novel), 2010
- Blood Oath (film), a 1990 Australian film
- "Blood Oath" (Star Trek: Deep Space Nine), a 1994 television episode
- Blood Oath, a 1982 novel by David Morrell (writer)
- Blood Oath, a fictional film in the 2002 video game Stuntman

== Oaths ==
- A ritual performed between blood brothers
- Blood oath (Hungarians), a pact between the leaders of the seven Hungarian tribes
- Blood seal oath, a Japanese blood oath
- Penalty (Mormonism), called a "blood oath" by critics, a Latter Day Saint punishment for breaking an oath of secrecy after receiving the Nauvoo endowment ceremony

== See also ==
- Blood compact (disambiguation)
- Blood Pact (disambiguation)
- Blood Promise (disambiguation)
