= Walang Karugtong ang Nakaraan =

1987 Filipino romantic drama film

- Official movie poster
- Directed by: Leroy Salvador
- Written by: Rene O. Villanueva; Raquel Villavicencio
- Based on: Walang Karugtong ang Nakaraan by Gilda Olvidado
- Produced by: Ramon Salvador
- Starring: Christopher de Leon; Sharon Cuneta
- Cinematography: Fortunato C. Bernardo
- Edited by: Ike Jarlego Jr.
- Music by: George Canseco
- Production company: Viva Films
- Distributed by: Viva Films
- Release date: November 26, 1987
- Country: Philippines
- Language: Filipino

Walang Karugtong ang Nakaraan (lit. 'Nothing Follows the Past') is a 1987 Filipino drama film directed by Leroy Salvador and written by Rene O. Villanueva and Raquel Villavicencio. Based on the TSS Komiks "komik" of the same name by Gilda Olvidado, it stars Christopher de Leon, Sharon Cuneta, Carmi Martin, Chanda Romero, Ronaldo Valdez, Tommy Abuel, Ali Sotto and Katrin Gonzales.

Produced and distributed by Viva Films, the film was theatrically released on November 26, 1987.

== Plot ==
The story revolves around Ronic (Christopher de Leon) and Malou (Sharon Cuneta), who are currently facing tests in life. Ronic's wife died, and he was depressed and down and wanted to move on, while Malou's mother is suffering from a disease that pushed her to work as a waitress in a club. Ronic meets Malou and sees a lot of resemblance to his deceased wife, Rossana.

== Cast ==
Main cast

- Christopher de Leon as Ronic
- Sharon Cuneta as Malou

Supporting cast

- Carmi Martin as Lucy
- Chanda Romero as Tess
- Ronaldo Valdez as Mel
- Tommy Abuel as Gil
- Katrina Gonzales as Gretchen
- Ali Sotto as Sandra
- Marita Zobel as Malou's mother
- Johnny Wilson as Ronic's father
- Naty Santiago as Ronic's mother
- Vangie Labalan as Didang
- Bella Flores as club manager
- Manny Castañeda as couturier / dressmaker
- Club customers
  - Polly Cadsawan
  - Vic Belaro
  - Ronnie Jurado
  - Albert Garcia
- Club hostess
  - Rosset Bustos
  - Liza Mojica
  - Jessica Damondamon
- Gil's office secretaries
  - Abegail Morales
  - Gladys Cruz
- Pilar de Leon as store owner
- Baby Bayor as house tenant
- Arnie Torres as Malou's mother's nurse
- Lorena Bote as emergency nurse I
- Ronic's housemaids
  - Irene Sarmiento
  - Asuncion Bation
- Riza Navarro as typing class teacher
- James Cooper as Malou's wedding hairdresser
- Josie Tagle as talent promotion

== Production ==
Director Leroy Salvador was accused of assaulting an employee of Bulacan Gardens in Quezon City during production of the film.

== Release ==
Walang Karugtong ang Nakaraan was released on November 26, 1987.
