= Sablay Ka Na... Pasaway Ka Pa... =

Philippine romantic comedy film

- Directed by: Willy Milan
- Written by: Marlon Rivero
- Produced by: Benjamin G. Yalung
- Starring: Mikey Arroyo; Ethel Booba; Katrina Halili
- Cinematography: Val Dauz
- Edited by: Randy Brien
- Music by: Eazer Pastor
- Production company: Cine Suerte
- Distributed by: Cine Suerte
- Release date: October 19, 2005
- Running time: 102 minutes
- Country: Philippines
- Language: Filipino

Sablay Ka Na... Pasaway Ka Pa... (lit. 'You're a Failure... You're also Naughty...') is a 2005 Philippine romantic comedy film directed by Willy Milan. The film stars Mikey Arroyo, Ethel Booba and Katrina Halili.

== Cast ==
- Mikey Arroyo as Eric
- Ethel Booba as Becky
- Katrina Halili as Raven
- Ana Leah Javier as Nicole
- Al Tantay as Don Ruben
- Salbakuta as Buraot Boys
- Pekto as Anton
- John Apacible as Chino
- Renee Summer as Yayo
- Gerardo Espina Jr. as Rax
- Manjo del Mundo as Joman
- Levi Ignacio as Jet Li
- Chino Pamintuan as Benjo
- Inday Garutay as Melay
- Winfa Panganiban as Jenny
- Christian Lorenzo as Lester
- Jay Perillo as Jason
- D'Pards as Lupin Boys

== Release ==
The film premiered at the gym of the Naval Institute of Technology on July 3, 2005. The film was released nationwide on October 19, 2005.
