= Timmy Cruz =

Filipina singer and movie actress

- Born: Fatima Angelica Lontoc Cruz; December 7, 1961 (age 64); Nevada, United States
- Occupations: Actress, singer, broadcast journalist
- Years active: 1986–2016, 2024–present
- Agents: GMA Artist Center; Star Magic; Artists Circle by Rams David

Fatima Angelica Lontoc Cruz, also known by her screen name Timmy Cruz, is a Filipina singer and movie actress.

== Career ==
Cruz became popular in the 1980s for her songs "Boy", "Joke Lang" and "Tingin".

She also starred in films produced by Viva Films, which she was under a contract with, including Kumander Bawang: Kalaban ng Mga Aswang (1988), Kung Kasalanan Man (1989), Pangarap Na Ginto (1990), Di Na Natuto (1993) and The Sarah Balabagan Story (1997). She played as the leading lady of Joey de Leon in Sheman: Mistress of the Universe, Eddie Garcia in Alfredo Lim: Batas ng Maynila and Fernando Poe Jr. in Batas ng .45.

She appeared in the GMA Network television series Villa Quintana (1995), Halik sa Apoy (1998), and Sinner or Saint (2011). She appeared also in ABS-CBN TV series Lobo (2008), Love Is Only in the Movies (2010), and Kapitan Inggo (2011).

Cruz has turned into a Gospel singer under Praise Music. Cruz was awarded the 2009 Fr. Neri Satur Environmental Heroism Award.

In her comeback, she released Christmas music "All I Want is You" airing on streaming media under her new talent agent, Artists Circle founded on 2012 by Rams David. After a 9 year hiatus from her last project in GMA Network’s drama series Once Again, Cruz stars in the crime drama series, Widows’ War and portrays the role of Mercy Castillo. This is Cruz's comeback project.

== Personal life ==
Her father is Atty. Angel Cruz and mother is Lourdes Lontok, businesswoman and civic leader. She finished her degree in Business Administration at University of the Philippines, and degrees in Banking and Finance at the University of San Francisco in California, USA.

In 2016, at her Tagaytay house, she discovered a peppercorn size mass and after biopsy she had a breast implant following a one breast mastectomy.

== Filmography ==
=== Television ===
Year	Title	Role
1990	Ibong Maya	
1990–1992	Headline Trese	Herself / News Anchor
1993–1995	Balitang Balita	Herself / News Anchor
1994–1997	Villa Quintana	Elena Malvar
1997	Bayani	Josefa Llanes Escoda
1998–1999	Halik sa Apoy	Toyang
2000	Marinella	Dra. Anna Rivera / Susana Villareal
2000	Maalaala Mo Kaya: Tulay	Guest Role
2001	Sa Puso Ko Iingatan Ka	Dra. Enriquez
2008	Maalaala Mo Kaya: Notebook	Aming's Aunt
2008	Lobo	Ylvana Zaragoza
2010	Precious Hearts Romances Presents: Love Is Only in the Movies	Alejandra
2011	Agimat: Ang Mga Alamat ni Ramon Revilla: Kapitan Inggo	Morgana Salazar
2011	Sinner or Saint	Sally
2011–2012	Daldalita	Lupe
2012	Faithfully	Gloria Mariano
2013	Magpakailanman: Ligaw Na diyosa: The Katrina Halili Story	Malou
2013	Unforgettable	Raymunda "Munding" Manalastas
2013–2014	Adarna	Calisay
2015	My Faithful Husband	Elvie
2016	Once Again	Nancy Sanchez
2024–2025	Widows' War	Mercy Castillo

=== Film ===
Year	Title	Role
1988	Kumander Bawang: Kalaban ng Mga Aswang	Carmen
1988	Sheman: Mistress of the Universe	Ligaya
1989	M&M, The Incredible Twins	
1989	Kung Kasalanan Man	Josephine "Jo" Quintos
1990	Pangarap Na Ginto	Sandy
1990	Lumaban Ka... Sagot Kita	
1991	Batas ng .45	Gina de Jesus
1993	Di Na Natuto (Sorry Na, Puwede Ba?)	Paula
1995	Alfredo Lim: Batas ng Maynila	Racquel
2011	My Neighbor's Wife	Jasmine's Mom
2013	The Bride and the Lover	Baby Montes

== Discography ==
- Timmy Cruz (1987, Blackgold Records)
- Take Care (1988, Blackgold Records)
- Kakaiba (1990, Blackgold Records)
- Magka-ibigan (1992, Blackgold Records)
- UpTimmystic (Praise Records)
- In-Tim-8 (2010, Star Records)
