= A.B. Normal College: Todo Na 'Yan! Kulang Pa 'Yun! =

- Official movie poster
- Directed by: Al Tantay
- Written by: Al Tantay; Sherwin Buenvenida; Rolf Mahilom
- Produced by: Vincent del Rosario III; Veronique del Rosario-Corpus
- Starring: Andrew E.; Ogie Alcasid; Mikey Arroyo
- Cinematography: Jun Pereira
- Edited by: Danny Gloria
- Music by: Elhmir Saison
- Production company: Viva Films
- Distributed by: Viva Films
- Release date: February 12, 2003
- Running time: 115 minutes
- Country: Philippines
- Language: Filipino

A.B. Normal College: Todo Na 'Yan! Kulang Pa 'Yun! (lit. 'That's too much! That there's not enough!') is a 2003 Philippine comedy film co-written and directed by Al Tantay. The film stars Andrew E., Ogie Alcasid and Mikey Arroyo.

The film is streaming online on YouTube.

== Plot ==
Andres, Dominic, and Miguel are college students at Cayetano Curimao College, which faces imminent closure due to severe financial difficulties and a decline in moral standards. In a desperate attempt to raise funds, the faculty tasks them with organizing an alumni homecoming event. However, the event falls flat as most returning alumni have failed to achieve significant accomplishments, rendering the fundraising efforts ineffective. Determined to save their beloved school, the trio decides to enter a televised quiz show, through the help of one of their teachers, Miss Yulo, aiming to win the jackpot prize to clear the institution's debts.

As they travel to the studio, they uncover a sinister plot: someone has planted a bomb under their bus, intending to sabotage their mission. With quick thinking and teamwork, they manage to deactivate the bomb, arriving at the studio just in time. Against all odds, Andres, Dominic, and Miguel win the quiz show, securing the funds needed to rescue their college from financial ruin and restore its reputation.

== Cast ==
- Andrew E. as Andres
- Ogie Alcasid as Dominic
- Mikey Arroyo as Miguel
- Rufa Mae Quinto as Miss Yulo
- Patricia Javier as Pao
- Jen Rosendahl as Gregoria
- Rico J. Puno as Piolo
- Caloy Alde as Dean Jerico
- Lou Veloso as Carlos
- Manjo Del Mundo as Matthew
- Alicia Lane as Dra. Fortune
- Don Pepot as Esteban
- Whitney Tyson as Monang
- Romy Santos as Principal
- Cloyd Robinson as Charlie
- Boy Alano as Dominic's Father
- Elizabeth Oropesa as Miguel's Mother
- Al Tantay as Mrs. Salazar's Driver
- Cita Astals as Sarso's Mother
- Jose "Kaka" Balagtas as Drug Lord
- Anthony Suntay as Quiz Show Host
- Dan Salamante as Quiz Show Floor director
- Kristine Jaca as Pamela
- Chino Pamintuan as Sarso
- Joji dela Paz as Mang Ruffy
- Rey Solo as Bus Driver
- Nonoy De Guzman as Prisoner Alumni
- Salbakuta as Alpha Kappa fraternity members
- G-Girls as Lactasyd Ma Rho fraternity members
- Razzamanazz as students
- Doming Olivar as Security Guard
- Alexis Lagdameo as Bading
- Celestina Salazar as Mrs. Salazar

== Production ==
Production of the film took 15 days in November 2002. The film was slated to be released in January the following year, but was later moved to a month later.
