= Alyas Pogi 2 =

Philippine action film

- Directed by: Toto Natividad
- Written by: Jun Lawas; Amado Lacuesta
- Produced by: Wally Chua; Victor Villegas
- Starring: Ramon "Bong" Revilla Jr.
- Cinematography: Rey Lapid; Edmund Cupcupin
- Edited by: Ruben Natividad
- Music by: Mon del Rosario
- Production company: Moviestars Production
- Distributed by: Moviestars Production
- Release date: August 26, 1992
- Running time: 110 minutes
- Country: Philippines
- Language: Filipino

Alyas Pogi 2 (lit. 'Alias Handsome 2') is a 1992 Filipino action film directed by Toto Natividad. Ramon "Bong" Revilla Jr. reprises his role as the titular policeman. It is the sequel to the 1990 film Alyas Pogi: Birador ng Nueva Ecija. Produced by Moviestars Production, the film was released on August 26, 1992.

Critic Justino Dormiendo of the Manila Standard gave the film a severely negative review for its dialogue and sadistic violence, describing it as a "theater of cruelty." A sequel, Alyas Pogi: Ang Pagbabalik, was released in 1999.

The film is streaming online on YouTube.

== Cast ==
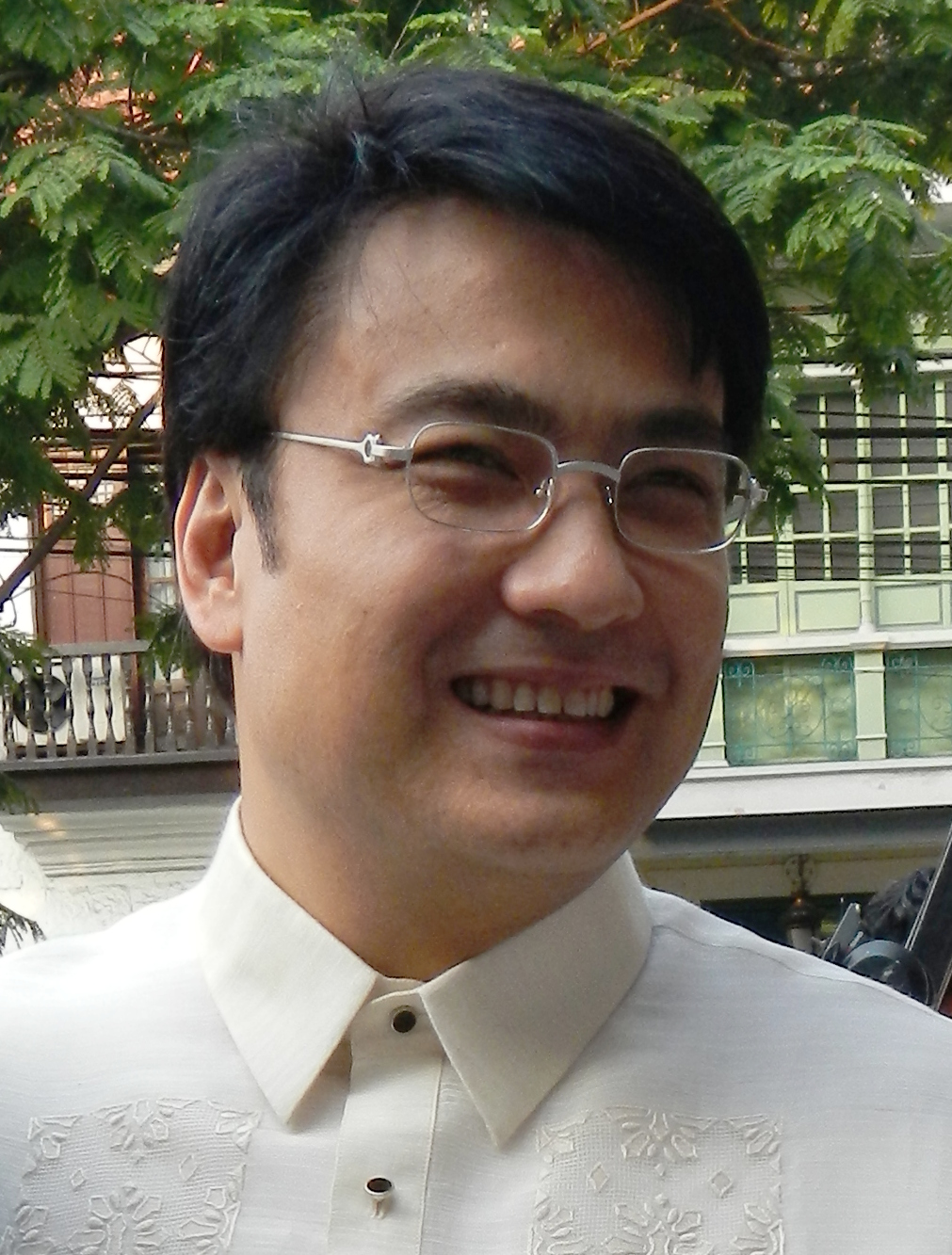
Ramon Bong Revilla, Jr. portrays Enrique "Henry" S. Cruz/"Alyas Pogi".

- Ramon "Bong" Revilla Jr. as Enrique "Henry" S. Cruz/"Alyas Pogi"
- Rita Avila as Divina
- Charito Solis as Sianang
- Jay Ilagan as Jimboy Rodrigo
- Michael de Mesa as Banjo
- Leo Martinez as Teng-Teng
- Lani Lobangco as Lilia
- Bernard Bonnin as Don Pepe Rodrigo
- Subas Herrero as Don Felipe
- Bomber Moran as Kardong Kalabaw (lit. 'Carabao Kardo')
- King Gutierrez as Don Pepe's henchman
- Tom Olivar as Don Pepe's henchman
- Manjo del Mundo as Lucas
- Rando Almanzor as Don Pepe's henchman
- Frank Lapid as Don Pepe's henchman
- Efren Lapid as Don Pepe's henchman
- Telly Babasa as Don Pepe's henchman
- Bebeng Amora as Don Pepe's henchman
- Rene Hawkins as barrio captain
- Zandro Zamora as "hepe" (lit. 'Chief')
- Philip Gamboa as "hepe"
- Ding Salvador as police
- Rene Pascual as police
- Ruben Rustia as Padre Jose
- Olive Madredejos as barrio girl
- Criz Daluz as "albularyo"
- Max Alvarado as Manolo
- Danny Labra as man in coffin
- Bebeng Amora as shabu distributor

== Release ==
Alyas Pogi 2 was released in theaters on August 26, 1992.

== Reception ==
Justino Dormiendo, writing for the Manila Standard, gave the film an extremely negative review, calling it a "more empty (but noisy) posturing in the local action genre." In addition to his criticisms toward the lack of "intelligent dialogue", he severely criticized the film's "theater of cruelty" and the filmmakers' blatant violation of the instructions from "censors" to remove or shorten seven violent parts of the film, writing that "I left the theater feeling devastated, dehumanized, and degraded by a bunch of sadists on the screen and the perpetrators behind it."
