= Marissa Delgado =

Filipino actress

- Born: Epifania Boyle
- Other name: Marissa Delgado
- Occupation: Actress
- Years active: 1966–present

Maria Epifania Garcia Boyle, better known by her stage name Marissa Delgado, is a Filipino actress. She has appeared in nearly 90 films from 1965 up to present. She is the mother of former character actor Kevin Delgado and commercial model Avon Garcia.

== Career ==
Delgado won two awards in Philippine films - Best Supporting Actress for Lumuha Pati Mga Anghel in 1971, and Till Death Do Us Part in 1972. She was nominated for Gawad Urian Award in 1977 for Ligaw Na Bulaklak and FAMAS Award, Best Supporting Actress for Sa Akin Pa Rin ang Bukas in 1988.

Delgado started in showbiz as an extra via Dance-O-Rama starred Susan Roces and Jose Mari as the lead actors. After 2 years, she came back as made her a leading lady of two of the great comedians in the Philippines which is Dolphy and Chiquito from the film Dalawang Kumander sa WAC.

Because of her sharp looks, she was often cast as a "kontrabida" (villain) with penchant for big earrings, curly hair, mini-skirts and heavy make-up. A favorite of National Artist for Film, Lino Brocka, Delgado was seen in films - Tubog sa Ginto (1970); Stardoom (1971); Bona (1979), Ang Tatay Kong Nanay (1976), Mananayaw (1978) as a feisty type of a woman. She would also be seen in Chaning Carlos films like Bato-bato sa Langit (1976); Divino (1976); Darna, Kuno? (1979). Other film assignments include Lipad, Darna, Lipad! (1973); Wonder Vi (1974); Tao Ako Di Hayop (1976); Ligaw Na Bulaklak (1976); Buhay Mo, Buhay Ko (1976); Darna at Ding (1980); Diborsyda (1980); Bomba Star (1979); I Can't Stop Loving You (1985); Pahiram ng Ligaya (1985); Rosa Mistica (1988); Sa Akin Pa Rin ang Bukas (1988); Umiyak Pati Langit (1991); Espadang Patpat (1991); Kabit ni Mrs. Montero (1991); Bitoy ang Itawag Mo sa Akin (1997); Pagdating ng Panahon (2001).

She became a household name when she portrayed the comic character Manay Sharon in Duplex over RPN-9 every Saturday. She is the funny and yet loving wife of Daddy Groovy as played by director Ading Fernando and the mistress of the dim-witted Liweng as ably portrayed by Janice Jurado and the friend of Neneng as essayed by Soxy Topacio. The sitcom started in 1980 until 1984.

She is the mother of Avon Garcia, Binibining Pilipinas 1987 finalist and Siegfried Garcia, child actor in Kaluskos Musmos (1979–81)

In 1985, she opened a recruitment and talent agency, wherein she develops and sends Filipino entertainers in jobs abroad. She took a respite in showbiz but occasionally would be seen in teleseryes. In 2016, she graduated from the University of the Visayas in Cebu City with a BSBA major in HRM.

== Filmography ==
=== Film ===
Year	Title	Role
1971	Tubog sa Ginto	Gracita
1971	Lumuha Pati Mga Anghel	Leona
1972	The Big Bird Cage	Rina
1974	Bamboo Gods and Iron Men	Pandora
1975	The Goodfather	
1978	Ang Tatay Kong Nanay	Mariana Jimenez
1978	Bomba Star	Stella Fuego
1978	Ricardo Y. Feliciano's Mga Mata ni Angelita	The Sister
1979	Darna, Kuno?	Estelga
1980	Darna at Ding	Dr. Vontesberg
1980	Bona	Katrina
1982	Santa Claus Is Coming to Town!	
1986	Sana'y Wala Nang Wakas	Miss Tolentino
1987	Kapitan Pablo: Cavite Killing Fields	Marietta
1988	Rosa Mistica	Mike's mother
1988	Sana Mahalin Mo Ako	Margarita
1988	Nakausap Ko ang Birhen	Merlie
1988	Bobo Cop	
1988	Sa Akin Pa Rin ang Bukas	Marina
1988	Pepeng Kuryente: Man with a Thousand Volts	Marcelina
1990	Espadang Patpat	
1991	Ang Totoong Buhay ni Pacita M.	
1992	Dalawa Man ang Buhay Mo, Pagsasabayin Ko	Aida
1996	Nag-iisang Ikaw	Janet Corrales
1997	Nakalimot na Pag-ibig	Cecillia
1998	Campus Scandal	Mrs. Jimenez
1999	Ang Kabit ni Mrs. Montero	Aling Puring
2002	Super B	Madam Puring
2003	Lupe: A Seaman's Wife	Magda
2003	Till There Was You	Zita Robles
2005	Bikini Open	Josie Sta. Ana
2005	Ispiritista: Itay, May Moomoo	Mrs. Bernabe
2007	Apat Dapat, Dapat Apat: Friends 4 lyf and death	KGD Maxima Macapagal
2009	Manila	Rodelya
2010	Si Agimat at si Enteng Kabisote	
2015	Everyday I Love You	Lola Maribel
2017	Unexpectedly Yours	Mila
2018	DOTGA: Da One That Ghost Away	Lola Coquita
2018	Miss Granny	Lulu Nemenso
2019	Familia Blondina	Aling Laura
2019	S.O.N.S: Sons of Nanay Sabel	Doña Narcisa
2019	3pol Trobol: Huli Ka Balbon!	Lola Nida Pahak
TBA	Kuya: The Governor Edwin Jubahib Story	

=== Television ===
Year	Title(s)	Role(s)	Notes
1980–1985	Anna Liza	Elvie	
1994	Ipaglaban Mo!		Episode: "Lason sa Dugo"
2004	Wag Kukurap	Special guest	
2005	Kapmanerang Kuba	Grandma Mangkukulam	
2006	Maging Sino Ka Man	Eloisa Davide	
2007	Sineserye Presents Hiram Na Mukha	Kapitana	
2007	Carlo J. Caparas' Kamandag	Bebeng	
2008	Ful Haus	Mrs. Andrea Palisoc	
2008	Obra	Special guest	
2009	Katorse	Doña Remedios Madrigal	
2009	Ikaw Sana	Doña Amanda Gallardo-Montemayor	
2010	Carlo J. Caparas's Panday Kids	Doña Guada Salcedo	
2010	Bantatay	Doña Clarita Enriquez	
2011	Elena M. Patron's Blusang Itim	Concha Lopez-Santiago	
2012	Luna Blanca	Doña Consuelo Buenaluz	
2012–2014	Be Careful With My Heart	Doña Esmeralda Lim	
2014–2015	Forevermore	Doña Soledad Grande	
2016	We Will Survive	Luz San Juan	
2018	FPJ's Ang Probinsyano	Melba	
2019	Sahaya	Maureen Alvarez	
2019	Maynila: Grow Old with You	Lucia	
2021	He's Into Her	Bhaves	
2021	Niña Niño	Governor Virginia	
2024	My Guardian Alien	Nova Soriano	
