= Magiting at Pusakal =

1972 Filipino film starring Fernando Poe Jr. and Joseph Estrada

- Theatrical release poster
- Directed by: Augusto Buenaventura
- Written by: Augusto Buenaventura; Ruben Rustia
- Starring: Fernando Poe Jr.; Joseph Estrada; Rosanna Ortiz; Jeanne Young
- Cinematography: Fermin Pagsisihan
- Edited by: Atilano Salvador
- Music by: Ernani Cuenco
- Production company: Joseph Estrada Productions
- Release date: April 15, 1972
- Country: Philippines
- Language: Tagalog

Magiting at Pusakal is a 1972 Filipino action film starring Fernando Poe Jr. and Joseph Estrada. Directed by Augusto Buenaventura and co-written by Buenaventura and Ruben Rustia, the film is about Leon and Joe, two fugitives of contrasting personalities who try to avoid capture during the Japanese occupation of the Philippines. Produced by Joseph Estrada Productions, the film was released in the Philippines on April 15, 1972, and was later given a re-release in 1988.

== Cast ==
- Fernando Poe Jr. as Leon Magsalin
- Joseph Estrada as Joe Ronquillo
- Rosanna Ortiz as Salome
- Jeanne Young
- Ruben Rustia as Kalayaan
- Angelo Ventura
- Jesse Lee
- Ruel Vernal
- Jon Mariano
- Bert Lafortaza
- Avel Morado
- Blanco Santos
- Vic Gaza
- Pecos Lachica
- SOS Daredevils
- TNT Boys

== Release ==
Magiting at Pusakal was originally released in the Philippines on April 15, 1972. The film was later given a re-release in wet season 1988.

=== Critical response ===
Upon the film's re-release in 1988, Lav Diaz gave the film a mixed review, criticizing the credits and action sequences as lacking ("A few blasts of the heroes' guns, already so many enemies are falling down") while praising the film's timely themes and Joseph Estrada's ability to deliver amusing one-liners as the "pusakal" (a person addicted to stealing and gambling).
