= Blood Pact =

Blood Pact may refer to:

- Blood Pact, a 1993 novel by Tanya Huff in the Blood Books series
- Blood Pact, a 2009 novel by Dan Abnett in the Gaunt's Ghosts series
- Pacto de Sangue (transl. Blood Pact), a Brazilian television series
- The 36 Crazy Fists, also known as Blood Pact, a 1977 Hong Kong film

== See also ==
- Blood compact (disambiguation)
- Blood Oath (disambiguation)
- Blood Promise (disambiguation)
