= Blood Compact (film) =

- Starring: Joseph Estrada
- Release date: 1972
- Running time: 2 hours
- Country: Philippines
- Languages: Tagalog; Filipino
- Budget: PhP

Blood Compact is a 1972 Filipino action film starring former Philippine President Joseph Estrada.
