= Alyas Pogi: Ang Pagbabalik =

- Official movie poster
- Directed by: Joey del Rosario
- Screenplay by: Bien Ojeda; Joey Del Rosario
- Story by: Tammy Bejerano; Bien Ojeda
- Produced by: Malou N. Santos
- Starring: Ramon "Bong" Revilla Jr.
- Cinematography: Rey de Leon
- Edited by: Joyce Bernal
- Music by: Jaime Fabregas
- Production company: Star Cinema
- Distributed by: Star Cinema
- Release dates: August 1, 1999 (Davao); August 11, 1999 (Manila)
- Running time: 111 minutes
- Country: Philippines
- Language: Filipino

Alyas Pogi: Ang Pagbabalik (lit. ' Alias Handsome: The Return') is a 1999 Filipino action film directed by Joey del Rosario. Ramon "Bong" Revilla Jr. reprises his role as the titular policeman. The film is the third installment of the Alyas Pogi film series.

The film is streaming online on YouTube. A fourth installment, titled Birador: Alyas Pogi 4, is currently in production.

== Plot ==
Henry "Alyas Pogi" Cruz (Bong) is released from prison after serving a 12-year sentence. He returns home and realized that his son Paris (Carlo) was adopted by Mang Ben (Ray), who also preserved his former getup and his katana. Despite being reunited with his son, he realized that Mang Ben and his fellow farmers are being threatened by Mayor Villegas (Tonton) and his henchmen led by his brother Leo (Jeffrey) to leave their place to give way to the construction of a casino. Convinced by Mang Ben, he dons his Alyas Pogi persona and uses his old ways to eliminate the Mayor's henchmen.

== Cast ==
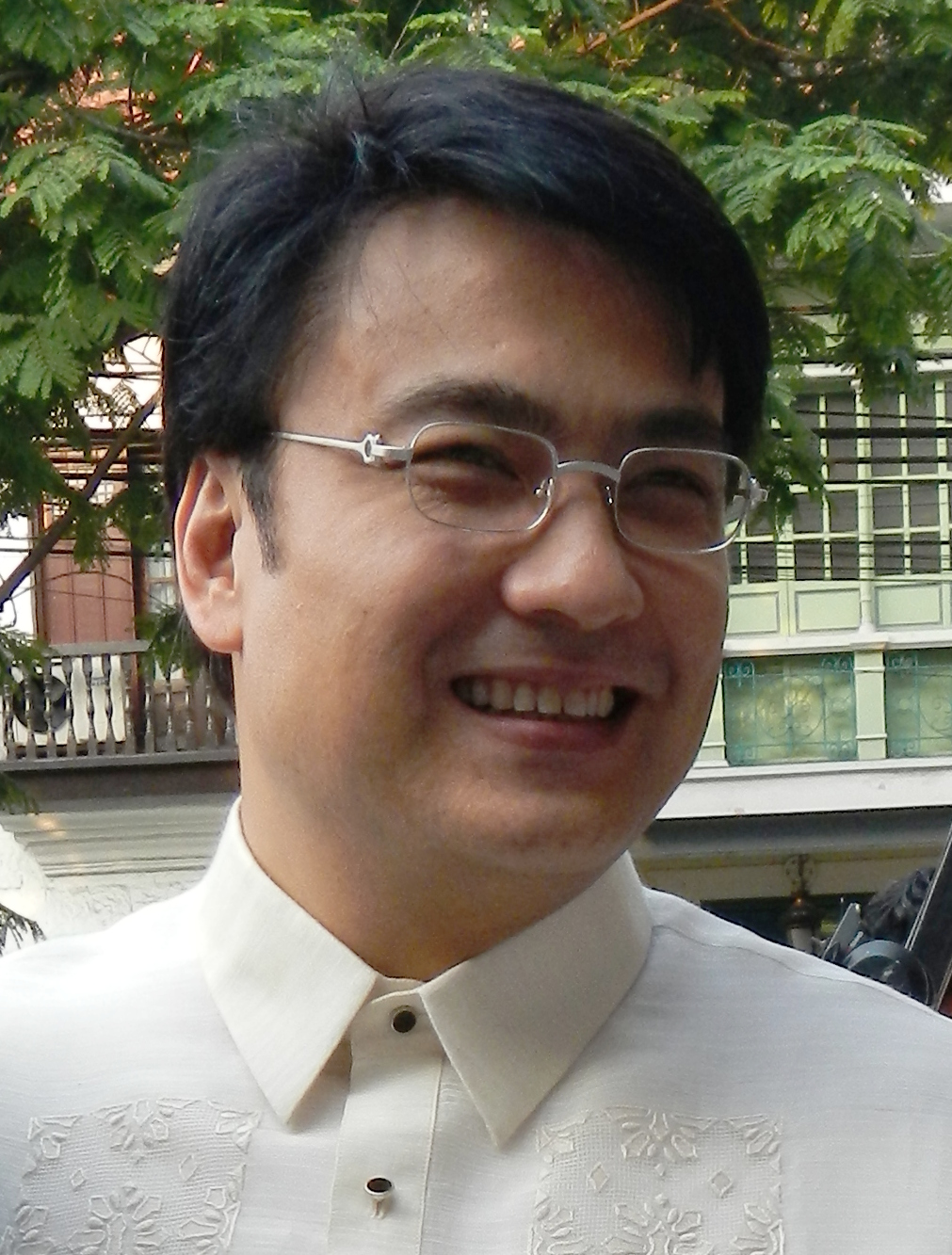
Ramon Bong Revilla, Jr. portrays Enrique "Henry" S. Cruz/"Alyas Pogi".

Main cast

- Ramon "Bong" Revilla, Jr. as Enrique "Henry" S. Cruz/"Alyas Pogi"
- Ara Mina as Roselle Acosta
- Tonton Gutierrez as Mayor Villegas

Supporting roles

- Jeffrey Santos as Leo Villegas
- Efren Reyes Jr. as Capt. Perez
- Carlo Aquino as Paris Acosta/Paris M. Cruz
- Gio Alvarez as Tonyo
- Ray Ventura as Ben Acosta
- Archie Adamos as Atty. Costales
- William Lorenzo as Atty. Victor Simon
- Arbie Antonio as Lazaro
- Archie Ventosa as Rafael Aragon
- Jessette Prospero as Elsa Aragon
- Gerald Ejercito as Jake
- R.G. Gutierrez as Rico
- Ronald Asinas as Gardo
- Rona Manuel as Lulu
- Jaira Gomez as Mariel Simon
- Florante Tagulo as Amador
- Girlie Alcantara as Desta
- Bien Ojeda as Tomas
- Muriel Apuyan as Olivia
- Eric Francisco as a security guard
- Ina Alegre as Leo's girl
- Eileen Tinio as Elementary Teacher
- Dante Castro as Kanor
- Susan Corpuz as Aling Selina
- Marivic Sales as Paula
- Jerry Sacdalan as Ka Ambo

== Accolades ==
| Award-Giving Body | Category | Recipient | Result |
|---|---|---|---|
1999 FAMAS Awards
| 1999 FAMAS Awards | Best Actor | Ramon "Bong" Revilla, Jr. | Nominated |
| 1999 FAMAS Awards | Best Special Effects | Erick Torrente | Won |
