= 1987 Metro Manila Film Festival =

Film festival edition

- Date: December 25, 1987 to January 3, 1988
- Site: Manila

Highlights
- Best Picture: Olongapo, The Great American Dream
- Most awards: The Untold Story of Melanie Marquez (5)

The 13th Metro Manila Film Festival was held in 1987.

Six entries participated in the 10-day festival. Olongapo, The Great American Dream was adjudged Best Picture in the 1987 Metro Manila Film Festival as well as the Best Supporting Actress for Susan Africa among others. Anthony Alonzo once again received the Best Actor Award for Anak Badjao and Melanie Marquez was awarded the Best Actress Award as well as the Best Story for The Untold Story of Melanie Marquez. Action Is Not Missing (Crack Platoon) was the highest-grossing entry in the festival.

== Entries ==
Title	Starring	Studio	Director	Genre
1+1=12+1 (Cheaper By The Dozen)	Susan Roces, Eddie Gutierrez, Roderick Paulate, Lotlot de Leon, Sheryl Cruz, Matet de Leon, Dranreb Belleza, Brylle Mondejar, Jigo Garcia, Jaypee De Guzman, Chuckie Dreyfus, Katrin Gonzales, Isabel Granada, RR Herrera	Regal Films	Mike Relon Makiling	Comedy, Family
Action Is Not Missing (Crack Platoon)	Dolphy, Paquito Diaz, Carlos 'Sonny' Padilla, Manny Boy Quizon, Freddie Quizon, Edgar Quizon, Rommel Valdez Dick Israel, Renato del Prado, Max Vera, Francis Magalona	RVQ Productions	Angel Labra	Action, Comedy
Anak Badjao	Anthony Alonzo, Charito Solis, Tony Santos Sr., Liza Lorena, Alicia Alonzo, Marithes Samson, Isadora	Triple A Films	Jose Antonio Alonzo and Jerry Tirazona	Action, Drama
Huwag Mong Buhayin ang Bangkay	Charito Solis, Ricky Davao, Pinky Suarez, Jestoni Alarcon, Rita Avila, Jojo Alejar, Romnick Sarmenta, Jennifer Sevilla	Seiko Films	Mauro Gia Samonte|ceb|Mauro Samonte	Drama, Horror, Thriller
Olongapo...The Great American Dream	Jacklyn Jose, Chanda Romero, Joel Torre, Susan Africa, Marilou Sadiua, Pete Cooper, Raoul Aragonn, Joy Virata	Asian American Film Institute	Chito Roño	Drama
The Untold Story of Melanie Marquez	Melanie Marquez, Caridad Sanchez, Tony Santos Sr., Rosemarie Gil, Rene Salud, Totoy Marquez, Maya dela Cuesta	Miracle Boy Films International	Artemio Marquez	Drama

== Winners and nominees ==
=== Awards ===
Winners are listed first and highlighted in boldface.

Best Film	Best Director
**Olongapo, The Great American Dream**; The Untold Story of Melanie Marquez (2nd Best Picture); Anak Badjao (3rd Best Picture); Action Is Not Missing (Crack Platoon); 1 + 1 = 12 + 1; Huwag Mong Buhayin ang Bangkay	Artemio Marquez – The Untold Story of Melanie Marquez
Best Actor	Best Actress
**Anthony Alonzo – Anak Badjao**	Melanie Marquez – The Untold Story of Melanie Marquez
Best Supporting Actor	Best Supporting Actress
**Roderick Paulate – 1+1=12+1**	Susan Africa – Olongapo, The Great American Dream
Best Art Direction	Best Cinematography
**Apol Salonga – Wag mong Bubuhayin ng Bangkay**	Apolinario Cuenco – Anak Badjao
Best Sound Engineering	Best Music
**Juanito Clemente – Olongapo, The Great American Dream**	Marita Manuel – Anak badjao
Best Child Performer	Best Editing
**Cheche Sta. Ana – Action Is Not Missing (Crack Platoon)**	Rogelio Salvador – The Untold Story of Melanie Marquez
Best Story	Best Screenplay
**Melanie Marquez – The Untold Story of Melanie Marquez**	Frank Vrechek, Alan Cummings, and Ricardo Lee – Olongapo, The Great American Dream

== Multiple awards ==
Awards	Film
5	The Untold Story of Melanie Marquez
4	Olongapo, The Great American Dream
4	Anak Badjao

Preceded by 1986 Metro Manila Film Festival	Metro Manila Film Festival; 1987	Succeeded by 1988 Metro Manila Film Festival
