= Seiko Films =

Philippine film production company

- Type: Private
- Industry: Film production
- Founded: 1981
- Defunct: 2007
- Fate: Closed due to intense competition
- Headquarters: Manila, Philippines
- Key people: Robbie Tan

Seiko Films was a Philippine film production company owned and run by Robbie Tan. It is known for its erotic films (colloquially known as "bold movies") of the late 1990s. Seiko Films was known for its tagline "If it's from Seiko, it must be good" used from 1989 to 1994. The company is not affiliated with the Japanese company sharing the same name.

== History ==
Seiko Films was founded in 1981 by Robbie Tan. Its initial offering was Panlaban: Dos por Dos, starring Rex Lapid and Bomber Moran and written and directed by Mike Relon Makiling. Since then, after the People Power Revolution, Seiko Films immediately became one of the major film production studios in the late 80s, alongside Monteverde's Regal Films and Vic Del Rosario's Viva Films. The film production is home to its homegrown stars, mostly Regal babies like Romnick Sarmenta, Sheryl Cruz, Rey "PJ" Abellana and Gretchen Barretto as well as talents inside Seiko like Jestoni Alarcon, Ian Veneracion, John Regala, Cesar Montano and Rita Avila. Among its most memorable productions during its early years are The Life Story of Julie Vega and Blusang Itim, as well as horror flicks Huwag Mong Buhayin ang Bangkay, and Hiwaga sa Balete Drive.

Robbie Tan explained that his decision-making process when it comes to greenlighting film projects is primarily based on what is popular among audiences.

In 1989, Seiko increased its production in action films, by the time the genre was on the rise. Among its notable action movies produced were Ang Lihim ng Golden Buddha and Alyas Baby Face, as well as biographical films Ako ang Batas: General Karingal, Canary Brothers and Lt. Col. Alejandro Yanquling, and DZRH-based dramas Kunin Mo ang Ulo ni Ismael, Kasalanan ang Buhayin Ka and Lumaban Ka, Itay. A majority of the films produced throughout the 1990s are focused on this genre.

Sex trip (ST) was among Seiko's primary focus. It was in 1995 when it increased its production in ST films, with Rosanna Roces, Priscilla Almeda, Natasha Ledesma, Leandro Baldemor and Gardo Versoza in its stable of talents. Seiko made Rosanna Roces a popular sex symbol. This would be Seiko's focus starting in 2000.

In 2003, Seiko released the Liberated series, directed by Mac Alejandre, and starred Diana Zubiri, Francine Prieto, and Christian Vazquez which became among the most important films in the history of Seiko. Seiko produced movies later like Bridal Shower (2003), the mockumentary Bikini Open (2005), the family comedy I Wanna Be Happy (2006) and the psycho-erotic thriller Silip (2007). Seiko Films also co-produced the award-winning Foster Child (2007) by director Brilliante Mendoza.

In 2007, Seiko was reportedly suspended by the Movie and Television Review and Classification Board (MTRCB) due to the prominence of the production of erotic films. It was later revealed that it closed down due to intense competition with major film outlets. Since then, Tan shifted his focus on his wallet business.

ABS-CBN currently owns the rights to most of Seiko Films' library, save for a few exceptions owned by co-producer Solar Entertainment.

== Filmography ==
=== 1980s ===
Year	Film	Release	Director	Note(s)	Ref(s).
1981	Panlaban: Dos por Dos	September 11	Mike Relon Makiling		
1982	Bagong Boy Condenado	April 28	Efren C. Piñon		
1982	Isla Sto. Niño	October 8	Mauro Gia Samonte		
1983	Kirot	March 4	Arsenio 'Boots' Bautista		
1983	Iiyak Ka Rin	July 8	Mauro Gia Samonte		
1983	Public Enemy No. 1 and the Innocents	September 9	Arsenio 'Boots' Bautista		
1983	Hanguin Mo Ako sa Putik	December 9	Manuel 'Fyke' Cinco		
1984	Sa Ngalan ng Anak	January 4	Mauro Gia Samonte		
1984	Sex Education	February 3	Mike Relon Makiling		
1984	Goodah!!!	March 8	Mike Relon Makiling		
1984	Angkan ng Sietereales	May 25	Pepe Marcos		
1984	Give Me Five!	June 8	Mike Relon Makiling		
1984	Malisya	July 4	Manuel 'Fyke' Cinco		
1984	Mga Ibong Pipit	August 28	Mauro Gia Samonte		
1984	Kriminal	September 14	Efren C. Piñon		
1984	Kapag Baboy ang Inutang	November 29	Mauro Gia Samonte		
1985	Magchumikap Ka!	January 4	Luciano B. Carlos		
1985	I Won, I Won (Ang Swerte Nga Naman)	January 25	Jose 'Pepe' Wenceslao		
1985	Isang Platitong Mani	February 21	Jun Urbano		
1985	Bomba Queen	April 25	Efren C. Piñon		
1985	Ina, Kasusuklaman Ba Kita?	June 20	Pio de Castro III		
1985	Beware: Bed Sins	September 19	Mario O'Hara		
1985	Paano ang Aking Gabi?	November 7	Efren C. Piñon		
1985	God... Save Me!	December 25	Carlo J. Caparas		
1986	Blusang Itim	February 14	Emmanuel H. Borlaza		
1986	Family Tree	May 22	Mike Relon Makiling		
1986	Halik sa Pisngi ng Langit	June 26	Efren C. Piñon		
1986	Huwag Mo Kaming Isumpa!	July 3	Leroy Salvador		
1986	Lumuhod Ka sa Lupa!	August 21	Manuel 'Fyke' Cinco		
1986	Ang Mahiwagang Singsing	October 9	Mike Relon Makiling		
1987	The Sisters	May 21	Emmanuel H. Borlaza		
1987	Black Magic	November 26	Mike Relon Makiling		
1987	Huwag Mong Buhayin ang Bangkay	December 25	Mauro Gia Samonte		
1988	Puso sa Puso	May 25	Emmanuel H. Borlaza		
1988	Hiwaga sa Balete Drive	June 2	Peque Gallaga, Lorenzo A. Reyes		
1988	Isusumbong Kita sa Diyos	June 16	Emmanuel H. Borlaza		
1988	Apoy sa Lupa	August 18	Emmanuel H. Borlaza		
1988	Mirror Mirror on the Wall	September 8	Emmanuel H. Borlaza		
1988	Natutulog Pa ang Diyos	September 22	Lino Brocka		
1988	One Two Bato, Three Four Bapor	December 14	Ben Feleo		
Magkano ang Iyong Dangal?	December 25	Laurice Guillen			
1989	Walang Panginoon	January 12	Mauro Gia Samonte		
1989	Ipaglalaban Ko!	July 27	Manuel "Fyke" Cinco		
1989	Babayaran Mo ng Dugo	September 7	Francis "Jun" Posadas		
1989	Ang Bukas Ay Akin	December 25	Laurice Guillen		

=== 1990s ===
Year	Film	Release	Notes
1990	"Ako ang Batas" -Gen. Tomas Karingal	March 1	
1990	Kasalanan ang Buhayin Ka	March 8	
1990	Beautiful Girl	June 28	
1990	Naughty Boys	October 9	
1990	Ama... Bakit Mo Ako Pinabayaan?	December 25	
1991	Akin Ka... Magdusa Man Ako!	June 20	
1991	Tukso Layuan Mo Ako!	September 11	
1992	Lumayo Ka Man sa Akin	January 25	
1992	Eh, Kasi Bata	May 29	
1992	Jerry Marasigan, WPD	July 8	
1992	Takbo... Talon... Tili!!!	December 25	
1993	Lumaban Ka ...Itay!	February 24	
1993	Pulis Patola	October 14	
1994	Bawal Na Gamot	March 27	
1994	Eat All You Can		
1994	Muntik Na Kitang Minahal		
1995	Pamilya Valderama	November	
1995	Di Mapigil ang Init	December 6	
1996	Itataya Ko ang Buhay Ko	May 27	
1997	Kiliti	February 12	
1998	Berdugo	September 18	
1999	Burlesk King	March 10	
1999	Resbak, Babalikan Kita	November 29	

=== 2000s ===
Year	Film	Release	Notes
2000	Mapagbigay	February 23	
2001	Tikim	November 28	
2002	Itlog	April 3	
2002	Bakat	September 4	
2002	Kasiping	November 27	
2003	Liberated	November 5	
2004	Bridal Shower	January 1	
2004	Liberated 2	July 14	
2005	Bikini Open	May 18	
2006	I Wanna Be Happy	July 12	
2007	Foster Child	May 25	
2007	Silip	June 6	

== Remakes of Seiko films ==
This is a list of some films produced by Seiko that were remade into television series:

- Sineserye Presents: Natutulog Ba ang Diyos? (ABS-CBN, 2007)
- Magkano ang Iyong Dangal? (ABS-CBN, 2010)
- Blusang Itim (GMA Network, 2011)
- Kokak (GMA Network, 2011)
- Mundo Man ay Magunaw (ABS-CBN, 2012)
- Lumuhod Ka Sa Lupa (TV5, 2024)
