= Jerry Marasigan, WPD =

1992 action film starring Jestoni Alarcon

- Directed by: Augusto Salvador
- Written by: Wayne Jorge
- Starring: Gretchen Barretto; Jestoni Alarcon; Michael de Mesa; John Regala; Patrick Dela Rosa; Tobi Alejar; Jimmy Fabregas; Leo Martinez; Joboy Gomez
- Cinematography: Felizardo Bailen
- Edited by: Rene Tala
- Music by: Rey Magtoto
- Production company: Seiko Films
- Distributed by: Seiko Films
- Release date: July 8, 1992
- Running time: 105 minutes
- Country: Philippines
- Language: Filipino

Jerry Marasigan, WPD is a 1992 Filipino action film directed by Augusto Salvador. The film stars Jestoni Alarcon as the titular policeman, alongside Gretchen Barretto, John Regala, Patrick Dela Rosa, Tobi Alejar, Michael de Mesa, Leo Martinez, Jimmy Fabregas, and Joboy Gomez. Produced by Seiko Films, it was released on July 8, 1992.

Critic Justino Dormiendo of the Manila Standard gave the film a negative review, criticizing its shallow antagonists and overall "boring" quality.

== Cast ==
- Jestoni Alarcon as Jerry Marasigan
- Gretchen Barretto
- John Regala as Winston
- Patrick dela Rosa
- Tobi Alejar
- Michael de Mesa
- Leo Martinez
- Jimmy Fabregas
- Joboy Gomez
- Dick Israel
- Joonee Gamboa
- Conrad Poe
- Rusty Santos
- Ramon d'Salva
- Ernie David
- Debraliz Valazote
- Karen Salas
- Cristina Crisol
- Glenda Garcia

== Release ==
Jerry Marasigan was released in theaters on July 8, 1992.

=== Critical response ===
Justino Dormiendo of the Manila Standard gave the film a negative review, considering it to be "totally boring [...] from beginning to end." He criticized the main group of antagonists, the Red Hand Gang, as "cardboard characters" that lack a satisfactory explanation in why they kill people, and stated that the performances of Alarcon, Barretto, and the actors for the said gang "fail to rise above the mundane." Dormiendo concluded that "[f]or an action film, Jerry Marasigan WPD has been sapped of imagination."
