= Bukas Luluhod ang Mga Tala =

Bukas Luluhod ang mga Tala
- Official movie poster
- Directed by: Emmanuel H. Borlaza
- Screenplay by: Jose N. Carreon; Orlando R. Nadres
- Story by: Nerissa Cabral (story)
- Based on: Pangarap Na Bituin by Nerissa Cabral
- Produced by: Ramon N. Salvador
- Starring: Sharon Cuneta; Eddie Rodriguez; Gina Pareno; Pilar Pilapil; Tommy Abuel; Rey "PJ" Abellana; Raymond Lauchengco; Lani Mercado; Eula Valdez; Janet Elisa Giron
- Cinematography: Ely Cruz
- Edited by: Ike Jarlego Jr.
- Music by: Willy Cruz
- Production company: Viva Films
- Release date: July 11, 1984
- Running time: 132 minutes
- Country: Philippines
- Language: Filipino

Bukas Luluhod ang mga Tala (Tomorrow the Stars Will Kneel) is a 1984 Filipino drama film directed by Emmanuel H. Borlaza from a screenplay written by Jose N. Carreon and Orlando R. Nadres, based on the komiks serial written by Nerissa G. Cabral and serialized in Pilipino Komiks Atlas. Starring Sharon Cuneta, Eddie Rodriguez, Gina Pareño, Pilar Pilapil, Tommy Abuel, Rey "PJ" Abellana, Raymond Lauchengco, Lani Mercado, Eula Valdez, and Janet Elisa Giron, with special participation of Christopher de Leon, the film revolves around a girl who was born into a dirt-poor family and who swore revenge on the rich family that kept wronging them.

Produced and distributed by Viva Films, the film was theatrically released on July 11, 1984. The film's theme song "Pangarap na Bituin" is sung by Sharon Cuneta and composed by Willy Cruz. It was a commercial success, becoming one of the highest-grossing Philippine films of the year.

== Plot ==
The movie is about an illegitimate child Rebecca (Sharon Cuneta) who swore revenge against her father Don Roman Estrella (Eddie Rodriguez) and her legitimate half-sisters Alice (Lani Mercado) and Monet (Eula Valdez). The film's title, "Bukas Luluhod ang mga tala", comes from her swearing revenge against the Estrella family.

Rebecca started performing and soon have a successful singing career. She planned on buying the Estrella home but relents and instead made peace with her father and her half-sister Monet. The film ends with Rebecca singing the chorus of "Pangarap na Bituin" while a montage of the movie plays.

== Cast ==
- Sharon Cuneta as Rebecca Rios
- Eddie Rodriguez as Rowel “Roman” Estrella
- Gina Pareño as Fidela Rios
- Pilar Pilapil as Monica
- Tommy Abuel as Ador
- Rey "PJ" Abellana as Dante Mandresa
- Raymond Lauchengco as Jun Rios
- Lani Mercado as Alicia "Alice"
- Eula Valdez as Monet
- Janet Elisa Giron as young Rebecca
- Mary Walter as Donya Concha
- Romeo Rivera as Rebecca's lawyer
- Manny Castañeda as Bing
- Vangie Labalan as Pining
- Timmy Diwa as Ricky
- Charlon Davao as Young Jun
- Jennifer Sevilla as Young Alicia

=== Special participation ===
- Christopher De Leon

== Accolades ==
The film received 5 FAMAS nominations (Best Supporting Actress for Gina Pareño, Best Child Actress for Janet Elisa Giron, Best Story for Nerissa Cabral, Best Sound for Rolly Ruta, Best Musical Score for Willy Cruz) and won Best Sound and Best Musical Score.

The film also won the 1985 FAP Award for Best Sound Engineering.

== Release ==
Bukas Luluhod ang Mga Tala was released in Philippine theaters in July 1984. Within the same month, critic Mike Feria noted in his review that it had become the highest-grossing Philippine film of the year so far.
