= Flora Gasser =

Filipino actor (1930/1931 – 2022)

- Born: November 28, 1932
- Died: November 19, 2022 (aged 89)
- Occupation: Actress
- Years active: 1970s–2022
- Spouse: Harry Gasser (died 2014)
- Children: 2

Flora Gasser (November 28, 1932 – November 19, 2022) was a Filipino film and television actress.

Gasser started an acting career in the '70s. She was known as "The Yaya of Philippine Television" and played roles in the films Batang Z (1996), Joey Boy Munti: 15 Anyos Ka sa Muntinglupa (1991) and Kumander Bawang: Kalaban ng Mga Aswang (1988).

Gasser died on November 19, 2022, at the age of 89.

== Filmography ==
=== Film ===
Year	Title	Role	Note(s)	Ref(s).
1985	I Won, I Won (Ang Swerte Nga Naman)			
1985	Sugat sa Dangal			
1985	I Have Three Hands			
1985	Mga Kuwento ni Lola Basyang			
1985	Menudo at Pandesal			
1986	Paalam... Bukas ang Kasal Ko			
1986	Inday Inday sa Balitaw			
1987	Mga Anak ni Facifica Falayfay			
1987	Pinulot Ka Lang sa Lupa			
1987	Black Magic			
1987	Kumander Gringa			
1988	Stupid Cupid			
1988	Kambal Tuko	Madame Koping		
1988	Super Inday and the Golden Bibe			
1988	Nagbabagang Luha			
1988	One Day, Isang Araw	Yaya of Purunggay		
1988	Kumander Bawang: Kalaban ng Mga Aswang			
1988	Langit at Lupa			
1988	Bakit Kinagat ni Adan ang Mansanas ni Eba?	Nurse		
1989	Mga Kuwento ng Pag-ibig		"Halimuyak" segment	
1989	Magic to Love			
1989	Bilangin ang Bituin sa Langit			
1990	Dyesebel	Maid		
1990	Papa's Girl			
1990	Bakit Ikaw Pa Rin?			
1990	Dadaan Ka sa Ibabaw ng Aking Bangkay			
1990	I Have 3 Eggs			
1990	Apoy sa Lupang Hinirang			
1990	Island of Desire			
1991	Joey Boy Munti: 15 Anyos Ka sa Muntinglupa			
1991	Andrew Ford Medina ('Wag Kang Gamol!)	Beauty parlor customer		
1991	Matud Nila			
1991	Kung Sino Pa ang Minahal			
1991	Ang Utol Kong Hoodlum			
1992	Magsisimba Kang May Bulak sa Ilong!			
1992	Si Lucio at si Miguel (Hihintayin Kayo sa Langit)			
1992	Mainit Na Puso			
1992	Yakapin Mo Akong Muli			
1992	Kahit Buhay Ko			
1992	Cordora: Lulutang Ka sa Sarili Mong Dugo			
1992	Unang Tibok ng Puso			
1992	Kamay ni Cain			
1992	Takbo... Talon... Tili!!!		"Mahiwagang Banga" segment	
1993	Pido Dida 3: May Kambal Na!			
1993	Ms. Dolora X, Ipagtatanggol Kita!			
1993	Mga S'yanong Parak			
1994	Bulag, Pipi at Bingi			
1996	Batang Z			
2012	Moron 5 and the Crying Lady	Albert's yaya		
2016	Ang Sugarol			
