= Kasalanan ang Buhayin Ka =

Philippine action film

- Directed by: Francis "Jun" Posadas
- Screenplay by: Humilde "Meek" Roxas
- Story by: Salvador Royales
- Based on: Kasalanan ang Buhayin ka a DZRH Radio Serial by Salvador Royales
- Produced by: Robbie Tan
- Starring: Cesar Montano; Rita Avila; John Regala
- Cinematography: Ver Dauz
- Edited by: Ruben Natividad
- Music by: Benny Medina
- Production company: Seiko Films
- Distributed by: Seiko Films
- Release date: March 8, 1990
- Running time: 102 minutes
- Country: Philippines
- Languages: Filipino; English

Kasalanan ang Buhayin Ka (trans. It's a Sin to Bring You Back to Life) is a 1990 Philippine action film directed by Francis "Jun" Posadas. The film stars Cesar Montano, Rita Avila and John Regala.

== Plot ==
Following an altercation with the most prominent criminal family in their town, Jimmy (Cesar) loses his eyesight and people closest to him, including his fiancee Carmen (Vivian). He meets Nancy (Rita), a club dancer and a single mother who gives him a reason to plot revenge against his tormentors. Conflict arises when the woman and her son Biboy (Billy Joe) who gave him a purpose to live again are connected to the same family that gave him hell.

== Cast ==
- Cesar Montano as Jimmy
- Joel Torre as Digs
- John Regala as Mateo
- Rita Avila as Nancy
- Vivian Foz as Carmen
- Jojo Alejar as Pinggoy
- Billy Joe Crawford as Biboy
- Jovit Moya as Erning
- Vanessa Escaño
- Odette Khan as Mrs. Valdez
- Mary Walter as Jimmy's Grandmother
- Dan Fernandez as Ding
- Cris Daluz as Enciong
- Ros Olgado
- Joseph de Cordova
- Turko Cervantes
- Edmund Cupcupin as Dr. Mercado

== Production ==
Jestoni Alarcon was originally cast as the leading role, but turned it down in favor of another movie. Eventually, the role went to Cesar Montano, marking his first major role in an action film. Ogie Alcasid was commissioned to sing the movie theme song composed by Rey Magtoto.
