= Apoy sa Karagatan =

Philippine drama film

- Directed by: Mauro Gia Samonte
- Written by: Mauro Gia Samonte
- Produced by: Lily Y. Monteverde
- Starring: Jestoni Alarcon; Tonton Gutierrez; Tara Vios; Kara Kristel
- Cinematography: Carding Herrera; Caloy Salcedo
- Edited by: Danny Gloria
- Music by: Nonong Buencamino
- Production company: Regal Entertainment
- Distributed by: Regal Entertainment
- Release date: June 27, 2001
- Running time: 83 minutes
- Country: Philippines
- Language: Filipino

Apoy sa Karagatan is a 2001 Philippine action film written and directed by Mauro Gia Samonte. The film stars Jestoni Alarcon, Tonton Gutierrez, Tara Vios and Kara Kristel.

The film is streaming online on YouTube.

== Plot ==
Johnny Laguna (Jestoni), a bounty hunter, is on a mission to rescue Anna (Tara) from the hands of her abductor (Derek). Michael Tantongco (Tonton), Anna's husband who is the town mayor, is willing to give a reward of P1 million to whoever can rescue his wife.

== Cast ==
- Jestoni Alarcon as Johnny
- Tonton Gutierrez as Michael
- Derek Dee as Guiller
- Edgar Mande
- Tara Vios as Anna
- Kara Kristel as Evelyn
- Robert Miller
- Froilan Sales
- Alex Bolado
- Eddie Patis as Himself
- Christian Galindo

== Production ==
Production of the film took over a month from October to November 2000 in Real, Quezon. It was in late June 2001, a month after Jestoni on as councilor of Antipolo, when it was finally released.
