= Hiwaga sa Balete Drive =

1988 Philippine horror film directed by Peque Gallaga and Lore Reyes

- Official movie poster
- Directed by: Peque Gallaga; Lore Reyes
- Screenplay by: Ang Babae sa Balete Drive: Jose Javier Reyes; Peque Gallaga; Lore Reyes; Ikatlong Mata: Orlando R. Nadres; Peque Gallaga; Lore Reyes; Jake Cocadiz
- Story by: Ang Babae sa Balete Drive: Rene Mariano; Peque Gallaga; Lore Reyes; Orlando R. Nadres; Jose Javier Reyes; Ikatlong Mata: Lore Reyes; Orlando Nadres
- Produced by: Robbie Tan
- Starring: Ang Babae sa Balete Drive: Jestoni Alarcon; Rita Avila; Zsa Zsa Padilla; Mary Walter; Ikatlong Mata: Joel Torre; Charito Solis; Gina Alajar
- Narrated by: Rene Mariano
- Cinematography: Eduardo Jacinto
- Edited by: Augusto Salvador
- Music by: Nonong Buencamino
- Production company: Seiko Films
- Distributed by: Seiko Films
- Release date: June 2, 1988
- Running time: 112 minutes
- Country: Philippines
- Languages: Filipino; English

Hiwaga sa Balete Drive (lit. 'Mystery on Balete Drive') is a 1988 Filipino horror anthology film directed by Peque Gallaga and Lorenzo A. Reyes. The film is based on the haunting legends on Balete Drive.

== Plot ==
The film is divided into two stories: Ang Babae sa Balete Drive and Ikatlong Mata.

Ang Babae sa Balete Drive

The couple Dennis (Jestoni Alarcon) and Sandy (Rita Avila) meet Margarita, who haunts a house along Balete Drive. Margarita plans to steal Dennis for her to continue her marriage to her late husband.

Ikatlong Mata

Jonathan (Ian Veneracion) meets an accident, resulting in his third eye opened. He eventually becomes a witness to various crimes through his third eye, including the ones committed by his uncle Paul (Joel Torre).

== Cast ==
- Rene Mariano as Narrator

Ang Babae sa Balete Drive

- Jestoni Alarcon as Dennis
- Rita Avila as Sandy
- Isabel Quiait as Anghel
- Zsa Zsa Padilla as Margarita
  - Mary Walter as Old Margarita
- John Borromeo as Margarita Man #1
- Jeffrey Veloso as Margarita Man #2
- Raul Arellano as Margarita Man #3

Ikatlong Mata

- Charito Solis as Helga
- Joel Torre as Peter and Paul/Roadrunner
- Gina Alajar as Gilda
- Ian Veneracion as Jonathan
- Michael Locsin as Clinton
- Harlene Bautista as Georgie
- Joed Serrano as Melvin
- Romy Romulo as Investigator
- Turko Cervantes as Big Bird
- Sam Brillantes as Samson
- Pen Medina as Gary
- Mario Taguiwalo as Mr. Panopio
- Maya dela Cuesta as Ms. Mijares
