= Gino Antonio =

Filipino actor

- Born: Jack Badon; Philippines
- Occupations: Film and TV actor
- Years active: 1984–2013

Gino Antonio (born Jack Badon) is a former Filipino actor.

== Life and career ==
Antonio came from a family of farmers. He started as a lifeguard before becoming a model and actor. He was identified with bold movies together with Vida Verde, Joy Sumilang, Cristina Crisol, Mark Joseph, Greggy Liwag, Tony Martínez and the late George Estregan.

In 1984, Antonio did his first movie Private Show, which was about the lives of 'toro'/'torera' (live sex performers), with Jacklyn Jose and Leopoldo Salcedo. He was nominated for the Gawad Urian Best Actor award in 1987 for the movie Takaw Tukso. His other notable films includes' Sabik... Kasalanan Ba? (1986), Ginto Sa Putikan (1987), and Virginia P. (1989) starring Alma Moreno, Joey Marquez, Richard Gomez and Alice Dixson.

He was included in the movie Ang Babaeng Nawawala Sa Sarili (1989). In 1990, he did Chito Rono's film' Kasalanan Bang Sambahin Ka? with Vivian Velez, Chanda Romero, Dawn Zulueta and Julio Diaz.

After several years of doing films, Gino Antonio decided to leave the entertainment industry. The former daring actor is now living in Dumaguete. There he tried another field of career.

Gino ventured into agricultural business. He tried to grow rice, fruits, and vegetables. Eventually, After his acting stint, he went to Dumaguete to farm before concentrated on the cultivation of tilapia. He is now President of the Tilapia Association in Dumaguete. https://newspapers.ph/2020/03/gino-antonio-remember-this-former-daring-actor-heres-his-life-now/

== Filmography ==
- 2004 Liberated 2
- 2004 Naglalayag
- 2002 Kapalaran (TV series)
- 2000 Waray
- 2000 Perlas Sa Ilalim Ng Dagat
- 2000 Huwag
- 1998 Divino: Anak Ni Totoy Mola
- 1998 Kung Liligaya Ka Sa Piling Ng Iba
- 1997 Utang Ko Sa Iyo Ang Buhay Ko
- 1997 Mapanuksong Hiyas
- 1997 Haplos Ng Pagmamahal
- 1996 Madaling Mamatay, Mahirap Mabuhay
- 1993 Sgt. Alvarez: Ex-Marine
- 1993 Hulihin: Probinsiyanong Mandurukot
- 1991 Una Kang Naging Akin
- 1990 Tayo Na Sa Dilim
- 1990 Kasalanan Bang Sambahin Ka?
- 1990 Kahit Isumpa Mo Ako
- 1990 Nimfa
- 1990 Anak Ni Baby Ama
- 1989 Ang Babaeng Nawawala Sa Sarili
- 1989 Virginia P.
- 1989 Kailan Mahuhugasan Ang Kasalanan?
- 1988 Damong Makamandag
- 1987 Pakawala
- 1987 Ibigin Mo Ako Nang Higit Sa Lahat
- 1987 Ang Nusog At 3 Itlog
- 1987 Ginto Sa Putikan
- 1987 Amanda
- 1986 Dalagita
- 1986 Haplos Ng Pagmamahal
- 1986 Raid Casa
- 1986 Bawal: Malaswa
- 1986 Kapirasong Dangal
- 1986 Di Maghilom Ang Sugat
- 1986 Hapdi
- 1986 Sabik... Kasalanan Ba?
- 1984 Mahilig
- 1984 Nalalasap Ang Hapdi
- 1986 Takaw Tukso
- 1985 Private Show
- 1984 Mahilig
- 1984 Nalalasap Ang Hapdi
