= Rey Abellana =

Filipino actor

Rey "PJ" Abellana
- Born: Reynante Hofileña Abellana; September 2, 1962 (age 64); Silay, Negros Occidental, Philippines
- Other name: PJ
- Occupation: Actor
- Spouse: Rea Reyes
- Children: 6 (including Carla)
- Relatives: Jojo Abellana (brother)

Reynante Hofileña Abellana (Tagalog pronunciation: [ʔɐbɛlˈjanɐ]; born September 2, 1962), professionally known as Rey "PJ" Abellana, is a Filipino actor who is best known for his portrayal as PJ in the Philippine TV series Anna Liza in the 1980s.

Abellana appeared in films such as Shake, Rattle & Roll (1984), Bukas Luluhod ang Mga Tala (1985), Oras-Oras, Araw-Araw (1990), Nang Gabing Mamulat si Eba (Jennifer Segovia Story) (1992) starring Rita Avila and Cristina Gonzales, Doring Dorobo (2000) with Eddie Garcia, Karanasan: The Claudia Zobel Story (1995) starring Sabrina M. and Emilio Garcia, Habang May Buhay (1996) starring Ian de Leon and Donna Cruz, and Birthday Gift 2 (2000) starring Sabrina M.

He also appeared on GMA Network series are Anna Liza from 1980 to 1985 as PJ, others including ABS-CBN TV series Krystala with Judy Ann Santos and Ryan Agoncillo, and Rubi topbilled by Angelica Panganiban. He played a special role in Dahil Sa Pag-ibig starring Piolo Pascual, Bukas Na Lang Kita Mamahalin starring Gerald Anderson, then Ang Probinsyano topbilled by Coco Martin and I Left My Heart in Sorsogon starring Heart Evangelista and Richard Yap.

He married Rea Reyes, his co-star in Anna Liza but has since annulled their marriage. One of their children is Filipina actress Carla Abellana.

== Political views ==
In 1986, Abellana campaigned for the reelection of president Ferdinand Marcos in the 1986 snap election.

== Filmography ==
=== Film ===
Year	Title	Role
1983	Lukaret	
1983	Iiyak Ka Rin	
1983	Hayop sa Ganda	
1983	Summer Holiday	
1983	Daddy Knows Best	
1984	Sa Ngalan ng Anak	
1984	Sex Education	
1984	Goodah!!!	
1984	Dear Mama	
1984	Daddy's Little Darlings	
1984	Bukas Luluhod ang Mga Tala	Dante Mandresa
1984	Chikas	
1984	Mga Ibong Pipit	
1984	The Punks	
1984	Bulaklak ng Apoy	
1984	Kapag Baboy ang Inutang	
1984	Shake, Rattle & Roll	Paolo / Ibarra
1985	Lilac: Bulaklak sa Magdamag	Perting
1985	Zuma	
1985	Miguelito: Batang Rebelde	Roy
1985	Hindi Mo Ako Kayang Tapakan	
1985	Pati Ba Pintig ng Puso?	Jeffrey
1986	The Graduates	
1987	Forward March	Wally
1987	Feliciano Luces: Alyas Kumander Toothpick, Mindanao	
1987	Stolen Moments	Fiedo
1987	Pasan Ko ang Daigdig	Tony
1987	Anak ni Zuma	
1989	Valentina	
1989	Delima Gang	Pedring Delima
1989	Jessa: Blusang Itim 2	
1989	Ang Babaeng Nawawala sa Sarili	
1989	Oras-Oras, Araw-Araw	
1990	Kahit Konting Pagtingin	Robert
1990	Kolehiyala	Ronald
1990	Mga Birhen ng Ermita	
1990	Bakit Ikaw Pa Rin?	
1990	Tayo Na sa Dilim	
1990	Smokey Mountain (Mga Banyaga sa Sariling Lupa)	
1990	Hukom .45	
1992	Nang Gabing Mamulat si Eba (Jennifer Segovia Story)	
1992	Sana Kahit Minsan	
1992	Canary Brothers ng Tondo	Romeo
1992	Patayin si Billy Zapanta – Order of Battle: Enemy No. 1	
1992	Takbo... Talon... Tili!!!	
1993	Kumusta Ka, Aking Mahal?	
1993	Paniwalaan Mo	
1993	Doring Dorobo: Hagupit ng Batas	Rene Damian
1994	Johnny Tiñoso and the Proud Beauty	
1994	Mayor Cesar Climaco	
1995	Bocaue Pagoda Tragedy	
1995	Silakbo	Leopoldo Natividad/David
1995	Karanasan: The Claudia Zobel Story	
1995	Bunso: Isinilang Kang Palaban	Doctor Mike Cordero
1995	Pamilya Valderama	Clemen
1995	Kakaibang Karisma	Rico
1996	Habang May Buhay	
1996	To Saudi with Love	Ruel
1996	Trudis Lilit	
1996	Virgin Island	
1996	Unang Tibok	
1997	Pilya	
1997	Sambahin ang Puri Ko	
1997	Anak ng Yakuza	
1997	Babasaging Kristal	
1997	Siya'y Nagdadalaga	Berto
1997	May Gatas Pa sa Labi	
1998	Karinyosa	Dino
1998	Pisil	
1999	Kalaro	Leonardo Avellana
1999	Saka Natin Itanong Kung... Kasalanan!	
2000	Birthday Gift 2	
2000	Tumbador	Ponso
2001	Blondie 2	Gerard
2001	Panabla	Alex Almendras
2001	Uubusin Ko Ang Bala sa Katawan Mo	Roman Sagrado
2003	Boldstar	Sidro
2003	www.XXX.com	
2004	Bcuz of U	Cara's dad
2004	Kirot sa Dibdib	
2010	In Your Eyes	Storm's dad
2013	Bad Romance	Mr. Eduardo Villapando
2014	The Replacement Bride	
2015	Felix Manalo	Victor Danao
2015	Maria Labo	
2017	DAD: Durugin ang Droga	
2017	Si Tokhang at ang Tropang Buang	
2017	This Time I'll Be Sweeter	Abner
2018	Dito Lang Ako	Ama ni Nelia
2018	To Love Some Buddy	Mr. Buan
2020	I, Will: The Doc Willie Ong Story	Psychiatrist
2022	PaThirsty	Roger
2022	Mamasapano: Now It Can Be Told	PSI Ryan Pabalinas
2023	Nagalit ang Patay sa Haba ng Lamay: Da Resbak	Jose C. Cartaño
2024	Idol: The April Boy Regino Story	
TBA	Heneral Bantag: Anak ng Cordillera	

=== Television ===
Year	Title	Role
1980–85	Anna Liza	PJ
1991–1993	Young Love, Sweet Love	Various
1994–1995	Miranova	Emil
2004	Krystala	Martin
2009	SRO Cinemaserye: Carenderia Queen	Brigido
2010	Rubi	Ignacio Cardenas
2010	Precious Hearts Romances Presents: You're Mine, Only Mine	Alfonso Bernardo
2010	Langit sa Piling Mo	Juanito Flores
2010	Pablo S. Gomez's Juanita Banana	Boy Dimaguiba
2011	Maalaala Mo Kaya: Baunan	Danny
2011	Wansapanataym: Christmas Caroline	Dado
2012	Dahil sa Pag-ibig	Marlon Rivero
2013	Bukas Na Lang Kita Mamahalin	Jimmy Suarez
2014	More Than Words	Emil Fuentes
2015–16	Dangwa	Carlos Guinto
2015	Because of You	Conrado Marquez
2016	Alyas Robin Hood	Leandro Torralba
2018	FPJ's Ang Probinsyano	Lorenzo Alano
2018	Ngayon at Kailanman	Alfred Consuelo
2019	Hanggang sa Dulo ng Buhay Ko	Ross
2019	Wagas: Wait Lang, Is This Love?	Rex
2021–22	I Left My Heart in Sorsogon	Patricio Estrellado
