= Walang Panginoon =

Philippine action drama film

- Official movie poster
- Directed by: Mauro Gia Samonte
- Written by: Mauro Gia Samonte
- Produced by: Michael Tan
- Starring: Jestoni Alarcon; Rita Avila; Robert Arevalo; Joonee Gamboa
- Production company: Seiko Films
- Distributed by: Seiko Films
- Release date: January 12, 1989
- Running time: 100 minutes
- Country: Philippines
- Language: Filipino

Walang Panginoon (English transl. There is no Lord) is a 1989 Philippine political action drama film written and directed by Mauro Gia Samonte. The film stars Jestoni Alarcon, Rita Avila, Robert Arevalo and Joonee Gamboa.

== Plot ==
Crispin (Jestoni), son of a poor tenant, falls in love with Loreta (Rita), the sole heir to hacienda Montemayor, against her father's (Joonee) wishes. Unknown to Crispin, Loreta is pregnant with his child.

== Cast ==
- Jestoni Alarcon as Crispin Maglaya
- John Regala
- Rita Avila as Loreta Montemayor
- Bobby Zshornack
- Leo Lazaro
- Robert Arevalo
- Aurora Sevilla as Estrella
- Michael Locsin
- Harlene Bautista
- Joonee Gamboa as Loreta's Father
- Alicia Alonzo
- Rez Cortez
- Mario Escudero
- E.R. Ejercito as Ka Berong
- Rusty Santos
