= Huwag Mong Buhayin ang Bangkay =

1987 horror film by Mauro Gia Samonte

- Directed by: Mauro Gia Samonte
- Written by: Mauro Gia Samonte
- Produced by: Robbie Tan
- Starring: Jestoni Alarcon; Ricky Davao; Charito Solis
- Cinematography: Ding Austria; Jun Pereira
- Edited by: Augusto Salvador
- Music by: Vehnee Saturno
- Production company: Seiko Films
- Distributed by: Seiko Films
- Release date: December 25, 1987
- Running time: 125 minutes
- Country: Philippines
- Language: Filipino

Huwag Mong Buhayin ang Bangkay (transl. Don't Bring the Dead Back to Life) is a 1987 Philippine horror film written and directed by Mauro Gia Samonte. The film stars Jestoni Alarcon, Ricky Davao and Charito Solis.

Produced and distributed by Seiko Films, the film was theatrically released on December 25, 1987, and it was one of the entries for the 13th Metro Manila Film Festival.

== Synopsis ==
The story follows Aurora, a domineering mother who is devastated after the death of her favorite son Robertito and makes a desperate plea from a witch doctor to being him back to life, resulting to unnatural consequences and tragedy for her family.

== Cast ==
Main cast

- Charito Solis as Aurora
- Ricky Davao as Gabriel
  - Robert Ortega as Young Gabriel
- Jestoni Alarcon as Robertito
  - Josemari Gonzales Jr. as Young Robertito
- Pinky Suarez as Helen
- Rita Avila as Julie

Supporting cast

- Romnick Sarmenta as Boyet
- Jennifer Sevilla as Gigi
- Jojo Alejar as Jessie
- Ruben Rustia as Lucio
- Eddie Infante as Father Augusto
- Alma Lerma as Helen's Mother
- Ernie David as Dagul
- Turko Cervantes as Lucio's Disciple
- Luis Benedicto as Helen's Father
- Celia Guevarra as Puring
- Idda Yaneza as Helen's Friend
- Pong Pong as Peter
- Nonong de Andres as Lucio's Disciple

== Production ==
Ace Vergel was originally cast in the role of Robertito, but due to scheduling conflicts, he had to drop out of the project, with Jestoni Alarcon taking his role.

== Accolades ==
Year	Awards	Category	Recipient	Result	Ref.
1987	13th Metro Manila Film Festival	Best Picture	Huwag Mong Buhayin Ang Bangkay	Nominated	
1987	13th Metro Manila Film Festival	Best Art Direction	Apol Salonga	Won	
