= Walang Awa Kung Pumatay =

- Directed by: Junn P. Cabreira
- Written by: Enrique Mariano; Jun Lawas
- Produced by: Junn P. Cabreira; Joey P. Pineda
- Starring: Robin Padilla; Rita Avila
- Cinematography: Rudy Diño
- Edited by: Popoy Crisostomo; Segundo Ramos
- Music by: Demet Velasquez
- Production company: Omega Releasing Organization
- Distributed by: Omega Releasing Organization
- Release date: August 23, 1990
- Running time: 92 minutes
- Country: Philippines
- Language: Filipino

Walang Awa Kung Pumatay (lit. There is No Mercy in Killing) is a 1990 Philippine action film co-produced and directed by Junn Cabreira. The film stars Robin Padilla and Rita Avila.

== Plot ==
Narding was just a boy when his father, a policeman, was killed. As he grows up, Narding joins a gang and is forced to do unsavory things. He gets involved with the daughter of his boss who is later murdered. Narding is wrongly accused of the murder.

== Cast ==
- Robin Padilla as Narding
- Rita Avila as Kristie
- Conrad Poe as Kapitan Razon
- Dick Israel as Pandong
- Zandro Zamora as Don Rodrigo
- Val Iglesias as Lito
- Dexter Doria as Linda
- Bomber Moran
- June Hidalgo as (Jun Hidalgo)
- July Hidalgo
- Gerry Roman
- Rudy Vicdel (as Rudy Vic Del)
- Rudy Ramirez
- Vic Belaro
- Eddie Tuazon
- Honey Policarpio
- Claudine Gomez
- Romy Nario
- Danny Riel
- Danny Labra
- Olive Madridejos
- Boy Gomez
- Eddie Del Mar
- Richard Sicangco (as Li Chard Sicangco)
- Johnny Ramirez (as Johnny "Boy" Ramirez)
- Edward Salvador
- Romy Romulo

== Production Staff ==
- Fight Director - Val Iglesias
- Production Designed by - Manny Espolong and Ronaldo Cadapan
- Stunt Driver - Greg Rocero
- Costume Department - Dulce Crisostomo
- Sound Department: Cesar Lucas (Sound Supervision), Amber Ramos (Sound Effects)

== Camera and Electrical Department ==
- Danny "Ray" Yabut Jr (as Danny Yabut) - [still photographer]
- Billy Ruello (as Billy Baruelo) - [still photographer]
- Butch Manlosa - [gaffer]

== Film Locations ==
- Panay Avenue QC.
- Davao City, Mindanao
- Obando Bulacan
- Ermita Manila
- Las Pinas

== Theme Song ==
- Maging Sino ka man (Sung by Rey Valera)
