= Babayaran Mo ng Dugo =

1989 Philippine action film

- Directed by: Francis "Jun" Posadas
- Screenplay by: Humilde "Meek" Roxas
- Story by: D. G. Salonga
- Based on: Babayaran Mo ng Dugo by Ofelia Concepcion
- Starring: Jestoni Alarcon; Rita Avila
- Cinematography: Ver Dauz
- Edited by: Augusto Salvador
- Music by: Benny Medina
- Production company: Seiko Films
- Distributed by: Seiko Films
- Release date: September 7, 1989
- Running time: 110 minutes
- Country: Philippines
- Languages: Filipino; English

Babayaran Mo ng Dugo (lit. You Will Pay With Blood) is a 1989 Philippine action film directed by Francis "Jun" Posadas. The film stars Jestoni Alarcon, Rita Avila, John Regala, Robert Arevalo, Michael de Mesa, Subas Herrero, Dick Israel, Maita Soriano, Jovit Moya, and Rachel Lobangco. The film is based on the novel of the same title by Ofelia Concepcion.

== Plot ==
Sid Alonzo is the son of a powerful but respected judge Rafael Alonzo who has a promising career and life ahead of him. When his father imprisons Nelson, the son of Don Enrique which subsequently results in the death of the former in the prison, the rest of the Alonzo family was put in danger. Don Enrique and his men initially sends threats to Sid's family which leads to abducting them during a family outing and kills them, except for Sid who survives the harrowing ordeal and vows revenge.

== Cast ==
- Jestoni Alarcon as Sid Alonzo
- Rita Avila as Amelia
- John Regala as Eric
- Robert Arevalo as Rafael Alonzo
- Michael de Mesa as Nelson
- Subas Herrero as Don Enrique
- Dick Israel as Lito
- Maita Soriano
- Jovit Moya as Nelson's Friend
- Rachel Lobangco as Olga
- Baby O’Brien as Sid's mother
- Precious Hipolito as Sid's sister
- Dan Fernandez as Nelson's Friend
- Fred Moro as Nelson's Friend
- Rusty Santos
- Usman Hassim
- Turko
- Ernie David
- Cris Daluz
- Naty Santiago
- Ernie Zarate
- Big Boy Gomez
