= Jojo Alejar =

Filipino TV host and actor-comedian

- Born: Alfredo Rizalito P. Alejar; June 19, 1966 (age 60); Manila, Philippines
- Other name: Jojo A.
- Occupations: Actor, TV host
- Years active: 1982–present
- Spouse: Anna V. Reyes
- Children: 3

Alfredo Rizalito "Jojo" P. Alejar (born June 19, 1966) is a Filipino TV host, actor-comedian, best known as the founding member of the dance group The Tigers and as the host and producer of The Medyo Late Night Show with Jojo A.

== Early life ==
Alejar studied secondary education at Marist High School, and took political science course at University of Santo Tomas, but showbiz opportunity snatched him away from schooling, thus joining German Moreno's That's Entertainment. But, finished his degree after temporarily leaving showbiz.

== Showbiz career ==
While at Marist, he was a member of the dance group The Tigers together with his two high school friends. They were introduced in now-defunct musical/variety show The Penthouse Live! at GMA-7. While at That's Entertainment, he starred at movie Naughty Boys where he co-starred with Romnick Sarmenta, Robby Tarroza and Michael Locsin.

But after his early showbiz tenure in 1990s, he worked as the chief of staff of Parañaque Congressman Ed Zialcita in early 2000s.

In mid-2000s to 2010s, he got the label of being "The Late Night Lord" after his stint as late night host of Jojo A. All The Way formatted with the likes of TV shows hosted by Jay Leno, David Letterman, and Conan O'Brien, which Alejar also idolized. The said late night show aired in RJTV in 2005 to 2007 as Jojo A. All The Way, in QTV-11 from 2007 to 2009 as The Medyo Late Nite Show With Jojo A. All The Way, at TV5 from 2009 to 2010s, and in GMA-7 from 2014 to 2015 as Medyo Late Night Show with Jojo A. Later, the show returned to TV5, and later returned in RJTV.

== Political views ==
In 1986, Alejar campaigned for the reelection of president Ferdinand Marcos in the 1986 snap election.

He criticized government's response against COVID-19 pandemic in 2020, stating that dissemination about the virus “Too much, too little”, and saying the government isn't strict enough to implement lockdown.

== Personal life ==
Alejar was born on June 19, 1966, in Manila. He is the younger brother of actor Toby Alejar and the fifth out of six brothers.

He spoke against MTRCB questioning ABS-CBN's broadcast of live action Mr. Bean episode showing Rowan Atkinson's butt, saying that the agency is just "overracting".

Alejar is married to Anna Guia Villapando Reyes from Sta. Maria, Bulacan who notably worked for Bangko Sentral ng Pilipinas (BSP). The couple has four children: Alfredo Alexander ("Tra"), Aurora Leticia ("Al"), Alfredo Emmanuel ("Aeman") and Ava Marie ("Ava"). He currently lives in Antipolo with his family.

== Filmography ==
=== Film ===
Year	Title	Role	Note(s)	Ref(s).
1986	Payaso			
1987	Huwag Mong Buhayin ang Bangkay	Jessie		
1988	Langit at Lupa			
1989	Everlasting Love			
1989	First Lessons			
1990	Sagot ng Puso			
1990	Kasalanan ang Buhayin Ka	Pinggoy		
1990	Naughty Boys			
1990	Alyas Baby Face			
1991	Lintik Lang ang Walang Ganti!			
1991	Tukso, Layuan Mo Ako!			
1992	Sonny Boy (Public Enemy No. 1 of Cebu City)			
1995	Alfredo Lim: Batas ng Maynila			
2006	Moments of Love	Duke		
2007	Sa Harap ng Panganib	Engr. Mario		
2007	Shake, Rattle and Roll 9	Hans	Segment "Engkanto"	
2009	Yaya and Angelina: The Spoiled Brat Movie	Sargeant Sarge		
2009	Wapakman	Dr. Rex		
2011	Tween Academy: Class of 2012			
2012	Of All the Things	Chief of Staff		
2016	Ang Bagong Pamilya ni Ponching			
2021	The Ret. Col. Rodrigo Bonifacio Story	Lazaro Macapagal	Documentary	
2022	Mamasapano: Now It Can Be Told	Police Director Catalino Rodriguez		

=== Television ===
Year	Title	Role
1982–87	The Penthouse Live!	The Tigers
1986–93	That's Entertainment	Himself/host/performer
1987–97	GMA Supershow	Himself/host/performer
1993–95	Ober Da Bakod	Funny mad doctor
1995–2002	GMA Telecine Specials	Architect man
1995–present	Bubble Gang	Various roles
2004–07; 2020; 2023–present	Jojo A. All the Way!	Himself/host
2005	Magpakailanman	Himself
2007	The Sobrang Gud Nite Show with Jojo A. All the Way	Himself/host
2007	Shoot That Babe	Himself/host
2007	Camera Café	Assistant employee
2008	The Good Night Show	Himself/host
2008–09	I Love Betty La Fea	Macario
2009–13	Jojo A. All The Way!	Himself/host
2009–11	By Request	Himself/host
2010	M3: Malay Mo Ma-develop	Mon
2012	Lorenzo's Time	Atty. Patrick Dominguez
2013	The Ryzza Mae Show	Himself/guest
2013	Wansapanataym: Tago, Diego, Tago	Jayho
2013–14	Got to Believe	George Zaragosa
2014	The Medyo Late Night Show with Jojo A.	Himself/host
2015	The Medyo Late Night Show with Jojo A.	Himself/host
2015	Sabado Badoo	Himself/guest
2015	Forevermore	Frank Martin
2015	FPJ's Ang Probinsyano	Mafia guy
2016; 2017	Pepito Manaloto	Business Manager
2016	Dear Uge	Lawyer
2017	Tsuperhero	Traffic enforcer
2017	Alyas Robin Hood	Mafia Guy
2018	The Medyo Late Night Show with Jojo A.	Himself/host
2019	Jhone en Martian	Nestor
2020	The Medyo Late Night Show with Jojo A.	Himself/host
2022	TOLS	Romnick Macaspac
2022	Start-Up PH	Master Mentor
2023	The Write One	Nilo Herrera
2024	Gud Morning Kapatid	himself (featured guest)
2024	Pepito Manaloto	Mr. Carlos (episode guest Sept. 14)
2024	Maka	Mark

== Discography ==
- Jojo Alejar (Noisy Records, 1986)
- Ngumangawang Pag-Ibig (as "Master J") (Alpha Records, 2001)

== Awards and nominations ==
Year	Award-giving body	Category	Nominated work	Results
2007	MYX Music Awards	Favorite MYX Celebrity VJ	—N/a	Nominated
