= Pamilya Valderama =

Philippine action film

- Official movie poster
- Directed by: Augusto Salvador
- Written by: Humilde "Meek" Roxas
- Produced by: Robbie Tan
- Starring: Phillip Salvador; John Regala
- Cinematography: Val Dauz; Roger Estrada
- Edited by: Renato de Leon
- Music by: Mon del Rosario
- Production company: RS Productions
- Distributed by: Seiko Films
- Release date: November 15, 1995
- Running time: 110 minutes
- Country: Philippines
- Language: Filipino

Pamilya Valderama (lit. Valderama Family) is a 1995 Philippine action film directed by Augusto Salvador. The film stars Phillip Salvador and John Regala.

== Plot ==
Bobby (Philip) and his brother Sonny (John) are different from each other. Bobby is an NBI agent, while Sonny works for Don Amado's (Paquito) syndicate, whom Bobby is going after. Little do they know Don Amado will become the root of their sibling rivalry.

== Cast ==
- Phillip Salvador as Bobby Valderama
- John Regala as Sonny Valderama
- Nanette Medved as Marivic
- Paquito Diaz as Don Amadeo
- Shirley Fuentes as Joy
- Amado Cortez as Ariston
- Isko Moreno as Elmer
- Kimberly Diaz as Lani
- Cris Villanueva as David
- Mike Gayoso as Brando
- Eula Valdez as Monica
- Rey PJ Abellana as Clemen
- Edmund Cupcupin as Sgt. Goyena
- Cherry Pie Picache as Carmen
- Dindo Arroyo as Sgt. Efren Morales
- Edwin Reyes as Informer
- Bella Flores as Japayuki
- Tony Tacorda as NBI Chief
- Zandro Zamora as Reyes
