= Kung Ako na Lang Sana =

2003 romantic comedy-drama film by Jose Javier Reyes

- Official movie poster
- Directed by: Jose Javier Reyes
- Written by: Jose Javier Reyes
- Original concept: Emmanuel B. Dela Cruz; Dennis C. Teodosio; Guia Gonzales; Mary Rose Colindres; Tammy Bejerano; Theodore Boborol
- Produced by: Elma S. Medua
- Starring: Sharon Cuneta; Aga Muhlach
- Cinematography: Mark Gary
- Edited by: Vito Cajili
- Music by: Raul Mitra
- Production company: Star Cinema
- Distributed by: ABS-CBN Film Productions
- Release date: 24 September 2003
- Running time: 114 minutes
- Country: Philippines
- Languages: Filipino; English

Kung Ako na Lang Sana (English: If Only I Could) is a 2003 Philippine romantic comedy-drama film written and directed by Jose Javier Reyes from an original story concept developed by Tammy Bejerano, Theodore Boborol, Mary Rose Colindres, Emmanuel B. Dela Cruz, and Dennis C. Teodosio. The film's title was based on a song of the same name composed by Soc Villanueva and performed by Bituin Escalante, which was the winning entry at the previous year's Himig Handog competition.

Starring Sharon Cuneta and Aga Muhlach in their first film together as lead stars, the story follows two friends who have been close to each other since their college years, and as time passes, they realize that they have feelings for each other. It also stars Christine Bersola, Dominic Ochoa, Mickey Ferriols, Jennifer Sevilla, and Shintaro Valdez.

Produced and distributed by ABS-CBN Film Productions, the film was theatrically released on 24 September 2003.

== Synopsis ==
Ever since college days, Emmy and Vince have been very close friends. Years passed as they built successful careers respectively; Emmy realizes that she has feelings for her best friend. However, she worries their long-time friendship will end if she doesn't confess.

== Cast ==
Main cast

- Sharon Cuneta as Emmy
- Aga Muhlach as Vicente "Vince/Enteng" Villadolid

Supporting cast

- Christine Bersola as Maria Victoria "Vicky" Regidor
- Mickey Ferriols as Elaine
- Dominic Ochoa as Jaime Vargas
- Jennifer Sevilla as Jeanette
- Shintaro Valdez as Christian
- Patrick Guzman as Greg
- Gabe Mercado as Oscar
- Reggie Curley as Conrad
- Chat Silayan as Tiya Lea
- Butz Aquino as Ed Villadolid
- Banaue Miclat as Melvi
- Raul Montesa as Norman
- Lollie Mara as Cita
- Bing Davao as Mike
- Gilleth Sandico as Maura
- Carme Sanchez as Yaya Bising
- Olivia Lyn Richard as Mariel
- Enid Reyes as Angie
- Mico Aytona as Peter
- Adrian Albert as Danny

== Production ==
Comedian Vic Sotto and actress-presenter Kris Aquino were originally chosen to play the respective roles as Vince and Emmy. However, the former backed out of the project due to his decision not to meddle with the latter's then-heated relationship with Joey Marquez.

The project serves as Christine Bersola's feature film debut, though second if counting a student film during her university days.

=== Filming ===
Filming was halted in early May 2003 when Aga Muhlach got an eye infection. While recovering, Sharon Cuneta spent the supposed filming schedule to promote Walang Kapalit, her film with Richard Gomez.

== Reception ==
=== Critical response ===
Eric John Salut, writing for Pilipino Star Ngayon, gave the film a positive review, calling its storyline "unique" and different from the usual love-and-friendship plots.

=== Accolades ===
| Award-giving organization | Date of ceremony | Category | Recipient(s) | Result | Ref. |
|---|---|---|---|---|---|
| 1st Golden Screen Awards | 24 April 2004 | Best Actor | Aga Muhlach | Won | |
| 27th Gawad Urian Awards | 19 June 2004 | Best Actor | Aga Muhlach | Nominated | |
| 27th Gawad Urian Awards | 19 June 2004 | Best Supporting Actress | Mickey Ferriols | Nominated | |
