= Batas Ko ay Bala =

Philippine action film

- Directed by: Augusto Salvador
- Written by: Humilde "Meek" Roxas; Felix E. Dalay; Roger Fuentebella
- Produced by: William Lao
- Starring: Cesar Montano; Donita Rose; John Regala; Efren Reyes Jr.
- Cinematography: Ver Dauz; Ricardo Herrera
- Edited by: Augusto Salvador; Rene Tala
- Music by: Nonong Buencamino
- Production company: Megavision Films
- Distributed by: Megavision Films
- Release date: September 12, 1996
- Running time: 100 minutes
- Country: Philippines
- Language: Filipino
- Box office: ₱25 million

Batas Ko ay Bala (lit My Law is Bulletproof) is a 1996 Philippine action film co-edited and directed by Augusto Salvador. The film stars Cesar Montano, Donita Rose, John Regala and Efren Reyes Jr.

== Cast ==
- Cesar Montano as Guiller
- Donita Rose as Emma
- John Regala as Ringgo
- Efren Reyes Jr. as Alex
- Bob Soler as Mr. Wagner
- Dick Israel as Victor
- Robert Arevalo as Gen. Madamba
- Conrad Poe as Brando
- Jaime Fabregas as Atty. Morales
- Zandro Zamora as Col. Miranda
- Rolly Lapid as Col. Villar
- Johnny Vicar as Gilbert
- Rebecca Bautista as Arlene
- Anne Villegas as Victor's Wife
- Lara Morena as Rape Victim
- Kim delos Santos as Rape Victim
- May Rivera as Nurse
- Rene Hawkins as NARCOM Agent
- Efren Lapid as Police Sargeant
- Evelyn Vargas as Restaurant Manager
- Rolan Montes as Hostage Taker
- Ben Sagmit as Embalmer

== Production ==
The film had a working title Buhay ang Kabayaran. Principal photography for the film began while Cesar Montano was halfway done with shooting for Bilang Na ang Araw Mo.

Nanette Medved was originally cast in the film, but was not given permission to shoot outside Viva Films, in which she had an exclusive contract with. The role was eventually given to Donita Rose, another exclusive artist of Viva Films whom Montano asked permission for.
