= Doring Dorobo: Hagupit ng Batas =

1993 Filipino film

Doring Dorobo
- Directed by: Augusto Salvador
- Written by: Antonio Pascual
- Produced by: Emilia Santos-Blas
- Starring: Eddie Garcia
- Cinematography: Johnny Araojo
- Edited by: Danny Gloria; Augusto Salvador
- Music by: Jaime Fabregas
- Production company: Lea Productions
- Distributed by: Lea Productions
- Release date: December 25, 1993
- Running time: 115 minutes
- Country: Philippines
- Language: Filipino

Doring Dorobo: Hagupit ng Batas (lit. Whip of the Law) is a 1993 Philippine biographical action film co-edited and directed by Augusto Salvador. Starring Eddie Garcia in the title role, the film is based on the life of former NBI agent Doroteo Rocha. It was one of the entries in the 1993 Metro Manila Film Festival and the final film produced by Lea Productions.

== Cast ==
- Eddie Garcia as Doroteo "Doring" Rocha
- Eddie Gutierrez as Col. Cervantez
- Boots Anson-Roa as Dely
- Paquito Diaz as Jerry Balacundiong
- Dick Israel as Bart Pasuball
- Rey "PJ" Abellana as Rene Damian
- Vivian Foz as Letty
- Ali Sotto as Linda
- Sharmaine Arnaiz as Ali
- Ernie Zarate as NBI Director Alfredo Lim
- Mia Gutierrez as Remedios
- Robert Miller as Teddy
- Eddie Tuazon as German
- Eric Francisco as Jimmy Samodio
- Ernie David as Allan
- Joey Padilla as Pat. Meneses
- Romy Romulo as Pat. Licuanan
- Mike Vergel as David Cuartero
- Louie Katana as Mr. Wan Tan

== Awards ==
Year	Awards	Category	Recipient	Result	Ref.
1993	19th Metro Manila Film Festival	Best Picture	Doring Dorobo	Nominated	
1993	19th Metro Manila Film Festival	Best Editing	Augusto Salvador	Won	
1993	19th Metro Manila Film Festival	Best Visual Effects	Bobby Pineda	Won	
