= Robert Arevalo =

Filipino actor (1938–2023)

- Arevalo in Sa Aking mga Kamay (1996)
- Born: Robert Francisco Ylagan; May 6, 1938; Manila, Commonwealth of the Philippines
- Died: August 10, 2023 (aged 85); Philippines
- Occupations: Actor; director; newscaster
- Years active: 1960–2023
- Spouse: Barbara Perez (m. 1962)
- Children: 3
- Parent(s): Tito Arevalo (father); Guadalupe Francisco Ylagan (mother)

Robert Ylagan Arevalo (Tagalog pronunciation: [ʔɪˈlɐgan ʔɐˈrɛbɐlo]; born Robert Francisco Ylagan; May 6, 1938 – August 10, 2023) was a Filipino actor, news presenter, and director.

== Early life ==
Robert Arevalo was born as Robert Francisco Ylagan in Dumaguete, Negros Oriental on May 6, 1938. He was the son of Filipino film actor, composer, and musician Tito Arevalo and Guadalupe Francisco. His uncles included actor and director Angel Esmeralda, who was the father of actor Jay Ilagan, Gerardo de León, who was a national artist and an award-winning movie director, and actor and director Conrado Conde. He was also an uncle of actress Liberty Ilagan. He attended the Legarda Elementary School, San Beda College and Ateneo de Manila where he studied Business Administration.

== Career ==
Arevalo first began acting as a drama actor for Premiere Productions. His major screen debut was in Gerardo de Leon's Huwag Mo Akong Limutin (1960), which was banned by censors for perceived immoral themes. He later worked for an advertising agency and managed Channel 5 until the early 1970s. In 1977, Arevalo directed and starred in the action film Hubad Na Bayani (lit. 'Naked Hero'), which garnered him the first Catholic Mass Media Awards for Best Scriptwriter and Best Picture.

Aside from acting, Arevalo also served as the anchor of ABS-CBN's news bulletin Balita Ngayon along with Mel Tiangco. This followed after the station resumed broadcasting following the People Power Revolution in 1986, and lasted until the program's replacement by TV Patrol in 1987.

== Personal life ==
On August 11, 1962, Arevalo married Sampaguita Pictures actress Barbara Perez, with whom he had three children.

== Death ==
Arevalo died on August 10, 2023, at the age of 85 due to Parkinson's disease.

== Filmography ==
=== Film ===
- Huwag Mo Akong Limutin (1960)
- Noli Me Tángere (1961)
- The Moises Padilla Story (1961)
- Bangkay Kaming Hahakbangan (1961)
- El filibusterismo (1962)
- Mga Leon sa Lansangan (1962)
- Only the Brave Know Hell (aka The Ravagers) (1965)
- Ang Daigdig ng Mga Api (1965)
- Dahil sa Isang Bulaklak (1967); also as assistant director
- Pagdating sa Dulo (1971)
- Akin ang Huling Awit (1971)
- Hiwaga sa Pulong Pasig (1974)
- Sakada (1976) – Salvador "Badong" del Mundo
- Divorce, Filipino Style (1976)
- Hubad na Bayani (1977); also as director
- Gomburza (1977)
- Katawang Alabok (1978)
- Marupok, Mapusok, Maharot (1978)
- Sino'ng Pipigil sa Pagpatak ng Ulan (1979)
- Carnival Queen (1981)
- Santa Claus Is Coming to Town! (1982)
- Hindi Mo Ako Kayang Tapakan (1984)
- Working Girls (1984)
- Sangley Point Robbery (1985)
- Paradise Inn (1985)
- Miguelito: Batang Rebelde (1985)
- Bagong Hari (1986)
- Stolen Moments (1987)
- Walang Panginoon (1989)
- The Siege of Firebase Gloria (1989) – Colonel Cao Van
- Abot Hanggang Sukdulan (1989) – Ernesto
- Babayaran Mo ng Dugo (1989) – Rafael Alonzo
- "Ako ang Batas" -Gen. Tomas Karingal (1990)
- Ama... Bakit Mo Ako Pinabayaan? (1990)
- Takas sa Impierno (1991) – Sarge
- Capt. Jaylo: Batas sa Batas (1991) – Major Mendoza
- Uubusin Ko ang Lahi Mo (1991) – Fortunato Guerrero
- Aguila at Guerrero: Droga Terminators (1992)
- The Myrna Diones Story: Lord, Have Mercy! (1993)
- Alejandro "Diablo" Malubay (1993)
- The Vizconde Massacre: God, Help Us! (1993)
- Lipa "Arandia" Massacre: Lord, Deliver Us from Evil (1994)
- The Untold Story: Vizconde Massacre II – May the Lord Be with Us! (1994)
- Pangako ng Kahapon (1994)
- Maalaala Mo Kaya: The Movie (1994) – Miguel
- The Maggie dela Riva Story: God... Why Me? (1994)
- The Annabelle Huggins Story: Ruben Ablaza Tragedy – Mea Culpa (1995)
- Harvest Home (1995)
- The Lilian Velez Story: Till Death Do Us Part (1995)
- Bocaue Pagoda Tragedy (1995)
- Silakbo (1995) – Atty. Greg Macaspac
- The Jessica Alfaro Story (1995)
- Matimbang Pa sa Dugo (1995)
- Sa Aking mga Kamay (1996) – Rolando Galvez
- Mulanay: Sa Pusod ng Paraiso (1996)
- Tirad Pass: The Last Stand of Gen. Gregorio del Pilar (1996)
- Batas Ko Ay Bala (1996) – Gen. Madamba
- 'Wag Na 'Wag Kang Lalayo (1996) – Mr. Villaroman
- Damong Ligaw (1997)
- The Sarah Balabagan Story (1997) – Kareem
- Hiwaga ng Panday (1998)
- Birador (1998) as Mario
- Isusumbong Kita sa Tatay Ko... (1999) – Alfredo
- Madame X (2000) – Don Justo Florendo
- Kaaway Hanggang Hukay (2001) – Lt. Gen. George L. Montoya
- Pangako... Ikaw Lang (2001) – Papa
- Walang Iwanan... Peksman! (2002) – Helen's father
- Batas ng Lansangan (2002) – Ramon
- Ispiritista: Itay, May Moomoo (2005) – Señor Segundo
- Paraiso: Tatlong Kwento ng Pag-asa (2007)
- Gulong (2007)
- Fuchsia (2009) – Generoso
- Sabungero (2009)
- Dukot (2009)
- Sagrada Familia (2009)
- Two Funerals (2010)
- Manila Kingpin: The Asiong Salonga Story (2011) – Cando Salonga
- The Healing (2012) – Odong
- Sosy Problems (2012) – Mang Ador
- Where I Am King (2014)
- Ang Larawan (2017) – Don Perico

=== Television ===
Year	Title	Role
1986–1987	Balita Ngayon	News anchor
1987	TV Patrol	News anchor
1991	Maalaala Mo Kaya	Dadoy
1992–1997	Valiente	Ceson
2001–2003	Sa Dulo ng Walang Hanggan	Norberto Montenegro
2003–2004	Basta't Kasama Kita	Ignacio
2005	Magpakailanman: The Manny and Pie Calayan Story	
2006	Your Song Presents: Kung Paano	Antonio
2008	Lobo	Manolo Sebastian
2009	Tayong Dalawa	Greg Martinez
2009	May Bukas Pa	Berting Aragon
2010	Maalaala Mo Kaya: Diploma	Rolando
2010	Magkaribal	Ronaldo Valera
2011	Maalaala Mo Kaya: Pasaporte	Ador
2011–2012	Munting Heredera	Enrique Lobregat
2012	Makapiling Kang Muli	Florentino Caballero
2013	Indio	Cosme Delos Santos
2013	Genesis	Edgardo Sebastian
2014	Ang Dalawang Mrs. Real	Henry Gonzales
2015	Pepito Manaloto: Ang Tunay na Kwento	Gerry
2016	The Millionaire's Wife	Alfredo Vergara
2017	My Dear Heart	Albertus Camillus
2017	Hanggang Saan	Miguel Montecillo
2018	FPJ's Ang Probinsyano	Efren

== Awards ==
Year	Award-Giving Body	Category	Work	Result
1965	FAMAS Awards	Best Actor	Ang Daigdig ng mga Api	Won
1977	Manunuri ng Pelikulang Pilipino	Best Screenplay	Hubad na Bayani	Won
1990	1990 Metro Manila Film Festival	Best Supporting Actor	Ama, Bakit Mo Ako Pinabayaan?	Won
1994	Film Academy of the Philippines	Best Supporting Actor	Pangako ng Kahapon	Won
