= Maria Labo =

2015 Filipino film

- Theatrical release poster
- Directed by: Roi Vinzon
- Starring: Kate Brios Lenlen Frial; Levi Ignacio; Boy Roque; Miggs Cuaderno; Jestoni Alarcon; Rey "PJ" Abellana; Mon Confiado; Dennis Padilla; Sam Pinto; Rez Cortez
- Production company: Starbuilders Production
- Distributed by: Viva Films
- Release date: November 11, 2015
- Country: Philippines
- Language: Filipino

Maria Labo is a 2015 Philippine supernatural horror film directed by Roi Vinzon. It is based on a Philippine urban legend about an Overseas Filipino Worker believed to be an aswang known as "Maria Labo", who is said to have eaten her own children.

== Plot ==
Maria is a loving and dutiful wife to her husband Ermin, a police officer with whom she has two children named Pablo and Rosalinda. Facing financial problems after Maria loses her job, and Ermin not being able to support the family on a policeman's salary alone, Maria is convinced to become an Overseas Filipino Worker after learning that her high school friend Emily applied to become one as well. Ermin is hesitant with his wife's plans initially but eventually relents. Maria then goes to Dubai to work as a domestic worker and caregiver.

In Dubai, Maria befriends Nanay Leng, a fellow OFW. After buying groceries for her employer, Maria is raped in a van and is later found wandering. She is brought to a hospital, where the doctor recommends that she be returned to the Philippines. While hospitalized, Nanay Leng passes a curse to Maria. The curse, by opening her mouth and letting an orange entity inside hop out from her stomach and into Maria's, would eventually turn her into an aswang. In the process of transferring her power, Nanay Leng loses her immortality, and dies shortly after.

In the Philippines, Maria is transferred to a hospital in her native Capiz, where doctors conclude that she has amnesia and take note of her aggressive behavior. Ermin brings her back to their home, but a hospital employee discourages him due to their findings and says that his spouse might not even recognize him. Ermin eventually convinces the hospital to take her back home saying that it might bring her memories back.

Back at their house, Maria appears normal until she threatens her children with a knife for running around. Ermin learns of the incident, with Maria claiming that the action was not within her control. Alone, her aswang curse begins to take control over her until one day she kills her children and cooks them. When Ermin discovers what she has done, he repeatedly shoots her but she escapes as Ermin calls her a monster.

Ermin then buries their children. Shortly afterwards, he witnesses a remorseful Maria crying nearby when the aswang curse takes over once again. Maria receives a wound on her face after her husband hacks her face with a bolo knife and escapes once again.

Following her escape, rumors spread of an aswang causing terror throughout the town. Ermin consults an albularyo, who says there is nothing that can be done to return Maria back to normal. The police then pursue the aswang. After some encounters, Maria is killed. As an embalmer works on Maria's body, he finds out that her corpse is nowhere to be found, only to find her still alive.

== Cast ==
- Kate Brios as Maria / Maria Labo
- Jestoni Alarcon as Ermin
- Sam Pinto as Emily
- Dennis Padilla as Espiritista
- Mon Confiado as Policeman 1
- Baron Geisler as Policeman 2
- Rey "PJ" Abellana
- Rez Cortez
- Miggs Cuaderno as Pablo
- Lenlen Frial as Rosalinda
- Levi Ignacio as Kapitan 2
- Boy Roque as Hostage Taker

== Production ==
Roi Vinzon decided to come up with a film based on an urban legend of an Overseas Filipino Worker who is believed to have become an aswang who have killed and ate her own children. Vinzon heard of the story while he was in Bacolod and became interested in making an adaptation of the tale into a film. To avoid legal problems, the real name of the woman was not used in the film.

The tale is particularly well known in the Visayas and Mindanao regions. Labo is said to be from the Visayas region with various accounts saying that she came from either Iloilo, Capiz, or Sorsogon. It was rumored that Labo came to Davao in particular in the 1980s or 1990s. "Labo" is an Ilonggo word for "to hack"; according to the legend, Maria Labo was given a cut on her face by her husband after the former cooked and ate their children.

The film project later received funding from a group of investors from Starbuilders Production. The film is the first project of Starbuilders Production and also the first for Vinzon since 1998 when he directed Boy Indian. The film also had a comfortable but reasonable budget with Vinzon refusing to brand Maria Labo as an indie film.

The film was primarily shot in Mexico, Pampanga with some scenes shot in Dubai in the United Arab Emirates. Director Vinzon, a resident of Angeles, decided to shoot the film in the city because he found the place compatible to his ideas he has in mind for the film. Shooting in Dubai took a week to be completed.

Vinzon also said that the film did not rely much on special effects since he wanted the film to feel "natural" as possible.

== Release ==
Maria Labo was released in cinemas on November 11, 2015. The film was distributed by VIVA Films.
