= Blusang Itim =

2011 Philippine television drama series

- Title card
- Also known as: Beauty Within
- Genre: Drama
- Created by: Elena Patron
- Based on: Blusang Itim (1986) by Emmanuel H. Borlaza
- Written by: Richard "Dode" Cruz; Renato Custodio; Obet Villela; Geng Delgado
- Directed by: Jay Altarejos
- Creative director: Jun Lana
- Starring: Kylie Padilla
- Opening theme: "Maghihintay Ako sa 'Yo" by Mark Alain Echem
- Country of origin: Philippines
- Original language: Tagalog
- No. of episodes: 65

Production
- Executive producer: Joseph Aleta
- Editors: Robert Reyes; Jose Suner
- Camera setup: Multiple-camera setup
- Running time: 19–29 minutes
- Production company: GMA Entertainment TV

Original release
- Network: GMA Network
- Release: May 16 – August 12, 2011

Blusang Itim (transl. black blouse / international title: Beauty Within) is a 2011 Philippine television drama series broadcast by GMA Network. The series is based on a Philippine comic book by Elena Patron of the same title. Directed by Jay Altajeros, it stars Kylie Padilla. It premiered on May 16, 2011 on the network's Dramarama sa Hapon line up. The series concluded on August 12, 2011, with a total of 65 episodes.

The series is streaming online on YouTube.

== Overview ==
Blusang Itim was as a novel written by Elena Patron. It was serialized from 1981 to 1983. In 1986, it was adapted into a film by Seiko Films featuring Snooky Serna in the lead role.

== Cast and characters ==
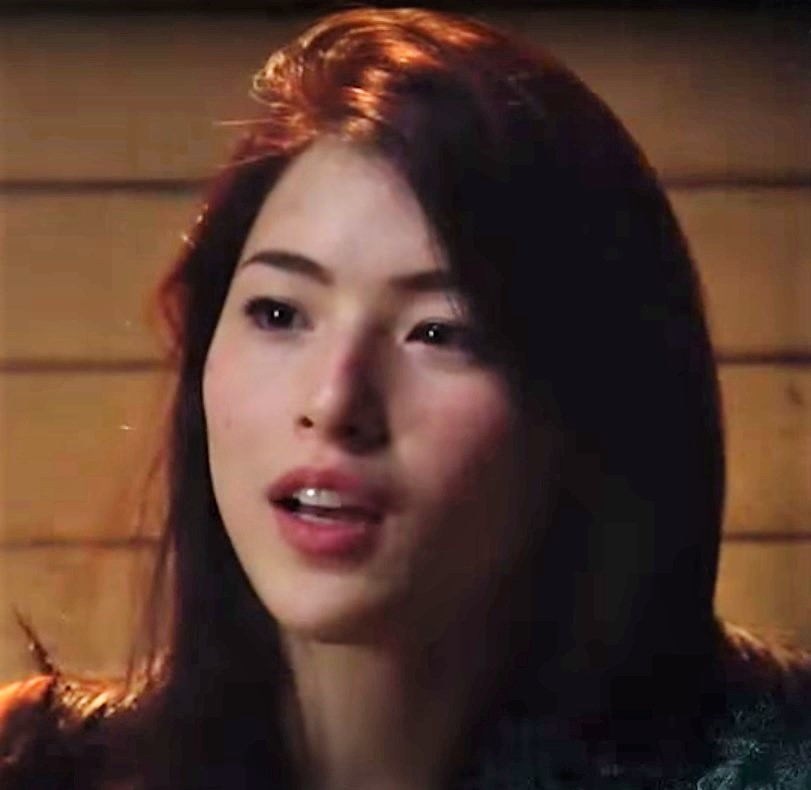
Kylie Padilla portrays Jessa Escote.

Lead cast

- Kylie Padilla as Jessa Escote-Soriano / Jessa Lopez-Santiago / Jessica Madrid

Supporting cast

- Carl Guevarra as Melchor Reyes
- Lucho Ayala as Edward Escote
- Frank Magalona as Angelo Soriano
- Wynwyn Marquez as Cleo Salcedo
- Andrea Torres as Alison Escote
- Marissa Delgado as Concha Lopez-Santiago
- Maritoni Fernandez as Victoria Soriano
- Rita Avila as Rhea Escote
- Jackie Lou Blanco as Esmeralda Lopez-Santiago
- Gary Estrada as Gerald Escote
- Maureen Mauricio as Elsa Reyes
- Chariz Solomon as Chiqui
- Rochelle Barrameda as Camille Santos
- Shirley Fuentes as Beth Santa Maria
- Rene Salud

Guest cast

- Sabrina Man as younger Jessa
- Arkin Magalona as younger Angelo
- JM Reyes as younger Melchor
- Snooky Serna as Loleng

== Casting ==
Sarah Lahbati, Gwen Zamora and Isabelle Daza were considered for the lead role for the television adaptation. Kylie Padilla later got the role.

== Ratings ==
According to AGB Nielsen Philippines' Mega Manila household television ratings, the pilot episode of Blusang Itim earned a 15.6% rating. The final episode scored an 18.5% rating.

== Accolades ==
Accolades received by Blusang Itim
Year	Award	Category	Recipient	Result	Ref.
2011	Golden Screen TV Awards	Outstanding Adapted Drama Series	Blusang Itim	Nominated	
2011	Golden Screen TV Awards	Outstanding Breakthrough Performance by an Actor	Frank Magalona	Nominated	
2011	Golden Screen TV Awards	Outstanding Breakthrough Performance by an Actress	Wynwyn Marquez	Nominated	
