= The Fatima Buen Story =

1994 biographical film by Mario O'Hara

- Directed by: Mario O'Hara
- Screenplay by: Frank Rivera
- Story by: Fatima Buen; Frank Rivera
- Produced by: Ronald Stephen Monteverde
- Starring: Kris Aquino
- Cinematography: Romulo Araojo
- Edited by: George Jarlego
- Music by: Nonong Buencamino
- Production company: Regal Films
- Distributed by: Regal Films
- Release date: July 27, 1994
- Running time: 105 minutes
- Country: Philippines
- Language: Filipino

The Fatima Buen Story is a 1994 Philippine biographical crime drama film directed by Mario O'Hara and written by Frank Rivera. The film stars Kris Aquino in the title role, the story is based on the actual case of Fatima Buen, a woman jailed for illegal recruitment.

The film is streaming online on YouTube.

== Cast ==
- Kris Aquino as Fatima Buen
  - Charlotte Lugo as Young Fatima
- Zoren Legaspi as Oscar Kintanar
- John Regala as Leslie Baron
- Janice de Belen as Batman
- Gina Pareño as Frank
- Perla Bautista as Corazon
- Leni Santos as Irene
- Shintaro Valdez as Date of Fatima
- Bob Soler as Mr. Dalo Periquet
- Naty Mallares as Lolal Felisa
- Noni Mauricio as Jake
- Carmen Enriquez as Aling Caring
- Dante Balois as Informer
- Brando Legaspi as Date of Fatima
- Josie Galvez as Comadrona
- Nonong de Andres as the Omen
- William Thayer as Mayor
- Judy Teodoro as Recruiter of Japayuki
- Gil Arceo as Warden
- Frank Rivera as Lawyer
- Enrico Salcedo as Lawyer
- Ruben O'Hara as Judge
- Yolly Palma as Asuncion
- Bennette Ignacio as Noel
- John Lester Hogan as Youngest son of Fatima
- Oscar Ramirez as Informer
- Alex Cunanan as Yakuza

== Critical response ==
Manila Standard opinion writer Ariel Bocobo gave a brief negative review of the film, stating that "[t]he only good part of the movie was the ending. The movie itself was a disaster."

Screenwriter Nestor U. Torre considered the film as among the few local films produced in 1994 that were "relatively choice". In 2002, film columnist Isah V. Red considered the film a classic. In 2006, filmmaker Jose Javier Reyes listed the film at no. 5 in his top 21 films of the past 21 years.

== Accolades ==
Year	Awards	Category	Recipient	Result	Ref.
1994	18th Gawad Urian Awards	Best Film	The Fatima Buen Story	Won	
1994	18th Gawad Urian Awards	Best Director	Mario O'Hara	Won	
1994	18th Gawad Urian Awards	Best Actress	Kris Aquino	Nominated	
1994	18th Gawad Urian Awards	Best Supporting Actor	John Regala	Won	
1994	18th Gawad Urian Awards	Best Supporting Actor	Zoren Legaspi	Nominated	
1994	18th Gawad Urian Awards	Best Supporting Actress	Janice de Belen	Nominated	
1994	18th Gawad Urian Awards	Best Supporting Actress	Gina Pareño	Nominated	
1994	18th Gawad Urian Awards	Best Screenplay	Frank Rivera	Won	
1994	18th Gawad Urian Awards	Best Cinematography	Romulo Araojo	Won	
1994	18th Gawad Urian Awards	Best Editing	George Jarlego	Won	
1994	18th Gawad Urian Awards	Best Sound	Joe Climaco	Won	
1994	18th Gawad Urian Awards	Best Production Design	Benjie de Guzman	Nominated	
1994	18th Gawad Urian Awards	Best Music	Nonong Buencamino	Nominated	
1994	4th YCC Awards	Best Achievement in Cinematography and Visual Design	Romulo Araojo; Benjie De Guzman	Won	
1994	4th YCC Awards	Best Achievement in Film Editing	George Jarlego	Nominated	
1994	4th YCC Awards	Best Achievement in Sound and Aural Orchestration	Nonong Buencamino; Joe Climaco	Nominated	
1994	43rd FAMAS Awards	Best Actress	Perla Bautista	Nominated	
