= The Medyo Late Night Show with Jojo A. =

Philippine television talk show

- Title card in 2014
- Also known as: Jojo A. All the Way! (2004–07; 2009–10); The Sobrang Gud Nite Show with Jojo A. All the Way! (2007–08); The Good Night Show (2008); The Medyo Late Night Show with Jojo A. (2010–15, 2018, since 2020)
- Genre: Late-night talk show
- Directed by: Bahjo Cabauatan
- Presented by: Jojo Alejar
- Country of origin: Philippines
- Original language: Tagalog

Production
- Producer: Jojo Alejar
- Production locations: Jojo Alejar's office (2004–05); Sofitel Philippine Plaza; RJ Bar or RJTV Studios, Makati (2005–07); Teatrino, Greenhills, San Juan (2007–08); Bigshot Billiards Studio (Delta Theater, Quezon City) (2008–09); JojoATV Entertainment Studios, Tomas Morato, Quezon City (2009–10); JojoATV Entertainment Studios, Grand Monaco Centre, Pittsburgh St, Cubao, Quezon City (2010–14); TV5 Media Center, Mandaluyong (2015); Semicon Corporate Building, Pasig (2018); RJ Bistro, Lower Level, Dusit Thani Manila, Makati (2020, since 2023)
- Running time: 60 minutes
- Production companies: JojoATV Entertainment, Inc. (2004–10); Bellhaus Entertainment, Inc. (2007–08); Blue Screen Entertainment (2009); JojoATV Productions and Events and PixelWorks, Inc. (2014); TV5 and JojoATV Productions and Events (2015); PTV 4 and JojoATV Group (2018); RJ Productions and JojoATV Group (2020, since 2023)

Original release
- Network: RJTV/RJ DigiTV (2004–07, 2020, since 2023); Q (2007–08); TV5 (2009–13, 2015); GMA Network (2014); PTV (2018)
- Release: May 10, 2004 – present

The Medyo Late Night Show with Jojo A. (formerly Jojo A. All the Way, The Sobrang Gud Nite Show with Jojo A. All the Way! and The Good Night Show) is a Philippine television talk show broadcast by RJTV, Q, TV5, GMA Network and PTV. Hosted by Jojo Alejar, it aired on RJTV from May 10, 2004 to October 5, 2007. The show moved to Q from October 8, 2007 to 2008, TV5 from June 1, 2009 to September 27, 2013, GMA Network from January 6 to December 5, 2014 and later returned to TV5 from May 11 to November 6, 2015, PTV from April 30 to November 16, 2018 and RJ DigiTV since February 6, 2020.

== Overview ==
The program debuted on RJTV as Jojo A. All the Way in 2004. The show was renamed The Sobrang Gud Nite Show with Jojo A. All the Way! after moving to Q (then GMA News TV, now GTV) on October 5, 2007. The show was renamed The Good Night Show in 2008.

The program reverted to its original title Jojo A. All the Way! when it moved to TV5 on June 1, 2009. The show ended on September 27, 2013, due to the network's lineup revamp.

On January 6, 2014, The Medyo Late Night Show with Jojo A. premiered on GMA Network It ran until on December 5, 2014.

On May 10, 2015, the program returned to TV5. On May 11, 2015, the program aired at 11:30 pm, also the show's 10th anniversary as the longest running comedy variety talk show on Philippine TV. On November 6, 2015, the show ended once again.

The program moved to PTV on April 30, 2018, airing at 11 pm. The show ran until November 16, 2018.

On February 6, 2020, the program returned to its original network, RJ DigiTV. The program aired live episodes every Thursday Night at 9 pm to 10 pm. On November 15, 2023, the show began airing live from RJ Bistro at Dusit Thani Manila.
