= Birthday Gift 2 =

- Directed by: Cesar S.B. Abella
- Screenplay by: R.J. Nuevas; Tony Y. Reyes
- Story by: Cesar S.B. Abella
- Produced by: Lily Monteverde; Tony Tuviera
- Starring: Sabrina M.
- Cinematography: Marissa Floirendo
- Edited by: Renewin Alano
- Music by: Michael Alba
- Distributed by: El Niño Films
- Release date: February 9, 2000 (Philippines)
- Running time: 110 minutes
- Country: Philippines
- Languages: English; Filipino

Birthday Gift 2 is a 2000 Filipino drama and erotic film directed by Cesar S.B. Abella. The premise of the film talks about incidents that mostly happen during a birthday celebration.

== Cast ==
- Sabrina M.
- Rey 'PJ' Abellana
- Melanie Gomez
- Fernando Montenegro
- Diego Salvador
- Abi Zabarte
