= Eh, Kasi Bata =

1992 science fiction film starring Gretchen Barretto

- Directed by: Efren Jarlego
- Written by: Cesar Cosme
- Starring: Gretchen Barretto; Romnick Sarmenta; Jennifer Sevilla; Billy Joe Crawford; Atong Redillas; Cesar Montano
- Cinematography: Clodualdo Austria
- Edited by: Edgardo Jarlego
- Music by: Rey Magtoto
- Production company: Seiko Films
- Distributed by: Seiko Films
- Release date: May 29, 1992
- Running time: 104 minutes
- Country: Philippines
- Language: Filipino

Eh, Kasi Bata (lit. 'Eh, Because Kid'; marketed as Eh, Kasi Bata!) is a 1992 Filipino science fiction comedy film directed by Efren Jarlego. The film stars Gretchen Barretto, Romnick Sarmenta, Jennifer Sevilla, Billy Joe Crawford, Atong Redillas, and Cesar Montano. Named after the song of the same name by Jaymie Baby Magtoto, it was produced by Seiko Films and released on May 29, 1992.

Critic Justino Dormiendo of the Manila Standard panned the film as "an infantile piece of movie trash" for its formulaic and "sickly" gags.

== Plot ==
Two female aliens land in the Philippines and hijinks ensue.

== Cast ==
- Gretchen Barretto
- Romnick Sarmenta
- Jennifer Sevilla
- Billy Joe Crawford as Daryll
- Atong Redillas
- Cesar Montano as Glen
- Nova Villa as Meldie
- Dencio Padilla
- Ramon Zamora as Frank Chavit
- Ruben Rustia
- Rez Cortez
- Berting Labra
- Don Pepot
- Danny Labra
- Rusty Santos
- Ben Sagmit
- Ernie David
- Dino Espiritu
- Jamie Baby Magtoto
- Jovit Moya
- Ike Lozada

== Critical response ==
Justino Dormiendo of the Manila Standard gave Eh, Kasi Bata a negative review, calling it "an infantile piece of movie trash." He severely criticized the film's formulaic gags as "sickly", stating that "[t]he scenario seems to have been concocted by the least developed brain in the universe as stock situation after stock situation [...] makes the jokes unfit for human consumption."
