= John Regala =

Filipino actor and environmentalist (1967–2023)

- Born: John Paul Guido Boucher Scherrer; September 12, 1967
- Died: June 3, 2023 (aged 55); Quezon City, Philippines
- Resting place: Manila Memorial Park – Sucat, Paranaque, Philippines
- Occupations: Actor, environmentalist
- Years active: 1985–2023
- Spouses: Aurina Manansala (m. 1996; ann. 2004) Victoria "Vicky/Gina" Alonzo (m. 2005; sep. 2020)

John Paul Guido Boucher Scherrer (September 12, 1967 – June 3, 2023), better known by his screen name John Regala, was a Filipino actor and environmentalist. He gained notoriety in the entertainment industry as a member of the 1986 television show That's Entertainment, and went on to play well-known antagonist roles in action movies and teleseries in the 1990s. He was sometimes unofficially tagged as the "Bad Boy" of Philippine action films along with fellow action stars like Robin Padilla and the late Ace Vergel.

Regala was one of the most gifted Filipino actors and most controversial actors in local showbusiness. In 1994, he was nominated for 'Best Supporting Actor' at the Gawad Urian Awards for his performance in The Fatima Buen Story. In 2011, he won 'Best Supporting Actor' at the 37th Metro Manila Film Festival for the film Manila Kingpin: The Asiong Salonga Story.

Regala is best known for his portrayals in Alyas Baby Face, Primitivo Ebok Ala: Kalaban Mortal ni Baby Ama, The Vizconde Massacre: God, Help Us! and Batas Ko Ay Bala.

== Career ==
Although he forayed in supporting or lead roles in Action or Crime flicks he was notably cast in Crime flicks in the 1990s such as Kunin Mo ang Ulo ni Ismael (1989) of Seiko Films and The Fatima Buen Story (1994) as an Anti Hero.

=== Mainstream success and hiatus ===
Regala entered showbusiness in the mid-1980s, becoming a member of That's Entertainment.

Regala became an action star in his first action film Boy Kristiano (1989). He then portrayed a villain role in the film Isa-Isahin ko Kayo (1990) alongside Ronnie Ricketts. He has also collaborated with action star Jeric Raval when he played the lead role as Marcial "Baby" Ama (Regala's late uncle) in the true to life action-drama film Primitivo Ebok Ala: Kalaban Mortal ni Baby Ama (1992). He played his role as Kris Aquino's rapist-killer in the true-to-life crime drama film The Vizconde Massacre: God Help Us (1993).

=== Return to acting ===
Regala returned to showbusiness and worked with Mart Escudero in the horror-comedy-thriller film Remington and the Curse of the Zombadings (2011). One of his most notable works was with his best friend Gov. ER Ejercito for the award-winning 2011 Metro Manila Film Festival Filipino action film Manila Kingpin: The Asiong Salonga Story (2011) while Regala himself won the best supporting actor award. He has also worked with JC de Vera and Oyo Sotto for the TV drama series Valiente of TV5 (2012). He was once again made famous on ABS-CBN when he worked with Kim Chiu and Maja Salvador in Ina, Kapatid, Anak (2013), and with Coco Martin in the action-fantasy drama TV series Juan dela Cruz (2013) and FPJ's Ang Probinsyano (2016).

== Personal life ==
Regala was the son of the late former character actor Mel Francisco and the late former actress Ruby Regala. His showbiz career stalled due to heavy drug abuse. Later, he went to drug rehabilitation center and became a born again Christian and eventually became a Christian minister. After some years of his life, he decided to become a member of the Iglesia ni Cristo. He later converted to Members Church of God International but went back to Iglesia ni Cristo in 2015. Regala became an environmentalist and worked as the president and CEO of Project Green Evolution, Inc., which produces the Water Bonsai Organic Root Grower.

== Illness and death ==
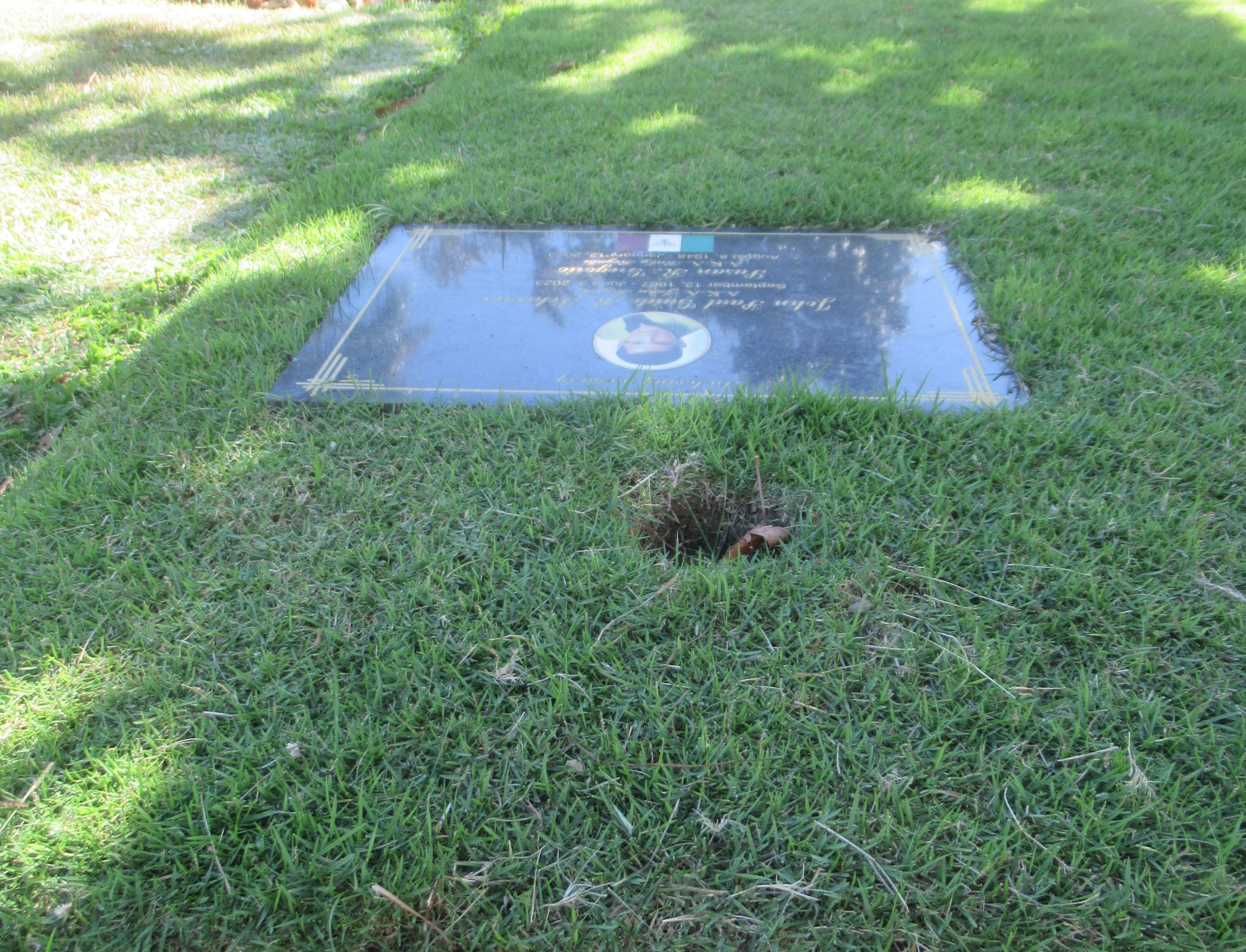
Ruby & John Regala's grave at Manila Memorial Park – Sucat.

In August 2020, Regala was hospitalized for cirrhosis of the liver. He died on June 3, 2023, from cardiac arrest brought on by liver and kidney complications.

== Filmography ==
=== Film ===
Year	Title	Role
1985	Bagets Gang	
1986	Kamandag ng Kris	
1986	The Life Story of Julie Vega	Joey
1987	Balandra Crossing	
1987	Bloody Mary: The Movie	
1988	Arturo Lualhati	
1988	Langit at Lupa	
1989	Walang Panginoon	
1989	Target... Central Luzon Bank Robbery	
1989	Lihim ng Golden Buddha	
1989	Ipaglalaban Ko!	
1989	Babayaran Mo ng Dugo	
1989	Boy Kristyano	Jamil/Boy Kristyano
1989	Wanted: Pamilya Banal	Jude Banal
1989	Ang Bukas Ay Akin	
1990	Kunin Mo ang Ulo ni Ismael	
1990	"Ako ang Batas" – Gen. Tomas Karingal	Young Tomas Karingal
1990	Kasalanan ang Buhayin Ka	Mateo Valdez
1990	Kristobal: Tinik sa Korona	
1990	Jabidah Massacre	
1990	Iisa-isahin Ko Kayo!	
1990	Huling Lalaki sa Bitayan	Julio
1990	Alyas Baby Face	
1990	Iputok Mo... Dadapa Ako! (Hard to Die)	
1991	Lintik Lang ang Walang Ganti!	
1991	Don Pepe	Don Pepe
1991	Boyong Mañalac: Hoodlum Terminator	Vargas
1991	Amok: Patrolman 2	Daniel Magtanggol
1991	Bukas... Tatakpan Ka ng Dyaryo!	
1992	Primitivo Ebok Ala: Kalaban Mortal ni Baby Ama	Marcial "Baby" Ama
1992	Jerry Marasigan, WPD	Winston
1992	The Vizconde Massacre: God, Help Us!	Jake
1992	Totoy Buang: Mad Killer ng Maynila	Totoy
1992	Tondo: Libingan ng Mga Siga	Willy Cuevas
1993	Kapatid Ko si Hudas	Rando
1993	Sgt. Lando Liwanag: Vengador (Batas ng Api)	Lando Liwanag
1993	Pambato	Arnold Alcantara
1994	Nandito Ako	Randy
1994	Tony Bagyo: Daig Pa ang Asong Ulol	Tony
1994	Angel Cremenal	Angel
1994	The Maggie dela Riva Story: God... Why Me?	Basílio Pineda Jr.
1994	The Fatima Buen Story	Leslie Baron
1994	Lipa "Arandia" Massacre: Lord, Deliver Us from Evil	The Killer / Gener
1994	Pards	
1995	Kana	
1995	Pamilya Valderama	Sonny Valderama
1995	Bukas Bibitayin si Itay	Elmo
1995	Cesar Hudas	Cesar
1996	Hindi Lahat ng Ahas Ay nasa Gubat	
1996	Sa Iyo ang Langit, sa Akin ang Lupa	
1996	Moises Arcanghel: Sa Guhit ng Bala	
1996	Batas Ko Ay Bala	Ringgo
1996	Batang Estero	
1996	Labanang Lalaki	Rex Robledo
1997	Si Mokong, si Astig, at si Gamol	
1997	Pards 2	
1997	Saturnino Archangel, Asal Demonyo	Saturnino Archangel
1997	Bobby Barbers: Parak	Jacinto
1997	Utang Ko sa Iyo ang Buhay Ko	
1997	Askal (Asong Kalye)	
1998	Lucio San Miguel: Walang Kaluluwa	Lucio San Miguel
1998	Squala	Jimbo
1998	Notoryus	
1999	Type Kita... Walang Kokontra!	Vernon
1999	Anino	Victor Velez
1999	Kahit Ako'y Tupang Itim, May Langit Din	Jun
2000	Col. Elmer Jamias: Barako ng Maynila	Bertin Andal
2001	Dudurugin Ko Pati Buto Mo	
2001	Parehas ang Laban	Brix Vergado
2001	Total Aikido	
2001	Pilak	
2004	Animal	Jako
2006	Ligalig	
2009	Kinatay	Sarge
2011	Remington and the Curse of the Zombadings	Ed
2011	The Road	Town police chief
2011	Manila Kingpin: The Asiong Salonga Story	Carlos "Totoy Golem" Capistrano
2012	El Presidente	Padre Agustin
2014	Muslim Magnum .357: To Serve and Protect	Rasheed Abdul-Salam
2015	Chain Mail	Alan
2015	One Day, Isang Araw, I Saw Nakakita	
2016	Tiniente Gimo	Gimo
2019	OFW: The Movie	Tatay Mando

=== Television ===
Year	Title	Role
1986–1988	That's Entertainment	Himself
1987	Salot: "Buong Mundo... Kaaway Ko"	
2005	Ang Mahiwagang Baul: "Ang Alamat ng Kawayan"	Sultan Kayan
2005	Encantadia	Apitong
2005–2006	Mga Anghel na Walang Langit	Harieto "Harry" Lopez
2006	Captain Barbell	Mayor Lazaro
2007	Impostora	Mando
2008	Joaquin Bordado	Cefiro
2008	Pieta	Miguel Alcona
2011	Pepito Manaloto	Architect Max Angeles
2012	Valiente	Peping
2013	Little Champ	Black Jack (voice)
2013	Ina, Kapatid, Anak	Emilio "Mio" Buenaventura
2013	Juan dela Cruz	Agor
2013	Tunay na Buhay	Himself
2014	Dyesebel	Badong Manansala
2014	Beki Boxer	Dalmacio
2014	Hawak Kamay	Leonardo Salonga
2015	Tonight with Arnold Clavio	Himself / Guest
2016	Ang Panday	David
2016	Ang Probinsyano	Congressman Randolph Subito
2017	Kapuso Mo, Jessica Soho	Himself

== Awards and nominations ==
Year	Award-giving Body	Category	Work	Result	Ref.
1994	Gawad Urian Award	Best Supporting Actor	The Fatima Buen Story	Nominated	
2011	Metro Manila Film Festival	Best Supporting Actor	Manila Kingpin: The Asiong Salonga Story	Won	
