= Cristina Crisol =

Filipina actress

Cristina Crisol (Jean Elizabeth May in real life) is a former film actress from the Philippines, known for her sex appeal.

In the 1980s, she appeared in movies like Kikirut-Kirot (1985) with Liz Alindogan and Edgar Mande, Uhaw Na Uhaw (1985) with Raoul Aragonn, Eden (1985) with Mark Gil, Nude City (1986) with Ernie Garcia and Sarsi Emmanuelle, Donselya (1986) with Zandro Zamora, Di Maghilom Ang Sugat (1986) with Anna Marie Gutierrez, Maureen Mauricio and Gino Antonio, and Paraisong Gubat (1986) with Azenith Briones, Josephine Manuel, Tanya Gomez and Lito Gruet.

Crisol is the daughter of a retired US Navy serviceman and a half Puerto-Rican mother. She was raised in Olongapo. She is now married to a construction worker, and they have two children. She has four children from different relationships and now lives a simple life in Masantol, Pampanga.

== Filmography ==
- Jerry Marasigan WPD (1992)
- Kumukulong Dugo (1991)
- May Butas Sa Dingding (1988)
- Paano Maibabalik Ang Nakaraan? (1987)
- Bodyguard: Masyong Bagwisa, Jr. (1986)
- Di Maghilom Ang Sugat (1986)
- Donselya (1986)
- Mababangis Na Bulaklak (1986
- Kulang Sa Dilig (1986)
- Paraisong Gubat (1986)
- Nude City (1986)
- Ang Galit Ko'y... Sumagad Sa Laman, Tumagos Sa Buto (1986)
- Unang Gabi (1986)
- Bomba Arienda (1985)
- Jimbo (1985)
- Eden (1985)
- Uhaw Na Uhaw (1985)
- Kikirut-kirot (1985)
- Mga Manikang Hubad (1985)
- Manoy, Hindi Ka Na Makakaisa (1985)
- Mga Babaeng Rehas (1985)
- Cop Brutus Logan, The Crime Buster (1985)
