= Apoy sa Lupang Hinirang =

1990 Philippine action film

- Directed by: Mauro Gia Samonte
- Screenplay by: Jose Carreon; Mauro Gia Samonte
- Story by: D. G. Salonga
- Based on: Tagalog Klasiks
- Produced by: Wally Chua; Victor Villegas
- Starring: Jestoni Alarcon; Rina Reyes; Bernard Bonnin
- Cinematography: Sergio Lobo
- Edited by: Danny Gloria
- Music by: Boy Alcaide
- Production company: Moviestars Production
- Distributed by: Moviestars Production
- Release date: September 26, 1990
- Running time: 110 minutes
- Country: Philippines
- Languages: Filipino; English

Apoy sa Lupang Hinirang is a 1990 Philippine political drama action film directed by Mauro Gia Samonte. The film stars Jestoni Alarcon, Rina Reyes and Bernard Bonnin.

== Cast ==
- Jestoni Alarcon as Berting
- Rina Reyes as Elena
- Bernard Bonnin as Don Franco
- Vanessa Escano
- Roselle Agana
- Toby Alejar
- Turko Cervantes
- Cris Daluz
- Joseph de Cordova
- Renato del Prado
- Patrick dela Rosa
- Flora Gasser
- Robert Miller
