= Jennifer Sevilla =

Filipino actress (born 1974)

- Born: May 14, 1974 (age 52); Quezon City, Philippines
- Occupations: Actress, model, businesswoman, entrepreneur
- Years active: 1978–present
- Spouse: Seymour Go (m. 2007)
- Children: 2

Jennifer Sevilla-Go (born May 14, 1974) is a Filipino actress in movies and television shows. She was a former member of That's Entertainment.

== Career ==
Sevilla started her Philippine showbiz career at age seven in a Jack 'n Jill snack food commercial in the early '80s. She starred in a movie, Kapitan Inggo (1984), that get her nominated as Best Child Actress for the Filipino Academy of Movie Arts and Sciences Awards (aka FAMAS Award). She became a mainstay of That's Entertainment, a youth-oriented TV variety show with fellow teen actors: Vina Morales, Keempee de Leon and Ian Veneracion.

During her teen years, she did more TV commercials for Colgate toothpaste and Newtex Napkins sanitary pads.

Sevilla is an actress for Seiko Film Productions, Inc. and played the third wheel to the Sheryl Cruz-Romnick Sarmenta loveteam movies. She starred in Puso Sa Puso (1988), Langit At Lupa (1989), and Guhit Ng Palad (1998).

She did in Kung Ako Na Lang Sana (2003) with Sharon Cuneta and Aga Muhlach under Star Cinema. She also did a film for Gawad Kalinga Paraiso: Tatlong Kwento Ng Pag-asa (2007) with Maricel Soriano.

== Filmography ==
=== Film ===
- Kapitan Inggo (1984)
- Kaya Kong Abutin ang Langit (1984)
- Nang Maghalo ang Balat sa Tinalupan (1984)
- Miguel Cordero (1984)
- Ina, Kasusuklaman Ba Kita? (1984)
- Mga Kuwento ni Lola Basyang (1984)
- Hindi Nahahati ang Langit (1985)
- Huwag Mo Kaming Isumpa (1986)
- Ayokong Tumungtong sa Lupa (1987)
- Ako si Kiko, Ako si Kikay (1987)
- Black Magic (1987)
- Huwag Mong Buhayin ang Bangkay (1987)
- Leroy Leroy Sinta (1988)
- Puso sa Puso (1988)
- Guhit ng Palad (1988)
- Hindi Tao, Hindi Hayop: Adventures of Seiko Jewels (1988)
- Mirror, Mirror on the Wall (1988)
- Langit at Lupa (1988)
- Pardina at ang Mga Duwende (1989)
- Anak ng Demonyo (1989)
- Kokak (1989)
- First Lesson (1989)
- Mundo Man Ay Magunaw (1990)
- Naughty Boys (1990)
- Alyas Baby Face (1990)
- Zaldong Tisoy (1991)
- Matud Nila (1991)
- Tukso Layuan Mo Ako! (1991)
- Mario Sandoval (1992)
- Eh, Kasi Bata (1992)
- Taong Gubat (1993)
- Love Notes (1995)
- Muling Umawit ang Puso (1995)
- Bridesmaids (1997)
- Ikaw Pala ang Mahal Ko (1997)
- Papunta Ka Pa Lang Pabalik na Ako (1997) Maricar
- Kay Tagal Kang Hinintay (1998)
- Kahapon, May Dalawang Bata (1999)
- The Kite (1999)
- Lagarista (2000)
- Sugatang Puso (2001)
- Till There Was You (2003)
- Kung Ako na Lang Sana (2003)
- Ang Huling Araw ng Linggo (2006)
- Super Noypi (2006)
- Paraiso: Tatlong Kwento ng Pag-asa (2007)
- Trespassers (2011)
- Call Me Mother (2025)

=== Television ===
- That's Entertainment (1988-1993)
- Lovingly Yours (1988-1996)
- Young Love Sweet Love (1988-1993)
- Saturday Entertainment (1988-1993)
- Abangan ang Susunod na Kabanata - Jenny (1991-1997)
- Reeling & Rockin' (IBC 13, 1992)
- Maalaala Mo Kaya - Limos (1993)
- Love Notes (1994)
- Noli Me Tangere (1995)
- 1896 (TV5, 1996)
- Kapag May Katwiran... Ipaglaban Mo! (1996)
- Tierra Sangre (TV series) (1996)
- Esperanza - Elaine de Leon Domingo / fake Socorro Salgado (1999)
- Maalaala Mo Kaya - Sugat (1998)
- Saan Ka Man Naroroon (1999)
- Sa Puso Ko Iingatan Ka (2001)
- Tabing Ilog (2001)
- Recuerdo de Amor - Janice (2001)
- Ikaw Lang ang Mamahalin (2001)
- Magpakailanman (2002-2004)
- Te Amo, Maging Sino Ka Man (2004)
- Saang Sulok ng Langit (2005)
- Bakekang (2006)
- Mga Kwento ni Lola Basyang - Ang Prinsipeng Mahaba Ang Ilong (2007)
- Pati Ba Pintig Ng Puso (2007)
- Maalaala Mo Kaya - Bracelet (2008)
- Rosalinda (2009)
- Hawak-Kamay (2014)
- Strawberry Lane (2014)
- Walang Tulugan with the Master Showman (2016)
- Love Thy Woman (2020)
- La Vida Lena (2020)
- Ang Probinsyano (2021)
- Teen Clash (2023)

== Awards and nominations ==
| Year | Award giving body | Category | Nominated work | Result |
|---|---|---|---|---|
| 1985 | FAMAS Award | Best Child Actress | Kapitan Inggo (1984) | Nominated |
| 1996 | Gawad Urian Award | Best Supporting Actress | Muling Umawit Ang Puso (1995) | Nominated |
| 1999 | FAMAS Award | Best Supporting Actress | Kay Tagal Kang Hinintay (1998) | Nominated |
| 2000 | Gawad Urian Award | Best Supporting Actress | Kahapon, May Dalawang Bata (1999) | Nominated |
| 2000 | FAMAS Award | Best Supporting Actress | Kahapon, May Dalawang Bata (1999) | Nominated |
