= Rita Avila =

Filipino actress and author

- Born: Ana Marie Errea; September 20, 1964 (age 62); Manila, Philippines
- Occupations: Actress, writer
- Years active: 1987–present
- Agent: Freelancer
- Spouse: F.M. Reyes (m. 2003)
- Children: 1

Ana Marie Errea (born September 20, 1964), known professionally as Rita Avila, is a Filipino actress and author.

== Career ==
She is a critically acclaimed film actress whose movies such as Stella Magtanggol (1992) and Tatlo, Magkasalo (1998) and The Flor Contemplacion Story (1995) have been looked over as historically recognizable in Philippine Cinema. In the late 1990s, she ventured more into drama soaps and anthology's as a supporting character or main protagonist or antagonist. She started her television career on GMA Network as part of That's Entertainment before transferring to ABS-CBN during 1995 though appeared in Anna Karenina. Avila returned to GMA-7 in 2001 and stayed there for nine years before going freelance.

== Personal life ==
Ávila is married to director Erick Reyes on January 19, 2003. Together, they had a baby named Elia Jesú E. Reyes. The baby died three weeks after being born. She also wrote an inspirational booklet called, 8 Ways to Comfort with Grace, which reflects on her grief over losing their three-week-old son. Other works include Si Erik Tutpik at si Ana Taba, a book for children who experience bullying, and The Invisible Wings, a fable that lets us see our world and our time as a likely place for angels. She later received a letter from Monsignor Peter B. Wells, an official of the Vatican Secretariat of State, expressing the Pope's gratitude for the books titled The Invisible Wings and 8 Ways to Comfort with Grace. She later released The Invisible Wings 2 along with her first novel, Wanna Bet on Love.

== Filmography ==
=== Film ===
Year	Title	Role	Ref(s).
1987	Bata-batuta		themoviedb.org
1987	Black Magic	Emma	
1987	Huwag Mong Buhayin ang Bangkay	Julie	
1988	Hiwaga sa Balete Drive	Sandy	
1989	Walang Panginoon	Loreta Montemayor	
1989	Mahirap ang Magmahal		
1989	Ipaglalaban Ko!		
1989	Babayaran Mo ng Dugo	Amelia	
1989	Kokak	Diwata	
1989	Bihagin ang Dalagang Ito!		
1990	Kunin Mo ang Ulo ni Ishmael		
1990	Kasalanan ang Buhayin Ka	Nancy	
1990	Mana sa Ina	Frida Perez	
1990	Machete, Istatwang Buhay	Lorna	
1990	Kristobal; Tinik sa Korona		
1990	Hindi Laruan ang Puso		
1990	Walang Awa Kung Pumatay	Kristie	
1990	Iputok Mo... Dadapa Ako!!! (Hard to Die)	Olga	
1991
1991	Mainit... Masarap... Parang Kaning Isusubo	Theresa	
1991	Bago Matapos ang Lahat		
1991	Akin Ka... Magdusa Man Ako!		
1991	Sumayaw Ka Salome	Salome	
1992	Nang Gabing Mamulat si Eba (Jennifer Segovia Story)		
1992	Magsisimba Kang May Bulak sa Ilong		
1992	Alyas Stella Magtanggol	Stella Magtanggol	
1992	Alyas Pogi 2	Divina	
1992	Takbo... Talon... Tili!!!	Michelle	
1995	The Flor Contemplacion Story	Evangeline Parale	
1995	Ang Tipo Kong Lalake (Maginoo pero Medyo Bastos)	Demi	
1995	Muling Umawit ang Puso	Glenda Andrada	
1997	The Sarah Balabagan Story	Amy	
1998	Puso ng Pasko	Christy Carpio	
1999	Soltera	Lorraine	
2002	Bakat	Marites	
2002	Biyahera	Lorraine	
2006	Nasaan si Francis?	Lin-Lin	
2010	Magdamag	Soledad Arvis	
2010	Rosario	The Helper	
2010	Shake, Rattle and Roll 12	Dorothy Cruz	
2014	The Commitment	Paolo's mother	
2017	Tatlong Bibe	Viring	
2020	Suarez: The Healing Priest	Azucena Suarez	
2025	The Time That Remains		

=== Television ===
Year	Title	Role
1987–1996	That's Entertainment	Herself
1987	Salot: "Sindak"	
1995–1996	Familía Zaragoza	Vivian Zaragoza
1995	Ipaglaban Mo: Kailan ang Simula, Kailan ang Wakas?	
1996–2002	Anna Karenina	
1999–2001	Marinella	Marisa Rodríguez / Michelle dela Cruz
2001–2002	Ikaw Lang ang Mamahalin	Corrine Martinez
2002–2003	Kahit Kailan	Dolores
2004	Ikaw sa Puso Ko	
2006	Agawin Mo Man ang Lahat	Clara
2007	Super Twins	Victoria Vergara
2007–2008	Marimar	Lupita Aldama
2007–2008	Sine Novela: My Only Love	Camille
2008	Sine Novela: Magdusa Ka	Victoria "Toyang" Salvador
2008–2009	Luna Mystika	Diana Sagrado
2009	Mars Ravelo's Darna	Alicia
2010	Sine Novela: Basahang Ginto	Ising Dimarucot
2010	Bantatay	Clarita
2010	1DOL	Sandra Rosales
2010	Wansapanataym: Bandanang Itim	Luisa
2010–2011	Sabel	Margaret De Dios-Sandoval
2011	Elena M. Patron's Blusang Itim	Rhea Escote
2011	100 Days to Heaven	Cecilia Salvador
2012	Walang Hanggan	Jane Bonifacio-Montenegro
2012–2013	Sana ay Ikaw na Nga	Mariana Fulgencio
2013	Never Say Goodbye	Glenda Maglungsod / Greta Pendelton
2013	Kahit Nasaan Ka Man	Delia
2013	Genesis	Perla Balmide
2013	Magpakailanman: Lola Putol	Lola Ning
2014	Innamorata	Claire Cunanan / Alice Manriquez
2015	Magpakailanman: Ama Namin	Lolita
2015	Maalaala Mo Kaya: Watawat	Victoria Erana
2015	Ipaglaban Mo: Nasa Maling Landas	Magda
2015	Let the Love Begin	Sophie V. Sta. Maria
2016	Hanggang Makita Kang Muli	Glenda Manahan
2016–2017	Magpahanggang Wakas	Rosita "Rosing" Berdero-Natividad
2017	Ipaglaban Mo: Saklolo	Fely Cruz
2017	Magpakailanman: Jalei Love Story	Guest Cast
2017	Super Ma'am	Chieftain Lorenza Manalo
2018	Eat Bulaga's Lenten Special: Taray ni Tatay	Gina
2018	Tonight with Boy Abunda	Guest
2018	Precious Hearts Romances Presents: Araw Gabi	Odessa Olvidar / Celestina de Alegre
2019	Hiram na Anak	Hilda Sandejo
2019	Maalaala Mo Kaya: Sinturon	Leonida
2019	Ipaglaban Mo: Desperada	Layla
2019	Maalaala Mo Kaya: Colored Pens	Alps
2019	The Haunted	Anita Robles
2020–2021	Ang sa Iyo ay Akin	Belen "Bel" Ceñidoza-Zikiri
2021	Maalaala Mo Kaya: Mesa	Ivy
2021	Maalaala Mo Kaya: Entablado	Ivy
2021	Las Hermanas	Mildred Manansala
2022	Flower of Evil	Gloria Castillo
2023	Hearts on Ice	Yvanna Campos
2024	Black Rider	Rosa Rodriguez
2024–2025	Lilet Matias: Attorney-at-Law	Lorena Sanchez-de Leon
2026	Rainbow Rumble	Contestant
2026	Someone, Someday	Mariela Mercado / Georgia Ferrer

== Accolades ==
Awards and nominations received by Rita Avila
Award (Note: Awards, festivals, honors and other miscellaneous organizations are listed in alphabetical order.)	Year (Note: Indicates the year of ceremony. Each year is linked to the article about the awards held that year, wherever possible.)	Nominated work	Category	Result	Ref.
Asian Television Awards	1997	Alitaptap sa Gabing Madilim	Best Actress	Won	
Asian Television Awards	2000	Marinella	Best Supporting Actress	Nominated	
Gawad Urian	1996	The Flor Contemplacion Story	Best Supporting Actress	Nominated	
Gawad Urian	2011	Magdamag	Best Actress	Nominated	
Star Awards for Television	2025	Magpakailanman: "Ina Ka ng Anak Mo"	Best Single Performance by an Actress	Nominated	
