= Jestoni Alarcon =

Filipino actor and politician (born 1964)

The Honorable Jestoni Alarcon
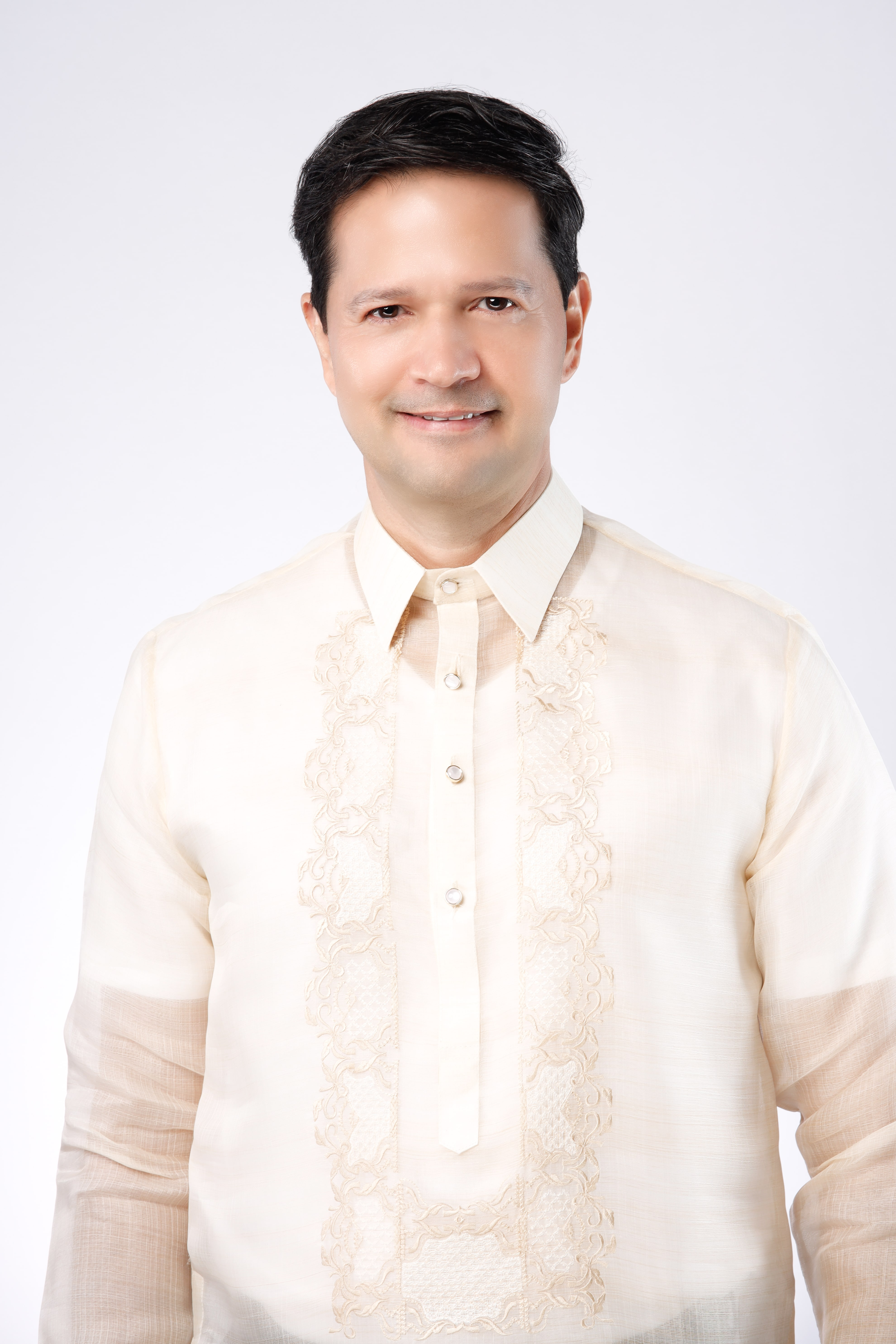
- Official portrait, 2025

Member of the Rizal Provincial Board from the 1st district
- Incumbent
- Assumed office June 30, 2025
- In office June 30, 2013 – June 30, 2022

12th Vice Governor of Rizal
- In office June 30, 2004 – June 30, 2007
- Governor: Casimiro Ynares Jr.
- Preceded by: Jovita Rodriguez
- Succeeded by: Frisco San Juan Jr.

Member of the Antipolo City Council
- In office June 30, 2001 – June 30, 2004

Personal details
- Born: Anthony Jesus Solero Alarcon; January 10, 1964 (age 62) Quezon City, Philippines
- Party: NPC (2004–2010; 2012–present)
- Other political affiliations: Independent (2010–2012); Lakas (2001–2004)
- Spouse: Lizzette Capili (m. 1991)
- Children: 3, including Angela
- Profession: Actor, politician

Military service
- Allegiance: Philippines
- Branch/service: Philippine Army

Anthony Jesus Solero Alarcon (born January 10, 1964), known professionally as Jestoni Alarcon, is a Filipino actor and politician. He served as a councilor in Antipolo from 2001 to 2004 and as the vice governor of Rizal from 2004 to 2007. In 2013, he won as a board member of the 1st District of Rizal. He also received the Eastwood City Walk of Fame star in 2014, for his success and accomplishments in the show business.

== Political views ==
In 1986, Alarcon campaigned for the reelection of president Ferdinand Marcos in the 1986 snap election.

== Personal life ==
On December 5, 1991, he married Lizzette D. Capili. They have three children including Angela, who also became an actress.

== Filmography ==
=== Film ===
Year	Title	Role
1984	Campus Beat	Debut film
1984	Kung Kaya Kong Abutin ang Langit	
1985	Naked Paradise	
1985	Paradise Inn	
1986	The Life Story of Julie Vega	Jonathan "Noni" Postigo
1986	Payaso	
1987	The Sisters	Dennis
1987	Di Bale Na Lang	Honesto
1987	Bloody Mary: The Movie	
1987	Ako si Kiko, Ako si Kikay	
1987	Black Magic	Victor Bulaklak
1987	Huwag Mong Buhayin ang Bangkay	Robertito
1988	Leroy Leroy Sinta	
1988	Rock-a-Bye Baby: Tatlo ang Daddy	
1988	Hiwaga sa Balete Drive	
1988	Mirror, Mirror on the Wall	
1988	Magkano ang Iyong Dangal?	
1989	Walang Panginoon	Criz
1989	Ang Lihim ng Golden Buddha	Rogelio Roxas
1989	Babayaran Mo ng Dugo	Sid Alonzo
1989	Mula Paa Hanggang Ulo	Eric
1989	Ang Bukas Ay Akin	Mael
1990	Kunin Mo ang Ulo ni Ismael	
1990	Kristobal: Tinik sa Korona	
1990	Apoy sa Lupang Hinirang	
1990	Ama... Bakit Mo Ako Pinabayaan?	
1991	Alyas Dodong Guwapo	Dodong
1991	Onyong Majikero	Pancho
1991	Ilalaban Kita ng Patayan	Bobby Santos
1992	Magsimba Kang May Bulak sa Ilong	Julio
1992	Lumaban Ka Itay	Ricarte Santiago
1992	Eddie Tagalog: Pulis Makati	Lt. Eddie Tagalog
1992	Jerry Marasigan, WPD	Jerry Marasigan
1992	Canary Brothers ng Tondo	
1992	Kapag Nabigo ang Batas	Benson Aguilar
1993	Lumaban Ka ...Itay!	
1993	Lt Col. Alejandro Yanquiling, WPD	Alex Yanquiling
1993	Sgt. Alvarez: Ex-Marine	Sgt. Alvarez
1994	Johnny Tiñoso and the Proud Beauty	
1994	Alyas Totoy: Kamay Na Bakal ng WPD	Alyas Totoy
1994	God Saves the Babies	Col. Arnel Gonzales
1995	Dog Tag: Katarungan sa Aking Kamay	Dante
1995	Dodong Scarface	Dodong Scarface
1995	Di Mapigil ang Init	
1996	Diego	Diego
1996	Mga Nagbabagang Labi	
1996	Kagat	
1996	Bitag, Babae at Bala	
1996	Labanang Lalaki	
1997	Anghel de Jesus, Masikip ang Mundo para sa Iyo	
1997	Amanos, Patas Na ang Laban	Lando
1997	Tekkie	
1997	Sgt. Victor Samson: Akin ang Batas	Sgt. Victor Samson
1998	Laban Ko Ito... Walang Dapat Madamay	Mando
1998	Batas Ko ang Uusig	Cain
1999	Resbak, Babalikan Kita	Brando
2000	Makamandag Na Bala	Carding
2001	Apoy sa Karagatan	Johnny
2001	Huli sa Akto	Marasigan
2003	The Legend: Tomagan	General Romeo Maganto
2003	Ang Tanging Ina	Francisco "Kiko" C. Montecillo
2010	Super Inday and the Golden Bibe	Franco
2010	Ang Tanging Ina Mo (Last na 'To!)	Kevin
2012	Suddenly It's Magic	Governor Ramirez
2013	Sa Dulo ng Ganti	Ramon
2013	Call Center Girl	Raul Manlapat
2013	Pedro Calungsod: Batang Martir	Captain Juan de Sta. Cruz
2015	Maria Labo	Ermin
2022	Yorme: The Isko Domagoso Story	Wowie Roxas

=== Television / digital series ===
Year	Title	Role	Notes
1986	That's Entertainment	Himself / Host	
1989	Balintataw	Ka Elias	Episode: "Ka Elias"
2000–02	Pangako Sa 'Yo	Diego Buenavista	
2002–03	Bituin	Bienvenido Galang	
2003–04	Twin Hearts	Renan Fontanilla	Antagonist
2005	Sugo	Rodolfo	
2006	Komiks Presents: Kamay ni Hilda	Greg	Antagonist
2007–08	MariMar	Don Gustavo Aldama	
2008	Iisa Pa Lamang	Vernon Fuentes	Antagonist
2008–09	Carlo J. Caparas' Pieta	Delfin Torres	
2009–10	Mars Ravelo's Darna	Simon	
2009	Stairway to Heaven	Jovan Reyes	Protagonist
2010	Beauty Queen	Himself/Judge	
2011	Dwarfina	Ditu Calixto	
2011	Rod Santiago's The Sisters	Eduardo Santiago	
2012	My Beloved	Archangel	
2012	Felina: Prinsesa ng mga Pusa	Emilio Flores	
2012	Makapiling Kang Muli	Serafin Angeles	
2012–13	Sana ay Ikaw na Nga	Dr. Ricardo Peron	
2013	Muling Buksan ang Puso	Nicholas Salazar / Ricardo Espinosa	Antagonist
2013	Maalaala Mo Kaya: Medalya	Father of Carlos	
2013–14	Adarna	Simon	
2014	Niño	Henry	
2016	Magpakailanman: Ang Sundalong Magiting	Sgt. Garcia	
2016	A1 Ko Sa 'Yo	Ryan	
2016	Encantadia	Armeo	
2017	FPJ's Ang Probinsyano	Javier Enriquez	Antagonist
2017	D' Originals	Lando Magpayo	
2018	The Blood Sisters	Norman Almeda	Anti-Hero
2018–19	My Special Tatay	Edgardo "Edgar" Villaroman	Protagonist
2019–20	One of the Baes	Steve Altamirano	
2022	Little Princess	Marcus Montivano	
2022	First Lady	Anastacio	
2023	Luv Is: Love at First Read	Hector Pereseo	
2024	Walang Matigas na Pulis sa Matinik na Misis	Police Col. Gener Alberto	Supporting Cast / Protagonist
2024	Black Rider	Antonio "Amang" Rodriguez	Supporting Cast / Antagonist
2025	Incognito	Gen. Donnie Novilla	Protagonist
