= Gloria Romero on screen and stage =

Filipino actress filmography

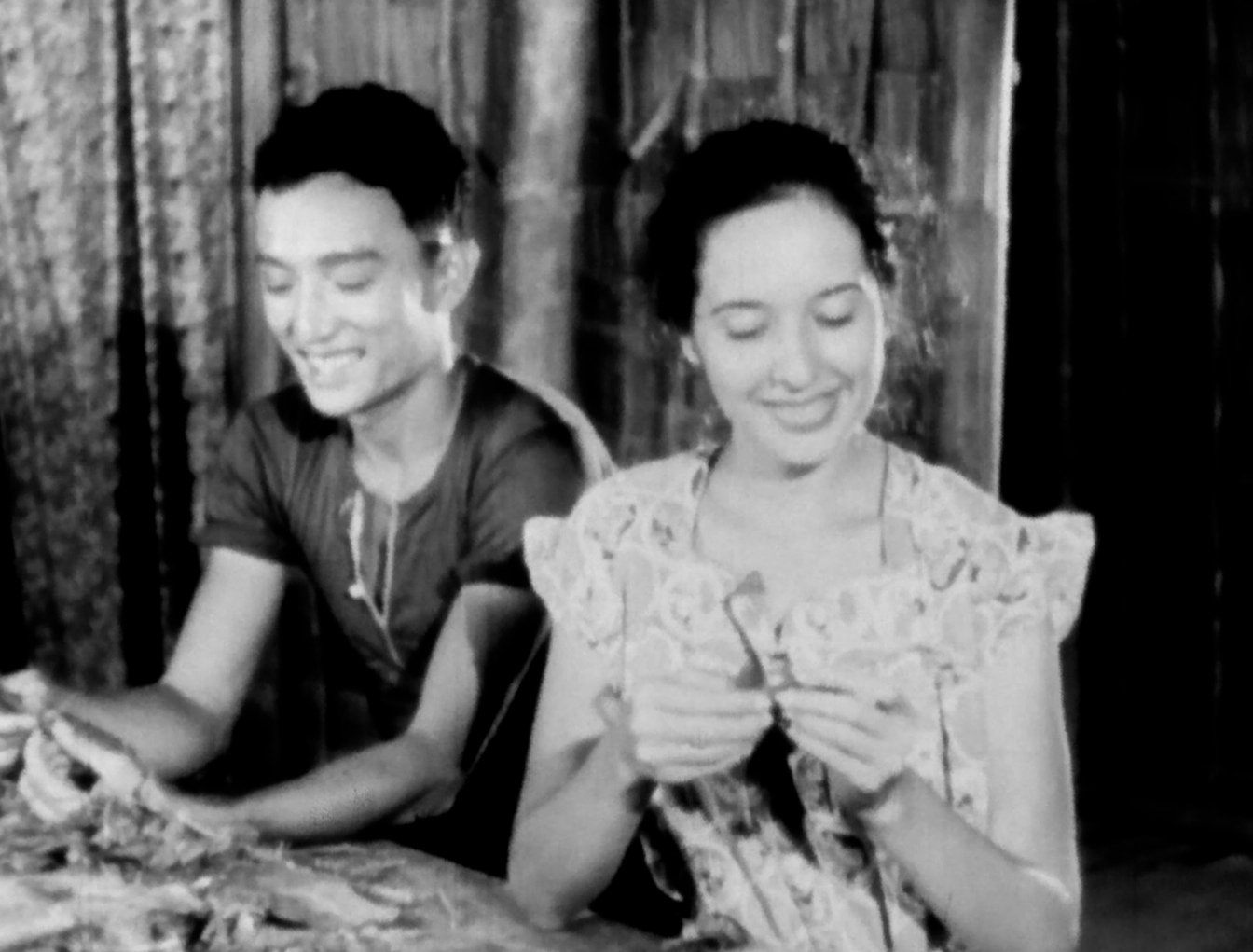
Dolphy (left) and Romero (right) in the 1954 landmark film Dalagang Ilocana.

Gloria Romero (December 16, 1933 – January 25, 2025) was an American-born Filipino actress who appeared in around 300 film and television productions throughout her career that spanned seven decades. She began appearing as a background actor in the late 1940s until her first major film part in Madame X (1952). Her major breakthrough came later that year with starring roles in Monghita and Palasig. She steadily gained fame and success in the succeeding years and expanded her work to radio and theater. According to St. Petersburg Times, her films during the first Golden Age of Philippine cinema were all commercially successful throughout Asia.

From 1950s to 1960s, Romero achieved great success at the box-office through her starring roles in romantic comedies, films based on comic strips and remakes of pre-war musical films: Cofradia (1953), Pilya (1954), Musikong Bumbong (1954), Dalagang Ilocana, where she won the FAMAS Award for Best Actress, Kurdapya (both in 1954), Despatsodora (1955), Mariposa (1955), Vacacionista (1956), Miss Tilapya (1956), Hongkong Holiday (1957), Sino ang Maysala?, which was the highest grossing film of 1957 in the Philippines, Paru-parong Bukid (1957), Alaalang Banal (1958) and Ikaw Ang Aking Buhay (1959) for which she earned FAMAS Award for Best Actress nominations, Hani-hanimun (1961), Iginuhit ng Tadhana (1965), and Pinagbuklod ng Langit (1969).

She continued playing lead and supporting roles of varying genres in the following years: For You, Mama (1970), Lumuha Pati Mga Anghel, Nardong Putik (both in 1972), Lipad, Darna, Lipad!, Pepeng Agimat (both in 1973), Karugtong ang Kahapon (1975), Sakada (1976), Gaano Kadalas ang Minsan? (1982) and Exploitation (1983). She received critical praise for her performances in Condemned (1984), Saan Nagtatago ang Pag-ibig? (1987), Nagbabagang Luha (1988) and Bilangin ang Bituin sa Langit (1989). In 1987, she ventured television through the sitcom Palibhasa Lalake and simultaneously appeared in a number of film and television productions in the 1990s, such as Familia Zaragoza (1996) and Labs Ko Si Babe (1999).

Romero's career saw a resurgence in the early 2000s with starring roles in the blockbusters Tanging Yaman (2000) and Bahay ni Lola (2001). She began appearing more often in a number of television series in the succeeding years and earned recognition for her roles in I Think I'm in Love (2002), Magnifico (2003), Fuchsia (2009), Tarima (2010) and Rainbow's Sunset (2018), where she won Best Actress at the International Film Festival Manhattan and Metro Manila Film Festival. From 2017 to 2020, she presented the fantasy anthology Daig Kayo ng Lola Ko. The films she appeared in have reportedly generated billions throughout her career, making her one of the highest grossing box office stars of all time.

== Film ==
=== 1940s ===
Gloria Romero's film credits
Year	Title	Role	Notes	Ref(s)
1944	Liwayway ng Kalayaan	Background actor		
1949	Ang Lumang Bahay sa Gulod	Background actor		

=== 1950s ===
Gloria Romero's film credits
Year	Title	Role	Notes	Ref(s)
1951	Prinsipe Don Juan			
1951	Bahay na Tisa			
1951	Bernardo Carpio			
1951	Kasintahan sa Pangarap			
1951	Kasaysayan ni Dr. Ramon Selga			
1951	Prinsesa at ang Pulubi			
1951	Dugong Bughaw			
1951	Anghel ng Pag-ibig			
1952	Rebecca			
1952	Kerubin			
1952	Tulisang Pugot			
1952	Barbaro			
1952	Madame X			
1952	Palasig	Florinda		
1952	Monghita			
1952	Siklab sa Batangas			
1953	Cofradia	Cofradia		
1953	Apat na Taga			
1953	May Umaga pang Darating			
1953	Mister Kasintahan			
1953	Hercules			
1953	Recuerdo			
1954	Musikong Bumbong			
1954	Pilya			
1954	Dalagang Ilocana	Biday		
1954	Ang Biyenang Hindi Tumatawa	Trining		
1954	Anak sa Panalangin	Nita/Lita		
1954	Kurdapya			
1955	Artista			
1955	Mariposa	Mariposa		
1955	Despatsodora			
1955	Hindi Basta-basta			
1955	Hootsy Kootsy			
1955	Bim Bam Bum			
1956	Vacacionista			
1956	Teresa	Teresa		
1956	Señorita			
1956	Miss Tilapia			
1956	Pagdating ng Takipsilim			
1957	Hongkong Holiday	Ana		
1957	Sino ang Maysala?	Gloria		
1957	Colegiala			
1957	Eternally			
1957	Paru-parong Bukid			
1957	Mga Anak ng Diyos			
1958	Mga Reyna ng Vicks	Luisa Estrella		
1958	Beloved			
1958	Mga Kwento ni Lola Basyang	Segment: "Ang Prinsesang Naging Pulubi"		
1958	Dewey Boulevard			
1958	Alaalang Banal			
1958	Pagoda			
1958	Palaboy			
1959	Kahapon Lamang			
1959	Wedding Bells			
1959	Ikaw ang Aking Buhay			
1959	Pangarap Ko'y Sa'yo Lamang			
1959	Pitong Pagsisisi			
1959	Sa Libis ng Nayon			
1959	Vicky			

=== 1960s ===
Gloria Romero's film credits
Year	Title	Role	Notes	Ref(s)
1960	Lawiswis Kawayan			
1960	Lupa sa Lupa			
1960	Sumpaan Natin			
1960	Pagpatak ng Ulan			
1960	7 Amores			
1960	Ang Inyong Lingkod, Gloria Romero			
1961	Alyas Sakay			
1961	Apat Na Yugto ng Buhay			
1961	Hani-hanimun			
1961	Serenata			
1961	Mother Dearest			
1962	Mga Anak ng Diyos			
1962	Tugtuging Bukid			
1962	Hampaslupang Anghel			
1962	Nagbalik na Kahapon			
1963	Esperanza at Caridad			
1963	Haliging Bato			
1963	Dance-O-Rama			
1963	Sinisinta Kita			
1963	Ikaw at Ikaw Rin			
1963	Anak, Ang Iyong Ina			
1964	Ang Rosaryo at ang Tabak			
1964	Fighting Warays sa Ilokos			
1964	Jukebox Jamboree			
1964	Show of Shows			
1964	Mga Kanyon ng Corregidor			
1965	Iginuhit ng Tadhana (The Ferdinand E. Marcos Story)	Imelda Marcos		
1965	Eskuwelahang Munti			
1965	Paano Kita Lilimutin			
1965	Alaala ng Lumipas			
1965	Hamon sa Kampeon			
1965	Kung Wala na ang Pagibig			
1965	Bakit Kita Iibigin?			
1966	Miranda: Ang Lagalag na Sirena			
1966	Pitong Gabi sa Hong Kong			
1966	Bakit Pa Ako Isinilang?			
1966	Sabado ng Gabi, Linggo ng Umaga			
1966	Till The End of Time			
1966	Huwag Kang Sumingit			
1966	Paano Kita Lilimutin			
1967	Hinango Kita sa Lusak			
1967	Anong Ganda Mo			
1967	Kaibigan kong Sto. Niño	Marta		
1967	Love, This is My Song			
1967	Bukod Kang Pinagpala			
1967	Somewhere, My Love			
1967	Dalawang Mukha ang Pag-ibig			
1967	Nag-aapoy na Dambana			
1968	De Colores			
1968	Liku-likong Landas			
1968	Kamatayan Ko ang Ibigin Ka			
1968	Batang Muntinlupa			
1969	Paula			
1969	Patria Adorada: Dugo ng Bayani			
1969	Pinagbuklod ng Langit	Imelda Marcos		
1969	Danny Boy	Sister Flora		

=== 1970s ===
Gloria Romero's film credits
Year	Title	Role	Notes	Ref(s)
1970	Haydee			
1970	For You, Mama			
1970	Lord Forgive Me			
1971	Robina	Auring		
1971	Lumuha Pati Mga Anghel	Tinay		
1971	Pagdating sa Dulo			
1971	Daluyong			
1971	Avenida Boy			
1971	Banal na Pag-ibig			
1971	Kung Anong Puno, Siyang Bunga			
1972	Nardong Putik			
1972	My Blue Hawaii			
1972	Destiny of the Living Dead			
1972	Just Married, Do Not Disturb			
1973	Lipad, Darna, Lipad!			
1973	Pepeng Agimat			
1973	Fight Batman Fight!			
1973	Anak ng Aswang			
1973	Cofradia			
1974	Bandila ng Magigiting			
1974	Ang Bituin at Araw			
1974	Huwag Tularan: Pito ang Asawa Ko			
1974	Shazam Boom			
1975	The Witch			
1975	Nakakahiya?			
1975	Karugtong ang Kahapon			
1975	San Simeon			
1975	Niño Valiente			
1975	Ang Kailangan Ngayon ng Daigdig ay Pag-ibig			
1975	Happy Days Are Here Again			
1976	Sakada	Doña Consuelo Montemayor		
1976	Ganito Kami Noon... Paano Kayo Ngayon?			
1976	Makahiya at Talahib	Aling Idad		
1976	Isinumpa			
1976	Daigdig ng Lagim			
1976	Ligaw Tingin, Halik Hangin			
1976	Hindi Nakakahiya Part II			
1978	Nasa Lupa ang Langit at Imperyno			
1978	Isang Ama Dalawang Ina			
1979	Bakit May Putik ang Bulaklak?			
1979	Biyak na Manyika			

=== 1980s ===
Gloria Romero's film credits
Year	Title	Role	Notes	Ref(s)
1980	Kasal?	Elisa		
1981	Kamay ni Hilda			
1982	Mother Dear	Elena		
1982	Just Say You Love Me			
1982	Gaano Kadalas ang Minsan?			
1983	To Mama with Love	Amelia		
1983	Kickouts: The Inside Story			
1983	Exploitation	Virginia		
1983	Hula		Guest appearance	
1984	Condemned	Connie		
1984	Teenage Marriage	Mrs. Alonzo		
1984	Kung Mahawi Man ang Ulap	Minda Acuesta		
1984	Bulaklak sa City Jail	Patricia's mother		
1984	Anak ni Waray vs. Anak ni Biday	Ilocano Manang Biday		
1984	Dear Mama			
1984	Sinner or Saint			
1985	Hindi Nahahati ang Langit	Agnes Grivas		
1985	Inday Bote	Mrs. Salameda		
1985	Miguelito: Batang Rebelde			
1985	Kay Dali ng Kahapon, Kay Bagal ng Bukas			
1985	Mga Kwento Ni Lola Basyang			
1985	Lilac, Bulaklak sa Magdamag			
1986	Payaso			
1987	Alabok sa Ulap	Mona Abad		
1987	Once Upon a Time	Reyna Kamkam		
1987	Saan Nagtatago ang Pag-ibig?	Carmen		
1987	Bloody Mary: The Movie			
1988	Paano Tatakasan ang Bukas?	Rodora Garcia		
1988	Mirror, Mirror on the Wall	Esperanza / Panchang		
1988	Nagbabagang Luha	Mrs. Imelda Montaire		
1988	Kapag Napagod ang Puso			
1988	Sandakot na Bala	Elena		
1988	Lord, Bakit Ako Pa?			
1988	Nasaan Ka, Inay	Mrs. Isabel Villarama		
1989	Huwag Kang Hahalik sa Diablo			
1989	Bilangin ang Bituin sa Langit	Doña Martina Santos		
1989	Kung Maibabalik Ko Lang	Gemma		
1989	Impaktita	Roselia		
1989	Oras-oras, Araw-araw			
1989	Si Aida, si Lorna, o si Fe	Tita Chuchi		
1989	Lady L.	Doña Amanda		

=== 1990s ===
Gloria Romero's film credits
Year	Title	Role	Notes	Ref(s)
1990	Bakit Ikaw Pa Rin?	Cora		
1990	Tayo Na sa Dilim	Fe Vallejo		
1990	Kapag Langit ang Humatol	Doña Octavia		
1990	I Have 3 Eggs	Donya Concha		
1990	Kahit Isumpa Mo Ako			
1990	Atorni Agaton (Abogadong de Kampanilya)			
1990	My Other Woman			
1991	Kislap sa Dilim	Adela		
1991	Dinampot Ka Lang sa Putik			
1991	Katabi Ko'y Mamaw			
1991	Joey Boy Munti, 15 Anyos Ka sa Muntilupa			
1991	Ang Siga at ang Sosyal			
1991	Makiusap Ka sa Diyos	Doña Encarnacion Aguirre vda. de Leveriza		
1991	Disgrasyada			
1992	Alabang Girls	Doña Consuelo		
1992	Bakit Labis Kitang Mahal			
1993	Pulis Patola			
1993	Ayaw Ko Ng Mangarap	Azul		
1994	Kadenang Bulaklak	Mrs. Doctolero		
1994	Forever			
1994	Sana'y Laging Magkapiling			
1995	Ikaw Pa... Eh Love Kita!	Mrs. Samonte		
1995	Rollerboys	Lola Martha		
1995	Araw-araw, Gabi-gabi	Mrs. Carillo		
1995	Sana Dalawa ang Puso Ko	Rose		
1996	A. E. I. O. U.	Lola Julia		
1996	Ang Misis Kong Hoodlum	Olympia		
1996	Rubberman	Madam Rita		
1997	Takot Ako sa Darling Ko!	Doña Medusa		
1997	Laging Naroon Ka			
1997	Do Re Mi	Reggie's grandma		
1999	Dahil May Isang Ikaw	Lola Amor		
1999	Maldita	Letty		

=== 2000s ===
Gloria Romero's film credits
Year	Title	Role	Notes	Ref(s)
2000	Tanging Yaman	Dolores "Lola Loleng" Rosales	The film has reportedly grossed ₱167 million at the box-office.	
2000	Daddy O, Baby O!	Brenda		
2001	Bahay ni Lola	Lola	With ₱100 million total earnings, Bahay ni Lola was the highest-grossing entry at the 2001 Metro Manila Film Festival.	
2001	American Adobo	Gerry's mom		
2001	Bakit 'Di Totohanin	Lola Eping		
2001	Narinig Mo na Ba ang L8est?			
2002	Singsing ni Lola	Lola		
2002	I Think I'm In Love	Amor		
2002	Cass & Cary: Who Wants to Be a Billionaire?	Donya Gracia Imperial		
2003	Magnifico	Lola Magda		
2003	Spirit Warriors: The Shortcut	Red's grandmother		
2004	Beautiful Life	Magda		
2004	Annie B.	Lola Karay		
2005	Bahay ni Lola 2	Amelia Go		
2005	Let the Love Begin	Lola		
2005	Shake, Rattle & Roll 2k5	Lola	Episode: "Poso"	
2006	Moments of Love	Rosa Santos/Old Divina		
2006	Tulay			
2006	I Wanna Be Happy	Mameng Domingo		
2007	Bahay Kubo: A Pinoy Mano Po!	Lola Ida		
2007	M.O.N.A.Y (Misteyks Obda Neyson Address Yata) ni Mr. Shooli			
2008	Paupahan	Gloria		
2009	Nobody, Nobody But... Juan	Aida		
2009	Tarot	Lola Auring		
2009	Kamoteng Kahoy	Lola Idang		
2009	Fuchsia	Mameng		

=== 2010s ===
Gloria Romero's film credits
Year	Title	Role	Notes	Ref(s)
2010	Petrang Kabayo	Lola Idang		
2010	Tarima	Lola Imang		
2012	Just One Summer	Lola Meding Reyes		
2013	Alfredo S. Lim (The Untold Story)	Lola Flora		
2017	Carlo J. Caparas' Ang Panday	Rosa Batungbakal		
2018	Rainbow's Sunset	Sylvia Estrella		

== Television ==
Angel Aquino's television credits with year of release, title(s) and role
Year	Title	Role	Notes	Ref(s)
1986	Mansyon			
1987–1998	Palibhasa Lalake	Minerva Chavez		
1992	50 Carats, O Di Ba?			
1993	Maalaala Mo Kaya: Bola	Cita		
1995	Maalaala Mo Kaya: Alampay	Pacita		
1996–1997	Familia Zaragoza	Doña Amparo Zaragoza		
1997	Maalaala Mo Kaya: Agiw	Polly		
1999–2001	Labs Ko Si Babe	Aurora Mabuenas		
2001–2003	Sa Dulo ng Walang Hanggan	Carmela Estocapio		
2002–2006	OK Fine, 'To Ang Gusto Nyo!	Lola Barbie		
2003–2004	Sana'y Wala Nang Wakas	Doña Valeria Valencia		
2005–2006	Mga Anghel na Walang Langit	Doña Elena		
2006	Crazy for You			
2006	Star Magic Presents: Tender Loving Care	Lola Coring		
2006	Komiks Presents: Momay	Ana		
2006–2007	Da Adventures of Pedro Penduko	Lola Maria Penduko		
2007	Pedro Penduko at ang mga Engkantao	Lola Maria Penduko		
2007–2008	Lastikman	Amon Labao		
2008	Maalaala Mo Kaya (Singsing Episode)	Etrona		
2008	Palos	Alfonsina Riviera		
2008–2009	I Love Betty La Fea	Doray		
2009	Nasaan Ka Maruja?	Lola Rosing Rivera		
2009	May Bukas Pa	Aling Soledad		
2010	Kokey @ Ako	Barbara "Madam Barbra" Reyes		
2010	Kung Tayo'y Magkakalayo	Barbara De Jesus		
2010	Your Song Presents: My Last Romance	Rose Suarez		
2011	100 Days to Heaven	Lola Pilar Salviejo		
2011	Spooky Nights: Singil	Linda Rodriguez		
2011	Andres de Saya	Coring "Mama Coring" Golpe de Oro		
2011–2012	Munting Heredera	Doña Anastacia "Ana" Montereal-Lobregat		
2012–2013	Cielo de Angelina	Sor Margaret		
2012	Makapiling Kang Muli	Señora Soledad Vda. de Silvestre-Caballero		
2013	Akin Pa Rin ang Bukas	Doña Cristina Alperos		
2013	Sarap Diva	Herself		
2013	One Day Isang Araw	Grandma Gracia		
2013	Forever	Doña Adora Del Prado		
2014	Niño	Lola "V" Violeta		
2014–2016	The Half Sisters	Elizabeth McBride	324 episodes	
2015	Kalyeserye	Doña Paquita Beveliana Zobeyala / Tiya Bebeng		
2015	The Rich Man's Daughter	Cecilia "Ama" Tanchingco		
2016	Juan Happy Love Story	Imelda "Mameng" Valencia-Dela Costa		
2017	Meant to Be	Madonna 'Lola Madj' Sta. Maria		
2017–2020, 2022	Daig Kayo ng Lola Ko	Gloria "Lola Goreng" Espino		
2017–2018	Kambal, Karibal	Anicia Enriquez		
2017	Paskong Kapuso: The GMA Christmas Special	Herself		

== Selected radio appearances ==
Date	Program	Episode	Ref.
September 8, 1959	Ang Inyong Lingkod, Gloria Romero	"Ang Maniwala sa Sabi-sabi, Walang Bait sa Sarili"	
September 15, 1959	Ang Inyong Lingkod, Gloria Romero	"Kung Ano ang Itinanim ay siya ring Aanihin"	
September 22, 1959	Ang Inyong Lingkod, Gloria Romero	Kung Ano ang Taas ng Pagkadakila, ay siya rin namang Lagapak kung Madapa"	
September 29, 1959	Ang Inyong Lingkod, Gloria Romero	"Tuso Man ang Matsing, Napaglalalangan Din"	
October 6, 1959	Ang Inyong Lingkod, Gloria Romero	"Pag May Isinuksok, May Madudukot"	
October 27, 1959	Ang Inyong Lingkod, Gloria Romero	"May Taynga ang Lupa, May Pakpak ang Balita"	
December 1, 1959	Ang Inyong Lingkod, Gloria Romero	"Iyang Taong Manloloko, Takot sa Sarili lng Multo"	
January 5, 1960	Ang Inyong Lingkod, Gloria Romero	"Ang Pili ng Pili, Natatapat sa Bungi"	
January 26, 1960	Ang Inyong Lingkod, Gloria Romero		

== Stage ==
Year	Production	Role	Venue	Ref(s)
1954	Martir sa Golgota	The Blessed Virgin Mary	Manila Grand Opera House	
1955	Martir sa Golgota	The Blessed Virgin Mary	Manila Grand Opera House	
1956	Martir sa Golgota	The Blessed Virgin Mary	Manila Grand Opera House	

== Music video appearances ==
Year	Title	Performer(s)	Album	Ref(s)
2012	"Bakit Miss Kita"	Ray "Dr. G" Gapuz	Whispers From The Heart	

== See also ==
- List of highest-grossing Philippine films
- List of awards and honors received by Gloria Romero
- List of movies produced by Sampaguita Pictures
- List of films produced and released by Viva Films
- List of Regal Entertainment films
- List of films produced and released by Star Cinema
