= List of awards and honours received by Gloria Romero =

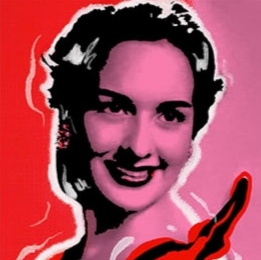
Romero, as depicted in a PhilPost commemorative post stamp.

Gloria Romero (1933–2025) was a Filipino actress who has received various accolades for her work in film and television throughout her career that spanned seven decades. The National Commission for Culture and the Arts (NCCA) in 2005, the Movie and Television Review and Classification Board (MTRCB) in 2009 and the Film Development Council of the Philippines (FDCP) in 2024, awarded her the Lifetime Achievement Award, as well as Luna Awards in 2002, FAMAS, Gawad Urian (both in 2004), and Star Awards for Television in 2012. Romero was posthumously conferred the Presidential Medal of Merit in 2025.

Romero rose to prominence as a romantic lead during the first golden age of Philippine cinema and became the biggest box-office draw of the period. For her portrayal of the title character the romantic comedy Dalagang Ilocana (1954), she earned her first FAMAS Award for Best Actress. She next appeared in FAMAS-nominated performances in Alaalang Banal (1958), Ikaw ang Aking Buhay (1959), and Iginuhit ng Tadhana (1965). She took on conventional roles in 1970s but only began receiving critical success again in mid-1980s. For her role in Eddie Garcia's romantic drama Saan Nagtatago Ang Pag-ibig? (1986), she earned a Luna Award for Best Supporting Actress. She next appeared in Ishmael Bernal's Nagbabagang Luha (1987), for which she won a FAMAS Award for Best Supporting Actress. During this period, she began appearing in television productions and won a Star Award for Best Comedy Actress for her performance in the sitcom Palibhasa Lalake (1987).

Romero received newfound attention and success in the 2000s. For her portrayal of an Alzheimer's disease-stricken matriarch in the family drama Tanging Yaman (2000), she won almost all major Philippine award-giving bodies. She received a Gawad Urian for Best Supporting Actress for her performance as an aged woman in the coming-of-age Magnifico (2003). She then starred in the comedy drama Fuchsia (2008), where she earned a Golden Screen Award for Best Actress and was awarded a Star Award for Movie Supporting Actress of the Year for her role in the gay-themed drama Tarima (2010). For her final film role where she portrayed a devoted wife in Rainbow's Sunset (2018), she received a Metro Manila Film Festival Award for Best Actress.

== State honors ==
Awards and nominations received by Gloria Romero
| Award (Note: Awards, festivals, honors and other miscellaneous organizations are listed in alphabetical order.) | Year (Note: Indicates the year of ceremony.) | Category | Result | Ref. |
|---|---|---|---|---|
| Film Development Council of the Philippines | 2021 | Ilaw ng Industriya Award | Honored | |
| Film Development Council of the Philippines | 2024 | Lifetime Achievement Award | Honored | |
| National Commission for Culture and the Arts | 2005 (Note: Co-presented by the Office of the Presidential Advisor on Culture (OPAC)) | Pama-As Gintong Bai Award (Note: Also known as "Lifetime Achievement Award: A Salute to Women in the Arts and Heritage Preservation") | Honored | |
| National Commission for Culture and the Arts | 2010 (Note: Co-presented by the La Consolacion College Manila) | Gawad Parangal sa Ginintuang Bituin | Honored | |
| Republic of the Philippines | 2025 | Presidential Medal of Merit | Honored | |

== Major associations ==
Awards and nominations received by Gloria Romero
| Award | Year | Category | Nominated work | Result | Ref. |
|---|---|---|---|---|---|
| Box Office Entertainment Awards | 2001 | All-Time Favorite Actress | Gloria Romero | Won | |
| Box Office Entertainment Awards | 2003 | All-Time Favorite Actress | Gloria Romero | Won | |
| Box Office Entertainment Awards | 2019 | Golden Jury Award for All Time Favorite Actress | Gloria Romero | Won | |
| Box Office Entertainment Awards | 2025 | Posthumous Award as Entertainment Icons | Gloria Romero | Won | |
| Catholic Mass Media Awards | 1988 | Best Supporting Actress | Saan Nagtatago ang Pag-ibig? | Nominated | |
| Catholic Mass Media Awards | 2020 | Best Children and Youth Program | Daig Kayo ng Lola Ko | Won | |
| Cinemanila International Film Festival | 2001 | Lifetime Achievement Award | Gloria Romero | Won | |
| Eastwood City Walk of Fame | 2005 | Inductee | Gloria Romero | Won | |
| FAMAS Awards | 1955 | Best Actress | Dalagang Ilocana | Won | |
| FAMAS Awards | 1959 | Best Actress | Alaalang Banal | Nominated | |
| FAMAS Awards | 1960 | Best Actress | Ikaw Ang Aking Buhay | Nominated | |
| FAMAS Awards | 1966 | Best Actress | Iginuhit ng Tadhana: The Ferdinand E. Marcos Story | Nominated | |
| FAMAS Awards | 1985 | Best Supporting Actress | Condemned | Nominated | |
| FAMAS Awards | 1988 | Best Supporting Actress | Saan Nagtatago ang Pag-ibig? | Nominated | |
| FAMAS Awards | 1989 | Best Supporting Actress | Nagbabagang Luha | Won | |
| FAMAS Awards | 1990 | Best Supporting Actress | Bilangin ang Bituin sa Langit | Nominated | |
| FAMAS Awards | 2001 | Best Actress | Tanging Yaman | Won | |
| FAMAS Awards | 2004 | Lifetime Achievement Award | Gloria Romero | Won | |
| FAMAS Awards | 2009 | Huwarang Bituin | Gloria Romero | Won | |
| FAMAS Awards | 2015 | Iconic Movie Queens of Philippine Cinema | Gloria Romero | Won | |
| FAMAS Awards | 2024 | Special Citation Award | Gloria Romero | Won | |
| Film Ambassadors’ Night | 2020 | Honoree: Actors Category | Rainbow’s Sunset (Note: For winning Best Actress at the International Film Festival Manhattan, 2019) | Won | |
| Film Ambassadors’ Night | 2020 | Honoree: Actors Category | Rainbow’s Sunset (Note: For winning Best Ensemble Acting at the International Film Festival Manhattan, 2019) | Won | |
| Gawad Pasado | 2019 | Pinakapasadong Aktres | Rainbow's Sunset | Won | |
| Gawad Urian | 2001 | Best Actress | Tanging Yaman | Won | |
| Gawad Urian | 2004 | Best Supporting Actress | Magnifico | Won | |
| Gawad Urian | 2004 | Lifetime Achievement Award | Gloria Romero | Won | |
| Gawad Tanglaw | 2011 | Best Supporting Actress (tied with Rustica Carpio) | Tarima | Won | |
| Golden Screen Awards | 2005 | Outstanding Supporting Actress in a Comedy Series | OK Fine, 'Tong Gusto Ko | Nominated | |
| Golden Screen Awards | 2007 | Best Actress in a Comedy/Musical | I Wanna Be Happy | Nominated | |
| Golden Screen Awards | 2009 | Best Actress in a Comedy/Musical | Fuchsia | Won | |
| Golden Screen Awards | 2011 | Outstanding Supporting Actress in a Gag or Comedy Show | Andres de Saya | Nominated | |
| Golden Screen Awards | 2011 | Outstanding Supporting Actress in a Drama Series | Munting Heredera | Nominated | |
| Golden Screen Awards | 2011 | Best Performance by an Actress in a Supporting Role | Tarima | Nominated | |
| Golden Screen Awards | 2011 | Plaque of Recognition (Movie Icons of Our Time) | Gloria Romero | Won | |
| Golden Screen Awards | 2013 | Helen Vela Lifetime Achievement Award for Drama | Gloria Romero | Won | |
| International Film Festival Manhattan | 2019 | Best Ensemble Acting | Rainbow's Sunset | Won | |
| International Film Festival Manhattan | 2019 | Best Actress | Rainbow's Sunset | Won | |
| Luna Awards | 1987 | Best Supporting Actress | Saan Nagtatago Ang Pag-ibig? | Won | |
| Luna Awards | 1988 | Best Supporting Actress | Nagbabagang Luha | Nominated | |
| Luna Awards | 2001 | Best Actress | Tanging Yaman | Won | |
| Luna Awards | 2002 | Lifetime Achievement Awards | Gloria Romero | Won | |
| Luna Awards | 2004 | Best Supporting Actress | Magnifico | Won | |
| Luna Awards | 2005 | Best Supporting Actress | Beautiful Life | Nominated | |
| Luna Awards | 2011 | Best Supporting Actress | Tarima | Nominated | |
| Metro Manila Film Festival | 1997 | Plaque of Recognition (Cinema's Living Treasures) | Gloria Romero | Won | |
| Metro Manila Film Festival | 2000 | Best Actress | Tanging Yaman | Won | |
| Metro Manila Film Festival | 2002 | Best Supporting Actress | I Think I'm in Love | Won | |
| Metro Manila Film Festival | 2018 | Best Actress | Rainbows Sunset | Won | |
| Metro Manila Film Festival | 2020 | Manay Ichu Vera-Perez Maceda Memorial Award | Gloria Romero | Won | |
| MTRCB TV Awards | 2009 | Lifetime Achievement Award | Gloria Romero | Won | |
| PMPC Star Awards for Movies | 1988 | Best Supporting Actress | Saan Nagtatago ang Pag-ibig? | Won | |
| PMPC Star Awards for Movies | 1995 | Ulirang Artista Award | Gloria Romero | Won | |
| PMPC Star Awards for Movies | 2001 | Best Actress | Tanging Yaman | Nominated | |
| PMPC Star Awards for Movies | 2009 | Movie Actress of the Year | Fuchsia | Nominated | |
| PMPC Star Awards for Movies | 2009 | Movie Supporting Actress of the Year | Paupahan | Nominated | |
| PMPC Star Awards for Movies | 2011 | Movie Supporting Actress of the Year | Tarima | Won | |
| PMPC Star Awards for Movies | 2019 | Movie Actress of the Year | Rainbow's Sunset | Nominated | |
| PMPC Star Awards for Movies | 2019 | Outstanding Star of the Century | Gloria Romero | Won | |
| PMPC Star Awards for Television | 1988 | Best Comedy Actress | Palibhasa Lalake | Won | |
| PMPC Star Awards for Television | 1991 | Best Comedy Actress | Palibhasa Lalake | Nominated | |
| PMPC Star Awards for Television | 2004 | Best Drama Actress | Sana'y Wala Nang Wakas | Nominated | |
| PMPC Star Awards for Television | 2006 | Best Comedy Actress | OK Fine, 'To Ang Gusto Nyo! | Nominated | |
| PMPC Star Awards for Television | 2008 | Best Single Performance by an Actress | Maalaala Mo Kaya ("Singsing") | Nominated | |
| PMPC Star Awards for Television | 2012 | Ading Fernando Lifetime Achievement Award | Gloria Romero | Won | |
| PMPC Star Awards for Television | 2025 | Icon of Philippine Television Award | Gloria Romero | Won | |
| The EDDYS | 2019 | Best Actress | Rainbow's Sunset | Nominated | |
| Young Critics Circle | 1999 | Best Performance | Dahil May Isang Ikaw | Won | |
| Young Critics Circle | 2000 | Best Performance | Tanging Yaman | Won | |

== Minor associations ==
Awards and nominations received by Gloria Romero
| Award | Year | Category | Nominated work | Result | Ref. |
|---|---|---|---|---|---|
| ALTA Media Icon Awards | 2015 | Iconic Media Personality for Film and Television | Gloria Romero | Won | |
| Anak TV Awards | 2017 | Female Makabata Star | Gloria Romero | Won | |
| Anak TV Awards | 2018 | Female Makabata Star | Gloria Romero | Won | |
| Creative Guild Ad of the Year Awards | 1988 | Best Actress in a TV Commercial | Superwheel | Won | |
| Directors' Guild of the Philippines | 2005 | Gawad Direk Awards | Gloria Romero | Won | |
| Gawad Sineng Sine Awards | 2001 | Best Actress (tied with Vilma Santos) | Tanging Yaman | Won | |
| GEMS: Hiyas ng Sining Awards | 2019 | Best Actress | Rainbow's Sunset | Nominated | |
| Inding Indie Film Festival | 2017 | Bayani ng Pinilakang Tabing | Gloria Romero | Won | |
| MTB (ABS-CBN's Decade and a Half of Leadership) | 2002 | 15-year Leadership Award | Gloria Romero | Won | |
| Patnubay ng Sining at Kalinangan Awards | 2003 | Special Award (Film Category) | Gloria Romero | Won | |
