= Saan Nagtatago ang Pag-ibig? =

1987 romantic drama film by Eddie Garcia

- Theatrical poster
- Directed by: Eddie Garcia
- Screenplay by: Armando Lao
- Story by: Gilda Olvidado
- Based on: Saan Nagtatago ang Pag-ibig? by Gilda Olvidado
- Produced by: Ramon Salvador
- Starring: Vilma Santos; Tonton Gutierrez; Ricky Davao; Gloria Romero; Alicia Alonzo; Cherie Gil; Alicia Vergel
- Cinematography: Romeo Vitug
- Edited by: Ike Jarlego Jr.
- Music by: George Canseco
- Production company: Viva Films
- Distributed by: Viva Films
- Release date: September 2, 1987
- Running time: 124 minutes
- Country: Philippines
- Language: Filipino

Saan Nagtatago ang Pag-ibig? (lit. 'Where Does Love Hide?') is a 1987 Philippine romantic drama film directed by Eddie Garcia from a screenplay written by Armando Lao, which was adapted from a comic serial of the same name written by Gilda Olvidado (serialized via Pogi Komiks). Starring Vilma Santos, Tonton Gutierrez, and Ricky Davao, the story follows a woman who was forced into marriage with a man who has an intellectual disability to conceal a pregnancy involving his brother.

Produced and distributed by Viva Films, it was theatrically released on September 2, 1987.

== Plot ==
Estella becomes pregnant with her boyfriend Ric, an irresponsible law student who financially relies on his wealthy, authoritarian grandmother, Doña Pacing. Ric refuses to marry Estella for fear of being disinherited. To protect the family’s reputation while ensuring the child is born into their household, Ric and his mother, Carmen, convinced Estella to marry Ric's half-brother, Val, who has an intellectual disability. Hesitant at first, Estella accepts the arrangement to provide a name and a future for her child and moves into the family's estate.

Living within the hostile environment of the mansion, Estella initially struggles to adjust to the situation but eventually finds comfort in Val's good-natured personality. She takes on the responsibility of being his primary caregiver and educator, teaching him basic life skills and helping him gain a level of independence he never had. With the passing of time, Estella's attitude toward the family softens into a genuine, protective affection for Val, discovering a selfless form of love in his innocence. However, their bond is met with continuous judgment from Doña Pacing and growing jealousy from Ric, who begins to regret his decision and attempts to boss Estella.

The tension reaches a breaking point when Ric becomes increasingly violent due to alcohol and a grudge over Estella and Val's relationship. During a final confrontation, Ric attacks Val on the house's veranda, and with the ensuing struggle, Val falls from the balcony to his death. Estella later confronts the family, criticizing their hypocrisy and the selfishness that dictates their lives. She realizes that while Ric and his grandmother were obsessed with social status and wealth, it was Val who offered the only genuine love to her.

== Cast ==
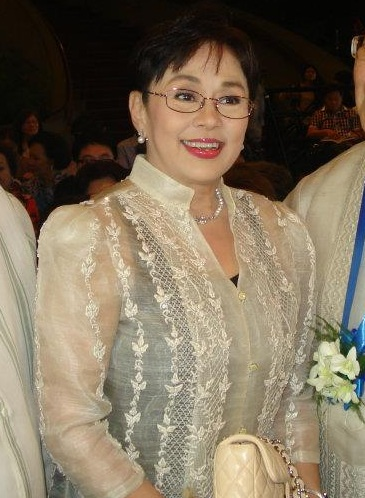
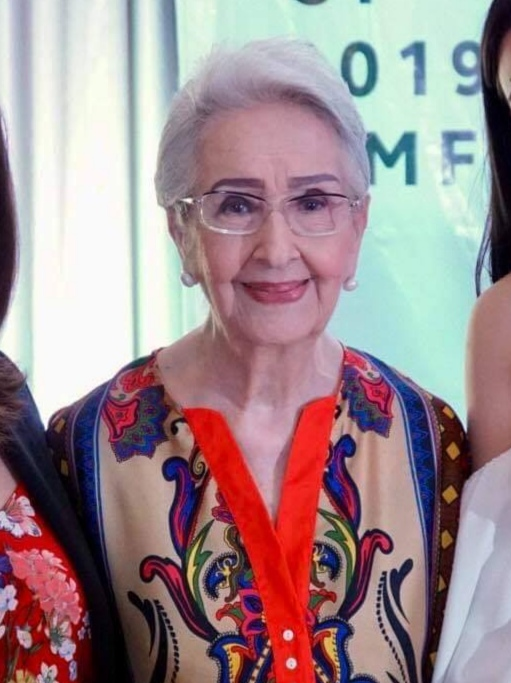
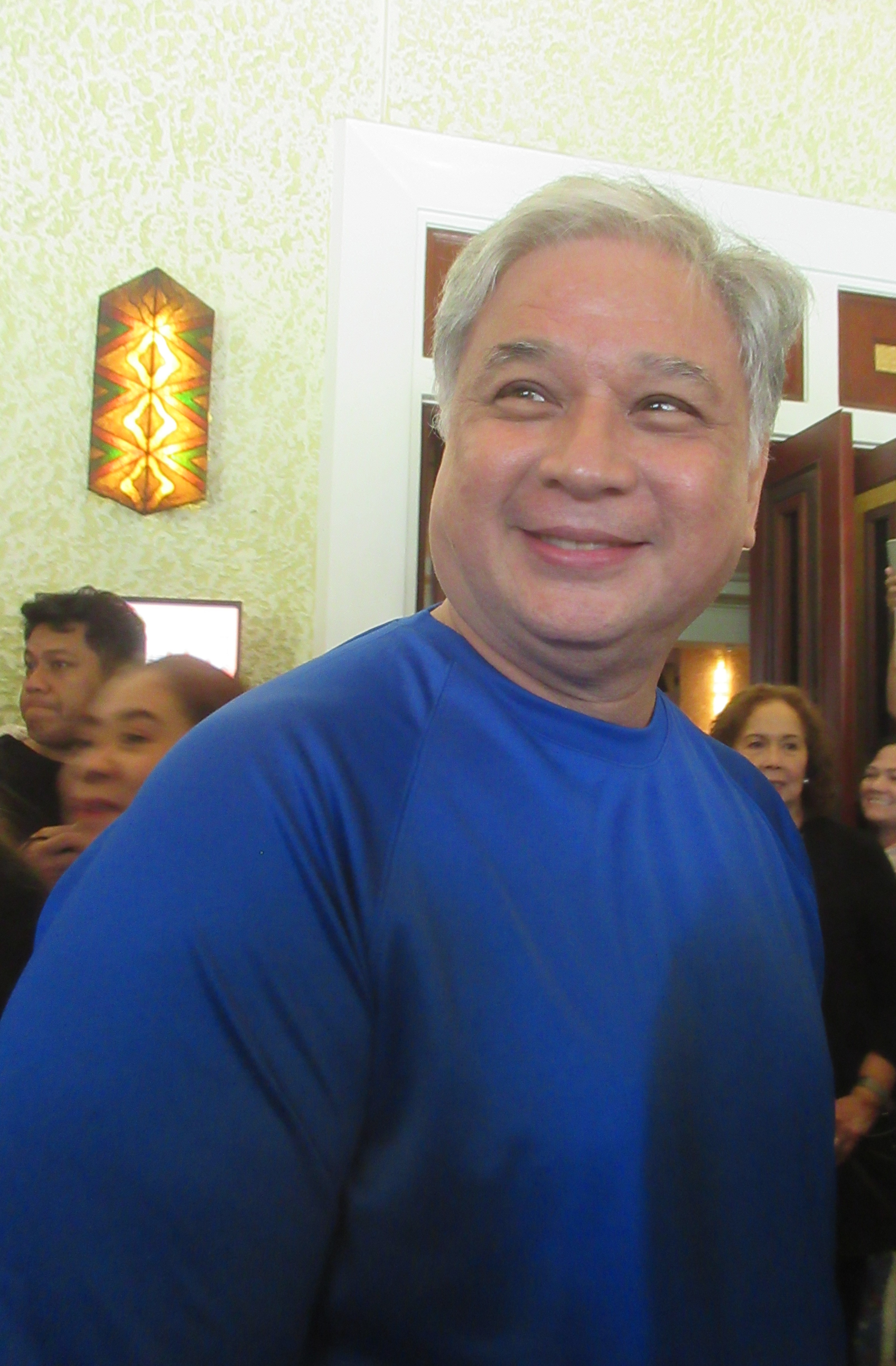
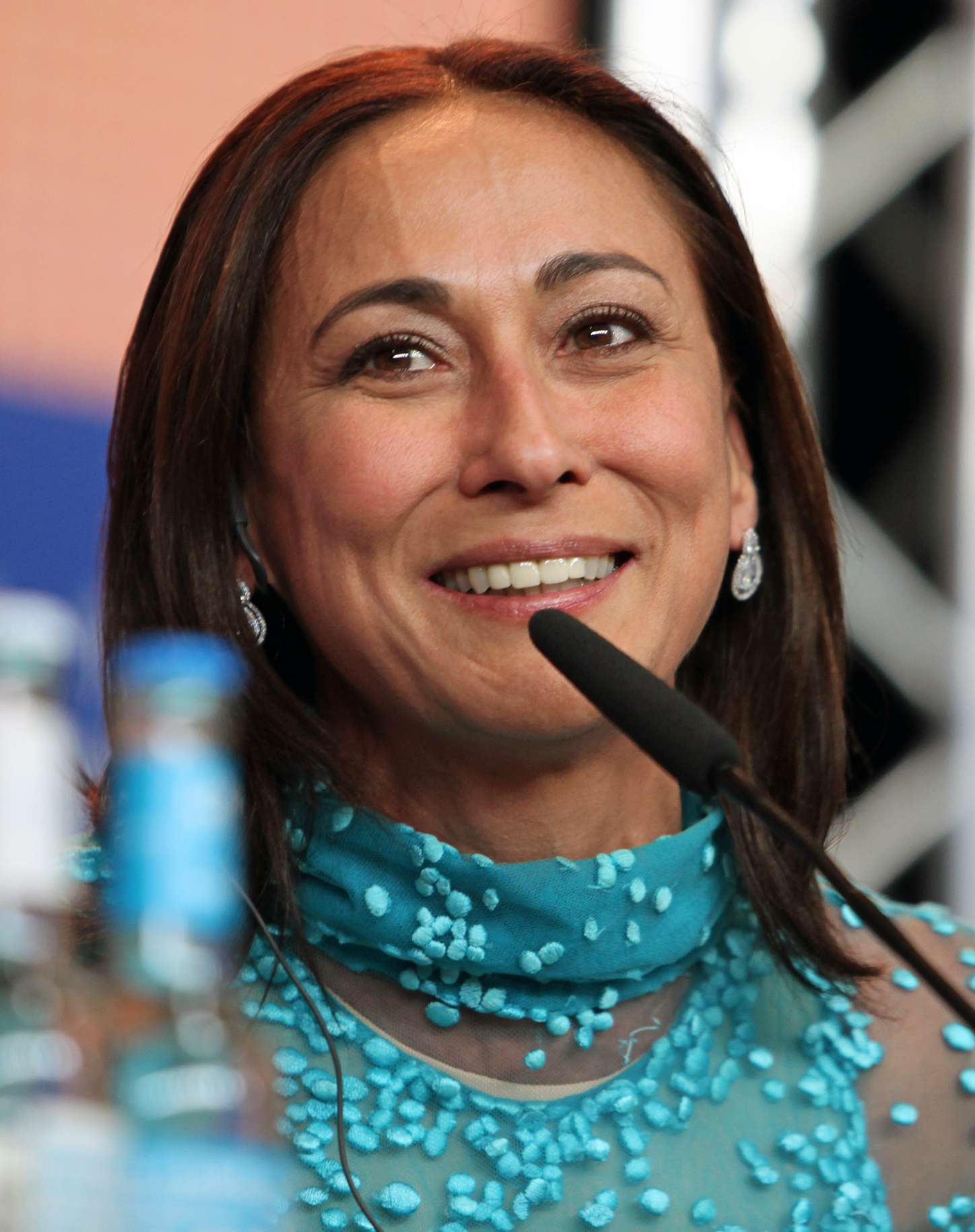
From left to right: Vilma Santos, Gloria Romero, Ricky Davao, and Cherie Gil
- Vilma Santos as Estella
- Tonton Gutierrez as Val
- Ricky Davao as Ric
- Gloria Romero as Carmen
- Alicia Alonzo as Carla
- Cherie Gil as Zeny
- Alicia Vergel as Doña Pacing
- Vangie Labalan as Gima
- Suzanne Gonzales as Malou
- Perla Bautista as Mrs. Abella
- Joonee Gamboa as Mr. Abella
- Joey Hipolito
- Rose Rosado
- Eddie Arenas
- John Symon Soler as young Val
- Robert Ortega
- Cris Daluz
- Vicky Suba as Malou
- Becky Misa
- Cris Vertido
- Gammy Viray
- Alma Lerma
- Amiel Leonardia
- Richard Reynoso

== Production ==
Saan Nagtatago ang Pag-ibig? was first serialized in komiks by Gilda Olvidado before it was adapted for film. Christopher de Leon was initially tapped to portray Val, a man who has an intellectual disability, but the role eventually went to Tonton Gutierrez after he turned it down.

== Release ==
On September 1, 1987, the Bicol Festival Foundation sponsored the premiere of the film at the Rizal Theater. The film was released by Viva Films the following day, September 2, 1987. Philippine Daily Inquirer contributor Nestor Torre wrote that out of the 95 feature films released in 1987, only fourteen were drama-themed films, approximately 14.74% of the total film production in the Philippines that year. On February 14 & 18, 1993, the film was screened for free in Rizal Park as part of the National Arts Month celebration.

=== Home media ===
Saan Nagtatago ang Pag-ibig? was released on VHS and DVD by Viva Video. The film was made available for digital streaming and purchase on platforms such as YouTube and Amazon Prime Video.

== Reception ==
=== Critical response ===
Writing for Manila Standard, Mike Feria remarked that the film "transcended the limitations of the genre" and praised the cast's performance, calling it "the best acting cast ever assembled this year." Also writing for Manila Standard, Luciano Soriano criticized the "serious credibility problem" of the film's narrative but commended the "well-acted" performances of the casts. In a year-end review, Mike Feria described 1987 a "tragic year for local movies", stating that "no film can be cited for excellence" but exempted Saan Nagtatago ang Pag-ibig? for its "competent direction, excellent acting, and cinematography".

=== Accolades ===
Accolades received by Saan Nagtatago ang Pag-ibig?
Award	Date of ceremony	Category	Recipient(s)	Result	Ref.
Catholic Mass Media Awards	February 27, 1988	Best Screenplay	Armando Lao	Nominated	
Catholic Mass Media Awards	February 27, 1988	Best Actor	Tonton Gutierrez	Won	
Catholic Mass Media Awards	February 27, 1988	Best Supporting Actor	Ricky Davao	Nominated	
Catholic Mass Media Awards	February 27, 1988	Best Supporting Actress	Gloria Romero	Nominated	
Star Awards for Movies	April 20, 1988	Best Picture	Saan Nagtatago ang Pag-ibig?	Won	
Star Awards for Movies	April 20, 1988	Best Director	Eddie Garcia	Won	
Star Awards for Movies	April 20, 1988	Best Actor	Tonton Gutierrez	Won	
Star Awards for Movies	April 20, 1988	Best Supporting Actress	Gloria Romero	Won	
Star Awards for Movies	April 20, 1988	Best Screenplay (Adaptation)	Armando Lao	Won	
Star Awards for Movies	April 20, 1988	Best Cinematography	Romy Vitug	Won	
Star Awards for Movies	April 20, 1988	Best Editor	Ike Jarlejo Jr.	Won	
FAMAS Awards	May 6, 1988	Best Picture	Saan Nagtatago ang Pag-ibig?	Won	
FAMAS Awards	May 6, 1988	Best Director	Eddie Garcia	Won	
FAMAS Awards	May 6, 1988	Best Actor	Tonton Gutierrez	Nominated	
FAMAS Awards	May 6, 1988	Best Supporting Actress	Gloria Romero	Nominated	
FAMAS Awards	May 6, 1988	Best Story	Gilda Olvidado	Won	
FAMAS Awards	May 6, 1988	Best Sound	Rolly Ruta	Won	
FAMAS Awards	May 6, 1988	Best Cinematography	Romy Vitug	Won	
Luna Awards	May 28, 1988	Best Picture	Saan Nagtatago ang Pag-ibig?	Won	
Luna Awards	May 28, 1988	Best Director	Eddie Garcia	Won	
Luna Awards	May 28, 1988	Best Supporting Actress	Gloria Romero (Note: tied with Nida Blanca)	Won	
Luna Awards	May 28, 1988	Best Cinematography	Romy Vitug	Won	
