= Gloria Romero =

Filipino actress and model (1933–2025)

- Romero in 1954
- Born: Gloria Anne Borrego Galla; December 16, 1933; Denver, Colorado, U.S.
- Died: January 25, 2025 (aged 91); Quezon City, Philippines
- Resting place: Basilica of the National Shrine of Our Lady of Mount Carmel Crypt, Quezon City
- Occupations: Actress; model
- Years active: 1949–2025
- Works: Full list
- Spouse: Juancho Gutiérrez (m. 1960; died 2005)
- Children: Maritess Gutierrez
- Relatives: Chris Gutierrez (grandson)
- Awards: Full list
- Honors: Presidential Medal of Merit Award

Gloria Romero (Tagalog: [ˈɡloɾja ɾɔˈmɛɾɔ]; born Gloria Anne Borrego Galla; December 16, 1933 – January 25, 2025) was an American-born Filipino actress. Regarded as the "Queen of Philippine Cinema", she appeared in more than 300 film and television productions throughout her career that spanned seven decades. She was the Philippines' highest-paid and biggest box-office movie star during the Golden Age of Philippine Cinema.

Romero began her film career at the age of sixteen in 1950, initially working as an extra before landing her first major role in Sampaguita Pictures' Madame X (1952). She won her first FAMAS Award for Best Actress for her portrayal of a spirited tobacco-smoking maiden in Dalagang Ilocana (1954). Since then, she rose to popularity with leading roles in romantic comedies, remakes of pre-war musical films, and adaptations of comics serials. Outside of film, her stage work was limited to portraying the Blessed Virgin Mary in the Lenten play Martir sa Golgota, a role she performed annually from 1954 to 1956.

By the late 1950s, Romero had become a major box-office draw across Asia and soon ventured into fashion modeling. She worked closely with Ramon Valera as one of his muses and was one of the original Karilagan models that represented Philippine couture in domestic and international high-profile runway events. She was noted for shifting the social standing of actors by bridging the gap between the film industry and high society. Romero eventually parted ways with Sampaguita Pictures and explored complex roles, playing more mature, darker, and morally ambiguous characters. While she continued appearing in films, she ventured into television in the late 1980s, a period where she also experienced critical resurgence, winning major competitive acting accolades for the first time in over thirty years for her roles in Saan Nagtatago ang Pag-ibig? (1987) and Nagbabagang Luha (1988).

Romero gained newfound success in the latter part of her career with Tanging Yaman (2000) and Bahay ni Lola (2001), the highest-grossing films of the 2000 and 2001 Metro Manila Film Festivals. She received her second competitive Gawad Urian for her role in Magnifico (2003) and won the International Film Festival Manhattan Award for Best Actress for her final film, Rainbow's Sunset (2018). Romero received numerous honorary accolades, including the Pama-As Gintong Bai Award from the National Commission for Culture and the Arts in 2005, Lifetime Achievement Awards from the Movie and Television Review and Classification Board in 2009 and the Film Development Council of the Philippines in 2024. She was honored with a commemorative stamp in 2022 issued by the Philippine Postal Corporation and was posthumously conferred the Presidential Medal of Merit in 2025.

== Life and career ==
=== 1933–1948: Early life and background ===
Gloria Romero was born as Gloria Anne Borrego Galla on December 16, 1933, in Denver, Colorado, to Pedro Galla and Mary Borrego. Her father was a Filipino who went to the United States to pursue his education. There he met Mary, an American of Spanish descent. In 1937, they went to the Philippines to visit Pedro's parents in Mabini, Pangasinan. The family's plan of returning to Denver was always postponed, and the supposed vacation was extended.

When World War II broke out, the Gallas were trapped in the Philippines. During the war, they learned how to farm. In 1943, Japanese soldiers arrested and interrogated Romero's mother. Days before the war ended, her mother died after falling down the stairs inside their residence. Gloria's father decided that the family would stay in the Philippines for good. Romero's three siblings became successful as they reached adulthood; the eldest sibling Louise became a nurse, her brother Tito Galla (1935–1979) became a popular actor, and the youngest, Gilbert, was a US-based doctor.

Romero attended Mabini Elementary School and Riverview High School, also in Mabini. She did not finish her studies in high school.

=== 1949–1954: Early career and breakthrough ===
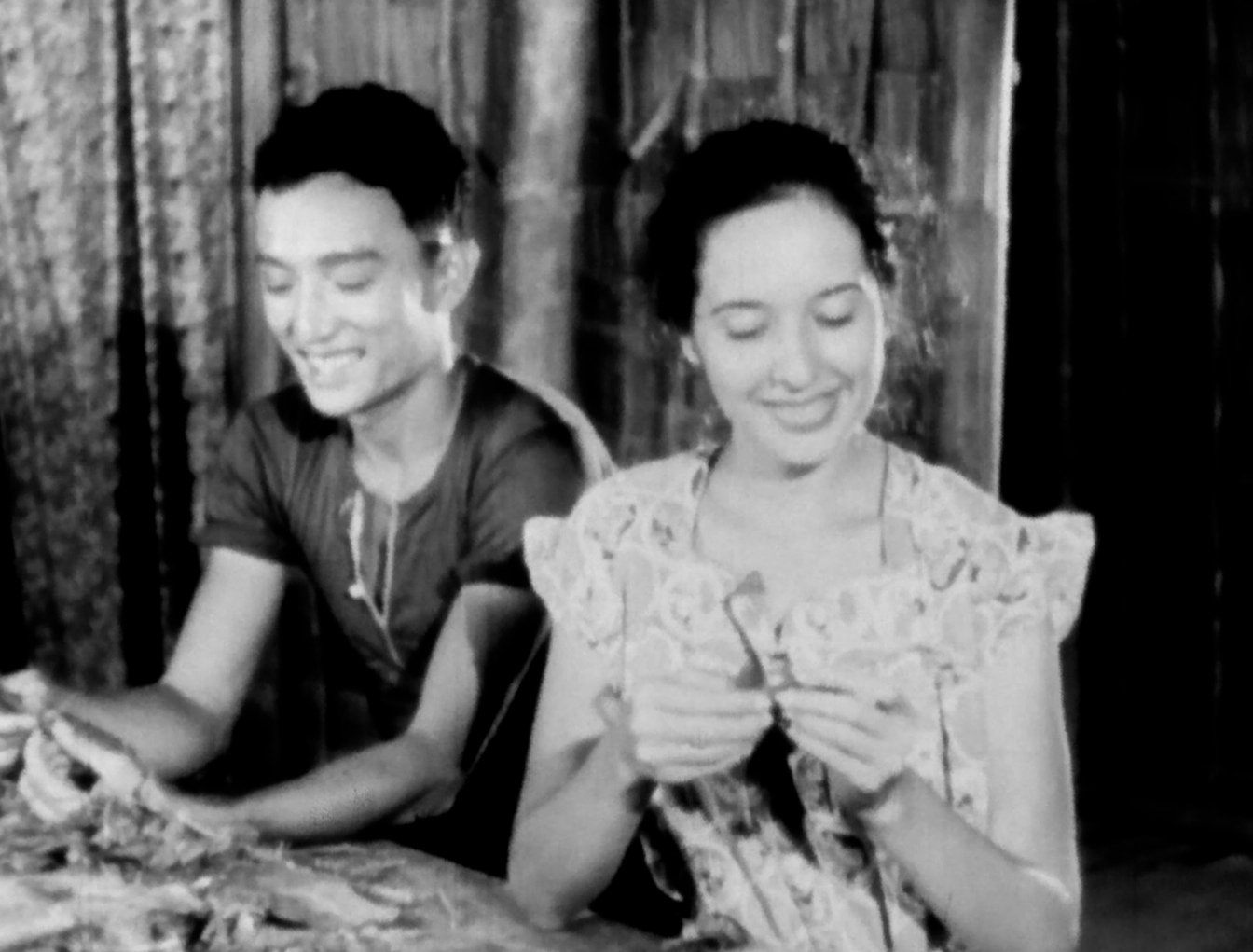
Romero with Dolphy in the 1954 film Dalagang Ilocana

At age 11, Romero started aspiring to become an actress. After she left school, her family moved to Manila and with her father's consent, tried her luck in show business. She first appeared as an extra in the 1949 film Ang Bahay sa Lumang Gulod, as well as in two other films under Premiere Productions, Prinsipe Don Juan (1951) and Bahay na Tisa (1951). She was eventually dismissed from the film production company and transferred to Sampaguita Pictures with the help of her distant uncle, Nario Rosales, who was the studio's chief editor. She appeared in more films as an extra in Kasintahan sa Pangarap (1951), Bernardo Carpio (1951), Barbaro (1952), Dugong Bughaw (1951) and Prinsesa at Pulubi (1950).

After playing several other minor roles Romero finally bagged her first supporting role in Madame X (1952) and as lead actress in the film Palasig opposite Cesar Ramirez. After her breakthrough role in Monghita (1952) opposite Oscar Moreno she started to gain a massive following. In 1953, she starred in another blockbuster film Cofradia opposite Ramon Revilla. Her films also launched the careers for actors such as Lolita Rodriguez, Ric Rodrigo and Luis Gonzales for the films Pilya (1954) and Despachadora (1955).

She received her first acting award in 1954 at the FAMAS Awards as Best Actress for the film Dalagang Ilocana. It was the first time an actress from a comedy film won the award and also starred in another blockbuster film Kurdapya later that year.

=== 1955–1965: Stardom ===
By 1957, Romero has already starred in over twenty four films that became blockbusters in the Philippines and in several parts of Asia. According to Graphic Kislap Magazine, her films occupied the top three positions of the highest-grossing films of 1957. Sino Ang May Sala placed at No. 1 with earnings of ₱83,154 (equivalent to ₱10,640,328 in 2021), Hongkong Holiday placed at No. 2 with ₱82,793 (equivalent to ₱10,594,135 in 2021) while Paru-Parong Bukid secured the third spot with total earnings of ₱78,070 (equivalent to ₱9,989,783 in 2021) at the box-office. In September 1960, Romero and Juancho Gutierrez were married at the Santuario de San Antonio in Forbes Park, Makati, Rizal. Dubbed the "Wedding of the Year", the event was covered all over radio and leading newspapers and magazines in the country.

Romero also became a bankable commercial model and was one of the pioneering endorsers of Coca-Cola in the Philippines. She was the second personality (after Douglas MacArthur) after the war to endorse the soft drink brand. Among the other consumer products she endorsed were Talon Zipper, DariCreme, Sanka, Swans Down cake flour, Calumet baking powder, Camay and Gloco beauty soaps, Johnsons Medicated Talcum powder, Del Monte banana catsup, Silver Swan soy sauce and Lola Remedios.

In 1965, Romero appeared in five productions. She portrayed the former First Lady of the Philippines Imelda Marcos in the biographical film Iginuhit ng Tadhana. The film was a success at the box-office and received a special recognition from the Asian Film Festival. Romero revealed in an interview that they were only allowed to shoot at the Malacañang Palace "after office hours at 6 p.m. and wind up at 6 a.m. the next day". For her performance, she received a nomination for Best Actress at the 14th FAMAS Awards.

=== 1965-1979: Continued film appearances ===
In 1965, Romero was cast as the former first lady Imelda Marcos in the biographical film Iginuhit ng Tadhana. The film was a success at the box office and received a special accolade at the Asian Film Festival. She revealed in an interview that they were only allowed to shoot at the Malacañang Palace "after office hours at 6 p.m. and wind up at 6 a.m. the next day." For her role, she was nominated Best Actress at the 14th FAMAS Awards. The same year, she starred in the musical comedy Hamon sa Kampeon with Luis Gonzales, Susan Roces and Eddie Gutierrez, adapted from the talent radio program of the same name broadcast in DZAQ radio and Channel 3. Romero dabbled more into dramatic roles in the latter part of the 1960s. She was reunited with Luis Gonzales in the romantic drama Kamatayan Ko ang Ibigin Ka, an entry to the Manila Film Festival. She was then cast as the love interest of Joseph Estrada in the action drama Patria Adorada: Dugo ng Bayani. In 1969, Romero reprised her role as Imelda Marcos in the sequel Pinagbuklod ng Langit. The film won eight FAMAS Awards, including Best Picture.

While Romero continued playing lead in various films, she began playing supporting roles throughout the 1970s. She was cast in main roles in Haydee (1970) and Robina (1971), each starring Hilda Koronel and Gina Alajar in titular roles respectively. She then played as the love interest of Ramon Revilla Sr. in the action drama Nardong Putik. Romero next appeared in a number of high profile fantasy action productions. She was reunited with Revilla Sr. in the action drama Pepeng Agimat and played as an evil witch in Darna, Lipad, Darna! which stars Vilma Santos in the titular role. The latter film broke box office records domestically, grossing ₱8 million ($1.1 million) or ₱467 million in 2022 Philippine peso. Romero then starred with an ensemble cast in the social-realist Sakada. However, the film was pulled out from the theaters and copies were seized by the military under the Marcos dictatorship.

=== 1980–1998: Matriarch roles and television debut ===
Romero considered her 1984 film Condemned with Nora Aunor a turning point in her career. Her portrayal earned her a Best Supporting Actress nomination at the FAMAS Awards. In 1987, she played an unfaithful wife in the film Saan Nagtatago ang Pag-ibig?. for which she won a Star Award for Best Supporting Actress. The following year, she was cast in Ishmael Bernal's Nagbabagang Luha. Her performance was met with praise from the critics, winning her a second FAMAS Award for Best Supporting Actress. Romero also ventured television in the late 1980s. One of her earliest television shows was the ABS-CBN sitcom Palibhasa Lalake. The program consistently performed well in ratings and earned her a Star Award for Best Comedy Actress.

In 1989, Romero appeared in another Nora Aunor vehicle, Bilangin ang Bituin sa Langit. Her portrayal earned her another FAMAS Best Supporting Actress nomination. She continued acting in various films while taking roles in television. In 1990, she played the matriarch Octavia in the revenge drama Kapag Langit ang Humatol. In 1996, she starred on the television series Familia Zaragoza. It was followed by the series Labs Ko si Babe (1999). The series was the first Filipino romantic-comedy drama in television and one of the longest-running shows of ABS-CBN.

=== 1999–2010: Resurgence ===
In 1999, Romero was cast in the romantic comedy Dahil May Isang Ikaw and earned her a Young Critics Circle citation. The following year, she led an ensemble cast in the family drama Tanging Yaman which competed at the Metro Manila Film Festival. Her portrayal, of what Philippine Daily Inquirer contributor Lito Zulueta described as "credible" and "competent", drew rave reviews from critics and swept the awards season the following year. Commercially, the film became Romero's biggest commercial success with over ₱167 million and was the third all-time highest-grossing Star Cinema-produced film as of June 2003.

Romero returned to the film festival the following year through the horror comedy Bahay ni Lola. Though the film received mixed reviews, it was a commercial success with box-office receipts exceeding ₱100 million and became the highest-grossing film of that years festival. Following its success, a spin-off Singsing ni Lola was released in 2002 with an increased production budget of a reported ₱40 million. The film performed moderately at the box-office, grossing ₱5 million on its first day. Also in 2002, she played a supporting role in the situational comedy OK Fine, 'To ang Gusto Nyo!. On February 4, 2003, Romero was announced as the image model for Ricky Reyes' hair salon chain and was the only septuagenarian with billboard advertisements placed all over EDSA.

The same year, Romero was cast in the coming-of-age drama Magnifico. Produced for a reported ₱27 million, the film initially received favorable reviews and earned Romero the Gawad Urian and Luna Awards for Best Supporting Actress. The film was distributed in several international film festivals, including the Berlin International Film Festival where it was awarded the Kinderfest Crystal Bear and Grand Jury Award. She next worked with filmmaker Gil Portes in the drama Beautiful Life in 2004, a film that tackled women from varied social classes. For her role, she earned her fifth Luna Award nomination. Romero's next roles were minor appearances in Moments of Love in 2006, Bahay Kubo: A Pinoy Mano Po! in 2007, and Paupahan the following year, the latter of which earned her a Star Award nomination.

Fuchsia (2009) featured Romero with Eddie Garcia, whom she worked with many times, and Robert Arevalo. The film won her a Golden Screen Award for Best Actress and nomination for a Star Award for Movie Actress of the Year. Also in 2009, she reunited with Eddie Garcia and Dolphy in the comedy film Nobody, Nobody But... Juan. An official entry to the 35th Metro Manila Film Festival, it was one of the festival's least performing films at the box-office, grossing nearly ₱32 million. Romero began to appear in less films but remained active on television. She next played minor and supporting roles in May Bukas Pa (2009), Kung Tayo'y Magkakalayo and Kokey at Ako (both in 2010), which were her last projects under ABS-CBN. Also in 2010, she appeared in Wenn V. Deramas' commercially successful remake of Petrang Kabayo.

=== 2011–2025: Later years and final projects ===
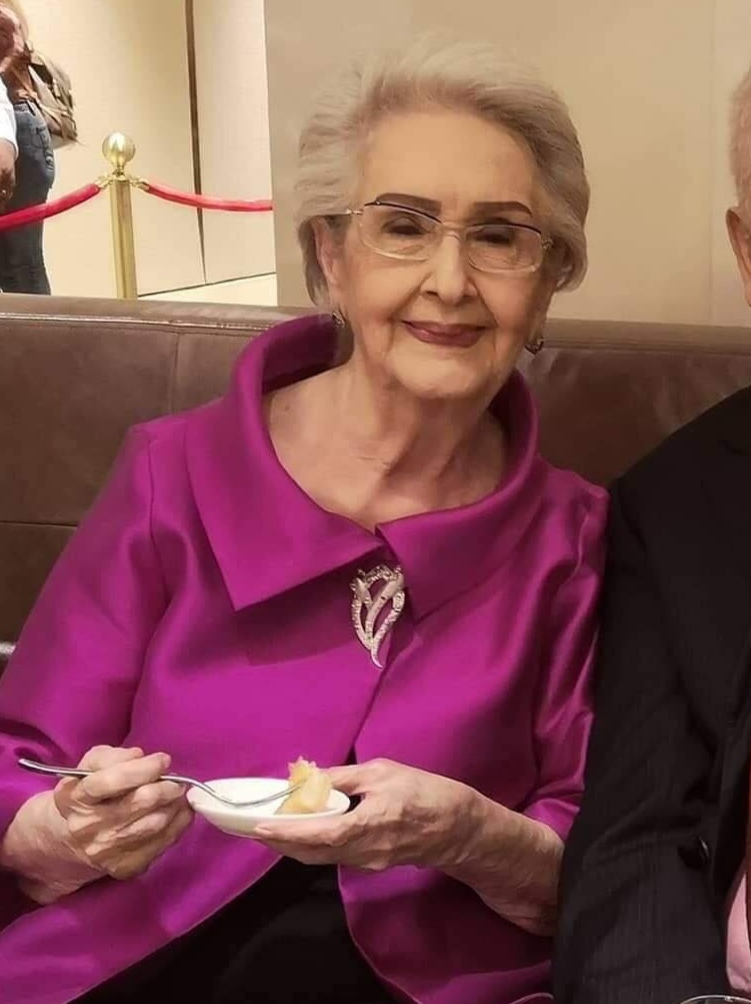
Romero at the 2018 Metro Manila Film Festival Gabi ng Parangal

After 24 years with ABS-CBN, she transferred to GMA Network and worked on her first show Munting Heredera (2011). The series drew high viewership, garnering 49.5% peak ratings in Mega Manila households and was extended for ten more weeks due to its success. In 2012, she was honored with an Ading Fernando Lifetime Achievement at the 26th PMPC Star Awards for Television.

In 2012 she played as Evil Señora Soledad Silvestre in Makapiling Kang Muli which making her first vicious role. The 78-year-old Movie Queen explains why she accepted the role: “Nagustuhan ko kaagad kasi ibang-iba siya from... other roles I did sa ibang mga drama series. I said yes kaagad kasi malaking challenge ito for me. Paano ko magagampanan ito sa edad ko ngayon? Ito ang mga gusto kong roles and I had a great time with the whole cast. Starring Richard Gutierrez, Sarah Lahbati, Carla Abellana, and Mark Anthony Fernandez.

The following year, she starred alongside Heart Evangelista and Geoff Eigenmann in the series Forever. The series debuted with high viewership, attaining 15.3% ratings in Mega Manila households. In 2014, she was cast in the series Niño starring Miguel Tanfelix and David Remo. According to AGB Neilsen, the series attained 30.4% TV ratings on Mega Manila households. She also played supporting roles in several television series such as The Rich Man's Daughter (2015), Juan Happy Love Story (2016) also she cast two series in (2017) Meant to Be (2017) Kambal Karibal also in (2017) starring Kyline Alcantara, Bianca Umali, Miguel Tanfelix and Pauline Mendoza. In 2017, she played a supporting role as Rosa Batungbakal in the film Ang Panday starring Coco Martin.

The same year, she top billed the drama fantasy anthology Daig Kayo ng Lola Ko, which would eventually become her last television show. Aired and produced by GMA Network, the series won numerous accolades throughout its run including three PMPC Star Awards for Television as "Best Horror/Fantasy Program". Following the COVID-19 pandemic in early 2020, Romero took a break from the series. She made a special appearance in 2022 for the fifth anniversary of the anthology series.

In 2018, she starred with Eddie Garcia and Tony Mabesa in the family drama LGBT-themed film Rainbow's Sunset. It was an official entry to the Metro Manila Film Festival and grossed an estimated 50 million at the box-office. Romero's performance was also met with praise from critics and audiences, winning "Best Actress" at the International Film Festival Manhattan and MMFF, including nominations at The EDDYS and PMPC Star Awards for Movies. In 2019, she was honored with the "Mga Natatanging Bituin ng Siglo" award at the PMPC Star Awards for Movies, recognizing her significant contributions to Philippine cinema.

In celebration of her 90th birthday, Romero made her first public appearance at the Sampaguita Studios in Quezon City since the COVID-19 pandemic. The event was attended by Barbara Perez, Celia Rodriguez, Helen Gamboa, Liza Lorena and Gina Alajar among others. Romero was bestowed a two-hour Manila Hotel tribute on February 28, 2024, organized by Daisy Romualdez, making it her final public appearance.

== Other ventures ==
=== Pageantry and stage work ===
Romero was crowned Miss Visayas at the Boys Town Carnival in 1954, finishing as third runner-up to the Miss Philippines titleholder Maria Teresa Larrazabal. For her win, she received ₱3,000 cash prize. During the pageant, she wore a creation designed by Ramon Valera. Although she was often encouraged to pursue pageantry further, Romero chose to prioritize her acting career with Sampaguita Pictures.

From 1954 to 1956, Romero performed in the annual Lenten play Martir sa Golgota. Her casting as the Blessed Virgin Mary was recommended by the theater group Dramatic Philippines, a role that received formal approval from the Archbishop of Manila, Rufino Santos. The production premiered during Holy Week at the Manila Grand Opera House and was attended by high profile personalities, including Philippine President Ramon Magsaysay.

=== Modeling ===
Romero was one of the original models of Karilagan International, founded by Conchita Sunico in the early 1960s. The production helped promote Philippine fashion globally and toured numerous cities in the United States. Standing at 5'6" and weighing 115 pounds, Romero was one of Ramon Valera's signature model and muse. She was handpicked by Valera for the Oka-Valera Collections fashion show in 1960, which was held at the Manila Hotel Fiesta Pavilion. According to columnist Danny Dolor, she was the most applauded at the event. Writing for Kislap Graphic, Ricardo Fermin stated that Ramon Valera "drafted Gloria into modelling, and is usually credited with having helped her acquire polish as a model." Fermin also added that Valera admired her for projecting the clothes first before herself and argued that among the movie stars, Romero was the "most in demand as a model."

In 1962, Romero took part in the Seattle World's Fair where she was sent as one of the Philippine representatives. Cultural writer and socialite Bambi Harper, who also participated in the event, stated that Romero "was never a prima donna" and revealed that "she was a favorite among the organizers and the crowds. We were a big hit!". Following the exposition in Seattle, Romero modeled for Pitoy Moreno the following year in Karilagan '63, a month-long runway event held in several cities in the U.S., including Honolulu, Seattle, San Francisco, San Diego and Los Angeles.

== Personal life ==
=== Marriage ===
On September 24, 1960, Romero married fellow Sampaguita Pictures actor Juancho Gutierrez at the Santuario de San Antonio in Forbes Park, Makati. Romero's bridal gown was designed by National Artist for Fashion Ramón Valera. The entourage included the biggest stars of Sampaguita Pictures. The bridesmaids were Daisy Romualdez, Barbara Perez, Susan Roces and Amalia Fuentes. The wedding was covered by all the major newspapers and magazines and radios, headlined "Wedding of the Year".

The couple had one daughter, Maritess Gutierrez, who tried acting briefly, and became a chef. Romero had a grandson, Chris Gutierrez, a former artist of Star Magic.

=== Separation ===
The couple separated after 12 years of marriage in 1972, and Gloria did not marry again. In 2000, Juancho suffered a diabetic stroke that left him paralysed and reunited him with his wife Gloria, who took care of him until Juancho's death on October 2, 2005.

== Death and memorial ==
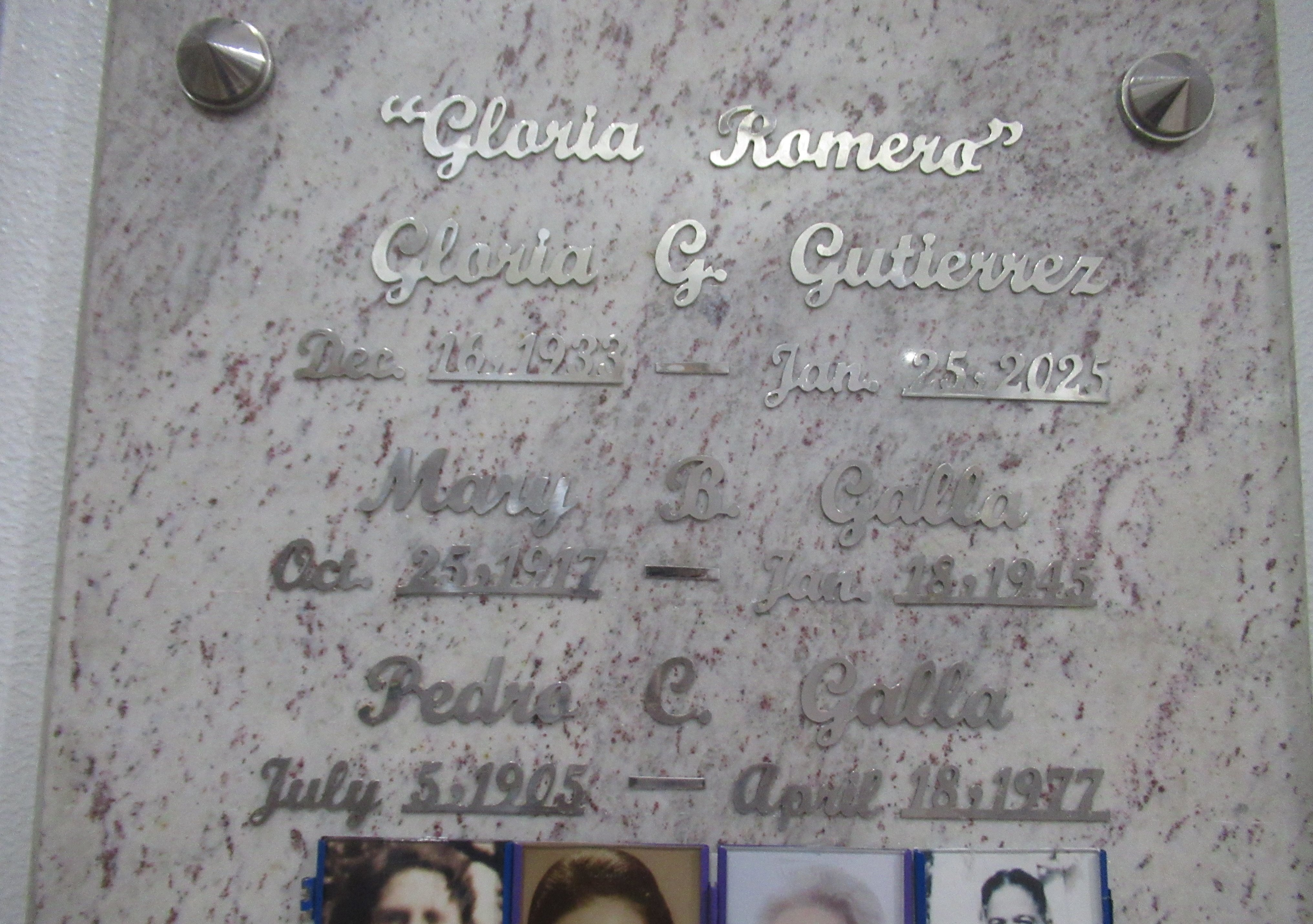
Romero's grave at the Mount Carmel Shrine columbarium in Quezon City

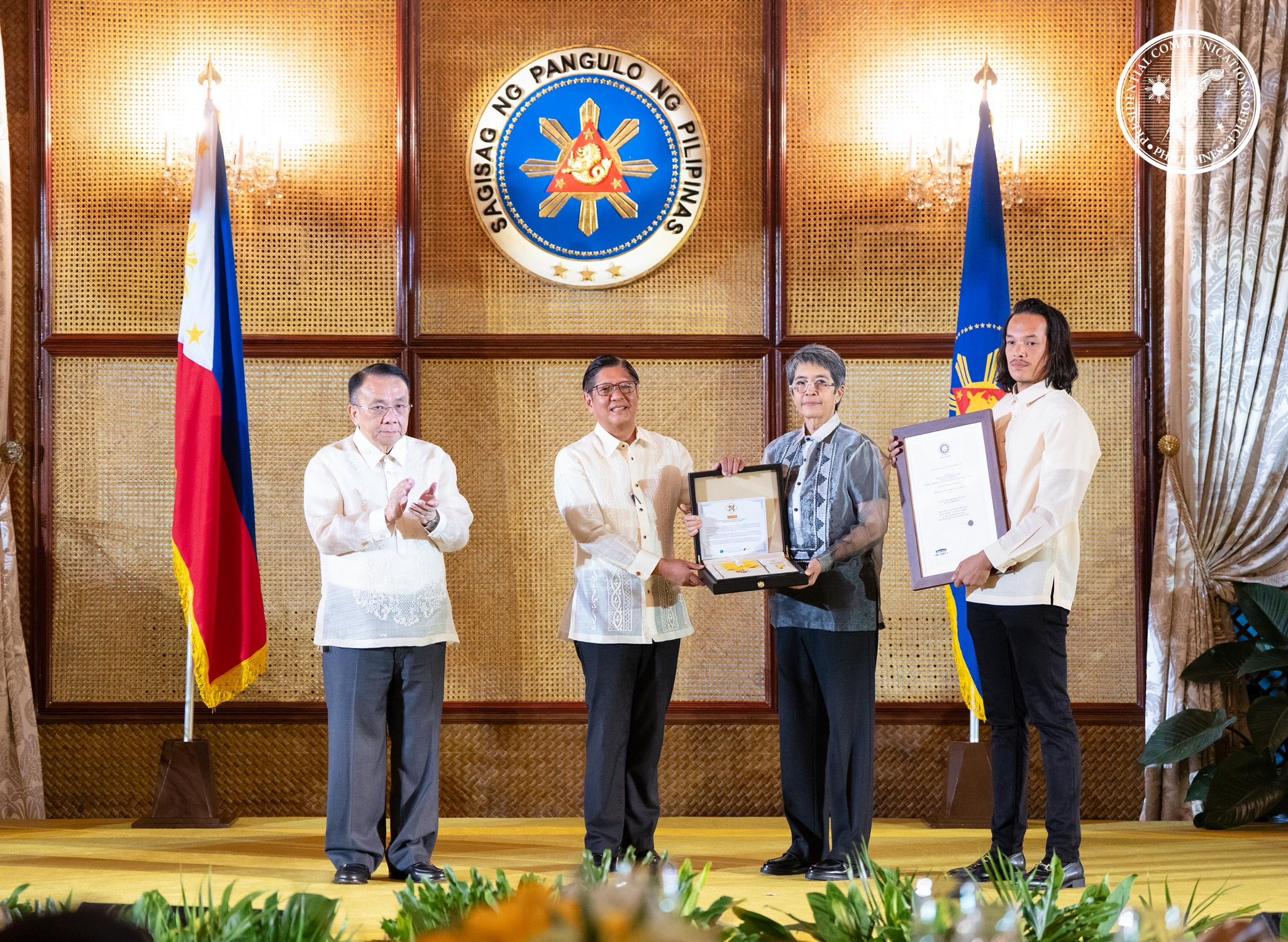
Philippine president Bongbong Marcos with Romero's daughter Maritess Gutierrez and grandson Chris Gutierrez, posthumously honoring Romero with the Presidential Medal of Merit at the Malacañan Palace.

Romero died on January 25, 2025, in Quezon City, at the age of 91. On December 31, 2024, she was rushed from her residence in New Manila, Quezon City, to the nearby St. Luke's Medical Center by her daughter, Maritess Gutierrez, after refusing to eat. After a 16-day hospitalization, she was discharged and placed under 24-hour home medical care. Her blood pressure dropped on January 22, 2025, and she died at her home three days later. Her wake was held at the Arlington Memorial Chapel in Quezon City. Her remains were cremated on January 29, 2025, and inurned in a columbarium next to her parents, Pedro Galla and Mary Borrego-Galla, at Mt. Carmel Shrine in Quezon City.

Following her death, several public figures and colleagues issued tributes. Philippine President Bongbong Marcos wrote: "I first met Gloria Romero on the set while filming Iginuhit ng Tadhana, and have been an admirer of her work as an actress ever since. She was always a great lady with the dignity of a true star," adding, "Not just a brilliant artist but a very fine person, the world of Filipino cinema and all of entertainment will never forget her." Manila Mayor Honey Lacuna declared a three-day mourning period in Romero's honor, stating: "Manila is grateful to Gloria Romero for having served as a guiding star of Filipino performing arts, culture, and family values." Former Philippine President and actor Joseph Estrada was among those who attended her wake. Media executive Charo Santos-Concio wrote: "Tita [Auntie] Glo had this remarkable way of making everyone around her feel valued and respected. She treated every role with the same reverence."

She grew with the film and the television industry, or perhaps, and I think this is even more accurate, the industry grew around the one and only Gloria Romero.

— Bongbong Marcos on Romero, 2025

On January 29, 2025, Senate President Pro Tempore Jinggoy Estrada filed Senate Resolution No. 1290 honoring Romero, stating that she "had a significant role in enriching Philippine cinema and culture." The House of Representatives also adopted House Resolution No. 2198, filed by Cavite representatives Lani Mercado, Jolo Revilla, and Bryan Revilla, in commemoration of her life and legacy. The resolution stated: "Beyond her professional achievements, [Romero] was deeply admired for her warmth, humility, and kindness, leaving an indelible impression on her colleagues and serving as an inspiration to generations of Filipino artists." On February 3, 2025, the Senate of the Philippines adopted Resolution No. 1287 honoring the life and career of Romero. Senator Grace Poe, who sponsored the resolution, described Romero as a "cultural institution" and trailblazer who helped define the golden age of Philippine cinema, adding that she left "an indelible mark on our nation's cultural identity."

Film Development Council of the Philippines chairperson Jose Javier Reyes stated that Romero should be considered for National Artist, saying she "was more than just a symbol of Philippine movies, she represented an entire history." Daily Tribune contributor Butch Francisco likewise considered Romero artistically qualified for the National Artist for Film and Broadcast Arts, though he noted her American citizenship made her ineligible. On May 4, 2025, Romero was posthumously conferred the Presidential Medal of Merit by President Bongbong Marcos for her service to the arts. Google's "Year in Search" report for the Philippines in 2025 listed Romero as the sixth most searched individual in the "Farewells" category. On January 9, 2026, the British Film Institute (BFI), through its film magazine Sight and Sound, included Romero in its annual feature "In memoriam: obituaries of those who died in 2025" as a tribute and historical record of important film figures.

== Public image ==
With her stately beauty, impeccable grace, and regal bearing, Gloria is the quintessential Philippine movie star. She is as beautiful as they come, but she could have been waylaid by the vagaries of fate that usually attend those who aspire for renown: dissipation, dissolution, and loss of audience and fame. But she has avoided all of these, and even if she is not anymore the superstar that she was in the 1950s ... she is at least the figure against whom every star, aspiring or established, measures herself. She is not only admired for her longevity, she is also respected for her accomplishments. She is not only a survivor—she is an icon.

— Lito Zulueta, columnist and Manunuri ng Pelikulang Pilipino member (2004), Quoted in BusinessMirror (2025)

In the Philippine press, Romero's public image was defined by her classic mestiza features and understated elegance. Writing for Malaya Business Insight, Gay Ace Domingo noted that her look and tall frame "became a standard of beauty during the 1950s to the 1960s." Entertainment writer Boy Villasanta similarly described her as a magnetic, enigmatic "symbol of classic beauty" molded in the Hollywood tradition. Because of her "sophisticated," "modest," and "quiet and gentle gestures," the media frequently dubbed her the "Grace Kelly of the Philippines". Beyond her physical appearance, colleagues and commentators emphasized her demeanor; Daily Tribune writer Edu Jarque called her a "true class act" admired for her kindness and humility, while hairstylist Ricky Reyes—who worked with Romero on beauty campaigns—remarked that she epitomized "great character, good values, everything that makes a woman beautiful not just physically but spiritually as well".

Within the entertainment industry, Romero was widely recognized for her longevity and professionalism. Philippine Daily Inquirer critic Nestor Torre Jr. described her as "a true lover of the film craft and complete professional", noting her enduring commitment to Filipino cinema. Actress Iza Calzado remarked that she was inspired by the respect Romero commanded among her peers, noting that "when people talk about [Romero], they talk about how nice she is." Film producer Violetta Sevilla similarly described her as a "role model of everything", citing Romero's beauty and character. Other figures in Philippine entertainment—including Vilma Santos, Susan Roces, Amalia Fuentes, Lorna Tolentino, Cherry Pie Picache, Dingdong Dantes, Mylene Dizon, and Boy Abunda—have cited her as a major influence or expressed admiration for her work and character. Reflecting her enduring popularity, she was featured three times on Yes! magazine's annual list of 100 Most Beautiful Stars.

Lifestyle Asia identified Romero as a pivotal figure who redefined the Filipino "It girl" by bridging the gap between exclusive high-society and broader media stardom. Also active as a model in her youth, she was named by Philippine Daily Inquirer columnist Behn Cervantes as one of the most popular models in high-society fashion shows, while Amrie Cruz of the women's lifetyle website Preen.ph, included her on a list of the five most stylish actresses of the 1950s, writing that "Romero built a reputation as one of the most beautiful faces during the golden age of Philippine cinema." Fashion editor Randz Manucom similarly noted that Romero's "wardrobe mirrored the glamour of Sampaguita Pictures' golden era" and highlighted "her ability to adapt her style with each phase of her career."

== Legacy ==
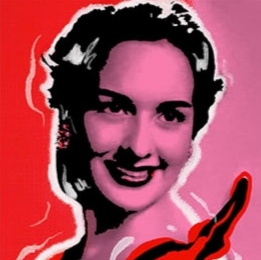
Romero, as depicted in a PhilPost commemorative post stamp

The Manila Times described Romero as an "iconic figure in [the] Philippine film industry", and media outlets widely recognized her as one of the last surviving stars of the Golden Age of Philippine cinema. (Note: Attributed to multiple sources:) Cultural commentators and journalists, including Bong Godinez and Nathalie Tomada, have highlighted her enduring influence on Philippine arts and entertainment. In his book Huwaran/hulmahan Atbp., film writer Johven Velasco credited Romero with breaking social barriers that previously excluded film actors from upward mobility. During the 1950s and 1960s, societal attitudes toward actors—particularly women—were often dismissive, as they were generally viewed as entertainers from a lower social stratum. The Philippine Star columnist Jerry Donato similarly noted that her longevity and public image established a blueprint for a successful career in the local entertainment industry.

Dubbed the "Queen of Philippine Cinema", (Note: Attributed to multiple sources:) Romero was frequently cited among the greatest Filipino actresses of all time. In 2001, film director Laurice Guillen remarked that Romero was "at par with some of the world's best actresses", adding that her talent was "seldom notice[d] because her style is light and restrained". Writing for the Philippine Daily Inquirer, Behn Cervantes characterized her as an "underrated dramatic actress" who set high industry standards through her ability to "quietly listen and deliver her lines with ease and surprising depth". Film critic Nestor Torre Jr. praised her performance in Tanging Yaman (2000), writing that "only an actress of Gloria's experience, sensitivity and age could have come up to the role's rigorous demands". Despite critical acclaim later in her life, Romero experienced a 32-year gap between major competitive acting wins; following her first victory for Dalagang Ilocana in 1955, she did not win another until Saan Nagtatago ang Pag-ibig? in 1987.

Media outlets have frequently referred to Romero as the Philippines' "longest-reigning" movie queen. (Note: Attributed to multiple sources:) Described as the highest-drawing box-office star of the 1950s, her films achieved commercial success both domestically and across Asia. In 1957, she was reported as the highest-paid Filipino actress, having earned $45,000 the previous year. Film director and Film Development Council of the Philippines chairperson Jose Javier Reyes described her as the "epitome not only of professionalism" but of classic Philippine cinema as a whole.

As she continued to earn critical acclaim in her later career, Fred Hawson of ABS-CBN News praised her "powerful screen presence" in the 2018 family drama Rainbow's Sunset, writing that "a mere sad look or crack in her voice could already make tears well in my eyes". Several of her films have also been featured on retrospective lists by Philippine lifestyle publications: Bahay ni Lola (2001) ranked second on When in Manila's list of the "10 Most Unforgettable Pinoy Horror Films", while Spot.ph included her confrontation scene with Nora Aunor in Condemned (1984) among its "Top 10 Most Epic Dramatic Showdowns in Pinoy Movies".

== Acting credits ==
Romero's most acclaimed and commercially successful films include Musikong Bumbong (1953), Cofradia (1953), Dalagang Ilocana (1954), Kurdapya (1954), Alaalang Banal (1958), Despatsadora (1955), Hongkong Holiday (1956), Sino Ang May Sala? (1957), Ikaw Ang Aking Buhay (1959), Iginuhit ng Tadhana (1965), Lipad, Darna, Lipad! (1973), Condemned (1984), Saan Nagtatago ang Pag-ibig? (1987), Nagbabagang Luha (1988), Bilangin ang Bituin sa Langit (1989), Tanging Yaman (2000), Bahay Ni Lola (2001), I Think I'm in Love (2002), Magnifico (2003), Beautiful Life (2004), Fuchsia (2009), Tarima (2010), and Rainbow's Sunset (2018).

== Awards and honours ==
At age 85, she became the oldest woman to win Best Actress at the Metro Manila Film Festival for her role in Rainbow's Sunset (2018). She won three competitive FAMAS Awards: Best Actress for Dalagang Ilocana (1954) and Tanging Yaman (2000), and Best Supporting Actress for Nagbabagang Luha (1988). She also won two competitive Gawad Urian Awards: Best Actress for Tanging Yaman (2000) and Best Supporting Actress for Magnifico (2003). Additionally, she won three competitive Metro Manila Film Festival Awards: Best Actress for Tanging Yaman (2000) and Rainbow's Sunset (2018), and Best Supporting Actress for I Think I'm in Love (2002).

Romero won three Luna Awards from the Film Academy of the Philippines: Best Actress for Tanging Yaman, and Best Supporting Actress for Saan Nagtatago Ang Pag-ibig? and Magnifico. She also earned two competitive PMPC Star Awards for Movies for Best Supporting Actress for Saan Nagtatago ang Pag-ibig? (1987) and Tarima (2010). For her performance in the sitcom Palibhasa Lalake (1987), she won Best Comedy Actress at the PMPC Star Awards for Television. Internationally, Romero won Best Actress at the 2019 International Film Festival Manhattan for her role in Rainbow's Sunset, where the cast also received the Best Ensemble Acting award.

=== Honours ===
Romero was posthumously conferred the Presidential Medal of Merit in 2025 by Philippine president Bongbong Marcos. In 2005, the National Commission for Culture and the Arts presented her with the Pama-As Gintong Bai Award for her contributions to Philippine cinema. Romero became the first recipient of Movie and Television Review and Classification Board's Lifetime Achievement Award in 2009. The Film Development Council of the Philippines also honored her with the Ilaw ng Industriya Award in 2021 and a Lifetime Achievement Award in 2024 "for serving as a veritable matriarch to the film industry and as a beacon of professional artistry and sublime inspiration to generations of film actors." In 2022, the Philippine Postal Corporation issued a commemorative stamp featuring Romero as part of the "Living Legends: Outstanding Filipinos" series.

Numerous organizations have presented Romero with Lifetime Achievement Awards, including the Cinemanila International Film Festival (2001), Luna Awards (2002), FAMAS and Gawad Urian(2004), and Star Awards for Television (2008). Her other special accolades include the Star Awards for Movies' Ulirang Artista Award in 1995 and Outstanding Star of the Century Award in 2019, the FAMAS Huwarang Bituin Award in 2009 and Iconic Movie Queen of Philippine cinema in 2015. She also received the Golden Screen Award for Movie Icon of Our Time, the Golden Jury for All-time Favorite Actress in 2019, and the posthumous Entertainment Icon Award from the Box Office Entertainment Awards. She was inducted into the Eastwood City Walk of Fame in 2005.

== See also ==
- List of Filipino actresses
- Cinema of the Philippines
- Television in the Philippines
- Golden Age of Philippine cinema
