= List of nicknames in Philippine entertainment =

This is a list of nicknames used in Philippine entertainment.

== Individuals ==
=== A ===
- Carla Abellana – "Kapuso Primetime Goddess"
- Boy Abunda – "King of Talk"
- Kyline Alcantara – "New Gen It Girl"
- Ogie Alcasid – "Chief of OPM", "The Songwriter"
- Bea Alonzo – "Golden Star", "Movie Queen of the New Generation"
- Gerald Anderson – "Action-Drama Prince"
- Kris Aquino – "Queen of All Media", "Queen of Talk"
- Nora Aunor – "Superstar"
- Dingdong Avanzado – "Prince of Pinoy pop"
- Ritz Azul – "The Bombshell"

=== B ===
- Carol Banawa – "Star Diva"
- Claudine Barretto – "Teleserye Queen", "Optimum Star"
- Christian Bautista – "Asian Pop Idol", "Asia's Romantic Balladeer"
- Mark Bautista – "Pop Hearthrob"
- Janine Berdin – "Gem of OPM"
- Kathryn Bernardo – "Box Office Queen", "Asia's Superstar"
- Dina Bonnevie – "Drama Queen" of her generation
- AC Bonifacio – "New Gen Dance Princess"
- Andrea Brillantes – "Tween Princess", "Gen Z Queen"

=== C ===
- Iza Calzado – "Goddess of Horror Films"
- Jose Mari Chan – "Father of Filipino Christmas Songs"
- Ken Chan – "Kapuso Ultimate Actor"
- Kim Chiu – "Multimedia Idol", "Queen of the Dancefloor"
- KC Concepcion – "Mega Daughter"
- Yeng Constantino – "Pop Rock Royalty"
- Sharon Cuneta – "Megastar"
- Anne Curtis – "National Sweetheart", "Social Media Queen", "Multimedia Superstar""The Goddess","Goddess Star"
- John Lloyd Cruz – "King of RomCom", "King of Contemporary Cinema"
- Sheryl Cruz – "Princess of the Philippine Cinema"
- Lilia Cuntapay – "Queen of Philippine Horror Movies"

=== D ===
- Dingdong Dantes – "Kapuso Primetime King"
- Glaiza de Castro – "Asia's Acting Gem"
- Janice De Belen – "Horror Queen of Philippine Cinema"
- Moira Dela Torre – "Queen of Sentimental Songs", "Most Streamed Filipina Artist"
- Ai-Ai delas Alas – "Comedy Concert Queen", "Comedy Queen of Philippine Cinema"
- Alessandra De Rossi – "Actress of the Decade"
- Sunshine Dizon – "Kapuso Daytime Drama Queen"
- Dolphy – "King of Comedy"
- Eugene Domingo – "Comedy Star for All Seasons"
- Klarisse De Guzman – “Philippine Soul Diva”

=== E ===
- Andi Eigenmann – "Heiress of Drama"
- Darren Espanto – "Asia's Pop Hearthrob", "The Total Performer"
- Heart Evangelista – "The Global Fashion Icon", "Queen of Fashion"
- Kiko Estrada – "Kapatid Primetime Prince"

=== F ===
- Pops Fernandez – "Concert Queen"
- Rudy Fernandez – "Philippine Cinema Prince of Action"
- Barbie Forteza – "Kapuso Primetime Princess"

=== G ===
- Eddie Garcia – "Father of Philippine Cinema"
- Gabbi Garcia – "Kapuso Millennial It Girl", "Global Endorser"
- Sarah Geronimo – "Asia's Popstar Royalty", "Philippines' Queen of Pop"
- Janno Gibbs – "King of Soul"
- Cherie Gil – "La Primera Contravida"
- Enrique Gil – "King of the Gil"
- Gloc-9 – "Wordsmith of Rap"
- Rachelle Ann Go – "International Theater Diva", "Fierce Songstress"
- Toni Gonzaga – "RomCom Queen", "Ultimate Multimedia Star"
- Erich Gonzales – "Television Sweetheart"
- Joshua Garcia – "New Gen Ultimate Leading Man"
- Janine Gutierrez – "Asia's Rising Star"
- Richard Gutierrez – "Primetime Royalty", "King of Telefantasya"

=== H ===
- Mark Herras – "Bad Boy of the Dance Floor"
- Kristine Hermosa – "Goddess of Philippine TV & Movie"

=== I ===
- Elia Ilano – "Future Super Actress"

=== J ===
- Jay R – "King of R&B"
- Jaya – "Queen of Soul"
- Jaclyn Jose – "Queen of Underacting"

=== K ===
- Karylle – "Enchanting Diva"
- Kyla – "R&B and Soul Princess", "Queen of R&B"

=== L ===
- Angel Locsin – "Action Drama Queen""Queen of Telefantasya","Dynamic Star"
- Sanya Lopez – "First lady of Primetime"
- Nadine Lustre – "Estetik Queen""The President""Multimedia Princess" "Omnimedia Superstar","President Star","Multi-hypenate Star"

=== M ===
- Jed Madela – "World Champion" "The Voice""The Singer's Singer"
- Ruru Madrid – "Kapuso Action-Drama Prince""Primetime Action Hero"
- Elmo Magalona – "Heir of Rap"
- Francis Magalona – "Francis M", "Master Rapper", "King of Pinoy Rap"
- Jolina Magdangal - "Philippine Pop Icon", Original "Multimedia Superstar","Queen of Philippine Pop Culture"
- Shaina Magdayao - "Empress of Drama"
- Luis Manzano – "Pambansang Host"
- Bamboo Mañalac – "Rock Icon"
- Coco Martin – "Prince of Philippine Independent Films", "Teleserye King", "Kapamilya Primetime King"
- Albert Martinez – "King of Philippine Teleseryes"
- Aiko Melendez – "Ultimate Star in Her Generation"
- Maine Mendoza – "Phenomenal Star""Queen of Dubsmash"
- Ara Mina – "Millennium Goddess"
- Lani Misalucha – "Asia's Nightingale"
- Jennylyn Mercado – "Asia's Ultimate Star""Rom-Com Queen"
- Julia Montes – "Royal Princess of Drama""Kapamilya Daytime Drama Queen"
- Vina Morales – "Ultimate Performer"
- Morissette – "Asia's Phoenix"
- Aga Muhlach – "King of Romance-Drama","Original Heartthrob"

=== N ===
- Vhong Navarro – "King of the Dance floor"
- Martin Nievera – "Concert King"

=== P ===
- Donny Pangilinan - "New Gen Matinee Idol"
- Daniel Padilla – "Supreme Idol"
- Kylie Padilla – "Kapuso Action-Drama Princess"
- Robin Padilla – "Bad Boy of Philippine Cinema"
- Zsa Zsa Padilla – "Divine Diva"
- Angelica Panganiban – "Queen of Drama"
- Charice Pempengco – "International Singing Sensation"
- Rica Peralejo – "Filmfest Queen of Horror Suspense movie"
- Fernando Poe Jr. – "Da King", "Action King", "King of Philippine Movies"
- Lovi Poe – "Supreme Actress"
- Pokwang – "Empress of Comedy"
- Richard Poon – "Big Band Crooner"
- Piolo Pascual – "Ultimate Heartthrob" "Asia's Drama Superstar"
- Camille Prats – Original "Princess of Drama"

=== Q ===
- Angeline Quinto – "Power Diva" "Queen of Teleserye Theme Songs"

=== R ===
- Maris Racal – "The All-Purpose Queen","Meme Queen"
- Derek Ramsay – "Universal Leading Man"
- Sheryn Regis – "Crystal Voice of Asia"
- James Reid – “Multimedia Prince”
- Gladys Reyes – "Primera Kontrabida"
- Cristine Reyes – "Philippine TV Goddess",Jewel of Drama
- Manilyn Reynes – "The Star of All Decades"
- Alden Richards – "Box Office King", "Asia's Multimedia Star" "Pambabsang Bae"
- April Boy Regino – "OPM Icon","Jukebox King"
- Marian Rivera – “Kapuso Primetime Queen” and “Queen of Philippine Movies of Her Generation”
- Susan Roces – "Queen of Philippine Movies"
- Dimples Romana – "Daytime Teleserye Queen"
- Gloria Romero – "Queen of Philippine Cinema"
- Jericho Rosales – "Asian Drama King"

=== S ===
- Lea Salonga – "International Broadway Diva"
- Janella Salvador – "OPM Pop Sweetheart"
- Maja Salvador – "Dance Royalty" "Queen of the Dancefloor""Majestic Superstar""Queen of Revenge Drama"
- Julie Anne San Jose – "Asia's Pop Sweetheart", "Asia's Limitless Star"
- Randy Santiago – "Mr. Shades", "Mr. Private Eyes"
- Aicelle Santos – "Rock&Soul Diva","Soul Flair Songstress"
- Erik Santos – "Pop Ballad Royalty" "Prince of Pop""King of Teleserye Theme Songs"
- Judy Ann Santos – "Queen of Pinoy Soap Opera""Prime Superstars"
- Vilma Santos – "Star for All Seasons"
- Shaira — "Queen of Bangsamoro Pop"
- Ice Seguerra — "Asia's Acoustic Sensation"
- Snooky Serna — "Eternal Star"
- Pepe Smith – "King of Pinoy Rock & Roll"
- Liza Soberano – "Asia's Goddess"
- Maricel Soriano – "Diamond Star"
- Jodi Sta. Maria – "Asia's Best Actress"

=== T ===
- Miguel Tanfelix – "Kapuso Ultimate Heartthrob"
- Lorna Tolentino – "Prime Star", "Grandslam Queen"
- Dennis Trillo – "Kapuso Drama King"

=== U ===
- Bianca Umali – "Epic-serye Princess", "Kapuso Primetime Gem"

=== V ===
- Gary Valenciano – "Mr. Pure Energy", "Michael Jackson of the Philippines"
- Katrina Velarde – "The Vocal Supreme"
- Regine Velasquez – "Asia's Songbird"
- Ian Veneracion – "Primetime Hearthrob"
- Vice Ganda – "Asia’s Phenomenal Superstar"
- Jona Viray – "Asia's Fearless Diva"

=== W ===
- Jillian Ward – "Star of the New Gen", "Kapuso Afternoon Prime Princess", "Kapuso Teen Queen"

=== Z ===
- Jessa Zaragosa – "Phenomenal Diva"

== Groups ==
- BGYO – "Aces of P-pop"
- Eraserheads – "The Beatles of the Philippines"
- Parokya ni Edgar – "The National Band of the Philippines"
- SB19 – "P-pop Kings"
- BINI – "Nation's Girl Group"
- G22 – "P-pop's Female Alphas"
- VXON – "Monster Rookies of Ppop"
- Regine Velasquez, Jaya (singer), Lani Misalucha – "The Vocal Trinity"

== See also ==
- Honorific nicknames in popular music
