= Bahay ni Lola =

2001 comedy horror film

- Promotional poster
- Directed by: Rosauro Q. Dela Cruz
- Written by: Rosauro Q. Dela Cruz
- Produced by: Lily Y. Monteverde
- Cinematography: Charlie Peralta
- Edited by: Manet Dayrit
- Music by: Nonong Buencamino
- Production company: Regal Entertainment
- Distributed by: Regal Entertainment
- Release date: December 25, 2001
- Running time: 120 minutes
- Country: Philippines
- Language: Filipino
- Box office: ₱120 million

Bahay ni Lola (transl. "Grandmother's House") is a 2001 horror comedy film written and directed by Rosauro "Uro" Q. Dela Cruz. It features an ensemble cast that includes Gloria Romero in the title role, Ice Seguerra, Manilyn Reynes, and Gina Alajar.

Produced and distributed by Regal Films, the film was theatrically released on December 25, 2001, as part of the 27th Metro Manila Film Festival. It became the highest-grossing film of that year's festival.

== Plot ==
The story revolves around a family that gathers at their ancestral home during Christmas. Tensions within the family members lead to quarrels, and the family becomes haunted by malevolent spirits. The ghostly disturbances increase as the family's internal conflicts worsen. The only hope for the family's safety lies in the protection offered by their grandmother's guardian spirit, which battles against the demons threatening to destroy them.

== Cast ==
- Gloria Romero as Lola
- Ice Seguerra as Joey
- Manilyn Reynes as Patricia
- Gina Alajar as Dolores
- Allan K as Frank
- James Blanco as Neil
- Isabelle De Leon as Aurora
- Maybelyn Dela Cruz as Anne
- Maxene Magalona as Tintin
- Miko Sotto as Buboy
- Tirso Cruz III as Jimmy
- Keempee De Leon as Bob
- Mach Duran as Janitor
- Jojo Bolado as Janitor
- Eduardo Primitivo as Ugoy Boy
- Stephen Flojemon as Ugoy Boy
- Jaime Flores as Ugoy Boy

== Production ==
The film was produced by Regal Entertainment, a major production company in the Philippines. Directed by Uro Q. Dela Cruz, the screenplay was also written by him. The film's cinematography was handled by Charlie Peralta, and the editing was done by Manet Dayrit. Bahay ni Lola was shot in various locations within the Philippines, with the primary setting being the family's ancestral home, which served as the backdrop for much of the supernatural activity.

== Reception ==
=== Box Office ===
Bahay ni Lola reportedly earned ₱8.5 million at the Philippine box-office on its first day across Metro Manila theaters alone. The film grossed ₱8 million on its second day and finished its run as the highest-grossing entry of the festival that year, grossing ₱100 million at the box-office.

=== Critical response ===
Bahay ni Lola was praised for its unique blend of horror and comedy. Critics appreciated the film's suspenseful narrative and its ability to incorporate light-hearted moments amidst the chilling supernatural occurrences. The performances of the cast, particularly Gloria Romero and Aiza Seguerra, were also highly lauded. The film was described as both entertaining and thought-provoking, blending familial themes with supernatural horror.

== Awards and nominations ==
- 2001 Metro Manila Film Festival
  - Best Picture
  - Best Director – Uro Q. Dela Cruz
  - Best Actress – Gloria Romero
  - Best Supporting Actress – Gina Alajar
  - Best Child Performer – Aiza Seguerra
  - Best Screenplay – Uro Q. Dela Cruz
  - Best Editing – Manet Dayrit
  - Best Original Story – Uro Q. Dela Cruz

The film's success at the MMFF solidified its place as one of the standout entries in the festival that year.

== Legacy ==
Bahay ni Lola has since become a cult classic in Philippine cinema, especially noted for its unique fusion of horror, comedy, and family drama. The film is remembered for its memorable performances and its exploration of familial themes against a backdrop of supernatural events. The success of the film led to a sequel, Bahay ni Lola 2, which continued the supernatural themes introduced in the original.

Despite its comedic elements, Bahay ni Lola also dealt with serious themes of family conflicts, generational tension, and the role of ancestral heritage in the lives of the characters. It remains a significant film in the Filipino horror-comedy genre.
