= Paru-Parong Bukid =

Filipino folk song

Paru-Parong Bukid is a traditional "Kutang-Kutang" Filipino folk music which originated from "Mariposa Bella", a Filipino song in Spanish originated in the 1890s. The song "Mariposa Bella" was composed during the time of American invasion of the Philippines.

In 1938, "Mariposa Bella" was totally forgotten when "Paru-Parong Bukid" was released as a soundtrack of a film of the same title. The Tagalog rendition was composed by Felipe de León.

== In popular culture ==
A drama movie titled Paroparong Bukid was released by Sampaguita Pictures in 1938, starring Rudy Concepcion, using the folk song Paru-Parong Bukid as a soundtrack.

In 1958, a romance film Paroparong Bukid which stars Gloria Romero, Luis Gonzales and Dolphy was released by the same production company Sampaguita Pictures.

Guillermo Gómez Rivera, released an LP in 1962 entitled Nostalgia Filipina which includes the original Spanish song "Mariposa Bella".
