= Ramón Valera =

Filipino fashion designer

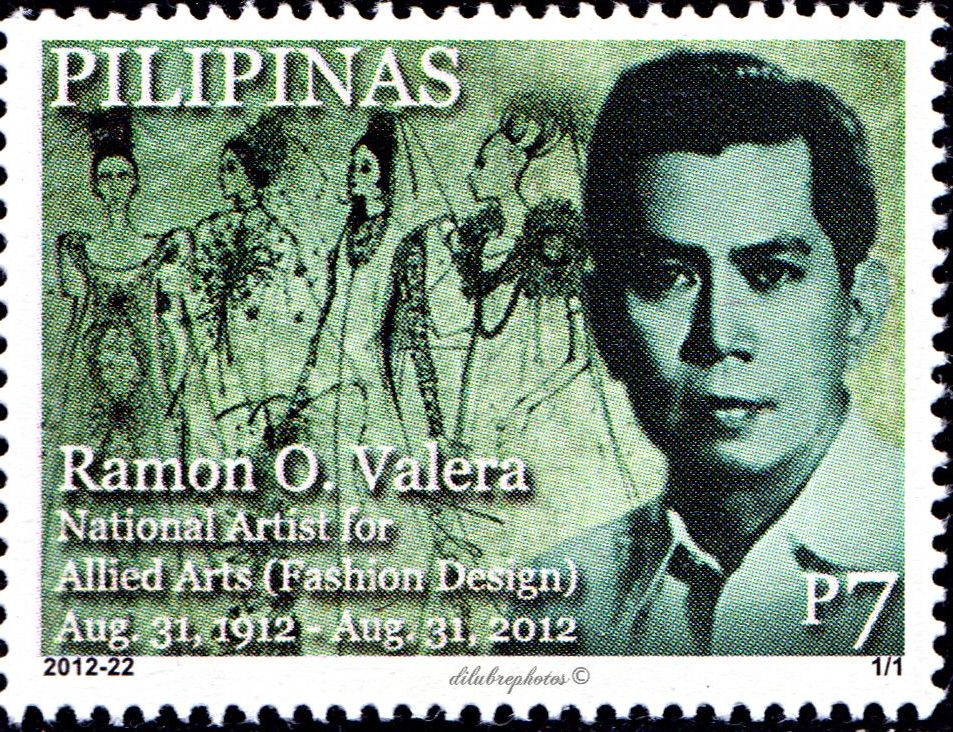
Ramon O. Valera postage stamp

Ramón Valera y Oswalds (August 31, 1912 – May 25, 1972) was a Filipino-American fashion designer who was bestowed with the National Artist of the Philippines honor in 2006. He is the first Filipino fashion designer to receive this distinction. In 2017, his work was displayed in an exhibit called Valera and the Modern: An Exhibit on the Life and Work of National Artist for Fashion Design, Ramon Valera which was curated by Gerry Torres at De La Salle-College of St. Benilde’s School of Design and Arts Gallery.

Valera's gowns have been worn by notable Filipina women including Gloria Romero, Bárbara Pérez and Imelda Marcos.

Valera was born on August 31, 1912, in Bangued, Abra, Philippine Islands to Melecio Valera and Maria del Pilar Oswalds, and finished his education in De La Salle. His siblings include of Carmen Valera-Arellano, Pilar Valera Feria and Lourdes Oswalds Valera. His half-siblings are Juanita Valera, Natividad Valera Siy and Emilio Valera.

Valera's grandson Roberto Antonio "Onie" Valera revealed continuing Valera's legacy in interior design business, with his 'Vast Solutions', in Santa Rosa, Laguna.

He was the first to introduce the one-piece terno that was fastened in the back with a zipper. He re-imagined the Maria Clara outfit by adding stiffened bell sleeves and making it into a wedding gown. He died on May 25, 1972.

== Recognition ==
In 2006, he was honored with the National Artist of the Philippines distinction. In 2007 he was named a Distinguished Lasallian by the De La Salle Alumni Association. A postage stamp was issued by the Philippine Postal Corporation on the occasion of his birth centenary in 2012.
