= Familia Zaragoza =

- Also known as: Zaragoza Family
- Genre: Drama
- Written by: Agnes Gagelonia-Uligan
- Directed by: Khryss Adalia
- Starring: Jaclyn Jose; Janice de Belen; Gloria Romero
- Theme music composer: Greg Caro
- Opening theme: May Tahanan din ang Puso Kong Ito by Therese Amper
- Country of origin: Philippines
- Original language: Tagalog
- No. of episodes: 46

Production
- Executive producers: Michael Francis Muñoz; Allan Coronel
- Production locations: Metro Manila, Philippines
- Running time: 30-60 minutes

Original release
- Network: ABS-CBN
- Release: April 28, 1996 – March 9, 1997

Familia Zaragoza (English: Zaragoza Family) is a Philippine television drama series broadcast by ABS-CBN. Starring Jaclyn Jose, Janice de Belen and Gloria Romero. It aired on the network's Sundays evening line up from April 28, 1996 to March 9, 1997, replacing Mel & Jay and was replaced by Compañero y Compañera.

== Premise ==
The story of Familia Zaragoza, an intricate web of lies and deception surrounding the Zaragoza family is engineered by a woman who is insanely driven with ambition that she would resort to manipulation, treachery, and even murder to achieve her goals. With the death of Don Luis, the patriarch of the wealthy Zaragoza clan, the dark veil of secrecy is slowly lifted as the drama begins.

The widowed Doña Amparo Zaragoza does not waste time to know how much she and her children, Divina and Alfredo, have inherited. To her surprise, most of Don Luis Zaragoza's estate is awarded to a certain Benita who is believed to be the legal wife of the deceased. Doña Amparo insists that she is the only spouse the society and the entire Zaragoza clan has known and being confined in a mental institution for so long, Benita has never been a wife to the late Don. Even though the situation does not turn out the way she has expected, Doña Amparo is confident that she will win her case believing that someone who is mentally ill could not possibly mind about her inheritance. What she does not know is that Beatrice, Don Luis and Benita's daughter and only legitimate heir who was believed to be dead, is alive and well. Deprived of her father's love and support since birth, she will try to pursue the full inheritance of her father's wealth and leave his mistress and illegitimate children with nothing.

Divina and her mother share the same fate in a way that they both have fallen deeply in love with another woman's husband. When she met Lorenzo, she knew very well that he has a wife, Ester, and has three children with her. They live in a shanty not very far away from the Zaragoza mansion. Divina had convinced Lorenzo to leave the country with her and start a new life in the United States. Lorenzo agreed, if only for the sake of his ailing wife and the future of his three children. Lorenzo worked hard to support his two families with his business in the States. But with Lorenzo's absence, Ester's children have learned to believe that their father abandoned them for a more comfortable life.

== Cast and characters ==
=== Main cast ===
- Gloria Romero as Doña Amparo Zaragoza
- Jaclyn Jose as Ester Lagrimas
- Janice de Belen as Guadalupe "Lupe" Lagrimas

=== Supporting cast ===
- Tommy Abuel as Atty. Nicolas Fuentabella
- Marvin Agustin as Nonoy
- Rita Avila as Vivian Zaragoza
- Carlo Aquino as Miguel Lagrimas
- Anton Bernardo as David
- Robin Da Roza as Ramon
- Ricky Davao as Alfredo Zaragoza
- Julio Diaz as Lorenzo Lagrimas
- John Estrada as Sgt. Charlie Rodriguez
- Luz Fernandez as Ensang
- Farah Florer as Marinella
- Emilio Garcia as Gregorio Pantaleon
- Jean Garcia as Beatrice Fuentebella
- Jason Javellona as Nick Fuentebella
- Teresa Loyzaga as Atty. Katrina Dela Costa
- Matthew Mendoza as Gabby
- Stefano Mori as Danilo Lagrimas
- Elizabeth Oropesa as Dra. Bienvenida Perea Fuentebella
- Zsa Zsa Padilla as Divina Zaragoza-Lagrimas
- Angelica Panganiban as Angelica Lagrimas
- Gina Pareño as Doña Benita Zaragoza
- Paula Peralejo as Samantha Lagrimas
- Lito Pimentel as Raul
- John Prats as Luigi Lagrimas
- Cherry Pie Picache as Elena
- Celia Rodriguez as Doña Elvira
- Glaiza Serrano as Olga Zaragoza
- Joshua Spafford as Atty. Andy Concepcion
- Lucita Soriano as Trining Toledo
- Eula Valdez as Nimfa
- Joy Viado as Mitchie
- Rubi Rosa
- Archie Adamos
- Raffy Bonanza
- Lora Luna
- Gandong Cervantes
- Timmy Diwa
- Jojo Atienza
- Zeus Inocencio

=== Guest cast ===
- Eddie Rodriguez as Don Luis Zaragoza
- Claudine Barretto as Young Amparo Zaragoza

== Reruns ==
The show began airing re-runs on Jeepney TV from May 12, 2013 to January 19, 2014; June 11 to September 21, 2018 and July 18 to December 19, 2026.

== See also ==
- List of programs broadcast by ABS-CBN
- List of ABS-CBN Studios original drama series
- List of programs broadcast by Jeepney TV
