= Barbara Perez =

Filipino actress (born 1938)

- Perez in 1962
- Born: Barbara Muñoz Perez III; January 4, 1938 (age 88); Urdaneta, Pangasinan, Commonwealth of the Philippines
- Occupation: Actress
- Years active: 1956–present
- Spouse: Robert Arevalo (m. 1962; died 2023)
- Children: 3

Barbara Muñoz Perez (born January 4, 1938) is a Filipino actress. She began her career in mid-1950s and became one of the leading actresses of the 1960s, noted for her roles in Gumuhong Bantayog (1960), No Man is an Island (1962), Historia de un Amor (1963), Ang Daigdig ng mga Api (1965), Ito ang Pilipino (1966), and Barbaro Cristobal (1968). She was dubbed as the "Audrey Hepburn of the Philippines" in her youth and modelled for couturiers including Ramon Valera and Ben Farrales. Her accolades include two FAMAS Awards and a Metro Manila Film Festival Award.

== Career ==
Perez appeared in more than 75 movies and television shows since 1956. Perez made films included Pagdating ng Takip-Silim (1956), Chabacano (1956), Pampanguena (1956), Gigolo (1956), Ate Barbara (1957), Kalabog En Bosyo (1959) and Tatlong Ilaw sa Dambana (1958).

After she made No Man Is an Island (1962), she was offered a five-year contract by Universal Studios. But she turned it down and decided to marry her boyfriend, Robert Arevalo. She appeared with her real-life husband in Daigdig ng Mga Api (1965) which garnered Best Actor and Best Actress awards for the couple.

She made other films, such as P.S. I Love You (1981) starring Sharon Cuneta and Gabby Concepcion, Blusang Itim (1986) starring Snooky Serna and Richard Gomez, Taray at Teroy (1988) starring Maricel Soriano and Randy Santiago, Ang Babaeng Nawawala sa Sarili (1989) with Dina Bonnevie, and Iisa Pa Lamang (1992) with Dawn Zulueta.

She appeared on television via ABS-CBN's series Budoy (2011) and Kahit Puso'y Masugatan (2012).

In 2018 after almost 5 years on hiatus, she returned to showbiz via GMA Network's series Sherlock Jr.

== Personal life ==
Barbara Muñoz Perez III was born on January 4, 1938, after her grandmother and mother, she is the eldest among the nine children of Antonio Perez from Urdaneta, Pangasinan and Barbara Muñoz of Manila. Her grandfather was a Spanish engineer, who was among the builders of the Manila Hotel.

Perez was a journalism junior at University of Santo Tomas before entering showbiz. She married veteran actor Robert Arevalo in 1962, with whom she has three children, Anna, a director of commercials; Georgina, a full-time hands-on mom; and Christian, a student at Xavier School.

== Filmography ==
=== Film ===
- Pampanguena (1956)
- Pagdating ng Takip Silim (1956)
- Isang Milyong Kasalanan (1957)
- Tatlong Ilaw sa Dambana (1958)
- Ipinagbili Kami ng Aming Tatay (1959)
- Esmeralda (1959)
- 7 Amores (1960)
- Dayukdok (1961)
- No Man Is an Island (1962)
- Ang Daigdig ng Mga Api (1965)
- Dear Kuya Cesar (1968)
- Asedillo (1971)
- Supergirl (1973)
- Ang Boyfriend Kong Baduy (1976)
- P.S. I Love You (1981)
- Exploitation (1983)
- The Sisters (1987)
- Ibulong Mo sa Diyos (1988)
- Taray at Teroy (1988)
- Nakausap Ko ang Birhen (1988) - mother superior
- Bihagin ang Dalagang Ito (1989)
- Bakit Labis Kitang Mahal (1992)
- Ang Boyfriend Kong Gamol (1993)
- Ang Ika-Labing Isang Utos: Mahalin Mo, Asawa Mo (1994)
- Malikmata (2003)
- The Bicycle (2007)

=== Television / Digital Series ===
- Ang Iibigin ay Ikaw (2002)
- Ang Iibigin ay Ikaw Pa Rin (2003)
- Budoy (2011–2012)
- Kahit Puso'y Masugatan (2012–2013)
- Tubig at Langis (2016)

== Awards and nominations ==
Year	Award-giving body	Category	Work	Result
1961	FAMAS Awards	Best Supporting	Gumuhong Bantayog	Nominated
1966	FAMAS Awards	Best Actress	Ang Daigdig ng mga Api	Won
1967	FAMAS Awards	Best Actress	Ito ang Pilipino	Nominated
1969	FAMAS Awards	Best Actress	Barbaro Cristobal	Nominated
