= Fuchsia (film) =

2009 Filipino drama comedy film

- Official movie poster
- Directed by: Joel Lamangan
- Written by: Joel Lamangan; Ricardo Lee
- Screenplay by: Ricardo Lee
- Produced by: Antonio P. Tuviera
- Starring: Gloria Romero; Eddie Garcia; Robert Arevalo
- Cinematography: Carlos S. Montano
- Edited by: Marya Ignacio
- Music by: Von de Guzman
- Distributed by: APT Entertainment
- Release date: August 11, 2009
- Country: Philippines
- Languages: Filipino; English

Fuchsia is a 2009 Filipino drama-comedy film directed by Joel Lamangan. It stars Gloria Romero, Eddie Garcia, and Robert Arevalo.

== Cast ==
- Gloria Romero as Mameng
- Eddie Garcia as Marcelino "Mars"
- Robert Arevalo as Generoso "Gener"
- Armida Siguion-Reyna as Juana
- Celia Rodriguez as Priscilla
- Gina Alajar as Nena
- Iza Calzado as Elizabeth
- Tony Mabesa as Mayor Sunga
- Raquel Villavicencio as Mrs. Sunga
- Richard Quan as Milo
- Jim Pebanco as Poloy
- Nanding Josef as Kandong
- Allan Noble as Mayor Sunga's men
- John Lapid as Mayor Sunga's men
- Ed Tambunting as Mayor Sunga's men
- Dante Javier as Chief of Police
- Nido De Jesus as Policemen
- Noel Elmido as Policemen
- Jojo Lopez as Policemen
- Vic Romano as Policemen
- Josie Tagle as Susan
- Josie Del Rosario as Mameng's relative
- Marivic Mejay as Mameng's relative
- Lourdes Serrano as Mameng's relative
- Cecil Magcamit as Mameng's maid

== Awards and nominations ==
Awards and nominations
Year	Award giving body	Category	Nominated work/ Person	Results
2009	Golden Screen Awards	Best Actress in a Comedy/Musical	Gloria Romero	Won
