= Palibhasa Lalake =

- Updated title card used on Jeepney TV
- Genre: Sitcom
- Written by: Jose Javier Reyes; Ipe Pelino; Divino Reyes; Rhandy Reyes; John-D Lazatin
- Directed by: Johnny Manahan
- Starring: Richard Gomez; Joey Marquez; Miguel Rodriguez; John Estrada; Gloria Romero; Carmina Villarroel; Amy Perez; Cynthia Patag
- Theme music composer: Mike Hanopol
- Opening theme: "Katawan" by Hagibis
- Ending theme: "Katawan" by Hagibis
- Country of origin: Philippines
- Original language: Filipino
- No. of episodes: 609

Production
- Executive producers: Sherida Monteverde; Douglas M. Quijano; Joanna Gomez-Santos; Cynthia de Jesus-Jordan; Emerald Suarez; Linggit Tan-Marasigan
- Running time: 1 hour and 30 minutes
- Production company: Mother Studio

Original release
- Network: ABS-CBN
- Release: March 3, 1987 – November 9, 1998

Palibhasa Lalake (lit. 'Just because you are a man') is a Philippine television sitcom series broadcast by ABS-CBN. Directed by Johnny Manahan, it stars Richard Gomez, Joey Marquez, John Estrada, Miguel Rodriguez, Gloria Romero, Carmina Villarroel, Amy Perez and Cynthia Patag. It aired from March 3, 1987 to November 9, 1998, and was replaced by Sa Sandaling Kailangan Mo Ako.

== History ==
Palibhasa Lalake made the television airwaves on Tuesday March 3, 1987 a day after ABS-CBN relaunching "The Star Network". It aired every Tuesdays from 20:30 to 22:00 (PST). In 1992, the show started to apply closing credits sequence replacing the frozen video picture at every end of the episode as if most entertainment programmes from ABS-CBN started to do that practice. In 1995, the show moved at the earlier 19:00 PhST timeslot. In early 1997, the show moved from Tuesdays to Mondays airing at a later timeslot 21:00 PhST. The show concluded on November 9, 1998.

The original first title card

== Synopsis ==
The show began on March 3, 1987, with the original cast composed of Joey Marquez, Richard Gomez, Miguel Rodriguez, Gloria Romero, Cynthia Patag, and Amy Perez.

They were later joined by Carmina Villarroel (who then played Richard's younger sister, Cathy, a street smart tomboyish kid from the province, and Apa Ongpin (who played the role of a rich Castilian hunky nerd).

Over the years, many characters have come and gone, like Rene Requiestas (as Minerva's genius brother who is never taken seriously), John Estrada (as Johnny, a dumb hunk whose favorite endeavor is to invent things that never succeed). Later additions to the family were Gwapings member, Eric Fructuoso, who was first featured as a suitor of Cathy. Eventually the two other Gwapings members namely Mark Anthony Fernandez and Jomari Yllana were also added to the cast. They played regular teenage rascals always on the lookout for girls. Still later on, another bench brat joined in the fray, Jao Mapa.

Since the show was predominantly male, girls had to join in the fun too. Lindsay Custodio, Rica Peralejo, Jacqui Manzano and Regine Tolentino, then teenagers, were notable early guests. Claudine Barretto and G. Toengi also appeared as a recurring guest stars in early years. In an effort to boost ratings, later seasons saw the addition of character foils, such as Tikboy (Anjo Yllana), a lovable semi-retardate in search of his long-lost mother.

After 11 years of airing, Palibhasa Lalake aired its final episode on November 9, 1998.

== Cast ==
=== Regular ===
- Richard Gomez as Ricardo / Ricky (1987–1998)
- Joey Marquez as Joselito / Joey (1987–1998)
- John Estrada as Juanito / Johnny (1990–1998)
- Miguel Rodriguez as Miguelito / Miggy (1987–1989) (Recurring guest thereafter)
- Anjo Yllana as Eroll, Tikboy (1994–1998)
- Gloria Romero as Tita Minerva Chavez
- Amy Perez as Amelia "Amy" Chavez
- Cynthia Patag as Cynthia Chavez
- Carmina Villarroel as Cathy (1987–1994)
- Apa Ongpin as Raffy
- Edu Manzano as Budoy
- Arlene Muhlach as Arlene

=== The Gwapings ===
- Mark Anthony Fernandez as Mark
- Eric Fructuoso as Eric
- Jomari Yllana as Jomari
- Jao Mapa as Jao

=== The Kutings ===
- Claudine Barretto as Tracey
- Rica Peralejo as Ashley
- G. Toengi as KC
- Regine Tolentino as Regine
- Lindsay Custodio as Sydney

=== Additionals ===
- Menggie Cobarrubias as Luis
- Malou Crisologo as Jessa
- John Lloyd Cruz as Rovic
- Rene Requiestas as Adonis
- Jacqui Manzano as Jacqui
- Antonio Aquitania as Anton
- Bonel Balingit as Hikapre (recurring) (1995–1998)
- Susan Jane Ritter
- Bearwin Meily
- Gabby Eigenmann (1996–1998)
- Kevin Vernal
- Mark Vernal
- Andrea Del Rosario as Seksi
- Kristine Hermosa
- Ogie Diaz as Pekto (1992–1998)
- Bentong
- Empress Schuck as Ruby

== Theme song ==
The theme song of the show is "Katawan", performed by Hagibis (composed by Mike Hanopol).

== Reruns ==
The show's episodes were rerun over at Jeepney TV from October 20, 2014, to November 5, 2021.

The show is streaming on IWantTFC and YouTube.

== See also ==
- List of programs broadcast by ABS-CBN
- List of programs broadcast by Jeepney TV
