= Condemned (1984 film) =

- Official movie poster
- Directed by: Mario O'Hara
- Screenplay by: Mario O'Hara; Jose Javier Reyes; Frank G. Rivera
- Produced by: Nora Villamayor; Peter L. Gan
- Starring: Nora Aunor; Dan Alvaro; Gloria Romero
- Cinematography: Johnny Araojo
- Edited by: Efren Jarlego
- Music by: William Yusi
- Production companies: Golden Dragon Films; NV Productions
- Distributed by: APG Films
- Release date: October 19, 1984
- Running time: 96 minutes
- Country: Philippines
- Language: Filipino

Condemned a 1984 Filipino neo noir crime film directed by Mario O'Hara from a screenplay he co-wrote with Jose Javier Reyes and Frank G. Rivera. Depicting the cruelty of big-city life, with a focus on Manila, the plot centers on the corruption of society and abuses of power. The film stars Nora Aunor, Dan Alvaro, and Gloria Romero.

Produced by Golden Dragon Films and NV Productions, the film was released theatrically on October 19, 1984.

== Plot ==
Yolly, a flower vendor, her brother Efren, a driver and hired gun for a ruthless gangster, and Connie live a bleak existence in the underbelly of the fashionable tourist district of Manila. Escaping from a violent past, the siblings' world collides with Connie's gang.

== Cast ==
- Nora Aunor as Yolly
- Dan Alvaro as Efren
- Gloria Romero as Connie
- Gina Alajar as Mayette
- Rio Locsin as Lorraine
- Ricky Davao as Joey
- Sonny Parsons as Elmo
- Leni Santos as Nona
- Connie Angeles as Cita
- Toby Alejar as Dennis
- Alicia Alonzo as Yolly's Mother
- Romnick Sarmenta as Young Efren

== Critical reception ==
- "Condemned is a rich brew of sudden violence, baroque cruelty, and sardonic dark humor." - Noel Vera, film critic
