= Tanging Yaman =

2000 Philippine film

- DVD cover of the film
- Directed by: Laurice Guillen
- Screenplay by: Shaira Mella Salvador; Moira Lang (Note: Credited as Raymond Lee; Lee became Moira Lang in 2013.); Laurice Guillen
- Story by: Laurice Guillen
- Produced by: Elma S. Medua
- Starring: Gloria Romero; Hilda Koronel; Johnny Delgado; Edu Manzano; Dina Bonnevie; Joel Torre; Cherry Pie Picache; Marvin Agustin; Jericho Rosales
- Cinematography: Lee Meily
- Edited by: George Jarlego
- Music by: Nonong Buencamino
- Production company: Star Cinema
- Distributed by: Star Cinema
- Release date: December 25, 2000
- Running time: 112 minutes
- Country: Philippines
- Languages: Filipino; English
- Box office: ₱167 million

Tanging Yaman (international title: A Change of Heart) is a 2000 Philippine religious drama film directed by Laurice Guillen from a screenplay she co-wrote with Shaira Mella Salvador and Moira Lang, with Guillen as the sole writer of the story concept. The film's title came from a liturgical composition by Manoling Francisco, SJ, and sung by Carol Banawa.

The film stars Gloria Romero as the loving and devout Lola Loleng, with Johnny Delgado, Edu Manzano, and Dina Bonnevie as her children. It also stars Hilda Koronel, Joel Torre, Cherry Pie Picache, Marvin Agustin, Jericho Rosales, CJ Ramos, Shaina Magdayao, John Prats, Carol Banawa, Janette McBride, and Dominic Ochoa.

Produced and distributed by Star Cinema, the film was theatrically released on December 25, 2000, as one of the official entries for the 26th Metro Manila Film Festival, where it won many awards including Best Picture, Best Actor, and Best Actress. The success of this religious-family drama film was followed ten years later by Sa 'yo Lamang, also directed by Laurice Guillen. In 2014, the film was digitally restored and remastered by ABS-CBN Film Restoration and Central Digital Lab.

== Plot ==
The film revolves around the relationship of three siblings separated by both physical and emotional distance: Danny, Art, and Grace, as they reunite to resolve a property dispute.

Danny, a previous tricycle driver and the poorest of the siblings, resides in Pampanga and takes care of their mother, Dolores "Loleng" Rosales, with his wife, Celine, and children, Boyet, Chona, and Carina.

Art visits Loleng and gives her part of his salary, most of which she gives to Danny to settle some of his immediate finances, much to Art's displeasure. Celine comes to Danny's defense, saying he returns what he borrows from Loleng. Art, upon returning to his home in Manila, is shown photos taken by Rommel, who has an interest in photography. He voices his disapproval as he wants him to be a doctor.

In the United States, Grace - who ran away from Pampanga to marry Francis, a mailman - is struggling financially, making just enough to cover the tuition fees of their children, Madeleine and Andrew. The family's financial situation has put a strain not only on the marriage but also on Grace's relationship with her children, especially Madeleine.

A friend of Danny's, a real estate agent, is looking for a large tract of land. Danny initially considers the 80-hectare tract of land left to them by their late father, which Loleng initially objects to, but he was eventually convinced by Danny. Grace, hearing from Danny over the phone about how much they could get for selling the land - enough for her to be able to live comfortably and possibly return to the country - quickly agrees. Art, on the other hand, demands they honor their father's will.

During mass, as Loleng laments over the troubles of her children, she suffers a stroke and is taken to a hospital, where Danny and Art learn that she has Alzheimer's disease. Upon hearing the news, Grace, distraught at the idea of not getting any of the inheritance, pushes for Art to agree with and expedite the sale of the land and divide the earnings among the siblings before Loleng's health worsens. Loleng is later taken to Art's residence, where she'll continue receiving treatment and be taken care of by a dedicated caregiver. Back in Pampanga, Danny and Celine lament how the disease will change Loleng entirely.

Art eventually agrees to the sale, but on the condition that Danny gets the least amount, if any, of the earnings. Meanwhile, Danny, conflicted by their decision to sell the land, suggests to Boyet that he continue studying law in Pampanga instead of Manila. Boyet then reveals that Art has offered him a part-time job. Danny, apprehensive at the idea, tries to warn Boyet of the grudge Art holds against Danny. Boyet lashes out at him while defending Art, saying he doesn't want to be like his father. Celine admonishes Boyet and tells him to apologize to his father. The two eventually reconcile.

Grace, Madeleine, and Andrew then depart for the Philippines, leaving Francis in the U.S. They stay with Art in Manila. Boyet and Chona visit Loleng at Art's house. Loleng, upon hearing Chona sing "Panunumpa", recognizes her and they embrace. However, the discussion about the land sale triggers another one of Loleng's episodes. She demands to be taken home. By this time, she fails to recognize Art, mistaking him for Danny.

Upon arriving in Pampanga to visit Loleng, Grace reunites and reconciles with Danny. She tells her eldest brother that she regrets going behind Danny's back with Art regarding the sale and apologizes. Danny forgives her, saying he doesn't blame his younger siblings, given his history of mismanaging most of the inheritance he got from their father. Grace then jokingly tells Danny that whatever happens, the three of them will still share the inheritance. Danny, after stating that it doesn't feel right to take advantage of their mother's condition, laughs it off. Meanwhile, Madeleine falls in love with one of Boyet's friends, Joel (Dominic Ochoa).

On her 75th birthday, Loleng has another episode and lashes out at Art, who then chastises his mother for always taking Danny's side and Grace for betraying him. He laments about his troubled past - how both their father and mother favored Danny while being very strict and distant towards him, culminating in Art berating everyone and declaring that Danny will receive nothing from the sale of the land. Art is sent backwards by a sudden punch from Danny before driving off with his family.

Loleng later mistakes Madeleine for Grace and gives her wedding dress to Madeleine. Loleng says that she meant to give it to Grace for her wedding with Francis, saying that while she was initially hurt that Grace left them to be with Francis, she knows Grace made the right decision for herself and her own happiness, and knowing that was enough for Loleng. Grace, who was in the room with her mother and daughter the entire time, becomes emotional.

Art later learns that Rommel has not been attending medical school for a month. Rommel tries to reason with his father, exclaiming he can never meet his father's expectations. Art, infuriated, shouts at him to leave the house. Rommel locks the door on Art and breaks down crying. He decides to leave home and go to Pampanga, but on his way, he is caught in a flash flood. Danny, at the scene, calls Art to inform him that while they found Rommel's car, Rommel is missing.

Upon meeting up with Danny, Art laments over what happened: that he is upset at their father, for following whatever their father said despite not loving him, and at God, for giving him nothing but hardships, viewing the current situation (Rommel's accident) as another trial. Danny then explains that their father and God have always loved him and that their father was more strict on him so that Art doesn't end up like Danny. Art then apologizes for his misdeeds and reconciles with Danny. Meanwhile, Rommel is miraculously found and rescued. Danny, Art, and Boyet all return to the Rosales home with Rommel, where they all reunite and rejoice over his rescue. Loleng, seeing her family united anew, smiles and thanks God.

The film ends with the siblings settling their differences, Art contemplating his past actions and valuing his family more, Grace reconciling with Francis, and Danny and Celine dancing and planning where they should go for vacation.

== Cast ==
- Gloria Romero as Lola Loleng: The mother of Danny, Art, and Grace.
- Dina Bonnevie as Grace: The youngest child of Loleng
- Edu Manzano as Art: The second child of Loleng and the family's breadwinner
- Johnny Delgado as Danny: The eldest child of Loleng
- Hilda Koronel as Celine: Danny's wife
- Joel Torre as Francis: Grace's husband
- Cherry Pie Picache as Nanette: Art's wife
- Marvin Agustin as Boyet: Danny and Celine's eldest and only son
- Jericho Rosales as Rommel: Art and Nanette's eldest son, who aspired to be a photographer, instead of being a doctor.
- CJ Ramos as John-John: Art and Nanette's youngest son
- Shaina Magdayao as Carina: Danny and Celine's youngest child and second daughter
- John Prats as Andrew: Grace and Francis' son
- Carol Banawa as Chona: Danny and Celine's second child and first daughter.
- Dominic Ochoa as Joel: Madeleine's love interest
- Janette McBride as Madeleine: Grace and Francis' daughter
- Rolaine Kaye Surposa as Opera
- Felindo Obach as Chief of Police

== Production ==
=== Writing ===
The original screenplay was written solely by actress-director Laurice Guillen, inspired by a priest's reflection on the prodigal son. The screenplay originally revolved around siblings, but Star Cinema decided to make them older and feature the then-young talents from Star Magic as the younger generation. Due to these ideas, Moira Lang and Shaira Mella Salvador co-wrote with Guillen in making the final product.

=== Casting ===
While Laurice Guillen collaborated with veteran actress Gloria Romero on a handful of films, including the former's directorial debut, Kasal? and Kapag Langit ang Humatol, the latter almost turned down the project due to vertigo.

=== Filming ===
The Pampanga scenes were shot in the town of Santa Rita, Pampanga, with the Villa Epifania house as the Rosales family household. The said house was previously used in Lino Brocka's 1974 film Tinimbang Ka Ngunit Kulang, where the director was among the cast.

== Release ==
The film was released on December 25, 2000, as one of the entries for the 2000 Metro Manila Film Festival. The film won nine awards including Best Picture, Best Director for Laurice Guillen, and Best Actress for Gloria Romero. It was later given a re-release on April 4, 2001. In 2006, the Philippine Daily Inquirer included Tanging Yaman on a list of the top 21 movies of the last 21 years, placing at No. 17.

=== Home media and television broadcast ===
The film's restored version became available in iTunes on November 16, 2015, in selected territories including the Philippines, Japan, and Hong Kong.

ABS-CBN premiered the restored version on April 3, 2015, at 9:30PM as part of their Holy Week film presentation for Good Friday. According to Kantar Medita-TNS statistics, the showing attained a nationwide audience rating of 10.2%, lost to GMA Network's showing of 2012 drama film Mga Mumunting Lihim, which attained a 11.6% nationwide rating.

On December 16, 2018, ABS-CBN re-aired the film's restored version as a feature presentation of the network's Sunday late-night block, Sunday's Best. The showing received a 3.4% nationwide household rating, 0.4% greater than GMA Network's SNBO broadcast of the 2011 Chinese film The Guardsman that attained a 3.0% rating.

== Spin-off series ==
Tanging Yaman became a spin-off television series that aired every Saturday on ABS-CBN from June 8 to November 9, 2002, replacing Ang Munting Paraiso and was replaced by Berks. Starring Marvin Agustin and the whole ensemble cast.

== Accolade ==
Year	Award-Giving Body	Category	Recipient	Result
2000	Metro Manila Film Festival	Best Picture	Tanging Yaman	Won
2000	Metro Manila Film Festival	Best Actor	Johnny Delgado	Won
2000	Metro Manila Film Festival	Best Actress	Gloria Romero	Won
2000	Metro Manila Film Festival	Best Director	Laurice Guillen	Won
2000	Metro Manila Film Festival	Best Screenplay	Laurice Guillen, Shaira Mella Salvador, and Raymond Lee	Won
2000	Metro Manila Film Festival	Best Original Story	Laurice Guillen	Won
2000	Metro Manila Film Festival	Best Cinematography	Videlle Meily	Won
2000	Metro Manila Film Festival	Best Musical Score	Nonong Buencamino	Won
2000	Metro Manila Film Festival	Gatpuno Antonio J. Villegas Cultural Awards	Tanging Yaman	Won
2001	Catholic Mass Media Award	Best Film	Tanging Yaman	Won
2001	FAMAS Awards			
2001	FAMAS Awards	Best Picture	Tanging Yaman	Won
2001	FAMAS Awards	Best Actor	Johnny Delgado	Won
2001	FAMAS Awards	Best Actress	Gloria Romero	Won
2001	FAMAS Awards	Best Child Actor	CJ Ramos	Nominated
2001	FAMAS Awards	Best Child Actress	Shaina Magdayao	Won
2001	FAMAS Awards	Best Cinematography	Videlle Maily	Won
2001	FAMAS Awards	Best Director	Laurice Guillen	Won
2001	FAMAS Awards	Best Editing	George Jarlego	Won
2001	FAMAS Awards	Best Musical Score	Nonong Buencamino	Won
2001	FAMAS Awards	Best Story	Laurice Guillen	Won
2001	FAMAS Awards	Best Supporting Actor	Jericho Rosales	Nominated
