= Nestor Torre Jr. =

Filipino writer (1942–2021)

- Born: May 6, 1942
- Died: April 6, 2021 (aged 78); Manila, Philippines

Nestor Urbina Torre Jr. (May 6, 1942 – April 6, 2021) was a Filipino writer, editor, film and television director, scriptwriter, theater actor, and media critic.

== Early life and education ==
Nestor Torre Jr. was born on May 6, 1942 to Capt. Nestor Torre and Isabelita Urbina with the former being a harbor pilot based in Cagayan de Oro. Torre attended Xavier University in Cagayan de Oro for his elementary, high school and collegiate studies. He also studied in the United States, attending the Northwestern University in Illinois where he obtained a master's degree in journalism, radio, and television.

== Career ==
Following his studies in the United States, Torre taught broadcast media at the University of the Philippines. He also became involved in the performing arts becoming a director, scriptwriter and actor for theater acts.

He started his career as director after he was asked by Pete Roa to direct the 1960s talk show Two for the Road which aired in ABS-CBN. Roa was the partner of Boots Anson-Roa who was Torre's mentor as a broadcast media student. The show was hosted by Elvira Manahan and Joey Lardizabal. Following Lardizabal's death, Torre became a co-host of the show he directed. The 1971 film Crush Ko si Sir which starred Hilda Koronel was directed and written by Torre. Torre went on to write screenplays for other films, among which were Khayam and I (1974) and Ang Isinilang Ko Ba'y Kasalanan? (1977).

As a writer, Torre worked as a columnist for Mr. & Ms. magazine from the late 1970s to the 1980s. He also worked as an editor for the publication. On December 27, 1983, Torre was made head of the new 36-member Film Academy Classification Board (FACB) of the Film Academy of the Philippines (FAP), differentiating itself from the Board of Review for Motion Pictures and Television by simply classifying films submitted for review without engaging in censorship. For the Philippine Daily Inquirer, he wrote the long-running "Viewfinder" column and was the editor for its "Saturday Special".

Torre also worked with Filipino composer Ryan Cayabyab. He did work for Cayabyab's first biographical musical Katy (1998) and directed Magsimula Ka where Gines Tan provided the music and Cayabyab lent music-direction. Torre also wrote Cayabyab's musical Magnificat.

He was also a film and television critic, with his critiques at one point being posted at bulletin boards in the offices of ABS-CBN for the actors and production staff to take note of.

== Death ==
Amidst the COVID-19 pandemic, Torre died on April 6, 2021, at age 78 while confined at the Santa Ana Hospital in Manila. The cause of his death was due to complications from COVID-19. Torre also had a bout with a stroke three years prior to his death.
