= 1981 FAMAS Awards =

30th edition of Filipino movie awards

30th FAMAS Awards
- Date: 1981
- Site: Philippines

Highlights
- Best Picture: Aguila
- Most awards: Aguila (4 wins)

The 30th Filipino Academy of Movie Arts and Sciences Awards Night was held in 1981 in the Philippines. The event recognized outstanding achievements of the different films for the year 1980.

== Awards ==
=== Major awards ===
Winners are listed first and highlighted with boldface.

Best Picture	Best Director
**Aguila — Bancom Audiovision**; Brutal — Bancom Audiovision; Kakabakaba Ka Ba? — LVN Pictures; Langis at Tubig — Sining Silangan Production; Pag-ibig Na Walang Dangal — Bancom Audiovision; Taga sa Panahon — Premiere Productions	**Eddie Romero — Aguila**; Marilou Diaz-Abaya — Brutal; Mike De Leon — Kakabakaba Ka Ba?; Danny L. Zialcita — Langis at Tubig; Romy Suzura — Pag-ibig Na Walang Dangal; Augusto Buenaventura — Taga sa Panahon
Best Actor	Best Actress
**Dindo Fernando — Langis at Tubig**; Christopher De Leon — Aguila; Jay Ilagan — Brutal; Joseph Estrada — Hoy, Tukso, Layuan Mo Ako; Christopher de Leon — Taga sa Panahon	**Amy Austria — Brutal**; Nora Aunor — Bona; Vilma Santos — Langis at Tubig; Elizabeth Oropesa — Si Malakas, si Maganda at si Mahinhin; Charo Santos — Pag-ibig Na Walang Dangal
Best Supporting Actor	Best Supporting Actress
**George Estregan — Lumakad Kang Hubad... Sa Mundong Ibabaw**; Jay Ilagan — Aguila; Johnny Delgado — Kakabakaba Ka Ba?; Lito Anzures — Ang Panday; Van de Leon — Taga sa Panahon	**Perla Bautista — Nang Bumuka ang Sampaguita**; Gina Alajar — Brutal; Armida Siguion-Reyna — Pag-ibig Na Walang Dangal; Suzette Ranillo — Taga sa Panahon; Rita Gomez — Tanikala
Best Child Actor	Best Child Actress
**Bentot Jr. — Ang Panday**; Niño Muhlach — Tembong	**Andrea M. Bautista — Dang-Dong**; Sheryl Cruz — Candy
Best in Screenplay	Best Story
**Eddie Romero — Aguila**; Oscar Miranda — Pag-ibig Na Walang Dangal	**Joe Lad Santos — Kaladkarin**; Carlo J. Caparas — Ang Panday
Best Sound	Best Musical Score
**Ramon Reyes — Kakabakaba Ka Ba?**	**George Canseco — Miss X**
Best Cinematography	Best Editing
**Mike de Leon — Aguila**	**Ike Jarlego Jr. — Kakabakaba Ka Ba?**
Best Theme Song	
**George Canseco — Langis at Tubig**
