= Of the Flesh =

1983 drama horror film by Marilou Diaz-Abaya

Karnal
- The poster of the film's restored version, released in 2015 and designed by Justin Besana
- Directed by: Marilou Diaz-Abaya
- Written by: Ricardo Lee
- Based on: To Take a Life by Teresita Añover Rodriguez
- Produced by: Benjamin G. Yalung
- Starring: Charito Solis; Phillip Salvador; Vic Silayan; Joel Torre; Cecille Castillo
- Narrated by: Charito Solis
- Cinematography: Manolo Abaya
- Edited by: Marc Tarnate
- Music by: Ryan Cayabyab
- Production company: Cine Suerte
- Distributed by: Cine Suerte (original); ABS-CBN Film Productions (restored)
- Release date: December 25, 1983
- Running time: 111 minutes
- Country: Philippines
- Languages: Filipino; English

Karnal, internationally titled Of the Flesh, is a 1983 Philippine drama horror film directed by Marilou Diaz-Abaya. It was adapted and written by Ricky Lee from the legal story "To Take a Life" by Teresa Añover Rodriguez and produced by Benjamin G. Yalung. Set in the 1930s, during the American colonial era, it tells the story of a newlywed couple, Narcing (Phillip Salvador) and Puring (Cecille Castillo), who arrive from Manila in the town of Mulawin, a place filled with violent and tragic pasts, a place likened to Hell by its storyteller, played by Charito Solis. Settling in Mulawin, they will witness misfortunes and violence, including rape, incest, parricide, and tyranny perpetrated by the cruel Gusting (Vic Silayan).

It was filmed in the provinces of Nueva Ecija and Rizal and the National Capital Region. Ryan Cayabyab provided the musical score for the film and Manolo Abaya, the director's husband, served as the director of photography. It is the third and last film of Marilou Diaz-Abaya's loose trilogy of feminist films, following Brutal (1980) and Moral (1982). These films depicted the feminist issues and concerns, complete with the use of backdrops and metaphors related to the Martial Law era.

The film was selected as the Philippine entry for the Best Foreign Language Film at the 57th Academy Awards, but was not accepted as a nominee. The film has received its overseas release in the United Kingdom on November 23, 1984, as part of the London Film Festival and in Japan on September 14, 2001, as part of the Special Feature of Marilou Diaz-Abaya at the 2001 Fukuoka International Film Festival along with the other films she had previously directed.

In 2015, the film was digitally restored and remastered in high definition by the ABS-CBN Film Restoration under the leadership of Leonardo P. Katigbak and Central Digital Lab under Rick Hawthorne and Manet Dayrit. The restored version of Karnal was premiered on August 13, 2015, as one of the special features for the 11th Cinemalaya Independent Film Festival.

== Plot ==
A middle-aged woman, acting as the narrator, tells a long but violent and tragic story about her mother's life in a town that is only one step ahead of Hell. She also mentions the townspeople's lives under the rule of a tyrannical, violent landowner.

Newlyweds Narcing and Puring arrive from Manila, the capital, to live in the former's hometown, Mulawin. His father, Gusting, is taken aback by Puring's resemblance to his deceased wife Elena. The resemblance prompts Gusting to cause problems with Narcing and Puring. He makes several advances toward Puring, and his failure motivates Narcing to be more assertive toward Puring. At the same time, he reveals to the villagers his friendship with a deaf man, Gorio. In the violent family conflict that ensues, Narcing kills his father.

While her husband is in jail, Puring gives birth to her child, whom the town's villagers consider demonic. After burying her child in the burning fields, Narcing escapes from prison but is pursued by authorities. As he finds his wife at Gorio's hut, Narcing, along with Puring, escapes to avoid capture by the authorities. Unfortunately for him, Narcing is captured by the authorities. A rope ties his hands, and he repeatedly stumbles and slides to the ground as Puring emotionally cries, watching him suffer. At the jail, the jail warden opens his cell and discovers that Narcing had committed suicide by slitting his throat. The news of his death devastates Puring.

The narrator reveals herself to be the niece of Narcing and Puring. Her mother, Doray, is Narcing's sister. She recounts that Doray fled the family home after her father forced her to marry someone she did not love so that she could be with her true love, Jose. Likewise, she was also a victim of family violence in the past. She narrates further that after the tragedy, Puring returned to Manila to work as a salesperson again. However, according to some accounts, she fared even worse because she ventured into prostitution in the dark areas of the capital. On the other hand, some claim she became a nun to atone for her sins. She ends by saying these rumors will never be confirmed, and her true whereabouts will remain a mystery.

== Cast ==
- Charito Solis as the storyteller
- Phillip Salvador as Narcing Esquivel
- Vic Silayan as Gusting Esquivel
- Cecille Castillo as Purita "Puring" Galvez-Esquivel
- Joel Torre as Goryo
- Grace Amilbangsa as Doray Esquivel
- Crispin Medina as Menardo
- Joonee Gamboa as Pekto
- Rolando Tinio as Bino
- Ella Luansing as Suling
- Vangie Labalan as Rosing
- Gil de Leon as Padre Julian
- Rustica Carpio as Talia

== Production ==
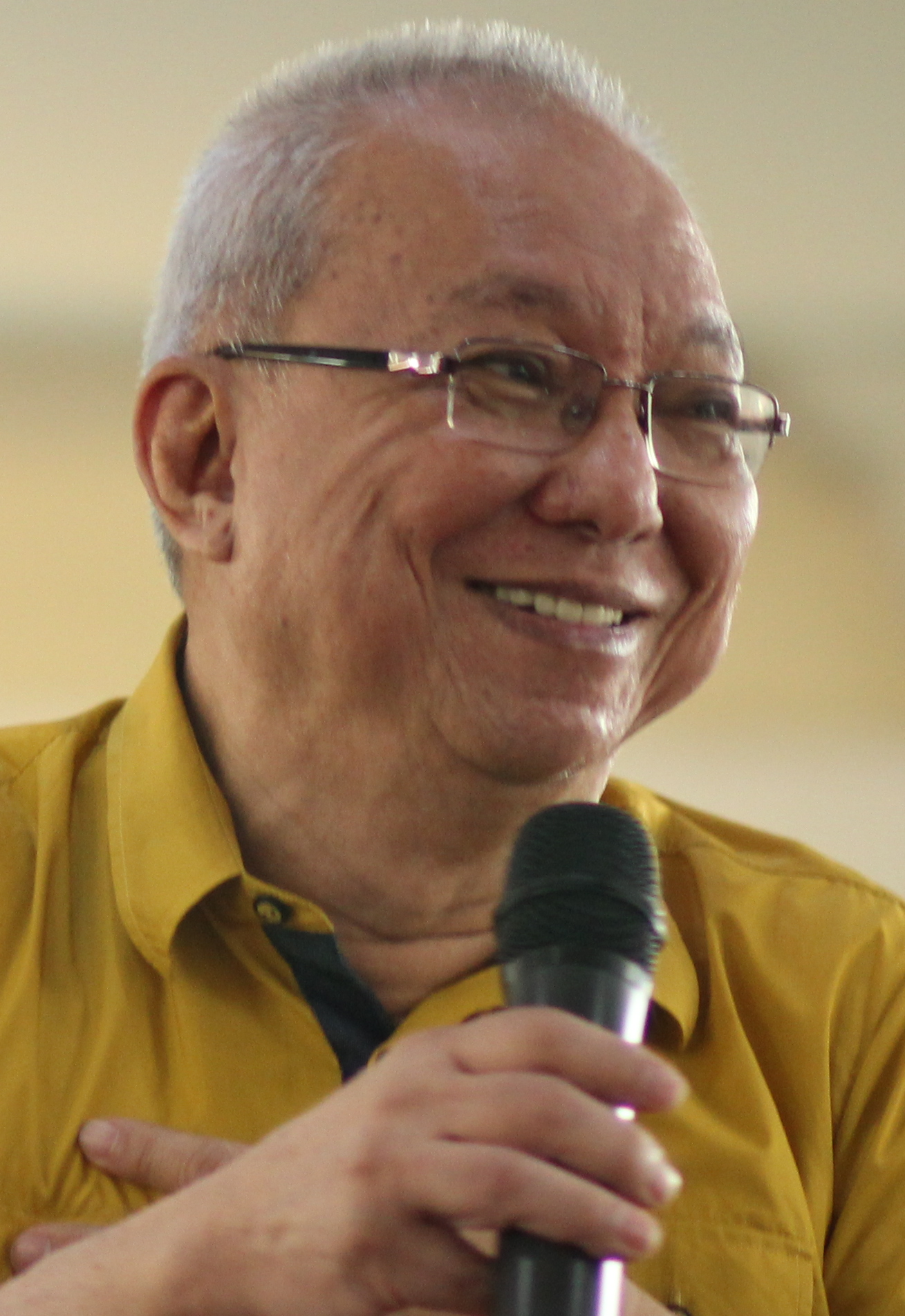
Ricky Lee (pictured in 2018) was called by Diaz-Abaya to create a screenplay based on the magazine article.

=== Pre-production ===
The production of Karnal began when director Marilou Diaz-Abaya received a mysterious telephone call from someone going by the name "M-7", asking her if she agreed to do another film project. Since the caller on the line was mysterious, the publicist informed the director that the caller was none other than film producer Benjamin G. Yalung, and that "M-7" was his alias. Soon after, Marilou Diaz-Abaya, accompanied by her husband Manolo Abaya, met Ben Yalung and his friend, actress Cecille Castillo, who had previously starred in Lino Brocka's Cain at Abel (1982) at a dinner in a restaurant. In the middle of their meeting, the producer handed the director a magazine clipping. The clipping was a legal story by Teresita Añover-Rodriguez, To Take A Life, which was published through Mr. & Ms. Magazine and tells the story of a woman who killed her father-in-law after being abusive to her and raping her. Yalung told Diaz-Abaya that Cecille Castillo had to be one of the starring cast. Because of the story, director Diaz-Abaya was struck by Castillo's period-style looks, believing that she was perfect for the film.

Ricky Lee, the director's screenwriting collaborator in Brutal and Moral, began to create a screenplay after he was informed of Cecille Castillo's perfect period-era looks and used the legal story of Añover-Rodriguez as its basis. The director felt that the story would be set earlier, in the 1930s, when she believed the morals and attitudes of that era were beginning to shift from the old conservatism of the Spanish era toward liberalism due to the influence of American colonial rule.

=== Production design ===
Fiel Zabat, the film's production designer, first studied the old paintings still hanging in the house of Diaz-Abaya's parents to capture the period feel. She also studied the paintings of Fernando Amorsolo and read reference materials on the painter. As a result, the house became one of the filming sites. Several of the old and genuine period-era costumes used for the film were borrowed from Zabat's grandmothers.

=== Casting ===
While watching Peque Gallaga's 1982 war drama film Oro, Plata, Mata, Abaya and Lee were amazed by Joel Torre's performance as Miguel, which prompted them to convince him to be part of the project. Still, they were worried because of his thick points and then, Lee suggested making Goryo a mute man. Torre would later collaborate with Abaya in Ipaglaban Mo!: The Movie in 1995 as the rape victim's husband, Milagros in 1997 as Junie, and José Rizal in 1998 as Crisostomo Ibarra.

=== Filming ===
During the film's production, Marilou Diaz-Abaya and Fiel Zabat began searching towns in Central Luzon that could serve as filming locations. As a result, they chose the town of Gapan in Nueva Ecija and its surrounding towns as the decided shooting site for the film. Luckily for the film's staff and crew, the old stone house the director fell in love with was owned by the production designer's distant aunt, who welcomed the director and the others to use it. The cast and crew took two months to prepare for their roles and duties via workshops and rehearsals, while principal photography took 60 calendar days (two months).

Torre, who prepared for the role of deaf-mute Goryo by doing exercises and bodybuilding, was brought by Abaya and taught how to burn and then gather the charcoal. Abaya told him that the charcoal is "what you breathe. This is where you live. This is what you do. This is your friend. You have no other friends except what your hands do." They shot the scene at the charcoal fields first before they proceeded with the use of shouts and grunts for Goryo.

While filming scenes in the mountains of Minalungao, they put white flags around the set because there were several NPA rebels in the area. However, there were times when they witnessed the process. In the scene where Narcing beheaded his father, prosthetic artist Cecile Baun made the mold of Vic Silayan's head to create a realistic effect in the scene where Phillip Salvador's character decides to kill him.

For the birthing scene, the crew used boiled chicken intestines (soaked in maple syrup) to resemble a real placenta, which Goryo cut with his mouth.

== Restoration ==
The film's restoration was handled by the ABS-CBN Film Restoration and Central Digital Lab in Makati. According to ABS-CBN Film Archives head Leo P. Katigbak, the restoration of Karnal was discontinued when technicians spotted some defects in its acquired copy. Prior to the film's restoration, the majority of its rights are owned by ABS-CBN and they have to acquire the remaining rights to continue the restoration. The film was eventually restored in 2015 using a print generated from the original negatives and it is the first film of Diaz-Abaya to be digitally restored.

The film's restored version was premiered on August 13, 2015, at the Tanghalang Aurelio Tolentino (CCP Little Theatre) of the Cultural Center of the Philippines. The premiere was attended by the film's stars Phillip Salvador, Vangie Labalan, and Cecille Castillo; the director's two sons, musician Marc and cinematographer David Abaya; the film's cinematographer and the director's husband Manolo Abaya, and the writer Ricky Lee. Directors Antoinette Jadaone and Dan Villegas also attended the film's premiere.

=== Television release ===
The film's restored version was premiered on November 5, 2017, as a feature presentation for ABS-CBN's Sunday late-night presentation program, Sunday's Best. The televised showing was rated SPG (Strong Parental Guidance) with warnings of themes, violence, and sex by the MTRCB and attained a nationwide share rating of 0.9%, winning against GMA Network's telecast of Diyos at Bayan, which attained a 0.5% rating, according to AGB Nielsen's Nationwide Urban Television Audience Measurement (NUTAM) ratings.

=== Home media ===
The film was released by Kani Releasing on Blu-ray in 2024, alongside Moral.

== Reception ==
=== Critical reception ===
Jay Cruz, writing for SINEGANG.ph, gave the film four and a half out of five stars, with praise directed to its cast, screenplay, cinematography, music, and editing. He described the film as "a final piece in the trilogy that succeeds in displaying its beauty while showing the cracks on the wall". Panos Kotzathanasis of Asian Movie Pulse wrote that the film "may be a bit overdramatic on occasion but both the comments and the rather intriguing story are exquisite in their conception and implementation, in another great work by the late Abaya".

=== Accolades ===
Year	Group	Category	Nominee	Result
1983	Metro Manila Film Festival	Best Film	Karnal	Won
1983	Metro Manila Film Festival	Best Sound Engineering	Rudy Baldovino	Won
1983	Metro Manila Film Festival	Best Cinematography	Manolo Abaya	Won
1983	Metro Manila Film Festival	Best Art Direction	Fiel Zabat	Won
1984	FAMAS Awards	Best Picture	Karnal	Won
1984	FAMAS Awards	Best Supporting Actor	Vic Silayan	Won
1984	FAMAS Awards	Best Director	Marilou Diaz-Abaya	Won
1984	FAMAS Awards	Best Music	Ryan Cayabyab	Won
1984	FAMAS Awards	Best Actor	Phillip Salvador	Nominated
1984	FAMAS Awards	Best Supporting Actress	Grace Amilbangsa	Nominated
1984	FAP Awards	Best Director	Marilou Diaz-Abaya	Won
1984	FAP Awards	Best Supporting Actress	Charito Solis	Won
1984	FAP Awards	Best Production Design	Fiel Zabat	Won
1984	Gawad Urian Awards	Best Actor	Phillip Salvador	Won
1984	Gawad Urian Awards	Best Director	Marilou Diaz-Abaya	Nominated
1984	Gawad Urian Awards	Best Supporting Actor	Vic Silayan	Won
1984	Gawad Urian Awards	Best Cinematography	Manolo Abaya	Won
1984	Gawad Urian Awards	Best Music	Ryan Cayabyab	Won
1984	Gawad Urian Awards	Best Supporting Actress	Charito Solis	Won
1984	Gawad Urian Awards	Best Production Design	Fiel Zabat	Won
1984	Gawad Urian Awards	Best Picture	Karnal	Nominated
1984	Gawad Urian Awards	Best Supporting Actor	Joel Torre	Nominated
1984	Gawad Urian Awards	Best Actress	Cecille Castillo	Nominated
1984	Gawad Urian Awards	Best Supporting Actress	Grace Amilbangsa	Nominated
1984	Gawad Urian Awards	Best Sound	Rudy Baldovino	Nominated
1984	Gawad Urian Awards	Best Screenplay	Ricky Lee	Nominated
1984	Gawad Urian Awards	Best Editing	Marc Tarnate	Nominated

== See also ==
- Kisapmata
- Brutal (film)
- Moral (1982 film)
