= Elizabeth Oropesa =

Filipino actress

- Born: Jacqueline Elizabeth Oropesa Freeman; July 17, 1954 (age 72); Albay, Philippines
- Other name: La Oropesa
- Occupation: Actress
- Years active: 1970–present
- Children: Henry, Guinevieve, Gabriel, and Louie

Elizabeth Oropesa (born July 17, 1954), also known as La Oropesa, or "Boots" to friends is a Filipino actress. She was a Grand Slam Best Actress winner for Bulaklak Ng Maynila (1999). She was crowned as Miss Luzon of the Miss Republic of the Philippines (RP) 1972. She was one of the Miss White Castle models in the mid-70s. One of her notable roles is Sandra Salgado, the evil stepmother and the main villain in the television drama Esperanza. Aside from her work in the entertainment industry, Oropesa is currently working as a healer.

Oropesa is a Marcos loyalist, having participated in two coup attempts against the Aquino administration in 1986 and 1987.

== Early life ==
Oropesa grew up in Guinobatan, Albay.

== Career ==
In 1974, Oropesa starred in Celso Ad. Castillo's Ang Pinakamagandang Hayop sa Balat ng Lupa (lit. 'The most beautiful animal on the face of the Earth'; 1974), in which she is as a supporting actress to former Miss Universe Gloria Diaz, who was then being launched to stardom. She portrayed the role of Saling, the barrio lass who is madly in love with Simon (Vic Vargas) and loathes the presence of Isabel (Gloria Diaz) on the barrio-island. She and Diaz made a big splash by introducing the "wet look" in Philippine cinema.

Oropesa was launched to stardom in Mister Mo, Lover Boy Ko (1975), produced by Jesse Ejercito and directed by Ishmael Bernal. She won the FAMAS Best Actress award for Lumapit, Lumayo ang Umaga (1975), also directed by Bernal. Again, Bernal directed Oropesa in Nunal sa Tubig (1976), considered one of the best films of the 1970s. Oropesa is one of director Ishmael Bernal's favorite actresses to work with.

Other notable movies she made are Alupihan Dagat (1975) and Aguila (1980) with Fernando Poe Jr.; Si Rafael at Raquel (1976) and Hide and Seek sa Manila, Makati (1977) with Christopher de Leon; Mother and Daughter (1975) with Paraluman and Vic Vargas; Katawang Lupa (1975) with Eddie Gutierrez; Uhaw Na Dagat (1981) with Gloria Diaz and Isabel Rivas; Iking Boxer (1975) with Chiquito; Nueva Vizcaya (1974) with Vic Vargas; Si Malakas, si Maganda at si Mahinhin (1981) with Alma Moreno and Dindo Fernando; and Palabra de Honor (1983) with Eddie Garcia.

After a brief stay in the United States, Oropesa returned to the Philippines in 1985 and attempted to continue her local entertainment career. By then she had already starred in more than 100 films. However, Oropesa would proceed to take a seven-year hiatus from the local film industry after 1986 amidst her participation in coup attempts against the Aquino administration, with her moving to Taipei, Taiwan to focus on being a housewife to actor Meng Fei.

In 1993, Oropesa ended her hiatus when she signed a contract with ABS-CBN to star in a television anthology series.

She received Best Supporting Actress awards for Milagros (1997) and Sa Pusod ng Dagat (1998), both directed by Marilou Diaz-Abaya, and a Best Actress grand slam, five best actress awards for Bulaklak ng Maynila (1999), directed by Joel Lamangan.

She did Mister Mo, Lover Ko (1999) a comedy film again directed by Joel Lamangan, starring Glydel Mercado, Eddie Gutierrez, Gary Estrada and Danny Ramos. In 2003, she made the film Homecoming, an entry in the Metro Manila Film Festival, directed by Gil Portes, with Alessandra de Rossi, playing a mother and daughter caught in a heart-wrenching homecoming. In 2004, Elizabeth played a villain named Belinda Manalo in Te Amo, Maging Sino Ka Man, the character was bitter and hot-headed.

She played the mother of Jennica Garcia and stepmother of Jolina Magdangal in Adik Sa'Yo (2009) with Marvin Agustin, Dennis Trillo and Joey Marquez, directed by Joel Lamangan. She starred in a digital film Ded Na si Lolo (international title: Grandpa Is Dead, 2009), about a family staying together and getting stronger amid personal differences and hardships, starring Roderick Paulate, Gina Alajar and Manilyn Reynes. Oropesa made a comeback as a grandmother in the TV drama, Angelito: Batang Ama which aired from 2011 to 2012 on ABS-CBN. In 2017, she played a role in Impostora in which the character plays is calm and supportive of the main protagonist. In 2018, she was tapped to play the funny arrogant and brainless mother of Amber. Named Violet "Violy" Bolocboc, she is one of the anti-heroines of Pamilya Roces. She and her daughter scheme to become rich, but overall they are anti-heroes.

She has appeared in more than 150 films and television shows since 1973.

== Political involvement ==
Oropesa is a Marcos loyalist. In early 1986, Oropesa campaigned for the reelection of president Ferdinand Marcos in the 1986 snap election.

=== Participation in coup attempts ===
In the aftermath of the People Power Revolution that overthrew the Marcos regime in February 1986, Oropesa was among the active pro-Marcos personalities who took part in coup attempts against the Corazon Aquino administration. Oropesa participated in both the July 1986 siege of the Manila Hotel and the January 1987 takeover of the GMA television station alongside actresses Alona Alegre and Annie Ferrer.

In 1987, Oropesa was charged with rebellion by the Northern Police District for her participation in the January 27 takeover of GMA Network.

== Personal life ==
Oropesa was married three times, including to actors Dante Rivero and Meng Fei, and had several children from various relationships.

== Filmography ==
=== Film ===
Year	Title	Role	Note(s)	Ref(s).
1973	Nueva Vizcaya			
1973	Iking Boxer			
1973	James Wong			
1974	Sarhento Fofonggay: A, Ewan!			
1974	Enter Garote		credited as "Elizabeth Oropeza"	
1974	Ugat		credited as "Elizabeth Oropeza"	
1974	Ang Pinakamagandang Hayop sa Balat ng Lupa	Saling		
1974	The Pacific Connection			
1974	Amor			
1975	Ito'y Isang Baliw Na Baliw Na Daigdig			
1975	Huwag Pamarisan! Mister Mo... Lover Boy Ko!		First lead role	
1975	Alupihang Dagat			
1975	Kapitan Kulas			
1975	Lumapit... Lumayo ang Umaga			
1976	Magsikap: Kayod sa Araw, Kayod sa Gabi			
1976	Nunal sa Tubig	Maria		
1977	Pang-Umaga... Pang-Tanghali... Pang-Gabi...			
1977	Tisoy!	Maria		
1977	Bontoc	Bingbing		
1978	Isang Gabi sa Iyo... Isang Gabi sa Akin			
1979	Vontes V			
1980	Aguila	Lilian T. Garrido		
1980	Si Malakas, si Maganda at si Mahinhin			
1981	Uhaw Na Dagat			
1981	Wanted: Sabas, ang Kilabot			
1981	Dear Heart		"Guest appearance"	
1981	Dugong Mandirigma			
1981	Deadly Commandos			
1981	The Betamax Story			
1981	Init o' Lamig			
1981	Kapitan Kidlat			
1982	Kalog at Kidlat			
1982	Anak ng Tulisan			
1983	Palabra de Honor			
1983	Lumaban Ka, Satanas			
1983	Hula			
1983	Lintik Lang ang Walang Ganti			
1983	Kato: Son of the Dragon			
1986	Kailan Tama ang Mali?			
1986	Future Hunters	Huntress		
1994	Secret Love	Sonia		
1994	The Untold Story: Vizconde Massacre II: May the Lord Be with Us!	Estrellita Vizconde		
1995	Pare Ko	Aida Sto. Domingo		
1995	Campus Girls	Becky		
1995	Ipaglaban Mo: The Movie	Feliza Saldago	segment "Qualified Seduction: Case No. 23450"	
1995	Victim No. 1: Delia Maga (Jesus, Pray For Us!) – A Massacre in Singapore	Flor Contemplacion		
1997	Ilaban Mo... Bayan Ko! The Obet Pagdanganan Story	Fidela		
1997	Mariano Mison... NBI			
1997	Ang Ambisyosa			
1997	Milagros	Miding		
1997	Ako Lang sa Langit			
1997	Evangeline Katorse: Reyna ng Stage Show			
1997	The Sarah Balabagan Story	Sarah's mother		
1997	Bubot	Aling Gloria		
1998	Sa Pusod ng Dagat	Rosa		
1998	Sinaktan Mo ang Puso Ko			
1998	Tatsulok			
1998	Kasal-Kasalan (Sakalan)	Amalia		
1999	Burlesk King	Betty		
1999	Mister Mo, Lover Ko	Melody		
1999	Bulaklak ng Maynila	Azon		
1999	Oo Na, Mahal Na Kung Mahal	Mely		
1999	Esperanza: The Movie	Sandra Salgado		
2000	Senswal			
2001	Balahibong Pusa	Vivian		
2001	Tabi Tabi Po!			
2002	Mama San			
2003	Lastikman	Mrs. Orozco		
2003	A.B. Normal College: Todo Na 'Yan! Kulang Pa 'Yun!	Miguel's mother		
2003	Ang Huling Birhen sa Lupa			
2003	Homecoming			
2004	Lastikman: Unang Banat	Susan		
2005	Baryoke			
2005	Shake, Rattle and Roll 2k5	Sael's wife	segment "Lihim ng San Joaquin"	
2006	Apoy sa Dibdib ng Samar	Aling Mercedes		
2007	Roxxxanne			
2009	Grandpa Is Dead	Dolores		
2014	Maratabat: Pride and Honor	Bai Esperanza		
2014	Kubot: The Aswang Chronicles 2	Veron		
2015	Felix Manalo	Cianang		
2016	Elemento			
2016	Mrs.	Virginia		
2016	I America			
2017	Moonlight Over Baler	Fidela		
2017	Bubog			
2017	Si Chedeng at si Apple	Apple		
2018	Excuse Me Po			
2019	Circa			
2021	Huwag Kang Lalabas	Fides	segment "Kumbento"	
2022	Maid in Malacañang	Lucy		
2023	Martyr or Murderer	Lucy		
2023	Sa Kamay ng Diyos			
2024	Pula	Aling Rosa		
2026	I Fell, It's Fine			
2026	Graduation Day	Aling Nelia		

=== Television ===
Year	Title	Role	Note(s)
1991	The Flying Fox of Snowy Mountain		Taiwanese production
1996–1997	Familia Zaragoza	Dra. Bienvenida Perea-Fuentabella	
1997–1999	Esperanza	Sandra Bermudez-Salgado	
2000–2001	Kiss Muna	Amparo / Ampy	
2001–2003	Sana ay Ikaw na Nga	Doña Victoria Altamonte	
2004	Te Amo, Maging Sino Ka Man	Belinda Manalo	
2006–2007	Mars Ravelo's Captain Barbel	Madame Aurora Salvacion / Lady Amorseko	
2007	Margarita	Jessica Beltran	
2009	Adik Sa 'Yo	Madame Stella Maglipot	
2010–2011	Beauty Queen	Amparo Matias-San Miguel	
2011–2012	Angelito: Batang Ama	Amparo "Pinang" Santos	
2012	Angelito: Ang Bagong Yugto	Amparo "Pinang" Santos	
2014	Obsession	Regina Mendoza	
2015	Flordeliza	Lorena Sanchez-Perez	
2017–2018	Impostora	Magdalena "Denang" Del Prado	
2018	Contessa	Rowena	
2018	Pamilya Roces	Violeta "Violet/Violy" Bolocboc	
2019–2020	The Gift	Charito "Char" Apostol	
2020	Ang Daigdig Ko'y Ikaw	Mayor Etta Almazan	
2021	Ikaw Ay Akin	Adelina Miranda	
2021–2022	Agimat ng Agila	Berta Lagman	
2024	Asawa ng Asawa Ko	Usa	

== Awards and nominations ==
Year	Category	Award	Title	Result
1976	Best Actress	FAMAS Award	Lumapit, Lumayo ang Umaga (1975)	Won
1979	Best Actress	Gawad Urian Award	Isang Gabi sa Iyo... Isang Gabi sa Akin (1978)	Nominated
1981	Best Actress	FAMAS Award	Si Malakas, si Maganda at si Mahinhin (1980)	Nominated
1996	Best Supporting Actress	Gawad Urian Award	Ipaglaban Mo: The Movie (1996)	Nominated
1998	Best Supporting Actress	FAMAS Award	Milagros (1997)	Nominated
1998	Best Supporting Actress	Gawad Urian Award	Milagros (1997)	Won
1999	Best Actress	FAMAS Award	Sa Pusod ng Dagat (1998)	Nominated
1999	Best Actress	Gawad Urian Award	Sa Pusod ng Dagat (1998)	Nominated
1999	Best Actress	Metro Manila Film Festival	Bulaklak ng Maynila (1999)	Won
2000	Best Performance by Male or Female in Leading or Supporting Role	YCC Award	Bulaklak ng Maynila (1999)	Nominated
2000	Actress of the Year	Star Award	Bulaklak ng Maynila (1999)	Won
2000	Best Actress	Gawad Urian Award	Bulaklak ng Maynila (1999)	Won
2000	Best Actress	FAP Award	Bulaklak ng Maynila (1999)	Won
2000	Best Actress	FAMAS Award	Bulaklak ng Maynila (1999)	Won
2000	Best Supporting Actress	Gawad Urian Award	Burlesk King (1999)	Nominated
2001	Best Performance by Male or Female in Leading or Supporting Role	YCC Award	Senswal (2000)	Nominated
2003	Best Supporting Actress	Gawad Urian Award	Laman (2002)	Won
2004	Best Performance by Male or Female in Leading or Supporting Role	YCC Award	Homecoming (2003)	Nominated
2004	Best Actress	Gawad Urian Award	Homecoming (2003)	Nominated
2010	Best Supporting Actress	Gawad PASADO Award	Grandpa Is Dead (2009)	Nominated
2010	Best Performance by an Actress in a Leading Role	Golden Screen Award	Grandpa Is Dead (2009)	Nominated
2016	Best Actress	2nd Sinag Maynila Film Festival Award	Mrs. (2016)	Won
2016	Best Supporting Actress	Cinemalaya 2016	I America (2016)	Won
