= Ikaw ang Pag-ibig =

2011 family drama film by Marilou Diaz-Abaya

- Directed by: Marilou Diaz-Abaya
- Written by: Marilou Diaz-Abaya
- Produced by: Most Rev. Leonardo Z. Legaspi; Msgr. Romulo Vergara
- Starring: Jomari Yllana; Marvin Agustin; Ina Feleo
- Cinematography: David Abaya
- Edited by: Tara Illenberger
- Music by: Nonong Buencamino
- Production companies: Archdiocese of Cáceres; Marilou Diaz-Abaya Film Institute and Arts Center
- Distributed by: Star Cinema
- Release date: September 14, 2011
- Running time: 120 minutes
- Country: Philippines
- Language: Filipino

Ikaw ang Pag-ibig (English: You are the Love) is a 2011 religious family drama film written and directed by Marilou Diaz-Abaya in her final directorial effort before her death a year later. The film stars Jomari Yllana, Marvin Agustin, and Ina Feleo, with the supporting cast include Jaime Fabregas, Nonie Buencamino, and Shamaine Buencamino.

A co-production between the Archdiocese of Cáceres and the Marilou Diaz-Abaya Film Institute and Arts Center, with Star Cinema handling the distribution, the film was theatrically released on September 14, 2011, as part of commemorating the tercentenary of the devotion to Our Lady of Peñafrancia, the patroness of the Bicol Region in the Philippines.

== Plot ==
The family life and the video editing career of Vangie Cruz came to a halt when she was informed of the news that her only brother, Fr. Johnny, who is a newly ordained priest, was diagnosed with acute myeloid leukemia. As his sister, Vangie is called upon to be a donor for Fr. Johnny's bone marrow transplant. Vangie is quite reticent at first. She possesses a severe fear of medical procedures, which she attributes to an unsuccessful attempt at abortion that occurred many years ago and has been troubled by ever since. Dr. Joey Lucas, whom she eventually marries and with whom she has a love child, saves her life. Father Johnny is the center of attention for Vangie's dysfunctional family, and as they try to deal with his illness, they find themselves drawn to Ina and pleading for her help. Father Johnny's miraculous recovery is not so much the answer to their prayers as it is the grace of conversion, love, forgiveness, reconciliation, and hope.

== Cast ==
- Ina Feleo as Evangeline "Vangie" Cruz
- Jomari Yllana as Dr. Joey Lucas
- Marvin Agustin as Fr. Johnny
- Jaime Fabregas
- Nonie Buencamino
- Shamaine Buencamino
- Yogo Singh
- Eddie Garcia

== Production ==
Preparations for the film began in July 2010. The film was helmed by the director of Muro-Ami and Sa Pusod ng Dagat, Marilou Diaz-Abaya. Initially, the film's tentative titles were Peñafrancia and Ina, but these later changed to Ikaw ang Pag-Ibig. Filming started middle of 2010 in Naga City during the 300th anniversary of Our Lady of Peñafrancia. Unitel Productions was supposed to produce this film but when it backed out, the Archdiocese of Caceres in Naga City, Camarines Sur decided to fund the project.

== Reception ==
The film was graded "A" by the Cinema Evaluation Board, and rated PG-13 by the Movie and Television Ratings and Classification Board. It has also been endorsed by the Catholic Bishops Conference of the Philippines, the Association of Catholic Universities and the Manila Archdiocese and Parochial Schools, Association, Inc.
