= G-mik! =

Philippine television drama series

- Title card
- Genre: Teen drama
- Written by: Richard Reynante (headwriter); Ronald M. Alfonso
- Directed by: Laurenti Dyogi; Connie S.A. Macatuno
- Starring: Camille Prats; Stefano Mori; John Prats; Angelica Panganiban; Carlo Aquino; Miko Samson
- Theme music composer: Jimmy Antiporda; Cymbee Antiporda; Ronald M. Alfonso
- Opening theme: "G-mik!" by JCS
- Composer: Lennel Diaz
- Country of origin: Philippines
- Original language: Tagalog
- No. of seasons: 3
- No. of episodes: 149

Production
- Executive producers: Carlo Katigbak; Cory Vidanes; Laurenti Dyogi
- Producer: Mylene S. Quintana
- Editor: Ferdie Panghulan
- Running time: 60–90 minutes
- Production company: ABS-CBN Studios

Original release
- Network: ABS-CBN
- Release: February 13, 1999 – June 15, 2002

Related
- Gimik

G-mik! is a Philippine television drama series broadcast by ABS-CBN. Directed by Laurenti Dyogi, it stars Camille Prats, Stefano Mori, John Prats, Angelica Panganiban, Carlo Aquino, and Janus del Prado. It premiered on February 15, 1999 on the network's Saturday afternoon line up. The show concluded on June 15, 2002, with a total of 149 episodes.

The series is streaming online on YouTube.

== Cast and characters ==
Lead cast

- Camille Prats as Ronalisa "Roni" Salcedo
- Stefano Mori as Benjamin "Borj" Jimenez
- John Prats as Juanito "Yuan" Salcedo
- Angelica Panganiban as Angelica "Jelai" Rivera
- Carlo Aquino as Justin "Jun-Jun" dela Cruz
- Miko Samson as Antonio "Tonsy" Rodriguez

Main cast

- Heart Evangelista as Missy Sandejas
- Danilo Barrios as Sebastian "Basti" Barrios
- Janus Del Prado as Leopoldo "Epoy" Prado
- Angelene Aguilar as Bea Madrigal
- Abigail Cruz as Jane Martinez

Supporting cast

- William Martinez as Charlie Salcedo
- Yayo Aguila as Marite Salcedo
- John Arcilla as Cesar Rivera
- Malou de Guzman as Yaya Medel
- Noel Trinidad as Lolo Miyong
- Marita Zobel as Lola Seling
- Joji Isla as Roger dela Cruz
- Ces Quesada as Elsie dela Cruz
- Miguel de la Rosa as Paquito "Paks" dela Cruz
- Monina Bagatsing as Cherry dela Cruz
- Don Laurel as Jerry
- Angela Velez as Marla
- Lovely Rivero as Emily
- Doods Peralejo as Niko

Recurring cast

- Robert Seña as Tonsy's father
- Teresa Loyzaga as Tonsy's mother
- Melissa Avelino as Mia
- Berting Labra as Mang Carding
- Beverly Salviejo as Tiya Mariana
- Princess Schuck as Sunshine
- Allyzon Lualhati as Nelia
- Michael Roy Jornales as Bryan
- Ching Arellano as high school teacher (G-mik barkada's close teacher)
- Sherilyn Reyes as high school teacher (G-mik barkada's close teacher)
- Laura James as Trisha
- Ray Ventura as Mang Delfin
- Ian Galliguez as high school principal
- Jon Santos as Uncle B.
- Giselle Sanchez as Aling Anne
- Rodney Shattara as Rodney
- Pascal Greco as Francois
- Noel Colet as Ric
- CJ Tolentino as Andrew
- Maegan Miller as Katya
- Onemig Bondoc as Lt. Paolo Mendrez
- Anna Larrucea as Leslie
- Ricci Chan as talent scout

Guest cast

- Kaye Abad as Cassandra "Kakai" Marquez (from Gimik)
- Kristopher Peralta as Teofilo "Toffee" Sanchez (from Gimik)
- John Lloyd Cruz as Junie de Dios (from Gimik)
- Desiree del Valle as Dette Zubiri (from Gimik)
- Gigette Reyes as Christine
- Bella Flores as Lola Rosa
- Bernard Palanca as RJ Sebastian
- Carding Castro as Yaya Medel's brother
- Cris Daluz as old garbage collector
- Empress Schuck as young orphan (went to Tonsy's grandmother's house together with the other orphans for a Christmas party prepared by the G-mik barkada)
- Ernie Zarate as Lolo Sebyong
- Gloria Macapagal Arroyo as Tonsy's grandmother
- Joanna Isidro as Myla Andres
- Mar Garchitorena as Lolo Juancho
- Mo Twister as Jelai's crush
- Ramon Zamora as Mr. Lim
- Ricky Rivero as Mark
- Sarah Christophers as Carolina "Carol" Dionisio
- Audrey Vizcarra as Matet
- Crystal Gayle Valencia as Marga
- Anne Curtis as Apple
- Moses Ipsen as Lito Fred
- Maoui David as Basti's childhood crush
- Denise Laurel as Basti's childhood crush
- Rafael Rosell as ice skating coach
- Christian Vasquez as Yaya Medel's crush
- Bembol Roco as Elsie's crush
- Jenny Miller as herself

== Merchandise ==
ABS-CBN Consumer Products Inc., the licensing and merchandising arm of ABS-CBN Corporation, entered into a licensing agreement with Executive Optical for the exclusive release and distribution of a G-mik eyewear collection. The collection included plastic and metal frames in various designs and colors, with UV400 lenses. The eyewear was distributed through ABS-CBN Studio Stores, direct sales outlets, and Executive Optical branches nationwide.

The G-mik merchandise line was subsequently expanded to include apparel, shoes, scents, socks, accessories, and eyewear. The collection was formally launched through a fashion-concert at SM Megamall, featuring members of the G-mik cast performing and modeling the products. G-mik merchandise was sold through department stores, SM Health and Beauty outlets, Jammin' Gems, and Executive Optical branches nationwide.
