= May Nagmamahal Sa'yo =

1996 drama film by Marilou Diaz-Abaya

- Original theatrical poster
- Directed by: Marilou Diaz-Abaya
- Screenplay by: Ricky Lee; Shaira Mella Salvador
- Produced by: Charo Santos-Concio; Lily Y. Monteverde; Malou N. Santos
- Starring: Lorna Tolentino; Ariel Rivera; Stefano Mori
- Cinematography: Eduardo F. Jacinto
- Edited by: Jesus "Jess" Navarro
- Music by: Nonong Buencamino
- Production company: Star Cinema
- Distributed by: ABS-CBN Film Productions
- Release date: 25 January 1996
- Running time: 121 minutes
- Country: Philippines
- Language: Filipino

May Nagmamahal Sa'yo (English: Someone Loves You), internationally released as Madonna and Child, (Note: Attributed to these references:) is a 1996 Philippine drama film directed by Marilou Diaz-Abaya from a screenplay written by Ricky Lee and Shaira Mella Salvador. Starring Lorna Tolentino, Ariel Rivera, and Stefano Mori in his first lead role, the story follows a woman who returned from working overseas and began to search for her missing son, whom she gave up for adoption at the orphanage years earlier. It also stars Claudine Barretto, Gina Pareño, Renato del Prado, Jaclyn Jose, Tom Taus Jr., Emman Abeleda, Rolando Tinio, Archie Adamos, and Lilia Cuntapay.

Produced and distributed by ABS-CBN Film Productions, the film was theatrically released in the Philippines on 25 January 1996. It was later screened in film festivals and retrospective events worldwide, including in Hong Kong on 27 March 1996, as part of the 20th Hong Kong International Film Festival, in Japan on 15 September 1996, as one of the exhibited Filipino films for the 6th Fukuoka International Film Festival, and in Germany on 26 June 1999, as part of the tribute to the director at the Munich International Film Festival.

== Plot ==
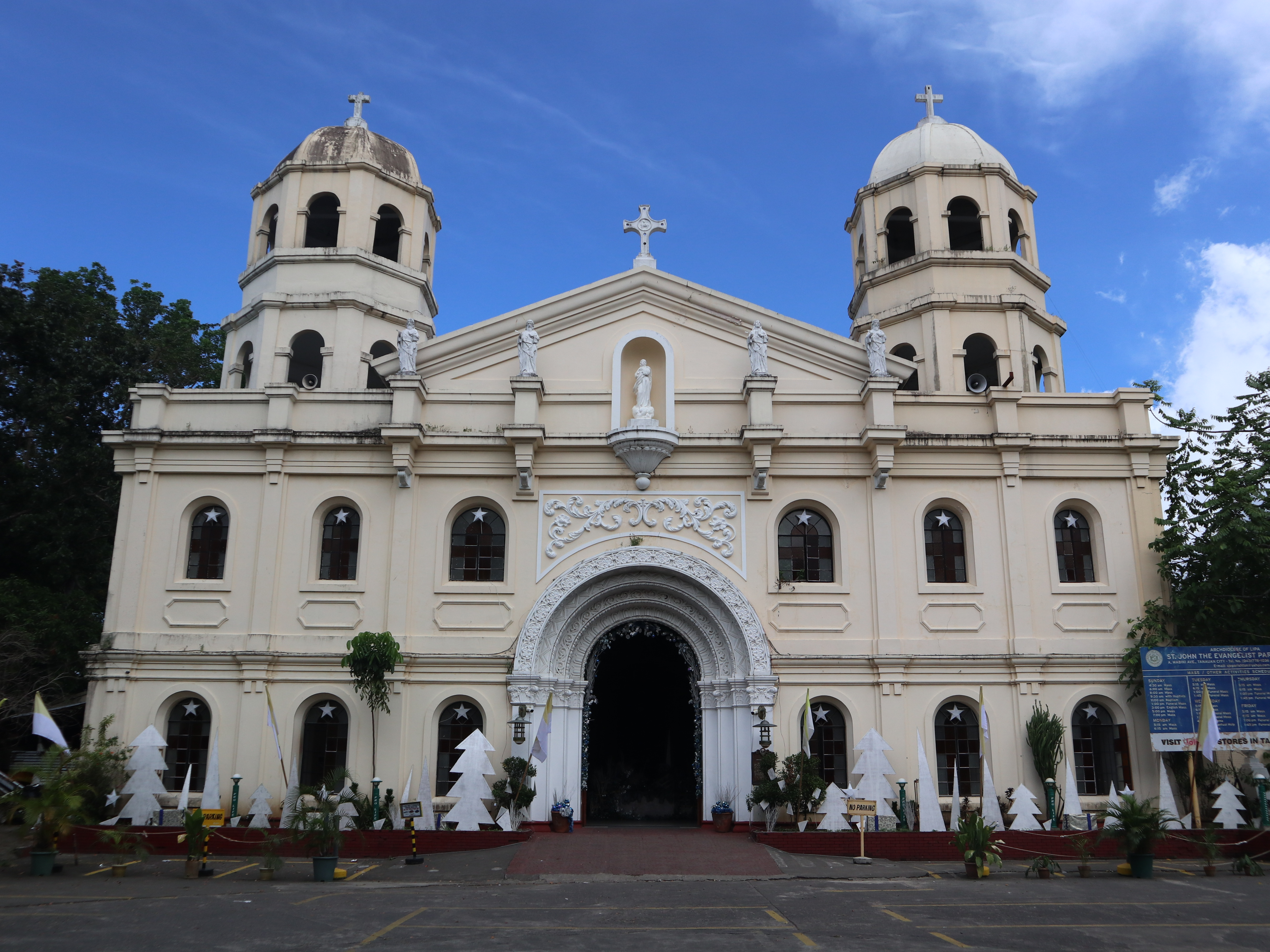
Saint John the Evangelist Parish Church, located in Tanauan, Batangas, was where Louella gave up Leonard.

In 1988, Louella Sevilla, a woman living in the town of Talisay, Batangas, gave up her son Leonard to the care of Father Nicandro at the orphanage to work overseas as a domestic helper. Seven years after she served there in Hong Kong, she returned to her hometown, only to be welcomed by her stepfather Boy and younger half-sister Janine, but ignored by her mother Rosing because she threw Louella out when she found that Louella was pregnant and later was dumped by a traveling businessman. While fetching Janine from school, she reunites with Nestor, the town's policeman. The following day, Louella returns to the same place where she gave Leonard up for adoption, but Father Cortez, the current parish priest, does not know about their current whereabouts or what orphanage they are in now. Manang Ofel, one of Father Nicandro's assistants before his death, tells her that Leonard and the other children were transferred to Hospicio de San Agustin in Pasig.

The search for her son begins when Louella goes to Pasig, only to discover the orphanage has been demolished. Nestor, who later joins her search, tells Louella that the orphans, including Leonard, were transferred to other orphanages, including the two mentioned, based on the information he gathered. In an unnamed orphanage located in Lipa, the two discover that the children in the said facility have disabilities, which Leonard didn't have when he was born. One morning, she received a letter from an employment agency assigning her to work again in Hong Kong. The search continues when they visit Hospicio de San Cristobal in Tagaytay, Cavite, and there, Louella meets a boy named Conrad, who is humming the same melody she had sung for her missing son. Louella and Conrad share a bond like that of a mother and a child. When Louella is about to adopt Conrad, Sister Lourdes says that Conrad is not her biological son. Conrad's biological mother died when he was just 2 years old due to an epidemic caused by the volcanic mudflow. He was discovered by a group of nuns in the streets. He and Louella's son Leonard were among the children transferred from the Hospicio de San Agustin. The two became friends until Leonard was adopted. Louella told Conrad the truth, which made him angry. Nestor began investigating Leonard's whereabouts. He went to Sylvia Alejandro, his adoptive mother, but she said that he was no longer with them. She also told him that her housemaid, Editha, had gone out with Leonard and was living somewhere in Tondo, Manila. He then saw Louella, who was about to return to Hong Kong. He said he would stay in Manila with her if she helped him find Leonard.

In Tondo's informal settlement area, the two met Editha Sungcalan, who cared for Leonard. She told them that Leonard passed away a year ago. She also recalled that Leonard suffered physical abuse at the hands of Sylvia, who treated him like a slave. She would often lock Leonard up and let him starve. Because of this, Editha decides to save him and escape together. Leonard would become a happy and cheerful kid. Nonetheless, he would often run away whenever a visitor came, fearing Sylvia would take him back. One night, he was brought back to her and died due to pneumonia. Louella and Nestor returned to the orphanage to adopt Leonard. Unfortunately, Sister Lourdes told them that they had run away, but one of the kids told them where they were. Conrad went to a group of reef hunters, but the leader didn't want them to see him. They went to him and told him he could be with him, but Conrad said he would go only with his mother. Louella told him that his mother was dead, and Leonard was dead too. She also said that being a parent doesn't run in the blood.

Louella was about to leave for Hong Kong when she heard a harmonica. She saw Conrad, and Louella was now happy to have a son.

== Cast ==
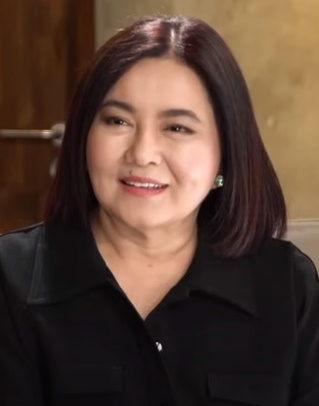
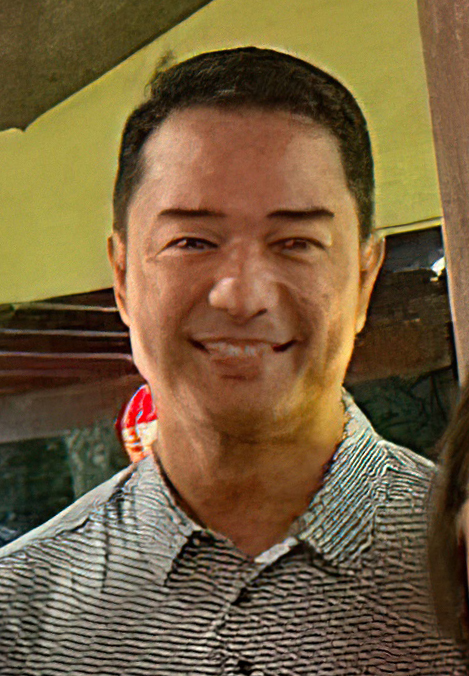
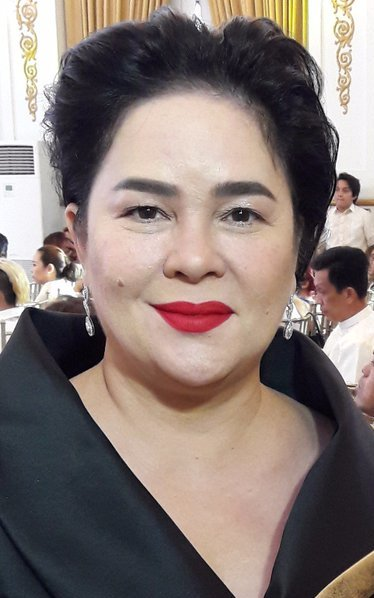
Lorna Tolentino and Ariel Rivera (both pictured in 2023) played Louella and Nestor, respectively. Tolentino previously collaborated with Abaya in Moral (1982) and Kung Ako'y Iiwan Mo (1993). Jaclyn Jose (pictured in 2017) played Editha in her only collaboration with the director.
- Lorna Tolentino as Louella Sevilla: The mother of Leonard, who works as a domestic helper in Hong Kong
- Ariel Rivera as Nestor: A policeman and Louella's suitor
- Stefano Mori as Conrad: A rebellious boy at the orphanage
  - Kaiser German Gonzales as 2-year-old Conrad
  - Robert Norton as 5-year-old Conrad
- Tom Taus Jr. as Leonard Sevilla: Louella's son from a traveling businessman
  - Angelo Lourds Silverio as 8-month-old Leonard
  - Janjiro Hernandez as 2-year-old Leonard
  - Emman Abeleda as 5-year-old Leonard
- Claudine Barretto as Janine: Louella's high school-aged younger half-sister
- Renato del Prado as Boy: Janine's father and Louella's stepfather
- Gina Pareño as Rosing: Louella and Janine's mother
- Rolando Tinio as Father Nicandro: The church's parish priest when Louella gave up Leonard at their orphanage
- Jaclyn Jose as Editha Sungcalan: A woman in Manila who wholeheartedly adopted Leonard after she witnessed her employer abusing him
- Archie Adamos as Father Cortez: The church's current parish priest
- Lilia Cuntapay as Manang Ofel: One of the elderly church volunteers who was Father Nicandro's assistant
- Vangie Labalan as Sister Lourdes: The nun who is the head of Hospicio de San Cristobal
- Cris Daluz as Gusting: A man in the neighborhood whose wife furiously threatened him with a machete
- Mae Ann Adonis as Melencia: Gusting's wife, who threatens her husband with a machete
- Cita Astals as Mrs. Alejandro: Leonard's abusive adoptive mother, and Editha's employer
- Gamaliel Viray as Mr. De Villa
- Alma Lerma as Mrs. De Villa
- Michael Macasio as Dindo
- Romy Romulo as Nestor's fellow policeman
- Jim Pebangco as Foreman
- Ani Pearl Alonzo as Betchay
- Benjamin Valdes as Stephen: The child whom Louella took care of as a domestic helper before his family relocated to Canada
- William Ng and Catbeth Tan as Stephen's parents

== Production ==
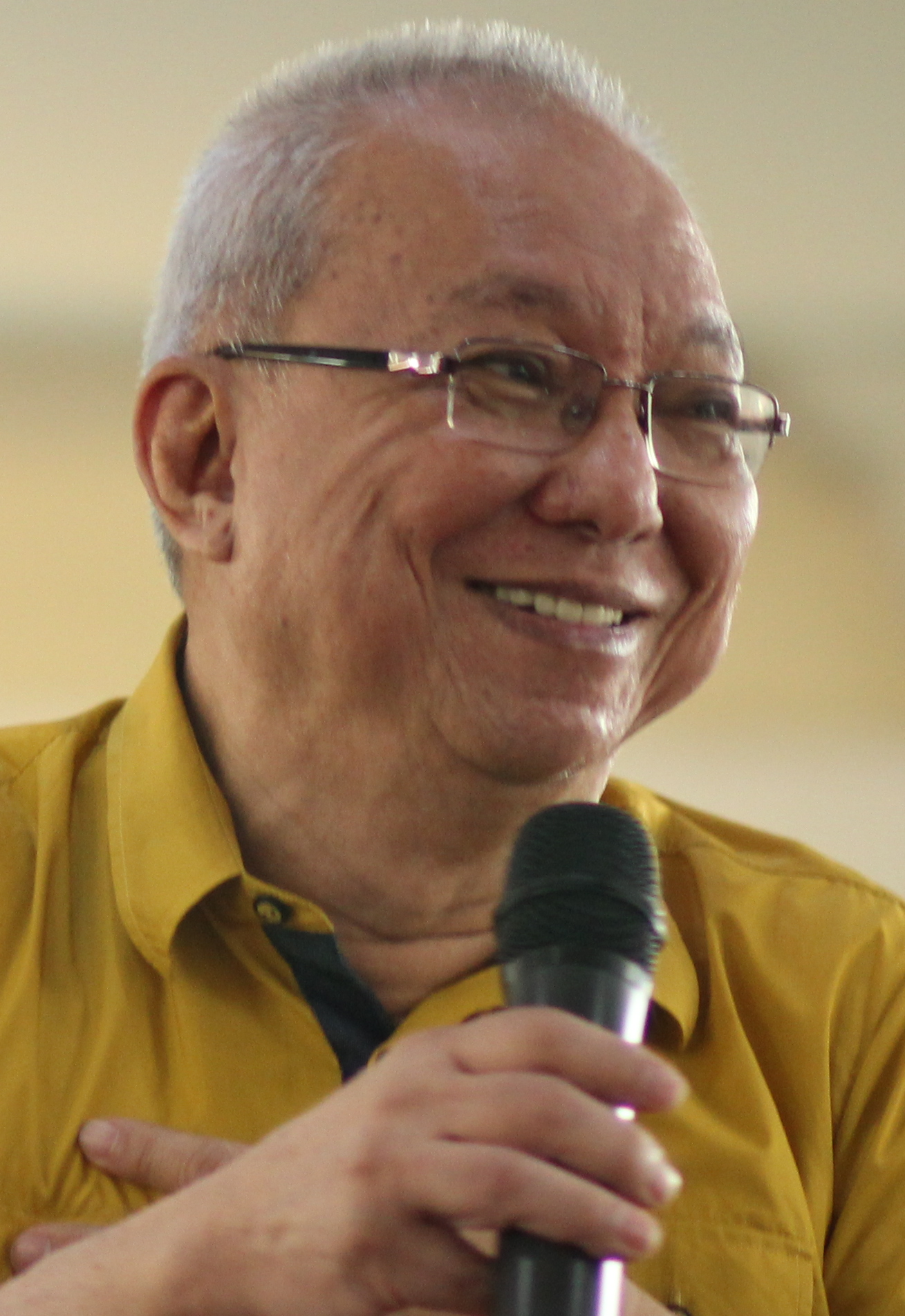
Ricky Lee (pictured in 2018) co-wrote the screenplay with Shaira Mella Salvador.

For director Marilou Diaz-Abaya, May Nagmamahal Sa'yo is the third film she directed for ABS-CBN's film production arm, Star Cinema, following Ang Ika-11 na Utos: Mahalin Mo ang Asawa Mo, which was co-produced with Regal Films, in 1994, and Kapag May Katwiran... Ipaglaban Mo!: The Movie, which became a box-office success, in 1995. Because of the latter's success, Abaya accepted another project offered by the studio and teamed up again with Ricky Lee, her longtime screenwriting collaborator, who co-wrote the screenplay with fellow screenwriter Shaira Mella Salvador. In contrast to her previous films, which depict women who were oppressed and victimized, May Nagmamahal Sa'yo focuses on the life and motherhood of Louella, played by Lorna Tolentino, and addresses the topic of adoption.

According to Lorna Tolentino, she was offered the role of Louella in the project but hesitated to accept because she was moved by the script for the first time, which relates to her being a mother. Ultimately, she accepted the offer because her husband, Rudy Fernandez, was also moved by reading the same material.

== Reception ==
=== Critical reception ===
Noel Vera, writing for The Manila Chronicle in 1996, described the film as "enthralling" and gave praise to all aspects featured throughout the work, particularly the acting performances of the cast including Lorna Tolentino, Jaclyn Jose, Gina Pareño, and Stefano Mori, Ricky Lee and Shaira Mella Salvador's screenplay, and the direction done by Marilou Diaz-Abaya.

=== Accolades ===
Accolades received by May Nagmamahal Sa'yo
| Award | Date of ceremony | Category | Recipient(s) | Result | Ref. |
|---|---|---|---|---|---|
| 45th FAMAS Awards | 2 May 1997 | Best Picture | May Nagmamahal Sa'yo | Nominated | |
| 45th FAMAS Awards | 2 May 1997 | Best Director | Marilou Diaz-Abaya | Nominated | |
| 45th FAMAS Awards | 2 May 1997 | Best Child Actor | Stefano Mori | Nominated | |
