= Brutal (film) =

Out of Order
- Release movie poster
- Directed by: Marilou Diaz-Abaya
- Written by: Ricky Lee
- Produced by: Jesse Ejercito
- Starring: Amy Austria; Gina Alajar; Charo Santos; Jay Ilagan
- Cinematography: Manolo R. Abaya
- Edited by: Manolo R. Abaya; Marc Tarnate
- Music by: George Canseco
- Production company: Bancom Audiovision
- Distributed by: Bancom Audiovision
- Release date: December 25, 1980
- Country: Philippines
- Language: Filipino

Brutal is a 1980 Filipino drama film directed by Marilou Diaz-Abaya from a story and screenplay written by Ricky Lee.

It was the first major Filipino film to tackle rape as a feminist issue. Brutal was followed by Moral (1982) and Karnal (1983), a loose trilogy of feminist films directed by Marilou Diaz-Abaya and written by Ricky Lee.

== Synopsis ==
Housewife Monica Real is arrested for killing three men, including her husband, Tato. Clara Valdez is a journalist searching for the truth about why Monica was driven to kill them and remain silent by refusing to speak to her family and her lawyer. With the help of her boyfriend, Jake, Clara seeks information from Monica's best friend, Cynthia, and Monica's mother to find answers.

== Cast ==
- Amy Austria as Monica Real, an 18-year-old woman who murdered her husband and his three friends
- Gina Alajar as Cynthia, Monica's best friend
- Charo Santos as Clara Valdez, a journalist who is interested in knowing the truth about the murder case
- Jay Ilagan as Tato, Monica's husband
- Perla Bautista as Aling Charing, Monica's mother
- Joonee Gamboa as Defense Attorney
- Johnny Delgado as Jake
- Nello Nayo as Mang Juaning, Monica's father
- Roberto Tongco as Choreographer
- Boy Sabiniano as Eric
- Ogie Martinez as Ogie
- Jun Villena as Jimmy

== Production ==
After the success of her directorial debut Tanikala (1980), Marilou Diaz-Abaya was approached by producer Jesse Ejercito to direct a film for him starring Amy Austria, who had recently distinguished herself in the 1979 Lina Brocka film Jaguar.

== Reception ==
=== Accolades ===
Year	Award	Category	Nominee(s)	Result
1980	Metro Manila Film Festival	Best Film	Brutal	Nominated
1980	Metro Manila Film Festival	Best Director	Marilou Diaz-Abaya	Won
1980	Metro Manila Film Festival	Best Actress	Amy Austria	Won
1981	FAMAS Awards	Best Picture	Brutal	Nominated
1981	FAMAS Awards	Best Director	Marilou Diaz-Abaya	Nominated
1981	FAMAS Awards	Best Actor	Jay Ilagan	Nominated
1981	FAMAS Awards	Best Actress	Amy Austria	Won
1981	FAMAS Awards	Best Supporting Actress	Gina Alajar	Nominated
1981	Gawad Urian Awards	Best Picture (Pinakamahusay na Pelikula)	Brutal	Nominated
1981	Gawad Urian Awards	Best Direction (Pinakamahusay na Direksyon)	Marilou Diaz-Abaya	Nominated
1981	Gawad Urian Awards	Best Actor (Pinakamahusay na Pangunahing Aktor)	Johnny Delgado	Nominated
1981	Gawad Urian Awards	Best Actress (Pinakamahusay na Pangunahing Aktres)	Amy Austria	Nominated
1981	Gawad Urian Awards	Best Actress (Pinakamahusay na Pangunahing Aktres)	Gina Alajar	Won
1981	Gawad Urian Awards	Best Supporting Actor (Pinakamahusay na Pangalawang Aktor)	Johnny Delgado	Nominated
1981	Gawad Urian Awards	Best Screenplay (Pinakamahusay na Dulang Pampelikula)	Ricky Lee	Nominated
1981	Gawad Urian Awards	Best Editing (Pinakamahusay na Editing)	Manalo Abaya, Marc Tanarte	Nominated
1981	Gawad Urian Awards	Best Sound (Pinakamahusay na Tunog)	Amang Sanchez, Rolly Ruta	Nominated
