= Ang Leon, ang Tigre at ang Alamid =

Philippine action film

- Directed by: Cesar Gallardo
- Screenplay by: Tony Mortel
- Story by: Tony Mortel
- Starring: Rudy Fernandez; Bembol Roco; Lito Lapid
- Cinematography: Val Dauz
- Edited by: Rogelio Salvador
- Music by: Rey Lapid
- Production company: Regal Films
- Distributed by: Regal Films
- Release date: November 2, 1979
- Running time: 115 minutes
- Country: Philippines
- Languages: Filipino; English

Ang Leon, ang Tigre at ang Alamid (transl. The Lion, the Tiger and the Civet) is a 1979 Philippine action film directed by Cesar Gallardo. The film stars Rudy Fernandez, Bembol Roco and Lito Lapid as their respective title roles.

The film is streaming online on YouTube.

== Cast ==
- Rudy Fernandez
- Bembol Roco
- Lito Lapid
- Tina Monasterio
- Gina Alajar
- Josephine Manuel
- Paquito Diaz
- Johnny Wilson
