= Aguila (film) =

1980 historical drama film by Eddie Romero

- Theatrical poster
- Directed by: Eddie Romero
- Screenplay by: Eddie Romero
- Story by: Eddie Romero
- Produced by: Eddie Romero; Rolando S. Atienza; Rafael M. Fabie
- Starring: Fernando Poe Jr.
- Narrated by: Charo Santos
- Cinematography: Mike de Leon; Rody Lacap
- Edited by: Ben Samson
- Music by: Ryan Cayabyab
- Production company: Bancom Audiovision
- Distributed by: Bancom Audiovision; ABS-CBN Films (restored version); FPJ Productions (restored version); Cinema One Originals (restored version); Film Development Council of the Philippines (restored version)
- Release date: February 14, 1980
- Running time: 210 minutes
- Country: Philippines
- Language: Filipino
- Budget: ₱5,000,000.00

Aguila (transl. Eagle) is a 1980 Philippine period drama film written, produced, and directed by Eddie Romero. Touted as "the biggest event in local movie history" and "the biggest Filipino film ever made", it features an ensemble cast topbilled by Fernando Poe Jr.

== Synopsis ==
Flashbacks encompass the history of the Philippines as well as the life story of the elderly Daniel Águila. The Águila family gathers to celebrate Daniel's 88th birthday, but the old man is nowhere to be seen - he has been missing for a decade. Suspecting that his father is in Mindanao, one of his sons takes off for that region in a determined search. Along the way, his memories of the nation and his father's life tell the story of eighty tumultuous years of personal and historical development.

== Plot ==
In 1980, at the family residence in Manila, the influential and affluent Águila family celebrate the 88th birthday of their missing and long-presumed dead patriarch, Daniel Águila. His son, Mari, receives news from his half-brother Osman that Daniel is alive in the provinces. Mari, a business tycoon and former Senator, combs the countryside in search of his father, journeying to Mindanao and Bohol. In the course of his search, the Águila family history is unraveled.

It begins in 1898 when Daniel's father, Artemio, an officer in the Revolutionary Army, dies by treachery. His mother, Isabel Teodoro, is raped by that same traitor, Simeon Garrido, and later marries him for convenience. As a young soldier accompanying Simeon to Mindanao in 1918, Daniel again becomes witness to injustice: Simeon and some Americans ruthlessly take away Muslim tribal lands.

Daniel's life is one of complexity - of human emotions and relationships. His affair with a Muslim tribal princess, Farida, results in a love-child, Osman. In 1924, after winning a court case against a radical street preacher, he adopts Osman and marries a lawyer named Sally, Mari's mother. In 1936, Daniel discovers the incestuous liaison between his stepfather Simeon, who wants him to retire from the army and take over the family businesses, and half-sister Lilian, who in turn unsuccessfully attempts to seduce him before succeeding with Osman.

Daniel's experiences fighting the Japanese occupiers in Nueva Ecija during World War II and running a factory under the American-controlled post-war government increase his mounting disenchantment with life and society. Mari's amoral political ambitions, Osman's Korean War wounds, Daniel’s affair with a young fellow WWII militant, Sally's death from illness in 1955, and his grandson Raul's activist stance drive him further into disillusionment. Finally, in 1965, Daniel heeds his longing for peace and leaves.

Mari's journey ends when he finds Daniel in an Aeta village in Bohol, where Daniel has found serenity, far from the maddening machinations and injustices committed by a civilized society.

== Cast ==
- Fernando Poe Jr. as Gen. Daniel T. Águila
  - Ricky Rivero as young Daniel Águila
- Amalia Fuentes as Isabel Teodoro
- Christopher de Leon as Sen. Mari L. Águila
- Elizabeth Oropesa as Lilian T. Garrido
- Jay Ilagan as Osman Águila
- Charo Santos as Atty. Monica Salvación "Sally" Llamas de Águila
- Chanda Romero as Diwata
- Daria Ramírez as Elvira
- Eddie Garcia as Don Simeon Garrido
- Celia Rodriguez as Margo Cepeda
- Orestes Ojeda as Victor "Vic" L. Águila
- Susan Valdez as Bessie Águila
- Johnny Delgado as Ibrāhīm
- Andrea Andolong as Farida
- Conrad Poe as Karim Águila
- Yvette Christine as Lucy L. Águila-Noriega
- Dave Brodett as Capt. Artemio Águila
- Ruben Rustia as Gen. Caram
- Lito Anzures as Datu Khalid
- Ricky Sandico as Raúl Águila
- Joonee Gamboa as Arcadio "Cadio" Cuevas
- Roderick Paulate as Quintin
- Behn Cervantes as Basilio
- Odette Khan as Binay
- Ariel Muhlach as Danielito Águila
- Rolando Tinio
- R. V. Romero
- Henry Salcedo
- Tom Madden
- Richard Lorentz
- Annie Ferrer
- George Weber
- Maria Luisa Gabaldon
- P. V. Gabaldon
- George Albert Romero
- Dhemy Cardenas
- Serafin Payawal
- Archie Lacson
- Grace Poe
- Malou de Guzman
- The Penthouse 7 Dancers

== Production ==
The film had a budget of ₱5,000,000.00 and boasted 12 stars, 60 production staff and crewmen, and 7,000 extras.

The film was shot in 120 different locations. The film's art director, Mel Chionglo, built a Magdiwang camp and an Ilongot village on the hills of Tanay and an Aeta village in Los Baños. Chionglo had three assistants, two set men, and ten carpenters to help in this work. Chionglo also designed sets for an 1897 evening in Binondo, a Muslim waterfront in 1918 (Nasugbu, Batangas), a courthouse in 1924 (Magdalena, Laguna), a Roaring Twenties cabaret in Makati, a Japanese garrison in Lumban, Laguna, and other settings.

The film took 100 days to shoot the 204 pages of script written for it, the latter having been written over two years.

Actress Rio Locsin was originally cast to play Huk commander Diwata but was replaced by Chanda Romero, director Eddie Romero's niece, when she failed to show up on her first shooting day.

The production was infamously marred by tensions between the crew. Among the reported incidents of tensions flaring up involved Eddie Romero's frequent butting of heads with Mel Chionglo. Romero likewise clashed with set decorator, and now screenwriter, Racquel Villavicencio over unreasonable production demands. Eventually, the differences among the crew members got so unbearable for the film's cinematographer, Mike de Leon, that he walked out on the project altogether. However, while tensions were building between members of the crew, no such tensions were reported among the actors and Romero himself. Romero was described as being a "cool director", not having been angered by the actors on the set. The lone exception of Romero being angered by an actor on the set is when he threatened to renounce his niece, Chanda, if she could not do her kissing scene with Christopher de Leon right.

Romero was notoriously late on the set, but the actors would arrive even later than Romero himself. Despite this, however, Romero tolerated the different personalities between the actors and allowed them to bond, usually over meals in between shoots.

Upon the release of the film, a minor criticism launched at it was that the actors who are supposed to age do not look like they have aged a day. Most notably, Amalia Fuentes refused to show age in the film despite portraying the mother of FPJ's character, Daniel.

FPJ choreographed the fight and war scenes.

FPJ's daughter, future Senator, Grace Poe cameoed in the film as Daria Ramirez's sister.

In addition, Bancom Audiovision also spent ₱100,000.00 for an hour-long made for television documentary film on the making of Águila and hired producer Jesse M. Ejército as advertising and marketing consultant.

This is the second of Eddie Romero's epic historical film trilogy, wedged in between "Ganito Kami Noon, Paano Kayo Ngayon?" and "Kamakalawa".

== Music ==
The film's entire music was written by Ryan Cayabyab. Cayabyab also sang the American singer's part during the 1924 cabaret scene.

The film's theme song "Iduyan Mo" was composed by Cayabyab specifically for the film. The song was interpreted by Basil Valdez.

== Themes ==
There are three themes prevalent throughout the film - Family, History and Society and Nationalism

=== Family ===
Film director and scribe Nick Deocampo points out that the film may be examined to better appreciate the value of the family as a basic institution of the society. The family as a basic institution of the society was enshrined in §4, Art. II of the 1973 Constitution, the law in force at the time of the film's release, which not only recognizes the family as such but also endeavors to protect and strengthen the same. The same provision was carried over to the 1987 Constitution where an entire section is devoted to the family.

In the film, family life in the Philippines is examined through historical lenses as it depicts the evolution of the Filipino family throughout history and how its values are formed and/or changed.

The family is likewise peered into through the eyes of Daniel Águila as he has lived through an ever evolving and ever growing family - first having grown fatherless and then having a difficult relationship with his mother, Isabel, because of her decision to remarry a man Daniel detests, a choice which was itself imposed upon Isabel by her own parents; then as a family man himself, how Daniel copes with his own children who has views opposite to his and whose views shape the paths they chose to take in life.

The film likewise explores alienation within one's own family, as seen in the experiences of Daniel, Osman, Mari and Lilian who all feel like they are outsiders within their own family at certain points in the film.

Another point the film touches upon is how the family shapes its members, specifically how familial experience molded Daniel Águila as a person. This film has been cited as an unconventional FPJ-movie as it shows FPJ as Daniel Águila being vulnerable, a departure from the typical roles that show Poe as an infallible and incorruptible conquering hero. In the film, Daniel's failings as a man and as head of the family is shown and it examines how these define Daniel as a person and how it influenced the Águila family.

=== History and Society ===
Being under the genre of historical drama, the film depicts how values, not only in the family but in the larger Philippine society, evolves. It shows how Daniel and his family and the values they hold are a product of their times, how their choices are informed by the prevailing values and trends of a given period. This is exemplified in the character arc of Mari, who, in entering the political arena becomes swept by its corruption and inevitably becomes part of the machinery that he once sought to change. This is likewise shown in the arc of Raul, who is driven to suicide because of the realization that his hero and mentor, Margo, was willing to give up their cause for personal reasons, much like Cadio and Basilio before her.

Alienation again takes the spotlight as Daniel is driven into abandoning his family and choosing to live in both Cotabato and Bohol to escape a society that has become more and more unfamiliar to him. In both communities, he helps its residents and teaches them self-reliance.

=== Nationalism ===
As with Ganito Kami Noon, Paano Kayo Ngayon? the film examines what the social ills the pervades Philippine society and how said problems merely evolve but are never solved.

This pervasive problem is exemplified by the character of Simeon Garrido, who was willing to sell his loyalty insofar as the new colonial masters are willing serve his personal interests. Much later in the film, Mari's entry into politics leads him to "do as the Romans do" and engage in corruption to the detriment of the Filipino people. Similarly, the character arc of Margo shows how those claiming to fight for nationalism can be corrupted when personal interests is thrown into the picture.

Throughout the film, nationalism is a constant frustration for Daniel who has seen how Filipinos are pitted by the Philippines' colonizers against each other; how those who fought for the independence of the Philippines are instead treated like criminals and how those who collaborated with the enemies are given preferred positions. Daniel, in 1945, even laments if his service in the war ultimately redounded to the benefit of but a few, instead of that of the Filipino people.

== Release ==
The film was released on February 14, 1980, and was simultaneously played at 25 theatres across Metro Manila. Prior to the film's Valentine's Day debut, it was previewed thrice and had three premieres.

=== Re-releases ===
Years after Aguila's initial theatre run, film festival organizers' have shown their appreciation of this Eddie Romero film by re-running it for the benefit of younger audiences.

Among the subsequent screenings that the film has had was at the 9th Cínemalayà Cinesthesia in 2013.

In 2019, ABS-CBN Film Restoration Project and FPJ Productions digitally restored the film which required 3,000 hours of digital preservation. Subsequently, the digitally restored film has been screened at the UP Film Center as part of the UP Film Institute's commemoration of FPJ's 80th birthday. In the same year, the digitally restored version was screened at the 15th C1 Originals. In 2024, FDCP screened its period drama version during the PFIM on September 1 at the Manila Metropolitan Theater.

== Awards and nominations ==
Year	Award-Giving Body	Category	Recipient	Result
1981
1981	29th FAMAS Awards			
1981	29th FAMAS Awards	Best Picture	Aguila	Won
1981	29th FAMAS Awards	Best Director	Eddie Romero	Won
1981	29th FAMAS Awards	Best Screenplay	Eddie Romero	Won
1981	29th FAMAS Awards	Best Cinematography	Mike de Leon	Won
1981	29th FAMAS Awards	Best Actor	Christopher de Leon	Nominated
1981	29th FAMAS Awards	Best Supporting Actor	Jay Ilagan	Nominated
1981	5th Gawad Urian Awards			
1981	5th Gawad Urian Awards	Best Supporting Actress (Pinakamahusay na Pangalawang Aktres)	Daria Ramirez	Won
1981	5th Gawad Urian Awards	Best Picture (Pinakamahusay na Pelikula)	Aguila	Nominated
1981	5th Gawad Urian Awards	Best Direction (Pinakamahusay na Direksyon)	Eddie Romero	Nominated
1981	5th Gawad Urian Awards	Best Screenplay (Pinakamahusay na Dulang Pampelikula)	Eddie Romero	Nominated
1981	5th Gawad Urian Awards	Best Supporting Actor (Pinakamahusay na Pangalawang Aktor)	Jay Ilagan	Nominated
1981	5th Gawad Urian Awards	Best Supporting Actor (Pinakamahusay na Pangalawang Aktor)	Joonee Gamboa	Nominated
1981	5th Gawad Urian Awards	Best Cinematography (Pinakamahusay na Sinematograpiya)	Mike de Leon and Rody Lacap	Nominated
1981	5th Gawad Urian Awards	Best Editing (Pinakamahusay na Editing)	Ben Barcelon	Nominated
1981	5th Gawad Urian Awards	Best Music (Pinakamahusay na Musika)	Ryan Cayabyab	Nominated

== See also ==
- The Ravagers (film)
- The Walls of Hell
- Manila, Open City
- Santiago! (film)
- Ganito Kami Noon, Paano Kayo Ngayon?
- Kamakalawa
