= Marilou Diaz-Abaya =

Filipina film director and writer (1955–2012)

- Born: Marilou Correa Diaz; March 30, 1955; Quezon City, Philippines
- Died: October 8, 2012 (aged 57); Taguig, Philippines
- Resting place: Loyola Memorial Park, Marikina, Philippines (2012–2023); Libingan ng mga Bayani, Taguig, Philippines (2023–present)
- Education: Assumption College (BA); Loyola Marymount University (MA); London International Film School
- Occupations: Director, writer
- Years active: 1980–2012
- Spouse: Manolo Abaya
- Children: Marc Abaya; David Abaya
- Awards: Order of National Artists of the Philippines

Marilou Correa Diaz-Abaya (née Diaz; March 30, 1955 – October 8, 2012) was a Filipina film director. She was posthumously conferred the Order of National Artists of the Philippines for Film and Broadcast Arts in 2022, she was the founder and president of the Marilou Diaz-Abaya Film Institute and Arts Center, a film school based in Antipolo. She was the director of the 1998 film José Rizal, a biographical film on the Philippines' national hero of the same name. She was part of the Second Golden Age of Philippine Cinema.

== Early life ==
Diaz was born in Quezon City in 1955. She was one of seven children of lawyers Conrado Diaz and Felicitas Correa Diaz. She grew up quite privileged. Her father is from Paoay, Ilocos Norte, and is related to Valentín Díaz, who was one of the founding signatories in 1892 of the nationalist association La Liga Filipina with José Rizal, whom her famous film was about.

Diaz and her siblings grew up in a house filled with art that was instituted by their parents who were art collectors. On the walls of their house hung several painting by national artist Fernando Amorsolo. Diaz and her siblings were forced by their parents to take up piano classes and ballet classes. According to her, when she became a filmmaker, she realized the importance of art in her youth.

Growing up, Diaz was not a film buff, and rather had more interest in literature and history. An event that lead her to film was her applying for Communication Arts in the Assumption Convent. She intended to enroll in Asian Civilizations studies but was not able to because the History Department was closed. Because of this she enrolled in Communication Arts and intended to stay for only one semester, but her love for theater acting free. During her time in college, she produced plays at the Cultural Center of the Philippines. Also in college, she was able to direct her first film.

She studied in several private schools (at St. Theresa's College from Kindergarten to High School), eventually graduating from Assumption College with a degree in Bachelor of Arts, major in Communication Arts in 1976. She went to Los Angeles for further studies and graduated from Loyola Marymount University with a degree in Master of Arts in Film and Television in 1978. She then went to London and completed the Film Course at London International Film School also in 1978.

== Career ==
She entered the Philippine cinema industry in 1980 as a director. Diaz-Abaya's films are known for the struggles of the marginalized, and yet she never thought of a career in filmmaking while growing up in private Catholic schools for the elite.

Diaz-Abaya and her husband, after living in London, went back to the Philippines and got together with some theater friends to start an independent film company, Cine Filipinas, which was funded by their parents. Though Diaz-Abaya and her film company were able to produce films together, their films flopped at the box office and lost money. After this event, she met Jesse Ejercito, an independent film producer who recognized and enjoyed the cinematography and art direction of Diaz-Abaya's film Tanikala.

Diaz directed and released her first feature film, Tanikala (Chains) in 1980. Since then, she has been one of the most active and visible directors in Philippine cinema.

Jesse Ejercito gave Diaz-Abaya the opportunity to make a film and Diaz-Abaya proposed to have Ricky Lee, whom she has only heard of and not met, as a writer for her film. Ricky Lee would then be known as one of Diaz-Abaya's collaborators in film and credited as the screenplay writer for several of Diaz-Abaya's films. Lee and Diaz-Abaya's first collaboration was making Brutal, which premiered at the Metro Manila Film Festival in 1980. Brutal was a success and Ishmael Bernal, a highly regarded Filipino filmmaker, saw the film and wanted to meet Diaz-Abaya. Bernal became Diaz-Abaya's mentor. After her success with Brutal, she then directed Macho Gigolo.

Her early films Brutal, Karnal (Of the Flesh), and Alyas Baby Tsina, sharply condemn the oppressive social system during the administration of Philippine President Ferdinand Marcos. When the Marcos was deposed in 1986, Diaz left filmmaking.

Díaz produced television programs for several years. Her work attempts to reflect the social and political problems to attain social reform. She admittedly uses her work as a tool to uphold, promote, and protect the state of democracy in the Philippines.

Marilou Diaz-Abaya was the treasurer of the directors’ union under Lino Brocka for several years. In 1983, Diaz-Abaya joined the Concerned Artists of the Philippines, organized by Lino Brocka, and was an active member that opposed film censorship by the Marcos regime and joined in anti-government rallies.

In the early 1980s, Lily Monteverde, a prominent Filipino film producer for Regal productions, asked Diaz-Abaya to make Sensual (Of the Senses), a coming-of-age film that covered sexual topics. It premiered one day before the 1986 EDSA Revolution.

In 1993, she again directed films, beginning with the release of Kung Ako'y Iiwan Mo. She continued directing such films as Ang Ika-Labing Isang Utos: Mahalin Mo, Asawa Mo (The Eleventh Commandment: Love Thy Spouse), Ipaglaban Mo: The Movie (Redeem Her Honor), May Nagmamahal Sa'yo (Madonna and Child), Sa Pusod ng Dagat (In the Navel of the Sea), José Rizal, and Muro-Ami (Reef Hunters). Her body of work is a continuous examination of difficult social problems in the country. Her works often deal with the lives of the Filipino poor, women, and children who struggle to survive under harsh conditions.

Arguably her most famous work, José Rizal, featured actor César Montano playing the national hero.

A Japanese award-giving body described her body of work to be "harmoniously blending entertainment, social consciousness, and ethnic awareness." The organization continued by saying: "(Her work) has won acclaim both in the Philippines and abroad for its high level of artistic achievement. It is an ideal manifestation of the artistic culture of Asia, and so is most deserving of the Arts and Culture Prize of the Fukuoka Asian Culture Prizes."

== Personal life ==
She was married to cinematographer and educator Manolo Abaya, relative of Plaridel Abaya and they have two sons: singer/actor Marc Abaya and David Abaya, a cinematographer. Her nephew, Joseph Emilio "Jun" Abaya, who was Congressman of Cavite and became Secretary of Transportation and Communication.

She met Manolo when she was 15 years of age, and Manolo helped her turn to filmmaking. Marilou and Manolo got married in Manila and soon after, went to live in London as Marilou studied at the London International Film School. Manolo and Abaya would work together. Manolo would usually be credited as the director of photography and editor for most of Diaz-Abaya's work.

She referred the city of Fukuoka in Japan as her second home because of her films became well-regarded and recognized by critics and moviegoers.

== Death ==
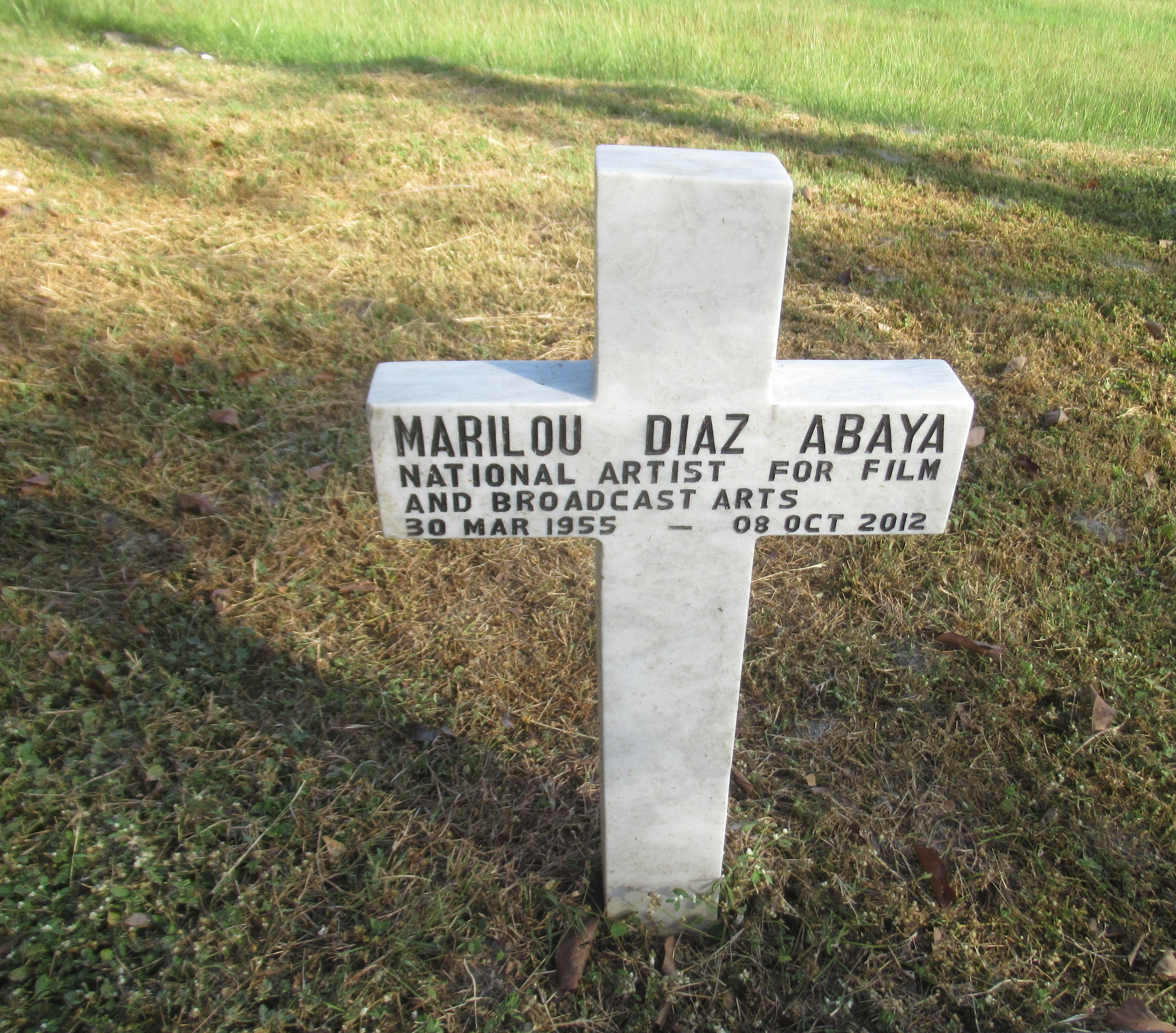
Diaz-Abaya's present grave site at Libingan ng mga Bayani

Diaz-Abaya was diagnosed with breast cancer, which caused her death on October 8, 2012. She was buried at Loyola Memorial Park in Marikina until October 2023, when her remains were exhumed and then, transferred to the Libingan ng mga Bayani in Taguig.

== Awards ==
Diaz is the 2001 Laureate of the Fukuoka Prize for Culture and the Arts in Japan. She has won numerous directing awards from award-giving bodies such as the Metro Manila Film Festival, the Urian Awards, the Film Academy of the Philippines, the Famas Awards, the Star Awards, the Catholic Mass Media Awards the British Film Institute Award, the International Federation of Film Critics Award (FIPRESCI), and the Network of Pan Asian Cinema Award (NETPAC).

On June 10, 2022, Malacañang Palace, upon the joint recommendation of the National Commission for Culture and the Arts (NCCA) and the Cultural Center of the Philippines (CCP), officially announced Marilou Diaz-Abaya as National Artist for Film and Broadcast Art together with Nora Aunor and Ricky Lee, by virtue of Proclamation no. 1390 granted by then President Rodrigo Roa Duterte.

== Organizations ==
Diaz was an active film and television producer and director. She was a director of the Film Development Council of the Philippines, the president of the Marilou Diaz-Abaya Film Institute and Arts Center and Dive Solana Inc., a film instructor at the Ateneo de Manila University, a trustee of the Jesuit Communications Foundation and the AMANU Media Apostolate, and a member of the Silsilah Dialogue Movement for Peace, the Artists for Peace, the Mothers for Peace, and the World Association of Psycho-Socio Rehabilitation.

== Filmography ==
Díaz directed at least 21 full-length feature films which include internationally exhibited films with English titles and subtitles. The partial list includes the following:

- Tanikala (Chains; 1980)
- Brutal (Brutal; 1980)
- Moral (1982)
- Karnal (Of the Flesh; 1983)
- Minsan Nating Hagkan Ang Nakaraan (1983)
- Baby Tsina (1984)
- Sensual (Of the Senses; 1986)
- Kung Ako'y Iiwan Mo (1993)
- Ang Ika-Labing Isang Utos: Mahalin Mo Asawa Mo (11th Commandment: Love Your Spouse; 1994)
- Ipaglaban Mo!: The Movie (Redeem Her Honor; 1995)
- May Nagmamahal Sa'yo (Madonna and Child; 1996)
- Milagros (1997)
- Sa Pusod ng Dagat (In the Navel of the Sea; 1998)
- José Rizal (1998)
- Muro-Ami (Reef Hunters; 1999)
- Bagong Buwan (New Moon; 2001)
- Noon at Ngayon: Pagsasamang Kay Ganda (2003)
- Maging Akin Muli (television film, 2005)
- Ikaw ang Pag-ibig (2011)

Unfinished films:

- 1986: Four Days in February (about the People Power Revolution, in EDSA); shelved due to political reasons.
- 1990: Victory Boy (about the presence of US Bases in the Philippines; particularly the US Naval Base, in Olongapo); supposed to star then Senator Joseph Ejercito Estrada and Philippine superstar Nora Aunor; shelved due to political reasons; discontinued when the US Military Bases were removed in 1991.

== Videography ==
Díaz has also directed television shows such as the following:

- Public Forum (1986–1995), a public affairs talk show hosted by Randy David.
- Sic O'Clock News (1987–1990), a news satire program.
- Various documentaries including Silsilah Dialogue Movement for God's Peace.
- Men of Light, a weekly talk show on the scriptures based in San Fernando, Pampanga, hosted by Fr. Pablo Virgilio David, Fr. Raul de los Santos, and Fr. Deo Galang.

== Awards ==
Year	Award-Giving Body	Category	Work	Result
1981	FAMAS Awards	Best Director	Brutal	Nominated
1983	FAMAS Awards	Best Director	Moral	Nominated
1984	FAMAS Awards	Best Director	Karnal	Won
1997	FAMAS Awards	Best Director	May Nagmamahal Sa Iyo	Nominated
1999	FAMAS Awards	Best Director	José Rizal	Won
2000	FAMAS Awards	Best Director	Muro Ami	Won
2002	FAMAS Awards	Best Director	Bagong Buwan	Won
2003	FAMAS Awards	Best Director	Noon at Ngayon	Nominated
1980	Metro Manila Film Festival	Best Director	Brutal	Won
1998	Metro Manila Film Festival	Best Director	José Rizal	Won
1999	Metro Manila Film Festival	Best Director	Muro Ami	Won
1999	Metro Manila Film Festival	Best Original Story (with Ricky Lee and Jun Lana)	Muro Ami	Won

== Frequent collaborators ==
Work Writer/ Performer	1980	1980	1981	1982	1983	1983	1984	1986	1993	1994	1995	1996	1997	1998	1998	1999	2001	2003	2005	2011
Work Writer/ Performer	! class="nowrap ts-vertical-header " style="" | Tanikala	Brutal	Boystown	Moral	Minsan Pa Nating Hagkan ang Nakaraan	Karnal	Alyas Baby Tsina	Sensual	Kung Ako'y Iiwan Mo	Ang Ika-11 na Utos: Mahalin Mo ang Asawa Mo	Ipaglaban Mo!: The Movie	May Nagmamahal Sa'yo	Milagros	Sa Pusod ng Dagat	José Rizal	Muro-Ami	Bagong Buwan	Noon at Ngayon: Pagsasamang Kay Ganda	Maging Akin Muli	Ikaw ang Pag-ibig
Ricky Lee																				
Amado Lacuesta Jr.																				
Jose Y. Dalisay Jr.																				
Jose Javier Reyes																				
Jun Robles Lana																				
Lorna Tolentino																				
Gina Alajar																				
Sharmaine Arnaiz																				
Cesar Montano																				
Joel Torre																				
Vilma Santos																				
Rolando Tinio																				
Jaime Fabregas																				
Sandy Andolong																				
Charito Solis																				
Jhong Hilario																				
