= Stefano Mori =

Filipino actor and singer

- Born: Stefano Umberto Tareno Mori; January 16, 1985 (age 41); Ancona, Italy
- Occupations: Actor; Singer
- Years active: 1995–2002
- Agent: Star Magic (1995–2002)
- Spouse: Camille Victoria Dayot— Mori
- Children: 1
- Musical career
- Genres: Pop rock; OPM
- Instruments: Vocals, Rhythm Guitars
- Label: Star Music

Stefano Umberto Tareno Mori (born January 16, 1985) is a former actor with Filipino and Italian descent. He was also a former member of the band, JCS. Mori started his career at the age of 10 doing commercials then later on was cast in the youth-oriented show Ang TV (1995–1997).

In 1996, he played conrad in the movie May Nagmamahal Sayo that gave him an award together with actor Tom Taus. He played Benjamin Jimenez in the youth-oriented show G-mik (1999–2002).

Mori left his acting career year 2002 for the reason he felt burnt out and acting is not his calling. He went back year 2003 and made some ASAP guestings but later decided to disappear from the limelight for good.

== Personal Life ==
Stefano Mori was born on January 16, 1985 in Italy to his Italian father Mauro Mori and his Filipina mother, Marie Lourdes Tareno. He has a sister and brothers.

Mori attended ABS-CBN Distance Learning Center for high school. He finished a degree of BS Political Science in the Philippines after he quit his acting career

On 2016, rumors spread that he is engaged to his long time partner Camille Dayot a Filipina. On his wife's post last 2023, she confirmed that she and Mori are already married but didn't disclose the exact date of marriage.

On May 31, 2025, Mori welcomed his first daughter Valentina Sofia

== Musical career ==
Mori was part of the boyband trio JCS, together with John Prats and Carlo Aquino, where he played rhythm guitars as well as provided vocals. The group was originally formed as a dance group by Star Magic for ABS-CBN'S variety show ASAP in 1999. The group launched their debut album in 2000.

== Filmography ==
=== Film ===
Year	Title	Role	Notes	Source
1996	SPO4 Santiago	Santiago's son		
1996	May Nagmamahal Sa'yo	Conrad		
1996	Ama, Ina, Anak	Jason		
1996	Sa Aking mga Kamay	Young Gene		
1996	Ang TV Movie: The Adarna Adventure	Billy		
1998	Haba-baba-doo! Puti-puti-poo	Stefano		
2001	Tabi Tabi Po	Male vampire I		
2002	I Think I'm in Love	Dax		

=== Television ===
Year	Title	Role	Notes	Source
1995–1997	Ang TV	Himself		
1995–2002	ASAP	Himself	Performer	
1995–1996	Familia Zaragoza	Danilo Lagrimas		
1996	Maalaala Mo Kaya		Episode: "Holen"	
1996	Ipaglaban Mo!	Toti	Episode: Mapalad na Sawing Palad	
1997	!Oka Tokat	Joey	Episode: "Katulong sa Dilim"	
1997–1999	Mula sa Puso	Tonton		
1997	Hiraya Manawari	Mario	Episode: "Ang Agimat ni Ingkong Tano"	
1997–1999	Kaybol: Ang Bagong TV	Himself		
1997	Flames	Monching	Episode: "Lullabye"	
1997	Flames	Dodie	Episode: "Bisikleta"	
1997	Flames	Django	Episode: "I Hate Boys, I Hate Girls"	
1997	Flames	John	Episode: "Dance With Me"	
1997	Maalaala Mo Kaya		Episode: "Paputok"	
1997	Maalaala Mo Kaya		Episode: "Liwanag"	
1997	Maalaala Mo Kaya	Young Jose	Episode: "Piyesa"	
1997	Star Drama Theater: Camille	Mick	Episode: "Takot" (Camille Prats x Stefano Mori)	
1997	Wansapanataym	Miggy	Episode: "Ang Hiwaga ng Gintong Piseta"	
1997	Wansapanataym	Cedie	Episode: "Melchora Meets Cedie"	
1998	Maalaala Mo Kaya	Manuel	Episode: "Munggo"	
1998	Maalaala Mo Kaya	Crispin	Episode: "Talaarawan"	
1998	Maalaala Mo Kaya		Episode: "Siato"	
1998	Wansapanataym	Niño	Episode: "Sa Puso ng Dagat"	
1998	Wansapanataym	Jon	Episode: "Ali-Pin"	
1998	Wansapanataym	Bobit	Episode: "Field Trip, Side Trip"	
1998	Ipaglaban Mo!	Teddy	Episode: Sino ang Maysala	
1998	Oki Doki Doc	Himself	Episode: "Maricel Soriano"	
1998	Oki Doki Doc	Himself	Episode: "Stefano Mori"	
1998–1999	Cyberkada	Himself		
1999	Wansapanataym	Joker	Episode: "Flashing Gordon"	
1999	Wansapanataym	Edwin	Episode: "Heartland"	
1999	Oki Doki Doc	Jake	Episode: "Onyok Velasco"	
1999	Oki Doki Doc	Himself	Episode: "Angelica Panganiban"	
1999	Oki Doki Doc	Jerry	Episode: "Sunshine Cruz"	
1999	Maalaala Mo Kaya		Episode: "Tula"	
1999–2002	G-mik	Benjamin "Borj" Jimenez		
1999	Star Drama Theater: Serena	Chikoy	Episode: "Sa Wala Sa Meron" (Serena Dalrymple x Stefano Mori)	
1999–2001	Marinella	Jun		
2000	Pahina	Popoy	Episode: "Mga Buhay Sa Looban"	
2000	Arriba, Arriba!	Jerry		
