= Milagros (film) =

1997 drama film by Marilou Diaz-Abaya

- Film poster
- Directed by: Marilou Diaz-Abaya
- Written by: Rolando S. Tinio
- Produced by: Jesse Ejercito
- Starring: Sharmaine Arnaiz; Dante Rivero; Elizabeth Oropesa; Joel Torre; Raymond Bagatsing; Nonie Buencamino
- Cinematography: Eduardo "Totoy" Jacinto
- Edited by: Jess Navarro
- Music by: Nonong Buencamino
- Production company: Merdeka Film Productions
- Distributed by: Merdeka Film Productions
- Release date: April 9, 1997
- Running time: 130 minutes
- Country: Philippines
- Language: Filipino

Milagros is a 1997 Filipino drama film directed by Marilou Diaz-Abaya from a screenplay written by Rolando S. Tinio, based upon his Carlos Palanca Award-winning screenplay Kalapati. The film stars Sharmaine Arnaiz in the title role.

== Plot ==
Milagros (Sharmaine), a bar girl, finds out that her father has died, leaving her and her mother Meding (Elizabeth) in considerable debt. To pay for their debt, Milagros accepts the offer to work as a maid in the house of her father’s creditor Nano (Dante) and his three sons. Soon, each of them ends up falling in love with Milagros, causing strain to the family.

== Cast ==
- Sharmaine Arnaiz as Lagring
- Dante Rivero as Nano
- Joel Torre as Junie
- Raymond Bagatsing as Benneth
- Nonie Buencamino as Ramonito
- Elizabeth Oropesa as Miding
- Mia Gutierrez as Arlene
- Rolando Tinio as Fr. Fermin
- Joe Jardi as Bebot
- Tanya Gomez as Chayong
- Jim Pebanco as Pilo
- Ramon Reyes as Cirilo

== Reception ==
Released to Philippine theaters on April 9, 1997, Milagros performed poorly at the box office. Nonetheless, it won 10 out of 15 awards in the 21st Gawad Urian Awards, including Best Film, and was later on featured in various film festivals. It was selected as the Philippine entry for the Best Foreign Language Film at the 70th Academy Awards, but was not accepted as a nominee.
