= Johnny Delgado =

Filipino actor, writer and comedian (1948–2009)

- Born: Juan Marasigan Feleo; February 29, 1948; Manila, Philippines
- Died: November 19, 2009 (aged 61); Quezon City, Metro Manila, Philippines
- Resting place: Loyola Memorial Park, Marikina, Philippines
- Other name: Johnny
- Occupations: Actor, comedian, writer
- Years active: 1968–2009
- Spouse: Laurice Guillen
- Children: Ana Feleo; Ina Feleo
- Parent(s): Ben Feleo; Victorina Marasigan

Juan Marasigan Feleo (February 29, 1948 – November 19, 2009), known professionally as Johnny Delgado, was a Filipino television and movie actor, comedian, and writer. He is best known for his television work on the TV gag show Goin' Bananas. Other roles include the films Kakabakaba Ka Ba? and Tanging Yaman. The latter won him the FAMAS Award and the Metro Manila Film Festival Award for Best Actor in 2000.

== Personal life ==
He was born as Juan Marasigan Feleo on February 28, 1948, in Manila. He is the son of Ben Feleo, a film director, and Victorina Marasigan, an educator. Johnny had his formal education at Colegio de San Juan de Letran.

He was the husband of actress-director Laurice Guillen and the father of actresses Anna Feleo and Ina Feleo. Besides his work in film and television, he also appeared in the Philippine version of Coca-Cola's TV commercial for Cherry Coke. He was posthumously inducted to the Philippines Eastwood City Walk of Fame in December 2010 one year after his death.

== Illness and death ==
Delgado was diagnosed with cancer in 2008. Early that year, Delgado assured that he was responding well to chemotherapy. A healthy and strong Delgado went so far to attend the birthday celebration of Sen. Jinggoy Estrada in February 2009. He announced there that he was in remission.

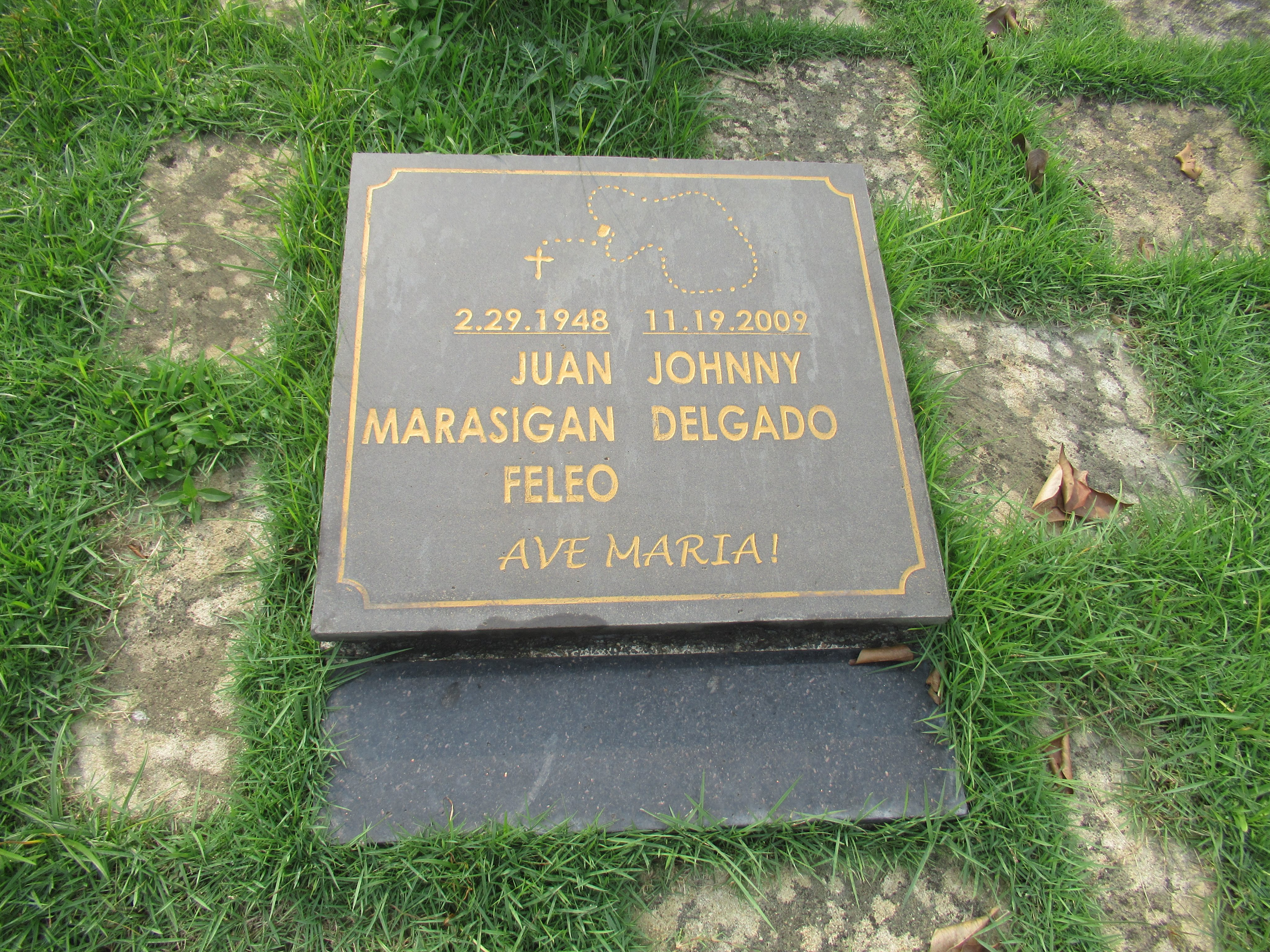

The cancer suddenly metabolized again in November 2009, and he was rushed to St. Luke's Medical Center in Quezon City. After being discharged on November 17, he died on November 19, 2009, of lymphoma, and was interred at Loyola Memorial Park in Marikina five days later on November 24. He preceded his father in death, as Ben Feleo would die nearly two years later of a stroke.

== Partial filmography ==
=== Film ===
- Bawat Kanto Basagulo (1968)
- Banaue (1975)
- Jaguar (1979)
- Ang Alamat ni Julian Makabayan (1979)
- Kakabakaba Ka Ba? (1980)
- Brutal (1980)
- Aguila (1980)
- San Basilio (1981) – Señor Escobar
- Mga Uod at Rosas (1982)
- Batch '81 (1982)
- M.I.B.: Men in Brief (1983) – Francis Phillips
- Bad Bananas sa Puting Tabing (1983)
- Huwag Kang Papatay (1984)
- Alyas Baby Tsina (1984)
- Somewhere (1984) - Logan
- Misteryo sa Tuwa (1984) - Mesiong
- Ang Padrino (1984)
- Batang Quiapo (1986) - Rigor
- Bukas ng Sabado agi Buka Sa Sabitan (1986)
- Balweg (1987) - Ka George
- Pepeng Kuryente: Man with a Thousand Volts (1988) .... Richard
- Tubusin mo ng Dugo (1988) .... Lt. Piodoroda
- A Dangerous Life (1988) .... Lt. Col. Eduardo "Red" Kapunan, Jr.
- Joe Pring: Homicide, Manila Police (1989)
- Hindi Pahuhuli nang Buhay (1989)
- Dadaan Ka sa Ibabaw ng Aking Bangkay (1990)
- Alyas Pogi: Birador ng Nueva Ecija (1990) .... Hepe Rogelio Banzon
- Medal of Valor: Habang Nasusugatan Lalong Tumatapang (1991) .... Kumander Dayang
- Alyas Ninong: Huling Kilabot ng Tondo (1991) .... Kapitan Tamayo
- Mayor Latigo (1991) .... Romero
- Alyas Pogi 2 (1991) .... Active Footage
- Contreras Gang (1991) .... Tinyente Pascual
- Lumayo Ka Man sa Akin (1992) .... Jaime
- Alyas Boy Kano (1992) .... Alvarez
- Amang Capulong: Anak ng Tondo II (1992)
- Emong Verdadero: Tatak ng Cebu II (Bala ng Ganti) (1992) .... Guido Medrano
- Eddie Tagalog: Pulisyante ng Mandaluyong (1992)
- Kahit Buhay Ko (1992) .... Chef Dinero
- Kamay ng Garuda (1992)
- Patayin si Billy Zapanta (1992)
- Pacifico Guevarra: Dilinger (1992)
- Hanggang May Buhay (1992)
- Kanto Boy: Alyas Totoy Guwapo (1992)
- Sala sa Init Sala sa Lamig (1993)..... Valero
- Tatak ng Kriminal (1993)
- Elsa del Castillo Story (1994)
- Macario Durano (1994) .... Velasquez
- Hindi Pa Tapos ang Laban (1994) ..... Congressman
- Tanging Yaman (2000)
- Hari ng Selda: Anak ni Baby Ama 2 (2002)
- Kailangan Kita (2002)
- Pakners (2003)
- Santa Santita (2004) – actor and co-writer
- La Visa Loca (2005)
- Summer Heat (2006)
- You Got Me! (2007)
- Urduja (2008)
- Labing-labing (2009, short film) – his last movie role. Directed by his daughter Ina Feleo, co-starring his wife Laurice Guillen

=== Television ===
- Goin' Bananas (1986–1991)
- Lovingly Yours (1987–1996)
- A Dangerous Life (television film; 1988)
- Maalaala Mo Kaya (1991–2009)
- Noli Me Tangere (1995–1996)
- 1896 (ABC 5) (1996)
- Arriba, Arriba! (2000)
- Maynila (2001)
- Kay Tagal Kang Hinintay (2002)
- All Together Now (2003)
- Te Amo, Maging Sino Ka Man as Mayor Arnaldo Camacho (2004)
- Mga Anghel na Walang Langit (2005)
- Calla Lily (2006)
- Global Shockers (2006–2007) – Host
- Maria Flordeluna (2007)
- Kamandag (2008)
- May Bukas Pa (2009) – guest role. This was his last television appearance.

== Awards ==
=== FAMAS Awards ===
- 1976 – Banaue – Best Supporting Actor
- 1977 – Mrs. Teresa Abad ako po si Bing (1976) – Best Supporting Actor
- 1980 – Ang Alamat ni Julian Makabayan – Best Supporting Actor
- 1981 – Kakabakaba ka ba? – Best Supporting Actor
- 1988 – Balweg – Best Supporting Actor
- 1990 – Joe Pring: Homicide Manila Police (1989) – Best Supporting Actor
- 1993 – Lumayo Ka Man sa Akin – Best Supporting Actor
- 1995 – Macario Durano – Best Supporting Actor
- 2001 – Tanging Yaman – Best Actor (won)
- 2006 – La Visa Loca – Supporting Actor
- 2007 – Kaleldo – Best Actor

=== FAP Awards, Philippines ===
- 2005 – Santa Santita – Best Screenplay (with Jerry Gracio and Michiko Yamamoto)
- 2006 – La Visa Loca – Best Supporting Actor (won)
- 2007 – Ligalig – Best Supporting Actor (won)

- also nominated for Best Supporting Actor

=== Gawad Urian Awards ===
- 1981 – Kakabakaba ka ba? – Best Supporting Actor (won)
- 1982 – Salome – Best Actor
- 1993 – Lumayo Ka Man sa Akin – Best Supporting Actor
- 2001 – Tanging – Best Actor
- 2003 – Kailangan Kita – Best Supporting Actor
- 2006 – La Visa Loca – Best Supporting Actor

- Brutal – Best Actor / Best Supporting Actor

=== Metro Manila Film Festival ===
- 1979 – Ang Alamat ni Julian Makabayan – Best Supporting Actor (won)
- 2000 – Tanging Yaman – Best Actor (won)
- 2006 – Ligalig – Best Supporting Actor (won)
