= Sa Pusod ng Dagat =

1998 film by Marilou Diaz-Abaya

- Videotape cover
- Directed by: Marilou Diaz-Abaya
- Written by: Jun Lana
- Produced by: Marilou Diaz-Abaya
- Starring: Jomari Yllana; Chin-Chin Gutierrez; Elizabeth Oropesa
- Cinematography: Romy Vitug
- Edited by: Jess Navarro
- Music by: Nonong Buencamino
- Production companies: GMA Films; Film Experts
- Distributed by: GMA Films
- Release date: March 13, 1998
- Running time: 114 minutes
- Country: Philippines
- Language: Filipino

Sa Pusod ng Dagat (transl. In the Navel of the Sea) is a 1998 Filipino drama film produced and directed by Marilou Diaz-Abaya and written by Jun Lana from his Palanca Award-winning screenplay Mga Bangka sa Tag-araw. It stars Jomari Yllana, Chin-Chin Gutierrez, and Elizabeth Oropesa, with supporting cast includes Pen Medina, Rolando Tinio, Jhong Hilario, and Ronnie Lazaro.

Produced by GMA Films and Film Experts, the film was theatrically released on March 13, 1998, and received critical acclaim from local and international film festivals.

== Plot ==
In a remote fishing island in the 1950s, Pepito (Jomari Yllana) grows up learning the trade of his mother, Rosa (Elizabeth Oropesa), the only midwife capable of delivering the newborn babies of their community. At first, the young son doesn't mind the unusual arrangement, but as he grows older, he begins to resist the role traditionally meant only for women.

In time, Pepito's coming of age intersects with the lives of other islanders whose beliefs and struggles become critical impetus to his maturity. Eventually, embarrassment and prejudices are overcome by acceptance and love between mother and son.

== Cast ==
- Jomari Yllana as Pepito
- Elizabeth Oropesa as Rosa
- Chin Chin Gutierrez as Mrs. Santiago (as Chin-Chin Gutierrez)
- Pen Medina as Gusting
- Rolando Tinio as Apo
- Mia Gutierrez as Tale
- Tanya Gomez as Minda
- Manjo del Mundo as Mr. Santiago
- Ronnie Lazaro as Berto
- Jhong Hilario as Luis
- LJ Moreno as Sara

== Production ==
Production of the film began in June 1997 under the working title Mga Bangka sa Tag-araw.

== Awards and nominations ==
The film received nominations and awards from different local award-giving bodies. It got two Star Awards in 1999 for Cinematographer of the Year (Romy Vitug) and Original Screenplay of the Year (Jun Lana).

The film had received invitations from 17 prestigious film festivals abroad, an unprecedented achievement in the history of Philippine cinema.

"Sa Pusod Ng Dagat" is the country's official entry to the Singapore International Film Festival, Toronto International Film Festival, Hong Kong Film Festival, Fukuoka International Film Festival, Tokyo International Film Festival and Oslo Film Festival. It is an entry to the film festivals in London, Cairo, Bombay, Barcelona, Haifa and New York.

The film also made it to the Chicago International Film Festival, Montreal Film Festival, Nantes Festival of Free Continent and Chicago Film Festival. It was also the Philippine entry for Best Foreign Language Film in the Oscars.
