= Rolando Tinio =

Filipino writer (1937–1997)

Rolando S. Tinio
- Born: March 5, 1937; Tondo, Manila, Philippine Commonwealth
- Died: July 7, 1997 (aged 60); Manila, Philippines
- Resting place: Himlayang Pilipino Memorial Park, Quezon City
- Education: University of Santo Tomas; State University of Iowa
- Occupations: Filipino writer and actor
- Children: Antonio and Victoria
- Awards: Order of National Artists of the Philippines

Rolando Santos Tinio (March 5, 1937 – July 7, 1997) was a Filipino poet, dramatist, director, actor, critic, essayist and educator.

== Biography ==
Rolando Tinio was a Philippine National Artist for Theater and Literature. He was born in Gagalangin, Tondo, Manila on March 5, 1937. As a child, Tinio was fond of organizing and directing his playmates for costumed celebrations. He was an active participant in the Filipino movie industry and enjoyed working with Philippine celebrities who he himself had admired in his childhood. Tinio himself became a film actor and scriptwriter. He is often described as a religious, well-behaved and gifted person. Tinio graduated with honors (a magna cum laude achiever) with a degree in Philosophy from the Royal and Pontifical University of Santo Tomas at age 18 in 1955 and an M.F.A. degree in Creative Writing: Poetry from the University of Iowa.

In Iowa, Tinio was known as a great writer that used English as the medium of the Filipino writer. He wrote his poetic collection: Rage and Ritual which won an award from the University of the Philippines. Bienvenido Lumbera, also an alumnus of the Royal and Pontifical University of Santo Tomas, describes this collection as elegant and with a truly contemporary tone if taken from the European literary critical view. At this point in time, Tinio believed that only English can hone the themes that he wanted to communicate in his works. Once, in a conference, an author delivered his belief in the value of the Tagalog dialect in Creative Writing. In response to this, Tinio published an article in the scholarly journal Philippine Studies, which contained parts of English poems translated into Tagalog. The article's purpose was to prove the inadequacy of Tagalog as the writer's medium (Lumbera).

In the mid-1960s, however, Tinio decided to try writing in Tagalog and the product of this trial was the collection of poems now called Bagay. Rolando Tinio was the sole inventor of "Taglish" in Philippine poetry. Through this, he gave an authentic tone to the poetry of the native middle-class Filipino. In 1972, Tinio wrote another poetry collection, Sitsit sa Kuliglig, and this showed the great contrast between his old and new advocacy. If in Rage and Ritual, portrayals of art and the artist that are not closely associated with the Filipino lifestyle are communicated, Sitsit sa Kuliglig clearly portrays the everyday experiences of a Tondo-grown individual now living in Loyola Heights. Heaven and earth; the gap between Tinio's works in English and those in Tagalog (Lumbera).

Tinio was also an actor, director, and a set and costume designer. He served all these roles during his stay with the Ateneo Experimental Theater. Tinio chose the plays, designs the stage, directs, creates the costumes and determines the musical score and other sounds. Productions of the Ateneo Experimental Theater are completely his vision. In his production of Oedipus Rex, he replaced the Greek costumes with modern renditions made primarily of metal pipes supposedly to express the thought of the industrial 20th century (Lumbera).

His work with the Ateneo Experimental Theater expresses the concept of the actor being merely one of the director's tools in shaping the stage; communicate his vision through all aspects of the production. The last production of Tinio's "personal" theater company was entitled ?. The production was performed in a classroom rather than an auditorium and Tinio made the actors mingle freely with the audience. There is no real "meaning" in the action and there is no definite storyline. The "meaning" is hidden in the intentional actions of the actors and the unexpected reply of the audience (Lumbera).

He published four seminal books of poems between 1972 and 1993, in which, along with his longtime friend, Bienvenido Lumbera, helped modernize the traditionally sentimental Filipino style. He had also worked on his own projects such as the Ateneo Experimental Theater productions and other serious dramas in Filipino. His contributions to Philippine literature and theater are immense. His contributions include establishing the Filipino Department of Ateneo de Manila.

Circa 1976, Tinio also wrote the lyrics for the six hymns of the "Misa ng Alay-Kapwa", the music for which was composed by Fr. Eduardo P. Hontiveros, S.J. The most popular of these hymns still sung in Churches throughout the Philippines is Buksan ang Aming Puso. These hymns were published in the now-out of print Mga Awiting Pansamba.

== Illness and death ==
Rolando Santos Tinio died at home in Manila on July 7, 1997, at age 60. His wife, theater and film actress Ella Luansing, had died some years before. He was survived by his two children, Antonio and Victoria.

== Work ==
=== Poetry collections ===
- "Sitsit sa Kuliglig" (Whistling at Cicadas) or (Shusshing Cicadas) (1972)
- "Dunung-Dunungan" (Pedantry) (1975)
- "Kristal na Uniberso" (Crystal Universe) (1989)
- "Trick of Mirrors" (1993)
- "Ang Burgis sa Kanyang Almusal"(1970)

=== Translated plays ===
- "Laruang Kristal" (The Glass Menagerie) (1966)
- "Pahimakas sa Isang Ahente" (Death of a Salesman) (1966)
- "Paghihintay Kay Godo" (Waiting for Godot) (1967)
- "Miss Julie" (1967)
- "Rama Hari" (Rama, King) (1980)

=== Essay collections ===
- "A Matter of Language, Where English Fails" (1990)

=== Newspaper columns ===
- "Touchstones" for Metro Manila (1977)
- "Totally Tinio" for Manila Chronicle (1986–1987, 1990)
- "In Black and White" for Philippine Daily Globe (1987–1989)

== Filmography ==
=== Film ===
- Aguila (1980)
- Of the Flesh (1983) - Bino
- Bilangin ang Bituin sa Langit (1989) – Principal
- Demonstone (1990) – Prof. Olmeda
- Kadenang Bulaklak (1994) - Fr. Barrientos
- Forever (1994) – Mr. Malicsi
- Run Barbi Run (1995) – Mr. Tengko
- Muling Umawit ang Puso (1995) – Dindo
- May Nagmamahal Sa'yo (Madonna and Child) (1996) - Father Nicandro
- Mumbaki (1996) – Ngidulu
- Bakit May Kahapon Pa? (1996) - Priest
- Milagros (1997) – Fr. Fermin
- Curacha: Ang Babaeng Walang Pahinga (1998) – Propaganda vendor
- Sa Pusod ng Dagat (1998) – Apo

=== Television ===
- A Dangerous Life (1988) - Jaime Sin
- Noli Me Tangere (1993) – Pilosopong Tasio
- Bayani (1995) - Lolo

== Achievements ==
Tinio was known for translating Western classics, which includes the works of Sophocles, Shakespeare, Ibsen, Chekhov, Puccini and Verdi, into Tagalog. He did these translations in order to advance the Filipino language. He was a prolific poet and writer who helped establish the Filipino-language drama in the 1970s.

He was made a National Artist of the Philippines for Theater and Literature in 1997.

=== Other achievements of Tinio ===
- Ten Outstanding Young Men (1967)
- Patnubay ng Sining at Kalinangan, City government of Manila (1967)
- Gantimpalang Quezon sa Panitikan (1977)
- Gawad CCP Para Sa Sining for Theater (1993)

Year	Award	Category	Nominated work	Result
1998	Gawad Urian	Best Screenplay	Milagros	Won
1999	FAMAS Awards	Best Story	Sidhi	Won

== Family ==
Tinio was related to Manuel Tinio, a Tagalog revolutionary general who fought in the Ilocos during the Philippine-American War.
