= Moral (1982 film) =

1982 film directed by Marilou Diaz-Abaya

- Theatrical release poster
- Directed by: Marilou Diaz-Abaya
- Written by: Ricky Lee
- Produced by: Jesse Ejercito
- Starring: Lorna Tolentino; Gina Alajar; Sandy Andolong; Anna Marin
- Cinematography: Manolo Abaya
- Edited by: Manolo Abaya; Marc Tarnate
- Music by: George Canseco
- Production company: Seven Star Productions
- Distributed by: Seven Star Productions
- Release date: December 25, 1982
- Running time: 138 minutes
- Country: Philippines
- Languages: Filipino; English

Moral is a 1982 Filipino coming-of-age drama film directed by Marilou Diaz-Abaya and written by Ricky Lee. It is the second in a loose trilogy of feminist films by Diaz-Abaya and Lee which discusses women's issues, along with Brutal (1980) and Karnal (1983). Set in contemporary times in the Philippines, the film stars Lorna Tolentino, Gina Alajar, Sandy Andolong and Anna Marin as a group of friends and follows the course of their lives over the course of several years after they graduate from college. A "loosely structured, observational drama", the film discusses several topics that Diaz-Abaya and Lee saw as taboo at the time, such as abortion, rape, and gender inequality in the context of the changing morals of the time. This is Seven Star Productions' last feature film.

Moral has grown in stature over time and is now considered by some critics as one of Diaz-Abaya's best works. Both Diaz-Abaya and Lee consider the film one of the most personal of their many collaborations. It was restored by the ABS-CBN Film Restoration Project in 2017, premiered at that year's Cinema One Originals Film Festival, and was subsequently shown at several film festivals around the world.

== Plot ==
Joey, Kathy, Sylvia, and Maritess are four students at the University of the Philippines Diliman. The film opens with the marriage of Maritess to Dodo, and follows the occasionally intersecting lives of the four friends.

Maritess is initially content with simply being a housewife for Dodo. At the friends' graduation, Maritess goes into labor and gives birth to a baby boy. She experiences difficulties taking care of the baby, including quarreling with her mother-in-law, postpartum depression, and not having any more time for herself. Over time, she grows discontented with her marriage and lack of freedom and tells Maggie of her desire to leave Dodo. One day, Dodo rapes Maritess; she leaves him and temporarily lives with Sylvia. She eventually allows them to get back together on the condition that she is treated as an equal in the relationship.

Joey is a drug user who regularly sleeps around with different men, and has a tense relationship with her mother Maggie. She is in love with activist Jerry and continually makes advances at him, which are rejected. She becomes pregnant and asks for money from her friends and mother for an abortion. Before that can happen, she miscarries and is told by a doctor that she is incapable of having children. Jerry joins the rebellion in the mountains and asks Joey to let his wife Nita live with her. Nita stays with Joey and does housework for her until she learns that Jerry has been killed. Nita tells Joey and then leaves to join the rebellion.

Sylvia has separated from her husband Robert, whom she still has feelings for. She and Robert continue to spend time together as they share custody of their son, and Sylvia becomes friends with Robert's partner Celso. She meets Ernie, a fellow teacher at the school she works for, and the two begin a relationship together — her first serious relationship since her marriage with Robert. One day, a woman shows up at her house and states that she is Ernie's wife and that Ernie has another wife in the province whom he has abandoned. Sylvia breaks up with Ernie.

Kathy is a mediocre singer aspiring to become a star. Her lesbian talent agent, JM, explains that her public image is more important than her singing ability; Kathy adopts a persona of a spiritual hippie in interviews and provides sexual favors to JM to keep her as a client. She also sleeps with corporate executive Mr. Suarez, who promises that he can make her famous, but only for a short time. Kathy asks Sylvia to tell her if she honestly thinks she is a good singer. When she says no, Kathy stops recording her album and starts to sing only for fun and to improve her skills.

The film ends with the four friends laughing with each other in a car on the way to drop off Joey at the airport for a vacation with Maggie.

== Cast ==
- Lorna Tolentino as Joey
- Gina Alajar as Kathy
- Sandy Andolong as Sylvia
- Anna Marin as Maritess
- Juan Rodrigo as Robert
- Michael Sandico as Jerry
- Ronald Bregendahl as Dodo
- Lito Pimentel as Celso
- Mia Gutierrez as Nita
- Laurice Guillen as Maggie

== Themes ==
Moral is considered part of a loose trilogy of feminist films directed by Marilou Diaz-Abaya and written by Ricky Lee which directly discuss issues affecting women, along with Brutal (1980) and Karnal (1983). The film is set in the Philippines in the late 1970s and early 1980s during the Martial Law era, described by Asian Cinevision as a "time of moral flux", noting that the film's characters "find themselves in situations when old values and principles no longer apply". Diaz-Abaya and Lee also decided to explore topics they deemed to be taboo at the time, such as homosexuality, marital rape, and the New People's Army, while eschewing traditional narrative structure and creating a film with "no plot", as described by Lee. He stated that the film contains no inciting incidents and has no story; Professor Rommel Rodriguez of the University of the Philippines Diliman noted that the film, as it simply portrayed the lives of its four main characters, did not have a clear beginning, middle, or end, leaving viewers without certainty as to the ultimate fates of the characters.

Filmmaker and film historian Nick Deocampo noted that the major differences in the personalities of the four friends allowed the film to explore the different aspects of womanhood in the tumultuous 1970s. Lee deemed the script as one of his most personal, as he used stories and anecdotes from his real friendships as inspiration for the events in the film. Diaz-Abaya also considered Moral as one of her "most sentimentally important" films.

== Production ==
Diaz-Abaya's 1980 film Brutal, which was also written by Lee and produced by Jesse Ejercito, was not only a critical success but also achieved box-office success at the Metro Manila Film Festival, grossing more than even Ang Panday (1980) featuring action star Fernando Poe Jr. Following that success, Ejercito aimed to produce another film with Diaz-Abaya starring the two main stars of Brutal: Gina Alajar and Amy Austria. Following infighting between Ejercito and Austria, Austria was removed from the project. At this point, Lee already had a finished script; its plot revolved around two singers, a talented one and an untalented one, as the less talented one found greater career success. Following the departure of Austria from the project, Diaz-Abaya and Lee decided to be more daring with the film and Lee rewrote the script to be about four friends while retaining the original story of an untalented singer who found career success. Lee wrote the script for Moral simultaneously with the script for Ishmael Bernal's Himala, and both films competed at the 1982 Metro Manila Film Festival.

=== Censorship ===
According to director Marilou Diaz-Abaya in the 1983 British documentary episode about the cinema of the Philippines, reported by Tony Rayns, Moral was hit by the censors due to the sequences that were deemed offensive to the Armed Forces of the Philippines. The then-Board of Censors for Motion Pictures ordered 13 cuts to the film and the director submitted the master negative print of the film to the censor board.

== Reception ==
Moral was initially dismissed by most critics and the general public. Diaz-Abaya herself noted that she was "not surprised at all" at the lack of favorable audience reception to the film due to its unconventional structure. At the Metro Manila Film Festival, it was overshadowed by Himala, which won Best Picture.

A few notable critics had positive opinions of Moral on its initial release: National Artist Bienvenido Lumbera, film scholar Joel David, and fellow directors Bernal and Eddie Romero. Additionally, Juan Rodrigo and Sandy Andolong won the Best Supporting Actor and Actress at the 1982 FAMAS Awards for their performances, and Lee won Best Screenplay at the Metro Manila Film Festival.

Over time, the film's popularity among critics increased, due in part to repeated cable showings and retrospectives of works written by Lee. By 1989, in a poll of critics and filmmakers commissioned by David to determine the greatest Filipino movies ever made, Moral ranked 12th. Additionally, in a 2019 poll commissioned by critic Skilty Labastilla of more than 100 fellow film critics and filmmakers on the best Filipino films directed by a woman, Moral ranked first. According to Lorna Tolentino, Moral helped change her image among critics as an actress who only appeared in "sexy movies", as it showcased her acting abilities.

== Release ==
=== Restored and remastered version ===
The ABS-CBN Film Restoration Project released a digitally restored and remastered version of Moral in 2017. Initially, the project deemed it impossible to restore as there was no surviving copy of the film negatives that had not been heavily damaged. The copy found at the film archives of the Cultural Center of the Philippines had been severely damaged by flooding and a lack of air conditioning at the storage facility. A restorable copy was subsequently sourced from the collection of the Film Development Council of the Philippines; it took nearly 2,600 restoration hours to restore by Italian film restoration lab company, L’Immagine Ritrovata, in Bologna, Italy. The restoration did not completely resolve the issues with the film, particularly regarding its color and sound, due to severe mold damage. The restored version premiered at the 2017 Cinema One Originals Film Festival's Restored Classics section.

=== Home media ===
The film was released by Kani Releasing on Blu-ray in 2024, alongside Karnal.

== Sequel ==
In 2003, a sequel to Moral was released titled Noon at Ngayon: Pagsasamang Kay Ganda. This film took place 20 years after the events of the original film, with only Laurice Guillen reprising her role as Joey's mother, Maggie.
