= Gina Alajar =

Filipino film actress and television director

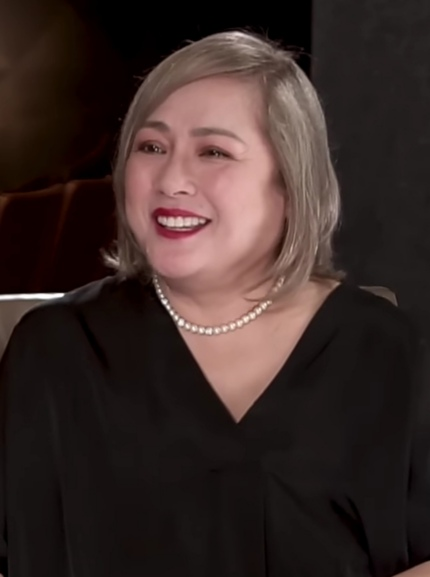
- Alajar in 2023
- Born: Regina Liguid Alatiit; June 28, 1959 (age 66); Tondo, Manila, Philippines
- Occupations: Actress, television director
- Years active: 1968–present
- Spouse: Michael de Mesa (m. 1978; ann. 2006)
- Awards: FAMAS Award – Best Supporting Actress; 1997 Malunay, Sa Pusod ng Paraiso; 1991 Biktima Gawad Urian Award – Best Supporting Actress; 1991 Biktima; 1997 Malunay: Sa Pusod ng Paraiso; Gawad Urian Award – Best Actress; 1981 Brutal; 1982 Salome; 1983 Moral; 1986 Bayan Ko: Kapit sa Patalim – Best Supporting Actress; 2011 Amaya

Regina Liguid Alatiit (born June 28, 1959), known professionally as Gina Alajar (Tagalog pronunciation: [alaˈhar]), is a Filipino film and television actress and director. One of the most awarded actresses in Philippine cinema, she has won the Philippine movie grand slam, receiving several Best Actress or Best Supporting Actress wins at FAMAS, Gawad Urian and Luna Awards.

== Career ==
Since appearing as a child actress in the early 1970s, Alajar has been a critically acclaimed actress. She has appeared in films such as Playgirl, Bayan Ko, Brutal, Salome, Mulanay, and has collaborated with directors such as Lino Brocka, Ishmael Bernal, Maryo J. de los Reyes, Chito S. Roño, Gil Portes, Marilou Diaz-Abaya, her directorial work has been enhanced in the 2000s in television work for GMA Network dramas.

From 1997–2009, she was seen mostly in television soap operas on GMA and in 2009–2010, she was seen in ABS-CBN dramas such as Kambal sa Uma and 2010's Habang May Buhay. In 2012, she received more massive acclaim for the TV series Hiram na Puso, a comeback feat in her TV career on GMA Network.

In 2016, she came back to television in the fantasy afternoon drama Magkaibang Mundo as a main antagonist. In 2018, she starred in the daytime drama Hindi Ko Kayang Iwan Ka as an antagonist-protagonist role of Adelaida "Adel" Angeles.

In 2021, she was back in the remake of 1988 movie Nagbabagang Luha as Calida Montaire originally played by Gloria Romero as Imelda Montaire, she went viral a backhanded slap to Claire Castro which portrayed Cielo and dragged into the red cake and pouring liquid on flower to Claire.

== Personal life ==
Alajar was part of Dulaang UP. She has three sons with Michael de Mesa, from whom she is separated: Ryan, Geoff and A.J. Eigenmann.

== Filmography ==
=== As an actress ===
==== Film ====
Year	Title	Role	Note(s)	Ref(s).
1967	Kaibigan Kong Sto. Niño	Oreng		
1968	Donata	Donata		
1969	Pinagbuklod ng Langit	Irene Marcos		
1969	Si Darna at ang Planetman	Narda		
1970	Mga Anghel Na Walang Langit			
1970	Wanted: Perfect Mother	Dorina		
1971	Mag-inang Ulila			
1972	My Little Brown Girl			
1973	Zoom, Zoom, Superman!	The Possessed		
1973	Cofradia	Cofradia		
1975	Big J			
1977	Mahiwagang Kris			
1977	Malayo Man, Malapit Din			
1978	Boy Pana (Terror ng Maynila '63)			
1979	Dead or Alive: Arrest the King of Carnappers			
1979	Ang Leon, ang Tigre at ang Alamid			
1980	Diborsyada	Gina		
1980	Wanted: Wives			
1980	Manila by Night	Vanessa		
1980	Anak ng Maton			
1980	Brutal	Cynthia		
1981	Playgirl			
1981	High School Scandal			
1981	Wild			
1981	Kontrobersyal	Maria Theresa Eigenmann		
1981	Ako ang Hari			
1981	Salome	Salome		
1981	Caught in the Act	Rowena		
1982	Brother Ben	Lina		
1982	Karding			
1982	Moral	Kathy		
1983	Caged Fury	Nguyet		
1983	Ganti			
1984	Kaya Kong Abutin ang Langit	Nancy		
1984	This Is My Country	Luz Manalastas	Original title: Bayan Ko: Kapit sa Patalim	
1984	Pieta, Ikalawang Aklat			
1984	Sister Stella L.			
1984	Condemned	Mayette		
1984	Bukas... May Pangarap	Mering		
1984	Bulaklak sa City Jail	Juliet		
1985	Hindi Mo Ako Kayang Tapakan	Josephine		
1985	Ano ang Kulay ng Mukha ng Diyos?	Lani		
1985	The Moises Padilla Story (The Missing Chapter)			
1986	Mabuhay Ka... sa Baril!	Eloisa		
1986	Paano Hahatiin ang Puso?	Alicia		
1986	The Graduates			
1986	Salamangkero			
1987	Tatlong Ina, Isang Anak	Belle		
1988	Hiwaga sa Balete Drive	Gilda	"Ikatlong Mata" segment	
1988	Birds of Prey			
1988	Babaing Hampaslupa	Desiree		
1989	Fight for Us	Esper	Original title: Orapronobis	
1990	Biktima	Laura Malicat		
1990	Andrea, Paano Ba ang Maging Isang Ina?	Joyce		
1991	Kailan Ka Magiging Akin	Shirley		
1991	Emma Salazar Case			
1991	Shake, Rattle & Roll III	Rowena	"Ate" segment	
1992	Lucia			
1992	Shake, Rattle & Roll IV	Puri	"Ang Madre" segment	
1992	The Wild Cowboys	Regina Smith		
1993	The Myrna Diones Story: Lord, Have Mercy!			
1993	Teenage Mama			
1994	Sige, Ihataw Mo			
1995	Campus Girls	Mrs. Rosales		
1995	The Lilian Velez Story: Till Death Do Us Part			
1995	Ipaglaban Mo: The Movie	Atty. Lilia Manalang	"Rape: Case No. 538832" segment	
1995	Victim No. 1: Delia Maga (Jesus, Pray For Us!) – A Massacre in Singapore	Delia Maga		
1996	Mulanay... Sa Pusod ng Paraiso	Norma		
1997	Puerto Princesa			
1997	Frats	Oning		
1998	Tatlo... Magkasalo			
1998	Mother Ignacia – Ang Uliran	Young Mother Ignacia		
1998	José Rizal	Saturnina Rizal		
1999	Sa Piling ng Mga Aswang	Lola Munda		
2000	The Debut	Gina Mercado		
2001	Bahay ni Lola			
2002	Small Voices	Chayong	Original title: Mga Munting Tinig	
2002	Singsing ni Lola	Esper		
2002	Ang Agimat: Anting-Anting ni Lolo	Clarita		
2002	Mano Po	Gina Go		
2003	Sanib			
2005	Pinoy/Blonde			
2005	Lovestruck	Amalia		
2006	All About Love		"About Anna" segment	
2006	Mainit Na Tubig			
2006	Batad: Sa Paang Palay			
2006	Mano Po 5: Gua Ai Di (I Love You)			
2007	Desperadas	Patrick's mother		
2007	Shake, Rattle and Roll 9	Myrna	"Christmas Tree" segment	
2009	Grandpa Is Dead	Marieta "Mameng" Hernandez	Original title: Ded Na si Lolo	
2009	Fuchsia	Nena		
2009	Dukot			
2009	Shake, Rattle & Roll XI	Tita Beth	"Diablo" segment	
2010	Sigwa			
2012	Guni-Guni	Mrs. Arevalo		
2012	Mater Dolorosa			
2012	The Reunion	Joanne		
2015	The Last Pinoy Action King	Herself		
2017	Dark Is the Night	Sara	Original title: Madilim ang Gabi	
2017	Nabubulok	Ingrid		
2017	Pastor	Mildred Aguila		
2019	Last Fool Show	Joanna Lee		
2019	Misterio de la Noche			
2019	Circa	Maria		
2021	Big Night!	Dharna's mother		
2023	Monday First Screening	Lydia	Lead role	
2023	Pieta	Beth		
2023	When I Met You in Tokyo	Susan		
2025	Everyone Knows Every Juan	Rose Sevilla		
TBA	The Rapists of Pepsi Paloma	Charito Solis		

==== Television ====
Year	Title	Role	Notes
1980–1996	Lovingly Yours, Helen		
1988	Evelio	Alyssa	
1988	Hello, Uncle Sam?		
1992	Cebu		
1992	De Buena Pamilya		
1993	GMA Telecine Specials		
1994	Bisperas ng Kasaysayan	Isabel	
1998	Maalaala Mo Kaya: Kinky Hair		
1998	Mula sa Puso	Elena	
1998	GMA Telecine Specials: Pasada		
2001–2002	Ikaw Lang ang Mamahalin	Lilian Delos Santos	
2004	Magpakailanman: "The Jennylyn Mercado Story"	Thelma	
2005–2006	Vietnam Rose	Amanda Hernandez	
2006	Noel	---	
2006	Majika	Adana	
2007	Asian Treasures	Elvira	
2007	Sine Novela: Sinasamba Kita	Corazon	
2007–2008	Sine Novela: Pasan Ko ang Daigdig	Metring Velez	
2008	Carlo J. Caparas' Joaquin Bordado	Doctora Regina	
2008	Sine Novela: Una Kang Naging Akin	Luisa Yumul	
2009	Jim Fernandez's Kambal sa Uma	Celeste Miranda-Ledesma	
2009	SRO Cinemaserye Presents: Carenderia Queen	Waray	
2009–2010	Sana Ngayong Pasko	Felicidad "Fely" Dionisio	
2010	StarStruck (season 5)	Herself (Mentor)	
2010	Habang May Buhay	Rose Alcantara-Caparas	
2010	Sine Novela: Trudis Liit	Lollipop "Lolly" Toledo-Ferrer	
2011	Pablo S. Gomez's Machete	Elena	
2011–2012	Amaya	Dian Lamitan	
2012	Valiente	Iluminada "Luming" Soledad- Valiente	
2012	Hiram na Puso	Zeny Banaag	
2012	Luna Blanca	Linda De Jesus	
2012	Protégé: The Battle For The Big Artista Break	Herself (Mentor)	
2012	Magpakailanman: "The Mirriam Castillo Story"	Mirriam Castillo	
2016	Magkaibang Mundo	Noreen Sandoval-Perez	
2017	D' Originals	The 4th Original (Guest Appearance)	
2017	Magpakailanman	Co-lead role	
2017	Alaala: A Martial Law Special	Sara Ilagan	Television documentary film
2018	Hindi Ko Kayang Iwan Ka	Doña Adelaida "Adele" Angeles	
2018	Sirkus	Lola Waya	
2019	Sahaya	Almida Caliste	
2021	Nagbabagang Luha	Calida Montaire	
2022	Start-Up PH	Ligaya "Joy" Sison	
2024	Asawa ng Asawa Ko	Carmen Salcedo	
2024	Lilet Matias: Attorney-at-Law	Hon. Liberty Villaroman	
2026	Never Say Die	Rebecca Dizon	

=== As director ===
==== Television ====
Year	Programs	Role	Notes
1995	GMA Telesine Specials: Sa Pagdating ng Bagong Umaga	Director	
1995–1996	Kadenang Kristal	Director	
1999–2001	Rio Del Mar	Director	
1999–2001	Kirara, Ano ang Kulay ng Pag-ibig?	Director	
2003–2004	Narito ang Puso Ko	Director	
2003	Hawak Ko ang Langit	Director	
2003–2004	Walang Hanggan	Director	
2005	Tahanan: Eat Bulaga Special	Director	
2010–2012	Reel Love Presents Tween Hearts	Director	
2011	Machete	Director	
2012	Luna Blanca	2nd Unit Director	
2012–2013	Magdalena: Anghel sa Putikan	Director	
2012–2013	Temptation of Wife	2nd unit director	
2013	Unforgettable	Director	
2013	Anna Karenina	Director	
2013–2014	Villa Quintana	Director	
2014	Eat Bulaga! Lenten Special: Kulungan Kanlungan	Director	
2014–2015	Yagit	Director	
2015	Let the Love Begin	Director	
2015–2016	The Half Sisters	Director	52 episodes
2015–2016	Destiny Rose	Director	
2017	Pinulot Ka Lang sa Lupa	Director	
2018–2019	Onanay	Director	
2019–2022	Prima Donnas	Director	
2023	Magpakailanman: Sa Puso't Isipan: The Cantillana Family Story	Director; Won for Best Single Drama/Telemovie/Anthology—Asian Academy Creative Awards	

=== Film (as director) ===
- Angels (segment "Angel's of Mine", 2007)
