= Pinay Pie =

- DVD release cover
- Directed by: Jose Javier Reyes
- Written by: Jose Javier Reyes
- Produced by: Charo Santos-Concio; Malou N. Santos
- Starring: Ai-Ai delas Alas; Joyce Jimenez; Assunta De Rossi; Vhong Navarro; Carlos Agassi; Onemig Bondoc; Rafael Rosell
- Cinematography: Ricardo 'D-Boy' Trofeo
- Edited by: Vito Cajili
- Music by: Jesse Lucas
- Production company: Star Cinema
- Distributed by: Star Cinema
- Release date: September 3, 2003 (Philippines)
- Running time: 110 minutes
- Country: Philippines
- Language: Filipino

Pinay Pie is a 2003 Filipino comedy film, directed by award-winning multi-genre director Jose Javier Reyes. The film was released to Philippine theaters on September 3, 2003. It stars Joyce Jimenez, Assunta De Rossi and Ai-Ai delas Alas on the lead roles. It is a film about girl power. De las Alas plays Yolly, an aging woman who searches for the man of her dreams. De Rossi plays Love, a beautiful young lady who wants to be famous, and Jimenez plays Karen, an overly hardworking woman.

The film's producer, Star Cinema Productions Inc. owned by ABS-CBN Corporation, borrowed actors Brad Turvey and Edward Mendez, from rival TV network, GMA Artist Center (now Sparkle GMA Artist Center). Due to the strong box-office result of Ang Tanging Ina (2003), the scenes of Ai-Ai delas Alas in the film were extended.

== Plot ==
The story of three modern Filipina childhood friends share their love of pies. Yolly (Ai-Ai delas Alas) an aging buy-and-sell businesswoman, Karen (Joyce Jimenez) a director for a men’s fashion magazine, and Love, (Assunta de Rossi) Karen’s cousin, a makeup artist and saleswoman who aspires to be a beauty queen. The three friends meet for lunch and Love reveals her plan to join another pageant after her losing streak from the previous pageants. This time, she plans to join ‘Dyosa ng Kagandahan.’ Yolly reveals that her cop boyfriend, SPO Pablito (Carlos Agassi) might propose tonight. At her job, Love asks her admirer Elmo (Onemig Bondoc) to drive her to tryouts. Karen’s magazine sales declines and her supervisor employs Butch (Vhong Navarro), an eccentric director to boost the sales. As Yolly prepares to meet SPO Pablito, her mother gets happy. Pablito brings Yolly to meet his mother (Vangie Labalan) who happens to be a strict and disapproves of Yolly and her job. During the tryouts, Love meets a judge named George (Carlo Maceda). After ditching Elmo to go out with George, Love gets drunk while George takes photos of her in a swimwear. Karen decided to surprise her live-in boyfriend, Art (Rafael Rosell) but catches him with another woman in bed. Yolly tells Pablito that if he proposes, she will say yes. She tells her mother that Pablito didn’t propose but Yolly’s mother encourages her to pursue Pablito’s mom and warns her that he might be the last chance to experience real love.

The next day, the three meet again, with Karen sharing her news and Yolly worrying about Pablito's silence. At her job, Butch causes trouble much to Karen’s frustration. Yolly brings a buko pie at Pablito’s home but meets his mother and turns her down, she sees that Pablito is obviously hiding from her. Love’s brother discovers the photos of his sister on the internet. Karen double checks and sees that it is real. Despite the humiliating news, Love gloats over the photos spreading and gaining attention. She along with Karen and their family concludes that George took the photos. Love gets disqualified for the photos but blackmails the pageant director for forcing contestants to date the sponsors and not rewarding her the monetary consolation prize she won last pageant, giving her a chance to be in the competition. Yolly sees Pablito and he reveals that his mother forbid him to see her again, officially breaking up. Over dinner, the three friends share their pain caused by men and started a pact to never date another man. On a shooting day, Butch fails to come on time and causes problem with the photoshoot. When the police arrive, Butch blames Karen and the other crew members for the lewd content and gets them arrested. Love gets fired for performing under time. While shopping for clothes, Yolly meets two young foreigner men named Jonas and Jason (Brad Turvey, Edward Mendez) and separately, they court her later. Love and Karen’s family reprimands Karen for the arrest and causing humiliation in the family. While gossiping, Yolly tells Love about Jason and Jonas, she explains that she is just letting them court her. Along with Elmo, they arrived at the hotel where the contestants have to stay for the duration of the competition. They meet Pablito, his mother, and Greta (Jenny Miller) who happens to be Pablito’s grand-sibling and Love’s roommate for the competition. The lewd scandal forced Karen to make a public apology, but the disaster boosted the sales. Karen punches the arrogant Butch in the face as a gratitude. That night, Karen sees her ex-boyfriend Art with another girl. Heartbroken, Karen gets drunk and randomly meets Butch who was also on a night out. The two went out for a beer and Karen reveals her situation. She ended up sleeping in his apartment, but Butch iterates that they did not sleep together. Yolly, Karen, and Love discover that Greta is seeing George while also being Art’s new girlfriend. The three promises that Love must win the pageant as a revenge to the men who wronged them, although Karen and Yolly tells Love that she lacks intellect for the question-and-answer portion of the pageant. Together, they plan to expose Greta and George who are sneaking in another room with a video camera. With the help of Butch, Yolly, Karen and Elmo hangs Butch on the window beside George and Greta’s room to videotape the act.

Initially thinking they succeeded, the group celebrates but Butch discovers that he left the camera cap on while recording rendering the tape useless as evidence. Yolly, Karen, and Love argue over the failure and the two leave Love behind. Love and Karen’s family arrive to the venue. Pablito, his mother, and Art also happens to be in the audience. Butch, Jason, and Jonas reminds Yolly and Karen that they are lucky that they have been friends with Love all their life. The group arrives on the venue just in time. Love and Greta make it in the top three but during the question-and-answer portion, Love is asked by George about how the rise of technology will affect the lives of Filipinos. Love at first stutters, asking George to repeat the question and even asking for a translator. Love answers that people run technology and that the right people will rightfully use technology. Love wins the Dyosa ng Kagandahan 2003. On their way out, the three friends reconciles while SPO Pablito asks Yolly for forgiveness to which she rejects. The film ends with Karen and Butch sharing a kiss during a photoshoot, Love going on tour with Elmo who is now her boyfriend, and Yolly shopping with Jason and Jonas who are still fighting over her.

== Cast ==
- Ai-Ai delas Alas as Yolly: An aging businesswoman who buys clothes from ukay-ukay and sells them as brand new and original.
- Joyce Jimenez as Karen: An intelligent hardworking and fashionable woman who works in a men's fashion magazine.
- Assunta De Rossi as Love: The cousin of Karen, who works as a make up artist and aspiring beauty queen.
- Vhong Navarro as Butch: Karen's co-worker
- Onemig Bondoc as Elmo: Love's love interest.
- Carlos Agassi as SPO Pablito: Yolly's former love interest.
- Rafael Rosell as Artie: Karen's ex-boyfriend.
- Jenny Miller as Greta: Love's rival for crown and Pablito's current love interest.
- Brad Turvey as Jason: Yolly's love interest.
- Edward Mendez as Jonas: Yolly's love interest.
- Berting Labra as Eming
- Tiya Pusit as Tarcing: Yolly's mother
- Carlo Maceda as George Collins: One of the judges of Diyosa ng Kagandahan 2003.
- Manny Castañeda as Edward Lucero: the organizer of Diyosa ng Kagandahan pageant and antagonizing Love for crowning moment.
- Vangie Labalan as Ursula: SPO Pablito's mother who hates Yolly.
- Dustin Reyes as Cocoy
- Pinky Amador as Kelly
- Kimberly Diaz as Jane
- Donnah Alcantarah as Carly
- Raquel Villavicencio as Magda
- Madeleine Nicolas as Salud
- Dale Villar as Paegent host
- Gilleth Sandico as Vangie
- Jessette Prospero as Mrs. Corpuz

== Soundtrack ==
Songs were released by Star Records.

1. "Pinay Pie" by Ai-Ai delas Alas, Assunta De Rossi and Joyce Jimenez (written and produced by Lito Camo)
2. "Super Papa" by Ai-Ai delas Alas (written by Eric Claridades)
3. "Handa Ka na Ba" by Ai-Ai delas Alas (written by Aries Poclibco)
4. "Wag na Lang" by Heart Evangelista (written by Soc Villanueva and Jungee Marcelo)
5. "Cutie Cute Cute" by Mahal and Mura (written by Eric Claridades)
