= John Feir =

Filipino actor and comedian (born 1968)

- Born: December 26, 1968 (age 57); Manila, Philippines
- Occupations: Comedian; actor
- Years active: 2003–present
- Agent: Sparkle GMA Artist Center (2005–present)

John Feir (born December 26, 1968) is a Filipino comedian and actor. He is an exclusive talent of GMA Network and is known for his roles in the comedy programs Nuts Entertainment (2003) and Pepito Manaloto (2010–present).

== Career ==
Feir began his career in 1991 as a production assistant for various GMA Network programs, including Lunch Date and Salo-Salo Together, where he worked with actor Bayani Agbayani, then a props man. While working behind the scenes on the sketch comedy show Nuts Entertainment, he was unexpectedly asked by Joey de Leon to wear a wig from discarded props and portray a comedic character named "Belly" in an ending sketch. He accepted, marking the start of his acting career.

In 2005, he joined the main cast of the drama fantasy anthology series Ang Mahiwagang Baul, where he played the character Rextor. In 2008, he became part of the recurring cast of the drama action comedy series Joaquin Bordado, where he portrayed Johnny. In 2010, he gained widespread recognition in the sitcom series Pepito Manaloto, where he played the role of Patrick, the best friend of Pepito, portrayed by Michael V. In 2015, he was featured as one of the narrators in the fantasy anthology series Alamat. In 2016, he joined the recurring cast in the dramatic crime series Alyas Robin Hood, where he played Armando, alongside Dingdong Dantes.

In 2013, Feir received the Outstanding Supporting Actor in a Gag or Comedy Program at the Golden Screen TV Awards. That same year, he was also honored with the Best Supporting Actor award at the 27th PMPC Star Awards for Television.

== Filmography ==
=== Films ===
| Year | Title | Role |
|---|---|---|
| 2006 | Reyna: ang makulay na pakikipagsapalaran ng mga achucherva, achuchuva, achechenes | Pitty Mimi |
| 2009 | Ded na si Lolo | Sakla Player |
| 2009 | Kimmy Dora: Kambal sa Kiyeme | Manong Maning |
| 2009 | Yaya and Angelina: The Spoiled Brat Movie | Rey |
| 2009 | Ang Panday | Utal |
| 2010 | Mamarazzi | Dead Teenager's Parent |
| 2010 | Si Agimat at si Enteng Kabisote | Cameraman |
| 2010 | Shake Rattle and Roll 12 | Fermin |
| 2011 | Ang Panday 2 | Utal |

=== Television ===
| Year | Title | Role | Notes | Ref. |
|---|---|---|---|---|
| 2003–2008 | Nuts Entertainment | Himself / Belly | | |
| 2005 | Ang Mahiwagang Baul | Rextor | | |
| 2005 | K! The 1 Million Peso Videoke Challenge | Himself (contestant) | | |
| 2006 | Pinoy Meets World | Himself | | |
| 2007 | Super Twins | Policeman | | |
| 2007 | Mga Kuwento ni Lola Basyang | Bulag 6 | Episode: "Ang Walong Bulag" | |
| 2007 | Mga Mata Ni Anghelita | | | |
| 2007 | Zaido: Pulis Pangkalawakan | Doctor Eng | | |
| 2008 | Joaquin Bordado | Elvis | | |
| 2008 | Obra: Daddy Dearest | | | |
| 2009 | Ang Babaeng Hinugot sa Aking Tadyang | Domeng | | |
| 2009–2010 | Darna | Thomas | | |
| 2010–present | Pepito Manaloto | Patrick Generoso | | |
| 2011 | Dwarfina | | | |
| 2012 | Watta Job | Himself (interviewer) | | |
| 2013 | Indio | Juaning | | |
| 2013 | Magpakailanman | Jayjay | Episode: "Kriminal na biktima sa Saudi Arabia" | |
| 2014–2015 | Wagas | Ardy Roberto | Episode:"Miriam & Ardy Love Story" | |
| 2014–2015 | Wagas | Popoy | Episode: "Pugad sa Sementeryo: Popoy & Nancy Love Story" | |
| 2014–2015 | Wagas | Isidro | Episode: "Percy & Isidro Love Story" | |
| 2014; 2015 | The Ryzza Mae Show | Himself (guest) | | |
| 2015–2016 | Alamat | Tagapagsalaysay / Hunyango | | |
| 2015–2017 | Karelasyon | Older Brother / Kapitan | Episode role | |
| 2016 | That's My Amboy | Red Team Star Player | | |
| 2016 | Bubble Gang | Himself (various roles) | | |
| 2016 | Lip Sync Battle Philippines | Himself (contestant) | | |
| 2016 | Laff, Camera. Action! | Himself (Team B Contestant) | | |
| 2016–2017 | Dear Uge | Mark / Mario | | |
| 2016–2017 | Alyas Robin Hood | Armando Estanislao | | |
| 2016–2017 | Encantadia | Jigs | | |
| 2017 | Tsuperhero | Andy | | |
| 2017 | Mulawin vs. Ravena | Banoy | | |
| 2017 | Celebrity Bluff | Himself (contestant) | | |
| 2018 | The Lola's Beautiful Show | Himself (guest) | with Pekto | |
| 2022 | Regal Studio Presents | Manolo | | |
| 2022 | First Lady | Teddy | | |
| 2023 | Royal Blood | Gerald | | |
| 2024 | Walang Matigas na Pulis sa Matinik na Misis | Scammer | | |
| 2025 | Binibining Marikit | Salvador "Badong" Ramos | | |
| 2026 | The Master Cutter | Nestor | Supporting role | |
