= List of Stairway to Heaven (Philippine TV series) episodes =

Stairway to Heaven is a 2009 Philippine television drama romance series broadcast by GMA Network. The series is based on a 2003 South Korean television series of the same title. It premiered on the network's Telebabad line up from September 14, 2009, to December 11, 2009, replacing Adik Sa'Yo.

Mega Manila ratings are provided by AGB Nielsen Philippines.

== Series overview ==
| Month | Episodes | Monthly Averages |
| Month | Episodes | Mega Manila |
|---|---|---|
| September 2009 | 13 | 28.3% |
| October 2009 | 22 | 29.5% |
| November 2009 | 21 | 33.0% |
| December 2009 | 9 | 31.0% |
| January 2010 | 21 | 33.0% |
| Total | 65 | 30.5% |

== Episodes ==
=== September 2009 ===
| No. | Title | Original air date | AGB Nielsen Ratings (Mega Manila) | Timeslot Rank | Primetime Rank | Ref. |
|---|---|---|---|---|---|---|
| 1 | "Cholo and Jodi's First Moment" | September 14, 2009 | 33.5% | #2 | #4 | |
Young Cholo meets young Jodi, and their friendship grew. Until Cholo plans to confess his love to his latter. Will he succeed?
| 2 | "Jodi's Charming Clown" | September 15, 2009 | 32.1% | #2 | #3 | |
Cholo may have delayed professing his true feelings for Jodi, but he never ceases to surprise his childhood best friend just to make her happy.
| 3 | "Maita Ruins Cholo and Jodi's date" | September 16, 2009 | 32.1% | #1 | #2 | |
While Cholo is more than ready to confess his true feelings for Jodi, Maita ruins their planned date by sending in Eunice to their meeting place.
| 4 | "Cholo and Jodi's Romantic Carousel Ride" | September 17, 2009 | 32.5% | #1 | #3 | |
Despite distractions and hindrances caused by Maita and Eunice, nothing will make Cholo and Jodi's relationship fall apart as long as the two have their unbreakable emotional bond.
| 5 | "Cholo and Jodi's Go on Separate Ways" | September 18, 2009 | 32.1% | #2 | #3 | |
Now that Cholo is far away from Jodi, who will be her shoulder to cry on in times of need?
| 6 | "Welcome Home, Cholo!" | September 21, 2009 | 28.7% | #2 | #6 | |
Years may have passed, but Cholo's unconditional love for Jodi hasn't changed since then.
| 7 | "From Childhood Sweethearts to Engaged Couple" | September 22, 2009 | 30.7% | #2 | #5 | |
Upon returning to the Philippines for a brief vacation, Cholo won't let his chances of being with Jodi fade away that's why he decided to propose to the love of his life. Will she accept his wedding proposal?
| 8 | "Cholo's Last Kiss" | September 23, 2009 | 28.2% | #2 | #8 | |
Will Cholo and Jodi's still push through now that Maita and Eunice are coming up with a sinister plan that will rip the two apart?
| 9 | "Cholo's Mourns Jodi's Sudden Passing" | September 24, 2009 | 28.6% | #2 | #7 | |
Cholo couldn't accept the fact that he gets to see Jodi's remains in a morgue, without knowing this was all staged by Eunice.
| 10 | "Jodi Suffers from Amnesia" | September 25, 2009 | 29.2% | #1 | #6 | |
After getting run over by Eunice back at the airport, Jodi remembers nothing about the accident and suffers from amnesia.
| 11 | "Jodi's New Life as Jenna" | September 28, 2009 | 16.7% | #2 | #7 | |
Agreeing with his sister's advice, Tristan decided to run away with Jodi as they both mask under their new identities—Charles and Jenna.
| 12 | "Jenna Follows the Sound of Cholo's Piano" | September 29, 2009 | 19.0% | #1 | #4 | |
Curious about the guy that she saw at the beach, Jenna follows the sound of the piano melody she heard—without knowing that this was Cholo.
| 13 | "Clueless Jodi Sees Cholo Again" | September 30, 2009 | 24.5% | #1 | #3 | |
After getting involved in a minor car accident, will Jodi recognize Cholo even if she doesn't remember anything yet?

=== October 2009 ===
| No. | Title | Original air date | AGB Nielsen Ratings (Mega Manila) | Timeslot Rank | Primetime Rank | Ref. |
|---|---|---|---|---|---|---|
| 14 | "Cholo Gets a Glimpse of Jodi" | October 1, 2009 | 27.4% | #1 | #3 | |
After seeing Jodi at the mall recently, how could Cholo be certain that the woman he saw turns out to be the person he thought was already dead?
| 15 | "The Reunion of Estranged Lovers" | October 2, 2009 | 27.6% | #1 | #2 | |
After five years of longing for Jodi, Cholo finally gets to embrace his greatest love when he thought she's been gone for ages.
| 16 | "Jenna Meets Her Stalker" | October 5, 2009 | 22.2% | #2 | #4 | |
Not knowing completely everything about her past, Jenna gets curious why this mysterious guy keeps on calling her Jodi. How will she confront him about this?
| 17 | "How to Persuade Jenna?" | October 6, 2009 | 27.7% | #1 | #2 | |
Will Jenna give Cholo a chance to get to know him better before accusing him of being a creepy stalker?
| 18 | "Cholo Gets Jealous" | October 7, 2009 | 24.2% | #1 | #3 | |
Much to his disappointment that Jodi couldn't remember anything about her past, Cholo has a hunch that Charlie has something to do with this.
| 19 | "Eunice Seduces Cholo" | October 8, 2009 | 27.2% | #1 | #3 | |
Getting desperate on how she'll be able to manipulate Cholo, Eunice takes advantage of the former's drunkness which led her to seduce him.
| 20 | "Cholo Teases Grumpy Jenna" | October 9, 2009 | 28.7% | #1 | #2 | |
No matter how frequent he gets shut down by Jenna, Cholo will do everything in his power to give her a helping hand so they could get closer.
| 21 | "Cholo Intimidates the New Hire" | October 12, 2009 | 29.2% | #1 | #2 | |
To confirm if Jenna is not in any way related to Jodi, Cholo decides to hire her so he could get to know the former better.
| 22 | "Joyride With Cholo" | October 13, 2009 | 31.2% | #1 | #2 | |
Jenna is grateful that Cholo has given her a chance to work for him at the company, a secret she couldn't hide any longer to Charlie.
| 23 | "Stolen Kiss from the Long-long Lovers" | October 14, 2009 | 30.5% | #1 | #3 | |
Still convinced that his fashion designer is his long-lost lover, Cholo takes his chances once again to remind Jenna of her past as they pay a visit to the beach house.
| 24 | "Charlie Makes a Big Decision" | October 15, 2009 | 32.7% | #1 | #2 | |
Out of his extreme drunkenness, Charlie bursts out to Jenna that she is actually Jodi. Will the latter believe in her boyfriend's sudden outburst?
| 25 | "Cholo Vs. Tristan" | October 16, 2009 | 29.2% | #1 | #3 | |
As Cholo tries to convince Jenna to stay in his company, a furious Charlie rushes home to teach the former a lesson without knowing his true identity as Tristan, Eunice's estranged brother.
| 26 | "Wrath of the Mystery Girlfriend" | October 19, 2009 | 33.4% | #1 | #2 | |
Thinking that Jenna is the whole point of Cholo's cold treatment towards Eunice, the latter could no longer contain her anger when she got to see Jenna again.
| 27 | "The Best Birthday Gift for Cholo" | October 20, 2009 | 30.4% | #1 | #4 | |
Devastated over the outcome of his birthday, Cholo receives his best gift when Jenna surprised him at the office.
| 28 | "Welcome Back, Jenna!" | October 21, 2009 | 32.1% | #1 | #2 | |
Nothing stops Cholo from getting what he wants as he pushes Jenna to work for his company again, much to Eunice's dismay.
| 29 | "Estranged Lovers Almost Kiss" | October 22, 2009 | 31.5% | #1 | #3 | |
Believing that admitting his feelings for Jenna would help her cancel her wedding plans with Charlie, Cholo chases after the former before kissing her on the lips.
| 30 | "Aftermath of the Enchanting Kiss" | October 23, 2009 | 28.9% | #1 | #3 | |
The morning after their enchanting kiss, Cholo and Jenna could not hide their genuine happiness when they got to share an elevator ride together.
| 31 | "Cholo and Jodi's Brief Intimate Moment" | October 26, 2009 | 28.9% | #1 | #3 | |
Everything seemed so well for Cholo and Jenna until Eunice and Charlie showed up to be upfront with their feelings.
| 32 | "Jenna is in Denial!" | October 27, 2009 | 31.2% | #1 | #2 | |
After getting into another big fight with Charlie because of Cholo, could Jenna be really in love with her boss?
| 33 | "Cholo and Jodi, the Ideal Married Couple" | October 28, 2009 | 29.6% | #1 | #3 | |
Badet's plans to get Cholo and Jenna together turned out to be successful as she was able to set them up as the wedded couple in their grandiose fashion show.
| 34 | "Tipsy Kiss from the Boss" | October 29, 2009 | 31.0% | #1 | #3 | |
Cholo and Jenna share a passionate kiss while at the club, surprising all of their officemates who celebrated after the success of their fashion show. How will Jenna get away with this without the knowledge of Charlie?
| 35 | "Jenna is Engaged!" | October 30, 2009 | 33.9% | #1 | #3 | |
Gushing over their kiss at the bar the other night, Jenna rushes home to tell Charlie that she wants to get married right away so she could divert her feelings away from Cholo.

=== November 2009 ===
| No. | Title | Original air date | AGB Nielsen Ratings (Mega Manila) | Timeslot Rank | Primetime Rank | Ref. |
|---|---|---|---|---|---|---|
| 36 | "Jenna's Surprise Groom" | November 2, 2009 | 32.1% | #1 | #3 | |
Jenna was on the verge of getting upset when Charlie runs late to appear at their civil wedding until Cholo surprisingly showed up. Will the wedding still push through?
| 37 | "Think, Eunice, Think!" | November 3, 2009 | 33.9% | #1 | #2 | |
Now that Jenna and Charlie's civil wedding did not push through, Eunice thinks of another plan that will further burn the former's bridges with Cholo.
| 38 | "Wicked Plan of the Desperate Ex" | November 4, 2009 | 29.4% | #1 | #3 | |
Because of her extreme insecurity, Eunice will do everything in her power to destroy Jenna's image to the company with the help of Maita and Tristan.
| 39 | "The Accident that Recovered Jodi's Memories" | November 5, 2009 | 34.0% | #1 | #3 | |
In a shocking accident, Jodi finally returns to her true self and recovers all of her memories after falling victim in a hit-and-run that was caused by Eunice.
| 40 | "Jodi Gets Frame Up" | November 6, 2009 | 35.4% | #1 | #2 | |
Even though Jodi has finally recovered all of her memories, she gets dragged in a controversy as Badet informs her that they are being accused of stealing money from the company.
| 41 | "Cholo and Jodi Almost Reunite" | November 9, 2009 | 34.6% | #1 | #2 | |
Just when Cholo and Jodi were about to reunite, Eunice and Maita came up with a plan that will stop them from seeing each other again.
| 42 | "Cholo Gets Blinded by the Truth" | November 10, 2009 | 34.7% | #1 | #2 | |
Even though Jodi is finally remembering everything, Cholo gets blinded by the truth after believing all of Tristan's claims about the former as Jenna.
| 43 | "Jodi's Last Hope" | November 11, 2009 | 32.5% | #1 | #2 | |
In order to prove that she's not a fraud, Jodi will try to find the friendship necklace that was once given to her by Cholo when they were young.
| 44 | "Cholo and Jodi's Most Awaited Reunion" | November 12, 2009 | 36.4% | #1 | #1 | |
Now that Jodi has been set free, she quickly rushes to Cholo to prove to him that she's innocent from all the accusations thrown against her.
| 45 | "Finding Jodi's Killer" | November 13, 2009 | 35.1% | #1 | #1 | |
As Jodi shares to Cholo what she can recall from the moment she lost all of her memories, the two will try to determine who attempted to run over the former.
| 46 | "Eunice Gets Exposed" | November 16, 2009 | 35.7% | #1 | #1 | |
All of Eunice's plans start to backfire as Jodi was able to prove to her father, Jovan, that she is indeed alive and someone attempted to kill her so she could be presumed dead.
| 47 | "Eunice Poisons Herself" | November 17, 2009 | 35.3% | #1 | #1 | |
Since Eunice couldn't accept the fact that Cholo loves Jodi more than her, she attempts to take her own life by drinking a fatal poison.
| 48 | "Cholo and Jodi are Engaged!" | November 18, 2009 | 35.3% | #1 | #2 | |
While Maita was quick to announce Cholo's upcoming wedding with Eunice to the public, in a surprising turn of events, the latter proposes to Jodi.
| 49 | "Problematic Eunice Threatens Cholo and Jodi" | November 19, 2009 | 35.2% | #1 | #2 | |
Eunice's desperation gets the best of her as she escapes the hospital and decides to make a scene upon meeting Cholo and Jodi again.
| 50 | "Jodi Makes a Selfless Decision" | November 20, 2009 | 29.3% | #1 | #3 | |
Feeling empathy towards Eunice's situation, Jodi becomes willing of lending Cholo to her step sister even if this rash decision will drastically affect their relationship.
| 51 | "Jodi Exposes Eunice's Dirty Schemes" | November 23, 2009 | 29.4% | #1 | #3 | |
Jodi never felt more betrayed as she was able to confirm that Eunice was just using her pretentious condition just so she could steal Cholo away from the former.
| 52 | "Cholo and Jodi Rush Their Wedding" | November 24, 2009 | 31.5% | #1 | #3 | |
After all the hurdles that their relationship faced, nothing fazes Cholo and Jodi's love for each other as they rush their wedding plans to get rid of Eunice.
| 53 | "Cholo Gives Up Everything for Jodi" | November 25, 2009 | 30.6% | #1 | #3 | |
Cholo proves to his mother that his love for Jodi will always prevail, even if his lush life is at stake.
| 54 | "Cholo Finds a New Job" | November 26, 2009 | 29.3% | #1 | #4 | |
Getting disowned by his own mother turned out to be a blessing in disguise for Cholo as he used this as a motivation to work hard for things on his own. Will he be able to secure a new job to survive with Jodi?
| 55 | "Jodi Slowly Loses Her Eyesight" | November 27, 2009 | 32.9% | #1 | #2 | |
Upon losing her consciousness when she experienced having blurry visions, Jodi went to see an ophthalmologist to determine what caused this incident to occur.
| 56 | "Jodi Confronts Cholo's Mother" | November 30, 2009 | 30.1% | #1 | #4 | |
Even though Jodi has pure intentions upon reaching out to Zoila, the former ends up getting reprimanded and gets told that Cholo wouldn't be in his pitiful situation if it weren't for her.

=== December 2009 ===
| No. | Title | Original air date | AGB Nielsen Ratings (Mega Manila) | Timeslot Rank | Primetime Rank | Ref. |
|---|---|---|---|---|---|---|
| 57 | "Jodi Gets Diagnosed With Cancer" | December 1, 2009 | 30.9% | #1 | #3 | |
Jodi's accident may have spared her life and caused her to lose memories temporarily, but it was little to her discovery that this would eventually scar her for life when she gets diagnosed with eye cancer.
| 58 | "Jodi Runs Away With Tristan" | December 2, 2009 | 33.5% | #1 | #2 | |
After parting ways with the woman she loves the most, Tristan gets shocked to see Jodi again and had to reprocess everything when the latter told him that she's leaving Cholo for good.
| 59 | "Where is Jodi?" | December 3, 2009 | 32.7% | #1 | #2 | |
Feeling anxious about Jodi's sudden disappearance, Cholo rushes back to the beach house to clear up his mind for all the things that have happened.
| 60 | "Jodi Goes Fully Blind" | December 4, 2009 | 32.1% | #1 | #3 | |
Jodi's cancer condition slowly spreads into her system as she starts to lose her eyesight, causing her to have frequent breakdowns.
| 61 | "Cholo Discovers Jodi is Blind" | December 7, 2009 | 29.4% | #1 | #6 | |
After getting into a brief encounter with Tristan, Cholo finds out that Jodi has gone blind and pushes him to check out on her.
| 62 | "Finding a Donor for Jodi" | December 8, 2009 | 30.2% | #1 | #4 | |
As Jodi's condition worsens, her doctor reveals to Cholo and Tristan that the former's cornea donor should come from a deceased person. Who will make the big sacrifice for her?
| 63 | "Eunice Makes a Scene at Cholo and Jodi's Engagement" | December 9, 2009 | 27.5% | #1 | #6 | |
Now that Cholo and Jodi are finally pushing through with their long-awaited wedding, a dreaded Eunice makes a scene at the engagement party and humiliates her mortal enemy in public.
| 64 | "The Surgery that Regained Jodi's Eyesight" | December 10, 2009 | 32.2% | #1 | #3 | |
Jodi cannot help but feel elated upon regaining her eyesight, without knowing that Tristan sacrificed his life just so she could see again.
| 65 | "Cholo and Jodi's Heavenly Wedding" | December 11, 2009 | 30.7% | #1 | #2 | |
Just when they thought everything was perfect, it all ends up in a painful heartbreak as Jodi dies on her wedding day.
