= Manny Castañeda =

Filipino actor, director and writer (died 2024)

- Born: Manuel Castañeda; 1954 or 1955
- Died: June 30, 2024 (aged 69)
- Occupations: Actor; director; screenwriter
- Years active: 1979–2024
- Notable work: Oro, Plata, Mata; Sana'y Wala Nang Wakas; Sic O'Clock News; Sakal, Sakali, Saklolo

Manuel Castañeda (1954 – June 30, 2024), better known as Manny Castañeda, was a Filipino actor, director and screenwriter.

== Career ==
Castañeda first appeared as an actor in the movie Aliw. He was best known for his roles in Oro Plata Mata, Sana’y Wala Nang Wakas, and Sakal, Sakali, Saklolo.

He also directed the movies Sa Kabilugan ng Buwan, May Isang Pamilya, and Shame.

== Death ==
Castañeda was found dead in his apartment on June 30, 2024, three days after he was last seen. According to his nephew, he died due to complications of heart and kidney disease.

== Filmography ==
=== As an actor ===
- Aliw (1979)
- Oro, Plata, Mata (1982)
- Relasyon (1982)
- Desire (1982)
- Bukas Luluhod ang Mga Tala (1984)
- Sana'y Wala nang Wakas (1986)
- Sic O'Clock News (1987–1990)
- Darna (1991)
- Katabi Ko'y Mamaw (1991) – Manny
- Gwapings: The First Adventure (1992)
- Hindi Kita Malilimutan (1993)
- Nang Iniwan Mo Ako (1997)
- Peque Gallaga's Scorpio Nights 2 (1999)
- Pinay Pie (2003)
- Reyna (2006)
- Sakal, Sakali, Saklolo (2007)
- Grandpa Is Dead (2009)
- Dilim (2014)
- Ang Probinsyano (2020)
- Makiling (2024)

=== As a director ===
- Gwapings Dos (1993)
- Shake, Rattle & Roll V (1994)
- April, May, June (1998)

=== As a writer ===
- Maalaala Mo Kaya (1997)
- Bahay ni Lola 2 (2005)

=== As a radio host ===
- Talakan (DZMM 630)
