= Balahibong Pusa =

Philippine drama film

- Directed by: Yam Laranas
- Screenplay by: Yam Laranas
- Story by: Jay Abello; Uro Q. Dela Cruz; Erik Matti; Mark Querubin
- Produced by: Vincent del Rosario III; Erik Matti
- Starring: Joyce Jimenez; Elizabeth Oropesa; Julio Diaz; Jay Manalo; Rica Peralejo
- Cinematography: Yam Laranas
- Edited by: Manet Dayrit
- Music by: Jessie Lasaten
- Production company: Viva Films
- Distributed by: Viva Films
- Release date: January 10, 2001
- Running time: 101 minutes
- Country: Philippines
- Language: Filipino

Balahibong Pusa is a 2001 Philippine neo noir crime drama film written, photographed, and directed by Yam Laranas on his directorial debut from a story concept developed by Jay Abello, Rosauro Q. Dela Cruz, Erik Matti, and Mark Querubin. The film stars Joyce Jimenez, Elizabeth Oropesa, Julio Diaz, Jay Manalo and Rica Peralejo.

== Plot ==
Sarah (Joyce Jimenez) is not fond of her mother Vivian's (Elizabeth Oropesa) suitor Michael (Julio Diaz). She goes to her boyfriend Nick (Jay Manalo) for comfort. However, the tension even worsens when Michael’s daughter Becky (Rica Peralejo) falls for Michael.

== Cast ==
- Joyce Jimenez as Sarah
- Elizabeth Oropesa as Vivian
- Julio Diaz as Michael
- Jay Manalo as Nick
- Rica Peralejo as Becky
- Josie Galvez as Yaya Aning
- R.J. Leyran as Dave
- Lucy Quinto as Land Lady
- Phillip Lazaro as Jewel
- Doming Olivar as Wilbert
- Jon Antonio as Jungkey
- Angel Barcena as Mang Angel
- George Shoemaker as Mang Toto
- Charisse Leviste as Tricia
- Jenny Velasco as Candy
- Ging Yambao as Printing Press Manager
- Carmen del Rosario as Mildred
- Malou Enero as Fatima

== Remake ==
The film had a remake which premiered via the digital streaming platform VMX on November 28, 2025. The film marked the screen debut of Margaret Diaz as Sarah while Mark Anthony Fernandez (Michael), Yda Manzano (Vivian), Itan Rosales (Nick) and Christine Bermas (Becky) completed the main cast. Roman Perez Jr. directed the movie.
