= Ang Mahiwagang Baul =

Philippine television drama series

- Title card
- Genre: Fantasy drama
- Starring: Eissen Bayubay; Sandy Talag; Carme Sanchez
- Country of origin: Philippines
- Original language: Tagalog
- No. of episodes: 74

Production
- Executive producer: Mona Coles Mayuga
- Camera setup: Multiple-camera setup
- Running time: 24–44 minutes
- Production company: GMA Entertainment TV

Original release
- Network: GMA Network
- Release: July 17, 2005 – January 28, 2007

Ang Mahiwagang Baul (transl. the enchanted chest) is a Philippine television drama fantasy anthology series broadcast by GMA Network. Starring Eissen Bayubay, Sandy Talag and Carme Sanchez, it premiered on July 17, 2005. The series concluded on January 28, 2007, with a total of 74 episodes.

The series features retelling popular Philippine myths, legends and folktales. It was originally slated for seven episodes, was later extended due to viewership ratings and feedback from the viewers. Some episodes were released on DVD by GMA Records and Home Videos in 2007 in three volumes. The series is streaming online on YouTube.

== Cast and characters ==
Main cast

- Eisen Bayubay as Epoy
- Sandy Talag as Jewel
- Carme Sanchez as Lola Tasya
- John Feir as Rextor

Recurring cast

- Shamaine Centenera as Lourdes
- Nonie Buencamino as Emil
- Bella Flores as Gelay
- Patricia Ysmael as Yayang
- Marian Rivera as Rahinda

== Accolades ==
Accolades received by Ang Mahiwagang Baul
Year	Award	Category	Recipient	Result	Ref.
2006	Catholic Mass Media Award	Best Children Show	Ang Mahiwagang Baul	Won	
2006	Anak TV Seal Awards	Child-Sensitive Program	Ang Mahiwagang Baul	Won	
2007	21st PMPC Star Awards for Television	Best Horror-Fantasy Program	Ang Mahiwagang Baul	Nominated	
