= Peque Gallaga's Scorpio Nights 2 =

1999 Filipino erotic thriller

- Directed by: Erik Matti
- Screenplay by: Lore Reyes; Erik Matti
- Story by: Peque Gallaga
- Produced by: Peque Gallaga (supervising); June T. Rufino (line)
- Starring: Albert Martinez; Joyce Jimenez
- Cinematography: Richard Padernal
- Edited by: Danny Gloria
- Music by: Jaime Fabregas
- Production companies: Neo Films; Serafim Productions
- Distributed by: Viva Films
- Release dates: January 16, 1999 (UP Film Center); February 2, 1999
- Country: Philippines
- Language: Filipino
- Box office: ₱80 million

Peque Gallaga's Scorpio Nights 2, or simply Scorpio Nights 2, is a 1999 Filipino erotic thriller film co-written and directed by Erik Matti in his directorial debut. A standalone sequel to Scorpio Nights (1985) -directed by Peque Gallaga-, it stars Albert Martinez and Joyce Jimenez and was produced by Neo Films in association with Serafim Productions. The film was released on February 2, 1999, and was a box office hit, grossing ₱80 million in its theatrical run.

== Plot ==
Andrew Sales is the epitome of a model teacher: decent, clean and good-natured among his peers and students. He also lives simply, preferring to live in a coed dormitory where he becomes a mentor and brother-figure for Cicero, the nerdy student who is often bullied by their dormmates. But when he crosses paths with Valerie, a student who lives at the same dorm, he starts to seduce her until they develop a secret relationship that changes everything. Andrew slowly loses his well-mannered nature, becomes irritable and neglects everything: his relationship with fellow teacher Dana, his responsibilities for Cicero, and the respect of his fellow teachers and students. He only finds solace when he fulfills his carnal needs towards Valerie.

Soon after, his affair was exposed when he was seen dating Valerie in a public place with a group of students. He was summoned by the college dean Beatrice who initially regrets looking up to him as a model teacher. The dean explained that there has been a moral decay in the school since the start of the year and they already lost one teacher (who turns out to be Andrew's teacher-confidante Butch) due to a scandal. Because of another scandal that brewed between Andrew and Valerie, Dean Beatrice had no choice but to release Andrew from his duties as a faculty member.

Andrew's termination from the school led to his break-up with Dana and majority of the dormmates slowly learned of his affair with Valerie. Without taking his side, they ostracized him while Valerie uses the victim card to gain sympathy. During a wild get-together between the male and female dormmates, Andrew disguised wearing a woman's dress and slowly creeps inside the dormitory where he finds Valerie and rapes her. He began to escape after the dormmates heard Valerie screaming in pain. He was able to go to his room to pack his belongings and escape but in an utter shock, he finds the hanging body of Cicero and instantly regrets for not being able to protect him. An angry mob of male and female dormmates later confronted Andrew about the rape but was also aghast when they found him hugging the dead body of Cicero, mistaking it for murder. Andrew was overpowered by the mob and was beaten to death. With his body later found at the creek, it was mistakenly reported by the media as a victim of salvage. The next day life goes on for everyone at the coed dormitory, including Valerie.

== Cast ==
- Albert Martinez as Andrew Sales
- Joyce Jimenez as Valerie Martin
- Daisy Reyes as Dana
- Janus del Prado as Cicero
- Manny Castañeda as Lota
- Bibeth Orteza as Dean Beatrice Catedral
- Jaime Fabregas as Butch Beltran
- Carmel Osmeña as Borinaga
- Luciano B. Carlos as Dr. Katigbak
- Cherry Pie Picache as Mona
- Mel Kimura as Coach Duds
- John Arceo as Bamboo
- Carlitos Abracia as Tootsie
- Maricor Fortun as librarian
- Gary Marzo as Eugene
- Roi Iranzo as Jacobo
- Nina Marcelo as Valerie's friend
- Jennifer Cabrales as Valerie's friend
- Erik Matti as Harold
- Tina Cuyugan as San Fidelis faculty member
- Ambeth Ocampo as San Fidelis faculty member
- Madie Gallaga as San Fidelis faculty member
- Uro dela Cruz as San Fidelis faculty member
- Hermie Go as San Fidelis faculty member
- Jeffrey Tam as male dormer
- Richard V. Somes (as Richard Somez) as male dormer
- Stella L. (as Ingrid Mendoza) as female dormer
- Lynn Matti as restaurant manager

== Production ==
Scorpio Nights 2 is Richard V. Somes' first film production, working as a propsman and a cast member ("male dormer").

The film is Erik Matti’s first directorial effort.

== Release ==
Prior to its release, Scorpio Nights 2 was twice given an "X" rating by two separate subcommittees of the Movie and Television Review and Classification Board (MTRCB), which would have prevented the film from being exhibited in public. When the rating was appealed before the Malacañang Appeals Committee, headed by Fr. Sonny Ramirez, the film's X rating was removed.

Scorpio Nights 2 held a special screening at the University of the Philippines Film Center in Quezon City on January 16, 1999, which was noted to have been a chaotic event, with the theater filled to capacity with students; Frank Mallo of Malaya noted that a second screening was set in the evening after numerous people were not able to enter the theater for the first screening. The film began its general theatrical release on February 2, 1999.

The film was later screened at the Paris Autumn Film Festival in September 2001.

=== Box office ===
Scorpio Nights 2 was a success at the box office, grossing at least ₱60 million by March 1999 and ₱80 million by the end of its theatrical run.

== Accolades ==
Group	Category	Recipient(s)	Result	Ref(s).
18th FAP Awards	Best Editing	Danny Gloria	Nominated	
23rd Gawad Urian Awards	Best Cinematography	Richard Padernal	Nominated	

== Sequel ==
A standalone sequel titled Peque Gallaga's Scorpio Nights 3, directed by Lawrence Fajardo, was released through Viva Entertainment's streaming platform Vivamax (now VMX) in July 2022.
