= Mosang =

Filipina actress

- Born: Maria Alilia Bagio; April 21, 1972 (age 54); Manila, Philippines
- Occupation: Actress
- Years active: 1997–present

Maria Alilia Bagio (born April 21, 1972), known professionally as Mosang (Tagalog: [ˈmɔsɐŋ]), is a Filipino actress. She is widely known for portraying supporting roles, such as maids and vendors, in many films, including Ded na si Lolo (2009), T2 (2009), and Segunda Mano (2011). She gained wider recognition after appearing in the television sitcom Pepito Manaloto as Baby since 2010.

== Life and career ==
Mosang grew up in Tondo, Manila; she has one son, Elijah. She has a business of eatery, where her capital came from her earnings from her appearance in a soft drink commercial. With the help of director Wenn Diramas, she has appeared in several films and television series, known for her portrayals of maids and midwives. She also stated that she values each project given to her and acknowledges that there are no small roles in the entertainment industry.

She made her early appearances as a supporting role in the series Esperanza in 1998, portraying Yaya Caring. Mosang is widely recognized for her portrayal as Baby Reyes in the Philippine sitcom Pepito Manaloto (2010–present). She appeared in many other shows in GMA Network.

== Filmography ==
=== Films ===
Year	Title	Role
2003	Mr. Suave	
2005	D' Anothers	Lotus Feet
2009	Ded Na Si Lolo	Kapitana
2009	T2	Manghihilot
2009	Ang Darling Kong Aswang	Bebang
2010	Bulong	Morette
2011	Segunda Mano	Manang Letty
2012	Amorosa	Florida
2013	Pagpag: Siyam na Buhay	Ningning
2014	Third Eye	Aludia
2014	Shake, Rattle & Roll XV	Saleslady
2017	18 Gays of Power	Aling Miranda
2024	My Future You	Berns

=== Television ===
Year	Title	Role	Note(s)
1997	Wansapanataym		Episode: "Patay-patayan, Buhay-buhayan"
1998	Esperanza	Yaya Caring	
1999	Wansapanataym		Episode: "Angel Felice"
2000	Pangako Sa 'Yo	Doray	
2000	Maalaala Mo Kaya	Maid	Episode: "Apron"
2000	Wansapanataym		Episode: "Ang Cross-Stitch ni Lola Amelia"
2006	Gulong ng Palad	Belen	
2008–2009	Luna Mystika	Piryang	
2009	Stairway to Heaven	Madam Violet	
2009	Adik Sa'Yo	Yaya Mila	
2010	Endless Love	Christine Santos	
2010	The Last Prince	Uruja	
2010–2011	Bantatay	Nurse	
2010–present	Pepito Manaloto	Bettina "Baby" Reyes	
2011	Futbolilits	Beauty Dimagiba	
2012	Hindi Ka Na Mag-iisa	Betty	
2013	Kakambal ni Eliana	Tetay	
2015	Because of You	Yaya Malou	
2015	Healing Hearts	Vegetable Vendor	
2015	The Rich Man's Daughter	Maid	
2015	Once Upon a Kiss	Mimay	
2017	Tadhana	Edna	Episode: "Dream House"
2018	Sherlock Jr.	Nene	
2019	Daig Kayo ng Lola Ko	Tita	Episode role
2019	Dragon Lady	Young Doray Orosco	
2021	Stories From The Heart	Corazon "Nay Cora" Santos	Episode: "Never Say Goodbye"
2022	Raya Sirena	Matet	
2022	Widows' Web	Delia Gonzales	
2023	Mga Lihim ni Urduja	Mimang	
2023	Tadhana	Aunor	Episode: "Penitensya"
2024	Makiling	Kapitana	
