= I Left My Heart in Sorsogon =

Philippine television drama series

- Title card
- Genre: Romantic drama
- Created by: Jojo Tuwasil Nones
- Written by: John Roque; Mark Duane Angos; Liberty L. Trinidad; Ma. Christina S. Velasco
- Directed by: Mark Sicat dela Cruz
- Creative director: Aloy Adlawan
- Starring: Heart Evangelista; Richard Yap; Paolo Contis
- Theme music composer: Garrett Bolden
- Opening theme: "Our Love" by Garrett Bolden
- Country of origin: Philippines
- Original language: Tagalog
- No. of episodes: 65

Production
- Executive producer: Michele Robles Borja
- Production locations: Sorsogon; Metro Manila
- Editors: Robert Ryan Reyes; Noel Mauricio
- Camera setup: Multiple-camera setup
- Production company: GMA Entertainment Group

Original release
- Network: GMA Network
- Release: November 15, 2021 – February 11, 2022

I Left My Heart in Sorsogon is a Philippine television drama romance series broadcast by GMA Network. Directed by Mark Sicat dela Cruz, it stars Heart Evangelista, Richard Yap and Paolo Contis. It premiered on November 15, 2021 on the network's Telebabad line up. The series concluded on February 11, 2022, with a total of 65 episodes.

The series is streaming online on YouTube.

== Cast and characters ==
Cast

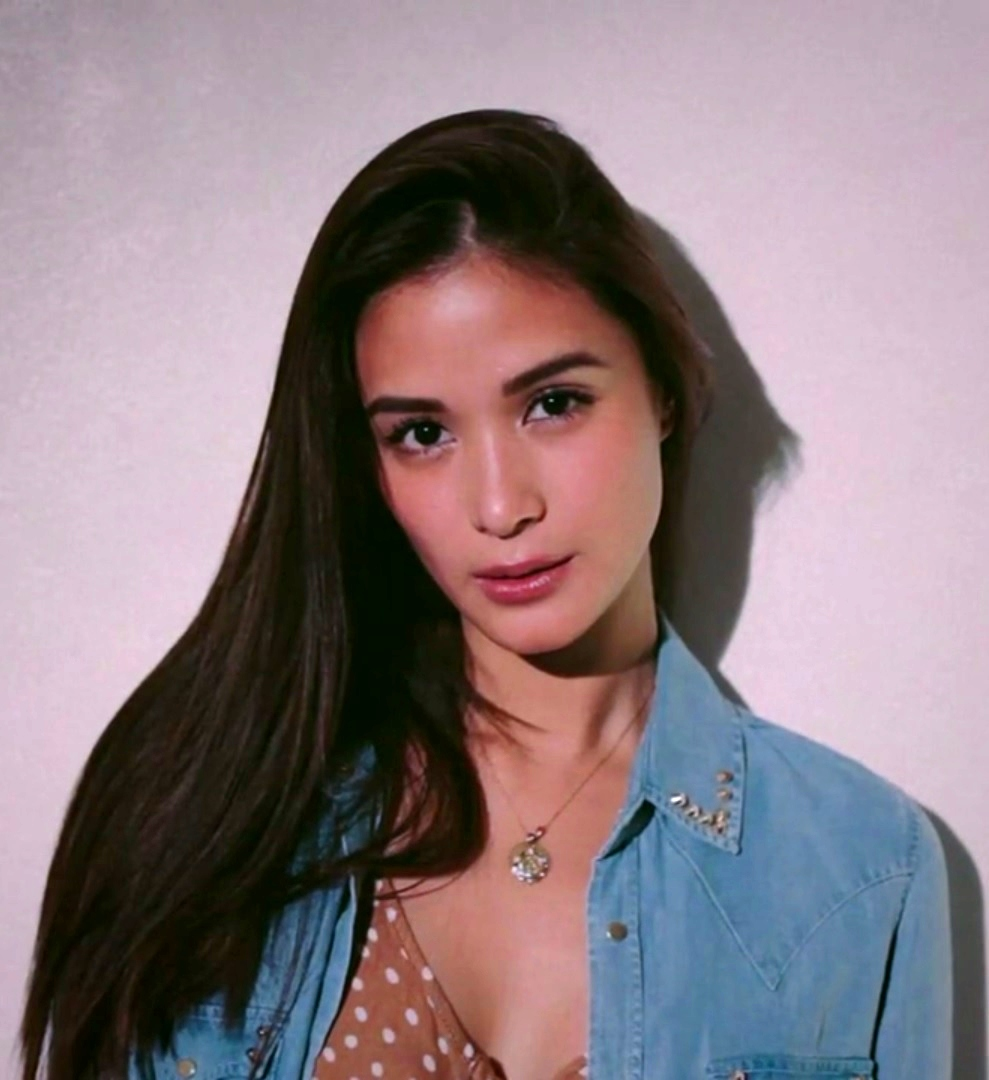
Heart Evangelista

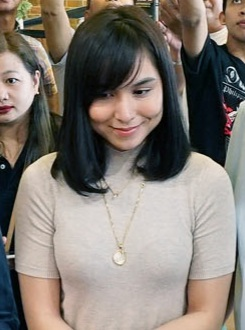
Kyline Alcantara

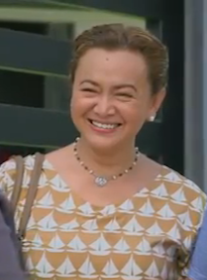
Sharmaine Buencamino

Lead cast

- Heart Evangelista as Celeste Diesta
- Richard Yap as Antonio "Tonito" Wenceslao III
- Paolo Contis as Michael Angelo "Mikoy" Macedonio

Supporting cast

- Kyline Alcantara as Tiffany "Tiff" Wenceslao
- Mavy Legaspi as Sebastian "Basti" Estrellado
- Rey Abellana as Patricio Estrellado
- Shamaine Buencamino as Isadora "Adora" Estrellado
- Isay Alvarez as Lucinda Diesta-Estrellado
- Marina Benepayo as Vivian Wenceslao
- Debraliz Valasote as Ericka "Ikay" Macedonio
- Michelle Dee as Hazelyn "Hazel" Pangan
- Issa Litton as Aurelia Limjoco
- Jennie Gabriel as Mylene "May-May" Regor
- Jeniffer Maravilla as Jamaica Figueroa
- Zonia Mejia as Claudette "Clau" Pangan
- Elias Point as James Figueroa
- Victor Sy as Winston Wenceslao

Guest cast

- Bryce Eusebio as younger Mikoy
- Dayara Shane as younger Celeste

== Production ==
Principal photography commenced in Sorsogon on July 19, 2021.

== Ratings ==
According to AGB Nielsen Philippines' Nationwide Urban Television Audience Measurement People in television homes, the pilot episode of I Left My Heart in Sorsogon earned a 12.1% rating. The final episode scored a 13.6% rating.
