= Nuts Entertainment =

Philippine television sketch comedy show

- Title card
- Also known as: Nuts Entertainment It's Playtime
- Genre: Sketch comedy
- Directed by: Soxie Topacio
- Presented by: Joey de Leon; Janno Gibbs; Anjo Yllana
- Country of origin: Philippines
- Original language: Tagalog
- No. of episodes: 608

Production
- Executive producer: Joshua de Guzman
- Camera setup: Multiple-camera setup
- Running time: 45 minutes
- Production company: GMA Entertainment TV

Original release
- Network: GMA Network
- Release: April 30, 2003 – December 27, 2008

Nuts Entertainment is a Philippine television sketch comedy show broadcast by GMA Network. Starring Joey de Leon, Janno Gibbs and Anjo Yllana, it premiered on April 30, 2003 on the network's KiliTV line up. The show concluded on December 27, 2008, with a total of 608 episodes.

== Cast ==
Cast

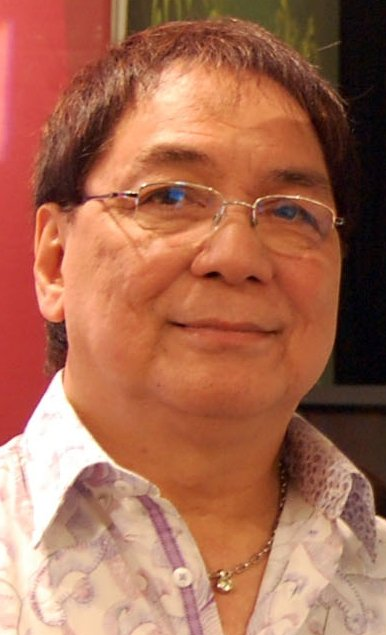
Joey de Leon

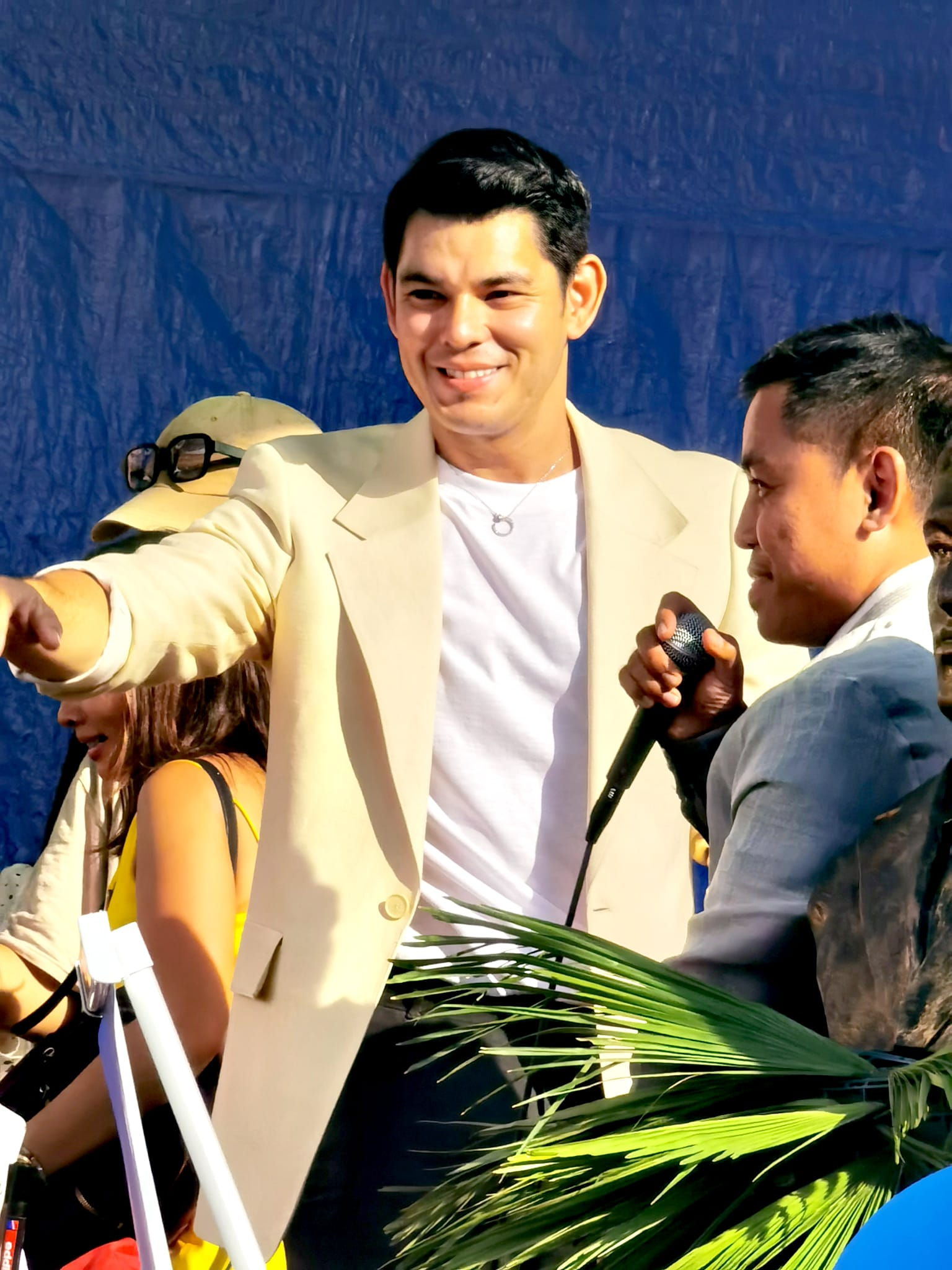
Richard Gutierrez

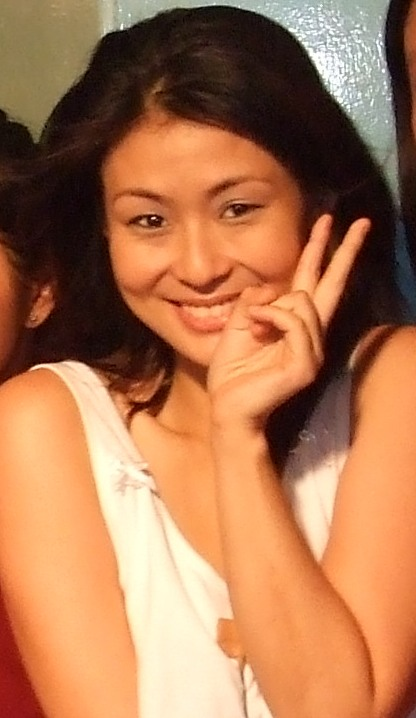
Iwa Moto

Lead cast

- Joey de Leon
- Janno Gibbs
- Anjo Yllana

Supporting cast

- Richard Gutierrez (2003–08)
- Pekto (2003–08)
- John Feir (2004–08, also the show's associate producer)
- Iwa Moto (2006–08)
- Alfred Vargas (2007–08)
- Ehra Madrigal (2007–08)
- Keempee de Leon (2008)
- Ariel Villasanta (2008)
- Maverick Relova (2008)
- Baba Gee (2006–08)
- Peejay
- Rufa Mi (2007)
- MC (2007)
- Anne Curtis (2003–04)
- Joyce Jimenez (May–July 2007)
- Gelli de Belen (2003–07)
- Carmina Villarroel (2003–07)
- Sherwin Ordoñez (2003–07)
- Brad Turvey (2003–07)
- Aleck Bovick (2003–04)
- Greg Turvey (2003–04)
- Jacky Woo (2008)

== Accolades ==
Accolades received by Nuts Entertainment
Year	Award	Category	Recipient	Result	Ref.
2005	Golden Screen TV Awards	Outstanding Comedy Gag Show	Nuts Entertainment	Nominated	
2007	21st PMPC Star Awards for Television	Best Gag Show	Nuts Entertainment	Nominated	
2007	21st PMPC Star Awards for Television	Best Comedy Actor	Joey de Leon	Nominated	
2008	22nd PMPC Star Awards for Television	Best Gag Show	Nuts Entertainment	Nominated	
2008	22nd PMPC Star Awards for Television	Best Comedy Actor	Joey de Leon	Nominated	
2009	23rd PMPC Star Awards for Television	Best Gag Show	Nuts Entertainment	Nominated	
2009	23rd PMPC Star Awards for Television	Best Comedy Actor	Joey de Leon	Nominated	
