= Brad Turvey =

Filipino television actor

- Born: March 10, 1978 (age 48); Hong Kong
- Occupations: Actor, video jockey
- Years active: 2003–2006

Brad Turvey (born 10 March 1978) is an Australian actor and video jockey of Channel [V] International.

== Early life ==
Brad Turvey and his twin brother Greg Turvey were born on 10 March 1978 in Hong Kong (then a British territory) to a late Scottish Australian father and a Chinese mother who grew up in Australia. Brad and Greg Turvey grew up in Australia. Both Brad and Greg settled in the Philippines in 2001. Brad was the first to earn an acting role, first in the Penshoppe commercial with U.S. diva Ms. Mandy Moore. He also sang the chorus line of Mandy Moore's song Cry: "In places no one will find". Based on that appearance, he was discovered by Philippine TV station GMA Network as a contract actor. At GMA, he was a TV host for the Sunday noontime show SOP and one of the original members of Nuts Entertainment with his twin brother. While hosting SOP, he auditioned at Channel V as a video jockey and TV host and was hired. He also became a contract actor for Regal Films, but wasn't offered any movie roles.

After leaving showbusiness, he went back to Australia with his mother to join Greg. He opened a restaurant "Knox Dining" at Surfers Paradise, Gold Coast, where he married Adelle Shea and had a son named Bailey.

== Filmography ==
=== Television ===
- Kahit Kailan (2002–2004)
- Love to Love (2004)
- Nuts Entertainment (2004–2006)
- Encantadia (2005)

=== Movies ===
- Pinay Pie (2003)
- Lovestruck (2005)
- Eternity (2006)
