= Biyaheng Langit =

2000 Filipino romantic comedy film

- DVD Sleeve
- Directed by: Tikoy Aguiluz
- Screenplay by: Ianco Dela Cruz; Rey Ventura
- Story by: Tikoy Aguiluz; Miranda Medina-Bhunjun
- Produced by: Vic del Rosario Jr.
- Starring: Mark Anthony Fernandez; Joyce Jimenez
- Cinematography: Romulo Araojo
- Edited by: Mirana Medina-Bhunjun
- Production company: Viva Films
- Release date: October 25, 2000
- Running time: 110 minutes
- Country: Philippines
- Language: Filipino

Biyaheng Langit is a 2000 Filipino romantic comedy film directed by Tikoy Aguiluz. The film is set in a casino and stars Joyce Jimenez and Mark Anthony Fernandez.

The film is also known as Paradise Express.

== Synopsis ==
Bea, a young Filipino-American wants to raise money, so she can move back to the United States and live independently. She follows her grandmother to the casino where she meets Danny, a casino runner and they beat everything they have hoping to win big money. Unfortunately, the two loose all their life savings and go on hiding where they experience the gritty lives of the urban poor.

== Cast ==
- Joyce Jimenez as Bea
- Mark Anthony Fernandez as Danny
- Susan Africa as Koring
- Christian Alvear as Tinga
- John Arcilla as Berto
- Nida Blanca as Amor
- Vangie Labalan as Auntie
- R.J. Leyran as Solomon
- Bembol Roco as Bossing
- Shermaine Santiago as Amanda
- Onyok Velasco

== Rating ==
The Movie and Television Review and Classification Board (MTRCB), like previous Jimenez starrers Scorpio Nights 2 and Warat, gave the film an "X" rating for gratuitous love scenes. The film, which was meant to be Fernandez's comeback movie, was later allowed by the MTRCB to be screened.

== Accolades ==
The film was nominated for six Gawad Urian Awards in 2001, including best director for Aguiluz, best screenplay, cinematography, editing, production design and sound, but did not win.

The film was internationally screened in April 2001 at the Far East Festival in Udine, Italy.
