= Watta Job =

Philippine television infotainment show

- Title card
- Genre: Infotainment
- Written by: Joseph Balboa
- Directed by: Rico Gutierrez
- Presented by: Chris Tiu; Heart Evangelista; John Feir
- Country of origin: Philippines
- Original language: Tagalog
- No. of episodes: 14

Production
- Executive producer: Agnes Suriaga
- Camera setup: Multiple-camera setup
- Running time: 45 minutes
- Production company: GMA Entertainment TV

Original release
- Network: GMA Network
- Release: November 17, 2012 – February 16, 2013

Watta Job is a Philippine television infotainment show broadcast by GMA Network. Hosted by Chris Tiu, Heart Evangelista and John Feir, it premiered on November 17, 2012 on Sabado Star Power line up. The show concluded on February 16, 2013, with a total of 14 episodes.

== Overview ==
Hosts

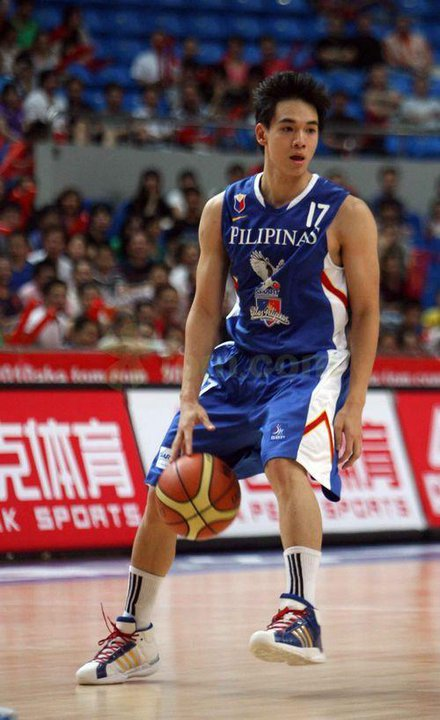
Chris Tiu

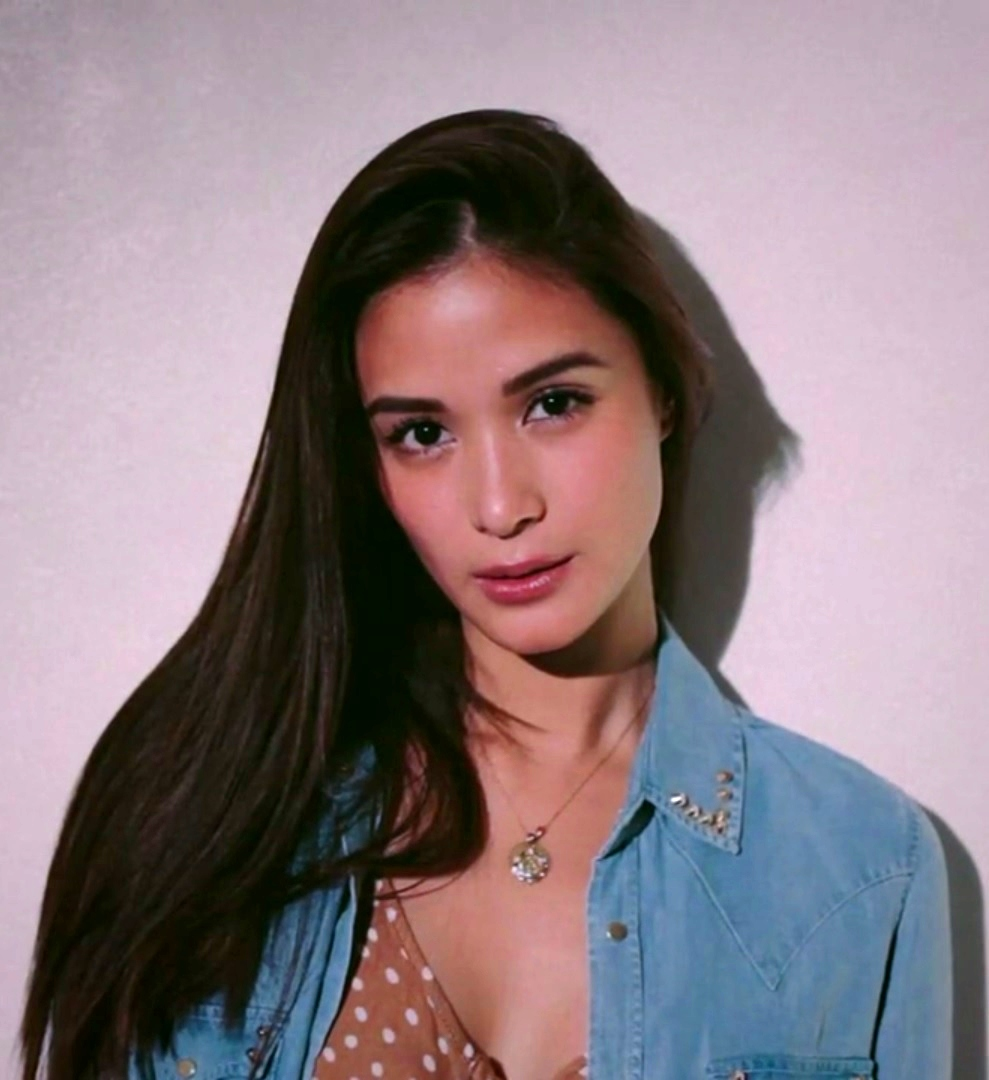
Heart Evangelista

The show featured hosts Chris Tiu, Heart Evangelista, and John Feir interviewing Filipinos with odd and unique occupations and trying out the jobs themselves. The show used material from the Canadian show Powers in Motion.

== Ratings ==
According to AGB Nielsen Philippines' Mega Manila household television ratings, the pilot episode of Watta Job earned a 14.7% rating.
