= Forever (Philippine TV series) =

2013 Philippine television drama series

- Title card
- Genre: Drama; Romantic fantasy
- Developed by: Kit Villanueva Langit
- Written by: Tina Samson Velasco; Angeli Delgado
- Directed by: Ricky Davao
- Starring: Heart Evangelista; Geoff Eigenmann; Gloria Romero
- Theme music composer: Rico J. Puno
- Opening theme: "Together Forever" by Janno Gibbs and Rocco Nacino
- Country of origin: Philippines
- Original language: Tagalog
- No. of episodes: 63

Production
- Executive producer: Kaye Atienza Cadsawan
- Production locations: Laguna, Philippines; Manila, Philippines
- Cinematography: Chiqui Soriano
- Camera setup: Multiple-camera setup
- Running time: 30–45 minutes
- Production company: GMA Entertainment TV

Original release
- Network: GMA Network
- Release: January 21 – April 19, 2013

Forever is a 2013 Philippine television drama romance fantasy series broadcast by GMA Network. Directed by Ricky Davao, it stars Heart Evangelista, Geoff Eigenmann and Gloria Romero. It premiered on January 21, 2013 on the network's Telebabad line up. The series concluded on April 19, 2013, with a total of 63 episodes.

The series is streaming online on YouTube.

== Cast and characters ==
Cast

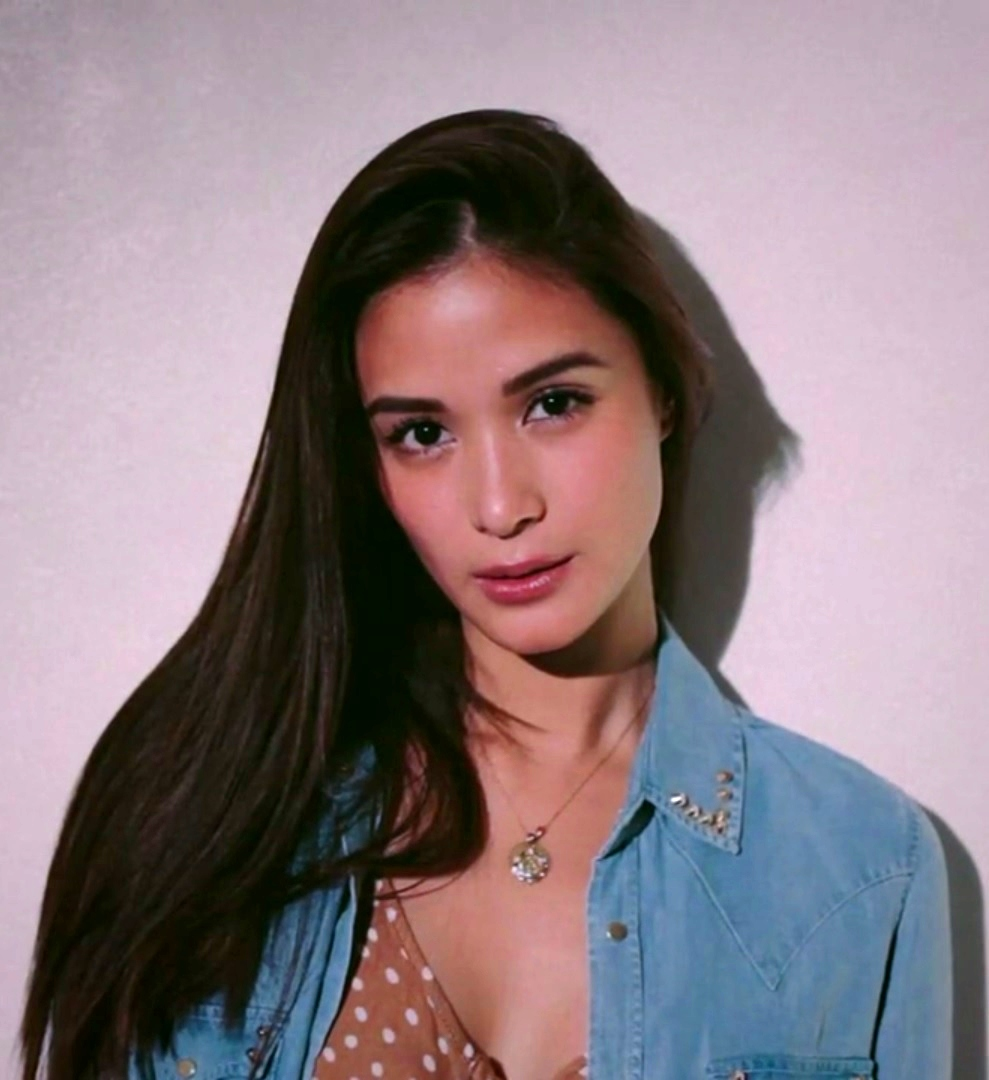
Heart Evangelista

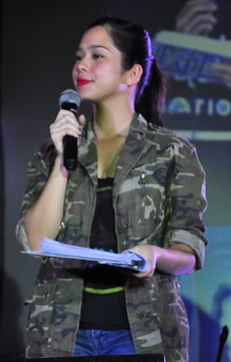
Saab Magalona

Lead cast

- Heart Evangelista as younger Adora Del Prado / Isadora
- Gloria Romero as older Adora Del Prado
- Geoff Eigenmann as Ramon / Patrick

Supporting cast

- Isabel Oli as Monica del Prado
- Gian Magdangal as Rico Gallardo III
- Candy Pangilinan as Susie
- Saab Magalona as Leila

Guest cast

- Marc Abaya as Federico Gallardo
- Ernie Zarate as older Federico Gallardo
- Ronnie Henares as Jaime Del Prado
- Angie Ferro as Apeng
- Rox Montealegre as Maggie
- Dex Quindoza as Jason
- Roldan Aquino as Barabas
- Carme Sanchez as Kate

== Development ==
Writer, director and GMA Entertainment TV head, Jun Lana began conceptualizing the series early 2012 and intended to be the initial offering of the network's for their coveted Afternoon Prime block for 2013. The series is, somewhat, based on the 1980 classic film Somewhere in Time and in 2006 GMA Films' Moments of Love, because of its fictitious "Love knows no boundaries" and "time warf" plot. The network's entertainment TV department approved the concept and found the story "something new" for an afternoon show to feature a period piece.

== Production ==
Principal photography concluded on April 8, 2013.

== Ratings ==
According to AGB Nielsen Philippines' Mega Manila household television ratings, the pilot episode of Forever earned a 15.3% rating. The final episode scored a 12.4% rating.
