= Joyce Jimenez =

Philippine actress (born 1978)

- Born: Joyce Herrin Reintegrado; October 19, 1978 (age 48); Los Angeles, California, U.S.
- Occupation: Actress
- Years active: 1996–2008
- Spouse: Paul Ely Egbalic (m. 2008)
- Children: 3

Joyce Herrin Reintegrado-Egbalic (born March 21, 1978), popularly known by her screen name Joyce Jimenez is an American-born Filipino former actress.

In the early 2000s, Joyce Jimenez was dubbed "Pantasya ng Bayan" (The nation's fantasy) after doing sexploitation films that did well at the box office under Viva Films, when she worked with serious actors such as Richard Gomez, Albert Martinez and Jomari Yllana, later on in romantic comedies with Piolo Pascual and Diether Ocampo under Regal Films. In 2003, she was cast in Pinay Pie with Ai-Ai delas Alas and Assunta De Rossi under Star Cinema on her second film with Jose Javier Reyes after her pairing with Aga Muhlach in Narinig Mo Na Ba ang L8est?.

== Biography ==
Joyce Jimenez was born in Los Angeles, California to Philippine migrant parents. Her full name is Joyce Herrín Reintegrado-Egbalic. Jimenez grew up in the Los Ángeles area where she studied at Bishop Amat High School in La Puente, California. She was accepted at UCLA but decided to forgo schooling to move to the Philippines; most recently she had a college degree from a university in Australia.

In 1996, Jimenez participated in the Miss Taguig - Hollywood pageant. Although she did not win the title, she did win the Miss Photogenic title.

Jimenez started to venture out from films and into business. She owns Skin-Private Joyce, which specializes in bath and beauty products. She also opened a lingerie line Private Joyce Intimate Collection partnership with Ever Bilena Cosmetics Inc. Jimenez married Filipino-American Paul Ely Egbalic from Vallejo, CA on August 23, 2008, at Walnut, California and on October 16, 2009, Joyce & Paul welcomed their first baby girl named "Jorja".

On September 29, 2008, Jimenez suffered serious injuries in a car accident in Urdaneta City, Pangasinan (coming from a Baguio taping for ABC TV5's "Philippines Scariest Challenge"). Avoiding a truck, her Toyota 4Runner flipped four times and was totally wrecked when it rolled over in a rice field. She was treated at the Urdaneta City Sacred Heart Hospital and transferred to Medical City, Pasig. Her legs were badly injured, she had minor bruises, had to wear a brace on her neck, and had minor stitches on her face.

After her retirement in film and her regular television work for GMA Network at the time, she decided to go back to Los Angeles after marrying and starting a family. Her Ever Bilena brand Private Joyce disbanded in 2006.

== Filmography ==
=== Film ===
Year	Title	Role
1997	Dahil Tanging Ikaw	Cutie
1997	Boy Buluran: Headhunter ng Maynila	
1997	Boy Chico: Hulihin... Ben Tumbling	Edna
1997	Duplikado	Irma
1997	Trabaho Lang, Dear (Walang Personalan)	Sexy girl
1997	Habang Nasasaktan, Along Tumatapang	Special participation
1997	Takot Ako Sa Darling Ko	
1999	Sumigaw Ka Hanggang Gusto Mo!	Dorothy
1999	Peque Gallaga's Scorpio Nights 2	Valerie Martin
1999	Warat	Rica
1999	Bilib Ako Sa'yo	Varga
1999	Linlang	Jill
2000	Biyaheng Langit	Bea
2001	Balahibong Pusa	Sarah
2001	Harold Robbins' Body Parts	Ines
2001	Ano Bang Meron Ka?	Carol
2001	Narinig Mo Na Ba ang L8est	Gina
2001	Blades of the Sun	
2002	I Think I'm in Love	Kaye
2002	Ang Galing Galing Mo, Babes	Babes
2002	Lapu-Lapu	Bulakna
2003	Pinay Pie	Karen
2004	Sex in Philippine Cinema	
2005	Birhen ng Manaoag	

=== Television ===
Year	Title	Role
1998	Halik sa Apoy	Trixie
2001–02	Da Boy En Da Guard	
2002	Maalaala Mo Kaya: "CD"	
2002–03	Da Pilya En Da Pilot	
2005	Magpakailanman	Herself
2006	Da Adventures of Pedro Penduko	Consehal Lino's wife
2007	Lupin	Courtney Amor
2007–2008	Nuts Entertainment	Herself

== Awards ==
Year	Award-Giving Body	Category	Work	Result
2001	Guillermo Mendoza Memorial Scholarship Foundation	Ms. RP Movies		Won
