= Adik Sa'Yo =

2009 Philippine television drama series

- Title card
- Also known as: Love Games
- Genre: Drama; Romantic comedy
- Created by: Denoy Navarro-Punio
- Directed by: Joel Lamangan; Lore Reyes
- Starring: Jolina Magdangal; Jennica Garcia; Dennis Trillo; Marvin Agustin
- Theme music composer: Rico Blanco
- Opening theme: "Hinahanap-Hanap Kita" by Dennis Trillo
- Ending theme: "Hinahanap-Hanap Kita" by Jolina Magdangal
- Country of origin: Philippines
- Original language: Tagalog
- No. of episodes: 70

Production
- Executive producer: Helen Rose S. Sese
- Production locations: Metro Manila, Philippines; Batangas, Philippines
- Camera setup: Multiple-camera setup
- Running time: 30–45 minutes
- Production company: GMA Entertainment TV

Original release
- Network: GMA Network
- Release: June 8 – September 11, 2009

Adik Sa'Yo (transl. addicted to you / international title: Love Games) is a 2009 Philippine television drama romantic comedy series broadcast by GMA Network. Directed by Joel Lamangan and Lore Reyes; it stars Jolina Magdangal, Jennica Garcia, Dennis Trillo and Marvin Agustin. It premiered on June 8, 2009, on the network's Telebabad line up. The series concluded on September 11, 2009, with a total of 70 episodes.

The series was released in DVD by GMA Records.

== Cast and characters ==
Cast

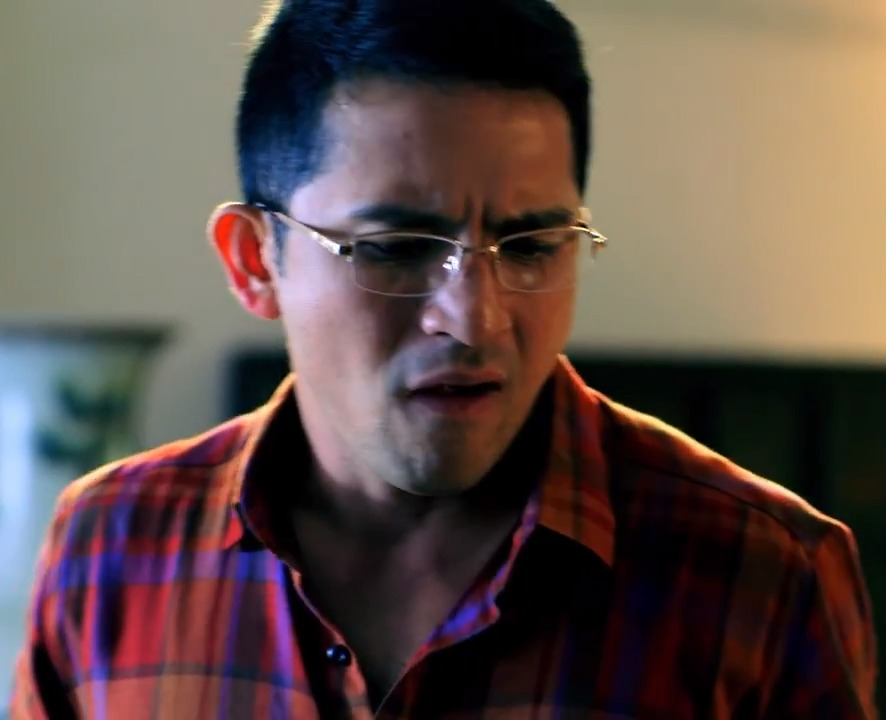
Dennis Trillo

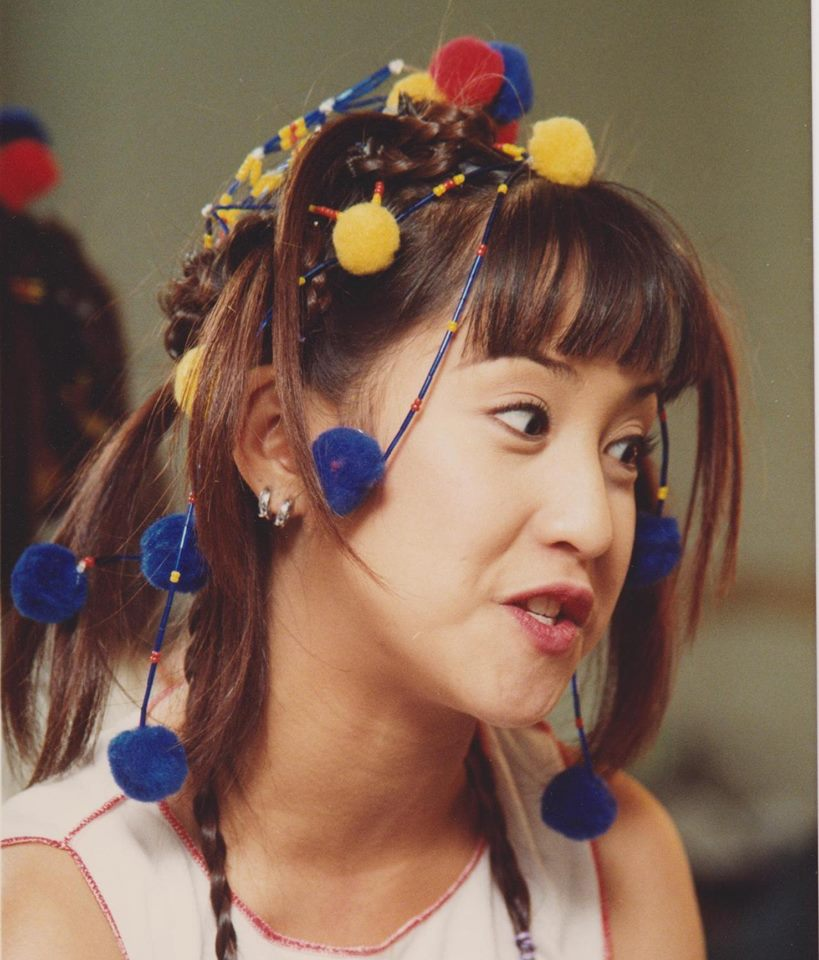
Jolina Magdangal

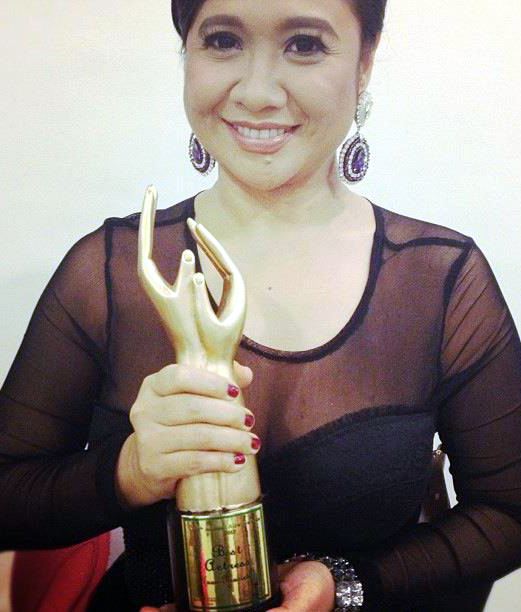
Eugene Domingo

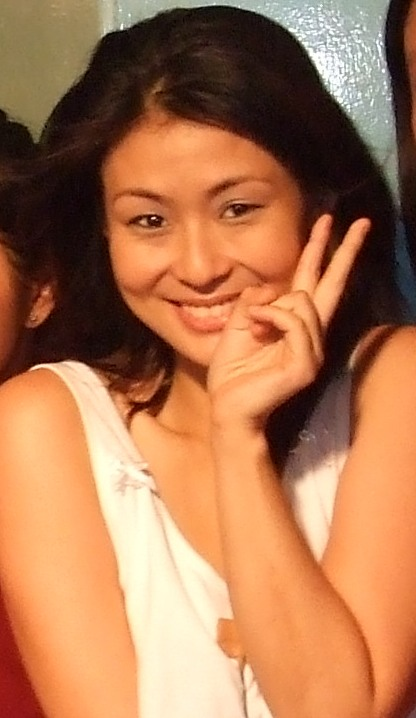
Iwa Moto

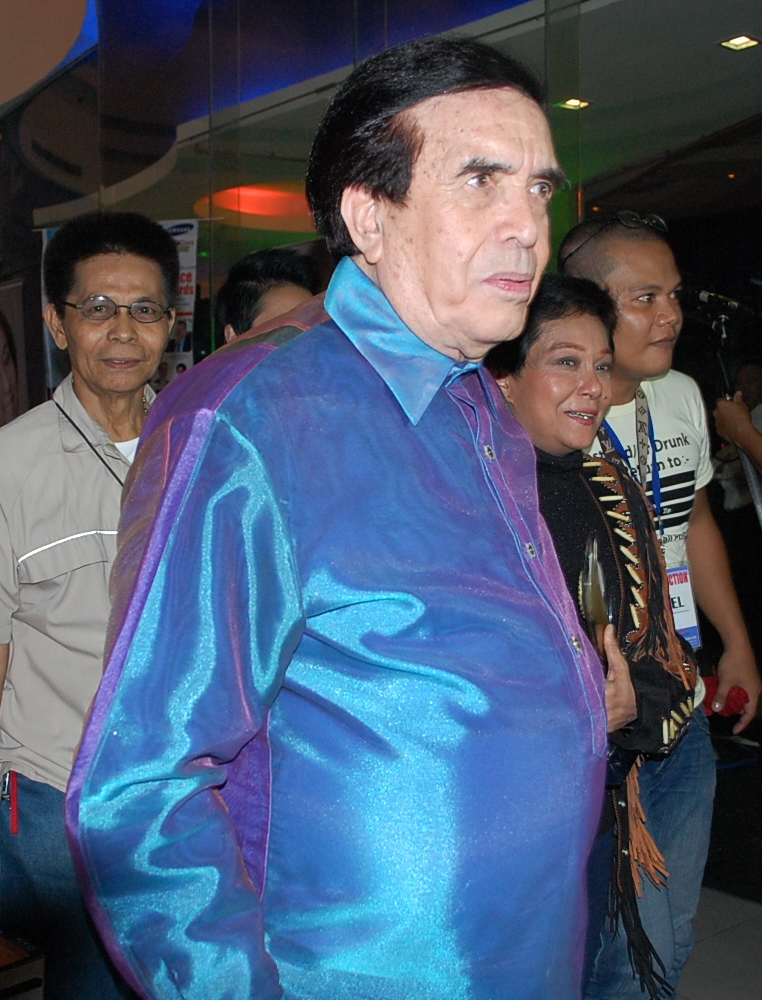
German Moreno

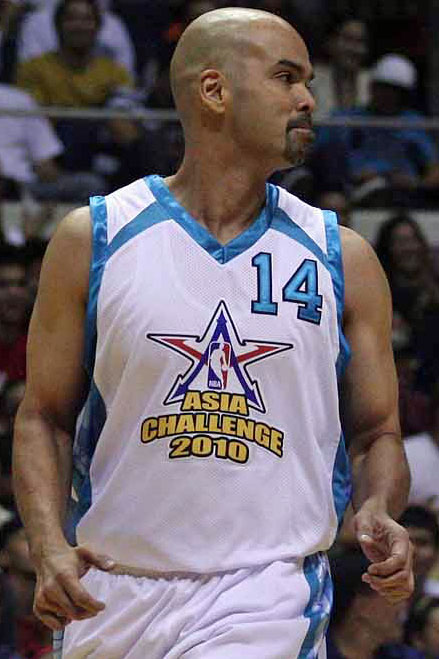
Benjie Paras

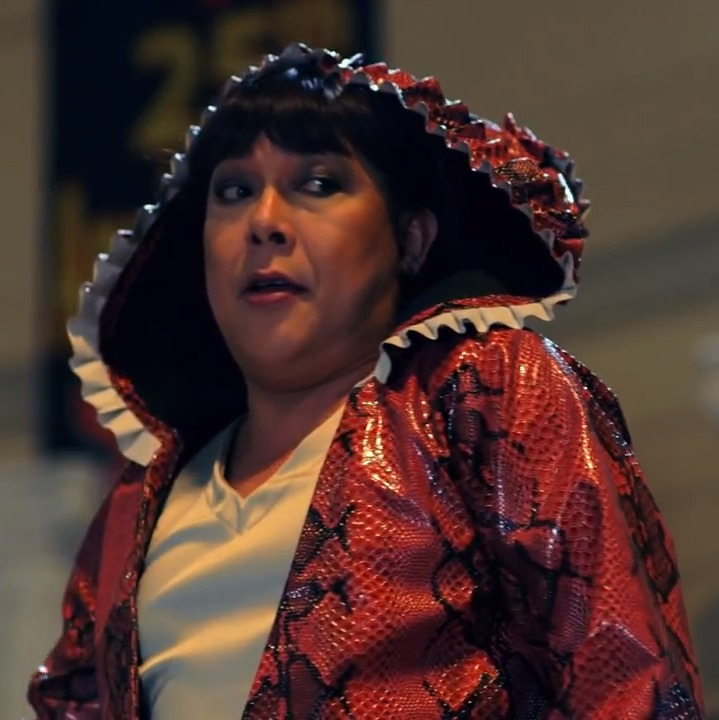
John Lapus

Lead cast

- Jolina Magdangal as Joanna Maglipot (Lindenberg)
- Marvin Agustin as Carlos Manansala
- Dennis Trillo as Ruben Domingo
- Jennica Garcia as Karen Maglipot

Supporting cast

- Elizabeth Oropesa as Stella Maglipot
- Joey Marquez as Luigi Maglipot
- Eugene Domingo as Fatima Lindenberg
- Chanda Romero as Aurora Manansala
- Pauleen Luna as Camille Sickat
- Chariz Solomon as Emelene Santos
- Benjie Paras as Benjo
- Iwa Moto as Andrea
- German Moreno as Joe
- Tony Mabesa as Samuel
- Luz Valdez as Caring Domingo
- Ces Quesada as Ising Domingo
- Vaness del Moral as Racquel Domingo
- John Lapus as July
- Sandy Talag as Ria Domingo
- Jim Pebanco as Roman
- Mosang as Mila
- Renerich Ocon as Penelope

Guest cast

- Wendell Ramos as James
- Chynna Ortaleza as Liza
- Isabel Granada as Doy
- Dang Cruz as Estrelita
- Polo Ravales as himself
- SexBomb Girls as themselves
- Yassi Pressman as Lucinda Bartolome
- Mang Enriquez as Katong
- Dinky Doo as Dodong
- Rosemarie Sarita as Matilda
- Raquel Villavicencio as Mercy

== Production ==
Principal photography commenced on May 5, 2009.

== Ratings ==
According to AGB Nielsen Philippines' Mega Manila household television ratings, the pilot episode of Adik Sa'Yo earned a 25.4% rating. The final episode scored a 34.1% rating.
