= Dwarfina =

2011 Philippine television drama series

- Title card
- Genre: Drama; Romantic fantasy
- Written by: Aloy Adlawan; Maridas Garbes-Severino; Agnes Gagelonia Uligan; Michiko Yamamoto
- Directed by: Mike Tuviera
- Creative director: Jun Lana
- Starring: Heart Evangelista
- Theme music composer: Toto Sofioso
- Opening theme: "Tangi Kong Hiling" by Julie Anne San Jose
- Country of origin: Philippines
- Original language: Tagalog
- No. of episodes: 83

Production
- Executive producer: Michele R. Borja
- Production locations: Metro Manila, Philippines; Santa Maria, Bulacan, Philippines
- Editors: Virgilio Custodio; Eddie Esmedia; Noel S. Mauricio II
- Camera setup: Multiple-camera setup
- Running time: 19–37 minutes
- Production company: GMA Entertainment TV

Original release
- Network: GMA Network
- Release: January 10 – May 6, 2011

Dwarfina is a 2011 Philippine television drama romance fantasy series broadcast by GMA Network. Directed by Mike Tuviera, it stars Heart Evangelista in the title role. It premiered on January 10, 2011 on the network's Telebabad line up. The series concluded on May 6, 2011, with a total of 83 episodes.

The series is streaming online on YouTube.

== Cast and characters ==
Cast

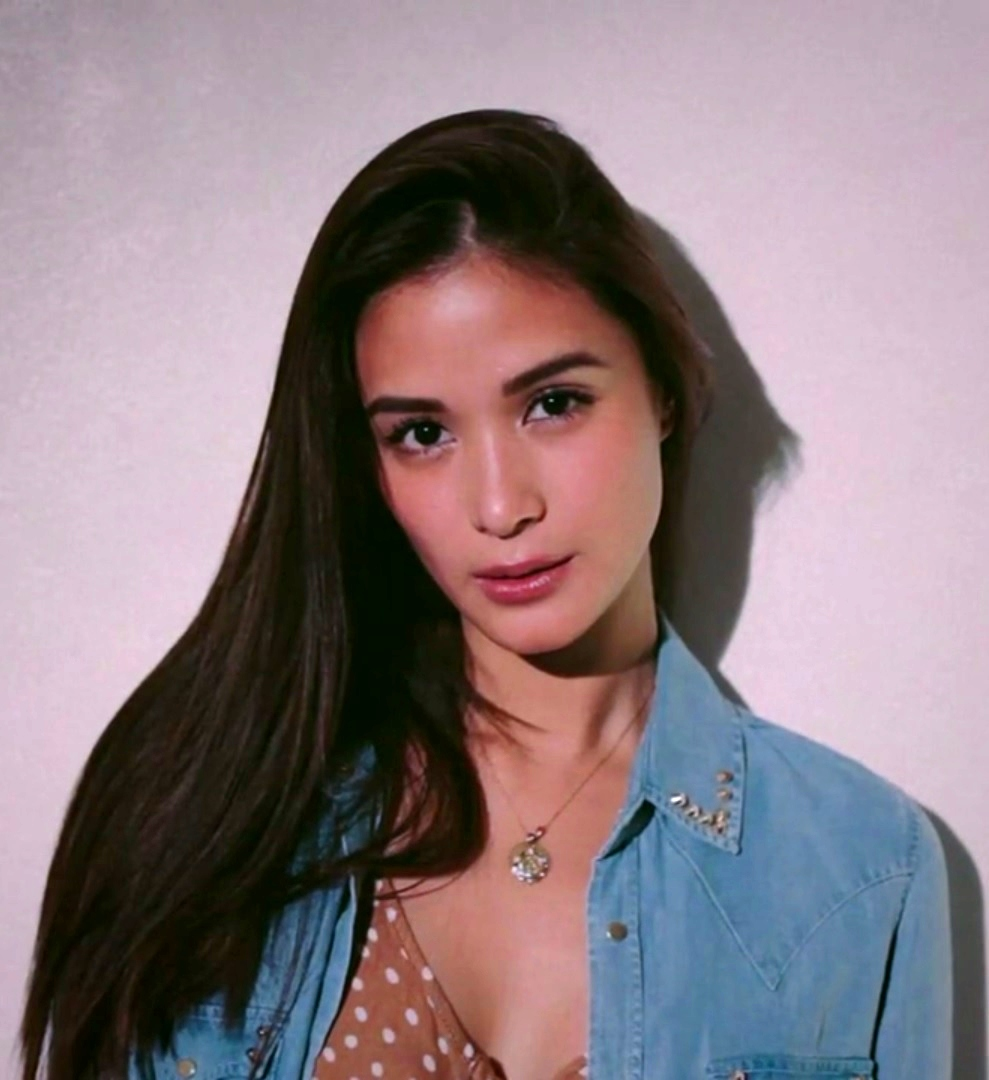
Heart Evangelista

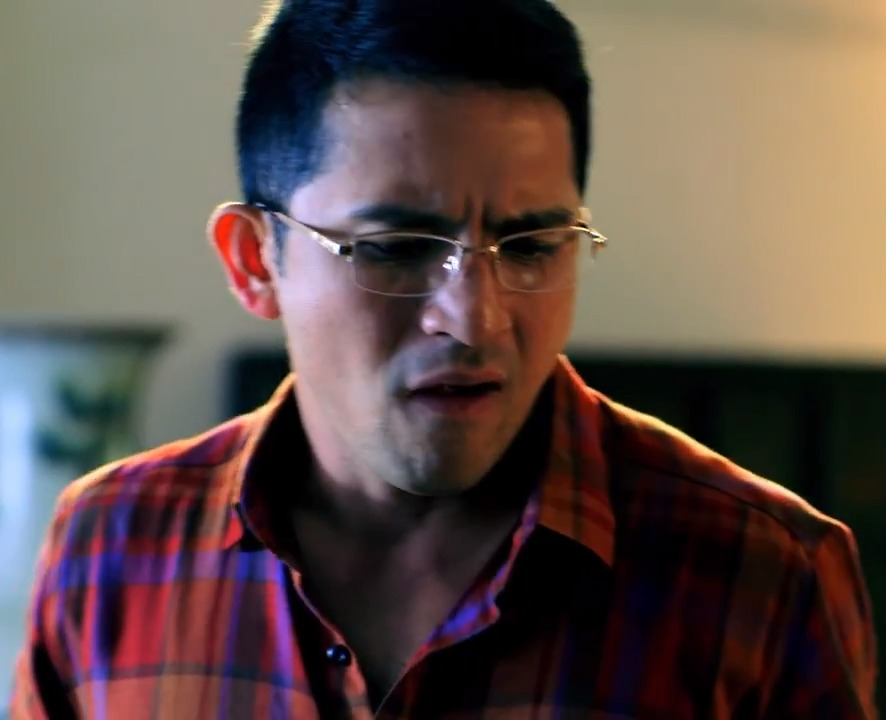
Dennis Trillo

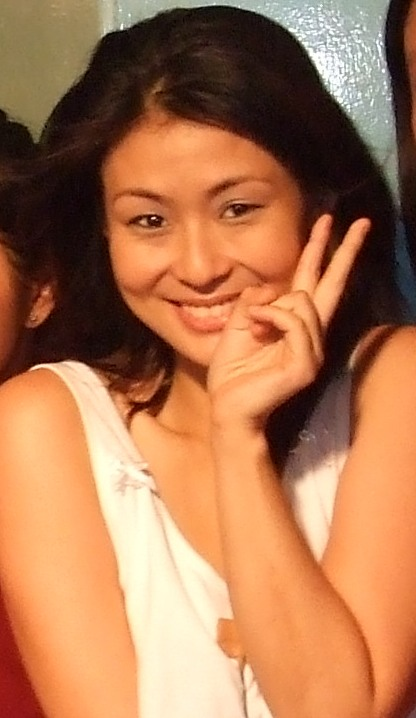
Iwa Moto

Lead cast

- Heart Evangelista as Dwarfina / Yna / Fina

Supporting cast

- Dennis Trillo as Lyndon
- Janice de Belen as Marissa
- Cris Villanueva as Kardo
- Chanda Romero as Selya
- Mark Bautista as Estong
- Iwa Moto as Lucille
- Kylie Padilla as Chloe
- Derrick Monasterio as Darius
- Yogo Singh as Buddy
- Jestoni Alarcon as Dito Calixto
- Jackie Lou Blanco as Dita Aviana
- Angelika Dela Cruz as Romera
- Emilio Garcia as Hulyanto
- Pauleen Luna as Gwendina
- Tony Mabesa as Nuno Umberto
- Will Devaughn as Elvin
- Gerard Pizarras as Marcell
- Bearwin Meily as Willy
- Vaness del Moral as Kamila
- Mico Aytona as Dwentukin
- Leah Scarlet Boises as Hilda

Guest cast

- Lani Mercado as Andrea
- Glenda Garcia as Susan
- John Apacible as Andong
- Lloyd Samartino as Orland
- Junyka Santarin as younger Fina / Dwarfina
- Nathaniel Britt as younger Lyndon
- Christine Joy De Guzman as younger Lucille
- Scott Murthy McKenzel as younger Elvin
- Jhiz Deocardez as younger Dwentukin
- Edelweise Tuaven as younger Gwendina
- Princess Gamboa as younger Dita
- Lala Tan as younger Kamila
- Bella Flores as Flora
- Jaya as Lelang Gorya
- Fabio Ide as Dwenstein / Dwendelstilskin
- Sheena Halili as Sabrina
- Rufa Mae Quinto as Dwenkikay

== Production ==
Principal photography commenced in December 2010.

== Ratings ==
According to AGB Nielsen Philippines' Mega Manila People/Individual television ratings, the pilot episode of Dwarfina earned a 15.4% rating.
