= Heart Evangelista =

Filipina actress (born 1985)

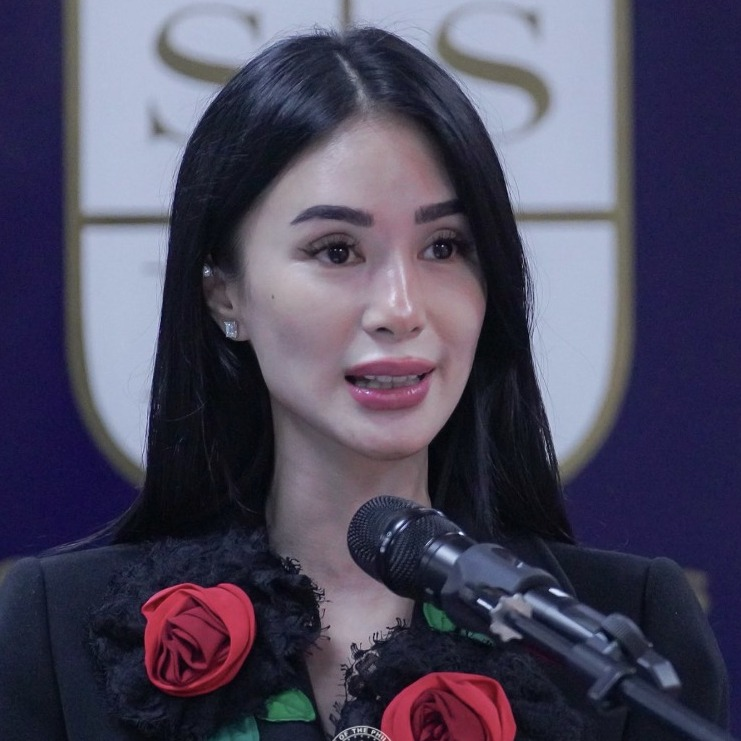
- Evangelista in 2025
- Born: Love Marie Payawal Ongpauco; February 14, 1985 (age 41); Manila, Philippines
- Occupations: Actress; singer; model; endorser; visual artist; businesswoman; VJ; host
- Years active: 1998–present
- Agents: Star Magic (1998–2008) Sparkle GMA Artist Center (2008–present); Viva Artists Agency (2012–present)
- Spouse: Francis Escudero (m. 2015)
- Relatives: Salvador Escudero (father-in-law); Evelina Escudero (mother-in-law); Dette Escudero (sister-in-law); Jodi Sta. Maria (cousin)
- Website: lovemarieescudero.com

Love Marie Payawal Ongpauco-Escudero (born February 14, 1985), known professionally as Heart Evangelista, is a Filipino actress, television host, advocate, and entrepreneur. She is the second wife of politician Francis Escudero (his first marriage was annulled in 2011).

== Early life ==
Evangelista was born as Love Marie Payawal Ongpauco on February 14, 1985, in Manila, Philippines. She is the last child of businessman Reynaldo Evangelista Ongpauco and Maria Cecilia del Gallego Payawal. Her Chinese-Filipino family founded the Barrio Fiesta chain of Filipino restaurants and her mother's family owns a sugar plantation in Camarines Sur. She is a second cousin of actress Jodi Sta. Maria. Her family moved to San Francisco during her early years – before returning to the Philippines in her early teens.

Evangelista attended Colegio de San Agustin (CSA) in Makati upon returning to the Philippines. She enrolled in ABS-CBN's Distance Learning Center. Her nickname "Heart" originated from her birthday on Valentine's Day. She adopted Heart Evangelista as her screen name in the late 1990s.

== Career ==
=== 1998–2008: Star Magic ===
Evangelista joined Star Magic's Star Circle Batch 9 in 1999 when she was thirteen. She made her television debut in 2000 as part of the ABS-CBN series G-mik!, where she played the role of Missy. Her G-mik! role earned her a PMPC Star Award for Best New Female TV Personality in 2001. Evangelista and her love team partner John Prats starred in teen-focused programs like G-mik! and Berks, and co-hosted the variety show ASAP.

Evangelista and John appeared in My First Romance (2003), a two-part film. She had supporting roles in the comedy Ang Tanging Ina (2003) and the romance Bcuz of U (2004) with Geoff Eigenmann. In 2004, she and Eigenmann joined the television drama Hiram alongside Kris Aquino and Anne Curtis, for which she received a nomination for Best Drama Actress. Around the same time, Evangelista became a video jockey for the music channel Myx.

In 2005, Evangelista took on the lead role of Eden in ABS-CBN's fantasy-action series Panday, starring opposite Jericho Rosales. In 2006, Evangelista left Star Magic and signed a contract with Manila Genesis Entertainment under Angeli Pangilinan-Valenciano, the wife of singer Gary Valenciano and the sister of Senator Kiko Pangilinan. In 2007, she ended her stint as a VJ on Myx. She starred in a television adaptation of the 1992 drama film Hiram na Mukha, again opposite Geoff Eigenmann. She was in Pangarap na Bituin, andYour Song under the title "Muntik Na Kitang Minahal". In 2008, Evangelista left ABS-CBN.

=== 2008–present: GMA Artist Center ===
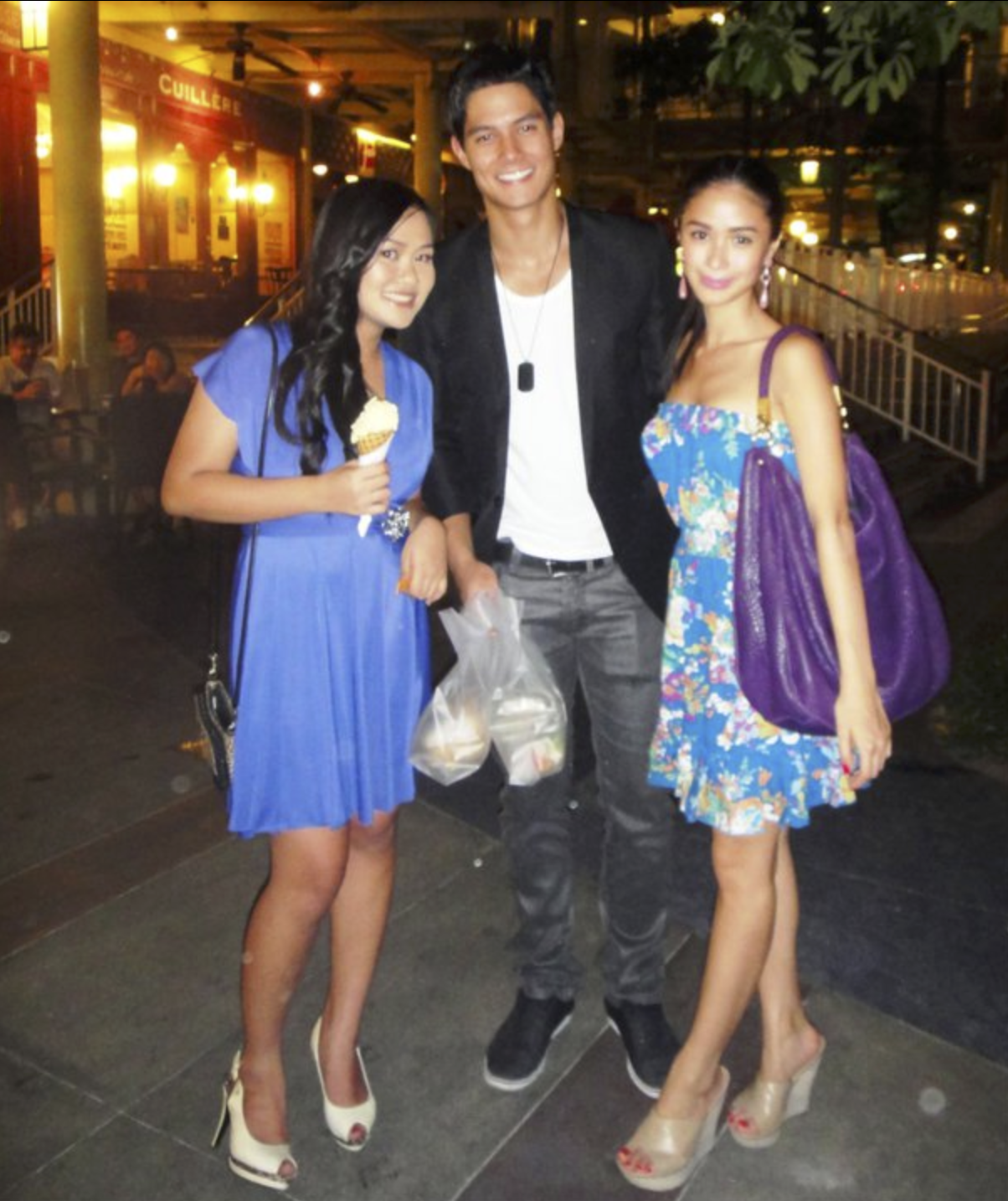
Evangelista (right) with Daniel Matsunaga (center) and Jonha Richman (left) in 2011

In early 2008, Evangelista signed a two-year exclusive contract with the GMA Network through the GMA Artist Center. Under the management of her father, Rey Ongpauco, and Annabelle Rama. She started her first show Codename: Asero as the leading lady of Richard Gutierrez.

She played one of the twins in the fantaserye Luna Mystika and in the first afternoon TV soap Sine Novela: Ngayon at Kailanman until 2009. She appeared in a TV series, Full House, Party Pilipinas, Puso ng Pasko: Artista Challenge and in Dwarfina.

In 2012, she starred in the TV series Legacy, the afternoon drama Forever and in Luna Blanca Book 3 till its finale. In 2013, she was reunited with De Rossi in the Afternoon soap Magkano Ba ang Pag-ibig? under the direction of Maryo J. de los Reyes. In 2015, she and Legacy co-star Lovi Poe were reunited in the soap Beautiful Strangers, a melodrama. This was Evangelista's second time working with veteran actress Dina Bonnevie in a series with a huge ensemble cast. In 2016, she was reunited with Dwarfina co-star Dennis Trillo in the primetime rom-com Juan Happy Love Story. In September 2016, Evangelista experienced a series of depression after the passing of her mentor and 'close friend', former senator Miriam Defensor Santiago.

In 2017, Evangelista starred in Mulawin vs. Ravena. She also starred in My Korean Jagiya, paired with former U-KISS member Alexander Lee. The show aired with a total of 105 episodes.

In 2019, she served as a judge on the seventh season of the reality talent television show StarStruck. Evangelista then portrayed a Sorsogon fashion designer and socialite Celeste in the television drama romance series I Left My Heart in Sorsogon (2021–2022). She also appeared in the series Bling Empire.

In August 2023, Evangelista renewed her exclusive contract with GMA Network.

In 2024, Evangelista will star as Mei in upcoming film Infamous 6 directed by Anthony Hickox.

== Visual artist ==
Evangelista held solo exhibitions showcasing her artworks, where she used, Love Marie as her artist name. Her first solo exhibition was held at the Ayala Museum in 2014, entitled I am Love Marie: The Art and Works of Love Marie Ongpauco. In the same year, she participated in the Visual Arts Festival through the Focus on the Arts: Art in Transit exhibitions. She also held her second solo exhibition in the same year at Galerie Joaquin through her Love Marie gallery. Her third solo exhibition, Love Marie: A Solo Exhibition of a World-Class Filipina, was held at the Raffles Hotel's Chan Hampe Galleries in Singapore in 2015.

In 2016, she collaborated with designer Mark Bumgarner through the LMxMB: when art meets fashion, as well as with A.A. Patawaran for his book HaiNAku and other poems. In the same year, Evangelista launched her fourth solo exhibition titled Oceans Apart held at the Ayala Museum. Her hand-painted bags were also introduced in the same year at BMW BGC through her exhibition, Carry your heART. In 2017, she collaborated again with A.A. Patawaran for the HaiNAku 1st Anniversary Exhibit at the S Maison Conrad Hotel in Manila. She also held HEART & Style, a public exhibition of her works of art at the Fashion Hall of SM Megamall. In April 2018, she launched another art exhibit at ArtistSpace Gallery of Ayala Museum. In the same year, she partnered with A.A. Patawaran for his book, Manila Was A Long Time Ago, which featured her pet dog named Panda. Her Follow Your Heart artwork was featured in the February 2019 US edition of Harper's Bazaar.

In 2021, Evangelista collaborated with Incubus lead vocalist Brandon Boyd for Moonlight Arts Collective, an organization founded by Boyd himself showcasing art by various cultural icons that moonlight as visual artists. Called Neon People, their first collaboration was released in July 2022. In 2023, Evangelista dropped her solo print debut of her artwork, Love's First Bloom, on Moonlight Arts Collective.

== Fashion ==
Heart Evangelista is regarded by the media as a fashion icon. In 2017, Evangelista attended Paris Fashion Week for the first time and was present at notable fashion houses like Schiaparelli, Georges Hobeika, Giambattista Valli, Elie Saab, Ulyana Sergeenko, Ralph & Russo, and Zuhair Murad. In 2018, Crazy Rich Asians author Kevin Kwan invited her to be part of Harper's Bazaar's The Real Crazy Rich Asians feature highlighting "Asian style icons shaking up the world of couture." Afterwards, Evangelista became a staple at fashion week, attending shows in Paris, New York, and Milan by top designers like Dior, Chanel, Louis Vuitton, Yves Saint Laurent, Fendi, Gucci, Versace, Dolce & Gabbana, Balmain, among others. In the same year, she was selected as the spokesperson for the Spring Summer 2019 collection of the French label Sequoia.

In 2021, Evangelista was announced as a face of the French luxury bag brand Lancaster, alongside Barbara Palvin. Evangelista was also one of the 25 worldwide personalities selected for Salvatore Ferragamo's Silk Your Style campaign.

Heart Evangelista has been featured on the covers of various East Asian magazines, including Harper's Bazaar Singapore, Harper's Bazaar Indonesia, Vogue Philippines, L'Officiel Philippines, Tatler Philippines, and ICON Singapore. She has dedicated features in Vogue Singapore, Vogue Thailand, Harper's Bazaar Taiwan, and Harper's Bazaar Singapore.

== Other ventures ==
Evangelista has authored two books: This is Me, Love Marie, a beauty book published in 2015, and Styled with Heart, a fashion book published in 2019. Evangelista is the co-founder and co-CEO of Pure Living, a beauty and wellness company. She is also a co-owner of Harlan Beach Resort in Boracay.

== Charities and advocacies ==
=== Charities ===
Her foundation Heart Can aims to help children with respiratory diseases. Evangelista also supports the Balikatan Thalassemia for children with rare diseases, Corridor of Hope for children with cancer, and the Cerebral Palsy Association of Sorsogon. In 2024, as her husband, senator Francis Escudero, was elected as the new Senate President, Evangelista assumes the position as the head of Senate Spouses Foundation.

=== Advocacies ===
Evangelista is an LGBT ally and a recipient of Lagablab Network's Equality Champion Award. During the 2018 State of the Nation Address in the Philippine Congress

Evangelista is also a spokesperson for PAWS or (Philippine Animal Welfare Society) and Have a Heart for Aspins campaign. Evangelista also advocates for mental health.

== Personal life ==
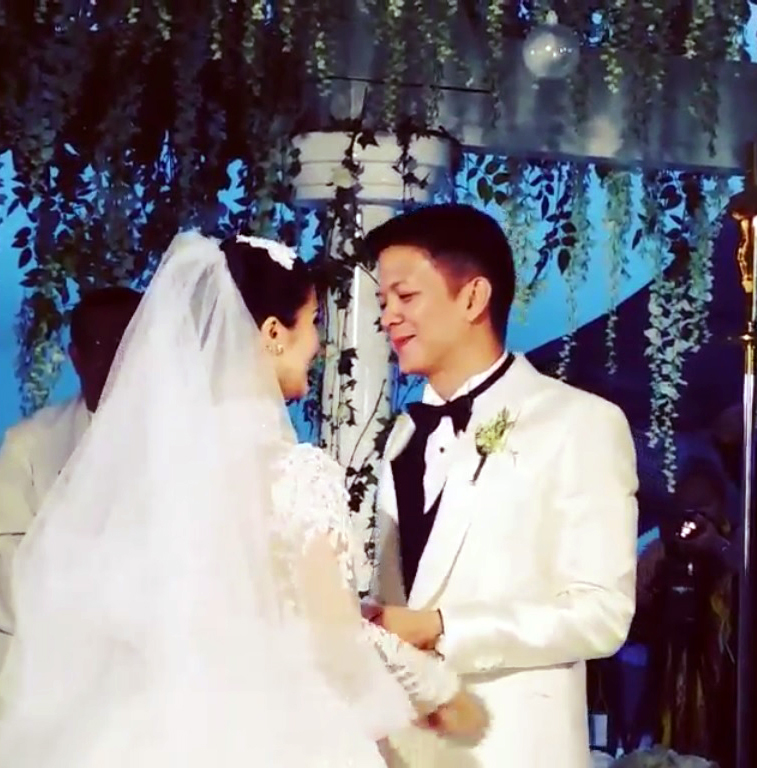
Evangelista and Escudero's wedding at the Balesin Island Club in February 2015

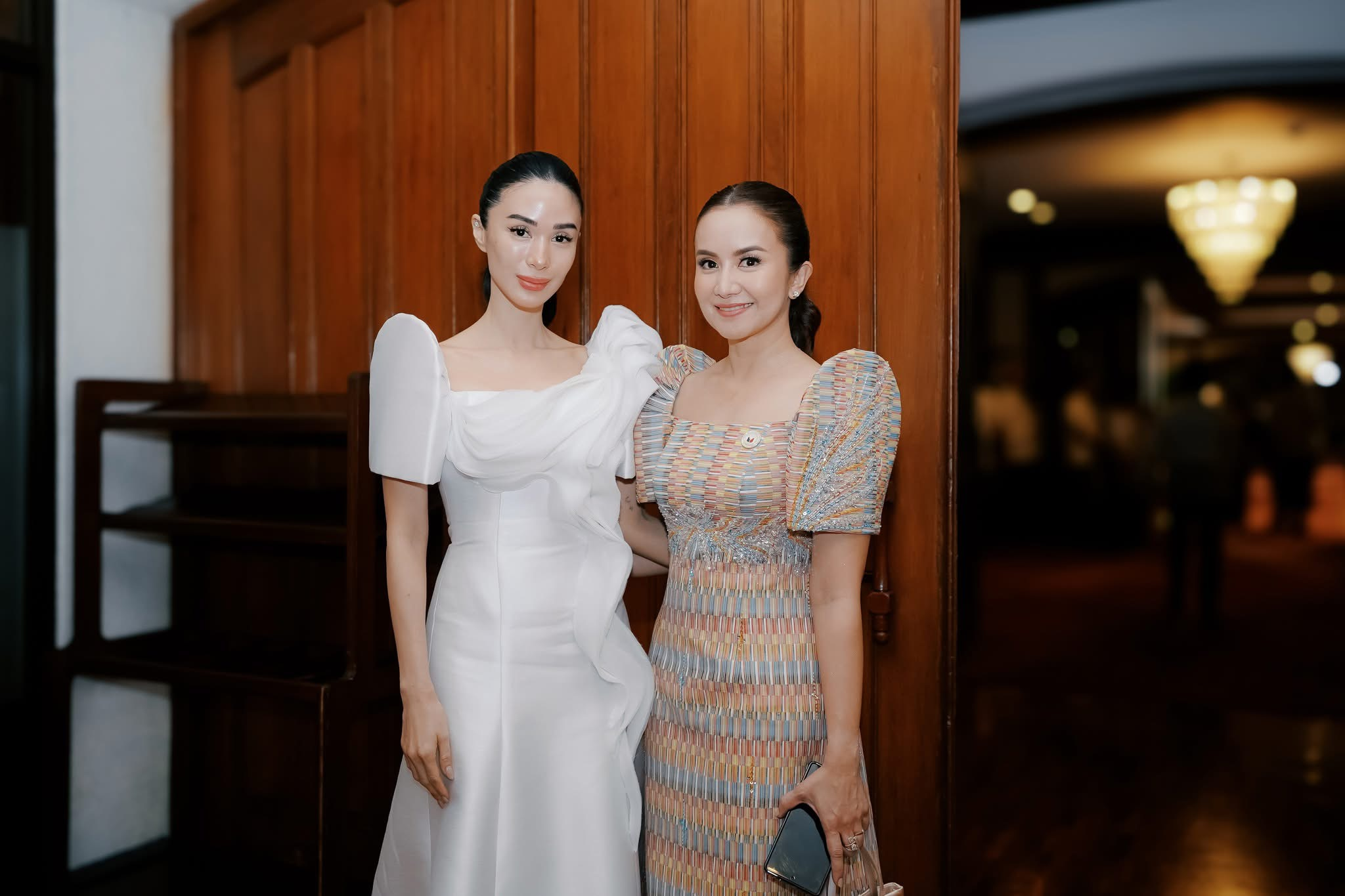
Evangelista with her sister-in-law, Sorsogon's 1st district congresswoman Dette Escudero, on the sidelines of the 2025 State of the Nation Address

Evangelista is the second wife of Senate President Francis Escudero co-parenting Escudero's fraternal twins, Quino and Chesi, She assumed the role of first lady of Sorsogon province from 2019, until her husband was elected Governor of Sorsogon.

Evangelista revealed losing another baby after the 2018 miscarriage of her twins, adding that she had named her unborn daughter "Sophia Heart". Evangelista had a fourth miscarriage.

== Filmography ==
=== Film ===
| Year | Title | Role |
|---|---|---|
| 2001 | Trip | Faye |
| 2002 | Jologs | Pedestrian (cameo) |
| 2003 | My First Romance | Jackie Ocampo |
| 2003 | Ang Tanging Ina | Portia "Por" Montecillo |
| 2004 | Bcuz of U | Cara |
| 2008 | Ay, Ayeng | Ayeng |
| 2009 | Nobody, Nobody But... Juan | Young Aida |
| 2009 | Mano Po 6: A Mother's Love | Stephanie Uy |
| 2010 | Tingala sa Pugad | Aileen |
| 2010 | Inno Sotto's Muse | |
| 2011 | Joey Gosiengfiao's Temptation Island | Virginia P. |
| 2012 | Sosy Problems: It Girls Just Wanna Have Fun | Claudia Ortega |
| 2014 | Trophy Wife | Gwen |
| 2014 | Fairy Tail the Movie: Phoenix Priestess | Lucy Heartfilia (voice) |
| 2015 | Felix Manalo | Cristina Villanueva-Manalo |
| 2019 | Fairy Tail: Dragon Cry | Lucy Heartfilia (voice) |
| 2023 | The Wedding Hustler | Heart |

=== Television ===
| Year | Title | Role | Notes |
|---|---|---|---|
| 2000–2002 | G-mik! | Missy Sandejas | |
| 2001 | Da Pilya en Da Pilot | Heart | |
| 2001 | Maalaala Mo Kaya | Irene Acosta | Episode: "Exchange Gift" |
| 2001 | Maalaala Mo Kaya | Jenny Castaneda | Episode: "Burda" |
| 2001–2008 | ASAP | Herself (Co-host, performer) | |
| 2002 | Maalaala Mo Kaya | | Episode: "Sanggol" |
| 2002–2003 | Arriba, Arriba! | Monina Arriba | |
| 2002–2004 | OK Fine, 'To ang Gusto Nyo! | Yoko | |
| 2002–2004 | Berks | Gwyneth | |
| 2002–2007 | Myx | Herself | Video jockey |
| 2003 | Maalaala Mo Kaya | Dianne | Episode: "Ferry Boat" |
| 2003 | Maalaala Mo Kaya | Lei | Episode: "Flat Tire" |
| 2003 | Heart Evangelista 18th Birthday Special | Herself | Documentary |
| 2003 | Tara Tena: Share A Home, Share A Heart | Anna | |
| 2003 | Wansapanataym Presents: Thumbgelina | Liit / Laki / Angelina / Thumbgelina | |
| 2003–2005 | Ang Tanging Ina | Portia "Por" Macaspac | |
| 2004–2005 | Hiram | Margaret Benipayo | |
| 2004–2006 | ASAP Fanatic | Herself (Co-host) | |
| 2005 | Ang Panday: Book 1 | Eden Roxas | |
| 2005 | Maalaala Mo Kaya | Emily Roxas | Episode: "Painting" |
| 2005–2006 | Close Up to Fame | Herself (host) | seasons 1 and 2) |
| 2006 | Ang Panday: Book 2 | Eden Roxas / Camia | |
| 2006 | I ♥ Philippine Idol: Exclusive | Herself (host) | |
| 2006 | Your Song | Missy | Episode: "Ngayong Gabi" |
| 2006 | Maalaala Mo Kaya | Maricel | Episode: "Lampara" |
| 2006 | Your Song | Ria | Episode: "Wish" |
| 2007 | Hiram na Mukha | Carissa de Leon / Alicia Roldan | |
| 2007 | Pangarap na Bituin | Cassandra "Cassie" Salcedo | |
| 2007 | Your Song | Melanie | Episode: "Sana Ngayong Pasko" |
| 2007 | Maalaala Mo Kaya | Kaye Chua | Episode: "Singsing" |
| 2007 | Your Song | Aschelle | Episode: "With You" |
| 2008 | Codename: Asero | Emily San Juan | |
| 2008 | Your Song | Arah | Episode: "Muntik Na Kitang Minahal" |
| 2008 | Dear Friend | Anna | Episode: "Chinoy" |
| 2008–2009 | Luna Mystika | Luna Sagrado-Samaniego / Celestina Sagrado | |
| 2008–2010 | SOP | Herself (co-host, performer) | |
| 2009 | Fashionistas by Heart | Herself (host) | |
| 2009 | Sine Novela: Ngayon at Kailanman | Ayra Noche-Torres / Ayra Noche-Villaflor | |
| 2009–2010 | Full House | Maria Jesusa "Jessie" Asuncion-Lazatin | |
| 2010 | Langit sa Piling Mo | Margarita "Marj" Rosales / Marietta Flores | |
| 2010–2013 | Party Pilipinas | Herself (co-host, performer) | |
| 2011 | Dwarfina | Dwarfina / Yna / Fina | |
| 2012 | Legacy | Diana Calcetas | |
| 2012 | Luna Blanca | Adult Blanca | |
| 2012–2013 | Watta Job | Herself (host) | |
| 2012–2015 | iBilib | Herself (guest host) | |
| 2013 | Forever | Young Adora del Prado / Isadora | |
| 2013 | Wagas | Miriam Defensor-Santiago | |
| 2013–2014 | Magkano Ba ang Pag-ibig? | Eloisa Aguirre | |
| 2013–2015 | Sunday All Stars | Herself (co-host, performer) | |
| 2013–2015 | Startalk | Herself (co-host) | |
| 2014 | Weddings TV | Herself (host) | |
| 2015 | Beautiful Strangers | Kristine de Jesus | |
| 2016 | FoodTrip | Herself (host) | |
| 2016 | Juan Happy Love Story | Happy Villanueva-dela Costa | |
| 2017 | Follow Your Heart | Herself (host) | |
| 2017 | Mulawin vs. Ravena | Alwina | |
| 2017–2018 | My Korean Jagiya | Guadalupe Immaculada "Gia" Asuncion-Kim | |
| 2019 | StarStruck | Herself (judge) | |
| 2021–2022 | I Left My Heart in Sorsogon | Celeste Diesta Estrellado | |
| 2022 | Bling Empire | Herself | |
| 2024–2026 | Heart World | Herself | |
| 2025 | Pinoy Big Brother: Celebrity Collab Edition | Herself (houseguest) | Day 92 |
| 2026 | The People Have Spoken | Herself (host) | |

=== Theater ===
| Year | Title | Role |
|---|---|---|
| 2003 | Beauty and the Beast (Leprince de Beaumont) | Belle |

== Discography ==
=== Studio albums ===
| Year | Album | Record label |
|---|---|---|
| 2003 | Heart | Star Music |

=== Compilation albums ===
| Year | Album |
|---|---|
| 2002 | Himig Handog Love Songs |
| 2003 | My First Romance (OST) |
| 2004 | OPM Acoustic Hits |
| 2005 | OPM Acoustic Hits 2 |

=== Music videos ===
| Year | Title | Artist |
|---|---|---|
| 2002 | "Love Has Come My Way" | Heart Evangelista |
| 2003 | "One" | Heart Evangelista |
| 2003 | "Please Be Careful with My Heart" | Heart Evangelista |
| 2007 | "Tuwing Nakikita Ka" | Jericho Rosales |
| 2009 | "Bahay Kubo" | Hale |

== Awards and nominations ==
| Year | Award | Category | Nominated work | Result |
|---|---|---|---|---|
| 2001 | PMPC Star Awards for Television | Best New TV Personality | G-mik | Won |
| 2002 | Himig Handog Awards | Listener's Choice Award | Love Has Come My Way | Won |
| 2002 | Himig Handog Awards | Texter's Choice Award | Love Has Come My Way | Won |
| 2002 | Himig Handog Awards | Album Platinum Award | | Won |
| 2002 | PMPC Star Awards for Movies | Best New Movie Actress | Trip | Won |
| 2003 | Awit Awards | Best Performance by a New Female Artist | Love Has Come My Way | Won |
| 2003 | Asia Pacific Excellence & Handog Kay Ina Awards | Youth Achiever for Arts & Entertainment | | Won |
| 2003 | Ivan Entertainment Productions: Circle of 10 Modeling Agency | Celebrity Endorser of the Year | | Won |
| 2003 | 33rd GMMSF Box-Office Awards | Most Popular Love Team of RP Movies (with John Prats) | | Won |
| 2003 | Himig Handog Awards | Album Platinum Award | | Won |
| 2004 | FAMAS Awards | German Moreno Youth Achievement Award | | Won |
| 2004 | 34th GMMSF Box-Office Awards | Princess of RP Movies | | Won |
| 2005 | 19th PMPC Star Awards for TV | Best Drama Actress | Hiram | Nominated |
| 2007 | PMPC Star Awards for Movies | Female Face of the Night | | Won |
| 2009 | 2009 Metro Manila Film Festival | Best Supporting Actress | Nobody, Nobody But... Juan | Nominated |
| 2009 | 2009 Metro Manila Film Festival | Best Supporting Actress | Mano Po 6: A Mother's Love | Won |
| 2009 | 23rd PMPC Star Awards for Television | Best Lifestyle Show Host | Fashionistas by Heart | Nominated |
| 2009 | 57th FAMAS Awards | Best Actress | Ay, Ayeng | Won |
| 2010 | 58th FAMAS Awards | Best Supporting Actress | Mano Po 6: A Mother's Love | Nominated |
| 2010 | 7th Golden Screen Awards | Best Supporting Actress | Mano Po 6: A Mother's Love | Nominated |
| 2010 | 26th PMPC Star Awards for Movies | Best Supporting Actress | Mano Po 6: A Mother's Love | Nominated |
| 2010 | 12th Gawad PASADO | Best Supporting Actress | Mano Po 6: A Mother's Love | Nominated |
| 2010 | Myx Music Awards 2010 | Favorite Guest Appearance in a Music Video | Bahay Kubo | Won |
| 2014 | 28th PMPC Star Awards for TV | Best Female Showbiz Oriented Talk Show Host | Startalk | Nominated |
| 2014 | Yahoo! Celebrity Awards 2014 | Female TV Host of the Year | Startalk | Nominated |
| 2016 | 30th PMPC Star Awards for Television | Best Drama Actress | Beautiful Strangers | Nominated |
| 2017 | 7th EdukCircleAwards | Best Actress | Mulawin vs. Ravena | Nominated |
| 2019 | 33rd PMPC Star Awards for Television | TV Queens at the Turn of Millennium | | Won |
| 2019 | People Asia | People of the Year 2018–2019 | | Won |
| 2019 | COMGUILD Academe's Awards | Most Admired Social Media Influencer | | Won |
| 2020 | Face of The Year Awards of TodayTV Vietnam | Favorite Foreign Actress | Juan Happy Love Story | Nominated |
| 2020 | FEU Marketistas Choice Awards 2020 | Content Creator of the Year for Fashion Category | | Won |
| 2020 | FEU Marketistas Choice Awards 2020 | Social Media Impact Awardee for Fashion Category | | Won |
| 2020 | FEU Marketistas Choice Awards 2020 | Content Creator of the Year | | Won |
| 2021 | MEGA Fashion Awards 2021 | Most Influential Social Media Personality for Fashion | | Won |
| 2022 | GMA Thanksgiving Gala | Glamorous Star of the Night | | Won |
| 2023 | GMA Gala | Sparkle Star of the Night | | Won |
| 2024 | 5th VP Choice Award | Headliner of the Year | | Won |
| 2024 | GMA GALA | HALL OF FAME | | Won |
| 2024 | GMA GALA (McDonald's Philippines) | The Perpect McCafe Blend of the Night | Heart and Chiz | Won |
| 2024 | MEGA FASHION AWARDS 2024 | Mega Icon | | Won |
| 2024 | THE FASHION FACTOR | Fashion Icon Award | | Won |
| 2025 | The 7th Gawad Lasallianeta | Most Outstanding Brand Endorser | | Won |
| 2025 | The EMIGALA Fashion and Beauty Awards | Global Fashion Influencer of the Year | | Won |
