= Grandpa Is Dead =

- Philippine theatrical release poster
- Original title: Ded na si Lolo
- Directed by: Soxy Topacio
- Written by: Soxy Topacio
- Produced by: Tony Y. Reyes; Antonio P. Tuviera
- Starring: BJ Forbes
- Edited by: Danny Anonuevo
- Music by: Noel Cabangon
- Production company: APT Entertainment
- Distributed by: APT Entertainment
- Release date: May 6, 2009
- Running time: 90 minutes
- Country: Philippines
- Language: Filipino

Grandpa Is Dead (Filipino: Ded na si Lolo) is a 2009 Filipino satirical comedy-drama film directed and written by Soxy Topacio.

It was selected as the Philippine submission for the Best Foreign Language Film at the 82nd Academy Awards over Lola by Brilliante Mendoza. It was not accepted as a nominee.

== Synopsis ==
Bobet (BJ Forbes) and his family are mourning the death of their grandfather. Throughout the six-day wake, unresolved issues and family secrets resurface, challenging the family's resolve.

== Cast ==
- BJ Forbes as Bobet
- Manilyn Reynes as Charito "Charing" Hernandez
- Gina Alajar as Marieta "Mameng" Hernandez
- Elizabeth Oropesa as Dolores "Dolly" Hernandez
- Dick Israel as Isidro "Sidro" Hernandez
- Roderick Paulate as Joonee "Junjun" Hernandez
- Perla Bautista as Pilar Hernandez
- Rainier Castillo as Jimmy
- Richard Quan as Kiko
- Mosang as Kapitana
- Froilan Sales as Dominador "Domeng"
- Phil Noble
- Diego Llorico
- Rhen Escaño as Lucring "Lucy"
- Karylle Quijano as Eves
- Dave Cervantes
- Arpee Bautista
- Perry Escaño
- Richard Jason Paje as RJ
- Tony Cruz as Juanito "Juan" Hernandez
- Rudy Meyer as Mr. Cruz
- Manny Castañeda
- Caesar Cosme
- Pekto
- John Feir
- Gene Padilla
- Deborah Sun as Socorro "Cora" Hernandez
- Gigette Reyes
- Noel Cabangon
- Jess Evardone as Gustin
- Nor Domingo
- Edel Templonuevo

Sources: New York Times

== Production ==
The plot of the film was added with humor by director Soxie Topacio by exploring on numerous Filipino superstitious beliefs regarding the dead which involves several prohibitions such as against wearing red, sweeping the floor, taking a bath, and allowing your tears to fall on the coffin.
