= List of awards and nominations received by Lorna Tolentino =

Lorna Tolentino awards and nominations
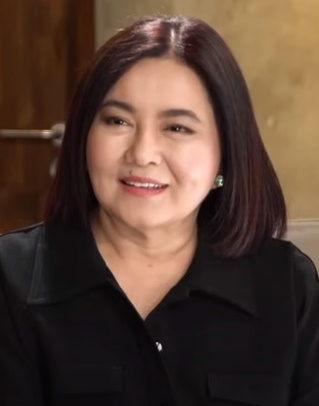
- Tolentino in 2023
Awards and nominations
Award	Wins	Nominations
Asian Television Awards	2	2
Box Office Entertainment Awards	4	4
Catholic Mass Media Awards	0	1
Eastwood City Walk of Fame	1	1
FAMAS Awards	7	22
Gawad Pasado Awards	1	1
Gawad Urian Awards	1	11
Golden Dove Awards	1	1
Golden Screen Awards	1	3
Golden Screen TV Awards	2	4
Jeepney TV Fan Favorite Awards	0	1
Luna Awards	4	9
Metro Manila Film Festival	2	3
Philippine Association of the Record Industry	1	1
PMPC Star Awards for Movies	5	11
PMPC Star Awards for Television	5	14
Film Development Council of the Philippines	1	1
The EDDYS	2	2
Young Critics Circle	1	3

Totals (Note: Certain award groups do not simply award one winner. They acknowledge several different recipients, have runners-up, and have third place. Since this is a specific recognition and is different from losing an award, runner-up mentions are considered wins in this award tally. For simplification and to avoid errors, each award in this list has been presumed to have had a prior nomination.)
- Wins: 41
- Nominations: 94

Lorna Tolentino is a Filipino actress who has received a great number of awards and nominations for her work in film and television. She was the fourth leading actress to achieve Grand Slam, winning Best Actress in all major award-giving bodies in the Philippines for her role in the romantic drama Narito ang Puso Ko (1992).

Tolentino has been described as one of the best Filipino actresses of all time. She has received sixteen FAMAS Award for Best Actress nominations, winning three for Narito ang Puso Ko (1992), Abakada... Ina (2001), and Katas ng Saudi (2007). She is also the third most nominated actress for the leading role in Gawad Urian Awards history (behind Nora Aunor and Vilma Santos), garnering 10 nominations since 1983. As of 2020, Tolentino ranked fifth among women with the most Best Actress wins this century.

With a career spanning 50 years, she has received seven FAMAS Awards, four PMPC Star Awards for Movies, four Luna Awards, five PMPC Star Awards for Television, a Gawad Urian Award and commendations from Asian Television Awards, Film Development Council of the Philippines and Young Critics Circle.

== Awards and nominations ==
Awards and nominations received by Lorna Tolentino
Award (Note: Awards, festivals, honors and other miscellaneous organizations are listed in alphabetical order.)	Year (Note: Indicates the year of ceremony. Each year is linked to the article about the awards held that year, wherever possible.)	Category	Nominated work	Result	Ref.
Asian Television Awards	2005	Best Drama Performance by an Actress	Despite the Hurts, an Aids Victim Story	Highly commended	
Asian Television Awards	2013	Best Drama Performance by an Actress	Pahiram ng Sandali	Highly commended	
Box Office Entertainment Awards	1982	Ms. RP Movies	Herself	Won	(Note: 12th GMMSF Box Office Entertainment Awards)
Box Office Entertainment Awards	1992	Ms. RP Movies	Herself	Won	(Note: 22nd GMMSF Box Office Entertainment Awards)
Box Office Entertainment Awards	1995	Ms. RP Movies	Herself	Won	(Note: 25th GMMSF Box Office Entertainment Awards)
Box Office Entertainment Awards	2020	All-Time Favorite Actress	FPJ's Ang Probinsyano	Won	
Catholic Mass Media Awards	1988	Best Actress	Maging Akin Ka Lamang	Nominated	
Eastwood City Walk of Fame	2006	Inductee	Herself	Won	
FAMAS Awards	1972	Best Child Actress	Lumuha Pati Anghel	Won	
FAMAS Awards	1974	Best Child Actress	Pag-ibig Mo, Buhay Ko	Nominated	
FAMAS Awards	1987	Best Supporting Actress	Nakagapos na Puso	Nominated	
FAMAS Awards	1988	Best Actress	Maging Akin Ka Lamang	Nominated	
FAMAS Awards	1989	Best Actress	Nagbabagang Luha	Nominated	
FAMAS Awards	1990	Best Actress	Kailan Mahuhugasan ang Kasalanan?	Nominated	
FAMAS Awards	1992	Best Actress	Kislap sa Dilim	Nominated	
FAMAS Awards	1993	Best Actress	Narito ang Puso Ko	Won	
FAMAS Awards	1994	Best Actress	Gaano Kita Kamahal	Nominated	
FAMAS Awards	1996	Best Actress	Sa Ngalan ng Pag-ibig	Nominated	
FAMAS Awards	1997	Best Actress	Bayarang Puso	Nominated	
FAMAS Awards	1998	Best Actress	Hanggang Kailan Kita Mamahalin?	Nominated	
FAMAS Awards	2000	Best Actress	Luksong Tinik	Nominated	
FAMAS Awards	2001	Best Actress	Yakapin Mo Ang Umaga	Nominated	
FAMAS Awards	2002	Best Actress	Abakada... Ina	Won	
FAMAS Awards	2004	Best Actress	Magnifico	Nominated	
FAMAS Awards	2008	Best Actress	Katas ng Saudi	Won	
FAMAS Awards	2011	Best Actress	Sa 'yo Lamang	Nominated	
FAMAS Awards	2014	Best Actress	Burgos	Nominated	
FAMAS Awards	2003	Myra 300-E Star of the Night	Herself	Won	
FAMAS Awards	2016	Best Supporting Actress	Crazy Beautiful You	Won	
FAMAS Awards	2016	Front Row Female Celebrity of the Night	Herself	Won	
Gawad PASADO Awards	2011	Best Actress	Sa 'yo Lamang	Won	
Gawad Urian Awards	1983	Best Actress	Moral	Nominated	
Gawad Urian Awards	1989	Best Actress	Natutulog Pa ang Diyos	Nominated	
Gawad Urian Awards	1992	Best Actress	Kislap sa Dilim	Nominated	
Gawad Urian Awards	1993	Best Actress	Narito ang Puso Ko	Won	
Gawad Urian Awards	1994	Best Actress	Gaano Kita Kamahal	Nominated	
Gawad Urian Awards	1996	Best Actress	Sa Ngalan ng Pag-ibig	Nominated	
Gawad Urian Awards	1997	Best Actress	May Nagmahal Sa Iyo	Nominated	
Gawad Urian Awards	2000	Best Actress	Luksong Tinik	Nominated	
Gawad Urian Awards	2004	Best Supporting Actress	Magnifico	Nominated	
Gawad Urian Awards	2008	Best Actress	Katas ng Saudi	Nominated	
Gawad Urian Awards	2014	Best Actress	Burgos	Nominated	
Golden Dove Awards	2011	Best Actress for Drama Program	Minsan Lang Kita Iibigin	Won	
Golden Screen Awards	2004	Best Performance by an Actress in a Lead Role – Drama	Magnifico	Nominated	
Golden Screen Awards	2008	Best Performance by an Actress in a Lead Role – Musical or Comedy	Katas ng Saudi	Won	
Golden Screen Awards	2014	Best Performance by an Actress in a Lead Role – Drama	Burgos	Nominated	
Golden Screen TV Awards	2004	Outstanding Lead Actress	Hanggang Kailan	Won	
Golden Screen TV Awards	2011	Outstanding Performance by an Actress in a Drama Series	Minsan Lang Kita Iibigin	Won	
Golden Screen TV Awards	2014	Outstanding Performance by an Actress in a Single Drama/Telemovie Program	Magpakailanman: Susan Maniego	Nominated	
Golden Screen TV Awards	2014	Outstanding Performance by an Actress in a Drama Series	Pahiram ng Sandali	Nominated	
Jeepney TV Fan Favorite Awards	2022	Fave Kontrabida	FPJ's Ang Probinsyano	Nominated	
Luna Awards	1988	Best Actress	Maging Akin Ka Lamang	Won	
Luna Awards	1993	Best Actress	Narito ang Puso Ko	Won	
Luna Awards	1994	Best Actress	Gaano Kita Kamahal	Nominated	
Luna Awards	1996	Best Actress	Sa Ngalan ng Pag-ibig	Nominated	
Luna Awards	2000	Best Actress	Luksong Tinik	Nominated	
Luna Awards	2001	Best Actress	Sugatang Puso	Nominated	
Luna Awards	2002	Best Actress	Abakada... Ina	Won	
Luna Awards	2011	Best Actress	Sa 'yo Lamang	Won	
Luna Awards	2016	Best Supporting Actress	Crazy Beautiful You	Nominated	
Metro Manila Film Festival	1999	Best Actress	Luksong Tinik	Won	
Metro Manila Film Festival	2004	Female Star of the Night	Herself	Won	
Metro Manila Film Festival	2024	Best Supporting Actress	Espantaho	Nominated	
Philippine Association of the Record Industry	2009	Gold Record Award	Wings of the Soul	Won	
Philippine Paradise of Stars	2007	Inductee	Herself	Won	
PMPC Star Awards for Movies	1988	Movie Actress of the Year	Maging Akin Ka Lamang	Won	
PMPC Star Awards for Movies	1989	Movie Actress of the Year	Nagbabagang Luha	Nominated	
PMPC Star Awards for Movies	1993	Movie Actress of the Year	Narito ang Puso Ko	Won	
PMPC Star Awards for Movies	1996	Female Star of the Night	Herself	Won	
PMPC Star Awards for Movies	2000	Female Star of the Night	Herself	Won	
PMPC Star Awards for Movies	2001	Female Star of the Night	Herself	Won	
PMPC Star Awards for Movies	2008	Movie Actress of the Year	Katas ng Saudi	Nominated	
PMPC Star Awards for Movies	2010	Female Face of the Night	Herself	Nominated	
PMPC Star Awards for Movies	2011	Movie Actress of the Year	Sa 'yo Lamang	Nominated	
PMPC Star Awards for Movies	2014	Movie Actress of the Year	Burgos	Nominated	
PMPC Star Awards for Movies	2016	Movie Supporting Actress of the Year	Crazy Beautiful You	Nominated	
PMPC Star Awards for Television	2000	Best Single Performance by an Actress	Pira-Pirasong Pangarap: Tinig ng Kawalan	Won	
PMPC Star Awards for Television	2003	Best Drama Actress	Kay Tagal Kang Hinintay	Nominated	
PMPC Star Awards for Television	2004	Best Drama Actress	Kay Tagal Kang Hinintay	Won	
PMPC Star Awards for Television	2004	Best Lifestyle Show Host	All About You	Nominated	
PMPC Star Awards for Television	2005	Best Single Performance by an Actress	Magpakailanman: Sa Kabila ng AIDS	Won	
PMPC Star Awards for Television	2007	Female Star of the Night	Herself	Won	
PMPC Star Awards for Television	2007	Best Female Showbiz Oriented Talk Show Host	Startalk	Nominated	
PMPC Star Awards for Television	2007	Best Single Performance by an Actress	Magpakailanman: Hiram Na Haplos	Nominated	
PMPC Star Awards for Television	2009	Best Single Performance by an Actress	Maalaala Mo Kaya: Chess	Nominated	
PMPC Star Awards for Television	2010	Best Drama Actress	Dahil May Isang Ikaw	Nominated	
PMPC Star Awards for Television	2011	Best Drama Actress	Minsan Lang Kita Iibigin	Nominated	
PMPC Star Awards for Television	2018	Best Drama Supporting Actress of the Year	Asintado	Won	
PMPC Star Awards for Television	2021	Best Drama Supporting Actress of the Year	FPJ's Ang Probinsyano	Nominated	
PMPC Star Awards for Television	2023	Best Drama Supporting Actress of the Year	FPJ's Ang Probinsyano	Nominated	
Sine Sandaan by FDCP	2019	Luminaries of Philippine Cinema (Best Actress)	Herself	Won	
The EDDYS	2019	BeauteDerm Star of the Night	Herself	Won	
The EDDYS	2025	Best Supporting Actress	Espantaho	Won	
Young Critics Circle	1993	Best Performance	Narito	Nominated	
Young Critics Circle	1998	Best Performance	Hanggang Kailan Kita Mamahalin?	Nominated	
Young Critics Circle	1999	Best Performance	Luksong Tinik	Won	
