= Frame-up (disambiguation) =

A frame-up (frameup) or set-up is the act of falsely implicating (framing) someone in a crime by providing fabricated evidence or testimony.

Frame-up may also refer to:

== Film ==
- The Frame-Up, a 1937 American crime film directed by D. Ross Lederman
- Frame Up, a 1968 Italian noir-crime film directed by Emilio Miraglia
- Frame Up, a 1997 Philippine action film edited and directed by Pepe Marcos.

== Book ==
- Frame-Up for Murder, a 1958 Nero Wolfe mystery novella by Rex Stout
- Frame-Up: The Assassination of Martin Luther King, a 1970 book by Harold Weisberg
