= Ernie Zarate =

Filipino actor (1939–2017)

- Born: Ernesto R. Zárate; 1939
- Died: September 16, 2017 (aged 77–78)
- Occupations: Actor; architect; writer; news anchor

Ernesto R. Zárate (1939 – September 16, 2017), professionally known as Ernie Zarate, was a Filipino actor, writer, architect and news anchor.

== Career ==
Zarate served as a news anchor for The Big News at ABC in the 1960s.

He served as the national director of the Philippine Institute of Architects.

== Death ==
Zarate died from complications of diabetes at the age of 77 on the evening of September 16, 2017.

== Filmography ==
=== Film ===
Year	Title	Role	Note(s)	Ref(s).
1971	Pagdating sa Dulo			
1971	Daluyong!			
1972	Till Death Do Us Part			
1973	Now and Forever			
1973	Tanikalang Dugo			
1974	Tinimbang Ka Ngunit Kulang			
1974	Mga Tigre ng Sierra Cruz			
1975	Ang Manika Ay Takot sa Krus			
1975	Huwag Pamarisan!... Mister Mo... Lover Boy Ko!			
1975	Diligin Mo ng Hamog ang Uhaw Na Lupa			
1977	Bakya Mo, Neneng			
1977	Walang Katapusang Tag-araw			
1978	Disco Fever			
1978	Ikaw Ay Akin			
1979	Okey Lang, Basta't Kapiling Kita			
1979	Warrant of Arrest			
1980	Nakaw Na Pag-ibig			
1980	Girlfriend			
1981	Sierra Madre			
1984	Daang Hari			
1985	Ben Tumbling			
1985	Warbus	Major Kutran		
1986	Mabuhay Ka... sa Baril!	Illegal recruiter		
1986	Cordillera	Ka Dado		
1987	Kapag Lumaban ang Api	Chavez		
1987	Kamagong	Chavez		
1987	Kung Aagawin Mo ang Lahat sa Akin	Dr. Fernando		
1987	Feliciano Luces: Alyas Kumander Toothpick, Mindanao	The mayor		
1987	Target: Sparrow Unit			
1987	Kapag Puno Na ang Salop			
1987	Anak ni Zuma			
1988	Afuang: Bounty Hunter	Mr. Laurete		
1988	Rosa Mistica	The caretaker	"Mga Pulang Rosas ni Rosanna" segment	
1988	Haw Haw de Karabaw			
1988	Lost Command			
1988	Boy Negro	Chief of police		
1988	Kumander Dante			
1988	Sandakot Na Bala	Assemblyman		
1989	3 Mukha ng Pag-ibig	University dean	"I Love You, Moomoo" segment	
1989	Eagle Squad	Gen. Santos		
1989	Driving Force	Accountant		
1989	Fight for Us	Bishop Romero		
1989	Kailan Mahuhugasan ang Kasalanan?	Judge		
1989	Kung Kasalanan Man	Plastic surgeon		
1989	Ako ang Huhusga			
1989	Abot Hanggang Sukdulan	Judge		
1989	Babayaran Mo ng Dugo			
1989	Jones Bridge Massacre (Task Force Clabio)	Alfredo Lim		
1990	Kahit Konting Pagtingin	Atty. Alvarez		
1990	Kahit Singko, Hindi Ko Babayaran ang Buhay Mo			
1990	Gumapang Ka sa Lusak	Rachel's father		
1990	Bakit Ikaw Pa Rin?			
1990	Kristobal			
1990	Samson and Goliath			
1990	Kaaway ng Batas	Doctor		
1990	Andrea, Paano Ba ang Maging Isang Ina?			
1991	Pangako ng Puso			
1991	Bingbong: The Vincent Crisologo Story			
1991	Boyong Mañalac: Hoodlum Terminator			
1991	Ang Katawan ni Sofia			
1991	Makiusap Ka sa Diyos	Fr. Emman		
1991	Pakasalan Mo Ako			
1991	Ang Totoong Buhay ni Pacita M.			
1992	Jesus dela Cruz at ang Mga Batang Riles			
1992	Mukhang Bungo: Da Coconut Nut	Col. Fidel Estrada		
1992	Cordora: Lulutang Ka sa Sarili Mong Dugo	Fr. Emman		
1992	Shotgun Banjo			
1992	Gobernador			
1993	Pugoy – Hostage: Davao			
1993	Capt. Rassul Alih, Hindi Sa'yo ang Mindanao			
1993	Galvez: Hanggang sa Dulo ng Mundo Hahanapin Kita			
1993	Aguinaldo	CPP Chairman		
1993	Doring Dorobo: Hagupit ng Batas	NBI Director Alfredo Lim		
1993	May Minamahal	Tito Felix		
1994	Hindi Pa Tapos ang Laban			
1994	Markadong Hudas	Col. Romero		
1994	Sana Dalawa ang Puso Ko	Judge		
1994	Ging Gang Gooly Giddiyap: I Love You Daddy	Attorney		
1994	Epimaco Velasco, NBI	Jolly Bugarin		
1994	Vampira			
1995	Alfredo Lim, Batas ng Maynila			
1995	Tapang sa Tapang			
1995	Ipaglaban Mo: The Movie		"Rape (Case No. 538842)" segment	
1995	O-Ha! Ako Pa?	Dracula/first victim		
1995	Patayin sa Sindak si Barbara	Priest		
1995	Asero	Narding's foster father		
1995	Minsan Pa: Kahit Konting Pagtingin Part 2	Atty. Alvarez		
1996	Anak, Pagsubok Lamang ng Diyos	Prison director		
1996	Adan Lazaro	Sen. Miranda		
1996	Impakto	Sagrado		
1996	Ganti ng Puso			
1996	Radio Romance	Fernando Balmaceda		
1996	Ama, Ina, Anak	Dado		
1996	Pag-ibig Ko Sayo'y Totoo	Cmdre. Manalo		
1996	Papunta Ka Pa Lang, Pabalik Na Ako	Maira's father		
1996	Reputasyon			
1996	Isla: The Young Version			
1996	Virgin Island			
1996	Bakit May Kahapon Pa?	Colonel		
1996	Ang Probinsyano	Investigation officer		
1996	Onyok Tigasin			
1997	Daniel Eskultor: Hindi Umaatras sa Laban	Colonel		
1997	Mariano Mison... NBI	Jolly Bugarin		
1997	Ambisyosa			
1997	Diliryo	Family lawyer		
1997	Hanggang Ngayon, Ika'y Minamahal	Judge Santos		
1997	Frame Up	Gen. Robles		
1997	Ipaglaban Mo: The Movie II			
1997	Kokey			
1997	Halik	Tito Ben		
1998	Silaw			
1998	Kahit Pader, Gigibain Ko	C/Supt. Moreno		
1998	Ben Delubyo	General		
1998	Pusong Mamon			
1998	Puso ng Pasko	Family doctor		
1999	Type Kita... Walang Kokontra	Judge		
1999	Pintado	Ravena		
1999	Desperado: Bahala Na ang Itaas			
1999	Ako ang Lalagot sa Hininga Mo	Mayor Cervantes		
2000	Nag-aapoy Na Laman	Atty. Tancero		
2000	Tumbador	Mr. De Leon		
2000	Baliktaran	Hepe Monsanto		
2000	The Debut	Tito Lenny		
2000	Ika-13 Kapitulo	Father Francis		
2000	Sugo ng Tondo	Col. Roberto Nebres		
2000	Ping Lacson: Super Cop	Senator Ernesto Maceda		
2001	Hindi Sisiw ang Kalaban Mo	Mr. Joson		
2001	Kaaway Hanggang Hukay	Roland Canlas		
2001	Maderazo: Bayad Na Pati Kaluluwa Mo	Lt. Domingo		
2001	Pilak	Lucio Aragon		
2001	Amasona: Kumakasa...Pumuputok			
2002	Hustler			
2002	Batas ng Lansangan	Convict's father		
2002	Kapag ang Palay Naging Bigas... May Bumayo			
2002	Teteng Baliw			
2003	The Legend: Tomagan			
2003	When Eagles Strike	Ramiro	Original title: Operation Balikatan	
2003	Filipinas	Deceased father	Photograph cameo	
2004	Gagamboy	Boss		
2004	Beautiful Life	Fernando		
2005	Terrorist Hunter		Shot in 2003	
2006	Eternity	Leoncio		
2007	Katas ng Saudi	Father-in-law		
2008	Desperadas	Stephanie's father		
2012	Ang Katiwala			

=== Television ===
Year	Title	Role	Notes	Ref(s).
1962	The Big News	Himself (anchor)		
1988	A Dangerous Life	Andres Narvasa	Television film	
1993–1999	Maalaala Mo Kaya	Various	5 episodes	
1997–1999	Esperanza	Councilor Martin Alberto		
1999–2000	Labs Ko si Babe			
1999–2001	Wansapanataym	Various	3 episodes	
1999–2002	Ang Munting Paraiso	Lolo Ingo		
2000–2002	Pangako sa 'Yo	Mayor Enrique Zalameda		
2002	S.A.T.S.U.			
2003–2004	Narito ang Puso Ko	Enrico	Guest	
2004; 2014	Magpakailanman		Episodes: "Sayaw ng Tagumpay" "Kulam ng Paghihiganti"	
2010	Grazilda	Leon	Guest	
2011	Magic Palayok	Ipe Calevio		
2013	Forever	Older Federico Gallardo		
2013	Home Sweet Home	Duarte Caharian		
2014–2015	More Than Words		Guest	

== Theatre ==
Year	Title	Role	Note(s)	Ref(s).
1974	Alitan sa Venezia			
2006	The Vigil			

== Bibliography ==
- Zárate, Ernie (2000). Oro, Plata, Mata!: Folk Beliefs in Philippine Architecture, National Commission for Culture and the Arts
- Zárate, Ernesto R.; Rico, Joel; Zaragoza, Ramon Ma. (2003). Philippine Institute of Architects: 70 years of History, 1933–2003, Adarna Publishing
- Zárate, Ernesto R. (2004). More Filipino Building Beliefs, Rendor Printing Corp.
- Zárate, Ernie (2004). The Malictionary: Pronouncing Dictionary, National Book Store, Inc.

== Awards ==
Year	Award	Category	Work	Result
1979	Gawad Urian Awards	Best Supporting Actor	Ikaw Ay Akin	Nominated
2001	Palanca Awards	Essay	"Lengua Estopado Does Not Mean Stupid Language"	2nd place
