= Zoom, Zoom, Superman! =

- Directed by: Ishmael Bernal; Joey Gosiengfiao; Elwood Perez
- Written by: Joey Gosienfiao; Douglas Quijano
- Screenplay by: Douglas Quijano; Elwood Perez; Joey Gosienfiao
- Produced by: Victor Gosiengfiao; Douglas Quijano
- Starring: Ariel Ureta; Rita Gomez; Boots Anson-Roa; Rosanna Ortiz; Liza Lorena; Celia Rodriguez; Edgar Mortiz; Gina Alajar; Max Alvarado; Gina Pareño; Cloyd Robinson; Orestes Ojeda
- Cinematography: Rodolfo Dinio
- Music by: Demetrio Velasquez
- Production company: Sine Pilipino
- Release date: August 24, 1973
- Country: Philippines
- Language: Filipino

Zoom, Zoom, Superman! is a 1973 Filipino parody film of the DC Comics superhero Superman. The film stars Ariel Ureta as the titular superhero, which is also his debut film. Filipino director Joey Gosiengfiao, who is known for his campy films, directed this film as one of his firsts. Elwood Perez and Ishmael Bernal served as co-directors. The film has three directors, because it is a trilogy-in-one film, where a director directed an episode each.

The film had copyright infringement issues even though it is a parody, a work that is protected from copyright violation because of the fair use principle. From 1973 to 1981, it was the highest grossing film in Philippine cinema, defeating other known box-office breaking actors during those times including Dolphy and Fernando Poe Jr. This record was surpassed by the 1981 film, Dear Heart that top-billed Sharon Cuneta and Gabby Concepcion.

== Cast ==
- Ariel Ureta as Superman
- Rita Gomez as The Mad Scientist
- Boots Anson-Roa as Superman's Creator
- Rosanna Ortiz as The Witch
- Liza Lorena as The Millionairess
- Celia Rodriguez as The Spiderwoman
- Edgar Mortiz as The Jewel Thief
- Gina Alajar as The Possessed
- Max Alvarado as Tarzan
- Gina Pareño as The Ape Monster
- Cloyd Robinson as The Leprechaun
- Orestes Ojeda as The Man in the Mirror
- Angie Ferro
