= Orestes Ojeda =

Filipino actor (1956–2021)

- Born: Luis C. Pagalilauan; 3 January 1956; Tuguegarao, Cagayan, Philippines
- Died: 27 July 2021 (aged 65); Taguig, Philippines
- Resting place: The Heritage Park, Taguig, Philippines
- Occupation: Actor
- Years active: 1973–2004; 2015–2016

Orestes Ojeda (January 3, 1956 − July 27, 2021) was a Filipino actor in movies and television.

== Career ==
Born Luis C. Pagalilauan at Cagayan Valley, he was 17 years old when he was persuaded by director Joey Gosiengfiao to join show business. He was formally introduced as a supporting actor in Zoom, Zoom, Superman!, starring Ariel Ureta in 1973. He also appeared in Sunugin Ang Samar (1974), Isang Gabi, Tatlong Babae! (1974), May Isang Tsuper Ng Taksi (1975) Ang Boyfriend Kong Baduy (1976) and Divino (1976). He played the lead role as a priest in Pagsambang Bayan (1977).

He was also in the cast of National Artist Ishmael Bernal's 1980 classic Manila By Night, the 1983 heavy drama Broken Marriage and the 1986 melodrama The Graduates. He worked with Lino Brocka in the 1977 Metro Manila Film Festival entry Inay playing one of Alicia Vergel's children. In 1985, he did the Peque Gallaga opus Scorpio Nights, which tells the story of a college student (played by Daniel Fernando) who had an affair with an unfaithful wife (Anna Marie Gutierrez). This wife is married to a night-shift security guard (played by Ojeda). He starred in Dingding Lang Ang Pagitan (1986) with Maria Isabel Lopez.

He appeared in the Aubrey Miles horror-flick Sanib in 2003, and starred with Vilma Santos in Dekada '70 (2002) and Susan Roces in Mano Po 2: My Home (2003).

He also appeared in more than 115 movies and television shows.

== Personal life ==
He was a Philippine School of Business Administration alumnus. He was a varsity basketball player in college and was bound to become a professional basketball player before he decided to become an actor.

In between acting assignments, he painted and managed an art gallery.

== Death ==
Ojeda died on July 27, 2021, at the age of 65, due to pancreatic cancer.

== Filmography ==
=== Film ===
Year	Title	Role
1973	Zoom, Zoom, Superman!	The Man in the Mirror
1976	Magsikap: Kayod sa Araw, Kayod sa Gabi	
1980	Aguila	Victor "Vic" L. Aguila
1980	Manila by Night	Pebrero
1981	Blue Jeans	
1981	Macho Gigolo	Mike Garrido
1981	Kasalanan Ba?	
1982	No Other Love	
1982	Diary of Cristina Gaston	Cesar Santos
1983	Piknik	
1983	Broken Marriage	Wowee
1984	Working Girls	Jun
1984	Tender Age	
1985	Bulaklak ng Magdamag	Atty. Valdez
1985	Mga Paru-parong Buking	Senen's Brother
1985	Gamitin Mo Ako	Efren
1985	Scorpio Nights	Security Guard
1985	And the World Became Flesh	
1986	The Graduates	
1986	Unang Gabi	
1986	Dingding ang Pagitan	
1987	Ibigay Mo sa Akin ang Bukas	
1987	Bakit Iisa ang Pag-ibig	
1988	Rosa Mistica	Lawyer
1990	"Ako ang Batas" -Gen. Tomas Karingal	
1990	Love at First Sight	Ruel
1990	Mana sa ina	Rufino Sevilla
1990	Titser's Enemi No. 1	Mr. Pamutsa
1990	Beautiful Girl	
1990	Kasalanan Bang Sambahin Ka?	Steven
1990	Inosente	Pasyong
1990	Si Prinsipe Abante at ang Lihim ng Ibong Adarna	Duke de Bigote
1991	Maging Sino Ka Man	Ben
1991	Emma Salazar Case	Darwin
1992	Padre Amante Guerrero	Man in Jacuzzi
1992	Nympa sa Putikan	
1992	First Time... Like a Virgin!	
1992	Magdaleno Orbos: Sa Kuko ng Mga Lawin	
1992	Shotgun Banjo	Gonzalo
1992	Kapag Nabigo Ang Batas	Efren
1993	Kahit Ako'y Busabos	
1993	Inay	TeddysCousin
1994	Nag-Iisang Bituin	
1994	Col. Billy Bibit, RAM	Bobby Tañada
1995	Batang-X	Kiko & Angel's Father
1996	Seth Corteza	
1996	Huling Sagupaan	Coronel Licardo
1996	Bangis	Col. Hernandes
1996	Super Ranger Kids	Roy
1998	Kahit Mabuhay Kang Muli	Mr. Ramirez
1998	Sige, Subukan Mo	Santiago
1999	Tatapatan Ko ang Lakas Mo	Hepe
2002	Dekada '70	Dr. Rodrigo
2003	Mano Po 2: My Home	Pio Andres
2004	Kuya	Chloe and Grace's father

=== Television ===
Year	Title	Role
1988	Regal Shocker: Nang Gumanti ang Mga Bangkay	
1988	Regal Shocker: Impiyerno sa Lupa	
1996–1999	Tierra Sangre	Miguel Sangre
1997	Maalaala Mo Kaya: Gitara	
2004	Te Amo, Maging Sino Ka Man	Crispin
2015	Once Upon a Kiss	Adolfo Pelaez

== Selected filmography ==
- Kuya (2004)
- Sanib (2003)
- Pistolero (2002)
- Hesus Rebolusyunaryo (2002)
- Masikip Na Ang Mundo Mo, Labrador (2001)
- Oras Na Para Lumaban (2001)
- Katayan (2000)
- Most Wanted (2000)
- Eksperto: Ako Ang Sasagupa! (2000)
- Markado (1999)
- Sige, Subukan Mo (1998)
- Babae Sa Dalampasigan (1997)
- Haragan (1997)
- Bocaue Pagoda Tragedy (1995)
- Binibini Ng Aking Panaginip (1994)
- Aguinaldo (1993)
- Sinungaling Mong Puso (1992)
- Shotgun Banjo: Mahal na Mahal Kita (1992)
- Big Boy Bato: Kilabot ng Kankaloo (1992)
- Maging Sino Ka Man (1991)
- Hindi Kita Iiwanang Buhay: Kapitan Paile (1990)
- Walang Piring Ang Katarungan (1990)
- SGT. Patalinhug C.I.S. (1990)
- Beautiful Girl (1990)
- Moises Platon (1989)
- Walang Panginoon (1989)
- Diligin Ng Suka Ang Uhaw Na Lumpia (1987)
- Dingding Lang Ang Pagitan (1986)
- Tender Age (1984)
- Broken Marriage (1983)
- Sisang Tabak (1981)
- Kambal Sa Uma (1979)
- Mga Paru-parong Ligaw (1978)
- Huwag Hamakin Hostess (1978)
- Pang Umaga, Pang Tanghali, Pang Gabi (1977)
- Ang Boyfriend Kong Baduy (1976)
- Lulubog Lilitaw Sa Ilalim Ng Tulay (1975)
- Sunugin ang Samar (1974)
