= Gosiengfiao =

Gosiengfiao is a Filipino surname. Notable people with the surname include:

- Alodia Gosiengfiao (born 1988), Filipina cosplayer, model, TV presenter, singer, pianist, vlogger, and actress
- Joey Gosiengfiao (1941–2007), Filipino movie director
