= Kambal sa Uma =

Kambal sa Uma may refer to:

- Kambal sa Uma, a 1979 film directed by Joey Gosiengfiao
- Kambal sa Uma (TV series), a 2009 Philippine television drama fantasy series
