= Liz Alindogan =

Filipino actress

- Born: Elizabeth Alindogan; Sorsogon, Philippines
- Occupation: Actress
- Years active: 1980–present
- Children: 6

Elizabeth Alindogan Kho (born 1959/1960), professionally known as Liz Alindogan, is a Filipino actress.

== Career ==
Alindogan was a model when discovered by comedian Dolphy in a fashion show in Manila Hotel. Her first film was Dolphy's Angels in 1980 with Carmi Martin, Anna Marie Gutierrez, Yehlen Catral and Dolphy.

She also did risqué film roles in mid-1980s such as for Heartache City with Maria Isabel Lopez, Escort Girls with Jaclyn Jose, Unang Karanasan with George Estregan, Company of Women with Mark Gil, and Mga Nakaw Na Sandali with Ronaldo Valdez.

She became the leading lady of action stars like Fernando Poe Jr. in Ang Panday, Ang Aguila at Falcon, and Sierra Madre, Rudy Fernandez in Wanted: Sabas, ang Kilabot, Dante Varona in Nagbabagang Lupa... Nagbabagang Araw, Ace Vergel in Kapwa Simaron, and Jess Lapid Jr. in Cuadro de Alas.

In 1986, Alindogan attempted to produce a film called The Diary of Vietnam Rose, starring herself in the title role and directed by Celso Ad. Castillo, but it ultimately went unfinished when the largely self-financed production had depleted its budget; by September 1986, the film was no longer being produced. The surviving reels from the production were reused three decades later for the 2016 documentary People Power Bombshell: The Diary of Vietnam Rose.

Alindogan was a cast member of the ABS-CBN television series 100 Days to Heaven (2011), starring Coney Reyes, Jodi Sta. Maria and Xyriel Manabat, among others.

== Personal life ==
Alindogan studied commerce at the Philippine Christian University in the 1970s.

Her first husband was former action star Jess Lapid Jr. (separated). They had two children. According to Alindogan, actor Fernando Poe Jr. also attempted to court her early in her film career, and that she rebuffed his advances.

Alindogan is now married to businessman Benny Kho with whom she has four children.

== Filmography ==
=== Film ===
Year	Title	Role	Note(s)	Ref(s).
1980	Dolphy's Angels			
1980	John & Marsha '80			
1980	Ang Agila at ang Falcon			
1980	Ang Panday	Monica		
1981	Sierra Madre			
1981	Ex-Wife			
1981	Wanted: Sabas, ang Kilabot			
1981	Diego Bandido			
1981	Bulldog			
1981	Nagbabagang Lupa... Nagbabagang Araw			
1981	Kapwa Simaron			
1981	Cuadro de Alas			
1981	Mr. One-Two-Three Part 2			
1982	Mga Hayop sa Paraiso			
1982	Juan Balutan			
1982	Sugo			
1982	Johnny Tanggo			
1982	Estranghero			
1982	Sa Harap ng Bibitayan			
1982	Rocco, ang Batang Bato			
1982	Lalaki Ako			
1982	Mission: Dakpin si... Bogart			
1982	Kumander Melody			
1982	Bad Boy from Dadiangas			
1983	Pugante			
1984	Hulihin si... Boy Sputnik			
1984	Bitag			
1984	Sendong Sungkit			
1984	Kumander Cobra			
1985	Sa Dibdib ng Sierra Madre			
1985	Escort Girls			
1985	Heartache City			
1985	Unang Karanasan			
1985	Company of Women			
1985	Ulo ng Gang-Ho: Viong ng Sampaloc			
1985	Johnny Rambo Tanggo: Part III			
1985	Eden			
1985	Carding Estrabel: Tirador ng Malabon			
1986	Alexandra		guest star	
1986	Anak ng Supremo			
1986	Rocky Tan-go IV			
1986	Laban Kung Laban			
1986	Mga Nakaw Na Sandali			
1986	The Diary of Vietnam Rose		Unreleased film Reused in 2016 documentary People Power Bombshell	
1990	Espadang Patpat			
1998	Alipin ng Aliw			
2006	Batas Militar	Aling Ofelia		
2013	Ang Misis ni Meyor			
2017	Bhoy Intsik			
2021	House Tour			
2023	Mahjong Nights			
2023	Breathe Again			
2023	Hilom			

=== Television ===
- Tunay Na Buhay (2011)
- 100 Days to Heaven (2011) Carmen Mosqueda
- Recuerdo de Amor (2002)
- Maalaala Mo Kaya - "Suman at Ketchup" (2002)
- Maalaala Mo Kaya - "Tindahan" (2011)
- Maalaala Mo Kaya - "Manika II" (2012)
- Maalaala Mo Kaya - "Kandila" (2012)
