= Rio Locsin =

Filipino actress (born 1961)

- Born: Maria Theresa Rosario Garcia; October 3, 1961 (age 65); Candelaria, Quezon, Philippines
- Occupation: Actress
- Years active: 1978–present
- Spouse(s): Padim Israel; Al Tantay (separated)
- Children: 3

Rio Locsin (born Maria Theresa Rosario Garcia Nayve-Israel; October 3, 1961) is a Filipino actress. Known primarily for her roles in films with underlying social themes, she began her career playing daring characters and eventually ventured dramatic roles in the succeeding years, noted for her portrayals in Lino Brocka's Ina, Kapatid, Anak (1979) and Init (1979), Elwood Perez's Disgrasyada (1979), Ishmael Bernal's Manila By Night (1980) & Working Girls (1984) and Laurice Guillen's Kapag Puso’y Sinugatan (1985). In 2009, she was named Best Supporting Actress at the Cinema One Originals Digital Film Festival and was inducted at the Eastwood City Walk of Fame in 2012, in addition to numerous nominations from FAMAS Awards, Gawad Urian, Luna and Golden Screen TV Awards.

== Career ==
Locsin was launched to stardom in Regal Films' Disgrasyada (1978) which became a huge box-office hit. Since then, she was given roles which are sexy like Menor de Edad (1979), Love Affair (1979), Ina, Kapatid, Anak (1979), Rissa Jones (1979), Stepsisters (1979), Waikiki (1980), Disco Madhouse (1980), Manila by Night (1980), Unang Yakap (1980), Kambal sa Uma (1980), Kasalanan Ba (1981), among others.

She also had the privilege of transforming to Darna via the low-budgeted, poorly-directed Bira, Darna, Bira (1979) with Romnick Sarmenta as Ding. In 1982, she essayed the role of a ghost in Haplos (1982) playing support to Vilma Santos. Other memorable roles were in movies, Salawahan (1979), Working Girls (1984), Soltero (1984), Kailan Tama ang Mali? (1985), Kapag Puso ang Sinugatan (1985) and Huwag Mo kaming Isumpa (1985).

In 1981 to 1982, she top-billed an afternoon drama show over GMA-7 entitled, Hiyas.

As a commercial model, she endorsed, "San-ing" and "Lyna" medicated products, including Bax jeans during the late 70s until early 80s.

She attended Siena College in Quezon City.

In 2012, Locsin was inducted at the Eastwood City's Walk of Fame for her contribution to Philippine film industry. She was recognized as one of the prominent sex goddesses of the late 70s. As a seasoned actress, Locsin has garnered multiple nominations from FAMAS and Gawad Urian Awards. In 2009, she bagged the "Best Supporting Actress" award at the 5th Cinema One Originals Digital Movie Film Festival.

As a film actress she has starred in lead roles through the 70s 80s and 90s in the late 90s she starred in Daytime dramas such as Kadenang Kristal and Mula sa Puso between 1995 and 1999 and in 1999 was tapped to portray Katrina in Marinella, replacing Hilda Koronel as the main antagonist of the series. She ventured in many Primetime Television dramas and in 2006, she starred in more Television dramas memorably as Edad in Gulong Ng Palad remake on ABS-CBN and 2007 she starred as a antiheroine in Pangarap Na Bituin in 2007 she starred in the hit tv series Margarita as she ventured away she did more roles then ever. Her public marriage to actor Al Tantay dissolved.

== Personal life ==
Locsin is native of Gapan, Nueva Ecija.

She married Al Tantay, but they separated after a few years. She remarried to a former basketball player turned Evangelical Christian pastor, Padim Israel. She has three daughters.

== Filmography ==
=== Film ===
Year	Title	Role
1979	Bedspacers	
1979	Salawahan	
1979	Ina Kapatid Anak	Erlinda
1979	Disgrasyada	Maria
1979	Kambal sa Uma	Vira and Ela
1979	Bira, Darna, Bira!	Narda/Darna
1980	Manila by Night	Bea
1981	Kasalanan Ba?	Elvira "Elvie" Santos
1982	Haplos	Auring
1984	Working Girls	Sabel Rosales
1986	Bagets Gang	Hilda Lacson
1986	Kailan Tama ang Mali	Helen
1986	Working Boys	Jill
1987	Balweg	Azon
1995	Sarah... Ang Munting Prinsesa	Amelia
1997	Calvento Files: The Movie	Nilda
1999	Bayaning 3rd World	Trinidad "Trining" Rizal
2004	Minsan Pa	Pacing
2006	You Are the One	Myra Ramos-Garcia
2010	Amigo	Corazon Dacanay
2010	Paano Na Kaya	Tessie Chua
2010	Working Girls	Sabel Rosales
2014	She's Dating the Gangster	Athena Abigail's Mom
2015	The Breakup Playlist	Marissa David

=== Television ===
Year	Title(s)	Role(s)
1987–1989	Sitak ni Jack	
1995–1996	Kadenang Kristal	Rosenda
1997–1999	Mula sa Puso	Corazon Bermudez-Rodrigo
1999–2001	Marinella	Katrina Rodriguez-Villareal
2002–2003	Ang Iibigin ay Ikaw	Citas Almendras
2003	Maynila	Various
2003	Buttercup	Elsa
2003	Maalaala Mo Kaya: Unan	Dr. Perla Postigo
2004	Mangarap Ka	Jacqueline Catacutan Carter
2006	Gulong ng Palad	Caridad "Idad" Santos
2006	Komiks Presents: Da Adventures of Pedro Penduko	Virgie
2006	Crazy for You	Melba
2007	Boys Nxt Door	Nanay Myrna
2007	Margarita	Adora Trinidad
2007	Pangarap na Bituin	Lena Ramirez
2008	Sineserye Presents: Maligno	Selya Cortez
2009	Komiks Presents: Flash Bomba	Rhodora Legazpi
2009	Kambal sa Uma	Milagros Perea
2009	Maalaala Mo Kaya: Lubid	Jerome's mother
2010	Habang May Buhay	Cora Alcantara
2010	Maalaala Mo Kaya: School Building	Belinda Cruz
2010	Claudine: Bingit Ng Kaligayahan	Elija
2010	Maalaala Mo Kaya: Silbato	Azon
2010–2011	Grazilda	Matilda
2011	Pablo S. Gomez's Machete	Divina Lucero
2011	Rod Santiago's The Sisters	Socorro Santiago
2011	Maalaala Mo Kaya: Passbook	Anita
2012	Maalaala Mo Kaya: Gayuma	Alicia
2012	Magpakailanman: The Glaiza de Castro Story	Glaiza's mother
2012	Magpakailanman: The Zendee Rose Story	Jinky Tenerefe
2012	Makapiling Kang Muli	Mara Silvestre-Valencia
2012	My Beloved	Lily
2012–2013	Temptation of Wife	Minda Santos
2013	Maalaala Mo Kaya: Medalya	Carlos' mother
2013	Kahit Nasaan Ka Man	Pauline's mother
2014	The Legal Wife	Eloisa Santiago
2014	Ikaw Lamang	Guadalupe "Lupe" Roque-Dela Cruz
2014	My Destiny	Amalia
2015	Wansapanataym: My Kung Fu Chinito	Malu Calasiao
2015	Flordeliza	Imelda Maristela
2015	My Faithful Husband	Carmen Fernandez
2016	Dolce Amore	Pilita "Taps" Ibarra
2017	My Dear Heart	Lucing Magdangal-Estanislao
2018	Bagani	Dandan
2018–2019	Ngayon at Kailanman	Rosa Mapendo
2019	Kargo	Lola Tere
2019–2020	Home Sweetie Home: Extra Sweet	Tita Oya
2020–2021	Bagong Umaga	Hilda Veradona
2022–2023	Mars Ravelo's Darna	Roberta Ferrer-Custodio
2023–2024	Black Rider	Alma Guerrero
2025	It’s Okay to Not Be Okay	Nanay Liwanag
2026	The Master Cutter	Cita

== Awards and nominations ==
Awards and nominations received by Rio Locsin
Award (Note: Awards, festivals, honors and other miscellaneous organizations are listed in alphabetical order.)	Year (Note: Indicates the year of ceremony. Each year is linked to the article about the awards held that year, wherever possible.)	Category	Nominated work	Result	Ref.
Cinema One Originals Digital Film Festival	2009	Best Supporting Actress	Si Baning, si Maymay at Ang Asong si Bobo	Won	
Eastwood City Walk of Fame	2012	Inductee	Herself	Won	
FAMAS Awards	1983	Best Supporting Actress	Haplos	Nominated	
FAMAS Awards	1987	Best Supporting Actress	Huwag Mo Kaming Isumpa	Nominated	
FAMAS Awards	2007	Best Supporting Actress	Don't Give Up On Us	Nominated	
Gawad Pasado Awards	2016	Best Supporting Actress	Iisa	Nominated	
Gawad Urian Awards	1981	Best Actress	Manila by Night	Nominated	
Gawad Urian Awards	2011	Best Supporting Actress	Amigo	Nominated	
Gawad Urian Awards	2016	Best Supporting Actress	Iisa	Nominated	
Golden Screen TV Awards	2005	Outstanding Supporting Actress in a Drama Special	Maalaala Mo Kaya ("Skating Rink")	Nominated	
Jeepney TV Fan Favorite Awards	2022	Fave Momshie/Mamita	Various roles	Nominated	
Luna Awards	2016	Best Supporting Actress	The Breakup Playlist	Nominated	
PMPC Star Awards for Television	2000	Best Drama Actress	Marinella	Nominated	
PMPC Star Awards for Television	2011	Best Single Performance by an Actress	Maalaala Mo Kaya ("Silbato")	Nominated	
PMPC Star Awards for Television	2025	Best Drama Supporting Actress	Black Rider	Nominated	
Urduja Film Festival	2016	Best Supporting Actress	Bambanti	Won	
Young Critics Circle	2001	Best Performance	Bayaning 3rd World	Nominated	
