= Working Girls (1984 film) =

1984 comedy-drama film by Ishmael Bernal

- Directed by: Ishmael Bernal
- Written by: Amado Lacuesta Jr.
- Produced by: Ramon Salvador
- Starring: Hilda Koronel; Rio Locsin; Chanda Romero; Gina Pareño; Maria Isabel Lopez; Carmi Martin; Baby Delgado; Tommy Abuel
- Cinematography: Manolo R. Abaya
- Edited by: Ike Jarlego Jr.
- Music by: Willy Cruz
- Distributed by: Viva Films
- Release date: June 7, 1984
- Running time: 118 minutes
- Country: Philippines
- Languages: Filipino; English

Working Girls is a 1984 Philippine comedy-drama film directed by Ishmael Bernal and written by Amado L. Lacuesta Jr. in his first foray into screenwriting. Starring Hilda Koronel, Chanda Romero, Rio Locsin, Maria Isabel Lopez, Carmi Martin, Gina Pareño, Baby Delgado and Tommy Abuel, the story features stories of women working in different roles across the Philippine financial sector at the Makati Central Business District.

Produced and distributed by Viva Films, the film was theatrically released on June 7, 1984. A sequel, Working Girls 2, was produced and released in 1987, also directed by Bernal. In 2010, Viva Films produced a remake of the film, in association with GMA Pictures and Unitel Pictures, with Jose Javier Reyes as the co-writer and director.

== Plot ==
Sabel works as the secretary for Carla, the only female vice president of Premium Bank. Sabel has an affair with another bank executive, Raul, a playboy who is engaged to Amanda, the executive of another banking firm. At Amanda's firm, the receptionist Rose is mired in debt, while a manager, Anne, struggles to maintain her career while being a housewife and a mistress to another executive, Eddie. In between, Nimfa, an ambitious jewelry seller, stalks the Makati CBD to find customers and a man who could introduce her to high society, while Suzanne, a flirtatious yet accident-prone assistant, switches employment rapidly in her search for attractive executives.

Anne, a well-educated bank manager, is nagged by her deadbeat husband Tony for her absence from the house. She offers to resign, only to withdraw when she is offered a series of promotions. Anne chastises Tony for lashing out at her over his failure to retain a job and other insecurities. However, Tony discovers Anne's affair with Eddie, leading to a fracas between the two men at Anne's office. Anne finally resigns out of shame.

At the suggestion of her friend Khris, Rose tries out moonlighting as a call girl for Makati executives. She and one of her clients fall in love and become engaged, but the engagement is called off when her would-be father-in-law reveals that he had previously availed of her services. Afterwards, Rose continues to be a call girl with Khris' help.

Carla becomes wary when Jefferson Yap, a novice businessman, applies for a loan from Premium Bank. Her suspicions are raised when she learns that Jefferson has been rapidly accumulating debt, but is voted down by the patriarchal board of directors. Carla is vindicated when Jefferson's companies collapse, triggering a financial panic that Carla manages to control by limiting the loan provided by Premium Bank to Jefferson beforehand. In recognition for her efforts, she is promoted as senior vice president, at the cost of her breaking up with her boyfriend, Roy, due to her increased workload. Suzanne loses her job in Premium Bank amid the crisis and ends up being assistant to another executive, Danny; they eventually become a couple despite Suzanne's incompetence.

Sabel suddenly throws up at Carla's office and realizes that she is pregnant. She despairs when Raul casually suggests that she undertake an abortion. Sabel, who is also bullied by her male colleagues, breaks down in front of Carla and reveals her pregnancy when the latter notices that she has been slacking at work. Carla tells her to stand up for herself and blackmails Raul into giving alimony to Isabel in exchange for her not sabotaging his engagement to Amanda. Sabel decides to keep the child and not have Raul acknowledged as the father in exchange for his child support.

Nimfa stumbles upon Raul and Amanda at the latter's office. Sensing an opportunity, Nimfa breaks into Amanda's home and propositions herself over Raul. Over the succeeding days, Nimfa blackmails Raul and hires two of her indebted customers to intimidate Raul into providing hush money to Nimfa in exchange for her silence. After he agrees on a one-time payoff to Nimfa, Raul's wedding goes off without incident, while Sabel, fed up with being bullied, assaults her tormentors over lunch and storms off triumphantly.

== Cast ==
- Hilda Koronel as Carla Asuncion
- Rio Locsin as Sabel Rosales
- Chanda Romero as Anne
- Gina Pareño as Nimfa Sugcang
- Maria Isabel Lopez as Rose
- Carmi Martin as Suzanne Galang
- Baby Delgado as Amanda Luna
- Tommy Abuel as Raul Leuterio
- Robert Arevalo as Eddie
- Edu Manzano as Danny Prado
- Romeo Rivera as Tony
- Joel Lamangan as Khris
- Johnny Wilson as Bernie Cordero
- Roy Alvarez as Roy
- Cesar Montano as office bully
- Zorayda Sanchez as office worker

== Production ==
The film was directed by Ishmael Bernal and written by Amado Lacuesta, who had experience working in the Makati business community. It was made and released amid a real-life banking crisis. The film's theme song was made by Mon del Rosario and Chona Cruz and derived from her album Nonstop.

== Release and reception ==
The film was a critical and commercial success at the time of its release. Subsequent reviews focused on it being one of the earliest films of the time that dealt with the corporate sector as well as its portrayal of office workers preparing confetti out of phone book pages that were used in rallies against the dictatorship of Ferdinand Marcos.

== Accolades ==
Accolades received by Love You So Bad
Award ceremony	Year	Category	Recipient(s)	Result	Ref.
Gawad Urian Awards	1984	Best Actress	Gina Pareño	Nominated	

== Sequel ==
The film spawned a sequel, also titled Working Girls, which was directed by Jose Javier Reyes and released in 2010 and saw Martin, Pareño, Lopez, and Locsin reprise their roles.
