= Lorna Tolentino =

Filipino actress and film producer (born 1961)

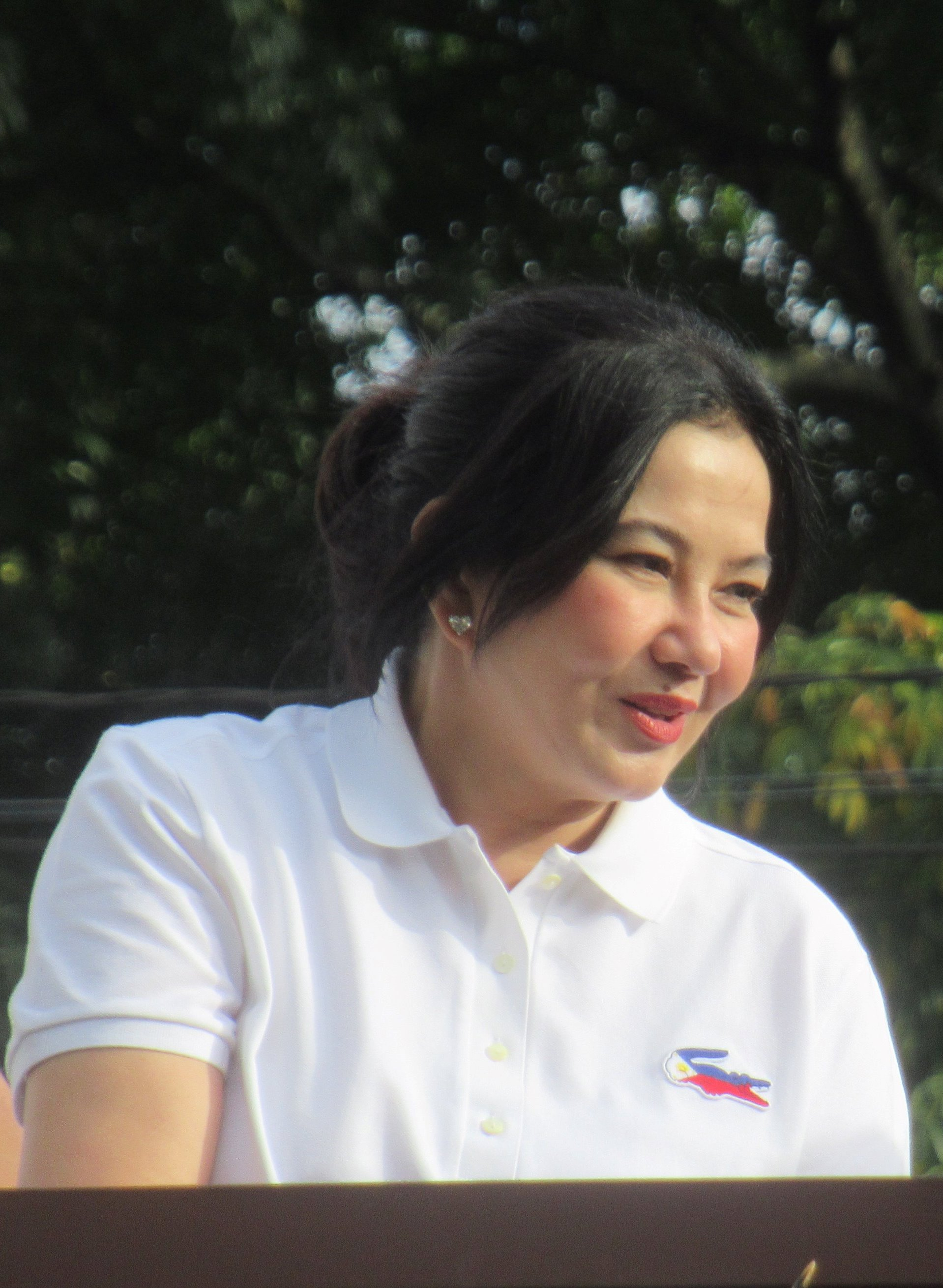
- Tolentino in 2024
- Born: Victoria Lorna Perez Aluquin; December 23, 1961 (age 64); Concepcion, Tarlac, Philippines
- Other name: L.T.
- Occupations: Actress; film producer; television personality; model
- Years active: 1969–present
- Spouse: Rudy Fernandez (m. 1983; died 2008)
- Children: 2, including Renz
- Relatives: Jef Gaitan (daughter-in-law)
- Awards: Full list

Victoria Lorna Perez Aluquin-Fernandez (born December 23, 1961), better known by her stage name Lorna Tolentino, sometimes known by her initials L.T., is a Filipino actress, model, film producer and television personality. Dubbed by the media as the "Prime Star", she is known for her dramatic roles in film and television and was the fourth actress to achieve the Grandslam status for her performance in the film Narito ang Puso Ko (1992). With a career spanning five decades, she has already appeared in 100 motion pictures and is cited by critics as one of the greatest Filipino actresses in Philippine cinema. She has received numerous accolades, including seven FAMAS Awards, four Luna Awards, a Gawad Urian Award, and two commendations from the Asian Television Awards.

== Early life ==
Lorna Tolentino was born as Victoria Lorna Perez Aluquin on December 23, 1961, in Concepcion, Tarlac and later moved to Manila. Her father, Amado Aluquin, is from Liliw, Laguna. She is also the stepmother of actor Mark Anthony Fernandez. She is first cousin to actress Amy Perez, Zsa Zsa Padilla and a niece of actor Jerry Pons. She was married to actor Rudy Fernandez from 1983 until his death in 2008. They have two sons.

She attended the elementary grades at St. Anthony School where she also finished high school. She took up a Bachelor of Arts course at St. Paul College in Quezon City, and also at the University of Santo Tomas and Maryknoll College (now Miriam College).

== Career ==
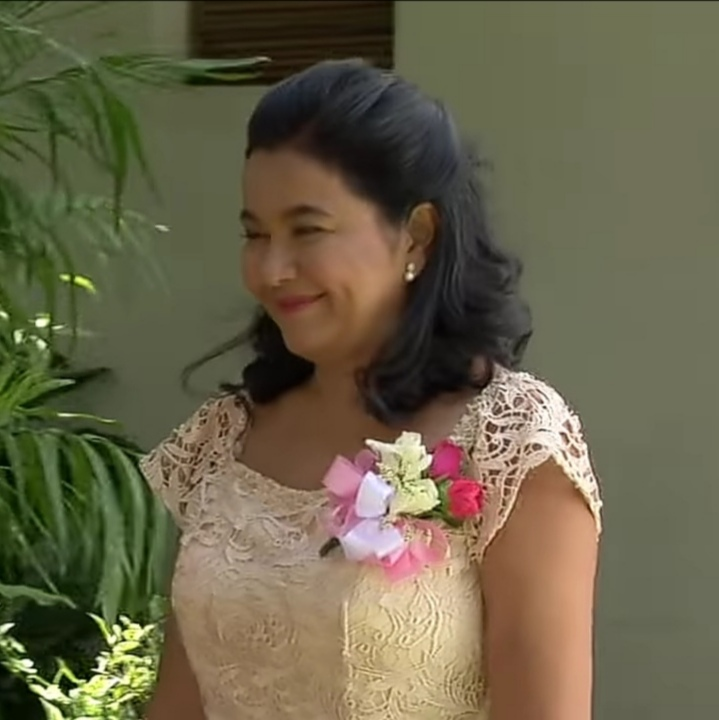
Tolentino in an Eat Bulaga! special Lenten episode in 2017.

She started her career as a child actress. Later, she portrayed the young Susan Roces in Divina Gracia and has a total of at least 60 movies. She has won eight film awards and garnered 20 nominations (mostly for Best Actress in FAMAS).

Her notable performances were Uod at Rosas (1981), Moral (1982), Sinasamba Kita (1982), Init sa Magdamag (1983), Somewhere (1984), Huwag Mo Kaming Isumpa (1986), Nakagapos Na Puso (1986), Pinulot Ka Lang sa Lupa (1987), Natutulog Ba ang Diyos (1988). In 2002, Tolentino starred in her first Primetime Drama Kay Tagal Kang Hinintay the first time Tolentino starred in a teleserye. In 2004-2008 she went to GMA Network to star in Hanggang Kailan and host Startalk to replace Rosanna Roces.

Tolentino returned to ABS-CBN to star with an ensemble cast in Dahil May Isang Ikaw, which earned her more praise. In 2010, she starred in the TV drama Momay, and in 2011, she starred in Minsan Lang Kita Iibigin with an ensemble cast.

She is also one of the Grandslam actresses in Philippine Cinema together with Vilma Santos, Elizabeth Oropesa, Nora Aunor and Sharon Cuneta. She won her Grandslam Best Actress for Narito ang Puso Ko (1993). She went back to her original network, GMA Network, to star in the upcoming heavy drama series Pahiram ng Sandali.

In May 2001, Tolentino participated in the protests of EDSA III, which called for Joseph Estrada's return to the Philippine presidency.

Tolentino is also known for her dramatic roles in television dramas. In 2002–2003, she was cast in the suspense drama series Kay Tagal Kang Hinintay as Lorrea/Lorrinda Guinto/Red Butterfly, a lead role which successfully set Philippine Primetime TV Standards and a successful finale.

In 2009–2010, Tolentino stopped doing TV series and instead focused on full-length films. On occasions, she participated as a TV host. She came back to reclaim her throne when she played the role of Atty. Tessa Ramirez in the popular soap opera Dahil May Isang Ikaw which won her more accolades in the New York Television Awards for Best Telenovela.

In 2011, she starred in the action-drama television series Minsan Lang Kita Iibigin, where she played a villain as Alondra Sebastiano. She later left the network and starred in the television drama Glamorosa.

In 2012, Tolentino did the soap opera Pahiram ng Sandali with GMA-7 with actor Dingdong Dantes, Christopher de Leon and Max Collins. She was included in the cast of Valiente and the weekly series Third Eye both airing on TV5.

In 2014, Tolentino had a small part in the GMA Network series, Genesis again with Dingdong Dantes.

In 2015, she starred with Ruffa Gutierrez and Gelli de Belen in Misterless Misis on TV5.

In 2018, Tolentino came back to ABS-CBN after five years to do the daytime series Asintado. After Asintado, Tolentino played the villainous and authoritarian bureaucrat-first lady turned warlord Lily Ann Cortez-Hidalgo on ABS-CBN's FPJ's Ang Probinsyano, topbilled by Coco Martin and reunited again with Martin in FPJ's Batang Quiapo as the anti-heroic syndicate leader Amanda Salonga.

== Acting style and reception ==
Lorna Tolentino - as we all know - is one of the finest actresses in Philippine cinema. She's a grand-slam queen capable of displaying emotions ranging from A-Z.

— Butch Francisco from Philippine Star on Lorna Tolentino (2000).

Tolentino "has been known to practice emotional restraint in her acting." In 2004, the Directors’ Guild of the Philippines Inc. have listed her among the "15 Best Filipino Actresses of All Time". In 2006, S Magazine also included her in their list of "Philippine Cinema’s 15 Best Actresses of All Time" voted by film directors, scriptwriters and journalists. In a special episode of QTV's Ang Pinaka hosted by Pia Guanio, her dialogue with Alice Dixson in the 1988 film Nagbabagang Luha was included in their list of "20 Most Unforgettable Filipino Movie Quotes of All Time." Critic Elvin Luciano praised her portrayal in the 2010 film Sa 'Yo Lamang saying: "LT has mastered her craft, and at the same time, effectively supports her co-stars." Abigail Mendoza of Philippine Entertainment Portal praised her performance in the film Burgos (2013) saying: "Tolentino effectively evokes empathy with her subtle but compelling portrayal of Edita Burgos", further adding: "The actress shines in bringing life to the subdued but resilient heroine of the biopic, making her audience feel that a mother’s love is indeed so powerful." Edita Burgos herself praised Tolentino's portrayal saying: "It’s not only very accurate, it’s a very sensitive portrayal not only during the lonely and sorrowful moments but even the joyful experience with the children. It's very beautiful."

=== Reception ===
Tolentino has been described as the "Grandslam Queen" by various media outlets. She is the second most nominated actress in a leading role at the FAMAS Awards history (behind Nora Aunor) having been nominated 16 times since 1988, tying the record with Lolita Rodriguez. She is also the third most nominated actress for the leading role in Gawad Urian Awards history (behind Nora Aunor and Vilma Santos), garnering 10 nominations since 1983. She starred with the ensemble cast in the 2009 series Dahil May Isang Ikaw. According to AGB Neilsen, the series attained 33.6% TV ratings in Mega Manila, earned a nomination at the International Emmy Awards in the Best Telenovela category and premiered in more than ten countries globally including Colombia, becoming the second Filipino content to air in Latin America. Yes! Magazine have included Tolentino in their annual list of 100 Most Beautiful Stars in 2009, 2010, 2013, and 2015. Among the local celebrities who expressed admiration towards Tolentino include Tootsie Guevara.

== Filmography ==
=== Film ===
Year	Title	Role
1970	Divina Gracia	
1970	Mga Anghel Na Walang Langit	Nena
1972	My Little One	
1973	Pag-ibig Mo, Buhay Ko!	
1974	Biyenan Ko Ang Aking Anak	Marilou
1975	Langit Ko... Ang Pag-ibig Mo	
1976	Boss, Basta Ikaw (Wa 'Na 'Ko Sey)	
1976	Sapagkat Kami'y Tao Lamang: Part 2	
1978	Gorgonya	
1978	Miss Dulce Amor, Ina	
1978	Esmeralda at Ruby	
1978	Paano ang Gabi Kung Wala Kana	
1978	Katawang Alabok	Katrina Walston
1979	Dalaga	
1979	Sa Putik Ihuhugas ang Dugo	
1979	Midnight Show	
1979	Iskandalo!	Norma Campos
1979	Nang Umapoy ang Karagatan	
1979	Mga Huwad Na Mananayaw	
1979	Stepsisters	
1979	Aliw	Lingling
1979	Star?	
1980	4 Na Maria	
1980	City After Dark	Baby
1980	Disco Madhouse	
1980	Uhaw sa Kalayaan	
1980	Sa Init ng Apoy	
1980	Waikiki: Sa Lupa ng Ating Mga Pangarap	
1980	Mamang Sorbetero	
1980	Waikiki	
1981	Tropang Bulilit	
1981	Cover Girls	
1981	Diosa	
1981	Wild	
1981	Caught in the Act	
1982	Uod at Rosas	
1982	Sinasamba Kita	Nora
1982	Dormitoryo: Buhay Estudyante	Cynthia
1982	Moral	Joey
1982	Kumander Elpidio Paclibar	
1983	Init sa Magdamag	Becky Claudio / Leah Sanchez
1983	Sana, Bukas Pa ang Kahapon	
1983	Vendetta	
1984	Somewhere	Shirley Morena
1985	Hello Lover, Goodbye Friend	
1985	Hindi Nahahati ang Langit	Melody
1985	Muling Buksan ang Puso	
1985	Ina, Kasusuklaman Ba Kita?	Rizzy
1986	Huwag Mo Kaming Isumpa	
1986	Nakagapos Na Puso	Eliza Fajardo
1987	Pinulot Ka Lang sa Lupa	Santina
1987	Maging Akin Ka Lamang	Rosita Monteverde
1988	Nagbabagang Luha	Maita
1988	Natutulog Pa ang Diyos	Gillian Ramirez
1989	Kailan Mahuhugasan ang Kasalanan?	Monica Escudero
1990	Tiny Terrestrial: The Three Professors	Prof. Carla Presto-Eyestyle
1990	Higit Na Matimbang ang Dugo	
1990	Ayaw Matulog Ng Gabi	
1991	Kislap sa Dilim	Ciena
1992	Narito ang Puso Ko	Helen
1993	Gaano Kita Kamahal	Auring Suclad
1993	Kung Ako'y Iiwan Mo	Winnie Martin
1994	The Elsa Santos Castillo (The Chop-chop Lady) Story	Elsa Santos Castillo
1995	Sa Ngalan ng Pag-ibig	Mae
1995	Sigaw ng Puso	Nikki
1995	Patayin sa Sindak si Barbara	Barbara
1995	Emergency Call	
1996	Kristo	Veronica
1996	May Nagmamahal Sa'yo	Louella
1996	Bayarang Puso	Juliet Sanvictores
1996	Wag na Wag Kang Lalayo	Victoria
1997	Hanggang Kailan Kita Mamahalin	Lisa Reyes
1998	Pusong Mamon	Annie
1999	Luksong Tinik	Beth Pineda
2000	Yakapin Mo ang Umaga	Ria
2000	Ping Lacson, Super Cop	Alice Lacson
2001	Sugatang Puso	Celine
2001	Abakada... Ina	Estela
2003	Magnifico	Edna
2003	Utang ng Ama	Doctora
2003	Mano Po 2: My Home	Belinda
2005	Lovestruck	Cocoy and Myka's mother
2006	Mano Po 5: Gua Ai Di	Yolanda
2007	Katas ng Saudi	Marcy
2010	Sa 'yo Lamang	Amanda Alvero
2011	Ang Panday 2	Baruka
2013	Burgos	Edith Burgos
2015	Crazy Beautiful You	Dra. Lea Serrano
2015	Felix Manalo	Attending Physician
2015	The Last Pinoy Action King	Herself
2015	#WalangForever	Betchay Nolasco
2017	Kamandag ng Droga	
2024	Espantaho	Rosa
2025	I'mPerfect	Lizel
2026	A Werewolf Boy	Older Sara

=== Television ===
Year	Title	Role	Notes	Ref.
1977	Darna	Darna		
1987	Trianggulo		Television film	
1993	Star Drama Theater Presents: Lorna	Various roles		
1994	Ready, Get Set, Go!	Herself - Host		
1997	NegoSyete	Herself - Co-host		
1999	1 for 3	Yugie		
1999–2000	Liwanag ng Hatinggabi	Amanda		
2002–2003	Kay Tagal Kang Hinintay	Lorrea Guinto / Lea Mijares		
2002–2003	Kay Tagal Kang Hinintay	Lorrinda Gunto / Ingrid Medrano / Red Butterfly		
2003	All About You	Herself - Host		
2004	30 Days	Herself - Host		
2004	Hanggang Kailan	Valerie Rosales		
2005	Darna	Queen Adran		
2005–2006	Sugo	Amelia		
2006	O, Mare Ko!	Victoria "Vicky"		
2006	Now and Forever: Linlang	Lorena Castrillo		
2007	StarStruck: The Next Level	Herself - Council member		
2007–2008	Zaido: Pulis Pangkalawakan	Helen Lorenzo / Shanara		
2009	Maalaala Mo Kaya	Miriam	Episode: "Chess"	
2009–2010	May Bukas Pa	Miriam		
2009–2010	Dahil May Isang Ikaw	Tessa Ramirez		
2010	Momay	Shirley Buenavidez		
2011	Minsan Lang Kita Iibigin	Alondra Sebastiano-del Tierro		
2011–2012	Glamorosa	Dra. Natalia Herrera-Marciano / Dra. Natalia Lustico		
2012	Pidol's Wonderland	Mia	Episode: "Moomoo Mia"	
2012	Valiente	Milagros "Mila" De Jesus Regalado-Ilagan / Mila Ilagan-Arden		
2012	Third Eye	Rosanna		
2012	Artista Academy	Herself - Judge		
2012–2013	Pahiram ng Sandali	Janice Alvaro-Reyes		
2013	Cassandra: Warrior Angel	Jana Alcuaz		
2013	Home Sweet Home	Azon		
2013	The Ryzza Mae Show	Herself		
2013	Magpakailanman	Susan Maniego		
2013	Genesis	President Sandra Sebastian-Trinidad		
2014	My Destiny	Agnes dela Rosa		
2015	Misterless Misis	Jenny		
2016	Yan ang Morning!	Herself		
2017	Maalaala Mo Kaya	Maya	Episode: "Love Behind Bars"	
2017	Eat Bulaga Lenten Special	Judit Peña	Episode: "Pagpapatawad"	
2018	Asintado	Miranda Ojeda		
2018	Barangay 143	Kapitana Baby dela Cruz	Dubbed voice	
2019–2022	FPJ's Ang Probinsyano	First Lady Lily Ann Cortez-Hidalgo		
2019	Call Me Tita	Josefa "Josa" Orosa		
2023–2025	FPJ's Batang Quiapo	Amanda Salonga		
2025–2026	Roja	Greta Roja		
2026	A Secret in Prague	Mama Yaya / Vicky Corales		

=== As producer/executive producer ===
- Kaaway ng Batas (1990)
- Kislap sa Dilim (1991)
- Kamay ni Kain (1992)
- Kahit Buhay Ko (1992)
- Matimbang Pa sa Dugo (1995)
- Itataya Ko ang Buhay Ko (1996)
- Hula Mo, Huli Ko (2002)
- I'mPerfect (2025)

== See also ==
- List of Filipino actresses
- Cinema of the Philippines
- Television in the Philippines
