= Scorpio Nights =

1985 erotic thriller film by Peque Gallaga

- Theatrical poster of the film in monochrome.
- Directed by: Peque Gallaga
- Screenplay by: Rosauro Q. Dela Cruz
- Story by: T.E. Pagaspas; Romel Bernardino
- Produced by: Lily Yu Monteverde
- Starring: Daniel Fernando; Orestes Ojeda; Anna Marie Gutierrez
- Cinematography: Ely Cruz
- Edited by: Jesus M. Navarro
- Music by: Jaime Fabregas; Nonong Buencamino
- Production company: Regal Films
- Distributed by: Regal Entertainment
- Release date: June 18, 1985
- Running time: 126 minutes
- Country: Philippines
- Languages: Filipino; English; Hiligaynon

Scorpio Nights is a 1985 Philippine erotic thriller film directed by Peque Gallaga and written by Rosauro "Uro" Q. Dela Cruz from a story concept developed by T.E. Pagaspas and art director Romel Bernardino. Starring Orestes Ojeda, Anna Marie Gutierrez, and Daniel Fernando in his acting debut, the story follows a love affair between a young man and a married woman who become entangled in their uncontrollable urge for sex. It also features Dwight Gaston, Pen Medina, Angelo Castro Jr., and some of the film's production staff including writer-director Rosauro "Uro" Q. Dela Cruz and art director Rommel Bernardino in supporting and special participatory roles.

Produced and distributed by Regal Films, the film was theatrically released on June 18, 1985. While it was controversial, it played a key role in defining Filipino erotic films of the decade. Following its release, two standalone sequels (both produced by rival film studio, Viva Films) were produced in 1999 and 2022, while a South Korean remake was produced and released in 2001.

== Plot ==
The film is set in a shabby apartment where college student Danny resides above the room of a security guard and his wife. Every day, the husband goes home, eats his dinner, washes the dishes, goes straight to bed, and has sex with his wife. Danny plays Peeping Tom and every night observes through a hole in his floorboard. Unable to control his urges, he goes to his wife's room, where he does the same things that the husband does to her with no resistance. The two perform the act repeatedly until they fall in love with each other. The husband finds out that his wife is cheating on him when one day he walks in on them while they are having sex, and shoots them both. He then shoots himself while having sex with his dead wife.

== Cast ==
- Orestes Ojeda as Security Guard
- Anna Marie Gutierrez as Security Guard's wife
- Daniel Fernando as Danny
- Amanda Amores as Fely
- Eugene Enriquez as Genio
- Crispin Medina as Pen (Barkada #1)
- Rosauro "Uro" dela Cruz as Barkada #2
- Lorenzo "Lore" A. Reyes as Barkada #3
- Rafael "Apol" Salonga as Barkada #4
- Mike Austria as Mike
- Carlos "Caloy" Balasbas as Elton
- Carlito Abracia as Carlo
- Jed Abroleda as Ilonggo Student #1
- Dwight Gaston as Ilonggo Student #2
- Erin John Martir as Ilonggo Student #3
- Angelo Castro Jr. as Police Director
- Rommel Bernardino as Security Guard's Friend
- Chuck Ontal as Drug Addict
- Arbie Antonio as Taxi Driver
- Peque Gallaga as Fely's Father
- Madeleine Gallaga as Fely's Mother

== Production ==
The film was one of several funded by the Experimental Cinema of the Philippines, a government-owned and controlled corporation then headed by Imee Marcos.

=== Casting ===
The role of Danny was originally offered by project coordinator Douglas Quijano and Regal Films founder Lily Monteverde to then-matinee idol Richard Gomez, but he turned down the role because he was unable to do nude scenes.

According to Daniel Fernando when he was interviewed by Boy Abunda in his show Tonight with Boy Abunda, he was a student at the University of the East in that time when he was discovered by a talent coordinator in the audition and he would later introduce to Peque Gallaga, the film's director. To prepare for his role, he participated in the acting workshop for one month including the workshop dealing with scenes that contain nudity where he was already comfortable at.

== Reception ==
=== Legacy ===
The film is considered one of the most controversial and important Filipino films of its time. Despite being provocative, it has been commended for its social relevance. Set towards the beginning of the end of the Marcos regime, it portrayed the chaotic economy of those years, when street protests related to Ninoy Aquino's assassination were still ongoing.

=== Critical reception ===
In the retrospective review by film critic Noel Vera, the sensual scenes of Scorpio Nights were directly similar to Nagisa Oshima's controversial 1976 film In the Realm of the Senses but Gallaga only outshines Oshima in terms of psychological realism and suspense.

== Sequel ==
A standalone sequel, Peque Gallaga's Scorpio Nights 2, was released on February 2, 1999. It starred Albert Martinez and Joyce Jimenez and was directed by Erik Matti under VIVA Films, with Gallaga serving as producer. The film earned ₱60 million at the Philippine box-office. Another sequel, Scorpio Nights 3 starring Christine Bermas, Mark Anthony Fernandez, and Gold Aceron was released on July 29, 2022. It was produced by Peque Gallaga and directed by Lawrence Fajardo under Vivamax.

== Remake ==
The 2001 Korean film Summertime is based on this movie.
