= Nagbabagang Luha (TV series) =

2021 Philippine television drama series

- Title card
- Also known as: Flames of Love
- Genre: Drama
- Based on: Nagbabagang Luha (1988) by Ishmael Bernal
- Written by: Onay Sales; Renato Custodio Jr.; Maria Zita S. Garganera; Kenneth Angelo C. Enriquez; Liberty L. Trinidad; Loi Argel Nova
- Directed by: Ricky Davao
- Creative director: Aloy Adlawan
- Starring: Glaiza de Castro; Claire Castro
- Theme music composer: Onay Sales; Natasha L. Correos
- Opening theme: "Walang Hanggan" by Jessica Villarubin
- Country of origin: Philippines
- Original language: Tagalog
- No. of episodes: 72 (list of episodes)

Production
- Executive producer: Winnie Hollis-Reyes
- Editors: Mark Anthony T. Valderrama; Ver Custodio
- Camera setup: Multiple-camera setup
- Running time: 23–29 minutes
- Production company: GMA Entertainment Group

Original release
- Network: GMA Network
- Release: August 2 – October 23, 2021

Nagbabagang Luha (transl. smoldering tears / international title: Flames of Love) is a 2021 Philippine television drama series broadcast by GMA Network. The series is based on a 1988 Philippine film of the same title. Directed by Ricky Davao, it stars Glaiza de Castro and Claire Castro. It premiered on August 2, 2021 on the network's Afternoon Prime line up. The series concluded on October 23, 2021, with a total of 72 episodes.

The series is streaming online on YouTube.

== Cast and characters ==
Cast

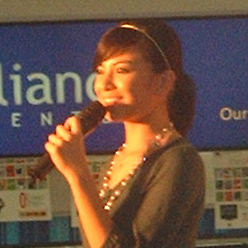
Glaiza de Castro

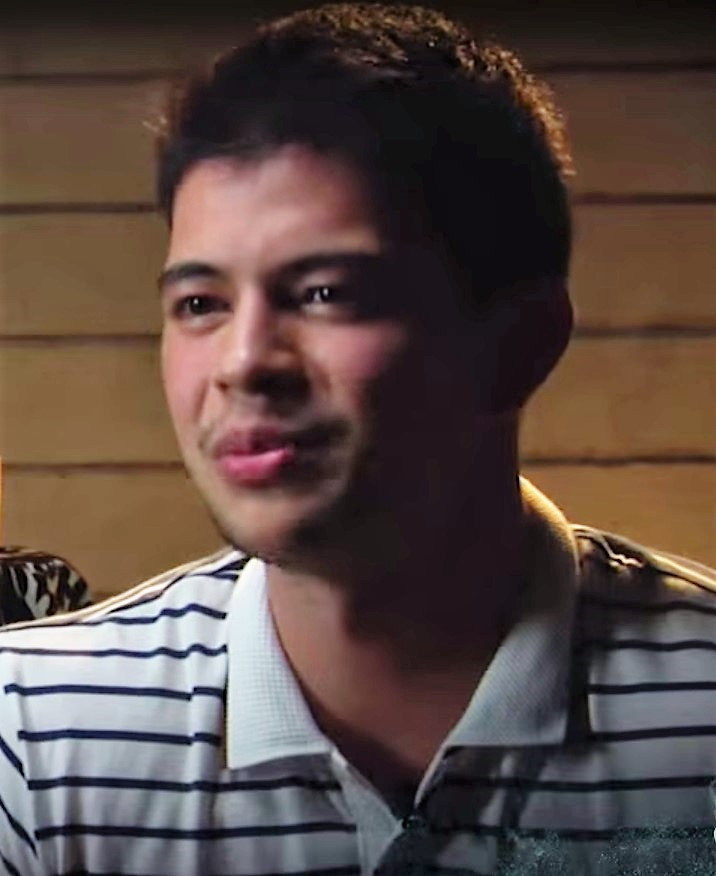
Rayver Cruz

Lead cast

- Glaiza de Castro as Maria Theresa "Maita" Ignacio-Montaire
- Claire Castro as Cielo Narissa Ignacio

Supporting cast

- Rayver Cruz as Alexander "Alex" Montaire
- Mike Tan as Aidan "Bien" de Dios-Ignacio
- Gina Alajar as Calida Montaire
- Allan Paule as Rafael "Paeng" Ignacio
- Myrtle Sarrosa as Judy Enriquez
- Archie Adamos as Levi de Dios
- Royce Cabrera as Sherwin Enriquez
- Karenina Haniel as Monina de Castro
- Ralph Noriega as Joryl
- Bryan Benedict as Lander

Guest cast

- Jaclyn Jose as Mercy Ignacio

== Production ==
Principal photography commenced in February 2021.

== Ratings ==
According to AGB Nielsen Philippines' Nationwide Urban Television Audience Measurement People in television homes, the pilot episode of Nagbabagang Luha earned a 6.2% rating, The final episode scored a 7.5% rating.
