= Mr. One-Two-Three Part 2 =

1981 comedy film starring Tito Sotto, Vic Sotto, Joey de Leon

- Directed by: Mike Relon Makiling
- Written by: Mike Relon Makiling
- Starring: Tito Sotto; Vic Sotto; Joey de Leon; Yehlen Catral; Liz Alindogan; Anna Marie Gutierrez
- Production company: GP Films
- Release date: July 31, 1981
- Country: Philippines
- Language: Filipino

Mr. One-Two-Three Part 2 (retroactively titled Mister One-Two-Three Strikes Again) is a 1981 Filipino comedy film written and directed by Mike Relon Makiling and starring the comedy trio Tito Sotto, Vic Sotto, and Joey de Leon. Based on the Pinoy Komiks characters created by L. P. Calixto, it is a sequel to the 1980 film Mr. One-Two-Three. The film was released in theaters by GP Films on July 31, 1981, and was later reissued in early April 1988. Critic Lav Diaz criticized the film as simplistically comical and cliché, with its gags already done before by Filipino comedians Dolphy, Chiquito, and Cachupoy, though he noted that it demonstrates the then-current state of comedy films produced in the Philippines. A standalone sequel of the movie called Super Wan-Tu-Tri were released in 1985, with TVJ playing different characters.

== Plot ==
Conjoined triplets Juan, Toto, and Ricky search for their father as they try to get a job in the city, only to fail every time. Eventually, a quack doctor is able to separate the three, but later they realize that they are better together.

== Cast ==
Main cast

- Tito Sotto as Juan
- Vic Sotto as Toto
- Joey de Leon as Ricky

Supporting cast

- Yehlen Catral
- Liz Alindogan
- Anna Marie Gutierrez
- Carmi Martin

== Critical response ==
Isagani Cruz, writing for Paradise, gave Mr. One-Two-Three a negative review, stating that though it is better than Bilibid Gays, which he considered "revolting", it is still "plain bad." Lav Diaz, writing for the Manila Standard, also gave the film a negative review, criticizing its rushed production ("This fails in the technical aspect") and its simplistic or cliché comedy, containing gags that have already been done by Filipino comedians Dolphy, Chiquito, and Cachupoy such as a scene involving lip-synching to a phonograph. However, he noted that the film demonstrated the then-common type of comedy films being produced in the Philippines, "those that do not need the imagination to run."
