= Manila by Night =

- Re-release poster for its screening at the Manila Film Center in 1985.
- Directed by: Ishmael Bernal
- Written by: Ishmael Bernal; Ricardo Lee
- Produced by: Lily Y. Monteverde
- Starring: Charito Solis; Alma Moreno; Rio Locsin; Cherie Gil; Lorna Tolentino; Gina Alajar; Orestes Ojeda
- Cinematography: Ely Cruz; Sergio Lobo
- Edited by: Augusto Salvador
- Music by: The Vanishing Tribe
- Production companies: Regal Films; Experimental Cinema of the Philippines
- Distributed by: Regal Films
- Release date: November 28, 1980
- Running time: 151 minutes
- Country: Philippines
- Languages: Filipino; English

Manila by Night (initially released as City After Dark) is a 1980 Filipino drama film directed by Ishmael Bernal from a script by Bernal and Ricky Lee, and stars Gina Alajar and Charito Solis. Released at the height of the Marcos regime, the film uncovers the other face of Manila by depicting the ugly aspects of life in the city – unemployment, prostitution, drug addiction and lack of decent housing. Considered one of Bernal's masterpieces, it is an epic multi-narrative of people who have shady pasts and are trying to exist in an unforgiving world.

== Plot ==
The film's events take place in the course of several nights, involving various protagonists and the city itself.

== Cast ==
- Charito Solis as Virgie
- Alma Moreno as Adelina
- Lorna Tolentino as Baby
- Rio Locsin as Bea
- Cherie Gil as Kano
- Gina Alajar as Vanessa
- Orestes Ojeda as Pebrero
- William Martinez as Alex
- Bernardo Bernardo as Manay Sharon
- Johnny Wilson as Virgie's Husband
- Jojo Santiago as Greggy Williams
- Sharon Manabat as Gaying
- Mitch Valdez (credited as Maya Valdez) as Marichu

== Production ==
Lily Monteverde of Regal Films approached Ishmael Bernal to direct a large-scale production to commemorate the second anniversary of the production outfit. Bernal had previously directed Salawahan for Monteverde's Regal Films. For the production, Bernal came up with a sequence list, based on different locales, but decided to have the scenes improvised by a cast assembled from Regal Film's stable, as well as industry friends.

== Restoration ==
The film was restored in 4K resolution by the Philippine Film Archive, the film archives division of the Film Development Council of the Philippines, and Central Digital Lab as part of the "Save Our Cinema Restoation Program". The restored version was premiered as part of the Pista ng Pelikulang Pilipino 2020 exhibition.

== Reception ==
=== Critical response ===
The film's original title is Manila by Night, but was later renamed to City After Dark for its initial release. Former first lady Imelda Marcos asked for the title to be changed and that the film be banned for export, believing that the film "maligns her city". The film has since been considered as Ishmael Bernal's masterpiece.

=== Accolades ===
Year	Group	Category	Nominee	Result
1981	Gawad Urian Awards	Best Picture	Manila by Night	Won
1981	Gawad Urian Awards	Best Actor	Bernardo Bernardo	Won
1981	Gawad Urian Awards	Best Screenplay	Ishmael Bernal	Won
1981	Gawad Urian Awards	Best Production Design	Peque Gallaga	Won
1981	Gawad Urian Awards	Best Director	Ishmael Bernal	Nominated
1981	Gawad Urian Awards	Best Actress	Cherie Gil	Nominated
1981	Gawad Urian Awards	Best Actress	Rio Locsin	Nominated
1981	Gawad Urian Awards	Best Music	Vanishing Tribe	Nominated
