= Nunal sa Tubig =

1976 drama film by Ishmael Bernal

- Poster of the restored version featuring Chedeng.

Japanese name
- Kanji: 水の中のほくろ
- Literal meaning: A Speck in the Water
Transcriptions
- Revised Hepburn: Mizu no Naka no Hokuro
- Directed by: Ishmael Bernal
- Written by: Jorge Arago
- Produced by: Jesse Ejercito
- Starring: Elizabeth Oropesa; Daria Ramirez; George Estregan
- Cinematography: Arnold Alvaro
- Edited by: Augusto Salvador
- Music by: Winston Raval
- Production company: Joseph Estrada Productions
- Distributed by: Crown Seven Film Productions (Note: The film's ownership rights is currently handled by ABS-CBN Corporation through its film studio division.); Toho (Japan)
- Release date: August 6, 1976
- Running time: 119 minutes
- Countries: Philippines; Japan (Note: The only surviving 35mm copy of the film (with Japanese subtitles) was found in Fukuoka City Library Archives and digitally scanned at Tokyo Koon Co.Ltd. in 4K.)
- Languages: Filipino; Japanese subtitles (Note: Restored 4K version only.)

Nunal sa Tubig (English: A Speck in the Water) is a 1976 Philippine drama film directed by Ishmael Bernal and written by Jorge Arago. Starring Elizabeth Oropesa, Daria Ramirez, and George Estregan, the story follows a love triangle involving a boat operator and two women in the impoverished village of Sta. Fe: a soon-to-be midwife and her best friend and neighbor.

Produced by Crown Seven Film Productions, the film was theatrically released on August 6, 1976. In 2018, the film was digitally restored and remastered by ABS-CBN Film Restoration, in partnership with Tokyo Ko-on Limited, Kantana, and Wildsound Studios.

== Plot ==
The village of Sta. Fe, located in the middle of Laguna de Bay, is known for its milkfish pens. Investors provide the capital to improve and develop this kind of business. However, the fish began to die off, prompting the villagers to salt them and dry them under the sun for financial benefit. In the village, a love triangle forms when Benjamin, owner of a boat that serves as a shuttle service to the town, falls in love with both Chedeng, a soon-to-be full-time trained midwife, and her best friend and neighbor, Maria. Neither Chedeng nor Maria knows the other is involved with Benjamin. When Maria gets pregnant, Chedeng decides Maria will be her first patient. Unfortunately, this leads to a tragic consequence, causing Chedeng to leave the village to live somewhere else.

== Cast ==
- Elizabeth Oropesa as Maria
- Daria Ramirez as Chedeng
- George Estregan as Benjamin
- Ruben Rustia as Pedro
- Pedro Faustino as Jacob
- Ella Luansing as Banang
- Rustica Carpio as Chayong
- Nenita Jana as Adiang
- Ven Medina as Mr. Blanco
- Leticia de Guzman as Ilo
- Tita De Villa as Mrs. Blanco
- Paquito Salcedo as Elder
- Lem Garcellano as Pablo
- Mart Kenneth Rebamonte as Hukluban
- Carlos Padilla Jr. as Dr. Villamaria
- Tony Carreon as Lake Analyst

=== Also starring ===
- Bong Perez
- Joey Bolisay
- Rey TablaIda Bautista
- Al Garcia
- Jimmy Preña
- Erna Menesses
- Ricky Garcia
- Milo Sario
- Santiago Balse

== Production ==
=== Filming ===
The film was shot in Laguna de Bay, which is located in the province of Laguna and the town of Binangonan, Rizal.

=== Music ===
The film's music was composed and arranged by Winston Raval, who was credited as Vanishing Tribe.

== Digital restoration ==
In the effort to restore Nunal sa Tubig by the ABS-CBN Film Restoration Project, headed by Leonardo P. Katigbak, the sole element used for the restoration was the Japanese-language-subtitled 35mm print that was stored in the audiovisual archives of the Fukuoka City Public Library Film Archives in Fukuoka City, Fukuoka, Japan. The 35mm print has been stored in the institution's archive collections since 2002, in addition to four other Filipino films acquired by the Japan Foundation.

Tokyo Ko-on Co. Ltd. in Tokyo, Japan, began the restoration by digitally scanning the 35mm print to 4K resolution, and Kantana Post-Production (Thailand) completed the digital restoration. The restored version has an aspect ratio of 1:1.85. It took 3,600 restoration hours to eliminate numerous film defects, including dust, scratches, and stains, and it was successfully completed by more than 250 professional restoration artists at Kantana Post-Production in Thailand and India. The film restoration of Nunal sa Tubig was finished in February 2018.

== Reception ==
=== Accolades ===
Year	Award-Giving Body	Category	Recipient	Result
1977	Catholic Mass Media Awards	Best Picture	Nunal sa Tubig	Won
1977	FAMAS Awards	Best Picture	Nunal sa Tubig	Nominated
1977	FAMAS Awards	Best Screenplay	Jorge Arago	Nominated
1977	FAMAS Awards	Best Director	Ishmael Bernal	Nominated
1977	FAMAS Awards	Best Actress	Daria Ramirez	Nominated
1977	FAMAS Awards	Best Cinematography	Arnold Alvaro	Nominated
1977	FAMAS Awards	Best Production Design	Betty Gosiengfiao	Nominated
1977	FAMAS Awards	Best Sound	Godofredo De Leon	Nominated
1977	Gawad Urian Awards	Best Film of the Decade (1970-1979)	Nunal sa Tubig	Honored

=== Critical response ===
Yvette Tan, writing for Manila Bulletin, wrote a mixed-to-positive retrospective review and analysis of the film. She gave praise for its artistic value, noting that what she "likes about old films is that even though they are fiction, they nonetheless offer us a glimpse into what life used to be like"; its few humorous moments amidst the isolated backdrop and gloomy story; and ABS-CBN's massive efforts to restore the film, with the help of numerous restoration artists after they discovered the sole surviving print in Japan. However, she observed that the film's portrayal of poverty, exploitation, and struggle has remained unchanged since its release, calling its lasting significance "depressingly relevant."
