= Narito ang Puso Ko =

- Official movie poster
- Directed by: Chito S. Roño
- Written by: Ricardo Lee
- Produced by: William C. Leary
- Starring: Lorna Tolentino; Gabby Concepcion
- Cinematography: Charlie Peralta; Dik Trofeo
- Edited by: Jess Navarro
- Music by: Jaime Fabregas
- Production company: Viva Films
- Distributed by: Viva Films
- Release date: September 30, 1992
- Country: Philippines
- Languages: Filipino; English

Narito ang Puso Ko (transl. My Heart Is Here) is a 1992 Filipino drama film directed by Chito S. Roño and written by Ricky Lee. The film stars Lorna Tolentino and Gabby Concepcion. Produced by Viva Films, the film was released on September 30, 1992, and was a box office success. Tolentino's performance won her the title of Grandslam Best Actress, having won all nominations for best actress across the major award giving bodies of the Philippines.

== Plot ==
A woman who regains back her veterinarian husband after their son was accidentally killed by the son of a prominent politician must also do her best to regain back the life of his comatose son to bring back the old happy life they once had.

== Cast ==
- Lorna Tolentino as Ellen Cortez Chavez
- Gabby Concepcion as Dr. Louie Chavez
- Nanette Medved as Suzette
- Amy Austria as Dolly Sanchez
- Mark Gil as Reynato "Tato" Sanchez
- Cherie Pie Picache as Lynette
- BB Gandanghari (Note: Credited as Rustom Padilla; Narito ang Puso Ko was released before Gandanghari came out as transgender.) as Joey
- Alfred Manal as Carlo Chavez
- Paolo Contis as Dondon Sanchez
- Rez Cortez
- Jon Achaval as Congressman Sanchez

== Television release ==
The film received a television premiere on December 9, 1993, as a feature presentation for GMA Network's movie block, Viva Sinerama.
