= Frame Up: Ihahatid Kita sa Hukay =

1997 action film by Pepe Marcos

- Directed by: Pepe Marcos
- Screenplay by: Henry Nadong
- Produced by: Orly Ilacad
- Starring: Raymart Santiago; Jessa Zaragoza
- Cinematography: Danny Bustos
- Edited by: Pepe Marcos
- Music by: Edwin "Kiko" Ortega
- Production companies: OctoArts Films; Cinemax Studios
- Distributed by: OctoArts Films
- Release date: October 1, 1997
- Running time: 100 minutes
- Country: Philippines
- Language: Filipino

Frame Up: Ihahatid Kita sa Hukay (lit. 'I will lead you to your grave') is a 1997 Filipino action film edited and directed by Pepe Marcos. The film stars Raymart Santiago and Jessa Zaragoza.

A co-production of OctoArts Films and Cinemax Studios, the film was theatrically released on October 1, 1997.

== Synopsis ==
After saving his life from bank robbers, Don Benito (Romeo) hired Roden (Raymart) to be his personal driver. Days later, Benito was killed by his business associates led by Dennis (Efren), who framed up Roden for the crime. Determined to clear his name, Roden sought vindication with the help of Don Benito's daughter Dianne (Jessa).

== Cast ==
- Raymart Santiago as Roden Sarmiento
- Jessa Zaragoza as Diane Pareno
- Efren Reyes Jr. as Dennis
- Ricardo Cepeda as Brian San Diego
- Levi Ignacio as Edison
- Manjo del Mundo as Antonio
- Celina Cortez as Tina
- Zandro Zamora as Maj. Valdemor
- Romeo Rivera as Don Benito Pareno
- Philip Supnet as Caloy
- Patrick Guzman as David
- Bianca Lapus as Maria
- Ernie Zarate as Gen. Robles
