= Anna Marie Gutierrez =

Filipino actress

- Born: 1964 (age 61–62)
- Occupation: Actress
- Years active: 1980–1987
- Children: 1

Anna Marie Gutierrez is a former Filipino actress.

== Career ==
Gutierrez was a fashion model before entering the show industry. In 1979, she was recruited as one of the cast in the movie Dolphy's Angels. However, she achieved full stardom when she starred in Peque Gallaga's erotic movie Scorpio Nights (1985) with Orestes Ojeda and Daniel Fernando.

She was nominated and won Best Actress for Gawad Urian Award in the film Takaw Tukso (1986) and in PMPC Star Awards for Movies in Unfaithful Wife (1986) and Hubad na Pangarap (1987).

After her last movie in 1987, she migrated to New York and started her career in the medical field. She is currently living in Larchmont, New York with her American husband and their daughter.

== Filmography ==
Year	Title
1980	Dolphy's Angels
1980	John & Marsha '80
1980	The Quick Brown Fox
1980	Tembong
1981	For Y'ur Height Only
1981	Stariray
1981	Mr. One-Two-Three Part 2
1982	Kumander Kris
1982	Mr. Wong Meets Jesse & James
1982	Batang Ilocos Sur
1982	Bin Mei
1982	Dancing Master 2
1982	Hinahamon Kita
1982	Tokwa't Baboy
1983	Dragon's Quest
1983	The Fighting Mayor
1983	Kilabot sa Bilis at Tapang
1983	W Is War
1983	Atsay Killer
1983	Pedro Tunasan
1983	Kickouts
1983	Over My Dead Body
1984	Pepeng Karbin
1984	Sendong Sungkit
1984	Harot
1984	Bedtime Story
1984	Take Home Girls
1984	Dagta
1985	Mga Babaeng Rehas
1985	Scorpio Nights
1985	Manoy, Hindi Ka Na Makakaisa
1985	Climax
1986	Unfaithful Wife
1986	Magkayakap sa Magdamag
1986	Takaw Tukso
1986	Huwag Pamarisan: Kulasisi
1986	Di Maghilom ang Sugat
1986	Bawal: Malaswa
1986	Gabi Na, Kumander
1987	Pakwela
1987	Hubad Na Pangarap
1987	Pakawala
