= Pahiram ng Sandali =

Philippine television drama series

- Title card
- Also known as: Chasing Moments
- Genre: Drama
- Created by: Aloy Adlawan
- Written by: Ana Nadela; Glaiza Ramirez
- Directed by: Maryo J. de los Reyes
- Creative director: Jun Lana
- Starring: Dingdong Dantes; Lorna Tolentino
- Theme music composer: Ogie Alcasid
- Opening theme: "Mga Nakaw na Sandali" by Jaya and Jay R
- Country of origin: Philippines
- Original language: Tagalog
- No. of episodes: 80

Production
- Executive producer: Nieva M. Sabit
- Producer: GMA Network
- Production locations: Manila, Philippines; Calatagan, Batangas, Philippines
- Cinematography: Jun Gonzales
- Camera setup: Multiple-camera setup
- Running time: 30–45 minutes
- Production company: GMA Entertainment TV

Original release
- Network: GMA Network
- Release: November 26, 2012 – March 15, 2013

Pahiram ng Sandali (transl. borrow a moment / international title: Chasing Moments) is a Philippine television drama series broadcast by GMA Network. Directed by Maryo J. de los Reyes, it stars Dingdong Dantes and Lorna Tolentino. It premiered on November 26, 2012 on the network's Telebabad line up. The series concluded on March 15, 2013, with a total of 80 episodes.

== Cast and characters ==
Cast

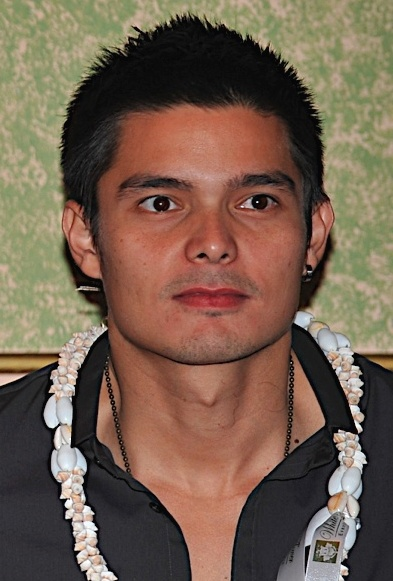
Dingdong Dantes

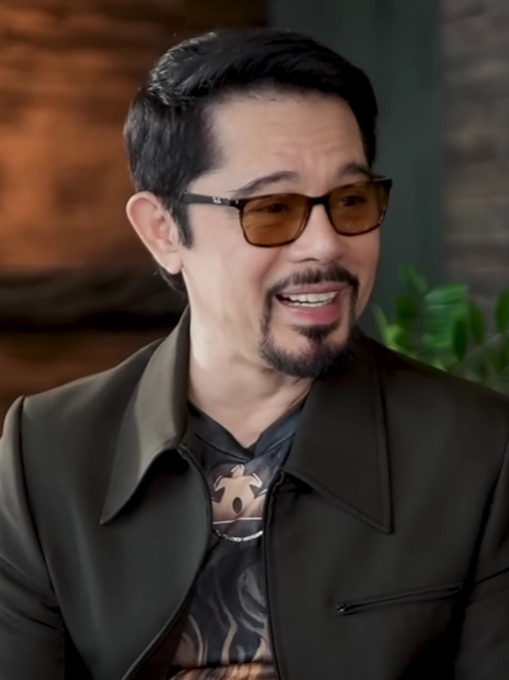
Christopher de Leon

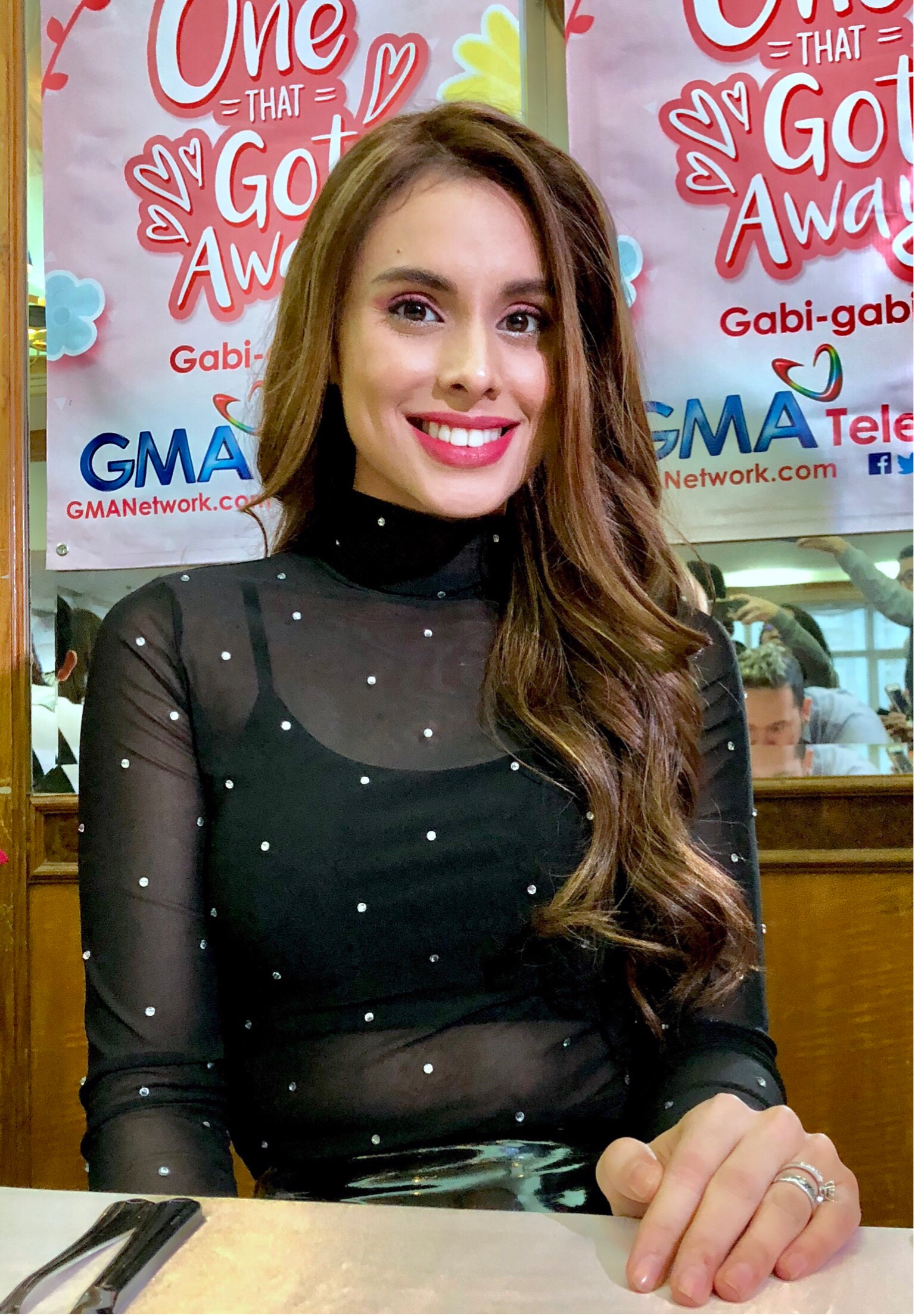
Max Collins

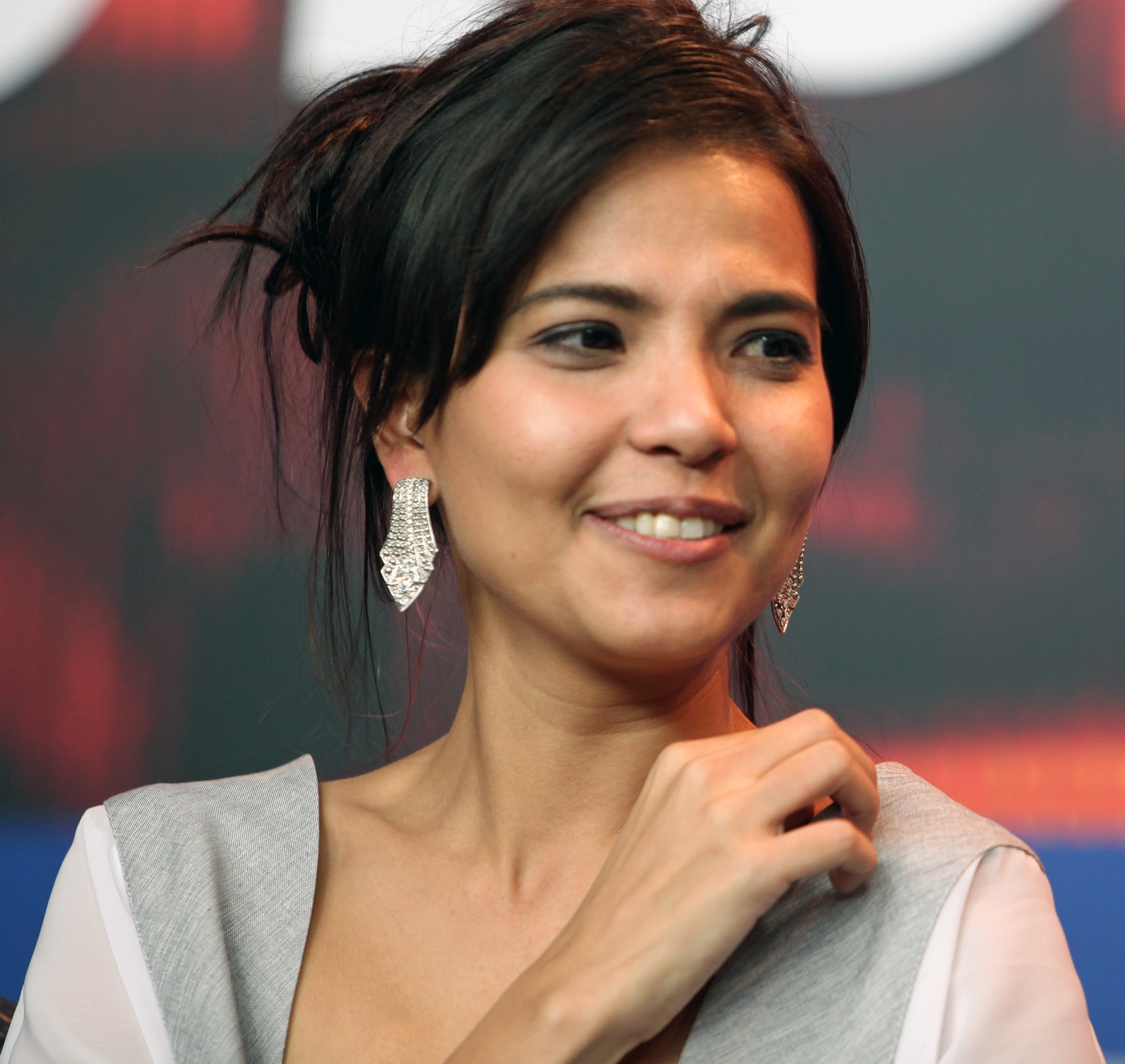
Alessandra De Rossi

=== Lead cast ===
- Lorna Tolentino as Janice Alvaro-Reyes

A media executive and the editor-in-chief of "Pinoy Reporter"—one of the popular tabloids in the country. She is hurt by her husband's lack of interest and is flattered by a young man's sincere interest and affection.

- Dingdong Dantes as Alex Santiago

A photo journalist in Pinoy Reporter, a tabloid owns and runs by his biological father, Larry Gomez. Alex is man driven by his desire to care for his mother and to prove his worth to his father. He falls in love with Janice Alvaro, an older woman, whose love realigns his goals in life.

=== Supporting cast ===
- Christopher de Leon as Philip Reyes

Janice's husband; a famous lawyer [though he owed everything he has to his wife]. His ego drives him to commits the greatest mistakes of his life and indulges an illicit affair with a much younger woman, Baby Umali, which gains the wrath of his only daughter, Cindy.

- Max Collins as Cindy Reyes

The only daughter of Philip and Janice Reyes. Cindy is an independent and adventurous woman who falls for Alex Santiago and later finds herself entangled in a love triangle with her mom.

- Alessandra De Rossi as Baby Umali

A cunning and ambitious lady, moonlighting as a lounge singer in a hotel. Here she meets Philip Reyes, which she finds as a "good catch". She became his mistress and vows to do everything to keep him in her life.

- Mark Gil as Larry Gomez

Gomez runs "The Philippine Examiner", considered as the most respected and influential news paper in the country and the sister-newspaper of "Pinoy Reporter". He is Alex Santiago's biological father who abandoned him several years ago.

- Sandy Andolong as Thea Santiago

Alex and Franz's loving and protective mother. She spends her life as a destitute mother whose only dream is to raise her children the best way she can.

- Kristoffer Martin as Franz dela Cruz
- Isabel Rivas as Diana Gomez

The spouse of Larry and mother to Andrew. She is also the woman who was instrumental in catapulting Larry to his present stature [her family owned a huge publishing house which is now runs by Larry]. Diana loves her husband to a passion and would go to any length just to keep him.

- Neil Ryan Sese as Andrew Gomez

The only son and heir of Larry and Diana Gomez. As arrogant as his father, Andrew grew happy-go-lucky and enjoys his family's wealth without the responsibilities. He falls in love with his childhood sweetheart, Cindy and will be entangled in a love triangle with his half-brother, Alex Santiago.

- Roy Alvarez as Romer Alcaraz

A veteran hard news reporter and columnist of the tabloid, "Pinoy Reporter". He meets Alex Santiago and become his protégé. A man of full of values, he teaches Alex to "value and appreciate every single moment because everything is just borrowed".

- Luz Valdez as Trining Alvaro

Janice Alvaro's doting spinster aunt-personal assistant-best friend-confidante-conscience and defender rolled into one.

- Julio Diaz as Berting dela Cruz

Thea Santiago's live in partner and father of Franz. An unprincipled man who loves to drink and gamble rather than to work for his family.

=== Guest cast ===
- Caridad Sanchez as Salve Umali
- Neri Naig as Regina
- Marissa Sanchez as Sonia
- Diva Montelaba as Benita "Kimberly" Labastida
- Tanya Gomez as Glenda
- Mark Marasigan as Perry
- Joshua Aragon as Jake Labastida
- Mike Jovida as Henry

== Development ==
After the sudden cancellation of Haram (transl. Forbidden) which was shelved due to controversies and sensitivity issues involving Islamic faith, GMA Network management decide to come up for a new project making use of the same cast. Series' creator Suzette Doctolero with creative head, Jake Tordesillas and Entertainment TV head, Lilybeth G. Rasonable began conceptualizing the series under the title "Hiram na Sandali" (transl. borrowed moment) in early October 2012. Doctolero decided to pitch the series about "May–December affair" to GMA Entertainment TV Group, since she thought it would be the best replacement for Haram. The network's Drama Department found the concept interesting, since it is "unusual" for a local drama serial to discuss that kind of concept. The title was later changed to Pahiram ng Sandali.

The producer hired Maryo J. de los Reyes to helm the series. Delos Reyes stated that the material has become more intriguing compared to the shelved Haram, since it’s now a love triangle story between a mother, a daughter, and the man who comes between them. "Directing stories about relationships is my comfort zone," Delos Reyes added. He has done many films with some of the senior stars of the cast except for Dantes who he works for the first time for this series.

== Production ==
Principal photography commenced on November 12, 2012 in Quezon City.

== Ratings ==
According to AGB Nielsen Philippines' Mega Manila household television ratings, the pilot episode of Pahiram ng Sandali earned a 23.7% rating. The final episode scored a 25.1% rating.

== Accolades ==
Accolades received by Pahiram ng Sandali
Year	Award	Category	Recipient	Result	Ref.
2013	US International Film and Video Festival	Best Telenovela	Pahiram ng Sandali	Won	
2013	27th PMPC Star Awards for Television	Best Primetime Drama Series	Pahiram ng Sandali	Nominated	
2013	18th Asian Television Awards	Best Actress in a Leading Role	Lorna Tolentino	Highly commended	
2014	Golden Screen TV Awards	Outstanding Original Drama Series	Pahiram ng Sandali	Nominated	
2014	Golden Screen TV Awards	Outstanding Performance by an Actor in a Drama Series	Dingdong Dantes	Nominated	
2014	Golden Screen TV Awards	Outstanding Supporting Actor in a Drama Series	Neil Ryan Sese	Nominated	
2014	Golden Screen TV Awards	Outstanding Performance by an Actress in a Drama Series	Lorna Tolentino	Nominated	
