= Nagbabagang Luha =

1988 Filipino film directed by Ishmael Bernal, starring Lorna Tolentino

- Official movie poster
- Directed by: Ishmael Bernal
- Screenplay by: Raquel Villavicencio
- Story by: Elena M. Patron
- Based on: Nagbabagang Luha by Elena M. Patron
- Produced by: Lily Y. Monteverde
- Starring: Lorna Tolentino; Gabby Concepcion; Richard Gomez; Alice Dixson
- Cinematography: Manolo Abaya; Eduardo Jacinto; Sergio Lobo
- Edited by: Augusto Salvador
- Music by: Willy Cruz
- Production company: Regal Films
- Distributed by: Regal Entertainment
- Release date: July 7, 1988
- Running time: 121 minutes
- Country: Philippines
- Languages: Filipino; English

Nagbabagang Luha (lit. 'Smoldering Tears') is a 1988 Filipino romantic drama film directed by Ishmael Bernal from a screenplay written by Raquel Villavicencio, adapted from the "komiks serial" of the same name written by Elena M. Patron and serialized under Superstar Komiks. It stars Lorna Tolentino, Gabby Concepcion, Richard Gomez, Alice Dixson, Gloria Romero, and Honey Mae Ledesma in her first and only cinematic role.

Produced and distributed by Regal Films, the film was theatrically released on July 7, 1988.

== Synopsis ==
A couple, Alex, a businessman, and Maita get a divorce after eight years of marriage as their marriage turns cold. They both love their only child Yeye, a daughter, greatly and fight for her custody. The custody is given to the mother, but Alex takes her with him to the United States. Maita asks her sister Cielo to pick up her daughter from Alex. The two sisters' plan fails when Alex confesses his true feelings for his sister-in-law and the two fall madly in love. Then Maita goes to get her daughter by herself. Circumstances become more complicated when Alex's mother interferes.

== Cast ==
- Lorna Tolentino as Maria Teresa "Maita" Zaragosa
- Gabby Concepcion as Alex Montaire
- Richard Gomez as Bien De Dios
- Alice Dixson as Cielo Zaragosa
- Gloria Romero as Imelda Montaire
- Honey Mae Ledesma as Teresa "Yeye" Montaire
- Olivia Cenizal as Mercedes "Cedes" L. Zaragosa

== Home media ==
Nagbabagang Luha was released on DVD by Regal Home Video in 2008, although it was miscredited to director Mel Chionglo.

== Reception ==
=== Critical response ===
Agustin Sotto, writing for Variety International Film Guide, considered the film "overwrought".

=== Accolades ===
The film won the awards for Best Supporting Actress (Gloria Romero) and Best Musical Score (Willy Cruz) at the 1989 FAMAS Awards.

== Remake ==
A television remake by GMA Network was broadcast in 2021, starring Glaiza de Castro, Rayver Cruz, Mike Tan, and Claire Castro.
