= Joey Gosiengfiao =

Filipino movie director (1941–2007)

- Born: Jose Gosiengfiao; March 15, 1941; Manila, Commonwealth of the Philippines
- Died: March 16, 2007 (aged 66); Quirino Memorial Medical Center, Quezon City, Philippines
- Burial place: Loyola Memorial Park, Marikina
- Occupations: Movie director; producer; writer
- Known for: Philippine camp films

Joey Gosiengfiao (March 15, 1941 – March 16, 2007) was a Filipino movie director, well known for the campy box-office hits he directed.

== Early life ==
He was born Jose Gosiengfiao on March 15, 1941, in Manila. He finished his studies at University of the East and also joined its UE Dramatic Guild.

== Career ==
Joey was best known for the sexy, campy box-office hits he directed for Regal Films in the 1970s and 1980s: Temptation Island, Underage, Bomba Star, Katorse, 14 Going Steady, among others. His films launched the likes of Dina Bonnevie, Maricel Soriano and Gretchen Barretto to full stardom and discovered established actors like Albert Martinez, Al Tantay, and Orestes Ojeda. In recent years, he had worked as publicist for Regal Films.

Some of his other works as a director were the Rape of Virginia P. (1989), Bomba Star (1980), and Nympha (1980).

Apart from his directorial success, Gosiengfiao is also known for his craft as a supervising producer for films like Pila Balde (1999), Pahiram Kahit Sandali (1998) and the more recent Forever My Love (2004).

== Personal life ==
Director Joey Gosiengfiao is the uncle of singer, pianist, actress & cosplayer Alodia Gosiengfiao.

== Death ==
He died on Friday, March 16, 2007 at 3:50 a.m., one day after suffering from his sixth heart attack on his 66th birthday Thursday, according to friends. He was rushed to Quirino Memorial Medical Center, Quezon City on Thursday due to heart attack, his 6th, but died a few hours later. He was cremated, according to Perez and Monteverde, at Loyola Memorial Park, in Marikina. A memorial service for the late director was also organized by his friends.

== Filmography ==
=== Director ===
Title	Year
My Funny Girl	1971
Takbo, Vilma, Dali!	1972
Lipad, Darna, Lipad!	1973
Zoom, Zoom, Superman!	1973
Sunugin Ang Samar	1974
La Paloma: Ang Kalapating Ligaw	1974
Lulubog Lilitaw sa Ilalim ng Tulay	1975
May Isang Tsuper ng Taxi	1975
Ang Boyfriend Kong Baduy	1976
Si Racquel At Si Rafael	1976
Piknik	1976
Hide and Seek	1976
Puwede Ako, Puwede Ka Pa Ba?	1976
Babae!	1977
Bawal: For Men Only	1977
Babae Ngayon at Kailanman	1977
Iwasan...Kabaret	1978
Bomba Star	1978
Huwag Hamakin! Hostess	1978
Promo Girl	1978
Iskandalo	1979
Kambal Sa Uma	1979
Bedspacers	1980
Nympha	1980
Candy	1980
Temptation Island	1980
Katorse	1980
Under-Age	1980
Blue Jeans	1981
Bata Pa Si Sabel	1981
Bakit Ba Ganyan?	1981
Where Love Has Gone	1982
Story of Three Loves	1982
First Kiss, First Love	1982
No Other Love	1982
Diary of Cristina Gaston	1982
Indecent Exposure	1983
Exploitation	1983
Tender Age	1984
14 Going Steady	1984
When I Fall In Love	1986
Virginia P.	1989
Secrets of Pura	1991
Ligaw-Ligawan, Kasal-Kasalan, Bahay-Bahayan	1993
Nights of Serafina	1996
Masarap, Masakit Ang Magmahal	1997

=== Producer ===
Title	Year
One Night, Three Women	1974
Secrets of Pura	1991
Shake, Rattle & Roll III	1991
True Confessions (Evelyn, Myrna, & Margie)	1992
Dobol Dribol	1992
Aswang	1992
First Time... Like a Virgin!	1992
Nakawin Mo Ang Aking Puso	1997
Manananggal in Manila	1997
Shake, Rattle & Roll 6	1997
Hatiin Natin Ang Ligaya	1998

=== Supervising Producer ===
Title	Year
Kaskasero	1974
Pretty Boy Hoodlum	1991
Adventures of Gary Leon at Kuting	1991
The Good, the Bad, & the Ugly	1992
Shotgun Banjo	1992
Pido Dida 3: May kambal Na!	1992
Pempe ni Sara at Pen	1992
Bakit Ako Mahihiya?	1992
Shake, Rattle & Roll IV	1992
Mga Syanong Parak	1993
Hulihin: Probinsiyanong Mandurukot	1993
Geron Olivar	1993
Galvez: Hanggang sa Dulo ng Mundo Hahanapin Kita!	1993
Sobra Talaga, Over!	1994
Nag-Iisang Bituin	1994
Multo In The City	1994
Greggy en' Boogie: Sakyan Mo Na Lang, Anna	1994
Bala at Lipstick	1994
Ang Ika-Labing Isang Utos: Mahalin Mo, Asawa Mo	1994
The Faitma Buen Story	1994
Ging-Gang-Goody-Giyiyap: I Love You Daddy!	1994
Shake, Rattle & Roll V	1994
Sa Ngalan ng Pag-Ibig	1995
Costales	1995
Moises Arcanghel: Sa Guhit ng Bala	1996
Daddy's Angels	1996
Batang Z	1996
Paano Kung Wala Ka Na?	1997
Nakaw na Sandali	1997
Mama Dito Sa Aking Puso	1997
Ang Pinakamahabang Baba sa Balat ng Lupa	1997
Nanggigigil Ako Sa Iyong Kagandahan	1998
Magagandang Hayop	1998
Init ng Laman	1998
Woman on a Tin Roof	1998
Serafin Geronimo: Kriminal ng Barrio Concepcion	1998
Pahiram Kahit Sandali	1998
Sana Pag-Ibig Na	1998
Sisa	1999
Kamay ni Eva	1999
Ibibigay Ko Ang Lahat	1999
Pila Balde (Fetch of Pail of Water)	1999
Seventeen	1999
Sa Paraiso ni Efren	1999
Hubad Sa Ilalim ng Buwan	1999
Dugo ng Birhen: El Kapitan	1999
Pedrong Palad	2000
Demons	2000
Halik ng Sirena	2001
Cood Dudes 24/7	2001
Xerex	2003
Forever My Love	2004

=== Executive producer ===
Title	Year
May Isang Tsuper na Taxi	1975
Paano na? Sa Mundo ni Janet	1994

=== Story ===
Title	Year
My Funny Girl	1971
Zoom, Zoom, Superman!	1973

=== Screenplay ===
Title	Year
My Funny Girl	1971
Takbo, Vilma, Dali!	1972
Zoom, Zoom, Superman!	1973
One Night, Three Women	1974
May Isang Tsuper na Taxi	1975

=== Writer ===
Title	Year
Zoom, Zoom, Superman!	1973
