= Ishmael Bernal =

Filipino director and filmmaker (1938–1996)

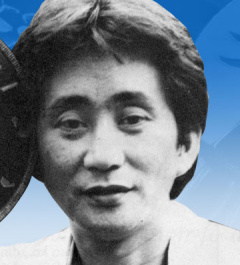
- Ishmael Bernal from the Order of National Artists (NCCA)
- Born: Ishmael Bernal; September 30, 1938; Manila, Philippine Commonwealth
- Died: June 2, 1996 (aged 57); Quezon City, Philippines
- Resting place: Libingan ng mga Bayani
- Occupation: Film director
- Years active: 1970–1994
- Awards: Order of National Artists of the Philippines

Ishmael Bernal (September 30, 1938 – June 2, 1996) was a Filipino film director and writer. He is considered as one of the most important filmmakers in the history of Philippine cinema. Bernal’s films, which include Nunal sa Tubig (1976), Ikaw Ay Akin (1978), Manila by Night (1980), Himala (1982), and Working Girls (1984), tackle feminist and social themes in a variety of genres. He was posthumously declared a National Artist of the Philippines in 2001.

== Early life and education ==
Bernal was born on September 30, 1938 in Manila. He was the only child of Elena Bernal. Ishmael grew up in the Santa Mesa district with his extended family, which included writer Lope K. Santos, his maternal grandfather.

Bernal received his bachelor’s degree in English from University of the Philippines Diliman, where he became a friend of future Communist Party of the Philippines (CPP) founder Jose Maria Sison. He also studied French literature at Aix-en-Provence in France. Bernal briefly owned a discotheque in Malate, Manila called When It’s a Grey November in Your Soul, before studying film at the Film Institute of Poona in India as a Colombo Plan scholar.

== Film career ==
Upon returning to the Philippines, Bernal reviewed films for the Manila Chronicle. He was approached by actor Eddie Rodriguez about making his first feature film for his Virgo production company. Bernal came up with the satirical comedy Ah Ewan, Basta sa Maynila Pa Rin Ako! (1970), but he left due to creative differences with Rodriguez, who ended up finishing it. Instead, Bernal made his directorial debut with Pagdating sa Dulo (1971), starring Rita Gomez, Vic Vargas, and Eddie Garcia. While it was a commercial failure, it later became a cult classic.

Under his name is a broad range of film genres and themes: historical dramas like El Vibora (The Viper), and the "Bonifacio" episode in the unreleased Lahing Pilipino (The Filipino Race); comedies like Tisoy (Mestizo), Pabling (Playboy), Working Girls and Working Girls II; experimental films like Nunal sa Tubig (Speck in the Water) and Himala (Miracle); and contemporary dramas exploring human psyches and social relationships, such as Ligaw Na Bulaklak (Wildflower), Mister Mo, Lover Boy Ko (Your Husband, My Lover), Ikaw Ay Akin (You Are Mine), Relasyon (The Affair), Aliw (Pleasure) and the film Manila by Night (or City After Dark). His filmography centers around the themes and problems that inevitably encrust the "social" as the core of personal malaise.

Bernal considered himself a feminist director and admitted that it was part of his interest to tackle issues affecting women; in addition, he was part of the underground gay scene during the Martial Law era. Although some elements include themes about the LGBTQ community and their lives, a significant part of his work is stories about and for women, such as the films Relasyon, Hinugot sa Langit, and Working Girls. Before Bernal's death, he was scheduled to direct a film about the life story of "Lola Rosa" Henson, a comfort woman during the Japanese invasion of the Philippines.

=== Television ===
Aside from film, Bernal also directed television shows like the long-time drama series Ang Makulay Na Daigdig ni Nora (The Colorful World of Nora) with Nora Aunor, for which he was named Outstanding Director in a Drama Series by the Patas Awards in 1979; Metro Magazine, Isip Pinoy, Dear Teacher and episodes for PETABISYON and Lorna. As an actor, he played lead roles in stage plays like Kamatayan sa Isang Anyo ng Rosas (Death in the Form of a Rose) in 1991 and Bacchae in 1992.

== Activism ==
Bernal had been an activist since university, when he was a member of the Student Cultural Association of the University of the Philippines. After graduation, he became involved in Kabataang Makabayan. He protested film censorship and was part of the Free the Artist Movement and the Concerned Artists of the Philippines.

His films, including those he directed during the dictatorship of Ferdinand Marcos, were also known for bearing feminist and social realist themes.

== Achievements ==
He won the Gawad Urian Award for Best Director four times for Dalawang Pugad, Isang Ibon (Two Nests, One Bird), 1977; Broken Marriage, 1983; Hinugot sa Langit (Wrenched From Heaven), 1985; and Pahiram ng Isang Umaga (Lend Me One Morning), 1989; and the best screenplay for City After Dark, 1980.

His film Pagdating sa Dulo won him the FAMAS Award for Best Screenplay, while Himala (Miracle) garnered nine major awards in the 1982 Metro Manila Film Festival. In that same year, Bernal was chosen by the Manunuri ng Pelikulang Pilipino as the Most Outstanding Filmmaker of the Decade 1971–1980. Among the 10 best films chosen by the critics, five were his. These include Pagdating sa Dulo, Nunal sa Tubig, Manila by Night, Himala and Hinugot sa Langit. He was also hailed as Director of the Decade by the Catholic Mass Media Awards (CMMA).

Bernal also won the CMMA Best Director Award (1983), the Bronze Hugo Award in the Chicago International Film Festival (1983) for the movie Himala. The Cultural Center of the Philippines presented him the Gawad CCP Para sa Sining for film in 1990. In 1993, he received the ASEAN Cultural Award in Communication Arts in Brunei Darrussalam.

His Nunal sa Tubig (A Speck in the Water), Aliw (Pleasure) and Relasyon (The Affair) was among the 25 Filipino films shown in New York from July 31 to August 1999, organized by the Film Society of Lincoln Center, in partnership with the Philippine Centennial Commission, the Cultural Center of the Philippines, IFFCOM, the Philippine Information Agency, the Consulate General of the Philippines in New York and the Philippine Centennial Coordinating Council - Northeast USA. This series of Filipino films were presented at the Walter Reade Theater of the Lincoln Center, in celebration of the 100th year of Philippine Independence.

== Death ==
Bernal's tomb at Libingan ng mga Bayani

He died on June 2, 1996, in Quezon City, Philippines of a heart attack. Bernal was buried at Himlayang Pilipino in Quezon City but was reinterred at the Libingan ng mga Bayani on September 14, 2024, after a state funeral.

== Filmography ==
=== As director and writer ===
Year	English title	Original title	Director	Writer	Notes
1971		Ah, Ewan! Basta sa Maynila Pa Rin Ako!	No	Yes	Directed by Eddie Rodriguez
1971	Vibora	-	Yes	No	First film; rereleased in 1972 as El Vibora
1971	At the Top	Pagdating sa Dulo	Yes	Yes	
1971		Daluyong!	Yes	No	
1972	Inspiration	-	Yes	No	
1972	Till Death Do Us Part	-	Yes	No	
1973	Now and Forever	-	Yes	No	
1973	Zoom, Zoom, Superman!	-	Yes	No	Superman parody anthology film with Elwood Perez and Joey Gosiengfiao
1973		Si Popeye, Atbp	Yes	No	Popeye parody anthology film with Elwood Perez and Joey Gosiengfiao; segment: "Popeye"
1974		Huwag Tularan: Pito ang Asawa Ko	Yes	Yes	
1975		Mister Mo, Lover Boy Ko	Yes	No	
1975	Sleeping Dragon	Xing long fu hu	Yes	No	Co-directed with Jimmy L. Pascual
1975		Lumapit, Lumayo ang Umaga	Yes	Yes	
1976		Ligaw Na Bulaklak	Yes	No	
1976	A Speck in the Water	Nunal sa Tubig	Yes	No	
1976		Anna Karenina: Babaing Hiwalay sa Asawa	Yes	No	
1976	Scotch on the Rocks to Remember, Black Coffee to Forget	-	Yes	No	Unreleased film
1977		Lahing Pilipino	Yes	No	Unreleased film Segment "Bonifacio"
1977		Tisoy!	Yes	No	
1977		Dalawang Pugad... Isang Ibon	Yes	Yes	
1977		Walang Katapusang Tag-araw	Yes	Yes	
1978		Isang Gabi sa Iyo... Isang Gabi sa Akin	Yes	No	
1978	You Are Mine	Ikaw Ay Akin	Yes	Yes	
1979		Boy Kodyak	Yes	No	
1979		Menor de Edad	Yes	No	
1979		Bakit May Pag-ibig Pa?	Yes	No	Anthology film with Celso Ad. Castillo
1979		Salawahan	Yes	No	
1979		Aliw	Yes	Yes	
1980	Good Morning Sunshine	-	Yes	No	
1980	Girlfriend	-	Yes	Yes	
1980	Manila by Night	City After Dark	Yes	Yes	
1981		Bihagin: Bilibid Boys	Yes	No	
1981		Pabling	Yes	No	
1982		Galawgaw	Yes	Yes	
1982		Ito Ba ang Ating Mga Anak	Yes	Yes	
1982		Relasyon	Yes	Yes	
1982		Hindi Kita Malimot	Yes	No	
1982	Miracle	Himala	Yes	No	
1983	Broken Marriage		Yes	No	
1983		Sugat sa Ugat	Yes	No	
1984	Working Girls	-	Yes	No	
1984	Shake, Rattle & Roll	-	Yes	No	Horror anthology film with Emmanuel H. Borlaza and Peque Gallaga; segment: "Pridyider" ("Fridge")
1985		Gamitin Mo Ako	Yes	No	
1985		Hinugot sa Langit	Yes	No	
1986	The Graduates	-	Yes	No	
1987	Working Girls 2	-	Yes	No	
1987		Pinulot Ka Lang sa Lupa	Yes	No	Remade in 2017 as a TV series by GMA Network
1988		Nagbabagang Luha	Yes	No	Remade in 2021 as a TV series by GMA Network
1989		Pahiram ng Isang Umaga	Yes	No	
1992		Mahal Kita, Walang Iba	Yes	Yes	
1994		Wating	Yes	No	

== Television ==
=== As director ===
Year	Title	Notes
1979	Ang Makulay Na Daigdig ni Nora	
1987	Isip Pinoy	Episode: "Ang Maralitang Tagalunsod"

=== As actor ===
Year	Title	Role	Notes
1993	Noli Me Tangere	Kap. Valentin	

== Accolades ==
Year	Group	Category	Work	Result
1983	Berlin International Film Festival	Golden Bear	Himala	Nominated
1983	Chicago International Film Festival	Bronze Hugo	Himala	Won
1990	FAMAS Award	Best Director	Pahiram ng Isang Umaga	Nominated
1989	FAMAS Award	Best Director	Nagbabagang Luha	Nominated
1988	FAMAS Award	Best Director	Pinulot Ka Lang sa Lupa	Nominated
1985	FAMAS Award	Best Director	Working Girls	Nominated
1984	FAMAS Award	Best Director	Broken Marriage	Nominated
1983	FAMAS Award	Best Director	Himala	Nominated
1979	FAMAS Award	Best Director	Isang Gabi sa Iyo... Isang Gabi sa Akin	Nominated
1976	FAMAS Award	Best Director	Lumapit, Lumayo ang Umaga	Nominated
1972	FAMAS Award	Best Screenplay	Pagdating sa Dulo	Won
1972	FAMAS Award	Best Director	Pagdating sa Dulo	Nominated
1995	Gawad Urian Award	Best Direction (Pinakamahusay na Direksyon)	Wating	Nominated
1993	Gawad Urian Award	Best Direction (Pinakamahusay na Direksyon)	Mahal Kita Walang Iba	Nominated
1990	Gawad Urian Award	Best Direction (Pinakamahusay na Direksyon)	Pahiram ng Isang Umaga	Won
1986	Gawad Urian Award	Best Direction (Pinakamahusay na Direksyon)	Hinugot sa Langit	Won
1984	Gawad Urian Award	Best Direction (Pinakamahusay na Direksyon)	Broken Marriage	Won
1983	Gawad Urian Award	Best Direction (Pinakamahusay na Direksyon)	Himala	Nominated
1983	Gawad Urian Award	Best Direction (Pinakamahusay na Direksyon)	Relasyon	Nominated
1983	Gawad Urian Award	Best Screenplay (Pinakamahusay na Dulang Pampelikula)	Relasyon	Nominated
1982	Gawad Urian Award	Best Direction (Pinakamahusay na Direksyon)	Pabling	Nominated
1981	Gawad Urian Award	Best Screenplay (Pinakamahusay na Dulang Pampelikula)	City After Dark	Won
1981	Gawad Urian Award	Best Film of the Decade (Natatanging Pelikula ng Dekada)	Nunal sa Tubig 1970–1979	Won
1981	Gawad Urian Award	Best Film of the Decade (Natatanging Pelikula ng Dekada)	Pagdating sa Dulo 1970–1979	Won
1981	Gawad Urian Award	Best Direction (Pinakamahusay na Direksyon)	City After Dark	Nominated
1979	Gawad Urian Award	Best Direction (Pinakamahusay na Direksyon)	Aliw	Nominated
1978	Gawad Urian Award	Best Direction (Pinakamahusay na Direksyon)	Dalawang Pugad... Isang Ibon	Won
1978	Gawad Urian Award	Best Screenplay (Pinakamahusay na Dulang Pampelikula)	Dalawang Pugad... Isang Ibon	Nominated
1977	Gawad Urian Award	Best Direction (Pinakamahusay na Direksyon)	Nunal sa Tubig	Nominated
1982	Metro Manila Film Festival	Best Director	Himala	Won
1990	Star Awards for Movies	Movie Director of the Year	Pahiram ng Isang Umaga	Won
1995	Young Critics Circle, Philippines	Best Film	Wating	Won

=== See also ===
1. Brocka-Bernal: Alaala ng mga Artista ng Bayan, December 1996
