= List of action films of the 1990s =

This is chronological list of action films released in the 1990s. Often there may be considerable overlap particularly between action and other genres (including horror, comedy and science fiction films); the list should attempt to document films which are more closely related to action, even if they blend genres.

Title	Director	Cast	Country	Subgenre/notes
1990
Abraxas, Guardian of the Universe	Damian Lee	Jesse Ventura, Sven-Ole Thorsen, Damian Lee	United States	Science fiction action
"Ako ang Batas" -Gen. Tomas Karingal	Francis "Jun" Posadas	Eddie Garcia, John Regala, Cesar Montano, Marita Zobel, Jobelle Salvador, Michael Locsin, Jovit Moya, Subas Herrero	Philippines	Biographical action
Air America	Roger Spottiswoode	Mel Gibson, Robert Downey Jr., Nancy Travis	United States	
All for the Winner	Corey Yuen, Jeffrey Lau	Stephen Chow, Ng Man Tat	Hong Kong	
Alyas Pogi: Birador ng Nueva Ecija	Joey del Rosario	Ramon "Bong" Revilla Jr., Janice De Belen, Edu Manzano, Johnny Delgado, Tommy Abuel	Philippines	Biographical action
American Ninja 4: The Annihilation	Cedric Sundstrom	Michael Dudikoff, David Bradley, James Booth	United States	
Another 48 Hrs.	Walter Hill	Eddie Murphy, Nick Nolte, Brion James	United States	
Apo: Kingpin ng Maynila	Marlon Bautista	Ramon Revilla, Ramon "Bong" Revilla, Jr., Lani Mercado	Philippines	Action thriller
Bad Boy	Eddie Rodriguez	Robin Padilla, Cristina Gonzales, Mark Gil, Ronaldo Valdez, Kate Gomez	Philippines	
Bala at Rosaryo	Pepe Marcos	Ramon "Bong" Revilla, Jr., Eddie Garcia, Efren Reyes, Jr.	Philippines	Action thriller
Barumbado	Willie Milan	Robin Padilla, Monica Herrera, Lani Lobangco, Pinky de Leon, Michael de Mesa, Romeo Rivera	Philippines	
Bird on a Wire	John Badham	Mel Gibson, Goldie Hawn, David Carradine	United States	
Bloodfist II	Andy Blumenthal	Don "The Dragon" Wilson, Rina Reyes, Jose Mari Avellana	United States	
Blue Steel	Kathryn Bigelow	Jamie Lee Curtis, Ron Silver, Clancy Brown	United States	
Bullet in the Head	John Woo	Tony Leung, Jacky Cheung	Hong Kong	
Captain America	Albert Pyun	Matt Salinger	United States; Yugoslavia	
Curry and Pepper	Blackie Ko	Ann Bridgewater, Jacky Cheung, Stephen Chow	Hong Kong	
Darkman	Sam Raimi	Liam Neeson, Frances McDormand, Colin Friels	United States	Science fiction action
David Balondo ng Tondo	Jose Reyes Balagtas	Ramon Revilla Sr., Aurora Sevilla, Rina Reyes, Paquito Diaz, Ruel Vernal	Philippines	
Death Warrant	Deran Sarafian	Jean-Claude Van Damme, Robert Guillaume, Cynthia Gibb	Canada; United States	
Delta Force 2: The Colombian Connection	Aaron Norris	Chuck Norris, Billy Drago, John P. Ryan	United States	
Dick Tracy	Warren Beatty	Warren Beatty, Al Pacino, Madonna	United States	
Die Hard 2	Renny Harlin	Bruce Willis, Bonnie Bedelia, William Atherton	United States	
Durugin ng Bala si Peter Torres	Toto Natividad	Jess Lapid Jr., Melissa Mendez, Conrad Poe, Dick Israel, Rodolfo "Boy" Garcia	Philippines	Biographical action
Fatal Termination	Andrew Kam	Moon Lee, Robin Shou	Hong Kong	
La Femme Nikita	Luc Besson	Anne Parillaud, Jean-Hugues Anglade, Tcheky Karyo	France; Italy	Action thriller
Hard to Kill	Bruce Malmuth	Steven Seagal, Kelly Le Brock, Bill Sadler	United States	
Hindi Ka Na Sisikatan ng Araw (Kapag Puno Na Ang Salop 3)	Pablo Santiago	Fernando Poe Jr., Monica Herrera, Eddie Garcia, Romy Diaz, Janno Gibbs, Cathy Mora	Philippines	
The Hunt For Red October	John McTiernan	Sean Connery, Alec Baldwin, Joss Ackland	United States	Action thriller
I Come in Peace	Craig R. Baxley	Dolph Lundgren, Betsy Brantley, Brian Benben	United States	
Ikasa Mo, Ipuputok Ko!	Augusto Salvador	Phillip Salvador, Maila Gumila, Sheila Ysrael, Eddie Garcia, Michael de Mesa, Dindo Arroyo	Philippines	Action thriller
Iisa-isahin Ko Kayo!	Francis (Jun) Posadas	Ronnie Ricketts, Charlie Davao, Subas Herrero, John Regala, Maila Gumila	Philippines	
Island of Fire	Kevin Chu	Jackie Chan, Sammo Hung, Tony Leung Kar-Fai	Hong Kong	
Kaaway ng Batas	Pepe Marcos	Rudy Fernandez, Star Querubin, Zaldy Zshornack, Gabby Concepcion, Efren Reyes Jr., Edu Manzano	Philippines	Action thriller
Kahit Konting Pagtingin	Pablo Santiago	Fernando Poe Jr., Sharon Cuneta, Ricky Davao, Bing Loyzaga, Paquito Diaz	Philippines	Romantic action
Kahit Singko, Hindi Ko Babayaran ang Buhay Mo!	Jesus Jose	Lito Lapid, Tony Ferrer, Alma Moreno, Robert Arevalo, Raoul Aragonn	Philippines	
Kapitan Paile: Hindi Kita Iiwanang Buhay	Dante Pangilinan	Miguel Rodriguez, Bembol Roco, Lani Lobangco, Star Querubin, Melissa Mendez	Philippines	
Kasalanan ang Buhayin Ka	Francis "Jun" Posadas	Cesar Montano, Rita Avila, John Regala	Philippines	
Kunin Mo ang Ulo ni Ismael	Francis 'Jun' Posadas	Jestoni Alarcon, Joel Torre, Rita Avila, Ian Veneracion, John Regala	Philippines	
Lethal Panther	Godfrey Ho	Sibelle Hu, Maria Yuen, Yoko Miyamoto	Hong Kong	
Lionheart	Sheldon Lettich	Jean-Claude Van Damme	United States	
Little and Big Weapon	Tony Y. Reyes	Joey de Leon, Rene Requiestas, Tetchie Agbayani	Philippines	Action comedy
Maniac Cop 2	William Lustig	Robert Davi, Claudia Christian, Michael Lerner	United States	
Marked for Death	Dwight H. Little	Steven Seagal, Basil Wallace, Keith David	United States	
Martial Law	S.E. Cohen	Cynthia Rothrock, David Carradine, Richard Brandes	United States	
May Araw Ka Rin Bagallon!	Charlie Ordoñez	Dan Alvaro, Beverly Vergel, Tony Ferrer, Paquito Diaz, Rez Cortez, Shyr Valdez, Zandro Zamora, Manjo del Mundo, King Gutierrez, Joey Padilla, Bomber Moran	Philippines	Biographical action drama
Narrow Margin	Peter Hyams	Gene Hackman, Anne Archer, James B. Sikking	United States	Action thriller
Navy SEALS	Lewis Teague	Charlie Sheen, Michael Biehn, Joanne Whalley	United States	Action thriller
Peacemaker	Kevin S. Tenney	Robert Forster, Lance Edwards, Hilary Shepard	United States	
Predator 2	Stephen Hopkins	Danny Glover, Gary Busey, Ruben Blades	United States	Science fiction action
RoboCop 2	Irvin Kershner	Peter Weller, Nancy Allen, Dan O'Herlihy	United States	Science fiction action
Sa Diyos Lang Ako Susuko	Manuel Cinco	Robin Padilla, Roi Vinzon	Philippines	
Short Time	Gregg Champion	Dabney Coleman, Matt Frewer, Teri Garr	United States	
Teenage Mutant Ninja Turtles	Steven Barron	Judith Hoag, Elias Koteas, Ray Serra	United States	
Robot Jox	Stuart Gordon	Gary Graham, Anne-Marie Johnson, Paul Koslo	United States	Science fiction action
The Rookie	Clint Eastwood	Clint Eastwood, Charlie Sheen, Raúl Juliá	United States	
Sgt. Miguel Carpio: Multiple Murder	Jerry O. Tirazona	Jess Lapid Jr., Charlie Davao, Nick Romano, Dina Dominguez, Marithez Samson	Philippines	
The Swordsman	King Hu, Ching Siu-Tung, Ann Hui, Andrew Kam, Tsui Hark	Sam Hui, Jacky Cheung, Cecilia Yip, Sharla Cheung	Hong Kong	Martial arts film
Total Recall	Paul Verhoeven	Arnold Schwarzenegger, Rachel Ticotin, Sharon Stone	United States	
Walang Awa Kung Pumatay	Junn P. Cabreira	Robin Padilla, Rita Avila, Conrad Poe, Dick Israel, Zandro Zamora	Philippines	
White Hunter, Black Heart	Clint Eastwood	Clint Eastwood, Jeff Fahey, Alun Armstrong	United States	
1991
Anak ni Baby Ama	Deo J. Fajardo Jr.	Robin Padilla, Eddie Rodriguez, Bembol Roco, Amy Perez, Ilonah Jean	Philippines	
Armour of God II: Operation Condor	Jackie Chan	Jackie Chan, Carol Cheng, Eva Cobo	Hong Kong	
Backdraft	Ron Howard	Kurt Russell, William Baldwin, Robert De Niro	United States	Action thriller
Batas ng .45	Ronwaldo Reyes	Fernando Poe Jr., Timmy Cruz, Paquito Diaz, Charlie Davao, R.R. Herrera	Philippines	
Bingbong: The Vincent Crisologo Story	Romy V. Suzara	Rudy Fernandez, Charito Solis, Eddie Rodriguez, Kristine Garcia, Rez Cortes	Philippines	Biographical action
Black Cat	Stephen Shin	Simon Yam, Thomas Lam, Jade Leung	Hong Kong	
Boyong Mañalac: Hoodlum Terminator	Eddie Rodriguez	Eddie Garcia, Edu Manzano, Roi Vinzon, John Regala, Maita Soriano	Philippines	
Capt Jaylo (Batas sa Batas)	Pepe Marcos	Ramon "Bong" Revilla Jr., Monica Herrera, Rina Reyes, Maritoni Fernandez, Edu Manzano, Raoul Aragonn, Rez Cortez, Tom Olivar, George Estregan Jr., Manjo del Mundo, King Gutierrez, Edwin Reyes	Philippines	Biographical action
Contreras Gang	Pepe Marcos	Edu Manzano, Cristina Gonzales, Johnny Delgado, Monsour del Rosario, Rez Cortez	Philippines	
Dalawa Man ang Buhay Mo, Pagsasabayin Ko	Willy Milan	Ronnie Ricketts, Mark Gil, Rina Reyes, Roy Alvarez, Marissa Delgado	Philippines	
Darna	Joel Lamangan	Nanette Medved, Nida Blanca, Edu Manzano, Pilar Pilapil, Tonton Gutierrez	Philippines	Superhero
Do or Die	Andy Sidaris	Erik Estrada, Dona Speir, Roberta Vasquez	United States	
Double Impact	Sheldon Lettich	Jean-Claude Van Damme, Geoffrey Lewis, Alan Scarfe	United States	
Dune Warriors	Cirio Santiago	David Carradine, Rick Hill, Luke Askew, Jillian McWhirter, Blake Boyd, Dante Varona, Ma. Isabel Lopez	United States	
Fight Back to School	Gordon Chan	Stephen Chow, Sharla Cheung, Roy Cheung	Hong Kong	
Final Impact	Joseph Merhi	Lorenzo Lamas, Kathleen Kinmont, Gary Daniels	United States	Martial arts film
Fist of Fury 1991	Joh Chung Sing	Stephen Chow, Kenny Bee, Cheung Man	Hong Kong	
F/X2	Richard Franklin	Bryan Brown, Brian Dennehy, Rachel Ticotin	United States	Action thriller
Ganti ng Api	Marlon Bautista	Ronnie Ricketts, Mariz, Monsour del Rosario, Eddie Rodriguez, Tirso Cruz III	Philippines	
God of Gamblers II	Wong Jing	Andy Lau, Stephen Chow, Ng Man Tat	Hong Kong	
The Hard Way	John Badham	Michael J. Fox, James Woods, Annabella Sciorra	United States	
Harley Davidson and the Marlboro Man	Simon Wincer	Mickey Rourke, Don Johnson, Chelsea Field	United States	
Hinukay Ko Na ang Libingan Mo	Manuel "Fyke" Cinco	Robin Padilla, Nanette Medved, Cherry Pie Picache, Eddie Garcia, Dencio Padilla	Philippines	
The Hitman	Aaron Norris	Chuck Norris, Michael Parks, Alberta Watson, Al Waxman	United States; Canada	
Hudson Hawk	Michael Lehmann	Bruce Willis, Danny Aiello, Andie MacDowell	United States	
The Human Shield	Ted Post	Michael Dudikoff	United States	
If Looks Could Kill	William Dear	Richard Grieco, Gabrielle Anwar, Linda Hunt, Roger Rees	United States; Canada	Action comedy
Isang Milyon Sa Ulo ni Cobra	Bert Mendoza	Tony Ferrer, Jess Lapid Jr., George Estregan Jr., Baldo Marro, Cristina Crisol, Beverly Vergel, Vic Vargas	Philippines	
Kidlat ng Maynila: Joe Pring 2	Augusto Salvador	Phillip Salvador, Aurora Sevilla, Edu Manzano , Maritoni Fernandez, Monsour del Rosario, Bembol Roco	Philippines	
Kung Patatawarin Ka ng Bala Ko!	Ricardo 'Bebong' Osorio	Edu Manzano, Maila Gumila, Maita Soriano, Paquito Diaz, Lito Legaspi	Philippines	
The Last Boy Scout	Tony Scott	Bruce Willis, Damon Wayans	United States	
Lintik Lang ang Walang Ganti!	Francis "Jun" Posadas	John Regala, Raul Zaragoza, Jojo Alejar, Patrick de la Rosa, Roselle Agana	Philippines	
Mabuting Kaibigan, Masamang Kaaway	Augusto Salvador	Fernando Poe Jr., Vic Vargas, Marianne dela Riva, Imelda Ilanan, Dencio Padilla	Philippines	
Maging Sino Ka Man	Eddie Rodriguez	Sharon Cuneta, Robin Padilla, Edu Manzano, Vina Morales, Rosemarie Gil	Philippines	Action romantic comedy
Manong Gang	Marlon Bautista	Ramon "Bong" Revilla Jr., Dina Bonnevie, Paquito Diaz, Max Alvarado, Berting Labra, Bert Olivar, Goliath, Dennis Roldan, Dick Israel, King Gutierrez, Edwin Reyes, Manjo del Mundo, Baldo Marro	Philippines	
Markang Bungo: The Bobby Ortega Story	Nilo Saez	Rudy Fernandez, Donita Rose, Michael de Mesa, Dennis Roldan, Rez Cortez, Joey Padilla, Maritoni Fernandez, Lito Legaspi	Philippines	Biographical action
Martial Law 2: Undercover	Kurt Anderson	Jeff Wincott, Billy Drago, Cynthia Rothrock	United States	
Mayor Latigo (Ang Barakong Alkalde ng Baras)	Jose N. Carreon	Eddie Garcia, Jess Lapid Jr., Marianne dela Riva, George Estregan Jr., Lani Lobangco	Philippines	Biographical action
McBain	James Glickenhaus	Christopher Walken, Michael Ironside, Steve James	United States	
Once Upon a Time in China	Tsui Hark	Jet Li, Yuen Biao, Jacky Cheung	Hong Kong	
Out for Justice	John Flynn	Steven Seagal, William Forsythe, Jerry Orbach	United States	
Para sa 'Yo ang Huling Bala Ko!	Toto Natividad	Richard Gomez, Louella de Cordova, Ruel Vernal, Subas Herrero, Zandro Zamora	Philippines	
The Perfect Weapon	Mark DiSalle	Jeff Speakman, John Dye, Mako	United States	Martial arts film
Point Break	Kathryn Bigelow	Patrick Swayze, Keanu Reeves, Gary Busey	United States	
Ricochet	Russell Mulcahy	Denzel Washington, John Lithgow, Ice-T	United States	Action thriller
Riki-Oh: The Story of Ricky	Simon Nam	Fan Siu-Wong, Philip Kwok	Hong Kong; Japan	
Robin Hood: Prince of Thieves	Kevin Reynolds	Kevin Costner, Morgan Freeman, Christian Slater	United States	Action adventure
The Rocketeer	Joe Johnston	Billy Campbell, Jennifer Connelly, Alan Arkin	United States	
Run	Geoff Burrowes	Patrick Dempsey, Kelly Preston, Ken Pogue	United States	
Sagad Hanggang Buto	Bebong Osorio	Ace Vergel, Cristina Gonzales, Rachel Lobangco, Willie Revillame, Dencio Padilla, Dindo Arroyo, Zandro Zamora, Paquito Diaz, Efren Reyes, Edu Manzano	Philippines	
Samurai Cop	Amir Shervan	Robert Z'Dar, Mark Hannon, Mark Frazer	United States	Action thriller
Savior of the Soul	Corey Yuen	Andy Lau, Anita Mui, Kenny Bee	Hong Kong	
Sea Wolves	Siu-Keung Cheng	Cynthia Khan, Simon Yam, Gary Chow	Hong Kong	
Showdown in Little Tokyo	Mark L. Lester	Dolph Lundgren, Brandon Lee, Cary-Hiroyuki Tagawa	United States	
Stone Cold	Craig R. Baxley	Brian Bosworth, Lance Henriksen, William Forsythe	United States	
Swordsmen in Double Flag Town	He Ping	Wei Gao, Mana Zhao	China	
Takas sa Impierno	Bebong Osorio	Ricky Davao, Cristina Gonzales, Paquito Diaz, Michael de Mesa, Dennis Roldan	Philippines	
The Taking of Beverly Hills	Sidney J. Furie	Ken Wahl, Matt Frewer, Robert Davi	United States	
Teenage Mutant Ninja Turtles II: The Secret of the Ooze	Michael Pressman	Paige Turco, David Warner, Ernie Reyes Jr.	United States	
Terminator 2: Judgment Day	James Cameron	Arnold Schwarzenegger, Linda Hamilton, Edward Furlong	United States	Science fiction action
Tiger Claws	Kelly Makin	Jalal Merhi, Cynthia Rothrock	Canada	
Toy Soldiers	Daniel Petrie Jr.	Sean Astin, Wil Wheaton, Keith Coogan, Andrew Divoff	United States	
Trancers II	Charles Band	Tim Thomerson, Helen Hunt, Megan Ward	United States	Action thriller
Uubusin Ko ang Lahi Mo	Pepe Marcos	Phillip Salvador, Maricel Laxa, Robert Arevalo, Marita Zobel, Eddie Gutierrez	Philippines	Action drama
Valentin Zapanta, Alyas Ninong: Huling Kilabot ng Tondo	Jose N. Carreon	Eddie Garcia, Charo Santos, Johnny Delgado, Mark Gil, Rina Reyes	Philippines	
Zeram	Keita Amemiya		Japan	
1992
Aces: Iron Eagle III	John Glen	Louis Gossett Jr., Paul Freeman, Rachel McLish	United States	
Alyas Hunyango	Dante Pangilinan	Monsour del Rosario, Donita Rose, Lito Legaspi, Bernard Bonnin, Renato del Prado, Berting Labra	Philippines	Superhero action
Alyas Pogi 2	Toto Natividad	Ramon "Bong" Revilla Jr., Rita Avila, Charito Solis, Jay Ilagan, Michael de Mesa	Philippines	Biographical action
American Samurai	Sam Firstenberg	David Bradley, Mark Dacascos, John Fujioka	United States	Martial arts film
Andres Manambit: Angkan ng Matatapang	Ike Jarlego Jr.	Eddie Garcia, Pinky de Leon, Eddie Gutierrez, Subas Herrero, Kier Legaspi	Philippines	Biographical action
Angel Terminators	Wai Lit	Carrie Ng, Kara Wai, Dick Wei	Hong Kong	
Bad Boy 2	Ricardo 'Bebong' Osorio	Robin Padilla, Monique Wilson, Dennis Padilla, Vic Vargas, Jaime Garchitorena	Philippines	
Basagulero	Jett C. Espiritu	Ronnie Ricketts, Aurora Sevilla, Efren Reyes, Rachel Lobangco, Dennis Roldan	Philippines	
Batman Returns	Tim Burton	Michael Keaton, Danny DeVito, Michelle Pfeiffer	United States	
Black Cat 2	Stephen Shin	Jade Leung, Robin Shou, Zoltán Buday	Hong Kong	
Boboy Salonga: Batang Tondo	Junn P. Cabreira	Jeric Raval, Monica Herrera, Vic Vargas, Mark Gil, Rina Reyes	Philippines	
Boy Praning: Utak Pulbura	Francis "Jun" Posadas	Ian Veneracion, Monica Herrera, Mark Gil, Michael de Mesa, Roy Alvarez, Roi Vinzon, Lito Legaspi, John Estrada, Anjo Yllana, Gabriel Romulo	Philippines	Action thriller
Boy Recto	Jett C. Espiritu	Ronnie Ricketts, Aiko Melendez, Jess Lapid Jr., Bembol Roco, Michael de Mesa	Philippines	
Buffy the Vampire Slayer	Fran Rubel Kuzui	Kristy Swanson, Donald Sutherland, Rutger Hauer	United States	Action comedy
CIA Code Name: Alexa	Joseph Merhi	Lorenzo Lamas, Kathleen Kinmont, O. J. Simpson	United States	
Cordora: Lulutang Ka sa Sarili Mong Dugo	Francis "Jun" Posadas	Eddie Garcia, Daniel Fernando, Roi Vinzon, Roy Alvarez, Tessie Tomas	Philippines	
Deadly Dream Women	Taylor Wong Tai-loi	Cheung Man, Yan Chingmy	Hong Kong	
Dito sa Pitong Gatang	Pablo Santiago	Fernando Poe Jr., Nanette Medved, Harlene Bautista, Dencio Padilla, Max Alvarado	Philippines	Action comedy
El Mariachi	Robert Rodriguez	Carlos Gallardo, Consuelo Gomez, Reinol Martinez	United States	
Freejack	Geoff Murphy	Emilio Estevez, Mick Jagger, Anthony Hopkins	United States	
Full Contact	Ringo Lam	Chow Yun-fat, Ann Bridgewater, Frankie Chin	Hong Kong	
Hard Boiled	John Woo	Chow Yun-fat, Tony Leung Chiu-Wai, Anthony Wong	Hong Kong	
The Heroic Trio	Johnnie To	Maggie Cheung, Michelle Yeoh, Anita Mui	Hong Kong	Martial arts film
Jerry Marasigan, WPD	Augusto Salvador	Jestoni Alarcon, Gretchen Barretto, John Regala, Patrick dela Rosa, Tobi Alejar	Philippines	
Kahit Buhay Ko	Jose N. Carreon	Rudy Fernandez, Ruffa Gutierrez, Tirso Cruz III, Johnny Delgado, Michael de Mesa	Philippines	
King of Beggars	Gordon Chan	Stephen Chow	Hong Kong	Action comedy
Kuffs	Bruce A. Evans	Christian Slater, Tony Goldwyn, Milla Jovovich	United States	Action comedy
Lakay	Nilo Saez	Fernando Poe Jr., Charo Santos, Rina Reyes, Efren Reyes Jr., Jose Romulo, Romy Diaz	Philippines	Biographical action
Lethal Weapon 3	Richard Donner	Mel Gibson, Danny Glover, Joe Pesci	United States	
Live Wire	Christian Duguay	Pierce Brosnan, Ron Silver, Ben Cross	United States	Action thriller
Lucio Margallo	Augusto Salvador	Phillip Salvador, Miguel Rodriguez, Jean Garcia, Paquito Diaz, Max Laurel	Philippines	
Magdaleno Orbos: Sa Kuko ng Mga Lawin	Jose Balagtas	Eddie Garcia, Eddie Gutierrez, Charlie Davao, Star Querubin, Sheila Ysrael	Philippines	
Magnong Rehas	Manuel 'Fyke' Cinco	Raymart Santiago, Gelli de Belen, Julio Diaz, Roi Vinzon, Beth Bautista	Philippines	Action drama
Mandurugas	Eddie Rodriguez	Dennis Padilla, Donita Rose, Leah Orosa, Mia Prats, Janno Gibbs, Eddie Gutierrez, Roi Vinzon, Daniel Fernando	Philippines	Action comedy
The Master	Tsui Hark	Jet Li, Yuen Wah, Jerry Trimble	Hong Kong	Martial arts film
Mission of Justice	Steve Barnett	Jeff Wincott, Matthias Hues, Brigitte Nielsen	United States	Martial arts film
Mukhang Bungo: Da Coconut Nut	Felix E. Dalay	Redford White, Shiela Ysrael, Willie Revillame, Dindo Arroyo, Berting Labra	Philippines	Action comedy
Naked Killer	Clarence Fok	Carrie Ng, Kelly Yao, Yau Chingmy	Hong Kong	
Nemesis	Albert Pyun	Olivier Gruner, Cary-Hiroyuki Tagawa, Deborah Shelton	United States	Science fiction action
Once Upon a Time in China II	Tsui Hark	Jet Li, Rosamund Kwan, Donnie Yen	Hong Kong	
Passenger 57	Kevin Hooks	Wesley Snipes, Bruce Payne, Tom Sizemore	United States	
Pangako Sa'Yo	Pepe Marcos	Ramon "Bong" Revilla Jr., Sharon Cuneta, Edu Manzano, Pinky Amador, Caridad Sanchez, Chuckie Dreyfus, Donna Cruz	Philippines	Romantic action
Patayin si Billy Zapanta – Order of Battle: Enemy No. 1	Joey del Rosario	Ricky Davao, Johnny Delgado, Bembol Roco, Al Tantay, Edgar Mande	Philippines	
Patriot Games	Phillip Noyce	Harrison Ford, Anne Archer, Sean Bean	United States	
Pat. Omar Abdullah: Pulis Probinsya	Jose "Kaka" Balagtas	Phillip Salvador, Donita Rose, Rachel Lobangco, Eddie Gutierrez, Vic Vargas, Willie Revillame, Ruel Vernal, Atoy Co , Dindo Arroyo	Philippines	
Police Story 3: Super Cop	Stanley Tong	Jackie Chan, Michelle Yeoh, Maggie Cheung	Hong Kong	
Primitivo "Ebok" Ala: Kalabang Mortal ni Baby Ama	Junn P. Cabreira	Jeric Raval, John Regala, Cristina Gonzales, Bembol Roco	Philippines	
Rapid Fire	Dwight H. Little	Brandon Lee, Powers Boothe, Nick Mancuso	United States	
Sgt. Ernesto Baliola: Tinik sa Batas	Ricardo "Bebong" Osorio	Sonny Parsons, Efren Reyes, Aurora Sevilla, Dindo Arroyo, Shirley Tesoro	Philippines	
Shotgun Banjo	Joey del Rosario	Zoren Legaspi, Ruffa Gutierrez, Miguel Rodriguez, Paquito Diaz, Jess Lapid Jr.	Philippines	
Snake Eater III	George Erschbamer	Lorenzo Lamas	United States	
Sneakers	Phil Alden Robinson	Robert Redford, Sidney Poitier, Ben Kingsley	United States	Action thriller
Stop! Or My Mom Will Shoot	Roger Spottiswoode	Sylvester Stallone, Estelle Getty	United States	Action comedy
Talons of the Eagle	Michael Kennedy	Billy Blanks, Jalal Merhi, Matthias Hues, James Hong, Pan Qingfu	Canada	Martial arts film
Tondo: Libingan ng Mga Siga	Toto Natividad	John Regala, Efren Reyes, Raymond Bagatsing, Sheila Ysrael, Jessica Rodriguez	Philippines	
Totoy Guwapo: Alyas Kanto Boy	Toto Natividad	Ace Vergel, Aurora Sevilla, Sheila Ysrael, Willie Revillame, Bembol Roco, Rez Cortez, Roldan Aquino, Efren Reyes	Philippines	
Trancers III: Death Lives	C. Courtney Joyner	Ed Beechner	United States	Science fiction action, action thriller
Trespass	Walter Hill	Bill Paxton, Ice-T, Bill Sadler	United States	Action thriller
Twin Dragons	Ringo Lam, Tsui Hark	Jackie Chan, Maggie Cheung, Philip Chan	Hong Kong	
Under Siege	Andrew Davis	Steven Seagal, Tommy Lee Jones, Gary Busey	United States	
Universal Soldier	Roland Emmerich	Jean-Claude Van Damme, Dolph Lundgren, Ally Walker	United States	
The Wicked City	Peter Mak, Yuen Woo Ping	Jacky Cheung, Leon Lai, Tatsuya Nakadai	Hong Kong	
1993
Acción Mutante	Álex de la Iglesia	Antonio Resines, Frederique Feder, Alex Angulo	Spain	Science fiction action
Aguinaldo: Agila ng Cagayan	William G. Mayo	Lito Lapid, Aiko Melendez, Tony Ferrer, Jess Lapid, Sonny Parsons	Philippines	Biographical action
American Cyborg: Steel Warrior	Boaz Davidson	Joe Lara, Nicole Hansen, John Saint Ryan	United States	Science fiction action
American Ninja V	Bobby Gene Leonard	David Bradley, Norman Burton, Anne Dupont	United States	
American Yakuza	Frank Cappello	Viggo Mortensen, Ryo Ishibashi, Michael Nouri	United States	
Angel Terminators II	Wong Chun-yeung, Chan Lau	Sibelle Hu, Moon Lee, Yukari Oshima	Hong Kong	
The Avenging Quartet	Stanley Wing Siu	Cynthia Khan, Moon Lee, Yukari Oshima, Michiko Nishiwaki	Hong Kong	
Back in Action	Steve DiMarco, Paul Ziffer	Billy Blanks, Roddy Piper, Bobbie Phillips	Canada	
Batman: Mask of the Phantasm	Eric Radomski, Bruce Timm		United States	
Best of the Best 2	Robert Radler	Eric Roberts, Phillip Rhee, Chris Penn	United States	
The Black Panther Warriors	Clarence Fok	Clarence Fok, Tony Leung Kar-Fai, Brigitte Lin	Hong Kong	
Blade of Fury	Sammo Hung	Cynthia Khan, Rosamund Kwan, Ti Lung	Hong Kong	
Bodyguard Kiba	Takashi Miike	Hisao Maki, Masaru Matsuda, Takeshi Yamato	Japan	
Bounty Tracker	Kurt Anderson	Lorenzo Lamas, Matthias Hues, Cyndi Pass	Germany; United States	
The Bride with White Hair	Ronny Yu	Brigitte Lin, Leslie Cheung, Nam Kit-Ying	Hong Kong	Martial arts film
The Bride with White Hair 2	Ronny Yu, David Wu	Sunny Chan, Leslie Cheung, Christy Chung	Hong Kong	Martial arts film
Butterfly and Sword	Michael Mak	Donnie Yen, Michelle Yeoh, Tony Leung Chiu-Wai	Hong Kong	
Capt. Rassul Alih, Hindi Sayo ang Mindanao	Sonny Parsons, Jerry O. Tirazona	Sonny Parsons, Fred Moro, Melissa Mendez, Lani Lobangco, Patrick dela Rosa	Philippines	
CIA II: Target Alexa	Lorenzo Lamas	Lorenzo Lamas, Kathleen Kinmont, John Savage	United States	
Cliffhanger	Renny Harlin	Sylvester Stallone, John Lithgow, Michael Rooker	United States	
Crime Story	Kirk Wong	Jackie Chan, Kent Chang, Law Kar-ying	Hong Kong	
Cyborg Cop	Sam Firstenberg	David Bradley, John Rhys-Davies, Todd Jensen	United States	Science fiction action
Death Triangle	Kin-Kwok Lai	Cynthia Khan, Moon Lee, Yukari Oshima	Hong Kong	
Demolition Man	Marco Brambilla	Sylvester Stallone, Wesley Snipes, Sandra Bullock	United States	Science fiction action
Dino... Abangan Ang Susunod Na	Jose Javier Reyes	Anjo Yllana, Noel Trinidad , Tessie Tomas, Joey Marquez, Smokey Manaloto, William Martinez, Aiko Melendez	Philippines	Action comedy
Doring Dorobo: Hagupit ng Batas	Augusto Salvador	Eddie Garcia, Eddie Gutierrez, Boots Anson-Roa, Paquito Diaz, Dick Israel	Philippines	Biographical action
Dugo ng Panday	Peque Gallaga, Lore Reyes	Ramon "Bong" Revilla Jr., Aiko Melendez, Edu Manzano, Jimmy Fabregas, Leo Martinez	Philippines	Action fantasy
The Eagle Shooting Heroes	Jeffrey Lau	Leslie Cheung, Jacky Cheung, Tony Leung Chiu-Wai	Hong Kong	
Excessive Force	Jon Hess	Thomas Ian Griffith, Lance Henriksen, James Earl Jones, Tony Todd	United States	
Executioners	Ching Siu Tung	Anita Mui, Michelle Yeoh, Maggie Cheung	Hong Kong	
Extreme Justice	Mark L. Lester	Scott Glenn, Lou Diamond Phillips, Chelsea Field	United States	Action thriller
Firepower	Richard Pepin	Gary Daniels, Chad McQueen, George Murdock	United States	Science fiction action
Fong Sai-Yuk	Corey Yuen	Jet Li, Josephine Siao Fong-fong	Hong Kong	
Fong Sai-yuk II	Corey Yuen	Jet Li, Sibelle Hu, Amy Kwok	Hong Kong	
Fortress	Stuart Gordon	Christopher Lambert, Loryn Locklin, Kurtwood Smith	Australia; United States	
The Fugitive	Andrew Davis	Harrison Ford, Tommy Lee Jones	United States	Action thriller
Galvez: Hanggang sa Dulo ng Mundo Hahanapin Kita	Manuel "Fyke" Cinco	Eddie Garcia, Edu Manzano, Cristina Gonzales, Pilar Pilapil, Sunshine Cruz	Philippines	
Gascon, Bala ang Katapat Mo	Rogelio Salvador	Lito Lapid, Ruffa Gutierrez, Tirso Cruz III, Jess Lapid, Bob Soler	Philippines	Biographical action
Guns of Dragon	Leung Siu-lung	Mark Cheng, Steven Darrow, Alex Fong	Hong Kong	
Hard Target	John Woo	Jean-Claude Van Damme, Lance Henriksen, Arnold Vosloo	United States	
Hero Among Heroes	Yuen Woo Ping	Donnie Yen, Ng Man Tat, Ying Ng	Hong Kong	
Iron Monkey	Yuen Woo Ping	Yu Rongguang, Donnie Yen, Jean Wang	Hong Kong	
Isang Bala Ka Lang II	Ronwaldo Reyes	Fernando Poe Jr., Nanette Medved, Fred Montilla, Subas Herrero, Johnny Vicar, Zandro Zamora	Philippines	
Joshua Tree	Vic Armstrong	Dolph Lundgren, Kristian Alfonso, George Segal	United States	
Judgment Night	Stephen Hopkins	Emilio Estevez, Cuba Gooding Jr., Denis Leary	United States	Action thriller
Kahit Ako'y Busabos	Ricardo "Bebong" Osorio	Ace Vergel, Bing Loyzaga, Jenny Roa Mark Gil, Vic Vargas, Roi Vinzon, Rez Cortez, Lito Pimentel, Zandro Zamora	Philippines	
Kapatid Ko Si Hudas	Dante Javier	John Regala, Rando Almanzor, Sheila Ysrael, Tirso Cruz III, Lito Legaspi	Philippines	
Kung Fu Cult Master	Wong Jing	Jet Li, Ekin Cheng, Sammo Hung	Hong Kong	
Lady Dragon 2	David Worth	Adisoerya Abdi, Billy Drago, Bella Esperance	Indonesia	Martial arts film
Last Action Hero	John McTiernan	Arnold Schwarzenegger, Austin O'Brien, F. Murray Abraham	United States	
Last Hero in China	Wong Jing	Jet Li	Hong Kong	
Leonardo Delos Reyes, Alyas Waway	Toto Natividad	Cesar Montano, Jun Aristorenas, Cristina Gonzales, Bembol Roco, Joel Torre	Philippines	Biographical action thriller
Lethal Panther 2: Partners in Law	Philip Ko, Erwin Lanado	Edu Manzano, Cynthia Luster	Philippines; Hong Kong; Japan	
Lumaban Ka... Itay!	Francis 'Jun' Posadas	Jestoni Alarcon, Donita Rose, Roy Alvarez, Tobi Alejar, Gino Padilla	Philippines	
Maniac Cop 3: Badge of Silence	William Lustig, Joel Soisson	Robert Davi, Caitlin Dulany, Gretchen Becker	United States	
Manila Boy	Arturo San Agustin	Robin Padilla, Tony Ferrer, Aurora Sevilla	Philippines	Action comedy
Martial Outlaw	Kurt Anderson	Jeff Wincott, Gary Hudson, Richard Jaeckel	United States	Martial arts film
The Meteor Man	Robert Townsend	Robert Townsend, Marla Gibbs, Eddie Griffin	United States	Action comedy
Ninja Scroll	Yoshiaki Kawajiri	Koichi Yamadera, Emi Shinohara, Takeshi Aono	Japan	Animated film
Nowhere to Run	Robert Harmon	Jean-Claude Van Damme, Rosanna Arquette, Joss Ackland	United States	
Once a Cop	Stanley Tong	Michelle Yeoh, Yu Rongguang	Hong Kong	
Once Upon a Time in China III	Tsui Hark	Rosamund Kwan, Lau Shun, Jet Li	Hong Kong	
Once Upon a Time in China IV	Yuen Bun	Zhao Wenzhuo	Hong Kong	Martial arts film
Only the Strong	Sheldon Lettich	Mark Dacascos, Stacey Travis, Geoffrey Lewis	United States	
Point of No Return	John Badham	Bridget Fonda, Gabriel Byrne, Dermot Mulroney	United States	
Pugoy – Hostage: Davao	Francis "Jun" Posadas	Ian Veneracion, Lito Legaspi, Roy Alvarez, Gina Pangle, Mark Gil	Philippines	Biographical action thriller
Ronquillo: Tubong Cavite, Laking Tondo	Joey del Rosario	Ramon "Bong" Revilla Jr., Sheryl Cruz, Miguel Rodriguez, Dante Rivero, Ronaldo Valdez	Philippines	
Sala sa Init, Sala sa Lamig	Pepe Marcos	Ramon "Bong" Revilla Jr., Vina Morales, Mark Gil, Mia Prats, Teresa Loyzaga, Ruby Rodriguez, Smokey Manaloto, Johnny Delgado	Philippines	Romantic action
Sgt. Lando Liwanag: Vengador (Batas ng Api)	Erastheo J. Navoa	John Regala, Paquito Diaz, Efren Reyes, Dick Israel, Berting Labra	Philippines	
Shootfighter: Fight to the Death	Patrick Alan	Bolo Yeung, William Zabka, Martin Kove	United States	Martial arts film
Sniper	Luis Llosa	Tom Berenger, Billy Zane, J.T. Walsh	United States	
Street Knight	Albert Magnoli	Jeff Speakman, Christopher Neame, Bernie Casey	United States	
Striking Distance	Rowdy Herrington	Bruce Willis, Sarah Jessica Parker, Dennis Farina	United States	Action thriller
Surf Ninjas	Neal Israel	Ernie Reyes Jr., Rob Schneider, Nicolas Cowan	United States	Action comedy
Tai Chi Master	Yuen Woo Ping	Jet Li, Michelle Yeoh	Hong Kong	
Task Force Habagat	Romy V. Suzara	Edu Manzano, Maita Sanchez, George Estregan Jr., Paquito Diaz, Bomber Moran	Philippines	Biographical action
TC 2000	T. J. Scott	Billy Blanks, Jalal Merhi, Bolo Yeung, Matthias Hues	Canada; United States	Science fiction action
Teenage Mutant Ninja Turtles III	Stuart Gillard	Paige Turco, Stuart Wilson, Vivian Wu	United States	
Ultracop 2000	Philip Ko	Yukari Oshima, Philip Ko, Ricky Davao	Philippines; Hong Kong	Action comedy, martial arts film
Undercover Blues	Herbert Ross	Kathleen Turner, Dennis Quaid, Fiona Shaw	United States	Action comedy
Undefeatable	Godfrey Hall	Cynthia Rothrock, Don Niam, John Miller	Hong Kong	Martial arts film
1994
Ashes of Time	Wong Kar-wai	Brigitte Lin, Leslie Cheung, Maggie Cheung	Hong Kong	Martial arts film
Baby Paterno (Dugong Pulis)	Jose 'Kaka' Balagtas	Roi Vinzon, Sunshine Cruz, Dante Rivero, Paquito Diaz, Dick Israel	Philippines	
Bad Blood	Tibor Takács	Lorenzo Lamas, Frankie Thorn, Hank Cheyne	United States	
Bala at Lipstick	Maryo J. de los Reyes	Roderick Paulate, Dindi Gallardo, Zoren Legazpi	Philippines	Action comedy
Bawal Na Gamot	Francis "Jun" Posadas	Romnick Sarmenta, Aiko Melendez, Gardo Versoza, Boots Anson-Roa, Dante Rivero	Philippines	Action crime
Beverly Hills Cop III	John Landis	Eddie Murphy, Judge Reinhold, Hector Elizondo	United States	Action comedy
Blankman	Mike Binder	Damon Wayans, David Alan Grier	United States	Action comedy
Blown Away	Stephen Hopkins	Jeff Bridges, Tommy Lee Jones, Lloyd Bridges	United States	Action thriller
The Bodyguard from Beijing	Corey Yuen	Jet Li, Christy Chung, Kent Cheng	Hong Kong	
Burning Paradise	Ringo Lam	Willie Chi, Lin Quan, Yang Sheng	Hong Kong	
The Chase	Adam Rifkin	Charlie Sheen, Kristy Swanson, Henry Rollins	United States	
Chinatown 2: The Vigilantes	Manuel Marcos, Roger Baruelo	Monsour del Rosario, Baldo Marro, Dawn Zulueta	Philippines	
Clear and Present Danger	Phillip Noyce	Harrison Ford, Willem Dafoe, Anne Archer	United States	
Col. Billy Bibit, RAM	William Mayo	Rommel Padilla, Daniel Fernando, Paquito Diaz, Efren Reyes Jr., E. R. Ejercito	Philippines	Biographical action
The Cowboy Way	Gregg Champion	Woody Harrelson, Kiefer Sutherland, Dylan McDermott	United States	
The Crow	Alex Proyas	Brandon Lee, Ernie Hudson, Michael Wincott	United States	
CyberTracker	Richard Pepin	Don "The Dragon" Wilson, Richard Norton, Stacie Foster	United States	Science fiction action
Deadly Target	Charla Driver	Gary Daniels, Max Gail, Byron Mann	United States	
Death Wish V: The Face of Death	Allan A. Goldstein	Charles Bronson, Lesley-Anne Down, Michael Parks	United States	
Double Dragon	James Yukich	Robert Patrick, Mark Dacascos, Scott Wolf	United States	Martial arts film
Drop Zone	John Badham	Wesley Snipes, Gary Busey, Yancy Butler	United States	
Drunken Master II	Lau Kar-Leung	Jackie Chan, Ti Lung	Hong Kong	
Epimaco Velasco: NBI	Edgardo "Boy" Vinarao	Fernando Poe Jr., Charlene Gonzales, Jackie Aquino, Tirso Cruz III, Jess Lapid Jr.	Philippines	Biographical action
Fist of Legend	Gordon Chan	Jet Li, Paul Chiang, Chin Siu Ho	Hong Kong	
Gen. Tapia: Sa Nagbabagang Lupa	Roland Ledesma	Ronnie Ricketts, Ronald Gan Ledesma, Daniel Fernando, Lovely Rivero, Sheila Ysrael, Rachel Lobangco, Rez Cortez	Philippines	Biographical action
Geron Olivar	Jesus Jose	Lito Lapid, Edu Manzano, Zoren Legaspi, Kris Aquino, Nida Blanca	Philippines	
The Getaway	Roger Donaldson	Alec Baldwin, Kim Basinger, Michael Madsen	United States	
God of Gamblers' Return	Wong Jing	Chow Yun-Fat, Charles Heung, Tony Leung Kar-Fai	Hong Kong	
Gunmen	Deran Sarafian	Christopher Lambert, Mario Van Peebles, Denis Leary	United States	
Hellbound	Aaron Norris	Chuck Norris, Calvin Levels, Christopher Neame	United States	
Ismael Zacarias	Toto Natividad	Edu Manzano, Eddie Gutierrez, Plinky Recto, Roi Vinzon, Alfred Manal	Philippines	
Iukit Mo sa Bala	Pepe Marcos	Ramon "Bong" Revilla Jr., Gabby Concepcion, Nanette Medved, Mat Ranillo III, Luis Gonzales	Philippines	
Ka Hector	Toto Natividad	Phillip Salvador, Dina Bonnevie, Gardo Versoza, Efren Reyes, Willie Revillame	Philippines	Biographical action
Kanto Boy 2: Anak ni Totoy Guapo	Augusto Salvador	Ian Veneracion, Kimberly Diaz, Ramon Christopher, Dick Israel, Bunny Paras	Philippines	
Lab Kita, Bilib Ka Ba?	Gene Palomo	Robin Padilla, Ruffa Gutierrez, Jaclyn Jose, Jess Lapid, Gabriel Romulo, Dan Alvaro	Philippines	Romantic action
Lagalag: The Eddie Fernandez Story	Romy V. Suzara	Rudy Fernandez, Dawn Zulueta, Tirso Cruz III, Rosa Rosal, Jess Lapid	Philippines	Biographical action drama
Léon: The Professional	Luc Besson	Jean Reno, Gary Oldman, Natalie Portman	France	Action thriller
Love on Delivery	Stephen Chow, Lee Lik-chee		Hong Kong	
A Low Down Dirty Shame	Keenen Ivory Wayans	Keenen Ivory Wayans, Charles S. Dutton, Jada Pinkett Smith	United States	
Maestro Toribio (Sentensyador)	Jose N. Carreon	Eddie Garcia, Tirso Cruz III, Lito Legaspi, Patrick dela Rosa, Ramon Christopher	Philippines	
Macario Durano	Joey del Rosario	Lito Lapid, Sheryl Cruz, Mat Ranillo III, Efren Reyes Jr., Johnny Delgado	Philippines	
Markadong Hudas	Eddie Rodriguez	Cesar Montano, Dina Bonnevie, Jun Aristorenas, Daniel Fernando, Teresa Loyzaga	Philippines	
Mars Ravelo's Darna! Ang Pagbabalik	Peque Gallaga; Lore Reyes	Anjanette Abayari, Edu Manzano, Rustom Padilla, Bong Alvarez, Pilita Corrales	Philippines	Superhero
Matinik Na Kalaban	Leonardo L. Garcia	Ronnie Ricketts, Cristina Gonzales, Mariz, Tony Ferrer, Jess Lapid Jr.	Philippines	
Men of War	Perry Lang	Dolph Lundgren, Charlotte Lewis, B.D. Wong	United States	
Mistah	Ricardo Osorio	Robin Padilla, Rustom Padilla, Rommel Padilla	Philippines	
Nagkataon, Nagkatagpo	Augusto Salvador	Rudy Fernandez, Maricel Soriano, Eddie Rodriguez, Efren Reyes Jr., Michael de Mesa, Bembol Roco, Dick Israel	Philippines	Action comedy romance
The New Legend Of Shaolin	Corey Yuen, Wong Jing	Jet Li, Chuen-Hua Chi, Chen Sung-Yung	Hong Kong	
No Escape	Martin Campbell	Ray Liotta, Lance Henriksen, Stuart Wilson	United States	
On Deadly Ground	Steven Seagal	Steven Seagal, Michael Caine, Joan Chen	United States	
Once Upon a Time in Manila	Tony Y. Reyes	Vic Sotto, Cynthia Luster, Gloria Sevilla, Tiya Pusit, Ruby Rodriguez	Philippines	Action comedy
P're Hanggang sa Huli	Ricardo "Bebong" Osorio	Robin Padilla, Andrew E., Charlene Gonzales, Donita Rose, Mat Ranillo III	Philippines	Action comedy
Pedrito Masangkay: Walang Bakas Na Iniiwan	Francis 'Jun' Posadas	Ian Veneracion, Andy Poe, Cristina Gonzales, Elizabeth Tamayo, Dick Israel	Philippines	Action thriller
The River Wild	Curtis Hanson	Meryl Streep, Kevin Bacon, David Strathairn	United States	
Satin Steel	Siu Lung Leung	Jade Leung, Russell Wong, Kenneth Chan Kai-tai	Hong Kong	
The Shadow	Russell Mulcahy	Alec Baldwin, John Lone, Penelope Ann Miller	United States	
The Specialist	Luis Llosa	Sylvester Stallone, Sharon Stone, James Woods	United States	
Speed	Jan de Bont	Keanu Reeves, Dennis Hopper, Sandra Bullock	United States	
Street Fighter	Steven E. de Souza	Jean-Claude Van Damme, Raúl Juliá, Ming-Na Wen	United States	
Street Fighter II: The Animated Movie	Gisaburo Sugii		Japan; United States	
Surviving the Game	Ernest R. Dickerson	Ice-T, Rutger Hauer, Charles S. Dutton	United States	
Terminal Velocity	Deran Sarafian	Charlie Sheen, Nastassja Kinski, James Gandolfini	United States	
Timecop	Peter Hyams	Jean-Claude Van Damme, Mia Sara, Ron Silver	United States	
True Lies	James Cameron	Arnold Schwarzenegger, Jamie Lee Curtis, Tom Arnold	United States	
Ultimatum	Cirio Santiago	Eddie Garcia, Dina Bonnevie, Vernon Wells	Philippines; United States	
Wing Chun	Yuen Woo Ping	Michelle Yeoh, Donnie Yen, Cheng Pei-pei	Hong Kong	
Walang Matigas Na Pulis sa Matinik Na Misis	Danilo P. Cabreira	Ramon "Bong" Revilla Jr., Lani Mercado, Jimmy Santos, Tessie Tomas, King Gutierrez	Philippines	Action comedy
Wonder Seven	Ching Siu Tung	Chin Ho, Li Ning, Michelle Yeoh	Hong Kong	
1995
Adan Lazaro	Pepe Marcos	Roi Vinzon, Sunshine Cruz, Jeanette Fernando, Eddie Rodriguez, Tony Ferrer	Philippines	
Alfredo Lim: Batas ng Maynila	Ramon Jesus "Ramje" Capinpin	Eddie Garcia, Dang Cecilio, Jojo Alejar, Dick Israel, Ruel Vernal, Romy Diaz, Dan Fernandez, Rod Navarro	Philippines	Biographical action
Asero	Joey del Rosario	Cesar Montano, Ricky Davao, Gelli de Belen, Bembol Roco, Al Tantay	Philippines	
Assassins	Richard Donner	Sylvester Stallone, Antonio Banderas, Julianne Moore	United States	
Bad Boys	Michael Bay	Will Smith, Martin Lawrence, Téa Leoni	United States	
Best of the Best 3	Phillip Rhee	Phillip Rhee, Christopher McDonald, Gina Gershon	United States	Martial arts Film
Batman Forever	Joel Schumacher	Val Kilmer, Tommy Lee Jones, Jim Carrey	United States	
The Blade	Tsui Hark	Vincent Zhao, Moses Chan, Xiong Xinxin	Hong Kong	
Congo	Frank Marshall	Dylan Walsh, Laura Linney, Ernie Hudson	United States	
Costales	Jose N. Carreon; Toto Natividad	Edu Manzano, Gretchen Barretto, Sunshine Cruz, Monsour del Rosario, Anthony Alonzo	Philippines	
Crimson Tide	Tony Scott	Denzel Washington, Gene Hackman, George Dzundza	United States	
Crying Freeman	Christophe Gans	Mark Dacascos, Julie Condra, Tchéky Karyo	France; Canada	
The Demolitionist	Robert Kurtzman	Nicole Eggert, Richard Grieco, Bruce Abbott	United States	Science fiction action
Desperado	Robert Rodriguez	Antonio Banderas, Salma Hayek, Joaquim de Almeida	United States	
Die Hard with a Vengeance	John McTiernan	Bruce Willis, Jeremy Irons, Samuel L. Jackson	United States	
Don't Give a Damn	Sammo Hung	Sammo Hung, Yuen Biao	Hong Kong	
The Expert	William Lustig	Jeff Speakman, James Brolin, Jim Varney	United States	
Fair Game	Andrew Sipes	William Baldwin, Cindy Crawford, Steven Berkoff	United States	
Fist of the North Star	Tony Randel	Gary Daniels, Chris Penn, Malcolm McDowell	United States	Martial arts film
Fox Hunter	Stephen Wai Tung	Jade Leung, Jordan Chan, Rongguang Yu	Hong Kong; China	
Garōden	Masato Sasaki	Kenji Yamaki, Yūki Ishiyama, Yoshiaki Fujiwara	Japan	
Gising Na ang Higanteng Natutulog	Arturo San Agustin	Andy Poe, Romy Diaz, Bob Soler, Star, Glenda Garcia	Philippines	
GoldenEye	Martin Campbell	Pierce Brosnan, Sean Bean, Izabella Scorupco	United Kingdom	
The Grepor Butch Belgica Story	Toto Natividad	Joko Diaz, Ronaldo Valdez, Boots Anson-Roa, Albert Martinez, Gary Estrada	Philippines	Biographical action
Hanggang sa Huling Bala	Jose N. Carreon	Lito Lapid, Plinky Recto, Dennis Roldan, Sharmaine Suarez, CJ Ramos	Philippines	
Heat	Michael Mann	Al Pacino, Robert De Niro, Val Kilmer	United States	
High Risk	Corey Yuen, Wong Jing	Jet Li, Jacky Cheung, Yau Chingmy	Hong Kong	
The Hunted	J.F. Lawton	Christopher Lambert, John Lone, Joan Chen	United States	
Iligpit si Bobby Ortega: Markang Bungo 2	Eddie Rodriguez	Rudy Fernandez, Anthony Alonzo, Bing Loyzaga, Rez Cortez, Joey Padilla, Manjo del Mundo, Lito Legaspi	Philippines	Biographical action
Johnny Mnemonic	Robert Longo	Keanu Reeves, Dolph Lundgren, Beat Takeshi Kitano	Canada	
Judge Dredd	Danny Cannon	Sylvester Stallone, Armand Assante, Diane Lane	United States	Science fiction action
Kamikaze Taxi	Masato Harada	Takeshi Caesar, Chika Nakagami, Mickey Curtis	Japan	
Last Man Standing	Joseph Merhi	Jeff Wincott, Jillian McWhirter, Jonathan Fuller	United States	
Matimbang Pa sa Dugo	Jose N. Carreon	Rudy Fernandez, Mark Anthony Fernandez, Sharmaine Arnaiz, Ana Roces, Robert Arevalo	Philippines	
Melencio Magat: Dugo Laban sa Dugo	Toto Natividad	Eddie Garcia, Zoren Legaspi, Jeric Raval, Jun Aristorenas, Dick Israel	Philippines	
Midnight Man	John Weidner	Lorenzo Lamas, James Lew, Mako	United States	
Money Train	Joseph Ruben	Wesley Snipes, Woody Harrelson	United States	
Mortal Kombat	Paul W. S. Anderson	Robin Shou, Linden Ashby, Bridgette Wilson	United States	
My Father Is a Hero	Corey Yuen	Jet Li, Anita Mui, Tsue Miu	Hong Kong	
No Way Back	Frank Cappello	Russell Crowe, Helen Slater, Etsushi Toyokawa	United States; Japan	
Omar Abdullah, Pulis Probinsya 2: Tapusin Na Natin Ang Laban	Augusto Salvador	Phillip Salvador, Sheryl Cruz, Janus del Prado, Eddie Gutierrez, Julio Diaz, Al Tantay, Willie Revillame, Atoy Co	Philippines	
One Tough Bastard	Kurt Wimmer	Brian Bosworth, Bruce Payne, M.C. Hammer	United States	Action thriller
Outbreak	Wolfgang Petersen	Dustin Hoffman, Rene Russo, Morgan Freeman	United States	Action thriller
Pamilya Valderama	Augusto Salvador	Phillip Salvador, John Regala, Nanette Medved, Paquito Diaz, Shirley Fuentes	Philippines	
Peace Hotel	Wai Ka-fai	Chow Yun-Fat	Hong Kong	
Pustahan Tayo, Mahal Mo Ako	Danilo P. Cabriera	Ramon "Bong" Revilla Jr., Maricel Soriano, Miguel Rodriguez, Lito Legaspi, Ruby Rodriguez, Nino Muhlach, Jennifer Mendoza	Philippines	Action comedy romance
Rage	Joseph Merhi	Gary Daniels, Kenneth Tigar, Fiona Hutchison	United States	
The Red Wolf	Yuen Woo-ping	Kenny Ho, Christy Chung, Elaine Lui	Hong Kong	
Rumble in the Bronx	Stanley Tong	Jackie Chan, Anita Mui, Bill Tung	Hong Kong	
Screamers	Christian Duguay	Ron White, Peter Weller, Jennifer Rubin	United States; Canada; Japan	Action thriller
Soldier Boyz	Louis Mourneau	Michael Dudikoff, Cary-Hiroyuki Tagawa, Tyrin Turner	United States	
Sudden Death	Peter Hyams	Jean-Claude Van Damme, Powers Boothe, Raymond J. Barry	United States	
Ang Syota Kong Balikbayan	Pablo Santiago	Fernando Poe Jr., Anjanette Abayari, Maritoni Fernandez, Dencio Padilla, Boy Alano, Paquito Diaz, Max Alvarado, Jimmy Fabregas, Romy Diaz	Philippines	Action comedy romance
Tank Girl	Rachel Talalay	Lori Petty, Malcolm McDowell, Ice-T	United States	Action comedy
Thunderbolt	Gordon Chan	Jackie Chan, Anita Yuen, Chor Yuen	Hong Kong	
Ang Titser Kong Pogi	Danilo Cabreira	Ramon "Bong" Revilla Jr., Sunshine Cruz, Ruby Rodriguez, Tom Taus, Mely Tagasa, Dick Israel, Jeorge Estregan, King Gutierrez, Edwin Reyes	Philippines	Action musical comedy
Top Dog	Aaron Norris	Chuck Norris, Clyde Kusatsu, Michele Lamar Richards	United States	
Tough and Deadly	Steve Cohen	Billy Blanks, Roddy Piper, Richard Norton	United States	
Under Siege 2: Dark Territory	Geoff Murphy	Steven Seagal, Eric Bogosian, Katherine Heigl	United States	
Urban Rangers	Jose Balagtas	Raymart Santiago, Jay Manalo, Ace Espinosa, Joko Diaz	Philippines	
Waterworld	Kevin Reynolds	Kevin Costner, Dennis Hopper, Jeanne Tripplehorn	United States	
Zero Woman	Daisuke Gotoh	Natsuke Ozawa	Japan	
Zero Woman: Final Mission	Koji Enokido	Naoko Iijima	Japan	
1996
'Wag Na 'Wag Kang Lalayo	Jose N. Carreon	Rudy Fernandez, Vina Morales, Tonton Gutierrez, Eddie Rodriguez, Robert Arevalo	Philippines	
Bagsik ng Kamao	Leonardo L. Garcia	Edu Manzano, Luisito Espinosa, Sharmaine Suarez, Jess Lapid Jr., Charlie Davao	Philippines	
Barb Wire	David Hogan	Pamela Anderson, Temuera Morrison, Victoria Rowell	United States	
Batas Ko Ay Bala	Augusto Salvador	Cesar Montano, Donita Rose, John Regala, Efren Reyes Jr., Bob Soler	Philippines	
Beyond Hypothermia	Patrick Leung	Lau Ching-Wan, Wu Chien-lien, Han Sang-woo	Hong Kong	
Big Bullet	Benny Chan	Lau Ching-Wan, Francis Ng	Hong Kong	
Bilang Na ang Araw Mo	Toto Natividad	Cesar Montano, Rustom Padilla, Charlene Gonzales, Dennis Roldan, Willie Revillame	Philippines	
Black Mask	Daniel Lee	Jet Li	Hong Kong	
Broken Arrow	John Woo	John Travolta, Christian Slater, Samantha Mathis	United States	
Bulletproof	Ernest R. Dickerson	Damon Wayans, Adam Sandler	United States	
Chain Reaction	Andrew Davis	Keanu Reeves, Morgan Freeman, Rachel Weisz	United States	
The Chinese Feast	Tsui Hark	Kenny Bee, Leslie Cheung	Hong Kong	Action comedy, martial arts film
The Crow: City of Angels	Tim Pope	Vincent Perez, Mia Kirshner, Richard Brooks	United States	
Daylight	Rob Cohen	Sylvester Stallone, Amy Brenneman, Viggo Mortensen	United States	
Dr. Wai in "The Scripture with No Words"	Ching Siu Tung	Takeshi Kaneshiro, Charlie Yeung, Jet Li	Hong Kong	
Emong Salvacion: Humanda Ka, Oras Mo Na!	Francis "Jun" Posadas	Eddie Garcia, Gardo Versoza, Raymond Keannu, Beth Tamayo, Gloria Ortega	Philippines	
Eraser	Chuck Russell	Arnold Schwarzenegger, James Caan, Vanessa L. Williams	United States	
Escape from L.A.	John Carpenter	Kurt Russell, Stacy Keach, Steve Buscemi	United States	
Executive Decision	Stuart Baird	Kurt Russell, Halle Berry, John Leguizamo	United States	
First Option	Gordon Chan	Michael Wong, Gigi Leung, Damian Lau	Hong Kong	
Fled	Kevin Hooks	Laurence Fishburne, Stephen Baldwin, Salma Hayek	United States	
Forbidden City Cop	Kok Tak-Chiu, Stephen Chow	Stephen Chow, Carina Lau, Carman Lee	Hong Kong	
From Dusk till Dawn	Robert Rodriguez	George Clooney, Quentin Tarantino, Harvey Keitel	United States	Action horror
Ghost in the Shell	Mamoru Oshii		Japan	Science fiction action
The Glimmer Man	John Gray	Steven Seagal, Keenen Ivory Wayans, Bob Gunton	United States	
God of Cookery	Li Lik-Chi, Stephen Chow	Stephen Chow, Karen Mok, Nancy Sit	Hong Kong	Action comedy
Hangga't May Hininga	Toto Natividad	Phillip Salvador, Anjanette Abayari, Jackie Lou Blanco, Tirso Cruz III, Dennis Roldan	Philippines	
Hawak Ko Buhay Mo	Ronn Rick	Ronnie Ricketts, Michelle Aldana, Michael de Mesa, Efren Reyes Jr., Jessa Zaragoza	Philippines	
Hawk's Vengeance	Marc F. Voizard	Gary Daniels, Jayne Heitmeyer, Cass Magda	Canada; United States	
Independence Day	Roland Emmerich	Will Smith, Bill Pullman, Jeff Goldblum	United States	Science fiction action
Iron Monkey 2	Zhao Lu Jiang	Donnie Yen, Wu Ma, Billy Chow	Hong Kong	
Itataya Ko ang Buhay Ko	Jose N. Carreon	Rudy Fernandez, Ricky Davao, Mat Ranillo III, Mark Gil, Pia Pilapil	Philippines	
Last Man Standing	Walter Hill	Bruce Willis, Christopher Walken, Bruce Dern	United States	
Leon Cordero: Duwag Lang ang Hahalik sa Lupa	Baldo Marro	Raymart Santiago, Jennifer Mendoza, Lailani Navarro, Eddie Gutierrez, Marita Zobel	Philippines	
The Long Kiss Goodnight	Renny Harlin	Geena Davis, Samuel L. Jackson, Patrick Malahide	United States	
Madaling Mamatay, Mahirap Mabuhay	Ronn-Rick	Ronnie Ricketts, Mariz, Mark Gil, Dindi Gallardo, German Moreno	Philippines	
Maximum Risk	Ringo Lam	Jean-Claude Van Damme, Natasha Henstridge	United States	
Medrano	Joey del Rosario	Gardo Versoza, Sunshine Cruz, Dennis Roldan, Efren Reyes Jr., Assunta de Rossi	Philippines	
Mercenary	Avi Nesher	Olivier Gruner, John Ritter, Robert Culp	United States	
Mission: Impossible	Brian De Palma	Tom Cruise, Jon Voight, Emmanuelle Béart	United States	
Night Hunter	Rick Jacobson	Don Wilson, Maria Ford	United States	Action thriller
Police Story 4: First Strike	Stanley Tong	Jackie Chan	Hong Kong; United States	
Ang Probinsyano	Ronwaldo Reyes	Fernando Poe Jr., Dindi Gallardo, Amanda Page, Amado Cortez, Melisse "Mumay" Santiago	Philippines	
The Quest	Jean-Claude Van Damme	Jean-Claude Van Damme, Roger Moore, James Remar	United States	
The Rock	Michael Bay	Nicolas Cage, Sean Connery, Ed Harris	United States	
Rubberman	Edgardo "Boy" Vinarao	Michael V, Beth Tamayo	Philippines	Superhero action comedy
Sa Kamay ng Batas	Pepe Marcos	Edu Manzano, John Estrada, Eric Fructuoso, Dennis Roldan, Alma Concepcion	Philippines	
Sabotage	Tibor Takács	Mark Dacascos, Carrie-Anne Moss, Tony Todd	Canada	
Sci-Fighters	Peter Svatek	Roddy Piper, Jayne Heitmeyer, Billy Drago	United States	Science fiction action, action thriller
Set It Off	F. Gary Gray	Jada Pinkett Smith, Queen Latifah, Vivica A. Fox	United States	
Silent Trigger	Russell Mulcahy	Dolph Lundgren, Gina Bellman, Conrad Dunn	United States	
Shootfighter 2	Paul Ziller	Bolo Yeung, William Zabka, Michael Bernardo	United States	Martial arts film
Solo	Norberto Barba	Mario Van Peebles, Barry Corbin, Bill Sadler	United States	
SPO4 Santiago: Sharpshooter	Pepe Marcos	Ramon "Bong" Revilla Jr., Ina Raymundo, Tonton Gutierrez, Raymond Bagatsing, King Gutierrez	Philippines	Biographical action
The Substitute	Robert Mandel	Tom Berenger, Ernie Hudson, Diane Venora	United States	
Tubusin Mo ng Bala ang Puso Ko	Toto Natividad	Edu Manzano, Anjanette Abayari, Mark Gil, Bembol Roco, Jeanette Fernando	Philippines	
Twister	Jan de Bont	Helen Hunt, Bill Paxton, Cary Elwes	United States	Disaster
Utol	Toto Natividad	Cesar Montano, Eddie Gutierrez, Alma Concepcion, Victor Neri, Bing Davao	Philippines	
Vampirella	Jim Wynorski	Talisa Soto, Roger Daltrey, Richard Joseph Paul	United States	Science fiction action
White Tiger	Richard Martin	Gary Daniels, Mig Macario, Cary-Hiroyuki Tagawa	Canada; United States	
Young and Dangerous	Andrew Lau	Chan Sau-yu, Jordan Chan	Hong Kong	
Young and Dangerous 2	Andrew Lau	Jordan Chan, Cheng Yee-kin, Yau Chingmy	Hong Kong	
Young and Dangerous 3	Andrew Lau	Jordan Chan, Cheng Yee-kin, Roy Cheung	Hong Kong	
1997
Air Force One	Wolfgang Petersen	Harrison Ford, Gary Oldman, Glenn Close	United States	Action thriller
Bala para sa Katarungan	Sonny Parsons	Sonny Parsons, Joanne Quintas, Elizabeth Oropesa, Bernard Bonnin, Gloria Sevilla	Philippines	
Batman & Robin	Joel Schumacher	Arnold Schwarzenegger, George Clooney, Chris O'Donnell	United States	
Beverly Hills Ninja	Dennis Dugan	Chris Farley, Nicollette Sheridan, Robin Shou	United States	Action comedy
Bloodmoon	Tony Leung Siu Hung	Gary Daniels, Chuck Jeffreys, Darren Shahlavi	United States	Martial arts film
Boy Buluran	Ronn-Rick	Ronnie Ricketts, Ina Raymundo, Mark Gil, Roy Alvarez, Jay Manalo	Philippines	
Cobra	Arturo "Boy" San Agustin	Dan Fernandez, Lito Legaspi, Paquito Diaz, Romy Diaz, Ruel Vernal	Philippines	
Con Air	Simon West	Nicolas Cage, John Cusack, John Malkovich	United States	
Conspiracy Theory	Richard Donner	Mel Gibson, Julia Roberts, Patrick Stewart	United States	
Double Team	Tsui Hark	Jean-Claude Van Damme, Dennis Rodman, Mickey Rourke	United States	
Drive	Steve Wang	Mark Dacascos, Kadeem Hardison, Brittany Murphy	United States	
Eseng ng Tondo	Ronwaldo Reyes; Augusto Salvador	Fernando Poe Jr., Ina Raymundo, Jenny Syquia, Chuck Perez, Mandy Ochoa	Philippines	Biographical action
Face/Off	John Woo	Nicolas Cage, John Travolta, Joan Allen	United States	
The Fifth Element	Luc Besson	Bruce Willis, Gary Oldman, Milla Jovovich	France	Science fiction action
Fire Down Below	Félix Enríquez Alcalá	Steven Seagal, Marg Helgenberger, Harry Dean Stanton	United States	
Full Alert	Ringo Lam	Lau Ching-Wan, Francis Ng, Blacky Ko	Hong Kong	
Full Metal Yakuza	Takashi Miike	Tsuyoshi Ujiki, Shoko Nakahara, Tomorowo Taguchi	Japan	Science fiction action
Haragan: Masahol Pa sa Bala	Efren C. Piñon	Monsour del Rosario, Alma Concepcion, Mike Gayoso, Amado Cortez, Luiz Gonzales	Philippines	
Heaven's Burning	Craig Lahiff	Russell Crowe, Youki Kudoh, Kenji Isomura	Australia	
Ilaban Mo... Bayan Ko! The Obet Pagdanganan Story	Carlo J. Caparas	Joel Torre, Ronnie Rickets, Elizabeth Oropesa, Ronnie Lazaro, Sen. Raul Roco	Philippines	Biographical action
The Jackal	Michael Caton-Jones	Bruce Willis, Richard Gere, Sidney Poitier	United States	Action thriller
Kasangga Mo Ako Hanggang sa Huling Laban	Philip Ko; Teddy Gomez	Lito Lapid, Nanette Medved, Chuck Perez, Eddie Gutierrez, Matt Ranillo III	Philippines	
Lifeline	Johnnie To	Lau Ching-Wan, Alex Fong Chung-sun, Ruby Wong	Hong Kong	
Matang Agila	Philip Ko; Teddy Gomez	Monsour del Rosario, Anjanette Abayari, Zoren Legaspi, Raymond Keanu, Shiela Ysrael	Philippines	
Men in Black	Barry Sonnenfeld	Tommy Lee Jones, Will Smith, Vincent D'Onofrio	United States	
Metro	Thomas Carter	Eddie Murphy, Michael Rapaport, Michael Wincott	United States	
Money Talks	Brett Ratner	Chris Tucker, Charlie Sheen, Paul Sorvino	United States	
Mortal Kombat Annihilation	John R. Leonetti	Robin Shou, Talisa Soto, James Remar	United States	
Most Wanted	David Hogan	Keenen Ivory Wayans, Jon Voight	United States	Action thriller
Mr. Nice Guy	Sammo Hung	Jackie Chan, Richard Norton, Gabrielle Fitzpatrick	Hong Kong	
Once Upon a Time in China and America	Sammo Hung	Jet Li, Rosamund Kwan, Xiong Xin Xin	Hong Kong	
The Peacemaker	Mimi Leder	George Clooney, Nicole Kidman	United States	
The Saint	Phillip Noyce	Val Kilmer, Elisabeth Shue, Rade Serbedzija	United States	
Spawn	Mark A.Z. Dippé	Michael Jai White, John Leguizamo, Martin Sheen	United States	Superhero film
Speed 2: Cruise Control	Jan de Bont	Sandra Bullock, Jason Patric, Willem Dafoe	United States	
Starship Troopers	Paul Verhoeven	Casper Van Dien, Dina Meyer, Denise Richards	United States	Action thriller
Steel	Kenneth Johnson	Shaquille O'Neal, Annabeth Gish, Judd Nelson	United States	
Strategic Command	Rick Jacobson	Michael Dudikoff, Paul Winfield, Richard Norton	United States	Action thriller
Tapang sa Tapang	Francis 'Jun' Posadas	Lito Lapid, Cynthia Luster, Jess Lapid Jr., Efren Reyes Jr., Bob Soler	Philippines	
Task Force	Patrick Leung	Leo Ku, Charlie Yeung, Eric Tsang	Hong Kong	
Tomorrow Never Dies	Roger Spottiswoode	Pierce Brosnan, Jonathan Pryce, Michelle Yeoh	United States	Action thriller
True Vengeance	David Worth	Daniel Bernhardt, Beverly Johnson, Miles O'Keeffe	United States	
Turbulence	Robert Butler	Ray Liotta, Lauren Holly, Brendan Gleeson	United States	
Volcano	Mick Jackson	Tommy Lee Jones, Anne Heche, Gaby Hoffmann	United States	
Young and Dangerous 4	Andrew Lau	Cheng Yee-kin, Jordan Chan	Hong Kong	Martial arts film
1998
Alamid, Ang Alamat	Dan Alvaro	Dan Alvaro, Mickey Ferriols, Maggie Dela Riva, Bernard Bonnin, Gabriel Romulo, Dick Israel, Rina Reyes	Philippines	Superhero action
Another Meltdown	Allun Lam	Zhao Wenzhuo, Shu Qi, Andrew Lin	China	
Armageddon	Michael Bay	Bruce Willis, Billy Bob Thornton, Ben Affleck	United States	
The Avengers	Jeremiah S. Chechik	Uma Thurman, Ralph Fiennes, Sean Connery	United States	
Ballistic Kiss	Donnie Yen	Donnie Yen, Annie Wu, Jimmy Wong	Hong Kong	
Beast Cops	Gordon Chan, Dante Lam	Michael Wong, Anthony Wong, Kathy Chau	Hong Kong	
Best of the Best 4	Phillip Rhee	Phillip Rhee, Ernie Hudson	United States	Martial arts film
The Big Hit	Che-Kirk Wong	Mark Wahlberg, Lou Diamond Phillips, Christina Applegate	United States	
Black Dog	Kevin Hooks	Patrick Swayze, Meat Loaf, Randy Travis	United States	
Blade	Steve Norrington	Wesley Snipes, Stephen Dorff, Kris Kristofferson	United States	
Blood, Guts, Bullets and Octane	Joe Carnahan	Dan Leis, Joe Carnahan, Dan Harlan	United States	Action comedy
Buhawi Jack	Philip Ko; Teddy Gomez	Monsour del Rosario, Chuck Perez, Carmina Villarroel, Niño Muhlach, Ara Mina	Philippines	
Code Name: Bomba	Efren C. Piñon	Monsour del Rosario, Ara Mina, Chuck Perez, Bernard Bonnin, Ruel Vernal	Philippines	
Desperate Measures	Barbet Schroeder	Michael Keaton, Andy García, Brian Cox	United States	
Enemy of the State	Tony Scott	Will Smith, Gene Hackman, Jon Voight	United States	
Enter the Eagles	Corey Yuen	Shannon Lee, Michael Wong, Jordan Chan, Anita Yuen, Benny Urquidez	Hong Kong	
Hard Rain	Mikael Salomon	Christian Slater, Morgan Freeman, Minnie Driver	United States	
A Hero Never Dies	Johnnie To	Leon Lai, Lau Ching-Wan, Fiona Leung	Hong Kong	
Hitman	Stephen Tung	Jet Li, Eric Tsang, Simon Yam	Hong Kong	
Kahit Pader, Gigibain Ko	Joey del Rosario	Phillip Salvador, Rosanna Roces, Eddie Gutierrez, Elizabeth Oropesa, Richard Bonnin	Philippines	
Kaskasero	Tata Esteban	Tonton Gutierrez, Anjanette Abayari, Adonis Laxamana, Lovely Rivero, Teresa Loyzaga	Philippines	
Knock Off	Tsui Hark	Jean-Claude Van Damme, Rob Schneider, Lela Rochon	United States; Hong Kong	
Laban Ko Ito... Walang Dapat Madamay	Toto Natividad	Jestoni Alarcon, Alma Concepcion, Tirso Cruz III, Dencio Padilla, Rez Cortez	Philippines	
Lethal Weapon 4	Richard Donner	Mel Gibson, Danny Glover, Joe Pesci	United States	
The Mask of Zorro	Martin Campbell	Antonio Banderas, Anthony Hopkins, Catherine Zeta-Jones	United States	Swashbuckler
Mercury Rising	Harold Becker	Bruce Willis, Alec Baldwin, Miko Hughes	United States	
Padre Kalibre	Val Iglesias	Eddie Garcia, Monsour del Rosario, Eddie Gutierrez, Dan Fernandez, Aya Medel	Philippines	
Pagbabalik ng Probinsyano	Ronwaldo Reyes	Fernando Poe Jr., Anjanette Abayari, Daniel Fernando, Lovely Rivero, Subas Herrero	Philippines	
Point Blank	Matt Earl Beesley	Mickey Rourke, Paul Ben-Victor, Danny Trejo	United States	
Portland Street Blues	Raymond Yip Wai Man	Sandra Ng, Kristy Yeung, Alex Fong Chung-sun	Hong Kong	
Razor Blade Smile	Jake West	Eileen Daly, Christopher Adamson, Heidi James	United Kingdom	Action horror
The Replacement Killers	Antoine Fuqua	Chow Yun-fat, Mira Sorvino	United States	
Ronin	John Frankenheimer	Robert De Niro, Jean Reno, Natascha McElhone	United States	
Rush Hour	Brett Ratner	Chris Tucker, Jackie Chan, Tom Wilkinson	United States	
Sambahin ang Ngalan Mo	Jose N. Carreon	Eddie Garcia, Christopher de Leon, Jomari Yllana, Alice Dixson, Efren Reyes	Philippines	
Shark Skin Man and Peach Hip Girl	Katsuhito Ishii	Tadanobu Asano, Sie Kohinata, Ittoku Kishibe	Japan	
The Siege	Edward Zwick	Denzel Washington, Annette Bening, Bruce Willis	United States	
Small Soldiers	Joe Dante	Frank Langella, Tommy Lee Jones, Ernest Borgnine	United States	Science fiction
Soldier	Paul W. S. Anderson	Kurt Russell, Jason Isaacs, Gary Busey	United States	
Sonny Segovia: Lumakad Ka sa Apoy	Jose N. Carreon	Mark Anthony Fernandez, Giselle Toengi, Alma Moreno, Dan Fernandez, Roy Alvarez	Philippines	
The Storm Riders	Andrew Lau	Aaron Kwok, Ekin Cheng, Sonny Chiba	Hong Kong	Martial arts film
Strebel, Gestapo ng Maynila	Ricardo 'Bebong' Osorio	Jinggoy Estrada, Amanda Page, Beth Tamayo, Dante Rivero, Bob Soler	Philippines	
The Substitute 2: School's Out	Steve Pearl	Treat Williams, B.D. Wong, Lawrence Gilliard, Jr.	United States	
Taxi	Gérard Pirès	Samy Naceri, Frederic Diefenthal, Marion Cotillard	France	Action comedy
U.S. Marshals	Stuart Baird	Tommy Lee Jones, Wesley Snipes, Robert Downey Jr.	United States	
Vampires	John Carpenter	James Woods, Daniel Baldwin, Sheryl Lee	United States	Action thriller
Warfreak	Cesar Montano; Toto Natividad	Cesar Montano, Ace Espinosa, Susan Jane Ritter, Mickey Ferriols, Jess Lapid Jr.	Philippines	
Who Am I?	Jackie Chan, Benny Chan	Jackie Chan, Michelle Ferre, Mirai Yamamoto	Hong Kong	
Young and Dangerous 5	Andrew Lau	Ekin Cheng, Paul Chiang	Hong Kong	
1999
Alyas Pogi: Ang Pagbabalik	Joey del Rosario	Ramon "Bong" Revilla Jr., Ara Mina, Tonton Gutierrez, Jeffrey Santos, Efren Reyes	Philippines	Biographical action
Anino	Teddy Gomez	Roi Vinzon, John Regala, Sandra Gomez, Melissa Mendez, Maita Soriano	Philippines	
The Base	Mark L. Lester	Mark Dacascos, Paula Trickey	United States	
Bayolente	Baldo Marro	Zoren Legaspi, Aila Marie, Melissa Mendez, Ruel Vernal, Orestes Ojeda	Philippines	
Blue Streak	Les Mayfield	Martin Lawrence, Luke Wilson, Peter Greene	United States	Action comedy
The Boondock Saints	Troy Duffy	Willem Dafoe, Sean Patrick Flanery, Norman Reedus	United States	Action thriller
Bullet	Cesar Montano	Cesar Montano, Sunshine Cruz, Jay Manalo	Philippines	Action thriller
Bullets Over Summer	Wilson Yip	Francis Ng, David Lee, Joe Lee	Hong Kong	Action thriller
Century of the Dragon	Clarence Fok	Andy Lau, Lee Siu-kei, Louis Koo	Hong Kong	
Chill Factor	Hugh Johnson	Cuba Gooding Jr., Skeet Ulrich, Peter Firth	United States	Action thriller
The Corruptor	James Foley	Chow Yun-fat, Mark Wahlberg, Ric Young	United States	Action thriller
Dead or Alive	Takashi Miike	Riki Takeuchi, Show Aikawa, Renji Ishibashi	Japan	
End of Days	Peter Hyams	Arnold Schwarzenegger, Gabriel Byrne, Robin Tunney	United States	
Gatilyo: Sa Bawat Kalabit Buhay ang Kapalit	Tata Esteban	John Regala, Chuck Perez, Julio Diaz, Giorgia Ortega, Gerald Madrid	Philippines	
Gen-X Cops	Benny Chan	Toru Nakamura, Eric Tsang, Daniel Wu	Hong Kong	
Gorgeous	Vincent Kok	Jackie Chan, Shu Qi, Tony Leung Chiu-Wai	Hong Kong	Martial arts film
Kanang Kamay: Ituro Mo...Itutumba Ko	Jose N. Carreon	Monsour del Rosario, Aileen Damiles, Ramon Christopher, Emilio Garcia, Levi Ignacio	Philippines	
Kapag Kumulo ang Dugo	Leonardo L. Garcia	Jeric Raval, Daisy Reyes, Kier Legaspi, Roy Alvarez, Bing Davao	Philippines	
Isusumbong Kita sa Tatay Ko...	Boots Plata	Fernando Poe Jr., Judy Ann Santos, Aileen Damiles, Anita Linda, Paquito Diaz	Philippines	Action comedy
Lalaban Ako, Hanggang sa Huling Hininga	Teddy Gomez; Jimmy Ko	Monsour del Rosario, Carmina Villarroel, Matt Ranillo, Mike Gayoso, Froilan Sales	Philippines	
The Legend of Speed	Andrew Lau	Ekin Cheng, Simon Yam	Hong Kong	
A Man Called Hero	Andrew Lau	Ekin Cheng, Shu Qi, Kristy Yang	Hong Kong	
Markado	Efren C. Piñon	Zoren Legaspi, Edu Manzano, Ina Raymundo, Niño Muhlach, Richard Bonnin	Philippines	
The Matrix	Andy Wachowski, Larry Wachowski	Keanu Reeves, Laurence Fishburne, Carrie-Anne Moss	United States	Science fiction action
The Mod Squad	Scott Silver	Claire Danes, Giovanni Ribisi, Omar Epps	United States	
Mystery Men	Kinka Usher	Ben Stiller, Hank Azaria, William H. Macy	United States	Action comedy
Nikilado	Leonardo L. Garcia	Jeric Raval, Aya Medel, Chuck Perez, Brando Legaspi, Dindo Arroyo	Philippines	
Nowhere to Hide	Lee Myung-se	Ahn Sung-ki, Park Joong-hoon, Jang Dong-gun	South Korea	
Payback	Brian Helgeland	Mel Gibson, Gregg Henry, Maria Bello	United States	Action thriller
Pepeng Agimat	Felix E. Dalay	Ramon "Bong" Revilla Jr., Vanessa del Bianco, Dennis Padilla, Princess Punzalan, Jess Lapid	Philippines	Action fantasy, horror
Purple Storm	Teddy Chan	Daniel Wu, Kwok-Leung Gan, Emil Chau	Hong Kong	
Running Out of Time	Johnnie To	Andy Lau, Lau Ching-Wan, Yo Yo Mung	Hong Kong	Action thriller
Shiri	Jacky Kang	Han Suk-kyu, Choi Min-sik, Song Kang-ho	South Korea	
Simon Sez	Kevin Elders	Dennis Rodman, Dane Cook, Natalia Cigliuti	United States	
Star Wars Episode I: The Phantom Menace	George Lucas	Liam Neeson, Ewan McGregor, Natalie Portman	United States	
Universal Soldier: The Return	Mic Rodgers	Jean-Claude Van Damme, Michael Jai White, Heidi Schanz	United States	
Tigasin	Ike Jarlego Jr.	Eddie Garcia, Victor Neri, Alma Concepcion, Alvin Anson, Peque Gallaga	Philippines	Action comedy
Victim	Ringo Lam	Lau Ching-Wan, Amy Kwok, Tony Leung Kar-Fai	Hong Kong	Action thriller
Wing Commander	Chris Roberts	Saffron Burrows, Freddie Prinze Jr., Matthew Lillard	United States; Luxembourg	Science fiction action
The World Is Not Enough	Michael Apted	Pierce Brosnan, Sophie Marceau, Robert Carlyle	United States; United Kingdom	
Zero Tolerance	Anders Nilsson	Jakob Eklund, Marie Richardson	Sweden	Action thriller

== See also ==
- Action films
- Martial arts films
- Swashbuckler films
