= List of films produced and released by GMA Pictures =

This is the list of feature-length theatrical films produced and released by the Filipino motion picture company GMA Pictures since its foundation in 1994.

== 1990s ==
=== 1994 ===
Title	Release date	Director	Cast	Associated film production
Ober da Bakod: The Movie	June 22	Ariel Ureta	Janno Gibbs, Anjo Yllana, Gelli de Belen, Donita Rose	Viva Films
Sana Dalawa ang Puso Ko	July 27	Mac Alejandre	Dina Bonnevie, Rustom Padilla, Alice Dixson	Viva Films
Forever	September 28	Rowell Santiago	Aga Muhlach, Mikee Cojuangco	Viva Films

=== 1995 ===
Title	Release date	Director	Cast	Associated film production
Bagong Bayani	June	Amable Aguiluz	Helen Gamboa, Dennis Marasigan	
Run Barbi Run	July 19	Tony Y. Reyes	Joey De Leon, Maricel Laxa, The Eraserheads	Moviestars Production

=== 1996 ===
Title	Release date	Director	Cast	Associated film production
Ober da Bakod 2 (Da Treasure Adbentyur)	January 25	Ariel Ureta	Janno Gibbs, Anjo Yllana, Gelli de Belen, Manilyn Reynes	Neo Films
Tubusin Mo ng Bala ang Puso Ko	March 14	Toto Natividad	Edu Manzano, Anjanette Abayari, Mark Gil, Bembol Roco, Ronaldo Valdez	OctoArts Films
Leon Cordero: Duwag Lang ang Hahalik sa Lupa	June 12	Baldo Marro	Raymart Santiago, Jennifer Mendoza, Lailani Navarro	OctoArts Films
Ben Balasador: Akin ang Huling Alas	August 21	Pepe Marcos	Ian Veneracion, Beth Tamayo, Mark Gil, Bing Davao, Charlie Davao	OctoArts Films
Lab en Kisses	September 11	Tony Y. Reyes	Vic Sotto, Vina Morales	M-Zet Productions, OctoArts Films
'Wag Na 'Wag Kang Lalayo	October 2	Jose Carreon	Rudy Fernandez, Vina Morales, Efren Reyes Jr.	OctoArts Films
Totoy Hitman: Batas Ko ang Hahatol	December 2	Pepe Marcos	Ian Veneracion, Edu Manzano, E.R. Ejercito	OctoArts Films
Rubberman	December 25	Edgardo Vinarao	Michael V., Beth Tamayo, Gloria Romero, Dick Israel, Allan K.	OctoArts Films

=== 1997 ===
Title	Release date	Director	Cast	Associated film production
Bitoy Ang Itawag Mo Sa Akin	January 8	Edgardo Vinarao	Michael V., Jennifer Mendoza, Arnel Ignacio	OctoArts Films
Bastardo	May 7	Pepe Marcos	Ian Veneracion, Ina Raymundo, Raymond Bagatsing, Mark Gil	OctoArts Films
Ayos Lang, Pare Ko	May 28	Bebong Osorio	Rudy Fernandez, Gelli de Belen, Ogie Alcasid	Megavision Films
Halik ng Vampira	June 11	Peque Gallaga; Lore Reyes	Anjanette Abayari, Raymond Bagatsing, Beth Tamayo, Michael V., Jaime Fabregas	OctoArts Films
Kamandag Ko ang Papatay Sayo	August 6	Pepe Marcos	Ronnie Ricketts, Beth Tamayo, Eddie Gutierrez	OctoArts Films
Frame Up: Ihahatid Kita sa Hukay	October 1	Pepe Marcos	Raymart Santiago, Jessa Zaragoza	OctoArts Films
Mapusok	November 5	Mel Chionglo	Rosanna Roces, Julio Diaz, Emilio Garcia	OctoArts Films
Sanggano	December 3	Toto Natividad	Cesar Montano, Judy Ann Santos, John Estrada	Megavision Films

=== 1998 ===
Title	Release date	Director	Writer	Cast	Associated film production
Anting-anting	January 14	Ipe Pelino	Screenplay: Cris Pablo; Story: Ipe Pelino, Michael V., Cris Pablo	Michael V., Jessa Zaragoza, Edu Manzano	OctoArts Films
Guevarra (Sa Batas Ko... Walang Hari)	January 28	Pepe Marcos, Manuel "Fyke" Cinco	Screenplay: Henry Nadong; Story & Idea: Pepe Marcos	Ian Veneracion, Ricardo Cepeda, Rez Cortez, Lara Morena, Ynez Veneracion	OctoArts Films
Sa Pusod ng Dagat	February	Marilou Diaz-Abaya	Jun Lana	Jomari Yllana, Elizabeth Oropesa, Pen Medina, Chin-Chin Gutierrez	Film Experts
My Guardian Debil	March 25	Jun Urbano	Jun Urbano	Jimmy Santos, Ronnie Ricketts, Chin Chin Gutierrez	Film Experts
Sinaktan Mo ang Puso Ko	April 29	Tony Y. Reyes	Screenplay: Cris Pablo; Story: Michael V., Tony Y. Reyes, Cris Pablo	Michael V., Beth Tamayo, Lara Morena	OctoArts Films
José Rizal	June 12	Marilou Diaz-Abaya	Ricky Lee, Jun Lana, Peter Ong Lim	Cesar Montano	
May Sayad	June 17	Ronn Rick	Screenplay: Manny Buising, Ronn Rick, Joey Chua; Story: Carlos C.P. Agustin, Ronn Rick	Ronnie Ricketts, Jennifer Mendoza, Tonton Gutierrez, Ogie Alcasid	OctoArts Films
Marahas: Walang Kilalang Batas	August 12	Francis 'Jun' Posadas	Henry Nadong	Raymart Santiago, Raymond Bagatsing, Beth Tamayo	OctoArts Films
Armadong Hudas	November 4	Augusto Salvador	Jose Carreon, Eric Francisco	Ian Veneracion, Tonton Gutierrez, Jessa Zaragosa, Ronaldo Valdez	OctoArts Films

=== 1999 ===
Title	Release date	Director	Writer	Cast	Associated film production
D' Sisters (Nuns of the Above)	January 4	Tony Y. Reyes	Cris Pablo, Elly Matawaran, Tony Y. Reyes	Vic Sotto, Michael V., Beth Tamayo, Lindsay Custodio	OctoArts Films, M-Zet Films
Bakit Pa?	February 3	Jose Javier Reyes	Jose Javier Reyes	Jessa Zaragoza, Troy Montero, Diether Ocampo	Available Light, OctoArts Films
Malikot Na Mundo	1999	Mel Chionglo	Ricky Lee	Raymond Bagatsing, Jessa Zaragoza, Lara Morena	OctoArts Films
The Liberation: Voltes V the Movie	June 9	N/A	Earl Palma	Earl Palma	TeleSuccess Productions, RoadRunner Network
Saranggola	June 19	Gil Portes	Jose Y. Dalisay Jr., Gil M. Portes	Ricky Davao, Lester Llansang, Jennifer Sevilla	Teamwork Productions
Muro-Ami	December 25	Marilou Diaz-Abaya	Ricardo Lee, Jun Lana	Cesar Montano, Amy Austria, Pen Medina, Jhong Hilario	

== 2000s ==
=== 2000 ===
Title	Release date	Director	Writer	Cast	Associated film production
The Debut	May 18	Gene Cajayon	Gene Cajayon, John Manal Castro	Danté Basco, Tirso Cruz III, Eddie Garcia	5 Card Productions, Celestial Pictures, National Asian American Telecommunications Association, Visual Communications
Deathrow	December 25	Joel Lamangan	Screenplay: Ricardo Lee, Manny Palo; Story: Ricardo Lee, Butch Jimenez, Joel Lamangan	Eddie Garcia, Cogie Domingo, Angelika dela Cruz	

=== 2005 ===
Title	Release date	Director	Writer	Cast	Associated film production
Kilig... Pintig... Yanig	January 31	Mark A. Reyes, Carlos Siguion-Reyna, Rahyan Carlos	Kit Villanueva-Langit, Bibeth Orteza, Rahyan Carlos	Chynna Ortaleza, Nadine Samonte, Jake Cuenca, Julianne Lee, Dion Ignacio, Katrina Halili, Tyron Perez	GMA Artist Center
Let the Love Begin	February 9	Mac C. Alejandre	Robert Joseph Nuevas, Suzette Doctolero	Richard Gutierrez, Angel Locsin, Jennylyn Mercado, Mark Herras	
La Funeraria Toti		Rahyan Carlos	Rahyan Carlos	Arpee Bautista, Marc Laurenze Celis, Eric dela Cruz	GMA Artist Center
Lovestruck	September 14	Louie Lagdameo Ignacio	Screenplay: Suzette Doctolero; Story: Annette Gozon-Abrogar	Jolina Magdangal, Jennylyn Mercado, Mark Herras	
Mulawin: The Movie	December 25	Dominic Zapata	Don Michael Perez	Richard Gutierrez, Angel Locsin	Regal Entertainment

=== 2006 ===
Title	Release date	Director	Writer	Cast	Associated film production
I Will Always Love You	February 8	Mac C. Alejandre	Screenplay: Robert Joseph Nuevas, Suzette Doctolero; Story: Roselle Monteverde-Teo, Robert Joseph Nuevas, Suzette Doctolero	Angel Locsin, Richard Gutierrez	Regal Entertainment
Moments of Love	March 29	Mark A. Reyes	Screenplay: Gina Marissa Tagasa; Story: Annette Gozon-Abrogar	Dingdong Dantes, Iza Calzado, Karylle, Gloria Romero	
Till I Met You	October 11	Mark A. Reyes	Screenplay: Benedict Mique; Story: Annette Gozon-Abrogar	Robin Padilla, Regine Velasquez, Eddie Garcia	Viva Films

=== 2007 ===
Title	Release date	Director	Writer	Cast	Associated film production
The Promise	February 14	Michael Tuviera	Raquel N. Villavicencio	Richard Gutierrez, Angel Locsin, Rhian Ramos, TJ Trinidad	Regal Entertainment
Ouija	July 25	Topel Lee	Aloy Adlawan	Judy Ann Santos, Jolina Magdangal, Iza Calzado, Rhian Ramos	Viva Films
Batanes: Sa Dulo ng Walang Hanggan	December 5	Adolfo Alix Jr., Dave Hukom	Arah Jell Badayos	Iza Calzado, Ken Chu	Ignite Media

=== 2008 ===
Title	Release date	Director	Writer	Cast	Associated film production
My Bestfriend's Girlfriend	February 13	Mark A. Reyes V	Suzette Doctolero	Richard Gutierrez, Marian Rivera	Regal Entertainment
Daybreak (Note: As distributor only)	February 20	Adolfo B. Alix Jr.	Charliebebs S. Gohetia	Coco Martin, Paolo Rivero	Bicycle Pictures
Ploning	April 30	Dante Nico Garcia	Bj Lingan, Dante Nico Garcia	Judy Ann Santos	Panoramanila Pictures
My Monster Mom	July 2	Jose Javier Reyes	Jose Javier Reyes	Ruffa Gutierrez, Annabelle Rama	Regal Entertainment
I.T.A.L.Y. (I Trust and Love You)	September 17	Mark A. Reyes	Senedy Que	Jolina Magdangal, Rufa Mae Quinto, Dennis Trillo, Eugene Domingo, Rhian Ramos, Mark Herras	
One True Love	November 19	Mac C. Alejandre	Irma Dimaranan, Annette Gozon-Abrogar	Dingdong Dantes, Marian Rivera, Iza Calzado	Regal Entertainment

=== 2009 ===
Title	Release date	Director	Writer	Cast	Associated film production
And It All Began... When I Met U	February 11	Joel C. Lamangan	Aloy Adlawan	Richard Gutierrez, KC Concepcion	Regal Entertainment
Sundo	March 18	Topel Lee	Aloy Adlawan	Robin Padilla, Sunshine Dizon, Katrina Halili, Rhian Ramos, Iza Calzado	
Yaya & Angelina: The Spoiled Brat Movie	September 23	Michael Tuviera	Screenplay: Michael V., Ramon Roco, Chito Francisco, Cesar Cosme; Story: Michael V.	Michael V., Ogie Alcasid, Jomari Yllana, Aiko Melendez, Iza Calzado	APT Entertainment
Patient X	October 28	Yam Laranas	Screenplay: Aloy Adlawan & Yam Laranas; Story: Yam Laranas	Richard Gutierrez, Cristine Reyes	Viva Films; RGUTZ Productions
Ang Panday	December 25	Mac Alejandre	Screenplay: RJ Nuevas; Story: Carlo J. Caparas, RJ Nuevas	Ramon "Bong" Revilla, Jr., Phillip Salvador, Robert Villar, Rhian Ramos, Iza Calzado, Geoff Eigenmann	Imus Productions

== 2010s ==
=== 2010 ===
Title	Release date	Director	Writer	Cast	Associated film production
Working Girls	April 21	Jose Javier Reyes	Jose Javier Reyes	Eugene Domingo, Ruffa Gutierrez, Iza Calzado, Eula Valdez, Jennylyn Mercado, Cristine Reyes, Bianca King	Viva Films; Unitel Pictures
You to Me Are Everything	May 5	Mark A. Reyes V	Aloy Adlawan	Dingdong Dantes, Marian Rivera	Regal Entertainment
In Your Eyes	August 18	Mac C. Alejandre	Keiko A. Aquino	Claudine Barretto, Anne Curtis, Richard Gutierrez	Viva Films
Si Agimat at si Enteng Kabisote	December 25	Tony Y. Reyes	Bibeth Orteza, RJ Nuevas	Bong Revilla, Vic Sotto, Jillian Ward, Sam Pinto, Gwen Zamora	OctoArts Films, M-Zet TV Productions, APT Entertainment, Imus Productions

=== 2011 ===
Title	Release date	Director	Writer	Cast	Associated film production
My Valentine Girls	February 9	Andoy Ranay, Chris Martinez, Dominic Zapata	Aloy Adlawan, Rona Lean Sales; Screenplay ("Gunaw"): Chris Martinez; Concept ("Gunaw"): Chris Martinez, Marlon Rivera	Richard Gutierrez, Jillian Ward, Eugene Domingo, Solenn Heussaff, Lovi Poe, Rhian Ramos	Regal Entertainment
Joey Gosiengfiao's Temptation Island	July 6	Chris Martinez	Chris Martinez; Original Story: Toto Belano	Marian Rivera, Heart Evangelista, Lovi Poe, Rufa Mae Quinto, Solenn Heussaff	Regal Entertainment
Tween Academy: Class of 2012	August 24	Mark A. Reyes V	Kit Villanueva Langit	Joshua Dionisio, Barbie Forteza, Jake Vargas, Bea Binene, Elmo Magalona, Louise delos Reyes, Alden Richards	SMDC
Babangluksa	November 2	Yuan Santiago	Yuan Santiago	Precious Lara Quigaman, Angelika Dela Cruz, Luis Alandy	
The Road	November 30	Yam Laranas	Aloy Adlawan, Yam Laranas	Carmina Villarroel, Marvin Agustin, Rhian Ramos, TJ Trinidad, Barbie Forteza, Alden Richards, Louise delos Reyes, Derrick Monasterio, Lexi Fernandez, Ynna Asistio, Renz Valerio	
Ang Panday 2	December 25	Mac C. Alejandre	Screenplay: RJ Nuevas; Story: Carlo J. Caparas, RJ Nuevas	Bong Revilla, Marian Rivera, Phillip Salvador	Imus Productions

=== 2012 ===
Title	Release date	Director	Writer	Cast	Associated film production
My Kontrabida Girl	March 14	Jade Castro	Jade Francis Castro, Aloy Adlawan	Rhian Ramos, Aljur Abrenica, Bea Binene, Jake Vargas	
The Witness	March 21	Muhammad Yusuf	Bebi Hasibuan	Gwen Zamora, Pierre Gruno	Skylar Pictures
Boy Pick-Up: The Movie	June 6	Dominic Zapata	Screenplay: Aloy Adlawan; Story: Ogie Alcasid, Aloy Adlawan	Ogie Alcasid, Dennis Trillo, Solenn Heussaff	Regal Entertainment
Just One Summer	August 15	Mac Alejandre	Screenplay: Onay Sales; Story: Emman Dela Cruz, Kei Fausto	Julie Anne San Jose, Elmo Magalona	
Of All the Things	September 26	Joyce Bernal	Mel Mendoza-Del Rosario	Regine Velasquez, Aga Muhlach	Viva Films
Tiktik: The Aswang Chronicles	October 17	Erik Matti	Screenplay: Erik Matti; Story & Concept: Erik Matti, Ronald "Dondon" Monteverde	Dingdong Dantes, Lovi Poe, Joey Marquez, Janice de Belen, Ramon Bautista	Reality Entertainment, AgostoDos Pictures, Mothership Inc., PostManila Productions
Sosy Problems: It Girls Just Wanna Have Fun	December 25	Andoy Ranay	Des Severino	Heart Evangelista, Bianca King, Rhian Ramos, Solenn Heussaff, Aljur Abrenica, Mikael Daez, Benjamin Alves, Ruffa Gutierrez	
Si Agimat, si Enteng Kabisote at si Ako	December 25	Tony Y. Reyes	Screenplay: Bibeth Orteza; Story: Antonio P. Tuviera, Antonio Y. Reyes,	Bong Revilla, Vic Sotto, Judy Ann Santos	OctoArts Films, Imus Productions, M-Zet Productions, APT Entertainment

=== 2013 ===
Title	Release date	Director	Writer	Cast	Associated film production
Dance of the Steel Bars	May 22	Cesar Apolinario, Marnie P. Manicad	Screenplay: Cris Lim; Story: Cesar Apolinario, Marnie Manicad, Jiggy Manicad	Dingdong Dantes, Patrick Bergin, Ricky Davao	Portfolio Films
My Lady Boss	July 3	Jade Castro	Screenplay: Aloy Adlawan; Story: Annette Gozon-Abrogar	Richard Gutierrez, Marian Rivera	Regal Entertainment
San Lazaro (Note: Online release)	July 22	Wincy Aquino Ong	Wincy Aquino Ong & Ramon Bautista	Ramon Bautista, Wincy Aquino Ong, Nicco Manalo	Watusi Productions, Ramon Bautista Films
Sana Dati	September 25	Jerrold Tarog	Screenplay: Ramon Ukit; Story Consultant: Ruel Dahis Antipuesto	Paulo Avelino, Lovi Poe, TJ Trinidad, Benjamin Alves	Metric Films

=== 2014 ===
Title	Release date	Director	Writer	Cast	Associated film production
Basement	February 12	Topel Lee	Screenplay: Rona Lean Sales, Hector Macaso; Story & Concept: Topel Lee, Rona Lean Sales, Emmanuel Dela Cruz	Ellen Adarna, Enzo Pineda, Sarah Lahbati, Pilita Corrales, Louise delos Reyes, Kristofer Martin, Teejay Marquez, Jan Manual, Chynna Ortaleza, RJ Padilla	Springbooard Film Productions, Coffee House Productions
Overtime	July 2	Wincy Aquino Ong & Earl Ignacio	Wincy Aquino Ong	Richard Gutierrez, Lauren Young	
Kubot: The Aswang Chronicles 2	December 25	Erik Matti	Screenplay: Michiko Yamamoto; Story: Erik Matti, Michiko Yamamoto	Dingdong Dantes, Isabelle Daza, Joey Marquez, Lotlot de Leon, Julie Anne San Jose, Abra	AgostoDos Pictures, Reality Entertainment

=== 2015 ===
Title	Release date	Director	Writer	Cast	Associated film production
Blood in Dispute	August 9, 2015 (Cambodia); April 17, 2016 (Philippines)	Ken Simpson	Ken Simpson, Romilly Belcourt	Andrea Torres, Mikael Daez, Meas Thorn Srenai, Khat Vaihang, and Tep Rindaro	Phum Pich Films, GMA Network and Cambodian Television Network.
My Bebe Love: #KiligPaMore	December 25	Jose Javier Reyes	Screenplay: Jose Javier Reyes; Story: Bibeth Orteza, Jose Javier Reyes	Vic Sotto, Aiai Delas Alas, Alden Richards, Maine Mendoza	OctoArts Films, M-Zet TV Productions, APT Entertainment, MEDA Productions

=== 2016 ===
Title	Release date	Director	Writer	Cast	Associated film production
Imagine You & Me	July 13	Michael Tuviera	Renato Custodio Jr., Aloy Adlawan	Alden Richards, Maine Mendoza	APT Entertainment, M-Zet TV Productions

=== 2019 ===
Title	Release date	Director	Writer	Cast	Associated film production	Ref.
Family History	July 24	Michael V.	Michael V.	Michael V., Dawn Zulueta, Bianca Umali, Miguel Tanfelix, Paolo Contis, Ina Feleo, Kakai Bautista, Nikki Co, Mikoy Morales and Nonie Buencamino	Mic Test Entertainment	
Children of the River	August 3	Maricel Cabrera-Cariaga	Maricel Cabrera-Cariaga	Noel Comia Jr., Junyka Santarin, Dave Justine Francis and Ricky Oriarte	Luna Studios; Spears Films; Cinemalaya Foundation	
Kiko en Lala	September 25	Adolfo B. Alix Jr.	Screenplay: Jerome Zamora & Jessie Villa Brille; Story: Jerome Zamora	Super Tekla, Kim Domingo, Derrick Monasterio, Divine Tetay, Kiray Celis and Jo Berry	Backyard Production	

== 2020s ==
=== 2023 ===
Title	Release date	Director	Cast	Associated film production	Ref.
Voltes V: Legacy – The Cinematic Experience	April 19	Mark A. Reyes	Miguel Tanfelix, Radson Flores, Matt Lozano, Raphael Landicho, Ysabel Ortega	Telesuccess Productions	
The Cheating Game	July 26	Rod Marmol	Julie Anne San Jose, Rayver Cruz	GMA Public Affairs	
The Missing	August 25	Carl Joseph Papa	Carlo Aquino, Dolly de Leon	Project 8 GMA Public Affairs; Terminal Six Post	
Video City	September 20	Raynier Brizuela	Ruru Madrid, Yassi Pressman	Viva Films; Studio Viva	
Five Breakups and a Romance	October 18	Irene Emma Villamor	Alden Richards, Julia Montes	Cornerstone Studios; Myriad Entertainment	
Firefly	December 25	Zig Dulay	Alessandra De Rossi, Euwenn Aleta, Max Collins, Miguel Tanfelix, Ysabel Ortega	GMA Public Affairs Distributed by VIVA Films International (United Arab Emirates) Amazon Prime Video (Video-on-Demand)	

=== 2024 ===
Title	Release date	Director	Cast	Associated film production	Ref.
Pasional	February 14	Miguel Faustmann	Andrea Torres, Marcelo Melingo	Stage Craft International Inc; Maxi One Signature Film; Malevo Films	
Playtime	June 12	Mark Reyes	Sanya Lopez, Coleen Garcia, Faye Lorenzo, Xian Lim	Viva Films	
Balota	August 3	Kip Oebanda	Marian Rivera, Will Ashley, Gardo Versoza	GMA Entertainment Group; Film Development Council of the Philippines	
Alipato at Muog	August 3	JL Burgos		Pulang Langgam; GMA Public Affairs	
Lost Sabungeros	November 9	Bryan Kristoffer Brazil		GMA Public Affairs	
Hello, Love, Again	November 13	Cathy Garcia-Sampana	Kathryn Bernardo, Alden Richards	ABS-CBN Studios; Star Cinema	
Green Bones	December 25	Zig Dulay	Dennis Trillo, Ruru Madrid	GMA Public Affairs; Brightburn Entertainment Distributed by Columbia Pictures Philippines for Sony Pictures Releasing International	

=== 2025 ===
Title	Release date	Director	Cast	Associated film production	Ref.
Everything About My Wife	February 26	Real S. Florido	Jennylyn Mercado, Sam Milby, Dennis Trillo	CreaZion Studios; Glimmer Studios	
Olsen's Day	March 14	JP Habac	Khalil Ramos, Romnick Sarmenta, Xander Numa	Puregold, CMB Films	
Samahan ng mga Makasalanan	April 19	Benedict Mique	Sanya Lopez, David Licauco, Joel Torre	Lonewolf Films	
P77	July 30	Derick Cabrido	Barbie Forteza, Euwenn Mikaell, JC Alcantara	GMA Public Affairs; Clever Minds Inc. Distributed by Warner Bros. Pictures	
KMJS' Gabi ng Lagim: The Movie	November 26	King Mark Baco, Yam Laranas, Dodo Dayao	Jillian Ward, Sanya Lopez, Elijah Canlas, Miguel Tanfelix	GMA Public Affairs Distributed by Columbia Pictures Philippines for Sony Pictures Releasing International	
Love You So Bad	December 25	Mae Cruz-Alviar	Will Ashley, Bianca de Vera, Dustin Yu	ABS-CBN Studios, Star Cinema, Regal Entertainment	

=== 2026 ===
Title	Release date	Director	Cast	Associated film production	Ref.
58th	January 31	Carl Joseph Papa	Glaiza De Castro, Ricky Davao, Mikoy Morales, Biboy Ramirez, Marco Masa, Zyren Dela Cruz.	GMA Public Affairs	
Huwag Kang Titingin	April 15	Frasco Mortiz	Sofia Pablo, Allen Ansay, Marco Masa, Kira Balinger, Michael Sager	Mentorque Productions	
Red Crown	October 28	Andoy Ranay	Shuvee Etrata, Michelle Dee, Faith da Silva and Bianca Manalo	Chavit Singson Production	
Ella Arcangel: Awit ng Pangil at Kuko	November 13	Mervin Malonzo	Bianca Umali, Michael V.	Twenty Manila, Rocketsheep Studio	

== Upcoming films ==
Dated
Title	Release date	Director	Cast	Associated film production	Ref.
Ella Arcangel: Awit ng Pangil at Kuko	November 13, 2026	Mervin Malonzo	Bianca Umali, Michael V.	Twenty Manila, Rocketsheep Studio	
Amir	December 25, 2026	Zig Dulay	Dennis Trillo, Argus Aspiras, Glaiza De Castro, Will Ashley, Toto Saracho	GMA Public Affairs, Bright Burn Entertainment Distributed by Sony Pictures Releasing International	

Undated
Title	Release date	Director	Cast	Associated film production	Ref.
Version Two	TBA	Irene Villamor	Anne Curtis, Alden Richards	Viva Films, GMA Public Affairs, Ojales-Curtis Productions, Myriad Studios	
Disband	TBA	Irene Villamor	Enrique Gil, Ruru Madrid, Kylie Padilla, Buboy Villar, Derrick Monasterio	GMA Public Affairs	
Ang Panday, ang Agimat at Alyas Pogi	TBA	Rico Gutierrez	Ramon "Bong" Revilla Jr	Imus Productions, GMA Entertainment Group	
Moments of Love: On Borrowed Time	TBA	Mark Reyes	TBA	GMA Entertainment Group, GMA Public Affairs	
TBA	TBA	Irene Villamor	Bianca Umali, Piolo Pascual	GMA Public Affairs	
TBA	TBA	Irene Villamor	Bea Alonzo, John Lloyd Cruz	ABS-CBN Studios, Star Cinema	
TBA	TBA	Zig Dulay	Alden Richards, Jodi Sta. Maria	GMA Entertainment Group; PDD; Myriad Studios	
TBA	TBA	Jun Lana	Dingdong Dantes, Alden Richards	GMA Entertainment Group, Chavit Singson Productions, Agosto Dos Pictures, Myriad Studios	
TBA	TBA	Yam Laranas	Barbie Forteza, David Licauco	GMA Public Affairs	
TBA	TBA	Zig Dulay	Anne Curtis, Jennylyn Mercado	Viva Films, GMA Entertainment Group, Ojales-Curtis Productions	
TBA	TBA	Enrique Gil	Enrique Gil, Alden Richards	GMA Entertainment Group, Anima Studios, Myriad Studios	
TBA	TBA	Irene Villamor	Bea Alonzo	Produced by GMA Public Affairs; Distributed only by GMA Pictures	
TBA	TBA	TBA	Nadine Lustre	Produced by GMA Public Affairs, GMA Entertainment Group, Distributed by GMA Pictures	
TBA	TBA	TBA	Sarah Geronimo and John Lloyd Cruz	Produced by VIVA Films and GMA Pictures	
TBA	TBA	TBA	Marian Rivera	Produced by GMA Public Affairs, GMA Entertainment Group, Distributed only by GMA Pictures	
Note: Because these film projects are in production, the title, cast and directors are subject to change. There is also the possibility of the project to be shelved and pushed back for a later release date or totally be cancelled.
