= Silakbo =

1995 action crime film by Joel Lamangan

- Official movie poster
- Directed by: Joel C. Lamangan
- Written by: Roy C. Iglesias
- Produced by: William C. Leary
- Starring: Cesar Montano; Alice Dixson; Anjanette Abayari; Marjorie Barretto; Joko Diaz
- Cinematography: George Tutanes
- Edited by: Edgardo Vinarao
- Music by: Willy Cruz
- Production company: Viva Films
- Distributed by: Viva Films
- Release date: March 15, 1995
- Running time: 110 minutes
- Country: Philippines
- Language: Filipino

Silakbo is a 1995 Philippine action crime film directed by Joel Lamangan. The film stars Cesar Montano, Alice Dixson, Anjanette Abayari, Marjorie Barretto and Joko Diaz.

== Plot ==
Atty. Andy Gil, an agent of the National Bureau of Investigation was tasked to team-up with his ex-girlfriend Barbara "Bang" Briones and Rudy, to investigate a notorious serial killer. The serial killer has killed numerous women in Metro Manila, most of them being pick-up girls. His modus operandi, involves inviting his victim, and thereafter killing them by stabbing his victim from her throat, going down to her bellybutton. The latest victim is an accountant named Lolita Zacarias. Andy theorized that it might be a mimic killer, or someone who mimics the serial killer's style, who was behind the killing of Zacarias.

Andy is also in a toxic relationship with Tina Roman. The two began living together after Andy and Bang broke up. Andy is not comfortable with Bang, but Bang tried to be professional. Andy later met Cherry Acosta, who claims to know about the serial killer, saying, that she was threatened by the killer and was attacked. She would later identify the attacker as Mario Felix. Andy's superior, Greg, decided to have Cherry be put under the Witness Protection Program. She was then brought to a safehouse. Andy would develop an intimate relationship with Cherry. Bang then checked on her records in the company where she's working. Greg might think that Cherry might be assigned to a different branch, but Bang said that what she checked are central files. Andy said that she's only a trainee. Bang said that there was no Mario Felix in the record. But Andy said that they should have a manhunt operation. Greg decided to do what Andy and Bang suggested, have a manhunt operation on Mario Felix and set up a trap on the serial killer. Bang would go undercover as a pick-up girl in order to hunt down the killer. But nothing progresses as the serial killer once again killed another victim. While on a bar, Bang who identified herself as Bambi met David. As she is about to take off David's clothes, she noticed a hunting knife. She radioed Rudy and told them that she already hunted the killer. David tried to take advantage of Bang, but she escaped. Bang and Rudy would then fight David until Andy came and helped them. David would then fall from a high-rise building killing him instantly.

Bang would investigate about the murder of Lolita Zacarias. She then discovered that at the night of the murder, Andy was with her. Rudy would also identity the man who fell from the building as Leopoldo Natividad. Bang had Andy's fingerprints checked. According to her, there are five points of similarities on Andy's fingerprints and on Lolita Zacarias. For Bang, Andy is the prime suspect in the case. Andy confronted Bang about it. He said that what she's doing is having vengeance against him after they've broke up. Mario Felix was then apprehended. Greg said that Andy and Cherry should be here in order for Cherry to identify him. But Mario said that Cherry's real name is Arlene Abas, who was wanted of swindling and fraud. Bang said that Cherry is taking advantage of the Witness Protection Program so that she could hide to all of her victims. Tina then reported to Greg about Andy's relationship with Cherry, which is unethical and immoral. Andy also found out about Cherry's identity and was given a three-day suspension. Andy would become furious at Cherry and was given 24 hours to leave the safe house. Andy then threatened Tina for slandering him. While Cherry was about to leave, the power switch suddenly turned off and she was stabbed. She has the same stabbing pattern as the pattern of the serial killer. She also learned that Andy was the last person with Cherry. Bang would then entrap Andy. Andy attempted to escape, but he was later arrested. He was released for bail. Tina called Bang and told her that Andy threatened her. She said that she has every evidence that will send him to jail. Bang went to a house where Tina would often go when she and Andy would fight. Bang said that she will protect Tina from Andy. Tina saw that Bang brought a gun. Bang called Rudy and he told her that Leopoldo Natividad is the serial killer. Because the textile fibers matched with the textile fibers of the first 5 victims except for Lolita Zacarias and Cherry Acosta. When asked if Andy is the mimic killer, Rudy said that its negative, and the skin cell of the killer that was found at Cherry's didn't match to Andy. Rudy theorized that the mimic killer is someone who has a huge grudge on Andy and to all women he had relationships with.

Tina would about to kill Bang, indicating that she's the mimic killer. Both Tina and Bang fought until Tina hit Bang with a rock. Rudy came and he was about to be killed by Tina. Andy would come and shoot Tina as she was about to kill him. Both Andy and Rudy fought and as Tina is about to stab Andy, he stabbed her, and she died. As Greg and the police came, Andy insisted that Tina is the mimic killer, and he came to rescue Bang. But Bang and Rudy told Andy that they now believe in him. Bang apologized to Andy for accusing him and indicting him in this case. Andy said that he was deeply hurt when he and Bang broke up. Bang said that she only wants to be the only woman in Andy's life and the two rekindled their love for each other.

== Cast ==
- Cesar Montano as Atty. Andy Gil
- Alice Dixson as Barbara "Bang" Briones
- Anjanette Abayari as Tina Roman
- Marjorie Barretto as Arlene Abas/Cherry Acosta/Edna Olivarez
- Joko Diaz as Rudy
- Robert Arevalo as Atty. Greg Macaspac
- Rey PJ Abellana as Leopoldo Natividad/David
- Alicia Alonzo as Lolit Zacarias' Mother
- Dan Fernandez as Mario Felix
- Renato del Prado as Mang Pete
- Jim Pebanco as Young Executive
- Alma Lerma as Landlady
- Pocholo Montes as Attorney
- Michelle Parton as Lolit Zacarias
- Chiqui Pineda as Singer
- Manding Fernandez as Dirty Old Man
- Glydel Mercado as Chiqui
- Dante Javier as Dante

== Production ==
The initial cut of the film included a scene where a private part of Anjanette Abayari was shown while she was dancing. When director Joel Lamangan refused to remove that scene during post-production, Abayari consulted a lawyer. When the film was submitted to the Movie and Television Review and Classification Board for review, the board ruled in favor of Abayari and that scene was excluded on the final cut of the film.
