= Ella Arcangel =

Publication information
- Publisher: Haliya Publishing
- Format: Ongoing series
- Genre: Supernatural
- Publication date: August 2017 – present
- No. of issues: Volumes: 3

Creative team
- Created by: Julius Villanueva
- Written by: Julius Villanueva

Ella Arcangel is a Filipino comic series written and illustrated by Julius Villanueva.

== Publication history ==
Ella Arcangel is a comic series by Julius Villanueva who worked on the initial publication around 2015 to 2016.

Villanueva drew inspiration from his experience working as a freelancer for a reality television show research team when he often passes by a slum affected by gentrification. He names the 2009 film Coraline and local komik Trese as inspirations. It was originally conceptualized a young adult comic but Villanueva find there is something off if "he pulled his punches".

It was first published in August 2017 under Haliya Publishing. By 2020, there are already two volumes of the comic series.

== Plot ==
The story revolves around a 12-year-old girl named Ella who is a mambabarang. It is set in the fictional Barangay Masikap which is a slum area in Manila. Residents of the settlement deals with the realities of poverty as well as the dangers of various creatures from Philippine folklore.

== Bibliography ==
Volumes

- Ella Arcangel Tomo Una: Eto Ang Panganib
- Ella Arcangel Tomo Pangalawa: Awit ng Pangil at Kuko
- Ella Arcangel Tomo Pangatlo: Basbas ng Apoy

Other

- Ang Bangungot Ng Barangay Masikap

Spinoff

- Mga Pusa ng Barangay Masikap

== Animated adaptation ==
In May 2020, a 19-minute short film Ella Arcangel: Oyayi Sa Dilim was released. It was a collaboration between Villanueva and Mervin Malonzo of TABI PO komik and took two to three years to complete. A feature film titled Ella Arcangel: Awit ng Pangil at Kuko, which was first announced in 2021, is set to be released sometime in 2026 under GMA Pictures.
