= Bilang Na ang Araw Mo =

1996 action film by Toto Natividad

- Directed by: Toto Natividad
- Written by: Humilde "Meek" Roxas; Toto Natividad
- Based on: Carlito's Way by Brian de Palma
- Produced by: Eric Cuatico
- Starring: Cesar Montano; Charlene Gonzales; Rustom Padilla; Dennis Roldan
- Cinematography: Ramon Marcelino
- Edited by: Ruben Natividad
- Music by: Edwin "Kiko" Ortega
- Production company: Neo Films
- Distributed by: Viva Films
- Release date: June 12, 1996
- Running time: 97 minutes
- Country: Philippines
- Language: Filipino

Bilang Na ang Araw Mo (English: Your Days are Numbered) is a 1996 Philippine action film co-written and directed by Toto Natividad. The film stars Cesar Montano, Charlene Gonzales, Rustom Padilla and Dennis Roldan. It earned ₱6 million during its first day, making it the highest-grossing opening day film for Neo Films.

The film is streaming online on YouTube.

== Cast ==
- Cesar Montano as Rafael Fernandez
- Rustom Padilla as Atty. Martin Olivar
- Charlene Gonzales as Cathy
- Dennis Roldan as Rodel
- Willie Revillame as Dick
- Daniel Fernando as Andy
- Ricardo Cepeda as Bryan Montes
- Anthony Castelo as Gordon
- Subas Herrero as Don Esteban
- Shintaro Valdez as Cathy's Brother
- Tony Mabesa as Sen. Cepeda
- Brando Legaspi as Junior
- Rommel Montano as Nestor
- Michelle Parton as Joan
- Roy de Guzman as Brando del Mar

== Production ==
The film had a working title Utang ng Katawan, Kaluluwa ang Kabayaran. Ina Raymundo was originally cast in the film, but backed out due to scheduling conflicts and was replaced by Charlene Gonzales. Principal photography for the film began while Cesar Montano was halfway done with shooting for Utol, which is also directed by Toto Natividad for Star Cinema.
