= Ella Arcangel: Ballad of Tooth and Claw =

Upcoming Philippine animated film

- Theatrical release poster
- Directed by: Mervin Malonzo
- Written by: Mervin Malonzo; Julius Villanueva
- Based on: Ella Arcangel by Julius Villanueva
- Produced by: Manny Angeles; Avid Liongoren; Emmanuel Angeles
- Starring: Bianca Umali; Michael V.
- Music by: Arnold Buena; Joaquin Santos
- Production companies: GMA Pictures; Twenty Manila; Haliya Publishing; Rocketsheep Studio
- Distributed by: GMA Pictures
- Release date: 13 November 2026; (QIFF)
- Running time: 90 minutes
- Country: Philippines
- Language: Filipino

Ella Arcangel: Awit ng Pangil at Kuko, also known as Ella Arcangel: Ballad of Tooth and Claw in English, is a 2026 Philippine adult animated urban fantasy supernatural horror film based on the 2017 komik Ella Arcangel by Julius Villanueva. The film revolves a young mambabarang named Ella, who has a supernatural abilities with dark magic to fight both humans and mythical monsters in the city to protect her community.

The film is directed by Mervin Malonzo in his directorial debut, co-written with Villanueva, with Manny Angeles and Avid Liongoren served as producers under Rocketsheep Studio. Alongside the docudrama 58th, it is one of the first animated features co-produced and distributed by GMA Pictures, slated to release theatrically on 13 November 2026.

== Premise ==
Ella Arcangel, a 12 year old girl from the slums of Manila, succeeds her grandmother in battling supernatural entities that trouble the community. As Ella grapples with her new role, a monster surfaces and becomes the likely culprit to the death of the family of her playmate. Meanwhile, the government’s drug war presses on – making Ella question who she’s really up against and who the real monsters are.

— QCinema International Film Festival

== Cast ==
- Bianca Umali as Ella Arcangel
- Michael V. as Mimiw

== Production ==
=== Development ===
Awit ng Pangil at Kuko was announced as a next project after the May 2020 short film Ella Arcangel: Oyayi Sa Dilim. It was a collaboration between Ella author Julius Villanueva and Tabi Po creator Mervin Malonzo. In August 2020, Oyayi Sa Dilim was described as the "first episode" of an animated series with works on the "second episode" already ongoing.

In September 2021, it was announced that the potential second episode shifted to a full feature film based on Ella Arcangel Tomo 2: Awit ng Pangil at Kuko due to the longer length from the komik, which was in the works after the duo revealed they received a grant from the Film Development Council of the Philippines was secured. The premise of Ella Arcangel: Oyayi Sa Dilim served as the basis for the feature film, expanded from the first volume of the komik.

The animated feature film was unveiled as a part of QCinema Project Market Selections in 2023.

== Release ==
The film is scheduled to premiere at QCinema International Film Festival on November 13 to November 22, 2026.
