= Pagbabalik ng Probinsyano =

1998 Philippine action film directed by Ronwaldo Reyes

- Theatrical release poster
- Directed by: Ronwaldo Reyes
- Screenplay by: Manny Palo
- Story by: Ronwaldo Reyes
- Produced by: FPJ; Susan V. Tagle
- Starring: Fernando Poe Jr.
- Cinematography: Ver P. Reyes
- Edited by: Augusto Salvador
- Music by: Jaime Fabregas
- Production company: FPJ Productions
- Distributed by: Viva Films
- Release date: January 4, 1998
- Running time: 123 minutes
- Country: Philippines
- Language: Filipino

Pagbabalik ng Probinsyano (transl. The Return of the Provincial Man) is a 1998 Philippine action film co-written and directed by Fernando Poe Jr., who also reprises his role as Kardo de Leon, the titular "Probinsyano". The film is a sequel to the 1996 hit "Ang Probinsyano". The sequel shifts its focus from drug trafficking in the first film, to illegal mining and indigenous peoples' rights to ancestral lands.

== Plot ==
PLt Ricardo "Kardo" de Leon has been reassigned from his former post as the Chief of Police of Santa Marcela and is now Chief of Police of Marangani, a municipality inhabited by Maranganis, a tribe of Kalinga, whose people warmly adopted him as one of their own.

As Chief of Police, Kardo faces the twin threat of Allegre Mining, which is owned by Mr. Torralba and the Tawingan tribe. The former seeks to reopen a long dormant mine over the objections of the native Marangani tribe; the latter on the other hand, is locked in a bitter tribal war with the Maranganis and have been employed by Allegre Mining to harass the natives thus making it appear that attacks are in furtherance of the tribal war. Kardo survives attempts by Allegre to have him killed and after his adopted daughter Menchie is abducted, tracks her abductors down to the Allegre offices in Manila before returning to Kalinga to lead the villagers in storming the last holdouts of the Tawingans and Allegre's goons at the mine.

== Cast ==
- Fernando Poe Jr. as PLt. Ricardo "Kardo" de Leon
- Anjanette Abayari as Elaila
- Daniel Fernando as Ayangwa
- Lovely Rivero as Julie
- Subas Herrero as Emilio Torralba
- Paquito Diaz as Roque
- Amado Cortez as PCol Bernardo
- Ricardo Cepeda as Cortez
- Roldan Aquino as Rodrigo
- Melisse "Mumay" Santiago as Menchie Salazar
- Berting Labra as Titong
- Renato del Prado as Natong Luga
- Usman Hassim as Oying
- Maita Sanchez as Roselle
- Jethro Ramirez as Roselle's husband
- Ernie David as Estong
- Chiqui Glori
- Ben Sanchez
- Rudy Castillo
- Rene Carbon
- Romy Mangliwan
- Tony Bernal
- Jett Javier

== Awards and nominations ==
Award-Giving Body	Category	Recipient	Result
1999 FAMAS Awards
1999 FAMAS Awards	Best Director	Ronwaldo Reyes	Nominated
1999 FAMAS Awards	Best Child Actress	Melisse "Mumay" Santiago	Nominated

== See also ==
- Ang Probinsyano (film)
- Ang Probinsyano
