= Mandurugas =

Philippine action comedy film

- Directed by: Eddie Rodriguez
- Screenplay by: Humilde 'Meek' Roxas; Eddie Rodriguez
- Story by: Humilde 'Meek' Roxas
- Produced by: William Leary
- Starring: Dennis Padilla
- Cinematography: Sergio Lobo
- Edited by: Ike Jarlego Jr.
- Music by: Jaime Fabregas
- Production company: Viva Films
- Distributed by: Viva Films
- Release date: September 16, 1992
- Running time: 107 minutes
- Country: Philippines
- Language: Filipino

Mandurugas (lit. Swindler) is a 1992 Philippine action comedy film directed by Eddie Rodriguez. The film stars Dennis Padilla in the title role.

== Cast ==
- Dennis Padilla as Binoy
- Eddie Gutierrez as Alexander
- Janno Gibbs as Rannie
- Roi Vinzon as a policeman
- Daniel Fernando as Rey
- Donita Rose as Elaine
- Leah Orosa as Eva
- Mia Pratts as Jackie
- Atong Redillas as Ricky
- IC Mendoza as Empoy
- Chin-Chin Rodriguez as Nina
- Dick Israel as Maco
- Errol Dionisio as De Niro
- Lucita Soriano as Binoy's Sister
- Danny Labra as Al Capone
- Dexter Doria as Patring

== Release ==
=== Critical response ===
Justino Dormiendo of the Manila Standard gave the film a negative review for its fatuous plot and unpalatable direction.
