= Hangga't May Hininga =

1996 action film by Toto Natividad

- Directed by: Toto Natividad
- Screenplay by: Ricky Lee; Humilde "Meek" Roxas
- Story by: Michael de Mesa
- Produced by: Malou N. Santos
- Starring: Phillip Salvador; Anjanette Abayari
- Cinematography: Ramon Marcelino; Rudy Diño
- Edited by: Renato de Leon
- Music by: Mon del Rosario
- Production company: RS Productions
- Distributed by: Star Cinema
- Release date: September 25, 1996
- Running time: 103 minutes
- Country: Philippines
- Language: Filipino

Hangga't May Hininga (lit. As Long As There Is Breath) is a 1996 Philippine action film directed by Toto Natividad and written by Ricky Lee and Humilde "Meek" Roxas from a story developed by Michael de Mesa. The film stars Phillip Salvador and Anjanette Abayari.

The film is streaming online on YouTube.

== Cast ==
- Phillip Salvador as Capt. Ellis Soriano
- Anjanette Abayari as Leah
- Jackie Lou Blanco as Beth
- Tirso Cruz III as Cong. Ramirez
- Dennis Roldan as Acosta
- Paquito Diaz as Gen. Dominguez
- Karl Angelo Legaspi as Alex
- Dindo Arroyo as Edwin
- Allan Paule as Tony Boy
- Roy Alvarez as Billy Boy
- Dave Brodett as Carpio
- Manjo del Mundo as Roque
- Rene Hawkins as Warden
- Polly Cadsawan as Polly
- Freddie Ondra as Bagyo
- Ernie David as Prison
- Zandro Zamora as Hostage man
- Jose Balagtas as Labor Leader
