= Halik ng Vampira =

1997 Philippine horror film

- Official movie poster
- Directed by: Peque Gallaga; Lore Reyes
- Screenplay by: Henry Lopez
- Story by: Peque Gallaga
- Produced by: Orly Ilacad
- Starring: Anjanette Abayari
- Cinematography: Richard Padernal
- Edited by: Danny Gloria
- Music by: Tony Cortez
- Production companies: OctoArts Films; Cinemax Studios
- Distributed by: OctoArts Films
- Release date: June 11, 1997
- Running time: 90 minutes
- Country: Philippines
- Language: Filipino

Halik ng Vampira (literally "Vampire's Kiss) is a 1997 Philippine horror film directed by Peque Gallaga, who wrote the story, and Lore Reyes. The film stars Anjanette Abayari as the titular vampire.

== Plot ==
Vanessa is a cursed female vampire who poses as Midnight Solitaire, a sought-after caller on Dead Hour Dave's radio show, to get many victims. Living a double life, Vanessa finds love in Victor, whom she asks for help to cure her state.

== Cast ==
- Anjanette Abayari as Vanessa
- Raymond Bagatsing as Victor
- Beth Tamayo as Suzanne
- Michael V. as Dead Hour Dave
- Patrick Guzman as Sting
- Marc Solis as Michael
- Jason Salcedo as Jackson
- Jaime Fabregas as Dr. Hellgaarde
- Romy Romulo as Sgt. Bueno
- Nathan Forrest as Dexter
- Engie Allarey as Beth's Friend
- Ian Veneracion as Truck Driver
