= Ismael Zacarias =

1994 action film by Toto Natividad

- Theatrical release poster
- Directed by: Toto Natividad
- Screenplay by: Henry Nadong
- Story by: Edu Manzano
- Produced by: Victor Villegas
- Starring: Edu Manzano
- Cinematography: Ramon Marcelino
- Edited by: Renato de Leon; Ruben Natividad; Toto Natividad
- Music by: Mon del Rosario
- Production company: Moviestars Productions
- Distributed by: Moviestars Productions
- Release date: June 22, 1994
- Running time: 114 minutes
- Country: Philippines
- Languages: Filipino; English

Ismael Zacarias is a 1994 Philippine action film co-edited and directed by Toto Natividad. The film stars Edu Manzano, who wrote the story, in the title role. It was one of the entries in the 1994 Manila Film Festival, which spurred controversy when Edu Manzano initially lost his nomination for the Best Actor award, but was found to have been the real winner, following the discovery of a cheating scandal.

== Cast ==
- Edu Manzano as Lt. Ismael Zacarias
- Eddie Gutierrez as Don Pablo Lleva
- Plinky Recto as Rona
- Roi Vinzon as Enrique Lleva
- Alfred Manal as Tinoy
- Ramon Christopher as Edmund Lleva
- Dencio Padilla as Bugaloo
- Jaime Fabregas as Mr. Tanchoco
- Roldan Aquino as Maj. Roxas
- Dindo Arroyo as Ricky Boy
- Manjo del Mundo as Gomez
- Renato Robles as Col. Guevarra
- Renato del Prado as Pol
- Edwin Reyes as Eddie
- Dido dela Paz as Capt. Castro
- Jordan Castillo as Dindo
- Pocholo Montes as Col. Ravalo
- Cris Daluz as Kabise
- Ross Rival as Lolo
- Bebeng Amora as Snatcher
- Henry Nadong as Bartender

== Accolades ==
Year	Awards	Category	Recipient	Result	Ref.
1994	4th Manila Film Festival	Best Actor	Edu Manzano	Won	
1995	43rd FAMAS Awards	Best Child Actor	Alfred Manal	Nominated	
