= Toto Natividad =

Filipino director and politician (1957–2021)

- Born: Federico Natividad; July 19, 1957
- Died: April 27, 2021 (aged 63); San Fernando, Pampanga
- Occupations: Film director; editor; producer; writer
- Years active: 1986–2021
- Partner: Luz Naraga (2004–2021)

Federico Natividad (July 19, 1957 – April 27, 2021), professionally known as Toto Natividad, was a Filipino film editor, director and politician.

== Career ==
=== Film ===
In 2019, Natividad began work on what would become his last project, a disaster film called Faultline (originally titled The Big One) starring Kiko Matos, Jeffrey Santos, Phoebe Walker, Rob Sy, Don Umali and Niño Muhlach. In the same year, Natividad had also planned direct a series for GMA Network titled Rosang Agimat, but due to actor Eddie Garcia's death caused by an accident on set, the show was forced to be cancelled.

=== Politics ===
In May 2018, Natividad was elected barangay captain of NBBS Kaunlaran, Navotas.

== Filmography ==
=== Film ===
Year	Title	Director	Writer	Editor	Notes
1986	Platoon	No	No	asst. editor	
1987	Maruso (Robin Hood ng Angeles City)	No	No	Yes	
1988	A Case of Honor	No	No	Yes	
1989	Return from the River Kwai	No	No	asst. editor	
1990	Durugin ng Bala si Peter Torres	Yes	No	Yes	
1990	Ibabaon Kita sa Lupa	Yes	No	No	
1990	Delta Force 2: The Colombian Connection	No	No	addl. editor	
1990	Bato, Lupa, Putik	No	No	Yes	
1990	Hanggang Saan ang Tapang Mo	Yes	No	Yes	
1991	Para sa 'Yo ang Bala Ko!	Yes	No	Yes	
1991	Ang Siga at ang Sosyal	Yes	No	Yes	
1991	Isang Milyon sa Ulo ni Cobra	No	No	Yes	
1992	Totoy Guwapo, Alyas Kanto Boy	Yes	No	No	
1992	Sa Aking Puso: The Marcos "Bong" Manalang Story	Yes	No	No	
1992	Dudurugin Kita ng Bala ko	Yes	No	No	
1992	Alyas Pogi 2	Yes	No	No	
1992	Magdaleno Orbos: Sa Kuko ng Mga Lawin	No	No	Yes	
1992	Tondo: Libingan ng Mga Siga	Yes	No	No	
1992	Amang Capulong: Anak ng Tondo Part 2	Yes	No	No	
1993	Leonardo Delos Reyes, Alyas Waway	Yes	No	No	
1993	Lumuhod Ka sa Lupa	Yes	No	No	
1994	Ismael Zacarias	Yes	No	Yes	
1994	Ka Hector	Yes	No	No	
1995	Costales	Yes	No	No	Directed with Jose N. Carreon
1995	The Grepor Butch Belgica Story	Yes	No	Yes	
1995	Melencio Magat: Dugo Laban sa Dugo	Yes	No	No	
1995	Gayuma: Sana'y Mahalin Mo Rin Ako	No	No	Yes	
1995	Di Mapigil ang Init	Yes	No	Yes	Directed with Chito S. Roño
1996	Moises Arcangel: Sa Guhit ng Bala	Yes	No	No	
1996	Tubusin Mo ng Bala ang Puso Ko	Yes	No	Yes	
1996	Utol	Yes	No	Yes	
1996	Bilang Na ang Araw Mo	Yes	Yes	No	
1996	Akin ang Puri	Yes	No	No	
1996	Hangga't May Hininga	Yes	No	No	
1997	Anak ni Boy Negro	Yes	No	Yes	
1997	Wala Nang Iibigin Pang Iba	Yes	No	No	
1997	Pusakal	Yes	No	No	
1997	Sanggano	Yes	No	No	
1998	Laban Ko Ito... Walang Dapat Madamay	Yes	No	No	
1998	Wangbu	Yes	Yes	Yes	Also producer
1998	Kasangga... Kahit Kelan	Yes	No	No	
1998	Walang Katumbas ang Dugo	Yes	No	No	
1998	Notoryus	Yes	No	No	
1998	Warfreak	Yes	No	No	
1999	Type Kita... Walang Kokontra	Yes	No	No	
1999	Suspek	Yes	Story	Yes	
2000	Palaban	Yes	Story	No	
2000	Col. Elmer Jamias: Barako ng Maynila	Yes	No	No	Also line producer
2000	Ex-Con	Yes	No	No	
2000	Ping Lacson: Super Cop	Yes	No	No	
2002	Walang Iwanan, Peksman	Yes	No	No	Also producer
2004	Butakal: Sugapa sa Laman	Yes	No	No	Shot in 1999
2004	Anak Ka ng Tatay Mo	No	No	Yes	
2005	Paraiso	Yes	No	No	
2006	Tatlong Baraha	Yes	No	Yes	
2013	Saka-saka	Yes	Story	No	
2015	Pangil sa Tubig	Yes	No	No	Also line producer
2015	Angela Markado	Co-director	No	No	
2017	Corpus Delicti	Yes	Story	No	
2017	Double Barrel	Yes	Story	No	
2017	Riding in Tandem	Yes	Story	No	Also line producer
2022	Faultline	Yes	No	No	Posthumously released

==== As producer only ====
- Naglalagablab Na Gabi (1987)

==== Acting roles ====
Year	Title	Role	Notes	Ref(s).
1998	José Rizal	Katipunero		

=== Television ===
==== As director ====
Year	Title	Notes
1994	Tony Calvento's TV Hotline	
2005–06	Panday	
2008–09	Pieta	
2012	Lumayo Ka Man sa Akin	
2012	Pintada	
2013	Dugong Buhay	
2013–14	Galema: Anak ni Zuma	
2015	Ipaglaban Mo!	Episode: "Nasaan ang Konsensya?"
2015–18	FPJ's Ang Probinsyano	
2018–19	Cain at Abel	
