= Anjanette Abayari =

Filipino actress (born 1970)

- Born: Anjanette Palencia Abayari; July 20, 1970 (age 56)
- Other names: AJ, Jing
- Education: California State University
- Occupation: Actress
- Years active: 1991–1999
- Spouse: Gary Pangan
- Children: 2

Anjanette Palencia Abayari (born July 20, 1970) is a Filipino-American former actress and former beauty queen, known for portraying the superhero Darna in the 1994 film Mars Ravelo's Darna! Ang Pagbabalik.

Abayari was a former Bb. Pilipinas Universe title holder, but had to resign and give up her crown over the issue of her residency.

== Acting career ==
After a few music video appearances, including her role as Timmy T's leading lady in the video of his hit song "One More Try", Abayari joined the 1991 Binibining Pilipinas competition and won the top title. However, due to her non-Filipino citizenship and residency issues, she was dethroned with the title given to Ma. Lourdes "Alou" Gonzales.

After her stint in the pageant, she flew back in the US and continued cheerleading for LA Raiders and did modelling and hosting for Lowrider Magazine Events. A year later, she came back to the Philippines to embark on her acting career. She signed up for a two-year contract with Viva Films and was introduced in the movie Astig. Among her notable movies under Viva include Pita, Terror ng Kaloocan (1993), Darna! Ang Pagbabalik (1994) and Silakbo (1995). Other movies from various film outlets include Aringkingking: Ang Bodyguard Kong Sexy (1996), Matang Agila (1997) and Pagbabalik ng Probinsyano (1998).

== Controversy ==
In October 1999, Abayari was intercepted at the airport in Guam for possession of illegal drug amphetamine, which she vehemently denied was hers. She explained that the ballpen the airport officials found in her makeup kit belonged to her sister. She didn't even realize what they were doing when they scraped it to find traces of shabu. Due to her American citizenship, she was declared persona non grata by then-president Joseph Estrada, in which she was cleared by the Bureau of Immigration in 2003. In early 2000, after a few months of being detained, she was released after paying bail of $9200. She returned to the United States to live a simple and peaceful life, while taking on different jobs.

== Recent years ==
In 2004, Abayari staged her television comeback in The Filipino Channel’s 10th anniversary show at the Cow Palace, which was covered in ABS-CBN's Sunday noontime show ASAP. She was slated to be part of the show, but it didn't push through due to unknown reasons.

In 2013, Abayari became a regular guest on The Dr. Tess Show.

In 2014, after 14 years, she briefly returned to the Philippines to visit her father. At the same time, she was interviewed by various TV shows.

== Personal life ==
Her parents both hail from Iloilo with long time residence in the United States. She is the granddaughter of World War II veteran retired BGen. Alfonso P. Palencia.

She has two sons, Aiden and Ashton, both from different fathers. In March 2018, she was engaged to Evangelist Gary Pangan.

She runs a YouTube channel called "Anjanette Abayari Scriptures", which mainly focuses on Bible Studies.

== Filmography ==
=== Film ===
Year	Title	Role
1993	Astig	
1993	Dalawang Larawan ng Pagibig	
1993	Manchichiritchit	
1993	Pita, Terror ng Kaloocan	
1993	Row 4: Baliktorians	
1994	Ang Pagbabalik ni Pedro Penduko	Darna
1994	Brat Pack	
1994	Ober da Bakod: The Movie	
1994	Talahib at Rosas	Abba Jalandoni
1995	Ang Syota Kong Balikbayan	Cathy
1995	Batangueno Kabitenyo	
1995	Silakbo	Tina Roman
1996	Aringkingking: Ang Bodyguard Kong Sexy	
1996	Hangga't May Hininga	Leah
1996	Hindi Lahat ng Ahas ay Nasa Gubat	
1996	Tubusin Mo ng Bala ang Puso Ko	Kate
1997	Bandido	
1997	Halik ng Vampira	Vanessa
1997	Kadre	
1997	Matang Agila	
1998	Buenavista	
1998	Gagawin Ko ang Lahat	
1998	Pagbabalik ng Probinsyano	Elaila
1999	Dibdiban ang Laban	
2000	Azucena	Lily's mother

=== Television ===
- 1993–1995 - SST: Salo-Salo Together
- 1993 - Kool Skool
- 1995 - Halik Sa Pusod ng Gubat
- 1995 - Show & Tell
- 1998–1999 - Tropang Trumpo
- 1999 - Beh Bote Nga
- 2013–2015 - The Dr. Tess Show
