= Tubusin Mo ng Bala ang Puso Ko =

Philippine action film

- Directed by: Toto Natividad
- Screenplay by: Humilde "Meek" Roxas; Jake Tordesillas; Henry Nadong
- Story by: Edu Manzano
- Produced by: Orly Ilacad
- Starring: Edu Manzano; Anjanette Abayari
- Cinematography: Ramon Marcelino
- Edited by: Joyce Bernal; Toto Natividad
- Music by: Nonong Buencamino
- Production companies: OctoArts Films; Cinemax Studios
- Distributed by: OctoArts Films
- Release date: March 14, 1996
- Running time: 96 minutes
- Country: Philippines
- Language: Filipino

Tubusin Mo ng Bala ang Puso Ko (lit. Redeem My Heart with a Bullet) is a 1996 Philippine action film co-edited and directed by Toto Natividad The film stars Edu Manzano and Anjanette Abayari.

== Cast ==
- Edu Manzano as Lorenzo
- Anjanette Abayari as Kate
- Mark Gil as Frank
- Bembol Roco as Lt. Miranda
- Jeanette Fernando as Karen
- Ronaldo Valdez as Alfredo
- Perla Bautista as Kate's Mother
- Pocholo Montes as Kate's Father
- Archi Adamos as Benjie
- Dexter Doria as Manghuhula
- Roldan Aquino as Edward
- Danny Labra as Resthouse Caretaker
- Judy Teodoro as Kate's Friend
