= Utol =

1996 action film by Toto Natividad

- Directed by: Toto Natividad
- Screenplay by: Ricky Lee; Jerry Lopez Sineneng
- Based on: True Blood by Frank Kerr
- Produced by: Malou N. Santos
- Starring: Cesar Montano; Victor Neri
- Cinematography: Rudy Diño; Ramon Marcelino
- Edited by: Joyce Bernal; Toto Natividad
- Music by: Mon del Rosario
- Production company: Star Cinema
- Distributed by: Star Cinema
- Release date: April 25, 1996
- Running time: 103 minutes
- Country: Philippines
- Language: Filipino

Utol is a 1996 Philippine action film co-edited and directed by Toto Natividad from a screenplay written by Ricky Lee and Jerry Lopez Sineneng, loosely based on Frank Kerr's 1989 film True Blood. The film stars Cesar Montano and Victor Neri.

Produced and distributed by Star Cinema, the film was theatrically released on April 25, 1996.

The film is streaming online on YouTube.

== Plot ==
Jaime (Cesar) wants to break away from the syndicate led by Don Jose (Eddie) and start a new life with his brother Joey (Victor). However, Jaime had an unexpected encounter with Ador (Roldan) and his henchmen in a train station, causing him to leave Joey behind. Upon arrival to his province, Jaime faces arrest, leading to his suspicion that he is framed up by Don Jose. Years later, Jaime is released, only to find out that Joey is adopted by and now works for Don Jose. It will take some time for the brothers to reconcile with each other.

== Cast ==
- Cesar Montano as Jaime Cordero
- Eddie Gutierrez as Don Jose
- Alma Concepcion as Cora
- Victor Neri as Joey Cordero / Lito
  - Kjell Villamarin as Young Joey
- Bing Davao as Rommel
- Dindo Arroyo as Moran
- Marco Polo Garcia as Johnny
- Roldan Aquino as Ador
- Pen Medina as Mang Kanor
- Danny Labra as Rudy
- Lucy Quinto as Landlady

== Awards ==
Year	Awards	Category	Recipient	Result	Ref.
1997	47th FAMAS Awards	Best Actor	Cesar Montano	Nominated	
1997	16th FAP Awards	Best Supporting Actor	Victor Neri	Nominated	
