= Leon Cordero: Duwag Lang ang Hahalik sa Lupa =

Philippine action film

Leon Cordero
- Directed by: Baldo Marro
- Screenplay by: Eddie Pajarillo; Rolly Perello
- Story by: Baldo Marro; Eddie Pajarillo
- Produced by: Art Ilacad
- Starring: Raymart Santiago
- Cinematography: Apolinario Cuenco
- Edited by: Abelardo Hulleza
- Music by: Rey Magtoto
- Production companies: OctoArts Films; Cinemax Studios
- Distributed by: OctoArts Films
- Release date: June 12, 1996
- Running time: 100 minutes
- Country: Philippines
- Language: Filipino

Leon Cordero: Duwag Lang ang Hahalik sa Lupa (lit. Leon Cordero: Only a Coward Would Kiss the Ground) is a 1996 Philippine action film co-written and directed by Baldo Marro. The film stars Raymart Santiago in the title role.

== Cast ==
- Raymart Santiago as Leon Cordero
- Jennifer Mendoza as Marissa
- Lailani Navarro as Lilet
- Eddie Gutierrez as Don Salazar
- Marita Zobel as Meding
- King Gutierrez as Totoy Sputnik
- Dick Israel as Waray
- Manjo del Mundo as Claudio
- Ray Ventura as Turing
- Pen Medina as Tito Miroy
- Berting Labra as Tito Ambo
- Arabelle Cadocio as Raquel
- Boy Alvarez as Antik
- Angela Morena as Adiang
