= 'Wag Na 'Wag Kang Lalayo =

1996 Philippine action film

Wag na Wag Kang Lalayo
- Directed by: Jose N. Carreon
- Screenplay by: Jose N. Carreon
- Story by: Jose N. Carreon; Humilde "Meek" Roxas; Felix E. Dalay; Jojo Lapus
- Produced by: Orly Illacad
- Starring: Rudy Fernandez; Vina Morales
- Cinematography: Johnny Araojo; Jun Rasca
- Edited by: Edgardo Vinarao
- Music by: Jaime Fabregas
- Production companies: OctoArts Films; Cinemax Studios
- Distributed by: OctoArts Films
- Release date: October 2, 1996
- Running time: 100 minutes
- Country: Philippines
- Language: Filipino

Wag na Wag Kang Lalayo (lit. Don't Go Away Anymore) is a 1996 Philippine action film co-written and directed by Jose N. Carreon. The film stars Rudy Fernandez and Vina Morales. It is named after Vina's song from her 1995 album Easy to Love.

The film is available for stream online on YouTube.

== Plot ==
Genner (Rudy) is jailed for bank robbery. Just as he is about to be paroled, he is tapped by Mr. Villaroman (Robert), a corrupt parole officer, to be part of a bank robbery. During the robbery, Raquel (Vina), a bank employee, is held hostage. Upon realizing that both of them will get executed, Genner and Raquel escape from Villaroman's group.

== Cast ==
- Rudy Fernandez as Genner Ramirez
- Vina Morales as Raquel Garcia
- Tonton Gutierrez as Lawrence
- Eddie Rodriguez as Superintendent
- Robert Arevalo as Mr. Villaroman
- Efren Reyes Jr. as Sonny
- Dick Israel as Pidyong
- Juan Rodrigo as Mike
- Maila Gumila as Bank Auditor
- Rebecca Bautista as Mike's Wife
- Katrina Aguila as Raquel's Niece
- Bianca Aguila as Raquel's Niece
- Renato del Prado as Mang Rufo
- Edwin Reyes as Edwin
- Mike Enriquez as TV Reporter
- Lorna Tolentino as Victoria
