= Anak, Pagsubok Lamang ng Diyos =

Filipino action drama film

- Official movie poster
- Directed by: Deo J. Fajardo Jr.
- Screenplay by: Jose N. Carreon; Deo J. Fajardo Jr.
- Story by: Robin Padilla
- Produced by: Rose Flaminiano
- Starring: Robin Padilla
- Cinematography: Romeo Huete
- Edited by: Francis Vinarao
- Music by: Vehnee Saturno
- Production company: FLT Films
- Distributed by: FLT Films
- Release dates: January 9, 1996 (Greenhills); January 11, 1996
- Running time: 110 minutes
- Country: Philippines
- Language: Filipino

Anak, Pagsubok Lamang (marketed as Anak, Pagsubok Lamang ng Diyos) is a 1996 Philippine action drama film directed by Deo J. Fajardo Jr. The film stars Robin Padilla, who wrote the story while serving a 17-year jail term for illegal possession of firearms. It also marks the film debut of Izza Ignacio and Mikey Arroyo.

== Cast ==
- Robin Padilla as Rico
- Sharmaine Arnaiz as Kathryn
- Jean Garcia as Kathryn's sister
- Eva Cariño-Padilla as Aling Edna
- Tirso Cruz III as Warden
- Michael Rivero as Bingo
- Ramon Christopher as Dennis
- Jude Estrada as Joey
- Ricky Davao as Escandor
- Iza Ignacio as Vicky
- Miguel Macapagal Arroyo as Mike
- Jacku Flaminiano as Sonny Boy
- Berting Labra as Teng Teng
- Romeo Rivera as Kathryn's father
- Kevin Delgado as abusive inmate
- Ernie Zarate as prison director
- Tony Carreon as politician
- Alex Cunanan as Alex
- Boy Gutierrez as Aling Edna's doctor
- Nonong Talbo as Escandor's lawyer
- Ric Sanchez as lawyer
- Uldarico Jamora as judge
- Luis Benedicto as Rico's doctor
- Gio Santos as Gio
- Ritchie Rivas as Ritchie
- Dave Agbulos as Rico's Lawyer
- Lyn Erastain as Sonny Boy's yaya

== Production ==
The film was shot mostly inside the New Bilibid Prison, where Robin Padilla was serving a 17-year jail term for illegal possession of firearms. It caught the attention of Viva Films, which sued Padilla for breach of contract in which he is an exclusive artist. This prompted the film's release, originally in late 1995, to be delayed to January 1996.

== Release ==
The film premiered at a theater in Greenhills, San Juan on January 9, 1996, with GMA Network's coverage of the event through the program Inside Showbiz being hosted by Aster Amoyo, Jackielou Blanco, Oskee Salazar, and Aga Muhlach. The film was released nationwide on January 11, 1996.
