= Rio Del Mar (TV series) =

Philippine television drama series

- Genre: Drama
- Written by: Bibeth Orteza; Devine Babat; Suzette Doctolero; Che Marcelo
- Directed by: Mel Chionglo; Jeffrey Jeturian; Gina Alajar
- Starring: Vivian Velez
- Theme music composer: Joey de Leon
- Opening theme: "Rio del Mar" by Aiza Seguerra
- Country of origin: Philippines
- Original language: Tagalog
- No. of episodes: 541

Production
- Executive producers: Antonio P. Tuviera; Malou Choa-Fagar
- Producer: Antonio P. Tuviera
- Camera setup: Multiple-camera setup
- Running time: 30 minutes
- Production company: TAPE Inc.

Original release
- Network: GMA Network
- Release: February 15, 1999 – March 9, 2001

Rio del Mar (transl. sea river) is a Philippine television drama series broadcast by GMA Network. Directed by Mel Chionglo, Jeffrey Jeturian and Gina Alajar, it stars Vivian Velez. It premiered on February 15, 1999. The series concluded on March 9, 2001, with a total of 541 episodes.

== Cast and characters ==
Cast

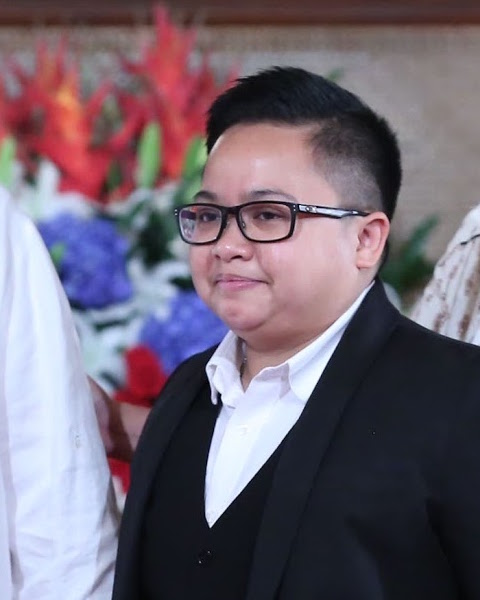
Aiza Seguerra

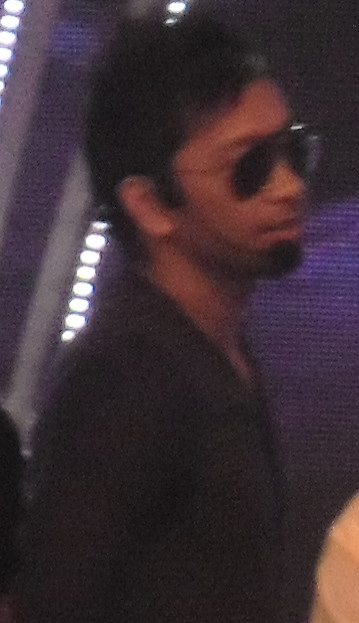
Jhong Hilario

Lead cast

- Vivian Velez as Bianca

Supporting cast

- Michael de Mesa as Anton
- Celia Rodriguez as Candida
- Krista Ranillo as Giselle
- Melisse "Mumay" Santiago as Stefany
- Aiza Seguerra as Anna
- Cogie Domingo as Gerald
- Jhong Hilario as Rodel
- AJ Eigenmann as Jon-Jon
- Stella Ruiz as Eloisa
- Menggie Cobarubias as Pio
- Arisa Azakawa as Lizelle

Guest cast

- Ronaldo Valdez as Conrado
- Dennis Roldan as Miguel Bautista
- Julio Diaz
- Sharmaine Arnaiz
- Val Sotto
- Daisy Reyes
- Nina Medina
