= Room for Rent =

Room for Rent may refer to the following:

== Film ==
- Room for Rent (1996 film), a Philippine romantic comedy film
- Room for Rent (2017 film), a Canadian comedy/mystery film
- Room for Rent (2019 film), an American mystery-horror film

== Television ==
- "Room for Rent", a 1961 episode of Bringing Up Buddy
- "Rooms for Rent", a 1961 episode of The Flintstones
- "The Tale of a Room for Rent", a 1994 episode of List of Are You Afraid of the Dark?
