= List of Bilangin ang Bituin sa Langit episodes =

Bilangin ang Bituin sa Langit is a 2020 Philippine television drama series broadcast by GMA Network. It aired on the network's Afternoon Prime line up and worldwide on GMA Pinoy TV from February 24, 2020, to March 26, 2021, replacing Madrasta.

== Series overview ==
Season	Episodes	Originally released	
Season	Episodes	First released	Last released
1	80	February 24, 2020	March 26, 2021

== Episodes ==
No. overall	No. in season	Title	Social media hashtag	Original release date	Prod. code	AGB Nielsen Ratings (NUTAM People)	Timeslot rank
1	1	"Unang Pitas" (transl. First Pick)	#BBLUnangPitas	February 24, 2020	1071 - A	5.1%	#2
2	2	"Mud Fight"	#BBLMudFight	February 25, 2020	1072 - B	6.0%	#1
3	3	"Two Timer"	#BBLTwoTimer	February 26, 2020	1073 - C	5.5%	#1
4	4	"Masamang Balak" (transl. Bad Intention)	#BBLMasamangBalak	February 27, 2020	1074 - D	5.1%	#1
5	5	"Paalam, Damian" (transl. Goodbye, Damian)	#BBLPaalamDamian	February 28, 2020	1075 - E	5.2%	#1
6	6	"Cedes Wanted"	#BBLCedesWanted	March 2, 2020	1076 - F	5.0%	#1
7	7	"Baby Maggie"	#BBLBabyMaggie	March 3, 2020	1077 - G	5.2%	#1
8	8	"Pagtatagpo" (transl. Encounter)	#BBLPagtatagpo	March 4, 2020	1078 - H	5.7%	#1
9	9	"Bitter Reunion"	#BBLBitterReunion	March 5, 2020	1085 - J	6.0%	#1
10	10	"Pagsusumikap" (transl. Hard Work)	#BBLPagsusumikap	March 6, 2020	1084 - I	6.6%	#1
11	11	"Mother's Love"	#BBLMothersLove	March 9, 2020	1086 - K	6.2%	#1
12	12	"The Proposal"	#BBLTheProposal	March 10, 2020	1087 - L	5.7%	#1
13	13	"Maggie Meets Grams"	#BBLMaggieMeetsGrams	March 11, 2020	1088 - M	6.2%	#1
14	14	"Balik Alindog" (transl. Return to Charm)	#BBLBalikAlindog	March 12, 2020	1089 - N	6.5%	#1
15	15	"Maggie Meets Cedes"	#BBLMaggieMeetsCedes	March 13, 2020	1090 - O	6.9%	#1
16	16	"Pikon Talo" (transl. Whoever's Touchy is the Loser)	#BBLPikonTalo	March 16, 2020	1092 - Q	7.3%	#1
17	17	"CCTV Kiss"	#BBLCCTVKiss	March 17, 2020	1091 - P	8.1%	#1
18	18	"Backfire"	#BBLBackfire	March 18, 2020	1093 - R	7.7%	#1
19	19	"Fake News"	#BBLFakeNews	March 19, 2020	1095 - T	7.5%	#1
20	20	"Maggie Meets Margaux"	#BBLMaggieMeetsMargaux	March 20, 2020	1094 - S	6.9%	#2
21	21	"Jun at Maggie, Sila Na" (transl. Jun and Maggie in a Relationship)	#BBLJunMaggieSilaNa	March 23, 2020	1096 - U	N/A	TBA
22	22	"Kutob" (transl. Hunch)	#BBLKutob	January 5, 2021	BBL - 551 - V	8.9%	#1
23	23	"Paghihiganti" (transl. Revenge)	#BBLPaghihiganti	January 6, 2021	BBL - 552 - W	N/A	TBA
24	24	"Bawal na Pag-ibig" (transl. Forbidden Love)	#BBLBawalNaPagibig	January 7, 2021	BBL - 553 - X	N/A	TBA
25	25	"Missing"	#BBLMissing	January 8, 2021	BBL - 555 - Z	7.9%	#1
26	26	"Betrayal"	#BBLBetrayal	January 11, 2021	BBL - 556 - AA	8.6%	#1
27	27	"Masamang Balak" (transl. Evil Plan)	#BBLMasamangBalak	January 12, 2021	BBL - 554 - Y	9.3%	#1
28	28	"Bad Omen"	#BBLBadOmen	January 13, 2021	BBL - 557 - BB	8.3%	#1
29	29	"Bad Blood"	#BBLBadBlood	January 14, 2021	BBL - 558 - CC	8.5%	#1
30	30	"Sakripisyo" (transl. Sacrifice)	#BBLSakripisyo	January 15, 2021	BBL - 559 - DD	8.1%	#1
31	31	"Tagpuan" (transl. Meeting Place)	#BBLTagpuan	January 18, 2021	BBL - 561 - FF	9.3%	#1
32	32	"Breakup"	#BBLBreakUp	January 19, 2021	BBL - 562 - GG	8.2%	#1
33	33	"Downfall"	#BBLDownfall	January 20, 2021	BBL - 563 - HH	9.6%	#1
34	34	"Hit and Run"	#BBLHitAndRun	January 21, 2021	BBL - 560 - EE	8.4%	#1
35	35	"Pangitain" (transl. Vision)	#BBLPangitain	January 22, 2021	BBL - 564 - II	9.0%	#1
36	36	"Reunion"	#BBLReunion	January 25, 2021	BBL - 565 - JJ	9.3%	#1
37	37	"Witness"	#BBLWitness	January 26, 2021	BBL - 566 - KK	N/A	TBA
38	38	"Muling Pagkikita" (transl. Meeting Again)	#BBLMulingPagkikita	January 27, 2021	BBL - 567 - LL	N/A	TBA
39	39	"Walk Out"	#BBLWalkOut	January 28, 2021	BBL - 568 - MM	N/A	TBA
40	40	"Bintang" (transl. Blame)	#BBLBintang	January 29, 2021	BBL - 569 - NN	N/A	TBA
41	41	"Bribery"	#BBLBribery	February 1, 2021	BBL - 630 - OO	9.2%	#1
42	42	"Mana" (transl. Inheritance)	#BBLMana	February 2, 2021	BBL - 631 - PP	9.9%	#1
43	43	"Masamang Panaginip" (transl. Bad Dream)	#BBLMasamangPanaginip	February 3, 2021	BBL - 632 - QQ	9.6%	#1
44	44	"Bagong Buhay" (transl. New Life)	#BBLBagongBuhay	February 4, 2021	BBL - 633 - RR	10.7%	#1
45	45	"Tapatan" (transl. Confrontation)	#BBLTapatan	February 5, 2021	BBL - 634 - SS	10.5%	#1
46	46	"Love Hurts"	#BBLLoveHurts	February 8, 2021	BBL - 636 - UU	N/A	TBA
47	47	"Asar Talo" (transl. Irritable)	#BBLAsarTalo	February 9, 2021	BBL - 635 - TT	11.1%	#1
48	48	"Dukot" (transl. Capture)	#BBLDukot	February 10, 2021	BBL - 637 - VV	N/A	TBA
49	49	"Fight for Love"	#BBLFightForLove	February 11, 2021	BBL - 638 - WW	9.7%	#1
50	50	"Gantihan" (transl. Revenge)	#BBLGantihan	February 12, 2021	BBL - 639 - XX	N/A	TBA
51	51	"Jun's Proposal"	#BBLJunsProposal	February 15, 2021	BBL - 640 - YY	N/A	TBA
52	52	"Forbidden Love"	#BBLForbiddenLove	February 16, 2021	BBL - 641 - ZZ	N/A	TBA
53	53	"Tanan" (transl. Escape)	#BBLTanan	February 17, 2021	BBL - 642 - AAA	9.3%	#1
54	54	"Kadugo" (transl. Blood Relative)	#BBLKadugo	February 18, 2021	BBL - 643 - BBB	N/A	TBA
55	55	"Truth Hurts"	#BBLTruthHurts	February 19, 2021	BBL - 644 - CCC	N/A	TBA
56	56	"Break-up"	#BBLBreakUp	February 22, 2021	BBL - 645 - DDD	9.3%	#1
57	57	"Tunay na Ama" (transl. Real Father)	#BBLTunayNaAma	February 23, 2021	BBL - 646 - EEE	9.1%	#1
58	58	"DNA Test"	#BBLDNATest	February 24, 2021	BBL - 647 - FFF	9.6%	#1
59	59	"Hard Truth"	#BBLHardTruth	February 25, 2021	BBL - 648 - GGG	N/A	TBA
60	60	"Pagsuyo" (transl. Affection)	#BBLPagsuyo	February 26, 2021	BBL - 649 - HHH	7.6%	#1
61	61	"Desisyon ni Maggie" (transl. Maggie's Decision)	#BBLDesisyonNiMaggie	March 1, 2021	BBL - 690 - III	8.3%	#1
62	62	"Paglayo" (transl. Distance)	#BBLPaglayo	March 2, 2021	BBL - 691 - JJJ	7.7%	#1
63	63	"Letting Go"	#BBLLettingGo	March 3, 2021	BBL - 693 - LLL	8.4%	#1
64	64	"Hinagpis ni Cedes" (transl. Cedes' Grievance)	#BBLHinagpisNiCedes	March 4, 2021	BBL - 694 - MMM	N/A	TBA
65	65	"Margaux's Denial"	#BBLMargauxDenial	March 5, 2021	BBL - 695 - NNN	8.0%	#1
66	66	"Minahal Kita" (transl. I Loved You)	#BBLMinahalKita	March 8, 2021	BBL - 696 - OOO	7.5%	#1
67	67	"Banta" (transl. Threat)	#BBLBanta	March 9, 2021	BBL - 692 - KKK	7.6%	#1
68	68	"Huli Ka, Margaux" (transl. Caught You, Margaux)	#BBLHuliKaMargaux	March 10, 2021	BBL - 697 - PPP	8.1%	#1
69	69	"Pagtataksil" (transl. Treachery)	#BBLPagtataksil	March 11, 2021	BBL - 698 - QQQ	8.1%	#1
70	70	"Hinala" (transl. Suspicion)	#BBLHinala	March 12, 2021	BBL - 699 - RRR	7.6%	#1
71	71	"False Promises"	#BBLFalsePromises	March 15, 2021	BBL - 701 - TTT	8.6%	#1
72	72	"Margaux Desperada" (transl. Desperate Margaux)	#BBLMargauxDesperada	March 16, 2021	BBL - 700 - SSS	8.2%	#1
73	73	"Walk Out"	#BBLWalkOut	March 17, 2021	BBL - 702 - UUU	8.9%	#1
74	74	"No More Lies"	#BBLNoMoreLies	March 18, 2021	BBL - 704 - WWW	N/A	TBA
75	75	"Goodbye, Margaux"	#BBLGoodbyeMargaux	March 19, 2021	BBL - 703 - VVV	8.6%	#1
76	76	"True Love Wins"	#BBLTrueLoveWins	March 22, 2021	BBL - 705 - XXX	7.8%	#1
77	77	"Espiya" (transl. Spy)	#BBLEspiya	March 23, 2021	BBL - 706 - YYY	N/A	TBA
78	78	"Agaw Buhay" (transl. Dying)	#BBLAgawBuhay	March 24, 2021	BBL - 707 - ZZZ	9.3%	#1
79	79	"Last Goodbye"	#BBLLastGoodbye	March 25, 2021	BBL - 708 - a	8.6%	#1
80	80	"Pagpaparaya" (transl. Freedom)	#BBLPagpaparaya	March 26, 2021	BBL - 709 - b	8.8%	#1
