= Tubig at Langis =

2016 Philippine television drama series

- Title card
- Also known as: Broken Vows
- Genre: Family; Melodrama; Romance; Revenge
- Created by: Gina Marissa Tagasa
- Based on: Langis at Tubig by Danny Zialcita
- Written by: Gina Marissa Tagasa; Carmela Abaygar; Raymund Barcelon; Bridgette Ann Rebuca; Genesis Rodriguez; Randy Villanueva
- Directed by: FM Reyes; Raymund Ocampo; Lyan Suiza; Jerome Pobocan
- Starring: Cristine Reyes; Zanjoe Marudo; Isabelle Daza
- Opening theme: "Langis at Tubig" by Lani Misalucha
- Ending theme: "Tubig at Langis" by Sharon Cuneta
- Composers: George Canseco; Gerard Salonga
- Country of origin: Philippines
- Original language: Filipino
- No. of seasons: 3
- No. of episodes: 151 (list of episodes)

Production
- Executive producers: Carlo Katigbak; Cory Vidanes; Laurenti Dyogi; Ruel Bayani
- Producers: Celeste Villanueva-Lumasac; Rizza Gonzales-Ebriega; Jayson Aracap Tabigue; Rachel Aguilos (Post-production)
- Production locations: Metro Manila, Philippines; Bulacan, Philippines
- Editors: Jay Mendoza; Bernie Diasanta
- Running time: 30–33 minutes
- Production company: RSB Drama Unit

Original release
- Network: ABS-CBN
- Release: February 1 – September 2, 2016

Related
- Langis at Tubig (1980 film)

Tubig at Langis (International title: Broken Vows / lit. 'water and oil') is a 2016 Philippine television drama romance series broadcast by ABS-CBN. The series is based on 1980 Philippine film of the same name. Directed by FM Reyes, Raymund B. Ocampo, Lyan L. Suiza and Jerome C. Pobocan, it stars Cristine Reyes, Zanjoe Marudo and Isabelle Daza. It aired on the network's Kapamilya Gold line up and worldwide on TFC from February 1 to September 2, 2016.

Marudo and Reyes reunited in the series after Star Cinema's Bromance: My Brother's Romance from 2013. Vivian Velez resigned from the series due to difficulties working with Cristine Reyes.

== Premise ==
=== Season 1 ===
Tubig at Langis began with Irene (Cristine Reyes), a good and responsible daughter, being made pregnant by Jaime (Victor Silayan). Meanwhile, Jaime didn't tell Irene that he was a married man and had a family of his own residing in Australia. He decided to leave Irene and their child, Mico (Miguel Vergara), behind, forcing her to raise him on her own.

After five years, Irene has moved on and reconnected with her high school sweetheart, Natoy (Zanjoe Marudo). They got married but failed to conceive a child after many attempts. On the other hand, Natoy's family could not accept Irene because she has a child from her previous relationship. One day, Irene and Natoy consulted a doctor because she began showing signs of pregnancy. At first, the doctor declared that Irene was pregnant, but on the second ultrasound, the doctor found out that the baby did not have a heartbeat anymore, as Irene had a miscarriage.

Meanwhile, Jaime returned to Irene at a party that Irene organized for Conching (Vivian Velez). Then, the friends of Conching took a group picture but after they have taken a look at it, they saw Jaime hugging Irene whom they mislead as the third party. Conching then showed Natoy the photo, urging him to follow Irene. After he followed Irene, he saw Jaime holding Irene's hand. After what he saw, he went to Clara (Isabelle Daza) drunk and he accidentally got Clara pregnant.

Irene then saw Clara and Natoy at an apartment that Natoy bought for Clara because her father was always hurting her. Natoy then told Irene the truth that he and Clara will be having a child. When Irene's father, Domeng (Lito Pimentel) and Tope (Marco Gumabao) knew about Natoy's unfaithfulness, he immediately went to Natoy's house to confront him because of lying to Irene. While Domeng was hitting Natoy, Conching had a heart attack, causing her to die. Lucy (Dionne Monsanto), Conching's middle child, wants justice for what happened to her mom so she filed cases against Tope and Domeng. Tope was released from prison because it was proven that he was only there to stop Domeng from confronting Natoy.

At the court trial about cases filed against Domeng, Lucy's testimonies were first, but Lucy lied about the case. She said that Domeng hit Natoy and Conching that caused Conching's heart attack. On the second day of court, Natoy testified for Irene saying that he was the only one that Domeng attacked, that he did not touch Conching. Irene has finally forgiven Natoy for what he did. On the other hand, Clara kept bragging about her baby to Irene and told her that wedding papers were the only reason why Natoy was still with Irene.

=== Season 2 ===
One night, Natoy made a plan on a resort to surprise Irene on her birthday and have a vacation. Meanwhile, Clara followed them to ruin Irene's birthday. One night on the resort, Clara put a sedative in Natoy's drink. Clara then started kissing Natoy and used her cellphone to film them. When Natoy regained consciousness but was still a little groggy, he saw Clara and thought she was Irene. Emma (Ingrid dela Paz) went to Clara's room to visit Baby Nathan (Clara's Child) but instead of seeing Nathan, she saw Natoy and Clara kissing each other lying on the sofa. When Natoy was finally awake, he saw Clara and immediately pushed her away.

Natoy and Irene tried their hardest to conceive a baby. Irene set an appointment with a doctor for conceiving a baby and Clara offered to go with her to the hospital. When Irene passed out in the hospital, Clara called Natoy and Jaime. Jaime went to Irene bringing a sedative, but Irene woke up before Jaime could use it on her, and Natoy heard Irene shouting for help. This caused Irene to file a restraining order against Jaime.

Clara got pregnant again and claimed that Natoy was the father of the baby. Clara also forced Emma to tell Irene that she saw them because Clara knew that Emma was the one who saw them. Emma told Irene the truth of how she saw Clara and Natoy at the resort and that she is sure that something happened to them. Irene got angry at Natoy for the second time which really tested their love for each other. Irene then decided to break up with Natoy and said that she loved Natoy, but love was not enough. Clara, on the other hand, was happy because of the success of her plans.

After the break up, Irene discovered that she was pregnant with Natoy's baby. However, Irene chose not to tell Natoy about the baby. She would rather be a single mom than tell Natoy about the baby when her heart is full of anger and pain. Natoy on the other hand, had a problem on his business Villadolid seafoods because of his Aunt Mira (Jean Saburit). Aunt Mira offered help about the shrimp in the business but did not do her job well by mixing unhealthy shrimp and healthy ones that caused healthy shrimp to die and almost caused Natoy's business to fail.

Natoy still could not believe that he was the father of Clara's baby so he did a paternity test. The result shocked Natoy because it showed that he really was the father of Clara's child, making Irene mad at Natoy, causing her to cut ties with him. What really happened was, the day before the paternity test, Jaime had tampered with the results by changing the name of the alleged father from Jaime Agoncillo to Natoy Villadolid, making it look like that Natoy was really the father of Clara's baby.

Jaime gave the tampered results to Irene. This infuriated her so she left to confront Natoy. Meanwhile, Josie (Ynez Veneracion), Irene's biological mother, followed her and got hit by a car because of Irene. After that, Jaime accompanied Becca to send her to the hospital so he could see Irene. Natoy then followed Jaime and discovered that Irene was pregnant, but Irene did not want Natoy to come back to her.

Lucy, on the other hand, wanted her mom's wealth because Conching gave it all to Clara. Lucy then tried to change her mom's last will and testament but instead of getting the wealth and everything that Conching gave to Clara, the court decided that Lucy had no right to get her mom's wealth because she was just adopted by Conching.

Natoy then discovered that Jaime is wanted in Australia for killing his first wife, Nancy (Antoinette Taus) and for borrowing money from his friends without repaying it. He killed Nancy for the sake of getting back with Irene. He brought Irene to an abandoned restaurant and proposed to her. Irene went with Jaime because she thought that it was a client meeting instead of a proposal. Irene did not accept the proposal and pushed him away. Natoy and the police saw them. Jaime took Irene to the kitchen of the restaurant to escape from the police, but Irene escaped from Jaime and Jaime escaped from the police.

Jaime convinced Lucy to help him meet with Mico. Lucy agreed to help him with his plan, but a tragic accident happened - Natoy saved Mico from getting hit by a motorcycle, which was planned by Clara's father. Natoy was brought to the hospital but was still unconscious. He fell into a coma. Meanwhile, Lucy worked against Clara to get the last will and testament of her mom. Emma helped Lucy because she was the only one who had legal rights. After that, Clara was evicted again from the Villadolid house.

Jaime felt guilty for all that he did to Natoy and Irene. One night, Jaime told Clara to meet in front of Irene's house to tell the truth that Natoy is not the biological father of Clara's second baby, but Clara realized that it was Jaime's plan to tell the truth, and when they were in front of Irene's house, Clara broke a bottle and stabbed Jaime. Despite that, Jaime still managed to tell the truth to Irene, even in his last breath.

Clara is now wanted for homicide because of killing Jaime. Irene and Lucy made a scene because Clara had the guts to go to Jaime's wake, even though she was the one who killed him. Clara denied that she killed Jaime. She also denied that Jaime was the father of her second baby, even though the truth was completely spoiled that Natoy is not the father but Jaime. Reybong (Archie Alemania) called the police to catch Clara before she can escape again. After Jaime's funeral, the Villadolids and the Magdangals went to the court for a hearing about their case against Clara. Clara was found guilty and sentenced to life imprisonment. Mira then received the DNA test that she made about her child. It turned out that Lucy was her child but Lucy cannot accept Mira as her mother. Irene gave birth while Clara mourned the loss of her child due to a war in prison. Nestor, Clara's father, helped Clara to escape from prison. After that, he taught Clara how to use a gun for her revenge on Irene and the Villadolid family.

Nestor then went to the mansion of the Villadolid to win Nathan back and attacked Lucy and Irene's car in exchange for Nathan. Unfortunately, Lucy was the one who was abducted. Since the car windows were tinted and they could not see Irene and Lucy inside, Lucy got out of the car thinking of Irene's safety. Hours after Lucy was abducted, she managed to escape from Clara, Nestor and Jun. Mira and Natoy found Lucy and Mira finally gained the forgiveness that she longed for from her daughter, Lucy.

Afterwards, Clara threatened Natoy that she would shoot Irene, Mico or Natoy's new child, Emily. He quickly went to Clara with the police to protect his family. After, Natoy and the police went to the hideout of Nestor, Clara and Jun. Jun offered to distract the police. When he tried to escape, he was shot by the police and was killed, which angered Clara who vowed revenge on Natoy and Irene.

=== Season 3 ===
Clara and Nestor were the only ones left now that Jun was gone. One night, they prepared a party for Domeng's birthday, not knowing the danger that awaited them. Clara and Nestor poured gas all over the house for them to get Nathan. Nestor then let the house explode with Nathan inside. Everyone in the house was safe, but Clara and Nestor still did not stop their evil plans.

Nestor went to the hospital where Natoy and Irene's family were being treated, to get Nathan. Natoy saw him and ran after him, so as the police. Natoy caught Nestor, and they fought until Nestor was placed inside a machine where he got squeezed and later died.

The Villadolid family decided to transfer to a safer place where Clara could not find them. Natoy and Irene together with their child Emily went first to the new house. But when Natoy decided to buy food and drinks, he did not notice that Clara was spying on them, and so as Natoy was buying food, Clara entered the car and immediately abducted Irene. Clara brought Irene to where Natoy and Clara first met. She was unstoppable in killing Irene and Emily, so that Natoy will only love her and Nathan. Natoy saw Irene lying on the ground with Clara pointing a gun on her. When she saw Natoy's love for Irene, she felt guilty and decided to kill herself instead. But Irene and Natoy stopped her from doing that because she has a child. Clara then surrendered to the police.

Natoy asked Irene to marry him again as a sign of a new start now that there are no more worries about Clara or Nestor. They married each other again, and they lived happily ever after.

== Cast and characters ==
Cast	Role	Character Notes
Cristine Reyes	Irene Magdangal-Villadolid	(Note: A brash and aggressive girl, who will fight for her feelings for her husband Natoy. She is Domeng and Josie's biological daughter, Becca's step-daughter, Tope's older step-sister, Mico and Emily's mother, and Nathan's step-mother, Emma's older sister in-law, Lucy's sister in-law, and Conching and Vicente's daughter in-law. (seasons 1-3) Later, she renews her wedding vows with Natoy.)
Zanjoe Marudo	Renato "Natoy" B. Villadolid	(Note: Irene's husband and former high school classmate. Conching and Vicente's son, Domeng and Josie's son in-law, Becca's step-son in-law, Mira's nephew, Emma's older brother, Tupe's older step-brother in-law, Lucy's half-brother, Nathan and Emily's father, and Mico's adoptive father. He has an affair with Clara, resulting in Nathan. He eventually decides that Irene is the one he truly loves and is determined for their relationship as well as adopting Mico as his own son throughout the series, even with disapproval from his family. (seasons 1-3))
Isabelle Daza	Clara Samaniego	(Note: Nathan's mother, Nestor's daughter and Jun's cousin/adoptive brother. She plans her revenge against the Villadolids and attempts to kill Irene, later she surrenders to the police and renews herself in prison but later dies due to ovarian cancer that was never hospitalized. (seasons 1-3) She is the main antagonist of the series.)
Jean Saburit	Altamira "Mira" Beltran-Peterson	(Note: Lucy's biological mother, Natoy and Emma's aunt, Conching's younger sister who loathes her, Nathan and Emily's great aunt/grandmother, and Mico's adoptive grandmother. She returned to the Villadolids to get her revenge and Conching's will, then later found her lost daughter, Lucy. (seasons 1-3) She is the secondary antagonist of the series.)
Miguel Vergara	Michael Angelo "Mico" M. Agoncillo	(Note: Irene and Jaime's son, Emily's older brother, Nathan's step brother, Domeng and Becca's grandson, Josie's biological grandson, and Conching's adoptive grandson. (seasons 1-3))
Kian Co	Renato "Nathan" S. Villadolid, Jr.	(Note: Natoy and Clara's son, Emily's older brother, Mico's step brother, Domeng and Becca's grandson, Josie's biological grandson, and Conching's grandson. (seasons 2-3))
Lito Pimentel	Dominador "Domeng" Magdangal	(Note: Irene's father, Josie's husband, Becca's current husband, Tope's adoptive/stepfather, Mico and Emily's grandfather, and Nathan's adoptive grandfather. (seasons 1-3))
Nadia Montenegro	Rebecca "Becca" Nieves-Magdangal	(Note: Domeng's common law-wife, Irene's adoptive/stepmother, Tope's mother, Mico and Emily's adoptive/step-grandmother, and Nathan's adoptive grandmother. (seasons 1-3))
Efren Reyes Jr.	Captain Nestor Samaniego	(Note: Clara's father, Jun's uncle/adoptive father, Nathan's grandfather. He is abusive to Clara but loves her with all his heart, later confronts Natoy in duel. He later dies after being squeezed by a machine. (seasons 1-3))
Ynez Veneracion	Josie Magdangal	(Note: Domeng's first wife, Irene's biological mother, and Mico and Emily's biological grandmother. She left Irene while she was young, later returns and asks forgiveness from Irene and Domeng. They then make peace. (seasons 1-2))
Dionne Monsanto	Lucia "Lucy" B. Villadolid	(Note: Conching's older daughter and second child who has "middle-child syndrome". Natoy and Emma's half-sister, Nathan and Emily's aunt, and Mico's adoptive aunt. Lucy is selfish and cunning. She is Clara's friend who makes Irene's life miserable, but later became enemies with Clara. It is later proven she is Mira's biological daughter. She has a fixation on Jaime. (seasons 1-3) She is the secondary villain of the series but later a primary protagonist.)
Dionne Monsanto	Angel Beltran	
Ingrid dela Paz	Emmanuelle "Emma" B. Villadolid	(Note: Conching's youngest child, Natoy's sister, and Lucy's half-sister, Mira's niece, Nathan and Emily's aunt, and Mico's adoptive aunt. She has an interest in Irene's step-brother Tope. (seasons 1-3))
Marco Gumabao	Christopher "Tope" Nieves-Magdangal	(Note: Irene's younger stepbrother, Domeng's stepson, Becca's son from her late husband, and Mico and Emily's step uncle. He likes Conching's youngest daughter Emma. (seasons 1-3))
Nina Medina	Tetay Beltran	(Note: Conching's sister figure who gives her advice. She is Natoy, Emma, and Lucy's mother figure during Conching absence and death. When Mira's returns she explains everything to the Villadolids. She is Perla's best friend. (seasons 1-3))
Archie Alemania	Reybong Villadolid	(Note: Natoy, Emma, and Lucy's cousin, Conching and Vicente's nephew, Nathan and Emily's uncle, and Mico's adoptive uncle. He treats Natoy more as a brother than a cousin. (seasons 1-3))
Rosario "Tart" Carlos	Deborah "Debbie" Espiritu	(Note: One of Irene's best friends and business partner for her party coordinating business named Happy Days. She is more serious than her other friend Tonette who is more comedic. She is Emily and Mico's godmother (seasons 1-3))
Jopay Paguia	Tonette Bernardo	(Note: Another one of Irene's best friends, who is comedic. She is dating Natoy's cousin, Reybong. She is Emily and Mico's godmother, and Irene's business partner in Happy Days. (seasons 1-3))
Miko Raval	Jun Samaniego	(Note: Clara's cousin/adoptive brother, Nestor's nephew, and Nathan's uncle, who is an accomplice in Clara and Nestor's schemes against the Villadolids. Later dies after being shot by the police. He had an interest in Emma. (seasons 1-3))
Cai Cortez	Sally	(Note: Clara's friend, who gets treated more of a sidekick or "pet" than a friend. She is the new owner of Happy Days when Clara bought it. Later betrayed Clara by calling the police on her. (seasons 1-3))
Mel Kimura	Yaya Perla	(Note: Nathan and Emily's nanny and Tetay's best friend. She is more comedic and less serious than Tetay who is more serious. She currently works as a nanny for the Villadolids. (seasons 2-3))
Luke Conde	Alvin	
Johan Santos	Bryan	(Note: Lucy's husband, Conching's son-in-law, and Natoy and Emma's brother-in-law who separated with her and harbors feelings for Irene. (season 1))
Kamille Filoteo		
Kyra Custodio		
Yana Asistio		
Micah Muñoz		
Gigi Locsin		
JC Santos	Noah	(Note: Jaime's friend who he borrowed money from. (season 2))
Divina Valencia		
Jenny Miller	Abigail	(Note: Natoy's ex-girlfriend who Conching wanted for him before she met Clara. (season 1))
AJ Dee	Matteo	
Barbara Perez	Delilah	(Note: Conching's friend. (season 1))
Ron Morales	Melchor	
Dante Ponce	Governor Salamanca	(Note: Nestor's boss who threatened his life along with Jun. He order's Nestor to do his dirty work, late the kidnapped him and Jun and threatened that he would kill Clara and Nathan. Later he and Melchor get killed by Nestor when they escape. (season 1-2))
Tanya Gomez	Azon	(Note: The former prison leader where Clara was sentenced. Later got killed by Clara's father Nestor during the prison breakout and escape. (season 3))
Special participation
Vivian Velez	Conchita "Conching" Beltran-Villadolid	(Note: The former main antagonist of the series. She is the mother of Natoy, Lucy, and Emma. Conchita is evil and manipulative like her adoptive daughter Lucy. She helps Clara making Irene's life miserable and believes Clara is the perfect fit for her son. She later died of the series. She has a villainous sister named Altamira.)
Victor Silayan	Jaime Agoncillo	(Note: Mico's biological father and Irene's former lover. He leaves Irene to stay married to his wife Nancy, who he eventually kills to go back to Irene. He later gets killed by Clara when he admits the truth to Irene that he is the father of Clara’s second child. (seasons 1-2))
Boboy Garrovillo	Vicente Villadolid	(Note: Conching's late husband, Natoy, Lucy, and Emma's father, and Mira's lover. (seasons 1-3) (flashbacks and pictures only))
Antoinette Taus	Nancy Agoncillo	(Note: Jaime's wife who got killed in a fire that Jaime plotted. She confronted Irene when she found out Jaime was cheating on her. (season 1))
Pamu Pamorada	Pilar Custodio	(Note: Clara's best friend who got murdered by Clara's father, Nestor. She encourages Clara to dress differently to get noticed especially with Natoy. (season 1))
Veyda Inoval	Young Irene	(Note: Young Irene grew up without her biological mother Josie, but she is happy with only her father raising and loving her. Later inherits a stepmother and stepbrother who she treats as her own family. (season 1))
Bugoy Cariño	Young Tope	(Note: Season 1)
Roland Lladoni	production cash disbursement officer	(Note: Extra (Season 1))

== Production ==
=== Casting changes ===
Ingrid dela Paz was originally part of the lead cast and was supposed to play role of Clara. However, ABS-CBN replaced her with actress and former Eat Bulaga! Dabarkads, Isabelle Daza and change her role.

Veteran actress Vivian Velez resigned from the Tubig at Langis citing difficulty working with series lead, Cristine Reyes. On several interviews, Velez stated that she has never been so humiliated and said "I do not want special treatment, but some respect." Reyes, during an interview with Boy Abunda, decided not to give further information about the controversy and keep quiet to avoid further problems. As such Velez's character, Conching, was written off the show in order to facilitate her exit. Velez's character was replaced by another veteran actress, Jean Saburit, who played Altamira Peterson, Conching's sister.

== Broadcast ==
=== Timeslot ===
On April 11, 2016, the series was placed at a later timeslot of 4:15 PM after It's Showtime was given an extension on its timeslot.

=== Finale ===
The series was supposed to end on September 9, 2016, as ABS-CBN made the announcement on August 22, 2016, that it was down to its last three weeks. Nevertheless, the series ended a week earlier than it should have, airing its finale on September 2, 2016.

=== Re-runs ===
The show began airing re-runs on Jeepney TV from September 11 to December 8, 2017 (replacing the re-runs of May Bukas Pa); December 22, 2018 to April 27, 2019 (replacing the re-runs of Annaliza); June 1 to September 18, 2020 (The rerun was abruptly cut weeks after its airing on ABS-CBN from April 13 to May 4, 2020 due to the temporary closure of ABS-CBN following the cease and desist order issued by the National Telecommunications Commission on account of its franchise expiration. Instead, it re-aired on Jeepney TV from the start, replacing Magandang Buhay.); February 26 to September 27, 2024 (also aired on ALLTV, replacing the re-runs of The Greatest Love); and May 10 to October 25, 2026 (replacing the re-runs of Bagani).

== Reception ==
KANTAR MEDIA NATIONAL TV RATINGS (3:30PM PST / 4:15PM PST)
PILOT EPISODE	FINALE EPISODE	PEAK	AVERAGE	SOURCE
13.7% (3:30PM PST)	21.6% (4:15PM PST)	21.6% (4:15PM PST); 21.1% (previous August 9, 2016)	18.9% (August 2016)	

=== Ratings ===
On May 17, 2016, Tubig at Langis received the highest TV rating of 18.1% with its episode, "Sukdulan", versus its rival program The Millionaire's Wife which only registered 10%. On July 15, 2016, The series beat its all-time high rating and registered 18.5% with its episode, "Pahamak", compared to Sa Piling ni Nanay which is the rival program who only got 10.8%. On July 29, 2016, The series once again beat its all-time high ratings and registered 19.4% with its episode, "Pag-Amin", compared to Sa Piling ni Nanay who only got 10.4%. On August 1, 2016, one episode ahead its all-time high rating, the series once again beat its all-time high rating and registered 19.8% with its episode, "Bunyag", compared to Sa Piling ni Nanay who only got 10.7%.

On August 8, 2016, Tubig at Langis beat its previous all-time high of 19.8%, and scored 20.1% with its episode, "Aresto", compared to its rival program, Sa Piling ni Nanay who only got a low rating of 9.7%. This set a new record as it entered the 20% territory. On August 9, 2016, after a day of its all-time high rating, the series once again beat its all-time high rating of 21.1% with its episode, "Bilanggo", compared to its rival show Sa Piling ni Nanay who only scored 10.8%.

On September 2, 2016, more viewers tuned in to the finale of the series, which recorded its all-time high national TV rating of 21.6% compared to Sa Piling ni Nanay that only got 12.3%.

== Accolades ==
Accolades received by Tubig At Langis
Year	Awards ceremony	Title	Result
2016	7th TV Series Craze Awards	Best Daytime TV Series	Won
2016	30th PMPC Star Awards for Television	Best Daytime Drama Series	Nominated

== See also ==
- List of programs broadcast by ABS-CBN
- List of ABS-CBN Studios original drama series
- List of programs broadcast by Jeepney TV
