= Vivian Velez =

Filipina actress (born 1960)

- Born: Vivian Zapata Rodriguez; May 21, 1960 (age 66); Cebu City, Philippines
- Other names: Ms. Body Beautiful; Conching (from Tubig at Langis); Malvina (from Maria Mercedes); Lucille (from Imortal)
- Occupation: Actress
- Known for: Maria Mercedes; Tubig at Langis
- Political party: Partido Demokratiko Pilipino

Vivian Zapata Rodriguez (born May 21, 1960), known professionally as Vivian Velez, is a Filipino actress who previously served as Director General of Film Academy of the Philippines. As one of the radio host of the 8TriMedia's weekly program called Double V and a DZRJ 810am's program called Chit Chat with Double V. She was known as the "Ms. Body Beautiful" of Philippine movies in the 1980s. She won the Film Academy of the Philippines FAP Award for Best Actress in Pieta (1983) and FAMAS Award and Metro Manila Film Festival for Best Actress in Paradise Inn (1985).

== Career ==
Vivian Velez started her career in show business in 1976 when she was only 16 years old. She won the Film Academy of the Philippines (FAP) Award for Best Actress for Pieta (1983) and won two Best Actress Awards for her 1985 film Paradise Inn; one from FAMAS Awards and another from the Metro Manila Film Festival.

She performed her own stunts in Ang Babaing Hinugot sa Aking Tadyang (1981), directed by Carlo J. Caparas. In 1983, she appeared in Pieta with Ace Vergel and Charito Solis. In 1985, she finished four movies: Paradise Inn with Michael de Mesa, Ben Tumbling with Lito Lapid, Order To Kill with the former President Joseph Estrada, and Riot 1950 with Rudy Fernandez.

Her notable film Ang Babaing Hinugot sa Aking Tadyang (1981) has been remade as a GMA-7 TV series, starring Marian Rivera. She starred in the 2010 TV series Imortal (starring John Lloyd Cruz and Angel Locsin), and in the 2013 TV remake of Maria Mercedes (starring Jessy Mendiola), both shown on ABS-CBN.

Velez has appeared in more than 60 movies and television shows.

Velez publicly announced in March 2016 through her Facebook account, that she has irrevocably resigned from her show, Tubig at Langis due to the alleged rudeness and humiliation by her co-star Cristine Reyes against Velez during several tapings of the drama series.

== Politics ==
Velez was known as a supporter of then-President Rodrigo Duterte since 2016, and she still supported him even after leaving power.

During the heights of the COVID-19 pandemic, she lashed out at then Vice-president Leni Robredo for a supposed political stunt, going as far as calling Mrs. Robredo, "boba" (stupid). This garnered backlash from people on the Internet, taunting her "betamax" celebrity sex tape from the 1980s.

She was also one of the personalities who pushed the Isko–Sara tandem in 2022, after she mainly supported then-Manila Mayor Isko Moreno's presidential campaign.

She took oath as member of Partido Demokratiko Pilipino in 2024. She was also appointed as one of the party's vice president. On January 13, 2025, she attended the National Rally for Peace organized by Iglesia ni Cristo at the Quirino Grandstand in Manila; although the event was staged in support of President Bongbong Marcos, Velez expressed to SMNI's Newsblast her desire for Marcos to resign.

== Awards and nominations ==
Year	Category	Award	Movie	Result
1982	Best Actress	FAMAS Award	Ang Babaing Hinugot sa Aking Tadyang (1981)	Nominated
1983	Best Actress	FAP Award	Pieta (1983)	Won
1985	Best Actress	FAMAS Award	Paradise Inn (1985)	Won
1985	Best Actress	MMFF	Paradise Inn (1985)	Won
1985	Best Actress	FAMAS Award	Pieta: Ikalawang Aklat (1984)	Nominated
1991	Best Actress	FAMAS Award	Kasalanan Bang Sambahin Ka? (1990)	Nominated
1991	Best Actress	Gawad Urian Award	Kasalanan Bang Sambahin Ka? (1990)	Nominated

== Selected filmography ==
=== Television ===
Year	Title	Role
1999–2001	Rio Del Mar	Bianca
2010–2011	Imortal	Lucille Zaragoza
2011	Maalaala Mo Kaya: Susi	(Mommy ni Louie)
2013	Misibis Bay	Miranda Cadiz
2013–2014	Maria Mercedes	Malvina Sancuevas
2016	Tubig at Langis	Conchita "Conching" Beltran-Villadolid†
2016	Encantadia	Carmen

=== Film ===
Year	Title	Role
(1974)	Black Mamba	
(1976)	Boss, Basta Ikaw (Wa 'Na 'Kong Sey)	
(1976)	Bata Pa si Sabel	
(1976)	Bago Lumamig ang Sabaw	
(1976)	*Bertong Suklob	
(1976)	Inday Garutay	
(1976)	Ligaw-tingin, Halik-hangin	Luding
(1976)	BongBong	Gilda
(1976)	Escolta: Mayo 13... Biyernes ng Hapon	
(1976)	Andalucia	
(1976)	Puwede Ako, Puwede Ka Pa Ba?	
(1977)	Mag-ingat Ka... Ikaw ang Susunod!	
(1977)	Valentin Labrador: Muntinlupa Riot May 26, 1950	
(1977)	Alas Tres ng Hapon... Lumuhod ang Maton!	
(1977)	Sila... sa Bawa't Bangketa	
(1977)	Mariposang Dagat	Mariposang Dagat
(1977)	Beerhouse	Carol
(1977)	Gameng	
(1977)	Babae... Ngayon at Kailanman	
(1978)	Blood Run	
(1978)	*Basta Kabit May Sabit	
(1978)	*Mula Ulo Hanggang Paa... Putik	
(1978)	*Sari-saring Ibong Kulasisi	
(1978)	*Batang City Jail	
(1978)	*Ex-Convict (Naligaw Na Landas)	
(1981)	*Ang Babaing Hinugot sa Aking Tadyang	Proserphine
(1981)	*Kahit Ako Ay Lupa	Mirriam
(1981)	*Ermitanyo	
(1983)	*Pieta	Marta
(1983)	*Kumusta ka Hudas	
(1984)	*Apoy sa Iyong Kandungan	Ramona
(1984)	*Sampung Ahas ni Eva	
(1985)	*Ben Tumbling	Daisy
(1985)	*Paradise Inn	Daria
(1990)	*Kasalanan Bang Sambahin Ka?	Catherine Posadas
(1990)	*Bikining Itim	Sally
(1991)	*Kailan Ka Magiging Akin	Adul de Jesus
(1993)	*Kill Zone	Waranya
(2011)	*Forever and a Day	Ellen
(2013)	*On the Job	Thelma

== Radio ==
- Double V (2017)
- Chit Chat with Double V (2021)
