= Maritoni Fernandez =

Filipino actor, model and businesswoman

Maritoni Fernandez-Dayrit
- Born: Antonita Maria Carmen Fernandez Moynihan; March 31, 1969 (age 57)
- Years active: 1989–2019
- Children: Lexi Fernandez

Maritoni Fernandez Moynihan-Dayrit (born Antonita Maria Carmen Fernandez Moynihan; March 31, 1969) is a Filipino former actress and entrepreneur.

== Family ==
Fernandez is the daughter of Antony Moynihan, 3rd Baron Moynihan, who was English with some Irish roots, and a Filipina mother. She is niece to Colin Moynihan, the current Baron Moynihan and former head of the British Olympic Association. She is the mother of actress Lexi Fernandez, who was a former GMA Network contract artist. On September 10, 2016, her sister, Maria Aurora Moynihan, was killed in the Philippines.

== Career ==
As an adult, Fernandez became a commercial model and actress in the Philippines, adopting the screen name Maritoni Fernandez. She has had considerable success as a screen actress, figuring in many movies with the respected Filipino actor Fernando Poe, Jr. and appearing in the award-winning Hong Kong film Days of Being Wild by acclaimed director Wong Kar-wai.

In 1993, Fernandez was linked to the Brunei beauties affair.

On her 30th birthday, Fernandez was diagnosed with breast cancer and has since undergone a lumpectomy in the United States. In remission, she has been serving as a spokesperson for breast cancer patients and survivors in the Philippines and abroad.

Fernandez is an owner of Herb-All Organic Trading Corporation, a food supplement company specializing in "young barley" powder and other natural health supplements. Simple Thoughts, her easy text floral service Bella Regalo, RSVP Event Planning and Design, and Just Desserts in addition to her jobs as commercial model and actress in television soap operas for a major Philippine television network. She resides with her children in Makati.

== Filmography ==
=== Film ===
Year	Title	Role
1989	Student Body	
1990	Hahamakin Lahat	
1990	Lovers' Delight	
1990	Days of Being Wild	Hotel maid
1991	Kidlat ng Maynila: Joe Pring 2	
1991	Takas sa Impierno	Katrina
1991	Capt. Jaylo: Batas sa Batas	
1991	Dadaan Ka sa Ibabaw ng Aking Bangkay	
1991	Buddy en Sol: Sine Ito!	
1991	Sumayaw Ka, Salome	
1991	Tukso, Layuan Mo Ako!	Nurse
1991	Disgrasyada	
1991	Anak ng Dagat	Kristina
1991	Markang Bungo: The Bobby Ortega Story	
1991	Dinampot Ka Lang sa Putik	
1991	Moro	Alma
1992	The Return of Long Ranger & Tonton: How the West Was Wrong	
1992	Padre Amante Guerrero	Vanessa Cristobal
1992	Claudia	Claudia
1992	Hiram Na Mukha	Morita
1992	Alyas Stella Magtanggol	Wendy
1992	Kapag Nabigo ang Batas	
1992	Working Students	Noemi
1993	Ayoko Na Sanang Magmahal	Debbie
1993	Gagay: Prinsesa ng Brownout	Brenda
1993	Lumuhod Ka sa Lupa	Doris
1993	Isa Lang ang Buhay Mo! Sgt. Bobby Aguilar	Leonor
1994	Multo in the City	Alice Buenavente
1995	Gayuma: Sana'y Mahalin Mo Rin Ako	
1995	Ang Syota Kong Balikbayan	Digna
1996	Dyesebel	Dyangga
1996	Ikaw ang Mahal Ko	Bianca Salazar
1997	Nang Iniwan Mo Ako	Diane
1997	Simaron, Barya Lang ang Halaga ng Ulo Mo	Sandra
1997	Gloria, Gloria Labandera	Betring
1997	Bridesmaids	Nina Patricio
2000	Ang Dalubhasa	Menchu
2003	You and Me Against the World	Celine Guerrero
2012	Sosy Problems	Dada
2017	Unexpectedly Yours	Rachelle

=== Television ===
Year	Title	Role	Notes
1993	Kapag May Katwiran, Ipaglaban Mo!		Episode: Talunan Ang Magwagi
1995	T.G.I.S.	Pia	Guest; Episode 4
1996–2002	Anna Karenina	Ruth Monteclaro	Supporting Cast / Antagonist
2003–2004	It Might Be You	Frida Montegracia-Trinidad	Supporting Cast / Antagonist
2006	Pinakamamahal	Marikrissa Padua	Supporting Cast / Antagonist
2006	Carlo J. Caparas' Bakekang	Elsa	Guest Cast
2008	Lobo	Dr. Vivian Lee	Extended Cast
2009	Sine Novela: Dapat Ka Bang Mahalin?	Donya Connie "Ms. Constance" Sanchez	Supporting Cast / Antagonist
2009–2010	Ikaw Sana	Loreta Reyes-Montemayor	Supporting Cast / Antagonist
2010	Langit sa Piling Mo	Gloria Hilario	Supporting Cast / Antagonist
2011	Elena M. Patron's Blusang Itim	Victoria Soriano	Extended Cast
2012	Legacy	Anna Marie Leviste	Supporting Cast / Anti-Hero
2012	A Beautiful Affair	Evelyn Saavedra	Special participation
2012–2013	Paroa: Ang Kuwento ni Mariposa	Belen Sarmiento	Supporting Cast / Antagonist
2013	Magpakailanman: Ligaw na Diyosa	Doctora	Episode role
2013–2014	Prinsesa ng Buhay Ko	Tess de Leon	Supporting role
2016	That's My Amboy	Alicia Ford	Supporting role
2016	Pepito Manaloto	Gigi	Episode Guest
2018	Victor Magtanggol	Alice Espiritu-Regalado	Supporting Cast
