= FLT Films =

Philippine film production company

FLT Films International
- Company type: Private
- Industry: Film production
- Founded: 1984
- Defunct: 2006
- Headquarters: Manila, Philippines
- Owner: Rose Flaminiano; Eduardo Flaminiano

FLT Films International was a Philippine film production company owned by Rose and Eduardo Flaminiano. FLT stands for Flaminiano, Loanzon and Ti.

== History ==
The film company was established in 1984 by couple Rose Loanzon-Flaminiano and Atty. Eduardo Flaminiano after selling their taxi franchise and restaurant. Goodtime Girls was its maiden movie. Similar to its competitor Seiko Films, it primarily focused on producing bold films. Among its notable bold films are Mga Lihim ng Kalapati (1987) and Burlesk Queen Ngayon (1999).

In 1989, FLT ventured into other genres. Among its notable films in various fields are comedy films Juan Tamad at Mister Shooli (1991), which won 6 awards at the 1991 Metro Manila Film Festival, and Swindler's List (1994); action films Anak ng Pasig (1993) and Tatak ng Kriminal (1993); biopic films Bingbong: The Vincent Crisologo Story (1991), Epimaco Velasco NBI (1994) and Chop-Chop Lady (1994). Bingbong marked the film company's shift to creating script and critique-conscious films.

FLT was responsible for reviving Robin Padilla's movie career. His first film under the film outlet was Anak, Pagsubok Lamang ng Diyos (1996), which was done while serving a 17-year jail term on illegal possession of firearms. It caught the attention of Viva Films, which sued Padilla for breach of contract, prompting the film's release to be delayed. In 1998, after receiving a conditional pardon from Pres. Fidel Ramos, he starred in Tulak ng Bibig, Kabig ng Dibdib, co-produced with Viva Films.

In 2003, after the release of You and Me Against the World, FLT became dormant with Rose Flaminiano focusing on real estate business. Three years later, it made its short-lived comeback with a Manny Pacquiao biopic Pacquiao: The Movie. With the film being a box office bomb, plans of a two-picture contract for Pacquiao didn't push through. Struggling with the film industry at that time, FLT stopped producing films indefinitely.

Viva Entertainment handles FLT Films' library, except for its films co-produced with Star Cinema.

== Filmography ==
- Goodtime Girls (1985)
- Hubo sa Dilim (1985)
- Amanda (1987)
- Takas sa Impierno (1991)
- Bingbong: The Vincent Crisologo Story (1991)
- Juan Tamad at Mister Shooli: Mongolian Barbecue (1991)
- Tatak ng Kriminal (1993)
- Secret Love (1994)
- Swindler's List (1994)
- Epimaco Velasco: NBI (1994)
- Anak, Pagsubok Lamang ng Diyos (1996)
- Kara... Kaakit-akit (1996)
- Adarna: The Mythical Bird (1997)
- Ako'y Ibigin Mo, Lalaking Matapang (1999)
- Senswal (2000)
- Tabi Tabi Po! (2001)
- Burles King Daw O... (2002)
- Mama San (2002)
- You and Me Against the World (2003)
- Pacquiao: The Movie (2006)

=== As distributor ===
- Alab ng Lahi (2003)
