= Recuerdo de Amor =

2001 Philippine television series

- Title card
- Genre: Drama; Romance; Action; Suspense; Crime; Mystery; Gothic Horror; Musical; Thriller
- Created by: ABS-CBN Studios
- Written by: Henry Quitain; Reggie Amigo; Dindo Perez
- Directed by: F.M. Reyes; Jerome Pobocan; Trina Dayrit
- Starring: Carmina Villarroel; Diether Ocampo
- Theme music composer: Homer Flores (music); Annabelle Regalado, Cory Vidanes, Lenlen Bravo, Maru Benitez and Cathy Perez (lyrics)
- Opening theme: "Recuerdo de Amor" by Jessa Zaragoza
- Country of origin: Philippines
- Original language: Filipino
- No. of episodes: 430

Production
- Executive producer: Lourdes M. De Guzman
- Editors: Sonny De Jesus; Roy Francia
- Running time: 15-30 minutes
- Production company: Star Creatives

Original release
- Network: ABS-CBN
- Release: May 14, 2001 – January 10, 2003

Recuerdo de Amor (International title: Memories of Love) is a Philippine television drama series broadcast by ABS-CBN. It aired on the network's Dramathon sa Hapon afternoon line up (later known in subsequent years as Hapontastic and Kapamilya Gold) and worldwide on TFC from May 14, 2001 to January 10, 2003, replacing Marinella and was replaced by Altagracia. Directed by F.M. Reyes, Jerome Pobocan and Trina Dayrit, it stars Carmina Villarroel and Diether Ocampo.

The TV series was delayed on May 14 to 15, 2001, and ended on its original end date worldwide on TFC because ABS-CBN broadcast the election coverage that day. The series also nominated Isabel Rivas for Best Actress in a Drama Series by the PMPC in 2002 alongside actress Pinky De Leon, who was also part of the series. The series was known to use fast-paced TV filmography in its 45-minute premiere of its pilot episode. It was also known for getting outstanding reviews throughout its run to Filipino viewers who have The Filipino Channel internationally because of its memorable storyline and visual effects similar to a U.S. soap opera.

The series was also Pinky de Leon's penultimate TV series before she decided to retire from TV and film work (her final series was Forever in My Heart, which was broadcast by ABS-CBN's rival, GMA Network). The afternoon series was also competing with dramas such as Pangako Sa ’Yo and GMA Network's soap opera Kung Mawawala Ka, which premiered in April 2002.

This series was streaming on Jeepney TV YouTube Channel.

== Premise ==
Recuerdo de Amor is an acclaimed afternoon television drama that chronicles on the complicated lives of Luisa (Carmina Villaroel) and Paulo (Diether Ocampo). Josefina and Antonio are happily in love raising their children. Antonio succumbs to the dying obsession of Greta Stuart (Isabel Rivas), a cunning haciendera who has a fixation for Antonio. Josefina in the other hand must suffer the tragic fate of her love for Antonio and for the sake of her children. Greta on the other hand succeeds at plans of winning all hope to have Josefina taken out of her plans. Paulo grows up with Greta and Antonio as a lackluster pretty boy while Luisa is a young servant to the household as she grows up she and Paulo are back in each other's arms 15 years later. Luisa suffers at the hands of the Villafuertes. Greta who knows the real identity of Luisa wants to get rid of Luisa from the scene. Meanwhile, Greta's son Monching a happy go lucky guy was obsessed to his ex gf Trina, Paulo's bestfriend. When Trina broke up with Monching, Monching thinks that Paulo was the reason Trina left him. Eventually Trina fell in love with Paulo while she was helping Paulo and Luisa in their wedding preparation, however days before the wedding Trina kissed Paulo that became the reason why Luisa decided not to invite Trina in their wedding. When Monching found out what Trina did he went to Trina's house and killed Valentina Romero, Trina's grandmother. Instead of Monching being imprisoned because of what he did to Valentina, it was Paulo who got accused and was sentenced to jail of killing Valentina. Years passed the truth came out, Paulo got acquitted Trina came back from the U.S., Monching was imprisoned but also got acquitted. Trina was still in love with Paulo became ruthless and evil, she did everything just to get Paulo from Luisa. She even pretended she had cancer, which eventually turned out to be true.

== Cast and characters ==
=== Main cast ===
- Diether Ocampo as Paulo Jose Villafuerte / Ariel Sebastian
- Carmina Villarroel as Luisa Arellano / Rebecca Stuart

=== Supporting cast ===
- Isabel Rivas as Greta Stuart-Villafuerte (Main Antagonist) †
- Pinky de Leon as Josephina "Josie" Sebastian
- Dante Rivero as Antonio Sebastian / Enrico Villafuerte
- Gladys Reyes as Maningning Muerto / Leila (Antagonist)
- Tin Arnaldo as Trina Romero † (Antagonist)
- Carlos Morales as Monching S. Villafuerte (Antagonist)
- Gloria Sevilla† as Doña Conchita La Fuente
- Perla Bautista as Carlotta / Ninang † (Antagonist)
- Gandong Cervantes as Fernando Pascual † (Antagonist)
- Baron Geisler as Francis Sebastian
- Angel Aquino as Sister Cecilia Sebastian
- Angelene Aguilar as Margarita Dumagat †
- Sylvia Sanchez as Beatrice Auble †
- Niña de Sagun as Mai-Mai Arellano †

=== Recurring cast ===
- Jennifer Sevilla as Janice / Lourdes
- Jhoana Marie Tan as Sheryl Villafuerte †
- Mon Confiado as Alberto
- Bembol Roco as Ward
- Gilleth Sandico as Lovella
- Cris Villanueva as Stanley Liu † (Antagonist)
- Zoren Legaspi as Eugene Hernando † (Antagonist)
- Andre Tiangco as Dindo
- Meg Reyes as Rosanna "Anna" Lagman † and Bianca Agoncillo
- Moreen Guese as Roselle
- Crispin Pineda as Reden
- Drinnie Aguilar as Catherine Villafuerte
- Lui Villaruz as Miloy
- Aurora Halili as Yvette / Janice
- Lovely Rivero as Diana
- Rey Sagum as Domeng
- Nico Garcia as Caloy
- Tess Dumpit as Choleng Muerto
- Julio Pacheco as Nonoy
- Ricky Rivero as Jezebel
- Rina Reyes as Elbertina
- Liz Alindogan as Dolor Resureccion / Atty. Maris Marquez
- Menggie Cobarrubias as Atty. Montinola
- Odette Khan as Nena
- Jennifer Illustre as Teresa Agoncillo
- Connie Chua as Tiyang Arcadia
- Gerald Madrid as Lance Velez
- Justin Cuyugan as Samuel
- Eloy de Guzman as Wally
- Mia Guterrez as Fake Dolor
- Froilan Sales as Elias
- Joe Gruta as Berto
- Alex Del Rosario as Dave
- Mari as Gerry
- Nicole Yabut as Yvonne
- Raquel Monteza as Mrs. Ilustre

=== Special participation ===
- Yuuki Kadooka as Young Ariel Sebastian
- Angel Gonzales as Young Cecilia Sebastian
- John Manalo as Young Monching Villafuerte
- Alwyn Uytingco as teen Monching Villafuerte
- Emman Abeleda as Young Paulo Jose Villafuerte
- Empress Schuck as Young Luisa Arellano
- King Alcala as Young Francis
- Dimples Romana as Young Josephina
- Karlyn Bayot as Young Greta

== See also ==
- List of programs broadcast by ABS-CBN
- List of ABS-CBN Studios original drama series
