= Gagay: Prinsesa ng Brownout =

Philippine comedy film

- Directed by: Bey Vito
- Screenplay by: Dan Salamante
- Story by: Pablo S. Gomez
- Produced by: William Leary
- Starring: Gelli de Belen
- Cinematography: Ding Austria
- Edited by: Renato de Leon; Efren Salumbides
- Music by: Ricky del Rosario
- Production company: Viva Films
- Distributed by: Viva Films
- Release date: June 24, 1993
- Running time: 112 minutes
- Country: Philippines
- Language: Filipino

Gagay: Prinsesa ng Brownout (Filipino: "Gagay: Princess of Brownout") is a 1993 Filipino comedy film directed by Bey Vito in his theatrical directorial debut. The film stars Gelli de Belen in the title role. It was one of the entries in the 1993 Manila Film Festival. It also marks the film debut of Charina Scott and Raffy Rodriguez.

The film is streaming online on YouTube.

== Plot ==
When they were younger, Timang and Leon had a secret relationship but broke up soon after Leon was bethroted to marry someone else. Heartbroken, Timang marries Roderick, an overly shy guy who gave her five children: John, Paul, George, Ringga/Gagay and Madonna. Years later, Roderick had died while Timang and her five children were living in poverty.

Gagay and her three siblings try to keep the family afloat by selling charcoal but would always be subject to extortion by Aling Huling and her two children, Brando and Brenda. At the same time, Leon, Timang's ex-boyfriend came home to settle with his son Raul for good. Now a widower but a rich man, Leon runs a generator company which Raul manages. Brenda gets attracted to Raul and his money but Raul gets attracted to Gagay instead for her pure heart. The mutual attraction between Raul and Gagay gets a firm disapproval from Leon. Timang on the other hand vaguely approves but tells Gagay to follow her heart and be careful of Raul's intentions.

Paul, John and George later on unveiled their invention, a generator ran only by charcoal. But it initially failed because all the sacks of charcoal had been in the possession of Aling Huling. Seeking desperate measures, Gagay and her siblings resort to stealing back the sacks of charcoal. On the day of the generator's launch, it garnered a lot of positive reviews from their neighbors and foreign dignitaries that went. Don Leon attempted to invest in the new innovation but Timang and her children disapproved since he was a direct competitor. The charcoal-operated generator was a blessing to Aling Timang's family and they were able to get rich and purchased all the material things that they could buy, including a mansion. On the other hand, Raul and Don Leon's generator company closes due to bankruptcy. This development made Don Leon feel bad that later on he gets sick.

Not wanting to lose in a fair battle, Aling Huling gets the blessing of Don Leon to see him and sets up Brenda to seduce Raul away from Gagay. Brando on the other hand, pretends to befriend Raul in the hopes of giving him the best advice to marry his sister instead. When Don Leon had to be hospitalized, Raul asks Brando for a favor to ask Gagay for money since they are deep in debt. Brando was able to get Gagay's money only to squander it for his own dealings with Junior Elvis. A miscommunication resulted when Raul does not get Gagay's money and insults her for leaving him when he needed her most. Dejected, Raul decides to ask Brenda out for a drink and they end together in bed. Aling Huling pressures Don Leon for Raul to marry her daughter or else they will create a scandal. Brando and his henchmen kidnap Gagay but was later on apprehended after Gagay shows up to stop Raul and Brenda's wedding in time. Eventually, Raul and Gagay were married, much to everyone's delight.

== Cast ==
- Gelli de Belen as Gagay / Ringga
- Janno Gibbs as John
- Anjo Yllana as Paul
- Rustom Padilla as Raul
- Raffy Rodriguez as George
- Maritoni Fernandez as Brenda
- Tessie Tomas as Aling Timang
- Jaime Garchitorena as Brando
- Zeny Zabala as Aling Huling
- Leo Martinez as Don Leon
- Jinky Oda as Jezebel
- Charina Scott as Madonna
- Archi Adamos as Junior Elvis
- Moody Diaz as Aling Iska
- Kuya Cesar as Priest
- Errol Dionisio as Hepe
- Lou Veloso as Roderick
- Lady Guy as Ate Guy
- Bobby Henson as Kuya Ronnie
- Tita Pambid as Lucring
- Marie Barbacui as Mare
- Myra Cuesta as Lilibeth

=== Cameo appearances ===
- Raymart Santiago
- Janice De Belen
- Keempee de Leon
- Robin Padilla
