= Secret Love (1994 film) =

Philippine drama film

- Directed by: Edgardo "Boy" Vinarao
- Written by: Baby Nebrida
- Produced by: Rose Flaminiano
- Starring: Geneva Cruz; Jomari Yllana
- Cinematography: Romy Vitug
- Edited by: Edgardo "Boy" Vinarao
- Music by: Nonong Buencamino
- Production company: FLT Films
- Distributed by: FLT Films
- Release date: March 23, 1994
- Running time: 90 minutes
- Country: Philippines
- Language: Filipino

Secret Love is a 1994 Filipino drama film edited and directed by Edgardo "Boy" Vinarao. The film stars Geneva Cruz and Jomari Yllana.

== Synopsis ==
Cousins Carmina and Jodi reunite at a party with their respective families upon the return of Carmina's family from the US. Unknown to them, their affection towards each other would blossom into a romance against their family and friends' wishes simply because they are blood-related.

Soon after, a family secret would slowly unravel which would change the course of the forbidden lovers' relationship. Will this allow Carmina and Jodi to continue with their romance? Or will it drift them further apart?

== Cast ==
- Geneva Cruz as Carmina
- Jomari Yllana as Jodi
- Eddie Gutierrez as Ronald
- Elizabeth Oropesa as Sonia
- Juan Rodrigo as Romy
- Carol Dauden as Mila
- Dennis Roldan as Efren
- Beth Tamayo as Gina
- Luigi Alvarez as Albert
- Bernard Atienza as Albert's Father
- Universal Motion Dancers as themselves
