= Isabel Rivas =

Filipino actress and businesswoman (born 1958)

- Born: Marilou Yap Gumabao; December 20, 1958 (age 67); Manila, Philippines
- Occupations: Actress and businesswoman
- Years active: 1980–present
- Relatives: Dennis Roldan (brother); Michele Gumabao (niece); Marco Gumabao (nephew); Melissa Mendez (cousin); Glenda Garcia (cousin); Gretchen Fullido (niece); Nadine Samonte (daughter-in-law)

Marilou Yap Gumabao (Tagalog pronunciation: [guˈmɐbaʊ]; born December 20, 1958), professionally known as Isabel Rivas (Tagalog pronunciation: [ˈɾɪbɐs]) is a Filipino actress and businesswoman. She is the younger sister of former actor Dennis Roldan. In 1995 Rivas starred in a Primetime soap Villa Quintana as Stella Quintana A main cast member and villain of the series. In 1999 she joined ABS-CBN’s week day soap opera Saan Ka Man Naroroon as a Antagonist. In 2002 she starred in her first daytime television series Recuerdo De Amor as the main antagonist. She would accept more roles notable are Kahit Isang Saglit in 2008. 2011 Pahiram Kahit Sandali and 2018’s Los Bastardos TV Adaptation and notably her hillarious work in First Lady

== Career ==
She was introduced as a sexy nymphet in Celso Ad. Castillo's steamy movie, Uhaw Na Dagat (1980). She appeared movies such as Burgis (1981), Kung Mahawi Man Ang Ulap (1984), Ang Bukas Ay Akin (1989), Barumbado (1990), Alyas Baby Face (1990), and Dahil Mahal Na Mahal Kita (1998).

In 1995 Rivas was a regular in the GMA Telenovela Villa Quintana for which she received a Best Actress Nomination

In 1999 she was cast in ABS-CBN's Primetime Drama Saan Ka Man Naroroon, the critically acclaimed drama that ran for two years. She starred as a lead antagonist on the show. She was reunited with her co-star Rico Yan who was in the film Dahil Mahal Na Mahal Kita in 1998.

Rivas appeared in 2001 TV series Recuerdo de Amor, aired in ABS-CBN, starring Diether Ocampo and Carmina Villarroel and Kahit Isang Saglit with Jericho Rosales and Malaysian actress Carmen Soo.

She won the 1996 Star Awards for Television Best Drama Actress in Villa Quintana and she also nominated for Best Actress in a Drama Series by the PMPC in 2002 for Recuerdo de Amor.

On television, she joined the cast of Tepok Bunot (1981–82) a daily sitcom over Maharlika Broadcasting System – Channel 4 as the colegiala-speaking friend of Roderick Paulate and Bibeth Orteza.

In 2018, she returned to showbiz via ABS-CBN's series Los Bastardos.

In November 2019, she made a comeback in GMA-7 to star in the television series with Nora Aunor in Bilangin ang Bituin sa Langit based on the movie of the same title. She was previously seen on the network during 2012–2013 via Pahiram ng Sandali.

== Personal life ==
She manages and owns a farm in Iba, Zambales, Philippines.

== Filmography ==
=== Selected movies ===
- 9 De Pebrero (1979)
- Kambal sa Uma (1979)
- Uhaw Na Dagat (1981)
- Akin Ang Paghihiganti (1982)
- Aninong Bakal (1983)
- The Fighting Mayor(1983)
- Kung Mahawi Man Ang Ulap - Chona Acuesta (1984)
- Heartache City (1985)
- Macho Gigolo (1986)
- Hari sa Hari, Lahi sa Lahi (1987)
- Ang Bukas Ay Akin (1989)
- Barumbado (1990)
- Beautiful Girl (1990)
- Maricris Sioson: Japayuki (1993)
- Pare Ko (1995)
- Istokwa (1996)
- Dahil Mahal Na Mahal Kita - Suzanne Quirino (1998)

=== Television ===
Year	Title	Role
1981–82	Tepok Bunot	—
1995–97	Villa Quintana	Stella Quintana
1997	Wansapanataym: Salamin	—
1999–2000	Saan Ka Man Naroroon	Marilou
2001–03	Recuerdo de Amor	Greta Stuart-Villafuerte
2008	Kahit Isang Saglit	Vivian Mondragon
2010	Claudine Presents: Alzheimer's	Guest
2011	Guns and Roses	Patricia "Patria" Santana
2011	Wansapanataym: Christmas Caroline	Chona
2012	Wansapanataym: Incredibelle	Cory
2012–13	Pahiram ng Sandali	Diana Gomez
2013	Apoy sa Dagat	Young Idelfonsa Del Sol
2013	Kidlat	Dulce
2018–19	Precious Hearts Romances Presents: Los Bastardos	Alba Santillan
2019	Ipaglaban Mo: Utang	Chayong
2020–21	Bilangin ang Bituin sa Langit	Doña Martina Santos
2022	First Lady	Senator Allegra Trinidad
2022–23	Mano Po Legacy: The Flower Sisters	Senator Aurora Ty-Chua
