= Dennis Roldan =

Filipino actor, basketball player, politician and businessman

Member of the Philippine House of Representatives from Quezon City's 3rd congressional district
- In office June 30, 1992 – June 30, 1995
- Preceded by: Nikki Coseteng
- Succeeded by: Mike Defensor

Member of the Quezon City Council from the 3rd district
- In office February 2, 1988 – June 30, 1992

Personal details
- Born: Mitchell Yap Gumabao; 8 December 1956 (age 69) Manila, Philippines
- Party: LDP
- Height: 6 ft 0 in (1.83 m)
- Spouse: Loli Imperial
- Relations: Isabel Rivas (sister)
- Children: 8 including Michele (daughter), Marco (son) and Paolo (son)
- Education: Trinity College of Quezon City
- Occupation: Actor; basketball player; politician; businessman
- Basketball career

Career information
- College: Trinity College
- Playing career: 1983–1983

Career history
- 1983: Gilbey's Gin Gimlets

Other information
- Criminal information
- Conviction: Kidnapping
- Penalty: Reclusión perpetua without parole (maximum of 40 years)

Details
- Imprisoned at: New Bilibid Prison

Mitchell Yap Gumabao Sr. (Tagalog pronunciation: [guˈmɐbaʊ]; born 8 December 1956), better known as Dennis Roldan, is a Filipino former actor, basketball player, businessman, politician, and convicted kidnapper.

== Career ==
=== Basketball ===
Before entering show business, he was a basketball player for Trinity College prior to being drafted to play for a short time with the Philippine Basketball Association's (PBA) Ginebra team and 1983 Gilbey's Gin Gimlets season team.

=== Film ===
He later appeared in the film Kambal Sa Uma in 1979, Salome in 1981 and Paradise Inn in 1985. He won an award at the Metro Manila Film Festival for Best Supporting Actor in the movie Hot Property in 1983. In the same year, Roldan portrayed a kidnapper in the box office bomb action film, Terrorist Hunter starring Eddie Garcia.

=== Politics ===
He was elected Quezon City councilor in 1988, and was elected Congressman from 1992 to 1995 in the 3rd District of Quezon City. He ran for a second term in 1995 but lost to Mike Defensor.

== Personal life ==
Roldan is a Filipino of Chinese and Spanish ancestry. He is the older brother of actress Isabel Rivas. He is the father of actor Marco Gumabao and volleyball player Michele Gumabao. Roldan revealed that he made a "covenant" with God as a result of prison-based Bible studies and fellowship seminars. He has since become a born-again Christian. He has been a pastor of Jesus Christ the Life Giver Ministry, which is based in Quezon City.

=== Kidnapping conviction ===
On August 26, 2014, the Pasig Regional Trial Court found Roldan and two other persons guilty of kidnapping a Chinese-Filipino boy back in 2005. Following his arrest, Roldan's character in romance drama My Destiny was depicted to be killed off. He is currently serving a life sentence.

== Filmography ==
=== Film ===
Year	Title	Role	Note(s)	Ref(s).
1979	Kambal sa Uma			
1980	Palawan			
1980	Goriong Butete			
1980	Chicks			
1980	Ito ang Babae			
1980	Totoy Boogie			
1980	Sexy Dancers			
1981	Uhaw Na Dagat			
1981	Bakit Bughaw ang Langit?			
1981	Kontrobersyal			
1981	Salome			
1983	Exploitation			
1983	Kirot			
1983	Hot Property			
1984	Akin ang Iyong Katawan			
1984	Hindi Mo Akong Kayang Tapakan			
1984	Puri			
1984	Mahilig			
1985	Paradise Inn			
1986	Hiram Na Katawan			
1986	Ang Daigdig Ay Isang Butil Na Luha			
1987	Mamaw			
1988	Love Letters			
1990	Dyesebel	Dennis		
1990	Hahamakin Lahat			
1991	Markang Bungo: The Bobby Ortega Story			
1991	Takas sa Impierno	Edmund		
1992	Manong Gang			
1992	Basagulero			
1993	Padre Amante Guerrero			
1994	Mayor Cesar Climaco			
1994	Secret Love	Efren		
1994	Separada	Arman		
1995	Matimbang Pa sa Dugo			
1995	Hanggang sa Huling Bala	Richard		
1996	Ganti ng Puso	Col. Maramba		
1996	Suicide Rangers			
1996	Sa Kamay ng Batas			
1996	Medrano			
1996	Bilang Na ang Araw Mo	Rodel		
1996	Akin ang Puri			
1996	Hangga't May Hininga	Acosta		
1997	Pusakal			
1997	Ligaw Na Bala: Lt. Alexander Lademor			
1997	Iskalawag: Ang Batas Ay Batas			
1997	Ayos Lang, Pare Ko			
2005	Terrorist Hunter	Malik		
2013	10,000 Hours			
2019	Bato: The General Ronald dela Rosa Story	An NPA leader		

=== Television ===
Year	Title	Role	Notes
1999–2001	Rio Del Mar	Miguel Bautista	Guest role
1999–2002	Ang Munting Paraiso	Doc Mendez	Guest role
1999–2001	Saan Ka Man Naroroon	Greg	Recurring role
2001–2003	Sa Dulo ng Walang Hanggan	Dr. Anton dela Cruz	Extended role
2001–2003	Sana ay Ikaw na Nga	Amadeus	Recurring role
2014	My Destiny	Mateo Andrada	Supporting role
2014	Wagas: The Flora & Harry Gasser Love Story	Harry Gasser	Episode role

House of Representatives of the Philippines
Preceded by Nikki Coseteng	Member of the House of Representatives from Quezon City's 3rd district 1992–1995	Succeeded by Mike Defensor
