= List of Tubig at Langis episodes =

Tubig at Langis (lit. 'Water and Oil' / English: Broken Vows) is a 2016 Philippine drama television series directed by FM Reyes. The series is starred by Cristine Reyes, Zanjoe Marudo, and Isabelle Daza and premiered on ABS-CBN's Kapamilya Gold afternoon block and worldwide on The Filipino Channel on February 1 to September 2, 2016, replacing All of Me.

The show ended on September 2, 2016, concluding the first to third season with 151 episodes.

== Series overview ==
Season	Episodes	Originally released	
Season	Episodes	First released	Last released
1	72	February 1, 2016	May 13, 2016
2	69	May 16, 2016	August 19, 2016
3	10	August 22, 2016	September 2, 2016

== Episode list ==
=== Season 1 ===
No. overall	No. in season	Title	Hashtag	Original air date	Kantar Media Rating (nationwide)
1	1	Ang Simula	#TALangsimula	February 1, 2016	13.7%
2	2	First Love	#TALfirstlove	February 2, 2016	12.5%
3	3	Tiwala	#TALtiwala	February 3, 2016	12.4%
4	4	Proposal	#TALproposal	February 4, 2016	12.0%
5	5	Pagsusok	#TALpagsubok	February 5, 2016	11.9%
6	6	Paghaharap	#TALpaghaharap	February 8, 2016	12.8%
7	7	Pamamanhikan	#TALpamamanhikan	February 9, 2016	13.4%
8	8	Kasal	#TALkasal	February 10, 2016	11.8%
9	9	Sorpresa	#TALsorpresa	February 11, 2016	12.6%
10	10	Pagtatagpo	#TALpagtatagpo	February 12, 2016	12.7%
11	11	Segunda Mano	#TALsegundamano	February 15, 2016	12.6%
12	12	Duda	#TALduda	February 16, 2016	12.8%
13	13	Panganib	#TALpanganib	February 17, 2016	12.5%
14	14	Sabwatan	#TALsabwatan	February 18, 2016	12.9%
15	15	Sulsol	#TALsulsol	February 19, 2016	13.3%
16	16	Tukso	#TALtukso	February 22, 2016	13.1%
17	17	Ang Pagbabalik	#TALpagbabalik	February 23, 2016	13.9%
18	18	Pagwasak	#TALpagwasak	February 24, 2016	12.2%
19	19	Pagtataksil	#TALpagtataksil	February 25, 2016	14.5%
20	20	Konsensya	#TALkonsensya	February 26, 2016	12.1%
21	21	Lihim	#TALlihim	February 29, 2016	12.4%
22	22	Pagbubuntis	#TALpagbubuntis	March 1, 2016	13.3%
23	23	Imbitasyon	#TALimbitasyon	March 2, 2016	12.6%
24	24	Paghaharap	#TALpaghaharap	March 3, 2016	12.5%
25	25	Tensyon	#TALtensyon	March 4, 2016	13.0%
26	26	Kasalo	#TALkasalo	March 7, 2016	13.0%
27	27	Galit	#TALgalit	March 8, 2016	13.8%
28	28	Pagtakas	#TALPagtakas	March 9, 2016	14.4%
29	29	Pagtitiis	#TALPagtitiis	March 10, 2016	14.2%
30	30	Taguan	#TALtaguan	March 11, 2016	14.2%
31	31	Panaginip	#TALpanaginip	March 14, 2016	14.3%
32	32	Sugod	#TALsugod	March 15, 2016	13.9%
33	33	Kaguluhan	#TALkaguluhan	March 16, 2016	13.7%
34	34	Desperado	#TALdesperado	March 17, 2016	13.5%
35	35	Inggit	#TALinggit	March 18, 2016	13.1%
36	36	Takot	#TALtakot	March 21, 2016	14.2%
37	37	Rebelasyon	#TALrebelasyon	March 22, 2016	13.9%
38	38	Kumplikasyon	#TALkumplikasyon	March 23, 2016	14.9%
39	39	Bisto	#TALbisto	March 28, 2016	15.2%
40	40	Pagdurog	#TALpagdurog	March 29, 2016	16.0%
41	41	Paalam	#TALpaalam	March 30, 2016	15.0%
42	42	Suyo	#TALsuyo	March 31, 2016	15.4%
43	43	Palaban	#TALpalaban	April 1, 2016	15.1%
44	44	Kapalit	#TALkapalit	April 4, 2016	16.4%
45	45	Pagluluksa	#TALpagluluksa	April 5, 2016	16.3%
46	46	Poot	#TALpoot	April 6, 2016	16.7%
47	47	Kundisyon	#TALkundisyon	April 7, 2016	15.8%
48	48	Hadlang	#TALhadlang	April 8, 2016	14.5%
49	49	Demanda	#TALdemanda	April 11, 2016	14.9%
50	50	Katapat	#TALkatapat	April 12, 2016	17.1%
51	51	Katotohanan	#TALkatotohanan	April 13, 2016	16.7%
52	52	Hustisya	#TALhustisya	April 14, 2016	14.9%
53	53	Bisita	#TALbisita	April 15, 2016	15.5%
54	54	Tanan	#TALtanan	April 18, 2016	15.7%
55	55	Muli	#TALmuli	April 19, 2016	16.2%
56	56	Tanggap	#TALtanggap	April 20, 2016	15.1%
57	57	Tahanan	#TALtahanan	April 21, 2016	14.5%
58	58	Selos	#TALselos	April 22, 2016	14.7%
59	59	Obsesyon	#TALobsesyon	April 25, 2016	15.3%
60	60	Pagsilang	#TALpagsilang	April 26, 2016	14.6%
61	61	Pagkilala	#TALpagkilala	April 27, 2016	14.7%
62	62	Pabor	#TALpabor	April 28, 2016	14.1%
63	63	Hinanakit	#TALhinanakit	April 29, 2016	13.9%
64	64	Kahati	#TALkahati	May 2, 2016	14.6%
65	65	Pangamba	#TALpangamba	May 3, 2016	15.2%
66	66	Pagbawi	#TALpagbawi	May 4, 2016	16.4%
67	67	Paglayas	#TALpaglayas	May 5, 2016	15.2%
68	68	Bwelta	#TALbwelta	May 6, 2016	15.0%
69	69	Sadya	#TALsadya	May 9, 2016	14.4%
70	70	Paghahanda	#TALpaghahanda	May 10, 2016	15.4%
71	71	Sorpresa	#TALsorpresa	May 11, 2016	16.8%
72	72	Banta	#TALbanta	May 12, 2016	15.1%
73	73	Plano	#TALplano	May 13, 2016	17.1%

=== Season 2 ===
No. overall	No. in season	Title	Hashtag	Original air date	Kantar Media Rating (nationwide)
74	1	Sukdulan	#TALsukdulan	May 16, 2016	18.1%
75	2	Siping	#TALsiping	May 17, 2016	17.1%
76	3	Ebidensya	#TALebidensya	May 18, 2016	17.3%
77	4	Hibang	#TALhibang	May 19, 2016	16.6%
78	5	Sagad	#TALsagad	May 20, 2016	18.0%
79	6	Desperada	#TALdesperada	May 23, 2016	17.0%
80	7	Angkin	#TALangkin	May 24, 2016	14.8%
81	8	Karapatan	#TALkarapatan	May 25, 2016	16.2%
82	9	Areglo	#TALareglo	May 26, 2016	14.4%
83	10	Imoral	#TALimoral	May 27, 2016	16.1%
84	11	Panggap	#TALpanggap	May 30, 2016	16.1%
85	12	Paniwala	#TALpaniwala	May 31, 2016	
86	13	Paraan	#TALparaan	June 1, 2016	14.3%
87	14	Dagok	#TALdagok	June 2, 2016	13.9%
88	15	Bunga	#TALbunga	June 3, 2016	13.8%
89	16	Lugmok	#TALlugmok	June 6, 2016	15.3%
90	17	Hangganan	#TALhangganan	June 7, 2016	15.8%
91	18	Hiwalay	#TALhiwalay	June 8, 2016	17.3%
92	19	Panganib	#TALpanganib	June 9, 2016	16.2%
93	20	Pagitan	#TALpagitan	June 13, 2016	14.7%
94	21	Sabwatan	#TALsabwatan	June 14, 2016	15.4%
95	22	Paglayo	#TALPaglayo	June 15, 2016	14.8%
96	23	Pagbangon	#TALPagbangon	June 16, 2016	14.4%
97	24	Siklab	#TALSiklab	June 17, 2016	14.2%
98	25	Parusa	#TALparusa	June 20, 2016	14.4%
99	26	Pagtago	#TALpagtago	June 21, 2016	15.7%
100	27	Gulo	#TALgulo	June 22, 2016	14.6%
101	28	Pagkakataon	#TALpagkakataon	June 23, 2016	16.0%
102	29	Tapatan	#TALtapatan	June 24, 2016	15.3%
103	30	Banta	#TALbanta	June 27, 2016	17.0%
104	31	Pruweba	#TALpruweba	June 28, 2016	15.9%
105	32	Pandaraya	#TALpandaraya	June 29, 2016	14.5%
106	33	Pagbunyag	#TALpagbunyag	June 30, 2016	16.0%
107	34	Siwalat	#TALsiwalat	July 1, 2016	15.7%
108	35	Katuparan	#TALkatuparan	July 4, 2016	16.5%
109	36	Tatag	#TALtatag	July 5, 2016	16.0%
110	37	Harapan	#TALharapan	July 6, 2016	17.6%
111	38	Pagguho	#TALpagguho	July 7, 2016	18.3%
112	39	Paalam, Irene	#TALpaalamirene	July 8, 2016	17.3%
113	40	Pagligtas	#TALpagligtas	July 11, 2016	18.0%
114	41	Blackmail	#TALblackmail	July 12, 2016	16.7%
115	42	Bigo	#TALbigo	July 13, 2016	17.6%
116	43	Sidhi	#TALsidhi	July 14, 2016	16.8%
117	44	Pahamak	#TALpahamak	July 15, 2016	18.5%
118	45	Agaw Buhay	#TALagawbuhay	July 18, 2016	17.9%
119	46	Coma	#TALcoma	July 19, 2016	17.2%
120	47	Sumbat	#TALsumbat	July 20, 2016	18.4%
121	48	Pag-asa	#TALpagasa	July 21, 2016	17.2%
122	49	Bawi	#TALbawi	July 22, 2016	17.4%
123	50	Lantad	#TALlantad	July 25, 2016	16.4%
124	51	Pagpapatawad	#TALpagpapatawad	July 26, 2016	17.0%
125	52	Kidnap	#TALkidnap	July 27, 2016	17.3%
126	53	Pag-amin	#TALpagamin	July 28, 2016	19.4%
127	54	Bunyag	#TALbunyag	July 29, 2016	19.8%
128	55	Patawad	#TALpatawad	August 1, 2016	17.8%
129	56	Pugante	#TALpugante	August 2, 2016	18.1%
130	57	Paggising	#TALpaggising	August 3, 2016	18.5%
131	58	Higanti	#TALhiganti	August 4, 2016	18.9%
132	59	Aresto	#TALaresto	August 5, 2016	20.1%
133	60	Bilanggo	#TALbilanggo	August 8, 2016	21.1%
134	61	Reyna	#TALreyna	August 9, 2016	18.4%
135	62	Sorpresa	#TALsorpresa	August 10, 2016	17.2%
136	63	Prinsesa	#TALprinsesa	August 11, 2016	19.2%
137	64	Takas	#TALtakas	August 12, 2016	18.5%
138	65	Asinta	#TALasinta	August 15, 2016	16.4%
139	66	Solid	#TALsolid	August 16, 2016	16.8%
140	67	Sakripisyo	#TALsakripisyo	August 17, 2016	15.5%
141	68	Dukot	#TALdukot	August 18, 2016	17.5%

=== Season 3: Ang Pagtatapos ===
==== Ang Ending na Hindi mo Dapat Dedmahin ====
No. overall	No. in season	Title	Hashtag	Original air date	Kantar Media Rating (nationwide)
142	1	Ligtas	#TALligtas	August 22, 2016	18.5%
143	2	Lusob	#TALlusob	August 23, 2016	16.9%
144	3	Binyag	#TALbinyag	August 24, 2016	17.8%
145	4	Hangarin	#TALhangarin	August 25, 2016	16.9%
146	5	Preparasyon	#TALpreparasyon	August 26, 2016	16.5%
147	6	Pasabog	#TALpasabog	August 29, 2016	18.6%
148	7	Kaligtasan	#TALkaligtasan	August 30, 2016	17.8%
149	8	Pagtutuos	#TALpagtutuos	August 31, 2016	17.3%
150	9	Dahas	#TALdahas	September 1, 2016	17.5%
151	10	Huling Pak	#TALhulingpak	September 2, 2016	21.6%
