= Bato (The General Ronald dela Rosa Story) =

- Theatrical release poster
- Directed by: Adolfo B. Alix Jr.
- Based on: Life of Ronald dela Rosa
- Produced by: Arnold Vegafria
- Starring: Robin Padilla; Beauty Gonzalez
- Production companies: ALV Films; Benchingko Films
- Distributed by: Regal Entertainment
- Release dates: January 29, 2019 (SM Megamall); January 30, 2019
- Country: Philippines
- Language: Filipino

Bato (The General Ronald dela Rosa Story) is a 2019 Filipino biographical action film directed by Adolfo Alix Jr., starring Robin Padilla as the titular police official. Produced by ALV Films and Benchingko Films within the span of two months and distributed by Regal Entertainment, Bato was released in theaters on January 30, 2019, which became controversial for its timing near the campaign period of the 2019 Senate election, in which the actual dela Rosa was a senatorial candidate. Both Padilla and dela Rosa would eventually serve as senators together in the Philippine Senate.

== Cast ==
- Robin Padilla as Gen. Ronald "Bato" dela Rosa
  - Kiko Estrada as PMA cadet Bato
  - Ryle Paolo Santiago as teenage Bato
  - Miguel Vergara as child Bato
- Beauty Gonzalez as Nancy dela Rosa
  - Alyssa Muhlach Alvarez as young Nancy
- Joko Diaz as a terrorist
- Polo Ravales as a terrorist
- Rocco Nacino as a terrorist
- Alfred Vargas as a terrorist
- Ali Forbes
- Chanel Morales
- Monsour del Rosario as a police officer
- Jayke Joson as a negotiator
- Ricky Davao as Doro dela Rosa
- Gina Alajar as Anesia dela Rosa
- Dennis Roldan as a detained NPA leader
- Dindo Arroyo as an NPA leader
- Val Iglesias as an NPA leader
- Kiko Matos as a detained NPA member
- Ping Medina as an NPA informer
- Archie Alemania as a police officer
- Rendon Labador as a police officer
- John Arcilla as P/Dir. Gen. Ricardo Marquez
- Efren Reyes Jr. as Mayor Rodrigo Duterte
- Allan Paule as Governor of Davao
- Mark Anthony Fernandez as Bongbong Marcos
- Jong Cuenco as Pastor Apollo Quiboloy

== Development and marketing ==
Bato was produced by ALV Films, a production company established by talent manager Arnold L. Vegafria, and Benchingko Films, the production outfit of the clothing brand Bench.

In early December 2018, Ronald dela Rosa began meeting with the film's writers, expressing his desire for Robin Padilla and Sharon Cuneta to respectively play him and his wife Nancy if ever a film is made about him. He also has expressed his preference to have the film focus on his biography rather than his romance with his wife in particular. Bato was directed by Adolfo Alix Jr., a filmmaker known for his independently-produced drama films.

Padilla was first approached by Jayke Joson at the request of senator Manny Pacquiao about starring in a film about dela Rosa. According to Padilla, Bato was the first film to feature him crying in order to portray dela Rosa's emotional side.

None of the film's marketing material credit the film's crew members other than the director and two lead actors.

== Release ==
Bato premiered at the SM Megamall in Ortigas Center, Mandaluyong on January 30, 2019, with Philippine President Rodrigo Duterte in attendance.

The release of Bato was questioned due to its timing in relation to the candidacy of dela Rosa for the 2019 Philippine Senate election. Among those critical of the film's release were filmmakers Lore Reyes and Carlito Siguion-Reyna, as well as screenwriter Jerry Gracio. The Commission on Elections has warned that dela Rosa could be disqualified if the film is still being aired in Philippine cinemas on February 12, 2019 or the official start of the campaign period for national candidates.

== See also ==
- "Steak", a television episode about Christopher "Bong" Go, a candidate for the 2019 senate election
