= Ganti ng Puso =

Philippine action drama film

- Directed by: Francis "Jun" Posadas
- Written by: Roy C. Iglesias
- Produced by: Edgar Abanilla
- Starring: Stella Ruiz; Gandong Cervantes
- Cinematography: Val Dauz
- Edited by: Ferren Salumbides
- Music by: Rey Magtoto
- Production company: Mahogany Pictures
- Distributed by: Mahogany Pictures
- Release date: January 31, 1996
- Running time: 95 minutes
- Country: Philippines
- Language: Filipino

Ganti ng Puso is a 1996 Philippine action drama film directed by Francis "Jun" Posadas. The film stars Stella Ruiz and Gandong Cervantes. It also marks the film debut of Lara Morena.

The film is streaming online on YouTube.

== Synopsis ==
After witnessing a heinous crime, Loida was framed as the murder suspect. Due to unfair treatment and injustices, she vowed to seek revenge against her enemies

== Cast ==
- Stella Ruiz as Loida
- Gandong Cervantes as Jim
- Dennis Roldan as Col. Maramba
- Efren Reyes Jr. as Nick
- King Gutierrez as Dolfo
- Carol Dauden as Ria
- Johnny Vicar as Warden
- Cloyd Robinson as Bank Manager
- Edwin Reyes as Edwin
- Lara Morena as Cherry

== Awards ==
Year	Awards	Category	Recipient	Result	Ref.
1997	8th YCC Awards	Best Screenplay	Roy C. Iglesias	Nominated	
1997	8th YCC Awards	Best Achievement in Film Editing	Ferren Salumbides	Nominated	
