= Takas sa Impierno =

1991 action film by Bebong Osorio

- Directed by: Bebong Osorio
- Screenplay by: Humilde "Meek" Roxas
- Story by: Pablo S. Gomez
- Produced by: Rose Flaminiano
- Starring: Ricky Davao; Cristina Gonzales; Paquito Diaz; Michael de Mesa; Dennis Roldan
- Cinematography: Ely Accion
- Edited by: Edgardo Vinarao
- Music by: Jaime Fabregas
- Production company: FLT Films
- Distributed by: FLT Films
- Release date: March 30, 1991
- Running time: 110 minutes
- Country: Philippines
- Language: Filipino

Takas sa Impierno (lit. Escape from Hell) is a 1991 Philippine action film directed by Bebong Osorio. The film stars Ricky Davao, Cristina Gonzales, Paquito Diaz, Michael de Mesa and Dennis Roldan.

== Plot ==
Cornelio quits his job as a soldier and returns to his hometown of Haznar. After beating up a group of thugs, he reunites with his mother Minyang, who tells him that Haznar is being tyrannized by the town's mayor, Sebastian, and his lecherous son, Julius. Cornelio is summoned to town hall by the pair, who lead the thugs he had encountered, and warn him not to get in their way. However, Cornelio reconnects with his old flame, Katrina, who has become a sex slave of Sebastian. One night, they are caught making out by Julius, who attempts to shoot Cornelio but ends up killing Katrina when she stands in his way. Seeking to hide the truth from his father, Julius arranges for Cornelio to be tried and convicted for Katrina's death instead.

While Cornelio is being transported to prison, his police escorts try to summarily execute him and Minyang, but Julius escapes by jumping into the river as his mother is fatally shot. Cornelio takes up arms and hunts down his persecutors, starting with the police and false witnesses during his trial. However, Cornelio is forced into hiding by Julius and Sebastian's goons, leading him to seek shelter in a mountain hut inhabited by Sarge, a retired soldier, and his blind niece Ester, with whom Cornelio develops a relationship with. Sarge, aware of Sebastian's excesses, helps Cornelio prepare for an attack by Julius, whose men discover Cornelio during a hunting trip. Julius and his men pursue him, but Sarge manages to alert Cornelio before he is spotted and shot dead by Julius, allowing Cornelio to engage Julius' men in a gunfight that decimates them and forces Julius to retreat.

Disappointed over Julius' handling of the situation, Sebastian arranges for his eldest son, Edmund, an army officer and friend of Cornelio, to hunt him down. Edmund warns that Cornelio is a veteran of jungle warfare and assembles a strike team to flush him out. However, Cornelio annihilates the team and warns off Edmund that he would not back down until he has had his revenge before knocking him unconscious. Cornelio then returns to Haznar and storms the town hall, killing Sebastian and his goons after a bloody gunfight, and capturing Julius. As Cornelio leads Julius away, Edmund arrives with more soldiers and threatens to open fire unless he surrenders. In response, Cornelio forces Julius at gunpoint to confess to killing Katrina. After he complies, Cornelio releases Julius, who gets hold of a rifle and shoots Cornelio dead. However, Julius' jubilation is short-lived after a livid Edmund has him arrested. Edmund and Ester go over Cornelio's body as Edmund salutes him.

== Cast ==
- Ricky Davao as Cornelio
- Cristina Gonzales as Ester
- Paquito Diaz as Mayor Sebastian
- Michael de Mesa as Julius
- Dennis Roldan as Edmund
- Robert Arevalo as Sarge
- Maritoni Fernandez as Katrina
- Robert Talabis as Mijares
- Jose Romulo as Chief
- Ernie Forte as Erning
- Lucita Soriano as Aling Minyang
- Robert Arevalo as Sarge
- Tom Alvarez as Soldier
- Bert Garon as Soldier
- Ernie Madriaga as Soldier
- Melissa de Leon as Judge
