= Hanggang sa Huling Bala =

Philippine action film

- Directed by: Jose N. Carreon
- Written by: Jose N. Carreon
- Produced by: William Lao
- Starring: Lito Lapid; Plinky Recto; Dennis Roldan
- Cinematography: Rey Lapid
- Edited by: Pepe Marcos
- Music by: Nonong Buencamino
- Production company: Megavision Films
- Distributed by: Megavision Films
- Release date: May 31, 1995
- Running time: 100 minutes
- Country: Philippines
- Language: Filipino

Hanggang sa Huling Bala (lit. Until the Last Bullet) is a 1995 Philippine action film written and directed by Jose N. Carreon. The film stars Lito Lapid, Plinky Recto and Dennis Roldan. It is dubbed as a "Victory Presentation" since it was released by the time Lapid won as governor of Pampanga.

== Cast ==
- Lito Lapid as David
- Plinky Recto as Carmen
- Dennis Roldan as Richard
- Sharmaine Suarez as Roxanne
- CJ Ramos as Butchoy
- Dante Rivero as Mr. Moto
- Dick Israel as Dado
- Rez Cortez as Lt. Rodrigo
- Perla Bautista as Kapitana
- Zandro Zamora as Turo
- Ben Sagmit as Ben Jukebox
