= Bilangin ang Bituin sa Langit (TV series) =

Philippine television drama series

- Title card
- Also known as: Stars of Hope
- Genre: Drama
- Based on: Bilangin ang Bituin sa Langit (1989) by Elwood Perez
- Written by: Geng Delgado; J-mee Katanyag; Kenneth De Leon
- Directed by: Laurice Guillen
- Creative director: Aloy Adlawan
- Starring: Nora Aunor; Mylene Dizon; Kyline Alcantara
- Theme music composer: James Ryan Manabat
- Opening theme: "Bilangin ang Bituin sa Langit" by Aicelle Santos
- Country of origin: Philippines
- Original language: Tagalog
- No. of episodes: 80 (list of episodes)

Production
- Executive producer: James Ryan Manabat
- Editors: Jennalyn Sablaya; Lara Linsangan; Mike Donard Robles; Ron Joseph Suñer
- Camera setup: Multiple-camera setup
- Running time: 20–33 minutes
- Production company: GMA Entertainment Group

Original release
- Network: GMA Network
- Release: February 24, 2020 – March 26, 2021

Bilangin ang Bituin sa Langit (transl. count the stars in the sky / international title: Stars of Hope) is a Philippine television drama series broadcast by GMA Network. The series is based on a 1989 Philippine film of the same title. Directed by Laurice Guillen, it stars Nora Aunor, Mylene Dizon and Kyline Alcantara. It premiered on February 24, 2020, on the network's Afternoon Prime line up. The series concluded on March 26, 2021, with a total of 80 episodes.

The series is streaming online on YouTube.

== Cast and characters ==
Cast

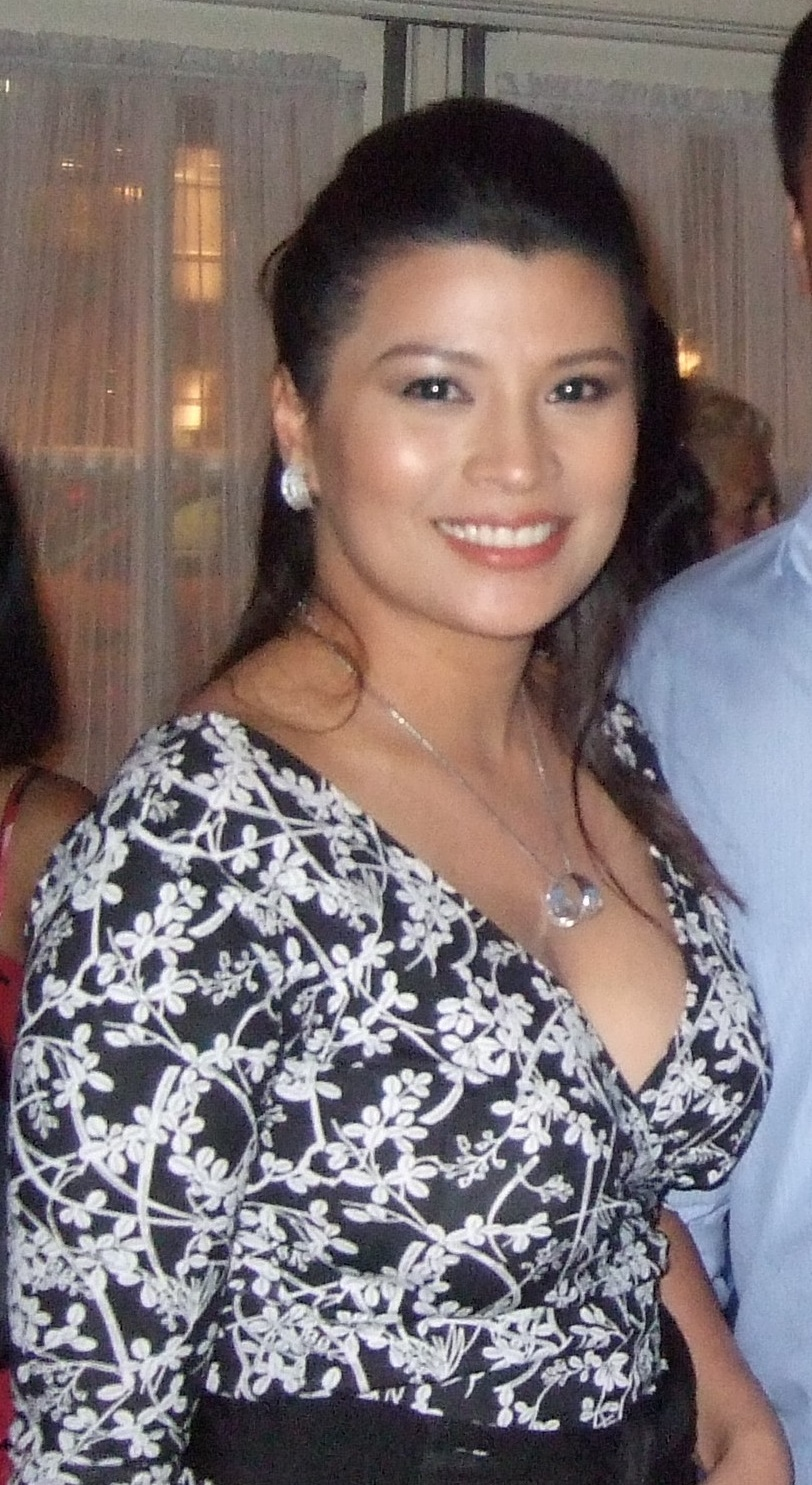
Mylene Dizon

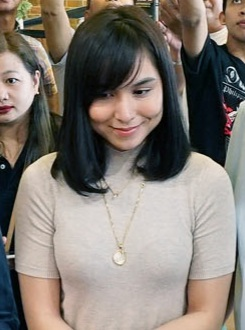
Kyline Alcantara

Lead cast

- Nora Aunor as Mercedes "Cedes" Ignacio-Dela Cruz
- Mylene Dizon as Magnolia "Nolie" Ignacio Dela Cruz
- Kyline Alcantara as Margarita "Maggie" D. Santos

Supporting cast

- Zoren Legaspi as Anselmo "Ansel" Santos
- Gabby Eigenmann as Arturo Zulueta
- Ina Feleo as Margaux Salcedo-Santos
- Candy Pangilinan as Connie Herrera
- Yasser Marta as Anselmo "Jun" Santos Jr.
- Isabel Rivas as Martina Santos

Guest cast

- Dante Rivero as Ramon Santos
- Ricky Davao as Damian Dela Cruz
- Divina Valencia as Editha Sinclair
- Aifha Medina as Violet
- Julia Lee as Lourdes
- Frank Garcia as Pocholo
- Carlos Agassi as Ringo
- Joel Palencia as Oslec

== Production ==
Principal photography commenced in January 2020. Filming was halted in March 2020 due to the enhanced community quarantine in Luzon caused by the COVID-19 pandemic. Filming was continued in October 2020. The series resumed its programming on January 5, 2021.

== Ratings ==
According to AGB Nielsen Philippines' Nationwide Urban Television Audience Measurement People in Television Homes, the pilot episode of Bilangin ang Bituin sa Langit earned a 5.1% rating.

== Accolades ==
Accolades received by Bilangin ang Bituin sa Langit
Year	Award	Category	Recipient	Result	Ref.
2021	34th PMPC Star Awards for Television	Best Daytime Drama Series	Bilangin ang Bituin sa Langit	Nominated	
2021	34th PMPC Star Awards for Television	Best Drama Actress	Nora Aunor	Nominated	
2021	34th PMPC Star Awards for Television	Best Drama Supporting Actor	Gabby Eigenmann	Nominated	
2021	34th PMPC Star Awards for Television	Best Drama Supporting Actress	Isabel Rivas	Nominated	
2023	35th PMPC Star Awards for Television	Best Daytime Drama Series	Bilangin ang Bituin sa Langit	Nominated	
