= You and Me Against the World (film) =

2003 action film by Jose N. Carreon

- Directed by: Jose N. Carreon
- Written by: Jose N. Carreon
- Produced by: Rose Flaminiano
- Starring: Robin Padilla; Kris Aquino
- Cinematography: Rey Lapid
- Edited by: Danny Gloria
- Music by: Ben Escasa
- Production company: FLT Films
- Distributed by: FLT Films
- Release date: March 12, 2003
- Running time: 110 minutes
- Country: Philippines
- Language: Filipino

You and Me Against the World is a 2003 Philippine action film written and directed by Jose N. Carreon. The film stars Robin Padilla and Kris Aquino. This is FLT Films' last film produced before entering a 3-year hiatus.

== Cast ==
- Robin Padilla as Paolo Guerrero
- Kris Aquino as Diana Rivero
- Elizabeth Burton as Kristine Cortez
- Mark Anthony Fernandez as Arnold Torrevilla
- Gary Estrada as Rocky
- Ricky Davao as Montes
- Ricardo Cepeda as P/Sr.Insp.Adolfo
- Rommel Padilla as Vincent
- Patrick Guzman as P/Insp.Rodrigo
- Bearwin Meily as Dirty Harry
- Jackie Aquino as Irene Rivera-Cortez
- Maritoni Fernandez as Celine Guerrero
- Alexia Alvarez as Aimee
- MJ Maranan as Henry Cortez
- Ramil Rodriguez as Mr. Torrevilla
- Ernie Forte as Mang Frankie
- Sol Carreon as Judge
- Ryan Quilala as Defense Lawyer
- Kim Flaminiano as Defense Lawyer
