= Stella Ruiz White =

Stella Ruiz
- Born: Stella Ruiz White; August 13, 1975 (age 50); Quezon City, Philippines
- Other name: Estella White
- Occupations: Actress, singer, model
- Years active: 1994–present
- Known for: Sambahin Mo Ang Katawan Ko

Stella Ruiz White (born August 13, 1975 in Quezon City, Philippines), known professionally as Stella Ruiz, is a former international fashion model, actress, singer and entrepreneur.

== Early beginnings ==
At age 14, she was discovered by Renee Salud and became a runway and commercial model. Stella attended and graduated high school from Trinity University of Asia formerly known as Trinity College of Quezon City. During her undergraduate studies in Mass Communication at an exclusive school for women in Quezon City, Stella left school to pursue her modeling career in Singapore, Malaysia and Hong Kong. She has since toured internationally and appeared as an image model for popular clothing apparel, accessories and other Fortune 500 companies (Guess Jeans, Coach, Red Bull, Rusty Lopez, Fiona of Robinsons, Speedo, House of Sara Lee, and many others).

In 1996, Ruiz joined the Miss Philippines beauty pageant and became one of the finalists. She was later on disqualified for being a nonresident.

== Career ==
Ruiz was a contract artist of Mahogany Pictures during her early years. She made her film debut in the 1995 film Sambahin Mo Ang Katawan Ko, where she was nominated as Best Newcomer for this role by Star Awards the following year. She also starred in Delinkwente (1995), Ganti ng Puso (1996), Room for Rent (1996) and Kid Manalo (1997).

Since 1997, Ruiz bagged supporting roles in television series, such as Rio del Mar (GMA), Esperanza (ABS-CBN) and Sugo (GMA).

At the turn of the century, Ruiz shifted to singing. She has performed all over the Philippines and abroad. Stella came out with an original by Fermin Flores entitled "Cry Over You", which appeared on MTV Asia. This song is the carrier single of a compilation along with her own rendition of "Missing You".

Now residing in New Jersey, she continues to perform in various venues in New York City and New Jersey area.

== Personal life ==
She is the daughter of Patricia Ruiz and Ernest Eugene White.

Stella married Phillip in 2009. Phillip was formerly in a relationship with Gladys Guevarra.

She became a Democratic Committeewoman for Bergen County, NJ.

== Filmography ==
=== Film ===
Year	Title	Role
1995	Sambahin Mo Ang Katawan Ko	Magie
1995	Delinkwente	Shiela
1996	Ganti ng Puso	Loida
1996	Bitag	Bernadette
1996	Room for Rent	Jessie
1997	Kid Manalo, Akin Ang Ulo Mo	Jessica
1997	Kapag Nasukol Ang Asong Ulol	Cristina
1997	Bawal Mahalin, Bawal Ibigin	Amanda
1998	Kung Ayaw Mo, Huwag Mo!	Yogi
1999	Resbak, Babalikan Kita	Salome
