= Room for Rent (1996 film) =

Philippine romantic comedy film

- Directed by: Junn Cabreira
- Written by: Mike Tan
- Produced by: Victor Villegas
- Starring: Emilio Garcia; Stella Ruiz; Raymond Bagatsing; Bernadette Marquez
- Cinematography: Rudy Diño
- Edited by: Ferren Salumbides
- Music by: Edwin "Kiko" Ortega
- Production company: Mahogany Pictures
- Distributed by: Mahogany Pictures
- Release date: October 9, 1996
- Running time: 105 minutes
- Country: Philippines
- Language: Filipino

Room for Rent is a 1996 Philippine romantic comedy film directed by Junn Cabreira. The film stars Emilio Garcia, Stella Ruiz, Raymond Bagatsing and Bernadette Marquez. It is a remake of the 1986 film Dingding Lang ang Pagitan.

== Cast ==
- Emilio Garcia as Peter
- Stella Ruiz as Jessie
- Raymond Bagatsing as Johnny
- Bernadette Marquez as Sandra
- Chariz de Villa as Kirina
- Lito Pimentel as Rey
- Dante Javier as Beerhouse Customer

== Production ==
The film was initially known as Room for Rent: Dingding Lang ang Pagitan. However, the tagline was dropped from its title to avoid legal complications against Ronald Carballo, director of the 1986 film who owns the said tagline.
