= Ricky Davao =

Filipino actor and director (1961–2025)

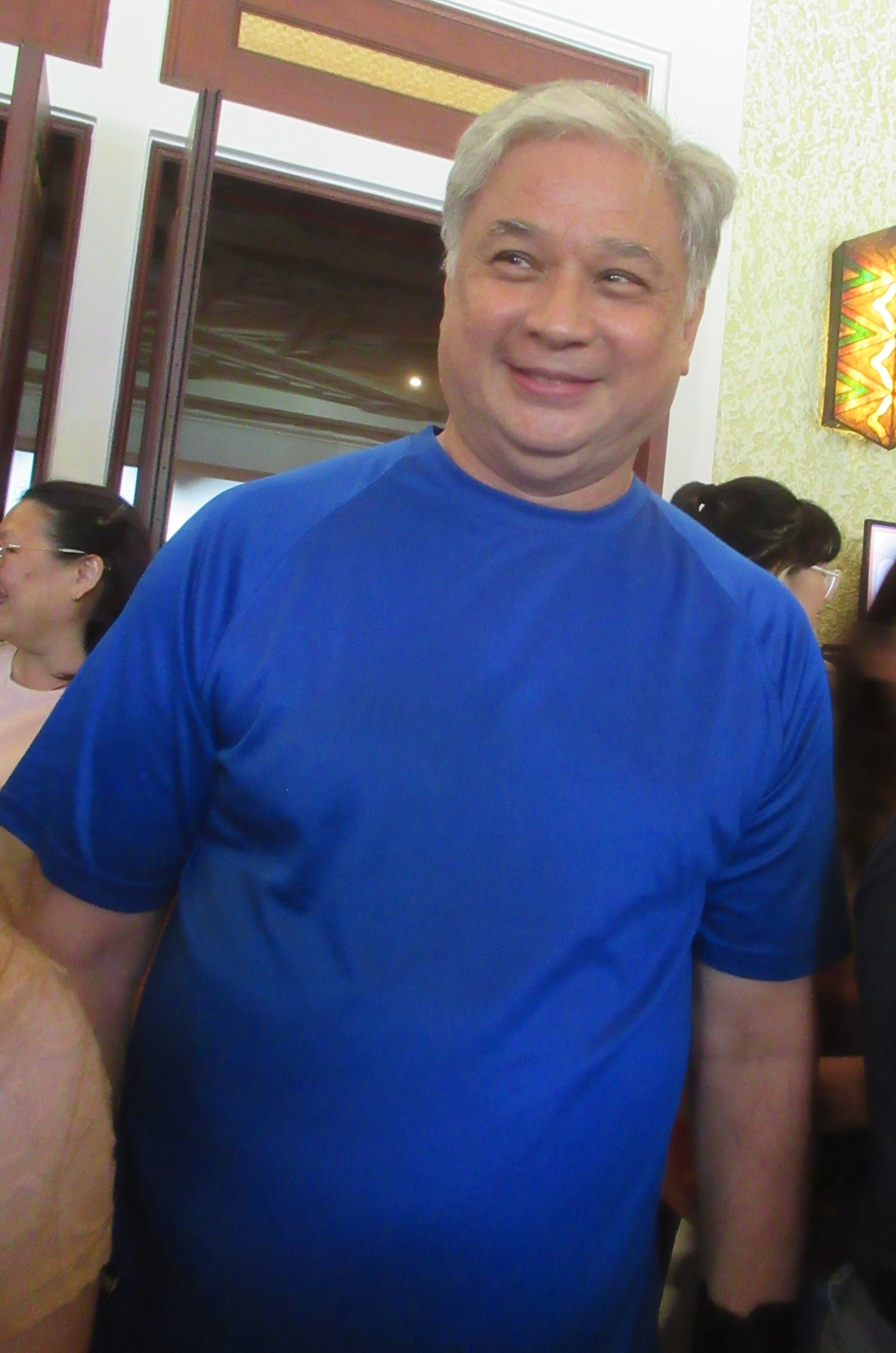
- Davao in 2023
- Born: Frederick Charles Abiera Davao; May 30, 1961; Manila, Philippines
- Died: May 1, 2025 (aged 63); Taguig City, Philippines
- Citizenship: Philippines
- Occupations: Actor; television director
- Years active: 1978–2025
- Employers: ABS-CBN (1992–2006); GMA Network (2006–2025)
- Spouse: Jackie Lou Blanco (m. 1989)
- Children: 4
- Father: Charlie Davao
- Website: Ricky Davao on Facebook; Ricky Davao on Instagram

Frederick Charles Abiera Davao (May 30, 1961 – May 1, 2025) was a Filipino actor and television director.

== Career ==
Davao began his career in the entertainment industry in 1978 as a dancer for the Vicor Crowd group. Later in the year, he had his first stint in acting as a cast member in the film Patayin si Mediavillo starring Fernando Poe Jr. and directed by Armando Herrera. He entered theater in 1982 by appearing in Convent Bread, produced by Nora Aunor and directed by Maryo J. de los Reyes. He was also known for portraying a fictionalized version of Bongbong Marcos in the play Bongbong at Kris in the 1980s. In 1996, he made his first directorial piece, an episode of the drama anthology Maalaala Mo Kaya titled "Sagwan".

He served as a juror in the first ASEAN International Film Festival Awards in 2013, and he performed in the Pinoy Playlist Music Festival 2019.

== Politics ==
Davao ran for councilor in the 4th district of Quezon City in the 2010 elections under the Nationalist People's Coalition (NPC). He later withdrew due to conflict of interest, as a COMELEC rule prohibits actor-candidates from appearing in movies and TV shows during the campaign period. At the time, Davao was part of the cast of Working Girls, a movie which was set to open on April 21, 2010, which was within the campaign period.

== Personal life and death ==
Davao was the son of actor Charlie Davao. He had two brothers, who also worked as actors.

Davao began a relationship with actress Jackie Lou Blanco after Blanco stood in for Snooky Serna in the variety program GMA Supershow. Davao was supposed to sing to Snooky but because the latter failed to appear, Blanco was pulled in to replace her. They married in 1989 and had three children before separating in 2011. In 2021, they reunited on-screen via drama anthology, I Can See You: AlterNate, where they acted as husband and wife. Starting in 2022, Davao entered into a relationship with Malca Darocca.

Davao died from cancer on May 1, 2025, at the age of 63. His family announced his death the next day.

== Filmography ==
=== As actor ===
==== Film ====
Year	Film	Role	Notes
1978	Patayin si.... Mediavillo		
1981	Totoo Ba ang Tsismis?		
1981	Rock n' Roll		
1981	Ang Babae sa Ilog		
1982	Dormitoryo! Buhay Estudyante	Sonny	
1982	Schoolgirls	Cloyd	
1983	Kasal o Asawa		
1984	Condemned	Joey	
1984	Ang Padrino	Alex dela Costa	
1984	Bulaklak sa City Jail	Crisanto	
1985	White Slavery	Allan	
1985	Mga Paru-Parong Buking	Victor	
1986	Agaw Armas	Joseph	
1986	Payaso		
1986	Magdusa Ka	Roland	
1987	Kung Aagawin Mo ang Lahat sa Akin	Arvin	
1987	Huwag Mong Buhayin ang Bangkay	Gabriel	
1987	Saan Nagtatago ang Pag-Ibig	Ric	
1987	If You Take Everything Away From Me	Arvin	
1988	Ang Pangako ng Bagong Simulain		Short film by director Mark Meily
1988	Misis Mo, Misis Ko	Rafael Villanueva	
1988	Natutulog Pa ang Diyos	Andrew Velasco	
1988	Isusumbong Kita sa Diyos		
1988	Huwag Mong Itanong Kung Bakit	Dante Cuevas	
1989	Alyas Boy Life	Boy Life	
1989	Abot Hanggang Sukdulan	Romano	
1989	Irosin: Pagputok ng Araw, Babaha ng Dugo		
1989	Eagle Squad		
1989	Imortal		
1990	Kahit Konting Pagtingin	Charlie	
1991	Leon ng Maynila: P/Col. Romeo B. Maganto, WPD-MPFF	Celso	
1991	Takas sa Impierno	Cornelio	
1991	Moro (The Lt. Col Mangdangan P. Domato Story)		
1992	Patayin si Billy Zapanta – Order of Battle: Enemy No. 1	Billy Zapanta	
1993	Deo Dador: Berdugo ng Munti	Deo Dador	
1993	Magkasangga 2000	Tony Braganza	International title: Ultracop 2000
1994	Three Who Dared		Television film
1994	The Maggie dela Riva Story: God... Why Me?	Eduard Aquino	
1995	Eskapo	Atty. Jake Almeda López	
1995	Ipaglaban Mo: The Movie	Alan de los Santos	"Rape: Case No. 538832" segment
1995	Asero		
1995	Muling Umawit ang Puso	Tony Gallardo	
1996	Oki Doki Doc: The Movie		
1996	Moises Arcanghel: Sa Guhit ng Bala		
1996	Kristo	Barabás	
1996	Itataya Ko ang Buhay Ko	Cesar Padua	
1997	Kokey	Nanding	
1997	Ang Lalaki sa Buhay ni Selya	Ramon	
1997	The Mariano Mison Story	Levi Nolasco	
1997	Puerto Princesa	Edward Hagedorn	Edward Hagedorn biopic
1999	Mula sa Puso	Eduard	Cameo
1999	Saranggola	Homer	
1999	Bayaning 3rd World	Filmmaker #1	
2000	Azucena	Tomas	
2001	Minsan May Isang Puso	Simon Pacheco	
2001	American Adobo	Gerry	
2002	Hibla	Roman	
2003	Anghel sa Lupa	Arnold	
2003	You and Me Against the World	Montes	
2003	Crying Ladies	Guido	
2004	All My Life	Jun	
2005	Stray Cats	Boyet	
2005	Pinoy Blonde		
2006	Nasaan si Francis?	Manong Jay	
2006	Pacquiao: The Movie	Polding Correa	
2006	Saan Nagtatago si Happiness?		2006 Cinemalaya Independent Film Festival entry
2006	Mudraks		2006 Cinemalaya Independent Film Festival entry
2007	Faces of Love		2006 Cinemanila International Film Festival entry
2007	Sakal, Sakali, Saklolo	Alex	
2007	Durog		2007 Cinemalaya Independent Film Festival entry - Shorts
2007	Sinungaling na Buwan		2007 Cinemalaya Independent Film Festival entry
2007	Endo		2007 Cinemalaya Independent Film Festival entry
2007	Tambolista		2007 Cinema One Originals Digital Film Festival entry
2007	Tukso	subdivision developer	2007 Cinemalaya Independent Film Festival entry
2008	Adela	Felipe Macaraig	
2008	Dobol Trobol: Lets Get Redi 2 Rambol!	Ricardo	
2008	One Night Only	Congressman Facundo	33rd Metro Manila Film Festival entry
2008	Boses	Abusive father	2008 Cinemalaya Independent Film Festival entry; Graded "A" by the Cinema Evaluation Board
2008	Sapi	Padre Allan	
2009	Love Me Again	Ara's dad	rated B by the Cinema Evaluation Board
2009	Love on Line (LOL)	Attorney	
2009	Last Supper No. 3		Cameo; 2009 Cinemalaya Independent Film Festival - Best Film
2009	Mano Po 6: A Mother's Love		
2009	The Cockfighter (Sabungero)		
2009	Bente	town mayor	
2010	Paano Na Kaya	Roger Chua	
2010	Working Girls	Nelson Obleta	
2010	Rosario	Miguel Delgado	36th Metro Manila Film Festival entry
2010	Shake, Rattle and Roll 12	Abel	"Mamanyika" segment
2011	Hitman		
2011	Maskara		2011 Cinemalaya Independent Film Festival entry
2012	My Cactus Heart	Dan	
2012	Biktima		
2012	Sosy Problems	Sebastian Alvarez	38th Metro Manila Film Festival entry
2013	Coming Soon		
2013	Dance of the Steel Bars	reformist warden	
2013	Mana		
2014	S6parados	closet gay Marcel	2014 Cinemalaya Independent Film Festival entry
2014	Mariquina	Romeo Guevarra	2014 Cinemalaya Independent Film Festival entry
2014	The Janitor		2014 Cinemalaya Independent Film Festival entry
2015	Iadya Mo Kami (Deliver Us)	Julian	Entry at Salento International Film Festival in Italy and Silk Road Film Festival in Dubai
2015	Dáyâng Ásu	Mayor's henchman	Cinema One Originals 2015 entry
2015	Baka Siguro Yata (Perhaps Maybe Supposedly)	Carlo's father	Cinema One Originals 2015 entry
2015	Imbisibol	Edward	Sinag Maynila film festival 2015 entry
2015	Just The Way You Are	Arthur	
2016	Barcelona: A Love Untold	Robert de la Torre	
2016	Kabisera		Official entry to the Metro Manila Film Festival 2016
2016	Dukot	Charlie Sandoval	
2016	Magtanggol		
2017	Paki (Please Care)		Cinema One Originals 2017 entry
2017	Sa Gabing Nanahimik ang mga Kuliglig		English title: Clouds of Plague; 2017 Cinemalaya Independent Film Festival entry
2017	Ang Larawan	Drunkard on the street	Cameo; 2017 Metro Manila Film Festival (MMFF) entry
2017	Fallback	Aging director	
2017	Smaller and Smaller Circles	Cardinal Rafael Meneses	
2018	Kasal	Paul, Lia's father	
2018	Never Tear Us Apart (Fisting)	Q	Cinema One Originals 2018 entry
2018	Single Single: Love is Not Enough	Ramon	Filipino romance film from Cinema One Originals and The Philippines Star
2018	Wanda's Wonderful World	Dindo	
2018	Pang MMK (My Telenovela)	Senator Lon	
2018	Kung Paano Siya Nawala (How She Left Me)	Himself	Cameo
2019	Bato (The General Ronald dela Rosa Story)	Doro de la Rosa	
2019	Ani	Lolo Mauricio	2019 Cinemalaya Independent Film Festival entry
2019	F#*@bois	Sugar Daddy	2019 Cinemalaya Independent Film Festival entry
2019	Circa		Adolf Alix, Jr. film; part of the Pista ng Pelikulang Pilipino 2019’s Sandaan Showcase
2019	Clarita	Father Salvador	
2019	Killer Not Stupid	Adolf	Asian film by Jack Neo
2019	Metamorphosis	Edgar	Cinema One Originals 2019 entry
2020	Parole		2020 Cinemalaya Independent Film Festival entry
2020	Sunday Night Fever	Rudy	
2021	On the Job 2: The Missing 8		
2021	Big Night!	Dharna's father	2021 Metro Manila Film Festival (MMFF) entry
2023	Monday First Screening	Bobby	
2023	Karnabal		
2023	Ang Mga Kaibigan ni Mama Susan	Tiyo Dindo	
2025	Sosyal Climbers	Mr. Wendel Tecson	
2025	Sinagtala		
2026	58th	Reynaldo "Bebot" Momay	Posthumous release

==== Television ====
Year	Title	Role	
1992	Maalaala Mo Kaya: Piring		
1992	Maalaala Mo Kaya: Abaniko		
1994	Maalaala Mo Kaya: Videocam		
1994	Star Drama Theater Presents: Carmina: Pasang Krus		
1995	Maalaala Mo Kaya: Imbitasyon		
1995	Maalaala Mo Kaya: Ukit		
1995	Star Drama Theater Presents: Aiko: Penpal		
1996	Maalaala Mo Kaya: Hamog		
1996	Maalaala Mo Kaya: Closet		
1996–1997	Familia Zaragoza	Alfredo Zaragoza	
1996, 1998	Oki Doki Doc	Guest	
1997	Maalaala Mo Kaya: Manika		
1997–1999	Mula sa Puso	Edward Rodrigo	
1997–2002	Oka Tokat	Joaquin "Jack" Viloria	
2000–2002	Pangako Sa 'Yo	Tony Banks	
2002	Maalaala Mo Kaya: Makeup Kit		
2002–2003	Kay Tagal Kang Hinintay	Francis Ventaspejo	
2003	Maalaala Mo Kaya: Bubog		
2003	Maalaala Mo Kaya: Garapon		
2004	Maalaala Mo Kaya: Larawan	Charlie	
2004–2005	Spirits	Ramon	
2005	Vietnam Rose	Enrico Hernandez	
2006	Star Circle Kid Quest	Himself (Judge)	
2006	Familia Zaragoza	Alfredo Zaragoza	
2006	Maalaala Mo Kaya: Regalo	Rey Hernandez	
2006	Mars Ravelo's Captain Barbell	Cesar Magtanggol	
2007	Maalaala Mo Kaya: Dream House	Mike	
2007	Lupin	Master Moon Raven	
2008	Maalaala Mo Kaya: Mansyon	Darwin	
2008	E.S.P.	Larson	
2008	Mars Ravelo's Dyesebel	Don Juan Legaspi	
2009	Mars Ravelo's Darna	Dr. Morgan	
2009	Zorro	Father Felipe Gomez / Caballero #2	
2010	JejeMom	Lady Gangsta / Winston Wilson	
2010	Maalaala Mo Kaya: School Building	Belinda's husband	
2010	Maalaala Mo Kaya: Plane Ticket	Orlando Santos	
2011	Kung Aagawin Mo ang Langit	Delfin Martinez	
2011	Untold Stories: Isang Bahay, Dalawang Maybahay	Romulo	
2011	Maalaala Mo Kaya: Spain		
2011	Maalaala Mo Kaya: Susi	Maximo	
2012	Protégé: The Battle for the Big Artista Break	Himself/Mentor	
2013	Home Sweet Home	Manolo	
2013	Carmela	Danilo Fernandez	
2014	Magpakailanman: Kabang - Hero Dog	Rudy	
2014	Magpakailanman: Ama Ko, Mahal Ko - The Kim Fajardo Story	Orly	
2014	Magpakailanman: Hari ng Kalsada - Traffic Enforcer, Turon Best-seller	Fernando	
2014		Pepito Manaloto	Robert Maceda Sr.
2015	Second Chances	Benito Bermudez	
2015	Magpakailanman: Ang Sakripisyo ng Isang Ina - The Nancy Cañares story	Tony	
2015	Magpakailanman: Ang Huling Laro ng Aking Anak	Arman	
2015	Pepito Manaloto	Robert Maceda Sr.	
2015	My Faithful Husband	Arnaldo Castro	
2015		Eat Bulaga Lenten Special: Lukso Ng Dugo	abusive father
2016	Poor Señorita	Daniel Villon	
2016	Tonight with Boy Abunda	Guest	
2017	Legally Blind	Manuel Evangelista	
2017	My Korean Jagiya	Jose "Josie" Asuncion	
2017	Magpakailanman: Small and Lovable: The Juvy, Joel and Angie Macahilig Story	Mario	
2018	Inday Will Always Love You	Philip Fuentes	
2018		Pepito Manaloto	Robert Maceda Sr.
2019	The Journey	Gen Eduardo Granados	
2020	The Tapes		
2020	Bilangin ang Bituin sa Langit	Damian Dela Cruz	
2020	Daddy's Gurl	Ceferino Escobar	
2020	Proud Ako Sa’yo		
2020–2021	Paano ang Pangako?	Jose Aguinaldo	
2021	The World Between Us	Emmanuelito "Emmanuel" Asuncion / Noli	
2022	Misis Piggy	Rupert	
2022	I Can See You: AlterNate	Lyndon David	
2022	Family Feud	Himself (guest player)	
2022	Tadhana: Tayong Dalawa	Mama Gigi	
2022	Magpakailanman: Ang Pagtatapos ng Anak (The Felipe and Mark Sanchez Story)	Felipe Sanchez	
2022	Lampas Langit	Arman	
2023	Love Before Sunrise	Rodrigo Montelibano	
2025	Encantadia Chronicles: Sang'gre (posthumous/final appearance)	Gov. Emilio "Emil" Salvador	

==== Web series ====
Year	Title	Role
2023	Cattleya Killer	Demet Noble

==== Theatre ====
Year	Title	Role	Notes	Ref
1982	Convent Bread		Produced by Nora Aunor and directed by Maryo J. de los Reyes	
1983	Felipe de las Casas	Felipe de las Casas	Written by Paul Dumol, directed by Nonon Padilla and produced by Don Jaime Zobel de AyalaW	
1984	Lihis		Dulaang UP's production of the Philippine adaptation of Martin Sherman's "Bent"	
1987	Bongbong at Kris	Bongbong	by playwright Bienvenido Noriega Jr., which won a prize in the 1987 Cultural Center of the Philippines play writing contest as "romansa't komedya sa pelikula't pulitika	
1997	Larawan	vaudeville piano player Tony Javier	a three-hour musical that was performed in the main theatre of the Cultural Center of the Philippines (CCP)	
1999	The King and I	King Mongkut of Siam		
2003	Insiang	Dado	Directed by Chris Millado based on the script by Mario O'Hara (who also wrote the original story for the film with the same title), Tanghalang Pilipino staged the play to great acclaim, winning several Aliw Awards in 2003, including Best Play.	
2004	Speaking in Tongues		an Australian award-winning drama presented by Tanghalang Pilipino at the CCP’s Tanghalang Huseng Batute at 8 p.m., every Friday, Saturday and Sunday (with 3 p.m. matinees on Saturday and Sunday) until July 25, 2004	
2007	Art	Jun	Filipino adaptation of the international comedy hit; Produced by Little Boy Productions and Actor's Actors Inc.; Saturday, September 22, at the Music Museum	
2007	Insiang	Dado	Cultural Center of the Philippines (CCP) limited two-weekend run from October 5 to 15, 2007 - Tanghalang Pilipino production directed by Chris Millado from the script by Mario O'Hara	
2008	Padre Pio ng Pietrelcina (The Life of Padre Pio)	Padre Pio	Written and directed by Nestor U. Torre; staged on January 16, 18 and 19, 2008, 8 p.m. at the People's Village in Tiendesitas, Frontera Verde, Pasig	
2008	EJ: Ang Pinagdaanang Buhay nina Evelio Javier at Edgar Jopson	Evelio Javier	rock musical, presented by Tanghalang Pilipino, the CCP's resident theater company, and written by Carlos Palanca Hall of Fame awardee Ed Maranan, is about the lives and struggles of two Ateneo de Manila alumni who became revered heroes and martyrs of the Filipino people's resistance against the martial law regime of dictator Ferdinand Marcos in the 1970s	
2015	Palasyo ni Valentin	Valentin	De La Salle-College of St. Benilde production written by Mario O’Hara and directed by Nonon Padilla	
2016	DOM: Dirty Old Musical	Bebong	Spotlight Artists Centre’s original Filipino musical is about fictional 80s boy band ‘The Bench Boys’ who find themselves in a room together after 30 years.	
2023	Baka Naman Hindi	Victor Delgado & Dodong	CCP production; Tanghalang Aurelio Tolentino (CCP Little Theater) on October 18 to 21 at 8:00 p.m. and October 20 to 21 at 3:00 p.m.	
2023	Contra Mundum: Ang All-Star Concert ng Ang Larawan	vaudeville piano player Tony Javier	Invitational affair staged on 6 May 2023, Saturday 7:00 p.m. at the Metropolitan Theater to kick off National Heritage Month and also to mark 50 years of the establishment of the Philippine’s Order of National Artists.	
2023	Silver Lining (Redux)	Leo	An original Filipino musical which tells the story of three long-time friends who produce a musical in their senior years and by doing so they must face the truth about a harsh event that haunted them since the ‘70s. The show ran from October 20–22 and October 27–29 at the Carlos P. Romulo Auditorium, RCBC Plaza. He reprised the role of Leo on the restaging held on November 8–10 and 15-17, 2024.	
TBA	In Frailty’s Grace		Posthumous release	
TBA	Jesus Christ Superstar		Posthumous release	
TBA	Biyaheng Timog		Posthumous release	
TBA	Hedda Gabler		Posthumous release	
TBA	Silang Nalugmok sa Gabi		Posthumous release	
TBA	Dalagang Bukid		Posthumous release	

=== As director ===
==== Television ====
Year	Programs	Role	Notes
1996	Maalaala Mo Kaya: Sagwan	Director	
1997	Esperanza: Episode 181 & 188	Director	
1997	Maalaala Mo Kaya: Kubrekama	Director	
1997	Maalaala Mo Kaya: Tubao	Director	
1997–2002	!Oka Tokat	Director	
1998	Maalaala Mo Kaya: Typewriter	Director	
1999–2002	Ang Munting Paraiso	Director	
2004	Maalaala Mo Kaya: Orchids	Director	
2007	Paraiso: Tatlong Kwento ng Pag-Asa	Director	
2010	Grazilda	2nd Unit Director	
2011	Kokak	Director	
2011	Sisid	Director	
2012	Coffee Prince	Director	
2012	Makapiling Kang Muli	Director	
2012	Magpakailanman: The Ryzza Mae Story	Director	
2012	Magpakailanman: Sa Likod ng mga Ngiti - The Stories of John Edric Ulang nd Jaylord Casino	Director	
2012	Magpakailanman: The Miriam Castillo Story	Director	
2012	Magpakailanman: The Nanay Silveria Story	Assistant Director	
2013	Mga Basang Sisiw	Director	
2013	Adarna	Director	
2013	Forever	Director	
2013	One Day Isang Araw: Lola Labs (Episode 4)	Director	
2013	Magpakailanman: Pusong Bato - The Renee dela Rosa Story	Director	
2013	Magpakailanman: The Wally Bayola Story	Director	
2013	Magpakailanman: Nasayang na Jackpot - The Dionie Reyes Story	Director	
2014	Magpakailanman: Sa Bangin ng Kamatayan	Director	
2014	Dading	Director	
2015	Second Chances	Director	
2015	Magpakailanman: Inang Yaya - The Nieves Limpin Story	Director	
2015	Magpakailanman: Misis Ipinagpalit sa Beki	Director	
2015	The Half Sisters	Guest director	20 episodes
2015–2016	Because of You	Director	
2015–2016	Little Nanay	Director	
2016	Sinungaling Mong Puso	Director	
2016	Magpakailanman: Dalawang Babae, Isang Anak	Director	
2016	Magpakailanman: Ang Sundalong Magiting	Director	
2017	Legally Blind	Director	
2018	Eat Bulaga Lenten Special: A Daughter's Love	Director	
2018	Inday Will Always Love You	Director	
2019	Eat Bulaga Lenten Special: Ikigai - Buhay ng Buhay Ko	Director	
2019	Dahil sa Pag-ibig	Director	
2020	Paano ang Pasko?	Director	
2020	Awit at Tula: Pagbabaliktanaw sa Unang Hari Ng Balagtasan	Director	
2021	Nagbabagang Luha	Director	
2023	The Seed of Love	Director	

== Awards ==
Year	Award-giving body	Category	Work	Result	Ref
1988	1988 Aliw Awards	Best Stage Actor	Bongbong and Kris	Won	
1989	1989 Gawad Urian	Best Actor	Misis Mo, Misis Ko	Nominated	
1990	1990 FAMAS Awards	Best Supporting Actor	Abot Hanggang Sukdulan	Won	
1990	1990 Gawad Urian	Best Supporting Actor	Abot Hanggang Sukdulan	Nominated	
1995	1995 Gawad Urian	Best Supporting Actor	Ipaglaban Mo: The Movie	Won	
1995	1995 Film Academy of the Philippines Awards	Best Supporting Actor	Ipaglaban Mo: The Movie	Won	
1998	1998 Aliw Awards	Best Stage Actor	Sawi	Won	
1999	1999 Metro Manila Film Festival	Best Actor	Saranggola	Won	
1999	1999 Gawad Urian	Best Actor	Saranggola	Won	
1999	Cinemanila Int’l Filmfest	Best Actor	Saranggola	Won	
2000	2000 Star Awards for Movies	Best Actor	Saranggola	Won	
2000	2000 Filipino Academy of Movie Arts and Sciences Awards (FAMAS)	Best Actor	Saranggola	Nominated	
2001	Annual Citations of Young Critics Circle Film Desk	Best Performance	Minsan May Isang Puso	Nominated	
2002	2002 Star Awards for Movies	Best Actor	Minsan May Isang Puso	Won	
2002	2002 Luna Awards of the Film Academy of the Philippines (FAP)	Best Actor	Minsan May Isang Puso	Won	
2002	GMMSF Box-Office Entertainment Awards Guillermo Mendoza Memorial Scholarship Foundation	Mr. RP Movies		Won	
2002	2002 Aliw Awards	Best Stage Actor	Insiang	Won	
2003	2003 Aliw Awards	Best Stage Actor	Speaking in Tongues	Won	
2006	2006 Star Awards for Movies	Best Actor	Mga Pusang Gala	Nominated	
2006	3rd Golden Screen Awards	Best Performance by an Actor in a Leading Role-Drama	Mga Pusang Gala	Nominated	
2006	2006 Filipino Academy of Movie Arts and Sciences Awards (FAMAS)	Best Actor	Mga Pusang Gala	Nominated	
2006	2006 Film Academy of the Philippines Awards	Best Actor	Mga Pusang Gala	Nominated	
2007	Gawad Tagapuring mga Akademisyan ng Aninong Gumagalaw (TANGLAW)	Jury Award for Excellence		Won	
2007	Fanclubx.com	Lifetime Achievement Award		Won	
2008	United Kingdom International Filmmaker Film Festival	Best Supporting Actor	Signos	Won	
2008	5th Golden Screen Awards of the Entertainment Press Society or ENPRESS, Inc.	Best Performance by an Actor in a Supporting Role (Drama, Musical or Comedy)	Endo	Won	
2008	2008 Aliw Awards	Hall of Fame		Won	
2009	25th Star Awards for Movies	Movie Supporting Actor of the Year	Boses	Nominated	
2009	6th Golden Screen Awards of the Entertainment Press Society or ENPRESS, Inc.	Best Performance by An Actor in a Supporting Role (Drama, Musical or Comedy)	Boses	Nominated	
2011	2011 Golden Screen TV Awards of the Entertainment Press Society or ENPRESS, Inc.	Outstanding Supporting Actor in a Gag or Comedy Program	Jejemom	Nominated	
2013	YES! Most Beautiful Stars 2013	The Idol		Won	
2015	Cinema One Originals Film Festival 2015	Best Actor	Dayang Asu	Nominated	
2015	2015 BroadwayWorld Philippines Awards	Best Actor (Play)	Palasyo ni Valentin	Won	
2016	39th Gawad Urian Awards	Best Actor	Dayang Asu	Nominated	
2017	3rd ASEAN International Film Festival & Awards (AIFFA)	Best Supporting Actor	Dayang Asu	Won	
2017	Film Development Council of the Philippines (FDCP)'s Film Ambassadors’ Night	Film Ambassador - Actor (Film)	Dayang Asu	Won	
2017	Cinema One Originals Film Festival 2017	Best Supporting Actor	Paki	Won	
2017	35th Luna Awards of the Film Academy of the Philippines (FAP)	Best Supporting Actor	Dukot	Nominated	
2017	65th Filipino Academy of Movie Arts and Sciences Awards (FAMAS)	Best Supporting Actor	Iadya Mo Kami	Won	
2017	33rd PMPC Star Awards	Best Supporting Actor	Dukot	Nominated	
2018	66th Filipino Academy of Movie Arts and Sciences Awards (FAMAS)	Best Supporting Actor	Paki	Nominated	
2019	2019 Cinemalaya Philippine Independent Film Festival	Best Supporting Actor	Fuccbois	Won	
2019	3rd EDDYS Awards of the Society of Philippine Entertainment Editors (SPEEd)	Best Supporting Actor	Kasal	Nominated	
2019	GAWAD Pasado (Pampelikulang Samahan ng mga Dalubguro) Awards 2019	Best Supporting Actor (Pinaka-Pasadong Katuwang Na Aktor)	Kasal	Won	
2020	2020 FAMAS Awards	Best Supporting Actor	Fuccbois	Won	
2020	43rd Gawad Urian Awards	Best Supporting Actor	Fuccbois	Nominated	
2021	36th Philippine Movie Press Club (PMPC) Star Awards for Movies	Best Supporting Actor	Fuccbois	Won	
2021	4th EDDYS Awards of the Society of Philippine Entertainment Editors (SPEEd)	Best Supporting Actor	Sunday Night Fever	Nominated	
2022	Industriya ng Pelikulang Filipino mula sa gaganaping Gintong Parangal 2022	Natatanging Gintong Parangal Bilang Pinakamahusay na Aktor at Direktor		Won	
2022	5th EDDYS Awards of the Society of Philippine Entertainment Editors (SPEEd)	Best Supporting Actor	Big Night	Nominated	
2023	38th Philippine Movie Press Club (PMPC) Star Awards for Movies	Best Supporting Actor	Big Night	Nominated	
2023	2023 Aliw Awards	Best Actor	Silver Lining	Nominated	
