= 1994 Metro Manila Film Festival =

Film festival edition

- Date: December 25, 1994 to January 3, 1995
- Site: Manila, Philippines

Highlights
- Best Picture: none (Note: Most of the major awards were not given including the "Best Picture" category.)
- Most awards: Lucas Abelardo (6)

The 20th Metro Manila Film Festival was held in December 1994. This film festival is notable because no film won the award for Best Picture, the Gatpuno Antonio J. Villegas Cultural Awards, Best Director, and Best Screenplay. When asked on the absence of these awards, Board of Jurors chairman Alejandro Roces stated that none of the entries during that year were deserving of the awards. Furthermore, this film festival is different from the Manila Film Festival (MFF) that took place earlier that year, which was marked by a scandal over the recipient of the Best Actor and Best Actress award.

== Entries ==
Title	Starring	Studio	Director	Genre
Kanto Boy 2: Anak ni Totoy Guapo	Ian Veneracion, Kimberly Diaz, Ramon Christopher, Dick Israel, Bob Soler, Max Laurel, Dencio Padilla, Jimmy Fabregas	Moviestars Productions	Augusto Salvador	Action, Crime, Drama
Lucas Abelardo	Roi Vinzon, Dante Rivero, Bembol Roco, Bob Soler, Karen Timbol, Zando Zamora, King Gutierrez, Conrad Poe, Levy Ignacio, Dencio Padilla	Levin Films	Jose "Kaka" Balagtas	Action, Crime, Drama
Mama's Boys 2: Let's Go Na!	Anjo Yllana, Ogie Alcasid, Michael V., Patrick Guzman, Sunshine Cruz, Lailani Navarro, Aileen Angeles, Jennifer Mendoza	OctoArts Films	Tony Y. Reyes	Comedy
Ang Pagbabalik ni Pedro Penduko	Janno Gibbs, Chiquito, Leo Martinez, Jun Aristorenas, Vina Morales, Donita Rose, Arnmel Ignacio, Malu de Guzman	VIVA Films	J. Erastheo Navoa	Action, Adventure, Comedy, Fantasy
Shake, Rattle & Roll V	Episode 1: "Maligno" - Ruffa Gutierrez, Monsour del Rosario; Episode 2: "Anino" - Sheryl Cruz, Jacklyn Jose, Dingdong Dantes, Ogie Diaz; Episode 3: "Impakto" - Manilyn Reynes, Tom Taus, Jr., Chuck Perez, Don Pepot	Regal Films	Manny Castaneda and Jose Javier Reyes	Horror, Comedy
Wanted: Perfect Father	Dolphy, Dawn Zulueta, Edu Manzano, Babalu, Jeffrey Quizon, Rochelle Barrameda	Star Cinema	Efren Jarlego	Comedy, Drama, Family

== Winners and nominees ==
=== Awards ===
Winners are listed first and highlighted in boldface.

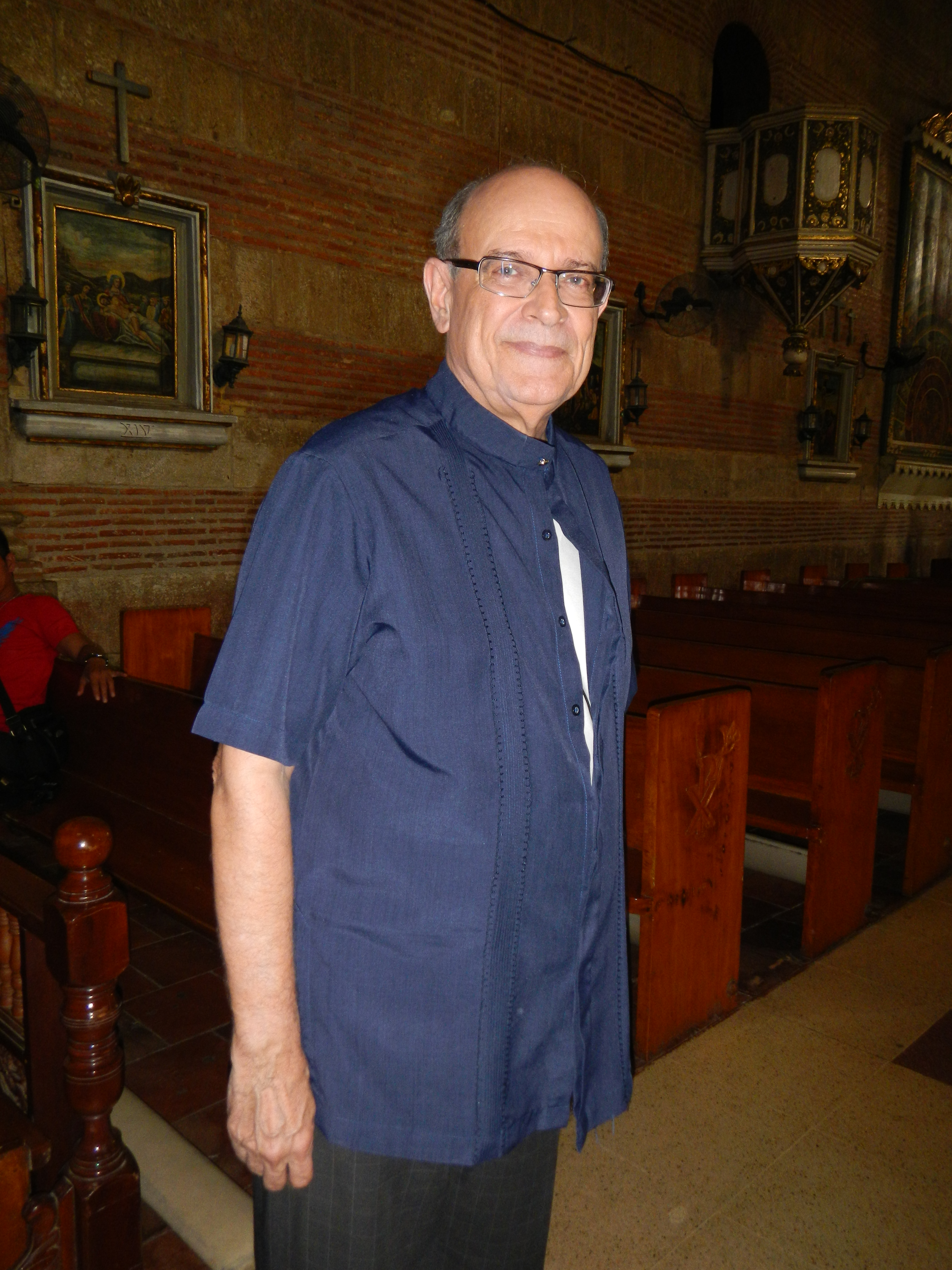
Jaime Fabregas, Best Music winner.

Best Film	Best Director
None (Note: The following categories are not given: "Best Picture", "Second Best Picture", "Third Best Picture", "Best Director", "Best Screenplay", "Gatpuno Antonio J. Villegas Cultural Awards".)	None
Best Actor	Best Actress
**Roi Vinzon – Lucas Abelardo**	**Kimberly Diaz – Kanto Boy 2: Anak ni Totoy Guapo**
Best Supporting Actor	Best Supporting Actress
**Dick Israel – Kanto Boy 2: Anak ni Totoy Guapo**	**Teresa Loyzaga – Lucas Abelardo**
Best Art Direction	Best Cinematography
**Ben Payumo – Ang Pagbabalik ni Pedro Penduko**	**Ben Lobo - Ang Pagbabalik ni Pedro Penduko**
Best Child Performer	Best Editing
**Tom Taus, Jr. – Shake, Rattle & Roll V**	**Renato de Leon - Lucas Abelardo**
Best Story	Best Screenplay
**Jose "Kaka" Balagtas – Lucas Abelardo**	None
Best Original Song	Best Music
**Rey Magtoto – Lucas Abelardo**	**Jaime Fabregas - Kanto Boy 2: Anak ni Totoy Guapo**
Best Visual Effects	Best Make-up
**Cinemagic – Ang Pagbabalik ni Pedro Penduko**	**Rey Salamat – Ang Pagbabalik ni Pedro Penduko**
Best Sound Recording	Best Float
**Rolly Ruta - Lucas Abelardo**	**Ang Pagbabalik ni Pedro Penduko - VIVA Films**
Gatpuno Antonio J. Villegas Cultural Awards
None

== Multiple awards ==
Awards	Film
6	Lucas Abelardo
5	Ang Pagbabalik ni Pedro Penduko
3	Kanto Boy 2: Anak ni Totoy Guapo

== Ceremony information ==
=== Lack of award-winners ===
During the "Gabi ng Parangal" held in PICC, December 27 of Tuesday night, Alejandro Roces, chairman of the Board of Jurors announced that: "none of the entries was deserving". Therefore, the six major awards (Three Best Pictures, Gatpuno Antonio J. Villegas Cultural Awards, Best Director, and Best Screenplay) were not given. Manila Standard columnist Emil P. Jurado praised the jurors' decision not to give out the major awards, stating that "[u]nless and until our filmmakers raise their professional and moral standards, the festival serves no purpose."

== Notes ==
Preceded by 1993 Metro Manila Film Festival	Metro Manila Film Festival; 1994	Succeeded by 1995 Metro Manila Film Festival
