= Maging Sino Ka Man =

Maging Sino Ka Man may refer to:

- Maging Sino Ka Man, a 1979 Philippine song by Rey Valera
- Maging Sino Ka Man (film), a 1991 Philippine drama film
  - Maging Sino Ka Man (2023 TV series), a 2023 Philippine television series broadcast on GMA Network; television adaptation of the 1991 film
- Te Amo, Maging Sino Ka Man, a 2004 Philippine television series aired on GMA Network
- Maging Sino Ka Man (2006 TV series), a 2006 Philippine television series aired on ABS-CBN
  - Maging Sino Ka Man: Ang Pagbabalik, a 2007 Philippine television series aired on ABS-CBN; the sequel to the 2006 series
