= Dugo ng Pusakal =

1988 Filipino film starring Anthony Alonzo

- Directed by: Manuel 'Fyke' Cinco
- Written by: Jose N. Carreon; Jojo Lapus
- Produced by: Arthur Ong; Patrick Lay
- Starring: Anthony Alonzo; Eddie Rodriguez; Jean Saburit; Dante Rivero; Paquito Diaz; Romy Diaz; Zandro Zamora
- Cinematography: Edmund Cupcupin
- Edited by: Rogelio Salvador
- Music by: Marita Manuel
- Production company: Filipinas Productions
- Distributed by: Filipinas Productions
- Release date: October 27, 1988
- Country: Philippines
- Language: Filipino

Dugo ng Pusakal (transl. Blood of the Criminal) is a 1988 Filipino action drama film directed by Manuel 'Fyke' Cinco. The film stars Anthony Alonzo, Eddie Rodriguez, Jean Saburit, Dante Rivero, Paquito Diaz, Romy Diaz, Zandro Zamora, Lito Anzures, Mon Godiz, and Dick Israel. Produced by Filipinas Productions, it was released on October 27, 1988, as part of the Chamber of Progressive Filipino Motion Picture Producers Film Festival.

Critic Lav Diaz gave Dugo ng Pusakal a mixed review, stating that the film's numerous forced scenes lessened the quality of its focus on character psychology. Diaz would later become the co-writer for Cinco's 1993 film Galvez: Hanggang sa Dulo ng Mundo Hahanapin Kita.

== Cast ==
- Anthony Alonzo as Karlo
- Eddie Rodriguez as Judge Palma
- Jean Saburit as Teresa
- Dante Rivero
- Paquito Diaz
- Romy Diaz
- Zandro Zamora
- Lito Anzures
- Mon Godiz as Edgar
- Dick Israel as Marco
- Baldo Marro
- Gwen Manalo
- Rachell Lobangco
- Ernie Forte
- Romy Romulo
- Joey Padilla
- Rene Matias
- Danny Labra
- Vic Belaro
- Nonoy de Guzman
- Eddie Tuazon
- Rey Solo

== Release ==
Dugo ng Pusakal was graded "A" by the Movie and Television Review and Classification Board (MTRCB), indicating a "Very Good" quality. The film was released on October 27, 1988, as Filipinas Productions' entry to the Chamber of Progressive Filipino Motion Picture Producers Film Festival.

=== Critical response ===
Lav Diaz, writing for the Manila Standard, gave the film a mixed review. Diaz commended its focus on the psychological effects of violence similar to the action films Boy Negro and Sandakot Na Bala, the latter also written by Jose N. Carreon, but stated that Dugo ng Pusakal does not reach the level of those works, its quality diluted from having too many "forced and clumsy situations." Diaz would later co-write the screenplay to director Manuel Cinco's 1993 film Galvez: Hanggang sa Dulo ng Mundo Hahanapin Kita.
