= Kodaka =

Kodaka (written: 小高 or こだか in hiragana) is a Japanese surname. Notable people with the surname include:

- Isami Kodaka (木高 イサミ, born 1981), Japanese professional wrestler
- Kazuma Kodaka (こだか 和麻, born 1969), Japanese manga artist
- Kazutaka Kodaka (小高 和剛, born 1978), Japanese video game writer
- Naoki Kodaka (小高 直樹), Japanese video game composer
- Nina Kodaka (小高 ニーナ, born 1989), Japanese television personality

== See also ==
- Kodaka Hasegawa (羽瀬川 小鷹), protagonist of the light novel series Boku wa Tomodachi ga Sukunai
