= Eddie Rodriguez =

Filipino film actor and director (1932-2001)

- Born: Luis Clemente Enriquez; August 23, 1932; Zamboanga City, Zamboanga, Philippine Islands
- Died: October 12, 2001 (aged 69); Pasig, Philippines
- Other name: Ka Eddie
- Occupations: Producer, actor, director
- Years active: 1955–1997
- Spouse: Araceli Hernandez
- Children: 3

Luis Clemente Enriquez (August 23, 1932 – October 12, 2001), better known by his stage name Eddie Rodriguez, was a Filipino film actor and director.

== Early life ==
Enriquez was born on August 23, 1932, in Zamboanga City. He spent his childhood and teen years in Sta. Ana, Manila. During the Japanese occupation, with his parents and two siblings, he moved temporarily to Ragay, Camarines Sur which was the birthplace of his mother, Rufina Clemente-Enriquez.

== Personal life ==
In the 1970s, Rodriguez was in a relationship with Carmen Soriano, a popular Filipino singer. He was married to Araceli Hernandez with 3 children: Sheena Natassha H. Enriquez (born 1985), Dominique Louise Enriquez, and Bianca H. Enriquez.

== Career ==
With his wife, the actress Liza Moreno (Louise de Mesa), the couple formed Virgo Film Productions. Rodriguez was paired with practically all the queens of Philippine movies from Gloria Romero, Nida Blanca, Rita Gomez, Charito Solis, Amalia Fuentes, Nora Aunor and Vilma Santos.

He directed Sharon Cuneta‚ and megablockbuster Maging Sino Ka Man with Robin Padilla.

Rodriguez was rumored to have an illness before, and reportedly became an alcoholic.

He started as an action star before turning to drama, where he became more popular.

He was remembered for his films Sapagkat Kami ay Tao Lamang, Kapag Puso Ay Sinugatan, Malupit Na Pag-ibig and Nakakahiya Part 1 and 2.

He was posthumously inducted to the Philippines Eastwood City Walk of Fame in 2006.

== Death ==
Rodriguez died of cardiac arrest on October 12, 2001, at 11:30 pm at The Medical City, Pasig. According to his daughter Sheena, her father had suffered lung cancer several years prior and one of his lungs had to be surgically removed.

== Filmography ==
=== Actor ===
Year	Title	Role
1955	Talusaling	Marcial
1955	Higit sa Lahat	Gorio
1956	Child of Sorrow	Eddie
1956	Luksang Tagumpay	
1957	Sanga-Sangang Puso	
1957	Sampung Libong Pisong Pag-Ibig	
1958	Malvarosa	Avelino
1958	Villa Milagrosa	
1958	Rose Tattoo ng Buhay Ko	
1959	Kundiman ng Lahi	Tonyo
1960	Emily	
1960	Teenage Crush	
1960	Tres Mosqueteros	
1961	Tatlong Baraha	
1961	Tacio	
1962	Kapitan Tornado	
1962	Digmaan ng Mga Maton	
1962	Sarah Sollente	
1962	Anting-Anting Daw	
1963	Magtiis Ka, Darling	
1963	Isinusumpa Ko!	
1963	3 Mukha ni Pandora	
1963	Sapagkat Kami'y Tao Lamang	
1963	Tiger Unit	
1964	Target Max	Secret Agent Ace
1964	Scout Brothers	
1964	Bandong Pugante	
1964	Mamatay sa Laban	
1964	Alias Cruz Matador	
1964	Salambao	
1964	Tres Bravos	
1964	Sa Kuko ng Lawin	
1965	Mila Rosa	
1965	Kay Tagal ng Umaga	
1966	Saan Ka Man Naroroon	
1966	Cobra	Cobra
1966	Ang Iniluluha Ko'y Dugo	
1966	Hindi Nahahati ang Langit	
1966	Itinakwil Man Kita	
1967	The Jokers	Cobra
1967	O! Pagsintang Labis	
1967	Kapag Puso'y Sinugatan	
1967	The Kingpin	Cobra
1967	Somewhere My Love	
1968	Sino ang May Karapatan?	
1968	Siete Dolores	
1968	Oh! My Papa	Miguel
1968	Mga Tigre sa Looban	
1968	Kasalanan Kaya?	
1968	Joe Domino	Joe Domino
1968	El Perro Gancho	
1968	Dear Kuya Cesar	
1969	Ikaw	
1969	Gumuho Man ang Langit!	
1970	Mga Hagibis	
1970	Pagkakamali Ba?	
1970	Bakit Ako Pa?	
1970	My Little Angel	
1970	Santa Teresa Da Avila	
1971	Binili Ko ang Aking Asawa	
1971	Anak sa Labas	
1971	Kapantay ay Langit	
1972	As Long as Forever	
1972	Anghel ng Pag-Ibig	
1972	Mahalin Mo Sana Ako	
1972	Babae... Ikaw ang Dahilan!	
1972	Kung Bakit Kita Minahal	
1973	Lalaki, Kasalanan Mo	
1973	Ito ang Aming Kasunduan	
1973	Sino?	
1973	Pag-Ibig Mo, Buhay Ko	
1973	Hanggang sa Kabila ng Daigdig: The Tony Marquez Story	
1974	Minsan May Isang Pag-Ibig	
1974	Alaala Mo Daigdig Ko	
1974	Limbas Squadron	
1975	May Lalaki sa Ilalim ng Kama Ko	
1975	Nakakahiya	
1975	Gumapang Ka sa Lupa	
1976	Kaliwa't Kanan... Sakit ng Katawan	
1976	Huwag Mong Kunin ang Lahat sa Akin	
1976	Hindi Nakakahiya (Part II)	
1976	Mahirap Palang Magpalaki ng Asawa	
1976	Bakit Ako Mahihiya?	
1977	Halikan Mo at Magpaalam sa Kahapon	
1977	Pag-Ibig Ko'y Awitin Mo	
1977	Malayo Man... Malapit Din!	
1977	Binata ang Daddy Ko!	Teddy Ver
1977	Huwag Pipitas ng Bubot Na Bunga	
1978	Hatiin Natin ang Gabi	
1978	Simula ng Walang Katapusan	
1978	Ligaya Mo ay Kasawian Ko	
1978	Mga Mata ni Angelita	Father M. Domingo
1979	High School Circa '65	
1979	Gabun: Ama Mo, Ama Ko	
1979	Halik sa Paa, Halik sa Kamay	
1979	Gabun	
1980	Salamat Kapatid Ko!	
1980	Evening Class	
1980	Sampaguitang Walang Halimuyak	
1981	Ang Babaeng Hinugot sa Aking Tadyang	Homero
1981	Flor de Liza	
1981	Dirty Games	
1981	Hiwalay	
1982	Where Love Has Gone	Jake
1982	Magkano ang Kalayaan Mo?	
1983	Babaeng Selyado	
1983	Kasal o Asawa	
1984	Ibulong Mo sa Puso	
1984	Tender Age	
1984	Paano Ba ang Magmahal?	
1984	Bukas Luluhod ang Mga Tala	
1984	Bigats	
1984	Life Begins at 40	
1985	Bulaklak ng Magdamag	Don Manuel
1985	Ano Ka, Hilo?	
1985	Mga Paru-Parong Buking	Oscar
1985	Pahiram ng Ligaya	
1985	Moomoo	
1985	Kailan Sasabihing Mahal Kita	Bob Sevilla
1985	Turuang Apoy	
1986	Payaso	
1988	Hati Tayo sa Magdamag	Don Teofilo Revilla
1988	Guhit ng Palad	
1988	Dugo ng Pusakal	
1989	Ang Lahat ng Ito Pati Na ang Langit	
1989	Punglo Bawat Hakbang	
1990	Higit Na Matimbang ang Dugo	
1990	Anak ni Baby Ama	
1990	Ayaw Matulog ng Gabi	
1990	Secrets of Pura	
1991	Ganti ng Api	Anselmo
1991	Bingbong: The Vincent Crisologo Story	Congressman Floro Crisologo II
1992	Bakit Ako Mahihiya?	
1992	Your Dream Is Mine	
1992	Magnong Rehas	Police investigator
1993	The Myrna Diones Story (Lord, Have Mercy!)	
1993	Paranaque Bank Robbery: The Joselito Joseco Story	
1993	Abel Morado: Ikaw ang May Sala	
1993	Dalawa Laban sa Mundo: Ang Siga at ang Beauty	Ric's Father
1994	Oo Na, Sige Na!	Don Perfecto
1994	Nagkataon, Nagkatagpo	Mang Piryong
1994	Binibini ng Aking Panaginip	
1994	Separada	Melissa's daddy
1995	Batas Ko ang Katapat Mo	General
1996	Adan Lazaro	Col. Roque
1996	Dead Sure	Lawyer
1996	Wag na Wag Kang Lalayo	Superintendent

=== Director ===
Year	Title
1966	Dalaga Mayor
1968	Kasalanan Kaya?
1968	El Perro Gancho
1968	Siete Dolores
1969	Gumuho Man ang Langit!
1969	Ikaw
1970	Mga Hagibis
1970	Pagkakamali Ba?
1970	Bakit Ako Pa?
1970	Ah, Ewan! Basta sa Maynila Pa Rin Ako!
1970	Pritil
1971	Anak sa Labas
1970	Kapantay ay Langit
1972	As Long as Forever
1972	Mahalin Mo Sana Ako
1972	Babae... Ikaw ang Dahilan!
1973	Ikaw Lamang
1973	Lalaki, Kasalanan Mo
1973	Pag-Ibig Mo, Buhay Ko
1974	Alaala Mo Daigdig Ko
1975	Nakakahiya 1
1976	Hindi Nakakahiya Part II
1976	Mahirap Palang Magpalaki ng Asawa
1977	Halikan Mo at Magpaalam sa Kahapon
1977	Pag-Ibig Ko'y Awitin Mo
1977	Malayo Man, Malapit Din!
1977	Huwag Pipitas ng Bubot na Bunga
1978	Simula ng Walang Katapusan
1979	Halik sa Paa, Halik sa Kamay
1980	Ex-Wife
1980	Salamat Kapatid Ko!
1980	Unang Yakap
1981	Nakakabaliw, Nakakaaliw
1981	Init o Lamig
1982	Malikot
1985	Turuang Apoy
1989	Bakit Iisa Lamang ang Puso?
1989	Abot Hanggang Sukdulan
1989	Ang Babaeng Nawawala sa Sarili
1990	Kolehiyala
1990	Bad Boy
1991	Maging Sino Ka Man
1991	Boyong Mañalac: Hoodlum Terminator
1992	Grease Gun Gang
1993	Sana'y Ikaw Na Nga
1993	Kung Kailangan Mo Ako
1993	Di na Natuto (Sorry na, Puwede Ba?)
1994	Markadong Hudas
1994	Megamol
1995	Iligpit si Bobby Ortega: Markang Bungo 2
1995	Minsan Pa: Kahit Konting Pagtingin Part 2
1997	Hanggang Dito Na Lang
1999	Bilib Ako Sa'yo

=== Story ===
Year	Title
1966	Cobra
1967	The Jokers
1967	The Kingpin
1968	Mga Tigre sa Looban
1970	Mga Hagibis
1970	Pagkakamali Ba?
1970	Pritil
1970	Binili Ko ang Aking Asawa
1971	Anak sa Labas
1972	As Long as Forever
1973	Lalaki, Kasalanan Mo
1973	Pag-Ibig Mo, Buhay Ko
1989	Bakit Iisa Lamang Ang Puso?
1991	Maging Sino Ka Man
1991	Darna
1993	Di Na Natuto (Sorry na, Puwede Ba?)
1995	Iligpit si Bobby Ortega: Markang Bungo 2
1999	Bilib Ako Sa'yo

=== Screenplay ===
Year	Title
1966	Cobra
1967	The Jokers
1967	The Kingpin
1970	Mga Hagibis
1970	Pagkakamali Ba?
1970	Ah, Ewan! Basta sa Maynila Pa Rin Ako!
1970	Pritil
1970	Binili Ko ang Aking Asawa
1971	Anak sa Labas
1972	As Long as Forever
1972	Mahalin Mo Sana Ako
1972	Babae, Ikaw ang Dahilan!
1973	Lalaki, Kasalanan Mo
1973	Pag-Ibig Mo, Buhay Ko
1980	Unang Yakap
1982	Malikot
1989	Ang Babaeng Nawawala sa Sarili
1991	Maging Sino Ka Man
1991	Boyong Mañalac: Hoodlum Terminator
1993	Di Na Natuto (Sorry Na, Puwede Ba?)
1995	Iligpit si Bobby Ortega: Markang Bungo 2
1999	Bilib Ako Sa'yo

=== Writer ===
Year	Title
1970	Bakit Ako Pa?
1973	Ikaw Lamang
1979	Halik sa Paa, Halik sa Kamay
1990	Kolehiyala
1993	Sana'y Ikaw na Nga
1994	Megamol
