= 1998 Makati local elections =

2nd City elections in Makati

1998 Makati mayoral election
- May 11, 1998
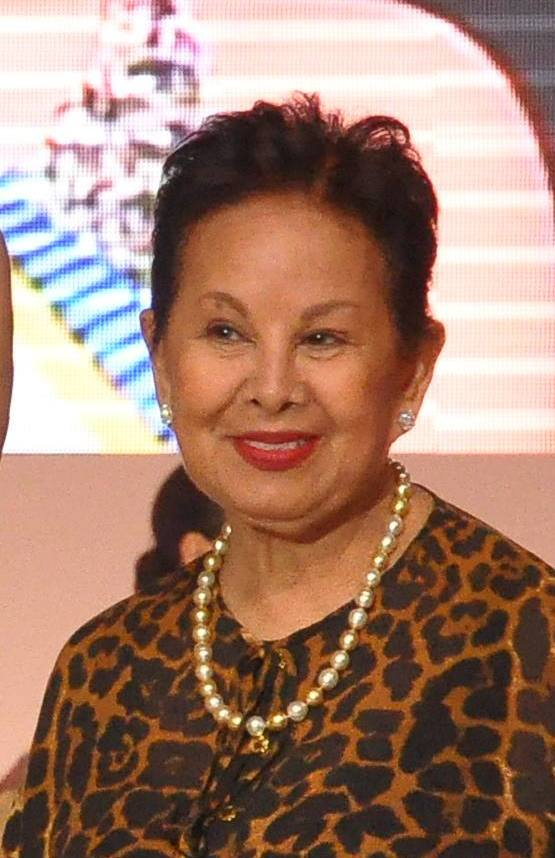

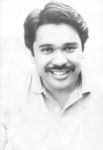

| Nominee | Elenita Binay | Arturo "Toro" S. Yabut III | Nelson Irasga |
| Party | PDP–Laban | Lakas | Liberal |
| Alliance | Performance Team | Team Batang Makati | Team Irasga-Manzano |
| Running mate | Ernesto S. Mercado | Gabriel "Bong" Daza III | Edu Manzano |
| Popular vote | 147,865 | 92,947 | 21,725 |
| Percentage | 56.08 | 35.25 | 8.24 |
| Nominee | Alexander Villalon | Cesar C. Alzona |
| Party | Independent | Reporma |
| Alliance | | Team Bambi-Bobby-Cesar |
| Popular vote | 591 | 518 |
| Percentage | 0.22 | 0.20 |
Mayor before election
Jejomar Binay
PDP–Laban
Elected mayor
Elenita Binay
PDP–Laban
- Vice mayoral election
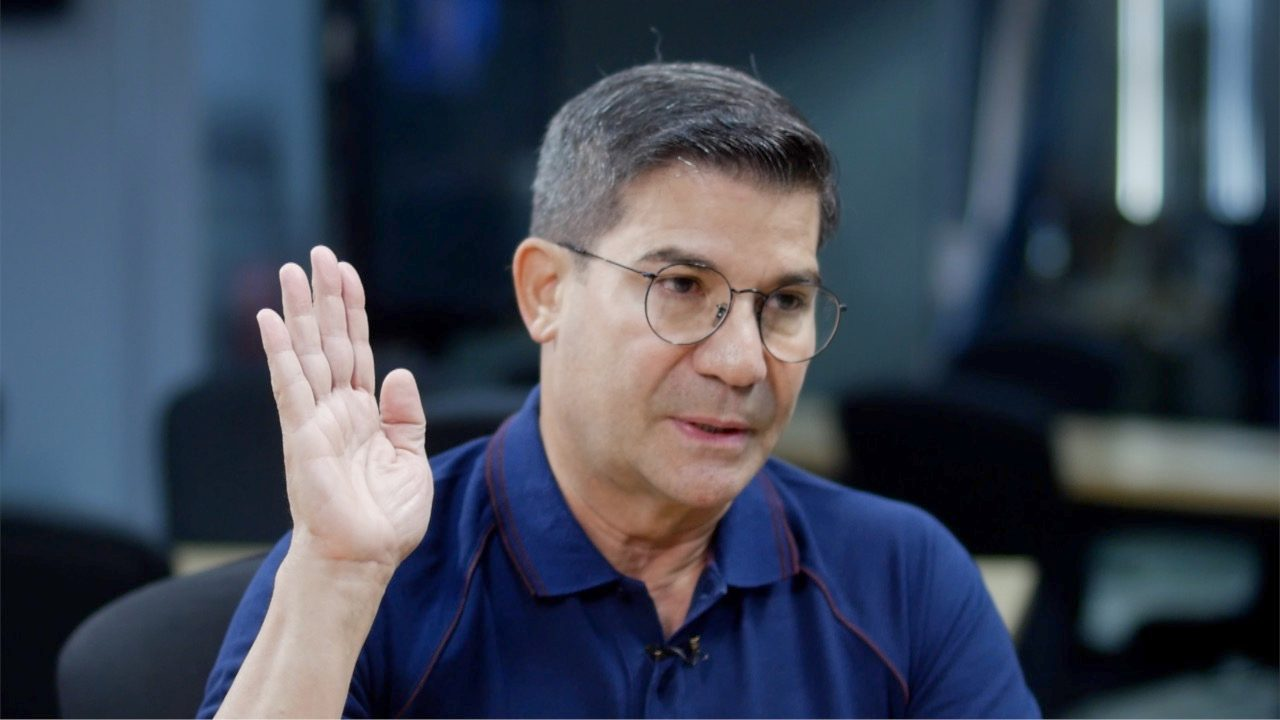

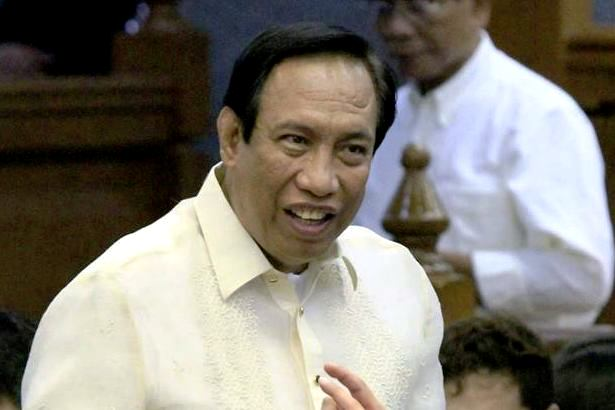

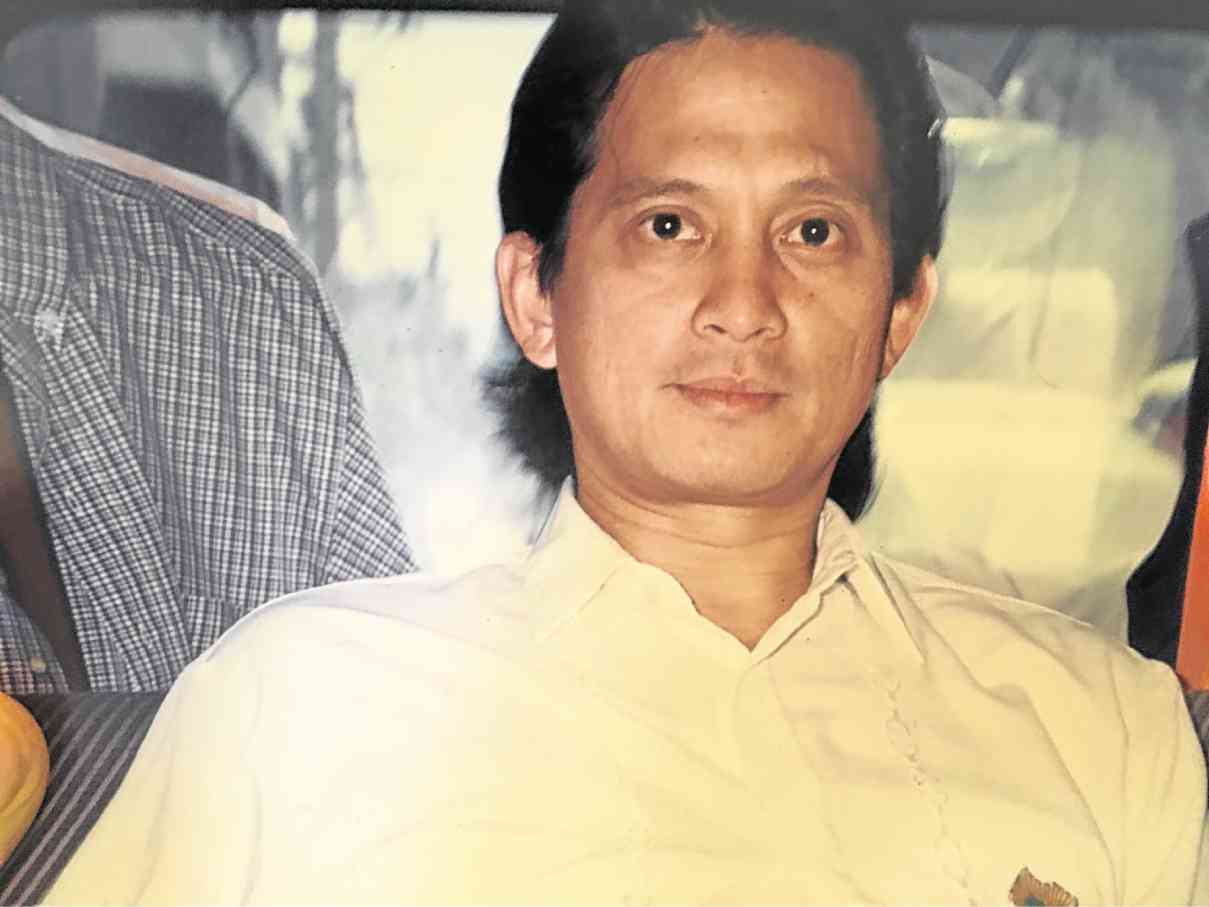
| Candidate | Edu Manzano | Ernesto S. Mercado | Gabriel "Bong" Daza III |
| Party | Liberal | PDP–Laban | Lakas |
| Alliance | Team Irasga-Manzano | Performance Team | Team Batang Makati |
| Popular vote | 103,853 | 100,894 | 54,275 |
| Percentage | 40.09 | 38.95 | 20.95 |
Vice Mayor before election
Arturo S. Yabut
Lakas
Elected Vice Mayor
Edu Manzano
Liberal

Local elections was held in the City of Makati on May 11, 1998, within the Philippine general election. The voters elected for the elective local posts in the city: the mayor, vice mayor, the two congressmen, and the councilors, eight in each of the city's two legislative districts.

== Background ==
Incumbent mayor and PDP–Laban stalwart Jejomar Binay was term-limited and appointed as MMDA chairman. His wife, Dra. Elenita Binay, ran in his place. She selected 2nd district councilor Ernesto Mercado as her running-mate.

Binay's challengers were former city engineer Nelson Irasga of Liberal Party, incumbent vice mayor Arturo "Toro" Yabut of Lakas–NUCD, a member of the family who previously allied with the Binays, former acting mayor Cesar Alzona and 1984 assembly candidate Alexander Villalon.

For the vice-mayoralty, Mercado faced actor Edu Manzano and Councilor Bong Daza.

Iglesia ni Cristo endorsed Binay and Mercado.

== Citizenship of Manzano ==
Even Edu Manzano won the vice mayoral race, closest rival Ernesto Mercado filed a disqualification case against Manzano's dual citizenship, as Manzano is a citizen of the Philippines by blood and of the United States by birth. To prove his loyalty to the Philippines, Manzano tore his American passport at a press conference. Later, the Supreme Court dismissed the case. In 2019, while campaigning for congressman for San Juan, Metro Manila, Manzano faced another case the same as 1998.

== Candidates ==
=== Performance Team ===
PDP–Laban/Laban ng Makabayang Masang Pilipino/Aksyon Demokratiko/Laban ng Demokratikong Pilipino/Performance Team
| Name | Party |
For Mayor
| Elenita "Dra. Ellen" S. Binay | PDP–Laban |
For Vice Mayor
| Ernesto "Nestor" S. Mercado | PDP–Laban |
For House Of Representative (1st District)
| Ceferino "Joker" P. Arroyo Jr. | LAMMP |
For Councilor (1st District)
| Oscar M. Ibay | PDP–Laban |
| Ricardo "Ric" S. Javier | PDP–Laban |
| Ferdinand Jacinto "Ferdie Tangol" T. Eusebio | PDP–Laban |
| Meynardo L. Gonzales | Independent |
| Romeo "Romy" C. Medina | Aksyon |
| Victor T. Gomez Jr. | PDP–Laban |
| Josefina S. Vasquez | PDP–Laban |
| Hermenegildo "Hermie" C. San Miguel | PDP–Laban |
For House Of Representative (2nd District)
| Agapito "Butz" A. Aquino | LDP |
For Councilor (2nd District)
| Johnny S. Wilson | PDP–Laban |
| Pedro A. Ibay | PDP–Laban |
| Salvador "Buddy" D. Pangilinan | PDP–Laban |
| Nelson "Doc" S. Pasia | LAMMP |
| Divina "Divine" A. Jacome | PDP–Laban |
| Liberato "Levi" G. Siaron | PDP–Laban |
| Astolfo C. Pimentel | PDP–Laban |
| Jaime P. Padua | PDP–Laban |
| Virginia F. Blanca | PDP–Laban |
| Augusto B. Martinez Jr. | PDP–Laban |
| Eugenio C. Macababayao Jr. | PDP–Laban |

=== Team Batang Makati ===
Lakas-NUCD-UMDP/Nationalist People's Coalition/Team Batang Makati
| Name | Party |
For Mayor
| Nemesio Arturo "Toro" S. Yabut III | Lakas |
For Vice Mayor
| Gabriel "Bong" V. Daza III | Lakas |
For House Of Representative (1st District)
| Rose Marie Arenas | NPC |
For Councilor (1st District)
| Enrico "Rico J." Puno | Lakas |
| Robert Dean Barbers | Lakas |
| Mark P. Joseph | Lakas |
| Manuel A. Flores | Lakas |
| Renato "Rene" L. Bondal | Lakas |
| Joshua John C. Santiago | Lakas |
| Jose Fidel B. Coronel | Lakas |
| Nicolas "Nick" C. Enciso VI | Lakas |
For House Of Representative (2nd District)
| Antonio "Tony" G. Manalili | Lakas |
For Councilor (2nd District)
| AnaLuz "Atty. Luz" B. Cristal-Tenorio | Independent |
| Cirilo A. Maccay | Lakas |
| Israel "Boyet" S. Cruzado | Lakas |
| Nilda M. Ariones | Lakas |
| Alfredo N. Lapasaran | Lakas |
| Edgardo "Bong" C. Manibog | Lakas |
| Francisco U. Malabed Jr. | Lakas |
| Mischa Nicanor "Nick" B. Elman | Lakas |

=== Team Irasga-Manzano ===
Liberal Party/Team Irasga-Manzano
| Name | Party |
For Mayor
| Nelson Q. Irasga | Liberal |
For Vice Mayor
| Eduardo Luis "Edu" B. Manzano | Liberal |
For House Of Representative (1st District)
| Alfonso Mike G. Policarpio | Independent |
For Councilor (1st District)
| Aurora "Au" Pijuan | Liberal |
| Fernando P. Angara | Liberal |
| Mary Ann L. Susano | Liberal |
| Celerino L. Umandap | Liberal |
| Jay Fideli A. Francisco | Liberal |
| Pedro P. Dadula | Liberal |
| Amado G. de Vera III | Liberal |
| John Rex T. Tiu | Liberal |
For House Of Representative (2nd District)
| Billy Bibit | Independent |
For Councilor (2nd District)
| Teresita E. Javier | Liberal |
| Jason A. Maulit | Liberal |
| Danilo M. Pangan | Liberal |
| Eduardo E. Recometa | Liberal |
| Rolando "Rolly" T. Torrente | Liberal |
| Rodolfo "Rod" D. Biolena | Liberal |
| Ricardo D. Dicon | Liberal |
| Alfredo M. Ripoll | Liberal |

=== Team Bambi-Bobby-Cesar (Team BBC) ===
Partido para sa Demokratikong Reporma/Team Bambi-Bobby-Cesar (Team BBC)
| Name | Party |
For Mayor
| Cesar C. Alzona | Reporma |
For House Of Representative (1st District)
| Perfecto "Bambi" M. Santos | Reporma |
For Councilor (1st District)
| Felicisimo P. Bascon Jr. | Reporma |
| Domingo C. Cobalida Jr. | Reporma |
| Marco Luis V. Cabarloc | Reporma |
| Geoffrey Q. dela Torre | Independent |
| Jaime E. Aragon | Independent |
| Ernesto A. Ramos | Independent |
| Jose M. Caluag | Independent |
| Feliciano L. Basilio Jr. | Independent |
For House Of Representative (2nd District)
| Roberto "Bobby" G. Brillante Sr. | Reporma |
For Councilor (2nd District)
| Virgilio Y. Baluyut | Reporma |
| Eleuterio T. Tamayo Sr. | Reporma |
| Melquiades B. Agustin | Reporma |
| Eliseo C. Baldeviso | Reporma |

=== Independent Candidates ===
Independent
| Name | Party |
For Mayor
| Alexander J. Villalon | Independent |
For Councilor (1st District)
| Amado D. Castrillo | Independent |
| Jose Claro I. Swing | Independent |
| Jose A. Brozoto | Independent |
For Councilor (2nd District)
| Warren Anthony P. Sio I | Independent |

=== Other Non-Independent Candidates ===
PDP-Laban
For House Of Representative (1st District)
| Adelia J. Insauriga | PDP–Laban |

Kilusang Bagong Lipunan
For House Of Representative (2nd District)
| Ricardo O. Manila | KBL |

People's Reform Party
For Councilor (2nd District)
| Eduardo V. Hubbard | PRP |

== Results ==
=== Mayor ===
Dra. Elenita Binay won against incumbent vice mayor Arturo "Toro" Yabut, former mayor Cesar Alzona, City Engineer Nelson Irasga, and independent candidate Alexander Villalon.

1998 Makati mayoral election
| Candidate | Party | Votes | % |
|---|---|---|---|
| Elenita Binay | PDP–Laban/Laban ng Makabayang Masang Pilipino | 147,865 | 56.08 |
| Nemesio Arturo "Toro" Yabut III | Lakas–NUCD–UMDP | 92,947 | 35.25 |
| Nelson Irasga | Liberal Party | 21,725 | 8.24 |
| Alexander Villalon | Independent | 591 | 0.22 |
| Cesar Alzona | Partido para sa Demokratikong Reporma | 518 | 0.20 |
| Total | | 263,646 | 100.00 |
| PDP–Laban hold | | | |

=== Vice Mayor ===
Actor Edu Manzano won against 2nd district councilors Ernesto Mercado and Gabriel "Bong" Daza III.

1998 Makati vice mayoral election
| Candidate | Party | Votes | % |
|---|---|---|---|
| Edu Manzano | Liberal Party | 103,853 | 40.09 |
| Ernesto "Nestor" Mercado | PDP–Laban/Laban ng Makabayang Masang Pilipino | 100,894 | 38.95 |
| Gabriel "Bong" Daza III | Lakas–NUCD–UMDP | 54,275 | 20.95 |
| Total | | 259,022 | 100.00 |
| Liberal Party gain from Lakas–NUCD–UMDP | | | |

=== Makati's 1st district congressman ===
Incumbent Joker Arroyo of Laban ng Makabayang Masang Pilipino was re-elected to a third term.

| Candidate | Party | Votes | % |
|---|---|---|---|
| Joker Arroyo (incumbent) | Laban ng Makabayang Masang Pilipino | 91,269 | 70.94 |
| Rose Marie Arenas | Nationalist People's Coalition | 34,807 | 27.05 |
| Alfonso Mike Policarpio | Independent | 1,246 | 0.97 |
| Perfecto "Bambi" Santos | Partido para sa Demokratikong Reporma | 1,156 | 0.90 |
| Adelia Insauriga | PDP–Laban | 184 | 0.14 |
| Total | | 128,662 | 100.00 |
| Laban ng Makabayang Masang Pilipino hold | | | |
Source: Commission on Elections

=== Makati's 2nd district congressman ===
The seat was left vacant after Butz Aquino of Laban ng Demokratikong Pilipino, who received the most number of votes in the district in the 1995 election, was disqualified by the Commission on Elections on June 2, 1995, for lack of residency. Aquino ran in the 1998 election as the candidate of Laban ng Makabayang Masang Pilipino and won.

| Candidate | Party | Votes | % |
|---|---|---|---|
| Butz Aquino | Laban ng Makabayang Masang Pilipino/Laban ng Demokratikong Pilipino | 76,807 | 65.85 |
| Antonio "Tony" Manalili | Lakas–NUCD–UMDP | 19,971 | 17.12 |
| Roberto "Bobby" Brillante Sr. | Partido para sa Demokratikong Reporma | 10,334 | 8.86 |
| Billy Bibit | Independent | 9,232 | 7.92 |
| Ricardo Manila | Kilusang Bagong Lipunan | 294 | 0.25 |
| Total | | 116,638 | 100.00 |
| Laban ng Makabayang Masang Pilipino gain | | | |
Source: Commission on Elections

=== City Council ===
==== 1st District ====
Five of eight candidates of Binay-Mercado slate won the city council seats for this district.

City Council election at Makati's 1st district
| Party | Candidate | Votes | % |
|---|---|---|---|
| PDP–Laban | Oscar M. Ibay | 73,470 | |
| PDP–Laban | Ricardo "Ric" S. Javier | 61,876 | |
| PDP–Laban | Ferdinand Jacinto "Ferdie Tangol" T. Eusebio | 58,867 | |
| Independent | Meynardo L. Gonzales | 57,036 | |
| Lakas | Enrico "Rico J." Puno | 56,302 | |
| Aksyon | Romeo "Romy" C. Medina | 54,433 | |
| Lakas | Robert Dean Barbers | 54,185 | |
| Lakas | Mark P. Joseph | 51,366 | |
| PDP–Laban | Victor T. Gomez Jr. | 47,554 | |
| PDP–Laban | Josefina S. Vasquez | 46,854 | |
| PDP–Laban | Hermenegildo "Hermie" C. San Miguel | 46,500 | |
| Lakas | Manuel "Maning" A. Flores | 41,267 | |
| Lakas | Renato "Rene" L. Bondal | 38,208 | |
| Lakas | Joshua John C. Santiago | 34,426 | |
| Lakas | Jose Fidel B. Coronel | 32,665 | |
| Lakas | Nicolas "Nick" C. Enciso VI | 26,325 | |
| Liberal | Aurora "Au" Pijuan | 23,780 | |
| Liberal | Fernando P. Angara | 23,104 | |
| Liberal | Mary Ann L. Susano | 19,993 | |
| Liberal | Celerino L. Umandap | 8,752 | |
| Liberal | Jay Fideli A. Francisco | 7,934 | |
| Independent | Geoffrey Q. dela Torre | 7,850 | |
| Liberal | Pedro P. Dadula | 6,899 | |
| Liberal | Amado G. de Vera III | 6,617 | |
| Reporma | Felicisimo P. Bascon Jr. | 4,055 | |
| Liberal | John Rex T. Tiu | 3,731 | |
| Independent | Jaime E. Aragon | 3,726 | |
| Independent | Ernesto A. Ramos | 2,231 | |
| Independent | Jose M. Caluag | 2,098 | |
| Independent | Feliciano L. Basilio Jr. | 1,523 | |
| Reporma | Domingo C. Cobalida Jr. | 1,294 | |
| Independent | Amado D. Castrillo | 1,243 | |
| Reporma | Marco Luis V. Cabarloc | 1,236 | |
| Independent | Jose Carlo I. Swing | 775 | |
| Independent | Jose A. Brozoto | 670 | |
| Total votes | | | |

==== 2nd District ====
Seven of eight candidates of Binay-Mercado slate won the city council seats for this district.

City Council election at Makati's 2nd district
| Party | Candidate | Votes | % |
|---|---|---|---|
| PDP–Laban | Johnny S. Wilson | 73,484 | |
| PDP–Laban | Pedro A. Ibay | 67,955 | |
| PDP–Laban | Salvador "Buddy" D. Pangilinan | 65,229 | |
| LAMMP | Nelson "Doc" S. Pasia | 63,348 | |
| Independent | AnaLuz "Atty. Luz" B. Cristal-Tenorio | 56,211 | |
| PDP–Laban | Divina 'Divine" A. Jacome | 55,553 | |
| PDP–Laban | Liberato "Levi" G. Siaron | 54,808 | |
| PDP–Laban | Astolfo C. Pimentel | 50,327 | |
| Lakas | Cirilo A. Maccay | 44,082 | |
| Lakas | Israel "Boyet" S. Cruzado | 31,673 | |
| Lakas | Nilda M. Ariones | 28,677 | |
| Lakas | Alfredo N. Lapasaran | 25,651 | |
| Lakas | Edgardo "Bong" C. Manibog | 23,985 | |
| Lakas | Francisco U. Malabed Jr. | 21,738 | |
| Lakas | Mischa Nicanor "Nick' B. Elman | 20,472 | |
| Reporma | Virgilio Y. Baluyut | 19,460 | |
| Liberal | Teresita E. Javier | 13,959 | |
| Liberal | Jason A. Maulit | 12,244 | |
| Liberal | Danilo M. Pangan | 12,080 | |
| Liberal | Eduardo E. Recometa | 12,029 | |
| Liberal | Rolando "Rolly" T. Torrente | 10,751 | |
| Reporma | Eleuterio T. Tamayo Sr. | 9,118 | |
| Liberal | Rodolfo "Rod" D. Biolena | 7,136 | |
| Liberal | Ricardo D. Dicon | 7,086 | |
| Reporma | Melquiades B. Agustin | 6,733 | |
| PDP–Laban | Jaime P. Padua | 4,461 | |
| Liberal | Alfredo M. Ripoll | 3,772 | |
| Reporma | Eliseo C. Baldeviso | 3,655 | |
| PDP–Laban | Virginia F. Blanca | 3,638 | |
| PDP–Laban | Augusto B. Martinez Jr. | 2,488 | |
| PDP–Laban | Eugenio C. Macababayao Jr. | 1,402 | |
| PRP | Eduardo V. Hubbard | 815 | |
| Independent | Warren Anthony P. Sio I | 549 | |
