= Megamol =

1994 Filipino comedy film

- Theatrical release poster
- Directed by: Eddie Rodriguez
- Written by: Eddie Rodriguez; Humilde "Meek" Roxas
- Produced by: William C. Leary
- Starring: Sharon Cuneta; Andrew E.
- Cinematography: Carding Herrera
- Edited by: Ike Jarlego, Jr.; Marya Ignacio
- Music by: Dennis Garcia
- Production company: Viva Films
- Distributed by: Viva Films
- Release date: August 3, 1994 (Philippines)
- Running time: 105 minutes
- Country: Philippines
- Language: Filipino

Megamol is a 1994 Philippine comedy film co-written and directed by Eddie Rodriguez. The film stars Sharon Cuneta and Andrew E. The film's title is a play on SM Megamall and is a portmanteau of the lead stars' respective nicknames Mega and Gamol.

The film is streaming online on YouTube.

== Plot ==
Set on a road-trip narrative, Corazon (Sharon Cuneta) and Clark (Andrew E.) embark on a chaotic road trip across Metro Manila while fleeing from kidnappers led by Brando (Bong Alvarez). After a confrontation in a Jollibee restaurant, they escape to Clark's home, where his cousin Bugoy (Smokey Manaloto) and Neneng (Maybelline dela Cruz) live. The kidnappers track them down after recognizing Bugoy’s pick-up truck at a gas station, forcing Clark and Corazon to return to Manila for help. With assistance from Clark's boss, Mr. Calderon (Jon Achaval), and an attorney (Charito Solis), they manage to defeat the kidnappers. It is revealed that Elias (Andy Poe), the mastermind behind the kidnapping, orchestrated the plot for financial gain, but is ultimately exposed and arrested by his wife, Marga (Gloria Sevilla). In the end, Corazon and Clark become wealthy.

== Cast ==
- Sharon Cuneta as Cora
- Andrew E. as Clark
- Charito Solis as Atty. Isabel Enriquez
- Gloria Sevilla as Marga
- Andy Poe as Elias
- Smokey Manaloto as Bugoy
- Bong Alvarez as Brando
- Marjorie Barretto as Gilda
- Michael Vera Perez as Mike
- Kate Gomez as Kate
- Melissa Gibbs as Mel
- Janine Barredo as Brando's Girl
- Maybelyn as Neneng
- Gil Baltazar as Kidnap Victim
- Philip Gamboa as Military General
- Jon Achaval as Mr. Calderon
