= Asar Talo Lahat Panalo! =

2010 Philippine television game show

- Title card
- Genre: Game show
- Directed by: Bert de Leon
- Presented by: Edu Manzano; Ellen Adarna; Nina Kodaka
- Country of origin: Philippines
- Original language: Tagalog
- No. of episodes: 55

Production
- Executive producer: Wilma Galvante
- Camera setup: Multiple-camera setup
- Running time: 60 minutes
- Production company: GMA Entertainment TV

Original release
- Network: GMA Network
- Release: September 18 – November 20, 2010

Asar Talo Lahat Panalo! (transl. annoyed loser everybody wins!) is a 2010 Philippine television game show broadcast by GMA Network. Directed by Bert de Leon, it is hosted by Edu Manzano. It premiered on September 18, 2010. The show concluded on November 20, 2010, with a total of 55 episodes.

== Hosts ==
- Edu Manzano
- Nina Kodaka
- Ellen Adarna

== Format ==
Asar Talo Lahat Panalo is a game show, it gives the contestants the chance to bring home big cash prizes if the contestant called the Bida survives the barrage of heckling from the Kontrabidas known as the Sulsuleros. A celebrity guest will act as the head heckler who will be called Kapitan Kontra.

== Ratings ==
According to AGB Nielsen Philippines' Mega Manila People/Individual television ratings, the pilot episode of Asar Talo Lahat Panalo! earned a 6.4% rating. The final episode scored a 3.8% rating.

== Accolades ==
Accolades received by Asar Talo Lahat Panalo!
Year	Award	Category	Recipient	Result	Ref.
2011	25th PMPC Star Awards for Television	Best Game Show	Asar Talo Lahat Panalo!	Nominated	
2011	25th PMPC Star Awards for Television	Best Game Show Host	Edu Manzano	Nominated	
