= Elenita Binay =

Filipina politician

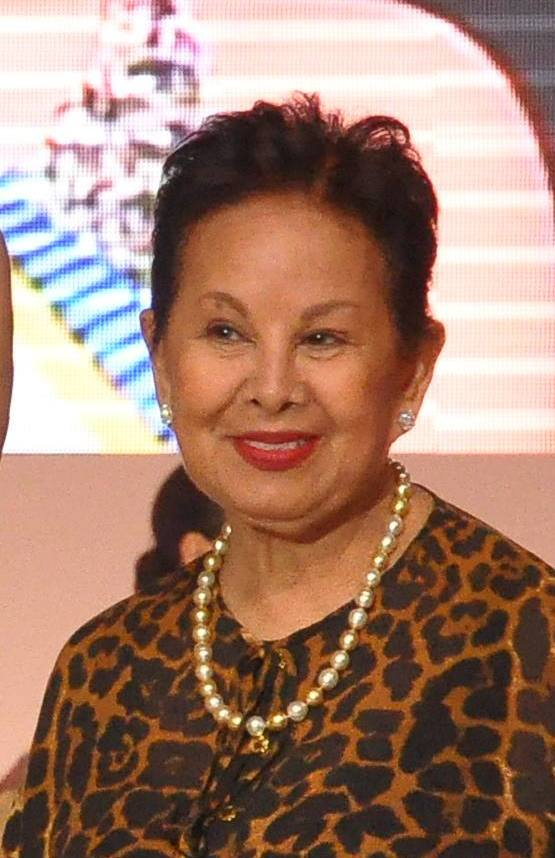
- Binay in July 2013

18th Mayor of Makati
- In office June 30, 1998 – June 30, 2001
- Vice Mayor: Edu Manzano
- Preceded by: Jejomar Binay
- Succeeded by: Jejomar Binay

Personal details
- Born: Elenita Gabriel Sombillo; November 9, 1943 (age 82) Angat, Bulacan, Philippine Commonwealth
- Party: PDP–Laban (1998–2001); LAMMP (1998)
- Spouse: Jejomar Binay (m. 1972)
- Children: 5 (inc. Nancy, Abigail, and Jejomar Jr.)
- Education: Manila Central University
- Occupation: Politician
- Profession: Physician (Obstetrician-Gynecologist)

Elenita "Ellen" Sombillo Binay (born Elenita Gabriel Sombillo; November 9, 1943) is a Filipina politician and physician. She served as mayor of Makati from 1998 to 2001. She is married to former Vice President Jejomar Binay. She is the mother of Makati Mayors Jejomar "Junjun" Binay, Jr., Abigail Binay, and Nancy Binay, who is also a former senator.

== Early life and education ==
Elenita Gabriel Sombillo was born on November 9, 1943, in Angat, Bulacan to Faustino Sombillo, a former vice mayor of the said town, and Loreto Gabriel. His father also owned a construction company, while her mother had an embroidery export business. Having been orphaned early, she worked odd jobs like taking care of a relative's poultry, going to the market, and learning to type papers as she was determined to complete her studies. She took up medicine at Manila Central University. She then worked as a resident physician and OB-GYN at José R. Reyes Memorial Medical Center.

== Political career ==
Elenita Binay, though employed as a medical practitioner, ran and won as mayor of Makati after her husband Jejomar Binay vacated the post due to term limits. She became the first female mayor of Makati, serving from 1998 to 2001. She chose not to seek re-election in 2001, allowing her husband to run for mayor again.

=== Corruption charges ===
Binay's (and private businessmen Li Yee Shing, Jason Li and Vivian M. Edurise, and Ernesto Aspillaga's) arraignment for graft charges was set by the Sandiganbayan's 4th Division on January 18, 2008. Binay was charged of alleged anomalous purchase of office fixtures and furniture for the new Makati City Hall from private contractor Office Gallery International from December 1999 to February 2000, regarding the acquisitions worth ₱13.25 million overpriced by ₱3.6 million. Binay was acquitted of two charges in 2021.

Binay faced charges of plunder, graft, and malversation for the purchase of ₱9.9 million medical equipment for Ospital ng Makati without public bidding during her term as mayor. The alleged falsification of purchase documents in 2000 and 2001 was also part of the accusations. She was acquitted by the Sandiganbayan in January 2024, which cited the prosecution's failure in proving her guilt beyond reasonable doubt; two of her co-accused were otherwise convicted by the court.

== Electoral history ==
1998 Makati mayoral election
Candidate	Party	Votes	%
Elenita Binay	Laban ng Makabayang Masang Pilipino	147,865	56.08
Arturo Yabut	Lakas–NUCD–UMDP	92,947	35.25
Nelson Irasga	Liberal Party	21,725	8.24
Alexander Villalon	Independent	591	0.22
Cesar Alzona	Independent	518	0.20
Total		263,646	100.00
Laban ng Makabayang Masang Pilipino gain from PDP–Laban			

== Personal life ==
Elenita Sombillo met human rights lawyer Jejomar Binay while she was working at the José R. Reyes Memorial Medical Center, with Binay then representing the DT Law Office in the hospital's court case. They later got married in July 1972, just before the declaration of martial law in September. They have five children:

- Maria Lourdes Nancy (Nancy, born May 12, 1973), married to Jose Benjamin Angeles, with four children
- Mar-len Abigail (Abby, born December 12, 1975), married to Luis Jose Angel Campos Jr., with one child (Martina)
- Jejomar Erwin Jr. (Junjun, born July 12, 1977), married to Patricia Sandejas, previously a widower of Kennely Ann Lacia, with four children (Jejomarie Alexi, Maria Isabel, Jejomar III, and Maria Kennely)
- Marita Angeline (Anne, born May 12, 1979), married to Don Alcantara, with four children
- Joanna Marie Blanca (born November 22, 1988)

Political offices
Preceded by Jejomar Binay	Mayor of Makati; 1998–2001	Succeeded by Jejomar Binay
