= Markadong Hudas =

Philippine action drama film

- Directed by: Eddie Rodriguez
- Screenplay by: Henry Nadong; Eddie Rodriguez
- Story by: Carlo J. Caparas
- Produced by: William Leary
- Starring: Cesar Montano
- Cinematography: Ricardo Herrera
- Edited by: Ike Jarlego Jr.
- Music by: Nonong Buencamino
- Production company: Viva Films
- Distributed by: Viva Films
- Release date: April 21, 1994
- Running time: 95 minutes
- Country: Philippines
- Language: Filipino

Markadong Hudas (lit. Judas Marked) is a 1994 Philippine action film directed by Eddie Rodriguez. The film stars Cesar Montano as the title role.

The film is streaming online on YouTube.

== Cast ==
- Cesar Montano as Daniel Braganza
- Dina Bonnevie as Rodelina Vergado
- Jun Aristorenas as Don Gonzalo Vergado
- Daniel Fernando as Col. Manolo Nantes
- Teresa Loyzaga as Myrna
- Berting Labra as Berto
- Chin-Chin Rodriguez as Rea
- Dick Israel as Olivares
- Ernie Zarate as Col. Romero
- Johnny Vicar as Mr. Taningco
- Marco Polo Garcia as Rizaldy
- Rommel Montano as Rizaldy's Brother
- Joey Padilla as Jake
- Romy Romulo as Oca
- Boy Roque as Brando
