= Ang Pagbabalik ni Pedro Penduko =

Philippine comedy fantasy film

- Directed by: J. Erastheo Navoa
- Screenplay by: Ely Matawaran; J. Erastheo Navoa
- Based on: Pedro Penduko by Francisco V. Coching
- Produced by: William Leary
- Starring: Janno Gibbs
- Cinematography: Ben Lobo
- Edited by: Edgardo Jarlego
- Music by: Ricky del Rosario
- Production company: Viva Family Entertainment
- Distributed by: Viva Films
- Release date: December 25, 1994
- Running time: 111 minutes
- Country: Philippines
- Language: Filipino

Ang Pagbabalik ni Pedro Penduko (English: The Return of Pedro Penduko) is a 1994 Philippine fantasy comedy film directed by J. Erastheo Navoa. Based on a Philippine comic character created by Francisco V. Coching, the film stars Janno Gibbs as the titular character. It was one of the entries in the 1994 Metro Manila Film Festival.

A sequel Pedro Penduko 2: The Return of the Comeback was released in 2000.

The film is streaming online on YouTube.

== Plot ==
Pedro Penduko steals a legendary talisman called the Cuatro Vidas from a collector named Abraham. When Abraham tries to get it back, the Cuatro Vidas activates a portal that sucks Pedro, his friend Ricky and Abraham to another dimension, where they are captured by militiamen led by Kidlat and his aide, Silahis. Silahis takes a fancy to the gay Ricky and after coming out also as gay, convinces the entire militia to return to their colonial-era town dressed in drag. Pedro, with his modern clothes and equipment, causes a stir in town, especially when Kidlat's niece Anna, to whom he becomes infatuated with, connects his arrival with that of a prophesied savior that will defeat Losipero, the demon leader of a group of monsters that has been harassing the town and abducting residents.

After Anna is abducted by monsters, Pedro sets out to attack Losipero's lair, followed by the townspeople as he battles multiple monsters along the way. Pedro arrives at Losipero's lair just as the latter arises from his slumber. After Pedro frees Anna, Losipero taunts him in battle, disorienting Pedro and making him spew out a stronger and evil version of himself that he eventually defeats after a difficult battle. Abraham arrives and helps Pedro defeat the monsters by using a barbell that turns Abraham into Captain Barbell and giving Anna a white stone that turns her into Darna. Pedro chases Losipero with the help of Flavio until he corners the demon and places the Cuatro Vidas around his neck, killing him.

As Pedro, Abraham and Ricky, accompanied by a nagging Silahis, prepare to return to their world, Pedro's girlfriend, Bambi arrives and angrily drags back Pedro to their home dimension after seeing him with Anna. As Pedro patches things up by kissing Bambi, Losipero suddenly appears, only for police officers to arrest him, saying that he is actually a lunatic named Don Robert.

== Cast ==
- Janno Gibbs as Pedro Penduko
- Donita Rose as Bambi
- Arnel Ignacio as Ricky
- Chiquito as Abraham
- Vina Morales as Anna
- Jun Aristorenas as Kidlat
- Rez Cortez as Silahis
- Malou de Guzman as Rosario
- Lester Llansang as Juan
- Danita Paner as Marla
- Ace Espinosa as Cultist
- Cris Daluz as Apo Lakay
- Danny Punzalan as Hunter
- Romy Diaz as Paniki
- Bing Loyzaga as Lucifera
- Leo Martinez as Lucifero
- Beverly Salviejo as Tourist
- Ross Rival as Tourist
- Boy Roque as Centurion
- Bing Angeles as Taong Apoy - Reality
- Robert Miller as Zombie Leader
- Cloyd Robinson as High Priest
- Boots Basi as Dancer
- Jun Madraga as Taong Apoy
- Benny Ching as Taong Apoy
- Jun Veneracion as Priset
- Tito Hilario as Taong Paniki

Guest cast

- Anjanette Abayari as Darna
- Sharon Cuneta as Pawnshop Manager
- Andrew E. as Captain Barbell
- Rudy Fernandez as Bobby Ortega
- Robin Padilla as Binoy
- Fernando Poe Jr. as Flavio

== Awards ==
Year	Awards	Category	Recipient	Result	Ref.
1994	20th Metro Manila Film Festival	Best Production Design	Ben Payumo	Won	
1994	20th Metro Manila Film Festival	Best Cinematography	Ben Lobo	Won	
1994	20th Metro Manila Film Festival	Best Visual Effects	Cinemagic	Won	
1994	20th Metro Manila Film Festival	Best Make-up	Rey Salamat	Won	
1994	20th Metro Manila Film Festival	Best Float	Ang Pagbabalik ni Pedro Penduko	Won	
