= My Kuya's Wedding =

2007 Filipino romantic comedy film

- Official movie poster
- Directed by: Topel Lee
- Screenplay by: Allan Tijamo
- Story by: Allan Tijamo; Lily Y. Monteverde
- Produced by: Lily Y. Monteverde
- Starring: Ryan Agoncillo; Maja Salvador; Pauleen Luna; Jason Abalos
- Cinematography: Louie Quirino
- Edited by: Marya Ignacio
- Music by: Von de Guzman
- Production company: Regal Films
- Distributed by: Regal Entertainment
- Release date: August 29, 2007 (Philippines)
- Running time: 112 minutes
- Country: Philippines
- Language: Filipino

My Kuya's Wedding is a 2007 Philippine romantic comedy film directed by Topel Lee and starring Maja Salvador, Pauleen Luna and Ryan Agoncillo.

== Plot ==
Kat (Maja Salvador) is deeply attached to her brother Jeff (Ryan Agoncillo), who has worked abroad to support her education. As Jeff prepares to marry Heidi (Pauleen Luna), Kat becomes increasingly anxious about the upcoming changes in their relationship.

When Jeff returns to the Philippines, Kat attends the traditional pamamanhikan—the formal visiting of the groom’s family by the bride’s relatives—in the province, intent on disrupting the ceremony and uncovering unsavoury details about Heidi’s family.

As Kat executes a series of comic schemes—including planting seeds of doubt and causing deliberate awkward moments—she enlists the help of her flamboyant best friend Vi (IC Mendoza)

However, things take an unexpected turn when she begins developing feelings for Aris (Jason Abalos), Heidi’s brother and a former reality show contestant, complicating her original plans

With Jeff’s marriage looming, Kat faces a dilemma: avenge her perceived betrayal or accept that love—both familial and romantic—can evolve. In a heartfelt realisation, she learns to let go and embrace the idea of a broader family.

== Cast ==
- Ryan Agoncillo as Kuya Jeff
- Maja Salvador as Kat
- Pauleen Luna as Heidi
- Jason Abalos as Aris
- Say Alonzo as Yvette
- Dick Israel as Peng
- Ethel Booba as Susie
- Janus del Prado as Colin
- Dominic Ochoa as Divo
- IC Mendoza as Vi
- Kitkat as Jopay
- Paul Salas as Young Jeff
- Frank Garcia as Rudy
- Ryan Yllana as Farrel
- Debraliz as Tere
- Raquel Villavicencio as Elsa
- Cheena Crab as Pepay
- Cheska Billiones as Young Kitkat
- Mika Dela Cruz as Young Yvette
- Jorel Tan as TV Reporter
