= Kanto Boy 2: Anak ni Totoy Guapo =

Philippine action film

- Directed by: Augusto Salvador
- Screenplay by: Humilde "Meek" Roxas
- Story by: Humilde "Meek" Roxas
- Produced by: Victor Villegas
- Starring: Ian Veneracion
- Cinematography: Rey Lapid
- Edited by: Joyce Bernal; Danny Gloria
- Music by: Jaime Fabregas
- Production company: Moviestars Production
- Distributed by: Moviestars Production
- Release date: December 25, 1994
- Running time: 96 minutes
- Country: Philippines
- Languages: Filipino; English

Kanto Boy 2: Anak ni Totoy Guapo (Note: The standard spelling is "guwapo", but the film spells it as "guapo".) (lit. 'Corner Boy 2: Son of Handsome Totoy') is a 1994 Philippine action film directed by Augusto Salvador. The film stars Ian Veneracion in the title role. It was one of the entries in the 1994 Metro Manila Film Festival.

== Plot ==
The movie centers on Guiller, a poor young man who falls in love with Michelle, a daughter of a rich businessman. He always gets involved in various conflicts while trying to protect the people he loves. His life changes when he discovers that he is a son of a well-celebrated criminal Totoy Guwapo.

== Cast ==
- Ian Veneracion as Guiller
- Kimberly Diaz as Michelle
- Ramon Christopher as Albert
- Dick Israel as Benjie
- Bunny Paras as Bernadette
- Bob Soler as Totoy Guwapo
- Max Laurel as Igay
- Dencio Padilla as Maning
- Jaime Fabregas as Don Anselmo
- Debraliz as Marvi
- Eric Francisco as Arman
- Dindo Arroyo as Albert's Aide
- Mike Magat as Albert's Aide
- Devin Villarama as Albert's Aide

== Awards ==
Year	Awards	Category	Recipient	Result	Ref.
1994	20th Metro Manila Film Festival	Best Actress	Kimberly Diaz	Won	
1994	20th Metro Manila Film Festival	Best Supporting Actor	Dick Israel	Won	
1994	20th Metro Manila Film Festival	Best Musical Score	Jaime Fabregas	Won	
1995	43rd FAMAS Awards	Supporting Actor	Dick Israel	Won	
