= Hati Tayo sa Magdamag =

1988 Filipino romantic drama film

- Directed by: Lupita A. Kashiwahara
- Screenplay by: Armando Lao
- Based on: Hati Tayo sa Magdamag by Sally Esteban
- Produced by: Ramon Salvador
- Starring: Edu Manzano; Tetchie Agbayani; Jacklyn Jose; Francis Magalona; Armida Siguion Reyna; Caridad Sanchez; Eddie Rodriguez
- Cinematography: Ato Bernardo
- Edited by: Ike Jarlego Jr.
- Music by: Mon del Rosario
- Production company: Viva Films
- Release date: March 9, 1988
- Country: Philippines
- Language: Filipino

Hati Tayo sa Magdamag (lit. 'We Share the Evening') is a 1988 Filipino romantic drama film directed by Lupita A. Kashiwahara and written by Armando Lao. Adapted from the Extra Special Komiks "komik" of the same name by Sally Esteban, it stars Edu Manzano, Tetchie Agbayani, Jacklyn Jose, Francis Magalona, Armida Siguion Reyna, Caridad Sanchez and Eddie Rodriguez. Produced by Viva Films, the film was released on March 9, 1988.

Critic Lav Diaz gave Hati Tayo sa Magdamag a mixed review, stating that the film is "not too good and not quite a failure" while giving praise to Jose's performance.

== Cast ==
- Edu Manzano as Jerry "Greggy" Pangilinan
- Tetchie Agbayani as Antonette Revilla
- Jacklyn Jose as Rochelle San Juan
- Francis Magalona as Arthur
- Armida Siguion Reyna as Doña Concha Revilla
- Caridad Sanches as Aling Pinang
- Eddie Rodriguez as Don Teofilo Revilla
- Janice Jurado as Don Teofilo's girlfriend
- Tina Loy as Nana Viring
- Junix Inocian as Mr. Diwa
- Jun Roy as Mang Selo
- Tito Tesoro as Mang Tito
- Freddie Papa as Mang Johnny
- Marie Barbacui as Inday
- Butch Gonzales as professor
- Dr. Joseph Laureta as doctor
- Anna Ascalon as nurse
- Alma Lerma as Doña Concha's friend
- Bessie Barredo as Doña Concha's friend
- Remy Novales as Doña Concha's friend

== Production ==
Hati Tayo sa Magdamag is director Lupita A. Kashiwahara's first theatrical film in many years, and is based on the Extra Special Komiks "komik" of the same by Sally Esteban.

== Release ==
Hati Tayo sa Magdamag was rated "A" by the Movie and Television Review and Classification Board (MTRCB), indicating a "Very Good" quality, and was released on March 9 or 10, 1988.

=== Critical response ===
Lav Diaz, writing for the Manila Standard, gave Hati Tayo sa Magdamag a mixed review, stating that the film is "not too good and not quite a failure. It has intense scenes and it also has some that can be open to interpretation." He also praised Jaclyn Jose's performance and the screenplay's lack of overly poetic dialogue, the latter of which he noted is a common trait among films produced by Viva Films, but he lamented the fact that a slapping scene still remained in the film, stating that "only one slap was done but this was a deafening crack on the film." He concluded on a positive note that the film is a step in the right direction for the studio to change its traditions.

== TV Rights acquisition ==
ABS-CBN acquired the television rights to air the movie in 1990. It was retitled Hati Tayo sa Puso when it premiered on the network's weekend movie block Tagalog Movie Greats.
