= Dick Israel =

Filipino actor (1947–2016)

- Born: Ricardo Vizcarra Michaca; December 10, 1947; Porac, Pampanga, Philippines
- Died: October 11, 2016 (aged 68); Caloocan, Metro Manila, Philippines
- Resting place: Eternal Gardens Memorial Park
- Occupation: Actor
- Years active: 1970–2014
- Height: 170 cm (5 ft 7 in)
- Spouse: Marilyn Michaca
- Children: 8
- Parent: Eduardo de Castro (biological father)

Ricardo Vizcarra Michaca (December 10, 1947 – October 11, 2016), known by his stage name Dick Israel, was a Filipino character actor who played mostly villain and sidekick roles in many Filipino movies. He later branched out in television.

== Death ==
On October 11, 2016, Israel suffered blood vomiting and bleeding from his rectum, and later died in his home, according to actress Vivian Velez, a member of the Damay Kamay Foundation. He was 68. His wife, Marilyn Michaca, died four days later due to unrelated circumstances. Before his death, Israel was seeking help after his residence in Bagong Barrio, Caloocan was damaged in a fire in July of the same year.

== Filmography ==
=== Film ===
Year	Title	Role
1970	I Love You Honey	
1970	Casa Fuego (Maapoy Na Pagnanasa)	
1971	Bar Girl	
1974	Kamay Na Gumagapang	
1980	Kalibre .45	
1982	T-Bird at Ako	Dickie
1983	Intrusion: Cambodia	
1984	Soltero	Teddy
1985	Ben Tumbling: A People's Journal Story	Max
1985	Sangley Point Robbery	Bungo
1985	Blood Debts	Rapist
1986	Boy Paltik: Triggerman	Oying
1987	Anak ng Lupa	Eric
1987	Target: Sparrow Unit	
1988	Parrot Unit	
1988	Akyat Bahay Gang	Ato
1988	Urban Terrorist	
1988	Tumayo Ka't... Lumaban	
1988	Ambush	Ka Diego
1988	Kumander Bawang: Kalaban ng Mga Aswang	
1988	Dugo ng Pusakal	
1988	Patrolman	
1989	Arrest: Pat. Rizal Alih – Zamboanga Massacre	Nasim
1989	Hindi Pahuhuli ng Buhay	Romulo
1989	Babayaran Mo ng Dugo	Lito
1989	Handa Na ang Hukay Mo, Calida	Ka Datwin
1990	Sa Nag-aapoy Na Dagat	Toto Montelibano
1990	Kahit Singko, Hindi Ko Babayaran ang Buhay Mo	Martin
1990	David Balondo ng Tondo	Tir-Tir 1
1990	Walang Awa Kung Pumatay	Pandong
1990	Bad Boy	Bondat
1990	Kapitan Paile: Hindi Kita Iiwanang Buhay	Engr. Alcazar
1990	Iisa-isahin Ko Kayo!	Sanchez
1990	Anak ni Baby Ama	Kulas
1990	Kaaway ng Batas	Buyer of dope
1991	Ganti ng Api	Dick
1991	Lintik Na Lang ang Walang Ganti!	Javier
1991	Maging Sino Ka Man	Pando
1991	Boyong Mañalac: Hoodlum Terminator	Pipi
1991	Manong Gang: Ang Kilabot at Maganda	Jimmy Cordero
1991	Kumukulong Dugo	Astong
1992	Magnong Rehas	Boy Aswang
1992	Aswang	Patrick
1992	Boboy Salonga: Batang Tondo	Cpl. Tumang
1992	Cordora: Lulutang Ka sa Sarili Mong Dugo	
1992	Jerry Marasigan, WPD	
1992	Bad Boy 2	Ato
1992	Alyas Ninong: Huling Kilabot ng Tondo	Duwall
1992	Andres Manambit: Angkan ng Matatapang	Lt. Burgos
1993	Sana Ay Ikaw Na Nga	Chito
1993	Patapon	Arnel
1993	Pugoy – Hostage: Davao	
1993	Sgt. Lando Liwanag: Vengador (Batas ng Api)	Julio
1993	Galvez: Hanggang sa Dulo ng Mundo Hahanapin Kita	Daniel
1993	Humanda Ka Mayor!: Bahala Na ang Diyos	Mayor Miguel Beltran
1993	Doring Dorobo: Hagupit ng Batas	Bart Pasubali
1994	Bawal Na Gamot	Tom
1994	Markadong Hudas	Olivares
1994	Nagkataon, Nagkatagpo	Dickoy
1994	Epimaco Velasco: NBI	NBI Men
1994	Kanto Boy 2: Anak ni Totoy Guapo	Benjie
1994	Baby Paterno: Dugong Pulis	Jessie
1994	Pedrito Masangkay: Walang Bakas na Iniwan	Sarmiento
1995	Hanggang sa Huling Bala	Dado
1995	Judge Max Asuncion: Hukom Bitay	Mayor's Aide
1995	Matimbang Pa sa Dugo	Dodoy
1995	Ang Titser Kong Pogi	Morgan
1995	Dog Tag: Katarungan sa Aking Kamay	Hepe
1996	Maginoong Barumbado: Kung May Halaga Pa ang Buhay Mo	Monsod
1996	Diego	Arman Miraflor
1996	Leon Cordero: Duwag Lang ang Hahalik sa Lupa	Waray
1996	Batas Ko Ay Bala	Victor
1996	Wag na Wag Kang Lalayo	Pidyong
1996	Da Best in Da West 2: Da Western Pulis Istori	Don Boquia
1996	Aringkingking: Ang Bodyguard Kong Sexy	Mekeni
1996	Rubberman	Val Balbin / Mandreko
1997	Bubot, Kulang sa Panahon	Mang Gorio
1997	Buhay Mo, Buhay Ko Rin	Atty.
1998	Strebel: Gestapo ng Maynila	Carding
1998	Sugat sa Puri	Mayor Ricardo Roman
1998	Tulak ng Bibig, Kabig ng Dibdib	Donat
1998	Ginto't Pilak	Ding
1998	Alamid: Ang Alamat	Payaso
1999	Laging Sariwa ang Sugat	Mando
2000	Sagot Kita Mula Ulo Hanggang Paa	Bong
2001	Alas-Dose	PO4 Magno
2001	Carta Alas... Huwag Ka Nang Humirit	Melvin
2001	Mano Mano 2: Ubusan ng Lakas	Morales
2002	Batas ng Lansangan	Dodong
2002	Hari ng Selda: Anak ni Baby Ama 2	Billy Casiping
2002	Kilabot at Kembot	Hector
2002	Super B	Tatay Billy
2002	Gising Na si Adan	PSupt. Lance Crisologo
2003	Bold Star	Gusting
2003	Pakners	Elias
2004	Enteng Kabisote: OK Ka Fairy Ko... The Legend	Head
2005	Ispiritista: Itay, May Moomoo!	Brother Jojo
2006	Lagot Ka sa Kuya Ko!	State witness
2006	Apoy sa Dibdib ng Samar	Don Valderos
2006	The Hunt for Eagle One: Crash Point	Rasheed
2006	Batas Militar	Col. Ortega
2007	You Got Me!	Glenn Ricafort
2007	My Kuya's Wedding	Peng
2007	Apat Dapat, Dapat Apat: Friends 4 Lyf and Death	Kapt. Kadyo Macapagal
2008	My Big Love	Chef Sen
2009	Grandpa Is Dead	Isidro Hernandez
2009	And I Love You So	Jun Panlilio
2010	Dalaw	Priest
2011	Pak! Pak! My Dr. Kwak!	Healed by Angelito
2013	Badil	
2013	Boy Golden: Shoot to Kill	Boy Bungal
2014	Ang Bagong Dugo	(His Last Film Appearance)

==== 1970s ====
- Bobby Jerrylito Cañada Boy Habal ni Tonet (1975)
- Mga Uhaw na Bulaklak (1975)
- Ligaya Mo'y Inagaw Mo (1976)
- Makamandag si Adora (1976)
- Escolta: Mayo 13, Biyernes ng Hapon (1976)
- Ikaw... Ako, Laban sa Mundo (1976)
- Walang Bakas na Naiiwan (1977)
- Bloody Hero (1977)
- Lalaki, Babae Kami (1977)
- Gameng (1977)
- Hindi Sa iyo ang Mundo, Baby Porcuna (1978)
- Boy Pena (1978)
- Joe Quintero (1978)
- Doble Kara (1978)
- Holdup (Special Squad:D.B) (1979)
- Tom Cat (1979)
- Boy Putik (1979)
- Pepeng Kulisap (1979)
- Aliw (1979)

==== 1980s ====
- Palawan (1980)
- Biktima (1980)
- Misson... Terrorize Panay (1980)
- Magno Barumbado (1980)
- Kalibre 45. (1980)
- Sa Init ng Apoy (1980)
- Cover Girl (1981)
- Boy Nazareno (1981)
- Laya (1981)
- Pepeng Shotgun (1981)
- Dugong Mandirigma (1981)
- Hot Nights (1981)
- Kambal sa Baril (1981)
- T-Bird at Ako (1982)
- Isaac... Dugo ni Abraham (1982)
- Brother Ben (1982)
- Maguindanao (1982)
- Pedring Taruc (1982)
- Estong Tutong: Ikalawang Yugto (1983)
- Inside Job (1983)
- Digmaan Sa Pagitan ng Langit at Lupa (1983)
- Intrusion: Cambodia (1983)
- To Love Again (1983)
- Sumuko Ka Na, Ronquillo (1983)
- JR (1983)
- Kriminal (1984)
- Sekreta Ini (1984)
- Idol (1985)
- Bilang na ang Oras mo (1985)
- Blood Debts (1985)
- Revenge for Justice (1985)
- The Sangley Point Robbery (1985)
- Calapan Jailbreak (1985)
- Isusumpa Mo Ang Araw Nang Isilang Ka (1985)
- Kapirasong Dangal (1986)
- Alindog (1986)
- Araaayyyyy!!! (1986)
- Materyales Fuertes (1986)
- Flesh Avenue (1986)
- Desperada (1986)
- Dongalo Massacre (1986)
- No Return No Exchange (1986)
- Salamangkero (The Magician) (1986)
- Humanda Ka, Ikaw ang Susunod (1986)
- Hudas (1987)
- Lala (1987)
- G.I. Baby (1987)
- Sgt. Victor Magno: Kumakasa Kahit Nag-iisa (1988)
- Mula Paa Hanggang Ulo (1989) ... Dikya
- Salisi Gang (1989)
- Ang Lihim ng Golden Buddha (1989)
- Bir Mammud: Alyas Boy Muslim (1989)
- Killer vs. Ninjas (1989)
- Bala... Dapat kay Cris Cuenca, Public Enemy No. 1 (1989)
- Sgt. Melgar (1989)
- Hindi Pahuhuli ng Buhay (1989)
- Durugin ng Bala si Peter Torres (1989)
- Black Sheep Baby (1989)
- Handa Na ang Hukay Mo, Calida (1989)
- Galit sa Mundo (1989)
- Boy Kristiano (1989)
- Sa Diyos Lang Ako Susuko (1989)
- Nazareno Apostol: Boy Ahas (1989)

==== 1990s ====
- Asiong Salonga: Hari ng Tondo (1990)
- Hepe: ...Isasabay kita sa Paglubog ng Araw (1990)
- Sgt Patalinhug: CIS Special Operations Group (1990)
- Ibabaon Kita sa Lupa (1990)
- Biokids (1990)
- Hulihin si... Boy Amores (1990)
- Kristobal: Tinik sa Korona (1990)
- Hukom .45 (1990)
- Kahit Singko, Di Ko Babayaran ang Buhay Mo (1990)
- Ayaw Matulog ng Gabi (1990)
- Walang Piring ang Katarungan (1990)
- Hanggang Saan ang Tapang Mo (1990)
- Tapos Na ang Lahi Mo, Hadji Djakiri (1990)
- Anak ni Baby Ama (1990)
- Dino Dinero (1990)
- Iputok mo Idadapa Ako! (Hard to Die) (1991) (Release Date: January 16, 1991)
- Lintik Lang ng Walang Ganti! (1991) ... Javier (Release Date: January 30, 1991)
- Maging Sino Ka Man (1991)
- Para sa Iyo ang Huling Bala Ko (1991) ... Danilo (Release Date: March 30, 1991)
- Kung Patatawarin ka ng Bala Ko! (1991) (Release Date: June 19, 1991)
- Markang Bungo: The Bobby Ortega Story (1991) (Release Date: July 24, 1991)
- Ganti ng Api (1991) ... *** (Release Date: September 25, 1991)
- Alyas Pogi 2 (1991) ... Shabu Distributor (Release Date: October 23, 1991)
- Magdaleno Orbos: Sa Kuko ng mga Lawin (1991) (Release Date: November 6, 1991)
- Kumukulong Dugo (1991) (Release Date: November 27, 1991)
- Alyas Ninong: Huling Kilabot ng Tondo (1992) (Release Date: January 29, 1992)
- Magnong Rehas (1992) ... Boy Negro (Release Date: April 8, 1992)
- Eddie Tagalog: Pulis Makati (1992) (Release Date: March 21, 1992)
- Manong Gang: Ang Kilabot ang Maganda (1992) (Release Date: July 22, 1992)
- Big Boy Bato: Kilabot no Kankaloo (1992) (Release Date: August 5, 1992)
- Bad Boy II (1992) (Release Date: August 26, 1992)
- Lacson, Batas ng Navotas (1992) (Release Date: October 28, 1992)
- Aswang (1992)
- Andres Manambit: Angkan sa Matatapang (1992) (Release Date: December 25, 1992) (Official to 1992 MMFF)
- Humanda Ka Mayor!: Bahala Na ang Diyos (1993)
- Abel Morado: Ikaw ang May Sala (1993)
- Enteng Manok: Tari ng Quiapo (1993)
- Patapon (1993)
- Kung Kailangan Mo Ako (1993)
- Pita: Terror ng Caloocan (1993)
- Galvez: Hanggang sa Dulo ng Mundo Hahanapin Kita (1993) (Release Date: May 26, 1993)
- The Vizconde Massacre Story (God Help Us!) (1993)
- Hindi Pa Tapos ang Laban (1994)
- Pusoy Dos (1994)
- Baby Paterno (Dugong Pulis) (1994)
- Tony Bagyo: Daig Pa ang Asong Ulol (1994)
- Pedrito Masangkay: Walang Bakas na Iniwan (1994)
- Epimaco Velasco: NBI (1994)
- Nagkataon ... Nagkatagpo (1994) (Release Date: May 25, 1994)
- Bawal Na Gamot (1994)
- Lagalag: The Eddie Fernandez Story (1994) (Release Date: September 28, 1994)
- Kanto Boy 2: Ang Anak ni Totoy Guapo (1994) (Release Date: December 25, 1994, of MMFF)
- Dog Tag: Katarungan sa Aking Kamay (1995)
- Alfredo Lim: Batas ng Maynila (1995)
- Matimbang Pa sa Dugo (1995)
- Melencio Magat: Dugo Laban sa Dugo (1995)
- Ang Titser Kong Pogi (1995) (Release Date: October 11, 1995)
- Ang Pinakamagandang Hayop sa Balat ng Lupa (1996)
- Maginoong Barumbado (1996) (Release Date: February 29, 1996)
- Da Best in da West 2: Da Western Pulis Istori (1996)
- Aringkingking (1996)
- Rubberman (1996)
- Angela: Sabik sa Pagmamahal (1997)
- Babangon Ang Huling Patak ng Dugo (1997)
- Hapdi ng Tag-init (1997)
- Tapang sa Tapang (1997)
- Iskalawag: Ang Batas Ay Batas (1997)
- Lihim ni Madonna (1997)
- Strebel: Gestapo ng Maynila (1997)
- Pakawalang Puso (1998)
- Curacha: Ang Babaeng Walang Pahinga (1998)
- Squala (1998)
- Tulak ng Bibig, Kabig ng Dibdib (1998)
- Ginto't Pilak (1998)
- Ang Erpat Kong Astig (1998)
- Wansapanataym (1999)
- Noriega: God's Favorite (1999)

==== 2000s ====
- Laro sa Baga (2000)
- Narinig Mo Na Ba ang L8est? (2001)
- Basagan ng Mukha (2001)
- Sanggano't Sanggago (2001)
- Cass & Cary: Who Wants to Be a Billionaire? (2002)
- Fantastic Man (2003)
- Mano Mano 3: Arnis the Lost Art (2004)
- Makamundo (2004)
- Happily Ever After (2005)
- Oh My Ghost! (2006)
- You Got Me! (2007) - Glenn Ricafort
- My Kuya's Wedding (2007) - Peng
- Four in One (2007)
- Katas ng Saudi (2007)
- My Big Love (2008) - Chef Sen
- Padre de Pamilya (2009)
- Grandpa Is Dead (2009) - Isidro
- And I Love You So (2009) - Jun Panlilio

==== 2010s ====
- Dalaw (2010)
- Pak! Pak! My Dr. Kwak! (2011)
- Enteng ng Ina Mo (2011)

=== Television ===
Year	Title	Role	Notes
1999	Beh Bote Nga	Mang Max	
2001	Wansapanataym: Flying Voters	Mayor Jaime Hibang	Episode: Flying Voters
2001	Sa Puso Ko Iingatan Ka	Tats	
2003	Buttercup	Dante	
2003	It Might Be You	Bruno	
2006	Bahay Mo Ba 'To?	Mang Turing	
2006	Your Song Presents: Kung Paano	Manuel	
2006	Maging Sino Ka Man	Diosdado "Dadoods" Davide	
2007	Margarita	Robert Trinidad	
2007	Mga Kuwento ni Lola Basyang: Ang Walong Bulag	Kapitan Chimo	
2007	Maalaala Mo Kaya: Maong	Lauro	Episode: Maong
2007	Lupin	Warden Jouquin Bagbag	
2007	Carlo J. Caparas' Kamandag	Rogelio	
2008	Maalaala Mo Kaya: Journal	Milyong	
2008	Kahit Isang Saglit	Commander Matteo Padilla	
2008	Eva Fonda	Tita Clem	
2009	Zorro	Jumal	
2009	Only You	Rodolfo "Rod" Sembrano/Elvis	
2010	Magkano ang Iyong Dangal?	George	
2010	Agimat: Ang Mga Alamat ni Ramon Revilla: Tonyong Bayawak	Inspector Rodrigo	
2012	Toda Max	Bar customer	Special Guest
2012	Kung Ako'y Iiwan Mo	Arturo 'Atoy' Pedroso	Last Television show

== Awards ==
Year	Award-Giving Body	Category	Work	Result
1988	Metro Manila Film Festival	Best Supporting Actor	Patrolman	Won
1994	Metro Manila Film Festival	Best Supporting Actor	Kanto Boy 2: Anak ni Totoy Guapo	Won
