= Galvez: Hanggang sa Dulo ng Mundo Hahanapin Kita =

- Directed by: Manuel "Fyke" Cinco
- Screenplay by: Henry Nadong; Lavindico Diaz
- Produced by: Jesse M. Ejercito
- Starring: Eddie Garcia; Edu Manzano
- Cinematography: Edmund Cupcupin
- Edited by: Edmund "Bot" Jarlego
- Music by: Nonong Buencamino
- Production company: Regal Films
- Distributed by: Regal Films
- Release date: May 27, 1993
- Running time: 103 minutes
- Country: Philippines
- Language: Filipino

Galvez: Hanggang sa Dulo ng Mundo Hahanapin Kita (transl. Galvez: I Will Search for You Until the Edge of the World) is a 1993 Filipino action film directed by Manuel "Fyke" Cinco from a screenplay by Henry Nadong and Lav Diaz. It stars Eddie Garcia as the titular protagonist and Edu Manzano. Produced by Regal Films, the film was released on May 27, 1993.

The film is streaming online on YouTube.

== Plot ==
After being sentenced to twice the reclusion perpetua for raping and murdering a woman, Marvin (Edu) vows to take revenge on top lawyer Efren (Eddie).

== Cast ==
- Eddie Garcia as Efren Galvez
- Edu Manzano as Marvin Esguerra
- Cristina Gonzales as Carla
- Pilar Pilapil as Patricia
- Sunshine Cruz as Roselle
- Christopher Rojas as Junie
- Jaime Fabregas as Serante
- Berting Labra as David
- Dick Israel as Daniel
- Jess Ramos as Bert
- Marithez Samson
- Delia Razon
- Ernie Zarate
- Nanding Fernandez as Andoy
- Joseph Serra as Judge
