= Edu Manzano =

Filipino actor and politician (born 1955)

- Manzano in 2012

Vice Mayor of Makati
- In office June 30, 1998 – June 30, 2001
- Mayor: Elenita Binay
- Preceded by: Arturo Yabut
- Succeeded by: Ernesto Mercado

Chairman of the Optical Media Board
- In office February 10, 2004 – August 20, 2009
- President: Gloria Macapagal Arroyo
- Preceded by: Bong Revilla
- Succeeded by: Ronnie Ricketts

Personal details
- Born: Eduardo Luis Barrios Manzano; September 14, 1955 (age 71) San Francisco, California, U.S.
- Citizenship: Spain; United States; Philippines
- Party: PMP (2018–present)
- Other political affiliations: Lakas (2001–2015); Liberal (1997–2001); Independent (2015–2018)
- Spouses: Vilma Santos (m. 1980; div. 1982) Maricel Soriano (m. 1989; div. 1991)
- Domestic partner: Ann Cuisia
- Children: 4, including Luis and Diego
- Relatives: Jessy Mendiola (daughter-in-law); Tingting Cojuangco (cousin)
- Education: De La Salle University
- Occupation: Actor; television personality; comedian; politician

Military service
- Branch/service: United States Air Force
- Years of service: 1973–1977
- Commands: Missile Engineering Group, Strategic Air Command
- Battles/wars: Vietnam War

Eduardo Luis "Edu" Barrios Manzano (Tagalog: [ˈʔɛdu manˈsanɔ]; born September 14, 1955) is a Filipino actor, television presenter, and politician. He hosted the game shows The Weakest Link, Pilipinas, Game KNB?, 1 vs. 100, Asar Talo Lahat Panalo!, and Game 'N Go.

== Early life ==
Eduardo Luis Barrios Manzano was born on September 14, 1955, in San Francisco, California, United States to Hispanofilipino parents hails from Visayas.

Manzano studied at St. Paul University Manila and at De La Salle University in Manila. He also played for De La Salle Green Archers' Judo and basketball teams. He was coached by Joaqui Trillo while La Salle still at the NCAA.

== Acting career ==
Manzano moved to the Philippines to pursue a full-time career with the local film industry. He was president of the actors’ group Katipunan ng mga Artista ng Pelikulang Pilipino in the 1990s.

He was part of ABS-CBN's roster of contract actors until he took leave to run for Vice President of the Philippines in the 2010 general elections. After losing in the elections, he elected to transition from show business to current affairs programs, and soon after, signed a contract and returned to GMA Network.

In 2010, he hosted the pre-noontime game show Asar Talo Lahat Panalo!.

In 2011, he hosted Family Feud: The Showdown Edition. Manzano later defected to TV5 for a new TV show called Game 'N Go. In 2012, he joined the morning show called Good Morning Club.

In June 2017, Manzano returned to GMA Network to appear in Celebrity Bluff as a Master Bluffer.

In 2018, he returned to ABS-CBN for a role in FPJ's Ang Probinsyano.

== Sporting career ==
Aside from acting and political career, Manzano was once appointed as the executive vice-president of the Philippine Amateur Judo Association, and as an executive board member of the Philippine Olympic Committee.

== Political career ==
Manzano entered politics in 1998 when he ran for Vice Mayor of Makati as a Liberal. He garnered a majority of votes in the election, but his proclamation was suspended due to a case filed which alleged that he was not a Filipino citizen because he was born in the United States. The Supreme Court (Mercado v. Manzano) eventually ruled that he was indeed a Filipino citizen, clearing the way for his proclamation as Vice-Mayor. Following a three-year term, he lost his bid for campaign for Mayor of Makati in 2001 to Jejomar Binay.

In February 2004, Manzano became the first chairman of the Optical Media Board (OMB), a government agency tasked with combating optical media piracy. He resigned from the position in August 2009.

Manzano ran as the Lakas–Kampi's candidate for Vice-president in the May 2010 election as the running mate of presidential candidate Gilbert Teodoro. He lost again to Makati Mayor Jejomar Binay, placing fifth.

In 2016, Manzano ran for a seat in the Senate, as part of the Partido Galing at Puso coalition of presidential candidate Senator Grace Poe. He lost, finishing 21st overall.

In 2019, Manzano ran for Representative of San Juan under the Pwersa ng Masang Pilipino. However, he was disqualified by the COMELEC due to concerns regarding his citizenship.

In 2022, Manzano supported Leni Robredo's campaign and some of its senatorial slate members, but blasted his former rival Jejomar Binay, who was also a member of the slate, and supported his friend and former running-mate Gilbert Teodoro's senatorial campaign.

== Personal life ==
In 1980, Manzano married actress Vilma Santos. The marriage lasted until 1982 and produced one son, Luis Manzano, who followed his parents into the entertainment industry as a television host and actor. In 1989, he married actress Maricel Soriano; however, the marriage was annulled in 1991.

Manzano was in a long-term relationship with former model Rina Samson, with whom he has two children: a daughter, Addie, and a son, Enzo. He later had a high-profile relationship with television news anchor Pinky Webb, which ended in 2009 prior to his vice-presidential campaign. Between 2021 and 2023, he was romantically linked to actress Cherry Pie Picache.

In March 2026, Manzano confirmed he is in a relationship with Ann Cuisia, a tech entrepreneur and the founder of a blockchain technology firm.

Outside of his older children, Manzano has a son, Diego Aspiras (born 2004), from a previous relationship with celebrity chef Reggie Aspiras. Diego is a professional footballer who played for the Spanish club Barcelona City FC.

== Filmography ==
=== Film ===
Year	Title	Role
1980	Alaga	
1980	Romansa	
1981	Mahinhin vs. Mahinhin	Archie
1981	Dear Heart	The Professors
1982	Schoolgirls	Nestor
1984	Working Girls	Danny Prado
1985	Kapag Puso'y Sinugatan	Junie
1985	Kailan Tama ang Mali	Ruben
1985	Hindi Nahahati ang Langit	Ronald
1985	Pati Ba Pintig ng Puso?	Dr. Francis Palma
1985	Till We Meet Again	Paquito
1985	Sangley Point Robbery	Bobby
1985	Ano ang Kulay ng Mukha ng Diyos?	Rudy
1986	Paano Hahatiin ang Puso	
1986	Palimos ng Pag-ibig	Rodel
1986	Nakagapos Na Puso	Rolly Enriquez
1986	Captain Barbell	Teng-Teng / Captain Barbell
1986	Bilanggo sa Dilim	Marissa's Date
1987	Alabok sa Ulap	Vince
1987	Jack & Jill	Angelo Bartolome
1987	Working Girls 2	
1988	Huwag Mong Itanong Kung Bakit	Lar Cuevas
1988	Misis Mo, Misis Ko	
1988	Hati Tayo sa Magdamag	Jerry Pangilinan
1988	Babaing Hampaslupa	Vincent
1989	Eagle Squad	Edmund Morales
1989	Isang Araw Walang Diyos	Jay Molina
1990	Hanggang Kailan Ka Papatay?	Joel Suarigi
1990	Kaaway ng Batas	Ryan
1991	Alyas Pogi: Birador ng Nueva Ecija	Agapito Rodrigo
1991	Onyong Majikero	Abdul Akbar
1991	Maging Sino Ka Man	Gilbert
1991	Kidlat ng Maynila: Joe Pring 2	Karim
1991	Hindi Palulupig	Basil
1991	Capt. Jaylo (Batas sa Batas)	
1991	Sagad Hanggang Buto	Zapanta
1991	Boyong Mañalac: Hoodlum Terminator	Mendez
1991	Noel Juico, 16: Batang Kriminal	Lt. Perez
1991	Pretty Boy Hoodlum	Bobby Imperial
1991	Kumukulong Dugo	Marco
1991	Kapitan Jaylo Batas sa Batas Walang Sinasanto	Lt. Orly Mendoza
1991	Kung Patatawarin Ka ng Bala Ko!	Dante
1991	Darna	Dominico Lipolico
1991	Contreras Gang	Mario Contreras
1992	Kailangan Kita	Luis
1992	Pangako Sa'yo	Raymond
1992	Alyas Boy Kano	Boy Kano
1992	Mahal Kita, Walang Iba	Robbie
1992	Shake, Rattle & Roll IV	Arturo "Bodjie" Zerrudo
1993	Dugo ng Panday	Conde
1993	Magkasangga sa Batas	Albert Moran (Jess Babida)
1993	Galvez: Hanggang sa Dulo ng Mundo Hahanapin Kita	Marvin Esguerra
1993	Lt. Madarang: Iginuhit sa Dugo	Lt. Lito Madarang
1993	Kung Ako'y Iiwan Mo	
1993	Task Force Habagat	Col. Panfilo "Ping" Lacson
1993	Di Na Natuto (Sorry Na, Puede Ba?)	Bongbong
1994	Geron Olivar	Frankie Montero
1994	Ang Ika-Labing Isang Utos: Mahalin Mo, Asawa Mo	Tony
1994	Mars Ravelo's Darna! Ang Pagbabalik	Max
1994	Ah Sau Ging Gat: Si Gou Aat Sin	Edu
1994	Separada	Dodie
1994	Ismael Zacarias	Ismael Zacarias
1994	Wanted: Perfect Father	Mr. Manyakis
1994	Hong Tian Mi Ling	Lt. Eddie Sapian
1995	Costales	Capt. Daniel Costales
1995	Batas Ko ang Katapat Mo	Mike
1995	Baby Love	Benny Palanca
1996	Romano Sagrado: Talim sa Dilim	Col. Zaragosa
1996	Tubusin Mo ng Bala ang Puso Ko	Atty. Lorenzo
1996	Sa Kamay ng Batas	Calderon
1996	Ama, Ina, Anak	Santi Alvarez
1996	Kung Marunong Kang Magdasal, Umpisahan Mo Na	Brando
1997	Totoy Hitman	Allan Morales
1997	I Do? I Die! (D'yos Ko Day!)	Bernardo "Bernie" Mendiola
1997	Mortal Kong Kaaway Kaibigang Tunay	
1997	Simaron, Barya Lang ang Halaga Ng Ulo Mo!	
1997	Minsan Lamang Magmamahal	Manuel
1997	Hanggang Dito Na Lang	
1997	Batang PX	Danny
1997	Bagsik ng Kamao	Ibanez
1998	Anting-Anting	
1998	Jesus Salonga, Alyas Boy Indian	
1998	Puso ng Pasko	Miguel Carpio
1999	Ang Kabit ni Mrs. Montero	Cal Montero
1999	Markado	Tisoy
2000	Emilio Aguinaldo	
2000	Minsan, Minahal Kita	Louie
2000	Minsan Ko Lang Sasabihin	Joker
2000	Abandonada	Edwin
2000	Tanging Yaman	Arturo "Art"
2001	Tatarin	Ernesto
2003	Ang Tanging Ina	Tony
2015	Halik sa Hangin	John
2019	Just a Stranger	
2019	3pol Trobol: Huli Ka Balbon!	Senator Simon Esguerra
2022	Mamasapano: Now It Can Be Told	Gen. Benjamin Magalong
2025	Everyone Knows Every Juan	Tupe Sevilla

=== Television ===
Year	Title	Role	Note(s)
1986–88	Not So Late Night with Edu	Himself (host)	
1987–98	Palibhasa Lalake	Budoy	
1995–96	Emergency	Himself (host)	
1999	Di Ba't Ikaw	Guiller	
1999–2000	Labs Ko Si Babe	Alvin Reanzales / Eriberto Agustin	
2001–02	The Weakest Link	Himself (Quizmaster)	
2001–03	Sa Puso Ko Iingatan Ka	Armand Montecillo	
2002–03	Kay Tagal Kang Hinintay	Henri Argos	
2003; 2011	Unang Hirit	Himself (host)	
2003–06	OK Fine, 'To Ang Gusto Nyo!	Junior	
2004–05	MTB: Ang Saya Saya	Himself (host)	
2007	Walang Kapalit	Ariston Borromeo	
2007–09	Pilipinas, Game KNB?	Himself (host)	
2007–09	Umagang Kay Ganda	Himself (host)	
2010	Asar Talo Lahat Panalo!	Himself (host)	
2011	Family Feud: The Showdown Edition	Himself (host)	
2012–13	Game 'N Go	Himself (host)	
2013	What's Up Doods?	Himself (host)	
2014	Face the People	Himself (host)	
2015	Bridges of Love	Lorenzo Antonio	
2016–17	Someone to Watch Over Me	Gregor "Buddy" Chavez	
2017	My Dear Heart	Luke Divinagracia	
2017	Alyas Robin Hood	Emilio Albano	
2017–18	Celebrity Bluff	Himself (Master Bluffer)	
2018–19	FPJ's Ang Probinsyano	Vice President/ President Lucas Cabrera	
2018	Barangay 143	Commissioner Jack	Voice role
2020	24/7	Claudio Jacinto	
2021–22	Marry Me, Marry You	Emilio Legaspi	
2022	Flower of Evil	Henry Del Rosario	
2022	A Family Affair	Don Frederico "Freddie" Estrella	
2024–25	Lavender Fields	Vittorio Buenavidez	
2025	EIC on the Move	Himself (guest host)	Two episodes
2025	Safe Ka Ba, 2025?	Himself (host)	Television special
2025–26	Call My Manager	Matthew Buenaventura	Shot from 2022 to 2023
2026	A Secret in Prague	Mario Pinagpala	
2026	Sigabo	Ricardo Jacinto	

== Discography ==
- Edu Manzano: Dancer of the Universe (Universal Records, 2008)
- World's Greatest Dance Steps (Universal Records, 2007)

== Awards and nominations ==
Year	Award giving body	Category	Nominated work	Result
1987	PMPC Star Awards for TV	Best Male TV Host	Not So Late Night With Edu	Won
2007	MYX Music Awards	Favorite Guest Appearance in a Music Video	"DVD" by Sandwich	Nominated
2009	1st MTRCB TV Awards	Best Male Host	Pilipinas, Game KNB?	Won
2020	Eastwood City Walk Of Fame	Celebrity Inductee	—N/a	Won
