= Maging Sino Ka Man (film) =

1991 Filipino film directed by Eddie Rodriguez

- Official movie poster
- Directed by: Eddie Rodriguez
- Written by: Emmanuel H. Borlaza; Eddie Rodriguez
- Produced by: Vic R. del Rosario Jr.; William C. Leary
- Starring: Sharon Cuneta; Robin Padilla
- Cinematography: Sergio Lobo
- Edited by: Ike Jarlego Jr.
- Music by: Jimmy Fabregas
- Production company: Viva Films
- Distributed by: Viva Films
- Release date: February 14, 1991
- Running time: 124 minutes
- Country: Philippines
- Language: Filipino
- Box office: ₱150 million

Maging Sino Ka Man (lit. Be Who You Are) is a 1991 Filipino romantic comedy action film written and directed by Eddie Rodriguez, with Emmanuel H. Borlaza as the co-writer. Starring Robin Padilla and Sharon Cuneta, the film tells the story of love between a Robin Hood-like thug and a famous singer who goes into hiding because of her evil stepfather. It also stars Dennis Padilla, Vina Morales, Edu Manzano, Rosemarie Gil, and Romy Rivera.

Produced and released by Viva Films on February 14, 1991 (Valentine's Day), the film became a commercial success where its box office earnings reached ₱150 million throughout its theatrical run and its production led to an actual romantic relationship between the two leads.

== Plot ==
Famous singer Monique (Sharon Cuneta) runs away from home after her mother refuses to believe that her stepfather Osmundo tried to assault her. She goes into hiding by altering her looks and assumes the name Digna. She starts to live in a shelter for women and works various odd jobs. With her past coming back to haunt her again, Monique's fate is altered with a chance encounter with Carding (Robin Padilla), a petty thief who looks after six orphaned children.

== Cast ==
- Sharon Cuneta as Monique Romero/Digna
- Robin Padilla as Carding Ermita
- Edu Manzano as Gilbert
- Vina Morales as Loleng
- Rosemarie Gil as Beatrice Romero
- Romy Rivera as Osmundo
- Suzanne Gonzales as Cleo
- Dennis Padilla as Libag
- Ali Sotto as Tala
- Rez Cortez as Alex the hitman
- Zandro Zamora as Capt. Antonio Cristobal
- Carmi Matic as Hika
- Orestes Ojeda as Ben
- Manjo del Mundo as Nick
- Joey Padilla as Joey
- Jun Hidalgo as Jun
- Dick Israel as Pando
- Malou de Guzman as Letty
- Christopher Roxas as Tambok
- Val Iglesias as Pick Pocket Rival

== Television remake ==
In July 2023, a TV adaptation remake was announced by GMA Network, with Barbie Forteza and David Licauco confirmed as playing the leads.
