= Nina Kodaka =

Filipino Japanese TV personality and host

Nina Kodaka 小高ニーナ
- Born: Nina Kodaka; June 9, 1989 (age 37); Tokyo, Japan
- Other name: Nina Mori
- Occupations: Host; TV Personality
- Years active: 2009–2016

Nina Kodaka (小高ニーナ, Kodaka Nina; born June 9, 1989) is a Filipino Japanese TV personality and host who gained media attention as a finalist on the 5th season of StarStruck, a reality-TV talent show broadcast on GMA Network.

== Personal life ==
Kodaka lived in Japan before joining StarStruck. On Startalk, after her elimination, she is the co-host in "Startalk" which is longest news show in the Philippines.

Nina's hobby is her favorite instrument was a piano.

== StarStruck V ==
Kodaka was one of the eight finalists who auditioned abroad. She advanced to the final 14 alongside Zeryl Lim (who auditioned in the Middle East) and Rye Burgos (who auditioned in the United States). She was top 3 of the girls, her batch mates are Sarah Lahbati, Diva Montelava, Rocco Nacino, Enzo Pineda, Steven Silva.

== Film ==
Year	Title	Role	Film Production
2010	You to Me are Everything	Nina	Regal Entertainment
2011	Haruo	Monica	Adolfo Alix Jr.

=== Television ===
Year	Title	Role	Network
2009	StarStruck (season 5)	Herself	GMA Network
2009	SOP	Herself/Performer	GMA Network
2010	Maynila	Herself/Performer	GMA Network
2010	Startalk	Segment host	GMA Network
2010	Party Pilipinas	Herself/Performer	GMA Network
2010	Ina, Kasusuklaman Ba Kita?	Irish	GMA Network
2010	Asar Talo Lahat Panalo!	Co-host	GMA Network
2010	Koreana	Precious Wang	GMA Network
2011	Unang Hirit	Herself/Guest	GMA Network
2013	Sunday All Stars	Herself/Guest Performer	GMA Network
2014	Magpakailanman	Mona	GMA Network
2015	Sabado Badoo	Herself/Cameo	GMA Network
2015	StarStruck (season 6)	Herself/Guest	GMA Network
2016	Sunday PinaSaya	Herself/Guest	GMA Network

== See also ==
- at iGMA.tv
- at IMDB.com
- at cchan.tv (search:Nina)
- 森ニーナ on Instagram
- 森のニーナ Nina Mori's channel on YouTube
