= Gwapings Live! =

Philippine television variety show

- Title card
- Genre: Variety show
- Presented by: Mark Anthony Fernandez; Jomari Yllana; Eric Fructuoso
- Country of origin: Philippines
- Original language: Tagalog
- No. of episodes: 51

Production
- Camera setup: Multiple-camera setup
- Running time: 90 minutes
- Production company: GMA Entertainment TV

Original release
- Network: GMA Rainbow Satellite Network
- Release: October 4, 1992 – October 10, 1993

Gwapings Live! is a Philippine television variety show broadcast by GMA Rainbow Satellite Network. Hosted by Mark Anthony Fernandez, Jomari Yllana, Eric Fructuoso and Jao Mapa, it premiered on October 4, 1992. The show concluded on October 10, 1993, with a total of 51 episodes.
