= Victor Neri =

Filipino actor and singer

- Born: Victor Luis Juan Hilado Neri; February 19, 1976 (age 50); Makati, Philippines
- Occupations: Actor, entrepreneur, chef
- Years active: 1992–present
- Political party: Independent (since 2024)
- Children: 1

Victor Luis Juan Hilado Neri (born February 19, 1976) is a Filipino actor, singer, entrepreneur, chef, and public servant.

== Personal life ==
Neri is also a chef and owns a restaurant named Saute. In 2007, Neri took a break from the entertainment industry and spent three years in Bangkok, studying Culinary Arts in Le Cordon Bleu and moonlighting as a cook in a Thai restaurant. He also spent two and a half years in Hong Kong to work for an insurance company and more than a year in Beijing to study Mandarin.

Neri also trained as a bomb disposal technician in the Philippine Coast Guard and briefly worked in the Philippines' Bureau of Immigrations' fugitive search unit.

Neri was a Catholic before joining Iglesia ni Cristo.

He worked in the Department of Social Welfare and Development first as a Driver (Administrative Aide), then suddenly, Assistant Secretary for Visayas Affairs during the term of President Rodrigo Duterte.

Actor and Ang TV co-star Christopher Roxas is his close friend.

== Political career ==
In October 2024, Neri filed his candidacy to run for mayor of Makati in 2025 as an independent.

== Filmography ==
=== Television ===
Year	Title	Role	Notes	Source
1992	Ang TV	Himself		
1993	Anna Luna	Edmond		
1994—1995	Hanggang Kailan, Anna Luna?: Ikalawang Aklat	Edmond		
1995–2006	ASAP	Co-host / performer		
1996	Love Notes	Various		
1998	Takot Ka Ba sa Dilim?	Dennis		Episode: "Phobia"
1999–2000	Liwanag ng Hatinggabi	Gabriel		
2000–2002	Kagat ng Dilim	Dino		
2001–2002	Sa Dulo ng Walang Hanggan	Joaquin Montenegro		
2002–2003	Habang Kapiling Ka	Julius Javellana		
2004	Maalaala Mo Kaya: Danny Ildefonso Life Story	Danny Ildefonso		
2005–2006	Carlo J. Caparas' Ang Panday	Lizardo		
2006–2007	Bakekang	Herman		
2007	Muli	Jaime		
2007	Dalawang Tisoy			
2014	Ipaglaban Mo: Hustisya Para Sa'yo, Anak	Andres		
2014	Hawak Kamay	Pedring		
2015	Pari 'Koy	Matthew		
2016	FPJ's Ang Probinsyano	Mayor Anton Guerrero		
2016	Ipaglaban Mo: Larawan	Bert		
2017	Pinulot Ka Lang sa Lupa	Cesar Esquivel		
2017	La Luna Sangre	Frederick Arguelles		
2018	Super Ma'am	Agalon		
2018	Inday Will Always Love You	Budots		
2018	Uniporme Hero Serye	BUCOR Usec. Ronald "Bato" Dela Rosa	The Bato Dela Rosa Story	
2019	TODA One I Love	Migs Generoso		
2019–2020	Beautiful Justice	PDEA NCR Regional Director Antonio "Tony" Bautista		
2023	Unbreak My Heart	Dante Manalad		
2024	Lavender Fields	Max Albano		
2025	Lolong: Bayani ng Bayan	Police Col. Dominador Innocenio		

=== Film ===
Year	Title	Role	Notes	Source
1993	Secret Love	Ronald's relative		
1995	Pare Ko	Lester		
1995	Hataw Na	Anton Velasco		
1995	Asero	Ratso		
1996	Utol	Joey / Lito		
1997	Amanos: Patas ang Laban	Bobby		
1997	Iskalawag: Ang Batas ay Batas	Spike		
1998	Birador	Frankie		
1998	Notoryus	Torio		
1999	Tigasin	Cpl. Ramon Ignacio		
1999	Brokedown Palace	Bellhop		
1999	Suspek	Alexander "Rex" Braga		
2000	Ex-Con	Lt. Ariel "Turo" Vergara		
2002	Videoke King	Freddie Boy		
2003	Masamang Ugat	Darwin		
2003	Filipinas	Emman Filipinas		
2005	Enteng Kabisote 2: Okay Ka Fairy Ko... The Legend Continues!	Drago		
2014	Violator	Gilberto Pring		
2016	Kabisera			
2017	Tatlong Bibe	Amado		
2018	BuyBust	Bernie Lacson		
2018	Hapi ang Buhay: The Musical	Victor		
2019	Wild Little Love	Joel		
2024	The Blood Brothers			
2024	Mamay: A Journey to Greatness			
2024	Green Bones	Carlos Pineda		
2025	Bar Boys: After School	Atty. Mendez		

== Discography ==
=== Studio albums ===
Title	Details
Victor Neri	Released: 1995; Format: Cassette, CD; Label: Star Records

=== Guest appearances ===
List of non-single guest appearances, with other performing artists, showing year released and album name
Title	Year	Other artist(s)	Album
"Beep, Beep, Beep" (with Jao Mapa, Cholo Escaño, Mykel Gonzales, Mart Mondale, Markus Robles)	1994	None	Hataw Na
