= Asero =

1995 action film by Joey del Rosario

- Official movie poster
- Directed by: Joey del Rosario
- Screenplay by: Ricky Lee
- Produced by: Malou N. Santos
- Starring: Cesar Montano; Ricky Davao
- Cinematography: Ricardo Remias
- Edited by: Joe Solo
- Music by: Nonong Buencamino
- Production company: Star Cinema
- Distributed by: Star Cinema
- Release date: August 30, 1995
- Running time: 100 minutes
- Country: Philippines
- Language: Filipino

Asero (lit. 'Steel') is a 1995 Philippine action film directed by Joey del Rosario from a screenplay written by Ricky Lee. The film stars Cesar Montano in the title role.

== Plot ==
Victor and Narding were friends since childhood. However, they both have opposite lives. Victor live in a violent family where his father would often abuse his mother physically, while Narding went to the seminary to become a priest. This resulted him to live a life of crime as a member of a syndicate led by Spade. When Spade decided to rob a bank, he had Victor do the job. But he was arrested. While in jail, Narding now a priest visited Victor and told him that his parents died in a vehicular accident. After visiting his parents' wake, Spade came and there, Victor asked for his share of the crime. Victor was eventually released. He gained the trust and respect of a group of youths who are Narding's students. This made Narding furious and told him not to drag the boys to evil.

With the help of Vivian, a tabloid reporter and Victor's childhood neighbor, she would find a way for Victor to change. As for Victor, he used Vivian to publish a report on Spade's syndicate and a police colonel Marino is their protector. Marino then called Vivian telling him that there will be a big surprise for her at nightfall. By nightfall, Vivian's mother Mameng was murdered by Colonel Marino. Victor would later kill Colonel Marino and called Vivian about his final encounter with Spade. Narding asked Vivian to call the police to end bloodshed. Victor fought Spade and his men and they were all killed. Narding came and asked Victor to surrender. However, Victor insisted that it's already too late for him to change. A policeman shot Victor from afar. Vivian came and asked him not to fight back.

Victor was arrested and convicted of multiple murder. He was given a death sentence and his execution came a year and a half later.

== Cast ==
Main cast

- Cesar Montano as Victor Asero
  - Patrick Garcia as Young Victor
- Gelli de Belen as Vivian
  - Paula Peralejo as Young Vivian
- Ricky Davao as Narding
  - Kristopher Peralta as Young Narding

Supporting cast

- Bembol Roco as Spade
- Al Tantay as Bugoy
- Lito Legaspi as Col. Marino
- Jao Mapa as Troy
- Alfred Manal as Tisoy
- Victor Neri as Ratso
- Mark Vernal as Bembo
- Kevin Vernal as Bentot
- Christopher Roxas as Turko
- Jason San Pedro as Topak
- Eruel Tongco as Mando
- Susan Africa as Chayong
- Gamaliel Viray as Editor
- Cita Astals as Aling Mameng
- Lucita Soriano as Narding's Foster Mother
- Ernie Zarate as Narding's Foster Father
- Joe Jardi as Barangay Chairman
- Elvira Manal as Mrs. Soriano
- Pilar Asuncion as Aling Clara
- Mae-ann Adonis as Video Shop Attendant
- Marieta Cruz as Video Shop Helper
- Freddie Ondra as Rocky Gaston
- Oscar Moran as Kid Bulldog
- Tony Tacorda as Warden
- Nonoy Arispe as Boxing Referee
