= Manila's Finest =

Manila's Finest may refer to:

- Manila's Finest (2015 film), directed by William G. Mayo
- Manila's Finest (2025 film), directed by Raymond Red
