= R. D. Alba =

Indian television director

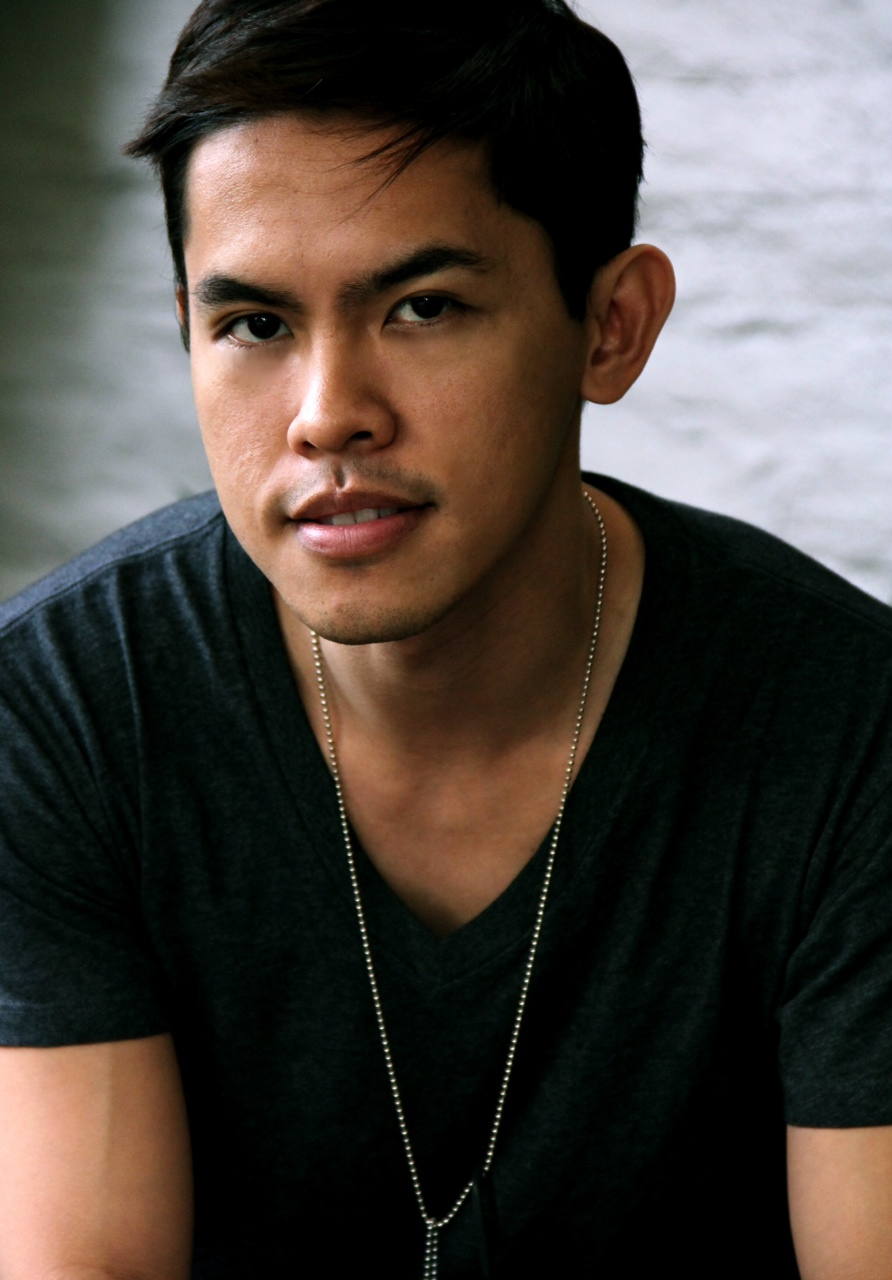
- R. D. Alba, 2010
- Born: September 4, 1978 (age 46); Cebu, Philippines
- Years active: 2002-present

José Simplicio Yap Alba or José Simplicio Alba III, better known as R. D. Alba after his parents' initials, is a film and television director. He was born in Cebu, Philippines on September 4, 1978 to parents Drs. Disi Yap and Rey Cadagat Alba. He is the eldest of five children.

Alba studied drama at Jacksonville State University in Alabama and moved to Los Angeles to study film directing at the Los Angeles Film School in Hollywood, California.

== Career ==
At age 23, Alba became the youngest filmmaker to direct 175 episodes of a serial drama TV series on ABS-CBN Regional Network, titled Kapalaran.

He then produced the award-winning Panaghoy sa suba, directed by Cesar Montano.

He directed a remake of the popular sitcom Milyonaryong Mini on ABS-CBN for 60 episodes.

In 2011, he directed Biktima, which was to be released on September 19, 2012 by Star Cinema. It starred Angel Aquino and Cesar Montano.

He finished directing a talk show on TFC (The Filipino Channel) titled RSVP, with Giselle Tongi and Dr. Tess Mauricio, which aired in fall of 2011 and wrapped its second season in April 2012. It aired on GMA Pinoy TV from June to September 2012.

He directed Seasons 1 and 2 of The On Your Marc Show, Lifestyle Network's top-rated show.

=== Filmography ===
Year	Title	Position	Company
2002	Kapalaran	Director	ABS-CBN Regional Network
2004	Panaghoy sa Suba	Producer	CM Films
2006	Milyonaryong Mini	Director	ABS-CBN Regional Network
2011	RSVP	Director	TFC (ABS-CBN)
2012	RSVP with Dr. Tess	Director	GMA Pinoy TV
2012	BIKTIMA	Director	Alba Productions / Star Cinema
2013	The Dr. Tess Show Seasons 1 & 2	Director	GMA Pinoy TV
2013	Binibining Pilipinas USA 2013	Director	TFC (ABS-CBN)
2014	The Dr. Tess Show Seasons 3 & 4	Director	GMA Pinoy TV
2014	The On Your Marc Show Season 1	Director	The Lifestyle Network
2014	Binibining Pilipinas USA 2014	Director	GMA Pinoy TV
2015	The On Your Marc Show Season 2	Director	The Lifestyle Network
