= List of Impostora episodes =

The following is a list of episodes for Impostora, a Filipino drama series created by RJ Nuevas and produced by GMA Network. The series premiered on June 4, 2007 on the network's coveted GMA Telebabad block replacing Super Twins, and concluded on September 21, 2007. It also aired internationally via GMA Pinoy TV from June 20, 2007 until October 9, 2007. GMA Life TV is also aired the series' English-dubbed version from September 23, 2011 until January 10, 2012. The series headlined Sunshine Dizon, Iza Calzado, Mark Anthony Fernandez and Alfred Vargas as the lead casts. Maryo J. de los Reyes, Soxy Topacio and Lore Reyes directed the show. Winnie Hollis-Reyes and Mona Mayuga were the executive producers for the entire run of the series.

The 45-minute scripted drama chronicles the lives and loves of the former conjoined twins, Sara Carrion and Lara Carrion and how their fates are intertwined by love, deceit, hatred and vengeance.

Impostora received positive reviews from viewers and critics throughout its run and an instant hit from its debut. The series continues in syndication worldwide.

== Main cast ==
- Sunshine Dizon as Sara carrion / Vanessa Cayetano
- Iza Calzado as Lara Carrion / Sara Carrion
- Mark Anthony Fernandez as Nicolas "Nick" Cayetano
- Alfred Vargas as Carlos Pambide
- Jean Garcia as Bettina "Betty" Carrion

== Episodes ==
No.	Title	Original release date
1	"The Conjoined Twins"	June 4, 2007
2	"The Conjoined Twins"	June 5, 2007
3	"The Conjoined Twins"	June 6, 2007
4	"The Conjoined Twins"	June 7, 2007
5	"The Conjoined Twins"	June 8, 2007
Lara and Sara are conjoined twins. Their parents Henry and Adelle only want the best for the twins. They cannot imagine the kind of life they will have if they grow up conjoined. They are bothered when they are teased by their schoolmates and the neighbors see them as an amusement. The dream to have them separated grows. Meanwhile, a non profit organization that helps families with rare medical conditions extended their help to Adelle. The future looks bright for the twins as an anonymous donor offers to provide for the conjoined twin's surgery for free. The family is very happy. Adelle continues to worry because she thinks that no matter how hard she works she will not be able to provide enough for her daughters. One relative comes to Adelle and offers to adopt one of her daughters.
6	"Foretold Misfortune"	June 11, 2007
7	"Foretold Misfortune"	June 12, 2007
8	"Foretold Misfortune"	June 13, 2007
9	"Foretold Misfortune"	June 14, 2007
10	"Foretold Misfortune"	June 15, 2007
A fire then destroyed Adelle’s house and a car accident killed Delfin, leaving the family with nowhere to live in and no one to turn to. Lara's adoptive parents are not rich but their kindness is more than what Lara asks for. Sara is also lucky to have a surrogate mother who loves her dearly. The big scar on her face is a reminder of a horrible past; people teased her terribly because of her scar. But maybe it's true that some people can see beyond the scar. A boy named Ramil befriends her.
11	"Twelve Years Gone"	June 18, 2007
12	"Twelve Years Gone"	June 19, 2007
13	"Twelve Years Gone"	June 20, 2007
14	"Twelve Years Gone"	June 21, 2007
15	"Twelve Years Gone"	June 22, 2007
Lara crosses paths with the cousin she hates and Sara continues to hide her face from the public in fear of criticism. Vanessa is plain cruel and rude to other people. Her popularity as a model can match her spiteful ways. Her husband is so blinded in love that he cannot tell her to change. Sara tries to end her life -- but a kind man saves her and offers her a chance to change it as well.
16	"Switched Lives"	June 25, 2007
17	"Switched Lives"	June 26, 2007
18	"Switched Lives"	June 27, 2007
19	"Switched Lives"	June 28, 2007
20	"Switched Lives"	June 29, 2007
Sara is bound for Manila but the bus she rides hits a boulder. Passengers are brought to the hospital. There, she meets a doctor who offers to help her. The rift between Vanessa and Nicolas grows. He suspects Vanessa is having an affair with another man. Sara, on the other hand, begs Dr. Leandro for help. She urges him to remove the scar so her enemies can no longer recognize her. Doctor Leandro agrees.
21	"Trapped"	July 2, 2007
22	"Trapped"	July 3, 2007
23	"Trapped"	July 4, 2007
24	"Trapped"	July 5, 2007
25	"Trapped"	July 6, 2007
Vanessa and Leandro finally reveal their plan to Sara. Sara could not believe her fate. Doña Anatella is determined to find Vanessa because not only did she steal money, she also took the jewelleries from her shop. When they found her, Sara denied all their accusation since she is not the real Vanessa. Nicolas is sure that Vanessa is just pretending but the doctor tells them that she is suffering from amnesia. Nicolas hides Sara in a basement where no one can hear her. Sara tells Anatella and Nicolas that she is not Vanessa. Anatella was furious so she filed a case against Vanessa and her mother Bettina. Nicolas finds out that he lost a very large amount of money and that Vanessa has transferred all that money to her personal account. He rushes home to confront Sara. Nicolas refuses her mom's suggestion to separate with his wife or just kill her. Meanwhile, Sara tried to commit suicide and was rushed to the hospital. Lara on the other hand was stubbed by a stranger and was also rushed to the hospital.
26	"The Life of An Impostor"	July 9, 2007
27	"The Life of An Impostor"	July 10, 2007
28	"The Life of An Impostor"	July 11, 2007
29	"The Life of An Impostor"	July 12, 2007
30	"The Life of An Impostor"	July 13, 2007
Sara noticed that the kids and Anatella were not happy to see her, after Nicolas brought her home. She learned that Sara does treat the kids very well. Sara does not know what happened between Vanessa and her kids and mother in law. They were suspecting that it was only an act put up by Sara to escape. Anatella got a call from a lawyer, demanding her to pay the jewelleries that Vanessa took from their shop. Anatella is trying to make Sara confess where she hid the jewelleries and even tortured her. Then Nicolas came with Lara and the twins met for the first time.
31	"One Man, Two Sisters"	July 16, 2007
32	"One Man, Two Sisters"	July 17, 2007
33	"One Man, Two Sisters"	July 18, 2007
34	"One Man, Two Sisters"	July 19, 2007
35	"One Man, Two Sisters"	July 20, 2007
Lara decided to be nice to “Vanessa”, after the woman treated her kindly, which also made Lara feel worse for having feelings for Nicholas. But love will have to be put aside for Lara after she found her Aunt Betty.
36	"Jealousy and Paranoia"	July 23, 2007
37	"Jealousy and Paranoia"	July 24, 2007
38	"Jealousy and Paranoia"	July 25, 2007
39	"Jealousy and Paranoia"	July 26, 2007
40	"Jealousy and Paranoia"	July 27, 2007
Sara slowly fell in love with the man Vanessa left behind. When Betty pushed her to fight for her husband, Sara became the jealous wife Vanessa never was. Sara's improving situation with Vanessa's family will be shrouded by a dark cloud when Anatella returns to the mansion.
41	"The Real Vanessa"	July 30, 2007
42	"The Real Vanessa"	July 31, 2007
43	"The Real Vanessa"	August 1, 2007
44	"The Real Vanessa"	August 2, 2007
45	"The Real Vanessa"	August 3, 2007
Sara had become sure of her place in the Cayetano household. With the love of a family, Sara finally knew what it felt like to belong to something.
46	"An Ally for Sara"	August 6, 2007
47	"An Ally for Sara"	August 7, 2007
48	"An Ally for Sara"	August 8, 2007
49	"An Ally for Sara"	August 9, 2007
50	"An Ally for Sara"	August 10, 2007
Doña Anatella had discovered the real identity of “Vanessa," but instead of throwing her out, Anatella embraced her with open arms.
51	"Looking for Trouble"	August 13, 2007
52	"Looking for Trouble"	August 14, 2007
53	"Looking for Trouble"	August 15, 2007
54	"Looking for Trouble"	August 16, 2007
55	"Looking for Trouble"	August 17, 2007
Carlos continued to help Lara with her problems, making the latter feel uncomfortable at the hospitality being shown her.
56	"Face to Face"	August 20, 2007
57	"Face to Face"	August 21, 2007
58	"Face to Face"	August 22, 2007
59	"Face to Face"	August 23, 2007
60	"Face to Face"	August 24, 2007
Lara goes to the mansion with a plan to get her revenge on Vanessa. But she changed her mind when she saw Vanessa's kids. Betty is suspicious of Vanessa's scar and went to see Vanessa to ask to see her back and her scar. Anatella arrived on time to stop Betty and asks her to leave instead. Still suspicious Betty follows Vanessa and Anatella and discovers the other Vanessa inside the warehouse.
61	"Botched Plans"	August 27, 2007
62	"Botched Plans"	August 28, 2007
63	"Botched Plans"	August 29, 2007
64	"Botched Plans"	August 30, 2007
65	"Botched Plans"	August 31, 2007
Betty helps her daughter escape from the warehouse. Carlos tells Lara to go to the party for Vanessa and seek her revenge. Nicolas presents her wife to everyone and tells them that he is happy to be with her. The real Vanessa makes an appearance, points to Sara and announces that she is just an impostor. Although they already know the identity of Sara, Nicolas and the kids still love and hasn't changed. Vanessa visits the house and kisses Nicolas, she still insists that it is her that he wants and not Sara who looks only like her. Nicolas tells Vanessa that he doesn't feel any love for her anymore and proposes marriage to Sara afterwards. Vanessa consults a lawyer as she wants to sue Nicolas and Sara for adultery.
66	"Role Reversal"	September 3, 2007
67	"Role Reversal"	September 4, 2007
68	"Role Reversal"	September 5, 2007
69	"Role Reversal"	September 6, 2007
70	"Role Reversal"	September 7, 2007
For so long, Sara had to pretend that she was Vanessa -- and in a sudden twist of fate, it is now Vanessa who must become the impostor. Days passed... Vanessa insists on living in the mansion with Sara, Nicolas and the kids. She claims that she is still the legal wife and has every right to stay in the house with her husband and children. She even ordered the aids to transfer Sara's belonging to the guest room and plans to share the master's bedroom with Nicolas.
71	"Between Life and Death"	September 10, 2007
72	"Between Life and Death"	September 11, 2007
73	"Between Life and Death"	September 12, 2007
74	"Between Life and Death"	September 13, 2007
75	"Between Life and Death"	September 14, 2007
Vanessa is thrown out of the house by Nicolas and goes back to her mother Betty. Betty plans that Vanessa asks for apology and tell Nicolas that she is to leave for America. But they will kidnap Sara and Vanessa will again go home to Nicolas as Sara. Meanwhile, Lara is waiting for Vanessa outside the house of Nicolas and she mistakenly abducts Sara, her twin sister as she looks exactly like Vanessa. Fritzy witnesses the abduction and follows Sara. She then tells the people in the house of Sara. Vanessa and Betty goes with Fritzy and hits Lara on the head. Vanessa succeeds in making the switch. Everybody in the house really thinks that she is Sara. But the maids noticed the difference in her actions and words. Lara wakes up and is able to escape the burning room. Fritzy is surprised to see Lara back in the house of Carlos. The twists and turns are getting sharper before Lara and Sara reach their final destination.
76	"An Explosive Finale"	September 17, 2007
77	"An Explosive Finale"	September 18, 2007
78	"An Explosive Finale"	September 19, 2007
79	"An Explosive Finale"	September 20, 2007
80	"An Explosive Finale"	September 21, 2007
Betty showed Vanessa her trunk that contained dynamite. And this week, she’s all set to use it! Sara arrives at the house where Betty is waiting for her. Vanessa learns from Sophia that her mother met with Sara at an old rented house. Betty learns from Sophia that Vanessa is on her way to the house, Betty goes back to get her daughter because she already set off the bomb to kill Sara. The bomb explodes setting the house on fire. Nicolas was able to save Sara but he is stopped by the firemen from going back inside to save the two other women. Meanwhile, Betty lives but her legs were already amputated. Vanessa learns about the wedding of Nicolas and Sara and plans to ruin it. She then asks the help of Sophia. On the day of the wedding Lara gives Sara a pack of coins that she believes would bring good luck to her sister. On the way to the church Sara meets Sophia who points a gun at her and asked her go get down from the car. Vanessa also in a wedding dress boarded the card and heads for the church. Lara sensed that the Sara she accompanied to the altar is not her sister until Sara arrives at the church and stopped the wedding. Leandro chanced at Vanessa and poured acid on her face. Sophia and Betty got into a car accident and died on the spot. Nicolas weds Sara.

== Ratings ==
Viewership rankings among the Top TV shows of the week days (Mega Manila). The peak rankings is among that day's Top TV shows.

Week	Date	Average	Peak
1	2007/06/04-08	28.5% (5th)	30.3% (2nd)
2	2007/06/11-15	28.9% (4th)	30.8% (4th)
3	2007/06/18-22	29.4% (4th)	31.9% (3rd)
4	2007/06/25-29	28.9% (5th)	30.9% (2nd)
5	2007/07/02-06	28.3% (5th)	32.0% (1st)
6	2007/07/09-13	30.0% (3rd)	31.5% (1st)
7	2007/07/16-20	30.4% (2nd)	32.4% (1st)
8	2007/07/23-27	30.3% (2nd)	33.6% (2nd)
9	2007/07-08/30-03	31.4% (3rd)	32.3% (3rd)
10	2007/08/06-10	33.2% (2nd)	35.7% (2nd)
11	2007/08/13-17	32.3% (3rd)	33.9% (2nd)
12	2007/08/20-24	31.2% (3rd)	31.9% (3rd)
13	2007/08/27-31	31.7% (3rd)	32.8% (3rd)
14	2007/09/03-07	33.8% (1st)	35.9% (1st)
15	2007/09/10-14	34.2% (3rd)	37.8% (2nd)
16	2007/09/17-21	34.1% (2nd)	37.6% (1st)
Average		31.04%	33.21%
