= Eric Fructuoso =

Filipino actor

- Born: Frederick John Marco M. Fructuoso Jr. March 3, 1977 (age 49); Parañaque, Metro Manila, Philippines
- Other names: Eric Fructuso, Eric Fructoso
- Occupations: Actor; comedian; Businessman
- Years active: 1991–present
- Agent(s): Freelancer (1991–present); Viva Artists Agency (2023–present)
- Television: ABS-CBN; GMA Network; TV5
- Height: 5 ft 7 in (170 cm)
- Spouse: Gian
- Children: 5

Frederick John Marco Magdaluyo Fructuoso Jr. (born March 3, 1977) is a Filipino actor, comedian, businessman, and former hip hop dancer. He rose to fame in the early 1990s as part of the teen boy group Gwapings, along with Mark Anthony Fernandez, Jomari Yllana, and later Jao Mapa.

== Early life and background ==
Fructuoso's debut TV appearance was on the sitcom Palibhasa Lalake, with co-stars former Ormoc Mayor Richard Gomez, former Parañaque Mayor Joey Marquez, John Estrada, former Parañaque Vice Mayor & former Quezon City Board Member Anjo Yllana, Gloria Romero, Cynthia Patag, Amy Perez-Castillo, Bearwin Meily, Carmina Villaruel-Legaspi, Jackie Manzano-Yllana, Regine Tolentino-Vera Perez, Jao Mapa, Antonio Aquitania, former Ang TV stars singers Lindsay Custodio and Rica Peralejo-Bonifacio.

Fructuoso's 1st debut movie was Gwapings the Movie. It was produced by Regal Entertainment in 1992, with his fellow Gwapings co-stars former councilor Jo Mari Yllana and Mark Anthony Fernandez.

== Acting career ==
Fructuoso's other TV projects include Kadenang Ginto. The 2021 comedy Dyagwar: Havey Or Waley, marked his comeback movie after a nine-year hiatus.

As of 2023, Fructuoso is a new VIVA artist. The comedy film Para Kang Papa Mo was produced by VIVA Entertainment, with his co-Gwapings stars Mark Anthony Fernandez, actor turned painter Jao Mapa, former Hastags dancer member Nikko Natividad and Ruby Ruiz.

Fructuoso has recently portrayed mature roles, particularly villain roles, father characters and supporting roles.

== Personal life ==
Fructuoso is the grandson of Carlos Magdaluyo, who is a former director of PAGCOR. He is of Aklanon descent.

He has had relationships with actresses Ara Mina, Joyce Jimenez, Aubrey Miles, Priscilla Almeda and Toni Gonzaga.

He was the boyfriend of Claudine Barretto before Mark Anthony Fernandez.

Fructuoso was married to a non-showbiz woman named Gian, with whom he has four children. They separated sometime in 2021 after 16 years of marriage. He also has one child named Frederick III ("Tres") from another previous ex-wife.

Besides acting, Fructuoso also used to have a construction business shared with his ex-wife Gian. He currently owns a fast food chain called Gwapigs Porkchop and a motorcycle shop called Gwapings Moto Powered by ETech.

In 2021, Fructuoso became a grandfather at age 44 when his then-21-year-old eldest son Frederick fathered a son named Leo with his wife Anne Carlene.

== Acting credits ==
=== Film ===
Key
†	Denotes films that have not yet been released

Eric Fructuoso's film credits with year of release, film titles and roles
Year	Title	Role	Ref.
1992	Gwapings: The First Adventure	Archie	
1993	Gwapings Dos	Alvin	
1993	Dino... Abangan Ang Susunod Na...	Fructuoso first comedy movie	
1993	Makati Ave., Office Girls		
1993	Teen-age Mama		
1994	Bulag, Pipi at Bingi		
1994	Sobra Talaga... Overrr!		
1994	Ging Gang Gooly Giddiyap: I Love You Daddy	Emil	
1995	Eskapo	Raffy Lopez	
1995	Magic Kombat	Luigi	
1995	Rollerboys	Busty Morales	
1996	Sa Kamay ng Batas	Darwin	
1996	Unang Tibok		
1996	Virgin Island		
1997	Kulayan Natin Ang Bukas	Jay	
1997	Wang Wang, Buhay Bombero		
1997	Manananggal In Manila	Jonas	
1997	Mama, Dito Sa Aking Puso		
2000	Most Wanted		
2009	T2	Elias	
2012	Djagwar: Havey O Waley	Ruel	
2021	On the Job: The Missing 8		
2023	Para Kang Papa Mo	Ric	
2025	Golden Scenery of Tomorrow		
2025	Rekonek	Gino	

=== Television ===
Key
†	Denotes shows that have not yet been aired

Eric Fructuoso's television credits with year of release, title(s) and role
Year	Title	Role	Ref.
1991–1998	Palibhasa Lalake	Himself	
1992	Tropang Trumpo	Himself	
1993	Maalaala Mo Kaya: Walkman		
1993	Eye to Eye	Himself	
1994	Love Notes	Various	
1994	Mikee	Various	
1995	GMA Telesine Specials	Various	
1995–2000	Bubble Gang	Himself	
1998	Esperanza	Tonyo	
2005	Maynila		
2005	Carlo J. Caparas' Ang Panday	Gumma	
2006	Maalaala Mo Kaya: Palaisdaan	Manuel	
2007	Pinoy Mano-Mano: The Celebrity Boxing Challenge	Himself / contestant	
2007	Maalaala Mo Kaya: Bisikleta	Carding	
2007	Super Inggo 1.5: Ang Bagong Bangis	Tikbalang King	
2008	Lobo	Rodolfo	
2009	Maalaala Mo Kaya: Reseta	Jaime	
2010	Agimat Presents: Tonyong Bayawak	Brandon Inocencio	
2010	Noah	Jose Isaac Perez	
2010	Precious Hearts Romances Presents: Martha Cecilia's Kristine	Alfon De Silva	
2011	Maalaala Mo Kaya: Cupcake	Rico	
2011	Maalaala Mo Kaya: Tulay	Kuya Rudy	
2011	Wansapanataym: Dirty Larry	Daddy	
2011	Nasaan Ka, Elisa?	Bruno De Silva	
2012	Wansapanataym: Remote Emote	Emerson	
2012	It's Showtime	Himself / Guest Hurado	
2012	Lorenzo's Time	young Badong	
2012	Wansapanataym: Kids vs. Zombies	Mr. Santos	
2012	Angelito: Ang Bagong Yugto	Larry Samaniego	
2013	Apoy sa Dagat	Tristan Corpuz / Theodoro Balitaan	
2013	Carlo J. Caparas' Dugong Buhay		
2013	Maalaala Mo Kaya: Elevator		
2014	Ipaglaban Mo: Lalaban Ang Tatay Para Sa'yo	Edgar	
2015	Magpakailanman	Various	
2015	Karelasyon	Various	
2015	Dangwa	Various	
2015	Sabado Badoo	Himself / cameo footage featured	
2016	FPJ's Ang Probinsyano	Benjamin Joseph "Banjo" Moreno	
2016	Ipaglaban Mo: Kapansanan	Pepe	
2016	Maalaala Mo Kaya: Pantalan	Dodong	
2016	Wansapanataym: Holly & Mau	Jack Benitez	
2017	Dear Uge	Various	
2018	Tadhana: Pilit Na Pag-Ibig	Ibrahim	
2018–2019	Kadenang Ginto	Alvin Mangubat	
2020	24/7	Gregorio "Rigor" Baltazar	
2020	Tadhana: Bayad Danyos	Albert	
2022–2023	Mars Ravelo's Darna	Arthur Pineda	
2023	Family Feud	Himself / Contestant	
2023	FPJ's Batang Quiapo	Banjo	
2023–2024	Nag-aapoy na Damdamin	Bruno	
2024	TiktoClock	Himself / Guest host	
2024	Rainbow Rumble	Himself / Contestant	
2024–2025	Saving Grace	Oscar Jimenez	
2025	Regal Studio Presents: Mami and Papi Together	Dennis	
2025	Sins of the Father	Matthias Vergara	
2025–present	ASAP XP	Himself – performer / host	
2026	Blood vs Duty	Roland Solares	
2026	Kapamilya, Deal or No Deal	Himself	
2026	Eat Bulaga!	Himself / The Age is Right Agent	
2026	Face to Face with Ate Koring	Himself / Guest	
2026	Fast Talk with Boy Abunda	Himself / Guest	

=== Digital series ===
Year	Title	Role	Ref.
2025–2026	Golden Scenery of Tomorrow	Ranil Diaz	

== Accolades ==
Awards and nominations received by Eric Fructuoso
Year	Award	Category	Nominated work	Result
1992	6th PMPC Star Awards for TV	Best New TV Personality	Palibhasa Lalake	Nominated
2022	Pinoy Rebyu Award	Winner, Best Ensemble Performance	On the Job 2: The Missing 8	Won
