= Violator (film) =

2014 film by Eduardo "Dodo" Dayao

- Film poster
- Directed by: Eduardo "Dodo" Dayao
- Written by: Eduardo "Dodo" Dayao
- Produced by: Tonee Acejo; Lawrence S. Ang; Eduardo "Dodo" Dayao
- Starring: Victor Neri; Anthony Falcon; RK Bagatsing; Timothy Mabalot; Andy Bais; Joel Lamangan
- Cinematography: Gym Lumbera; Albert Banzon; Timmy Harn (VHS)
- Edited by: Lawrence S. Ang
- Music by: Ace Cada; Marcushiro Nada
- Production companies: Cinema One Originals; Quiapost; Is It Safe?
- Release date: November 10, 2014 (Cinema One Originals)
- Running time: 101 minutes
- Country: Philippines
- Languages: Filipino; English

Violator (stylized as VIOLA†OR) is a 2014 Filipino psychological horror film written and directed by Eduardo "Dodo" Dayao. It stars Victor Neri, Anthony Falcon, RK Bagatsing, Timothy Mabalot, Andy Bais, and Joel Lamangan. It premiered at the Cinema One Originals film festival, where it won Best Editing, Best Picture, Best Sound, and Best Supporting Actor for Bais. At the Gawad Urian Awards, it won Best Sound and was nominated for Best Cinematography, Best Editing, and Best Supporting Actor for Lamangan.

== Premise ==
At the height of a super-typhoon that could well be the first wave of an impending Apocalypse, five men take refuge in a flooded-in police station and spend the rest of the night with a prisoner who may or may not be the Devil.

== Cast ==
- Victor Neri as Gilberto Pring
- Anthony Falcon as Lukas Manabat
- RK Bagatsing as Gabriel Ragas
- Timothy Mabalot as Nathan Winston Payumo
- Andy Bais as Vic
- Joel Lamangan as Benito Alano

== Production ==
Writer-director Dayao is a film critic, and Violator is his directorial debut. He says the step was natural to him, though he accepts others find it less so. When casting the film, Dayao consciously cast the actors against type. All of the actors were his first choices, and they all took the roles that he desired.

== Release ==
Violator premiered on November 10, 2014, at the Cinema One Originals film festival.

== Reception ==
Derek Elley of Film Business Asia rated the film 6 out of 10 stars and, while calling it an impressive debut, wrote that it "is stronger on technique than actual content". Richard Kuipers of Variety wrote, "This stylishly assembled Filipino chiller creates plenty of intrigue but can't quite deliver a knockout punch." Michael Atkinson of The Village Voice called it "an apocalyptic creep-out as heavy with atmosphere and portent as a doomsday sermon". Todd Brown of Twitch Film called it "a gorgeously executed and tightly controlled exercise in religious dread".

Awards
Year	Organization	Award	Awardee	Result	Ref
2014	Cinema One Originals	Best Sound	Corinne De San Jose	Won	
2014	Cinema One Originals	Best Editing	Lawrence Ang	Won	
2014	Cinema One Originals	Best Supporting Actor	Andy Bais	Won	
2014	Cinema One Originals	Best Film	Violator	Won	
2015	Gawad Urian Award	Best Sound	Corinne De San Jose	Won	
2015	Gawad Urian Award	Best Supporting Actor	Joel Lamangan	Nominated	
2015	Gawad Urian Award	Best Cinematography	Alber Banzon and Gym Lumbera	Nominated	
2015	Gawad Urian Award	Best Editing	Lawrence Ang	Nominated	
