= Pare Ko (film) =

1995 film by Jose Javier Reyes

- Directed by: Jose Javier Reyes
- Written by: Jose Javier Reyes
- Produced by: Charo Santos-Concio; Lily Y. Monteverde; Simon C. Ongpin
- Starring: Mark Anthony Fernandez; Jomari Yllana; Jao Mapa; Claudine Barretto; Gio Alvarez; Nikka Valencia; Victor Neri
- Cinematography: Ely Cruz
- Edited by: George Jarlego
- Music by: Eric Antonio; Carlo Bulahan
- Production company: Star Cinema
- Distributed by: Star Cinema
- Release date: 11 January 1995
- Running time: 119 minutes
- Country: Philippines
- Language: Filipino

Pare Ko (English: My Man) is a 1995 Philippine coming of age slice of life youth drama film written and directed by Jose Javier Reyes. The film's title is derived and inspired from the hit 1993 song of the same name by the alt-rock band Eraserheads. Starring Mark Anthony Fernandez, Jomari Yllana, Jao Mapa, Claudine Barretto, Gio Alvarez, Nikka Valencia, and Victor Neri, the film revolves around a group of teenage friends who are struggling in their own everyday lives like romance, family bonds, and treasured friendships. Supporting and special participation cast include Elizabeth Oropesa, Edgar Mortiz, Tessie Tomas, Gina Pareño, Ramil Rodriguez, Koko Trinidad, and Anita Linda.

Produced and distributed by Star Cinema, it was theatrically released on 11 January 1995 and it is the film studio's first offering for that year. The band Rivermaya, a newcomer in the music scene at that time, appeared in the film as the performing group in the nightclub. At the 19th Gawad Urian Awards, the film earned ten nominations including Best Film, Best Director (Reyes), and Best Actor (Mapa and Yllana), winning one for Best Music (Antonio and Bulahan).

In 2015, the film was digitally restored and remastered in high definition by ABS-CBN Film Restoration, in partnership with Central Digital Lab.

== Synopsis ==
Teenagers Francis, Mackie, Chipper, Abe, Carol, and Lester have bonded together as a group and they go places like bars, movie theaters, and fast-food restaurants to have fun and socialize. As the story progresses, the friendship of the group's members is tested when a shy teenage girl of their age from a dysfunctional family comes along.

== Cast ==
=== Main cast ===
- Mark Anthony Fernandez as Francis
- Jomari Yllana as Mackie Sto. Domingo
- Jao Mapa as Chipper Lorenzo
- Claudine Barretto as Nadine
- Gio Alvarez as Abe
- Nikka Valencia as Carol
- Victor Neri as Lester

=== Supporting cast ===
- Elizabeth Oropesa as Aida Sto. Domingo, Mackie and his siblings' mother
- Edgar Mortiz as Noel Sto. Domingo, Mackie and his siblings' father
- Koko Trinidad as Peping, Chipper's grandfather
- Anita Linda as Auring, Chipper's grandmother
- Gina Pareño as Isabel Lorenzo, Chipper's mother
- Tessie Tomas as Susan Paredes, Nadine's mother
- Ramil Rodriguez as Butch Paredes, Nadine's father
- Paco Arespacochaga as Jon
- Lailani Terrobias as Sophia Sto. Domingo
- Polly Yllana as Lito Sto. Domingo
- Angeli Sharma as Anna Sto. Domingo
- Joanne Hulano as Rosie, the maid of the Sto. Domingo family
- Isabel Rivas as Madelaine, mother of Francis
- Mia Gutierrez as Cleo Regalado
- Mon Confiado as Raymond Regalado
- Janice Ortigas as Irene Regalado
- Susie Sayson as Yaya, the Paredes family maid
- Eddie Infante as Vicente
- Carlos Veridiano as Michael Lorenzo
- Boboy Garrovillo as Dong Martinez
- Madeleine Nicolas as Pilar Martinez
- Ogie Diaz as Mr. Holgado, an interfering manager of Carl's Jr.
- Farrah Florer as Marissa
- Erica Fife as Arlene
- Liza Arenas as May
- Aurora Halili as Marilen
- UST Fine Arts students as Girls

=== Cameo appearances ===
- Bamboo Mañalac as himself (Note: Credited under "Rivermaya". Attributed to this reference:)
- Nathan Azarcon as himself
- Rico Blanco as himself
- Mark Escueta as himself

== Production ==
According to the recollections of Jose Javier Reyes, the writer and director of the film, the film's production began when they were discussing with the studio producers Charo Santos-Concio, Malou N. Santos, and Simon C. Ongpin about the possibility of making a film about Filipino youth that define the 1990s decade. Inspired by the successes of the film Bagets, a 1984 film directed by Maryo J. de los Reyes, in the 1980s, they decided to create it with a title based on the hit song by the Eraserheads.

=== Casting ===
In a 2015 interview at the premiere of the film's restored version, the film introduced Jao Mapa, who played the role of Chipper, as a lead star to the cinematic audience while Nikka Valencia, who played the role of Carol, previously collaborated with writer-director Jose Javier Reyes in the 1993 film May Minamahal.

== Music ==
Despite the film's title being based on a hit Eraserheads song, Rivermaya, a then-newcomer band who appeared as themselves, performed their songs "Ulan" and "Halik sa Araw" in the scene where the group of friends are at a nightclub.

== Reception ==
=== Accolades ===
Accolades received by Pare Ko
Year	Award	Category	Recipient(s)	Result	Ref.
1995	1995 Gawad Urian Awards	Best Film	Pare Ko	Nominated	
1995	1995 Gawad Urian Awards	Best Director	Jose Javier Reyes	Nominated	
1995	1995 Gawad Urian Awards	Best Screenplay	Jose Javier Reyes	Nominated	
1995	1995 Gawad Urian Awards	Best Actor	Jao Mapa	Nominated	
1995	1995 Gawad Urian Awards	Best Actor	Jomari Yllana	Nominated	
1995	1995 Gawad Urian Awards	Best Cinematography	Ely Cruz	Nominated	
1995	1995 Gawad Urian Awards	Best Editing	George Jarlego	Nominated	
1995	1995 Gawad Urian Awards	Best Production Design	Edel Templonuevo	Nominated	
1995	1995 Gawad Urian Awards	Best Sound	Ramon Reyes	Nominated	
1995	1995 Gawad Urian Awards	Best Music	Eric Antonio and Carlo Bulahan	Won	
