= Alas-Dose =

2001 action film by Augusto Salvador

- Film poster
- Directed by: Augusto Salvador
- Screenplay by: Sigfreid Sanchez; Edgar Ilao
- Story by: Cesar Montano
- Produced by: Vincent del Rosario III
- Starring: Cesar Montano; Christopher de Leon
- Cinematography: Rolly Manuel; Richard Padernal
- Edited by: Danny Gloria
- Music by: Edwin "Kiko" Ortega
- Production company: Viva Films
- Distributed by: Viva Films
- Release date: May 30, 2001
- Running time: 117 minutes
- Country: Philippines
- Languages: Filipino; English

Alas-Dose (marketed as Alas Dose) is a 2001 Philippine action film directed by Augusto Salvador. The film stars Cesar Montano, who wrote the story, and Christopher de Leon.

The film is streaming online on YouTube.

== Cast ==
Main cast

- Cesar Montano as Titus Varona
- Christopher de Leon as Remo Doce
- Sunshine Cruz as May Vergara

Supporting cast

- Behn Cervantes as Carlos Alejo
- Patricia Javier as PO2 Katrina Aguilar
- Bon Vibar as Gen. Rodrigo Banares
- Dick Israel as SPO4 Magno
- Rommel Montano as Zaballero
- Rico J. Puno as Congressman
- Minco Fabregas as Tanchanco
- Alvin Bernales as Magno
- Jerry Mongcal as Sanchez
- Rico Miguel as Gamboa
- Jun Collao as Bomb Squad Member
- Jerry Lopez as Bomb Squad Member
- Issah Alcadra as Bryan
- Jackie Castillejos as Reporter
- Mel Kimura as Teacher
- Leychard Sicangco as Orosa
- Ace Espinosa as C-4 Dealer

== Production ==
Production of the film took over a year with Erik Matti initially at the helm. Halfway though the film, Matti dropped out to focus on another film and the project was postponed for the wedding and honeymoon of Cesar and Sunshine. When production resumed, Augusto Salvador took over the directorial duties.

== Awards ==
Year	Awards	Category	Recipient	Result	Ref.
2002	50th FAMAS Awards	Best Director	Augusto Salvador	Nominated	
