= Mananabas =

Philippine action film

- Directed by: Cesar Montano
- Written by: Cesar Montano; Senen Dimaguila
- Story by: Vic Dabao
- Produced by: Eric Cuatico
- Starring: Cesar Montano
- Cinematography: Richard Padernal
- Edited by: Augusto Salvador
- Music by: Edwin "Kiko" Ortega
- Production company: Maverick Films
- Distributed by: Maverick Films
- Release date: October 16, 2001
- Running time: 120 minutes
- Country: Philippines
- Language: Filipino

Mananabas is a 2001 Philippine action film co-written and directed by Cesar Montano, who stars as the title role.

== Cast ==
- Cesar Montano as Lt. Miguel Marasigan
- Jo Canonizado as Sabrina Wilson
- Rommel Montano as Sgt. Aragon
- Daniel Fernando as Col. Rolando Garcia
- Spanky Manikan as Gen. Tomas Roxas
- Richard Merck as Military Groom
- Sammy Lagmay as Boyet
- Bon Vibar as Gen. Fred Torre
- Jeffrey Tam as Ting
- Mandy Ochoa as Maj. Paterno
- Mike Magat as Capt. Reyes
- Nicole Hofer as Nelia Marasigan
- Mina Bernales as Village Bride
- Cris Aguilar as Dagul
- Joel Apalla as Bungo
- Jerry Lopez as Hapon
- Jess Sanchez as Kulog
- Jun Collao as Maj. Estacio
- Sammuel Ebaristo as Pangil
- Cris Vertido as Imam
- RJ Leyran as Bride's Father
- Kevin Meyer as Paul Wilson
- Obet Tadiaman as Obet
