= Kapalaran =

- Genre: Drama
- Developed by: ABS-CBN Regional Network Group
- Directed by: RD Alba
- Starring: Joel Torre; Disi Alba; Philip Anthony; Liza Val; Rae Sillana; Bernard Cardona; Angeline Aguilar; Rommel Montano; Chanda Romero; Pilar Pilapil; Luke Mejares; Gino Antonio
- Country of origin: Philippines
- Original language: Cebuano
- No. of episodes: 348

Production
- Executive producer: Ron Valdueza
- Production location: Cebu City
- Running time: 30 min/day, 5 days a week

Original release
- Network: ABS-CBN Cebu
- Release: September 2, 2002 – January 2, 2004

Kapalaran is a Filipino daytime television drama aired in the Cebuano language. It was aired by ABS-CBN Regional Network Group (now ABS-CBN Regional) which ran from September 2, 2002 to January 2, 2004 for a total of three seasons. It was re-aired on ABS-CBN Sports and Action, both ABS-CBN and TFC.

The series originally aired on September 2, 2002 every Monday to Friday at 4:30 to 5:00 pm before TV Patrol Regional on ABS-CBN Regional Network Group as a block timer by Alba Productions, but it got picked up to run of the first season on September 2, 2002 to April 16, 2003. And the second season picked up from April 21 to August 29, 2003. The third season picked up from September 1, 2003 to January 2, 2004.

== Synopsis ==
Kapalaran is based on a fictional story about two families who are against each other but are contradicted by the love of their children. The show opens with the husband of Stella Mendoza (Liza Val) getting shot. But who shot him? Stella then blames the husband of Christina Castillo (Disi Alba) because of their past differences. As they go into the court hearings, Stella's daughter Theresa (Chelsea de la Serna) falls in love with the son of Christina Castillo, Raul (Giovanni de Vera). The murder case takes a turn when the evidences points to Stella murdering her own husband. As her verdict is announced, she goes crazy, takes a gun out of the holster of a court police officer, and shoots the detective who found the evidence Cesar Arman (Joel Torre).

The good natured Christina Castillo (Disi Alba), who is a doctor, takes over Cesar's operation and saves his life. Thankful for all of Christina's help, Cesar develops feelings for Christina, and this begins a romance between them. An American, Brandon Smith (Philip Anthony) visits the Philippines only to find out that his girlfriend Theresa Mendoza is now in love with Raul Castillo. Brandon decides to leave Theresa and goes back to the U.S. However, he gets kidnapped for ransom on his way back to the U.S. by the leader of the rebels, played by Rommel Montano.

While Brandon is in the rebel camp, he plans on escaping with the fellow prisoners. He is successful, but gets lost in a remote island where he meets a native couple, immediately learning the way of a third world country. Back in the city, Christina's husband leaves her and dies in a plane crash. His body is not found, but Christina pursues in a search for the body. Considerably, a thunderstorm wrecks her boat in the ocean.

Meanwhile, Stella Mendoza escapes from prison and tries to get revenge. While being chased by the cops, she jumps into a cliff and loses her memory after hitting her head.

Brandon, Stella and Christina try to find their way back into their normal lives against the villains Fred (Gino Antonio), Vicky (Carol Go), Magda (Chanda Romero) and Cult Leader (Luke Mejares).

== Cast ==
=== Main cast ===
- Disi Alba as Christina Castillo
- Joel Torre as Cesar Arman
- Philip Anthony as Brandon Smith

=== Supporting cast ===
- Lisa Val as Stella Mendoza
- Rae Sillana as Jenny
- Luke Mejares as the Cult leader
- Rommel Montano as the Rebel leader
- Giovanni de Vera as Raul Castillo
- Bernard Cardona as Darwin
- Angeline Aguilar as Charlene
- Chanda Romero as Magda
- Pilar Pilapil
- Cesar Montano as himself
- Sunshine Cruz as herself
- Karlo Lim as Louis
- Edelyn Okano as Diane
- Randolph Libres as Danilo
- Carol Go as Vicky
- Gino Antonio as Fred Alonso
- Meriam Sanchez

=== Extended cast ===
- Lito Legaspi as Don Pedro
- Rochelle Barrameda as Isabel
- Dianne dela Fuente as Maureen
- Joji Isla as Juanito
- Miko Samson as Jeffrey
- Glaiza de Castro as Rosalie
- Alwyn Uytingco as Rene
- Rodney Shattara as Joshua
- Emman Abeleda as Henry
- Bayani Casimiro Jr. as Andy
- Nanding Josef as Mateo

== Production staff ==
- Executive Producer: Ron Valdueza
- Producer: Alba Productions
- Written by: Disi Alba, R. D. Alba, Helen Macarayan
- Directed by: R. D. Alba
