= Hesus, Rebolusyonaryo =

Philippine science fiction drama film

- Official movie poster
- Directed by: Lav Diaz
- Written by: Lav Diaz
- Produced by: Lily Y. Monteverde
- Starring: Mark Anthony Fernandez
- Cinematography: Romulo Araojo
- Edited by: Ron Dale
- Music by: The Jerks
- Production company: Regal Entertainment
- Distributed by: Regal Entertainment
- Release date: February 6, 2002
- Running time: 112 minutes
- Country: Philippines
- Language: Filipino
- Budget: ₱5 million

Hesus, Rebolusyonaryo is a 2002 Philippine science fiction drama film written and directed by Lav Diaz and starring Mark Anthony Fernandez as the title role. The film did not perform well at the box office.

The film is streaming online on YouTube.

== Plot ==
Set in 2011 when the Philippines is taken over by a military junta, Hesus Mariano (Mark Anthony) is ordered by Rebel Leader Miguel Reynante (Ronnie) to assassinate his cellmates. After a series of battles, Hesus finds himself in a coma, only to wake up in the hands of Col. Arnold Simon (Joel). Drawing inspiration from his childhood sweetheart Hilda (Donita), Hesus decides to take control of the game.

== Cast ==
- Mark Anthony Fernandez as Hesus
- Donita Rose as Hilda
- Joel Lamangan as Col. Arnold Simon
- Ronnie Lazaro as Miguel Reynante
- Pinky Amador as Lucia Sarmiento
- Ricardo Cepeda as Lt. Delfin Cordero
- Bart Guingona as Eddie Teves
- Richard Joson as Carlo Montes
- Orestes Ojeda as Col. Castor
- Marianne de la Riva as Aling Sima
- Lawrence Espinosa as Gen. Cyrus Racellos
- Tado Jimenez as Tasyo
- Dido dela Paz as Checkpoint Officer
- Diding Andres as Woman at Checkpoint
- Forsythe Cordero as Rebel Contact
- Jojo Vinzon as Mamasan
- Bernabe Cordova as Military Doctor
- Cris de Gracia as Nurse

== Production ==
Principal photography of the film lasted for 20 days. The titular character is inspired by José Rizal's characters Crisostomo and Simoun. This marks Donita Rose's comeback film after four years, her last being the 1998 film Legacy.

A symposium for the film was held at the University of the Philippines Film Center on January 24, 2001.

== Reception ==
The film performed poorly in the box office and was pulled out from theaters two days after its release. Nonetheless, it received dominantly positive reviews. Andrew Paredes of the Manila Standard praised the film for retaining the iconoclasm throughout the film. However, he criticized Diaz's constant allegiance to his own ethic for Donita's brief presence in the film. Noel Vera describes the film as dystopian type of science fiction. He praised Diaz for combining the influences of José Rizal, George Orwell and video games in the film with ideas fit for at most six films. He also cited mixed reaction regarding the story's uneven flow; gunfire scenes patterned after Counterstrike inserted between extended meditative stillness.
