= Impostora =

2007 Philippine television drama series

- Title card
- Also known as: The Impostor
- Genre: Drama
- Created by: R.J. Nuevas
- Based on: Sa Isang Sulok ng mga Pangarap (1993) by Joel Lamangan
- Written by: Suzette Doctolero; Denoy Punio-Navarro; Dode Cruz; Tina Samson-Velasco; Vinuel Ello
- Directed by: Maryo J. de los Reyes
- Starring: Sunshine Dizon; Iza Calzado
- Theme music composer: Tata Betita
- Opening theme: "Mapagkunwari" by Faith Cuneta
- Country of origin: Philippines
- Original language: Tagalog
- No. of episodes: 80 (list of episodes)

Production
- Executive producer: Winnie Hollis-Reyes
- Camera setup: Multiple-camera setup
- Running time: 19–32 minutes
- Production company: GMA Entertainment TV

Original release
- Network: GMA Network
- Release: June 4 – September 21, 2007

Related
- Impostora (2017)

Impostora (transl. impostor / international title: The Impostor) is a 2007 Philippine television drama series broadcast by GMA Network. Directed by Maryo J. de los Reyes, it stars Sunshine Dizon and Iza Calzado. The series is loosely based on a 1993 Philippine film Sa Isang Sulok ng mga Pangarap (transl. A Corner of Dreams). It premiered on June 4, 2007 on the network's Telebabad line up. The series concluded on September 21, 2007, with a total of 80 episodes.

The series is streaming online on YouTube.

== Premise ==
Sara and Lara are conjoined twins when they were young. Their parents agree to have them separated at the age of eight. After their separation, misfortunes occur leaving their mother to put them up for adoption. They will eventually meet again when they get older.

== Cast and characters ==
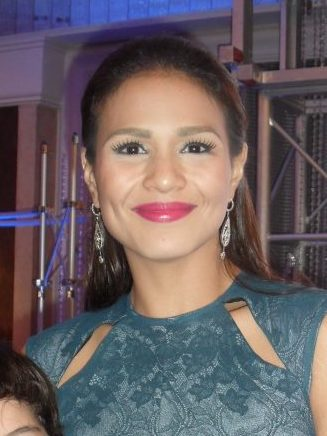
Iza Calzado portrays Lara Carreon

Lead cast

- Sunshine Dizon as Sara Carreon-Cayetano / Vanessa "Nessa" Carreon-Cayetano
- Iza Calzado as Lara Carreon / Sara Carreon

Supporting cast

- Mark Anthony Fernandez as Nicolas Cayetano
- Alfred Vargas as Carlos Pambide
- Luis Alandy as Leandro Meneses
- Chanda Romero as Anatella Cayetano
- Jean Garcia as Bettina "Betty" Carreon
- Mart Escudero as Santiago "Yago" Cayetano
- Charee Pineda as Trish
- Jennica Garcia as Karen Manansala

Guest cast

- Charice Hermoso as younger Sara
- Charlotte Hermoso as younger Lara
- Zamierre Benevice as younger Vanessa
- Romnick Sarmenta as Henry Carreon
- Gary Estrada as Delfin Carreon
- Gelli de Belen as Adelle Carreon
- Jenny Miller as Fritzie
- Anton Bernardo as Ramil
- Sam Bumatay as Kokay
- EJ Jallorina as Benjo
- Ana Capri as Saling
- Maybeline Dela Cruz as Doray
- Dexter Doria as Dorina
- Ace Espinosa as Tata Oyong
- Flora Gazer as Petra
- Ella Guevara as Kathleen C. Cayetano
- Anna Larrucea as Cora
- Jan Marini as Gemma
- Joanne Quintas as Sofia
- Jacob Rica as Patrick C. Cayetano
- Vaness del Moral as Dindy
- Lem Pelayo as Billy
- Jardson Librando as younger Leandro
- John Regala as Mando
- Ana Roces as Alexis Alvarado
- Vince Saldaña as Tristan
- Shermaine Santiago as Carla
- Deborah Sun as Francisca "Kikay" Manansala
- Robert Villar as Raul
- Chachiee Santos as Tina

== Production ==
Principal photography commenced on April 23, 2007.

== Accolades ==
Accolades received by Impostora
Year	Award	Category	Recipient	Result	Ref.
2008	22nd PMPC Star Awards for Television	Best Drama Actor	Mark Anthony Fernandez	Nominated	
2008	22nd PMPC Star Awards for Television	Best Drama Actress	Sunshine Dizon	Nominated	
2008	22nd PMPC Star Awards for Television	Best Primetime Drama Series	Impostora	Nominated	
