= The Blood Brothers (2024 film) =

2024 Philippine thriller film

- Theatrical release poster
- Directed by: Cesar Montano
- Screenplay by: Roy C. Iglesias
- Based on: The Blood Brothers by Dr. Ronald Adamat
- Produced by: Dr. Ronald Adamat
- Starring: Cesar Montano; Victor Neri; Allan Paule; Dr. Ronald Adamat
- Cinematography: Jay Ramirez
- Edited by: Rico Testa
- Music by: Dr. Ronald Adamat
- Production companies: Innovative Digital Entertainment Arts; Empowerment Film Production Inc.
- Release date: May 8, 2024
- Running time: 94 minutes
- Country: Philippines
- Language: Filipino

The Blood Brothers is a 2024 Philippine biographical thriller film directed by Cesar Montano and written by Roy C. Iglesias. Based on the book of the same name by Ronald Adamat, it stars Victor Neri, Allan Paule, Cesar Montano and Dr. Ronald Adamat. It was produced by Innovative Digital Entertainment Arts and Empowerment Film Production and released on May 8, 2024.

== Plot ==
In the remote highlands of Mindanao, two brothers grow up deeply rooted in their indigenous community's customs and traditions. The elder brother (Cesar Montano), is a steadfast guardian of their ancestral heritage, embracing the ways of their forebears with unwavering devotion. His life is intertwined with the community's rituals, oral histories, and spiritual beliefs, which he strives to preserve amidst the encroaching influences of the modern world.

The younger brother (Dr. Ronald Adamat), exhibits a keen intellect and an insatiable curiosity about the world beyond their village. Recognizing his potential, community elders and external benefactors facilitate his journey to pursue formal education in the lowlands. Immersed in a new environment, he encounters diverse perspectives, scientific reasoning, and a broader understanding of Philippine history and society. This journey profoundly reshapes his worldview, leading him to question certain traditional practices and advocate for reforms that he believes could benefit their community.

Upon returning to his village, the younger brother's transformed outlook clashes with the elder's steadfast adherence to tradition. Their once unbreakable bond is tested as debates over cultural preservation versus modernization intensify. The community becomes divided, with some members embracing the younger brother's vision for progress, while others fear the erosion of their cultural identity.

As tensions escalate, external forces exploit the rift between the brothers, threatening the community's unity and way of life. The brothers confront the consequences of their choices, ultimately seeking a path toward reconciliation that honors their shared heritage while embracing the possibilities of the future.

== Cast ==
- Cesar Montano
- Allan Paule
- Victor Neri
- Dr. Ronald Adamat
- Epy Quizon
- Lou Veloso
- Sue Prado
- Elora Espanio
- Archie Adamos
- Rolando Inocencio
- Jc Parker
- Raul Morit
- Orlando Sol
- Jocelyn Palao
- Benzon Dalina

== Production ==
In June 2022, Cesar Montano promoted his two new films Maid in Malacañang and The Blood Brothers, he also added that they already finish to shoot the film and he wants it to be part of 2022 Metro Manila Film Festival.

== Release ==
The film was released on May 8 to May 16, 2024, and it only available on SM Cinemas.
