= Mark Anthony Fernandez =

Filipino actor (born 1979)

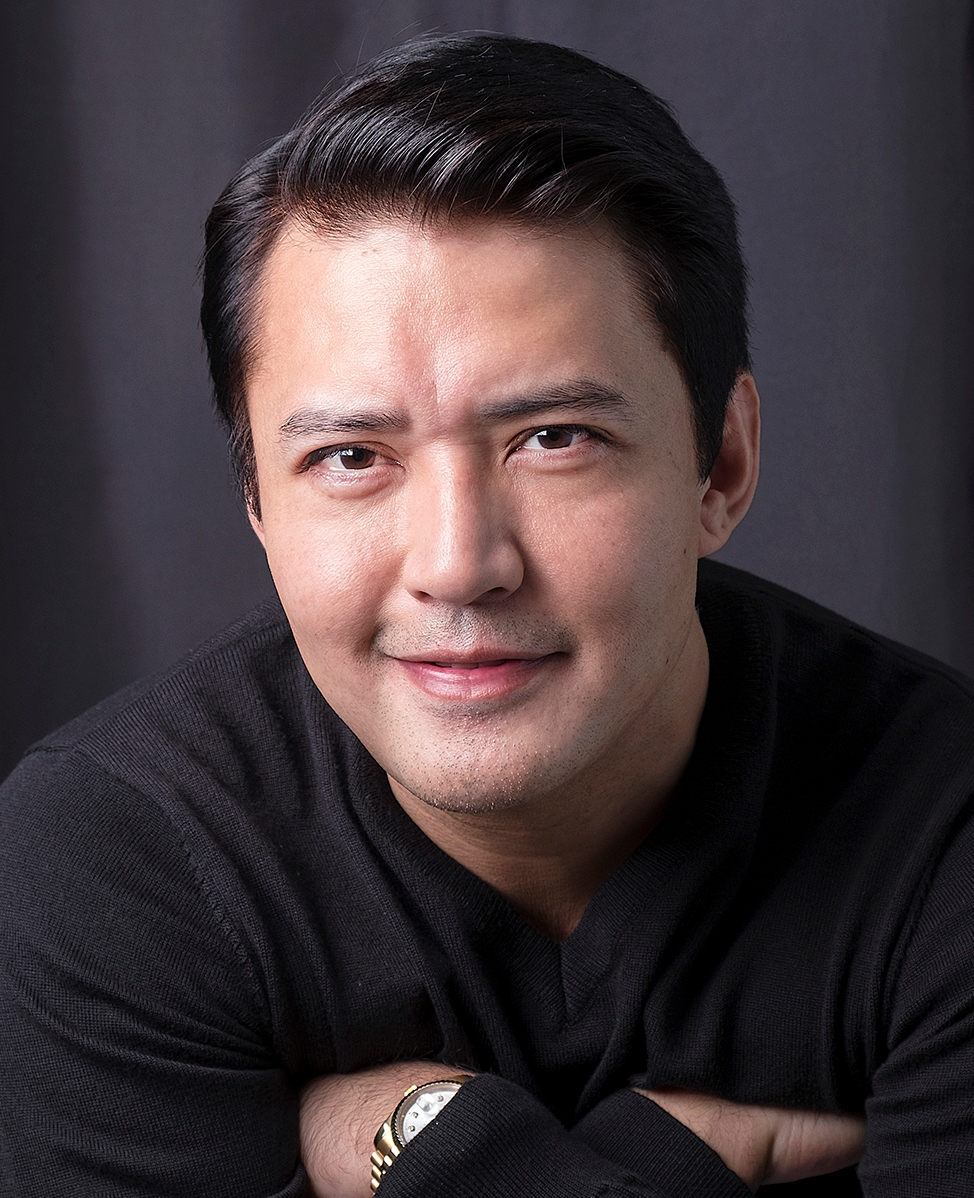
- Fernandez in 2018
- Born: Mark Anthony Lacsamana Fernandez; January 18, 1979 (age 47); Manila, Philippines
- Occupations: Actor; model
- Years active: 1991–present
- Children: 2 (including Grae)
- Parents: Rudy Fernandez (father); Alma Moreno (mother)
- Relatives: Padilla-Fernandez Family
- Family: Renz Fernandez (half-brother); Vandolph Quizon (half-brother); Winwyn Marquez (half-sister); Gregorio Fernandez (grandfather); Lorna Tolentino (stepmother)

Mark Anthony Lacsamana Fernandez (born January 18, 1979) is a Filipino actor. He is the son of actor Rudy Fernandez and actress-politician Alma Moreno.

== Career ==
Fernandez first rose to prominence when he was once a former member of one of the famous showbiz teen group, "Gwapings" alongside Jomari Yllana, Eric Fructuoso, and later with Jao Mapa.

His breakout roles in the movies include Pare Ko, Mangarap Ka and Matimbang Pa sa Dugo which featured him as a lead star. In 1996, he received Best Actor and Best Supporting Actor nominations for the 3 aforementioned movies he did. However, the year 1998 started a downward spiral in Fernandez's career and personal life following an assault case that was filed against him by an American socialite and the break-up with his then-girlfriend Claudine Barretto. His home studio Regal Films attempted to launch him as an action star in the movies Sonny Segovia: Lumakad Ka Sa Apoy and Walang Katumbas Ang Dugo but both movies flopped at the box-office.

After a two-year hiatus from a drug rehabilitation which follows his acquittal in the assault case, Fernandez returned in the movie scene via Biyaheng Langit and Dos Ekis opposite sexy actresses Joyce Jimenez and Rica Peralejo, respectively. He also made a TV comeback via GMA drama series Ikaw Lang ang Mamahalin opposite Angelika dela Cruz.

In 2003, he disappeared once again from the industry and underwent rehabilitation for drug dependence for the second time. In 2005, he was released from rehab and made his comeback in show business. After his release from rehab, he stated, "I hope the moviegoers will welcome me back. Now, I realize more than ever that I'm made for showbiz and I'll always be in showbiz."

Fernandez has been one of GMA Network's leading actors with his critically acclaimed performances on TV series such as Impostora (2007), Kamandag (2007–08), Ako si Kim Samsoon (2008), Luna Mystika (2008–09), All About Eve (2009) and Munting Heredera. He also portrayed Manny Pacquiao in Magpakailanman in 2003 before his second drug rehab.

His role as Nicolas Cayetano in the drama series Impostora, became his most notable role in TV and he said drama also relaunched his career making him one of the sought-after leading men in GMA-7 and because of the fruitful projects given to him by GMA, he decided to sign an exclusive contract with the network that rebuilt his career. He was paired off with Sunshine Dizon (Impostora), Heart Evangelista (Luna Mystika), Iza Calzado (All About Eve), Marian Rivera (Darna) and Regine Velasquez (Ako si Kim Samsoon and recently in Diva, 2010).

Fernandez also hosted a kids documentary reality show Kap's Amazing Stories Kids Edition last April 2010 on GMA Network.

In January 2018, Fernandez returned to showbiz after legal issues. He signed a contract with Viva Artist Agency. After 12 years, he returned to ABS-CBN via FPJ's Ang Probinsyano.

== Personal life ==
Fernandez married Melissa Garcia in 2006 but have since separated in 2014. They have a son named Grae Cameron. He is also the nephew of action star and senator Robin Padilla; Mark's father Rudy Fernandez is Robin's cousin.

On 3 October 2016, Fernandez was arrested for marijuana possession after attempting to elude a police checkpoint in Angeles, Pampanga. He has stated he smokes marijuana "to prevent cancer". After a year, on 23 December 2017, Fernandez had been released from jail due to dismissal of drug case against him.

== Filmography ==
=== Film ===
Year	Title	Role	Notes	Ref.
1991	Onyong Majikero			
1992	Gwapings: The First Adventure	Jeff		
1992	Shotgun Banjo			
1993	Gwapings Dos			
1994	Binibini ng Aking Panaginip			
1994	Sobrang Talaga... Over!!			
1995	Matimbang Pa sa Dugo			
1995	Pare Ko	Francis		
1995	Eskapo	Eugenio "Gabby" Lopez III		
1995	Araw-araw, Gabi-gabi			
1995	Mangarap Ka	Nonoy		
1996	Istokwa			
1996	Kabilin-bilinan ng Lola ('Wag Uminom ng Serbesa)	Devin		
1997	Kulayan Natin ang Bukas			
1997	Ako Ba ang Nasa Puso Mo			
1998	Sonny Segovia: Lumakad Ka sa Apoy			
1998	Walang Katumbas ang Dugo			
2000	Biyaheng Langit	Danny		
2001	Dos Ekis	Benito Quebrar		
2002	Hesus Rebolusyonaryo	Hesus Mariano		
2003	You and Me Against the World	Arnold Torrevilla		
2003	Sa Piling ng Mga Belyas			
2005	Shake, Rattle & Roll 2k5	Rene	"Lihim ng San Joaquin" segment	
2006	Batas Militar	Lt. Eric Dela Cruz		
2009	Shake, Rattle & Roll XI	Father Ronnie	"Diablo" segment	
2010	Rosario			
2010	Babang Luksa			
2013	Boy Golden: Shoot to Kill			
2015	The Last Pinoy Action King			
2015	Manila's Finest	Ismael Lorenzo		
2016	Ma' Rosa	Castor		
2019	Miracle in Cell No. 7	Pancho		
2021	Barumbadings	Jopay		
2021	House Tour	Markus Palma		
2021	Deception	Jericho / Ethan		
2022	Doblado	Mr. L		
2022	Scorpio Nights 3	Drake		
2024	Pasahero	Tom		

=== Television ===
Year	Title	Role
1991–1998	Palibhasa Lalake	Mark
1994–1995	Tropang Trumpo	Himself
1995–2001; 2026–present	ASAP	Himself/Performer
2001–2002	Ikaw Lang ang Mamahalin	Gabriel / Lorenzo
2003	Magpakailanman: The Manny Pacquiao Story	Manny Pacquiao
2005	Ang Mahiwagang Baul	Various
2005	Kakabakaba	Various
2005	Maynila	Various
2006	Komiks: Da Adventures of Pedro Penduko	Lito
2006–2007	Super Inggo	Kanor
2007	Mga Kuwento ni Lola Basyang	Sultan Saif
2007	Impostora	Nicolas Cayetano
2007–2008	Kamandag	Lucero Serrano / Talim
2008	Ako si Kim Samsoon	Cyrus Ruiz
2008	Dear Friend	Various
2008–2009	Luna Mystika	Dexter Samaniego
2009	All About Eve	Kenneth Villareal
2009	Quickfire: 10 Minute Kitchen Wonders	Himself
2009–2010	Mars Ravelo's Darna	Eduardo Morgan / Black Rider
2010	Kap's Amazing Stories: Kids Edition	Guest Host
2010	Diva	Gary / Ate Kuh
2010	Claudine	Anton
2010	Love Bug Presents: Say I Do	Alvin
2010–2011	Little Star	Dave De Leon
2010	Jillian: Namamasko Po	Alvin
2011	I Heart You, Pare!	Chito Salazar
2011–2012	Munting Heredera	Jacob Montereal
2012	Makapiling Kang Muli	Luisito "Louie" Valencia
2013	Bukod Kang Pinagpala	Leandro Alcuar
2013	Prinsesa ng Buhay Ko	Fireman Benedict Bautista
2013	Genesis	Joel
2014	Rhodora X	Nico Ledesma
2015	Let the Love Begin	Jose Marie "Jom" Quinto
2016	Wish I May	Clark Gomez
2016	Magpakailanman: Crime of Passion	Eric
2018–2019	FPJ's Ang Probinsyano	Brandon Cabrera†
2018	Ipaglaban Mo: Dakip	Eddie Angeles
2019	Ipaglaban Mo: Reputasyon	Baste
2024–2025	Lumuhod Ka Sa Lupa	Brando Malvar
2025–2026	Totoy Bato	Stanley Roco
2025	Seducing Drake Palma	Ishmael "Tito Steve" Palma

== Awards and nominations ==
Year	Award-giving body	Category	Nominated work	Result	Source
2008	22nd PMPC Star Awards for TV	Best Drama Actor	Impostora	Nominated	
