= Cesar Montano =

Filipino actor, film producer and film director (born 1962)

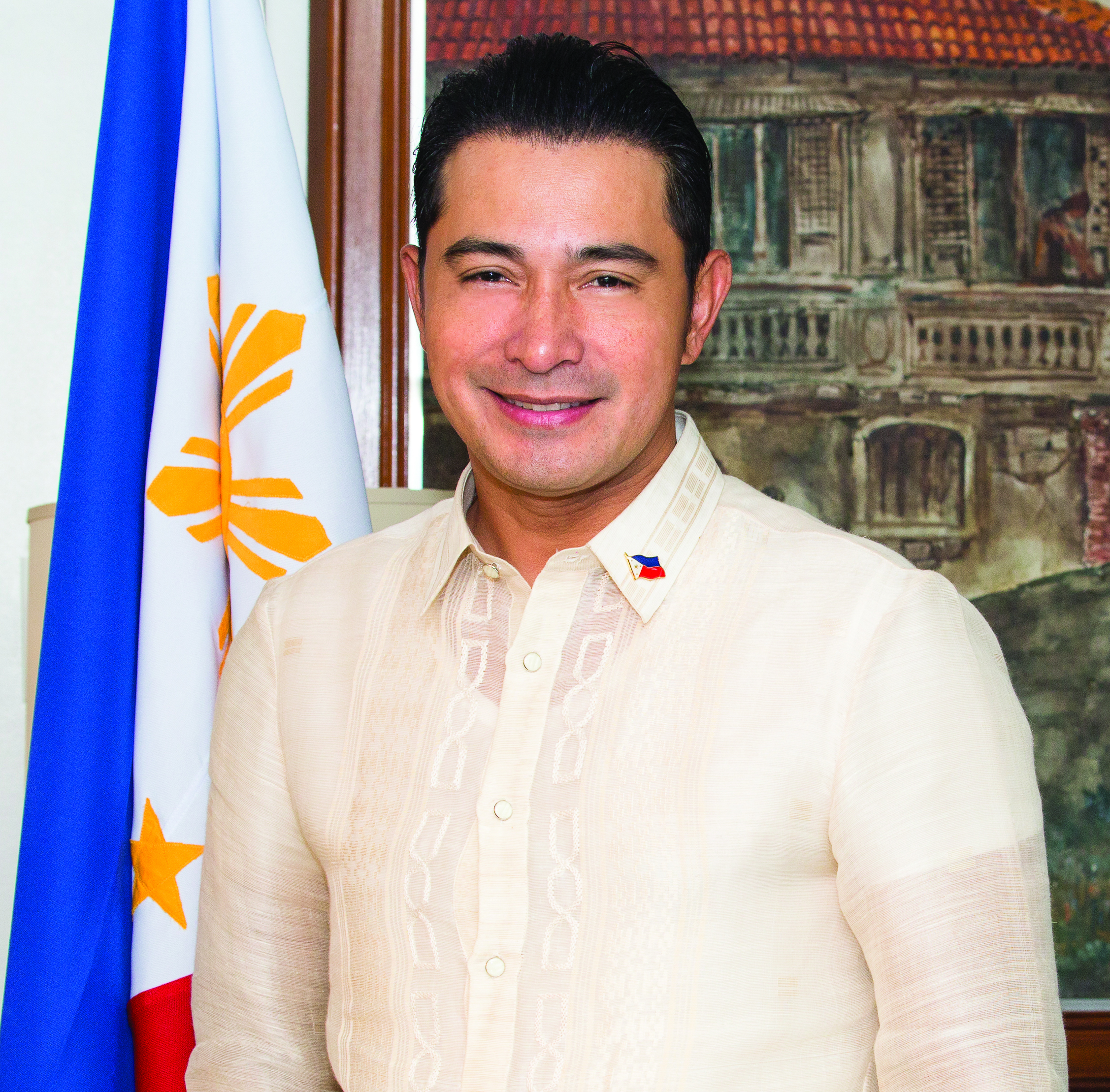
- Montano in 2017

Chief Operating Officer of the Tourism Promotions Board
- In office December 6, 2016 – May 21, 2018
- President: Rodrigo Duterte

Personal details
- Born: Cesar Demontaño Manhilot; August 1, 1962 (age 64) Santa Ana, Manila, Philippines
- Party: Independent (2017–present)
- Other political affiliations: Liberal (2009–2017); Lakas–Kampi (until 2009)
- Spouses: Marilyn Polinga (m. 1986; died 1992); Sunshine Cruz (m. 2000; ann. 2018)
- Children: 10 (including Diego)
- Education: Lyceum of the Philippines; Philippine Public Safety College
- Occupation: Actor; film producer; film director

Cesar Demontaño Manhilot (Tagalog: [ˈsɛsaɾ mɔnˈtɐnɔ]; born August 1, 1962) is a Filipino actor, producer, and film director.

Montano started in show business as a commercial model. He portrayed roles in numerous B movies, before playing major roles in several action films, along with a successful television career, with his most notable television role being in the sitcom Kaya ni Mister, Kaya ni Misis. One of his best-known roles is his portrayal of the titular patriot José Rizal in the film José Rizal (1998). He starred in the war film The Great Raid (2005), his first Hollywood film.

Montano has won numerous acting awards in Panaghoy sa Suba ("The Call of the River"), José Rizal, Muro Ami ("Reef Hunters") and Bagong Buwan ("New Moon").

Aside from acting, Montano also embarked on a singing career, with the release of his music album Subok lang or Just try in 2000. He has also ventured into film production as well as directing, with Panaghoy sa Suba as his directorial film debut.

In May 2007, he unsuccessfully ran for Senate under the coalition TEAM Unity (TU). GMA News reported that he lost about P40 million worth of endorsement for running in public office. Montano also lost the 2010 Gubernatorial race in his home province of Bohol.

On July 13, 2010, Montano officially became a contract artist of GMA Network after signing a two-year exclusive contract with the said network. In 2012, he left GMA Network for TV5's Artista Academy.

In 2016, Montano ran as the 2nd nominee of Aangat Tayo party-list in the 2016 national elections, but subsequently lost. In the same year, he was appointed by Tourism Secretary Wanda Corazon Teo as the Chief Operation Officer of the Tourism Promotions Board.

== Biography and career ==
Montano, known by his nickname Buboy, was born and raised in Santa Ana, Manila, Philippines. His paternal side traces its roots to the Manhilots of Baclayon, a town in Bohol.

=== Early work ===
Montano became interested in acting while studying in college. He acted in stage productions at the University of the Philippines and joined acting workshops in between. Among his notable plays is Esteromenggoles. He also worked as a stuntman early in his career.

He auditioned for Ishmael Bernal's Student Body under Regal Films, in which he became among the top 3 leading men. Unfortunately, the project didn't push through. He was later discovered by Robbie Tan, who made him a talent of the now-defunct Seiko Films. He initially bagged supporting roles in action films and leading men roles in drama films. In 1990, he starred in his first two movies Kasalanan ang Buhayin Ka and Machete. After leaving Seiko in mid-1992, he starred in several films under Viva Films and its subsidiary Neo Films.

Montano is known for his collaboration with the late Toto Natividad, who directed his movies Leonardo Delos Reyes: Alyas Waway (1993), Utol (1996), Biláng na ang Araw mo (1996), Pusakal (1997), Sanggano (1997), Kasangga Kahit Kelan (1998), Warfreak (1998), and Type Kita Walang Kokontra (1999).

He played national hero José Rizal in the historical biopic José Rizal in 1998. In 1999 film Muro Ami, he played Fredo, the boss of child laborers in the illegal fishing industry. The film won thirteen awards at the 1999 Metro Manila Film Festival.

=== Directing ===
Montano's early directions were an episode of Mikee in 1995, in which he starred in, and the 1998 film Warfreak, in which he co-directed with Natividad and starred as the titular character. In 1999, Montano marked his directorial debut with Bullet, in which he co-wrote and starred as the titular character, an autistic person with a special skill in marksmanship. The same goes for the 2001 film Mananabas, where he stars as the leader of a lost command.

Montano produced, directed and starred in the 2004 film Panaghoy sa Suba, which was his entry to the 2004 Metro Manila Film Festival. It is set during World War II, and the story takes place mostly along the Loboc River in Bohol. It was filmed mostly in the Visayan language with an almost exclusively Visayan cast. It was given an "A" rating by the Cinema Evaluation Board or CEB of the Film Development Council of the Philippines, which described the film as "a poetic, sometimes even magical, current of silent struggle and survival".

Panaghoy sa Suba won multiple awards. It collected Second Best Picture (to Mano Po III: My Love), Best Director, Best Supporting Actress, Best Screenplay, Best Cinematography, Best Musical Score and the Gatpuno Villegas Cultural Award at the Metro Manila Film Festival, 2004; and Best Actor, Best Supporting Actress at Gawad Suri Awards, Manila, 2005. Aside from garnering 16 awards and 11 nominations including 5 from, it was also given an endorsement by the UNESCO. It was named Best Picture at the International Festival of Independent Films held in Brussels, Belgium. Montano was also chosen Best Director. In addition, Montano also won Best Actor in Panaghoy sa Suba in the Golden Screen Awards. Panaghoy sa Suba was invited as an exhibition in the Tous les cinémas du Monde (Movies of the World) at the Cannes Film Festival in 2005. It has also been invited for exhibition in other international film festivals in Berlin, Toronto, Tokyo, Korea and in the Czech Republic's Karlo Vary Film Festival.

=== Hollywood ===
In 2002, American film director and screenwriter John Dahl cast Montano in The Great Raid after taking notice of Montano's performance in the movie Muro Ami as well as an extensive open call audition and series of callbacks in Manila. He played Juan Pajota in the Miramax Film set in Cabanatuan, Nueva Ecija, Philippines, in 1945 during World War II. The film was shot mostly in Australia and partly in China.

Montano was cast in another U.S. film, Another Deep Breath, scheduled to start shooting in the San Francisco Bay Area in March 2005. Funding was never secured so the production never started shooting.

=== Music career ===
From 1981 to 1982, Montano was a regular performer at Hotel Mirador.

On January 1, 2000, Montano released his first music solo album entitled "Subok Lang" (Just Try) under Star Records. On nine of the album's ten songs he is accompanied only by an acoustic guitar. He sings a duet on the second version "Kailan Ko Lang Sinabi" (When I Just Told You) with his wife, Sunshine Cruz, who is also a Filipino actress and recording artist. Subok lang went on to become Platinum record.

=== Political career ===
Montano ran for a senate position under Lakas in the 2007 elections and lost. On May 19, 2009, he was appointed by then-president Gloria Macapagal Arroyo as her Presidential Special Envoy for Film and Digital Cinema, a newly created position accorded ambassador rank and given diplomatic status by the Department of Foreign Affairs. He then again attempted to be involved in politics on October 13, 2009, when he filed his candidacy for governor in his home province Bohol under Liberal Party. He lost the 2010 local election for the governor position against incumbent representative-turned-governor Edgar Chatto.

== Personal life ==
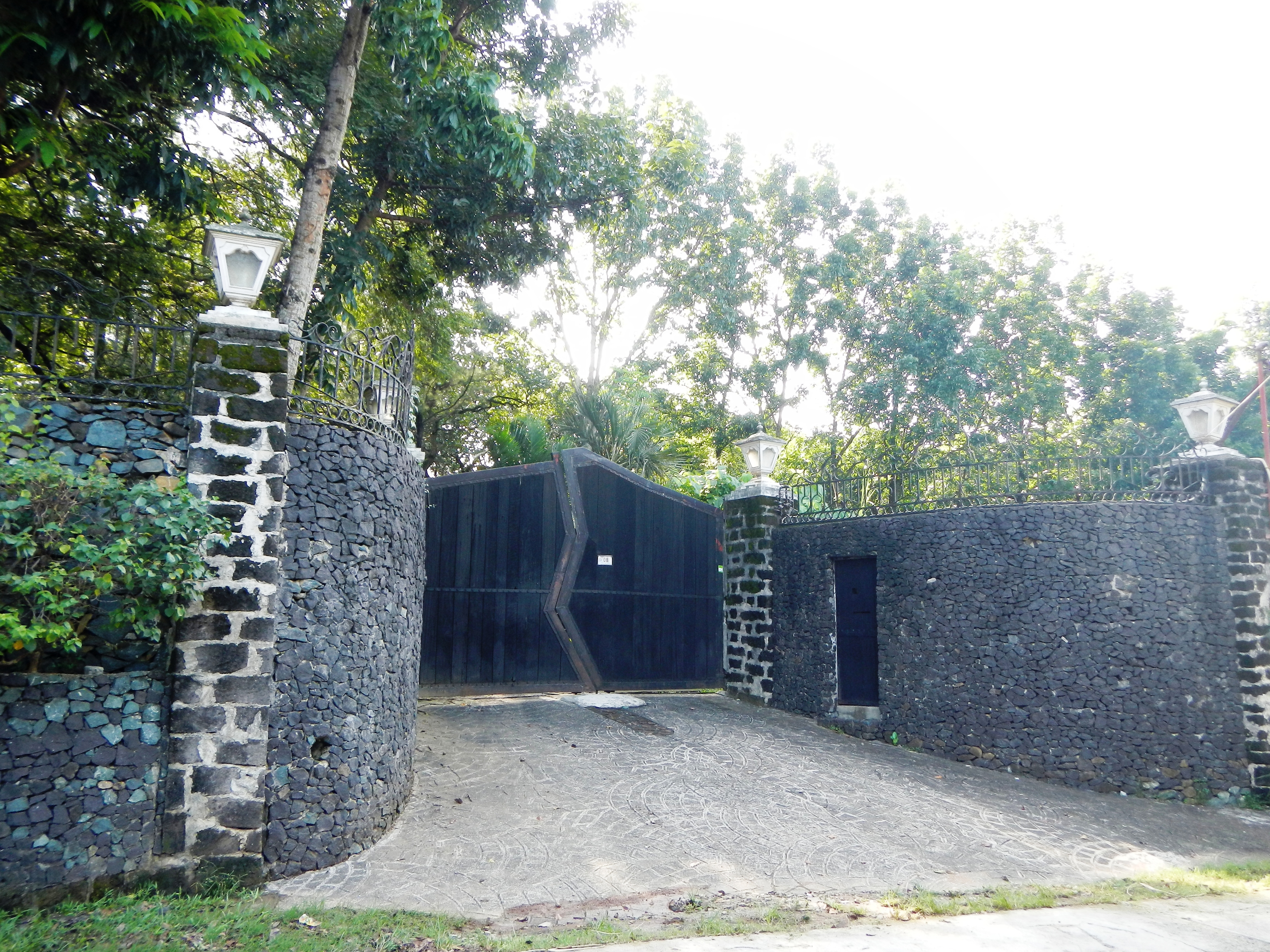
Façade of Cesar Montano and wife Sunshine Cruz' rest house in Pandi, Bulacan

Montano is fluent in both Tagalog and Cebuano, and speaks his ancestral Boholano dialect. He is the fifth of seven children born to a lawyer father and mother that belonged to the Seventh-day Adventist Church. Montano describes his father as a strict disciplinarian, and his mother imposing her religion's prohibitions against pork and movies. He attended Santa Ana Elementary School and Mariano Marcos Memorial High School, both in Santa Ana, Manila. He completed his bachelor's degree in Mass Communication at Lyceum of the Philippines University in Intramuros, Manila in 2009. He later obtained his master's degree in Public Safety Administration at Philippine Public Safety College in 2023.

Montano was first married to Marilyn Polinga, a fellow Boholano he met at a local Seventh-day Adventist church. Montano then worshipped at the Bread of Life Ministries International evangelical church in Quezon City, before becoming a congregant at Christ's Commission Fellowship in Mandaluyong together with his second wife, Sunshine Cruz, and his children. Polinga, with whom he has two children, died in 1993. Their second child, Christian Angelo Manhilot, died at the age of 23 on March 26, 2010, from a self-inflicted gunshot wound to the head at their house in Quezon City.

His son with actress Teresa Loyzaga, Carlos Diego Loyzaga, lived with his mother in Australia, and has returned to the Philippines as an exclusive contract actor with ABS-CBN.

Montano married Sunshine Cruz on September 14, 2000, in a Christian wedding. They have three daughters, Angelina Isabelle, Samantha Angeline and Angel Francheska. He filed for annulment of marriage with Cruz, which was finally granted on September 18, 2018. Aside from his farm in Pandi, Bulacan, Montano also owns an Italian restaurant located in Quezon City.

Montano also had a relationship with Miss Philippines Earth 2009 Sandra Seifert. The two had a son named Corinth Ian or Coco. He's currently in a relationship with his domestic partner Socorro "Kath" Angeles, to whom he had 3 children, Liam, Samuel and Kristen.

As of June 2023, Montano has three grandchildren: two from his eldest daughter Angela and one from son Diego.

Cesar Montano has rejoined the Seventh-day Adventist Church.

== Filmography ==
=== Film ===
Year	Title	Role
1982	Ang Tapang Para sa Lahat!	Young Alex
1982	Relasyon	
1983	Broken Marriage	Ralph Palomeno
1984	Working Girls	Office Bully
1984	Ang Padrino	Noring
1985	Hinugot sa Langit	Cesar
1988	Puso sa Puso	Noel
1989	Lihim ng Golden Buddha	
1989	Mahirap ang Magmahal	
1989	Kokak	Ralph Palomeno
1989	Bihagin ang Dalagang Ito	Hector
1989	Ang Bukas Ay Akin	Predo
1990	Sagot ng Puso	Efren
1990	"Ako ang Batas" -Gen. Tomas Karingal	Lt. Reyes
1990	Kasalanan ang Buhayin Ka	Jimmy
1990	Machete: Istatwang Buhay	Machete
1990	Hindi Laruan ang Puso	Mark
1991	Mainit, Masarap ... Parang Kaning Isusubo	
1991	Ganito Ba ang Umibig?	Armand
1991	Kapag Nag-abot ang Langit at Lupa	Hamil
1992	Hiram Na Mukha	Mendez
1992	Sumayaw Ka Salome	Leo
1992	Eh, Kasi Bata	Glen
1993	Ikaw Lang	Alfred
1993	Leonardo delos Reyes: Alyas Waway	Leonardo "Waway" delos Reyes
1993	Markadong Hudas	Daniel Braganza
1994	The Cecilia Masagca Story: Antipolo Massacre (Jesus Save Us!)	Winifredo Masagca
1994	Talahib at Rosas	Jacob Villapando
1995	Manalo, Matalo, Mahal Kita	Jack
1995	Asero	Victor Asero
1995	Silakbo	Atty. Andy Gil
1995	The Lilian Velez Story	Narding Anzures
1995	Annabelle Huggins Story/Ruben Ablaza Tragedy - Mea Culpa	Ruben Ablaza
1996	Utol	Jaime Cordero
1996	Kung Kaya Mo, Kaya Ko Rin	Mac
1996	Bilang Na ang Araw Mo	Raphael Fernandez
1997	Batas Ko ay Bala	Guiller
1997	Pusakal	King Rustia
1997	Kadre	Ruben Torres
1997	Wala Nang Iibigin Pa	Daniel
1997	Sanggano	Diego
1998	Kasangga Kahit Kailan	Bardo Santa Mesa/Benjie Borres
1998	Alyas Boy Tigas: Ang Probinsyanong Wais	Cesar
1998	Warfreak: Walang Sinasanto, Walang Pinapatawad	Jack Llamas
1998	José Rizal	José Rizal
1999	Type Kita, Walang Kokontra	Victor
1999	Bullet	Bullet
1999	Muro Ami	Fredo
2000	Pedro Penduko II: The Return of Comeback	Fredo
2001	Hostage	Jimmy Pizarro
2001	Baliktaran: Si Ace at si Angelique	
2001	Alas-Dose	Titus Varona
2001	Mananabas: Mga Ligaw Na Talahib (aka The Reaper)	
2001	Bagong Buwan (aka New Moon)	Dr. Ahmad Ibn Ismael
2002	Lakas Sambayanan (People Power)	
2003	Chavit	Chavit Singson
2004	Panaghoy sa Suba (The Call of the River)	Duroy
2005	The Great Raid	Guerilla Leader Captain Juan Pajota
2005	Balangiga Massacre	
2005	Dagohoy	Dagohoy/Jeremiah Roxas
2006	Ang Pagbabalik ng Bituin: A Mega Celebration	Himself
2006	Batang Maynila	
2006	The Rootcutter	
2006	Ligalig	
2008	Urduja	Limhang
2012	Hitman	Ben
2012	Biktima	Mark de la Cruz
2012	El Presidente	Andres Bonifacio
2013	Alfredo S. Lim (The Untold Story)	Alfredo S. Lim
2015	Kid Kulafu	Sardo
2015	Nilalang	Tony
2017	Ang Panday	Police C/Insp. Erwin Rivera
2022	Maid in Malacañang	Ferdinand Marcos Sr.
2023	Martyr or Murderer	Ferdinand Marcos Sr.
2023	Selda Tres	
2024	The Blood Brothers	

=== Television ===
Year	Title	Role
1988	Regal Shocker: Karunungang Itim	Maestro Drakul
1988	Agos	
1988	Regal Shocker: Nang Umibig ang Impakto	Ruben
1988	Regal Shocker: Pugot na Maestro	Mike
1988	Regal Shocker: Diyosa ng Lagim	Arthur
1989	Regal Shocker: Kilabot	Eddie
1989	Regal Shocker: Ibong Itim	Vaughn
1989	Goin' Bananas	Himself - guest
1990	The Maricel Drama Special Year II: Mga Anino sa Kagubatan	Lito
1993	Star Drama Presents: Nora - Serye	Emil
1994	Maalaala Mo Kaya: Selyo	Julio
1994	Star Drama Presents: Lorna	
1994	Star Drama Presents: Carmina - Front Page	P/Lt. Bauzon
1995	Ang Akusado (TV Movie)	
1995	Maalaala Mo Kaya: Batis	
1996	Oki Doki Doc	Cesar (guest)
1997–2001	Kaya ni Mister, Kaya ni Misis	Buboy Magtanggol
1999	Pwedeng Pwede	Buboy (guest)
2001	Larawan	
2002	Kapalaran	Himself - TV series
2002–2005	Bida si Mister, Bida si Misis	Buboy Magtanggol
2007	Asian Treasures	Pancho Pistolero
2008	Pinoy Mano-Mano: The Celebrity Boxing Challenge	Himself - Host
2008	Palos	Fabio Cassimir / Palos
2008–2010	The Singing Bee	Himself - Host
2009	Wowowee	Himself - Guest Co-host
2010	Hole in the Wall	Himself - Guest Host
2010	Ilumina	Romano Sebastian
2010	Puso ng Pasko: Artista Challenge	Himself - Challenger
2011	Andres de Saya	Andres Taguyod
2012	Artista Academy	Himself - Host
2012	Gandang Gabi, Vice!	Himself - Guest
2013	Never Say Goodbye	Javier Montecastro
2013	Akin Pa Rin ang Bukas	Atty. Conrad Alperos
2014	The Ryzza Mae Show	Himself - Guest
2014	ASOP Music Festival	Himself - Composer
2016	Bakit Manipis ang Ulap?	Leo Cabrera
2016	FPJ's Ang Probinsyano	PS/Insp. Hector Mercurio
2023	Minsan pa Nating Hagkan ang Nakaraan	Cenon Aurelio

== Discography ==
Album information
Subok Lang
- Released: January 1, 2000 (Philippines)
- Label: Star Records
- Chart positions:
- PARI certification: Platinum
- P.I. Sales:
- Worldwide sales:
- Songs (year 2000):
  - "Sana Dumating Ka Na" ("I Hope You Come Soon")
  - "Sa Pagpatak ng Ulan" ("When the Rain Drops")
  - "Kailan Ko Lang Sinabi" ("When I Just Told You")
  - "All My Life"
  - "Ikaw Lang" ("Only You")
  - "Subok Lang" ("Just Try")
  - "Lumayo Ka Man Sa Akin" ("Even If You Leave Me")
  - "Magic of Love"
  - "Kailan Ko Lang Sinabi" ("When I Just Told You")
  - "Ikaw Pa Rin" ("Still You")

== Awards ==
Year	Award Given Body	Category	Work	Result
1989	Metro Manila Film Festival	Best Supporting Actor	Ang Bukas Ay Akin	Won
1998	Metro Manila Film Festival	Best Actor	Jose Rizal	Won
2001	Metro Manila Film Festival	Best Actor	Bagong Buwan	Won
2004	Metro Manila Film Festival	Best Director	Panaghoy sa Suba	Won
2004	Film Academy of the Philippines Awards (FAP)	Best Director	Panaghoy sa Suba	Won
2004	Gawad Urian Awards	Best Actor	Panaghoy sa Suba	Won
2004	Gawad Urian Awards	Best Director	Panaghoy sa Suba	Won
2004	Brussels International Film Festival	Best Actor	Panaghoy sa Suba	Won
2006	Metro Manila Film Festival	Best Actor	Ligalig	Won
2012	Metro Manila Film Festival	Best Supporting Actor	El Presidente	Won
