= Manila's Finest (2015 film) =

2015 Filipino action film

- Theatrical release poster
- Directed by: William G. Mayo
- Written by: Jose Carreon
- Produced by: Prince Armodoval
- Starring: Jeric Raval; Bangs Garcia; Mark Anthony Fernandez
- Cinematography: Edward G. Mayo
- Edited by: Edward G. Mayo
- Music by: Edward G. Mayo
- Production companies: Prince Armor Productions; Philippine Motion Pictures Directors Association; Viva Films
- Distributed by: Viva Films
- Release dates: November 26, 2015 (Ipil, Zamboanga Sibugay); December 9, 2015
- Country: Philippines
- Language: Filipino

Manila's Finest is a 2015 Filipino action film directed by William G. Mayo and written by Jose Carreon. Inspired by the life of Manila Police Col. Jimmy Tiu, it stars Jeric Raval, Mark Anthony Fernandez, Bangs Garcia, Danilo "Brownie" Pansalin, Jay Prince Armodoval (also producer), Joko Diaz, Leo Martinez, Jao Mapa, Rich Asuncion and Rommel Padilla. Other than a special appearance in Gangster Lolo (2014), this was Raval's first starring role in 13 years, last starring in Mayo's 2002 film Lapu-Lapu. Produced by Prince Armor Productions, the film was released by Viva Films on December 9, 2015.

== Cast ==
- Jeric Raval as Col. Jimmy Tiu
- Mark Anthony Fernandez as Ismael Lorenzo
- Bangs Garcia as Miriam de Dios
- Danilo "Brownie" Pansalin as Gorez dela Cruz
- Jay Prince Armodoval as Jay Capapaz
- Joko Diaz as Brando
- Leo Martinez as Gen. Dela Paz
- Jao Mapa as Rico
- Rich Asuncion as Mylene de Dios
- Rommel Padilla as Col. Lazaro
- Dianne Medina as Jenny Tiu
- Jethro Ramirez as Bryan
- Alvin Anson as Akhmed Omar
- Boy Alano as lookout
- Janice Jurado as Aling Josie
- Amay Bisaya as snatcher
- Leon Miguel as rebel leader
- Rylan Flores as Jake
- Ghen Gabriel as Mrs. Dela Cruz
- Gypsy Briones as Sarah
- Regine Mendieta as wife of Nigerian
- Jim Gaines Jr. as Nigerian
- Sam Buensuceso as police asset
- JC Clint Nicolas as son of Nigerian
- Robert Rivera as rebel leader
- Levi Ignacio as Sgt. Villegaz

== Production ==
Manila's Finest was shot in the City of Manila and in San Jose del Monte, Bulacan. Other than a special appearance in Gangster Lolo (2014), Manila's Finest marks actor Jeric Raval's first starring role in 13 years, last starring in the 2002 film Lapu-Lapu.

== Release ==
Manila's Finest was released in theaters on December 9, 2015; Viva had previously aimed for a June 2015 release date. A press conference for the film was held on August 1, 2015, at the Mowelfund Plaza in Quezon City.

=== Home media ===
On September 1, 2021, Cine Mo! made the film available for streaming without charge on YouTube, while also being available on Vivamax.

=== Critical response ===
ClickTheCity writer Philbert Dy gave the film one out of five stars, stating that it was "hilariously bad".
