= Jao Mapa =

Filipino actor

- Born: Jose Vicente D. Mapa III; February 17, 1976 (age 50); Philippines
- Occupations: Actor, model and painter
- Years active: 1992–present
- Children: 3

Jose Vicente D. Mapa III, who is better known by his screen name Jao Mapa (born February 17, 1976), is a Filipino actor. He is also an accomplished painter.

== Acting career ==
Mapa is best known for his Pepsi-Cola advertisement. He started a modeling career in the late 1990s, and co-hosted television variety shows like Eat Bulaga! and ASAP. He first starred in the movie Pare Ko in 1995, and left show business in 2000 to study art. He expected to be back on television screen via Sine Novela: Trudis Liit aired on GMA Network.

== Painting career ==
In 2000, he took a break from his showbiz career and went back to school to earn his degree in Fine Arts (major in Advertising) at the University of Santo Tomas. He graduated in 2003 and continued to paint. He had his first major show at Grey Gallery in Antipolo, Rizal in 2012.

== Portrayals in media ==
Mapa's life story was feature in TV5's Star Confessions, was portrayed by Martin Escudero.

== Personal life ==
He graduated at the University of Santo Tomas with a degree in Fine Arts, majoring in advertising. His younger brother, Diego Mapa, is also a known musician and plays for the bands Monsterbot, Pedicab and Cambio. He is married to Cecille and has three children, namely, Benjamin, Caleb and Amber Marie.

== Paintings ==
- Pamilya
- Basurero
- Inuman
- Jusinera
- Minotour
- Umaga
- Labandera
- Pista

== Filmography ==
=== Film ===
Year	Title	Role
1994	Maalaala Mo Kaya: The Movie	Jerry
1994	Nag-iisang Bituin	Danny
1995	Pare Ko	Chipper
1995	Hataw Na!	Nico Torres
1995	Asero	Troy
1997	Dahil Tanging Ikaw	Edong
1997	Matrikula	Eddie Boy
1997	Babae	Victor
1999	A Date with Jao Mapa	Jao Mapa
2000	Tugatog	Jake
2000	Tunay Na Mahal	Alex
2005	Cut	
2005	Illusyon	Artist
2006	You Are the One	Venjamin Garcia
2006	Super Noypi	Henry
2007	Xerox Copy	
2008	Ay Ayeng	
2008	Motorcycle	Romus
2008	Sisa	Crisostomo Ibarra
2008	Condo	Ricky
2008	Dollhouse	Red
2008	Huling Pasada	
2008	Baler	Mauro
2008	Miss Taken	Bryan
2009	Medalya	Efren
2009	Pasang Krus	Guiller
2009	I Love Dreamguyz	Didi
2009	Fidel	Goonie
2009	Bala Bala: Maniwala Ka	
2009	69 1/2	Wiley Kamote
2009	Luna Lucis	Joaquin
2010	Donor	Bosco
2010	Working Girls	Leon Arnaldo
2010	HIV: Si Heidi, si Ivy at si V	
2010	Hungkag	Caloy
2010	Pilantik	
2011	Tumbok	Benjie
2012	Balang Araw	
2012	Limang Dipang Tao	Chester
2012	Larong Bata	
2013	Guerilla Is a Poet	
2013	Jumbo Jericho	
2013	Isang Araw	
2014	Sa Ngalan ng Ama, Ina at mga Anak	Ongkoy's assassin 1
2014	Kamandag ni Venus	
2015	Manila's Finest	Rico
2016	Vampires' Transformation: #UsapangVampire Na 'Yan!	Waiter at resort
2016	Bumulakabataan... Bulalakaw Waves	Waiter at Bar
2016	Fruits N' Vegetables: Mga Bulakboleros	University Security Guard
2017	Pagpag: Larawang Kupas	
2021	Paraluman	Peter

=== Television ===
Year	Title	Role
1993	Ang TV	Guest (second season)
1993–1998	Palibhasa Lalake	Jao
1993–2001	Star Drama Presents	
1995	Love Notes	
1995	Gwapings Live!	Host
1995	Eat Bulaga!	
1995	GMA Telecine Specials	
1995	Music Bureau	
1995	Mikee	
1995	Sine Siyete	
1995–1999	ASAP Natin 'To	Host
1997	Campus Romance	
1997	Growing Up	
1999	Star Drama Theatre	
1999	Dear Mikee	
1999	Maynila	
2000	Di Ba't Ikaw	Victor "Junie" Montecillo Jr.
2000	Super Klenk	
2000	GMA Telecine Specials	
2003	Maalaala Mo Kaya	
2003	Hawak Ko ang Langit	
2005	Extra Challenge	
2005	Kakabaka-Boo	
2005	Wag Kukurap	
2005	Maynila	
2005	Magpakailanman	
2006	Baywalk	
2008	Warriors: Celebrity Boxing Challenge	
2009	Komiks	
2009	Daisy Siete: Kambalilong	
2010	Sine Novela: Trudis Liit	Catalino "Lino" Capili
2010	Goin' Bulilit	
2010	Precious Hearts Romances Presents: Alyna	Reynaldo "Naldo" Natividad
2011	Untold Stories Mula sa Face to Face	
2011	Bagets: Just Got Lucky	Jules and Ace's father
2012	Angelito: Ang Bagong Yugto	Ramon Flores
2013	Star Confessions	Samuel
2013	Maalaala Mo Kaya: Family Picture	
2014	It's Showtime	
2014	Magpakailanman	
2015	Sabado Badoo	
2015	Boys Ride Out	
2015	FPJ's Ang Probinsyano	
2016	Wish Ko Lang: Silang Mga Naulila	
2016	Wansapanataym: ParangNorman Activity	
2016	Naku, Boss Ko!	
2017	Dear Uge	
2018	Inday Will Always Love You	
2019	Tadhana	
2020	I Can See You	
2022	The Broken Marriage Vow	
2023	Pira-Pirasong Paraiso	young Daniel Paraiso

=== Television ===
Year	Title
2012	Pacer 3

== See also ==
- Tau Gamma Phi, for their Notable Alumni.
